= Sarah Fisher Hartman Racing =

IndyCar racing team

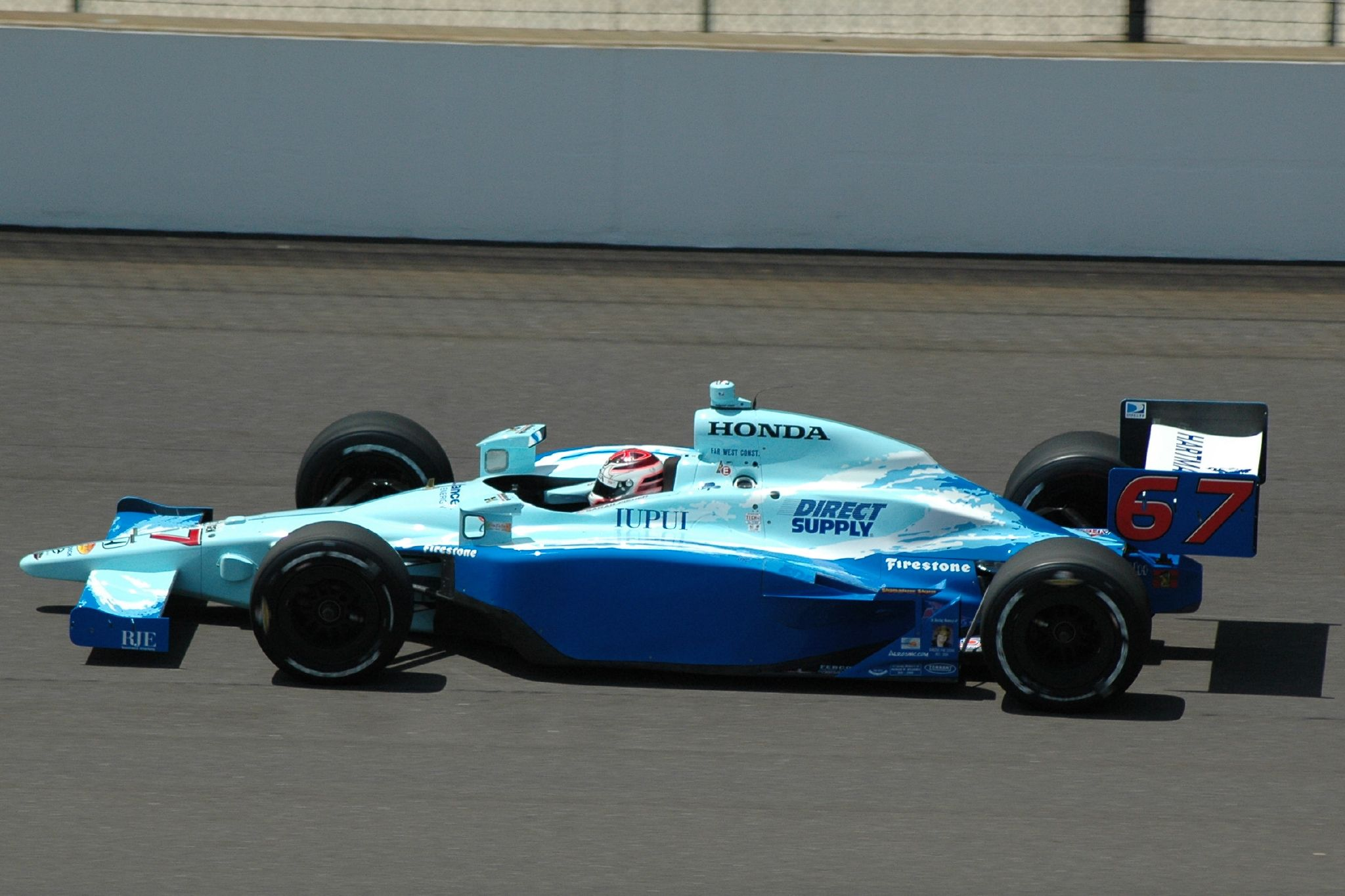
- Owner(s): Sarah Fisher; Andy O'Gara; Wink Hartman
- Base: Indianapolis, Indiana
- Series: USF2000 Championship

Career
- Debut: 2008 Indianapolis 500
- Latest race: 2014 MAVTV 500 IndyCar World Championships
- Race victories: 1

Sarah Fisher Hartman Racing, currently competing as the Sarah Fisher Hartman Racing Development, is an auto racing team founded in January 2008 which competed in the Verizon IndyCar Series. The team is jointly owned by former driver Sarah Fisher, Fisher's husband Andrew O'Gara, and businessman Willis "Wink" E. Hartman. The team competed in the IndyCar Series until 2014, after which it merged with Ed Carpenter Racing to form CFH Racing for the 2015 season. The team ceased operations after the 2015 season, but returned as a development series team in 2020 as Sarah Fisher Hartman Racing Development.

== History ==
=== 2008 season ===
SFR was founded in late 1999 as a platform to handle Sarah Fisher's endorsements and business ventures. Fisher announced on February 27, 2008, that she would begin fielding her own race team in the IndyCar Series in 2008. Fisher, along with her husband Andy O'Gara, his father, John O'Gara and Fisher's then-agent/manager Klint Briney all left Dreyer & Reinbold Racing to start SFR.

The team announced a partial schedule for the 2008 IndyCar Series season that will include the Indianapolis 500. The team's primary sponsor for the Indianapolis 500 was set to be Gravity Entertainment who claimed to represent and have rights to RESQ energy drink, set for a new product launch in May, but when May arrived Gravity Entertainment (who in fact, did not have the rights to represent RESQ as it turned out) failed to deliver any money and put the team's plans of competing at the Indy 500 along with Kentucky and Chicago in jeopardy.

The Indianapolis Motor Speedway opened for practice on Tuesday, May 6, 2008, for the 2008 Indy 500 and Fisher's team continued to move forward without primary sponsorship. The team became front and center when then-presidential hopeful Senator Hillary Clinton paid the team a visit on Indiana's primary election day creating a media frenzy.

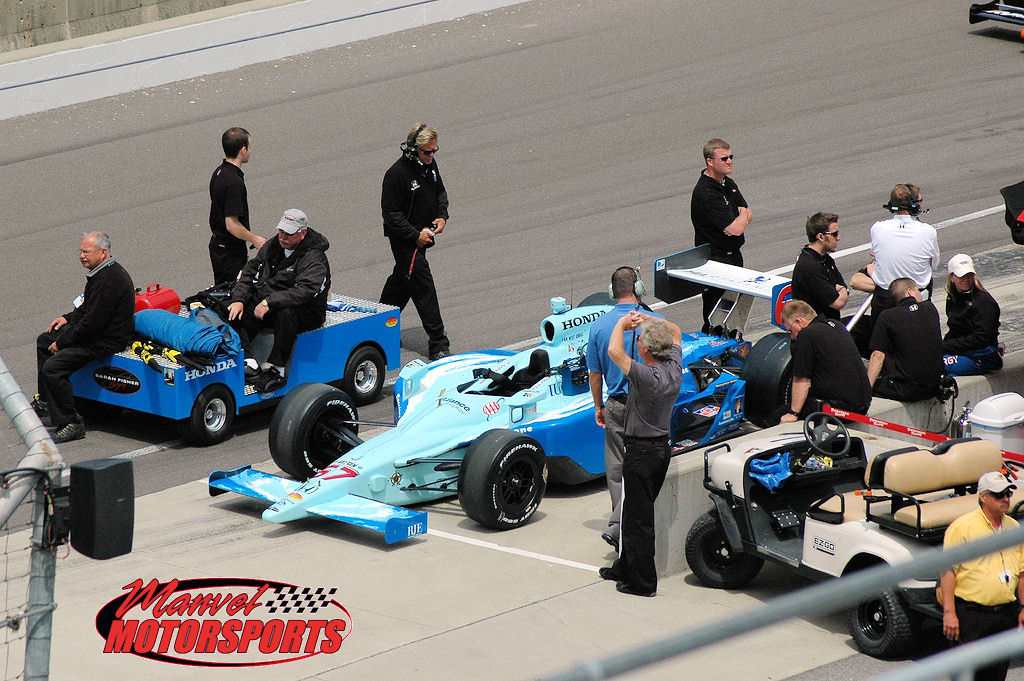
The SFR team during practice for the 2008 Indy 500

As the month went on, SFR continued to pick up associate sponsors, which included Hartman Oil, ProLiance Energy, AAA, Direct Supply, Indianapolis college, IUPUI, as well donations from fans at $51,000. Fisher solidly placed the car in the field in 22nd position and picked up Text4Cars.com as the primary sponsor on the Friday before the Indy 500-mile (800 km) race. The race started on a bad note for the team when the car stalled at the green flag but the team was able to get it going again. Fisher spun on the first caution but made no contact on Lap 12 in Turn 4. She was not as lucky on Lap 106 when a crash by Tony Kanaan collected her car landing her in a 30th place, after running as high as third in the race. After the race, Fisher told ESPN's Jamie Little she was unsure if the team would be able to make it to Kentucky and Chicago because of the crash.

The team announced on July 16, 2008, that Dollar General has become the primary sponsor for the Kentucky Speedway and Chicagoland Speedway races. Fisher tested at Kentucky Speedway on July 31 and August 1 in preparation for the upcoming Meijer Indy 300. Fisher qualified 16th for the race, ran as high as 10th, before a right rear suspension failure on the final lap hampered her finish. The failed part sent Fisher coasting to the finish line to finish 15th. Fisher crashed out of the Chicagoland Speedway race on lap 116 and was credited with 24th.

=== 2009 season ===
The team returned in 2009 with Sarah Fisher as driver for six (6) races and Dollar General as a sponsor. It was announced on January 13, 2009, in USA Today that the team would run four events and later added two additional races April 26, 2009. The team qualified 21st for the 2009 Indianapolis 500 and finished 17th. The team was showcased on three national programs during May, which included The Daily Show with Jon Stewart, CBS's The Price Is Right and FUSE TV's No. 1 Countdown.

It was announced at the end of 2009 that the team would be expanded to two cars for the 2010 season. Fisher would drive the #67 in seven races with Dollar General (all the ovals with the exception of Japan), and newly hired Jay Howard would drive the #66 Service Central machine in Kansas, Indy, Texas, Mid-Ohio, and Chicagoland. SFR put Howard quickly to work to build his brand name joining forces with MTV for a national promotion where Howard served as a driver coach for a music-obsessed teen named Lauren for four weeks during MTV's primetime show Real World/Road Rules Challenge beginning October 28 and ending November 18 with the fifth installment airing during the mtvU Woodie Awards in 2009.

=== 2010 season ===
The 2010 season began with Fisher's longtime agent/manager Klint Briney resigning his position with her team, leaving to start the talent agency, BRANDed. Fisher was slated to open the season at St. Pete but Graham Rahal replaced Fisher for two road course events in 2010 (St. Pete and Barber Motorsports Park) and the team later added Long Beach to Rahal's schedule. The team continued to struggle in 2010 with just one top-10 finish (ninth at St. Pete with Rahal) and the balance of the team's results were 15th place or worse. The team pulled Howard's 2010 Indy 500 qualifying time on Bump Day on a gamble to duplicate his already qualified time, leaving the No. 66 Service Central machine without a spot in the 94th running of the Indianapolis 500.

At ChicagoLand Speedway, Fisher led her first laps since 2002 under a pit strategy, but later went two-laps down to finish 15th, while her teammate Howard's car continued to have issues and which would fulfill Howard's contract with the team. In an effort to salvage the team's relationship with Howard's sponsor, SFR agreed to fulfill Service Central's five-race (Howard drove in just four events after the team pulled his qualifying time for the Indy 500) agreement and added the Kentucky Indy 300 race to the No. 66 car schedule but chose to have Rahal drive the car. The change didn't seem to pay off as Rahal qualified just 25th of 27th cars for the twilight race, finishing 20th (5 laps down) and the last car running and urged media outlets including SpeedTV and the Indianapolis Star to note the No. 66 car has been slow regardless of the driver.

=== 2011 season ===
Fisher announced her retirement on Monday, November 29, 2010, after 25 years of racing while also announcing that Ed Carpenter would be the team's new driver beginning in 2011. The team would celebrate its first win at the 2011 Kentucky Indy 300 on October 2, 2011, Carpenter beating defending series champion Dario Franchitti to the line by .0098 seconds. At the end of the season, Dollar General ended their sponsorship of SFR, and Ed Carpenter left to start his own racing team.

=== 2013 season ===
Century 21 Real Estate announced at their annual convention that they would be the team's official IndyCar sponsor for the Indianapolis 500. The car's number was changed to #21 for the race. Lucas Luhr partnered Newgarden at Sonoma.

=== 2015 season ===
For the 2015 season, the team merged with Ed Carpenter Racing, becoming CFH Racing.

=== Post-Indycar ===
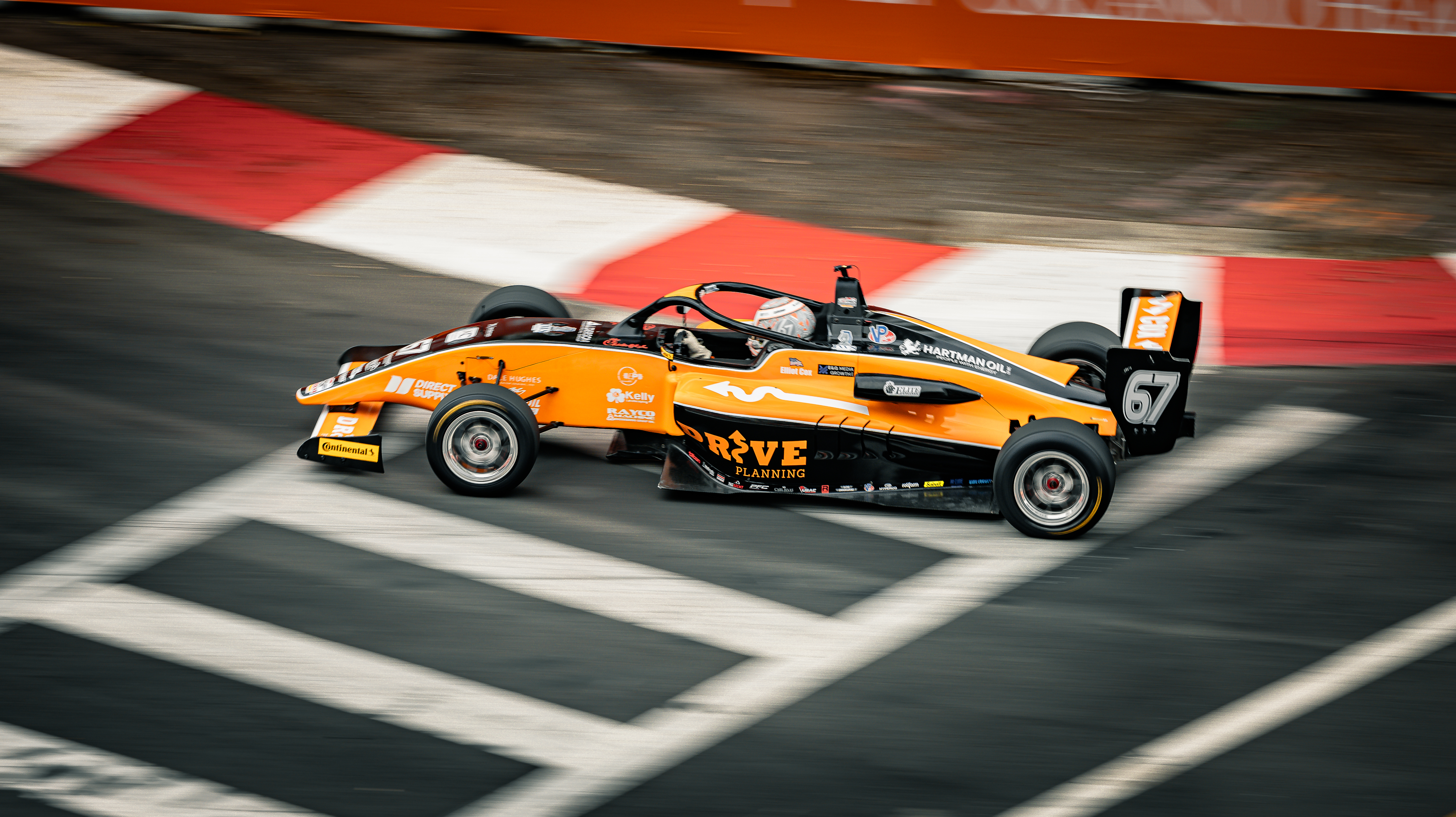
Elliot Cox driving for Sarah Fisher Hartman Racing Development in 2024

After the end of their IndyCar program, Sarah Fisher Hartman Racing continued to run sprint cars in various series in the United States. In 2020, the team announced plans to return to single-seater racing by entering the Formula 4 United States Championship with the team rebranded as Sarah Fisher Hartman Racing Development, but these plans were sidelined with by the global COVID-19 pandemic. In 2022, the team joined the USF Juniors championship as their formal return to single seater racing. In 2023, they competed in the USF2000 Championship.

== Racing results ==
=== Complete IndyCar Series results ===
(key) (Results in bold indicate pole position; results in italics indicate fastest lap)

Year	Chassis	Engine	Driver	no.	1	2	3	4	5	6	7	8	9	10	11	12	13	14	15	16	17	18	19
2008					HMS	STP	MOT	LBH	KAN	INDY	MIL	TXS	IOW	RIR	WGL	NSH	MDO	EDM	KTY	SNM	DET	CHI	SRF^{1}
2008	Dallara IR-05	Honda HI7R V8	(United States) Sarah Fisher	67						30									15			24	
2009					STP	LBH	KAN	INDY	MIL	TXS	IOW	RIR	WGL	TOR	EDM	KTY	MDO	SNM	CHI	MOT	HMS		
2009	Dallara IR-05	Honda HI7R V8	(United States) Sarah Fisher	67			13	17		17						12			14		18		
2010					SAO	STP	ALA	LBH	KAN	INDY	TXS	IOW	WGL	TOR	EDM	MDO	SNM	CHI	KTY	MOT	HMS		
2010	Dallara IR-05	Honda HI7R V8	(United Kingdom) Jay Howard	66					25	DNQ	26					24		22					
2010	Dallara IR-05	Honda HI7R V8	(United States) Graham Rahal	66															20				
2010	Dallara IR-05	Honda HI7R V8	(United States) Graham Rahal	67		9	17	22															
2010	Dallara IR-05	Honda HI7R V8	(United States) Sarah Fisher	67					17	26	15	22						15	22		22		
2011					STP	ALA	LBH	SAO	INDY	TXS		MIL	IOW	TOR	EDM	MDO	NHA	SNM	BAL	MOT	KTY	LSV	
2011	Dallara IR-05	Honda HI7R V8	(South Africa) Tomas Scheckter	57																		C^{2}	
2011	Dallara IR-05	Honda HI7R V8	(United States) Ed Carpenter	67					11	18	16	16	11			22	11	25	20		1	C^{2}	
2012					STP	ALA	LBH	SAO	INDY	DET	TXS	MIL	IOW	TOR	EDM	MDO	SNM	BAL	FON				
2012	Dallara DW12	Honda HI12TT V6t	(United States) Bryan Clauson	39					30														
2012	Dallara DW12	Honda HI12TT V6t	(United States) Josef Newgarden	67	11	17	26	23	25	15	13	25	19	13	17	12	23		16				
2012	Dallara DW12	Honda HI12TT V6t	(Brazil) Bruno Junqueira	67														19					
2013					STP	ALA	LBH	SAO	INDY	DET		TXS	MIL	IOW	POC	TOR		MDO	SNM	BAL	HOU		FON
2013	Dallara DW12	Honda HI13TT V6t	(United States) Josef Newgarden	21					28														
2013	Dallara DW12	Honda HI13TT V6t	(United States) Josef Newgarden	67	23	9	13	5		7	16	8	11	15	5	23	11	23	24	2	5	13	20
2013	Dallara DW12	Honda HI13TT V6t	(Germany) Lucas Luhr	97															22				
2014					STP	LBH	ALA	IMS	INDY	DET		TXS	HOU		POC	IOW	TOR		MDO	MIL	SNM	FON	
2014	Dallara DW12	Honda HI14TT V6t	(United States) Josef Newgarden	67	9	19	8	17	30	20	17	11	20	20	8	2	20	13	12	5	6	10	
2014	Dallara DW12	Honda HI14TT V6t	(Canada) Alex Tagliani	68					13														

1. Non-points-paying exhibition race.
2. The Las Vegas Indy 300 was abandoned after Dan Wheldon died from injuries sustained in a 15-car crash on lap 11.

== IndyCar win ==
#	Season	Date	Track / Race	No.	Winning driver	Chassis	Engine	Tire	Grid	Laps Led
1	2011	October 2	Kentucky Speedway (O)	67	(United States) Ed Carpenter	Dallara IR-05	Honda HI7R V8	Firestone	4	8

- Note: this does not include two wins achieved in 2015 as CFH Racing
