= 2011 Indy Grand Prix of Sonoma =

(United States) 2011 Indy Grand Prix of Sonoma
Race details
- 14th round of the 2011 IndyCar Series season
- Date: August 28, 2011
- Official name: Indy Grand Prix of Sonoma
- Location: Infineon Raceway
- Course: Permanent racing facility 2.303 mi / 3.706 km
- Distance: 75 laps 172.725 mi / 277.950 km
- Weather: 75 °F (24 °C), clear skies

Pole position
- Driver: (Australia) Will Power (Team Penske)
- Time: 01:18.6017

Fastest lap
- Driver: (Australia) Will Power (Team Penske)
- Time: 01:20.8194 (on lap 2 of 75)

Podium
- First: (Australia) Will Power (Team Penske)
- Second: (Brazil) Hélio Castroneves (Team Penske)
- Third: (Australia) Ryan Briscoe (Team Penske)

The 2011 Indy Grand Prix of Sonoma was the seventh running of the Indy Grand Prix of Sonoma and the fourteenth round of the 2011 IndyCar Series season. It took place on Sunday, August 28, 2011. The race contested over 75 laps at the 2.303-mile (3.706 km) Infineon Raceway in Sonoma, California. Will Power led 71 of 75 laps, as Team Penske swept 1st–2nd–3rd on the podium. It was the first 1–2–3 finish in an Indycar race for Penske since Nazareth in 1994. Power closed to within 26 points of championship leader Dario Franchitti. Power also closed within 7 points of Franchitti for the Mario Andretti Road Course Trophy. Simon Pagenaud substituted for Simona de Silvestro after she had complications renewing her visa, and U.S. Customs would not allow her into the country.

== Classification ==
=== Race ===
Pos	No.	Driver	Team	Laps	Time/Retired	Grid	Laps Led	Points
1	12	(Australia) Will Power	Team Penske	75	1:47:29.7619	1	71	53
2	3	(Brazil) Hélio Castroneves	Team Penske	75	+3.2420	2	0	40
3	6	(Australia) Ryan Briscoe	Team Penske	75	+6.4494	3	4	35
4	10	(United Kingdom) Dario Franchitti	Chip Ganassi Racing	75	+7.6540	4	0	32
5	9	(New Zealand) Scott Dixon	Chip Ganassi Racing	75	+14.4755	5	0	30
6	19	(France) Sébastien Bourdais	Dale Coyne Racing	75	+17.1257	8	0	28
7	06	(Canada) James Hinchcliffe (R)	Newman/Haas Racing	75	+17.2713	6	0	26
8	38	(United States) Graham Rahal	Chip Ganassi Racing	75	+17.7900	13	0	24
9	59	(Venezuela) E. J. Viso	KV Racing Technology – Lotus	75	+21.6276	9	0	22
10	28	(United States) Ryan Hunter–Reay	Andretti Autosport	75	+22.1731	19	0	20
11	2	(Spain) Oriol Servià	Newman/Haas Racing	75	+22.9512	18	0	19
12	17	(United Kingdom) Martin Plowman (R)	Sam Schmidt Motorsports	75	+24.2602	15	0	18
13	24	(Brazil) Ana Beatriz (R)	Dreyer & Reinbold Racing	75	+29.7207	10	0	17
14	34	(Colombia) Sebastián Saavedra (R)	Conquest Racing	75	+41.1146	23	0	16
15	78	(France) Simon Pagenaud (R)	HVM Racing	75	+41.7526	22	0	15
16	27	(United Kingdom) Mike Conway	Andretti Autosport	75	+1:14.2912	7	0	14
17	22	(Italy) Giorgio Pantano (R)	Dreyer & Reinbold Racing	75	+1:14.2922	11	0	13
18	5	(Japan) Takuma Sato	KV Racing Technology – Lotus	74	+ 1 Laps	16	0	12
19	18	(United Kingdom) James Jakes (R)	Dale Coyne Racing	74	+ 1 Laps	17	0	12
20	77	(Canada) Alex Tagliani	Sam Schmidt Motorsports	74	+ 1 Laps	12	0	12
21	7	(United States) Danica Patrick	Andretti Autosport	74	+ 1 Laps	25	0	12
22	14	(Brazil) Vítor Meira	A. J. Foyt Enterprises	74	+ 1 Laps	28	0	12
23	4	(United States) J. R. Hildebrand (R)	Panther Racing	74	+ 1 Laps	20	0	12
24	26	(United States) Marco Andretti	Andretti Autosport	74	+ 1 Laps	14	0	12
25	67	(United States) Ed Carpenter	Sarah Fisher Racing	74	+ 1 Laps	27	0	10
26	83	(United States) Charlie Kimball (R)	Chip Ganassi Racing	66	+ 9 Laps	26	0	10
27	88	(China) Ho-Pin Tung (R)	Dragon Racing	63	Contact	24	0	10
28	82	(Brazil) Tony Kanaan	KV Racing Technology – Lotus	38	Mechanical	21	0	10
OFFICIAL RACE REPORT

^{1} Penalty for blocking, moved to end of lead lap

== Championship standings after the race ==
Drivers' Championship standings

Pos	Driver	Points
1	(United Kingdom) Dario Franchitti	475
2	(Australia) Will Power	449
3	(New Zealand) Scott Dixon	400
4	(Spain) Oriol Servià	327
5	(Australia) Ryan Briscoe	312

- Note: Only the top five positions are included.

Previous race: 2011 MoveThatBlock.com Indy 225	IZOD IndyCar Series; 2011 season	Next race: 2011 Baltimore Grand Prix (IndyCar)
Previous race: 2010 Indy Grand Prix of Sonoma	2011 Indy Grand Prix of Sonoma	Next race: 2012 GoPro Indy Grand Prix of Sonoma
