= 2011 Kentucky Indy 300 =

(United States) 2011 Kentucky
Race details
- 17th round of the 2011 IndyCar Series season
- Date: October 2, 2011
- Official name: Kentucky Indy 300
- Location: Kentucky Speedway, Sparta, Kentucky
- Course: Permanent racing facility 1.480 mi / 2.382 km
- Distance: 200 laps 296 mi / 476.366 km
- Weather: 76 °F (24 °C), overcast

Pole position
- Driver: (Australia) Will Power (Verizon Team Penske)
- Time: 24.2910

Fastest lap
- Driver: (United States) Ed Carpenter (Dollar General/Sarah Fisher Racing)
- Time: 24.3847 (on lap 73 of 200)

Podium
- First: (United States) Ed Carpenter (Dollar General/Sarah Fisher Racing)
- Second: (Scotland) Dario Franchitti (Downy/Chip Ganassi)
- Third: (New Zealand) Scott Dixon (Target Chip Ganassi Racing)

The 2011 Kentucky Indy 300 was the twelfth running of the Kentucky Indy 300 and the seventeenth round of the 2011 IndyCar Series season. It took place on Sunday, October 2, 2011. The race contested over 200 laps at the 1.480-mile (2.382 km) Kentucky Speedway in Sparta, Kentucky.

This would ultimately be the last classified race of Dan Wheldon's career. In the following race, Wheldon would be involved in a 15-car accident at Las Vegas Motor Speedway, which would claim his life. The race was abandoned, and therefore was not classified as an official race. Buddy Rice and Vítor Meira were also in this and the next race, after which they made no more IndyCar starts, making this the final classified race of their careers as well. This was also the final classified race for Newman/Haas Racing.

== Grid ==
Dan Wheldon, whose only race to date in the 2011 IndyCar series had been his win at the Indianapolis 500, replaced Alex Tagliani in the Sam Schmidt Motorsports #77 car.

Row	Inside		Outside	
1	12	(Australia) Will Power	38	(United States) Graham Rahal
2	06	(Canada) James Hinchcliffe (R)	67	(United States) Ed Carpenter
3	4	(United States) J. R. Hildebrand (R)	26	(United States) Marco Andretti
4	9	(New Zealand) Scott Dixon	28	(United States) Ryan Hunter-Reay
5	2	(Spain) Oriol Servià	83	(United States) Charlie Kimball (R)
6	10	(Scotland) Dario Franchitti	27	(United Kingdom) Mike Conway
7	78	(Switzerland) Simona de Silvestro	7	(United States) Danica Patrick
8	17	(New Zealand) Wade Cunningham (R)	3	(Brazil) Hélio Castroneves
9	44	(United States) Buddy Rice	6	(Australia) Ryan Briscoe
10	82	(Brazil) Tony Kanaan	24	(Brazil) Ana Beatriz (R)
11	14	(Brazil) Vítor Meira	5	(Japan) Takuma Sato
12	59	(Venezuela) E. J. Viso	19	(England) Alex Lloyd
13	34	(United Kingdom) Dillon Battistini (R)	22	(United States) Townsend Bell
14	18	(United Kingdom) James Jakes (R)	77	(United Kingdom) Dan Wheldon †
15	30	(United Kingdom) Pippa Mann		

† Did not qualify.

== Results ==
Pos	Name	Laps	Start (Moves)
**1**	**Ed Carpenter 67**	**200**	**4 (+3)**
**2**	**Dario Franchitti 10**	**200**	**11 (+9)**
**3**	**Scott Dixon 9**	**200**	**7 (+4)**
4	(R) James Hinchcliffe 06	200	3 (-1)
5	Ryan Hunter-Reay 28	200	8 (+3)
6	Oriol Servia 2	200	9 (-3)
7	(R) Wade Cunningham 17	200	15 (+8)
8	Ryan Briscoe 6	200	18 (+10)
9	Buddy Rice 44	200	17 (+8)
10	Danica Patrick 7	200	14 (+4)
11	Townsend Bell 22	200	26 (+15)
12	Graham Rahal 38	200	2 (-10)
13	(R) Charlie Kimball 83	200	10 (-3)
14	Dan Wheldon 77	200	28 (+13)
15	Takuma Sato 5	200	22 (+7)
16	Vítor Meira 14	200	21 (+5)
17	Tony Kanaan 82	200	19 (+2)
18	Mike Conway 27	200	13 (-5)
19	Will Power 12	200	1 (-18)
20	(R) JR Hildebrand 4	199	5 (-15)
21	(R) James Jakes 18	198	27 (+6)
22	Pippa Mann 30	197	29 (+7)
23	EJ Viso 59	192	23 (0)
24	(R) Ana Beatriz 24	Ret	20 (-4)
25	Simona De Silvestro 78	Ret	13 (-18)
26	Alex Lloyd 19	Ret	24 (-2)
27	Marco Andretti 26	Ret	6 (-21)
28	(R) Dillon Battistini 34	Ret	25 (-3)
29	Hélio Castroneves 3	Ret	16 (-13)

Italics indicates the pole sitter

Bold indicates the podium

Previous race: 2011 Indy Japan: The Final	IndyCar Series; 2011 season	Next race: 2011 IZOD IndyCar World Championship
Previous race: 2010 Kentucky Indy 300	Kentucky Indy 300	Next race: N/A
