= 2011 Edmonton Indy =

(Canada) 2011 Edmonton Indy
Race details
- 10th round of the 2011 IndyCar Series season
- Date: July 24, 2011
- Official name: Edmonton Indy
- Location: Edmonton City Centre Airport
- Course: Temporary street circuit 2.224 mi / 3.579 km
- Distance: 80 laps 4183.34 mi / 6730.99 km
- Weather: Temperatures reaching up to 24 °C (75 °F); with wind speeds up to 9.9 kilometres per hour (6.2 mph)

Pole position
- Driver: (Japan) Takuma Sato (KV Racing Technology - Lotus)
- Time: 1:18.5165

Fastest lap
- Driver: (France) Sébastien Bourdais (Dale Coyne Racing)
- Time: 1:18.9590 (on lap 80 of 80)

Podium
- First: (Australia) Will Power (Team Penske)
- Second: (Brazil) Hélio Castroneves (Team Penske)
- Third: (United Kingdom) Dario Franchitti (Chip Ganassi Racing)

The 2011 Edmonton Indy was the fourth running of the Edmonton Indy and the tenth round of the 2011 IndyCar Series season. It took place on Sunday, July 24, 2011. The race contested over 80 laps at the 2.224-mile (3.579 km) Edmonton City Centre Airport in Edmonton, Alberta. The circuit was modified to facilitate overtaking.

== Grid ==
Row	Inside		Outside	
1	5	(Japan) Takuma Sato	12	(Australia) Will Power
2	9	(New Zealand) Scott Dixon	10	(Scotland) Dario Franchitti
3	59	(Venezuela) E. J. Viso	6	(Australia) Ryan Briscoe
4	28	(United States) Ryan Hunter-Reay	2	(Spain) Oriol Servià
5	3	(Brazil) Hélio Castroneves	06	(Canada) James Hinchcliffe (R)
6	82	(Brazil) Tony Kanaan	19	(France) Sébastien Bourdais
7	38	(United States) Graham Rahal	14	(Brazil) Vítor Meira
8	22	(United Kingdom) Justin Wilson	78	(Switzerland) Simona de Silvestro
9	77	(Canada) Alex Tagliani	18	(United Kingdom) James Jakes (R)
10	26	(United States) Marco Andretti	27	(United Kingdom) Mike Conway
11	83	(United States) Charlie Kimball (R)	7	(United States) Danica Patrick
12	24	(Brazil) Ana Beatriz (R)	4	(United States) J. R. Hildebrand (R)
13	8	(Canada) Paul Tracy	34	(Colombia) Sebastián Saavedra (R)

=== Race ===
Pos	No.	Driver	Team	Laps	Time/Retired	Points
1	12	(Australia) Will Power	Team Penske	80	01:57:22.5177	52
2	3	(Brazil) Hélio Castroneves	Team Penske	80	01:57:23.3266	40
3	10	(United Kingdom) Dario Franchitti	Chip Ganassi Racing	80	01:57:23.6912	35
4	82	(Brazil) Tony Kanaan	KV Racing Technology - Lotus	80	01:57:33.6684	32
5	22	(United Kingdom) Justin Wilson	Dreyer & Reinbold Racing	80	01:57:34.3012	30
6	19	(France) Sébastien Bourdais	Dale Coyne Racing	80	01:57:35.1858	28
7	28	(United States) Ryan Hunter-Reay	Andretti Autosport	80	01:57:40.5436	26
8	27	(United Kingdom) Mike Conway	Andretti Autosport	80	01:57:40.8740	24
9	7	(United States) Danica Patrick	Andretti Autosport	80	01:57:53.6755	22
10	6	(Australia) Ryan Briscoe	Team Penske	80	01:57:53.6755	20
11	4	(United States) J. R. Hildebrand (R)	Panther Racing	80	01:57:58.0581	19
12	14	(Brazil) Vítor Meira	A. J. Foyt Racing	80	01:58:00.0749	18
13	24	(Brazil) Ana Beatriz (R)	Dreyer & Reinbold Racing	80	01:58:29.7632	17
14	26	(United States) Marco Andretti	Andretti Autosport	80	01:58:32.7190	16
15	06	(Canada) James Hinchcliffe (R)	Newman/Haas Racing	80	01:58:33.6356	15
16	34	(Colombia) Sebastián Saavedra (R)	Conquest Racing	80	01:58:38.2988	14
17	77	(Canada) Alex Tagliani	Sam Schmidt Motorsports	80	01:58:38.4043	13
18	18	(United Kingdom) James Jakes (R)	Dale Coyne Racing	80	01:58:38.7070	12
19	83	(United States) Charlie Kimball (R)	Chip Ganassi Racing	79	+1 lap	12
20	59	(Venezuela) E. J. Viso	KV Racing Technology - Lotus	79	+1 lap	12
21	5	(Japan) Takuma Sato	KV Racing Technology - Lotus	79	+1 lap	13
22	2	(Spain) Oriol Servià	Newman/Haas Racing	76	+ 4 Laps	12
23	9	(New Zealand) Scott Dixon	Chip Ganassi Racing	74	+ 6 Laps	12
24	78	(Switzerland) Simona de Silvestro	HVM Racing	54	Mechanical	12
25	38	(United States) Graham Rahal	Chip Ganassi Racing	0	Contact	10
26	8	(Canada) Paul Tracy	Dragon Racing	0	Contact	10
OFFICIAL RACE REPORT

== Standings after the race ==
Drivers' Championship standings

Pos	Driver	Points
1	(Scotland) Dario Franchitti	271
2	(Australia) Will Power	-38
3	(New Zealand) Scott Dixon	-106
4	(Brazil) Tony Kanaan	-135
5	(Spain) Oriol Servià	-144

Previous race: 2011 Honda Indy Toronto	IZOD IndyCar Series; 2011 season	Next race: 2011 Honda Indy 200
Previous race: 2010 Honda Indy Edmonton	2011 Edmonton Indy	Next race: 2012 Edmonton Indy
