= 2011 Iowa Corn Indy 250 =

(United States) 2011 Iowa Corn Indy 250
Race details
- 8th round of the 2011 IndyCar Series season
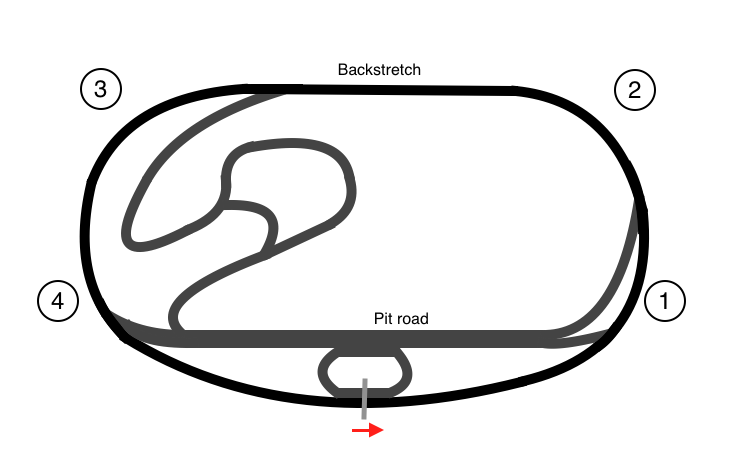
- Date: June 25, 2011
- Official name: Iowa Corn Indy 250
- Location: Iowa Speedway
- Course: Permanent racing facility 0.875 mi / 1.4 km
- Distance: 250 laps 218.75 mi / 352.044 km

Pole position
- Driver: (Japan) (Japan) Takuma Sato (KV Racing Technology - Lotus)
- Time: 35.6857 (2-lap)

Fastest lap
- Driver: (Canada) (Canada) Alex Tagliani (Sam Schmidt Motorsports)
- Time: 18.0958 (on lap 21 of 250)

Podium
- First: (United States) (United States) Marco Andretti (Andretti Autosport)
- Second: (Brazil) (Brazil) Tony Kanaan (KV Racing Technology – Lotus)
- Third: (New Zealand) (New Zealand) Scott Dixon (Chip Ganassi Racing)

The 2011 Iowa Corn Indy 250 Presented by Pioneer was the fifth running of the Iowa Corn Indy 250 and the eighth round of the 2011 IndyCar Series season. It took place on Saturday, June 25, 2011. The race was contested over 250 laps at the 0.875-mile (1.408 km) Iowa Speedway in Newton, Iowa, and was televised by Versus in the United States.

The winner of the 2011 race was Marco Andretti. Takuma Sato held the pole position running a time of 35.6857 seconds, while Alex Tagliani had the fastest lap running lap 21 in 18.0958 seconds. The last year winner Tony Kanaan finished in second, while Scott Dixon came in third place.

Previous race: 2011 Milwaukee 225	IZOD IndyCar Series; 2011 season	Next race: 2011 Honda Indy Toronto
Previous race: 2010 Iowa Corn Indy 250	2011 Iowa Corn Indy 250	Next race: 2012 Iowa Corn Indy 250
