= 2011 Milwaukee 225 =

(United States) 2011 Milwaukee 225
Race details
- 7th round of the 2011 IndyCar Series season
- Date: June 19, 2011
- Official name: Milwaukee 225
- Location: The Milwaukee Mile
- Course: Permanent racing facility 1.000 mi / 1.609 km
- Distance: 225 laps 225 mi / 362.102 km
- Weather: Temperatures reaching up to 75.2 °F (24.0 °C); wind speeds approaching 8.9 miles per hour (14.3 km/h)

Pole position
- Driver: (United Kingdom) Dario Franchitti (Chip Ganassi Racing)
- Time: 42.7766 (2 laps)

Fastest lap
- Driver: (United Kingdom) Dario Franchitti (Chip Ganassi Racing)
- Time: 22.3693 (on lap 10 of 225)

Podium
- First: (United Kingdom) Dario Franchitti (Chip Ganassi Racing)
- Second: (United States) Graham Rahal (Service Central Chip Ganassi)
- Third: (Spain) Oriol Servià (Newman/Haas Racing)

Chronology
Previous	Next
2009	2012

The 2011 Milwaukee 225 was the seventh round of the 2011 IndyCar Series season, held on June 19, 2011 at the 1.015-mile (1.633 km) Milwaukee Mile, in West Allis, Wisconsin.

== Race ==
Pos	No.	Driver	Team	Laps	Time/Retired	Grid	Laps Led	Points
1	10	(United Kingdom) Dario Franchitti	Chip Ganassi Racing	225	1:56:43.5877	1	161	53
2	38	(United States) Graham Rahal	Chip Ganassi Racing	225	1:56:45.0148	12	0	40
3	2	(Spain) Oriol Servià	Newman/Haas Racing	225	1:56:46.3580	10	0	35
4	12	(Australia) Will Power	Team Penske	225	1:56:47.4633	17	0	32
5	7	(United States) Danica Patrick	Andretti Autosport	225	1:56:47.8166	15	0	30
6	06	(Canada) James Hinchcliffe (R)	Newman/Haas Racing	225	1:56:48.7898	16	0	28
7	9	(New Zealand) Scott Dixon	Chip Ganassi Racing	225	1:56:49.3680	3	0	26
8	5	(Japan) Takuma Sato	KV Racing Technology - Lotus	225	1:56:49.6888	5	0	24
9	3	(Brazil) Hélio Castroneves	Team Penske	225	1:56:49.9520	2	31	22
10	22	(United Kingdom) Justin Wilson	Dreyer & Reinbold Racing	225	1:56:50.4782	13	0	20
11	6	(Australia) Ryan Briscoe	Team Penske	225	1:56:51.8352	8	0	19
12	27	(United Kingdom) Mike Conway	Andretti Autosport	225	1:56:52.5346	20	0	18
13	26	(United States) Marco Andretti	Andretti Autosport	225	1:56:53.4536	9	0	17
14	83	(United States) Charlie Kimball (R)	Chip Ganassi Racing	224	+ 1 Lap	21	0	16
15	18	(United Kingdom) James Jakes (R)	Dale Coyne Racing	223	+ 2 Laps	15	0	15
16	67	(United States) Ed Carpenter	Sarah Fisher Racing	223	+ 2 Laps	25	0	14
17	24	(Brazil) Ana Beatriz	Dreyer & Reinbold Racing	222	+ 3 Laps	11	0	13
18	77	(Canada) Alex Tagliani	Sam Schmidt Motorsports	196	+ 29 Laps	19	0	12
19	82	(Brazil) Tony Kanaan	KV Racing Technology - Lotus	194	Contact	4	33	12
20	59	(Venezuela) E. J. Viso	KV Racing Technology - Lotus	163	Contact	6	0	12
21	4	(United States) J. R. Hildebrand (R)	Panther Racing	120	Contact	18	0	12
22	19	(United Kingdom) Alex Lloyd	Dale Coyne Racing	79	Contact	14	0	12
23	34	(Colombia) Sebastián Saavedra (R)	Conquest Racing	78	Contact	24	0	12
24	14	(Brazil) Vítor Meira	A. J. Foyt Enterprises	69	Mechanical	22	0	12
25	78	(Switzerland) Simona de Silvestro	HVM Racing	11	Handling	26	0	10
26	28	(United States) Ryan Hunter-Reay	Andretti Autosport	0	Contact	7	0	10

== Standings after the race ==
Drivers' Championship standings

Pos	Driver	Points
=1	(Australia) Will Power	271
=1	(United Kingdom) Dario Franchitti	271
3	(Spain) Oriol Servià	198
4	(New Zealand) Scott Dixon	195
5	(United States) Graham Rahal	176

Previous race: 2011 Firestone Twin 275s	IZOD IndyCar Series; 2011 season	Next race: 2011 Iowa Corn Indy 250
Previous race: 2009 ABC Supply Company A.J. Foyt 225	IndyCar Series at the Milwaukee Mile	Next race: 2012 Milwaukee IndyFest
