= 2011 IndyCar Series =

American auto racing season

2011 IndyCar season
- IZOD IndyCar Series

Season
- Races: 18
- Start date: March 27
- End date: October 16

Awards
- Drivers' champion: (United Kingdom) Dario Franchitti
- Rookie of the Year: (Canada) James Hinchcliffe
- Indianapolis 500 winner: (United Kingdom) Dan Wheldon

Discipline champions
- Oval champion: (New Zealand) Scott Dixon
- Road course champion: (Australia) Will Power

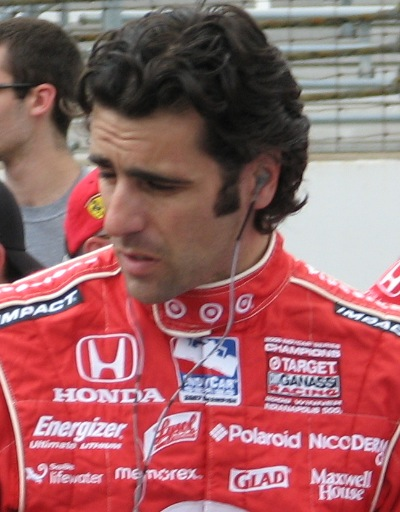
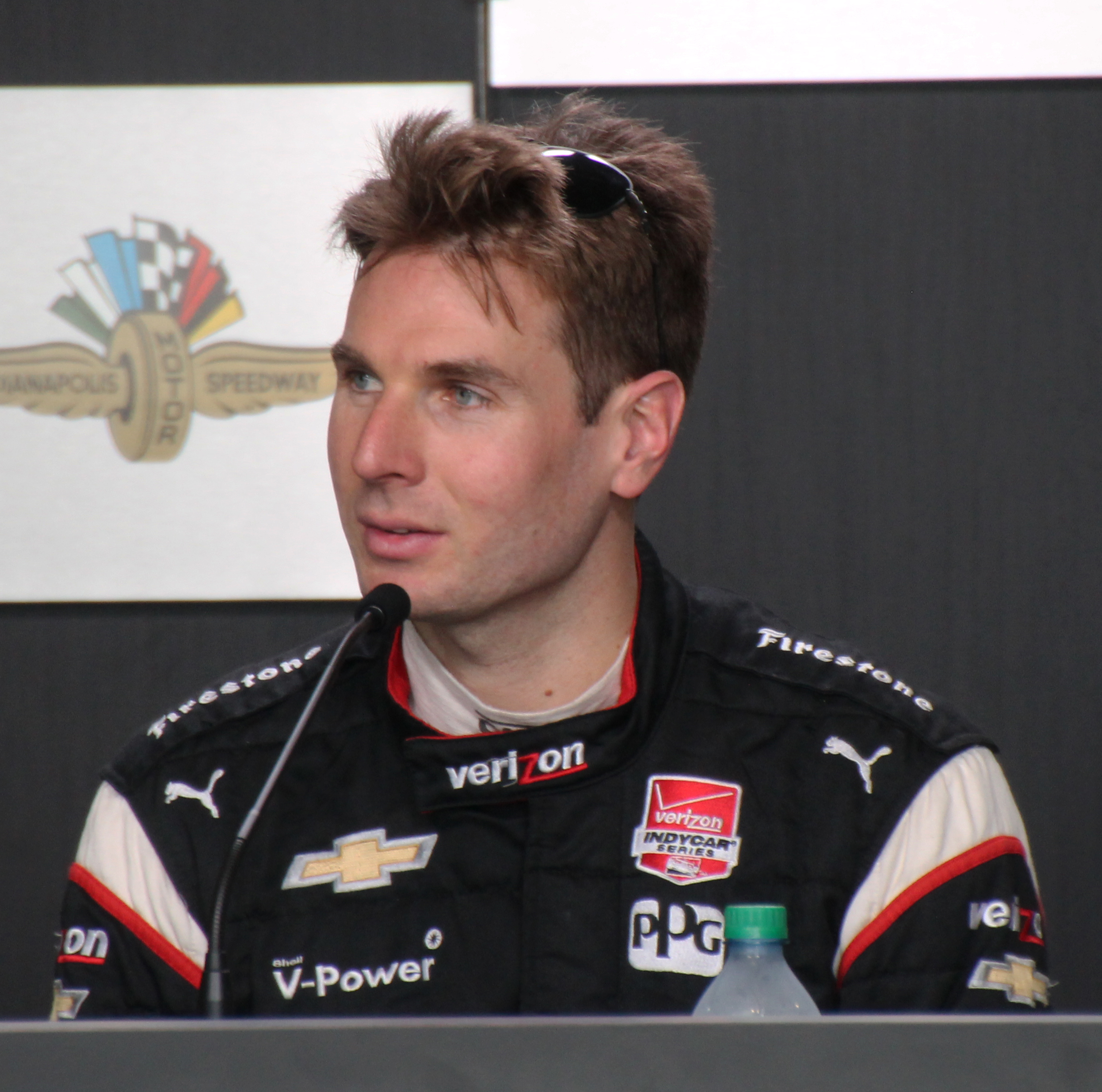
Dario Franchitti (left) won his fourth Drivers' Championship (third straight title) while Will Power (right) finished second in the championship for the second consecutive season.

The 2011 IZOD IndyCar Series was the 16th season of the IndyCar Series and the 100th recognized season of American open-wheel motor racing. The season was sanctioned by IndyCar and was part of the Mazda Road to Indy. The season began in March and concluded in October, consisting of seventeen events.

It was the final season running the Dallara IR-05 spec cars, which had been the series' sole chassis supplier since 2007. It was also the final season running the Honda Indy V8 naturally-aspirated engines, which had been the series' sole engine supplier since 2006. The events took place in twelve states of the United States, as well Canada, Brazil, and Japan. The schedule featured ten street/road courses and eight on oval tracks. The premier event was the 95th Indianapolis 500, won by Dan Wheldon.

Dario Franchitti claimed his fourth IndyCar Series Championship title. He went into the final race of the season leading Will Power by 18 points. However, the race and the season were both marred by a 15-car pile-up early in the race that claimed Wheldon's life. The race was abandoned after 12 completed laps and the final points total reverted to the previous event, with Franchitti winning the title.

Rookie of the Year honors went to Canadian James Hinchcliffe, who led American J. R. Hildebrand in the rookie standings by 6 points going into the final race. Hildebrand's season was highlighted by a nearly winning the Indianapolis 500. His 2nd-place finish at Indy earned him top rookie honors for the race.

This season marked the end of several drivers' IndyCar careers. After 11 seasons, 2011 saw the conclusion of two-time series runner up Davey Hamilton's career. Hamilton would later partner with Sam Schmidt to form Schmidt Hamilton Motorsports, a team that would last for two seasons before changing to Schmidt Peterson Motorsports from 2014 onwards. Vítor Meira was another who made 2011 his final season; in his career, Meira set the record for the most podiums without a win, with 15. Paul Tracy would make an attempt to find a car for 2012, but was unsuccessful in doing so, making 2011 his final season in IndyCar also. Bertrand Baguette would shift his focus to sports cars for 2012, racing in the World Endurance Championship. Raphael Matos would only race until the Indy 500 and for 2012 he would switch to Stock Car Brasil. Danica Patrick would head to NASCAR for 2011 leaving an open seat at Andretti Autosport. Tomas Scheckter made his final starts of his career across several teams in 2011 before moving to the United Kingdom. Buddy Rice would be yet another to make 2011 his final season. Rice collected three wins in his IndyCar career. Wheldon would sign a contract to race for Andretti Autosport for 2012 driving the number 27 car, replacing Danica Patrick, but the 2005 champion was killed in an accident at Las Vegas Motor Speedway.

This would be the final season for Versus broadcasting IndyCar. Versus would be rebranded into NBC Sports for 2012, a name that has continued to this day (2024). ESPN would continue to also broadcast certain races as well.

== Series news ==
- The 95th Indianapolis 500 marked the third race of the three-year-long Centennial era, celebrating the 100th anniversary of the opening of the Indianapolis Motor Speedway and the 100th anniversary of the first Indianapolis 500-mile race.
- On January 11, the series made several announcements with regards to the upcoming season:
  - The governing body adopted the doing business as name of INDYCAR (all capital letters). The legal entity remains Indy Racing League, LLC, and is specifically mentioned in the INDYCAR Rule Book.
  - The "restart zone" on ovals were moved from turn 3 to just before the start/finish line.
  - Restart procedures would mimic those of NASCAR, including double-file restarts, separate pitting for lead lap and non-lead lap cars, and the waving around of lapped cars that did not pit. The "free pass" rule would not be implemented.
  - Pit stall selection for each race would be determined by the qualifying order of the previous round at the track of the same type (e.g., road course or oval). Exceptions to this will be the season opener at St. Petersburg, which would be set by final entrants' points from 2010, and the Indy 500, which carries its own pit selection process.
- On March 6, the series announced that the maximum field size for every IndyCar event this season would be limited to 26 cars, except for the Indianapolis 500 (which remains at the traditional 33) and the Las Vegas finale (34 cars).
- Firestone has signed an extension to remain as the series' sole tire supplier through 2013.

== Confirmed entries ==
- This chart reflects confirmed participants only. All drivers competed in identical Honda HI11R V8-powered, Firestone Firehawk-shod and Dallara IR-05 chassis. R reflects an IZOD IndyCar Series rookie.

Team	No.	Drivers	Rounds
A. J. Foyt Enterprises	14	(Brazil) Vítor Meira	All
A. J. Foyt Enterprises	41	(Brazil) Bruno Junqueira (Note: Junqueira qualified the car, replaced by Hunter-Reay after negotiations with Andretti Autosport.)	5
A. J. Foyt Enterprises	41	(United States) Ryan Hunter-Reay	5
AFS Racing	17	(Brazil) Raphael Matos	1–5
AFS / Sam Schmidt Motorsports	17	(United Kingdom) Martin Plowman R	11, 13–14
AFS / Sam Schmidt Motorsports	17	(Japan) Hideki Mutoh	15
AFS / Sam Schmidt Motorsports	17	(New Zealand) Wade Cunningham R	16–17
Andretti Autosport	7	(United States) Danica Patrick	All
Andretti Autosport	26	(United States) Marco Andretti	All
Andretti Autosport	27	(United Kingdom) Mike Conway	All
Andretti Autosport	28	(United States) Ryan Hunter-Reay	All
Andretti Autosport	43	(United States) John Andretti (Note: In conjunction with Richard Petty Motorsports.)	5
Bryan Herta Autosport	98	(United Kingdom) Dan Wheldon	5
Bryan Herta Autosport	98	(Canada) Alex Tagliani	17
Chip Ganassi Racing	9	(New Zealand) Scott Dixon	All
Chip Ganassi Racing	10	(United Kingdom) Dario Franchitti	All
Chip Ganassi Racing	38	(United States) Graham Rahal	All
Chip Ganassi Racing	83	(United States) Charlie Kimball R	All
Conquest Racing	34	(Colombia) Sebastián Saavedra R	1–14, 17
Conquest Racing	34	(Brazil) João Paulo de Oliveira R	15
Conquest Racing	34	(United Kingdom) Dillon Battistini R	16
Conquest Racing	36	(United Kingdom) Pippa Mann R	5
Dale Coyne Racing	18	(United Kingdom) James Jakes R	All
Dale Coyne Racing	19	(France) Sébastien Bourdais	1–4, 9–11, 13–15
Dale Coyne Racing	19	(United Kingdom) Alex Lloyd	5–8, 12, 16–17
Dragon Racing	8	(Canada) Paul Tracy	3, 6, 9–10, 17
Dragon Racing	8	(China) Ho-Pin Tung R (Note: In conjunction with Sam Schmidt Motorsports.)	5
Dragon Racing	88	(China) Ho-Pin Tung R	13
Dragon Racing	20	(United States) Scott Speed R	5
Dragon Racing	20	(Canada) Patrick Carpentier (Note: Carpentier attempted to qualify the #20 at the Indy 500 after Speed couldn't get the car up to speed in time for Pole Day.)	5
Dreyer & Reinbold Racing	11	(United States) Davey Hamilton	5–6, 17
Dreyer & Reinbold Racing	22	(United Kingdom) Justin Wilson (Note: Injured during practice at Mid-Ohio)	1–11
Dreyer & Reinbold Racing	22	(France) Simon Pagenaud R	11
Dreyer & Reinbold Racing	22	(South Africa) Tomas Scheckter	12
Dreyer & Reinbold Racing	22	(Italy) Giorgio Pantano R	13–15
Dreyer & Reinbold Racing	22	(United States) Townsend Bell	16–17
Dreyer & Reinbold Racing	23	(Canada) Paul Tracy	5
Dreyer & Reinbold Racing	24	(Brazil) Ana Beatriz R	1, 3–17
Dreyer & Reinbold Racing	24	(France) Simon Pagenaud R	2
HVM Racing	78	(Switzerland) Simona de Silvestro	1–7, 9–12, 14–17
HVM Racing	78	(France) Simon Pagenaud R	13
KV Racing Technology—Lotus	5	(Japan) Takuma Sato	All
KV Racing Technology—Lotus	59	(Venezuela) E. J. Viso	All
KV Racing Technology—Lotus	82	(Brazil) Tony Kanaan	All
Newman/Haas Racing	2	(Spain) Oriol Servià	All
Newman/Haas Racing	06	(Canada) James Hinchcliffe R	2–17
Panther Racing	4	(United States) J. R. Hildebrand R	All
Panther Racing	44	(United States) Buddy Rice	5, 16–17
Rahal Letterman Lanigan Racing	15	(United Kingdom) Jay Howard	17
Rahal Letterman Lanigan Racing	30	(Belgium) Bertrand Baguette	5
Rahal Letterman Lanigan Racing	30	(United Kingdom) Pippa Mann R	12, 16–17
Sam Schmidt Motorsports	77	(Canada) Alex Tagliani	1–15
Sam Schmidt Motorsports	77	(United Kingdom) Dan Wheldon	16–17
Sam Schmidt Motorsports	88	(United Kingdom) Jay Howard (Note: In conjunction with Rahal Letterman Lanigan Racing.)	5–6
Sam Schmidt Motorsports	99	(United States) Townsend Bell	5
Sam Schmidt Motorsports	99	(New Zealand) Wade Cunningham R	6
Sarah Fisher Racing	57	(South Africa) Tomas Scheckter	17
Sarah Fisher Racing	67	(United States) Ed Carpenter	5–8, 11–14, 16–17
SH Racing	07	(South Africa) Tomas Scheckter (Note: In conjunction with KV Racing Technology—Lotus at Indy and with Dreyer & Reinbold Racing at Baltimore.)	5, 14
Team Penske	3	(Brazil) Hélio Castroneves	All
Team Penske	6	(Australia) Ryan Briscoe	All
Team Penske	12	(Australia) Will Power	All

=== Team and driver movements ===
- Chip Ganassi Racing: Dario Franchitti and Scott Dixon returned to the team for 2011. Graham Rahal and Charlie Kimball joined the group as part of a satellite team ran out of the raceshop of Don Prudhomme.
- Team Penske: Shell and Pennzoil would join the team as an associate sponsor, motor oil partner and supplier for all three cars in 2011, replacing Mobil 1 and will sponsor the #3 car. Hélio Castroneves was signed to a multi-year contract that covers the 2011 season, and Will Power re-signed with Team Penske in September 2010. Roger Penske confirmed on November 12 that Ryan Briscoe would also be returning to the team. Izod was announced as being the primary sponsor on Ryan Briscoe's car and an associate sponsor on the other two cars.
- Andretti Autosport: Tony Kanaan was signed to a multi-year deal with Andretti Autosport before the 2009 season, and his contract is supposed to run through to 2012. On the October 3 it was confirmed that sponsor 7-Eleven would not return in 2011, rendering Kanaan a free agent. Marco Andretti was in the second year of a four-year contract with the team in 2011 along with his sponsor Venom Energy. It was announced on October 29 that Ryan Hunter-Reay would return to Andretti Autosport through to the 2012 season. DHL has signed a multi-year deal to sponsor Hunter-Reay's #28 car. Mike Conway was announced on February 2 as the team's 4th full-season driver. The team has confirmed John Andretti in the #43 for the Indy 500.
- Sam Schmidt Motorsports: Driver Alex Tagliani was in the second year of a four-year contract with the team. The team would also run cars for Townsend Bell and Jay Howard at the Indy 500, and for Wade Cunningham in three events. The team was committed to running a second full-time car in 2011, according to manager Rob Edwards. On March 1, 2011, it was announced that Sam Schmidt Motorsports had purchased the assets of FAZZT. Some FAZZT personnel would be retained for the 2011 season and Alex Tagliani will continue to contest all seventeen races.
- Bryan Herta Autosport: The team confirmed Dan Wheldon for the Indy 500. Bryan Herta Autosport and Wheldon would carry out testing of the 2012 Dallara chassis in August and September 2011.
- Dragon Racing: Tony Kanaan was announced as the new driver of the #2 car during a December 20 press conference in Brazil, however failure to secure sufficient sponsorship meant that Kanaan was unable to secure the drive. The team officially announced that they were shutting down on February 24, 2011; however following a restructuring, Jay Penske announced that Dragon Racing would continue with Paul Tracy for a limited schedule, as well as an Indy 500 entry. On May 3, 2011, the team confirmed Ho-Pin Tung would be the driver of the #8 Dragon-Schmidt Racing entry.
- SH Racing: On July 28, 2010, VPX Sports announced a partnership with newly formed SH Racing, run by James Sullivan and T.J. Humphreys, for an entry into the 2011 Indianapolis 500 with the driver yet to be named. The team would be partnering with KV Racing Technology. On March 29, 2011, the team announced South African veteran Tomas Scheckter will drive the #07 entry at the Indy 500.
- Panther Racing: 2010 team driver Dan Wheldon confirmed in a Kentucky post-race interview that his contract expired after the 2010 season and he was unlikely to return to the team in 2011. 2009 Indy Lights champion J. R. Hildebrand signed a multi-year deal to drive the #4 National Guard car for the team. The team would field former Indy 500 winner Buddy Rice in a second car at Indy.
- KV Racing Technology–Lotus: On September 28, 2010, it was announced that Lotus would provide sponsorship to two KV Racing Technology entries in 2011. On February 4, 2011, KV Racing confirmed that Takuma Sato and E. J. Viso would compete for the team for the 2011 IndyCar Series season. On March 21, 2011, it was reported that Tony Kanaan would join the team in a 3rd full-time entry.
- Dreyer & Reinbold Racing: On November 11, Justin Wilson announced he would continue racing with the team in 2011. On March 3, 2011, the team announced Ana Beatriz would be joining Wilson full-time as the pilot of the #24 entry. The team also confirmed Paul Tracy for the Indy 500, prior to his signing to drive part-time for Dragon Racing.
- Sarah Fisher Racing: SFR has signed Ed Carpenter for the 2011 season, who would compete in nine events. In addition, team owner Sarah Fisher has announced her retirement from driving to focus solely on team ownership.
- HVM Racing: Team owner Keith Wiggins has secured sponsorship to return with Simona de Silvestro for the 2011 season. The team announced a three-year deal with Entergy Nuclear to sponsor an entry.
- A. J. Foyt Enterprises: Driver Vítor Meira recently signed a two-year contract with the team through the 2012 season. The team would also field a car in the Indy 500 for Bruno Junqueira.
- Dale Coyne Racing: The team announced two new drivers for the season: rookie Englishman James Jakes, who would run the full season; and Sébastien Bourdais, who would run at all road and street courses only owing to his Le Mans Series commitments. The team would still be fielding a second car at Indianapolis. On May 5, 2011, it was confirmed that Alex Lloyd would compete on all the oval races, as Bourdais won't.
- Conquest Racing: On March 14, 2011, the team confirmed that Sebastián Saavedra would race for the team full-time during the 2011 season. On April 19, 2011, Conquest signed Indy Lights race-winner Pippa Mann to pilot the team's second car at Indianapolis.
- Rahal Letterman Lanigan Racing: Entrepreneur Mike Lanigan joined the ownership of the team on December 17, 2010, and the team was renamed Rahal Letterman Lanigan Racing. The team would run the Indy 500 in 2011 with Bertrand Baguette.
- AFS Racing: On January 13, 2011, AFS Racing announced that Neil Micklewright would be joining the team as General Manager and Vice President of Operations. On March 12, 2011, the team announced that they would run an entry at St. Petersburg, and on March 17, announced that series veteran Raphael Matos will drive.
- Newman/Haas Racing: After the open test at Barber and months of speculation, Spaniard Oriol Servià revealed that he would race for the eight-time championship-winning team. Canadian James Hinchcliffe, runner-up in the 2010 Indy Lights championship standings to Jean-Karl Vernay was confirmed for the team's second car on April 5, 2011, for all remaining races.

== Schedule ==
- The 2011 schedule contained the following 18 races.

Icon	Legend
O	Oval/Speedway
R	Road course
S	Street circuit

Rnd		Date	Race name	Track	Location
1		March 27	Honda Grand Prix of St. Petersburg	S Streets of St. Petersburg	(United States) St. Petersburg, Florida
2		April 10	Indy Grand Prix of Alabama	R Barber Motorsports Park	(United States) Birmingham, Alabama
3		April 17	Toyota Grand Prix of Long Beach	S Streets of Long Beach	(United States) Long Beach, California
4		May 1 May 2	Itaipava São Paulo Indy 300	S Streets of São Paulo	(Brazil) São Paulo, São Paulo
5		May 29	95th Indianapolis 500	O Indianapolis Motor Speedway	(United States) Speedway, Indiana
6	R1	June 11	Firestone Twin 275s	O Texas Motor Speedway	(United States) Fort Worth, Texas
6	R2	June 11	Firestone Twin 275s	O Texas Motor Speedway	(United States) Fort Worth, Texas
7		June 19	The Milwaukee 225	O Milwaukee Mile	(United States) West Allis, Wisconsin
8		June 25	Iowa Corn Indy 250	O Iowa Speedway	(United States) Newton, Iowa
9		July 10	Honda Indy Toronto	S Exhibition Place	(Canada) Toronto, Ontario
10		July 24	Edmonton Indy	R Edmonton City Centre Airport Speedway	(Canada) Edmonton, Alberta
11		August 7	Honda 200 at Mid-Ohio	R Mid-Ohio Sports Car Course	(United States) Lexington, Ohio
12		August 14	MoveThatBlock.com Indy 225	O New Hampshire Motor Speedway	(United States) Loudon, New Hampshire
13		August 28	Indy Grand Prix of Sonoma	R Infineon Raceway	(United States) Sonoma, California
14		September 4	Grand Prix of Baltimore	S Streets of Baltimore	(United States) Baltimore, Maryland
15		September 18	Indy Japan: The Final	R Twin Ring Motegi Road Course	(Japan) Motegi, Tochigi
16		October 2	Kentucky Indy 300	O Kentucky Speedway	(United States) Sparta, Kentucky
17		October 16	IZOD IndyCar World Championship	O Las Vegas Motor Speedway	(United States) Las Vegas, Nevada

- The São Paulo Indy 300 was started on Sunday, May 1, and was completed on Monday, May 2 following torrential rain.
- The Indy Japan 300 was moved from the oval to the road course at Twin Ring Motegi following damage to the oval caused by the 2011 Tōhoku earthquake and tsunami.

=== Schedule development ===
==== Existing contracts ====
- The São Paulo Indy 300 has a contract through 2019.
- The Honda Grand Prix of St. Petersburg will continue through 2013. City officials look to extend the contract through 2014.
- Iowa Speedway has been finalized a two-year extension through 2011.
- Infineon Raceway signed an extension through the 2011 season.
- An agreement has been signed with the city of Long Beach to extend the Toyota Grand Prix of Long Beach to 2015 with an option through 2020.
- Barber Motorsports Park signed a three-year deal through 2012.
- Mid-Ohio has a contract through 2011.
- The Octane Racing Group, who promotes the Formula 1 Grand Prix of Canada and the NASCAR Nationwide race at Circuit Gilles Villeneuve, will take over as promoters of the Honda Edmonton Indy, having agreed a three-year extension. The race was announced as "canceled" on November 3, 2010, due to an impasse in negotiations between the race promoters and the city of Edmonton. However, negotiations to revive the race restarted the next week. On November 26, 2010, the Edmonton, Alberta city council voted to restore the Honda Edmonton Indy using extra funding from private sources and new parking revenue. INDYCAR officially announced the race's return to the schedule on January 11, 2011.

==== New or returning races ====
- The Grand Prix of Baltimore made its debut on September 2–4, 2011. The event took place on a 2.4-mile street course around the Inner Harbor and Oriole Park at Camden Yards. The contract runs through the 2015 season.
- A race at New Hampshire Motor Speedway in Loudon, New Hampshire returned on August 14, 2011, as an official announcement took place prior to the June 27, 2010 Lenox Industrial Tools 301 NASCAR Sprint Cup Series race at the facility. The track last held an IndyCar event in 1998 and has since been sold to Speedway Motorsports, which has IndyCar races at Texas, Kentucky, and Infineon. The original date was set for July 31, but was moved following the 2011 NASCAR schedule realignment.
- The Milwaukee Mile returned to the schedule in 2011.
- The season finale was held at Las Vegas Motor Speedway. The IZOD IndyCar World Championship would offer a cash prize of $5 million to any driver who wins the race from another racing discipline and/or is not an IndyCar Series regular.

==== Discontinued races ====
- Chicagoland, Watkins Glen, Homestead, and Kansas—all tracks owned by ISC—would no longer host races this year.

== Results ==
Rd.		Race	Pole position	Fastest lap	Most laps led	Race winner		Report
Rd.		Race	Pole position	Fastest lap	Most laps led	Driver	Team	Report
1		St. Petersburg	(Australia) Will Power	(Brazil) Hélio Castroneves	(United Kingdom) Dario Franchitti	(United Kingdom) Dario Franchitti	(United States) Chip Ganassi Racing	Report
2		Barber	(Australia) Will Power	(New Zealand) Scott Dixon	(Australia) Will Power	(Australia) Will Power	(United States) Team Penske	Report
3		Long Beach	(Australia) Will Power	(United Kingdom) Dario Franchitti	(Australia) Ryan Briscoe	(United Kingdom) Mike Conway	(United States) Andretti Autosport	Report
4		São Paulo	(Australia) Will Power	(Switzerland) Simona de Silvestro	(Australia) Will Power	(Australia) Will Power	(United States) Team Penske	Report
5		Indianapolis	(Canada) Alex Tagliani	(United Kingdom) Dario Franchitti	(New Zealand) Scott Dixon	(United Kingdom) Dan Wheldon	(United States) Bryan Herta Autosport	Report
6	R1	Texas	(Canada) Alex Tagliani	(Venezuela) E. J. Viso	(United Kingdom) Dario Franchitti	(United Kingdom) Dario Franchitti	(United States) Chip Ganassi Racing	Report
6	R2	Texas	(Brazil) Tony Kanaan	(New Zealand) Scott Dixon	(Australia) Will Power	(Australia) Will Power	(United States) Team Penske	Report
7		Milwaukee	(United Kingdom) Dario Franchitti	(United Kingdom) Dario Franchitti	(United Kingdom) Dario Franchitti	(United Kingdom) Dario Franchitti	(United States) Chip Ganassi Racing	Report
8		Iowa	(Japan) Takuma Sato	(Canada) Alex Tagliani	(United Kingdom) Dario Franchitti	(United States) Marco Andretti	(United States) Andretti Autosport	Report
9		Toronto	(Australia) Will Power	(United Kingdom) Justin Wilson	(Australia) Will Power	(United Kingdom) Dario Franchitti	(United States) Chip Ganassi Racing	Report
10		Edmonton	(Japan) Takuma Sato	(France) Sébastien Bourdais	(Australia) Will Power	(Australia) Will Power	(United States) Team Penske	Report
11		Mid-Ohio	(New Zealand) Scott Dixon	(New Zealand) Scott Dixon	(New Zealand) Scott Dixon	(New Zealand) Scott Dixon	(United States) Chip Ganassi Racing	Report
12		New Hampshire	(United Kingdom) Dario Franchitti	(New Zealand) Scott Dixon	(United Kingdom) Dario Franchitti	(United States) Ryan Hunter-Reay	(United States) Andretti Autosport	Report
13		Sonoma	(Australia) Will Power	(Australia) Will Power	(Australia) Will Power	(Australia) Will Power	(United States) Team Penske	Report
14		Baltimore	(Australia) Will Power	(Australia) Will Power	(Australia) Will Power	(Australia) Will Power	(United States) Team Penske	Report
15		Motegi	(New Zealand) Scott Dixon	(Italy) Giorgio Pantano	(New Zealand) Scott Dixon	(New Zealand) Scott Dixon	(United States) Chip Ganassi Racing	Report
16		Kentucky	(Australia) Will Power	(United States) Ed Carpenter	(United Kingdom) Dario Franchitti	(United States) Ed Carpenter	(United States) Sarah Fisher Racing	Report
17		Las Vegas	(Brazil) Tony Kanaan	Race abandoned after 12 laps due to fatal crash of Dan Wheldon				Report

== Race summaries ==
=== Round 1: Honda Grand Prix of St. Petersburg ===
- Sunday March 27, 2011 – 1:00 p.m. EDT
- Streets of St. Petersburg – St. Petersburg, Florida; Temporary street circuit, 1.800 miles (2.897 km)
- Distance: 100 laps / 180.000 miles (289.682 km)
- Race weather: 85 °F (29 °C), partly cloudy
- Television: ABC (Marty Reid, Scott Goodyear, Vince Welch, Jamie Little, Rick DeBruhl)
- Nielsen ratings: 1.2 rating, 1.840 million viewers (1.4 overnight)
- Attendance: TBA
- Pole position winner: #12 Will Power, 1:01.9625 sec, 104.579 mph (168.304 km/h)
- Most laps led: #10 Dario Franchitti, 94
- Summary: The first race featuring the new double-file restarts takes a toll on the field as drivers adjust. On the first lap, a big collision involving several cars saw Marco Andretti flip over in turn 1, a crash he blamed on Hélio Castroneves. Several other drivers experienced contact on restarts, thinning the field. Dario Franchitti stayed in front for most of the race and won the season opener. Simona de Silvestro garnered the most attention of the later stages of the race, as she hotly challenged Tony Kanaan. Kanaan, who had landed his ride with KV Racing just days earlier, held her off over the final few laps for a surprising third-place finish.
- Race Report: 2011 Honda Grand Prix of St. Petersburg

Podium Finishers
Pos	Grid	No.	Driver	Team	Laps	Time	Led
1	2	10	(United Kingdom) Dario Franchitti	Chip Ganassi Racing	100	2:00:59.6886	94
2	1	12	(Australia) Will Power	Team Penske	100	+7.1612	6
3	8	82	(Brazil) Tony Kanaan	KV Racing Technology–Lotus	100	+16.1045	0
Race average speed: 89.260 mph (143.650 km/h)
Lead changes: 3 between 2 drivers
Cautions: 5 for 13 laps

=== Round 2: Indy Grand Prix of Alabama presented by Legacy ===
- Sunday April 10, 2011 – 2:45 p.m. CDT (3:45 p.m. EDT)
- Barber Motorsports Park – Birmingham, Alabama; Permanent road course, 2.300 miles (3.701 km)
- Distance: 90 laps / 207.000 miles (333.134 km)
- Race weather: 84 °F (29 °C), clear skies
- Television: Versus (Bob Jenkins, Jon Beekhuis, Wally Dallenbach Jr., Lindy Thackston, Marty Snider, Kevin Lee, Robin Miller)
- Nielsen ratings: 0.3
- Attendance: 48,326 (race day), 79,811 (weekend)
- Pole position winner: #12 Will Power, 1:11.4546 sec, 115.878 mph (186.488 km/h)
- Most laps led: #12 Will Power, 90
- Summary: Will Power led wire-to-wire to take the victory. Twice Ryan Briscoe was involved in contact, first with Dario Franchitti, and later with Ryan Hunter-Reay. Following the race, second-place finisher Scott Dixon complained about Power "crowding" him on the restarts, but no penalty was assessed.
- Race Report: 2011 Indy Grand Prix of Alabama

Podium Finishers
Pos	Grid	No.	Driver	Team	Laps	Time	Led
1	1	12	(Australia) Will Power	Team Penske	90	2:14:42.9523	90
2	3	9	(New Zealand) Scott Dixon	Chip Ganassi Racing	90	+3.3828	0
3	7	10	(United Kingdom) Dario Franchitti	Chip Ganassi Racing	90	+15.5243	0
Race average speed: 92.194 mph (148.372 km/h)
Lead changes: None
Cautions: 6 for 20 laps

=== Round 3: Toyota Grand Prix of Long Beach ===
- Sunday April 17, 2011 – 1:30 p.m. PDT (4:30 p.m. EDT)
- Streets of Long Beach – Long Beach, California; Temporary street circuit, 1.968 miles (3.167 km)
- Distance: 85 laps / 167.280 miles (269.211 km)
- Race weather: 66 °F (19 °C), partly cloudy
- Television: Versus (Bob Jenkins, Jon Beekhuis, Wally Dallenbach Jr., Lindy Thackston, Marty Snider, Kevin Lee, Robin Miller)
- Nielsen ratings: 0.28
- Attendance: 70,000 (estimated raceday), 175,000+ (estimated weekend)
- Pole position winner: #12 Will Power, 1:09.0649 sec, 102.582 mph (165.090 km/h)
- Most laps led: #6 Ryan Briscoe, 35
- Summary: With less than 20 laps to go, Mike Conway charged into third place on a restart. He quickly powered past Dario Franchitti and Will Power to take the lead. Conway pulled out to a six-second advantage, and led the final 14 laps en route to his first Indy car victory. For the second time this season, Hélio Castroneves was blamed for a collision, this time taking himself and teammate Will Power out of contention late in the race.
- Race Report: 2011 Toyota Grand Prix of Long Beach

Podium Finishers
Pos	Grid	No.	Driver	Team	Laps	Time	Led
1	3	27	(United Kingdom) Mike Conway	Andretti Autosport	85	1:53:11.1000	14
2	12	6	(Australia) Ryan Briscoe	Team Penske	85	+6.3203	35
3	7	10	(United Kingdom) Dario Franchitti	Chip Ganassi Racing	85	+6.7163	0
Race average speed: 88.676 mph (142.710 km/h)
Lead changes: 7 between 6 drivers
Cautions: 3 for 12 laps

=== Round 4: Itaipava São Paulo Indy 300 presented by Nestle ===
- Sunday May 1, 2011 – 1:20 p.m. BRT (12:20 p.m. EDT) & Monday May 2, 2011 – 9:05 a.m. BRT (8:05 a.m. EDT)
- Streets of São Paulo – São Paulo, Brazil; Temporary street circuit, 2.536 miles (4.081 km)
- Distance: 75 laps / 190.200 miles (306.097 km); reduced to 55 laps / 139.480 miles (224.471 km) due to rain and two-hour time limit.
- Race weather: 93 °F (34 °C), scattered showers (Sunday); 79 °F (26 °C), scattered clouds (Monday)
- Television: Versus (Bob Jenkins, Jon Beekhuis, Wally Dallenbach Jr., Robin Miller(May 1), Davey Hamilton(May 2), Kevin Lee
- Nielsen ratings: 0.51 (Sunday), 0.21 (Monday)
- Attendance: 41,000 (Sunday)
- Pole position winner: #12 Will Power, 1:21.8958 sec, 111.478 mph (179.406 km/h)
- Most laps led: #12 Will Power, 32
- Summary:
- Race Report: 2011 São Paulo Indy 300
- Summary: Rain forced a postponement of the race after 15 laps. On Monday morning, the race resumed. Leader Will Power pitted for fuel on lap 36, giving the lead to Takuma Sato. With rain soaking the course, Sato's team hoped to stretch out their fuel window in hopes of a caution, and the possibility of leading the race when the time limit expired. Sato was forced to pit on lap 48, and Power retook the lead. The race ended after 55 laps with Power the victor.

Podium Finishers
Pos	Grid	No.	Driver	Team	Laps	Time	Led
1	1	12	(Australia) Will Power	Team Penske	55	2:04:05.2964	32
2	5	38	(United States) Graham Rahal	Chip Ganassi Racing	55	+4.6723	0
3	4	6	(Australia) Ryan Briscoe	Team Penske	55	+7.9037	0
Race average speed: 67.442 mph (108.537 km/h)
Lead changes: 2 between 2 drivers
Cautions: 6 for 21 laps

=== Round 5: 95th Indianapolis 500 ===
- Sunday May 29, 2011 – 12:15 p.m. EDT
- Indianapolis Motor Speedway – Speedway, Indiana; Permanent racing facility, 2.500 miles (4.023 km)
- Distance: 200 laps / 500.000 miles (804.672 km)
- Race weather: 86 °F (30 °C), cloudy
- Television: ABC (Marty Reid, Scott Goodyear, Eddie Cheever, Brent Musburger, Vince Welch, Jamie Little, Rick DeBruhl, Jerry Punch)
- Nielsen ratings: 4.0, 6.71 million viewers (4.3 overnight)
- Attendance: 300,000
- Pole position winner: #77 Alex Tagliani, 2:38.2613 sec, 227.790 mph (366.592 km/h) (4-lap)
- Most laps led: #9 Scott Dixon, 73
- Summary: Ganassi teammates Scott Dixon and Dario Franchitti led 124 laps, but the race came down to the final few laps as several drivers pitted for fuel. Rookie J. R. Hildebrand took the lead with three laps to go, and led at the white flag. Coming out of the final turn on the final lap, Hildebrand hit the outside wall, and Dan Wheldon drove by to take the victory, which would turn out to be his last.
- Race Report: 2011 Indianapolis 500

Top Three Finishers
Fin. Pos	St. Pos	Car No.	Driver	Team	Laps	Time	Laps Led
1	6	98	(United Kingdom) Dan Wheldon	Bryan Herta Autosport	200	2:56:11.7267	1
2	12	4	(United States) J. R. Hildebrand	Panther Racing	200	+2.1086	7
3	29	38	(United States) Graham Rahal	Chip Ganassi Racing	200	+5.5949	6
Race average speed: 170.265 mph (274.015 km/h)
Lead changes: 23 between 10 drivers
Cautions: 7 for 40 laps

=== Round 6: Firestone Twin 275s ===
- Saturday June 11, 2011 – 7:45 p.m. CDT (8:45 p.m. EDT)
- Texas Motor Speedway – Fort Worth, Texas; Permanent racing facility, 1.455 miles (2.342 km)
- Distance: 2 races of 114 laps / 165.870 miles (266.942 km)
- Race weather: 91 °F (33 °C), clear skies (Race 1); 87 °F (31 °C), clear skies (Race 2)
- Television: Versus (Bob Jenkins, Jon Beekhuis, Dan Wheldon, Lindy Thackston, Robbie Floyd, Kevin Lee, Robin Miller)
- Nielsen ratings: 0.55 rating, (0.38 overnight)
- Attendance: 73,000 (announced crowd)
- Pole position winner: #77 Alex Tagliani, 48.6834 sec, 215.186 mph (346.308 km/h) (Race 1, 2-lap qualifying); #82 Tony Kanaan (Race 2, draw)
- Most laps led: #10 Dario Franchitti, 110 (Race 1); #12 Will Power, 68 (Race 2)
- Race Report: 2011 Firestone Twin 275s
- Summary: The popular "twin race" format from the 1970s and early 1980s returned to Indy car racing at Texas. Dario Franchitti dominated the first race, which saw only one caution. Wade Cunningham and Charlie Kimball crashed on lap 92, with Cunningham crashing Dan Wheldon's Indy 500 winning car from two weeks prior. At halftime, the drivers chose their starting positions for race #2 by a blind draw on a stage on the frontstretch. Tony Kanaan was the lucky driver who picked position number 1. Will Power picked starting position #3, but the winner of the first race, Franchitti, was mired back in 28th starting position. Controversy followed the race, as many in the paddock believed the blind draw was an unfair method to select the starting positions (many thought they should have simply inverted the field). The second race went without a caution, and Power went on to win. Franchitti was not a factor, but charged all the way to 7th at the finish.

Race One – Top Three Finishers								Race Two – Top Three Finishers							
Fin. Pos	St. Pos	Car No.	Driver	Team	Laps	Time	Laps Led	Fin. Pos	St. Pos	Car No.	Driver	Team	Laps	Time	Laps Led
1	2	10	(United Kingdom) Dario Franchitti	Chip Ganassi Racing	114	54:47.2787	110	1	3	12	(Australia) Will Power	Team Penske	114	48:08.9739	68
2	7	9	(New Zealand) Scott Dixon	Chip Ganassi Racing	114	+0.0527	1	2	18	9	(New Zealand) Scott Dixon	Chip Ganassi Racing	114	+0.9466	1
3	3	12	(Australia) Will Power	Team Penske	114	+0.2064	0	3	12	6	(Australia) Ryan Briscoe	Team Penske	114	+4.6524	3
Race average speed: 181.649 mph (292.336 km/h)								Race average speed: 206.693 mph (332.640 km/h)							
Lead changes: 6 between 5 drivers								Lead changes: 8 between 6 drivers							
Cautions: 1 for 10 laps								Cautions: None							

=== Round 7: Milwaukee 225 ===
- Sunday June 19, 2011 – 3:00 p.m. CDT (4:00 p.m. EDT)
- Milwaukee Mile – West Allis, Wisconsin; Permanent racing facility, 1.015 miles (1.633 km)
- Distance: 225 laps / 228.375 miles (367.534 km)
- Race weather: 79 °F (26 °C), scattered clouds
- Television: ABC (Marty Reid, Scott Goodyear, Vince Welch, Jamie Little, Rick DeBruhl)
- Nielsen ratings: 0.8
- Attendance: 15,000
- Pole position winner: #10 Dario Franchitti, 42.7766 sec, 170.841 mph (274.942 km/h) (2-lap)
- Most laps led: #10 Dario Franchitti, 161
- Race Report: 2011 Milwaukee 225
- Summary: Tony Kanaan led 33 laps in the second half, but crashed into the turn 4 wall with only 30 laps to go. Leader Hélio Castroneves was forced to the pits on lap 199 to change a flat tire, giving the lead, and the win, to Dario Franchitti.

Top Three Finishers
Fin. Pos	St. Pos	Car No.	Driver	Team	Laps	Time	Laps Led
1	1	10	(United Kingdom) Dario Franchitti	Chip Ganassi Racing	225	1:56:43.5877	161
2	12	38	(United States) Graham Rahal	Chip Ganassi Racing	225	+1.4271	0
3	10	2	(Spain) Oriol Servià	Newman/Haas Racing	225	+2.7703	0
Race average speed: 117.390 mph (188.921 km/h)
Lead changes: 5 between 3 drivers
Cautions: 6 for 62 laps

=== Round 8: Iowa Corn Indy 250 ===
- Saturday June 25, 2011 – 8:00 p.m. CDT (9:00 p.m. EDT)
- Iowa Speedway – Newton, Iowa; Permanent racing facility, 0.894 miles (1.439 km)
- Distance: 250 laps / 223.500 miles (359.688 km)
- Race weather: 64 °F (18 °C), overcast
- Television: Versus (Bob Jenkins, Jon Beekhuis, Dan Wheldon, Lindy Thackston, Robbie Floyd, Kevin Lee, Robin Miller)
- Nielsen ratings: 0.35 (overnight)
- Attendance: 35,118
- Pole position winner: #5 Takuma Sato, 35.6857 sec, 180.375 mph (290.285 km/h) (2-lap)
- Most laps led: #10 Dario Franchitti, 172
- Race Report: 2011 Iowa Corn Indy 250
- Summary: Marco Andretti charged from 17th starting position to second by lap 152. Andretti passed Dario Franchitti to take the lead on lap 157. After a pit stop, Andretti dueled with Tony Kanaan for the lead over the final 50–60 laps, with Andretti taking the lead for good on lap 232.

Top Three Finishers
Fin. Pos	St. Pos	Car No.	Driver	Team	Laps	Time	Laps Led
1	17	26	(United States) Marco Andretti	Andretti Autosport	250	1:53:00.1074	42
2	3	82	(Brazil) Tony Kanaan	KV Racing Technology–Lotus	250	+0.7932	25
3	23	9	(New Zealand) Scott Dixon	Chip Ganassi Racing	250	+1.1067	0
Race average speed: 118.671 mph (190.982 km/h)
Lead changes: 9 between 5 drivers
Cautions: 5 for 72 laps

=== Round 9: Honda Indy Toronto ===
- Sunday July 10, 2011 – 2:50 p.m. EDT
- Streets of Toronto – Toronto, Ontario; Temporary street circuit, 1.755 miles (2.824 km)
- Distance: 85 laps / 149.175 miles (240.074 km)
- Race weather: 75 °F (24 °C), overcast
- Television: Versus (Bob Jenkins, Wally Dallenbach Jr., Jon Beekhuis, Dan Wheldon, Lindy Thackston, Robbie Floyd, Kevin Lee, Robin Miller)
- Nielsen ratings: 0.50 rating, (0.41 overnight)
- Attendance: 20,000–25,000 (media estimated raceday)
- Pole position winner: #12 Will Power, 59.5771 sec, 106.047 mph (170.666 km/h)
- Most laps led: #12 Will Power, 32
- Race Report: 2011 Honda Indy Toronto
- Summary: At least 18 cars were involved in scuffles and contact throughout the race, with six dropping out. On lap 56, Dario Franchitti clipped wheels with leader Will Power in the hairpin, causing Power to spin out. Franchitti slipped by to take the lead, and held on to win. Power was visibly upset because it was reported that race-control penalized Franchitti for it and reversed the penalty. However competition director Al Unser Jr. said he did not penalize Franchitti at all because it was a racing incident.

Podium Finishers
Pos	Grid	No.	Driver	Team	Laps	Time	Led
1	3	10	(United Kingdom) Dario Franchitti	Chip Ganassi Racing	85	1:56:32.1501	30
2	2	9	(New Zealand) Scott Dixon	Chip Ganassi Racing	85	+0.7345	0
3	8	28	(United States) Ryan Hunter-Reay	Andretti Autosport	85	+6.0144	0
Race average speed: 76.805 mph (123.606 km/h)
Lead changes: 3 between 3 drivers
Cautions: 8 for 32 laps

=== Round 10: Edmonton Indy ===
- Sunday July 24, 2011 – 12:50 p.m. MDT (2:50 p.m. EDT)
- Edmonton City Centre Airport – Edmonton, Alberta; Temporary airport course, 2.224 miles (3.579 km)
- Distance: 80 laps / 177.920 miles (286.334 km)
- Race weather: 69 °F (21 °C), clear skies
- Television: Versus (Bob Jenkins, Wally Dallenbach Jr., Jon Beekhuis, Robbie Floyd, Lindy Thackston, Kevin Lee, Robin Miller)
- Nielsen ratings: 0.6
- Attendance:
- Pole position winner: #5 Takuma Sato, 1:18.5165 sec, 101.971 mph (164.106 km/h)
- Most laps led: #12 Will Power, 57
- Race Report: 2011 Edmonton Indy
- Summary: The race took place on a new layout for 2011. On the first lap, Alex Tagliani made contact with Graham Rahal as the field negotiated the tight turn 5, which took out four cars. Later in the race, Ryan Hunter-Reay tangled with polesitter Takuma Sato, also in turn 5. Will Power took the lead on lap 20, and Penske managed a 1-2 finish.

Podium Finishers
Fin. Pos	St. Pos	Car No.	Driver	Team	Laps	Time	Laps Led
1	2	12	(Australia) Will Power	Team Penske	80	1:57:22.5177	57
2	9	3	(Brazil) Hélio Castroneves	Team Penske	80	+0.8089	1
3	4	10	(United Kingdom) Dario Franchitti	Chip Ganassi Racing	80	+1.1735	2
Race average speed: 90.949 mph (146.368 km/h)
Lead changes: 6 between 5 drivers
Cautions: 2 for 8 laps

=== Round 11: Honda Indy 200 ===
- Sunday August 7, 2011 – 2:50 p.m. EDT
- Mid-Ohio Sports Car Course – Lexington, Ohio; Permanent racing facility, 2.258 miles (3.634 km)
- Distance: 85 laps / 191.930 miles (308.881 km)
- Race weather: 87 °F (31 °C), partly cloudy
- Television: Versus (Bob Jenkins, Wally Dallenbach Jr., Jon Beekhuis, Marty Snider, Lindy Thackston, Kevin Lee, Robin Miller)
- Nielsen ratings: 0.2
- Attendance:
- Pole position winner: #9 Scott Dixon, 1:08.0776 sec, 119.405 mph (192.164 km/h)
- Most laps led: #9 Scott Dixon, 50
- Race Report: 2011 Honda Indy 200
- Summary: Scott Dixon edged teammate Dario Franchitti down the backstretch on a restart on lap 61, and held on to win at Mid-Ohio for the third time in five seasons. Will Power dropped to 14th after getting caught out under a full-course caution during a sequence of pit stops.

Top Three Finishers
Fin. Pos	St. Pos	Car No.	Driver	Team	Laps	Time	Laps Led
1	1	9	(New Zealand) Scott Dixon	Chip Ganassi Racing	85	1:48:46.9509	50
2	3	10	(United Kingdom) Dario Franchitti	Chip Ganassi Racing	85	+7.6508	4
3	5	28	(United States) Ryan Hunter-Reay	Andretti Autosport	85	+9.0784	0
Race average speed: 105.861 mph (170.367 km/h)
Lead changes: 7 between 5 drivers
Cautions: 2 for 9 laps

=== Round 12: MoveThatBlock.com Indy 225 ===
- Sunday August 14, 2011 – 3:30 p.m. EDT
- New Hampshire Motor Speedway – Loudon, New Hampshire; Permanent racing facility, 1.025 miles (1.650 km)
- Distance: 225 laps / 230.625 miles (371.155 km); reduced to 215 laps / 220.375 miles (354.659 km) due to rain
- Race weather: 73 °F (23 °C), cloudy
- Television: ABC (Marty Reid, Scott Goodyear, Gary Gerould, Jamie Little, Rick DeBruhl)
- Nielsen ratings: 0.9 (overnight)
- Attendance: 30,000
- Pole position winner: #10 Dario Franchitti, 43.1976 sec, 170.843 mph (274.945 km/h) (2-lap)
- Most laps led: #10 Dario Franchitti, 115
- Race Report: 2011 MoveThatBlock.com Indy 225
- Summary:

Indy car racing returned to New Hampshire after a 13-year sabbatical. Dario Franchitti dominated the first half, but on a restart on lap 118, he touched wheels with Takuma Sato and crashed into the inside wall. On lap 206, the caution came out for rain, with Ryan Hunter-Reay leading. Despite the drivers pleading to their crews that the track was too wet to continue, officials decided to bring the green flag out with 7 laps to go. As the field accelerated, Danica Patrick spun on the frontstretch due to the wet conditions, which led to a controversial five-car pileup, involving championship contender Will Power among others. During the restart attempt, Oriol Servià passed Hunter-Reay as the restart began but before the caution was signaled, leading to controversy when the decision was made to abort the restart, a move common in USAC when a false start occurs, which typically means the cars return to their starting order for another start attempt. Officials accepted blame for the decision and red flagged the race. Scoring was reverted to the standings prior to the restart attempt.

Within 30 minutes of the end of the race, Newman/Haas Racing and Chip Ganassi Racing filed protests regarding the finish of the race because of Servià's pass of Hunter-Reay on the aborted restart. The results of the race were not made official, and as a result of the protest, the finish was under review. Indy Racing League, LLC announced on August 16 that a hearing was scheduled for the week of August 22 on both protests filed, and the hearing would also include Andretti Autosport, as the results of the hearing may have resulted in the finishing order being changed. The hearing took place on August 23, with the finishing positions being upheld.

Top Three Finishers
Fin. Pos	St. Pos	Car No.	Driver	Team	Laps	Time	Laps Led
1	5	28	(United States) Ryan Hunter-Reay	Andretti Autosport	215	1:58:01.5843	71
2	2	2	(Spain) Oriol Servià	Newman/Haas Racing	215	+0.2361*	0
3	7	9	(New Zealand) Scott Dixon	Chip Ganassi Racing	215	+1.4839	2
* Under caution
Race average speed: 112.030 mph (180.295 km/h)
Lead changes: 7 between 6 drivers
Cautions: 6 for 66 laps

=== Round 13: Indy Grand Prix of Sonoma ===
- Sunday August 28, 2011 – 1:50 p.m. PDT (4:50 p.m. EDT)
- Infineon Raceway – Sonoma, California; Permanent racing facility, 2.303 miles (3.706 km)
- Distance: 75 laps / 172.725 miles (277.974 km)
- Race weather: 75 °F (24 °C), clear skies
- Television: Versus (Bob Jenkins, Wally Dallenbach Jr., Jon Beekhuis, Marty Snider, Lindy Thackston, Kevin Lee, Robin Miller)
- Nielsen ratings: 0.3
- Attendance:
- Pole position winner: #12 Will Power, 1:18.6017 sec, 105.479 mph (169.752 km/h)
- Most laps led: #12 Will Power, 71
- Race Report: 2011 Indy Grand Prix of Sonoma
- Summary: Will Power led 71 of 75 laps, as Team Penske swept 1st-2nd-3rd on the podium. It was the first 1-2-3 finish in an Indycar race for Penske since Nazareth in 1994. Power closed to within 26 points of championship leader Dario Franchitti. Power also closed within 7 points of Franchitti for the Mario Andretti Road Course Trophy. Simon Pagenaud substituted for Simona de Silvestro after she had complications renewing her visa, and U.S. Customs would not allow her into the country.

Top Three Finishers
Fin. Pos	St. Pos	Car No.	Driver	Team	Laps	Time	Laps Led
1	1	12	(Australia) Will Power	Team Penske	75	1:47:29.7619	71
2	2	3	(Brazil) Hélio Castroneves	Team Penske	75	+3.2420	0
3	3	6	(Australia) Ryan Briscoe	Team Penske	75	+6.4494	4
Race average speed: 96.408 mph (155.154 km/h)
Lead changes: 4 between 2 drivers
Cautions: 1 for 3 laps

=== Round 14: Baltimore Grand Prix ===
- Sunday September 4, 2011 – 2:45 p.m. EDT
- Streets of Baltimore – Baltimore, Maryland; Temporary street circuit, 2.040 miles (3.283 km)
- Distance: 75 laps / 153.000 miles (246.230 km)
- Race weather: 85 °F (29 °C), scattered clouds
- Television: Versus (Bob Jenkins, Wally Dallenbach Jr., Jon Beekhuis, Marty Snider, Lindy Thackston, Kevin Lee, Robin Miller)
- Nielsen ratings: 0.6
- Attendance: 75,000 (estimated raceday), 150,000+ (estimated weekend)
- Pole position winner: #12 Will Power, 1:20.2447 sec, 91.520 mph (147.287 km/h)
- Most laps led: #12 Will Power, 70
- Race Report: 2011 Baltimore Grand Prix
- Summary: The inaugural IndyCar race in Baltimore saw a large crowd, and a challenging course, with many deeming the race a popular success. Will Power led 70 of 75 laps en route to a dominating victory, closing the points lead to only 5 points with three races remaining. During practice, Tony Kanaan lost his brakes, touched wheels with Hélio Castroneves' car, and jumped over his car into the tire barrier. Kanaan was unhurt, but was forced to start the race from the rear in a back-up car, which he drove to a 3rd-place finish. On lap 38, Ryan Briscoe clipped Ryan Hunter-Reay's car in the hairpin, creating a chain reaction pileup that involved or blocked as many as 18 cars.

Top Three Finishers
Fin. Pos	St. Pos	Car No.	Driver	Team	Laps	Time	Laps Led
1	1	12	(Australia) Will Power	Team Penske	75	2:02:19.4998	70
2	14	2	(Spain) Oriol Servià	Newman/Haas Racing	75	+10.2096	0
3	27	82	(Brazil) Tony Kanaan	KV Racing Technology–Lotus	75	+10.8557	0
Race average speed: 75.046 mph (120.775 km/h)
Lead changes: 7 between 5 drivers
Cautions: 2 for 16 laps

=== Round 15: Indy Japan: The Final ===
- Sunday September 18, 2011 – 1:00 p.m. JST (12:00 a.m. EDT)
- Twin Ring Motegi – Motegi, Tochigi; Permanent racing facility, 2.983 miles (4.801 km)
- Distance: 63 laps / 187.929 miles (302.442 km)
- Race weather: 88 °F (31 °C), scattered clouds
- Television: Versus (Bob Jenkins, Wally Dallenbach Jr., Jon Beekhuis, Kevin Lee)
- Nielsen ratings: 0.50
- Attendance:
- Pole position winner: #9 Scott Dixon, 1:38.3918 sec, 109.143 mph (175.649 km/h)
- Most laps led: #9 Scott Dixon, 62
- Race Report: 2011 Indy Japan: The Final
- Summary: Scott Dixon led 62 of 63 laps, dominating the final Indycar race at Twin Ring Motegi. Following the 2011 earthquake and tsunami in Japan, the race was moved to the 2.98 mile road course due to damage to the oval. On lap 26, points leader Dario Franchitti tangled with Ryan Briscoe, causing a spin that also collected Graham Rahal. Franchitti was penalized for the move, and sent to the rear of the field. He worked his way back up to an 8th-place finish. Will Power's second-place finish allowed him to clinch the 2011 Mario Andretti Road Course Trophy, and took the lead (+5 points) in the overall points standing with two races left.

Top Three Finishers
Fin. Pos	St. Pos	Car No.	Driver	Team	Laps	Time	Laps Led
1	1	9	(New Zealand) Scott Dixon	Chip Ganassi Racing	63	1:56:41.0107	62
2	2	12	(Australia) Will Power	Team Penske	63	+3.4375	1
3	10	26	(United States) Marco Andretti	Andretti Autosport	63	+4.4782	0
Race average speed: 96.635 mph (155.519 km/h)
Lead changes: 2 between 2 drivers
Cautions: 3 for 8 laps

=== Round 16: Kentucky Indy 300 ===
- Sunday October 2, 2011 – 2:45 p.m. EDT
- Kentucky Speedway – Sparta, Kentucky; Permanent racing facility, 1.480 miles (2.382 km)
- Distance: 200 laps / 296.000 miles (476.366 km)
- Race weather: 62 °F (17 °C), partly cloudy
- Television: Versus (Bob Jenkins, Wally Dallenbach Jr., Jon Beekhuis, Marty Snider, Kevin Lee, Lindy Thackston, Robin Miller)
- Nielsen ratings: 0.43
- Attendance:
- Pole position winner: #12 Will Power, 48.5948 sec, 219.283 mph (352.902 km/h) (2-lap)
- Most laps led: #10 Dario Franchitti, 143
- Race Report: 2011 Kentucky Indy 300
- Race Summary: Ed Carpenter battled Dario Franchitti side by side over the final 20 laps, and held off Franchitti to earn his first-career IndyCar Series victory. Polesitter Will Power entered the race with the championship lead – 11 points over Franchitti – and led the first 48 laps. However, during a pit stop on lap 49, Ana Beatriz made contact with his car as she was exiting her pit stall, ripping a gash in Power's sidepod. Power came home in 19th, and second-place Franchitti took over the points lead going into the final race of the season.

Top Three Finishers
Pos	Grid	No.	Driver	Team	Laps	Time	Led
1	4	67	(United States) Ed Carpenter	Sarah Fisher Racing	200	1:42:02.7825	8
2	11	10	(United Kingdom) Dario Franchitti	Chip Ganassi Racing	200	+0.0098	143
3	7	9	(New Zealand) Scott Dixon	Chip Ganassi Racing	200	+0.1048	0
Race average speed: 174.039 mph (280.089 km/h)
Lead changes: 7 between 4 drivers
Cautions: 3 for 32 laps

=== Round 17: IZOD IndyCar World Championship ===
- Sunday October 16, 2011 – 12:45 p.m. PDT (3:45 p.m. EDT)
- Las Vegas Motor Speedway – Clark County, Nevada; Permanent racing facility, 1.544 miles (2.485 km)
- Distance: 200 laps / 308.800 miles (496.965 km)
- Race weather: 87 °F (31 °C), partly cloudy
- Television: ABC (Marty Reid, Scott Goodyear, Eddie Cheever, Vince Welch, Jamie Little, Rick DeBruhl)
- Nielsen ratings: 1.6
- Attendance: 50,000 (Sunday – two races), 75,000 (total; includes Smith's 350 NASCAR Camping World Truck Series race on Saturday).
- Pole position winner: #82 Tony Kanaan, 50.0582 sec, 222.078 mph (357.400 km/h) (2-lap)
- Most laps led: Tony Kanaan (race abandoned)
- Race Report: 2011 IZOD IndyCar World Championship
- Summary: The race was marred by a 15-car pileup on the 11th lap and four drivers – Dan Wheldon, Will Power, J. R. Hildebrand and Pippa Mann – were taken to the hospital while the race was red-flagged. The race was abandoned two hours later with the announcement that Wheldon had died from his injuries, and the remaining drivers completed a five-lap salute to honor Wheldon's memory. Power was later released from the hospital, while Mann and Hildebrand were kept under observation, but were later released. Mann suffered a burn to her hand and Hildebrand suffered a bruised sternum. IndyCar does not use the FIA Code on race stoppages (which states a race is official once a race is on the fourth lap) and uses the customary 50% plus one lap rule (101 laps in this case). The race results were stricken from the record book, and the statistics did not count. Franchitti was declared the series champion, although he would have won the championship anyway had the race continued since Power suffered injuries in the crash.

== Points standings ==
- Ties in points broken by number of wins, followed by number of 2nds, 3rds, etc., and then by number of pole positions, followed by number of times qualified 2nd, etc.

=== Driver standings ===
- One point is awarded to any driver who leads at least one lap during a race. Two additional points are awarded to the driver who leads the most laps in a race.
- At Texas, the event is split into two half-distance races on the same day. Each one awards half points.
- Bonus points are awarded for qualifying performance:
  - At all tracks except Indianapolis, the driver who qualifies on pole earns one point.
  - At Indianapolis, drivers who advance to Q2 earn bonus points. Drivers who qualify tenth through twenty-fourth earn four qualifying points, and the remaining qualifying drivers earn three points.
  - At Texas, the grid for the second race is set by a draw, and no bonus point is awarded for the pole position.

Pos	Driver	STP	BAR	LBH	SAO	INDY	TMS		MIL	IOW	TOR	EDM	MOH	NHS	SON	BAL	MOT	KEN	LVS^{1}	Pts
Pos	Driver	STP	BAR	LBH	SAO	INDY	R1	R2	MIL	IOW	TOR	EDM	MOH	NHS	SON	BAL	MOT	KEN	LVS^{1}	Pts
1	(United Kingdom) Dario Franchitti	1*	3	3	4	12^{9}	1*	7	**1***	5*	1	3	2	**20***	4	4	8	2*	C	573
2	(Australia) Will Power	**2**	**1***	**10**	**1***	14^{5}	3	1*	4	21	**24***	1*	14	5	**1***	**1***	2	**19**	C	555
3	(New Zealand) Scott Dixon	16	2	18	12	5*^{2}	2	2	7	3	2	23	**1***	3	5	5	**1***	3	C	518
4	(Spain) Oriol Servià	9	5	6	5	6^{3}	21	15	3	14	12	22	8	2	11	2	5	6	C	425
5	(Brazil) Tony Kanaan	3	6	8	22	4^{23}	11	**5**^{d}	19	2	26	4	5	22	28	3	17	17	**C**	366
6	(Australia) Ryan Briscoe	18	21	2*	3	27^{27}	6	3	11	6	7	10	16	8	3	14	20	8	C	364
7	(United States) Ryan Hunter-Reay	21	14	23	18	23^{NQ}	19	9	26	8	3	7	3	1	10	8	24	5	C	347
8	(United States) Marco Andretti	24	4	26	14	9^{28}	13	6	13	1	4	14	7	24	24	25	3	27	C	337
9	(United States) Graham Rahal	17	18	13	2	3^{30}	9	30	2	15	13	25	24	26	8	10	12	12	C	320
10	(United States) Danica Patrick	12	17	7	23	10^{26}	16	8	5	10	19	9	21	6	21	6	11	10	C	314
11	(Brazil) Hélio Castroneves	20	7	12	21	17^{16}	10	4	9	7	17	2	19	17	2	17	22	29	C	312
12	(Canada) James Hinchcliffe RY		24	4	9	29^{13}	20	19	6	9	14	15	20	4	7	24	15	4	C	302
13	(Japan) Takuma Sato	5	16	21	8	33^{10}	5	12	8	**19**	20	**21**	4	7	18	18	10	15	C	297
14	(United States) J. R. Hildebrand R	11	13	17	10	2^{12}	23	18	21	4	8	11	25	21	23	19	7	20	C	296
15	(Canada) Alex Tagliani	6	15	5	19	**28**^{1}	**4**	14	18	16	23	17	6	19	20	7	4		C	296
16	(Brazil) Vítor Meira	8	12	9	17	15^{11}	8	11	24	18	5	12	10	10	22	9	25	16	C	287
17	(United Kingdom) Mike Conway	23	22	1	6	DNQ	24	17	12	24	22	8	26	25	16	23	9	18	C	260
18	(Venezuela) E. J. Viso	19	23	25	13	32^{18}	7	10	20	17	9	20	15	12	9	15	21	23	C	241
19	(United States) Charlie Kimball R	22	10	24	16	13^{29}	30	23	14	22	21	19	11	9	26	21	23	13	C	233
20	(Switzerland) Simona de Silvestro	4	9	20	20	31^{24}	26	27	25	DNP**^{2}**	10	24	12	16		12	14	25	C	225
21	(Brazil) Ana Beatriz R	14		19	24	21^{33}	22	22	17	23	11	13	17	14	13	16	19	24	C	212
22	(United Kingdom) James Jakes R	15	25	15	15	DNQ	25	28	15	25	18	18	23	18	19	27	13	21	C	189
23	(France) Sébastien Bourdais	DNS	11	27	26						6	6	9		6	28	6			188
24	(United Kingdom) Justin Wilson	10	19	22	7	16^{20}	17	21	10	12	15	5	Wth							183
25	(Colombia) Sebastián Saavedra R	13	26	14	11	DNQ	28	29	23	20	25	16	27	15	14	13			C	178
26	(United States) Ed Carpenter					11^{8}	18	16	16	11			22	11	25	20		1	C	175
27	(United Kingdom) Alex Lloyd					19^{31}	14	24	22	13				13				26	C	85
28	(United Kingdom) Dan Wheldon					1^{6}												14	C^{†}	75
29	(Canada) Paul Tracy			16		25^{25}	12	13			16	26							C	68
30	(Brazil) Raphael Matos	7	20	11	25	DNQ														67
31	(France) Simon Pagenaud R		8										13		15					56
32	(South Africa) Tomas Scheckter					8^{22}								23		22			C	52
33	(United Kingdom) Martin Plowman R												18		12	11				49
34	(United States) Buddy Rice					18^{7}												9	C	42
35	(United States) Townsend Bell					26^{4}												11	C	40
36	(Italy) Giorgio Pantano R														17	26	16			37
37	(New Zealand) Wade Cunningham R						29	26										7	C	36
38	(United Kingdom) Pippa Mann R					20^{32}								Wth				22	C	32
39	(Belgium) Bertrand Baguette					7^{14}														30
40	(United Kingdom) Jay Howard					30^{21}	15	20											C	27
41	(United States) Davey Hamilton					24^{15}	27	25											C	26
42	(United States) John Andretti					22^{17}														16
43	(Japan) Hideki Mutoh																18			12
44	(Brazil) João Paulo de Oliveira																26			10
45	(China) Ho-Pin Tung R					DNQ									27					10
46	(United Kingdom) Dillon Battistini R																	28		10
47	(Brazil) Bruno Junqueira					Wth^{19}														4
—	(Canada) Patrick Carpentier					DNQ														0
—	(United States) Scott Speed R					Wth														0
Pos	Driver	STP	BAR	LBH	SAO	INDY	R1	R2	MIL	IOW	TOR	EDM	MOH	NHS	SON	BAL	MOT	KEN	LVS^{1}	Pts
Pos	Driver	STP	BAR	LBH	SAO	INDY	TMS		MIL	IOW	TOR	EDM	MOH	NHS	SON	BAL	MOT	KEN	LVS^{1}	Pts

Color	Result
Gold	Winner
Silver	2nd place
Bronze	3rd place
Green	4th & 5th place
Light Blue	6th–10th place
Dark Blue	Finished (Outside Top 10)
Purple	Did not finish
Red	Did not qualify (DNQ)
Brown	Withdrawn (Wth)
Black	Disqualified (DSQ)
White	Did Not Start (DNS)
White	Race cancelled or abandoned (C)
Blank	Did not participate

**In-line notation**
**Bold**	Pole position (1 point; except Indy and Texas Rnd. 2).
Italics	Ran fastest race lap
*	Led most race laps (2 points)
DNS	Any driver who qualifies but does not start (DNS), earns half the points had they taken part.
^{1–33}	Indy 500 qualifying results, with points as follows: 15 points for 1st 13 points for 2nd and so on down to 3 points for 25th to 33rd.
^{d}	Grid set by draw no bonus point awarded
^{†}	Fatal accident
RY Rookie of the Year
R Rookie

Notes

^{NQ} After qualifying for the Indianapolis 500 had concluded, Bruno Junqueira was replaced by Ryan Hunter-Reay, who did not qualify for the 500. Junqueira received full qualifying points for a 19th place qualification.
^{1} At the Las Vegas Indy 300, Dan Wheldon died from injuries sustained in a 15-car crash on lap 11. The race was abandoned, the results were stricken from the record book, and the statistics did not count.
^{2} Simona de Silvestro was awarded with 5 points at Iowa as a 'non starter', but her withdrawal on medical grounds before the start of practice meant that she did not compete in any of the official sessions.

=== Entrant standings ===
- Based on the entrant, used for oval qualifications order, and starting grids when qualifying is cancelled
- Only full-time entrants, and at-large part-time entrants shown.

Pos	Driver	STP	BAR	LBH	SAO	INDY	TMS		MIL	IOW	TOR	EDM	MOH	NHS	SON	BAL	MOT	KEN	LVS^{1}	Pts
Pos	Driver	STP	BAR	LBH	SAO	INDY	R1	R2	MIL	IOW	TOR	EDM	MOH	NHS	SON	BAL	MOT	KEN	LVS^{1}	Pts
1	#10 Chip Ganassi Racing	1*	3	3	4	12^{9}	1*	7	**1***	5*	1	3	2	**20***	4	4	8	2*	C	573
2	#12 Team Penske	**2**	**1***	**10**	**1***	14^{5}	3	1*	4	21	**24***	1*	14	5	**1***	**1***	2	**19**	C	555
3	#9 Chip Ganassi Racing	16	2	18	12	5*^{2}	2	2	7	3	2	23	**1***	3	5	5	**1***	3	C	518
4	#2 Newman/Haas Racing	9	5	6	5	6^{3}	21	15	3	14	12	22	8	2	11	2	5	6	C	425
5	#82 KV Racing Technology	3	6	8	22	4^{23}	11	**5**^{d}	19	2	26	4	5	22	28	3	17	17	**C**	366
6	#6 Team Penske	18	21	2*	3	27^{27}	6	3	11	6	7	10	16	8	3	14	20	8	C	364
7	#26 Andretti Autosport	24	4	26	14	9^{28}	13	6	13	1	4	14	7	24	24	25	3	27	C	337
8	#28 Andretti Autosport	21	14	23	18	DNQ	19	9	26	8	3	7	3	1	10	8	24	5	C	335
9	#38 Chip Ganassi Racing	17	18	13	2	3^{30}	9	30	2	15	13	25	24	26	8	10	12	12	C	320
10	#7 Andretti Autosport	12	17	7	23	10^{26}	16	8	5	10	19	9	21	6	21	6	11	10	C	314
11	#3 Team Penske	20	7	12	21	17^{16}	10	4	9	7	17	2	19	17	2	17	22	29	C	312
12	#77 Sam Schmidt Motorsports	6	15	5	19	**28**^{1}	**4**	14	18	16	23	17	6	19	20	7	4	14	C^{†}	312
13	#06 Newman/Haas Racing		24	4	9	29^{13}	20	19	6	9	14	15	20	4	7	24	15	4	C	302
14	#5 KV Racing Technology	5	16	21	8	33^{10}	5	12	8	**19**	20	**21**	4	7	18	18	10	15	C	297
15	#4 Panther Racing	11	13	17	10	2^{12}	23	18	21	4	8	11	25	21	23	19	7	20	C	296
16	#14 A. J. Foyt Enterprises	8	12	9	17	15^{11}	8	11	24	18	5	12	10	10	22	9	25	16	C	287
17	#19 Dale Coyne Racing	DNS	11	27	26	19^{31}	14	24	22	13	6	6	9	13	6	28	6	26	C	273
18	#22 Dreyer & Reinbold Racing	10	19	22	7	16^{20}	17	21	10	12	15	5	13	23	17	26	16	11	C	268
19	#27 Andretti Autosport	23	22	1	6	DNQ	24	17	12	24	22	8	26	25	16	23	9	18	C	260
20	#59 KV Racing Technology	19	23	25	13	32^{18}	7	10	20	17	9	20	15	12	9	15	21	23	C	241
21	#78 HVM Racing	4	9	20	20	31^{24}	26	27	25	DNP^{2}	10	24	12	16	15	12	14	25	C	240
22	#24 Dreyer & Reinbold Racing	14	8	19	24	21^{33}	22	22	17	23	11	13	17	14	13	16	19	24	C	236
23	#83 Chip Ganassi Racing	22	10	24	16	13^{29}	30	23	14	22	21	19	11	9	26	21	23	13	C	233
24	#34 Conquest Racing	13	26	14	11	DNQ	28	29	23	20	25	16	27	15	14	13	26	28	C	198
25	#18 Dale Coyne Racing	15	25	15	15	DNQ	25	28	15	25	18	18	23	18	19	27	13	21	C	189
26	#67 Sarah Fisher Racing					11^{8}	18	16	16	11			22	11	25	20		1	C	175
27	#17 AFS / Sam Schmidt Motorsports	7	20	11	25	DNQ							18		12	11	18	7	C	154
Pos	Driver	STP	BAR	LBH	SAO	INDY	R1	R2	MIL	IOW	TOR	EDM	MOH	NHS	SON	BAL	MOT	KEN	LVS^{1}	Pts
Pos	Driver	STP	BAR	LBH	SAO	INDY	TMS		MIL	IOW	TOR	EDM	MOH	NHS	SON	BAL	MOT	KEN	LVS^{1}	Pts

== See also ==
- 2011 Indianapolis 500
