= 2011 São Paulo Indy 300 =

(Brazil) 2011 Streets of São Paulo
Race details
- 4th round of the 2011 IndyCar Series season
- Date: May 1, 2011
- Official name: Itaipava São Paulo Indy 300 presented by Nestlé
- Location: Santana – São Paulo city
- Course: Temporary street circuit 2.536 mi / 4.081 km
- Distance: 55 laps 139.480 mi / 224.471 km
- Scheduled Distance: 75 laps 190.200 mi / 306.097 km

Pole position
- Driver: (Australia) Will Power (Team Penske)
- Time: 1:21.8958

Fastest lap
- Driver: (Switzerland) Simona de Silvestro (HVM Racing)
- Time: 1:39.8231 (on lap 36 of 55)

Podium
- First: (Australia) Will Power (Team Penske)
- Second: (United States) Graham Rahal (Chip Ganassi Racing)
- Third: (Australia) Ryan Briscoe (Team Penske)

The Itaipava São Paulo Indy 300 presented by Nestlé was the fourth race of the 2011 IZOD IndyCar Series season. The race took place on May 1 and 2, on the 2.536-mile (4.081 km) temporary street circuit in São Paulo, Brazil, and was telecasted by Versus in the United States and TV Bandeirantes in Brazil. After a rain delay that lasted almost two and a half hours, attempts to run the event in full on the Sunday were scrapped with the race completed on Monday May 2.

== Classification ==
=== Qualifying ===
- All cars were split into two groups of twelve, with the fastest six from each group going through to the "top 12" session. In this session, the fastest six cars progressed to the "Firestone Fast Six." The fastest driver in the final session claimed pole, with the rest of the cars lining up in session order, regardless of qualifying times. (fast six from 1–6, top 12 from 7–12 and round 1 from 13 to 24, with group 1 drivers occupying the odd–numbered grid positions, and group 2 drivers occupying the even–numbered grid positions.

Pos	No.	Driver	Team	Group 1	Group 2	Top 12	Fast 6
1	12	(Australia) Will Power	Team Penske		1:22.2329	1:22.0675	1:21.8958
2	28	(United States) Ryan Hunter–Reay	Andretti Autosport	1:23.3280		1:22.3374	1:22.2975
3	9	(New Zealand) Scott Dixon	Chip Ganassi Racing		1:22.5791	1:22.3611	1:22.3620
4	6	(Australia) Ryan Briscoe	Team Penske		1:22.7224	1:22.3028	1:22.3937
5	38	(United States) Graham Rahal	Chip Ganassi Racing	1:23.1280		1:22.3886	1:22.4970
6	10	(United Kingdom) Dario Franchitti	Chip Ganassi Racing		1:22.7716	1:22.2273	1:22.6103
7	3	(Brazil) Hélio Castroneves	Team Penske	1:23.1988		1:22.6283	
8	22	(United Kingdom) Justin Wilson	Dreyer & Reinbold Racing		1:23.2549	1:22.6471	
9	27	(United Kingdom) Mike Conway	Andretti Autosport		1:22.7828	1:22.6986	
10	5	(Japan) Takuma Sato	KV Racing Technology – Lotus	1:23.4955		1:22.7379	
11	06	(Canada) James Hinchcliffe (R)	Newman/Haas Racing	1:23.4911		1:22.8450	
12	19	(France) Sébastien Bourdais	Dale Coyne Racing	1:23.4266		1:22.9084	
13	78	(Switzerland) Simona de Silvestro	HVM Racing	1:23.6807			
14	14	(Brazil) Vítor Meira	A. J. Foyt Enterprises		1:23.3196		
15	26	(United States) Marco Andretti	Andretti Autosport	1:23.7682			
16	2	(Spain) Oriol Servià	Newman/Haas Racing		1:23.4015		
17	7	(United States) Danica Patrick	Andretti Autosport	1:24.0967			
18	83	(United States) Charlie Kimball (R)	Chip Ganassi Racing		1:23.7126		
19	17	(Brazil) Raphael Matos	AFS Racing	1:24.1890			
20	77	(Canada) Alex Tagliani	Sam Schmidt Motorsports		1:23.7801		
21	82	(Brazil) Tony Kanaan	KV Racing Technology - Lotus	1:24.2205			
22	4	(United States) J. R. Hildebrand (R)	Panther Racing		1:23.8443		
23	34	(Colombia) Sebastián Saavedra (R)	Conquest Racing	1:24.2963			
24	18	(United Kingdom) James Jakes (R)	Dale Coyne Racing		1:23.8492		
25	24	(Brazil) Ana Beatriz (R)	Dreyer & Reinbold Racing	1:24.8246			
26	59	(Venezuela) E. J. Viso	KV Racing Technology - Lotus		No Time		

=== Race ===
Pos	No.	Driver	Team	Laps	Time/Retired	Grid	Laps Led	Points
1	12	(Australia) Will Power	Team Penske	55	2:04:05.2964	1	32	53
2	38	(United States) Graham Rahal	Chip Ganassi Racing	55	+ 4.6723	5	0	40
3	6	(Australia) Ryan Briscoe	Team Penske	55	+ 7.9037	4	0	35
4	10	(United Kingdom) Dario Franchitti	Chip Ganassi Racing	55	+ 10.1470	6	0	32
5	2	(Spain) Oriol Servià	Newman/Haas Racing	55	+ 15.8188	16	0	30
6	27	(United Kingdom) Mike Conway	Andretti Autosport	55	+ 16.6775	9	0	28
7	22	(United Kingdom) Justin Wilson	Dreyer & Reinbold Racing	55	+ 20.0131	8	0	26
8	5	(Japan) Takuma Sato	KV Racing Technology – Lotus	55	+ 23.0683	10	23	24
9	06	(Canada) James Hinchcliffe (R)	Newman/Haas Racing	55	+ 25.2924	11	0	22
10	4	(United States) J. R. Hildebrand (R)	Panther Racing	55	+ 31.3172	22	0	20
11	34	(Colombia) Sebastián Saavedra (R)	Conquest Racing	55	+ 36.4261	23	0	19
12	9	(New Zealand) Scott Dixon	Chip Ganassi Racing	55	+ 42.1974	3	0	18
13	59	(Venezuela) E. J. Viso	KV Racing Technology - Lotus	55	+ 45.8266	26	0	17
14	26	(United States) Marco Andretti	Andretti Autosport	55	+ 1:14.5634	15	0	16
15	18	(United Kingdom) James Jakes (R)	Dale Coyne Racing	55	+ 1:16.2783	24	0	15
16	83	(United States) Charlie Kimball (R)	Chip Ganassi Racing	54	+ 1 Lap	18	0	14
17	14	(Brazil) Vítor Meira	A. J. Foyt Enterprises	53	+ 2 Laps	14	0	13
18	28	(United States) Ryan Hunter-Reay	Andretti Autosport	50	+ 5 Laps	2	0	12
19	77	(Canada) Alex Tagliani	Sam Schmidt Motorsports	48	+ 7 Laps	20	0	12
20	78	(Switzerland) Simona de Silvestro	HVM Racing	46	+ 9 Laps	13	0	12
21	3	(Brazil) Hélio Castroneves	Team Penske	46	+ 9 Laps	7	0	12
22	82	(Brazil) Tony Kanaan	KV Racing Technology - Lotus	46	+ 9 Laps	21	0	12
23	7	(United States) Danica Patrick	Andretti Autosport	46	+ 9 Laps	17	0	12
24	24	(Brazil) Ana Beatriz (R)	Dreyer & Reinbold Racing	31	Mechanical	25	0	12
25	17	(Brazil) Raphael Matos	AFS Racing	28	Contact	19	0	10
26	19	(France) Sébastien Bourdais	Dale Coyne Racing	20	Contact	12	0	10
OFFICIAL RACE REPORT

NOTE: Under agreement from race organisers, INDYCAR, and Brazilian television rights holder Rede Bandeirantes, there is a two-hour time limit for this race. The first 14 laps from Sunday took 40:46 to run, and that time was deducted from Monday morning's race. The Monday race featured a 1:19:14 timed race (the remaining time from Sunday's race limit).

== Championship standings after the race ==
Drivers' Championship standings

Pos	Driver	Points
1	(Australia) Will Power	168
2	(United Kingdom) Dario Franchitti	154
3	(Spain) Oriol Servià	110
4	(United Kingdom) Mike Conway	102
5	(Australia) Ryan Briscoe	101

- Note: Only the top five positions are included.

Previous race: 2011 Toyota Grand Prix of Long Beach	IndyCar Series; 2011 season	Next race: 2011 Indianapolis 500
Previous race: 2010 São Paulo Indy 300	São Paulo Indy 300	Next race: 2012 São Paulo Indy 300
