= 2011 Baltimore Grand Prix (IndyCar) =

(United States) 2011 Baltimore Grand Prix
Race details
- 15th round of the 2011 IndyCar Series season
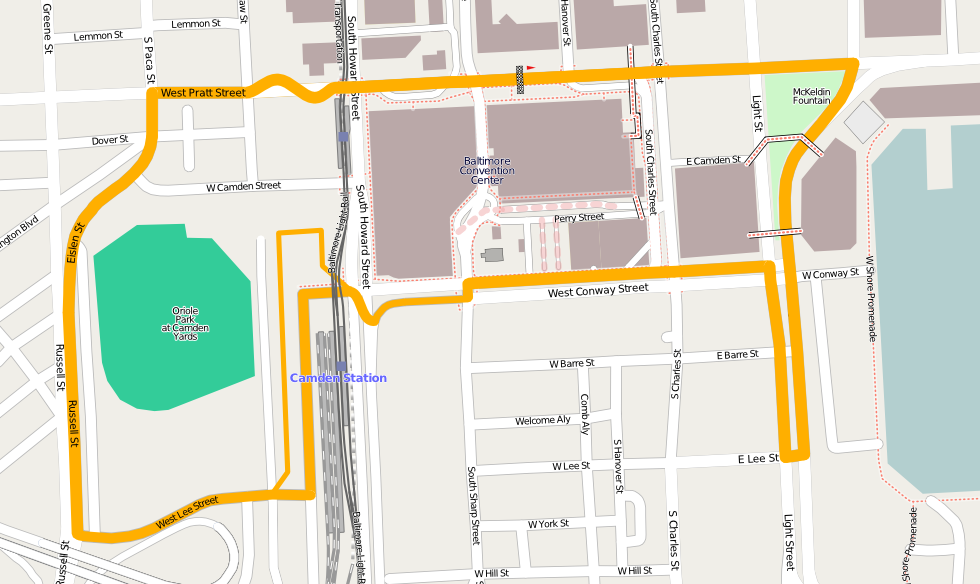
- Date: September 4, 2011
- Official name: Grand Prix of Baltimore
- Location: Streets of Baltimore
- Course: Temporary street circuit 2.040 mi / 3.283 km
- Distance: 75 laps 153.000 mi / 246.230 km
- Weather: 85 °F (29 °C), scattered clouds

Pole position
- Driver: (Australia) Will Power (Team Penske)
- Time: 01:20.2447

Fastest lap
- Driver: (Australia) Will Power (Team Penske)
- Time: 01:21.5992 (on lap 9 of 75)

Podium
- First: (Australia) Will Power (Team Penske)
- Second: (Spain) Oriol Servià (Newman/Haas Racing)
- Third: (Brazil) Tony Kanaan (KV Racing Technology)

The 2011 Baltimore Grand Prix was the first running of the Baltimore Grand Prix and the fifteenth round of the 2011 IndyCar Series season. It took place on Sunday, September 4, 2011. The race contested over 75 laps at the 2.040-mile (3.283 km) Inner Harbor temporary street circuit in Baltimore, Maryland.

The race had originally been scheduled to take place on the first weekend of August, but was moved to Labor Day weekend to allow for better logistical and fan opportunities.

Will Power led 70 of 75 laps, on his way to score his last win of 2011. He shared the podium with Oriol Servià and Tony Kanaan, who finished third, after having started 27th.

It was the last race victory for Penske-Honda partnership in the series, as Penske switched to running the Chevrolet engine in 2012.

== Results ==
=== Race ===
Pos	No.	Driver	Team	Laps	Time/Retired	Grid	Laps Led	Points^{1}
1	12	(Australia) Will Power	Team Penske	75	2:02:19.4998	1	70	53
2	2	(Spain) Oriol Servià	Newman/Haas Racing	75	+ 10.2096	14	0	40
3	82	(Brazil) Tony Kanaan	KV Racing Technology – Lotus	75	+ 10.8557	27	0	35
4	10	(United Kingdom) Dario Franchitti	Chip Ganassi Racing	75	+ 11.0831	4	2	32
5	9	(New Zealand) Scott Dixon	Chip Ganassi Racing	75	+ 11.5032	9	0	30
6	7	(United States) Danica Patrick	Andretti Autosport	75	+ 18.5661	23	0	28
7	77	(Canada) Alex Tagliani	Sam Schmidt Motorsports	75	+ 18.5671	19	0	26
8	28	(United States) Ryan Hunter-Reay	Andretti Autosport	75	+ 18.9269	6	1	24
9	14	(Brazil) Vítor Meira	A. J. Foyt Enterprises	75	+ 22.3096	12	0	22
10	38	(United States) Graham Rahal	Chip Ganassi Racing	75	+ 22.6977	2	0	20
11	17	(United Kingdom) Martin Plowman	AFS Racing	75	+ 23.7405	18	0	19
12	78	(Switzerland) Simona de Silvestro	HVM Racing	75	+ 24.7568	10	1	18
13	34	(Colombia) Sebastián Saavedra (R)	Conquest Racing	75	+ 29.6042	24	0	17
14	6	(Australia) Ryan Briscoe	Team Penske	75	+ 30.9855	3	1	16
15	59	(Venezuela) E. J. Viso	KV Racing Technology – Lotus	75	+ 50.6756	8	0	15
16	24	(Brazil) Ana Beatriz (R)	Dreyer & Reinbold Racing	75	+ 1:00.5667	20	0	14
17	3	(Brazil) Hélio Castroneves	Team Penske	74	+ 1 lap	28	0	13
18	5	(Japan) Takuma Sato	KV Racing Technology – Lotus	73	+ 2 laps	26	0	12
19	4	(United States) J. R. Hildebrand (R)	Panther Racing	73	Contact	17	0	12
20	67	(United States) Ed Carpenter	Sarah Fisher Racing	73	+ 2 laps	25	0	12
21	83	(United States) Charlie Kimball (R)	Chip Ganassi Racing	73	+ 2 laps	16	0	12
22	07	(South Africa) Tomas Scheckter	SH Racing	71	+ 4 laps	22	0	12
23	27	(United Kingdom) Mike Conway	Andretti Autosport	64	Mechanical	7	0	12
24	06	(Canada) James Hinchcliffe (R)	Newman/Haas Racing	54	Handling	15	0	12
25	26	(United States) Marco Andretti	Andretti Autosport	40	Mechanical	21	0	10
26	22	(Italy) Giorgio Pantano	Dreyer & Reinbold Racing	39	Contact	13	0	10
27	18	(United Kingdom) James Jakes (R)	Dale Coyne Racing	37	Contact	11	0	10
28	19	(France) Sébastien Bourdais	Dale Coyne Racing	9	Electrical	5	0	10

Notes

^1 Points include 1 point for pole position and 2 points for most laps led.
