= 2011 Honda Indy 200 =

(United States) 2011 Honda Indy 200
Race details
- 12th round of the 2011 IndyCar Series season
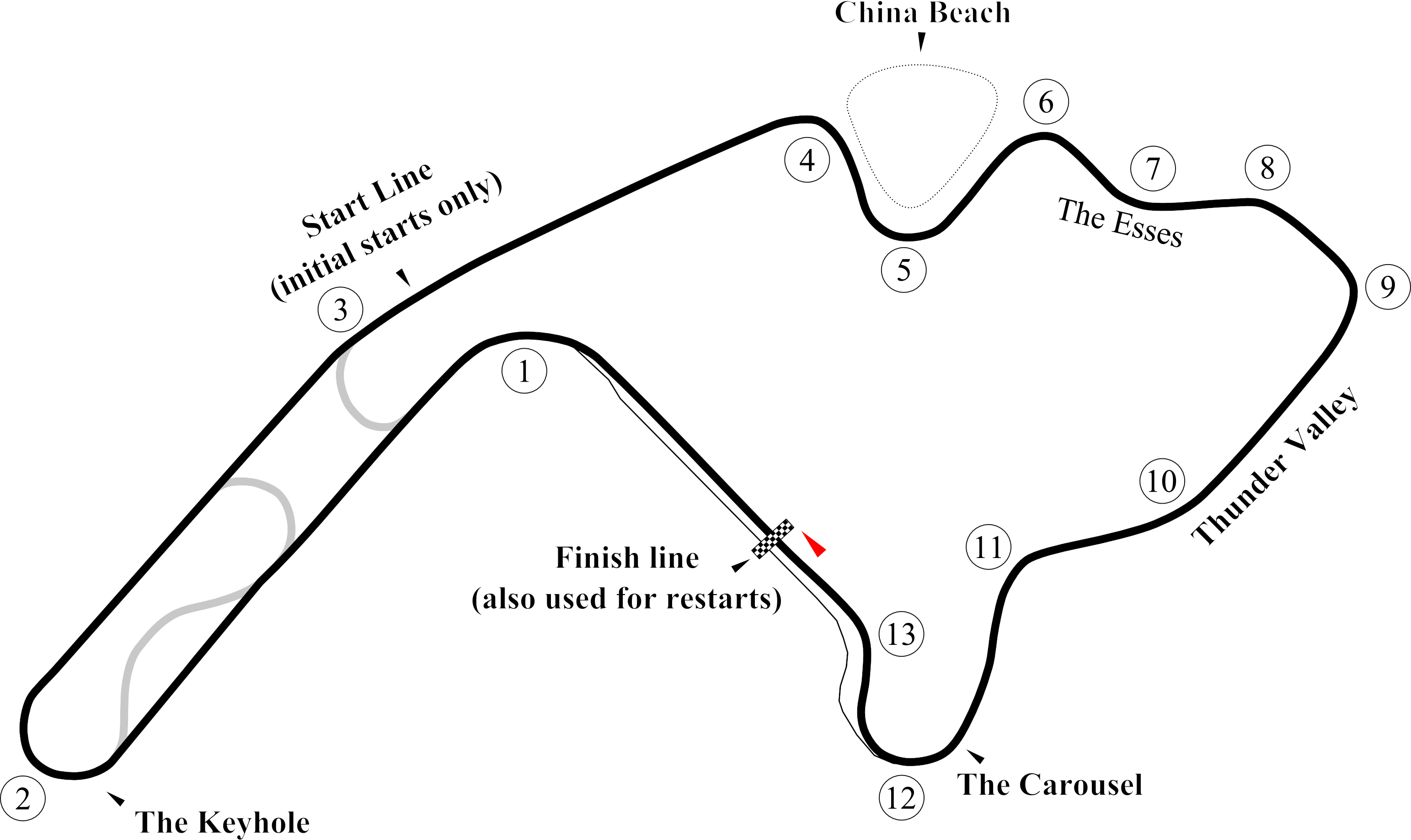
- Date: August 7, 2011
- Official name: Honda 200
- Location: Mid-Ohio Sports Car Course
- Course: Permanent racing facility 2.258 mi / 3.634 km
- Distance: 85 laps 191.930 mi / 308.881 km
- Weather: 87 °F (31 °C), partly cloudy

Pole position
- Driver: (New Zealand) Scott Dixon (Chip Ganassi Racing)
- Time: 1:08.0776

Fastest lap
- Driver: (New Zealand) Scott Dixon (Chip Ganassi Racing)
- Time: 1:09.1271 (on lap 76 of 85)

Podium
- First: (New Zealand) Scott Dixon (Chip Ganassi Racing)
- Second: (United Kingdom) Dario Franchitti (Chip Ganassi Racing)
- Third: (United States) Ryan Hunter-Reay (Andretti Autosport)

The 2011 Honda Indy 200 presented by Westfield Insurance was the fifth running of the Honda 200 and the twelfth round of the 2011 IndyCar Series season. It took place on Sunday, August 7, 2011. The race contested over 85 laps at the 2.258-mile (3.634 km) Mid-Ohio Sports Car Course in Lexington, Ohio. The race was won by Scott Dixon.
