= 2011 Indy Japan: The Final =

Race details
- 16th round of the 2011 IndyCar Series season
- Date: September 18, 2011
- Official name: Indy Japan: The Final
- Location: Twin Ring Motegi
- Course: Permanent racing facility 2.983 mi / 4.801 km
- Distance: 63 laps 187.929 mi / 302.442 km
- Weather: 88 °F (31 °C), scattered clouds

Pole position
- Driver: (New Zealand) Scott Dixon (Chip Ganassi Racing)
- Time: 01:38.3918

Fastest lap
- Driver: (Italy) Giorgio Pantano (Dreyer & Reinbold)
- Time: 1:40.2453 (on lap 5 of 63)

Podium
- First: (New Zealand) Scott Dixon (Chip Ganassi Racing)
- Second: (Australia) Will Power (Team Penske)
- Third: (United States) Marco Andretti (Andretti Autosport)

The 2011 Indy Japan: The Final was the ninth and final running of the Indy Japan 300 and the sixteenth round of the 2011 IndyCar Series season. It took place on Sunday September 18, 2011. The race was contested over 63 laps at the 2.983-mile (4.801 km) Twin Ring Motegi road course in Motegi, Tochigi, Japan. This event was to be contested on the 1.520-mile (2.446 km) oval but due to the damage which was brought to the oval during the Tōhoku earthquake and tsunami, six months earlier, the series decided to replace the event from the damaged oval to the still intact road course. It was the first and final Indycar race to be run on the road course, the last Indycar race to be held at Twin Ring Motegi, and the last Indycar race to be held in Japan. The race was won by Scott Dixon.

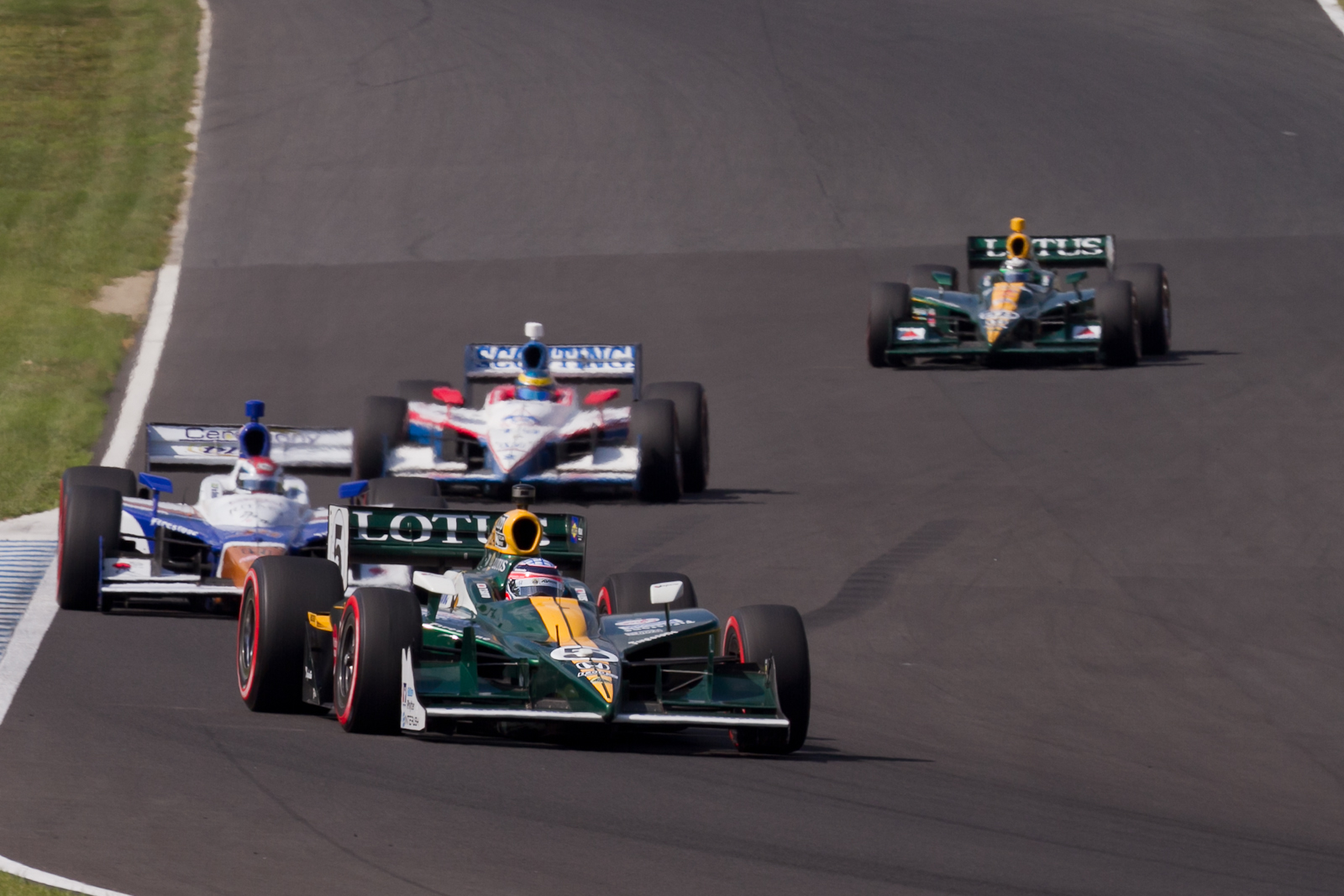
Takuma Sato at the 2011 Indy Japan 300
