= 2011 Honda Indy Toronto =

(Canada) 2011 Honda Indy Toronto
Race details
- 9th round of the 2011 IndyCar Series season
- Date: July 10, 2011
- Official name: Honda Indy Toronto
- Location: Streets of Toronto
- Course: Temporary street circuit 1.755 mi / 2.824 km
- Distance: 85 laps 149.175 mi / 240.074 km
- Weather: Temperatures reaching up to 30 °C (86 °F); with temperatures dropping slightly to 24.8 °C (76.6 °F) by the end of the event

Pole position
- Driver: (Australia) Will Power (Team Penske)
- Time: 59.5771

Fastest lap
- Driver: (United Kingdom) Justin Wilson (Dreyer & Reinbold Racing)
- Time: 1:00.6386 (on lap 83 of 85)

Podium
- First: (United Kingdom) Dario Franchitti (Chip Ganassi Racing)
- Second: (New Zealand) Scott Dixon (Chip Ganassi Racing)
- Third: (United States) Ryan Hunter-Reay (Andretti Autosport)

The 2011 Honda Indy Toronto was the ninth round of the 2011 IndyCar Series season and took place on July 10, 2011, at the 1.755-mile (2.824 km) Exhibition Place temporary street circuit in Toronto, Ontario, Canada. Dario Franchitti won the race, second was his teammate Scott Dixon, and Ryan Hunter-Reay came in third. Will Power took the 3 bonus points for winning pole and leading the most laps, but finished 24th after contact with championship rival Franchitti and Alex Tagliani.

== Classification ==
=== Qualifying ===
- All cars were split into two groups of twelve, with the fastest six from each group going through to the "top 12" session. In this session, the fastest six cars progressed to the "Firestone Fast Six." The fastest driver in the final session claimed pole, with the rest of the cars lining up in session order, regardless of qualifying times. (fast six from 1–6, top 12 from 7–12 and round 1 from 13 to 24, with group 1 drivers occupying the odd-numbered grid positions, and group 2 drivers occupying the even-numbered grid positions.

Pos	No.	Driver	Team	Group 1	Group 2	Top 12	Fast 6
1	12	(Australia) Will Power	Team Penske		59.3535	59.4191	59.5771
2	9	(New Zealand) Scott Dixon	Chip Ganassi Racing	59.3859		59.3779	59.6646
3	10	(United Kingdom) Dario Franchitti	Chip Ganassi Racing		59.6454	59.5997	59.9000
4	27	(United Kingdom) Mike Conway	Andretti Autosport	59.6286		59.4130	59.9326
5	38	(United States) Graham Rahal	Chip Ganassi Racing		59.7652	59.6519	1:00.0463
6	2	(Spain) Oriol Servià	Newman/Haas Racing		59.8327	59.6704	1:00.3341
7	19	(France) Sébastien Bourdais	Dale Coyne Racing		59.8988	59.8239	
8	28	(United States) Ryan Hunter-Reay	Andretti Autosport	59.4830		59.8715	
9	77	(Canada) Alex Tagliani	Sam Schmidt Motorsports	59.8096		59.8901	
10	6	(Australia) Ryan Briscoe	Team Penske	59.5159		59.9020	
11	22	(United Kingdom) Justin Wilson	Dreyer & Reinbold Racing	59.5196		59.9636	
12	3	(Brazil) Hélio Castroneves	Team Penske		59.7769	1:00.0115	
13	06	(Canada) James Hinchcliffe	Newman/Haas Racing	59.8346			
14	14	(Brazil) Vítor Meira	A. J. Foyt Enterprises		59.9869		
15	34	(Colombia) Sebastián Saavedra (R)	Conquest Racing	59.9389			
16	82	(Brazil) Tony Kanaan	KV Racing Technology – Lotus		1:00.0149		
17	78	(Switzerland) Simona de Silvestro	HVM Racing	1:00.0806			
18	59	(Venezuela) E. J. Viso	KV Racing Technology – Lotus		1:00.1191		
19	5	(Japan) Takuma Sato	KV Racing Technology – Lotus	1:00.1003			
20	26	(United States) Marco Andretti	Andretti Autosport		1:00.1542		
21	7	(United States) Danica Patrick	Andretti Autosport	1:00.3438			
22	4	(United States) J. R. Hildebrand (R)	Panther Racing		1:00.4472		
23	18	(United Kingdom) James Jakes (R)	Dale Coyne Racing	1:00.6226			
24	8	(Canada) Paul Tracy	Dragon Racing		1:00.4524		
25	83	(United States) Charlie Kimball (R)	Chip Ganassi Racing	1:00.6463			
26	24	(Brazil) Ana Beatriz (R)	Dreyer & Reinbold Racing		1:00.7917		

=== Race ===
Pos	No.	Driver	Team	Laps	Time/Retired	Grid	Laps Led	Points
1	10	(United Kingdom) Dario Franchitti	Chip Ganassi Racing	85	1:56:32.1501	3	30	50
2	9	(New Zealand) Scott Dixon	Chip Ganassi Racing	85	+ 0.7345	2	0	40
3	28	(United States) Ryan Hunter-Reay	Andretti Autosport	85	+ 6.0144	8	0	35
4	26	(United States) Marco Andretti	Andretti Autosport	85	+ 7.5671	20	0	32
5	14	(Brazil) Vítor Meira	A. J. Foyt Enterprises	85	+ 9.0117	14	0	30
6	19	(France) Sébastien Bourdais	Dale Coyne Racing	85	+ 9.3114	7	0	28
7	6	(Australia) Ryan Briscoe	Team Penske	85	+ 9.8735	10	0	26
8	4	(United States) J. R. Hildebrand (R)	Panther Racing	85	+ 14.1750	22	0	24
9	59	(Venezuela) E. J. Viso	KV Racing Technology – Lotus	85	+ 14.7843	18	0	22
10	78	(Switzerland) Simona de Silvestro	HVM Racing	85	+ 15.7603	17	0	20
11	24	(Brazil) Ana Beatriz (R)	Dreyer & Reinbold Racing	85	+ 16.8992	26	0	19
12	2	(Spain) Oriol Servià	Newman/Haas Racing	85	+ 19.8736	6	0	18
13	38	(United States) Graham Rahal	Chip Ganassi Racing	85	+ 21.3123	5	23	17
14	06	(Canada) James Hinchcliffe (R)	Newman/Haas Racing	84	+ 1 lap	13	0	16
15	22	(United Kingdom) Justin Wilson	Dreyer & Reinbold Racing	83	+ 2 laps	11	0	15
16	8	(Canada) Paul Tracy	Dragon Racing	82	+ 3 laps	24	0	14
17	3	(Brazil) Hélio Castroneves	Team Penske	81	+ 4 Laps	12	0	13
18	18	(United Kingdom) James Jakes (R)	Dale Coyne Racing	81	+ 4 Laps	23	0	12
19	7	(United States) Danica Patrick	Andretti Autosport	79	+ 6 laps	21	0	12
20	5	(Japan) Takuma Sato	KV Racing Technology – Lotus	79	+ 6 laps	19	0	12
21	83	(United States) Charlie Kimball (R)	Chip Ganassi Racing	77	Contact	25	0	12
22	27	(United Kingdom) Mike Conway	Andretti Autosport	76	Contact	4	0	12
23	77	(Canada) Alex Tagliani	Sam Schmidt Motorsports	71	Contact	9	0	12
24	12	(Australia) Will Power	Team Penske	66	Contact	1	32	15
25	34	(Colombia) Sebastián Saavedra (R)	Conquest Racing	43	Contact	15	0	10
26	82	(Brazil) Tony Kanaan	KV Racing Technology – Lotus	2	Contact	16	0	10

== Race summary ==
Early in the race controversy brewed on lap 57 when Dario Franchitti appeared to have intentionally collided into championship contender Will Power. Power spun out and was later hit by Alex Tagliani. Power wrecked enough that he was taken out of the race. In an interview Power called Franchitti "a dirty driver who mouths off about everybody." and was also critical of Tagliani calling him a "wanker."

A few moments following the wreck, the broadcasters announced that Franchitti was being issued a stop-and-go penalty for dirty driving & avoidable contact. However, it was later reported that the penalty was rescinded, outraging many fellow competitors and fans.

Meanwhile, Alex Tagliani was launched into the air and out of the race by Danica Patrick on the 72nd lap, while a close battle between Toronto natives James Hinchcliffe and Paul Tracy resulted in a flat tire for Hinchcliffe and a damaged front wing for Tracy.

Tracy's hopes for a hometown victory were wiped out after he bumped into Meira on the 45th lap, dropping the 42-year-old fan favorite three laps out of the pack to a 16th-place finish. James Hinchcliffe, meanwhile, finished 14th after being involved in a five-car collision when Andretti turned into Oriol Servia, resulting in a pileup that banged up Hinchcliffe, Servia and Charlie Kimball, and ended Mike Conway's day.

Patrick started 21st and was a nonfactor after a collision with Japan's Takuma Sato punctured one of her tires. She finished 19th, but could at least say she crossed the finish line.

Brazil's Tony Kanaan wasn't so fortunate nor was he a contender to win. He made an early exit after Australia's Ryan Briscoe clipped his back wheel rounding a corner, sending the Brazilian airborne into the wall just three laps after the start. Kanaan pointed at his head and yelled at Briscoe from the side of road as the Australian passed by his wrecked car.

Franchitti, meanwhile, dominated the race following the penalty's rescinding and took the lead from Graham Rahal with 15 laps to go and went on to win the controversial race. Fans booed and littered as Franchitti did donuts and drove into victory circle. When asked if there was a penalty that was rescinded, former race-car driver - now - race control director Al Unser Jr. said "There was never a penalty for the collision. There was never a penalized issue. We saw it as a simple racing accident...guys going for the same thing with one on the good end and one on the bad end, and emotions run high."

"I think it was a racing incident at best," Franchitti said in victory lane. "I don't think I'm known throughout the paddock as a driver who races people dirty. I will say, in his defense, had that happened to me today, I would have been steamed when I got out of the car too. Particularly if I'd crashed later in the race. ... I understand his anger, but hopefully when he watches the replay on television he'll realize it was a racing incident."
