= Pippa Mann =

British racing driver

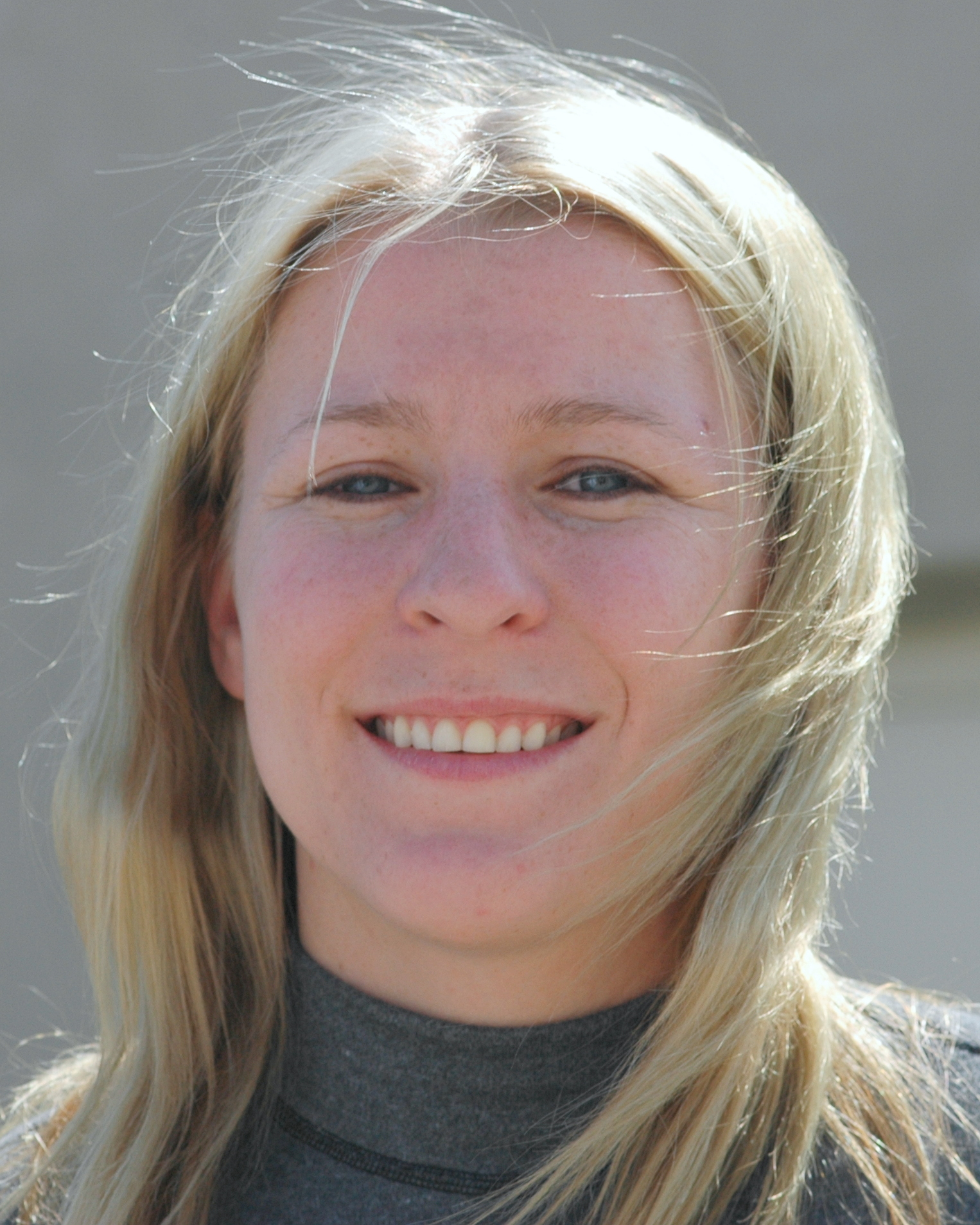
- Pippa Mann in Indianapolis, Indiana, May 2011
- Nationality: (United Kingdom) British
- Born: 11 August 1983 (age 43); London, United Kingdom

IndyCar Series career
- 15 races run over 5 years
- Team: No. 63 (Dale Coyne Racing)
- 2016 position: 29th
- Best finish: 29th (2015, 2016)
- First race: 2011 Indianapolis 500 (Indianapolis)
- Last race: 2019 Indianapolis 500 (Indianapolis)
Wins	Podiums	Poles
0	0	0

Firestone Indy Lights Series
- Categorisation: FIA Gold (until 2017); FIA Silver (2018–2026); FIA Bronze (2027–)
- Years active: 2009–2010
- Teams: Sam Schmidt Motorsports; Panther Racing
- Starts: 27
- Wins: 1
- Poles: 3
- Best finish: 5th in 2010

Previous series
- 2009–2010 2008 2007–2008 2005–2006 2005 2003–2004, 2006: Firestone Indy Lights Series; Porsche Carrera Cup GB; Formula Renault 3.5 Series; Formula Renault 2.0 Eurocup; French Formula Renault 2.0; British Formula Renault 2.0

Pippa Mann (born 11 August 1983) is a British racing car driver who currently competes in the Nürburgring Langstrecken-Serie. She has also competed in the IndyCar Series. She was born in London, United Kingdom.

== Career ==
=== Formula Renault ===
Mann began her career in 2003, after signing a three-race contract with Manor Motorsport to race in the winter series of the British Formula Renault Championship.

In 2004, Mann signed with Team JVA and completed a full season. She also competed a European Formula Renault event in Zolder.

In 2005, Mann signed a two-year contract to drive for Comtec Racing in the Formula Renault Eurocup as well as racing in that year's French Formula Renault 2.0 series. She partnered Westley Barber for the UK based team and learnt a lot during the year.

In 2006, Mann raced in the UK Formula Renault 2.0 Championship as well as the Eurocup again for race team Comtec Racing, continuing the partnership with John Barnett and Murdoch Cockburn.

In January 2007, Mann signed for Cram by P1 Europe to become the first female to race in the Formula Renault 3.5 Series. In her debut year, she managed to score a point and also start from pole position. She competed in the Formula Renault 3.5 Series in 2008 as well, still driving for P1 Motorsport team.

=== Indy Lights ===
Mann signed to drive for Panther Racing in the 2009 Indy Lights series, the development series for the IndyCar Series.

During her debut season with Panther Racing, Mann scored a string of top-15 finishes, including three top-ten results. However a decision to close the Panther Racing Indy Lights team left her without a 2010 drive.

In December 2009, after deciding to remain in Indianapolis and find a place in another team, Mann confirmed that she would be joining Sam Schmidt Motorsports for the 2010 Indy Lights series. In 2010, she became the first female pole sitter for a race at the Indianapolis Motor Speedway by heading the grid for the Indy Lights Freedom 100, and won her first race at Kentucky Speedway.

=== IndyCar Series ===
On 1 March 2011, Mann tested for the Indianapolis-based IndyCar Series team Conquest Racing at Texas Motor Speedway, and on 19 April, she announced that she would be piloting the No. 36 entry for Conquest Racing in the 2011 Indianapolis 500. On Sunday, 22 May, (Bump Day) Mann qualified 32nd for the 2011 Indianapolis 500, becoming the first British woman ever to qualify for the 500-mile race. During the race, she moved up 12 positions to finish in 20th place, despite a mechanical problem with her on-board water supply that left her severely dehydrated by the end of the race. She was sponsored in the race by Armando Montelongo, former star of the television show Flip This House.

On 13 August 2011, during the final day of practice for the MoveThatBlock.com Indy 225 at New Hampshire Motor Speedway, Mann crashed and suffered an end-plate fracture of the C7 vertebra, but competed on 2 October in the Kentucky Indy 300.

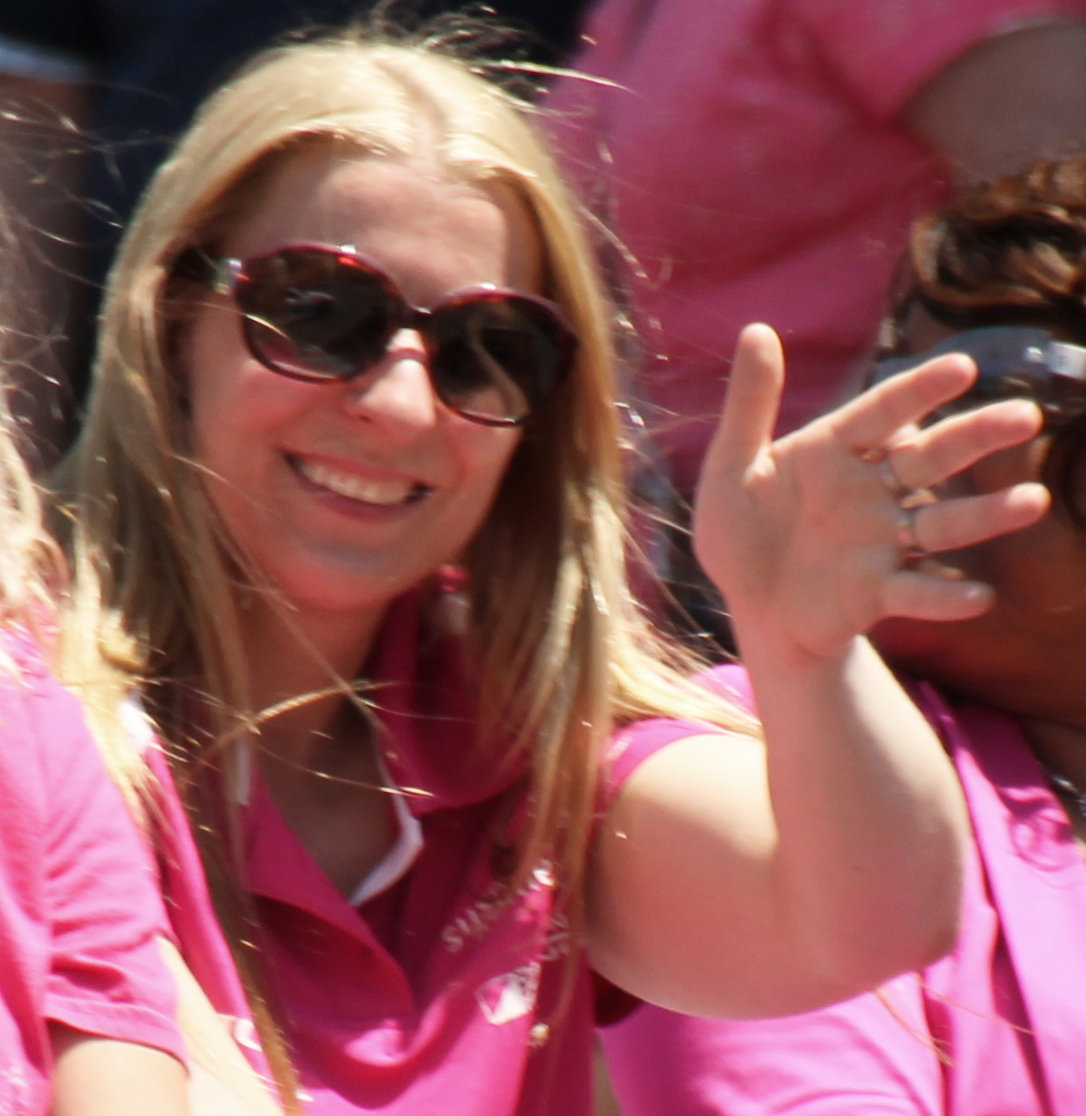
Mann at the 2015 Indianapolis 500

On 16 October 2011, Mann was involved in a 15 car chain reaction crash at Las Vegas Motor Speedway. She sustained severe burns to her right little finger and was transported by ground ambulance to UMC Southern Nevada, where she was admitted for treatment and released the next day, pending later surgery. The crash claimed the life of two-time winner of the Indianapolis 500 Dan Wheldon, and also sent J. R. Hildebrand to hospital with a bruised sternum.

In 2012, Mann was close to attempt qualifying at the Indianapolis 500 for Dale Coyne Racing. The team signed her as third driver for the 2013 edition.

In 2013, Mann competed in the Indianapolis 500, driving the No. 18 Cyclops Gear car for Dale Coyne Racing. This marked her second Indy 500 start and first with the team. Cyclops Gear, owned and founded by Mark Krause, partnered with Dale Coyne Racing for this event. In 2013, Mann finished 30th (out of 33) in the 97th annual Indianapolis 500, completing 46 of 200 laps. She also signed on to make three more large oval race starts with Cyclops Gear and Dale Coyne Racing.

In 2014, Mann qualified in 22nd position for the 98th Indianapolis 500 as the only female driver in the field and finished 24th (again out of 33) for Dale Coyne Racing and in partnership with Susan G. Komen. The partnership allowed race fans to donate for each lap Mann completed during the month of May, in support of ending breast cancer. Although encountering an issue during one of the early pit stops, she completed 484 total laps for the month and finished the entire race.

In 2015, Mann returned to the Dale Coyne Racing Team for the 99th Indianapolis 500. She qualified 25th for her fourth appearance with a four lap average speed of 223.104 mph, starting from the inside of row 9. Mann finished in 22nd place, racing for the Susan G. Komen cancer outreach organization again for the second year in a row.

After having a successful race at Indy and raising over 50,000 dollars for cancer, Mann was then asked to race again for the Dale Coyne Racing Team recalling her for the 6 June Firestone 600. Starting from the 22nd position, she took 17th place at the Texas Motor Speedway. The Dale Coyne Racing team continued changing drivers on a race-by-race basis throughout the season, with their No. 18 car recalling Mann for the remaining oval tracks. She started 22nd and finished 13th on the lead lap at the 2015 MAVTV 500 at the Auto Club Speedway. It was the best finish for the No. 18 car midway through the season for the team and one of Mann's best results in her career, since re-joining IndyCar in 2013.

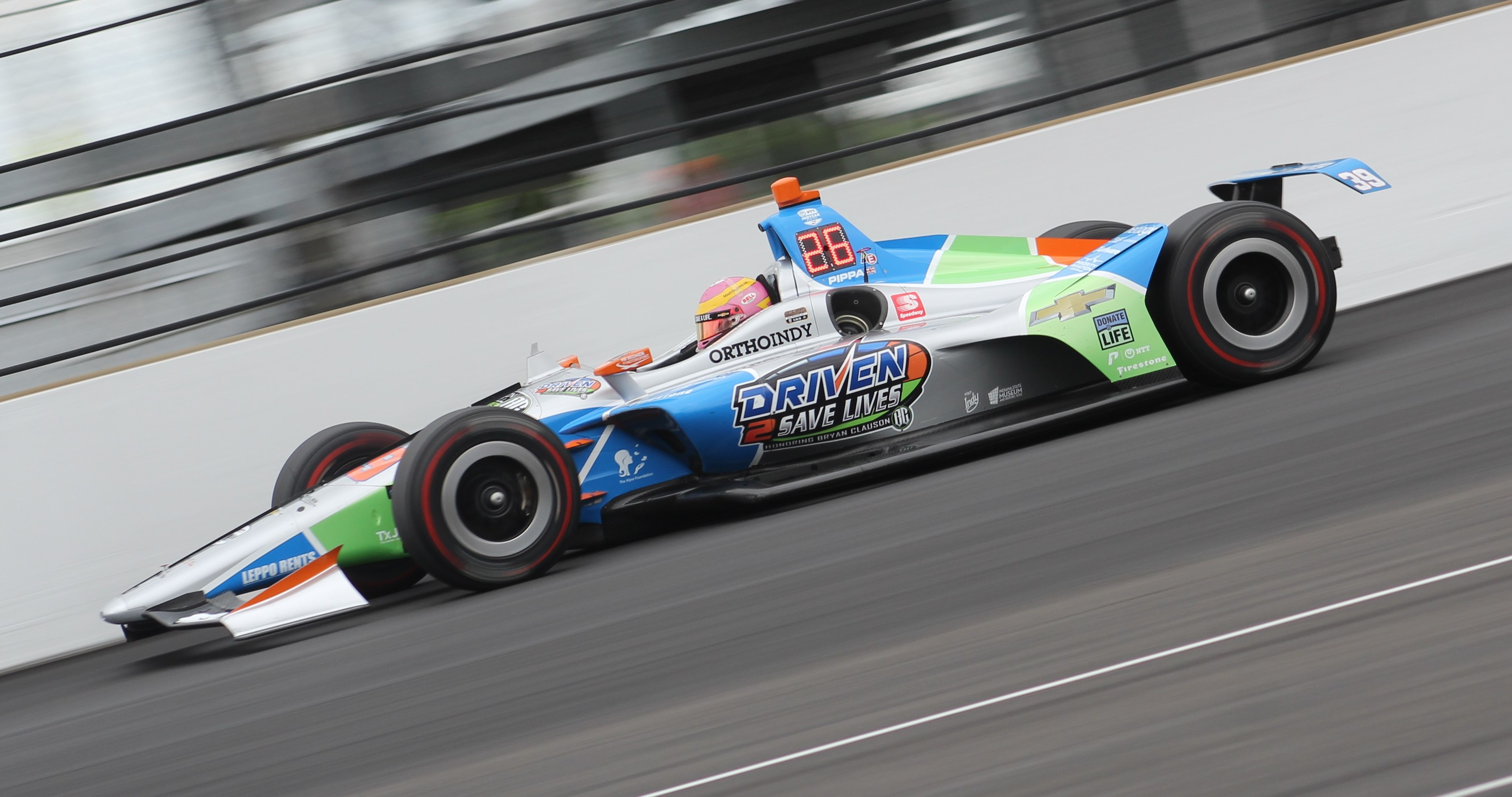
Mann driving at the 2019 Indianapolis 500

In 2016, Mann was highly recognized for her achievements, both on and off the IndyCar racing circuit. She was selected by the Susan G. Komen foundation to be on "The List", along with former First Ladies Laura Bush and Betty Ford, and 29 other key public figures, for their efforts and support in fighting breast cancer. After finishing a career-best 18th place in the 100th running of the Indianapolis 500, Mann was also named by Autocar as one of the top 100 British Women in the Car Industry.

In 2017, Mann qualified 28th for the running of the 101st Indianapolis 500, and finished midway through the pack of 33 drivers in 17th place. Just prior to qualifying on Fast Friday, Mann also became the first women to break the 230 mph barrier around the Indianapolis Motor Speedway by posting a speed record of 230.103 mph, per TrackSide Online. Mann also competed in the 2017 North America Lamborghini Super Trofeo Championship series, in which drivers compete in identical Lamborghini Cup cars based on the Lamborghini Huracán LP 620-2.

On March 20, 2018, Mann announced she would attempt to compete in her seventh Indianapolis 500 for Dale Coyne Racing. Ultimately, she was bumped from the field. She did qualify in thirtieth position for the 2019 Indianapolis 500 for Clauson-Marshall Racing, going on to record her best-ever finish in the race in 16th. She could not find sponsors to enter the 2020 Indianapolis 500.

Mann has also been a past commentator for IndyCar Radio on the IndyCar Series and Indy Lights series. She also works as a driver coach.

== Personal life ==
In December 2012, Mann married Robert Gue, an engineer at Schmidt Peterson Motorsports who is the former race strategist for James Hinchcliffe.

== Racing record ==
=== Career summary ===
Season	Series	Team	Races	Wins	Poles	F/Laps	Points	Position
2003	Formula Renault UK Winter Series	Manor Motorsport	3	0	0	0	3	22nd
2004	Formula Renault UK	Team JVA	17	0	0	0	14	34th
2005	French Formula Renault 2.0	Comtec Racing	12	0	0	0	1	21st
2005	Eurocup Formula Renault 2.0	Comtec Racing	15	0	0	0	0	NC
2006	Eurocup Formula Renault 2.0	Comtec Team	14	0	0	0	0	NC
2006	Formula Renault UK	Comtec Racing	16	0	0	0	87	19th
2007	Formula Renault 3.5 Series	Cram Competition	16	0	0	0	1	27th
2008	Formula Renault 3.5 Series	P1 Motorsport	17	0	0	0	5	25th
2008	Porsche Carrera Cup GB	Team Eurotech	6	0	0	0	15	17th
2009	Indy Lights	Panther Racing	15	0	0	0	237	14th
2010	Indy Lights	Sam Schmidt Motorsports	12	1	3	0	312	5th
2011	IndyCar Series	Conquest Racing	1	0	0	0	32	38th
2011	IndyCar Series	Rahal Letterman Lanigan Racing	1	0	0	0	32	38th
2012	Auto GP World Series	Campos Racing	2	0	0	0	5	20th
2013	IndyCar Series	Dale Coyne Racing	4	0	0	0	34	31st
2014	IndyCar Series	Dale Coyne Racing	1	0	0	0	21	33rd
2015	IndyCar Series	Dale Coyne Racing	6	0	0	0	76	27th
2016	IndyCar Series	Dale Coyne Racing	2	0	0	0	46	29th
2017	IndyCar Series	Dale Coyne Racing	1	0	0	0	32	30th
2018-19	Formula E	GEOX Dragon	Test driver					
2019	IndyCar Series	Clauson-Marshall Racing	1	0	0	0	0	31st
2021	24 Hours of Nürburgring - SP8	Giti Tire Motorsport By WS Racing	1	1	1	0	N/A	**1st**
2022	24 Hours of Nürburgring - SP8T	Giti Tire Motorsport By WS Racing	1	0	0	0	N/A	**3rd**
2023	24 Hours of Nürburgring - SP8T	Giti Tire Motorsport By WS Racing	1	0	1	1	N/A	**2nd**
2024	Nürburgring Langstrecken-Serie - SP8T	Giti Tire Motorsport By WS Racing						
2024	24 Hours of Nürburgring - SP8T	Giti Tire Motorsport By WS Racing						
2024	24H Series - GT4	ST Racing						
2025	Nürburgring Langstrecken-Serie - SP8T	Giti Tire Motorsport By WS Racing						
2026	Nürburgring Langstrecken-Serie - Cup3	Breakell Racing						

=== Complete Eurocup Formula Renault 2.0 results ===
(key) (Races in bold indicate pole position; races in italics indicate fastest lap)

Year	Entrant	1	2	3	4	5	6	7	8	9	10	11	12	13	14	15	16	DC	Points
2005	Comtec Racing	ZOL; 1; 14	ZOL; 2 Ret	VAL; 1 DNS	VAL; 2 Ret	LMS; 1 Ret	LMS; 2; 18	BIL; 1; 23	BIL; 2; 22	OSC; 1 Ret	OSC; 2; 26	DON; 1; 18	DON; 2 Ret	EST; 1; 30	EST; 2; 20	MNZ; 1; 17	MNZ; 2 Ret	39th	0
2006	Comtec Racing	ZOL; 1; 29	ZOL; 2 Ret	IST; 1; 15	IST; 2 Ret	MIS; 1; 16	MIS; 2; 21	NÜR; 1; 31	NÜR; 2; 25	DON; 1 Ret	DON; 2; 15	LMS; 1; 20	LMS; 2; 20	CAT; 1 Ret	CAT; 2; 21			35th	0

=== Formula Renault 3.5 Series results ===
(key) (Races in bold indicate pole position) (Races in italics indicate fastest lap)

Year	Team	1	2	3	4	5	6	7	8	9	10	11	12	13	14	15	16	17	DC	Points
2007	Cram Competition	MNZ; 1; 10	MNZ; 2; 15	NÜR; 1; 23	NÜR; 2; 25	MON; 1 DNQ	HUN; 1; 15	HUN; 2 Ret	SPA; 1; 17	SPA; 2; 13	DON; 1; 20	DON; 2 Ret	MAG; 1 Ret	MAG; 2 Ret	EST; 1; 24	EST; 2; 15	CAT; 1 Ret	CAT; 2 Ret	27th	1
2008	P1 Motorsport	MNZ; 1; 10	MNZ; 2; 11	SPA; 1; 16	SPA; 2 Ret	MON; 1; 18	SIL; 1; 19	SIL; 2; 20	HUN; 1; 15	HUN; 2 Ret	NÜR; 1; 7	NÜR; 2; 19	LMS; 1 Ret	LMS; 2 Ret	EST; 1 Ret	EST; 2; 15	CAT; 1; 13	CAT; 2; 13	25th	5

=== American open-wheel racing results ===
(key) (Races in bold indicate pole position)

==== Indy Lights ====
Year	Team	1	2	3	4	5	6	7	8	9	10	11	12	13	14	15	Rank	Points	Ref
2009	Panther Racing	STP1; 18	STP2; 24	LBH; 14	KAN; 16	INDY; 21	MIL; 9	IOW; 13	WGL; 14	TOR; 16	EDM; 11	KTY; 15	MOH; 15	SNM; 14	CHI; 9	HMS; 8	**14th**	**237**	
2010	Sam Schmidt Motorsports	STP; 13	ALA; 12	LBH; 8	**INDY**; 16	IOW; 8	WGL; 14	TOR; 8	EDM; 11	MOH	SNM; 5	CHI; 2	**KTY**; 1	**HMS**; 5			**5th**	**313**	

Years	Teams	Races	Poles	Wins	Podiums (Non-win)	Top 10s (Non-podium)	Championships	Ref
2	2	27	3	1	1	8	0	

==== IndyCar Series ====
Year	Team	No.	Chassis	Engine	1	2	3	4	5	6	7	8	9	10	11	12	13	14	15	16	17	18	19	Rank	Points	Ref
2011	Conquest Racing	36	Dallara IR–05	Honda	STP	ALA	LBH	SAO	INDY; 20	TXS	TXS	MIL	IOW	TOR	EDM	MOH								38th	32	
2011	Rahal Letterman Lanigan Racing	30	Dallara IR–05	Honda													NHM; DNS	SNM	BAL	MOT	KTY; 22	LVS^{1} C		38th	32	
2013	Dale Coyne Racing	63	Dallara DW12	Honda	STP	ALA	LBH	SAO	INDY; 30	DET	DET													31st	34	
2013	Dale Coyne Racing	18	Dallara DW12	Honda								TXS; 24	MIL	IOW	POC; 15	TOR	TOR	MOH	SNM	BAL	HOU	HOU	FON; 25	31st	34	
2014	Dale Coyne Racing	63	Dallara DW12	Honda	STP	LBH	ALA	IMS	INDY; 24	DET	DET	TXS	HOU	HOU	POC	IOW	TOR	TOR	MOH	MIL	SNM	FON		33rd	21	
2015	Dale Coyne Racing	63	Dallara DW12	Honda	STP	NLA	LBH	ALA	IMS	INDY; 22														29th	76	
2015	Dale Coyne Racing	18	Dallara DW12	Honda							DET	DET	TXS; 17	TOR	FON; 13	MIL; 24	IOW; 23	MOH	POC; 13	SNM				29th	76	
2016	Dale Coyne Racing	63	Dallara DW12	Honda	STP	PHX	LBH	ALA	IMS	INDY; 18	DET	DET	RDA	IOW	TOR	MOH								29th	46	
2016	Dale Coyne Racing	19	Dallara DW12	Honda													POC; 17	TXS	WGL	SNM				29th	46	
2017	Dale Coyne Racing	63	Dallara DW12	Honda	STP	LBH	ALA	PHX	IMS	INDY; 17	DET	DET	TXS	ROA	IOW	TOR	MOH	POC	GTW	WGL	SNM			30th	32	
2018	Dale Coyne Racing	63	Dallara DW12	Honda	STP	PHX	LBH	ALA	IMS	INDY; DNQ	DET	DET	TXS	RDA	IOW	TOR	MOH	POC	GTW	POR	SNM			-	0	
2019	Clauson-Marshall Racing	39	Dallara DW12	Chevrolet	STP	COA	ALA	LBH	IMS	INDY; 16	DET	DET	TXS	RDA	TOR	IOW	MOH	POC	GTW	POR	LAG			31st	28	

* Season still in progress

^{1} The Las Vegas Indy 300 was abandoned after Dan Wheldon died from injuries sustained in a 15-car crash on lap 11.

Years	Teams	Races	Poles	Wins	Podiums (Non-win)**	Top 10s (Non-podium)***	Indianapolis 500 Wins	Championships	Ref
6	3	16	0	0	0	0	0	0	

** Podium (Non-win) indicates 2nd or 3rd place finishes.
*** Top 10s (Non-podium) indicates 4th through 10th place finishes.

==== Indianapolis 500 ====
Year	Chassis	Engine	Start	Finish	Team
2011	Dallara	Honda	32	20	Conquest Racing
2013	Dallara	Honda	30	30	Dale Coyne Racing
2014	Dallara	Honda	22	24	Dale Coyne Racing
2015	Dallara	Honda	25	22	Dale Coyne Racing
2016	Dallara	Honda	25	18	Dale Coyne Racing
2017	Dallara	Honda	28	17	Dale Coyne Racing
2018	Dallara	Honda	DNQ		Dale Coyne Racing
2019	Dallara	Chevrolet	30	16	Clauson-Marshall Racing

=== Complete 24 Hours of Nürburgring results ===
Year	Team	Co-Drivers	Car	Class	Laps	Ovr. Pos.	Class Pos.	Ref
2021^{1}	(Germany) WS Racing	(France) Célia Martin (Denmark) Christina Nielsen (Germany) Carrie Schreiner	Audi R8 LMS GT4 Evo	SP8	52	45th	**1st**	
2022	(Germany) WS Racing	(France) Célia Martin (Germany) Carrie Schreiner (Liechtenstein) Fabienne Wohlwend	BMW M4 GT4 (F82)	SP8T	139	38th	**3rd**	
2023	(Germany) WS Racing	(France) Célia Martin (Netherlands) Beitske Visser (Liechtenstein) Fabienne Wohlwend	BMW M4 GT4 (G82)	SP8T	135	81st	**2nd**	
2024^{1}	(Germany) WS Racing	(Germany) Carrie Schreiner (Netherlands) Beitske Visser (Liechtenstein) Fabienne Wohlwend	BMW M4 GT4 (G82)	SP8T	44	47th	**3rd**	
2025	(United Kingdom) Breakell Racing	(United Kingdom) Rich Martin (Spain) Alvaro Fontes (Spain) Guillermo Aso	Porsche 718 Cayman GT4 Clubsport	Cup3	97	73rd	**6th**	

- **^1** – Races were shortened due to inclement weather conditions.

== Sponsors ==
Pippa Mann is sponsored by Bell Helmets, Cyclops Gear, RockStar Paint, The momentum Group, Hinchman Racing, ORTHOINDY, Oasis Outdoor and Dale Coyne Racing.
