= Clauson-Marshall Racing =

Racing team

Clauson-Marshall Racing is an American professional open-wheel racing team that competed in the IndyCar Series and the USAC Series. With Pippa Mann driving, they qualified for the 2019 Indianapolis 500. They are named in honor of Bryan Clauson.

== Racing results ==
=== IndyCar Series ===
(key)

Year	Chassis	Engine	Drivers	No.	1	2	3	4	5	6	7	8	9	10	11	12	13	14	15	16	17	Pos.	Pts.
2019					STP	COA	ALA	LBH	IMS	INDY	DET	DET	TEX	ROA	TOR	IOW	MDO	POC	GAT	POR	LAG		
2019	Dallara DW12	Chevrolet IndyCar V6t	(United Kingdom) Pippa Mann	39						16												31st	28
