= 2014 Indianapolis 500 =

American motor race

98th Indianapolis 500

Indianapolis Motor Speedway

Indianapolis 500
- Sanctioning body: INDYCAR
- Season: 2014 IndyCar season
- Date: May 25, 2014
- Winner: (United States) Ryan Hunter-Reay
- Winning team: Andretti Autosport
- Winning Chief Mechanic: Josh Freund
- Time of race: 2:40:48.2305
- Average speed: 186.563 mph (300.244 km/h)
- Pole position: (United States) Ed Carpenter
- Pole speed: 231.067 mph (371.866 km/h)
- Fastest qualifier: (United States) Ed Carpenter
- Rookie of the Year: (United States) Kurt Busch
- Most laps led: (United States) Ryan Hunter-Reay (56)

Pre-race ceremonies
- National anthem: LeAnn Rimes
- "Back Home Again in Indiana": Jim Nabors
- Starting command: Mari Hulman George/Jim Nabors
- Pace car: Chevrolet Camaro
- Pace car driver: Dario Franchitti
- Two-seater: Mario Andretti (driver); Gracie Gold (passenger)
- Starter: Paul Blevin
- Honorary starter: Mark Cuban

Television in the United States
- Network: ABC
- Announcers: Allen Bestwick, Scott Goodyear, Eddie Cheever

Chronology
Previous	Next
2013	2015

The 98th Indianapolis 500 was held at the Indianapolis Motor Speedway in Speedway, Indiana on Sunday May 25, 2014. It is the premier event of the 2014 Verizon IndyCar Series season. Tony Kanaan entered the race as the defending champion. Ed Carpenter won the pole position, his second consecutive pole at Indy. The race was won by Ryan Hunter-Reay, the first American-born winner since Sam Hornish Jr. in 2006. Hunter-Reay held off second place Hélio Castroneves by a margin of 0.0600 seconds, the third-closest finish in race history. At an average speed of 186.563 mph (300.244 km/h), it was also the second-fastest 500 in history. Marco Andretti, Carlos Muñoz, and Juan Pablo Montoya rounded out the top five. Kurt Busch, in sixth position, claimed Rookie of the Year honors.

The month of May activities opened with the inaugural Grand Prix of Indianapolis, which was won by Simon Pagenaud on May 10. Practice opened for the Indy 500 on Sunday, May 11. Time trials were held over two days, May 17–18, and a post-qualifying practice was held on May 19. The traditional final day of practice, dubbed Carb Day, was held on Friday, May 23.

All four divisions of the Road to Indy ladder participated in the month of May activities. The Cooper Tires Indy Lights held the Liberty Challenge and Freedom 100. The Pro Mazda Series and U.S. F2000 held races on the Speedway's road course, then held oval races at nearby Lucas Oil Raceway. The Stadium Super Trucks series also held an event on Carb Day.

== Event background ==
In September 2013 an IndyCar feasibility test was conducted on the Indianapolis Motor Speedway combined road course, in preparations for a possible road course race. In October 2013, the inaugural Grand Prix of Indianapolis was scheduled for Saturday, May 10, 2014.

Jim Nabors performed "Back Home Again in Indiana" before the 2014 race, marking his 35th and final time doing so. On March 25 the 83-year-old Nabors announced that he would retire from performing at the 500 because his health limits his travel from his Hawaii home.

=== Rule changes ===
Indianapolis Motor Speedway layout

A new qualifying format was introduced for 2014. Qualifying was held over two days (Saturday-Sunday), with the pole position winner not determined until the second day. The qualifying procedure were as follows:

- On the first day of time trials (Saturday May 17), all cars entered made an attempt to qualify. Qualifying was scheduled from 11:00 am to 5:50 pm. The fastest 33 cars were locked into the starting field. Actual grid positioning, however, was not yet assigned. The top nine cars from Saturday were eligible for the Fast Nine Shootout.
- On the second day of time trials (Sunday May 18), the cars that posted times from 10th–33rd would each make a qualifying attempt, beginning at 10:15 am. Saturday times would be erased, and the Sunday times would determine the starting lineup, thus eliminating "Bump Day".
- At 2 pm on Sunday, the top nine cars from Saturday will participate in the Fast Nine Shootout to determine the pole position as well as starting positions 2–9.

All engines for 2014 and beyond were required to have Twin-turbos. Single-turbo powerplants were no longer permitted. Previously, only Chevrolet (and for a brief time, Lotus) utilized a twin-turbo. Grid penalties based on unapproved engine changes were eliminated. Previously, unapproved engine changes penalties incurred during the month of May at Indianapolis would be served at the next race of the season (Detroit). Starting in 2014, the penalty will be points deductions to the manufacturers championship. If teams act in deliberate negligence to cause engine failures, the penalty will be starting from the rear of the field.

Starting in 2014, IndyCar championship points for the Indianapolis 500, as well as the Pocono 500 and MAVTV 500 (Fontana) will be doubled compared to the other races on the schedule.

== Schedule ==
Track activity commenced on Tuesday April 29 with a refresher test for Jacques Villeneuve and Kurt Busch on the oval. On Wednesday April 30, a full-field Open Test was held on the Indianapolis Motor Speedway road course. The annual Rookie Orientation Program was held on Monday May 5. The events for the inaugural Grand Prix of Indianapolis were held over three days, May 8 to 10. On Sunday May 11, the circuit was reset to the oval configuration, and practice for the Indy 500 began.

For the first time in modern history, a post-qualifying practice session (other than Carb Day) will be held on the Monday following time trials. The track will be open on Monday May 19 from 12:00–5:00 p.m.

Race schedules — April/May 2014
Sun	Mon	Tue	Wed	Thu	Fri	Sat
27	28	29; Refresher tests	30; Road course Open test	1	2	3 Mini-Marathon
4	5 ROP	6	7	8 Grand Prix; Practice	9 Grand Prix; Qualifying	10; Grand Prix of Indianapolis
11; Practice	12; Practice	13; Practice	14; Practice	15; Practice	16; Practice; Fast Friday	17; Time Trials
18; Time Trials	19; Practice	20	21; Community; Day	22; Indy Lights; Qualifying	23; Carb Day; Freedom 100	24; Legends Day; Parade
25; Indianapolis; 500	26; Memorial; Day	27	28	29	30	31

Color	Notes
Green	Practice
Dark Blue	Time trials
Silver	Race day
Red	Rained out*
Blank	No track activity

* Includes days where track activity
was significantly limited due to rain

ROP — denotes Rookie Orientation Program

== Entry list ==
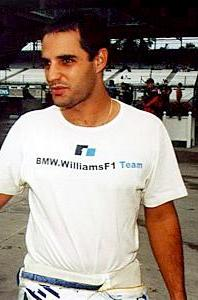
Juan Pablo Montoya returned to the Indy 500 for the first time since 2000.

The race had six former Indianapolis 500 winners entered, including two drivers returning for the first time in over a decade. Defending champion Tony Kanaan and Scott Dixon drove for Ganassi. Three-time winner Hélio Castroneves returned with Penske. He was joined by 2000 winner Juan Pablo Montoya, who returned to the Indy 500 for the first time since his victory, after spending time in Formula One and NASCAR.

Jacques Villeneuve announced he would return to the 500 with Sam Schmidt Motorsports. It was his first appearance since his victory in 1995 (this would mean Montoya, Villeneuve and Tony Kanaan would all be attempting to win the race twice consecutively). 1996 winner Buddy Lazier also returned to the 500 with Lazier Partners Racing. Lazier drove for this team in 2013, as well.

Three-time Indy 500 winner, and four-time IndyCar champion Dario Franchitti announced his retirement from racing in the fall of 2013, following a crash at Houston. In late March, Franchitti was named as the driver of the pace car.

Former NASCAR Sprint Cup Series champion Kurt Busch, who took a rookie test in 2013, announced he would enter the 500 with Andretti Autosport. He would attempt the Indy/Charlotte "Double Duty", the first driver to do so since Robby Gordon in 2004. Busch was the first NASCAR champion to enter the Indy 500, as fellow Cup champions and Indy 500 starters Bobby Allison, Tony Stewart, and Cale Yarborough had not yet won the NASCAR title at the time they raced at Indianapolis.

All told, the Indianapolis 500 featured, for the first time in history, at least one champion from Formula One, IndyCar, and NASCAR.

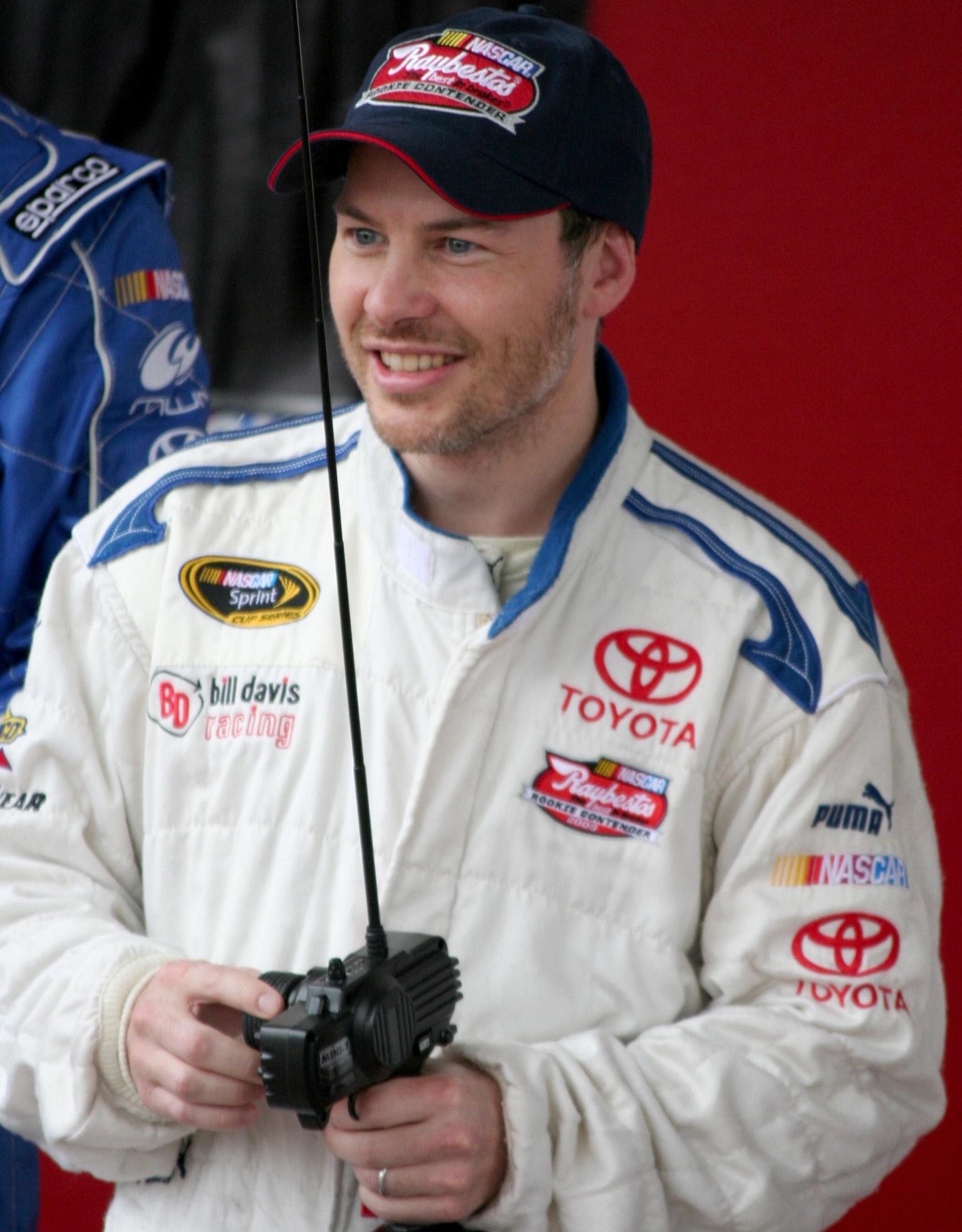
Jacques Villeneuve returned to the Indy 500 for the first time since 1995.

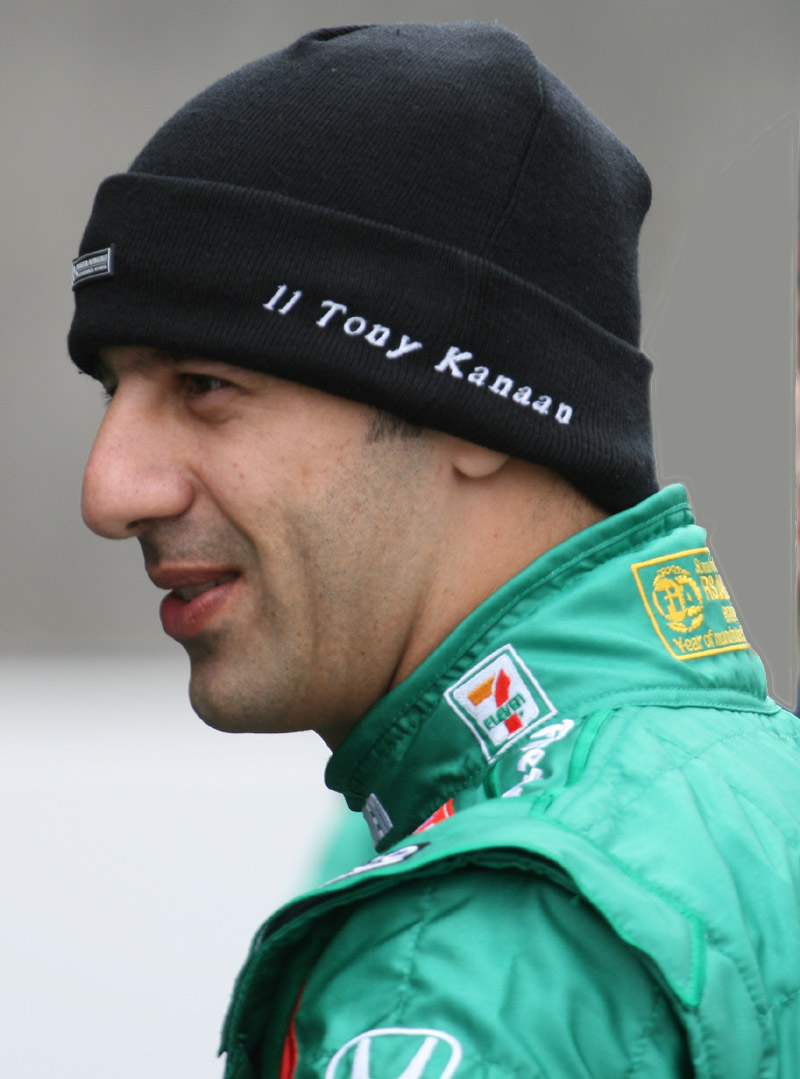
Defending race winner Tony Kanaan

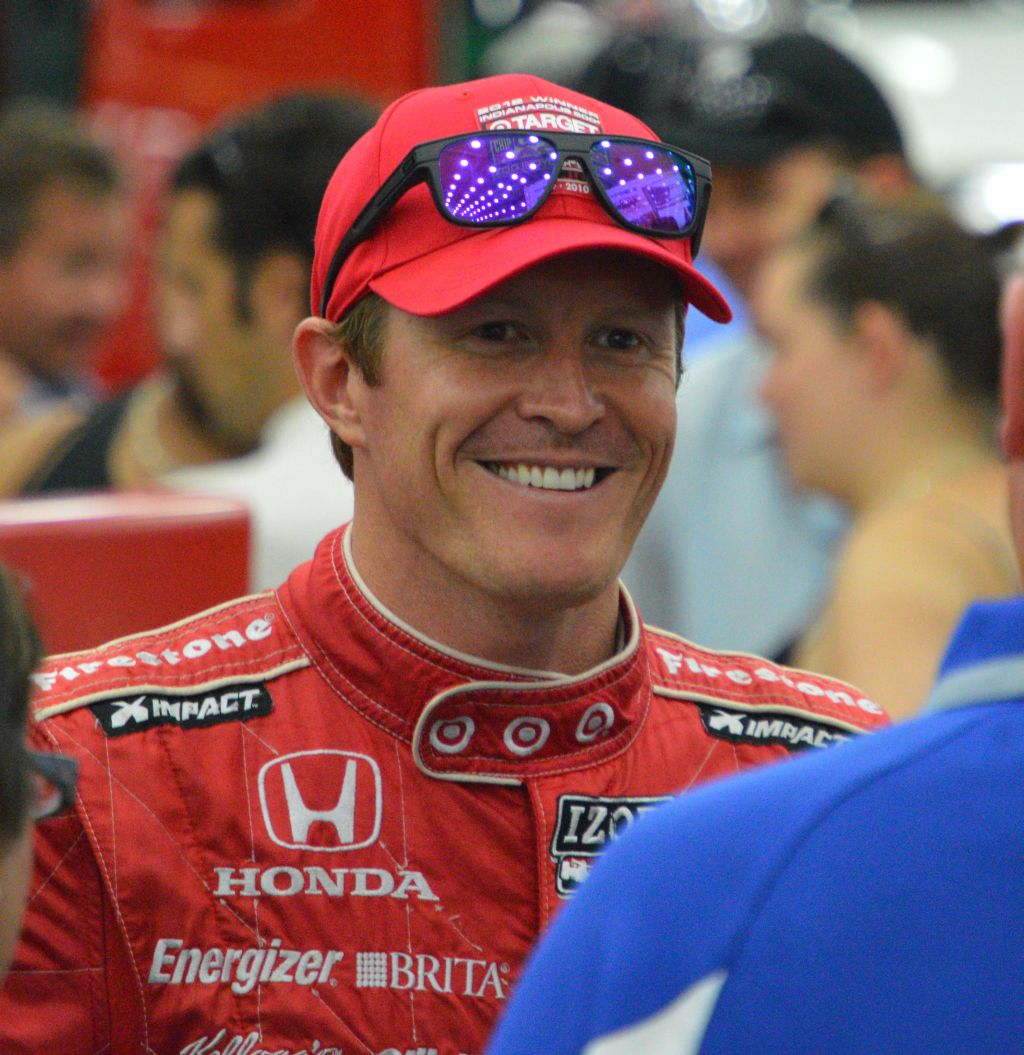
Defending IndyCar champion and 2008 winner Scott Dixon

No.	Driver	Team	Engine
2	(Colombia) Juan Pablo Montoya W	Team Penske	Chevrolet
3	(Brazil) Hélio Castroneves W	Team Penske	Chevrolet
5	(Canada) Jacques Villeneuve W	Schmidt Peterson Motorsports	Honda
6	(United States) Townsend Bell	KV Racing Technology	Chevrolet
7	(Russia) Mikhail Aleshin R	Schmidt Peterson Hamilton Motorsports	Honda
8	(Australia) Ryan Briscoe	Chip Ganassi Racing	Chevrolet
9	(New Zealand) Scott Dixon W	Chip Ganassi Racing	Chevrolet
10	(Brazil) Tony Kanaan W	Chip Ganassi Racing	Chevrolet
11	(France) Sébastien Bourdais	KV Racing Technology	Chevrolet
12	(Australia) Will Power	Team Penske	Chevrolet
14	(Japan) Takuma Sato	A. J. Foyt Enterprises	Honda
15	(United States) Graham Rahal	Rahal Letterman Lanigan Racing	Honda
16	(Spain) Oriol Servià	Rahal Letterman Lanigan Racing	Honda
17	(Colombia) Sebastián Saavedra	KV Racing Technology	Chevrolet
18	(Colombia) Carlos Huertas R	Dale Coyne Racing	Honda
19	(United Kingdom) Justin Wilson	Dale Coyne Racing	Honda
20	(United States) Ed Carpenter	Ed Carpenter Racing	Chevrolet
21	(United States) J. R. Hildebrand	Ed Carpenter Racing	Chevrolet
22	(United States) Sage Karam R	Dreyer & Reinbold Kingdom Racing	Chevrolet
25	(United States) Marco Andretti	Andretti Autosport	Honda
26	(United States) Kurt Busch R	Andretti Autosport	Honda
27	(Canada) James Hinchcliffe (Venezuela) E. J. Viso (Practice) ^{1}	Andretti Autosport	Honda
28	(United States) Ryan Hunter-Reay	Andretti Autosport	Honda
33	(Australia) James Davison R	KV Racing Technology	Chevrolet
34	(Colombia) Carlos Muñoz	Andretti Autosport	Honda
41	(United Kingdom) Martin Plowman R	A. J. Foyt Enterprises	Honda
63	(United Kingdom) Pippa Mann	Dale Coyne Racing	Honda
67	(United States) Josef Newgarden	Sarah Fisher Hartman Racing	Honda
68	(Canada) Alex Tagliani	Sarah Fisher Hartman Racing	Honda
77	(France) Simon Pagenaud	Schmidt Peterson Hamilton Motorsports	Honda
83	(United States) Charlie Kimball	Chip Ganassi Racing	Chevrolet
91	(United States) Buddy Lazier W	Lazier Partners Racing	Chevrolet
98	(United Kingdom) Jack Hawksworth R	Bryan Herta Autosport	Honda
OFFICIAL ENTRY LIST

Key	Meaning
R	Rookie
W	Past winner
^{1}	Substitute driver after Hinchcliffe injury.

== Testing and Rookie orientation ==
=== Refresher tests – Tuesday April 29 ===
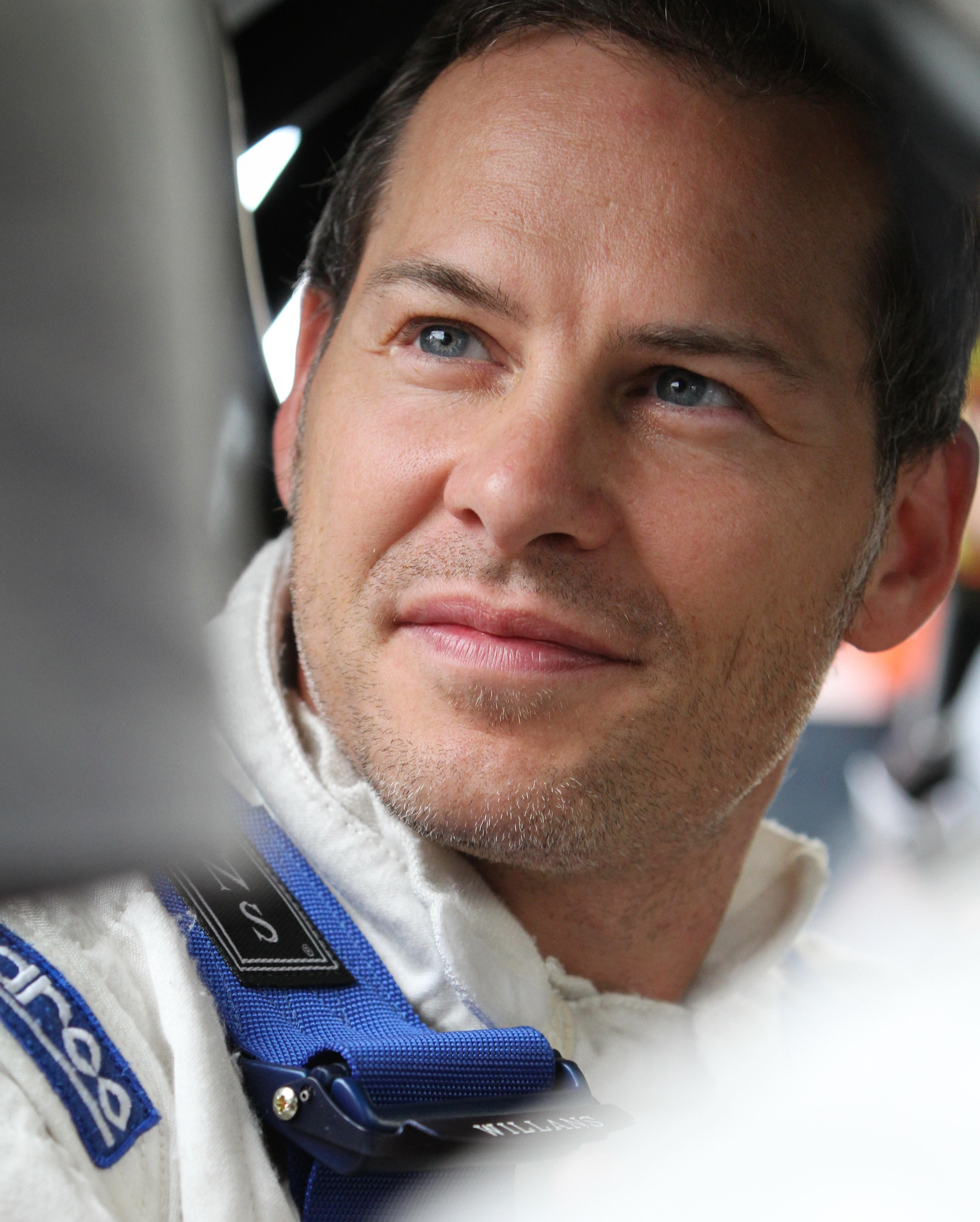
Jacques Villeneuve completed a refresher test.

The first track activity for 2014 was a refresher test involving two drivers, race rookie Kurt Busch and former winner Jacques Villeneuve. Both drivers passed their refresher test without incident. The 25-lap formal refresher test consists of the second and third phases of the official rookie test. Busch, who initially passed a rookie test in 2013, returned to the Speedway in preparations for attempting Double Duty. Villeneuve, the 1995 winner, made his first competitive laps on the oval in an Indy car since his victory in 1995. The scheduled session ended shortly after 4 p.m. due to moisture.

- Weather: 74 °F (23 °C)

Top Practice Speeds
Pos	No.	Driver	Team	Speed
1	26	(United States) Kurt Busch R	Andretti Autosport	220.844
2	5	(Canada) Jacques Villeneuve	Schmidt Peterson Hamilton Motorsports	217.742
OFFICIAL REPORT

=== Rookie Orientation – Monday May 5 ===
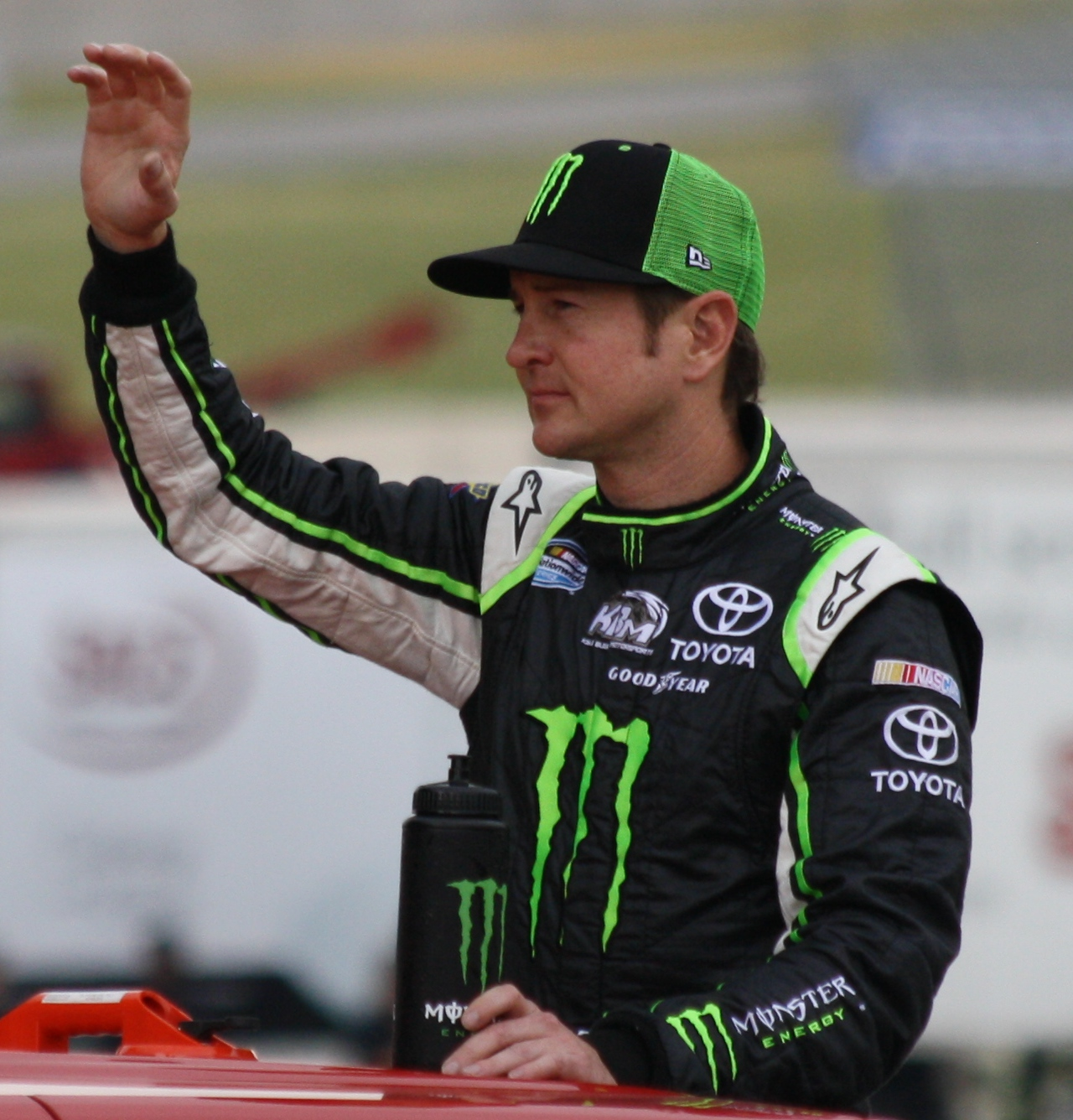
Kurt Busch led the speed chart during rookie orientation.

Seven drivers took part in the annual Rookie Orientation Program. The official rookie test consisted of three phases (10 laps at 200–205 mph, 15 laps at 205–210 mph, and 15 laps at over 210 mph). Six of the seven drivers passed all three phases. Sage Karam passed only the first two phases due to mechanical problems. The drivers completed 622 laps without incident. Kurt Busch, who completed a refresher test on April 29, returned to the track for more practice time. He completed 180 laps, and also took part in pit stop practice.

- Weather: 68 °F (20 °C), mostly sunny

Top Practice Speeds
Pos	No.	Driver	Team	Speed
1	26	(United States) Kurt Busch R	Andretti Autosport	222.289
2	7	(Russia) Mikhail Aleshin R	Sam Schmidt Motorsports	219.170
3	22	(United States) Sage Karam R	Dreyer & Reinbold Kingdom Racing	218.419
OFFICIAL REPORT

== Practice ==
=== Sunday May 11 – Opening Day practice ===
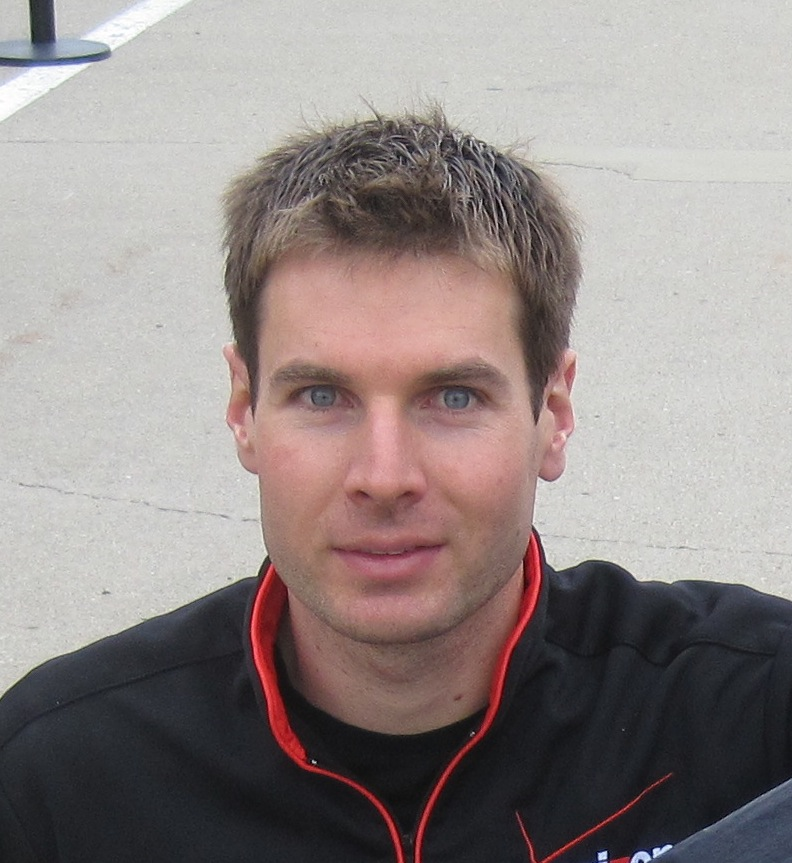
Will Power led the speed chart on Opening Day.

Opening Day practice saw Team Penske sweep the top of the speed chart. Will Power, at 223.057 mph (358.975 km/h), drove the fastest lap, while Hélio Castroneves completed the most laps (82). Early in the afternoon, rookie Sage Karam completed his rookie test. A total of 24 drivers completed 731 laps without incident. A brief yellow for lightning in the area closed the track around 4 p.m., but rain did not fall at the Speedway. E. J. Viso drove in substitution for James Hinchcliffe at Andretti Autosport. A day earlier during the Grand Prix of Indianapolis, Hinchcliffe suffered a concussion after debris struck him in the helmet. He was sidelined until cleared to drive by physicians.

- Weather: 84 °F (29 °C), mostly cloudy

Top Practice Speeds
Pos	No.	Driver	Team	Speed
1	12	(Australia) Will Power	Team Penske	223.057
2	2	(Colombia) Juan Pablo Montoya	Team Penske	222.502
3	3	(Brazil) Hélio Castroneves	Team Penske	222.373
OFFICIAL REPORT

=== Monday May 12 – Practice ===
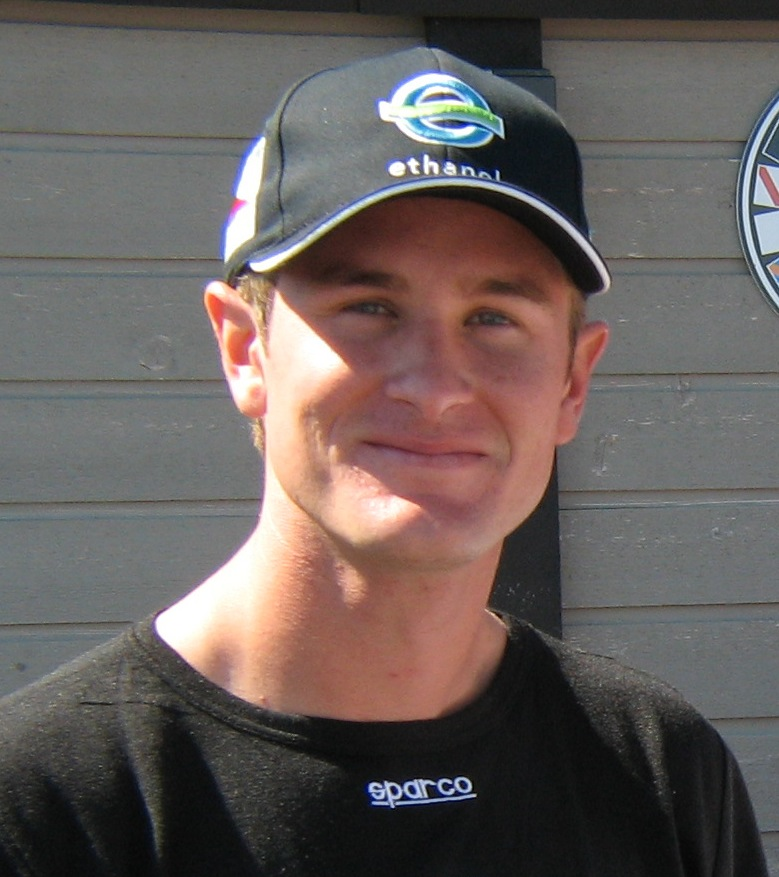
Ryan Hunter-Reay topped 225 mph on Monday.

Ryan Hunter-Reay became the first driver to break the 225 mph barrier during practice. During "Happy Hour", the final hour of practice for the day, he drove a lap of 225.025 mph (362.143 km/h). A total of 30 drivers completed 2,286 laps without major incident. Ed Carpenter suffered mechanical issues during the day. At 4:48 p.m. Carpenter's car slowed on the track with smoke trailing from the car, bringing out a yellow.

- Weather: 81 °F (27 °C), mostly cloudy

Top Practice Speeds
Pos	No.	Driver	Team	Speed
1	28	(United States) Ryan Hunter-Reay	Andretti Autosport	225.025
2	25	(United States) Marco Andretti	Andretti Autosport	224.037
3	3	(Brazil) Hélio Castroneves	Team Penske	223.635
OFFICIAL REPORT

=== Tuesday May 13 – Practice ===
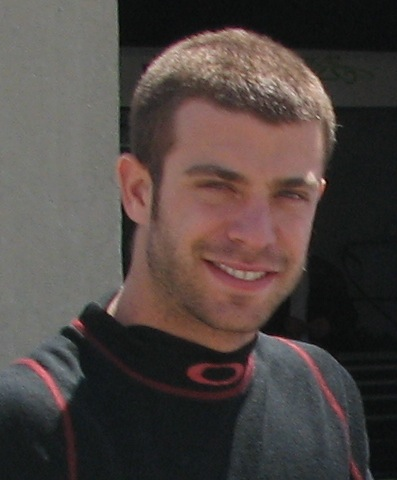
E. J. Viso

A total of 30 drivers completed 1,024 laps during an abbreviated practice session on Tuesday. Thunderstorms closed the track for the day shortly before 2 p.m. E. J. Viso, driving in substitution for James Hinchcliffe, led the speed chart with Andretti Autosport teammate Kurt Busch second. Juan Pablo Montoya posted the third-fastest speed of the day, but his day ended prematurely when his car stalled in turn four with an apparent mechanical failure.

- Weather: 79 °F (26 °C), thunderstorms

Top Practice Speeds
Pos	No.	Driver	Team	Speed
1	27	(Venezuela) E. J. Viso	Andretti Autosport	224.488
2	26	(United States) Kurt Busch R	Andretti Autosport	224.159
3	2	(Colombia) Juan Pablo Montoya	Team Penske	224.115
OFFICIAL REPORT

=== Wednesday May 14 – Practice ===
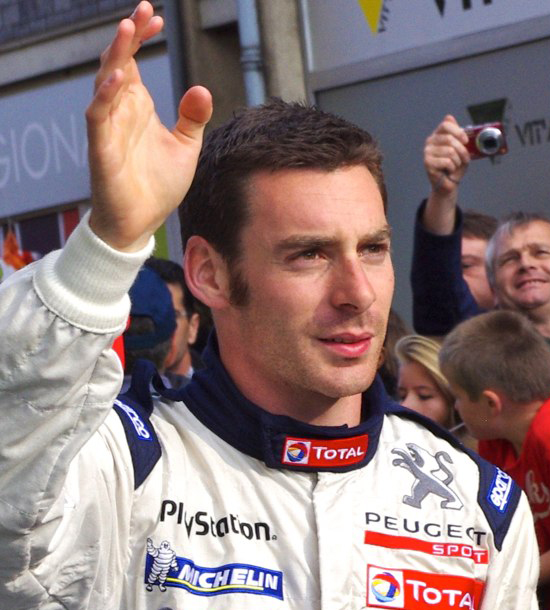
Simon Pagenaud

Rain delayed the start of practice until 5:00 p.m. Due to the delay, officials extended the practice session until 7:00 p.m. A total of 29 drivers completed 1,044 laps in a busy session. Just after 6 p.m., rookie Jack Hawksworth lost control and did a half spin in turn three, and crashed into the outside wall. It was the first crash of the month. Hawksworth was not injured. Simon Pagenaud, who won the Grand Prix of Indianapolis, turned the fastest lap of the day. He became the first driver over 226 mph for the month. At 6:24 p.m., light rain began to fall once again, and the track was closed for the day.

- Weather: 81 °F (27 °C), rain

Top Practice Speeds
Pos	No.	Driver	Team	Speed
1	77	(France) Simon Pagenaud	Schmidt Peterson Hamilton Motorsports	226.122
2	21	(United States) J. R. Hildebrand	Ed Carpenter Racing	225.854
3	9	(New Zealand) Scott Dixon	Chip Ganassi Racing	225.494
OFFICIAL REPORT

=== Thursday May 15 – Practice ===
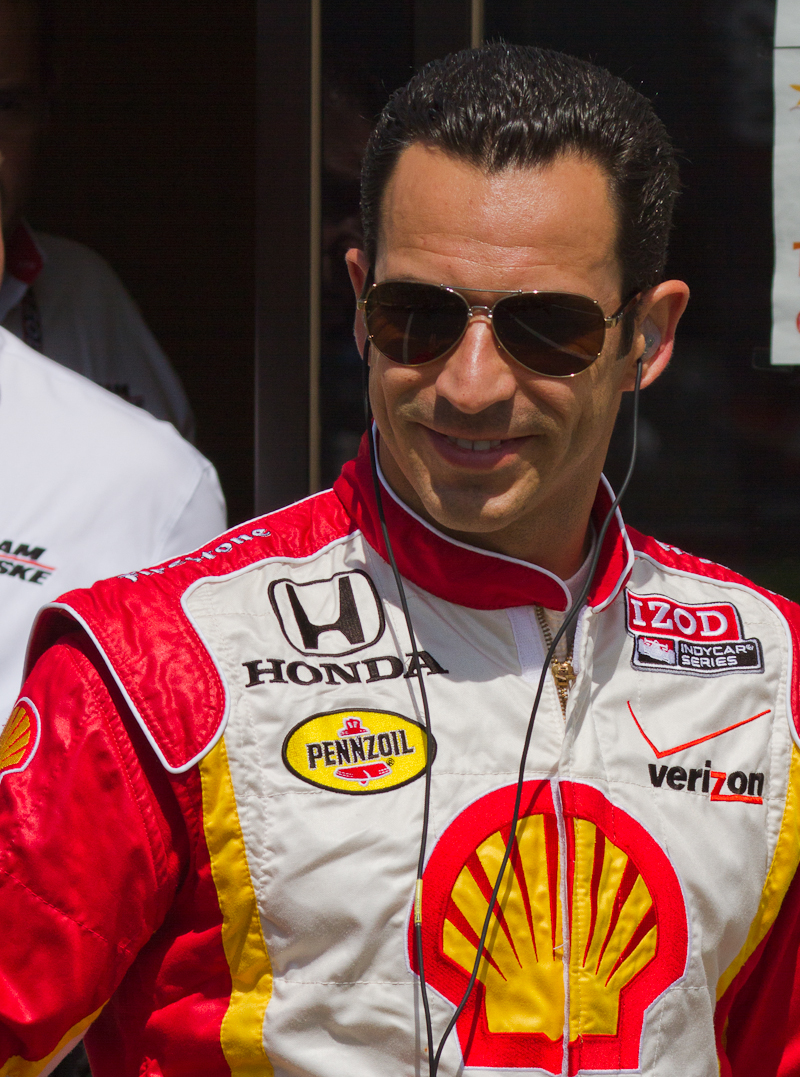
Hélio Castroneves

The busiest day of practice thus far saw 34 drivers complete 2,516 laps. In the final hour, Hélio Castroneves completed the fastest lap of the month, the first driver over 227 mph. Three drivers – rookie James Davison, Buddy Lazier, and James Hinchcliffe – took their first laps of the week. Hinchcliffe was back out on the track after being clear to drive after his concussion. Both E. J. Viso and Pippa Mann suffered mechanical/engine issues. The most serious issue of the day belonged to Mikhail Aleshin, who stopped on the course with an engine fire.

- Weather: 50 °F (10 °C), cloudy

Top Practice Speeds
Pos	No.	Driver	Team	Speed
1	3	(Brazil) Hélio Castroneves	Team Penske	227.166
2	20	(United States) Ed Carpenter	Ed Carpenter Racing	226.257
3	12	(Australia) Will Power	Team Penske	225.899
OFFICIAL REPORT

=== Friday May 16 – Fast Friday Practice ===
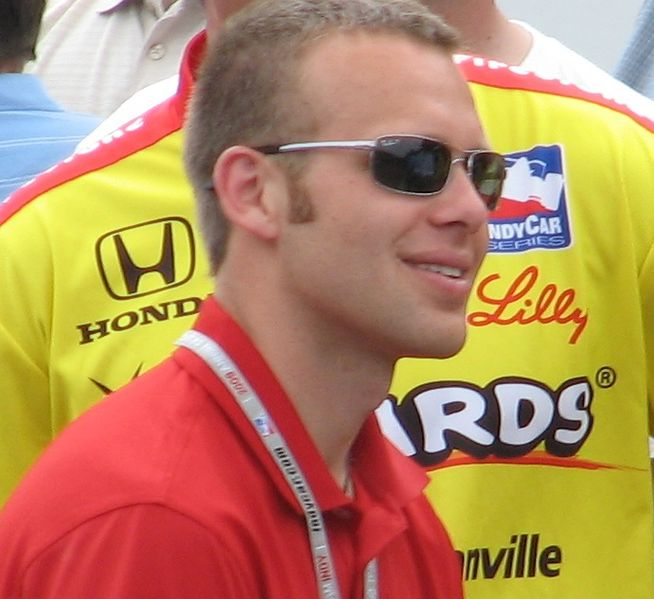
Ed Carpenter

Rain kept the cars off the track most of the day, and allowed only a 19-minute practice session on Fast Friday. Ed Carpenter set the fastest lap of the month during the brief session, with a lap of 230.522 mph (370.989 km/h). It was the first 230 mph lap at the Speedway since 2003. All cars were permitted 140 kPa of turbocharger "boost" during practice on Friday, up from 130 kPa allowed Sunday through Thursday. No incidents were reported. Six different drivers topped the speed chart on each of the six practice days.

- Weather: 53 °F (12 °C), rain

Top Practice Speeds
Pos	No.	Driver	Team	Speed
1	20	(United States) Ed Carpenter	Ed Carpenter Racing	230.522
2	3	(Brazil) Hélio Castroneves	Team Penske	229.843
3	25	(United States) Marco Andretti	Andretti Autosport	229.419
OFFICIAL REPORT

== Time trials ==
=== First Day – Saturday May 17 ===
Ed Carpenter set the fastest qualifying speed of the day, leading the nine drivers who advanced to the Fast Nine Shootout on Sunday.

- Weather: 55 °F (13 °C), partly cloudy

First Round – Saturday, May 17, 2014
Pos.	No.	Driver	Team	Engine	Speed	Pts.
Fast 9 Shootout Qualifiers: Positions 1–9
1	20	(United States) Ed Carpenter	Ed Carpenter Racing	Chevrolet	230.661	33
2	34	(Colombia) Carlos Muñoz	Andretti Autosport	Honda	230.460	32
3	3	(Brazil) Hélio Castroneves	Team Penske	Chevrolet	230.432	31
4	27	(Canada) James Hinchcliffe	Andretti Autosport	Honda	230.407	30
5	12	(Australia) Will Power	Team Penske	Chevrolet	230.323	29
6	25	(United States) Marco Andretti	Andretti Autosport	Honda	230.134	28
7	77	(France) Simon Pagenaud	Schmidt Peterson Hamilton Motorsports	Honda	230.070	27
8	67	(United States) Josef Newgarden	Sarah Fisher Hartman Racing	Honda	230.033	26
9	21	(United States) J. R. Hildebrand	Ed Carpenter Racing	Chevrolet	230.027	25
OFFICIAL REPORT
Locked-In Qualifiers: Positions 10–30
10	26	(United States) Kurt Busch R	Andretti Autosport	Honda	229.960	24
11	28	(United States) Ryan Hunter-Reay	Andretti Autosport	Honda	229.899	23
12	98	(United Kingdom) Jack Hawksworth R	Bryan Herta Autosport	Honda	229.816	22
13	2	(Colombia) Juan Pablo Montoya	Team Penske	Chevrolet	229.785	21
14	9	(New Zealand) Scott Dixon	Chip Ganassi Racing	Chevrolet	229.283	20
15	7	(Russia) Mikhail Aleshin R	Schmidt Peterson Hamilton Motorsports	Honda	229.091	19
16	19	(United Kingdom) Justin Wilson	Dale Coyne Racing	Honda	228.947	18
17	8	(Australia) Ryan Briscoe	Chip Ganassi Racing	Chevrolet	228.825	17
18	14	(Japan) Takuma Sato	A. J. Foyt Enterprises	Honda	228.786	16
19	83	(United States) Charlie Kimball	Chip Ganassi Racing	Chevrolet	228.710	15
20	15	(United States) Graham Rahal	Rahal Letterman Lanigan Racing	Honda	228.664	14
21	22	(United States) Sage Karam R	Dreyer & Reinbold Kingdom Racing	Chevrolet	228.650	13
22	6	(United States) Townsend Bell	KV Racing Technology	Chevrolet	228.508	12
23	10	(Brazil) Tony Kanaan	Chip Ganassi Racing	Chevrolet	228.435	11
24	11	(France) Sébastien Bourdais	KV Racing Technology	Chevrolet	228.388	10
25	63	(United Kingdom) Pippa Mann	Dale Coyne Racing	Honda	228.358	9
26	17	(Colombia) Sebastián Saavedra	KV Racing Technology	Chevrolet	228.294	8
27	5	(Canada) Jacques Villeneuve	Schmidt Peterson Motorsports	Honda	228.171	7
28	33	(Australia) James Davison R	KV Racing Technology	Chevrolet	228.150	6
29	16	(Spain) Oriol Servià	Rahal Letterman Lanigan Racing	Honda	228.034	5
30	18	(Colombia) Carlos Huertas R	Dale Coyne Racing	Honda	227.991	4
Non-Locked-In Qualifiers: Positions 31–33
31	68	(Canada) Alex Tagliani	Sarah Fisher Hartman Racing	Honda	227.813	3
32	41	(United Kingdom) Martin Plowman R	A. J. Foyt Enterprises	Honda	227.043	2
33	91	(United States) Buddy Lazier	Lazier Partners Racing	Chevrolet	226.543	1

=== Second Day – Sunday May 18 ===
The second day of time trials set the starting grid for positions 10 through 33, and then featured the Fast Nine Shootout. During the early session, Juan Pablo Montoya set the fastest time, and qualified for the 10th position. During the Fast Nine Shootout, Ed Carpenter became the eleventh driver ever to win the pole position two consecutive years with a four-lap average of 231.067 mph (371.866 km/h), the fastest qualifying speed since 2003. The 33-car field average was 229.382 mph (369.155 km/h) — the fastest overall average in "500" history.

- Weather: TBA

Pos.	No.	Driver	Team	Engine	Speed	Pts.
Fast 9 Shootout: Positions 1–9
1	20	(United States) Ed Carpenter	Ed Carpenter Racing	Chevrolet	231.067	9
2	27	(Canada) James Hinchcliffe	Andretti Autosport	Honda	230.839	8
3	12	(Australia) Will Power	Team Penske	Chevrolet	230.697	7
4	3	(Brazil) Hélio Castroneves	Team Penske	Chevrolet	230.649	6
5	77	(France) Simon Pagenaud	Schmidt Peterson Hamilton Motorsports	Honda	230.614	5
6	25	(United States) Marco Andretti	Andretti Autosport	Honda	230.544	4
7	34	(Colombia) Carlos Muñoz	Andretti Autosport	Honda	230.146	3
8	67	(United States) Josef Newgarden	Sarah Fisher Hartman Racing	Honda	229.893	2
9	21	(United States) J. R. Hildebrand	Ed Carpenter Racing	Chevrolet	228.726	1

Pos.	No.	Driver	Team	Engine	Speed
Positions 10–33
10	2	(Colombia) Juan Pablo Montoya	Team Penske	Chevrolet	231.007
11	9	(New Zealand) Scott Dixon	Chip Ganassi Racing	Chevrolet	230.928
12	26	(United States) Kurt Busch R	Andretti Autosport	Honda	230.782
13	98	(United Kingdom) Jack Hawksworth R	Bryan Herta Autosport	Honda	230.506
14	19	(United Kingdom) Justin Wilson	Dale Coyne Racing	Honda	230.256
15	7	(Russia) Mikhail Aleshin R	Schmidt Peterson Hamilton Motorsports	Honda	230.049
16	10	(Brazil) Tony Kanaan	Chip Ganassi Racing	Chevrolet	229.922
17	11	(France) Sébastien Bourdais	KV Racing Technology	Chevrolet	229.847
18	16	(Spain) Oriol Servià	Rahal Letterman Lanigan Racing	Honda	229.752
19	28	(United States) Ryan Hunter-Reay	Andretti Autosport	Honda	229.719
20	15	(United States) Graham Rahal	Rahal Letterman Lanigan Racing	Honda	229.628
21	18	(Colombia) Carlos Huertas R	Dale Coyne Racing	Honda	229.251
22	63	(United Kingdom) Pippa Mann	Dale Coyne Racing	Honda	229.223
23	14	(Japan) Takuma Sato	A. J. Foyt Enterprises	Honda	229.201
24	68	(Canada) Alex Tagliani	Sarah Fisher Hartman Racing	Honda	229.148
25	6	(United States) Townsend Bell	KV Racing Technology	Chevrolet	229.009
26	83	(United States) Charlie Kimball	Chip Ganassi Racing	Chevrolet	228.953
27	5	(Canada) Jacques Villeneuve	Schmidt Peterson Motorsports	Honda	228.949
28	33	(Australia) James Davison R	KV Racing Technology	Chevrolet	228.865
29	41	(United Kingdom) Martin Plowman R	A. J. Foyt Enterprises	Honda	228.814
30	8	(Australia) Ryan Briscoe	Chip Ganassi Racing	Chevrolet	228.713
31	22	(United States) Sage Karam R	Dreyer & Reinbold Kingdom Racing	Chevrolet	228.436
32	17	(Colombia) Sebastián Saavedra	KV Racing Technology	Chevrolet	228.088
33	91	(United States) Buddy Lazier	Lazier Partners Racing	Chevrolet	227.920

== Post-qualifying practice and Carb Day ==
=== Monday May 19 – Post-qualifying practice ===
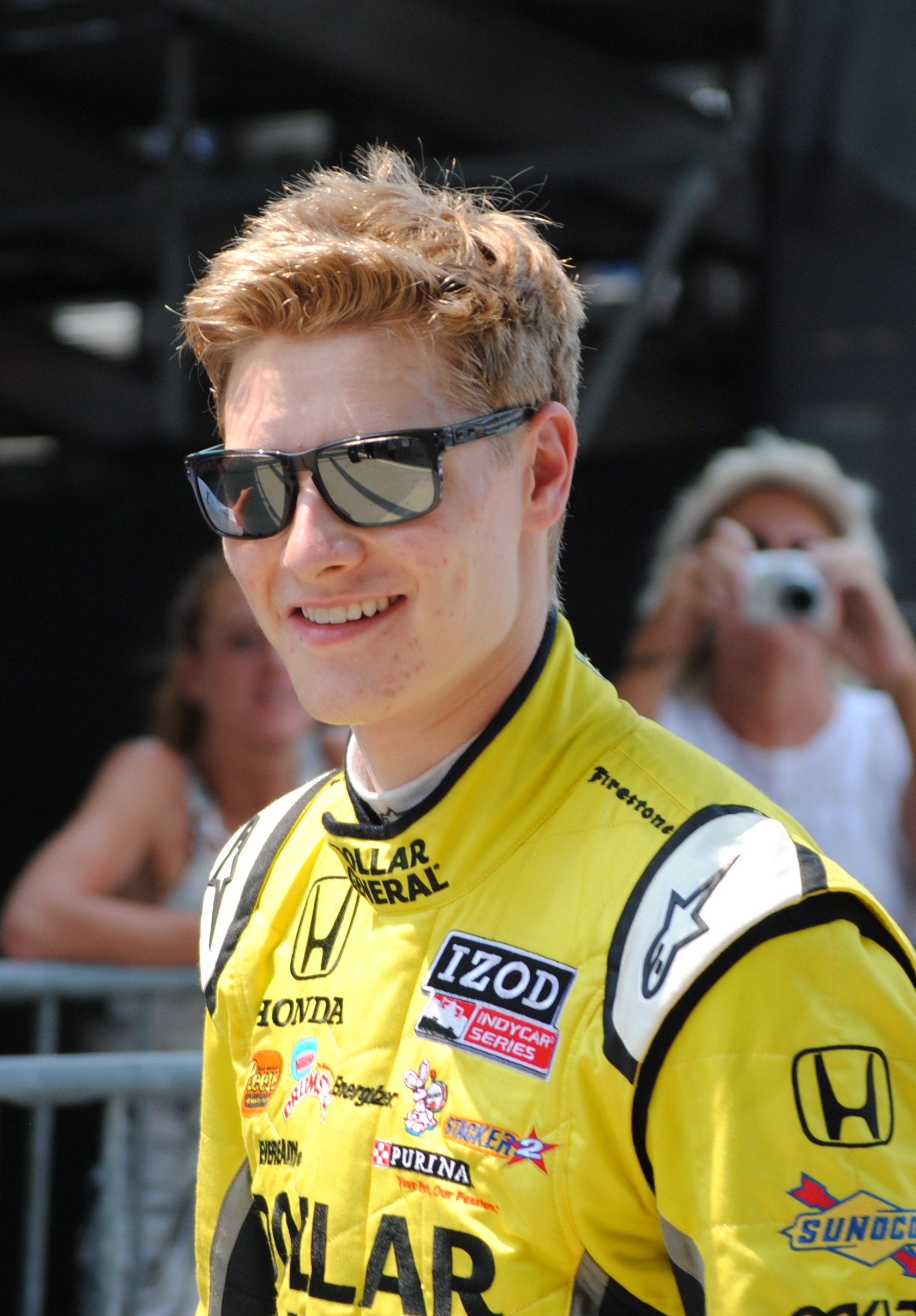
Josef Newgarden

The 33 qualified cars participated in a post-qualifying practice session on Monday from 12 noon until 5 p.m. The drivers completed 2,329 laps with Josef Newgarden fastest of the day. At 1:35 p.m. Kurt Busch's car got loose in turn two, he lost control, and crashed into the outside wall at the exit of turn two. The car had heavy damage on the right side, but Busch was uninjured.

- Weather: 70 °F (21 °C), partly sunny

Top Practice Speeds
Pos	No.	Driver	Team	Speed
1	67	(United States) Josef Newgarden	Sarah Fisher Hartman Racing	227.105
2	2	(Colombia) Juan Pablo Montoya	Team Penske	226.532
3	9	(New Zealand) Scott Dixon	Chip Ganassi Racing	226.433
OFFICIAL REPORT

=== Friday May 23 – Carb Day practice ===
All 33 drivers took laps during the final 60-minute practice session. Target Chip Ganassi Racing teammates Tony Kanaan and Scott Dixon led the speed chart. One minor incident involved rookie Sage Karam, who lightly brushed the outside wall in the exit of turn four. The car suffered only very minor damage.

- Weather: 67 °F (19 °C)

Top Practice Speeds
Pos	No.	Driver	Team	Speed
1	10	(Brazil) Tony Kanaan	Chip Ganassi Racing	227.838
2	9	(New Zealand) Scott Dixon	Chip Ganassi Racing	227.773
3	6	(United States) Townsend Bell	KV Racing Technology	227.221
OFFICIAL REPORT

=== Friday May 23 – Pit Stop Challenge ===
The 37th annual TAG Heuer Pit Stop Challenge was held Friday May 23. A total of twelve drivers/teams qualified. The teams of Takuma Sato, Will Power, Scott Dixon, and Helio Castroneves, received first-round byes, and advanced directly to the quarterfinals. Chip Ganassi Racing with driver Scott Dixon defeated Dreyer & Reinbold-Kingdom Racing (Sage Karam) in the final round to win the annual tournament. It was Ganassi's second win the contest.

First Round
28	Ryan Hunter-Reay (Andretti Autosport)	13.150
22	Sage Karam (Dreyer & Reinbold)	13.026
77	Simon Pageneud (Schmidt Peterson)	13.730
83	Charlie Kimball (Chip Ganassi Racing)	14.219
2	Juan Pablo Montoya (Team Penske)	12.808
15	Graham Rahal (Rahal Letterman)	14.923
10	Tony Kanaan (Chip Ganassi Racing)	12.980
8	Ryan Briscoe (Chip Ganassi Racing)	12.679

Quarterfinals
22	Sage Karam (Dreyer & Reinbold)	14.603
14	Takuma Sato (A. J. Foyt Racing)	15.294
77	Simon Pageneud (Schmidt Peterson)	12.904
12	Will Power (Team Penske)	12.618
2	Juan Pablo Montoya (Team Penske)	15.364
9	Scott Dixon (Chip Ganassi Racing)	13.110
8	Ryan Briscoe (Chip Ganassi Racing)	DNF
3	Helio Castroneves (Team Penske)	14.349

Semifinals
22	Sage Karam (Dreyer & Reinbold)	13.359
12	Will Power (Team Penske)	14.196
9	Scott Dixon (Chip Ganassi Racing)	12.285
3	Helio Castroneves (Team Penske)	12.758

Finals
22	Sage Karam (Dreyer & Reinbold)	12.084
9	Scott Dixon (Chip Ganassi Racing)	11.737

== Starting grid ==
(R) = Indianapolis 500 rookie; (W) = Former Indianapolis 500 winner

Row	Inside		Middle		Outside	
1	20	(United States) Ed Carpenter	27	(Canada) James Hinchcliffe	12	(Australia) Will Power
2	3	(Brazil) Hélio Castroneves (W)	77	(France) Simon Pagenaud	25	(United States) Marco Andretti
3	34	(Colombia) Carlos Muñoz	67	(United States) Josef Newgarden	21	(United States) J. R. Hildebrand
4	2	(Colombia) Juan Pablo Montoya (W)	9	(New Zealand) Scott Dixon (W)	26	(United States) Kurt Busch (R)
5	98	(United Kingdom) Jack Hawksworth (R)	19	(United Kingdom) Justin Wilson	7	(Russia) Mikhail Aleshin (R)
6	10	(Brazil) Tony Kanaan (W)	11	(France) Sébastien Bourdais	16	(Spain) Oriol Servià
7	28	(United States) Ryan Hunter-Reay	15	(United States) Graham Rahal	18	(Colombia) Carlos Huertas (R)
8	63	(United Kingdom) Pippa Mann	14	(Japan) Takuma Sato	68	(Canada) Alex Tagliani
9	6	(United States) Townsend Bell	83	(United States) Charlie Kimball	5	(Canada) Jacques Villeneuve (W)
10	33	(Australia) James Davison (R)	41	(United Kingdom) Martin Plowman (R)	8	(Australia) Ryan Briscoe
11	22	(United States) Sage Karam (R)	17	(Colombia) Sebastián Saavedra	91	(United States) Buddy Lazier (W)

== Race summary ==
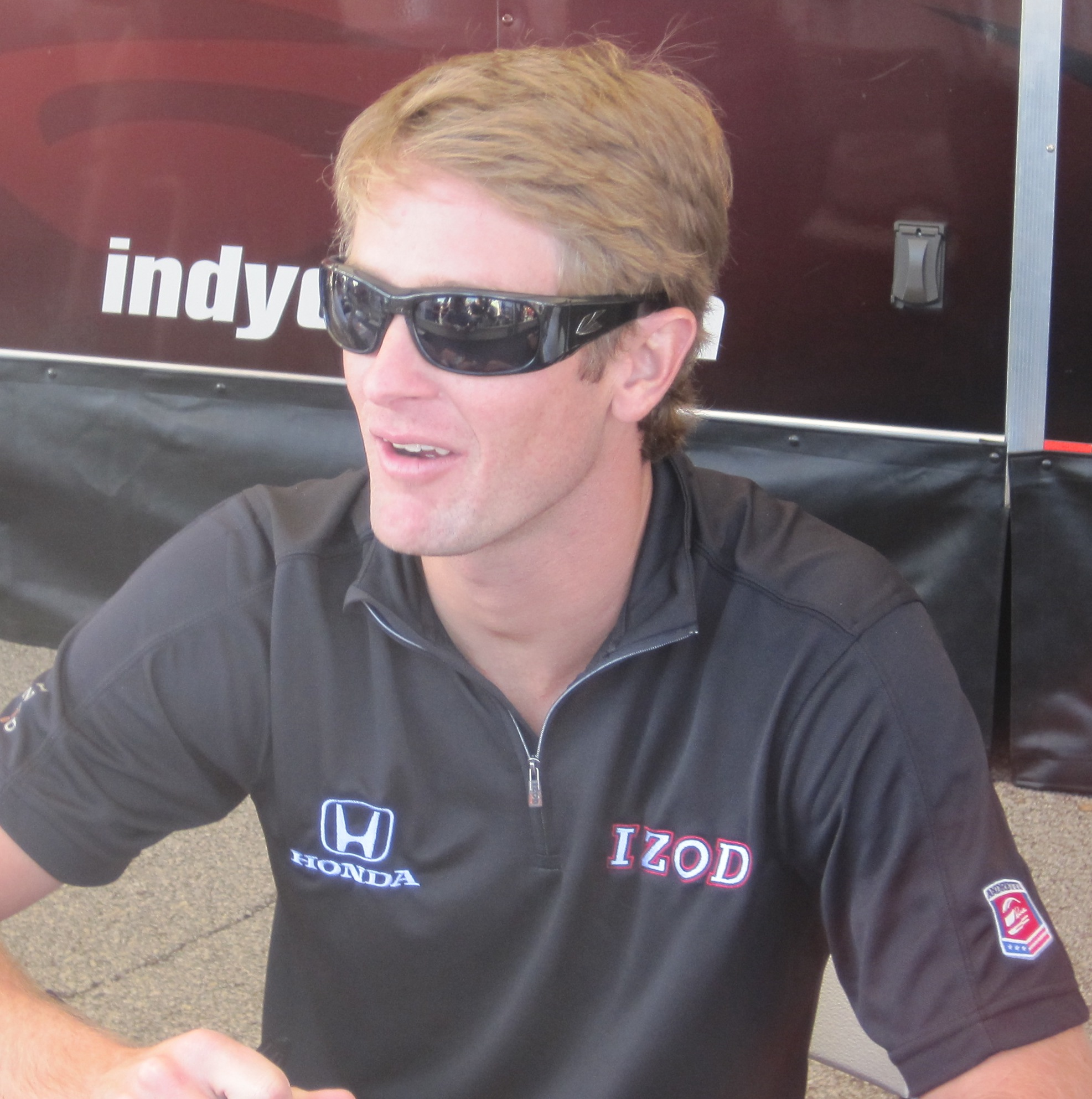
Ryan Hunter-Reay became the first American driver to win the race since 2006

=== Start ===
Race morning dawned with blue skies, and no chance of rain. Mari Hulman George and Jim Nabors gave the command to start engines together, and pace car driver Dario Franchitti led the field on the parade and pace laps. A clean start saw James Hinchcliffe grab the lead into turn one. Exiting turn two, Ryan Briscoe nearly spun and crashed, but kept the car under control without incident.

Hinchcliffe led the first nine laps, then polesitter Ed Carpenter took the lead on lap 10. Unlike the previous year, lead changes were at a minimum in the opening laps.

=== First half ===
The race went caution free for the first 149 laps. It marked the longest stretch of consecutive laps without a caution since before records were kept beginning in 1976. It also set a record for most consecutive laps from the start of the race before the first yellow. The modern era record was 66 laps in 2000, while the 1954 race reportedly went 110 laps before the first yellow caution period.

The field shuffled through several green-flag pit stops, while only two cars dropped out in the first half. Graham Rahal retired after 44 laps, suffering from electrical issues which kept shutting off the engine. Buddy Lazier was sidelined with clutch issues, but not before he moved into 7th place all-time in laps/miles completed at Indy.

On lap 66, Tony Kanaan's chances of winning were dashed. He ran out of fuel, but made it back to the pits. He returned to the track after a lengthy 43-second pit stop, but was back in the pits seven laps later with a broken starter. Kanaan fell 18 laps down as the crew made repairs.

At the halfway point, leader Ryan Hunter-Reay set a new record with an average speed of 211.871 mph.

=== Second half ===
A spin-out and crash involving Charlie Kimball on lap 149 brought out the first yellow flag. The leaders pitted, and the green came back out on lap 158. Ten laps later, Scott Dixon crashed in turn four, bringing out the second caution of the day. Dixon's crash snapped a streak of 1,733 consecutive laps completed at Indy, dating back to the start of the 2006 race.

The green came out for a restart with 25 laps to go. Ryan Hunter-Reay led Ed Carpenter, Townsend Bell, James Hinchcliffe, and Hélio Castroneves. As the field jockeyed down the main stretch, Hunter-Reay led into turn one. Directly behind him, Carpenter and Bell went side-by-side going into turn one. At that moment, Hinchcliffe dove to the inside, making it three-abreast into turn one. Hinchcliffe touched with Carpenter, sending both cars spinning and crashing into the outside wall. Bell, Castroneves, and the rest of the field slipped by unscathed. After the race, Carpenter angrily said "if he didn't have a concussion last week I would have punched him in the face."

=== Red flag ===
The green came out on lap 180, with Ryan Hunter-Reay leading. The lead shuffled quickly between Marco Andretti, Hélio Castroneves, and then back to Hunter-Reay. Then on lap 191, Townsend Bell crashed hard into the outside wall at the exit of turn two, damaging the SAFER barrier. With less than nine laps remaining, officials elected to put out the red flag and halted the race to allow workers to clean up the incident, repair the barrier, and allow the opportunity for a green flag finish. Considerable debris, along with damage to the SAFER Barrier and catchfence, required a red flag of nearly 11 minutes.

The red flag drew some mild controversy, but it was generally praised by most fans and competitors in the effort to prevent the race from finishing under caution. Eight of the previous twelve Indy 500s had finished under caution due to a late-race crash or rain.

=== Finish ===
The cars re-fired and took two yellow warm-up laps. The green came with six laps to go. Ryan Hunter-Reay led the field into turn one, Hélio Castroneves tucked into second, with Marco Andretti close behind in third. The leaders started taking an extremely low line down the front and back straights, forcing their competitors to make passes to the outside.

With five laps to go, Castroneves made a slingshot pass on the inside, and took the lead into turn one. Andretti challenged Hunter-Reay going into turn three, but was unable to make the pass. On the next time by the start/finish line, Castroneves was able to maintain the lead going into turn one. The top three cars stayed nose-to-tail going down the backstretch, at which time Hunter-Reay made a daring dive pass below the white line to take the lead going into turn three. The field crossed the start/finish line for three laps to go with Hunter-Reay leading.

With two laps to go, Castroneves went to the outside to pass Hunter-Reay going into turn one to retake the lead. The two raced nose-to-tail, with Andretti fading in third. As the field came down the main stretch to receive the white flag, Hunter-Reay made a slingshot pass to the outside to again retake the lead. He pulled out to a lead down the backstretch, and Castroneves was unable to challenge going into turn 3. As they came off of turn four, Castroneves tried to close the gap, and drafted going down the main stretch. He made a move to the outside, but Hunter-Reay was able to hold off the challenge, and won the race by 0.0600 seconds. It was the second-closest finish in race history at the time, only behind 1992.

"This race was ridiculously close and competitive," Hunter-Reay said after the race. "Just glad I picked the right time to go." Andretti placed third, while Carlos Muñoz finished fourth. Juan Pablo Montoya placed fifth in his first Indy 500 since he won it in 2000. Kurt Busch completed the race in sixth place then flew to North Carolina for the Coca-Cola 600. His attempt to become the second driver to complete 1,100 miles in one day came up short when his engine blew later on at the Coca-Cola 600 after completing 271 of 400 laps.

The win made Hunter-Reay the first American to win the Indianapolis 500 in eight years. Between Hunter-Reay, Andretti, and Muñoz, Andretti Autosport had three cars in the top four, and four of the top six with Kurt Busch as well.

== Box score ==
Pos	No.	Driver	Team	Chassis	Engine	Laps	Status	Grid	Points
1	28	(United States) Ryan Hunter-Reay	Andretti Autosport	Dallara DW12	Honda	200	186.563 mph	19	126
2	3	(Brazil) Hélio Castroneves W	Team Penske	Dallara DW12	Chevrolet	200	+0.0600	4	118
3	25	(United States) Marco Andretti	Andretti Autosport	Dallara DW12	Honda	200	+0.3171	6	103
4	34	(Colombia) Carlos Muñoz	Andretti Autosport	Dallara DW12	Honda	200	+0.7795	7	99
5	2	(Colombia) Juan Pablo Montoya W	Team Penske	Dallara DW12	Chevrolet	200	+1.3233	10	82
6	26	(United States) Kurt Busch R	Andretti Autosport	Dallara DW12	Honda	200	+2.2666	12	80
7	11	(France) Sébastien Bourdais	KV Racing Technology	Dallara DW12	Chevrolet	200	+2.6576	17	62
8	12	(Australia) Will Power	Team Penske	Dallara DW12	Chevrolet	200	+2.8507	3	85
9	22	(United States) Sage Karam R	Dreyer & Reinbold Kingdom Racing	Dallara DW12	Chevrolet	200	+3.2848	31	57
10	21	(United States) J. R. Hildebrand	Ed Carpenter Racing	Dallara DW12	Chevrolet	200	+3.4704	9	66
11	16	(Spain) Oriol Servià	Rahal Letterman Lanigan Racing	Dallara DW12	Honda	200	+4.1077	18	43
12	77	(France) Simon Pagenaud	Schmidt Peterson Motorsports	Dallara DW12	Honda	200	+4.5677	5	68
13	68	(Canada) Alex Tagliani	Sarah Fisher Hartman Racing	Dallara DW12	Honda	200	+7.6179	24	38
14	5	(Canada) Jacques Villeneuve W	Schmidt Peterson Motorsports	Dallara DW12	Honda	200	+8.1770	27	39
15	17	(Colombia) Sebastián Saavedra	KV Racing Technology	Dallara DW12	Chevrolet	200	+8.5936	32	38
16	33	(Australia) James Davison R	KV Racing Technology	Dallara DW12	Chevrolet	200	+9.1043	28	34
17	18	(Colombia) Carlos Huertas R	Dale Coyne Racing	Dallara DW12	Honda	200	+12.1541	21	30
18	8	(Australia) Ryan Briscoe	Chip Ganassi Racing	Dallara DW12	Chevrolet	200	+13.3143	30	41
19	14	(Japan) Takuma Sato	A. J. Foyt Enterprises	Dallara DW12	Honda	200	+13.7950	23	38
20	98	(United Kingdom) Jack Hawksworth R	Bryan Herta Autosport	Dallara DW12	Honda	200	+13.8391	13	42
21	7	(Russia) Mikhail Aleshin R	Schmidt Peterson Motorsports	Dallara DW12	Honda	198	-2 laps	15	37
22	19	(United Kingdom) Justin Wilson	Dale Coyne Racing	Dallara DW12	Honda	198	-2 laps	14	36
23	41	(United Kingdom) Martin Plowman R	A. J. Foyt Enterprises	Dallara DW12	Honda	196	-4 laps	29	16
24	63	(United Kingdom) Pippa Mann	Dale Coyne Racing	Dallara DW12	Honda	193	-7 laps	22	31
25	6	(United States) Townsend Bell	KV Racing Technology	Dallara DW12	Chevrolet	190	Crash T2	25	22
26	10	(Brazil) Tony Kanaan W	Chip Ganassi Racing	Dallara DW12	Chevrolet	177	-23 laps	16	22
27	20	(United States) Ed Carpenter	Ed Carpenter Racing	Dallara DW12	Chevrolet	175	Crash T1	1	53
28	27	(Canada) James Hinchcliffe	Andretti Autosport	Dallara DW12	Honda	175	Crash T1	2	49
29	9	(New Zealand) Scott Dixon W	Chip Ganassi Racing	Dallara DW12	Chevrolet	167	Crash T4	11	30
30	67	(United States) Josef Newgarden	Sarah Fisher Hartman Racing	Dallara DW12	Honda	156	Crash T4	8	38
31	83	(United States) Charlie Kimball	Chip Ganassi Racing	Dallara DW12	Chevrolet	149	Crash T2	26	25
32	91	(United States) Buddy Lazier W	Lazier Partners Racing	Dallara DW12	Chevrolet	87	Clutch	33	11
33	15	(United States) Graham Rahal	Rahal Letterman Lanigan Racing	Dallara DW12	Honda	44	Electrical	20	24
OFFICIAL BOX SCORE

W Former Indianapolis 500 winner

R Indianapolis 500 Rookie

All entrants utilized Firestone tires.

=== Race statistics ===
- Lead changes: 34 amongst 11 drivers

Lap Leaders
Laps	Leader	Laps	Leader
1–9	James Hinchcliffe	118–123	Ryan Hunter-Reay
10–28	Ed Carpenter	124	Scott Dixon
29	James Hinchcliffe	125–132	Juan Pablo Montoya
30	Will Power	133–138	Ryan Hunter-Reay
31	Tony Kanaan	139–153	Marco Andretti
32	Mikhail Aleshin	154–157	Ed Carpenter
33–36	James Hinchcliffe	158–162	Ryan Hunter-Reay
37–57	Will Power	163	Ed Carpenter
58–61	Marco Andretti	164–170	Ryan Hunter-Reay
62	Hélio Castroneves	171–173	Alex Tagliani
63	Scott Dixon	174–181	Ryan Hunter-Reay
64–66	Juan Pablo Montoya	182	Marco Andretti
67–91	Hélio Castroneves	183–184	Ryan Hunter-Reay
92–93	Ed Carpenter	185	Hélio Castroneves
94	Scott Dixon	186–195	Ryan Hunter-Reay
95–99	Juan Pablo Montoya	196	Hélio Castroneves
100–107	Ryan Hunter-Reay	197–200	Ryan Hunter-Reay
108–117	Hélio Castroneves		

Total laps led
Laps	Leader
Ryan Hunter-Reay	56
Hélio Castroneves	38
Ed Carpenter	26
Will Power	22
Marco Andretti	20
Juan Pablo Montoya	16
James Hinchcliffe	14
Alex Tagliani	3
Scott Dixon	3
Mikhail Aleshin	1
Tony Kanaan	1

Cautions: 5 for 21 laps
Laps	Reason
150–156	Charlie Kimball crash in turn 2
168–174	Scott Dixon, Josef Newgarden crash in turn 4
176–179	Ed Carpenter, James Hinchcliffe crash in turn 1
191	Debris in turn 2
192–193	Townsend Bell crash in turn 2; Red flag

== Broadcasting ==
=== Television ===
In the United States, ABC broadcast both feature races in the IndyCar Series during the Indianapolis 500 meeting. This marks the fiftieth consecutive year that ABC has broadcast the 500. ABC also carried time trials for the first time since 2008. Long-time NASCAR play-by-play announcer Allen Bestwick, who has worked the Brickyard 400 since 2001, made his Indy 500 debut for 2014. Previous anchor Marty Reid had retired from the network on September 29, 2013, following an error during the broadcast of the NASCAR Nationwide Series Kentucky 300 (a race that was worked by IMS Radio on the radio side). During pole qualifying on Sunday May 18, Dario Franchitti joined the ABC booth as guest analyst. Carb Day coverage was carried by NBC Sports Network, with Bob Varsha serving as announcer.

International broadcasters included Foxtel Speed in Australia, Bandeirantes in Brazil, Motors TV in France, Sport1US in Germany, GAORA Sports in Japan, ESPN in Latin America and BT Sport 2 in the United Kingdom.

ABC Television
Booth Announcers	Pit/garage reporters
Host: Lindsay Czarniak; Announcer: Allen Bestwick; Color: Scott Goodyear; Color: Eddie Cheever	Jerry Punch; Vince Welch; Jamie Little; Rick DeBruhl

=== Radio ===
Paul Page, who served as the radio announcer for the 500 from 1977 to 1987, and later the television announcer (1988–1998, 2002–2004) returned to the radio booth. He anchored the radio broadcast, replacing Mike King, who resigned after 2013. Veteran Indy driver Robbie Buhl joined Page for the broadcast as race analyst, substituting for normal IMS Radio analyst Pippa Mann, who was participating in the race. This was Buhl's only year on the broadcast, but he had covered IndyCar races (including Indy 500 time trials) on Versus for multiple seasons. After several years covering the pit area, Kevin Lee took the turn four position. Lee was substituting for Chris Denari, who missed the race due to commitments with the Pacers and Fever. Nick Yeoman reported from victory lane.

Page ushered in some changes to the broadcast upon his return. He re-instated the turn one reporting location, with Jerry Baker manning the position. Page also brought back his Delta Force Intros, made popular from his days on television. During commercial breaks, the famous out-cue was recited by Page himself. In the previous few years, driver-recorded and historical out-cues were used.

For the 2014 race, the network reached an audience of 11 million listeners, and was carried on 400 terrestrial radio affiliates.

1070 The Fan broadcast nightly beginning April 29 with Trackside with Curt Cavin and Kevin Lee, followed by Donald Davidson's The Talk of Gasoline Alley. However, several episodes of each were pre-empted due to Pacers playoff coverage. About two months after the race, veteran broadcaster, and former IMS Radio Network announcer Gary Lee died. Lee had been part of the broadcast from 1990 to 1998.

Indianapolis Motor Speedway Radio Network
Booth Announcers	Turn Reporters	Pit/garage reporters
Chief Announcer: Paul Page; Driver expert: Robbie Buhl; Historian: Donald Davidson	Turn 1: Jerry Baker; Turn 2: Jake Query; Turn 3: Mark Jaynes; Turn 4: Kevin Lee	Dave Wilson (north pits); Dave Furst (north-center pits); Nick Yeoman (south-center pits); Michael Young (south pits)

== Footnotes ==
=== Works cited ===
- IndyCar.com
- IndyStar.com
- WFNI 1070 The Fan
- Weather.com – Speedway, Indiana

=== References ===
Previous race: 2014 Grand Prix of Indianapolis	IndyCar Series; 2014 season	Next race: 2014 Chevrolet Detroit Belle Isle Grand Prix
Previous race: 2013 Indianapolis 500	Indianapolis 500	Next race: 2015 Indianapolis 500
