= 2011 MoveThatBlock.com Indy 225 =

Motor race held in Loudon, New Hampshire

(United States) 2011 MoveThatBlock.com Indy 225
Race details
- Race 13 of 18 in the 2011 IndyCar Series season
- Layout of New Hampshire Motor Speedway
- Date: August 14, 2011
- Official name: MoveThatBlock.com Indy 225
- Location: New Hampshire Motor Speedway; Loudon, New Hampshire, United States
- Course: Permanent racing facility 1.058 mi / 1.703 km
- Distance: 215 laps 227.470 mi / 366.077 km
- Scheduled Distance: 225 laps 238.050 mi / 383.104 km
- Weather: 73 °F (23 °C), cloudy

Pole position
- Driver: (United Kingdom) Dario Franchitti (Chip Ganassi Racing)
- Time: 43.1976 (2-lap)

Fastest lap
- Driver: (New Zealand) Scott Dixon (Chip Ganassi Racing)
- Time: 22.3481 (on lap 149 of 215)

Podium
- First: (United States) Ryan Hunter-Reay (Andretti Autosport)
- Second: (Spain) Oriol Servià (Newman/Haas Racing)
- Third: (New Zealand) Scott Dixon (Chip Ganassi Racing)

The 2011 MoveThatBlock.com Indy 225 was an IZOD IndyCar Series open-wheel race that was held on August 14, 2011 at New Hampshire Motor Speedway in Loudon, New Hampshire before 28,000 spectators. It was the 13th round of the 2011 IZOD IndyCar Series and the eighth and final running of the event (counting the four years under Championship Auto Racing Teams (CART) sanctioning). The 215-lap race, shortened from its scheduled distance of 225 laps because of rain, was won by Ryan Hunter-Reay of Andretti Autosport. Newman/Haas Racing driver Oriol Servià finished second, and Scott Dixon came in third for Chip Ganassi Racing.

Dario Franchitti, the championship leader heading into the race, won the pole position by setting the fastest two-lap time in qualifying. Pippa Mann was injured in a crash during the final practice session and did not start the race. Franchitti led 115 of the first 117 laps, but was taken out of the race because of a collision with Takuma Sato during a restart, breaking a 43-race streak of consecutive finishes. Hunter-Reay then assumed the lead and dominated the second half of the race, only relinquishing the lead during green-flag pit stops.

A caution flag was issued on the 206th lap for light rainfall, which worsened as the drivers slowly paced around the track. Though many of the drivers and team owners complained that the track surface had become unsafe, the race resumed on lap 218, only for a five-car crash to ensue on the front stretch. Among the drivers involved in the crash was championship contender Will Power, who was so irate that he flipped off the officials on the live broadcast. The failed restart attempt prompted heavy criticism towards Brian Barnhart, the series' already-controversial race director, who was eventually ousted from his role in November 2011.

To undo the championship implications of the crash, the running order on lap 215 was used as the final finishing results, meaning that Hunter-Reay had earned his fifth career victory. The decision was protested by Servià's and Dixon's teams because they had both crossed the start/finish line ahead of Hunter-Reay and they felt that reverting the finishing order was unfair, as no such rule existed in the series' rulebook. However, a three-man panel ruled on August 23 that Barnhart was correct to revert the order and the results were upheld with Hunter-Reay, Servià, and Dixon in the top-three positions. This was ultimately the last IndyCar Series race at New Hampshire Motor Speedway because of low attendance.

== Background ==
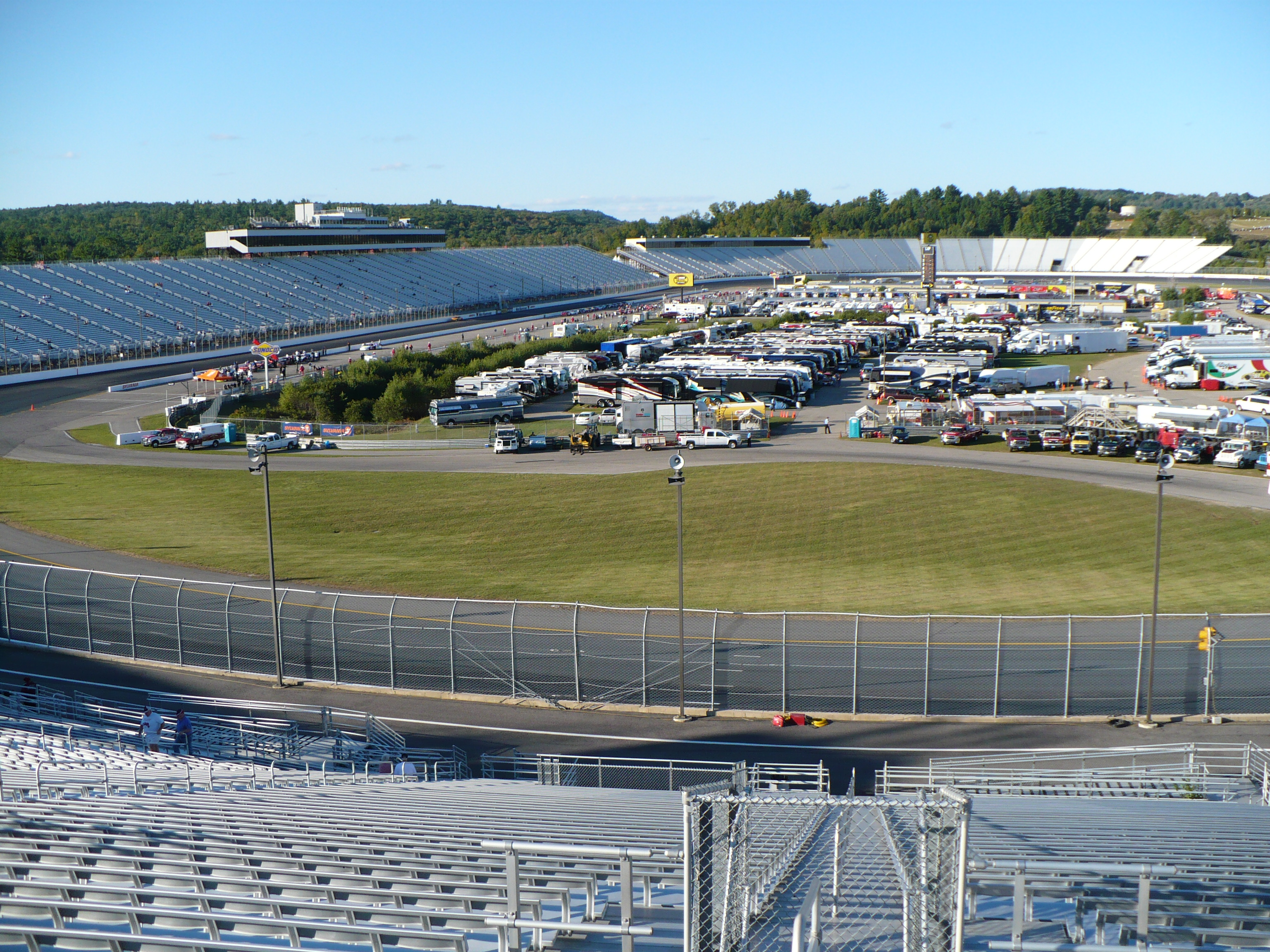
New Hampshire Motor Speedway (pictured in 2007), where the race was held.

New Hampshire Motor Speedway is a four-turn, 1.058 mi (1.703 km) oval track with variable banking of two-to-seven-degrees in the turns. Following four CART series races at New Hampshire from 1992 to 1995, the IndyCar Series (then the Indy Racing League) debuted at the track in 1996. However, low attendance rates caused series officials to remove the track from its schedule after 1998.

On the day of the 2010 Lenox Industrial Tools 301 NASCAR Sprint Cup Series race, Speedway Motorsports Inc. (SMI) chief executive officer (CEO) Bruton Smith, track vice president and general manager Jerry Gappens, and IndyCar CEO Randy Bernard announced that the IndyCar Series would return to the track on July 30, 2011, as part of a three-year deal. Gappens revealed that he and SMI had been planning the deal since they bought out the track in January 2008. Dario Franchitti, who won the Indianapolis 500 a month prior to the announcement, completed three demonstration laps around the track. The race was later pushed back to August 14, 2011, due to schedule changes for the track's NASCAR weekends. In June 2011, the race gained title sponsorship from real estate website MoveThatBlock.com, thus naming the event the MoveThatBlock.com Indy 225. The Firestone Indy Lights, American Canadian Tour, and NASCAR Whelen Modified Tour hosted support races during the weekend.

The MoveThatBlock.com Indy 225 was to be held over a distance of 225 laps and 238.05 miles (383.10 km). It was the 13th of 18 scheduled open-wheel races for the 2011 IZOD IndyCar Series. Heading into the race, Franchitti had earned 428 points and held a 62-point lead over second-placed Will Power in the Drivers' Championship standings. Scott Dixon was third with 335 points, followed by Tony Kanaan on 283 and Oriol Servià on 268. Despite Power's win at Edmonton, two collisions with Franchitti at Toronto and Mid-Ohio raised the championship contenders' tensions and caused the gap between them in the standings to widen. Franchitti initially insinuated that Power purposefully attempted to spin him in the preceding Mid-Ohio race, but later surmised that it was only because he and Power had been racing so closely.

There were 27 cars entered for the race that represented 15 different teams. All cars used the Dallara IR-05 chassis and the Honda Indy V8 engine. Tomas Scheckter took Justin Wilson's seat in the No. 22 Dreyer & Reinbold Racing car after Wilson suffered a fracture to his fifth thoracic vertebrae in a practice crash at Mid-Ohio and was expected to stay out of racing for the rest of the season. Wilson expressed disappointment with his injury, especially because he felt that his season had been improving, but was determined to heal his back. Alex Lloyd also replaced Sébastien Bourdais in Dale Coyne Racing's No. 19 car because Bourdais decided not to compete in any oval races that season. Rahal Letterman Lanigan Racing appeared for the first time since the twin Texas races in June with Pippa Mann, who finished fifth in the 2010 Firestone Indy Lights standings. She was also set to compete in the races at Kentucky and Las Vegas.

Because most of the IndyCar Series drivers had no experience racing at New Hampshire Motor Speedway, several tests were conducted at the track leading up to the event. Kanaan and Dixon participated in the first test at the track on August 31 and September 1, 2010, which was conducted by Firestone to assess their tires' durability. Dixon spoke positively of the track and predicted that the race would be "unbelievable". On July 5, 2011, Power and Mann took part in a private test at the track. An open test was held to all teams of the series on August 11, three days before the race. The test was split into a two-and-a-half-hour morning session and a three-hour afternoon session. Franchitti was the quickest driver in both sessions, with lap times of 21.7419 seconds in the morning and 21.5665 seconds in the afternoon. The only incident of the day occurred in the afternoon, when Mann spun into the tire barrier on the left side of the track in turn two with the rear wing of her car.

== Practice and qualifying ==
Pippa Mann (pictured in 2011) did not compete in the race because of a severe crash in the final practice session.

Two practice sessions on Saturday preceded the race on Sunday; the first session was held for 75 minutes and the second lasted 60 minutes. James Hinchcliffe's time of 21.6492 seconds was the quickest in the first practice session, followed by Graham Rahal, Kanaan, Servià, and Takuma Sato. The session was paused three times: the first was for debris on the track, the second for Mann spinning and avoiding wall contact, and the third for Ed Carpenter spinning in turn two. As Charlie Kimball attempted to avoid Carpenter, Danica Patrick hit the rear of Kimball, who then contacted Carpenter's car.

The second session was planned to be divided into two groups to allow drivers to prepare for qualifying. However, the track surface had become slippery because of the American Canadian Tour race, so IndyCar officials extended the session by ten minutes and allowed all drivers to participate after the first group ended. Rahal led the session with a 21.7008-second lap, while Franchitti, Hinchcliffe, Sato, and Ryan Briscoe were second- through fifth-quickest. With 25 minutes left in the session, Mann slammed the concrete wall in the second turn with the rear end of her car. The black box installed in Mann's car recorded an impact force of over 110 g (1,078.73 m/s^{2}). She was seen limping out of her car, showing clear signs of injury to her left leg. Safety marshals placed her on a stretcher and transported her to the Concord Hospital by ambulance for further evaluation. She also revealed through posts on Facebook and Twitter that she suffered a concussion, two bone injuries to her vertebrae, and a swollen ankle and knee. Although X-rays and CT scans of Mann's neck were negative, the IndyCar medical staff did not approve her to drive until she underwent a final medical test in Indianapolis, Indiana on Monday. As a result, Rahal Letterman Lanigan Racing withdrew their No. 30 car that she was planning to race. She was later ruled out of competition for the next four-to-six weeks.

During the qualifying session, which was held two hours after the final practice session ended, each driver was required to complete two laps, and the cumulative time of those laps would determine their starting position. Franchitti earned the 26th pole position of his American open-wheel car racing career and his second of the season with a two-lap time of 43.1976 seconds. His second lap, which was timed at 21.5968 seconds, broke an IndyCar Series track record that was established by Richie Hearn in 1996. He also earned a bonus point for winning the pole. Servià qualified second with a time that was 0.2573 seconds slower than Franchitti's. Kanaan took third, while Hinchcliffe earned his best career qualifying result of fourth place. Ryan Hunter-Reay, Briscoe, Dixon, Sato, Hélio Castroneves (in his 200th career start for Team Penske), and Kimball rounded out the top ten. Behind J. R. Hildebrand in 11th and Mike Conway in 12th, Power struggled with grip as he was the first driver to qualify and took 13th. The remaining top-20 positions were occupied by Alex Lloyd, Patrick, Alex Tagliani, E. J. Viso, Scheckter, Vítor Meira, and James Jakes. Ana Beatriz and Marco Andretti took the next two positions. Despite Rahal's notable pace in practice, a near-spin in turn one on his first lap caused him to lose his speed and start 23rd. Sebastián Saavedra in 24th, Carpenter in 25th, and Simona de Silvestro in 26th completed the starting grid for the race.

=== Qualifying classification ===
Final qualifying results
Pos	No.	Driver	Team	Lap 1	Lap 2	Total	Grid
1	10	(United Kingdom) Dario Franchitti	Chip Ganassi Racing	21.6008	21.5968	43.1976	1
2	2	(Spain) Oriol Servià	Newman/Haas Racing	21.7374	21.7175	43.4549	2
3	82	(Brazil) Tony Kanaan	KV Racing Technology – Lotus	21.7417	21.7473	43.4890	3
4	06	(Canada) James Hinchcliffe	Newman/Haas Racing	21.7476	21.7692	43.5168	4
5	28	(United States) Ryan Hunter-Reay	Andretti Autosport	21.7481	21.7738	43.5219	5
6	6	(Australia) Ryan Briscoe	Team Penske	21.7978	21.7546	43.5524	6
7	9	(New Zealand) Scott Dixon	Chip Ganassi Racing	21.8215	21.8176	43.6391	7
8	5	(Japan) Takuma Sato	KV Racing Technology – Lotus	21.8201	21.8372	43.6573	8
9	3	(Brazil) Hélio Castroneves	Team Penske	21.8755	21.8226	43.6981	9
10	83	(United States) Charlie Kimball	Chip Ganassi Racing	21.9488	21.8667	43.8155	10
11	4	(United States) J. R. Hildebrand	Panther Racing	22.0255	21.8909	43.9164	11
12	27	(United Kingdom) Mike Conway	Andretti Autosport	21.9883	21.9789	43.9672	12
13	12	(Australia) Will Power	Team Penske	22.1838	22.0048	44.1886	13
14	19	(United Kingdom) Alex Lloyd	Dale Coyne Racing	22.1818	22.0424	44.2242	14
15	7	(United States) Danica Patrick	Andretti Autosport	22.1790	22.0566	44.2356	15
16	77	(Canada) Alex Tagliani	Sam Schmidt Motorsports	22.1499	22.0922	44.2421	16
17	59	(Venezuela) E. J. Viso	KV Racing Technology – Lotus	22.2031	22.1117	44.3148	17
18	22	(South Africa) Tomas Scheckter	Dreyer & Reinbold Racing	22.1879	22.1682	44.3561	18
19	14	(Brazil) Vítor Meira	A. J. Foyt Enterprises	22.1255	22.2646	44.3901	19
20	18	(United Kingdom) James Jakes	Dale Coyne Racing	22.3455	22.3101	44.6556	20
21	24	(Brazil) Ana Beatriz	Dreyer & Reinbold Racing	22.5810	22.1577	44.7387	21
22	26	(United States) Marco Andretti	Andretti Autosport	22.4444	22.3583	44.8027	22
23	38	(United States) Graham Rahal	Chip Ganassi Racing	22.7185	22.3320	45.0505	23
24	34	(Colombia) Sebastián Saavedra	Conquest Racing	22.7469	22.7286	45.4755	24
25	67	(United States) Ed Carpenter	Sarah Fisher Racing	22.9183	22.7121	45.6304	25
26	78	(Switzerland) Simona de Silvestro	HVM Racing	23.5694	23.3064	46.8758	26
27	30	(United Kingdom) Pippa Mann	Rahal Letterman Lanigan Racing	—	—	No time	27^{1}

Notes

- ^1 — Pippa Mann was withdrawn from the race because of an accident in the final practice session which resulted in her sustaining several injuries.

== Warm-up ==
A warm-up session was held on Sunday at 10:15 a.m. Eastern Daylight Time (UTC−04:00) to allow teams to make their final preparations for the race. The session was intended to last 30 minutes, but was extended to 40 minutes because of a large amount of oil that Castroneves' car expelled onto the track. Scheckter also hit debris on-track and suffered damage to his car. Dixon led the session with a time of 22.3638 seconds, ahead of Franchitti, Rahal, Hunter-Reay, and Servià.

== Race ==
The race was televised live on ABC in the United States. Weather conditions at the start of the race were cloudy and overcast, with air temperatures ranging from 77 to 88 °F (25 to 31 °C) and track temperatures from 73 to 75 °F (23 to 24 °C). During pre-race ceremonies, a moment of silence was observed in honor of concertgoers who were killed or injured due to a stage collapse at the Indiana State Fair on August 13. MoveThatBlock.com co-founders Todd Drowlette and Patrick Gray and president Tom Amell commanded the drivers to start their engines. The race was originally scheduled to begin at 4:00 p.m., but impending rainfall caused IndyCar officials to push the start of the race up to 3:50 p.m. Utilizing the outside line, Franchitti led the field to the green flag and pulled ahead of Servià in turn one. Entering the back stretch, Conway accelerated too quickly for his cold tires and spun out. Rahal, with no time to react, slammed into the right side of Conway's car. Andretti also damaged his suspension when he hit the wall while trying to avoid Conway. The crash prompted the first caution flag of the race.

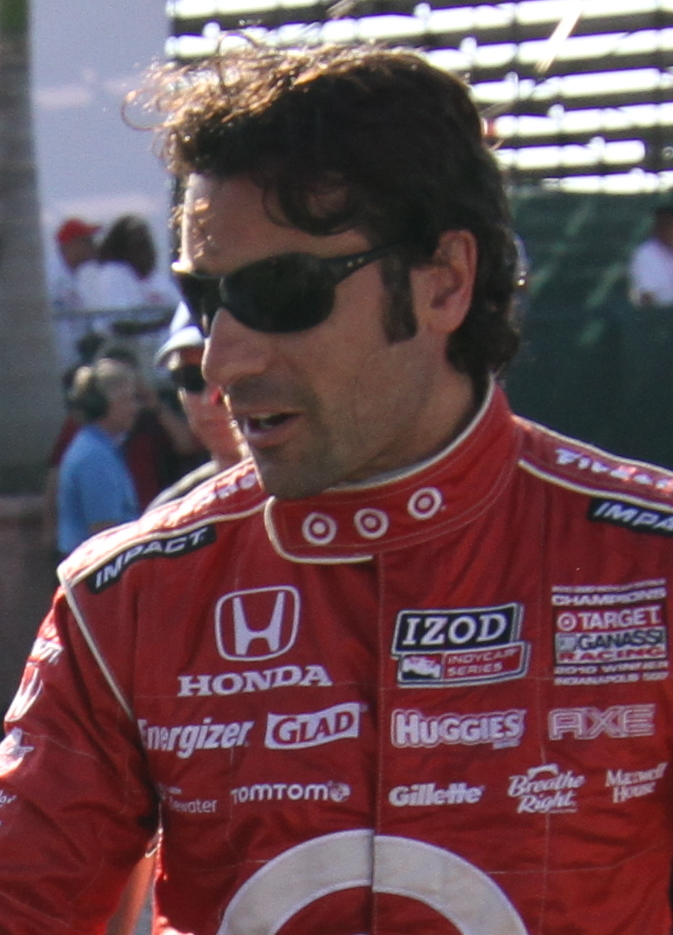
Dario Franchitti (pictured in 2011) crashed after leading 115 laps, the most of anyone in the race.

Franchitti continued leading at the restart on lap seven. The second caution was issued a lap later when Castroneves spun into the left-side guard rail at the exit of turn two. His car sustained right-rear suspension damage, but unlike Conway and Rahal, he was able to continue. By the time the caution had flown, Scheckter had already improved from 18th to sixth place. During the ensuing restart on lap 12, Scheckter overtook Kanaan, Hunter-Reay, and Hinchcliffe, moving up to third place. Six laps later, Hinchcliffe successfully reeled in Scheckter and got by him for third in turn three. On lap 21, Castroneves rejoined the race in 24th, 12 laps behind the leader, after his team made repairs to his car. Scheckter then lost the fourth position to Hunter-Reay on the 25th lap, and later fell behind Sato and Kanaan. By the 30th lap, Franchitti widened his lead over Servià to five seconds. Eight laps later, Servià was nearly passed by Hunter-Reay on the front stretch, but managed to defend his position on the outside line. Hinchcliffe used his push-to-pass system to overtake Hunter-Reay for third on lap 41, and Servià for second five laps later. On the 53rd lap, Hunter-Reay nearly collided into Sato in turn one and resultantly ceded his fourth position.

Franchitti continued his dominance in the race, garnering a 6.6-second lead over Hinchcliffe by lap 67. The following lap, Briscoe passed Dixon for seventh place on the front stretch. Hinchcliffe kicked off the first cycle of green-flag pit stops on the 70th lap. Franchitti made his stop three laps later, handing the lead to Briscoe until lap 75. The third caution was issued that same lap because of light drizzles over the track. The drivers paced under the caution for 32 laps as the track gradually dried up. Franchitti led at the lap-107 restart, followed by Sato, Servià, Hunter-Reay, and Hinchcliffe. Three laps later, Scheckter and Kanaan attempted to get by the lapped Andretti in the second turn, with Scheckter taking the high line and Kanaan the low line. Andretti and Scheckter made contact, sending the latter spinning down the track, directly into the path of Kanaan. The two drivers slid into the back stretch tire barriers, causing Kanaan to flip upside-down. Andretti was also forced to retire because of exacerbated suspension issues. None of the drivers involved were injured. A porta-potty leaning on the inside wall within the track's infield was knocked over by Kanaan, though no one was inside it at the time.

During the restart on lap 118, leaders Franchitti and Sato collided on the front stretch, which caused Franchitti to spin into the inside wall. Sato damaged his right-front tire and front wing but was able to drive back to pit road and rejoin the race in eighth, whereas Franchitti's damage forced him to retire from the race, his first DNF result since the 2009 RoadRunner Turbo Indy 300 at Kansas Speedway. Behind them, Hildebrand collided with the side of Viso's car and also hit the inside wall, which prematurely ended his race. Green-flag racing resumed on lap 125, now with Hunter-Reay, Servià, Dixon, Hinchcliffe, and Briscoe in the top-five. By the 134th lap, Patrick passed Briscoe for fifth, while Power pulled ahead of Hinchcliffe for fourth place. Six laps later, Hinchcliffe reclaimed fourth from Power. As Tagliani's team completed a pit stop on lap 141, his car's exhaust suddenly burst into flames, forcing him to evacuate his car. No caution was issued for the incident. On the 149th lap, Patrick overtook Power for fifth place, while Dixon set the fastest lap time of the race at 22.3481 seconds. Patrick then pitted on lap 162, thus beginning green-flag pit stops for the second time. When Hunter-Reay made his stop on lap 164, Dixon assumed the lead for the next two laps. Power was handed the lead after Dixon pitted and remained on-track until lap 179. Because of the extra fuel he received during repairs for his earlier incident, Sato took the lead for 13 laps before giving the lead back to Hunter-Reay as he made his last pit stop.

== Race finish controversy ==
The 0.5-second lead that Hunter-Reay amassed over Servià was diminished when the sixth caution was necessitated for light rain showers on lap 206. A planned restart on the 217th lap was called off by IndyCar officials because the drivers were not lined up properly. During the caution period, the rain continued dampening the track at a faster rate, and numerous drivers demanded through radio communications that the race be stopped entirely rather than restarted. Despite their pleas, however, the race resumed on lap 218. Patrick immediately lost control of her car and spun on the front stretch. Power and Sato both spun out while trying to avoid Patrick, and Carpenter contacted the right side of Power's car. Beatriz also sustained slight damage to her car. Three seconds after the accident, IndyCar's automatic Track Condition Radio system issued the caution, by which point Servià had already passed Hunter-Reay for the lead because Hunter-Reay lost grip within his tires. Dixon also overtook Hunter-Reay for second place when they crossed the start/finish line. Although Servià was initially scored as the leader, he was placed in the second position by officials on lap 220, behind Hunter-Reay, when the red flag was thrown to stop the race.

After several minutes of deliberation among the officials, the race was declared over, and the running order on lap 215 (prior to the final restart) was recognized as the finishing results. Hunter-Reay was thus declared the winner, the fifth victory of his career, his first of the season, and his first on an oval track since the 2004 Time Warner Cable Road Runner 250 at the Milwaukee Mile. Servià finished in second, Dixon third, Hinchcliffe fourth, and Power fifth, while Patrick, Sato, Briscoe, Kimball, and Meira rounded out the top ten. The final classified finishers were Carpenter, Viso, Lloyd, Beatriz, Saavedra, de Silvestro, and Castroneves.

=== Criticism of Brian Barnhart ===
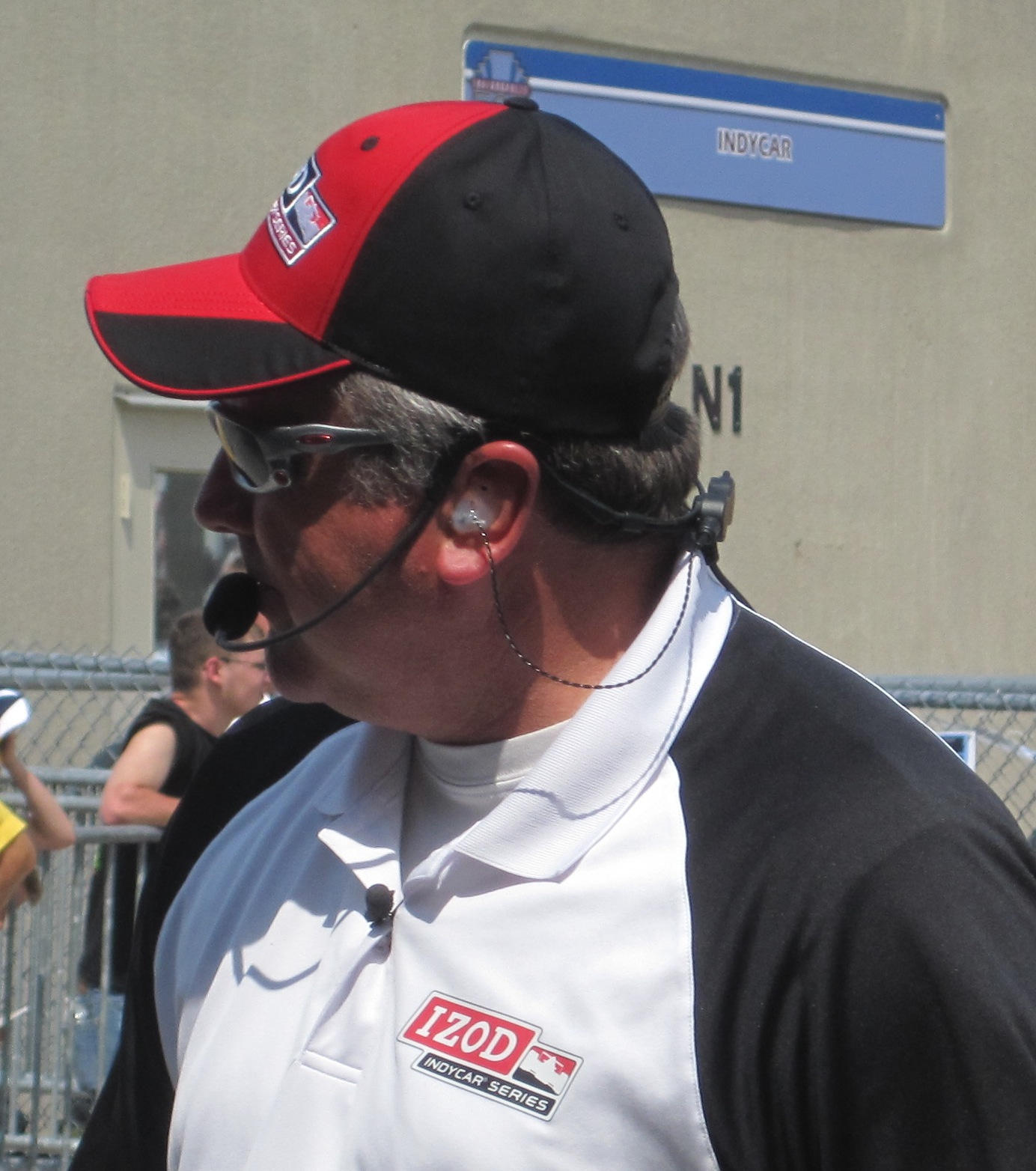
Brian Barnhart (pictured in 2010) was largely criticized for his decision to continue the race in rainy conditions.

Brian Barnhart, who had served as the IndyCar Series' race director since 1997, was blamed by many drivers, owners, and fans of the IndyCar Series for allowing the race to continue despite the obviously unsafe track conditions. Barnhart had previously been criticized by veteran racers such as Servià and Justin Wilson for his mandate of single-file starts in oval races and his inconsistent penalties handed to drivers. Andretti Autosport owner Michael Andretti commented on the ABC broadcast: "This is the worst officiating I’ve ever seen. I’m really, really disappointed. Normally Brian does a great job but this time he really missed it." Hunter-Reay, Patrick, and KV Racing Technology co-owner Jimmy Vasser also voiced their disapproval of the decision to restart the race.

After an incensed Power hopped out of his damaged car, he ran into the infield and confronted Charles Burns, one of the pit officials. His team members managed to calm him down, but not before he displayed his two middle fingers in front of the ABC cameras; the gesture went viral on the internet. In an interview with pit reporter Jamie Little, Power stated that he and other drivers were "begging them, begging them, 'please do not go green'" because "the track was in no condition to restart." When asked if he wanted to speak to Barnhart about the finish, Power said: "There's no use. He makes such bad calls all the time. This has got to be it. They cannot have the guy running the show, because that was the decision that put a lot of drivers in danger and you saw how many people crashed on the front straight. Shame on him. I just can't believe they make decisions like that." On August 25, IndyCar placed Power on probation for the rest of the season and fined him US$30,000 for "displaying unsportsmanlike conduct," though he was able to reduce the fine by participating in public appearances on behalf of the sanctioning body.

In a post-race press conference, Barnhart took responsibility for letting the race resume, but insisted that none of the officials on pit road or the race observers around the track relayed any of the objections from the drivers: "We didn't have anybody saying that. So combined with a lack of information from people saying we shouldn't go, combined with all of our track safety people saying we should go and all the observers around say the track is still raceable and going, you make the decision based on that information. And, like I say, clearly it was the wrong one to make." Veteran American open-wheel car racing journalist Robin Miller expressed skepticism in Barnhart's claims, writing in an article for the Speed Channel: "Really? The control freak who screams at drivers incessantly during a race didn’t have any way of hearing from them? Nobody in Race Control got any warnings from the teams? The spotters and team managers weren’t bitching? Nobody in Race Control looked at any of the in-car cameras to check the intensity of the rain?" Miller also listed off several members of the sport that he felt were worthy of taking Barnhart's position, including Indy Lights chief steward Tony Cotman and four-time Indianapolis 500 winner Rick Mears.

=== Protest by Chip Ganassi Racing and Newman/Haas Racing ===
The decision to revert the running order of the race infuriated Servià, who said: "I think it was really wet out there and we shouldn't have gone out, but they threw the green and I was ahead when the yellow went out. Any racing, even here, when you call the leader that is the way it stands. They called me the leader and then they decide to reverse it. I am very upset. Race control called leader car No. 2 and that is when the yellow came, we were ahead." He likened himself to Paul Tracy, who lost the 2002 Indianapolis 500 because of controversial officiating by Barnhart. Dixon was similarly frustrated with the call: "This isn’t a USAC dirt race, we don’t revert back to the last lap, but I wonder why we even have a rule book. I don’t know if I’m at a go-kart race or what because they make (rules) up as they go." Marshall Pruett of the Speed Channel also argued that Servià should have won on the basis of several rules in the IndyCar Series rulebook, including:

- Rule 7.2.B.1: "The electronic scoring system is the primary scoring record. IndyCar will record the physical sequence in which each car crosses the start/finish line, including in pit lane. At oval events, the serial scoring system is a backup scoring record."
- Rule 7.2.C: "Start/Finish Line - The scoring of cars shall begin at the moment when the timing transponder of the lead car reaches the starting line and the declaration of the green or yellow condition has been given by the Senior Official."
- Rule 7.2.D.1: "A car will be credited with a lap when its timing transponder crosses the start/finish line after completing one entire lap of the track with two wheels of the car having remained on the racing surface at all times, as determined from the scoring records."

Dixon and Servià's respective teams, Chip Ganassi Racing and Newman/Haas Racing, lodged protests against the official race result no less than 30 minutes after it was released by IndyCar. Barnhart agreed to move forward with the protests and scheduled a private hearing in Indianapolis, Indiana on August 23. The three-man panel that determined the validity of the protests was composed of Jerry Gappens, USAC chairman Jeff Stoops, and former USAC president Rollie Helmling. Andretti Autosport, Hunter-Reay's team, also attended the hearing. The finishing result was ultimately upheld by the jury because they ruled that Barnhart "had the authority under the governing 2011 IZOD IndyCar Series rulebook to render the decision that was made." Newman/Haas Racing co-owner Carl Haas was grateful that IndyCar let them plead their case, but was disappointed that the proof they provided was not sufficient to convince the jury to award Servià the win.

=== Aftermath ===
Franchitti maintained his Drivers' Championship lead with 443 points, but the gap between him and Power decreased to 47 points as a result of his lap-118 crash. Dixon, on 370 points, held third place, while Servià's 308 points earned him fourth in the standings ahead of Kanaan with 295, as five races remained in the season.

Randy Bernard remained supportive of Barnhart on the weekend of the series' next race, the Indy Grand Prix of Sonoma, stating in a press conference that he appreciated how Barnhart handled the finish of the race. However, he revealed that an evaluation of the series' rules would occur after the 2011 season ended. In November 2011, Barnhart was let go from his position as the series' race director, though he still served as the president of operations. Beaux Barfield, who had been the race director of the American Le Mans Series since 2008, replaced Barnhart two months later.

Jerry Gappens stated that the race needed to draw at least 35,000 to 40,000 spectators to be viable to New Hampshire Motor Speeedway in the future. However, only 28,000 fans attended the race, falling short of Gappens' hopes and causing a fiscal loss of nearly seven figures, according to racing insiders. As a result, the track was dropped from the IndyCar Series' schedule in 2012 and has not returned as of 2026.

=== Race classification ===
Final race results
Pos	No.	Driver	Team	Laps	Time/Retired	Grid	Laps Led	Points
1	28	(United States) Ryan Hunter-Reay	Andretti Autosport	215	01:58:01.5843	5	71	50
2	2	(Spain) Oriol Servià	Newman/Haas Racing	215	01:58:01.8204	2	0	40
3	9	(New Zealand) Scott Dixon	Chip Ganassi Racing	215	01:58:03.0682	7	2	35
4	06	(Canada) James Hinchcliffe	Newman/Haas Racing	215	01:58:03.7593	4	0	32
5	12	(Australia) Will Power	Team Penske	215	01:58:04.4093	13	12	30
6	7	(United States) Danica Patrick	Andretti Autosport	215	01:58:05.2016	15	0	28
7	5	(Japan) Takuma Sato	KV Racing Technology – Lotus	215	01:58:05.7017	8	13	26
8	6	(Australia) Ryan Briscoe	Team Penske	214	+1 lap	6	2	24
9	83	(United States) Charlie Kimball	Chip Ganassi Racing	213	+2 laps	13	0	22
10	14	(Brazil) Vítor Meira	A. J. Foyt Enterprises	212	+3 laps	19	0	20
11	67	(United States) Ed Carpenter	Sarah Fisher Racing	212	+3 laps	25	0	19
12	59	(Venezuela) E. J. Viso	KV Racing Technology – Lotus	212	+3 laps	17	0	18
13	19	(United Kingdom) Alex Lloyd	Dale Coyne Racing	211	+4 laps	14	0	17
14	24	(Brazil) Ana Beatriz	Dreyer & Reinbold Racing	210	+5 laps	21	0	16
15	34	(Colombia) Sebastián Saavedra	Conquest Racing	210	+5 laps	24	0	15
16	78	(Switzerland) Simona de Silvestro	HVM Racing	209	+6 laps	26	0	14
17	3	(Brazil) Hélio Castroneves	Team Penske	202	+13 laps	9	0	13
18	18	(United Kingdom) James Jakes	Dale Coyne Racing	176	Mechanical	20	0	12
19	77	(Canada) Alex Tagliani	Sam Schmidt Motorsports	137	Mechanical	16	0	12
20	10	(United Kingdom) Dario Franchitti	Chip Ganassi Racing	118	Contact	1	115	15^{1}^{2}
21	4	(United States) J. R. Hildebrand	Panther Racing	118	Contact	11	0	12
22	82	(Brazil) Tony Kanaan	KV Racing Technology – Lotus	109	Contact	3	0	12
23	22	(South Africa) Tomas Scheckter	Dreyer & Reinbold Racing	109	Contact	18	0	12
24	26	(United States) Marco Andretti	Andretti Autosport	109	Contact	22	0	12
25	27	(United Kingdom) Mike Conway	Andretti Autosport	0	Contact	12	0	10
26	38	(United States) Graham Rahal	Chip Ganassi Racing	0	Contact	23	0	10
27	30	(United Kingdom) Pippa Mann	Rahal Letterman Lanigan Racing	0	Did not start	27	0	5

Notes

- ^1 — Includes one bonus point for being the fastest qualifier.
- ^2 — Includes two bonus points for leading the most laps.

== Championship standings after the race ==
Drivers' Championship standings
+/-	Pos.	Driver	Points
Unchanged	1	(United Kingdom) Dario Franchitti	443
Unchanged	2	(Australia) Will Power	396 (–47)
Unchanged	3	(New Zealand) Scott Dixon	370 (–73)
1	4	(Spain) Oriol Servià	308 (–135)
1	5	(Brazil) Tony Kanaan	295 (–148)

- Note: Only the top five positions are included.

Previous race: 2011 Honda Indy 200	IndyCar Series; 2011 season	Next race: 2011 Indy Grand Prix of Sonoma
Previous race: 1998 New England 200	New Hampshire Indy 225	Next race: —
