= 2012 Iowa Corn Indy 250 =

(United States) 2012 Iowa Corn Indy 250
Race details
- 9th round of the 2012 IndyCar Series season
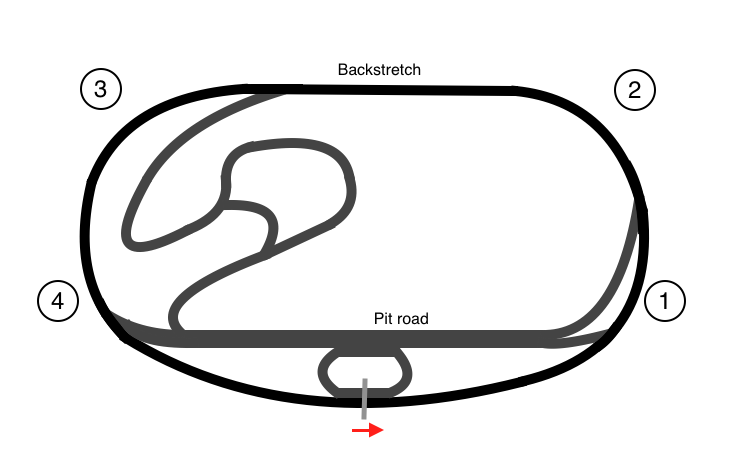
- Date: June 23, 2012
- Official name: Iowa Corn Indy 250
- Location: Iowa Speedway
- Course: Permanent racing facility 0.875 mi / 1.4 km
- Distance: 250 laps 218.75 mi / 352.044 km
- Weather: Temperatures reaching up to 86 °F (30 °C); wind speeds up to 11.1 miles per hour (17.9 km/h)

Pole position
- Driver: (United Kingdom) Dario Franchitti (Chip Ganassi Racing)
- Time: 9:16.9203 (Won 30-lap heat race)

Podium
- First: (United States) Ryan Hunter-Reay (Andretti Autosport)
- Second: (United States) Marco Andretti (Andretti Autosport)
- Third: (Brazil) Tony Kanaan (KV Racing Technology)

The 2012 Iowa Corn Indy 250 was the sixth running of the Iowa Corn Indy 250 and the ninth round of the 2012 IndyCar Series season.

It took place on Saturday, June 23, 2012. The race was contested for 250 laps at 0.875-mile (1.408 km) Iowa Speedway in Newton, Iowa, and was televised by NBC Sports in the United States.

Pole sitter Dario Franchitti of Chip Ganassi Racing fell out of the race before the green flag due to engine failure. Ryan Hunter-Reay of Andretti Autosport won the race, his second consecutive win of the season.

The weather at this event reached up to 86 °F or 30 °C; almost becoming too hot to grow the corn that would make up the ethanol fuel for the drivers.

Previous race: 2012 Milwaukee IndyFest	IZOD IndyCar Series; 2012 season	Next race: 2012 Honda Indy Toronto
Previous race: 2011 Iowa Corn Indy 250	Iowa Corn Indy 250	Next race: 2013 Iowa Corn Indy 250
