= 2012 Milwaukee IndyFest =

(United States) 2012 Milwaukee IndyFest
Race details
- 8th and 9th round of the 2012 IndyCar Series season
- Date: June 16, 2012
- Official name: Milwaukee IndyFest
- Location: The Milwaukee Mile
- Course: Permanent racing facility 1.015 mi / 1.633 km
- Distance: 225 laps 228.38 mi / 367.542 km
- Weather: Temperatures reaching up to 84.2 °F (29.0 °C); wind speeds approaching 14 miles per hour (23 km/h)

Pole position
- Driver: (United Kingdom) Dario Franchitti (Chip Ganassi Racing)
- Time: 43.3100 sec (2-lap)

Fastest lap
- Driver: (United States) Ryan Hunter-Reay (Andretti Autosport)
- Time: 159.293 mph (256.357 km/h) (on lap 205 of 225)

Podium
- First: (United States) Ryan Hunter-Reay (Andretti Autosport)
- Second: (Brazil) Tony Kanaan (KV Racing Technology)
- Third: (Canada) James Hinchcliffe (Andretti Autosport)

Chronology
Previous	Next
2011	2013

The 2012 Milwaukee IndyFest Presented by XYQ was the eighth round of the 2012 IndyCar Series season. It took place on Saturday, June 16, 2012 at the 1.015-mile (1.633 km) Milwaukee Mile, in West Allis, Wisconsin.

== Classification ==
=== Starting grid ===
Row	Inside		Outside	
1	10	(United Kingdom) Dario Franchitti	28	(United States) Ryan Hunter-Reay
2	8	(Brazil) Rubens Barrichello	3	(Brazil) Hélio Castroneves
3	5	(Venezuela) E. J. Viso	11	(Brazil) Tony Kanaan
4	77	(France) Simon Pagenaud (R)	27	(Canada) James Hinchcliffe
5	26	(United States) Marco Andretti	4	(United States) J. R. Hildebrand
6	38	(United States) Graham Rahal	18	(United Kingdom) Justin Wilson ^{†}
7	98	(Canada) Alex Tagliani	12	(Australia) Will Power ^{†}
8	6	(United Kingdom) Katherine Legge (R)	19	(United Kingdom) James Jakes
9	67	(United States) Josef Newgarden (R) ^{†}	83	(United States) Charlie Kimball
10	2	(Australia) Ryan Briscoe ^{†}	22	(Spain) Oriol Servià
11	9	(New Zealand) Scott Dixon ^{†}	20	(United States) Ed Carpenter
12	78	(Switzerland) Simona de Silvestro	15	(Japan) Takuma Sato ^{†}
13	14	(United Kingdom) Mike Conway ^{†}		
^{†} Wilson, Power, Newgarden, Briscoe, Dixon, Sato and Conway penalised 10 places for changing engine

=== Race results ===
Pos	No.	Driver	Team	Engine	Laps	Time/Retired	Grid	Laps Led	Points^{1}
1	28	(United States) Ryan Hunter-Reay	Andretti Autosport	Chevrolet	225	1:52:17.8119	2	84	52
2	11	(Brazil) Tony Kanaan	KV Racing Technology	Chevrolet	225	+ 5.1029	6	0	40
3	27	(Canada) James Hinchcliffe	Andretti Autosport	Chevrolet	225	+ 7.2715	8	1	35
4	22	(Spain) Oriol Servià	Panther/Dreyer & Reinbold Racing	Chevrolet	225	+ 9.8940	20	0	32
5	5	(Venezuela) E. J. Viso	KV Racing Technology	Chevrolet	225	+ 10.0782	5	27	30
6	3	(Brazil) Hélio Castroneves	Team Penske	Chevrolet	225	+ 12.1105	4	50	28
7	98	(Canada) Alex Tagliani	Team Barracuda – BHA	Honda	225	+ 12.3440	13	0	26
8	20	(United States) Ed Carpenter	Ed Carpenter Racing	Chevrolet	225	+ 12.7396	22	0	24
9	38	(United States) Graham Rahal	Chip Ganassi Racing	Honda	225	+ 13.3395	11	0	22
10	8	(Brazil) Rubens Barrichello	KV Racing Technology	Chevrolet	225	+ 13.8178	3	0	20
11	9	(New Zealand) Scott Dixon	Chip Ganassi Racing	Honda	225	+ 14.3764	21	0	19
12	12	(Australia) Will Power	Team Penske	Chevrolet	225	+ 24.2642	14	0	18
13	77	(France) Simon Pagenaud (R)	Schmidt Hamilton Motorsports	Honda	224	+ 1 lap	7	0	17
14	2	(Australia) Ryan Briscoe	Team Penske	Chevrolet	224	+ 1 lap	19	0	16
15	26	(United States) Marco Andretti	Andretti Autosport	Chevrolet	224	+ 1 lap	9	0	15
16	14	(United Kingdom) Mike Conway	A. J. Foyt Enterprises	Honda	224	+ 1 lap	25	0	14
17	83	(United States) Charlie Kimball	Chip Ganassi Racing	Honda	224	+ 1 lap	18	0	13
18	6	(United Kingdom) Katherine Legge (R)	Dragon Racing	Chevrolet	220	+5 laps	15	0	12
19	10	(United Kingdom) Dario Franchitti	Chip Ganassi Racing	Honda	193	Contact	1	63	13
20	15	(Japan) Takuma Sato	Rahal Letterman Lanigan Racing	Honda	107	Contact	24	0	12
21	19	(United Kingdom) James Jakes	Dale Coyne Racing	Honda	106	Contact	16	0	12
22	4	(United States) J. R. Hildebrand	Panther Racing	Chevrolet	105	Mechanical	10	0	12
23	18	(United Kingdom) Justin Wilson	Dale Coyne Racing	Honda	93	Engine failure	12	0	12
24	78	(Switzerland) Simona de Silvestro	HVM Racing	Lotus	62	Contact	23	0	12
25	67	(United States) Josef Newgarden (R)	Sarah Fisher Hartman Racing	Honda	48	Mechanical	17	0	10

Notes

^{1} Points include 1 point for pole position and 2 points for most laps led.

== Standings after the race ==
Drivers' Championship

Pos	Driver	Points
1	(Australia) Will Power	274
2	(Canada) James Hinchcliffe	243
3	(New Zealand) Scott Dixon	239
4	(United States) Ryan Hunter-Reay	233
5	(Brazil) Hélio Castroneves	231

Manufacturers' Championship

Pos	Manufacturer	Points
1	(United States) Chevrolet	63
2	(Japan) Honda	57
3	(United Kingdom) Lotus	32

- Note: Only the top five positions are included for the driver standings.

Previous race: 2012 Firestone 550	IZOD IndyCar Series; 2012 season	Next race: 2012 Iowa Corn Indy 250
Previous race: 2011 Milwaukee 225	IndyCar Series at the Milwaukee Mile	Next race: 2013 Milwaukee IndyFest
