= 2012 Honda Indy Toronto =

2012 IndyCar Series event held in Toronto, Ontario, Canada

(Canada) 2012 Honda Indy Toronto
Race details
- 9th round of the 2012 IndyCar Series season
- Date: July 8, 2012
- Official name: Honda Indy Toronto
- Location: Streets of Toronto
- Course: Temporary street circuit 1.755 mi / 2.824 km
- Distance: 85 laps 149.175 mi / 240.074 km
- Weather: Temperatures reaching up to 27.8 °C (82.0 °F); with temperatures dropping slightly to 24 °C (75 °F) by the end of the event

Pole position
- Driver: (United Kingdom) Dario Franchitti (Chip Ganassi Racing)
- Time: 59.3510 sec

Fastest lap
- Driver: (United States) Josef Newgarden (Sarah Fisher Hartman Racing)
- Time: 60.0639 sec (on lap 62 of 85)

Podium
- First: (United States) Ryan Hunter-Reay (Andretti Autosport)
- Second: (United States) Charlie Kimball (Chip Ganassi Racing)
- Third: (United Kingdom) Mike Conway (A. J. Foyt Enterprises)

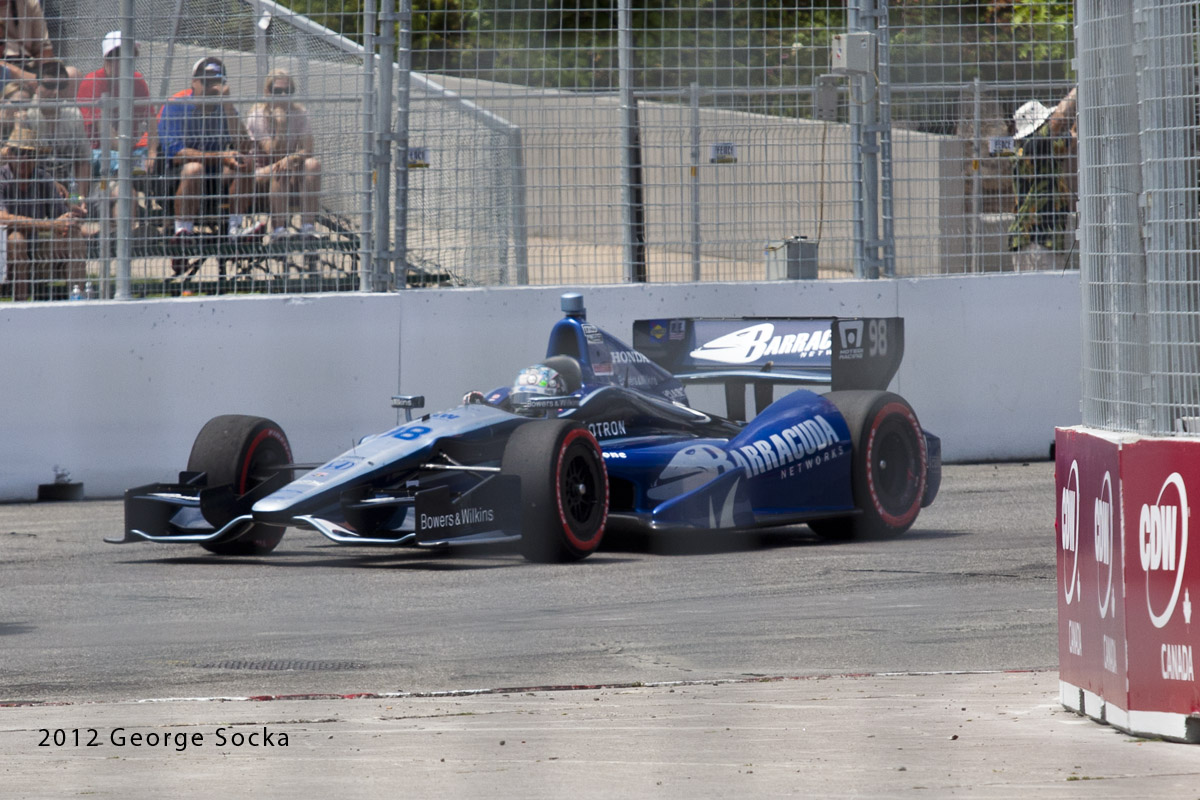
Canadian Alex Tagliani driving the Barracuda car

The 2012 Honda Indy Toronto was the tenth round of the 2012 IndyCar Series season. It took place on Sunday, July 8, 2012. The race was contested over 85 laps at the 1.755-mile (2.824 km) street course at Exhibition Place in Toronto, Ontario, Canada. Ryan Hunter-Reay of Andretti Autosport won the race, his third consecutive win of the season, which also gave him the series' points lead.

With his victory, Hunter-Reay became the first American driver to win three races in a row since A. J. Allmendinger in 2006, and the first American to lead the driver's points championship since Sam Hornish Jr., also in 2006. Toronto was Dario Franchitti fourth pole position of the year, but he had bad luck in one of his pitstops when he stopped too far from the refuelling device and then later a collision with Ryan Briscoe, he finished the race in 17th position.

== Classification ==
=== Starting grid ===
Row	Inside		Outside	
1	10	(United Kingdom) Dario Franchitti	12	(Australia) Will Power
2	18	(United Kingdom) Justin Wilson	7	(France) Sébastien Bourdais
3	9	(New Zealand) Scott Dixon	28	(United States) Ryan Hunter-Reay
4	3	(Brazil) Hélio Castroneves	77	(France) Simon Pagenaud (R)
5	15	(Japan) Takuma Sato	38	(United States) Graham Rahal
6	14	(United Kingdom) Mike Conway	2	(Australia) Ryan Briscoe
7	83	(United States) Charlie Kimball	22	(Spain) Oriol Servià
8	4	(United States) J. R. Hildebrand	98	(Canada) Alex Tagliani ^{†}
9	11	(Brazil) Tony Kanaan	8	(Brazil) Rubens Barrichello
10	27	(Canada) James Hinchcliffe ^{†}	67	(United States) Josef Newgarden (R)
11	20	(United States) Ed Carpenter	26	(United States) Marco Andretti
12	5	(Venezuela) E. J. Viso	19	(United Kingdom) James Jakes ^{†}
13	78	(Switzerland) Simona de Silvestro ^{†}		
^{†} Tagliani, Hinchcliffe, Jakes and de Silvestro penalised 10 places for changing engine

=== Race results ===
Pos	No.	Driver	Team	Engine	Laps	Time/Retired	Grid	Laps Led	Points^{1}
1	28	(United States) Ryan Hunter-Reay	Andretti Autosport	Chevrolet	85	1:33:26.5096	6	36	52
2	83	(United States) Charlie Kimball	Chip Ganassi Racing	Honda	85	+ 0.0757^{†}	13	0	40
3	14	(United Kingdom) Mike Conway	A. J. Foyt Enterprises	Honda	85	+ 0.2848	11	0	35
4	11	(Brazil) Tony Kanaan	KV Racing Technology	Chevrolet	85	+ 1.6672	17	0	32
5	22	(Spain) Oriol Servià	Panther/Dreyer & Reinbold Racing	Chevrolet	85	+ 1.9128	14	0	30
6	3	(Brazil) Hélio Castroneves	Team Penske	Chevrolet	85	+ 2.4795	7	0	28
7	4	(United States) J. R. Hildebrand	Panther Racing	Chevrolet	85	+ 2.6233	15	1	26
8	19	(United Kingdom) James Jakes	Dale Coyne Racing	Honda	85	+ 3.7294	24	0	24
9	15	(Japan) Takuma Sato	Rahal Letterman Lanigan Racing	Honda	85	+ 6.5633	9	0	22
10	98	(Canada) Alex Tagliani	Team Barracuda – BHA	Honda	85	+ 9.9764	16	0	20
11	8	(Brazil) Rubens Barrichello	KV Racing Technology	Chevrolet	85	+ 11.4636	18	0	19
12	77	(France) Simon Pagenaud (R)	Schmidt Hamilton Motorsports	Honda	85	+ 43.8734^{‡}	8	23	18
13	67	(United States) Josef Newgarden (R)	Sarah Fisher Hartman Racing	Honda	84	+ 1 lap	20	0	17
14	7	(France) Sébastien Bourdais	Dragon Racing	Chevrolet	84	+ 1 lap	4	0	16
15	12	(Australia) Will Power	Team Penske	Chevrolet	84	+ 1 lap	2	20	15
16	26	(United States) Marco Andretti	Andretti Autosport	Chevrolet	84	+ 1 lap	22	0	14
17	10	(United Kingdom) Dario Franchitti	Chip Ganassi Racing	Honda	84	+ 1 lap	1	5	14
18	20	(United States) Ed Carpenter	Ed Carpenter Racing	Chevrolet	84	+ 1 lap	21	0	12
19	2	(Australia) Ryan Briscoe	Team Penske	Chevrolet	83	+ 2 laps	12	0	12
20	5	(Venezuela) E. J. Viso	KV Racing Technology	Chevrolet	81	+ 4 laps	23	0	12
21	18	(United Kingdom) Justin Wilson	Dale Coyne Racing	Honda	67	Contact	3	0	12
22	27	(Canada) James Hinchcliffe	Andretti Autosport	Chevrolet	33	Mechanical	19	0	12
23	38	(United States) Graham Rahal	Chip Ganassi Racing	Honda	23	Contact	10	0	12
24	78	(Switzerland) Simona de Silvestro	HVM Racing	Lotus	9	Mechanical	25	0	12
25	9	(New Zealand) Scott Dixon	Chip Ganassi Racing	Honda	7	Engine	5	0	10
^{†} Under caution^{‡} Pagenaud penalised 30 seconds for blocking
OFFICIAL BOX SCORE

Notes

^{1} Points include 1 point for pole position and 2 points for most laps led.

== Standings after the race ==
Drivers' Championship

Pos	Driver	Points
1	(United States) Ryan Hunter-Reay	335
2	(Australia) Will Power	301
3	(Brazil) Hélio Castroneves	289
4	(New Zealand) Scott Dixon	281
5	(Canada) James Hinchcliffe	268

Manufacturers' Championship

Pos	Manufacturer	Points
1	(United States) Chevrolet	81
2	(Japan) Honda	69
3	(United Kingdom) Lotus	40

- Note: Only the top five positions are included for the driver standings.

Previous race: 2012 Iowa Corn Indy 250	IndyCar Series; 2012 season	Next race: 2012 Edmonton Indy
Previous race: 2011 Honda Indy Toronto	Honda Indy Toronto	Next race: 2013 Honda Indy Toronto
