= 2012 Edmonton Indy =

(Canada) 2012 Edmonton Indy
Race details
- 9th round of the 2012 IndyCar Series season
- Date: July 22, 2012
- Official name: Edmonton Indy
- Location: Edmonton City Centre Airport
- Course: Temporary street circuit 2.224 mi / 3.579 km
- Distance: 75 laps 166.80 mi / 268.439 km
- Weather: Temperatures reaching up to 26 °C (79 °F); winds gusting up to 15 kilometres per hour (9.3 mph) throughout the day

Pole position
- Driver: (United States) Ryan Hunter-Reay (Andretti Autosport)
- Time: 1:17.2338

Fastest lap
- Driver: (United States) Josef Newgarden (Sarah Fisher Hartman Racing)
- Time: 1:17.3629 (on lap 68 of 75)

Podium
- First: (Brazil) Hélio Castroneves (Team Penske)
- Second: (Japan) Takuma Sato (Rahal Letterman Lanigan Racing)
- Third: (Australia) Will Power (Team Penske)

The 2012 Edmonton Indy was the eleventh round of the 2012 IndyCar Series season. It took place on Sunday, July 22, 2012. The race was contested over 75 laps at the 2.224-mile (3.579 km) temporary airport course at Edmonton City Centre Airport in Edmonton, Alberta, Canada. It would be the final Edmonton Indy race as the event was dropped from the IndyCar calendar beginning in 2013.

== Classification ==
=== Starting grid ===
Row	Inside		Outside	
1	10	(United Kingdom) Dario Franchitti	2	(Australia) Ryan Briscoe
2	15	(Japan) Takuma Sato	98	(Canada) Alex Tagliani
3	3	(Brazil) Hélio Castroneves	77	(France) Simon Pagenaud (R)
4	8	(Brazil) Rubens Barrichello	38	(United States) Graham Rahal
5	27	(Canada) James Hinchcliffe	18	(United Kingdom) Justin Wilson
6	28	(United States) Ryan Hunter-Reay ^{†}	7	(France) Sébastien Bourdais
7	67	(United States) Josef Newgarden (R)	19	(United Kingdom) James Jakes
8	26	(United States) Marco Andretti	5	(Venezuela) E. J. Viso
9	12	(Australia) Will Power ^{†}	9	(New Zealand) Scott Dixon ^{‡}
10	83	(United States) Charlie Kimball	4	(United States) J. R. Hildebrand
11	11	(Brazil) Tony Kanaan	20	(United States) Ed Carpenter
12	14	(United Kingdom) Mike Conway	22	(Spain) Oriol Servià ^{†}
13	78	(Switzerland) Simona de Silvestro ^{‡}		
^{†} Hunter-Reay, Power and Servià penalized 10 places for changing engine^{‡} Dixon and de Silvestro penalized 10 places for exceeding five-engine limit

=== Race results ===
Pos	No.	Driver	Team	Engine	Laps	Time/Retired	Grid	Laps Led	Points^{1}
1	3	(Brazil) Hélio Castroneves	Team Penske	Chevrolet	75	1:38:50.9294	5	22	50
2	15	(Japan) Takuma Sato	Rahal Letterman Lanigan Racing	Honda	75	+ 0.8367	3	0	40
3	12	(Australia) Will Power	Team Penske	Chevrolet	75	+ 5.3697	17	3	35
4	38	(United States) Graham Rahal	Chip Ganassi Racing	Honda	75	+ 6.9481	8	0	32
5	98	(Canada) Alex Tagliani	Team Barracuda – BHA	Honda	75	+ 15.2358	4	49	32
6	10	(United Kingdom) Dario Franchitti	Chip Ganassi Racing	Honda	75	+ 15.8757	1	0	28
7	28	(United States) Ryan Hunter-Reay	Andretti Autosport	Chevrolet	75	+ 21.5357	11	0	27
8	2	(Australia) Ryan Briscoe	Team Penske	Chevrolet	75	+ 23.5311	2	1	24
9	18	(United Kingdom) Justin Wilson	Dale Coyne Racing	Honda	75	+ 26.3280	10	0	22
10	9	(New Zealand) Scott Dixon	Chip Ganassi Racing	Honda	75	+ 26.6481	18	0	20
11	14	(United Kingdom) Mike Conway	A. J. Foyt Enterprises	Honda	75	+ 27.0458	23	0	19
12	27	(Canada) James Hinchcliffe	Andretti Autosport	Chevrolet	75	+ 31.4527	9	0	18
13	8	(Brazil) Rubens Barrichello	KV Racing Technology	Chevrolet	75	+ 35.1256	7	0	17
14	26	(United States) Marco Andretti	Andretti Autosport	Chevrolet	75	+ 39.8669	15	0	16
15	7	(France) Sébastien Bourdais	Dragon Racing	Chevrolet	75	+ 40.8154	12	0	15
16	5	(Venezuela) E. J. Viso	KV Racing Technology	Chevrolet	75	+ 55.1028	16	0	14
17	67	(United States) Josef Newgarden (R)	Sarah Fisher Hartman Racing	Honda	75	+ 56.0449	13	0	13
18	11	(Brazil) Tony Kanaan	KV Racing Technology	Chevrolet	75	+ 57.0272	21	0	12
19	83	(United States) Charlie Kimball	Chip Ganassi Racing	Honda	75	+ 1:04.8947^{†}	19	0	12
20	77	(France) Simon Pagenaud (R)	Schmidt Hamilton Motorsports	Honda	74	Contact	6	0	12
21	4	(United States) J. R. Hildebrand	Panther Racing	Chevrolet	74	+ 1 lap	20	0	12
22	20	(United States) Ed Carpenter	Ed Carpenter Racing	Chevrolet	74	+ 1 lap	22	0	12
23	78	(Switzerland) Simona de Silvestro	HVM Racing	Lotus	74	+ 1 lap	25	0	12
24	22	(Spain) Oriol Servià	Panther/Dreyer & Reinbold Racing	Chevrolet	65	Mechanical	24	0	12
25	19	(United Kingdom) James Jakes	Dale Coyne Racing	Honda	43	Mechanical	14	0	10
^{†} Kimball penalised 30 seconds for avoidable contact
OFFICIAL BOX SCORE

Notes

^{1} Points include 1 point for pole position and 2 points for most laps led.

== Standings after the race ==
Drivers' Championship

Pos	Driver	Points
1	(United States) Ryan Hunter-Reay	362
2	(Brazil) Hélio Castroneves	339
3	(Australia) Will Power	336
4	(New Zealand) Scott Dixon	301
5	(Canada) James Hinchcliffe	286

Manufacturers' Championship

Pos	Manufacturer	Points
1	(United States) Chevrolet	90
2	(Japan) Honda	75
3	(United Kingdom) Lotus	44

- Note: Only the top five positions are included for the driver standings.

Previous race: 2012 Honda Indy Toronto	IndyCar Series; 2012 season	Next race: 2012 Honda Indy 200 at Mid-Ohio
Previous race: 2011 Edmonton Indy	2012 Edmonton Indy	Next race: None
