= São Paulo Indy 300 =

Itaipava São Paulo Indy 300 presented by Nestlé

IndyCar Series
- Location: São Paulo Street Circuit, Santana, São Paulo, Brazil; 23°31′0″S 46°38′30″W
- Corporate sponsor: Itaipava, Nestlé
- First race: 2010
- First IRL race: 2010
- Last race: 2013
- Distance: 306.097 km (190.200 mi)
- Laps: 75
- Most wins (driver): Will Power (3)
- Most wins (team): Team Penske (3)
- Most wins (manufacturer): Chevrolet/Honda

Circuit information
- Surface: Asphalt/Concrete
- Length: 4.080 km (2.535 mi)
- Turns: 11
- Lap record: 1:20.4312 (Ryan Hunter-Reay, Dallara DW12-Chevrolet, 2013, IndyCar)

The Itaipava São Paulo Indy 300 presented by Nestlé was an event in the IRL IndyCar Series, contested in the 2010 through 2013 IndyCar Series seasons.

The event was originally announced on November 25, 2009, as the first championship event for the series outside North America and Japan, and the first American open-wheel race in the country since the Rio 200 at Jacarepaguá in the 2000 CART season. Due to a lengthy distance to travel from most team bases, the event promoters offered each team a six-figure sum of money, as well as paying for all expenses.

The street circuit race track was laid out in the Santana district, birthplace of legendary Brazilian driver Ayrton Senna and Brazilian auto racing pioneer Chico Landi. The main straightaway of the circuit was along the Sambadrome of Anhembi and utilized portions of the Marginal Tietê service drive. The Anhembi Convention Center was used for support facilities and spectator attractions. The circuit was one of two IndyCar Series circuits (Baltimore the other) to have pit lanes not positioned at the start-finish line; São Paulo's was positioned after turn four.

== Past results ==
Season	Date	Driver	Team	Chassis	Engine	Race Distance		Race Time	Average Speed (mph)	Report	Refs
Season	Date	Driver	Team	Chassis	Engine	Laps	Miles (km)	Race Time	Average Speed (mph)	Report	Refs
2010	March 14	(Australia) Will Power	Team Penske	Dallara IR05	Honda	61*	158.6 (255.241)	2:00:57	76.733	Report	
2011	May 1/2*	(Australia) Will Power	Team Penske	Dallara IR05	Honda	55*	139.48 (224.471)	2:04:05	67.442	Report	
2012	April 29	(Australia) Will Power	Team Penske	Dallara DW12	Chevrolet	75	190.2 (306.097)	2:08:18	88.945	Report	
2013	May 5	(Canada) James Hinchcliffe	Andretti Autosport	Dallara DW12	Chevrolet	75	190.2 (306.097)	2:09:34	88.07	Report	

- 2010: Race shortened due to rain and two-hour time limit.
- 2011: Rain forced a postponement of the race after 15 laps. Race resumed on Monday and was shortened due to rain and two-hour time limit.

== See also ==
- Brazilian Grand Prix
