= 2012 IndyCar Series =

American auto racing season

2012 IndyCar season
- IZOD IndyCar Series

Season
- Races: 15
- Start date: March 25
- End date: September 15

Awards
- Drivers' champion: (United States) Ryan Hunter-Reay
- Manufacturers' Cup: (United States) Chevrolet
- Rookie of the Year: (France) Simon Pagenaud
- Indianapolis 500 winner: (United Kingdom) Dario Franchitti

Discipline champions
- Oval champion: (United States) Ryan Hunter-Reay
- Road course champion: (Australia) Will Power

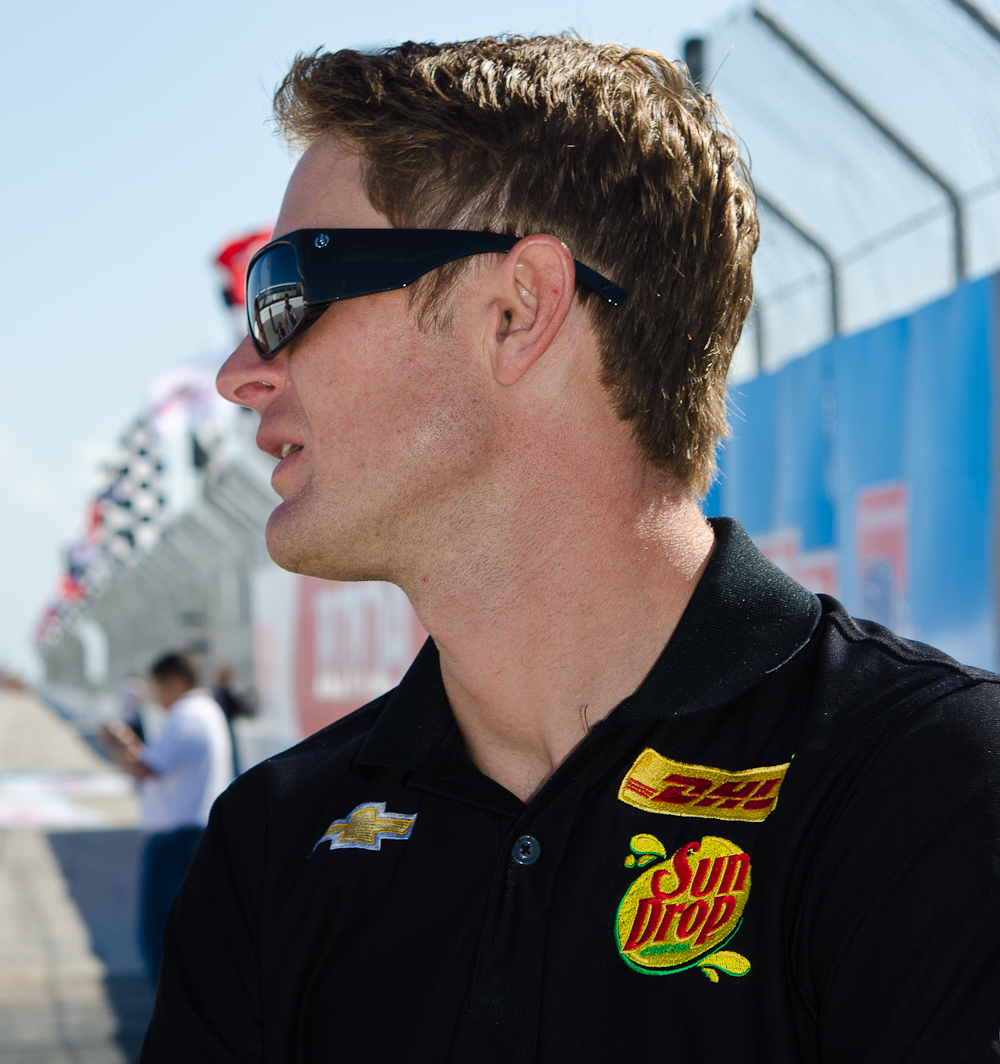
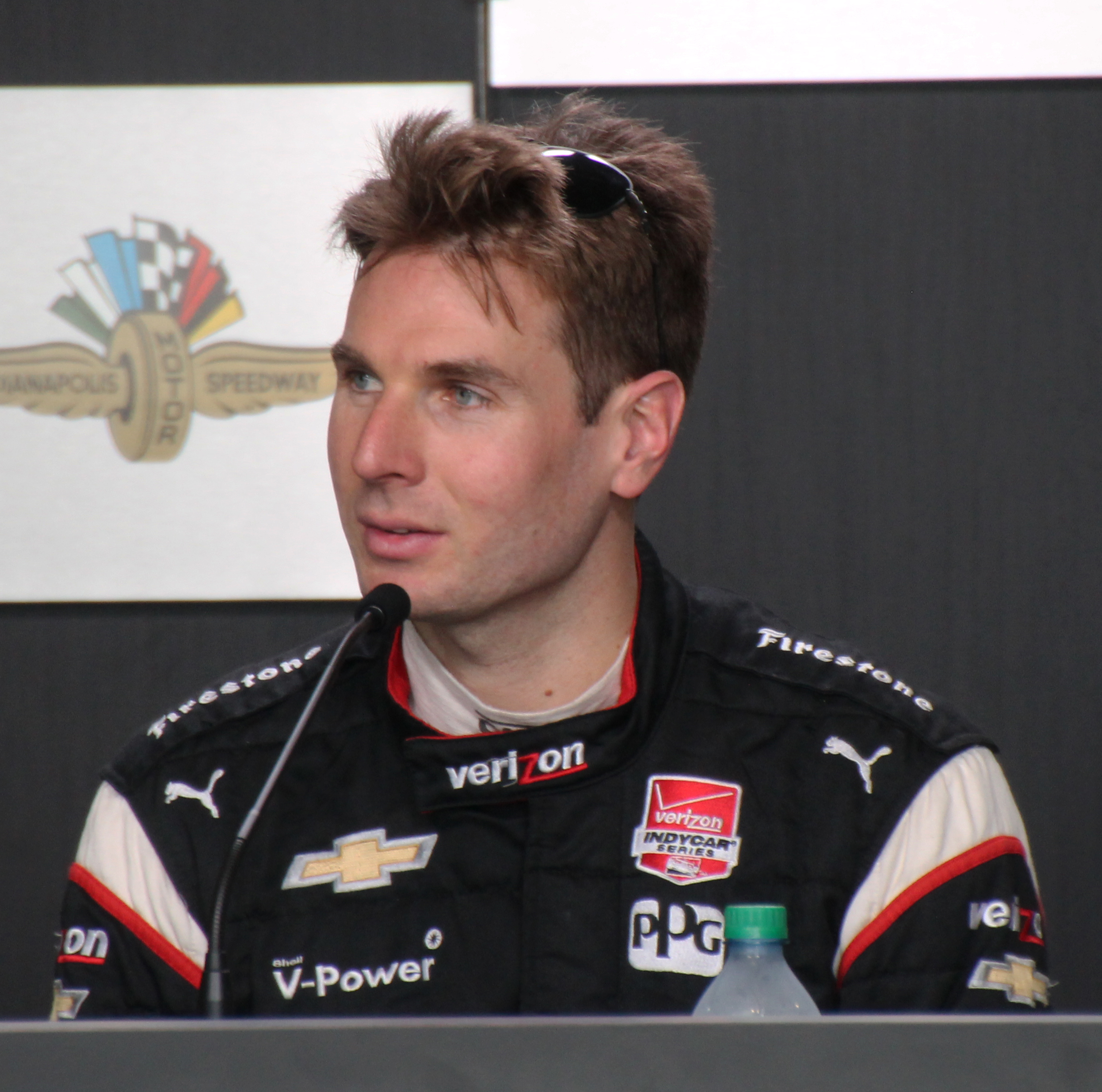
Ryan Hunter-Reay (left) won his first Drivers' Championship while Will Power (right) finished second in the championship

The 2012 IZOD IndyCar Series was the 17th season of the IndyCar Series, and the 101st season of American open wheel racing. Its premier event was the 96th Indianapolis 500, held on Sunday, May 27. The series was sanctioned by IndyCar, and took place in three countries on two continents. Chevrolet returned to the series for the first time since 2005 while Lotus debuted, with the latter leaving the IndyCar Series after the 2012 season due to poor performance.

Three-time defending IndyCar champion Dario Franchitti entered the season seeking his fourth consecutive championship and fifth overall. Meanwhile, two-time championship runner up Will Power sought his first title. Heading into the final race of the season, Power led Ryan Hunter-Reay by 17 points in a two driver fight for the championship. After Power wrecked on lap 55, Hunter-Reay was able to finish 4th, and claimed the championship by 3 points.

Among the numerous stories going into the season was the departure of Danica Patrick, who left IndyCar to compete in the NASCAR Nationwide Series. Joining the series was former Formula One driver Rubens Barrichello. A highlight of the season was the introduction of a new chassis and engine package.

After losing Las Vegas as a venue in the aftermath of the death of Dan Wheldon, the series welcomed the return of such venues as Detroit and Fontana. In addition, midway through the season, the inaugural Indy Qingdao 600 scheduled to take place in China was cancelled by the promoter.

It was a triumphant return for Chevrolet after returning from a 6-year absence, and an average year for Honda topped by an unexpectedly good performance at the 500 after poor qualifying, and thus Chevrolet ended the Japanese engine manufacturer's nine-year supremacy.

== Drivers and teams ==
All chassis are composed of a Dallara DW12 "IndyCar Safety Cell" base and aerokit in 2012. All teams will run Firestone tires.

Team	Engine	No.	Driver(s)	Rounds
A. J. Foyt Enterprises	Honda	14	(United Kingdom) Mike Conway	1–14
A. J. Foyt Enterprises	Honda	14	(New Zealand) Wade Cunningham R	15
A. J. Foyt Enterprises	Honda	41	(New Zealand) Wade Cunningham R	5
Andretti Autosport	Chevrolet	26	(United States) Marco Andretti	All
Andretti Autosport	Chevrolet	27	(Canada) James Hinchcliffe	All
Andretti Autosport	Chevrolet	28	(United States) Ryan Hunter-Reay	All
AFS Racing / Andretti Autosport	Chevrolet	17	(Colombia) Sebastián Saavedra	5, 13, 15
Andretti Autosport / Conquest Racing	Chevrolet	25	(Brazil) Ana Beatriz	4–5
Chip Ganassi Racing	Honda	9	(New Zealand) Scott Dixon	All
Chip Ganassi Racing	Honda	10	(United Kingdom) Dario Franchitti	All
Chip Ganassi Racing	Honda	38	(United States) Graham Rahal	All
Chip Ganassi Racing	Honda	83	(United States) Charlie Kimball	1–11, 13–15
Chip Ganassi Racing	Honda	83	(Italy) Giorgio Pantano R ^{1}	12
Dale Coyne Racing	Honda	18	(United Kingdom) Justin Wilson	All
Dale Coyne Racing	Honda	19	(United Kingdom) James Jakes	All
Dragon Racing^{2} ^{3}	Lotus; Chevrolet	6	(United Kingdom) Katherine Legge R	1–5, 7–9, 13, 15
Dragon Racing^{2} ^{3}	Lotus; Chevrolet	7	(France) Sébastien Bourdais	1–6, 10–14
Dreyer & Reinbold Racing; Panther/Dreyer & Reinbold Racing^{2} ^{4}	Lotus; Chevrolet	22	(Spain) Oriol Servià	All
Ed Carpenter Racing	Chevrolet	20	(United States) Ed Carpenter	All
KV Racing Technology	Chevrolet	5	(Venezuela) E. J. Viso	All
KV Racing Technology	Chevrolet	8	(Brazil) Rubens Barrichello (Note: Not considered a series rookie. He was only considered an Indy rookie.)	All
KV Racing Technology with SH	Chevrolet	11	(Brazil) Tony Kanaan	All
Lotus–Fan Force United	Lotus	64	(France) Jean Alesi R	5
Lotus–HVM Racing	Lotus	78	(Switzerland) Simona de Silvestro	All
Panther Racing	Chevrolet	4	(United States) J. R. Hildebrand	All
Rahal Letterman Lanigan Racing	Honda	15	(Japan) Takuma Sato	All
Rahal Letterman Lanigan Racing	Honda	30	(Mexico) Michel Jourdain Jr.	5
Schmidt–Hamilton Motorsports	Honda	77	(France) Simon Pagenaud R	All
Schmidt–Hamilton Motorsports	Honda	99	(United States) Townsend Bell	5
Sarah Fisher Hartman Racing	Honda	39	(United States) Bryan Clauson R	5
Sarah Fisher Hartman Racing	Honda	67	(United States) Josef Newgarden R	1–13, 15
Sarah Fisher Hartman Racing	Honda	67	(Brazil) Bruno Junqueira^{6}	14
Team Barracuda – BHA^{2} ^{5}	Lotus; Honda	98	(Canada) Alex Tagliani	1–3, 5–15
Team Penske	Chevrolet	2	(Australia) Ryan Briscoe	All
Team Penske	Chevrolet	3	(Brazil) Hélio Castroneves	All
Team Penske	Chevrolet	12	(Australia) Will Power	All

Notes

(R) – Rookie

1. Charlie Kimball broke his hand in an accident while testing at Mid-Ohio on July 26. Pantano replaced Kimball for the subsequent race at Mid-Ohio.
2. Team Barracuda – BHA, Dreyer & Reinbold Racing and Dragon Racing terminated their Lotus engine contracts prior to the Indianapolis 500.
3. Dragon Racing was reduced to a single-car team following the Indianapolis 500, as engine supplier Chevrolet could not supply engines for both cars. Bourdais was named to drive on the remaining road and street courses, and Legge was named to drive on the remaining ovals and Sonoma.
4. Dreyer & Reinbold Racing formed a strategic alliance with Panther Racing prior to the Indianapolis 500, and obtained Panther's second Chevrolet engine contract.
5. Team Barracuda – BHA skipped the São Paulo race to concentrate on preparations for the Indy 500.
6. Josef Newgarden broke his left index finger in an accident during the Sonoma race. Junqueira replaced Newgarden for the following race at Baltimore.

=== Team and driver changes ===
- Team Penske: Team utilized full-works Chevrolet engines beginning in 2012 and thus Team Penske earned full-factory support from Chevrolet including free engines and official road vehicles. The entire three car team returns full-time in 2012. Briscoe will switch numbers from #6 to #2.
- Chip Ganassi Racing: Team utilized Honda engines in 2012. The entire four-car team will return in 2012.
- Andretti Autosport: The team utilized customer Chevrolet engines in 2012. Marco Andretti will be in the third year of a 4-year contract with the team in 2012 Ryan Hunter-Reay signed with Andretti Autosport through the 2012 season. 2011 driver Danica Patrick left the team to compete in the Nationwide series full-time along with limited Sprint Cup Schedule. The team announced on August 26, 2011, that GoDaddy will return as a primary sponsor through 2013. Andretti confirmed that Dan Wheldon had signed a deal with Andretti to replace Patrick in the #7 GoDaddy car, but was killed at Las Vegas. James Hinchcliffe drove the GoDaddy car, and the number switched from #7 to #27, the same used by fellow Canadian drivers Gilles Villeneuve and Jacques Villeneuve. The team confirmed Sebastián Saavedra and Ana Beatriz for the Indy 500.
- Newman/Haas Racing: The team announced that it would not contest the full 2012 season on December 1, 2011. Jean Alesi was announced to drive for the team at the Indianapolis 500. The entry was later withdrawn.
- Sam Schmidt Motorsports: The team ran Honda engines in 2012. The team announced Simon Pagenaud as its first driver on December 8 and that a second full-time car was "likely", but Pagenaud was the team's lone entry to start the season. On May 3, 2012, the team confirmed that Townsend Bell would drive the #99 car for Schmidt Pelfrey Motorsports.
- A. J. Foyt Enterprises: Mike Conway replaces Vítor Meira as the team driver. The team ran Honda engines in 2012. The team confirmed Wade Cunningham for the Indy 500. Cunningham also raced in the season finale after Conway sat out over safety concerns on oval tracks.
- Panther Racing: J. R. Hildebrand signed a multi-year deal in 2011 to drive the #4 National Guard car for the team.
- KV Racing Technology: The team ran Chevrolet engines in 2012. Driver Tony Kanaan signed a multi-year contract to return to the team in 2012. The team confirmed the return of E. J. Viso, switching to the #5 car. Rubens Barrichello was confirmed to be driving the full season with the team at a press conference in Brazil on March 1.
- Dreyer & Reinbold Racing: In November, the team announced that they had signed on as a Lotus works team for 2012. Oriol Servià signed to be one of the team's drivers, but efforts to field a second entry failed to materialize.
- HVM Racing: Simona de Silvestro returned as a full-time driver for the team in 2012. The team was the anchor team for the new Lotus engines in 2012.
- Dale Coyne Racing: Owner Dale Coyne confirmed that the team would return with two cars in 2012, with Honda engines. Justin Wilson and James Jakes both returned.
- Conquest Racing: While Éric Bachelart stated the team will have at least one full-time car in 2012. Difficulties securing an engine lease and a subsequent American Le Mans Series LMP2 program kept Conquest's IndyCar plans on hold.
- Rahal Letterman Lanigan Racing: The team purchased two DW12 chassis. The cars were powered by Honda engines. The team confirmed Takuma Sato as one of their drivers in early February 2012. The team confirmed a second car at the Indy 500, to be driven by Michel Jourdain Jr.
- Bryan Herta Autosport: The team budgeted money to buy two Dallara DW12 chassis. The team confirmed Alex Tagliani on January 9, 2012.
- Sarah Fisher Hartman Racing: Driver Ed Carpenter has left to form his own team. 2011 Indy Lights champ Josef Newgarden was the team's driver for 2012. The team will be powered by Honda engines. The team confirmed Bryan Clauson for the Indy 500.
- Dragon Racing: The team intended to run two full-time cars, with drivers Sébastien Bourdais and Katherine Legge. The team will be powered by Lotus engines. Legge has signed a multi-year deal with the team to drive the #6 car. However, after switching from Lotus to Chevrolet engines, they were forced to contract to a single entry after the Indianapolis 500.
- MSR Indy: The team is owned by Mike Shank, A. J. Allmendinger, and Columbus area businessman Brian Bailey. The team was intended to use Lotus engines. The team has purchased a DW12 chassis with the goal of running a full-time IndyCar program in 2012, and took delivery of their chassis on December 15. Unfortunately, the team did not secure the necessary funding to begin the season with often rumored, but never confirmed, driver Paul Tracy. The team originally confirmed Jay Howard for the Indy 500, but Shank released Howard in early May due to the inability to get an engine.
- Ed Carpenter Racing: Driver Ed Carpenter and his stepfather Tony George formed a new team, Ed Carpenter Racing. Carpenter was the full-time driver in 2012. The team confirmed a second car for the Indy 500, but the entry was later withdrawn.

== The ICONIC Project ==
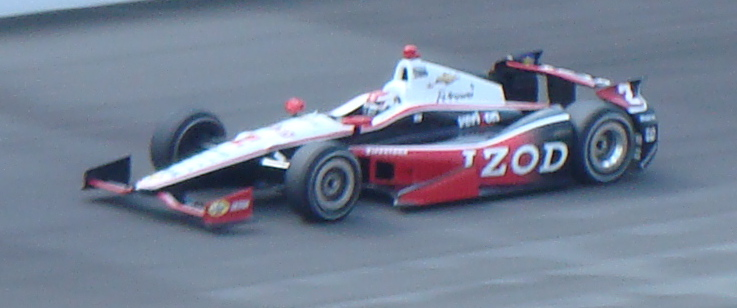
The IndyCar Car ICONIC Project.

The 2012 season saw the implementation of IndyCar's new ICONIC Plan (Innovative, Competitive, Open-wheel, New, Industry-relevant, Cost-effective), the biggest change to the sport in recent history. The car used through 2011, a 2003/2007-model Dallara IR-03, and normally aspirated V8 engines (required since 1997) were permanently retired. The ICONIC committee was composed of experts and executives from racing and technical fields: Randy Bernard, William R. Looney III, Brian Barnhart, Gil de Ferran, Tony Purnell, Eddie Gossage, Neil Ressler, Tony Cotman and Rick Long. IndyCar accepted proposals from BAT Engineering, Dallara, DeltaWing, Lola and Swift for chassis design. On July 14, 2010, the final decision was made public, with organisers accepting the Dallara proposal.

=== New chassis ===
Under the new ICONIC regulations, all teams will compete with a core rolling chassis, called the "IndyCar Safety Cell", developed by Italian designer Dallara. Teams will then outfit the chassis with separate body work, referred to as "Aero Kits", which consist of front and rear wings, sidepods, and engine cowlings. Development of Aero Kits is open to any manufacturer, with all packages to be made available to all teams for a maximum price. ICONIC committee member Tony Purnell gave an open invitation to car manufacturers and companies such as Lockheed Martin and GE to develop kits.

The IndyCar Safety cell will be capped at a price of $349,000 and will be assembled at a new Dallara facility in Speedway, Indiana. Aero Kits will be capped at $70,000. Teams have the option of buying a complete Dallara safety cell/aero kit for a discounted price.

On May 12, 2011, Dallara unveiled the first concept cars, one apiece in oval and road course Aero Kit configuration.

On April 30, 2011, IndyCar owners voted 15–0 to reject the introduction of multiple Aero Kits for the 2012 season, citing costs. Owners expressed their desire to introduce the new chassis/engines for 2012, but have all participants use the Dallara aerodynamic package in 2012, and delay the introduction of multiple aero kits until 2013. On August 14, 2011, IndyCar confirmed that the introduction of multiple Aero Kits would be delayed until 2013 for "economic reasons," and furthermore, it was put off for 2013 as well. Chevrolet and Lotus had already announced their intention to build aero kits.

2011 Indianapolis 500 winner Dan Wheldon carried out the first official test of the Dallara chassis at Mid-Ohio in August 2011. Following Wheldon's death at the season-ending race in Las Vegas, Dallara announced that the 2012 chassis would be named the DW12 in his honor.

Despite the generational change of chassis and engines, the wheel rim and Firestone Firehawk tire sizes would remain same until at least 2024 season.

==== Fuel cell capacity ====
The fuel cell capacity of the new Dallara DW12 car was reduced from 22 US gallons (83 litres) to 18.5 US gallons (70 litres) in an effort of fuel efficiency.

=== Engine formula ===
Turbochargers returned to the IndyCar Series for the first time since the IRL 1996 and Champ Car 2007 seasons respectively after one-year delay. The newly-revolutionary third generation fuel-efficient engines are single and twin-turbocharged engines, tuned to produce a range of 550–700 horsepower (410–520 kW) with a 12,000 RPM limit. The maximum engine displacement was reduced from 3.5 to 2.2 litres (214 to 134 cubic inches), the number of cylinders were scaled-down from eight to six and the engine shape will remain V-shaped. All engines will run E85 fuel; from 2007 to 2011, the series utilized 100% fuel grade ethanol. The turbochargers are provided by BorgWarner. The third generation of IndyCar Series engines would be used until 2027 season.

=== Suppliers ===
On November 12, 2010, Chevrolet was confirmed as an engine supplier for 2012 with a twin turbo V6. The initial list of potential suppliers included Ford, Cosworth, and Mazda. Honda announced a 2.2-liter turbo V6 developed fully by Honda Performance Development. On May 27, 2011, Ganassi and Honda announced their partnership renewal for 2012. On August 19, 2010, Cosworth announced their interest in providing an inline-four engine, however, the plan was eventually scrapped. The Chevrolet engine is built in a joint effort with Ilmor who last time partnered Chevrolet in 1997–2002 (1997–2001 as Oldsmobile) and Honda in 2003–2011, and was introduced in full-works partnership with Penske Racing.

The third engine supplier was announced November 18, 2010 at the LA Auto Show, just prior to the league deadline. Lotus announced a twin turbo V6 engine and an Aero Kit. built in a partnership with John Judd and Jack Brabham (Engine Developments Ltd.) Judd engines were used in the CART series and at the Indy 500 from 1987 to 1992, as well as in sports car racing and F1. Lotus has suffered difficulty in both power and delivery of engines and has since pulled out of the sport.

==== Confirmed engine suppliers ====
- Chevrolet
- Honda
- Lotus

The arrival of Chevrolet and Lotus as IndyCar Series engine suppliers were marked the return of multiple engine suppliers since 2005 season when Chevrolet and Toyota were Honda engine competitors.

== Rule changes ==
- Any engine changes for an engine that has run less than 1,850 miles will result in 10-place grid penalty at the next race. Further, full-time entries are limited to 5 engines per season. There will be two exceptions:
  - If an engine fails during a race, in which a new engine may be installed for the next event without penalty.
  - At Indianapolis, all engine penalties will be served at the next race at Detroit. Further, all full-time season entries will receive a new engine penalty-free between Bump Day & Carb Day.
- Beginning at Long Beach for all remaining road/street course events, the pits will remain open throughout non-emergency full-course cautions periods. Previously the pits immediately closed upon the display of the caution flag. The series hopes this will shorten caution periods to as few as two laps.
- Also beginning at Long Beach for all remaining road/street course events, cars that are not on the lead lap during an upcoming restart in the final 20 laps will peel off and drive through pit lane on the speed limiter and cycle back to the end of the line. The rule was later expanded to oval races as well, where lead-lap cars will simply drive to the front in position order instead. This is similar to NASCAR's restart procedure, where all lapped cars must move to the rear of the field.
- For the races at Indianapolis, Texas, and California, restarts will revert to single-file in response to safety concerns.

== Schedule ==
The 2012 schedule included the following 15 races:

Icon	Legend
O	Oval/Speedway
R	Road course
S	Street circuit
C	Cancelled race

Rnd	Date	Race name	Track	Location
1	March 25	Honda Grand Prix of St. Petersburg	S Streets of St. Petersburg	St. Petersburg, Florida
2	April 1	Honda Indy Grand Prix of Alabama	R Barber Motorsports Park	Birmingham, Alabama
3	April 15	38th Toyota Grand Prix of Long Beach	S Streets of Long Beach	Long Beach, California
4	April 29	Itaipava São Paulo Indy 300	S Streets of São Paulo	São Paulo, Brazil
5	May 27	96th Indianapolis 500-Mile Race	O Indianapolis Motor Speedway	Speedway, Indiana
6	June 3	Chevrolet Detroit Belle Isle Grand Prix	S Belle Isle	Detroit, Michigan
7	June 9	Firestone 550	O Texas Motor Speedway	Fort Worth, Texas
8	June 16	Milwaukee IndyFest	O Milwaukee Mile	West Allis, Wisconsin
9	June 23	Iowa Corn Indy 250	O Iowa Speedway	Newton, Iowa
10	July 8	Honda Indy Toronto	S Exhibition Place	Toronto, Ontario
11	July 22	Edmonton Indy	R Edmonton City Centre Airport Speedway	Edmonton, Alberta
12	August 5	Honda Indy 200 at Mid-Ohio	R Mid-Ohio Sports Car Course	Lexington, Ohio
C	August 19	Indy Qingdao 600	S Streets of Qingdao	Qingdao, China
13	August 26	GoPro Indy Grand Prix of Sonoma	R Sonoma Raceway	Sonoma, California
14	September 2	Grand Prix of Baltimore	S Streets of Baltimore	Baltimore, Maryland
15	September 15	MAVTV 500 IndyCar World Championships	O Auto Club Speedway	Fontana, California

=== Schedule development ===
==== Existing race contracts ====
- The Honda Grand Prix of St. Petersburg will continue through 2013. City officials look to extend the contract through 2014.
- Barber Motorsports Park signed a three-year deal through 2012.
- An agreement has been signed with the city of Long Beach to extend the Toyota Grand Prix of Long Beach to 2015 with an option through 2020.
- The São Paulo Indy 300 has a contract through 2019.
- The Honda Indy Toronto has renewed its contracts through 2014.
- The Edmonton Indy has a contract in place through 2013.
- The contract for the Baltimore Grand Prix runs through 2015. However, an issue with the promoter has been in dispute and a new promoter was scheduled to be announced in mid-February. In May 2012, it was announced that Race On LLP and Andretti Sports Marketing had reached a five-year agreement with the City of Baltimore.
- Michael Andretti has been announced as the new promoter of the Milwaukee 225. The race, not originally on the INDYCAR schedule, was announced February 10, and is now known as the Milwaukee IndyFest.

==== New/Returning races ====
- Detroit Belle Isle Grand Prix returns to the schedule for 2012, having been removed after the 2008 event.
- The series will return to Auto Club Speedway in Fontana, California for a 500-mile night race on Saturday, September 15, 2012.

==== Potential races ====
- A fifteen-race calendar was announced in December 2011; however, amid speculation of a race being organized in Fort Lauderdale, it was reported in January 2012 that the series needed sixteen races in order to fulfill obligations to sponsors.
- After the cancellation of the China race, it was believed that IndyCar would need to replace it to fulfill sponsorship obligations. Road America, Mazda Raceway Laguna Seca, Michigan, and a second race at Texas were considered. However, on June 25, IndyCar announced that the schedule would remain at 15 races.

==== Discontinued races ====
- The series did not return to the New Hampshire Motor Speedway in 2012.
- The Indy Japan 300 did not return in 2012.
- The series did not return to the Kentucky Speedway after IndyCar failed to reach an agreement with the track.
- Las Vegas Motor Speedway was removed from the calendar in the aftermath of Dan Wheldon's death.

==== Cancelled race ====
- The series was supposed to visit China for the first time; the Indy Qingdao 600 was to be held on a 3.87-mile street circuit in Qingdao over the weekend of August 19, with plans to build a permanent road course for future seasons. However, this race was cancelled by the promoter on June 13.

== Testing ==
The first official test of the Dallara DW12 chassis was carried out by Dan Wheldon at Mid-Ohio on August 8, 2011. Phase I of testing involved Wheldon, and was planned to involve three road courses and three ovals, over a total of about twelve days. The second test was held August 18 at Barber, and the third was held on the USGP road course at Indianapolis on September 1. Oval tests took place in September at Iowa and Indianapolis.

Honda (Scott Dixon) and Chevrolet (Will Power) began Phase II of on-track testing at Mid-Ohio in early October. A scheduled test at Las Vegas was cancelled after the fatal crash of Dan Wheldon. Testing resumed in late October and continued through February at several venues including Sebring, Fontana, Homestead, Phoenix, and Sonoma. Lotus first took to the track on January 12 at Palm Beach, and testing by individual teams began on January 16.

A full-field official open test took place on March 5–6 & 8–9, 2012 at Sebring International Raceway.

Full-field oval open tests are scheduled for April 4, 2012 at Indianapolis Motor Speedway and for May 7, 2012 at Texas Motor Speedway.

== Results ==
Rd.	Race	Pole position	Fastest lap	Most laps led	Race Winner			Report
Rd.	Race	Pole position	Fastest lap	Most laps led	Driver	Team	Manufacturer	Report
1	St. Petersburg	(Australia) Will Power	(Australia) Will Power	(New Zealand) Scott Dixon	(Brazil) Hélio Castroneves	Team Penske	Chevrolet	Report
2	Barber	(Brazil) Hélio Castroneves	(Australia) Will Power	(New Zealand) Scott Dixon	(Australia) Will Power	Team Penske	Chevrolet	Report
3	Long Beach	(Australia) Ryan Briscoe (Note: Briscoe, the fastest qualifier from the Fast Six shootout, was assessed a 10-place grid penalty for an unapproved engine change. Dario Franchitti, who qualified 4th, was the highest-placed driver not to have a penalty, and thus started the race from pole position. Briscoe earned the pole-winner's championship point.)	(Brazil) Tony Kanaan	(France) Simon Pagenaud	(Australia) Will Power	Team Penske	Chevrolet	Report
4	São Paulo	(Australia) Will Power	(United States) Josef Newgarden	(Australia) Will Power	(Australia) Will Power	Team Penske	Chevrolet	Report
5	Indianapolis	(Australia) Ryan Briscoe	(United States) Marco Andretti	(United States) Marco Andretti	(United Kingdom) Dario Franchitti	Chip Ganassi Racing	Honda	Report
6	Detroit	(New Zealand) Scott Dixon	(United Kingdom) Justin Wilson	(New Zealand) Scott Dixon	(New Zealand) Scott Dixon	Chip Ganassi Racing	Honda	Report
7	Texas	(Canada) Alex Tagliani	(Australia) Ryan Briscoe	(New Zealand) Scott Dixon	(United Kingdom) Justin Wilson	Dale Coyne Racing	Honda	Report
8	Milwaukee	(United Kingdom) Dario Franchitti	(United States) Ryan Hunter-Reay	(United States) Ryan Hunter-Reay	(United States) Ryan Hunter-Reay	Andretti Autosport	Chevrolet	Report
9	Iowa	(United Kingdom) Dario Franchitti	(United States) Ed Carpenter	(Brazil) Hélio Castroneves	(United States) Ryan Hunter-Reay	Andretti Autosport	Chevrolet	Report
10	Toronto	(United Kingdom) Dario Franchitti	(United States) Josef Newgarden	(United States) Ryan Hunter-Reay	(United States) Ryan Hunter-Reay	Andretti Autosport	Chevrolet	Report
11	Edmonton	(United States) Ryan Hunter-Reay (Note: Hunter-Reay, the fastest qualifier from the Fast Six shootout, was assessed a 10-place grid penalty for an unapproved engine change. Dario Franchitti, who qualified 2nd, started the race from pole position. Hunter-Reay earned the pole-winner's championship point.)	(United States) Josef Newgarden	(Canada) Alex Tagliani	(Brazil) Hélio Castroneves	Team Penske	Chevrolet	Report
12	Mid-Ohio	(Australia) Will Power	(Spain) Oriol Servià	(Australia) Will Power	(New Zealand) Scott Dixon	Chip Ganassi Racing	Honda	Report
13	Sonoma	(Australia) Will Power	(United States) Ryan Hunter-Reay	(Australia) Will Power	(Australia) Ryan Briscoe	Team Penske	Chevrolet	Report
14	Baltimore	(Australia) Will Power	(Australia) Will Power	(Australia) Will Power	(United States) Ryan Hunter-Reay	Andretti Autosport	Chevrolet	Report
15	Fontana	(United States) Marco Andretti	(United Kingdom) Dario Franchitti	(United States) Ed Carpenter	(United States) Ed Carpenter	Ed Carpenter Racing	Chevrolet	Report

== Race summaries ==
=== Round 1 – St. Petersburg ===
Honda Grand Prix of St. Petersburg

Podium Finishers
Pos	Grid	No.	Driver	Team	Laps	Time
1	5	3	(Brazil) Hélio Castroneves	Team Penske	100	1:59:50.9863
2	6	9	(New Zealand) Scott Dixon	Chip Ganassi Racing	100	+5.5292
3	3	28	(United States) Ryan Hunter-Reay	Andretti Autosport	100	+7.5824
Race average speed: 90.113 mph (145.023 km/h)
Official Box Score: Report

- Date: Sunday March 25, 2012 — 12:30 p.m. EDT
- Race Name: Honda Grand Prix of St. Petersburg
- Circuit: Streets of St. Petersburg
- Location: St. Petersburg, Florida
- Track description: Temporary street circuit
- Track length: 1.8 miles (2.9 km)
- Distance: 100 laps / 180 miles (290 km)
- Race Report: 2012 Honda Grand Prix of St. Petersburg

Race Summary and Statistics
- Race Summary: Hélio Castroneves won the season-opening event, snapping a winless streak that dates back to Motegi in 2010. It was the first race for the new Dallara DW-12 chassis, and the new turbocharged engine package. Castroneves' victory marked the first win by Chevrolet in the IndyCar Series since 2005. It also marked the first race since the fatal accident of Dan Wheldon. Will Power took the lead from the pole position at the start, but during the first yellow, he ducked into the pits in order to gamble on a fuel strategy. The strategy backfired, and Power was not a factor during the remainder of the race. During the final sequence of pit stops, Castroneves and Scott Dixon were running 1st–2nd. Dixon pitted first on lap 72, and Castroneves pitted on lap later. As the rest of the leaders shuffled through their final pits stops, Castroneves made a bold pass of Dixon on the outside of turn 1 for second place. After the sequence of pit stops was over, Castroneves led the final 26 laps to claim the victory. On his victory lap, Castroneves stopped in turn 10, climbed from his car, and performed his customary "Spider-Man" celebration, climbing the catch fence. He climbed the fence which displayed the street sign "Dan Wheldon Way," which had been designated days earlier by the city of St. Petersburg in the memory of Wheldon.
- Pole position: #12 Will Power, 1:01.3721 sec, 105.585 mph (169.923 km/h)
- Lead changes: 9 between 7 drivers
- Lap Leaders
  - 1–11: #12 Power
  - 12–20: #2 Briscoe
  - 21–36: #9 Dixon
  - 37–46: #15 Sato
  - 47: #10 Franchitti
  - 48–68: #9 Dixon
  - 69–70: #3 Castroneves
  - 71: #15 Sato
  - 72–74: #4 Hildebrand
  - 75–100: #3 Castroneves
- Weather conditions: 77 °F (25 °C), partly cloudy
- Attendance: 125,000 (4-day weekend attendance)
- Cautions: 3 for 15 laps
- Caution Periods
  - 13–16: #6 Legge stalled on frontstretch
  - 20–27: #19 Jakes contact in turn 10
  - 46–48: #3 Castroneves & #20 Carpenter contact in turn 14
Television in the United States
- Television network: ABC
- Booth announcers: Marty Reid and Scott Goodyear
- Pit reporters: Jamie Little, Vince Welch, and Rick DeBruhl
- Ratings: 1.1 (overnight), 0.9 (final), 1.279 million viewers

=== Round 2 – Barber ===
Honda Indy Grand Prix of Alabama

Podium Finishers
Pos	Grid	No.	Driver	Team	Laps	Time
1	9	12	(Australia) Will Power	Team Penske	90	2:01:40.1127
2	3	9	(New Zealand) Scott Dixon	Chip Ganassi Racing	90	+3.3709
3	1	3	(Brazil) Hélio Castroneves	Team Penske	90	+19.1150
Race average speed: 102.081 mph (164.283 km/h)
Official Box Score: Report

- Date: Sunday April 1, 2012 — 2:00 p.m. EDT (1 p.m. CDT)
- Race Name: Indy Grand Prix of Alabama
- Circuit: Barber Motorsports Park
- Location: Birmingham, Alabama
- Track description: Road course
- Track length: 2.300 miles (3.701 km)
- Distance: 90 laps / 207.000 miles (333.134 km)
- Race Report: 2012 Indy Grand Prix of Alabama

Race Summary and Statistics
- Race Summary: Scott Dixon led 38 laps and was leading on lap 66 when he made his final pit stop. A slow pit stop caused by trouble on the left rear tire, as well as traffic in the pit lane, allowed Will Power to pass him going into turn one. After all the leaders shuffled through their pit stops, Power took the lead, and held off Dixon over the final laps to win.
- Pole position: #3 Hélio Castroneves, 1:10.4768 sec, 117.485 mph (189.074 km/h)
- Lead changes: 9 between 5 drivers
- Lap Leaders
  - 1–24: #3 Castroneves
  - 25: #27 Hinchcliffe
  - 26: #38 Rahal
  - 27–47: #9 Dixon
  - 48–49: #3 Castroneves
  - 50–65: #9 Dixon
  - 66–67: #3 Castroneves
  - 68–73: #12 Power
  - 74: #9 Dixon
  - 75–90: #12 Power
- Weather conditions: 82 °F (28 °C), partly cloudy
- Attendance: 52,879 (race day), 81,378 (weekend)
- Cautions: 2 for 10 laps
- Caution Periods
  - 1–3: #98 Tagliani stalled in turn 4
  - 67–73: #6 Legge spun in turn 9
Television in the United States
- Television network: NBC Sports Network
- Booth announcers: Bob Jenkins, Jon Beekhuis, Wally Dallenbach Jr.
- Pit reporters: Marty Snider, Kevin Lee, Townsend Bell, Robin Miller
- Ratings: 0.25 (final), 218,000 households

=== Round 3 – Long Beach ===
38th Toyota Grand Prix of Long Beach

Podium Finishers
Pos	Grid	No.	Driver	Team	Laps	Time
1	12	12	(Australia) Will Power	Team Penske	85	1:54:01.6082
2	4	77	(France) Simon Pagenaud R	Schmidt Hamilton Motorsports	85	+0.8675
3	16	27	(Canada) James Hinchcliffe	Andretti Autosport	85	+13.2719
Race average speed: 88.021 mph (141.656 km/h)
Official Box Score: REPORT

- Date: Sunday April 15, 2012 — 3:30 p.m. EDT (12:30 p.m. PDT)
- Race Name: Grand Prix of Long Beach
- Circuit: Streets of Long Beach
- Location: Long Beach, California
- Track description: Temporary street circuit
- Track length: 1.968 miles (3.167 km)
- Distance: 85 laps / 167.280 miles (269.211 km)
- Race Report: 2012 Toyota Grand Prix of Long Beach

Race Summary and Statistics
- Race Summary: Just days prior to the race, Chevrolet announced that all eleven of their entries would change engines, in violation of IndyCar's 1,850 mileage requirement rule. As a penalty, all of the Chevrolet entries would incur a 10-position grid penalty after time trials. In qualifying Chevrolet cars swept the top three spots, and 5 of the top 6. However, after the penalties were assessed, Honda driver Dario Franchitti was elevated to the pole. At the start, Dario Franchitti and rookie Josef Newgarden battled into turn one. Newgarden tried to take the lead on the outside, but the two cars clipped slightly, and Newgarden smacked the tire barrier and crashed out of the race. Franchitti took the lead for the first four laps, but quickly faded with handling problems, and was not a factor in the remainder of the race. Late in the second half, the race became a contest between rookie Simon Pagenaud and Will Power, with Takuma Sato also strong all afternoon. Power made his final pit stop on lap 64, and attempted to stretch his fuel over the final 21 laps. Pagenaud pitted on lap 70, and seemingly had plenty of fuel to charge to the finish. As Power held the lead, Pagenaud dramatically charged to catch Power, gaining 1–2 second per lap. The cars were nose-to-tail in the hairpin as they approached the white flag. Power held off on the final lap to win by 0.8 second. On the final lap, Sato lost his chance at a podium finish, as he suffered contact from Ryan Hunter-Reay and spun out into the wall. Hunter-Reay crossed the finish line third, but was penalized 30 seconds for "avoidable contact" in the Sato incident. The penalty elevated James Hinchcliffe to third in the official results. After the leaders took the checkered flag, a four-car melee occurred in the hairpin, involving Hélio Castroneves and Rubens Barrichello, among others. Despite all eleven of the Chevrolet entries being penalized 10 starting positions due to the engine changes, Chevrolet-powered cars swept 8 of the top ten finishing positions.
- Pole position: #2 Ryan Briscoe, 1:08.6089 sec, 103.264 mph (166.187 km/h)
- Lead changes: 9 between 7 drivers
- Lap Leaders
  - 1–4: #10 Franchitti
  - 5–19: #18 Wilson
  - 20–27: #15 Sato
  - 28: #28 Hunter-Reay
  - 29–33: #2 Briscoe
  - 34–47: #77 Pagenaud
  - 48–55: #15 Sato
  - 56–58: #28 Hunter-Reay
  - 59–70: #77 Pagenaud
  - 71–85: #12 Power
- Weather conditions: 61 °F (16 °C), partly cloudy
- Attendance: 170,000 (3-day weekend attendance)
- Cautions: 3 for 12 laps
- Caution Periods
  - 1–3: #67 Newgarden crashed in turn 1
  - 20–21: #7 Bourdais contact in turn 9
  - 23–29: #26 Andretti & #38 Rahal crash in turn 8; #98 Tagliani contact frontstretch; #6 Legge contact turn 9
Television in the United States
- Television network: NBC Sports Network
- Booth announcers: Bob Jenkins, Jon Beekhuis, Wally Dallenbach Jr.
- Pit reporters: Marty Snider, Kevin Lee, Townsend Bell, Robin Miller
- Ratings: 0.35 (overnight), 468,000 viewers

=== Round 4 – São Paulo ===
Itaipava São Paulo Indy 300 presented by Nestle

Podium Finishers
Pos	Grid	No.	Driver	Team	Laps	Time
1	1	12	(Australia) Will Power	Team Penske	75	2:08:18.2816
2	5	28	(United States) Ryan Hunter-Reay	Andretti Autosport	75	+0.9045
3	25	15	(Japan) Takuma Sato	Rahal Letterman Lanigan Racing	75	+2.3905
Race average speed: 88.945 mph (143.143 km/h)
Official Box Score: REPORT

- Date: Sunday April 29, 2012 — 11:00 a.m. EDT
- Race Name: São Paulo Indy 300
- Circuit: Streets of São Paulo
- Location: São Paulo, Brazil
- Track description: Temporary street circuit
- Track length: 2.536 miles (4.081 km)
- Distance: 75 laps / 190.200 miles (306.097 km)
- Race Report: 2012 São Paulo Indy 300

Race Summary and Statistics
- Race Summary: Will Power led 63 laps en route to his third straight IndyCar victory in 2012, and third consecutive win in São Paulo. Power took the lead at the start and led the first 51 laps. The early parts of the race were clean, but two multi-car pileups occurred on restarts in the tight chicane segment. On one of the final restarts, Takuma Sato aggressively moved into third place, taking his first podium finish in IndyCar competition. Power held off Ryan Hunter-Reay over the final 12 laps to secure the victory. Despite concerns about possible rain during the race, the skies cleared, and the race was dry, with only trace drizzle that did not affect the track.
- Pole position: #12 Will Power, 1:21.4045 sec, 112.151 mph (180.490 km/h)
- Lead changes: 5 between 5 drivers
- Lap Leaders
  - 1–51: #12 Power
  - 52: #10 Franchitti
  - 53–54: #3 Castroneves
  - 55: #27 Hinchcliffe
  - 56–63: #9 Dixon
  - 64–75: #12 Power
- Weather conditions: 79 °F (26 °C), partly cloudy
- Attendance: 31,000 grandstand seats sold out
- Cautions: 5 for 15 laps
- Caution Periods
  - 23–25: #2 Briscoe crashed in turn 10
  - 27–28: #10 Franchitti & #14 Conway contact in turn 1
  - 30–32: #78 De Silvestro crashed in turn 2, #7 Bourdais, #14 Conway, #19 Jakes, #67 Newgarden & #83 Kimball involved in contact
  - 63–66: #67 Newgarden crashed in turn 6
  - 68–70: #9 Dixon, #11 Kanaan, #14 Conway, #19 Jakes, #25 Beatriz, #26 Andretti, #38 Rahal & #77 Pagenaud contact in turn 2
Television in the United States
- Television network: NBC Sports Network
- Booth announcers: Bob Jenkins, Jon Beekhuis, Wally Dallenbach Jr.
- Pit reporters: Kevin Lee
- Ratings: 0.23 HH rating, 0.33 CVG rating, 0.46 peak at checkered flag

=== Round 5 – Indianapolis ===
96th Indianapolis 500

Top Three Finishers
Pos	Grid	No.	Driver	Team	Laps	Time
1	16	50	(United Kingdom) Dario Franchitti	Chip Ganassi Racing	200	2:58:51.2532
2	15	9	(New Zealand) Scott Dixon	Chip Ganassi Racing	200	+0.0295^{†}
3	8	11	(Brazil) Tony Kanaan	KV Racing Technology	200	+0.0677
Race average speed: 167.734 mph (269.942 km/h)
Official Box Score: REPORT

- Date: Sunday May 27, 2012 — 12:00 p.m. EDT
- Race Name: Indianapolis 500
- Circuit: Indianapolis Motor Speedway
- Location: Speedway, Indiana
- Track description: Oval
- Track length: 2.5 miles (4.0 km)
- Distance: 200 laps / 500 miles (800 km)
- Race Report: 2012 Indianapolis 500

Race Summary and Statistics
- Race Summary: The first oval race for the new Dallara DW-12 chassis saw an all-time Indy 500 record 34 lead changes during a highly competitive event. On the final lap, second place Takuma Sato attempted to pass Dario Franchitti for the lead in turn one. As the two cars were side by side, Sato pinched the car down too low, spun, and crashed into the outside wall. Franchitti slipped by unscathed to take the victory. Franchitti's teammate Scott Dixon finished second, sweeping a 1–2 finish for Chip Ganassi Racing.
- Pole position: #2 Ryan Briscoe, 2:38.9514 sec, 226.484 mph (364.491 km/h) (4-lap)
- Lead changes: 34 between 10 drivers
- Lap Leaders
  - 1: #27 Hinchcliffe
  - 2–4: #2 Briscoe
  - 5–6: #27 Hinchcliffe
  - 7–15: #2 Briscoe
  - 16–17: #27 Hinchcliffe
  - 18–19: #2 Briscoe
  - 20–21: #26 Andretti
  - 22: #2 Briscoe
  - 23–44: #26 Andretti
  - 45–46: #98 Tagliani
  - 47: #9 Dixon
  - 48–49: #83 Kimball
  - 50–73: #26 Andretti
  - 75–78: #9 Dixon
  - 79: #83 Kimball
  - 80–90: #26 Andretti
  - 91–118: #9 Dixon
  - 119–123: #15 Sato
  - 124–125: #8 Barrichello
  - 126–146: #15 Sato
  - 147: #9 Dixon
  - 148–152: #15 Sato
  - 153–159: #50 Franchitti
  - 160: #9 Dixon
  - 161–162: #50 Franchitti
  - 163–171: #9 Dixon
  - 172–173: #50 Franchitti
  - 174–176: #9 Dixon
  - 177: #50 Franchitti
  - 178: #9 Dixon
  - 179–186: #50 Franchitti
  - 187–193: #11 Kanaan
  - 194: #50 Franchitti
  - 195–198: #9 Dixon
  - 199–200: #50 Franchitti
- Weather conditions: 91 °F (33 °C), partly cloudy
- Attendance: TBA
- Cautions: 8 for 39 laps
- Caution Periods
  - 14–17: Spin: #39 Clauson in Turn 2
  - 80–86: Contact: #12 Power & #14 Conway in Turn 2
  - 90–94: Contact: #25 Beatriz in Turn 2
  - 146–151: Stall: #17 Saavedra in Turn 2
  - 164–170: Stall: #67 Newgarden in Backstretch
  - 181–183: Spin: #20 Carpenter in Turn 1
  - 188–193: Contact: #26 Andretti in Turn 1
  - 200: Contact: #15 Sato in Turn 1
Television in the United States
- Television network: ABC (race day), NBC Sports Network (time trials)
- Booth announcers:
  - NBC Sports Network (time trials): Bob Jenkins, Jon Beekhuis, Wally Dallenbach Jr.
  - ABC (race day): Marty Reid, Scott Goodyear, Eddie Cheever
- Pit reporters:
  - NBC Sports Network (time trials): Derek Daly, Kevin Lee, Townsend Bell, Robin Miller
  - ABC (race day): Jamie Little, Vince Welch, Rick DeBruhl, Jerry Punch
- Ratings: 4.1 (overnight), 1.9 (pre-race), 4.34 (Fast Nationals), 6.9 million viewers

=== Round 6 – Detroit ===
Chevrolet Detroit Belle Isle Grand Prix presented by ShopAutoWeek.com

Podium Finishers
Pos	Grid	No.	Driver	Team	Laps	Time
1	1	9	(New Zealand) Scott Dixon	Chip Ganassi Racing	60	1:27:39.5053
2	14	10	(United Kingdom) Dario Franchitti	Chip Ganassi Racing	60	+ 1.9628
3	4	77	(France) Simon Pagenaud R	Schmidt Hamilton Motorsports	60	+ 2.4773
Race average speed: 88.945 mph (143.143 km/h)
Official Box Score: REPORT

- Date: Sunday June 3, 2012 — 3:30 p.m. EDT
- Race Name: Detroit Belle Isle Grand Prix
- Circuit: Belle Isle
- Location: Detroit, Michigan
- Track description: Temporary street circuit
- Track length: 2.07 miles (3.33 km)
- Distance: 60 laps / 124.2 miles (199.9 km)
- Race Report: 2012 Chevrolet Detroit Belle Isle Grand Prix

Race Summary and Statistics
- Race Summary: Scott Dixon led wire-to-wire at Detroit, IndyCar's return to the Belle Isle circuit for the first time since 2008. Around lap 40, a tar patch of the track broke up, with chunks of pavement creating debris on the track. James Hinchcliffe ran over some of the debris, and crashed hard into the tire barrier. The race was red flagged in order to make repairs to the track surface. After over two hours, the race resumed, but race officials shortened the duration to 60 laps (down from 90). Scott Dixon led the rest of the way, while Dario Franchitti charged up to second place at the finish. The checkered flag fell just minutes before a downpour.
- Pole position: #12 Will Power, 1:21.4045 sec, 112.151 mph (180.490 km/h)
- Lead changes: none
- Lap Leaders
  - 1–60: #9 Dixon
- Weather conditions: 79 °F (26 °C), cloudy, rain
- Attendance: TBA
- Cautions: 3 for 10 laps
- Caution Periods
  - 40–44: #27 Hinchcliffe contact in turn 7, #15 Sato contact in turn 12
  - 45: Red flag for track repairs
  - 45–46: Restarting from red flag
  - 48–50: #3 Castroneves and #20 Carpenter contact in turn 6, #67 Newgarden spin
Television in the United States
- Television network: ABC, coverage switched to ESPNews at 6 p.m. EDT
- Booth announcers: Marty Reid and Scott Goodyear
- Pit reporters: Jamie Little, Vince Welch, and Rick DeBruhl
- Ratings: 0.7 overnight

=== Round 7 – Texas ===
Firestone 550

Top Three Finishers
Pos	Grid	No.	Driver	Team	Laps	Time
1	17	18	(United Kingdom) Justin Wilson	Dale Coyne Racing	228	1:59:02.0131
2	3	38	(United States) Graham Rahal	Chip Ganassi Racing	228	+ 3.9202
3	10	2	(Australia) Ryan Briscoe	Team Penske	228	+ 5.8619
Race average speed: 167.217 mph (269.110 km/h)
Official Box Score: REPORT

- Date: Saturday June 9, 2012 — 8:00 p.m. EDT
- Race Name: Firestone 550
- Circuit: Texas Motor Speedway
- Location: Fort Worth, Texas
- Track description: Oval
- Track length: 1.455 miles (2.342 km)
- Distance: 228 laps / 331.740 miles (533.884 km)
- Race Report: 2012 Firestone 550

Race Summary and Statistics
- Race Summary: After experimenting with the Twin 275s race format in 2011, the event reverted to a single 550 km (342 mi) race. The event marked the first race of the new Dallara DW-12 chassis on one of the high-banked 1.5 mile circuits. Though there was a level of apprehension entering the week (in the wake of the Las Vegas tragedy), series officials took measures to reduce downforce, lower speeds, and break up the "pack racing." The result was a highly competitive race and yielded overall positive results. Scott Dixon dominated most of the first half, leading 133 laps, and seemingly passing and pulling away at will. His Ganassi teammate Dario Franchitti, however, suffered from poor handling and after an unscheduled pit stop, fell behind and was never a factor. On lap 170, Dixon's handling started to go away, and lost the lead to Will Power. A few laps later, he got too low in turn four, and was caught up in dirty air, which caused him to spin and crash out in the exit of turn four. After the restart, Will Power led Ryan Briscoe and Tony Kanaan. Down the backstretch, the cars went three wide, and Power swerved to block the inside line. He made contact with Kanaan's front wing, and the broken wing required Kanaan to pit for repairs. A few minutes later, race director Beaux Barfield issued a blocking penalty to Power, and he was forced to serve a "drive-through" penalty in the pit lane. Graham Rahal took the lead on lap 200, and appeared on his way to his second-career IndyCar victory. He held a lead of several seconds over Justin Wilson. With three laps to go, however, Rahal slid high exiting turn four, and smacked the outside wall with the right side of the car. Rahal continued, but slowed enough that Wilson passed him for the lead down the backstretch. Wilson led the final two laps, and scored his second career IndyCar victory, and Dale Coyne's second victory as a car owner. Rahal held on to come home second.
- Pole position: #98 Alex Tagliani, 48.5695 sec, 215.691 mph (347.121 km/h) (2-lap)
- Lead changes: 9 between 7 drivers
- Lap Leaders
  - 1: 1–20: #98 Tagliani
  - 21–116: #9 Dixon
  - 117–125: #18 Wilson
  - 126–133: #9 Dixon
  - 134–141: #27 Hinchcliffe
  - 142–170: #9 Dixon
  - 171–194: #12 Power
  - 195–199: #2 Briscoe
  - 200–226: #38 Rahal
  - 227–228: #18 Wilson
- Weather conditions: 88 °F (31 °C), partly cloudy
- Attendance: 69,000
- Cautions: 4 for 32 laps
- Caution Periods
  - 31–39: #83 Kimball contact in turn 4
  - 65–70: #15 Sato crash on backstretch
  - 131–137: #5 Viso stalled
  - 174–183: #9 Dixon crash turn 4
Television in the United States
- Television network: NBC Sports Network
- Booth announcers: Bob Jenkins, Jon Beekhuis, Tommy Kendall
- Pit reporters: Kevin Lee, Townsend Bell, Robin Miller
- Ratings: 0.41 (Final), 722,000 viewers

=== Round 8 – Milwaukee ===
Milwaukee IndyFest presented by XYQ

Podium Finishers
Pos	Grid	No.	Driver	Team	Laps	Time
1	2	28	(United States) Ryan Hunter-Reay	Andretti Autosport	225	1:52:17:8119
2	6	11	(Brazil) Tony Kanaan	KV Racing Technology	225	+ 5.1029
3	8	27	(Canada) James Hinchcliffe	Andretti Autosport	225	+ 7.2715
Race average speed: 122.020 mph (196.372 km/h)
Official Box Score: REPORT

- Date: Saturday June 16, 2012 — 1:00 p.m. EDT
- Race Name: Milwaukee IndyFest
- Circuit: Milwaukee Mile
- Location: West Allis, Wisconsin
- Track description: Oval
- Track length: 1.015 miles (1.633 km)
- Distance: 225 laps / 228.375 miles (367.534 km)
- Race Report: 2012 Milwaukee IndyFest

Race Summary and Statistics
- Race Summary: Dario Franchitti sits on the pole at The Milwaukee Mile, he led eventual race winner Ryan Hunter-Reay to the green flag. The race got delayed 90 minutes due to rain. We ran the first 66 laps without a caution, until the 1st caution came out on lap 67 when Simona de Silvestro crashed in turn 4, the first restart came on lap 79. The 2nd caution came on lap 94 when Justin Wilson lost an engine in turn 1, the next restart came on lap 103 and Scott Dixon gets black flagged for jumping the restart. The 3rd caution came out on lap 108 when Takuma Sato and James Jakes crashed in turn 2, the next restart came on lap 122. The 4th caution came out when there was a couple raindrops falling on the racetrack. The next to final restart came on lap 192, and the 5th and final caution came on lap 195 when polesitter Dario Franchitti crashed in turn 3. The final restart came on lap 201. Ryan Hunter-Reay wins by 5 seconds over Tony Kanaan and James Hinchcliffe gets his best finish on an oval, he ties his career best finish. Hinchcliffe finished 3rd at the 2012 Toyota Grand Prix of Long Beach on April 15, 2012. Hunter Reay gets his first win of the season, and first win since the 2011 MoveThatBlock.com Indy 225 at New Hampshire Motor Speedway on August 15, 2011.
- Pole position: #10 Dario Franchitti, 43.3100 sec, 168.737 mph (271.556 km/h) (2-lap)
- Lead changes: 5 between 5 drivers
- Lap Leaders
  - 1–63: #10 Dario Franchitti
  - 64–68: #3 Hélio Castroneves
  - 69: #27 James Hinchcliffe
  - 70–96: #5 E. J. Viso
  - 97–141: #3 Castroneves
  - 142–225: #28 Ryan Hunter-Reay
- Weather conditions: 84F
- Attendance: TBA
- Cautions: 5 for 51 laps
- Caution Periods
  - 67–78: #78 Simona de Silvestro contact in Turn 4
  - 94–102: #18 Justin Wilson stall in Turn 1
  - 108–121: #15 Takuma Sato & #19 James Jakes contact in Turn 2, #4 J. R. Hildebrand stall in Turn 3
  - 182–191: Moisture in Turn 3
  - 195–200: #10 Dario Franchitti contact in Turn 3
Television in the United States
- Television network: ABC Sports
- Booth announcers: Marty Reid and Scott Goodyear
- Pit reporters: Rick DeBruhl, Jamie Little, and Vince Welch
- Ratings: 1.0, 1.4 million viewers

=== Round 9 – Iowa ===
Iowa Corn Indy 250

Podium Finishers
Pos	Grid	No.	Driver	Team	Laps	Time
1	7	28	(United States) Ryan Hunter-Reay	Andretti Autosport	250	1:43:39.3031
2	3	26	(United States) Marco Andretti	Andretti Autosport	250	+0.1103^{†}
3	19	11	(Brazil) Tony Kanaan	KV Racing Technology	250	+2.7248
Race average speed: 129.371 mph (208.202 km/h)
Official Box Score: REPORT

- Date: Saturday June 23, 2012 — 10:00 p.m. EDT
- Race Name: Iowa Corn Indy 250
- Circuit: Iowa Speedway
- Location: Newton, Iowa
- Track description: Oval
- Track length: 0.875 miles (1.408 km)
- Distance: 250 laps / 218.75 miles (352.04 km)
- Race Report: 2012 Iowa Corn Indy 250

Race Summary and Statistics
- Race Summary: Ryan Hunter-Reay won for the second weekend in a row, and for the second weekend in a row on a short oval. Hunter-Reay passed his teammate Marco Andretti for second place on lap 234, then took the lead from Scott Dixon four laps later. In a new format, the starting lineup was determined by three heat races. Dario Franchitti won the third and final heat race, which secured the pole position. However, he suffered an engine failure on the pace laps, and dropped out before the green flag.
- Pole position: #10 Dario Franchitti - Won qualifying heat race: REPORT
- Lead changes: 10 between 8 drivers
- Lap Leaders
  - 1–51 #3 Helio Castroneves
  - 52–70 #27 James Hinchcliffe
  - 71 #8 Rubens Barrichello
  - 72 #19 James Jakes
  - 73–154 #3 Helio Castroneves
  - 155–156 #28 Ryan Hunter-Reay
  - 157–176 #9 Scott Dixon
  - 177–178 #2 Briscoe
  - 179–181 #26 Marco Andretti
  - 182–237 #9 Scott Dixon
  - 238–250 #28 Ryan Hunter-Reay
- Weather conditions: 86F
- Attendance: TBA
- Cautions: 6 for 64 laps
- Caution Periods
  - 1–9: Stalled cars #10 Franchitti & #98 Tagliani
  - 68–83: Contact #5 Viso & #12 Power in turn 2
  - 98–110: Contact #4 Hildebrand in turn 1
  - 179–194: Contact #2 Briscoe & #67 Newgarden in turn 2
  - 197–203: Contact #27 Hunchcliffe in turn 4
  - 248–250: Contact #6 Legge in turn 2
Television in the United States
- Television network: NBC Sports Network
- Booth announcers: Bob Jenkins, Jon Beekhuis, Tommy Kendall
- Pit reporters: Marty Snider, Kevin Lee, Townsend Bell, Robin Miller
- Ratings: 0.34 (Final)

=== Round 10 – Toronto ===
Honda Indy Toronto

Podium Finishers
Pos	Grid	No.	Driver	Team	Laps	Time
1	7	28	(United States) Ryan Hunter-Reay	Andretti Autosport	85	1:33:26.5096
2	13	83	(United States) Charlie Kimball	Chip Ganassi Racing	85	+0.0757^{†}
3	11	14	(United Kingdom) Mike Conway	A. J. Foyt Enterprises	85	+0.2848
Race average speed: 0.000
Official Box Score: REPORT

- Date: Sunday July 8, 2012 — 1:00 p.m. EDT
- Race Name: Honda Indy Toronto
- Circuit: Streets of Toronto
- Location: Toronto, Ontario
- Track description: Temporary street circuit
- Track length: 1.755 miles (2.824 km)
- Distance: 85 laps / 149.175 miles (240.074 km)
- Race Report: 2012 Honda Indy Toronto

Race Summary and Statistics
- Race Summary: Dario Franchitti wins his 3rd consecutive pole in the Indycar Series, he was followed by Will Power, Justin Wilson, Sébastien Bourdais, Scott Dixon, and Ryan Hunter-Reay. We ran the first 23 laps without a caution until Graham Rahal crashed in turn 1 and lap 24. The first restart came on lap 28. We had a 52 lap green flag run, the 2nd caution came on lap 80 when rookies Simon Pagenaud and Josef Newgarden got together in turn 3, Newgarden got the worst of it, and Pagenaud eventually got a penalty for avoidable contact. The final restart came on lap 82. The 3rd and final caution came on lap 83 when Sébastien Bourdais, Rubens Barrichello, and Alex Tagliani made contact in turn 1, Dario Franchitti got into Ryan Briscoe in turn 3, and then Ed Carpenter got into Simon Pagenaud and got into Marco Andretti. The race end under caution and Ryan Hunter-Reay picks up his 3rd consecutive win the season. Hunter Reay leads by 34 points over Will Power and 46 points over Hélio Castroneves. Hunter Reay holds off Charlie Kimball, who picks up his first podium of his career, and Mike Conway, who picks up his best finish of the season. Conway gives A. J. Foyt Enterprises their first podium since Vítor Meira at the 2010 Sao Paulo Indy 300.
- Pole position: #10 Dario Franchitti, 59.3510 sec, 106.451 mph (171.316 km/h)
- Lead changes: 6 between 5 drivers
- Lap Leaders
  - 1–5 #10 Dario Franchitti
  - 6–25 #12 Will Power
  - 26–48 #77 Simon Pagenaud (R)
  - 49–55 #28 Ryan Hunter-Reay
  - 56 #4 J. R. Hildebrand
  - 57–85 #28 Ryan Hunter-Reay
- Weather conditions: 82 °F (28 °C), clear skies
- Attendance: TBA
- Cautions: 3 for 8 laps
- Caution Periods
  - 24–27: Contact #38 Rahal in turn 2
  - 80–81: Contact #67 Newgarden in turn 3
  - 83–84: Contact #7 Bourdais in turn 1; 2 Briscoe, 10 Franchitti, 20 Carpenter, 26 Andretti & 77 Pagenaud in turn 3
Television in the United States
- Television network: ABC
- Booth announcers: Marty Reid and Scott Goodyear
- Pit reporters: Jamie Little, Vince Welch, and Rick DeBruhl
- Ratings: 1.6 (Overnight), 1.3 (Final), 1,831,000 viewers

=== Round 11 – Edmonton ===
Edmonton Indy

Podium Finishers
Pos	Grid	No.	Driver	Team	Laps	Time
1	5	3	(Brazil) Hélio Castroneves	Team Penske	75	1:38:50.9294
2	3	15	(Japan) Takuma Sato	Rahal Letterman Lanigan Racing	75	+0.8367
3	17	12	(Australia) Will Power	Team Penske	75	+5.3697
Race average speed: 101.246 mph (162.940 km/h)
Official Box Score: REPORT

- Date: Sunday July 22, 2012 — 12:45 p.m. MDT (2:45 p.m. EDT)
- Race Name: Edmonton Indy
- Circuit: Edmonton City Centre Airport
- Location: Edmonton, Alberta
- Track description: Temporary circuit
- Track length: 2.224 miles (3.579 km)
- Distance: 80 laps / 177.920 miles (286.334 km)
- Race Report: 2012 Edmonton Indy

Race Summary and Statistics
- Race Summary: Hélio Castroneves held off Takuma Sato to win the Edmonton Indy, in a race that went flag-to-flag without a caution. On the final round of pit stops, Castroneves pitted on lap earlier than Sato, and when Sato exited the pits, Castroneves slipped by to take the lead in turn one. With the victory, Castroneves moved into second place in the season points standings behind Ryan Hunter-Reay. Championship contender Will Power started 17th, and notably charged all the way up to third at the finish. Power, however, slipped down to third in the season standings.
- Pole position: #28 Ryan Hunter-Reay, 1:07.2338, 103.664 mph
- Lead changes: 5 between 4 drivers
- Lap Leaders
  - 1–25: #98 Alex Tagliani
  - 26: #2 Ryan Briscoe
  - 27: #12 Will Power
  - 28–51: #98 Alex Tagliani
  - 52–53: #12 Will Power
  - 54–75: #3 Helio Castroneves
- Weather conditions: 79F
- Attendance: TBA
- Cautions: 0 for 0 laps
- Caution Periods
  - None
Television in the United States
- Television network: NBC Sports Network
- Booth announcers: Bob Jenkins, Jon Beekhuis, Wally Dallenbach Jr.
- Pit reporters: Marty Snider, Kevin Lee, Townsend Bell, Robin Miller
- Ratings: 0.48 (Final)

=== Round 12 – Mid-Ohio ===
Honda Indy 200 at Mid-Ohio

Podium Finishers
Pos	Grid	No.	Driver	Team	Laps	Time
1	4	9	(New Zealand) Scott Dixon	Chip Ganassi Racing	85	1:39:48.5083
2	1	12	(Australia) Will Power	Team Penske	85	+ 3.4619
3	3	77	(France) Simon Pagenaud R	Schmidt Hamilton Motorsports	85	+ 4.5402
Race average speed: 115.379 mph (185.685 km/h)
Official Box Score: REPORT

- Date: Sunday August 5, 2012 — 1:00 p.m. EDT
- Race Name: Honda Indy 200
- Circuit: Mid-Ohio Sports Car Course
- Location: Lexington, Ohio
- Track description: Road course
- Track length: 2.258 miles (3.634 km)
- Distance: 85 laps / 191.930 miles (308.881 km)
- Race Report: 2012 Honda Indy 200 at Mid-Ohio

Race Summary and Statistics
- Race Summary: Will Power picks up the pole at the Mid-Ohio Sports Car Course, he was followed by Dario Franchitti, Simon Pagenaud, Scott Dixon, Ryan Briscoe, and Sébastien Bourdais. For the 2nd consecutive race in row, the race goes caution free. Scott Dixon picks up his 2nd win of the season, and 4th at the Mid-Ohio Sports Car Course. Dixon was followed by Will Power and Simon Pagenaud. Will Power leads the championship by 5 points over Ryan Hunter-Reay, 26 points over Hélio Castroneves and 28 points over Scott Dixon.
- Pole position: #12 Will Power, 1:05.6474 sec, 123.825 mph (199.277 km/h)
- Lead changes: 2 between 3 drivers
- Lap Leaders
  - 1–57: #12 Power
  - 58–59: #27 Hinchcliffe
  - 60–85: #9 Dixon
- Weather conditions: 93F
- Attendance: TBA
- Cautions: 0 for 0 laps
- Caution Periods
  - None
Television in the United States
- Television network: ABC
- Booth announcers: Bob Jenkins, Jon Beekhuis, Wally Dallenbach Jr.
- Pit reporters: Marty Snider, Kevin Lee, Townsend Bell
- Ratings: 0.9, 1,301,000 viewers

=== Round 13 – Sonoma ===
GoPro Indy Grand Prix of Sonoma

Podium Finishers
Pos	Grid	No.	Driver	Team	Laps	Time
1	2	2	(Australia) Ryan Briscoe	Team Penske	85	2:07:02.8248
2	1	12	(Australia) Will Power	Team Penske	85	+0.4408
3	6	10	(United Kingdom) Dario Franchitti	Chip Ganassi Racing	85	+ 1.0497
Race average speed: 95.740 mph (154.079 km/h)
Official Box Score: REPORT

- Date: Sunday August 26, 2012 — 4:00 p.m. EDT / 1:00 p.m. PDT
- Race Name: GoPro Indy Grand Prix of Sonoma
- Circuit: Sonoma Raceway
- Location: Sonoma, California
- Track description: Road course
- Track length: 2.310 miles (3.718 km)
- Distance: 85 laps / 196.350 miles (315.995 km)
- Race Report: 2012 GoPro Indy Grand Prix of Sonoma

Race Summary and Statistics
- Race Summary: Will Power picks up his 3rd consecutive pole at Sonoma Raceway, 2nd consecutive pole of the season. He was followed by Ryan Briscoe, Sébastien Bourdais, Hélio Castroneves, Scott Dixon, and Dario Franchitti. The green waved and Championship Contenders Hélio Castroneves and Scott Dixon got together in turn 7, Dixon got the worst of it, and Castroneves gets a drive through penalty for avoidable contact. We ran the first 64 laps without a caution, until lap 65 when Sébastien Bourdais and Josef Newgarden crashed in turn 8. The next restart came on lap 74, and on lap 75 the 2nd caution came when Alex Tagliani spun Ryan Hunter-Reay in turn 7, Tagliani eventually would get penalized for avoidable contact. Ryan Hunter-Reay would get penalized for avoidable contact on E. J. Viso. Oriol Servia would get penalized for avoidable contact on Mike Conway. Ryan Briscoe holds off Will Power and Dario Franchitti to pick up his first win since the 2010 Firestone 550 at Texas Motor Speedway on June 5, 2010. Will Power leads the championship by 37 points over Ryan Hunter-Reay with 2 races left in the season.
- Pole position: #12 Will Power, 1:17.2709 sec, 111.116 mph (178.824 km/h)
- Lead changes: 6 between 3 drivers
- Lap Leaders
  - 1–17: #12 Power
  - 18–19: #2 Briscoe
  - 20: #28 Hunter-Reay
  - 21–40: #12 Power
  - 41–43: #2 Briscoe
  - 44–63: #12 Power
  - 64–85: #2 Briscoe
- Weather conditions: 79 °F (26 °C), overcast
- Attendance: TBA
- Cautions: 2 for 11 laps
- Caution Periods
  - 65–73: #7 Bourdais, #67 Newgarden crash in turn 8
  - 7–76: #28 Hunter-Reay, #98 Tagliani contact in turn 9
Television in the United States
- Television network: NBC Sports Network
- Booth announcers: Bob Jenkins, Jon Beekhuis, Wally Dallenbach Jr.
- Pit reporters: Marty Snider, Kevin Lee, Townsend Bell
- Ratings: 0.32

=== Round 14 – Baltimore ===
Grand Prix of Baltimore presented by SRT

Podium Finishers
Pos	Grid	No.	Driver	Team	Laps	Time
1	10	28	(United States) Ryan Hunter-Reay	Andretti Autosport	75	2:09:02.9522
2	11	2	(Australia) Ryan Briscoe	Team Penske	75	+1.4391
3	9	77	(France) Simon Pagenaud R	Schmidt Hamilton Motorsports	75	+ 3.0253
Race average speed: 71.136 mph (114.482 km/h)
Official Box Score: REPORT

- Date: Sunday September 2, 2012 — 1:00 p.m. EDT
- Race Name: Grand Prix of Baltimore
- Circuit: Streets of Baltimore
- Location: Baltimore, Maryland
- Track description: Temporary street circuit
- Track length: 2.040 miles (3.283 km)
- Distance: 75 laps / 153.000 miles (246.230 km)
- Race Report: 2012 Grand Prix of Baltimore

Race Summary and Statistics
- Race Summary: Will Power picks up his 3rd consecutive pole of the season. We went the first 8 laps without a full course caution. The first caution came out on lap 9 when Ed Carpenter crashed on the frontstretch, the first restart came out on lap 13. The 2nd caution came out on lap 14 when Hélio Castroneves, J. R. Hildebrand, Mike Conway, and Bruno Junqueira crashed in turn 6, the next restart came on lap 17. The 3rd caution came on lap 19 when Marco Andretti crashed in turn 1, the next restart came on lap 21. The 4th caution came on lap 22 when Dario Franchitti and Simona de Silvestro crashed in turn 1, the next restart came on lap 24. The 5th caution came on lap 33 when James Jakes crashed in turn 12, the next restart came on lap 36. The 6th caution came on lap 37 when James Hinchcliffe crashed in turn 2, the next restart came on lap 39. The 7th caution came on lap 40 when Simona de Silvestro crashed on the frontstretch, the next restart came on lap 42. The 8th caution came when Charlie Kimball had a drivetrain issue in turn 3, the next to final restart came on lap 69. The 9th and final caution came on lap 70 when Mike Conway, Justin Wilson, Marco Andretti, James Hinchcliffe, and Graham Rahal crashed in turn 4. Ryan Hunter-Reay held off Ryan Briscoe and Simon Pagenaud to pick his 4th win of the season, closing the championship gap to within 17 points behind Will Power with one race left in the season.
- Pole position: Will Power, 1:07.9750, 94.185 mph
- Lead changes: {{{leadchanges}}}
- Lap Leaders
  - {{{leaders}}}
- Weather conditions: 84F
- Attendance: TBA
- Cautions: {{{yellows}}}
- Caution Periods
  - {{{cautions}}}
Television in the United States
- Television network: TBA
- Booth announcers: TBA
- Pit reporters: TBA
- Ratings: TBA

=== Round 15 – Fontana ===
MAVTV 500 INDYCAR World Championships

Podium Finishers
Pos	Grid	No.	Driver	Team	Laps	Time
1	5	20	(United States) Ed Carpenter	Ed Carpenter Racing	250	2:57:34.7433
2	9	10	(United Kingdom) Dario Franchitti	Chip Ganassi Racing	250	+ 1.9
3	15	9	(New Zealand) Scott Dixon	Chip Ganassi Racing	250	+ 2.6
Race average speed: 168.939 mph (271.881 km/h)
Official Box Score: REPORT

- Date: Saturday September 15, 2012 — 8:30 p.m. EDT / 5:30 p.m. PDT
- Race Name: MAVTV 500
- Circuit: Auto Club Speedway
- Location: Fontana, California
- Track description: Oval
- Track length: 2.000 miles (3.219 km)
- Distance: 250 laps / 500 miles (800 km)
- Race Report: 2012 MAVTV 500 IndyCar World Championships

Race Summary and Statistics
- Race Summary: The Indycar Series broke the record for the most hottest race in the series, which it dated back the 2009 Toyota Grand Prix of Long Beach on April 19, 2009, 64 races ago. Marco Andretti picks up his first pole since The Milwaukee Mile in June 2008, 77 starts ago. Ryan Hunter-Reay and Will Power are the only 2 drivers that can win the championship. We ran the first 55 laps without a caution until Championship Contender Will Power crashed in turn 2. The first restart came on lap 65, the 2nd caution came out when Katherine Legge and Justin Wilson crashed in turn 3. The next restart came out on lap 85, the 3rd caution came out on lap 108 when Rubens Barrichello lost an engine in turn 2. The next restart came out on lap 115, and the 4th caution came out on lap 182 when Ryan Briscoe crashed in turn 4. The next restart came out on lap 189, the 5th caution came out on lap 230 when Alex Tagliani crashed in turn 4. The next restart came on lap 235, the 6th caution came on lap 241 when Tony Kanaan crashed in turn 4. The final restart came on lap 244, and the 7th and final caution came on lap 250 when Takuma Sato crashed in turn 2. Ed Carpenter passed Dario Franchitti to pick up his first win since the 2011 Kentucky Indy 300 at the Kentucky Speedway on October 2, 2011, which it dated back 15 races ago. Scott Dixon came home in 3rd place. Ryan Hunter-Reay wins the championship by 3 points over Will Power, Hunter Reay became the first American champion since 2006 with Sam Hornish Jr.
- Pole position: #26 Marco Andretti, 216.069 mph (347.729 km/h)
- Lead changes: x for x laps
- Lap Leaders
  - xx–xx: #xx xxx xxx
  - xx–xx: #xx xxx xxx
- Weather conditions: 98F
- Attendance: TBA
- Cautions: x for x laps
- Caution Periods
  - xx–xx: #xx xxx xxx
  - xx–xx: #xx xxx xxx
Television in the United States
- Television network: NBC Sports Network
- Booth announcers: Bob Jenkins, Jon Beekhuis, Tommy Kendall
- Pit reporters: Marty Snider, Kevin Lee, Townsend Bell, Robin Miller
- Ratings: 0.55, 818,000 viewers

== Points standings ==
- Ties in points broken by number of wins, followed by number of 2nds, 3rds, etc., and then by number of pole positions, followed by number of times qualified 2nd, etc.

=== Driver standings ===
- One point is awarded to any driver who leads at least one lap during a race. Two additional points are awarded to the driver who leads the most laps in a race.
- Bonus points are awarded for qualifying performance:
  - At all tracks except Indianapolis, the driver who qualifies on pole earns one point.
  - At Indianapolis, drivers who advance to Q2 earn bonus points. Drivers who qualify tenth through twenty-fourth earn four qualifying points, and the remaining qualifying drivers earn three points.

Pos	Driver	STP	BAR	LBH	SAO	INDY	BEL	TMS	MIL	IOW	TOR	EDM	MOH	SON	BAL	CAL	Pts
1	(United States) Ryan Hunter-Reay	3	12	6	2	27^{3}	7	21	1*	1	1*	**7**	24	18	1	4	468
2	(Australia) Will Power	**7**	1	1	**1***	28^{5}	4	8	12	23	15	3	**2***	**2***	**6***	24	465
3	(New Zealand) Scott Dixon	2*	2*	23	17	2^{15}	**1***	18*	11	4	25	10	1	13	4	3	435
4	(Brazil) Hélio Castroneves	1	**3**	13	4	10^{6}	17	7	6	6*	6	1	16	6	10	5	431
5	(France) Simon Pagenaud RY	6	5	2*	12	16^{23}	3	6	13	5	12	20	3	7	3	15	387
6	(Australia) Ryan Briscoe	5	14	**7**	25	**5**^{1}	16	3	14	18	19	8	7	1	2	17	370
7	(United Kingdom) Dario Franchitti	13	10	15	5	1^{16}	2	14	**19**	**25**	**17**	6	17	3	13	2	363
8	(Canada) James Hinchcliffe	4	6	3	6	6^{2}	21	4	3	17	22	12	5	26	15	13	358
9	(Brazil) Tony Kanaan	25	21	4	13	3^{8}	6	11	2	3	4	18	6	10	20	18	351
10	(United States) Graham Rahal	12	4	24	16	13^{12}	19	2	9	9	23	4	11	5	11	6	333
11	(United States) J. R. Hildebrand	19	15	5	7	14^{18}	14	5	22	22	7	21	9	8	12	11	294
12	(Brazil) Rubens Barrichello R	17	8	9	10	11^{10}	25	24	10	7	11	13	15	4	5	22	289
13	(Spain) Oriol Servià	16	13	16	11	4^{27}	5	20	4	21	5	24	25	19	7	19	287
14	(Japan) Takuma Sato	22	24	8	3	17^{19}	20	22	20	12	9	2	13	27	21	7	281
15	(United Kingdom) Justin Wilson	10	19	10	22	7^{21}	22	1	23	10	21	9	18	11	17	23	278
16	(United States) Marco Andretti	14	11	25	14	24*^{4}	11	17	15	2	16	14	8	25	14	**8**	278
17	(Canada) Alex Tagliani	15	26	21		12^{11}	10	**9**	7	16	10	5*	10	9	8	20	272
18	(United States) Ed Carpenter	18	22	14	21	21^{28}	12	12	8	8	18	22	22	20	25	1*	261
19	(United States) Charlie Kimball	9	25	18	8	8^{14}	8	23	17	11	2	19		21	18	10	260
20	(Venezuela) E. J. Viso	8	18	12	9	18^{9}	18	19	5	24	20	16	20	16	9	25	244
21	(United Kingdom) Mike Conway	20	7	22	19	29^{29}	9	16	16	20	3	11	21	14	16		233
22	(United Kingdom) James Jakes	26	16	11	15	15^{17}	23	10	21	13	8	25	19	12	24	12	232
23	(United States) Josef Newgarden R	11	17	26	23	25^{7}	15	13	25	19	13	17	12	23		16	200
24	(Switzerland) Simona de Silvestro	24	20	20	24	32^{32}	13	25	24	14	24	23	23	17	22	26	182
25	(France) Sébastien Bourdais	21	9	17	18	20^{25}	24				14	15	4	22	23		173
26	(United Kingdom) Katherine Legge R	23	23	19	26	22^{30}		15	18	15				24		9	137
27	(Colombia) Sebastián Saavedra					26^{24}								15		21	41
28	(New Zealand) Wade Cunningham R					31^{26}										14	29
29	(Brazil) Ana Beatriz				20	23^{13}											28
30	(United States) Townsend Bell					9^{20}											26
31	(Italy) Giorgio Pantano R												14				16
32	(Mexico) Michel Jourdain Jr.					19^{22}											16
33	(United States) Bryan Clauson R					30^{31}											13
34	(France) Jean Alesi R					33^{33}											13
35	(Brazil) Bruno Junqueira														19		12
Pos	Driver	STP	BAR	LBH	SAO	INDY	BEL	TMS	MIL	IOW	TOR	EDM	MOH	SON	BAL	CAL	Pts

Color	Result
Gold	Winner
Silver	2nd place
Bronze	3rd place
Green	4th & 5th place
Light Blue	6th–10th place
Dark Blue	Finished (Outside Top 10)
Purple	Did not finish
Red	Did not qualify (DNQ)
Brown	Withdrawn (Wth)
Black	Disqualified (DSQ)
White	Did Not Start (DNS)
White	Race abandoned (C)
Blank	Did not participate

**In-line notation**
**Bold**	Pole position (1 point; except Indy)
Italics	Ran fastest race lap
*	Led most race laps (2 points)
DNS	Any driver who qualifies but does not start (DNS), earns half the points had they taken part.
^{1–33}	Indy 500 qualifying results, with points as follows: 15 points for 1st 13 points for 2nd and so on down to 3 points for 25th to 33rd.
^{c}	Qualifying canceled no bonus point awarded
RY Rookie of the Year
R Rookie

=== Entrant standings ===
- Based on the entrant, used for oval qualifications order, and starting grids when qualifying is cancelled.
- Only full-time entrants, and at-large part-time entrants shown.

Pos	Driver	STP	BAR	LBH	SAO	INDY	BEL	TMS	MIL	IOW	TOR	EDM	MOH	SON	BAL	CAL	Pts
1	#28 Andretti Autosport	3	12	6	2	27^{3}	7	21	1*	1	1*	**7**	24	18	1	4	468
2	#12 Team Penske	**7**	1	1	**1***	28^{5}	4	8	12	23	15	3	**2***	**2***	**6***	24	465
3	#9 Chip Ganassi Racing	2*	2*	23	17	2^{15}	**1***	18*	11	4	25	10	1	13	4	3	435
4	#3 Team Penske	1	**3**	13	4	10^{6}	17	7	6	6*	6	1	16	6	10	5	431
5	#77 Schmidt-Hamilton Motorsports	6	5	2*	12	16^{23}	3	6	13	5	12	20	3	7	3	15	387
6	#2 Team Penske	5	14	**7**	25	**5**^{1}	16	3	14	18	19	8	7	1	2	17	370
7	#10 Chip Ganassi Racing	13	10	15	5	1^{16}	2	14	**19**	**25**	**17**	6	17	3	13	2	363
8	#27 Andretti Autosport	4	6	3	6	6^{2}	21	4	3	17	22	12	5	26	15	13	358
9	#11 KV Racing Technology with SH	25	21	4	13	3^{8}	6	11	2	3	4	18	6	10	20	18	351
10	#38 Chip Ganassi Racing	12	4	24	16	13^{12}	19	2	9	9	23	4	11	5	11	6	333
11	#4 Panther Racing	19	15	5	7	14^{18}	14	5	22	22	7	21	9	8	12	11	294
12	#8 KV Racing Technology	17	8	9	10	11^{10}	25	24	10	7	11	13	15	4	5	22	289
13	#22 Panther/Dreyer & Reinbold Racing	16	13	16	11	4^{27}	5	20	4	21	5	24	25	19	7	19	282^{1}
14	#15 Rahal Letterman Lanigan Racing	22	24	8	3	17^{19}	20	22	20	12	9	2	13	27	21	7	281
15	#26 Andretti Autosport	14	11	25	14	24*^{4}	11	17	15	2	16	14	8	25	14	**8**	278
16	#83 Chip Ganassi Racing	9	25	18	8	8^{14}	8	23	17	11	2	19	14	21	18	10	276
17	#18 Dale Coyne Racing	10	19	10	22	7^{21}	22	1	23	10	21	9	18	11	17	23	273^{2}
18	#98 Bryan Herta Autosport w/ Curb-Agajanian	15	26	21		12^{11}	10	**9**	7	16	10	5*	10	9	8	20	272
19	#20 Ed Carpenter Racing	18	22	14	21	21^{28}	12	12	8	8	18	22	22	20	25	1*	260^{3}
20	#5 KV Racing Technology	8	18	12	9	18^{9}	18	19	5	24	20	16	20	16	9	25	244
21	#14 A. J. Foyt Racing	20	7	22	19	29^{29}	9	16	16	20	3	11	21	14	16	14	239^{4}
22	#19 Dale Coyne Racing	26	16	11	15	15^{17}	23	10	21	13	8	25	19	12	24	12	232
23	#67 Sarah Fisher Hartman Racing	11	17	26	23	25^{7}	15	13	25	19	13	17	12	23	19	16	212
24	#78 Lotus–HVM Racing	24	20	20	24	32^{32}	13	25	24	14	24	23	23	17	22	26	182
25	#7 Dragon Racing	21	9	17	18	20^{25}	24				14	15	4	22	23		173
26	#6 Dragon Racing	23	23	19	26	22^{30}		15	18	15				24		9	137
Pos	Driver	STP	BAR	LBH	SAO	INDY	BEL	TMS	MIL	IOW	TOR	EDM	MOH	SON	BAL	CAL	Pts

1. The #22 entry was penalized 5 points for a post-race technical infraction at Indianapolis.
2. The #18 entry was penalized 5 points for a post-race technical infraction at Texas.
3. The #20 entry was penalized 1 point for a post-race technical infraction at Texas.
4. The #14 entry was penalized 10 points for a post-race technical infraction at Toronto

=== Manufacturers' Championship ===
Pos	Manufacturer	STP	BAR	LBH	SAO	INDY	BEL	TMS	MIL	IOW	TOR	EDM	MOH	SON	BAL	CAL	Pts
1	Chevrolet	1	1	1	1	3	4	3	1	1	1	1	2	1	1	1	123
2	Honda	2	2	2	3	1	1	1	7	4	2	2	1	3	3	2	102
3	Lotus	15	9	16	11	32	13	DNS	24	14	24	23	23	17	22	26	60
Pos	Manufacturer	STP	BAR	LBH	SAO	INDY	BEL	TMS	MIL	IOW	TOR	EDM	MOH	SON	BAL	CAL	Pts

Color	Result	Points
Gold	1st place	9
Silver	2nd place	6
Bronze	3rd place	4

- Manufacturers' Championship points are awarded based on the finishing position of the highest finishing car of each respective manufacturer at each round.

== Broadcasting ==
For 2012, as in recent years, the IndyCar Series schedule split its television coverage between ESPN on ABC and NBC Sports Network (formerly Versus). The season finale returned to NBC Sports Network after airing on ABC in 2011.

As a result of logistics, NBC Sports Network aired 2012 Summer Olympics coverage during the time and ESPN's broadcast and production crew were working the NASCAR Nationwide Series U.S. Cellular 250 during a split race weekend for the two NASCAR national series), the August 5 race at Mid Ohio that aired on ABC used the NBC Sports Network crew.

In addition to qualifying and race broadcasts, NBC Sports Network aired IndyCar 36, a documentary series based on NBC's 36 format. Each 30-minute episode features a driver's race weekend. The drivers selected were:

- Tony Kanaan (St. Petersburg)
- Graham Rahal (Barber)
- Ryan Hunter-Reay (Long Beach)
- J. R. Hildebrand (Indianapolis qualifying)
- Hélio Castroneves (Indianapolis 500-Mile Race)
- Charlie Kimball (Texas)
- Ed Carpenter (Iowa)
- James Hinchcliffe (Toronto)
- Simon Pagenaud (Mid-Ohio)
- Will Power (Sonoma)
- Oriol Servià (Baltimore)
- Josef Newgarden (Fontana)

No shows were produced at São Paulo, Detroit, Milwaukee or Edmonton, whereas frontrunners Ryan Briscoe, Dario Franchitti and Scott Dixon were not featured.
