= 2012 Honda Indy 200 at Mid-Ohio =

(United States) 2012 Honda Indy 200
Race details
- 12th round of the 2012 IndyCar Series season
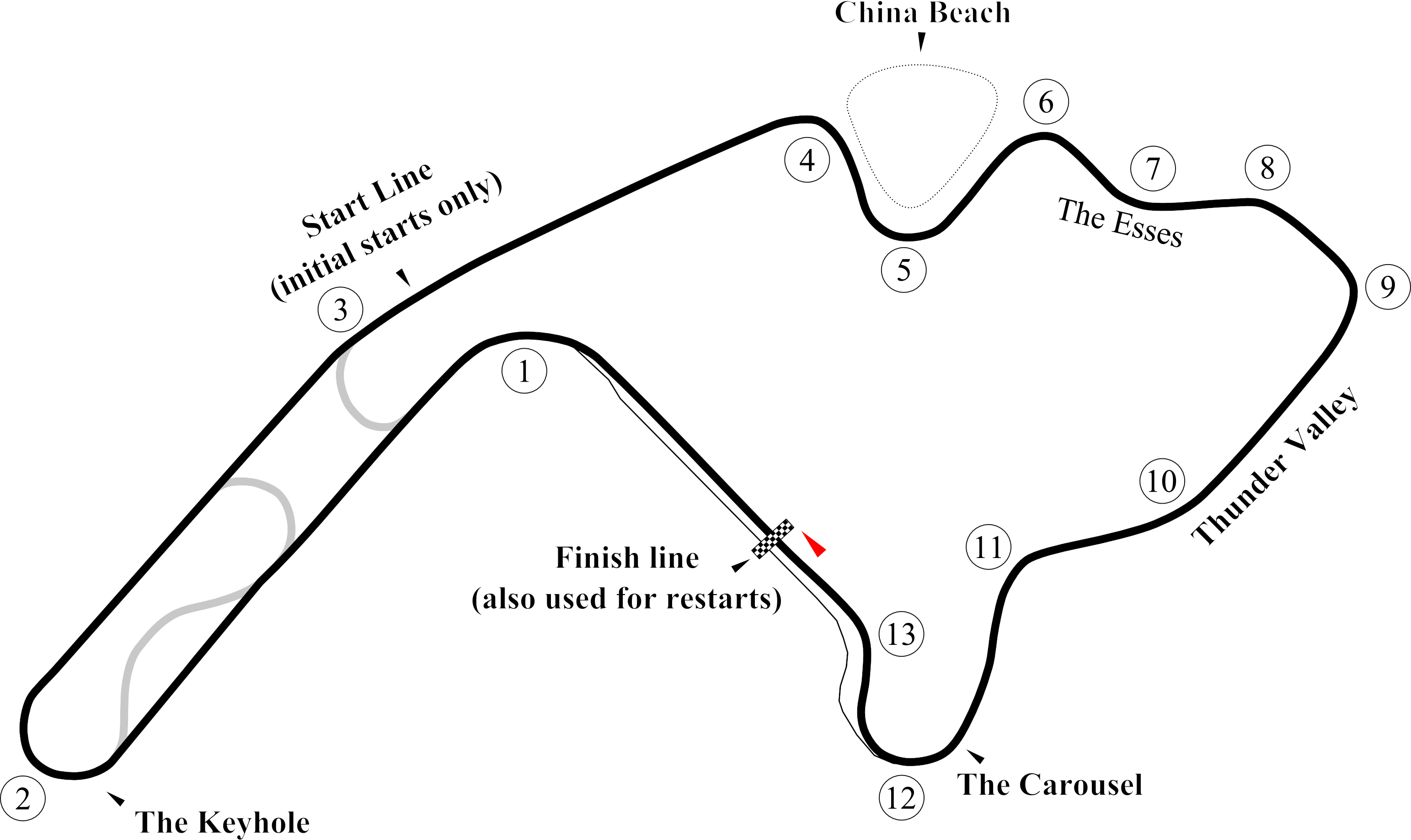
- Date: August 5, 2012
- Official name: Honda 200
- Location: Mid-Ohio Sports Car Course
- Course: Permanent racing facility 2.258 mi / 3.634 km
- Distance: 85 laps 191.930 mi / 308.881 km
- Weather: Temperatures reaching up to 93 °F (34 °C); wind speeds reaching up to 18.1 miles per hour (29.1 km/h)

Pole position
- Driver: (Australia) Will Power (Team Penske)
- Time: 1:05.6474

Fastest lap
- Driver: (Spain) Oriol Servia (Panther/Dreyer & Reinbold Racing)
- Time: 1:07.1757 (on lap 66 of 85)

Podium
- First: (New Zealand) Scott Dixon (Chip Ganassi Racing)
- Second: (Australia) Will Power (Team Penske)
- Third: (France) Simon Pagenaud (Schmidt Hamilton Motorsports)

The Honda Indy 200 at Mid-Ohio was the twelfth round of the 2012 IndyCar Series season. It took place on Sunday, August 5, 2012. The race was contested over 85 laps at the 2.258-mile (3.634 km) permanent road course at Mid-Ohio Sports Car Course in Lexington, Ohio, United States.

The race was won by New Zealand racer Scott Dixon racing for Chip Ganassi Racing. Dixon finished 3.4 seconds ahead of Australian driver Will Power driving for Team Penske with Frenchman Simon Pagenaud finishing third for Schmidt Hamilton Motorsports. It was Dixon's second win for the year and Pagenaud's third top three finish for the year. More significant, Power's second place compared to the results for Ryan Hunter-Reay and Power's teammate Hélio Castroneves, put Power back into the lead of the championship.

== Classification ==
=== Race results ===
Pos	No.	Driver	Team	Engine	Laps	Time/Retired	Grid	Laps Led	Points^{1}
1	9	(New Zealand) Scott Dixon	Chip Ganassi Racing	Honda	85	1:39:48.5083	4	26	50
2	12	(Australia) Will Power	Team Penske	Chevrolet	85	+ 3.4619	1	57	43
3	77	(France) Simon Pagenaud (R)	Schmidt Hamilton Motorsports	Honda	85	+ 4.5402	3	0	35
4	7	(France) Sébastien Bourdais	Dragon Racing	Chevrolet	85	+ 5.5822	6	0	32
5	27	(Canada) James Hinchcliffe	Andretti Autosport	Chevrolet	85	+ 7.5663	15	2	30
6	11	(Brazil) Tony Kanaan	KV Racing Technology	Chevrolet	85	+ 12.3280	18	0	28
7	2	(Australia) Ryan Briscoe	Team Penske	Chevrolet	85	+ 27.9601	5	0	26
8	26	(United States) Marco Andretti	Andretti Autosport	Chevrolet	85	+ 28.1691	8	0	24
9	4	(United States) J. R. Hildebrand	Panther Racing	Chevrolet	85	+ 29.2325	12	0	22
10	98	(Canada) Alex Tagliani	Team Barracuda – BHA	Honda	85	+ 31.1722	14	0	20
11	38	(United States) Graham Rahal	Chip Ganassi Racing	Honda	85	+ 31.4387	21	0	19
12	67	(United States) Josef Newgarden (R)	Sarah Fisher Hartman Racing	Honda	85	+ 32.0754	9	0	18
13	15	(Japan) Takuma Sato	Rahal Letterman Lanigan Racing	Honda	85	+ 32.4073	17	0	17
14	83	(Italy) Giorgio Pantano (R)	Chip Ganassi Racing	Honda	85	+ 33.9166	24	0	16
15	8	(Brazil) Rubens Barrichello	KV Racing Technology	Chevrolet	85	+ 35.2863	13	0	15
16	3	(Brazil) Hélio Castroneves	Team Penske	Chevrolet	85	+ 35.9205	23	0	14
17	10	(United Kingdom) Dario Franchitti	Chip Ganassi Racing	Honda	85	+ 36.9834	2	0	13
18	18	(United Kingdom) Justin Wilson	Dale Coyne Racing	Honda	85	+ 42.0974	11	0	12
19	19	(United Kingdom) James Jakes	Dale Coyne Racing	Honda	85	+ 46.4304	20	0	12
20	5	(Venezuela) E. J. Viso	KV Racing Technology	Chevrolet	85	+ 46.8068	19	0	12
21	14	(United Kingdom) Mike Conway	A. J. Foyt Enterprises	Honda	85	+ 46.9535	16	0	12
22	20	(United States) Ed Carpenter	Ed Carpenter Racing	Chevrolet	84	+ 1 lap	25	0	12
23	78	(Switzerland) Simona de Silvestro	HVM Racing	Lotus	83	+ 2 laps	22	0	12
24	28	(United States) Ryan Hunter-Reay	Andretti Autosport	Chevrolet	79	Mechanical	7	0	12
25	22	(Spain) Oriol Servià	Panther/Dreyer & Reinbold Racing	Chevrolet	78	+ 7 laps	10	0	10
OFFICIAL BOX SCORE

Notes

^{1} Points include 1 point for pole position and 2 points for most laps led.

== Standings after the race ==
Drivers' Championship

Pos	Driver	Points
1	(Australia) Will Power	379
2	(United States) Ryan Hunter-Reay	374
3	(Brazil) Hélio Castroneves	353
4	(New Zealand) Scott Dixon	351
5	(Canada) James Hinchcliffe	316

Manufacturers' Championship

Pos	Manufacturer	Points
1	(United States) Chevrolet	96
2	(Japan) Honda	84
3	(United Kingdom) Lotus	48

- Note: Only the top five positions are included for the driver standings.

Previous race: 2012 Edmonton Indy	IZOD IndyCar Series; 2012 season	Next race: 2012 GoPro Indy Grand Prix of Sonoma
Previous race: 2011 Honda Indy 200	Honda Indy 200	Next race: 2013 Honda Indy 200 at Mid-Ohio
