= 2012 Firestone 550 =

(United States) 2012 Firestone 550
Race details
- 7th round of the 2012 IndyCar Series season
- Date: June 9, 2012
- Official name: Firestone 550
- Location: Texas Motor Speedway
- Course: Permanent racing facility 1.5 mi / 2.4 km
- Distance: 228 laps 342 mi / 550 km
- Weather: Temperatures reaching up to 91 °F (33 °C); wind speeds up to 15 miles per hour (24 km/h)

Pole position
- Driver: (Canada) Alex Tagliani (Team Barracuda - BHA)
- Time: 0:48.5695

Fastest lap
- Driver: (Australia) Ryan Briscoe (Team Penske)
- Time: 24.5170 (on lap 141 of 228)

Podium
- First: (United Kingdom) Justin Wilson (Dale Coyne Racing)
- Second: (United States) Graham Rahal (Chip Ganassi Racing)
- Third: (Australia) Ryan Briscoe (Team Penske)

The 2012 Firestone 550 was the twenty-second running of the Firestone 550 and the seventh round of the 2012 IndyCar Series season. It took place on Saturday, June 9, 2012. The race was contested over 228 laps at the 1.5-mile (2.4 km) Texas Motor Speedway in Fort Worth, Texas, and was telecasted by NBC Sports in the United States.

The reigning champion of the Firestone 550 was Ryan Briscoe, who won the 2010 race, as in 2011 the event contested over two races in one night, making it the Firestone Twin 275s. The race was won by Justin Wilson of Dale Coyne Racing.

== Classification ==
=== Starting grid ===
Row	Inside		Outside	
1	98	(Canada) Alex Tagliani	10	(United Kingdom) Dario Franchitti
2	38	(United States) Graham Rahal	9	(New Zealand) Scott Dixon
3	12	(Australia) Will Power	27	(Canada) James Hinchcliffe
4	11	(Brazil) Tony Kanaan	26	(United States) Marco Andretti
5	77	(France) Simon Pagenaud (R)	2	(Australia) Ryan Briscoe
6	22	(Spain) Oriol Servià	8	(Brazil) Rubens Barrichello
7	28	(United States) Ryan Hunter-Reay	5	(Venezuela) E. J. Viso
8	3	(Brazil) Hélio Castroneves	83	(United States) Charlie Kimball
9	18	(United Kingdom) Justin Wilson	14	(United Kingdom) Mike Conway ^{†}
10	20	(United States) Ed Carpenter	15	(Japan) Takuma Sato ^{†}
11	19	(United Kingdom) James Jakes	6	(United Kingdom) Katherine Legge (R)
12	4	(United States) J. R. Hildebrand	78	(Switzerland) Simona de Silvestro ^{†}
13	67	(United States) Josef Newgarden (R) ^{†}		
^{†} Conway, Sato, de Silvestro, and Newgarden penalised 10 places for changing engine

=== Race results ===
Pos	No.	Driver	Team	Engine	Laps	Time/Retired	Grid	Laps Led	Points^{1}
1	18	(United Kingdom) Justin Wilson	Dale Coyne Racing	Honda	228	1:59:02.0131	17	11	50
2	38	(United States) Graham Rahal	Chip Ganassi Racing	Honda	228	+ 3.9202	3	27	40
3	2	(Australia) Ryan Briscoe	Team Penske	Chevrolet	228	+ 5.8619	10	5	35
4	27	(Canada) James Hinchcliffe	Andretti Autosport	Chevrolet	228	+ 10.4511	6	8	32
5	4	(United States) J. R. Hildebrand	Panther Racing	Chevrolet	228	+ 18.7749	23	0	30
6	77	(France) Simon Pagenaud (R)	Schmidt Hamilton Motorsports	Honda	228	+ 21.3883	9	0	28
7	3	(Brazil) Hélio Castroneves	Team Penske	Chevrolet	227	+ 1 lap	15	0	26
8	12	(Australia) Will Power	Team Penske	Chevrolet	227	+ 1 lap	5	24	24
9	98	(Canada) Alex Tagliani	Team Barracuda – BHA	Honda	227	+ 1 lap	1	20	23
10	19	(United Kingdom) James Jakes	Dale Coyne Racing	Honda	227	+ 1 lap	21	0	20
11	11	(Brazil) Tony Kanaan	KV Racing Technology	Chevrolet	227	+ 1 lap	7	0	19
12	20	(United States) Ed Carpenter	Ed Carpenter Racing	Chevrolet	227	+ 1 lap	19	0	18
13	67	(United States) Josef Newgarden (R)	Sarah Fisher Hartman Racing	Honda	226	+ 2 laps	25	0	17
14	10	(United Kingdom) Dario Franchitti	Chip Ganassi Racing	Honda	225	+ 3 laps	2	0	16
15	6	(United Kingdom) Katherine Legge (R)	Dragon Racing	Chevrolet	224	+ 4 laps	22	0	15
16	14	(United Kingdom) Mike Conway	A. J. Foyt Enterprises	Honda	224	+ 4 laps	18	0	14
17	26	(United States) Marco Andretti	Andretti Autosport	Chevrolet	222	+ 6 laps	8	0	13
18	9	(New Zealand) Scott Dixon	Chip Ganassi Racing	Honda	173	Contact	4	133	14
19	5	(Venezuela) E. J. Viso	KV Racing Technology	Chevrolet	129	Mechanical	14	0	12
20	22	(Spain) Oriol Servià	Panther/Dreyer & Reinbold Racing	Chevrolet	89	Fuel Pressure	11	0	12
21	28	(United States) Ryan Hunter-Reay	Andretti Autosport	Chevrolet	66	Mechanical	13	0	12
22	15	(Japan) Takuma Sato	Rahal Letterman Lanigan Racing	Honda	63	Contact	20	0	12
23	83	(United States) Charlie Kimball	Chip Ganassi Racing	Honda	29	Contact	16	0	12
DNS	8	(Brazil) Rubens Barrichello	KV Racing Technology	Chevrolet	0	Did Not Start^{†}	12	0	6
DNS	78	(Switzerland) Simona de Silvestro	HVM Racing	Lotus	0	Did Not Start^{†}	24	0	5
^{†} Barrichello and de Silvestro did not start the race due to fuel pump issues

Notes

^{1} Points include 1 point for pole position and 2 points for most laps led.

== Standings after the race ==
Drivers' Championship

Pos	Driver	Points
1	(Australia) Will Power	256
2	(New Zealand) Scott Dixon	220
3	(Canada) James Hinchcliffe	208
4	(Brazil) Hélio Castroneves	203
5	(France) Simon Pagenaud (R)	199

Manufacturers' Championship

Pos	Manufacturer	Points
1	(United States) Chevrolet	54
2	(Japan) Honda	51
3	(United Kingdom) Lotus	28

- Note: Only the top five positions are included for the driver standings.

Previous race: 2012 Chevrolet Detroit Belle Isle Grand Prix	IZOD IndyCar Series; 2012 season	Next race: 2012 Milwaukee IndyFest
Previous race: 2011 Firestone Twin 275s	Firestone 550	Next race: 2013 Firestone 550
