= 2012 São Paulo Indy 300 =

(Brazil) 2012 Streets of São Paulo
Race details
- 4th round of the 2012 IndyCar Series season
- Date: April 29, 2012
- Official name: Itaipava São Paulo Indy 300 presented by Nestlé
- Location: Santana – São Paulo city
- Course: Temporary street circuit 2.536 mi / 4.081 km
- Distance: 75 laps 190.200 mi / 306.097 km
- Weather: 79 °F (26 °C), partly cloudy

Pole position
- Driver: (Australia) Will Power (Team Penske)
- Time: 1:21.4045

Fastest lap
- Driver: (United States) Josef Newgarden (Sarah Fisher Hartman Racing)
- Time: 1:22.6313 (on lap 58 of 75)

Podium
- First: (Australia) Will Power (Team Penske)
- Second: (United States) Ryan Hunter-Reay (Andretti Autosport)
- Third: (Japan) Takuma Sato (Rahal Letterman Lanigan Racing)

The Itaipava São Paulo Indy 300 presented by Nestlé was the fourth race of the 2012 IZOD IndyCar Series season. The race took place on April 29, 2012, on the 2.536-mile (4.081 km) temporary street circuit in São Paulo, Brazil, and was telecasted by the NBC Sports Network in the United States and TV Bandeirantes in Brazil.

The winner was Will Power.

== Classification ==
=== Starting grid ===
Row	Inside		Outside	
1	12	(Australia) Will Power	10	(United Kingdom) Dario Franchitti
2	9	(New Zealand) Scott Dixon	27	(Canada) James Hinchcliffe
3	28	(United States) Ryan Hunter-Reay	38	(United States) Graham Rahal
4	14	(United Kingdom) Mike Conway	67	(United States) Josef Newgarden (R)
5	2	(Australia) Ryan Briscoe	26	(United States) Marco Andretti
6	11	(Brazil) Tony Kanaan	8	(Brazil) Rubens Barrichello
7	5	(Venezuela) E. J. Viso	4	(United States) J. R. Hildebrand
8	83	(United States) Charlie Kimball	77	(France) Simon Pagenaud (R)
9	19	(United Kingdom) James Jakes	7	(France) Sébastien Bourdais
10	3	(Brazil) Hélio Castroneves	25	(Brazil) Ana Beatriz
11	20	(United States) Ed Carpenter	78	(Switzerland) Simona de Silvestro
12	22	(Spain) Oriol Servià	6	(United States) Katherine Legge (R) ^{†}
13	15	(Japan) Takuma Sato ^{†}	18	(United Kingdom) Justin Wilson ^{‡}
^{†} Legge and Sato penalised 10 places for changing engine
^{‡} Wilson placed at rear of grid after failing post-qualifying technical inspection

=== Race results ===
Pos	No.	Driver	Team	Engine	Laps	Time/Retired	Grid	Laps Led	Points^{1}
1	12	(Australia) Will Power	Team Penske	Chevrolet	75	2:08:18.2816	1	63	53
2	28	(United States) Ryan Hunter-Reay	Andretti Autosport	Chevrolet	75	+ 0.9045	5	0	40
3	15	(Japan) Takuma Sato	Rahal Letterman Lanigan Racing	Honda	75	+ 2.3905	25	0	35
4	3	(Brazil) Hélio Castroneves	Team Penske	Chevrolet	75	+ 4.5489	18	2	32
5	10	(United Kingdom) Dario Franchitti	Chip Ganassi Racing	Honda	75	+ 5.1722	2	1	30
6	27	(Canada) James Hinchcliffe	Andretti Autosport	Chevrolet	75	+ 6.2615	4	1	28
7	4	(United States) J. R. Hildebrand	Panther Racing	Chevrolet	75	+ 8.3764	14	0	26
8	83	(United States) Charlie Kimball	Chip Ganassi Racing	Honda	75	+ 8.5905	15	0	24
9	5	(Venezuela) E. J. Viso	KV Racing Technology	Chevrolet	75	+ 10.3449	13	0	22
10	8	(Brazil) Rubens Barrichello	KV Racing Technology	Chevrolet	75	+ 10.8477	12	0	20
11	22	(Spain) Oriol Servià	Dreyer & Reinbold Racing	Lotus	75	+ 24.4771	23	0	19
12	77	(France) Simon Pagenaud (R)	Schmidt Hamilton Motorsports	Honda	74	+ 1 lap	16	0	18
13	11	(Brazil) Tony Kanaan	KV Racing Technology	Chevrolet	74	+1 lap	11	0	17
14	26	(United States) Marco Andretti	Andretti Autosport	Chevrolet	74	+ 1 lap	10	0	16
15	19	(United Kingdom) James Jakes	Dale Coyne Racing	Honda	74	+ 1 lap	17	0	15
16	38	(United States) Graham Rahal	Chip Ganassi Racing	Honda	74	+ 1 lap	6	0	14
17	9	(New Zealand) Scott Dixon	Chip Ganassi Racing	Honda	74	+ 1 lap	3	8	13
18	7	(France) Sébastien Bourdais	Dragon Racing	Lotus	74	+ 1 lap	22	0	12
19	14	(United Kingdom) Mike Conway	A. J. Foyt Enterprises	Honda	73	+ 2 laps	7	0	12
20	25	(Brazil) Ana Beatriz	Andretti Autosport	Chevrolet	73	+ 2 laps	19	0	12
21	20	(United States) Ed Carpenter	Ed Carpenter Racing	Chevrolet	72	+ 3 laps	20	0	12
22	18	(United Kingdom) Justin Wilson	Dale Coyne Racing	Honda	66	Mechanical	26	0	12
23	67	(United States) Josef Newgarden (R)	Sarah Fisher Hartman Racing	Honda	61	Contact	8	0	12
24	78	(Switzerland) Simona de Silvestro	HVM Racing	Lotus	28	Contact	21	0	12
25	2	(Australia) Ryan Briscoe	Team Penske	Chevrolet	21	Contact	9	0	10
26	6	(United Kingdom) Katherine Legge (R)	Dragon Racing	Lotus	20	Contact	24	0	10

Notes

^{1} Points include 1 point for pole position and 2 points for most laps led.

== Standings after the race ==
Drivers' Championship

Pos	Driver	Points
1	(Australia) Will Power	180
2	(Brazil) Hélio Castroneves	135
3	(Canada) James Hinchcliffe	123
4	(United States) Ryan Hunter-Reay	121
5	(France) Simon Pagenaud (R)	118

Manufacturers' Championship

Pos	Manufacturer	Points
1	(United States) Chevrolet	36
2	(Japan) Honda	24
3	(United Kingdom) Lotus	16

- Note: Only the top five positions are included for the driver standings.

Previous race: 2012 Toyota Grand Prix of Long Beach	IZOD IndyCar Series; 2012 season	Next race: 2012 Indianapolis 500
Previous race: 2011 São Paulo Indy 300	São Paulo Indy 300	Next race: 2013 São Paulo Indy 300
