= 2012 GoPro Indy Grand Prix of Sonoma =

(United States) 2012 Indy Grand Prix of Sonoma
Race details
- 13th round of the 2012 IndyCar Series season
- Date: August 26, 2012
- Official name: GoPro Indy Grand Prix of Sonoma
- Location: Sonoma Raceway
- Course: Permanent racing facility 2.303 mi / 3.706 km
- Distance: 85 laps 195.755 mi / 315.010 km
- Weather: Temperatures reaching up to 75 °F (24 °C); wind speeds up to 17.1 miles per hour (27.5 km/h)

Pole position
- Driver: (Australia) Will Power (Team Penske)
- Time: 1:17.2709

Fastest lap
- Driver: (United States) Ryan Hunter-Reay (Andretti Autosport)
- Time: 1:19.1848 (on lap 82 of 85)

Podium
- First: (Australia) Ryan Briscoe (Team Penske)
- Second: (Australia) Will Power (Team Penske)
- Third: (United Kingdom) Dario Franchitti (Chip Ganassi Racing)

The GoPro Indy Grand Prix of Sonoma was an open-wheel IndyCar motor race and held as the fourteenth and penultimate round of the 2012 IndyCar Series season. It took place on Sunday, August 26, 2012. The race was contested over 85 laps at the 2.303-mile (3.706 km) at Sonoma Raceway, California, United States.

The race was won by Australian racer Ryan Briscoe racing for Team Penske. Briscoe finished 0.4 seconds ahead of Australian team mate Will Power with British driver Dario Franchitti finishing third for Chip Ganassi Racing. It was Briscoe's first win since the 2010 Firestone 550, and also his last win in IndyCar. Brazilian driver and Formula One veteran Rubens Barrichello finished fourth in his best result since joining IndyCar. Power's second place, coupled with Ryan Hunter-Reay finishing 18th expanded Power's lead in the championship. Power led Hunter-Reay by 36 points.

The event marked a notable change in the course layout. The cars used the inner loop at the back hairpin instead of the outer loop in order to open a passing zone. The exit of the bus stop was widened to allow for more room. Another passing zone was established by using a part of the hairpin instead of cutting it off altogether.

== Classification ==
=== Race results ===
Pos	No.	Driver	Team	Engine	Laps	Time/Retired	Grid	Laps Led	Points^{1}
1	2	(Australia) Ryan Briscoe	Team Penske	Chevrolet	85	2:07:02.8248	2	27	50
2	12	(Australia) Will Power	Team Penske	Chevrolet	85	+ 0.4408	1	57	43
3	10	(United Kingdom) Dario Franchitti	Chip Ganassi Racing	Honda	85	+ 1.0497	6	0	35
4	8	(Brazil) Rubens Barrichello	KV Racing Technology	Chevrolet	85	+ 8.8529	11	0	32
5	38	(United States) Graham Rahal	Chip Ganassi Racing	Honda	85	+ 9.4667	13	0	30
6	3	(Brazil) Hélio Castroneves	Team Penske	Chevrolet	85	+ 11.2575	4	0	28
7	77	(France) Simon Pagenaud (R)	Schmidt Hamilton Motorsports	Honda	85	+ 12.3087	9	0	26
8	4	(United States) J. R. Hildebrand	Panther Racing	Chevrolet	85	+ 22.8121	15	0	24
9	98	(Canada) Alex Tagliani	Team Barracuda – BHA	Honda	85	+ 39.6868	8	0	22
10	11	(Brazil) Tony Kanaan	KV Racing Technology	Chevrolet	84	+ 1 lap	16	0	20
11	18	(United Kingdom) Justin Wilson	Dale Coyne Racing	Honda	84	+ 1 lap	20	0	19
12	19	(United Kingdom) James Jakes	Dale Coyne Racing	Honda	84	+ 1 lap	24	0	18
13	9	(New Zealand) Scott Dixon	Chip Ganassi Racing	Honda	84	+ 1 lap	5	0	17
14	14	(United Kingdom) Mike Conway	A. J. Foyt Enterprises	Honda	84	+ 1 lap	14	0	16
15	17	(Colombia) Sebastián Saavedra	Andretti Autosport	Chevrolet	84	+ 1 lap	23	0	15
16	5	(Venezuela) E. J. Viso	KV Racing Technology	Chevrolet	84	+ 1 lap	17	0	14
17	78	(Switzerland) Simona de Silvestro	HVM Racing	Lotus	84	+ 1 lap	27	0	13
18	28	(United States) Ryan Hunter-Reay	Andretti Autosport	Chevrolet	84	+ 1 lap	7	1	12
19	22	(Spain) Oriol Servià	Panther/Dreyer & Reinbold Racing	Chevrolet	84	+ 1 lap	18	0	12
20	20	(United States) Ed Carpenter	Ed Carpenter Racing	Chevrolet	84	+ 1 lap	25	0	12
21	83	(United States) Charlie Kimball	Chip Ganassi Racing	Honda	82	+ 3 laps	21	0	12
22	7	(France) Sébastien Bourdais	Dragon Racing	Chevrolet	63	Contact	3	0	12
23	67	(United States) Josef Newgarden (R)	Sarah Fisher Hartman Racing	Honda	62	Contact	22	0	12
24	6	(United Kingdom) Katherine Legge (R)	Dragon Racing	Chevrolet	48	Mechanical	19	0	12
25	26	(United States) Marco Andretti	Andretti Autosport	Chevrolet	46	Mechanical	12	0	10
26	27	(Canada) James Hinchcliffe	Andretti Autosport	Chevrolet	35	Mechanical	10	0	10
27	15	(Japan) Takuma Sato	Rahal Letterman Lanigan Racing	Honda	2	Mechanical	26	0	10
OFFICIAL BOX SCORE

Notes

^{1} Points include 1 point for pole position and 2 points for most laps led.

== Standings after the race ==
Drivers' Championship

Pos	Driver	Points
1	(Australia) Will Power	422
2	(United States) Ryan Hunter-Reay	386
3	(Brazil) Hélio Castroneves	381
4	(New Zealand) Scott Dixon	368
5	(France) Simon Pagenaud	337

Manufacturers' Championship

Pos	Manufacturer	Points
1	(United States) Chevrolet	105
2	(Japan) Honda	90
3	(United Kingdom) Lotus	52

- Note: Only the top five positions are included for the driver standings.

Previous race: 2012 Honda Indy 200 at Mid-Ohio	IZOD IndyCar Series; 2012 season	Next race: 2012 Grand Prix of Baltimore
Previous race: 2011 Indy Grand Prix of Sonoma	GoPro Indy Grand Prix of Sonoma	Next race: 2013 GoPro Indy Grand Prix of Sonoma
