= Jay Howard =

British racing driver (born 1981)

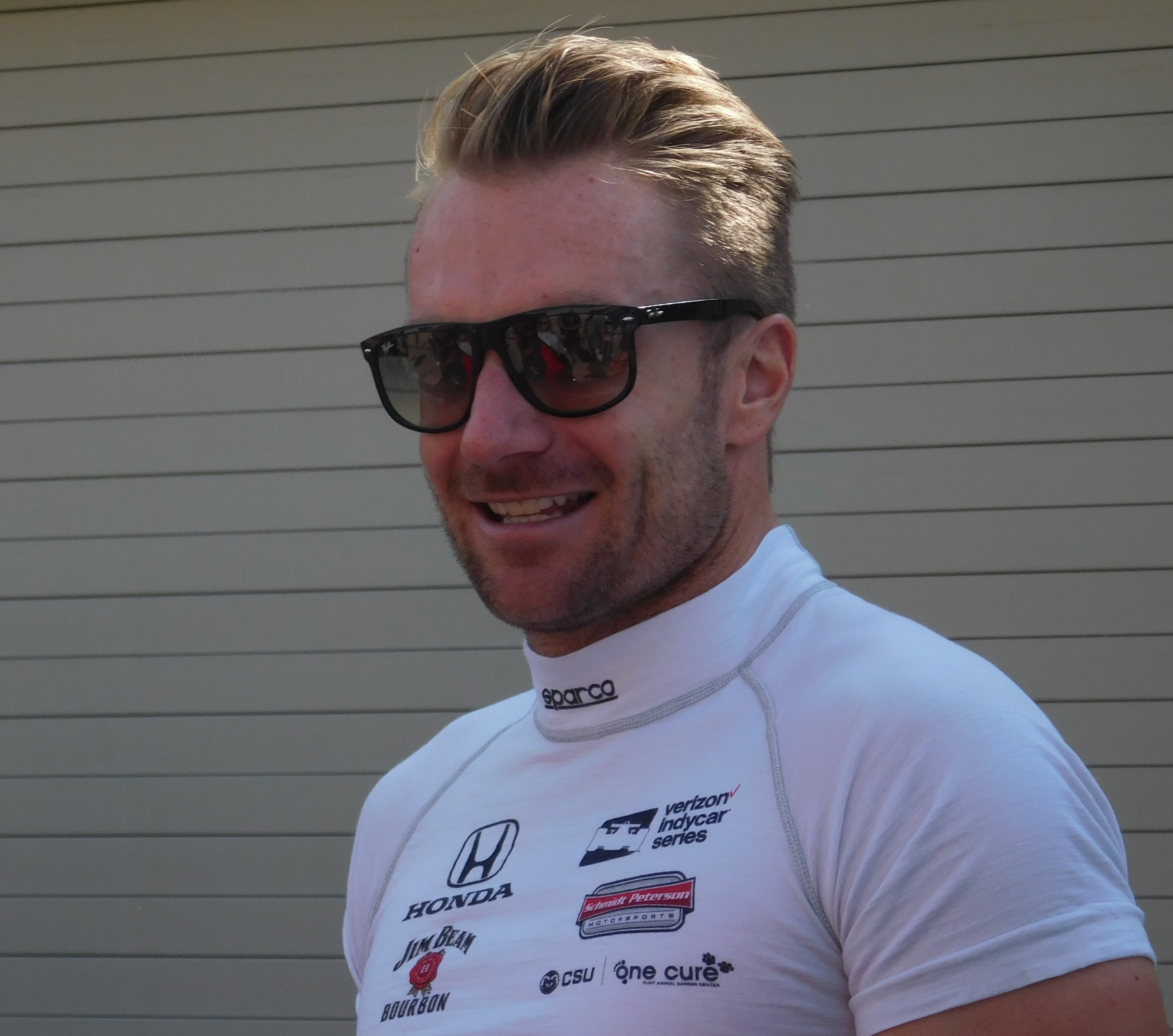
- Howard at Indianapolis Motor Speedway in 2017
- Nationality: (United Kingdom) British
- Born: 16 February 1981 (age 45) Basildon, Essex, United Kingdom

IRL IndyCar Series
- Categorisation: FIA Silver
- Years active: 2008, 2010–11
- Teams: Roth Racing; Sarah Fisher Racing; Rahal Letterman Lanigan Racing; Sam Schmidt Motorsports
- Starts: 14
- Wins: 0
- Poles: 0
- Best finish: 28th in 2008

Previous series
- 2006–2007, 2009 2006 2004–2005 2003 2003 2002: Firestone Indy Lights Toyota Racing Series; U.S. F2000 National Championship; Formula Renault 2000 UK Winter Championship; British Formula Ford Championship; Avon Tyres Junior Formula Ford

Championship titles
- 2006 2005 2003: Indy Pro Series; U.S. F2000 National Championship; Formula Renault 2000 UK Winter Championship

Jay Howard (born 16 February 1981 in Basildon, England) is a British professional race car driver who competed in the IndyCar Series and Indianapolis 500. He qualified for the Indianapolis 500 in 2011, 2017 and 2018.

== Career ==
=== Junior formula racing ===
Howard was the 2005 US Formula Ford Zetec champion. He competed in the 2006 Indy Pro Series for Sam Schmidt Motorsports, where he claimed the title in his rookie season over Jonathan Klein and Wade Cunningham, earning two victories (Nashville and Kentucky) and seven total podium finishes. He made three starts for SpeedWorks at the beginning of the 2007 Indy Pro Series season, but was inactive for the rest of the year.

=== IndyCar Series (2008) ===
Roth Racing announced on 26 November 2007 that they had signed Howard to drive their second car for the 2008 IndyCar Series season.

Howard was hired on merit/talent and did not bring sponsorship to the team. The team was presented with a sponsorship opportunity with another driver and Howard was replaced in the No. 24 Roth Racing entry by John Andretti for the 2008 Indianapolis 500. This was originally announced as a one–race arrangement, meaning Howard would be back for the Milwaukee race. However, on 30 May, it was announced that Andretti would continue in the No. 24 car in the Milwaukee Mile and Texas Motor Speedway races. Andretti also drove in the next two races at the Iowa Speedway and Richmond International Raceway, but Howard returned to the car for the Watkins Glen International road course race. It would be Howard's last race with the team, as it contracted to a single car driven by team owner Marty Roth for the rest of the season.

=== Firestone Indy Lights (2009) ===
Howard began the 2009 Indy Lights season – the new name for the Indy Pro Series – for the rookie outfit Team PBIR. He competed in five races, before being replaced by paying drivers Pablo Donoso and Richard Philippe for the remainder of the season.

=== Return to the IndyCar Series (2010–18) ===
==== 2010 season ====
While Howard was announced in late 2009 with SFR for four events – Indianapolis Motor Speedway, Texas Motor Speedway, Chicagoland Speedway, Mid-Ohio Sports Car Course – on 1 March 2010, SFR announced that they would add the Kansas Speedway event to Howard's campaign. On 14 April, Howard joined team owner Fisher when he was the first entrant for the 2010 Indianapolis 500, while celebrating the 100th anniversary of English drivers competing at the legendary Indianapolis Motor Speedway.

On 21 April, Howard unveiled the 2010 paint scheme for his No. 66 Service Central entry at Kansas Speedway during a private test. On 23 May, Howard had qualified for the 94th running of the Indianapolis 500. With just minutes left before the gun would fire to signal the 33-car field, Howard's entry was withdrawn due to pressure from next in queue, veteran driver Paul Tracy. Howard failed to show sufficient speed to qualify and missed the race. On 28 August, Howard competed in his last race with SFR, fulfilling his contract with the team.

On 10 October, Howard won the RoboPong 200 all-star kart race at the New Castle Motorsports Park along with teammate Bill McLaughlin Jr., beating such notable drivers as Will Power and Graham Rahal, among others.

==== 2011 season ====
Howard noted in an interview on 14 October 2010, on Trackside with Curt Cavin and Kevin Lee on 1070 The Fan Indianapolis, that he would in no way return to SFR after the year they had. He also noted that he has his 2011 Indianapolis 500 program solidified and the team would be announced soon. Howard signed a deal with Rahal Letterman Lanigan Racing in association with Sam Schmidt Motorsports to race in the 2011 Indianapolis 500 and the twin races at Texas Motor Speedway. Howard successfully qualified for the Indy 500 on pole day in the twentieth position. He crashed out of the race after completing sixty laps and was credited with thirtieth place. Two weeks later, he finished fifteenth and twentieth in the twin races at Texas Motor Speedway.

==== 2012 season ====
Howard was announced on 23 April 2012 as the driver of a Mike Shank Racing entry, which was filed for the 96th running of the Indianapolis 500. On 2 May 2012, MSR Indy announced they had relieved Howard of his duties to the team, after an engine deal had not materialised for the team, leaving the Brit open to pursue other options.

==== 2017 season ====
After a four-year absence from the Verizon IndyCar Series, Howard made his return to the series during the 101st running of the Indy 500 in a car financed by Tony Stewart and Sam Schmidt.

==== 2018 season ====
Howard returned to Sam Schmidt Motorsports and competed in the 2018 Indy 500 for the second consecutive time in the race and for the team.

== Motorsports Driver Development (MDD) ==
In 2012, Howard founded Jay Howard Driver Development in hopes of creating a unique program capable of taking drivers from karts to cars and then up the motorsports ladder.

=== Karts ===
In the karting field, Howard has used his experience from the British Karting Championship, Indy Lights, and IndyCar to coach drivers of all ages. Initially, Howard focused only on drivers that already competing at the national level of karting; more recently, however, he has begun working with drivers at a club level, primarily at NOLA Motorsports Park. In the short time of running MDD, Howard has already coached drivers to two national championships in 2016, when Braden Eves won the World Karting Championship in Italian American Motor Engineering X-30 Senior and Yamaha Senior. MDD also claims multiple wins in the SuperKarts! USA Pro Tour as well as several wins in the United States Pro Kart Series.

In January 2017, Howard began running the "MDD Sprint Kart Championship" series at NOLA Motorsports park.

=== Formula 4 (U.S.) ===
In 2017, Howard entered four cars into the second year of the Formula 4 United States Championship under the umbrella of MDD. Since the start of the season, the rookie team has found tremendous success. MDD obtained their highest finish during the second round of the championship, when rookie driver Braden Eves was able to obtain second at Indianapolis Motor Speedway after only one day in the car. Eves is set to race again in the final round of the championship at Circuit of the Americas in October.

Since the first round of the F4 United States Championship, Howard has had a total of eight drivers compete in the series. Currently, Howard is working on growing his F4 Program with the hopes of advancing some of his prominent kart racers to the F4 Championship in 2018.

== Media work ==
In a national promotion with MTV and American Family Insurance, Howard served as a driver coach for music-obsessed teen Lauren Goodell during the fall of 2009. Commercials were filmed on 12 and 13 October in Nebraska at Mid-America Motorplex. The commercials were first aired during MTV's Real World/Road Rules Challenge on 28 October 2009, and ran for four weeks during MTV's flagship program. A fifth installment was scheduled for 4 December 2009 during the mtvU Woodie Awards, which were filmed on 18 October in New York City.

Howard is represented by BRANDed Management agency, founded by Klint Briney.

== Personal life ==
Howard married his longtime girlfriend Courtney Nicoson on Saturday, 29 October 2011 in a private ceremony in Indianapolis, Indiana. Jay & Courtney live in Carmel, Ind., with their only child, a son, Hudson. Howard was the subject of the cover story for the Carmel Monthly magazazine's May 2021 issue.

== Motorsports career results ==
=== American open-wheel racing results ===
(key) (Races in bold indicate pole position)

==== Indy Lights ====
| Year | Team | 1 | 2 | 3 | 4 | 5 | 6 | 7 | 8 | 9 | 10 | 11 | 12 | 13 | 14 | 15 | 16 | Rank | Points | Ref |
|---|---|---|---|---|---|---|---|---|---|---|---|---|---|---|---|---|---|---|---|---|
| 2006 | Sam Schmidt Motorsports | **HMS**; 3 | STP; 3 | STP; 2 | INDY; 2 | WGL; 6 | IMS; 18 | NSH; 1 | MIL; 7 | KTY; 1 | SNM; 10 | SNM; 5 | **CHI**; 3 | | | | | **1st** | **390** | |
| 2007 | SpeedWorks | HMS; 10 | STP; 5 | STP; 24 | INDY | MIL | IMS | IMS | IOW | WGL | WGL | NSH | MOH | KTY | SNM | SNM | CHI | **28th** | **56** | |
| 2009 | Team PBIR | STP; 5 | STP; 8 | LBH; 13 | KAN; 10 | INDY; 4 | MIL | IOW | WGL | TOR | EDM | KTY | MOH | SNM | CHI | HMS | | **21st** | **123** | |

==== IndyCar Series ====
| Year | Team | No. | Chassis | Engine | 1 | 2 | 3 | 4 | 5 | 6 | 7 | 8 | 9 | 10 | 11 | 12 | 13 | 14 | 15 | 16 | 17 | 18 | 19 | Rank | Points | Ref |
|---|---|---|---|---|---|---|---|---|---|---|---|---|---|---|---|---|---|---|---|---|---|---|---|---|---|---|
| 2008 | Roth Racing | 24 | Dallara IR-05 | Honda | HMS; 22 | STP; 14 | MOT^{1} 13 | LBH^{1} | KAN; 13 | INDY | MIL | TXS | IOW | RIR | WGL; 26 | NSH | MOH | EDM | KTY | SNM | DET | CHI | SRF^{2} | 28th | 72 | |
| 2010 | Sarah Fisher Racing | 66 | Dallara IR-05 | Honda | SAO | STP | ALA | LBH | KAN; 25 | INDY; DNQ | TXS; 26 | IOW | WGL | TOR | EDM | MOH; 24 | SNM | CHI; 22 | KTY | MOT | HMS | | | 31st | 44 | |
| 2011 | Sam Schmidt Motorsports | 88 | Dallara IR-05 | Honda | STP | ALA | LBH | SAO | INDY; 30 | TXS; 15 | TXS; 20 | MIL | IOW | TOR | EDM | MOH | NHA | SNM | BAL | MOT | KTY | | | 40th | 27 | |
| 2011 | Rahal Letterman Lanigan Racing | 15 | Dallara IR-05 | Honda | | | | | | | | | | | | | | | | | | LVS; C^{3} | | 40th | 27 | |
| 2017 | Schmidt Peterson Motorsports | 77 | Dallara DW12 | Honda | STP | LBH | ALA | PHX | IMS | INDY; 33 | DET | DET | TXS | ROA | IOW | TOR | MOH | POC | GTW | WGL | SNM | | | 32nd | 24 | |
| 2018 | Schmidt Peterson Motorsports AFS Racing | 7 | Dallara DW12 | Honda | STP | PHX | LBH | ALA | IMS | INDY; 24 | DET | DET | TXS | RDA | IOW | TOR | MOH | POC | GTW | POR | SNM | | | 39th | 12 | |

* Season still in progress.

^{1} Run on same day.
^{2} Non-points-paying, exhibition race.
^{3} Race cancelled due to death of Dan Wheldon.

| Years | Teams | Races | Poles | Wins | Podiums (Non-win) | Top 10s (Non-podium) | Indianapolis 500 Wins | Championships |
|---|---|---|---|---|---|---|---|---|
| 4 | 3 | 13 | 0 | 0 | 0 | 0 | 0 | 0 |

==== Indianapolis 500 ====
| Year | Chassis | Engine | Start | Finish | Team | Note |
|---|---|---|---|---|---|---|
| 2008 | Dallara | Honda | Rpl | | Roth Racing | Passed rookie test but was then replaced by team with John Andretti |
| 2010 | Dallara | Honda | DNQ | | Sarah Fisher Racing | Qualifying time withdrawn and unable to re-qualify successfully. |
| 2011 | Dallara | Honda | 20 | 30 | RLL Racing/Sam Schmidt Motorsports | Was running seventh, but finished 30th in part because of a right-rear tire issue as he left pit lane. |
| 2012 | Dallara | N/A | DNA | | Mike Shank | Team was unable to secure an engine lease despite having full sponsorship to run Howard. |
| 2017 | Dallara | Honda | 20 | 33 | Schmidt Peterson Motorsports | Was running in 33rd position 7 laps down when crashed in Turn 1 involving Scott Dixon |
| 2018 | Dallara | Honda | 28 | 24 | SPM / AFS Racing | |

Sporting positions
| Preceded by Wade Cunningham | Indy Pro Series; Champion; 2006 | Succeeded by Alex Lloyd |
