= Veronica McCann =

- Nationality: (Australia) Australian
- Born: 24 August 1983 (age 43) New South Wales

Firestone Indy Lights Series
- Years active: 2006
- Teams: Brian Stewart Racing
- Starts: 1
- Wins: 0
- Poles: 0
- Best finish: 13 in 2006

Veronica McCann (born 24 August 1983) is a speedway race driver. After starting racing in Honda Odyssey's in 1992, she proceeded to Junior Sedans in 1996 in New South Wales and the Australian Capital Territory. When her family moved to Perth, Western Australia she continued in speedway in junior sedans until 2001 when she graduated into Sprintcars. After success in that class she was spotted by former Indycar driver Lyn St James and awarded a scholarship to IRL Indy Pro Series with Brian Stewart Racing in 2006. In 2008, she moved to Dirt Late Model in an effort to get back to America with limited success.

== Career results ==
Season	Series	Position
1992	New South Wales Honda Odyssey Australian Sub Junior Titles	3rd
1992	Australian Honda Odyssey State Sub Driver Junior Championship	3rd
1992	Australian Capital Territory Honda Odyssey Junior Championship	3rd
1993	Australian Capital Territory Honda Odyssey Junior Championship	2nd
1996	RDA Junior Club Championship	4th
1997	RDA Junior Club Championship	5th
1998	Western Australian Junior Sedan Titles	1st
1998	RDA Junior Club Championship	1st
2000	Western Australian Junior Sedan Titles	1st
2002	World Series Sprintcar	37th
2002–03	Kwinana Motorplex Sprintcar Championship	1st
2002–03	Western Australian Sprintcar Titles	3rd
2003–04	Kwinana Motorplex Sprintcar Championship	2nd
2003–04	Western Australian Sprintcar Titles	3rd
2004–05	Kwinana Motorplex Sprintcar Championship	2nd
2004–05	Western Australian Sprintcar Titles	3rd
2006	IRL Indy Pro Series	11th
2007/2008	Kart World Belmont Pro Dirt Series	9th
2007/2008	Perth Motorplex Late Model Track Championship	7th
2016	Pro Dirt Late Model Series	19th
2017	Pro Dirt Late Model Series	7th
2017	USA Late Model Invasion Tour	15th
2017	Australian Late Model Championship	11th
2018	Pro Dirt Late Model Series	5th
2018	USA Late Model Invasion Tour	27th
2019	Pro Dirt Late Model Series	10th
2019	USA Late Model Invasion Tour	27th
2020	Pro Dirt Late Model Series	4th
2020	USA Late Model Invasion Tour	11th
2020	Australian Late Model Championship	10th
2021	Pro Dirt Late Model Series	5th
2022	Pro Dirt Late Model Series	4th
2022	Wild West Showdown	7th
2023	Pro Dirt Late Model Series	8th
2023	Wild West Showdown	17th
2023	Australian Late Model Championship	19th
2024	Australian Late Model Championship	18th
2025	Australian Late Model Championship	11th

=== Indy Lights ===
Year	Team	1	2	3	4	5	6	7	8	9	10	11	12	Rank	Points	Ref
2006	Brian Stewart Racing	HMS	STP1	STP2	INDY	WGL	IMS	NSH	MIL	KTY	SNM1	SNM2	CHI; 11	37th	19	

== Television ==
In 2005, Veronica appeared on season one of Australian Princess which aired on Network Ten.

== Personal life ==
Veronica resides in Leederville, Western Australia.
