= Alex Lloyd (racing driver) =

British racing driver (born 1984)

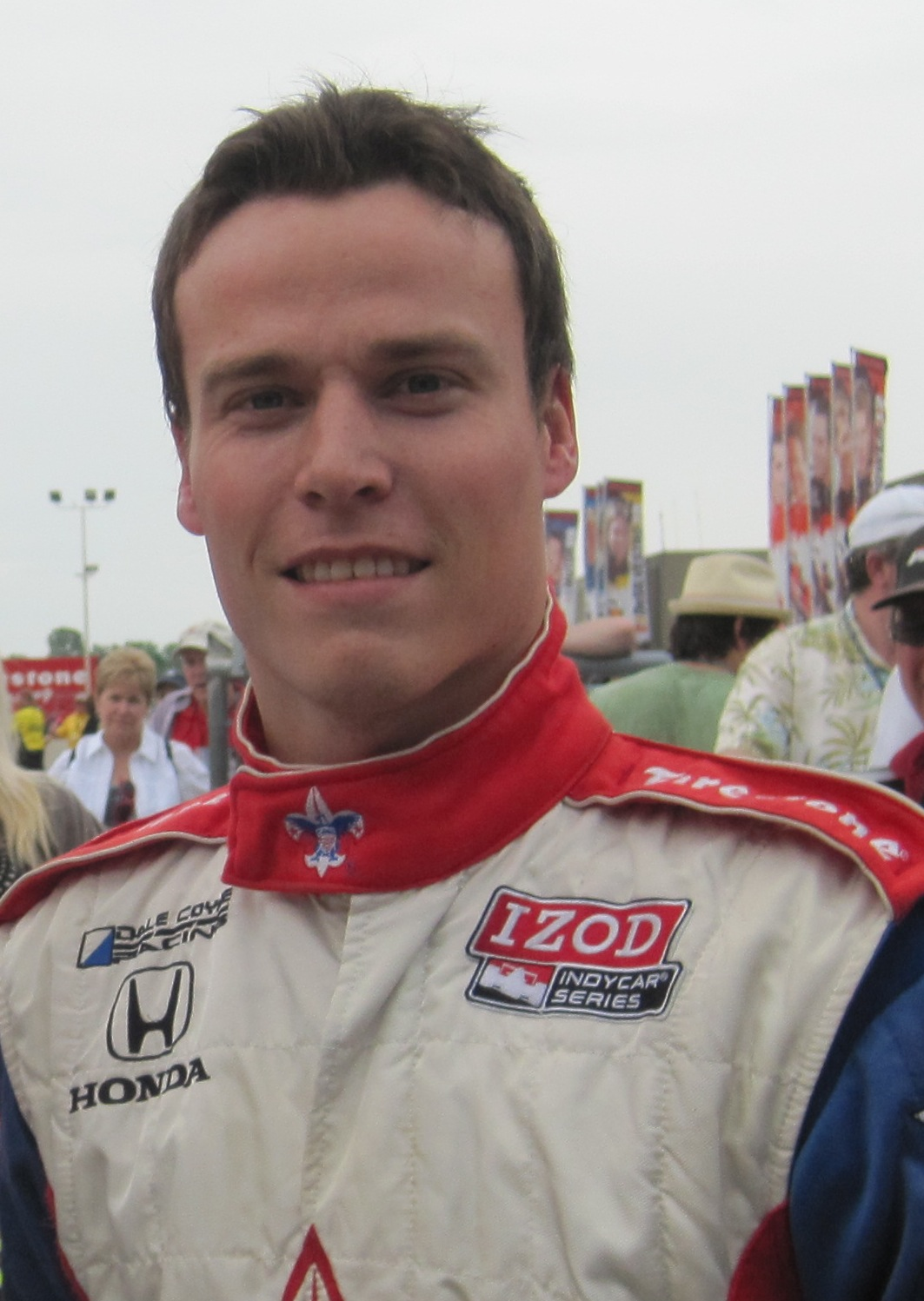
- Lloyd at the Indianapolis Motor Speedway in May 2010
- Nationality: (United Kingdom) British
- Born: Alex Stewart Lloyd; 28 December 1984 (age 41) Manchester, England, U.K.

IndyCar Series career
- Debut season: 2008
- Current team: None
- Categorisation: FIA Gold
- Years active: 4
- Car number: 16,19,99,40202
- Former teams: Newman/Haas/Lanigan Racing; Sam Schmidt Motorsports; Rahal Letterman Racing; Dale Coyne Racing
- Starts: 27
- Wins: 0
- Poles: 0
- Best finish: 16th in 2010

Previous series
- 2006–2007 2004 2002–2003: Indy Pro Series; Euro Formula 3000; Formula Renault 2.0 UK

Championship titles
- 2007: Indy Pro Series

Awards
- 2010 2003: IndyCar Series Rookie of the Year; McLaren Autosport Award

Alex Stewart Lloyd (born 28 December 1984) is a British former motor racing driver. Lloyd was the 2003 British Racing Driver of the Year and went on to win the 2007 Indy Lights Championship and finished fourth in the 2010 Indianapolis 500. He was known by the nickname "Pink Lloyd." Lloyd now produces music under the alias "Mr Lloyd."

== Junior racing career ==
Lloyd was born in Manchester, England. At the age of nine, he began kart racing in the British Super One Championship and the European championship. In 1999, at the age of fourteen, he became the British Open Champion in kart racing. In 2000, he began testing Formula Ford cars.

In 2001, Lloyd moved into Formula Ford racing, placing second at a European Championship round at Spa-Francorchamps. He also finished in thirteenth place in the prestigious Formula Ford Festival. During the winter, he raced in the Formula Renault UK Winter Series, placing third in the championship. He graduated to the main Formula Renault series in 2002, finishing ninth in the championship.

During 2003, Lloyd earned the BRCD McLaren Autosport Young Driver of the Year award. This followed a second place finish in the Formula Renault UK championship behind Lewis Hamilton and ahead of James Rossiter and Mike Conway.

== Formula One and IndyCar ==
In 2004, Lloyd conducted his first Formula One test in a McLaren as part of his prize for winning the Young Driver of the Year award the previous year. He was unable to compete in British Formula 3 as planned, due to funding problems. However, he carried out several tests with Alan Docking Racing and teammate Will Power. He took part in the final seven rounds of the Euro Formula 3000 series, recording one win and three pole positions.

Lloyd continued to struggle to find financial backing in 2005, only taking in two races in Italian Formula 3000 for the in order to help with car development and a one-off ride in a Formula Renault 3.5 Series event at Monaco. For the winter of 2005–06 he was signed up to drive in A1 Grand Prix for Team Great Britain, however he only undertook one mid-season drive and was never able to race the car, with the GB team opting to give veteran driver Robbie Kerr greater opportunities.

=== Move to the United States ===
For the 2006 season, Lloyd signed with AFS Racing partway through the year to race the remainder of the whole season in the Indy Pro Series. As a last attempt at providing finance for Lloyd's career, his parents sold their house in Port Soderick in the Isle of Man. Lloyd subsequently qualified second for his first race with the team at St. Petersburg and finished his second race that weekend in third place. In July, he won the road course race at Indianapolis Motor Speedway the day before the United States Grand Prix, the first race ever won by AFS Racing. Later in the season he won the Valley of the Moon 100 for AFS Racing, held at Infineon Raceway, and went on to finish seventh in the final standings.

For the 2007 IPS season, Lloyd drove for Sam Schmidt Motorsports and promptly won the first five races of the season. He clinched the series championship with his eighth win of the season at Infineon Raceway with two races remaining in the season. During the season he shattered all league records for consecutive wins (five), wins in a season (eight), career wins (ten) and most points scored (652). He became the first person to have won on both the road course at Indianapolis Motor Speedway and also the famous two and a half-mile oval itself, until Will Power did the same in the Indycar series in 2018.

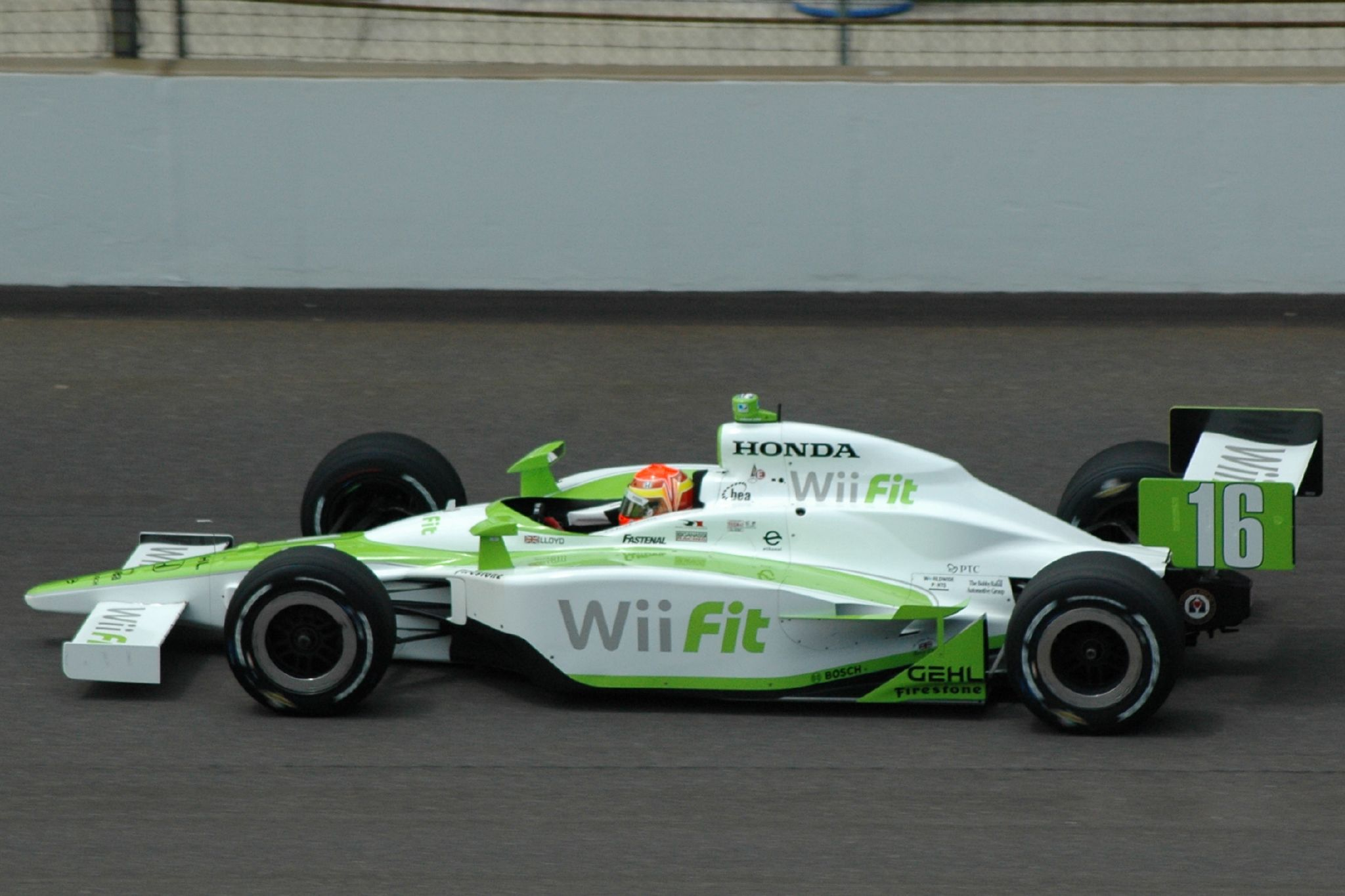
Lloyd practicing for the 2008 Indy 500

On the basis of this dominating performance, and following an IndyCar test, on 17 October 2007, Lloyd was signed as a driver in Chip Ganassi Racing's driver development program. Unable to raise sufficient funds for a full drive with the team in 2008, he participated in a limited schedule including the IndyCar Series and Grand-Am Rolex Sports Car Series Daytona Prototype races and limited IndyCar testing.

On 10 April 2008, it was announced that Chip Ganassi Racing and Rahal Letterman Racing would work together to field an entry for Lloyd, for the 2008 Indianapolis 500 on 25 May 2008. Lloyd was fastest in the rookie tests, but only qualified in nineteenth place, after having been briefly hospitalized following a heavy accident at 223 mph (359 km/h). Towards the end of the race he crashed heavily, sliding down the pit road and across several teams' pit bays, all of which were empty.

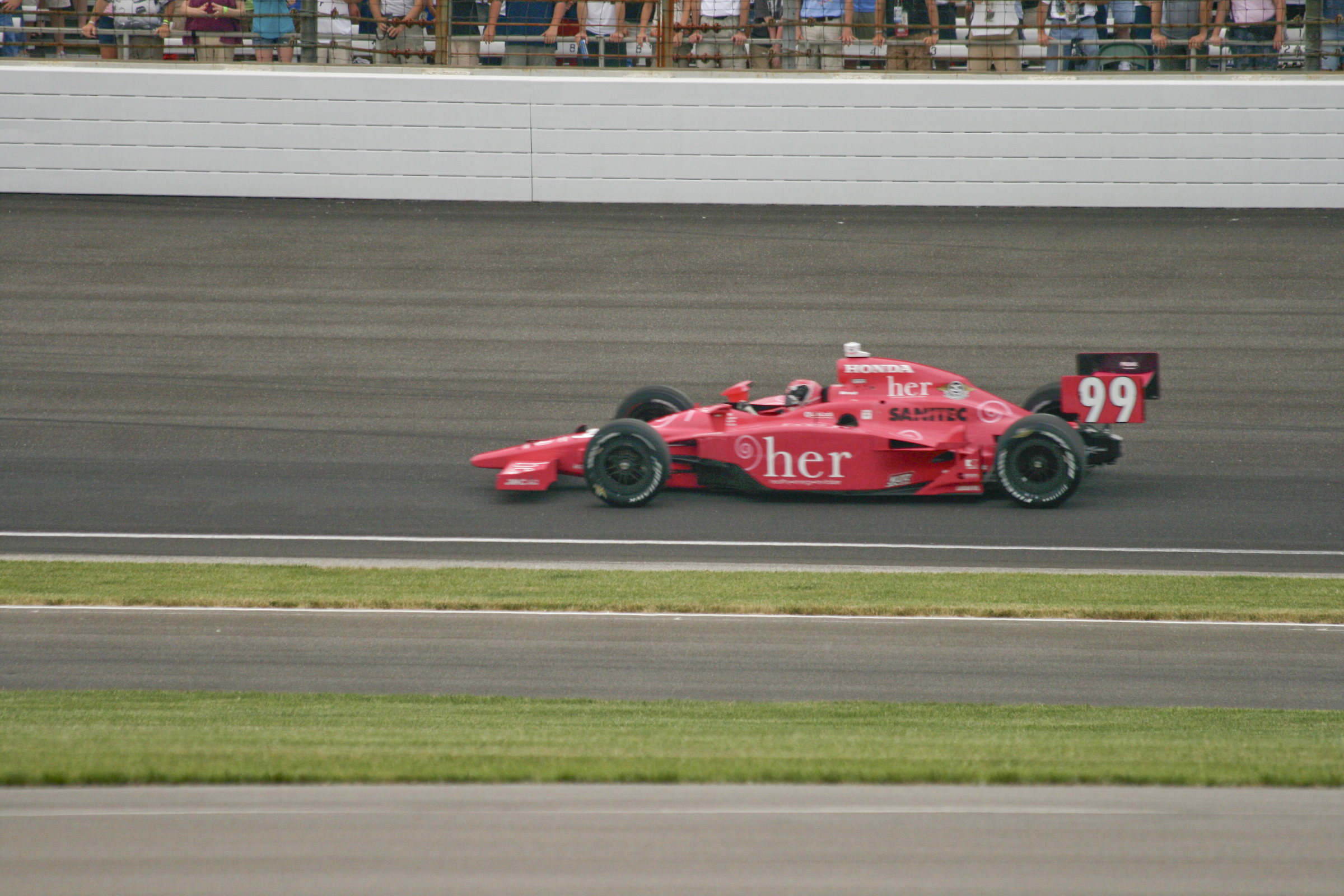
Lloyd driving in the 2009 Indy 500

Still without the finance for a full-time drive, Lloyd returned to the 2009 Indianapolis 500, racing for Sam Schmidt Motorsports in partnership with Ganassi. Lloyd was sponsored by HER Energy Drink and wore a hot pink firesuit for the entire month to match his car's distinctive colour scheme. This led to Lloyd being given the nickname "Pink Lloyd", after the band Pink Floyd, one of his favorite bands. With five minutes remaining on Pole Day, Lloyd was able to qualify the car in the eleventh position to qualify for his second 500. Lloyd finished 13th after losing a lap early in the race when the car's rear signal light was seen to be broken and Lloyd's car had to pit for the offending light to be replaced.

In 2010, Lloyd teamed with Dale Coyne Racing to drive the No. 19 car sponsored by the Boy Scouts of America. He finished fourth for the team in the 2010 Indianapolis 500, his best performance to date in an IndyCar race. Lloyd would also win the Firestone tire-ific Move of the Race for his performance at Texas, and finished the year as the best of all rookies, thereby winning the Rookie of the Year award.

Still without funding, Lloyd started 2011 without a full-time drive. However, leading up to the 2011 Indianapolis 500 he was signed again by Dale Coyne's race team, to run not only the 500 but all oval races on the 2011 IndyCar Series schedule, as a counterpart to Sebastian Bourdais (who contested all of the road & street courses).

In 2014, Lloyd competed in three races in the Pirelli World Challenge GT class, driving a 2006 Corvette Z06 for CRP Racing. He also won a one-off rally in the B-Spec class at Rally America's Lake Superior Performance Rally (LSPR). On 7 December, Lloyd was victorious in the 2014 25 Hours of Thunderhill endurance race with Davidson Racing, sharing the wheel with Randy Pobst, Kyle Marcelli and Brian Frisselle. The four drove a BMW-powered Norma, becoming the first team in history to win the event in a machine from the "sports racer" ESR class.

== Other ventures ==
Since 2012, Lloyd has reviewed production cars for outlets including Jalopnik, Automobile Magazine, Road & Track and Yahoo Autos. He was employed by Yahoo! as the Editor-at-Large of Yahoo Autos. Lloyd now produces dance music under the alia "Mr Lloyd," and has released numerous popular records.

== Personal life ==
Lloyd is married to two-time Olympian Mariya Koroleva. Koroleva competed in synchronized swimming (now known as artistic swimming) at both the 2012 games in London and the 2016 games in Rio. Lloyd also has four children. His second oldest, Bethany, was due to be born on 24 May 2009, the same day Lloyd was scheduled to race in the Indianapolis 500, generating significant media attention.

== Motorsports career results ==
=== American open–wheel racing results ===
(key) (Races in bold indicate pole position)

==== Indy Lights ====
Year	Team	1	2	3	4	5	6	7	8	9	10	11	12	13	14	15	16	Rank	Points	Ref
2006	AFS Racing	HMS	STP1; 10	STP2; 3	INDY; 5	WGL; 17	IMS; 1	NSH; DNS	MIL	KTY; 16	SNM1; 2	SNM2; 1	CHI; 4					**7th**	**294**	
2007	Sam Schmidt Motorsports	HMS; 1	**STP1**; 1	STP2; 1	INDY; 1	**MIL**; 1	IMS1; 2	IMS2; 2	IOW; 1	WGL1; 3	WGL2; 1	**NSH**; 11	**MOH**; 22	KTY; 2	SNM1; 1	SNM2; DNS	**CHI**; 2	**1st**	**652**	

==== IndyCar ====
Year	Team	No.	Chassis	Engine	1	2	3	4	5	6	7	8	9	10	11	12	13	14	15	16	17	18	19	Rank	Points	Ref
2008	Rahal Letterman Racing Chip Ganassi Racing	16	Dallara IR-05	Honda HI7R V8	HMS	STP	MOT^{1}	LBH^{1}	KAN	INDY; 25	MIL	TXS	IOW	RIR	WGL	NSH	MOH	EDM	KTY	SNM	DET	CHI	SRF^{2}	38th	10	
2009	Sam Schmidt Motorsports Chip Ganassi Racing	99	Dallara IR-05	Honda HI7R V8	STP	LBH	KAN	INDY; 13	MIL	TXS	IOW	RIR	WGL	TOR	EDM	KTY	MOH	SNM	CHI	MOT				30th	41	
2009	Newman/Haas/Lanigan Racing	40202	Dallara IR-05	Honda HI7R V8																	HMS; 8			30th	41	
2010	Dale Coyne Racing	19	Dallara IR-05	Honda HI7R V8	SAO; 18	STP; 23	ALA; 23	LBH; 19	KAN; 19	INDY; 4	TXS; 8	IOW; 13	WGL; 25	TOR; 23	EDM; 18	MOH; 13	SNM; 10	CHI; 21	KTY; 13	MOT; 21	HMS; 12			16th	266	
2011	Dale Coyne Racing	19	Dallara IR-05	Honda HI7R V8	STP	ALA	LBH	SAO	INDY; 19	TXS1; 14	TXS2; 24	MIL; 22	IOW; 13	TOR	EDM	MOH	NHM; 13	SNM	BAL	MOT	KTY; 26	LVS^{3} C		27th	85	

^{1} Run on same day.
^{2} Non-points race.
^{3} The Las Vegas Indy 300 was abandoned after Dan Wheldon died from injuries sustained in a 15-car crash on lap 11.

Years	Teams	Races	Poles	Wins	Podiums (Non-win)	Top 10s (Non-podium)	Indianapolis 500 Wins	Championships
4	4	27	0	0	0	4	0	0

==== Indianapolis 500 ====
Year	Chassis	Engine	Start	Finish	Team	Note
2008	Dallara	Honda	19	25	Rahal Letterman Racing	Retired (contact)
2009	Dallara	Honda	11	13	Sam Schmidt Motorsports	Completed every lap
2010	Dallara	Honda	26	4	Dale Coyne Racing	Completed every lap
2011	Dallara	Honda	30	19	Dale Coyne Racing	198 laps completed

Pirelli World Challenge

Year	Team	1	2	3	4	5	6	7	8	9	10	11	12	13	14	15	16
2014	CRP Racing	STP	LBH	BAR 1	BAR 2	DET 1	DET 2	ROA 1	ROA 2	TOR 1	TOR 2	MOH 1; 11	MOH 2; 22	SNM 1 DNS	SNM 2; 17	UTA 1; 14	UTA 2; 22

Sporting positions
Preceded by Jay Howard	Indy Pro Series Champion; 2007	Succeeded by Raphael Matos
Preceded by Raphael Matos	IndyCar Series Rookie of the Year; 2010	Succeeded by James Hinchcliffe
Awards
Preceded by Jamie Green	McLaren Autosport BRDC Award; 2003	Succeeded by Paul di Resta
