= 2011 Firestone Twin 275s =

The Firestone Twin 275s were the sixth and seventh races of the 2011 IZOD IndyCar Series season. The races took place on June 11, on the 1.455-mile (2.342 km)Texas Motor Speedway in Fort Worth, Texas, and was telecasted by Versus in the United States.

The race was unique in its format of two 114-lap races, with each race was for half points. The second race grid positions were determined by a random draw.

These would ultimately be the last two races of Davey Hamilton's career. Hamilton would be entered into the 2011 IZOD IndyCar World Championship at Las Vegas, however the race would be red flagged due to a huge crash that claimed the life of two time champion Dan Wheldon. The race would not be restarted and as the race had not gone enough distance to be called official, no results were recorded, making these the final two races of Davey Hamilton's career.

Race two would mark the last time for 66 races that every car finished a race. The next time this would happen would be the 2015 Toyota Grand Prix of Long Beach.

== Classification ==
=== Qualifying ===
Pos	No.	Driver	Team	Lap 1	Lap 2	Total
1	77	(Canada) Alex Tagliani	Sam Schmidt Motorsports	24.3530	24.3304	48.6834
2	10	(United Kingdom) Dario Franchitti	Chip Ganassi Racing	24.3941	24.3767	48.7708
3	12	(Australia) Will Power	Team Penske	24.3788	24.4113	48.7901
4	5	(Japan) Takuma Sato	KV Racing Technology - Lotus	24.4196	24.4265	48.8461
5	67	(United States) Ed Carpenter	Chip Ganassi Racing	24.4565	24.4116	48.8681
6	82	(Brazil) Tony Kanaan	KV Racing Technology - Lotus	24.4203	24.4754	48.8957
7	9	(New Zealand) Scott Dixon	Chip Ganassi Racing	24.4852	24.4632	48.9484
8	99	(New Zealand) Wade Cunningham (R)	Sam Schmidt Motorsports	24.4686	24.4818	48.9504
9	6	(Australia) Ryan Briscoe	Team Penske	24.4829	24.4953	48.9782
10	7	(United States) Danica Patrick	Andretti Autosport	24.5077	24.4800	48.9877
11	4	(United States) J. R. Hildebrand (R)	Panther Racing	24.5249	24.5527	49.0776
12	14	(Brazil) Vítor Meira	A. J. Foyt Enterprises	24.5183	24.5660	49.0843
13	3	(Brazil) Hélio Castroneves	Team Penske	24.5566	24.5730	49.1296
14	2	(Spain) Oriol Servià	Newman/Haas Racing	24.6079	24.5698	49.1777
15	06	(Canada) James Hinchcliffe (R)	Newman/Haas Racing	24.5673	24.6228	49.1901
16	28	(United States) Ryan Hunter-Reay	Andretti Autosport	24.5964	24.6010	49.1074
17	83	(United States) Charlie Kimball (R)	Chip Ganassi Racing	24.6140	24.6161	49.2301
18	11	(United States) Davey Hamilton	Dreyer & Reinbold Racing	24.6273	24.6587	49.2860
19	59	(Venezuela) E. J. Viso	KV Racing Technology - Lotus	24.6509	24.6493	49.3002
20	38	(United States) Graham Rahal	Chip Ganassi Racing	24.6595	24.6616	49.3211
21	8	(Canada) Paul Tracy	Dragon Racing	24.6621	24.6820	49.3441
22	27	(United Kingdom) Mike Conway	Andretti Autosport	24.6814	24.6732	49.3546
23	26	(United States) Marco Andretti	Andretti Autosport	24.7036	24.6595	49.3631
24	24	(Brazil) Ana Beatriz	Dreyer & Reinbold Racing	24.6955	24.6682	49.3637
25	19	(United Kingdom) Alex Lloyd	Dale Coyne Racing	24.7081	24.6859	49.3940
26	34	(Colombia) Sebastián Saavedra (R)	Conquest Racing	24.6980	24.7185	49.4075
27	22	(United Kingdom) Justin Wilson	Dreyer & Reinbold Racing	24.7514	24.7193	49.4707
28	88	(United Kingdom) Jay Howard (R)	Sam Schmidt Motorsports	24.7380	24.7492	49.4872
29	78	(Switzerland) Simona de Silvestro	HVM Racing	24.8638	24.8197	49.6835
30	18	(United Kingdom) James Jakes (R)	Dale Coyne Racing	No Time		

=== Race One ===
Pos	No.	Driver	Team	Laps	Time/Retired	Grid	Laps Led	Points
1	10	(United Kingdom) Dario Franchitti	Chip Ganassi Racing	114	54:47.2787	2	110	27
2	9	(New Zealand) Scott Dixon	Chip Ganassi Racing	114	+ 0.0527	7	1	20
3	12	(Australia) Will Power	Team Penske	114	+ 0.2064	3	0	18
4	77	(Canada) Alex Tagliani	Sam Schmidt Motorsports	114	+ 0.4109	1	1	17
5	5	(Japan) Takuma Sato	KV Racing Technology - Lotus	114	+ 1.4174	4	0	15
6	6	(Australia) Ryan Briscoe	Team Penske	114	+ 1.4337	9	0	14
7	59	(Venezuela) E. J. Viso	KV Racing Technology - Lotus	114	+ 2.1127	19	0	13
8	14	(Brazil) Vítor Meira	A. J. Foyt Enterprises	114	+ 2.5355	12	1	12
9	38	(United States) Graham Rahal	Chip Ganassi Racing	114	+ 2.8146	20	0	11
10	3	(Brazil) Hélio Castroneves	Team Penske	114	+ 4.3388	13	1	10
11	82	(Brazil) Tony Kanaan	KV Racing Technology - Lotus	114	+ 4.7842	6	0	9
12	8	(Canada) Paul Tracy	Dragon Racing	114	+ 7.0114	21	0	9
13	26	(United States) Marco Andretti	Andretti Autosport	113	+ 1 Lap	23	0	8
14	19	(United Kingdom) Alex Lloyd	Dale Coyne Racing	113	+ 1 Lap	25	0	8
15	88	(United Kingdom) Jay Howard (R)	Sam Schmidt Motorsports	113	+ 1 Lap	28	0	7
16	7	(United States) Danica Patrick	Andretti Autosport	113	+ 1 Lap	10	0	7
17	22	(United Kingdom) Justin Wilson	Dreyer & Reinbold Racing	113	+ 1 Lap	27	0	6
18	67	(United States) Ed Carpenter	Chip Ganassi Racing	113	+ 1 Lap	5	0	6
19	28	(United States) Ryan Hunter-Reay	Andretti Autosport	113	+ 1 Lap	16	0	6
20	06	(Canada) James Hinchcliffe (R)	Newman/Haas Racing	113	+ 1 Lap	15	0	6
21	2	(Spain) Oriol Servià	Newman/Haas Racing	112	+ 2 Laps	14	0	6
22	24	(Brazil) Ana Beatriz	Dreyer & Reinbold Racing	112	+ 2 Laps	24	0	6
23	4	(United States) J. R. Hildebrand (R)	Panther Racing	112	+ 2 Laps	11	0	6
24	27	(United Kingdom) Mike Conway	Andretti Autosport	112	+ 2 Laps	22	0	6
25	18	(United Kingdom) James Jakes (R)	Dale Coyne Racing	112	+ 2 Laps	30	0	5
26	78	(Switzerland) Simona de Silvestro	HVM Racing	111	+ 3 Laps	29	0	5
27	11	(United States) Davey Hamilton	Dreyer & Reinbold Racing	109	+ 5 Laps	18	0	5
28	34	(Colombia) Sebastián Saavedra (R)	Conquest Racing	97	+ 17 Laps	26	0	5
29	99	(New Zealand) Wade Cunningham (R)	Sam Schmidt Motorsports	92	Contact	8	0	5
30	83	(United States) Charlie Kimball (R)	Chip Ganassi Racing	91	Contact	17	0	5
OFFICIAL RACE REPORT

=== Race Two ===
Pos	No.	Driver	Team	Laps	Time/Retired	Grid	Laps Led	Points
1	12	(Australia) Will Power	Team Penske	114	48:08.9739	3	68	27
2	9	(New Zealand) Scott Dixon	Chip Ganassi Racing	114	+ 0.9466	18	1	20
3	6	(Australia) Ryan Briscoe	Team Penske	114	+ 4.6524	12	3	18
4	3	(Brazil) Hélio Castroneves	Team Penske	114	+ 9.5738	6	1	16
5	82	(Brazil) Tony Kanaan	KV Racing Technology - Lotus	114	+ 14.3723	1	39	15
6	26	(United States) Marco Andretti	Andretti Autosport	114	+ 16.9488	27	0	14
7	10	(United Kingdom) Dario Franchitti	Chip Ganassi Racing	114	+ 18.4374	28	0	13
8	7	(United States) Danica Patrick	Andretti Autosport	114	+ 18.5558	20	0	12
9	28	(United States) Ryan Hunter-Reay	Andretti Autosport	114	+ 21.7976	5	0	11
10	59	(Venezuela) E. J. Viso	KV Racing Technology - Lotus	114	+ 24.0923	29	2	10
11	14	(Brazil) Vítor Meira	A. J. Foyt Enterprises	114	+ 24.6397	7	0	9
12	5	(Japan) Takuma Sato	KV Racing Technology - Lotus	113	+ 1 Lap	25	0	9
13	8	(Canada) Paul Tracy	Dragon Racing	113	+ 1 Lap	14	0	8
14	77	(Canada) Alex Tagliani	Sam Schmidt Motorsports	113	+ 1 Lap	16	0	8
15	2	(Spain) Oriol Servià	Newman/Haas Racing	113	+ 1 Lap	17	0	7
16	67	(United States) Ed Carpenter	Chip Ganassi Racing	113	+ 1 Lap	10	0	7
17	27	(United Kingdom) Mike Conway	Dreyer & Reinbold Racing	113	+ 1 Lap	26	0	6
18	4	(United States) J. R. Hildebrand (R)	Panther Racing	113	+ 1 Lap	21	0	6
19	06	(Canada) James Hinchcliffe (R)	Newman/Haas Racing	113	+ 1 Lap	9	0	6
20	88	(United Kingdom) Jay Howard (R)	Sam Schmidt Motorsports	113	+ 1 Lap	13	0	6
21	22	(United Kingdom) Justin Wilson	Dreyer & Reinbold Racing	113	+ 1 Lap	30	0	6
22	24	(Brazil) Ana Beatriz	Dreyer & Reinbold Racing	113	+ 1 Lap	15	0	6
23	83	(United States) Charlie Kimball (R)	Chip Ganassi Racing	112	+ 2 Laps	8	0	6
24	19	(United Kingdom) Alex Lloyd	Dale Coyne Racing	112	+ 2 Laps	19	0	6
25	11	(United States) Davey Hamilton	Dreyer & Reinbold Racing	112	+ 2 Laps	24	0	5
26	98	(New Zealand) Wade Cunningham (R)	Sam Schmidt Motorsports	112	+ 2 Laps	2	0	5
27	78	(Switzerland) Simona de Silvestro	HVM Racing	111	+ 3 Laps	22	0	5
28	18	(United Kingdom) James Jakes (R)	Dale Coyne Racing	111	+ 3 Laps	23	0	5
29	34	(Colombia) Sebastián Saavedra (R)	Conquest Racing	111	+ 3 Laps	11	0	5
30	38	(United States) Graham Rahal	Chip Ganassi Racing	104	+ 10 Laps	4	0	5
OFFICIAL RACE REPORT

== Championship standings after the race ==
Drivers' Championship standings

Pos	Driver	Points
1	(Australia) Will Power	239
2	(United Kingdom) Dario Franchitti	218
3	(New Zealand) Scott Dixon	169
4	(Spain) Oriol Servià	163
5	(Brazil) Tony Kanaan	159

- Note: Only the top five positions are included.

Previous race: 2011 Indianapolis 500	IZOD IndyCar Series; 2011 season	Next race: 2011 Milwaukee 225
Previous race: 2010 Firestone 550	Firestone Twin 275s	Next race: 2012 Firestone 550
