= 2008 Indianapolis 500 =

American motor race

92nd Indianapolis 500

Indianapolis Motor Speedway

Indianapolis 500
- Sanctioning body: Indy Racing League
- Season: 2008 IndyCar season
- Date: May 25, 2008
- Winner: (New Zealand) Scott Dixon
- Winning team: Chip Ganassi Racing
- Winning Chief Mechanic: Ricky Davis
- Time of race: 3:28:57.6792
- Average speed: 143.567 mph (231 km/h)
- Pole position: (New Zealand) Scott Dixon
- Pole speed: 226.366 mph (364 km/h)
- Fastest qualifier: (New Zealand) Scott Dixon
- Rookie of the Year: (United States) Ryan Hunter-Reay
- Most laps led: (New Zealand) Scott Dixon (115)

Pre-race ceremonies
- National anthem: Julianne Hough
- "Back Home Again in Indiana": Jim Nabors
- Starting command: Mari Hulman George
- Pace car: Chevrolet Corvette
- Pace car driver: Emerson Fittipaldi
- Starter: Bryan Howard
- Honorary starter: Kristi Yamaguchi
- Estimated attendance: 400,000+

Television in the United States
- Network: ESPN on ABC
- Announcers: Marty Reid, Scott Goodyear, Eddie Cheever
- Nielsen ratings: 4.5 / TBD

Chronology
| Previous | Next |
|---|---|
| 2007 | 2009 |

The 92nd Indianapolis 500 was held at the Indianapolis Motor Speedway in Speedway, Indiana on Sunday May 25, 2008. It was the fifth round of the 2008 IndyCar Series in DIRECTV HD season. Scott Dixon of New Zealand won the race from the pole position. It marked the first Indy 500 victory for Chip Ganassi Racing since 2000. Dixon led 115 laps (of 200), taking the lead for the final time during a sequence of yellow-flag pit stops on lap 172. Dixon held off Vítor Meira and Marco Andretti over the final 24 laps to secure the win.

The 2008 Indy 500 took place just three months after the "Open-wheel Unification" took place. An organizational "Split" had lasted from 1996 to 2007, fracturing the sport, dividing participants, and imbittering fans. For the first time since 1978, the sport of Indy Car racing was unified under one sanctioning body. The 2008 field featured a full complement of IndyCar Series regulars, as well as several teams and drivers from the now-shuttered Champ Car World Series. Following the organizational merger, the 2008 running was expected to be one of the most competitive in many years. However, most of the former Champ Car teams struggled a bit to adapt to the new equipment. The transitioning Champ Car teams were provided a fleet of IRL chassis for the season, but many were used having been sold off by defunct teams. IRL/IndyCar Series-based teams swept the top ten finishing positions, with the best former Champ Car team finishing 11th.

It was the first Indy 500 where all 33 qualifiers utilized the Dallara IR-03/IR-05 chassis, which first saw competition in the 2003 season. Phil Giebler failed to qualify with the Panoz chassis (formerly known as the G-Force GF09), the final appearance at Indy for the brand. Panoz had already ceased supporting their chassis program in 2006, effectively ushering in a four-year "spec" era. In addition, all full-time entries began utilizing semi-automatic paddle shifters in 2008. Paddle shifters for part-time Indy 500-only entries were optional due to cost reasons. IndyCar Series practice began May 4. Time trials took place over the two weekends prior to the race (May 10–11 and May 17–18). The final practice was held Friday May 23.

== Schedule ==
Race schedule — May 2008
| Sun | Mon | Tue | Wed | Thu | Fri | Sat |
|---|---|---|---|---|---|---|
| | | | | 1 | 2 | 3 Mini-Marathon |
| 4 ROP | 5 ROP | 6 Practice | 7 Practice | 8 Practice | 9 Practice | 10; Pole Day |
| 11; Time Trials | 12 | 13 | 14; Practice | 15; Practice | 16; Practice | 17; Time Trials |
| 18; Bump Day | 19 | 20 | 21; Comm. Day | 22; Lights Practice | 23; Carb Day; Freedom 100 | 24; Parade; Freedom 100 |
| 25; Indy 500 | 26; Memorial Day | 27 | 28 | 29 | 30 | 31 |

| Color | Notes |
|---|---|
| Green | Practice |
| Dark Blue | Time trials |
| Silver | Race day |
| Red | Rained out* |
| Blank | No track activity |

* Includes days where track activity
was significantly limited due to rain

ROP — denotes Rookie Orientation Program

Comm. Day — denotes 500 Festival Community Day

== Entry list ==
The official entry list was released April 11. The initial list featured 39 cars and 32 drivers. Additional drivers were announced during practice and qualifying. Ryan Hunter-Reay, the 2007 IndyCar Series rookie of the year was eligible to compete for the Rookie of the Year award, under race rules. Even though he was an established IndyCar driver, he had not yet made a start at Indianapolis. Several other former Champ Car drivers were individually evaluated and some were only required to take a "refresher" level test in lieu of the traditional four-phase rookie test.

== Practice (week 1) ==
=== Sunday May 4 - Rookie Orientation and Veteran Refreshers ===
- Weather: Sunny, blue skies, 63 °F (17 °C)
- Practice summary: Indianapolis Star Opening Day presents the Unsers started on-track activities for the month. The first day of rookie orientation opened with thirteen drivers eligible to participate. Each first-time starter must pass a four-phase rookie test before being allowed to practice with veterans and qualify. Graham Rahal, Oriol Servià, Ryan Hunter-Reay, Alex Lloyd, Hideki Mutoh, Will Power, Justin Wilson, Jaime Camara, E. J. Viso, and Jay Howard passed all four phases of the rookie test. Veteran Max Papis took part in a refresher test. Enrique Bernoldi completed 3 phases of his rookie test and Mario Moraes took to the track at the end of the day to shake his car down. The thirteen drivers turned 661 laps without incident.

Top Practice Speeds
| Rank | Car No. | Driver | Team | Best Speed |
|---|---|---|---|---|
| 1 | 8 | (Australia) Will Power | KV Racing | 220.694 mph (355 km/h) |
| 2 | 33 | (Venezuela) E. J. Viso | HVM Racing | 220.445 mph (355 km/h) |
| 3 | 5 | (Spain) Oriol Servià | KV Racing | 220.102 mph (354 km/h) |
OFFICIAL REPORT

=== Monday May 5 - Rookie Orientation and Veteran Refreshers ===
- Weather: Sunny, 69 °F (21 °C)
- Practice summary: The second day of orientation saw more cars on track and a significant increase in speeds. Enrique Bernoldi completed the fourth and final phase of his rookie test, bringing the total to 11 drivers who have done so. Davey Hamilton and Bruno Junqueira returned to the cockpit for a refresher session. Around 1 p.m., Jamie Camara did a half spin and crashed in turn one. Mario Domínguez and Mario Moraes completed the first three phases of their rookie tests and will be allowed to complete the fourth phase during open practice. Alex Lloyd set the fastest lap of the day late in the session at just over 223 mph (359 km/h), a speed that would put him tenth in the 2007 field in only his second day of practice. The sixteen cars on the track turned 655 laps.

Top Practice Speeds
| Rank | Car No. | Driver | Team | Best Speed |
|---|---|---|---|---|
| 1 | 16 | (United Kingdom) Alex Lloyd | Rahal Letterman Racing w/ CGR | 223.033 mph (359 km/h) |
| 2 | 27 | (Japan) Hideki Mutoh | Andretti Green Racing | 222.600 mph (358 km/h) |
| 3 | 8 | (Australia) Will Power | KV Racing | 222.267 mph (358 km/h) |
OFFICIAL REPORT

=== Tuesday May 6 - Practice ===
- Weather: Mostly cloudy, 82 °F (28 °C)
- Practice summary: The first day of veteran practice saw 33 car/driver combinations take to the Speedway. AGR teammates Marco Andretti and Tony Kanaan led the speed charts, with Ganassi and Penske entries also filling out the top ten. 2004 winner Buddy Rice put the Dreyer & Reinbold team back near the top of the speed chart for the first time in several years. No major incidents occurred. Early in the afternoon, Graham Rahal slid loose in the southchute, but maintained control and did not hit the wall. With rain in the forecast over the next two days, the participants logged 1,385 laps. Senator Hillary Clinton, in the Indianapolis area campaigning for the Indiana primary, visited the track as a guest of Sarah Fisher. Fisher went on to take her first laps on the track in the final hour of the session.

Top Practice Speeds
| Rank | Car No. | Driver | Team | Best Speed |
|---|---|---|---|---|
| 1 | 26 | (United States) Marco Andretti | Andretti Green Racing | 226.599 mph (365 km/h) |
| 2 | 11 | (Brazil) Tony Kanaan | Andretti Green Racing | 225.269 mph (363 km/h) |
| 3 | 9 | (New Zealand) Scott Dixon | Chip Ganassi Racing | 225.011 mph (362 km/h) |
OFFICIAL REPORT

=== Wednesday May 7 - Practice ===
- Weather: Rain, windy, 65 °F (18 °C)
- Practice summary: Practice was scheduled to begin at 12:00 p.m., but rain delayed the start. Twice the track was nearly dry and preparing to open, but both times rain returned. At 3:20 p.m., the track was closed for the day.

=== Thursday May 8 - Practice ===
- Weather: Rain, windy, 61 °F (16 °C)
- Practice summary: The rain from the previous day continued through the night and the day's on-track activities were canceled at approximately 1:45 p.m., when it was clear that the rain would not cease and the track could not be dried.

=== Friday May 9 - Fast Friday practice ===
- Weather: Cloudy, windy, 56 °F (13 °C)
- Practice summary: After two days of rainouts practice resumed. Despite cool temperatures, the final day of practice before pole qualifying saw intense action. About 90 minutes into the session, Mario Domínguez spun exiting the pits, and hit the inside wall, suffering suspension damage. At 1:40 p.m., Alex Lloyd crashed hard in turn one, spinning and hitting the wall again in turn two. Around 2:00 p.m. in the pit area, Danica Patrick's car struck a member from Mario Moraes' pit crew, Chuck Buckman, who suffered a concussion. At 3:15 p.m., the session was halted by rain, with Scott Dixon posting the fastest lap of the day to that point. At 4:00 p.m., the track was officially closed for the day.

Top Practice Speeds
| Rank | Car No. | Driver | Team | Best Speed |
|---|---|---|---|---|
| 1 | 9 | (New Zealand) Scott Dixon | Chip Ganassi Racing | 226.968 mph (365 km/h) |
| 2 | 26 | (United States) Marco Andretti | Andretti Green Racing | 226.710 mph (365 km/h) |
| 3 | 11 | (Brazil) Tony Kanaan | Andretti Green Racing | 226.688 mph (365 km/h) |
OFFICIAL REPORT

== Time trials (weekend 1) ==
=== Saturday May 10 - Pole Day ===
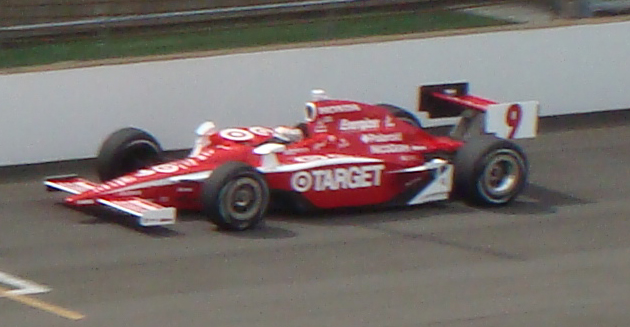
Scott Dixon makes his pole-winning qualification run.

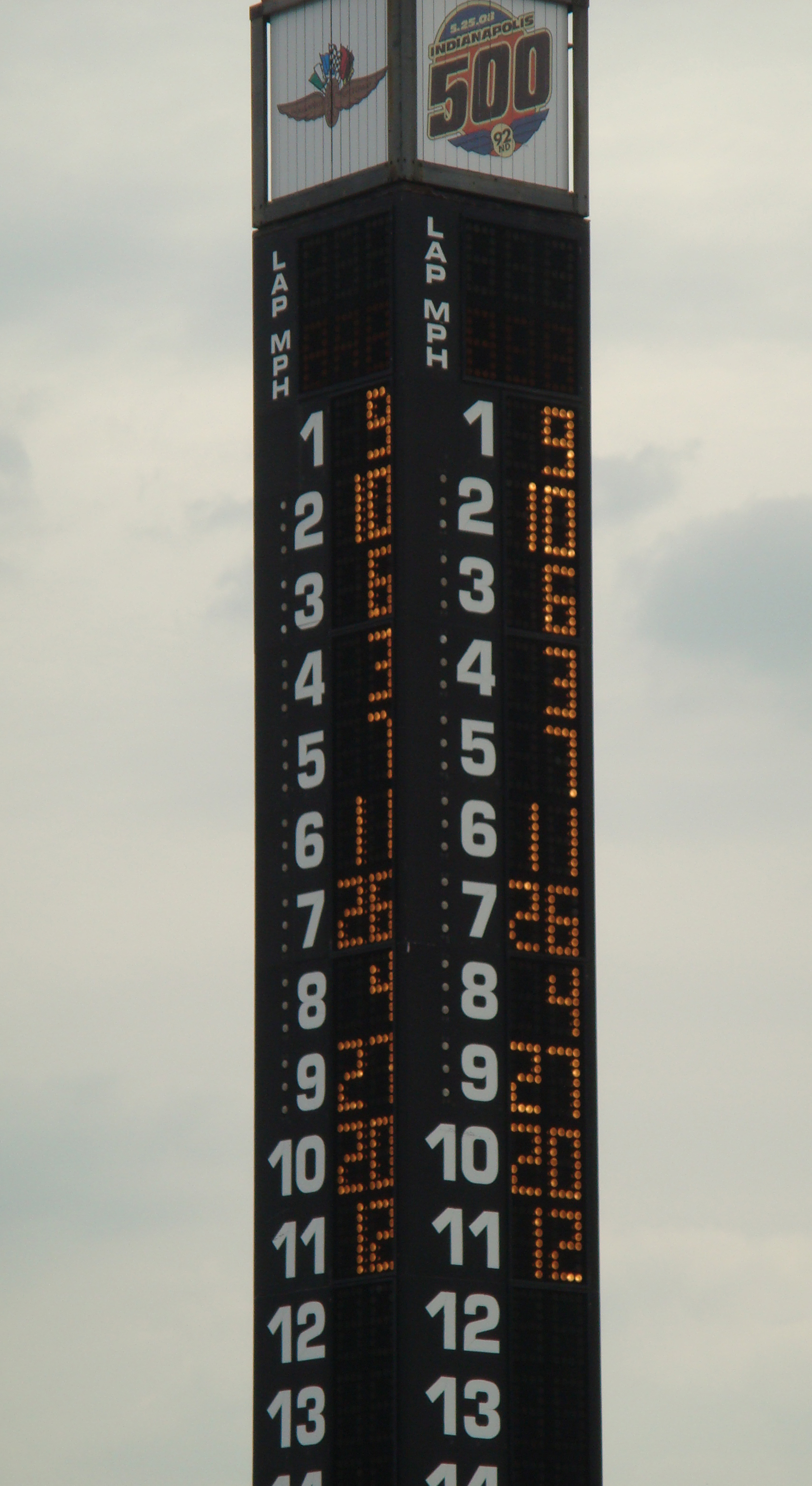
Scoring pylon at the close of pole day qualifications.

- Weather: Sunny, Blue skies, 64 °F (18 °C)
- Practice summary

Morning practice was delayed 45 minutes due to a slightly damp track from overnight rain. All of the cars were broken into two groups for practice. Marco Andretti set the fastest lap of the first session, and the fastest lap of the month at 228.318 mph. No incidents were reported.

Top Practice Speeds
| Rank | Car No. | Driver | Team | Best Speed |
|---|---|---|---|---|
| 1 | 26 | (United States) Marco Andretti | Andretti Green Racing | 228.318 mph (367 km/h) |
| 2 | 10 | (United Kingdom) Dan Wheldon | Chip Ganassi Racing | 227.223 mph (366 km/h) |
| 3 | 6 | (Australia) Ryan Briscoe | Penske Racing | 227.163 mph (366 km/h) |
OFFICIAL REPORT

- Qualifications summary

Ryan Briscoe was the first driver to make an attempt, turning a speed of 224.883 mph, which suggested that speeds would be lower than those which had been achieved in the morning practice by drafting. Danica Patrick later took over the provisional pole with a run over 225 mph. Hélio Castroneves then pulled out of line in favor of going out later in the day. Spins involving A. J. Foyt IV and Bruno Junqueira did not cause any damage.

After 11 positions were filled, bumping began. Dan Wheldon took to the track, and knocked Patrick from the provisional pole. In the mid-afternoon, Hideki Mutoh failed post-qualifying inspection when it was discovered that the housing for an on-board camera lacked the required ballast, and his previous qualification was disallowed.

Around 3 p.m., Hélio Castroneves had been practicing faster than Wheldon. He went out for his first attempt, but fell short of taking over the pole position. He did not rule out another attempt later in the day. At 3:34 p.m. Ryan Briscoe became the first driver to withdraw his earlier speed, and attempt to re-qualify. He knocked Wheldon from the top spot, only to be knocked down to second moments later by Scott Dixon.

The final hour concentrated largely on teams trying to bump their way into the top 11. Hideki Mutoh was successful, but Ryan Hunter-Reay crashed hard in turn 3. Former Champ Car entries Graham Rahal, Will Power and Justin Wilson all fell short of the top 11. Meanwhile, the AGR and Penske entries gave up on their efforts to secure the pole position, and pulled their cars out of line for the day. Dan Wheldon was the final driver to withdraw his speed and make a run for the pole. After two fast laps, his second two dropped off, and he settled for second position. When the gun sounded to close the track at 6:00 p.m., Scott Dixon won his first Indianapolis 500 pole position, and Chip Ganassi Racing secured their third Indy pole.

Pole Day Qualifying Results
| Rank | Car No. | Driver | Team | Qual. Speed |
|---|---|---|---|---|
| 1 | 9 | (New Zealand) Scott Dixon | Chip Ganassi Racing | 226.366 mph (364 km/h) |
| 2 | 10 | (United Kingdom) Dan Wheldon | Chip Ganassi Racing | 226.110 mph (364 km/h) |
| 3 | 6 | (Australia) Ryan Briscoe | Penske Racing | 226.080 mph (364 km/h) |
| 4 | 3 | (Brazil) Hélio Castroneves | Penske Racing | 225.733 mph (363 km/h) |
| 5 | 7 | (United States) Danica Patrick | Andretti Green Racing | 225.197 mph (362 km/h) |
| 6 | 11 | (Brazil) Tony Kanaan | Andretti Green Racing | 224.794 mph (362 km/h) |
| 7 | 26 | (United States) Marco Andretti | Andretti Green Racing | 224.417 mph (361 km/h) |
| 8 | 4 | (Brazil) Vítor Meira | Panther Racing | 224.346 mph (361 km/h) |
| 9 | 27 | (Japan) Hideki Mutoh | Andretti Green Racing | 223.887 mph (360 km/h) |
| 10 | 20 | (United States) Ed Carpenter | Vision Racing | 223.835 mph (360 km/h) |
| 11 | 12 | (South Africa) Tomas Scheckter | Luczo-Dragon Racing | 223.496 mph (360 km/h) |
OFFICIAL REPORT

=== Sunday May 11 - Second Day ===
- Weather: Rain, 51 °F (11 °C)
- Qualifications summary: Rain cancelled all track activity for the day. Around 12:25 p.m., with continuing rain in the forecast, the track was officially closed. Starting positions 12-33 will be filled during the third day of qualifying, Saturday May 17.

== Practice (week 2) ==
=== Wednesday May 14 - Practice ===
- Weather: Fog & mist, 61 °F (16 °C)
- Practice summary: The start of practice was delayed 4 hours, 56 minutes due to persistent misty drizzle at the track following overnight rainstorms. In the short session, 29 drivers turned 390 laps, led by Scott Dixon at 222.834 mph (359 km/h) who turned 17 laps while working with full fuel tanks on his race setup. Jeff Simmons and Roger Yasukawa turned their first laps of the month, making 16 and 15 circuits respectively. John Andretti turned the fastest lap among drivers not yet in the field with a speed of 221.386 mph (356 km/h).

Top Practice Speeds
| Rank | Car No. | Driver | Team | Best Speed |
|---|---|---|---|---|
| 1 | 9 | (New Zealand) Scott Dixon | Chip Ganassi Racing | 222.834 mph (359 km/h) |
| 2 | 10 | (United Kingdom) Dan Wheldon | Chip Ganassi Racing | 222.810 mph (359 km/h) |
| 3 | 26 | (United States) Marco Andretti | Andretti Green Racing | 222.801 mph (359 km/h) |
OFFICIAL REPORT

=== Thursday May 15 - Practice ===
- Weather: Cloudy, 63 °F (17 °C)
- Practice summary: With rain in the forecast for most of the afternoon, 35 cars took to the track anxiously, completing 2,628 laps, the most of any single practice day all month. The rain, however, held off nearly all day, and began falling only 18 minutes before the track was scheduled to close. Most cars concentrated on race set-ups, while some of the non-qualified entries simulated time trial runs. No incidents were reported. Among drivers who had not yet qualified, the fastest lap was driven by Will Power, at 222.657 mph (358 km/h).

Top Practice Speeds
| Rank | Car No. | Driver | Team | Best Speed |
|---|---|---|---|---|
| 1 | 6 | (Australia) Ryan Briscoe | Penske Racing | 223.708 mph (360 km/h) |
| 2 | 3 | (Brazil) Hélio Castroneves | Penske Racing | 223.284 mph (359 km/h) |
| 3 | 9 | (New Zealand) Scott Dixon | Chip Ganassi Racing | 223.192 mph (359 km/h) |
OFFICIAL REPORT

=== Friday May 16 - Practice ===
- Weather: Partly cloudy, 63 °F (17 °C)
- Practice summary: The final full day of practice saw heavy action. Pole winner Scott Dixon led the overall speed chart for the second time in two days. Of the non-qualified cars Will Power was the quickest. 1996 winner Buddy Lazier took his first laps of the month, while another second-week driver, Phil Giebler, was unable to make an on-track appearance. Three crashes, involving Ryan Briscoe, Will Power, and a less-serious one by E. J. Viso, brought the total of practice crashes to six for the month. Briscoe's crash occurred in his back-up car, while Power's must be repaired before qualifying. A total of 37 drivers and 40 cars took practice laps to date during the month.

Top Practice Speeds
| Rank | Car No. | Driver | Team | Best Speed |
|---|---|---|---|---|
| 1 | 9 | (New Zealand) Scott Dixon | Chip Ganassi Racing | 223.713 mph (360 km/h) |
| 2 | 3 | (Brazil) Hélio Castroneves | Penske Racing | 223.411 mph (360 km/h) |
| 3 | 6 | (Australia) Ryan Briscoe | Penske Racing | 223.372 mph (359 km/h) |
OFFICIAL REPORT

== Time trials (weekend 2) ==
=== Saturday May 17 - Third Day ===
- Weather: tba
- Practice summary

The morning practice session was marred by two crashes late in the session. Mario Domínguez wrecked in the first turn, his second crash of the month. Minutes later, Max Papis crashed hard in turn three. John Andretti led the speed chart at 224.027 mph.

Top Practice Speeds
| Rank | Car No. | Driver | Team | Best Speed |
|---|---|---|---|---|
| 1 | 24 | (United States) John Andretti | Roth Racing | 224.027 mph (361 km/h) |
| 2 | 18 | (Brazil) Bruno Junqueira | Dale Coyne Racing | 223.683 mph (360 km/h) |
| 3 | 22 | (United States) Davey Hamilton | Vision Racing | 223.638 mph (360 km/h) |
OFFICIAL REPORT

- Qualifications summary

The third day of qualifications saw the field filled to 33 cars with Townsend Bell fastest of the day at 222.529 mph. Two additional crashes, along with mechanical problems, however, altered the field of non-qualified cars.

Seventeen minutes into the qualifying session, after four cars had completed runs, a light rain shower halted track activity for 15 minutes. Oriol Servia, who was on the track when the rain fell, was allowed to re-attempt without penalty. Several former Champ Car drivers including Graham Rahal, Justin Wilson, and Will Power all qualified safely.

For the second time in Indy history, three female drivers made the field, after Milka Duno and Sarah Fisher completed runs. A break in the qualifying line occurred around 2 p.m., with former champion Buddy Lazier the slowest in the field, and only one spot remaining.

Just before 4 p.m., Hideki Mutoh crashed his already-qualified car. On the exit of turn two, his car went high in the groove, and brushed along the wall part way down the backstretch. About 25 minutes later, Phil Giebler, in his first significant on-track laps, crashed hard in turn one. He was taken to Methodist Hospital.

With less than 15 minutes left in the day, A. J. Foyt IV and Marty Roth looked to make their way into the field. Foyt suffered a gearbox failure during his warm-up lap, and returned to the pits. Roth immediately went out and filled the final qualifying spot, albeit as the slowest overall in the field. Foyt's Vision crew scrambled to put the gearbox back together, in hopes of bumping into the field before the 6 o'clock gun. The team ran out of time, however, and was forced to wait until Sunday to make a qualifying attempt.

Third Day Qualifying Results
| Rank | Car No. | Driver | Team | Qual. Speed |
|---|---|---|---|---|
| 12 | 99 | (United States) Townsend Bell | Dreyer & Reinbold Racing | 222.539 mph (358 km/h) |
| 13 | 06 | (United States) Graham Rahal | Newman/Haas/Lanigan Racing | 222.531 mph (358 km/h) |
| 14 | 14 | (United Kingdom) Darren Manning | A. J. Foyt Enterprises | 222.430 mph (358 km/h) |
| 15 | 18 | (Brazil) Bruno Junqueira | Dale Coyne Racing | 222.330 mph (358 km/h) |
| 16 | 02 | (United Kingdom) Justin Wilson | Newman/Haas/Lanigan Racing | 222.267 mph (358 km/h) |
| 17 | 15 | (United States) Buddy Rice | Dreyer & Reinbold Racing | 222.101 mph (357 km/h) |
| 18 | 22 | (United States) Davey Hamilton | Vision Racing | 222.017 mph (357 km/h) |
| 19 | 16 | (United Kingdom) Alex Lloyd | Rahal Letterman Racing w/ CGR | 221.788 mph (357 km/h) |
| 20 | 17 | (United States) Ryan Hunter-Reay | Rahal Letterman Racing | 221.579 mph (357 km/h) |
| 21 | 24 | (United States) John Andretti | Roth Racing | 221.550 mph (357 km/h) |
| 22 | 67 | (United States) Sarah Fisher | Sarah Fisher Racing | 221.246 mph (356 km/h) |
| 23 | 8 | (Australia) Will Power | KV Racing | 221.136 mph (356 km/h) |
| 24 | 41 | (United States) Jeff Simmons | A. J. Foyt Enterprises | 221.103 mph (356 km/h) |
| 25 | 5 | (Spain) Oriol Servià | KV Racing | 220.767 mph (355 km/h) |
| 26 | 33 | (Venezuela) E. J. Viso | HVM Racing | 220.356 mph (355 km/h) |
| 27 | 23 | (Venezuela) Milka Duno | Dreyer & Reinbold Racing | 220.305 mph (355 km/h) |
| 28 | 19 | (Brazil) Mario Moraes | Dale Coyne Racing | 219.716 mph (354 km/h) |
| 29 | 36 | (Brazil) Enrique Bernoldi | Conquest Racing | 219.422 mph (353 km/h) |
| 30 | 34 | (Brazil) Jaime Camara | Conquest Racing | 219.345 mph (353 km/h) |
| 31 | 98 | (United States) Roger Yasukawa | CURB/Agajanian/Beck Motorsports | 218.010 mph (351 km/h) |
| 32 | 91 | (United States) Buddy Lazier | Hemelgarn Racing | 217.939 mph (351 km/h) |
| 33 | 25 | (Canada) Marty Roth | Roth Racing | 215.506 mph (347 km/h) |
OFFICIAL REPORT

=== Sunday May 18 - Bump Day ===
- Weather: tba
- Practice summary

A. J. Foyt IV, still unqualified for the field, led morning practice at 219.184 mph (353 km/h). Also spending time on the track were Marty Roth, Buddy Lazier, Mario Domínguez, and Davey Hamilton who blew a motor late in the session.

Top Practice Speeds
| Rank | Car No. | Driver | Team | Best Speed |
|---|---|---|---|---|
| 1 | 9 | (New Zealand) Scott Dixon | Chip Ganassi Racing | 221.514 mph (356 km/h) |
| 2 | 10 | (United Kingdom) Dan Wheldon | Chip Ganassi Racing | 220.653 mph (355 km/h) |
| 3 | 06 | (United States) Graham Rahal | Newman/Haas/Lanigan Racing | 220.627 mph (355 km/h) |
OFFICIAL REPORT

- Qualifications summary

Shortly after the track opened for time trials, A. J. Foyt IV easily bumped his way into the field, bumping Marty Roth in the process. Later in the afternoon, Roth was able to secure a spot by bumping Buddy Lazier.

After qualifying, A. J. Foyt IV took his car out for practice. The fuel buckeye cover broke off after he exited the pits, and in turn three, a fire started on the side of the car, causing him to spin and crash into the wall. The car was heavily damaged. With Roger Yasukawa on the bubble, Mario Domínguez made his first attempt to qualify, but was too slow.

In the final half hour, the unqualified cars made their final attempts. Buddy Lazier's first attempt was too slow, and his team waved off after three laps. Mario Domínguez made his second attempt, and was able to bump Roger Yasukawa from the field. Yasukawa was the next to go out, and missed bumping his way back into the field by 0.046 seconds. Max Papis lined up to make an attempt, but lingering clutch problems prevented him from pulling out of the pits. With about 13 minutes remaining, Lazier returned to the track after some adjustments, and found enough speed to bump Dominguez. Dominguez made one final attempt to make the field, taking the green flag just before the 6 o'clock gun. After one lap that was fast enough to bump Marty Roth, he lost control and crashed in turn one. Roth and Lazier held on to make the field, while Papis was left waiting in line.

Bump Day Qualifying Results
| Rank | Car No. | Driver | Team | Qual. Speed |
|---|---|---|---|---|
| 31 | 2 | (United States) A. J. Foyt IV | Vision Racing | 219.184 mph (353 km/h) |
| 32 | 91 | (United States) Buddy Lazier | Hemelgarn Racing | 219.015 mph (352 km/h) |
| 33 | 25 | (Canada) Marty Roth | Roth Racing | 218.965 mph (352 km/h) |
OFFICIAL REPORT

== Carb Day ==
=== Practice - Friday May 23 ===
- Weather: Rain, 60°
- Practice summary: Practice was cancelled after only eleven minutes due to a drenching rain. 32 drivers had taken practice laps, with Dan Wheldon fastest at 223.934 mph (360.387 km/h). Ryan Briscoe was the only car not to take any laps, and seven drivers managed only warm-up laps. The 32nd annual McDonald's Pit Stop Challenge was to follow the final practice. However, due to the rain, the event was cancelled for the first time ever. The Firestone Freedom 100 was rescheduled for Saturday, while the Stone Temple Pilots concert went on as planned.

== Starting grid ==
| Row | Inside | | Middle | | Outside | |
|---|---|---|---|---|---|---|
| 1 | 9 | (New Zealand) Scott Dixon | 10 | (United Kingdom) Dan Wheldon W | 6 | (Australia) Ryan Briscoe |
| 2 | 3 | (Brazil) Hélio Castroneves W | 7 | (United States) Danica Patrick | 11 | (Brazil) Tony Kanaan |
| 3 | 26 | (United States) Marco Andretti | 4 | (Brazil) Vítor Meira | 27 | (Japan) Hideki Mutoh R |
| 4 | 20 | (United States) Ed Carpenter | 12 | (South Africa) Tomas Scheckter | 99 | (United States) Townsend Bell |
| 5 | 06 | (United States) Graham Rahal R | 14 | (United Kingdom) Darren Manning | 18 | (Brazil) Bruno Junqueira |
| 6 | 02 | (United Kingdom) Justin Wilson R | 15 | (United States) Buddy Rice W | 22 | (United States) Davey Hamilton |
| 7 | 16 | (United Kingdom) Alex Lloyd R | 17 | (United States) Ryan Hunter-Reay R | 24 | (United States) John Andretti |
| 8 | 67 | (United States) Sarah Fisher | 8 | (Australia) Will Power R | 41 | (United States) Jeff Simmons |
| 9 | 5 | (Spain) Oriol Servià R | 33 | (Venezuela) E. J. Viso R | 23 | (Venezuela) Milka Duno |
| 10 | 19 | (Brazil) Mario Moraes R | 36 | (Brazil) Enrique Bernoldi R | 34 | (Brazil) Jaime Camara R |
| 11 | 2 | (United States) A. J. Foyt IV | 91 | (United States) Buddy Lazier W | 25 | (Canada) Marty Roth |
OFFICIAL REPORT

- W = Former Indianapolis 500 winner
- R = Indianapolis 500 rookie

Failed to qualify

| No. | Driver | Team | Reason |
|---|---|---|---|
| 44 | (Italy) Max Papis | Rubicon Race Team | Clutch problems during qualifying. |
| 88 | (United States) Phil Giebler | American Dream Motorsports | Practice crash. Team could not secure a back-up car. |
| 96 | (Mexico) Mario Domínguez R | Pacific Coast Motorsports | Bumped. Wrecked on final qualifying attempt. |
| 98 | (United States) Roger Yasukawa | Beck Motorsports | Too slow on day 4. Bumped from the field. |

== Race summary ==
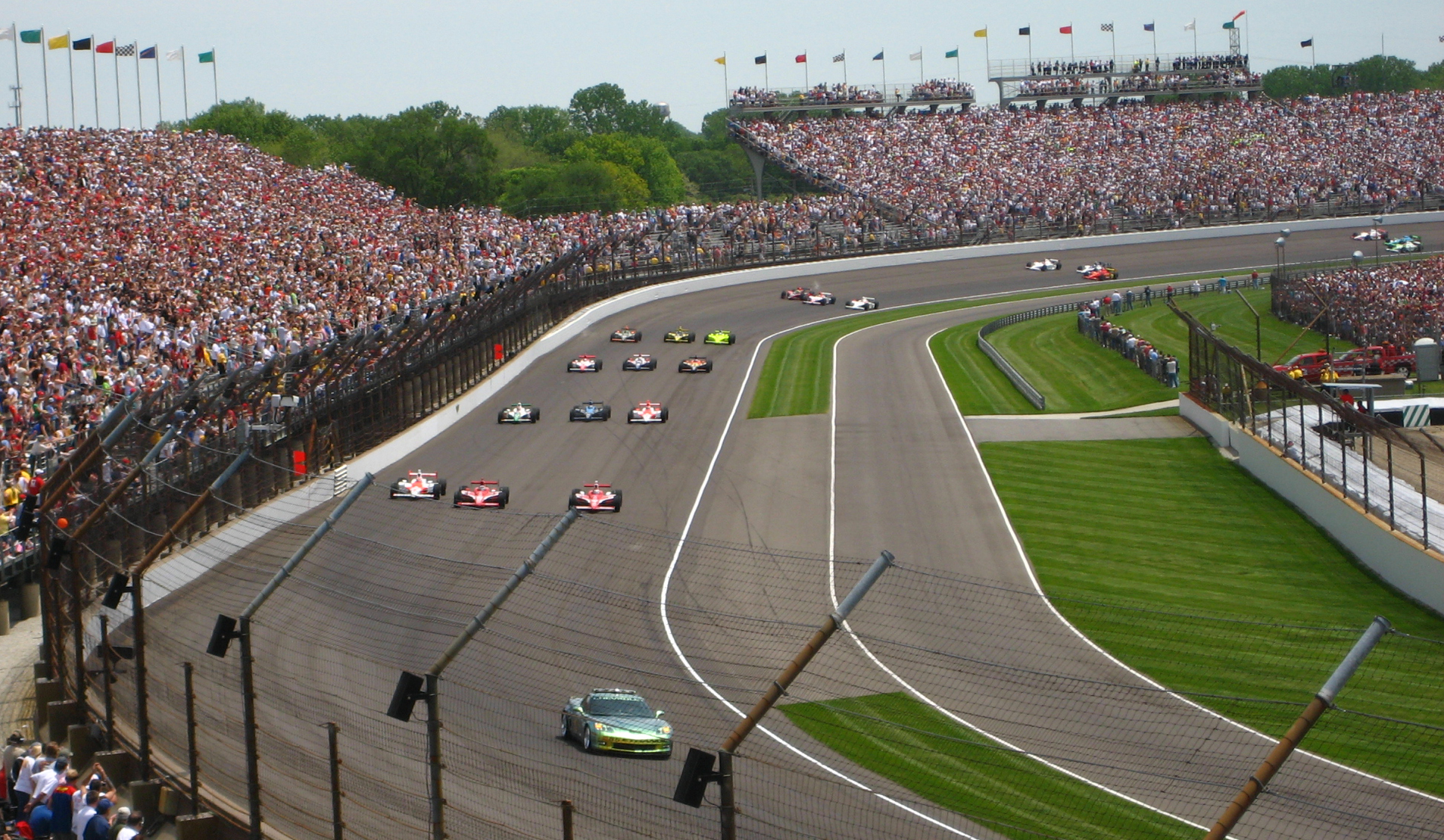
The field entering turn 4, aligned for the start.

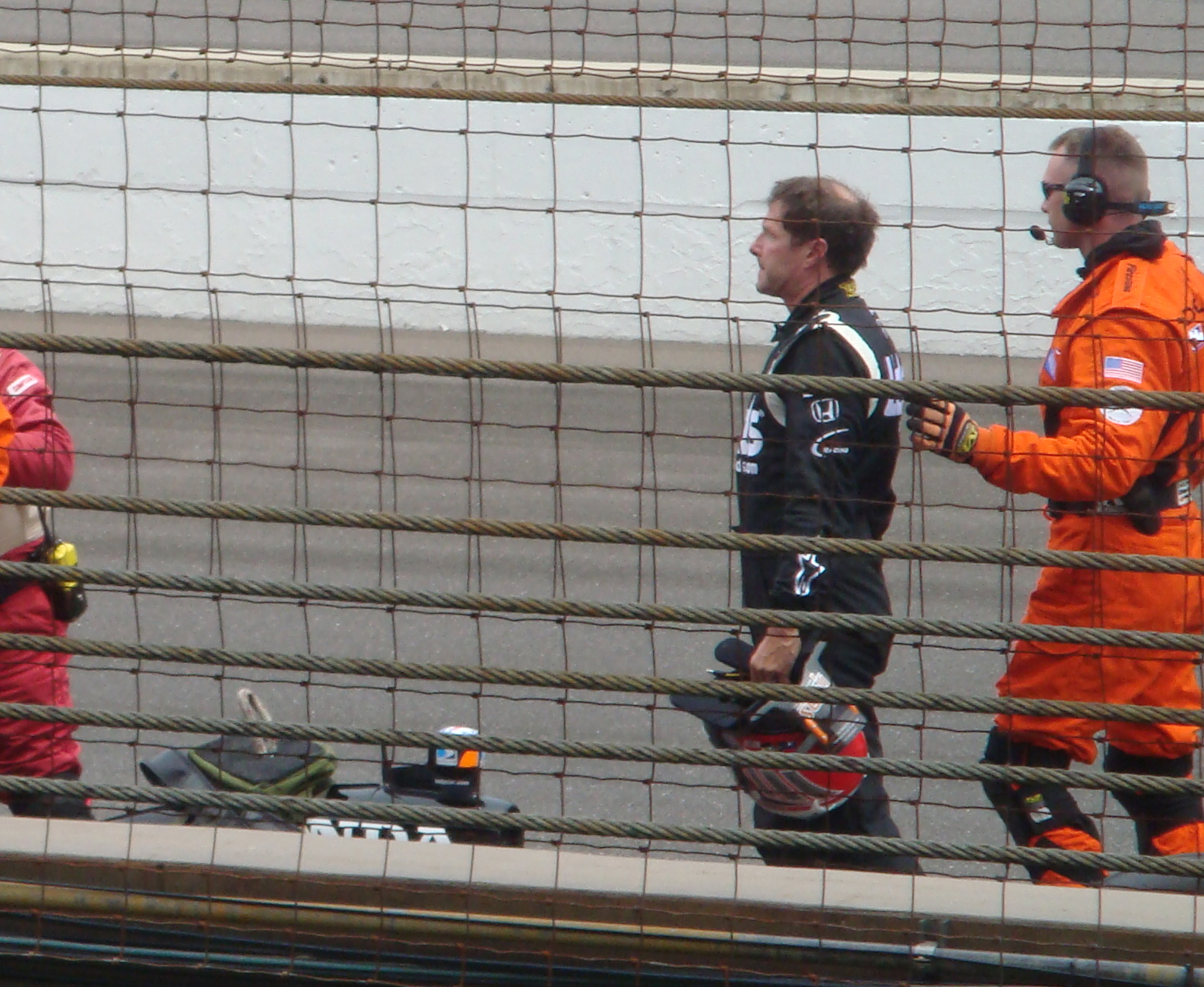
Marty Roth (in black) after exiting his damaged car.

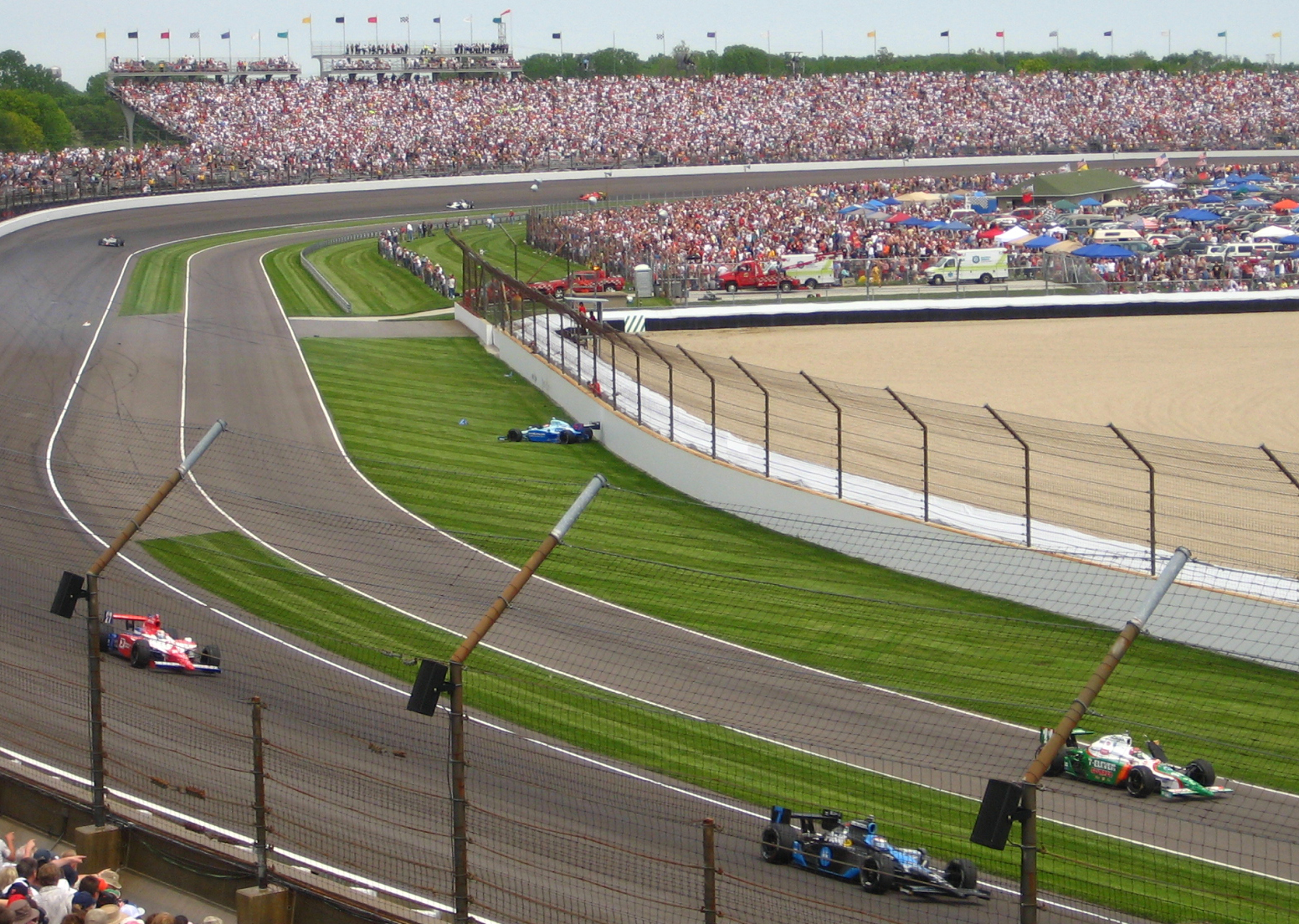
Tony Kanaan drives his damaged car (green and white) through the warm-up lane while Sarah Fisher rests against the inside wall.

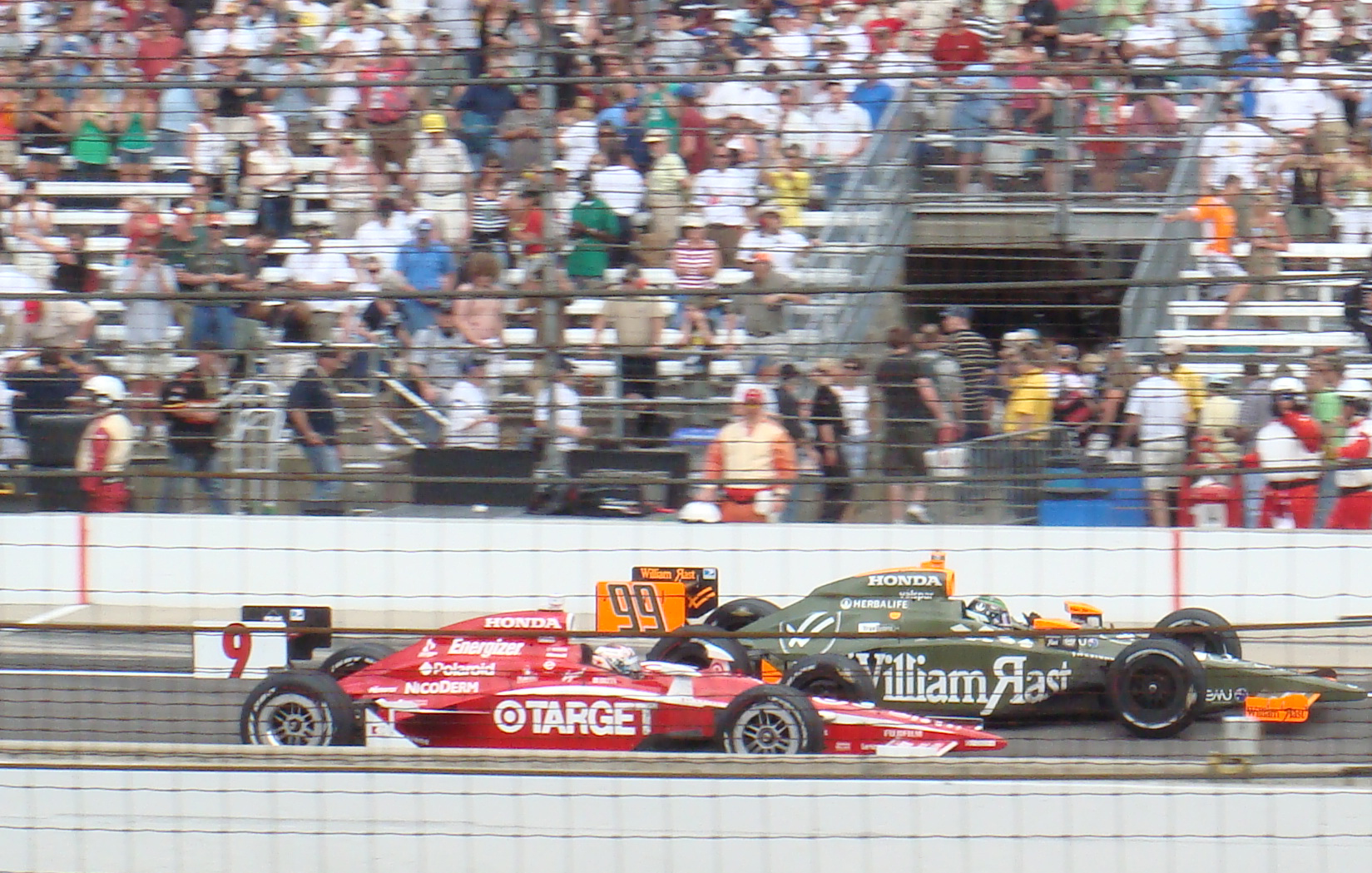
Scott Dixon (#9), takes a victory lap after winning the 2008 Indianapolis 500.

Video sample from race

=== Start ===
At 1:03 p.m., Mari Hulman George gave the command to start engines. All cars except Sarah Fisher pulled away, but Fisher quickly caught up to the field. Emerson Fittipaldi was booed during the parade laps due to his incident where he drank orange juice instead of milk after winning in 1993. He pulled the pace car off the track after the third pace lap, and a well-aligned field took the green flag. Polesitter Scott Dixon took the lead into turn one, and led the first two laps. His teammate Dan Wheldon took the lead on lap three. On the 8th lap, Bruno Junqueira lost a mirror, and the first of many caution periods slowed the field.

=== First half ===
Nearly the entire field pitted on the first caution, with Buddy Rice staying out to lead. Sarah Fisher also stayed out, and moved to third. Moments later, she spun in the north chute while warming her tires, and lost 3 laps. When the green resumed, Dan Wheldon quickly regained the lead. He held it until lap 36, when Dixon passed him. At the same time, rookie Graham Rahal drifted high and hit the wall exiting turn four.

Marty Roth and Jaime Camara each brought out the yellow in the first half, suffering single-car crashes. Wheldon and Dixon continued to trade the lead.

On lap 94, Tony Kanaan charged into the lead. He set a new all-time record by leading a lap in seven consecutive Indy 500 races. He broke Rick Mears' record of six straight races led (1979–1984). His continuing bad luck at Indy returned however 11 laps later. Scott Dixon took the lead back on lap 105. Marco Andretti, Kanaan's AGR teammate, dove low in turn three to overtake, which was followed by Kanaan going high and into the marbles. Kanaan lost control of his car, brushing the wall, then collecting the lapped car of Sarah Fisher. Both cars were heavily damaged. The caution was then extended when Jeff Simmons car suddenly veered and hit the inside wall on the frontstretch.

=== Second half ===
Marco Andretti gained the lead on lap 122. Dixon ran second, while Wheldon began to slip deep in the standings with handling problems. Justin Wilson brought out the yellow in turn 2 on lap 133 with yet another single-car crash. His crash was followed 20 laps later by Alex Lloyd, who brushed the wall in turn 4, and spun wildly into the pit area. Tomas Scheckter, who had been running amongst the leaders all afternoon, dropped out with a broken driveshaft.

On the lap 159 restart, Vítor Meira went three-wide and stormed into the lead. With Dixon second and Andretti third, the stage was set to decide the race between those three drivers. Other contenders, Hélio Castroneves, Ed Carpenter, Danica Patrick, Ryan Briscoe, Oriol Servia and rookie Ryan Hunter-Reay, were battling for the balance of the top ten.

On lap 169, Milka Duno dove below Buddy Lazier in turn three. The two cars touched slightly, and Duno spun to the warm-up lane. She suffered a flat tire, but was able to continue. The leaders all headed to the pits on lap 171 for what would be the final sequence of pit stops. At pit exit, Ryan Briscoe swung wide and clipped the right rear of Danica Patrick's car. Patrick spun around, and Briscoe hit the pit wall. Both cars were eliminated. Patrick climbed out of the car, and started walking down towards the Team Penske pits, presumably to confront Briscoe. A security guard intervened, and she later walked back to her pit stall. Patrick and Briscoe were called to the Indycar hauler after the race. Patrick and Briscoe were fined $100,000 and were placed on probation until the end of the 2008 season for an aggressive pit incident.

=== Finish ===
While most of the attention in the moment was focused on the Briscoe/Patrick incident, Scott Dixon took over the lead. His crew completed a 7-second pit stop, and beat Vitor Meira out of the pits. With 24 laps to go, the green came out with Dixon first, Meira second, and Marco Andretti third. The race went green the remainder of the distance, and Dixon held on by 1.7498 seconds to win his first Indianapolis 500. He became the 19th pole winner to win the race, and the first winner from New Zealand.

== Box score ==
| Finish | No. | Driver | Team | Chassis | Engine | Laps | Status | Grid | Points |
|---|---|---|---|---|---|---|---|---|---|
| 1 | 9 | (New Zealand) Scott Dixon | Chip Ganassi Racing | Dallara | Honda | 200 | 143.567 mph | 1 | 53 |
| 2 | 4 | (Brazil) Vítor Meira | Panther Racing | Dallara | Honda | 200 | +1.7498 | 8 | 40 |
| 3 | 26 | (United States) Marco Andretti | Andretti Green Racing | Dallara | Honda | 200 | +2.3127 | 7 | 35 |
| 4 | 3 | (Brazil) Hélio Castroneves W | Team Penske | Dallara | Honda | 200 | +6.2619 | 4 | 32 |
| 5 | 20 | (United States) Ed Carpenter | Vision Racing | Dallara | Honda | 200 | +6.5505 | 10 | 30 |
| 6 | 17 | (United States) Ryan Hunter-Reay R | Rahal Letterman Racing | Dallara | Honda | 200 | +6.9894 | 20 | 28 |
| 7 | 27 | (Japan) Hideki Mutoh R | Andretti Green Racing | Dallara | Honda | 200 | +7.8768 | 9 | 26 |
| 8 | 15 | (United States) Buddy Rice W | Dreyer & Reinbold Racing | Dallara | Honda | 200 | +8.8798 | 17 | 24 |
| 9 | 14 | (United Kingdom) Darren Manning | A. J. Foyt Enterprises | Dallara | Honda | 200 | +9.2019 | 14 | 22 |
| 10 | 99 | (United States) Townsend Bell | Dreyer & Reinbold Racing | Dallara | Honda | 200 | +9.4567 | 12 | 20 |
| 11 | 5 | (Spain) Oriol Servià R | KV Racing | Dallara | Honda | 200 | +22.4966 | 25 | 19 |
| 12 | 10 | (United Kingdom) Dan Wheldon W | Chip Ganassi Racing | Dallara | Honda | 200 | +30.7090 | 2 | 18 |
| 13 | 8 | (Australia) Will Power R | KV Racing | Dallara | Honda | 200 | +31.6666 | 23 | 17 |
| 14 | 22 | (United States) Davey Hamilton | Vision Racing | Dallara | Honda | 200 | +32.0084 | 18 | 16 |
| 15 | 36 | (Brazil) Enrique Bernoldi R | Conquest Racing | Dallara | Honda | 200 | +32.1075 | 29 | 15 |
| 16 | 24 | (United States) John Andretti | Roth Racing | Dallara | Honda | 199 | -1 Lap | 21 | 14 |
| 17 | 91 | (United States) Buddy Lazier W | Hemelgarn Racing | Dallara | Honda | 195 | -5 Laps | 32 | 13 |
| 18 | 19 | (Brazil) Mario Moraes R | Dale Coyne Racing | Dallara | Honda | 194 | -6 Laps | 28 | 12 |
| 19 | 23 | (Venezuela) Milka Duno | Dreyer & Reinbold Racing | Dallara | Honda | 185 | -15 Laps | 27 | 12 |
| 20 | 18 | (Brazil) Bruno Junqueira | Dale Coyne Racing | Dallara | Honda | 184 | -16 Laps | 15 | 12 |
| 21 | 2 | (United States) A. J. Foyt IV | Vision Racing | Dallara | Honda | 180 | -20 Laps | 31 | 12 |
| 22 | 7 | (United States) Danica Patrick | Andretti Green Racing | Dallara | Honda | 171 | Collision | 5 | 12 |
| 23 | 6 | (Australia) Ryan Briscoe | Team Penske | Dallara | Honda | 171 | Collision | 3 | 12 |
| 24 | 12 | (South Africa) Tomas Scheckter | Luczo-Dragon Racing | Dallara | Honda | 156 | Mechanical | 11 | 12 |
| 25 | 16 | (United Kingdom) Alex Lloyd R | Rahal Letterman Racing w/Chip Ganassi Racing | Dallara | Honda | 151 | Accident | 19 | 10 |
| 26 | 33 | (Venezuela) E. J. Viso R | HVM Racing | Dallara | Honda | 139 | Mechanical | 26 | 10 |
| 27 | 02 | (United Kingdom) Justin Wilson R | Newman/Haas/Lanigan Racing | Dallara | Honda | 132 | Accident | 16 | 10 |
| 28 | 41 | (United States) Jeff Simmons | A.J. Foyt Racing | Dallara | Honda | 112 | Accident | 24 | 10 |
| 29 | 11 | (Brazil) Tony Kanaan | Andretti Green Racing | Dallara | Honda | 105 | Collision | 6 | 10 |
| 30 | 67 | (United States) Sarah Fisher | Sarah Fisher Racing | Dallara | Honda | 103 | Collision | 22 | 10 |
| 31 | 34 | (Brazil) Jaime Camara R | Conquest Racing | Dallara | Honda | 79 | Accident | 30 | 10 |
| 32 | 25 | (Canada) Marty Roth | Roth Racing | Dallara | Honda | 59 | Accident | 33 | 10 |
| 33 | 06 | (United States) Graham Rahal R | Newman/Haas/Lanigan Racing | Dallara | Honda | 36 | Accident | 13 | 10 |

W Former Indianapolis 500 winner

R Indianapolis 500 Rookie

All entrants utilized Firestone tires.

=== Race statistics ===
Lap Leaders
| Laps | Leader |
|---|---|
| 1–2 | Scott Dixon |
| 3–9 | Dan Wheldon |
| 10–11 | Bruno Junqueira |
| 12–19 | Buddy Rice |
| 20–35 | Dan Wheldon |
| 36–74 | Scott Dixon |
| 75–79 | Dan Wheldon |
| 80–91 | Scott Dixon |
| 92–93 | Dan Wheldon |
| 94–105 | Tony Kanaan |
| 106–121 | Scott Dixon |
| 122–136 | Marco Andretti |
| 137–138 | Mario Moraes |
| 139 | Marco Andretti |
| 140–155 | Scott Dixon |
| 156–158 | Ed Carpenter |
| 159 | Scott Dixon |
| 160–171 | Vítor Meira |
| 172–200 | Scott Dixon |

Total laps led
| Driver | Laps |
|---|---|
| Scott Dixon | 115 |
| Dan Wheldon | 30 |
| Marco Andretti | 15 |
| Vítor Meira | 12 |
| Tony Kanaan | 12 |
| Buddy Rice | 8 |
| Mario Moraes | 3 |
| Ed Carpenter | 3 |
| Bruno Junqueira | 2 |

Cautions: 8 for 69 laps
| Laps | Reason |
|---|---|
| 8–16 | Debris |
| 37–44 | Graham Rahal crash in turn 4 |
| 61–71 | Marty Roth crash in turn 4 |
| 80–90 | Jaime Camara crash in turn 1 |
| 106–116 | Tony Kanaan, Sarah Fisher crash in turn 3 |
| 133–138 | Justin Wilson crash southchute |
| 153–158 | Alex Lloyd crash at pit entrance |
| 169–175 | Milka Duno spin in turn 3 |

== Broadcasting ==
=== Television ===
The race was televised in high definition in the United States on ABC, the 44th consecutive year on that network. Time trials were shown live in high definition on ABC, ESPN, and ESPN2 at various timeslots and was available via broadband at MediaZone.com.

1998 Indianapolis 500 winner Eddie Cheever joined the announcing crew for the first time. For the first time, two hours of pre-race was aired, one hour on ESPN2, followed by one hour on ABC. For the third year in a row, the telecast utilized the Side-by-Side format for commercial breaks.

ABC Television
| Booth Announcers | Pit/garage reporters |
|---|---|
| Host: Brent Musburger; Announcer: Marty Reid; Color: Scott Goodyear; Color: Eddie Cheever | Jack Arute; Vince Welch; Brienne Pedigo; Jamie Little |

=== Radio ===
The race was broadcast on radio by the IMS Radio Network for the 56th consecutive year. Mike King served as anchor. For the second year in a row, Davey Hamilton offered live in-car reporting during caution periods. Chris Economaki offered pre-race and post-race commentary for the final time. This was also the last time that former 'voice' of the 500 Bob Jenkins served as a turn announcer.

For the fourth year in a row, Kevin Olson conducted his annual pre-race interview with David Letterman.

Indianapolis Motor Speedway Radio Network
| Booth Announcers | Turn Reporters | Pit/garage reporters |
|---|---|---|
| Chief Announcer: Mike King; Driver expert: Johnny Parsons; Color: Dave Wilson; Historian: Donald Davidson; Live in-car reports: Davey Hamilton; Commentary: Chris Economaki | Turn 1: Jerry Baker; Turn 2: Bob Jenkins; Turn 3: Mark Jaynes; Turn 4: Chris Denari | Jake Query (north pits); Kevin Olson (north-center pits); Dave Argabright (south-center pits); Kevin Lee (south pits) |

== Gallery ==
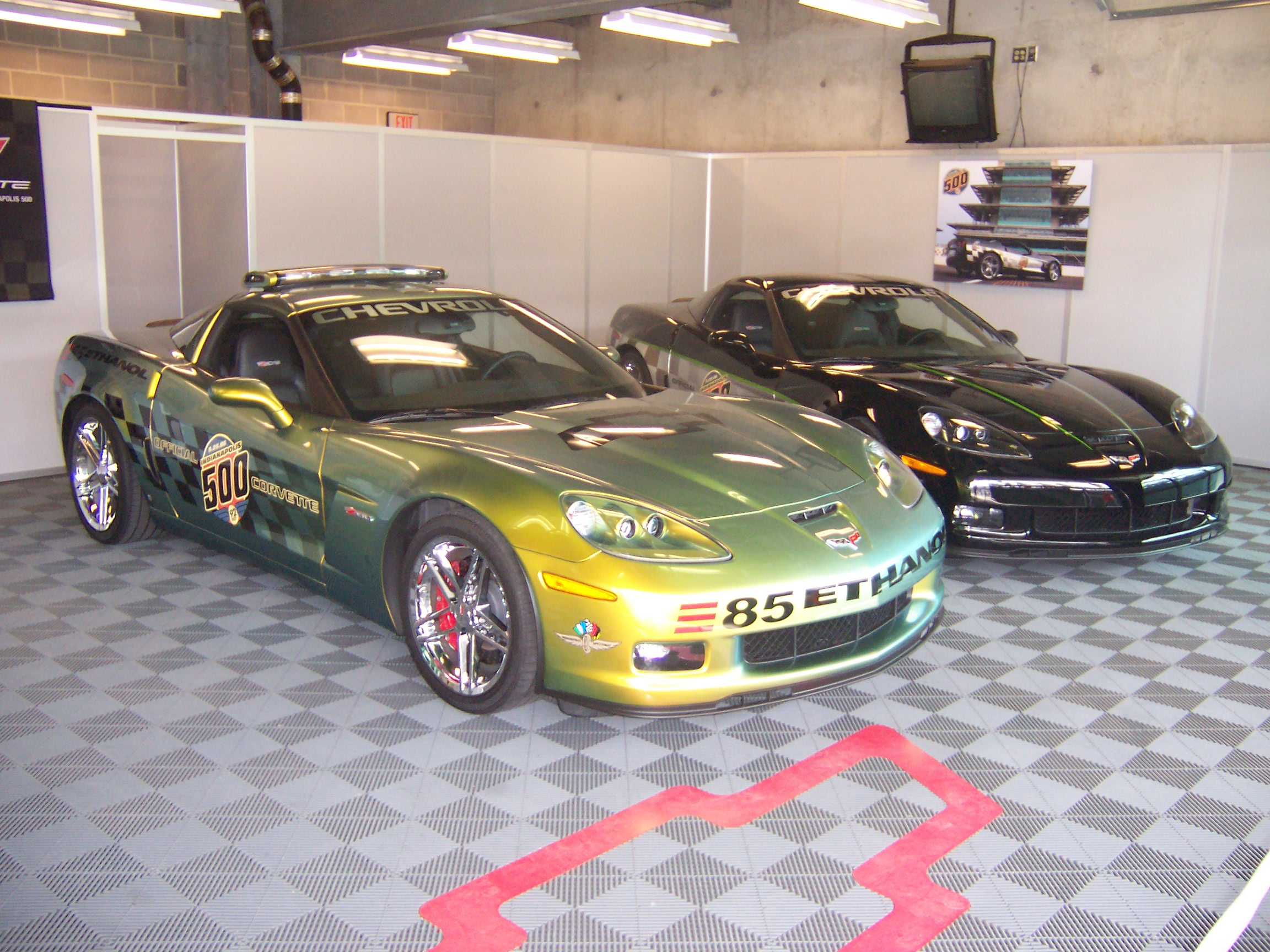
2008 Chevrolet Corvette pace cars

== See also ==
- List of Indianapolis 500 winners
- Indianapolis 500 year by year
- Indy Racing League
- 2008 IndyCar Series season

| 2007 Indianapolis 500; Dario Franchitti | 2008 Indianapolis 500; Scott Dixon | 2009 Indianapolis 500; Hélio Castroneves |

| Preceded by 2008 RoadRunner Turbo Indy 300 | IRL IndyCar Series round 5; 2008 | Succeeded by 2008 ABC Supply Company A.J. Foyt 225 |
