= Mishael Abbott =

American racing driver

- Nationality: (United States) American
- Born: June 21, 1981 (age 45) Jefferson City, Missouri, United States

Previous series
- 2007 2005–2006: IMSA Lites; Indy Pro Series

Mishael Abbott (born June 21, 1981, in Jefferson City, Missouri) is a female race car driver. In 2001, she began racing in Formula Mazda. In 2005, she drove in four Indy Pro Series races for Hemelgarn Johnson Motorsports with a best finish of eighth in her first race and thirteenth in points. In 2006, she made three starts for Michael Crawford Racing and despite finishing all three races, had a best finish of twelfth. Since 2007, she has competed in Sports Car Club of America C Sports Racer, Formula Mazda, and Formula Atlantic competition.

Abbott was the first female driver to compete in the Indy Pro Series under IRL ownership.

== Racing record ==
=== American open-wheel racing ===
(key) (Races in bold indicate pole position)

==== Indy Pro Series ====
Year	Team	1	2	3	4	5	6	7	8	9	10	11	12	13	14	Rank	Points
2005	Hemelgarn Racing	HMS; 8	PHX; 9	STP	INDY; 11	TXS	IMS; 12	NSH	MIL	KTY	PPIR	SNM	CHI	WGL	FON	**13th**	**83**
2006	Michael Crawford Motorsports	HMS; 13	STP1	STP2	INDY; 17	WGL; 12	IMS	NSH	MIL	KTY	SNM1	SNM2	CHI			**27th**	**48**
