= 2010 Firestone 550 =

(United States) 2010 Firestone 550
Race details
- 7th round of the 2010 IndyCar Series season
- Date: June 5, 2010
- Official name: Firestone 550
- Location: Texas Motor Speedway
- Course: Permanent racing facility 1.5 mi / 2.4 km
- Distance: 228 laps 342 mi / 550 km
- Weather: 93 °F (34 °C), clear skies

Pole position
- Driver: (Australia) Ryan Briscoe (Team Penske)
- Time: 1:37.3275 (4 laps)

Fastest lap
- Driver: (United States) Ryan Hunter-Reay (Andretti Autosport)
- Time: 24.2854 (on lap 116 of 228)

Podium
- First: (Australia) Ryan Briscoe (Team Penske)
- Second: (United States) Danica Patrick (Andretti Autosport)
- Third: (United States) Marco Andretti (Andretti Autosport)

The 2010 Firestone 550 was the twenty-first running of the Firestone 550 and the seventh round of the 2010 IndyCar Series season. It took place on Saturday, June 5, 2010. The race was contested over 228 laps at the 1.5-mile (2.4 km) Texas Motor Speedway in Fort Worth, Texas, and was telecasted by Versus in the United States.

The winner of the Firestone 550 was Ryan Briscoe, who was also the pole-sitter running a time of 1:37.3275. Danica Patrick who led 1 lap finished in second with Marco Andretti finishing in third for the second consecutive week.

== Classification ==
=== Qualifying ===
Pos	No.	Driver	Team	Lap 1	Lap 2	Lap 3	Lap 4	Total
1	6	(Australia) Ryan Briscoe	Team Penske	24.3034	24.3155	24.3486	24.3600	1:37.3275
2	10	(United Kingdom) Dario Franchitti	Chip Ganassi Racing	24.2917	24.3214	24.3597	24.3604	1:37.3332
3	12	(Australia) Will Power	Team Penske	24.3226	24.3375	24.3480	24.3716	1:37.3797
4	9	(New Zealand) Scott Dixon	Chip Ganassi Racing	24.3371	24.3274	24.3406	24.3771	1:37.3822
5	3	(Brazil) Hélio Castroneves	Team Penske	24.4442	24.3982	24.4249	24.4514	1:37.7187
6	19	(United Kingdom) Alex Lloyd (R)	Dale Coyne Racing	24.4313	24.4257	24.4337	24.4297	1:37.7204
7	06	(Japan) Hideki Mutoh	Newman/Haas Racing	24.4527	24.4287	24.4207	24.4311	1:37.7332
8	7	(United States) Danica Patrick	Andretti Autosport	24.4924	24.4581	24.4558	24.4556	1:37.8619
9	32	(Brazil) Mario Moraes	KV Racing Technology	24.5309	24.4968	24.4948	24.4757	1:37.9982
10	26	(United States) Marco Andretti	Andretti Autosport	24.5060	24.5040	24.4959	24.4993	1:38.0052
11	5	(Japan) Takuma Sato (R)	KV Racing Technology	24.5357	24.5175	24.4864	24.5080	1:38.0476
12	22	(United Kingdom) Justin Wilson	Dreyer & Reinbold Racing	24.5145	24.5125	24.5352	24.5267	1:38.0889
13	11	(Brazil) Tony Kanaan	Andretti Autosport	24.5469	24.5504	24.5518	24.5577	1:38.2068
14	8	(Venezuela) E. J. Viso	KV Racing Technology	24.5963	24.5572	24.5215	24.5362	1:38.2112
15	4	(United Kingdom) Dan Wheldon	Panther Racing	24.4960	24.5221	24.5896	24.6127	1:38.2204
16	67	(United States) Sarah Fisher	Sarah Fisher Racing	24.5480	24.5636	24.5655	24.5708	1:38.2479
17	18	(Venezuela) Milka Duno	Dale Coyne Racing	24.5684	24.5482	24.5762	24.5710	1:38.2638
18	24	(South Africa) Tomas Scheckter	Dreyer & Reinbold Racing	24.6096	24.5896	24.6091	24.6021	1:38.4104
19	14	(Brazil) Vítor Meira	A. J. Foyt Enterprises	24.6284	24.5868	24.6058	24.6353	1:38.4563
20	77	(Canada) Alex Tagliani	FAZZT Race Team	24.6377	24.6120	24.6393	24.6968	1:38.5858
21	66	(United Kingdom) Jay Howard (R)	Sarah Fisher Racing	24.6493	24.6384	24.6636	24.6704	1:38.6217
22	36	(Belgium) Bertrand Baguette (R)	Conquest Racing	24.6682	24.6524	24.6726	24.6744	1:38.6676
23	2	(Brazil) Raphael Matos	De Ferran Dragon Racing	24.6848	24.6737	24.6591	24.6605	1:38.6781
24	37	(United States) Ryan Hunter-Reay	Andretti Autosport	24.6688	24.6873	24.6660	24.6695	1:38.6916
25	34	(Brazil) Mario Romancini (R)	Conquest Racing	24.6728	24.6464	24.7202	24.7435	1:38.7829
26	78	(Switzerland) Simona de Silvestro (R)	HVM Racing	24.8188	24.7809	24.7848	24.7782	1:39.1627
OFFICIAL QUALIFICATIONS REPORT

=== Race ===
Pos	No.	Driver	Team	Laps	Time/Retired	Grid	Laps Led	Points
1	6	(Australia) Ryan Briscoe	Team Penske	228	2:04:47.1555	1	102	53
2	7	(United States) Danica Patrick	Andretti Autosport	228	+ 1.4628	8	1	40
3	26	(United States) Marco Andretti	Andretti Autosport	228	+ 2.3162	10	0	35
4	9	(New Zealand) Scott Dixon	Chip Ganassi Racing	228	+ 3.0770	4	0	32
5	10	(United Kingdom) Dario Franchitti	Chip Ganassi Racing	228	+ 7.5882	2	86	30
6	11	(Brazil) Tony Kanaan	Andretti Autosport	228	+ 8.0664	13	0	28
7	37	(United States) Ryan Hunter-Reay	Andretti Autosport	228	+ 13.9390	24	0	26
8	19	(United Kingdom) Alex Lloyd (R)	Dale Coyne Racing	228	+ 14.3084	6	0	24
9	4	(United Kingdom) Dan Wheldon	Panther Racing	228	+ 15.0859	15	1	22
10	14	(Brazil) Vítor Meira	A. J. Foyt Enterprises	228	+ 15.8250	19	0	20
11	8	(Venezuela) E. J. Viso	KV Racing Technology	228	+ 18.8687	14	0	19
12	06	(Japan) Hideki Mutoh	Newman/Haas Racing	228	+ 23.0449	7	1	18
13	24	(South Africa) Tomas Scheckter	Dreyer & Reinbold Racing	227	+ 1 Lap	18	0	17
14	12	(Australia) Will Power	Team Penske	227	+ 1 Lap	3	4	16
15	67	(United States) Sarah Fisher	Sarah Fisher Racing	227	+ 1 Lap	16	0	15
16	2	(Brazil) Raphael Matos	De Ferran Dragon Racing	226	+ 2 Laps	23	0	14
17	34	(Brazil) Mario Romancini (R)	Conquest Racing	226	+ 2 Laps	25	0	13
18	77	(Canada) Alex Tagliani	FAZZT Race Team	225	+ 3 Laps	20	33	12
19	22	(United Kingdom) Justin Wilson	Dreyer & Reinbold Racing	225	+ 3 Laps	12	0	12
20	3	(Brazil) Hélio Castroneves	Team Penske	129	Contact	5	0	12
21	32	(Brazil) Mario Moraes	KV Racing Technology	129	Contact	9	0	12
22	36	(Belgium) Bertrand Baguette (R)	Conquest Racing	129	Contact	22	0	12
23	18	(Venezuela) Milka Duno	Dale Coyne Racing	116	Mechanical	17	0	12
24	78	(Switzerland) Simona de Silvestro (R)	HVM Racing	97	Contact	26	0	12
25	5	(Japan) Takuma Sato (R)	KV Racing Technology	56	Contact	11	0	10
26	66	(United Kingdom) Jay Howard (R)	Sarah Fisher Racing	37	Mechanical	21	0	10
OFFICIAL RACE REPORT

== Championship standings after the race ==
Drivers' Championship standings

Pos	Driver	Points
1	(United Kingdom) Dario Franchitti	246
2	(Australia) Will Power	243
3	(New Zealand) Scott Dixon	235
4	(Brazil) Hélio Castroneves	211
5	(Australia) Ryan Briscoe	208

- Note: Only the top five positions are included.

Previous race: 2010 Indianapolis 500	IZOD IndyCar Series; 2010 season	Next race: 2010 Iowa Corn Indy 250
Previous race: 2009 Bombardier Learjet 550	2010 Firestone 550	Next race: 2011 Firestone Twin 275s
