= 2006 Indy Pro Series =

2006 Indy Pro Series season
- Indy Pro Series

Season
- Races: 12
- Start date: March 26
- End date: September 9

Awards
- Drivers' champion: (United Kingdom) Jay Howard

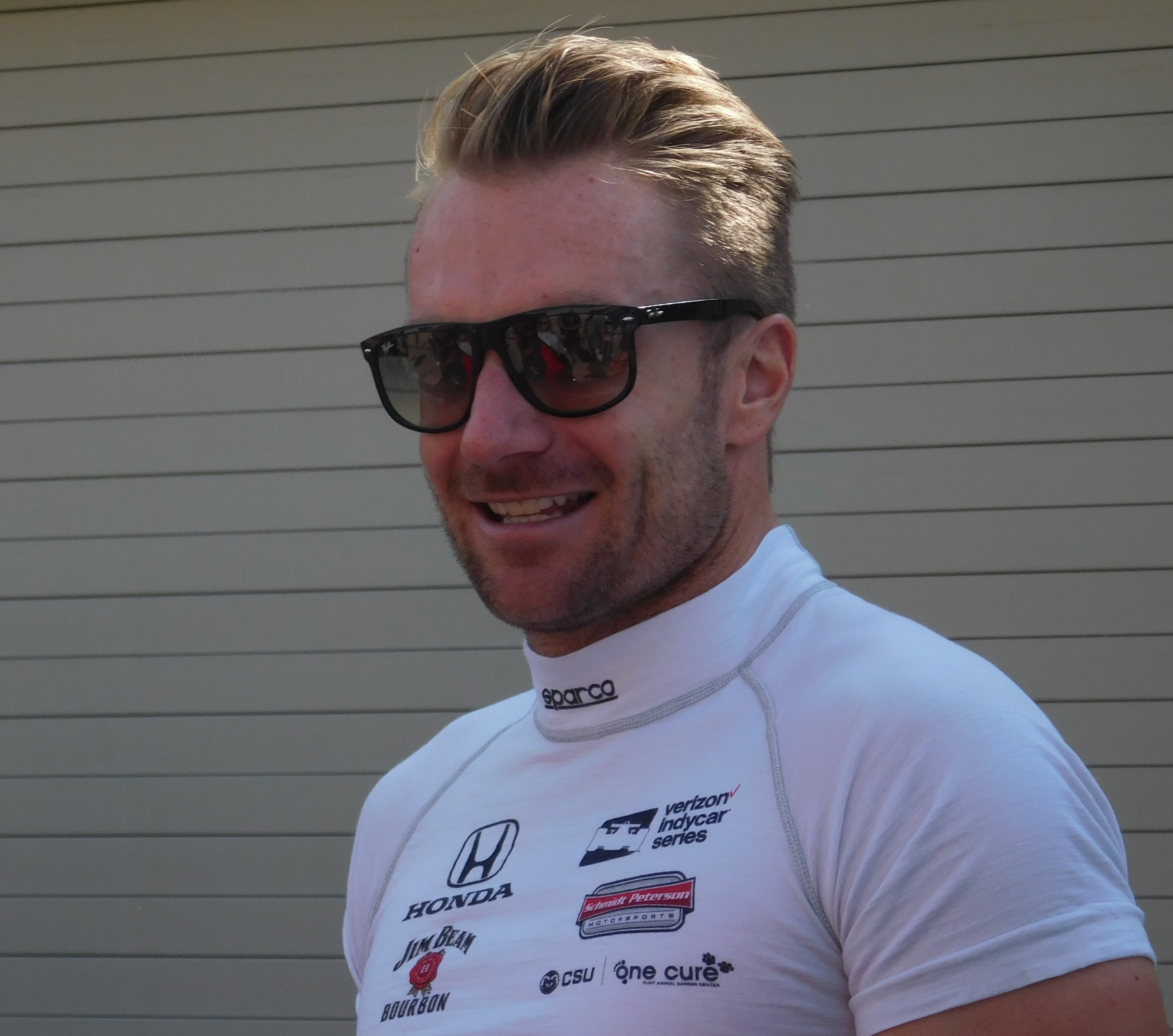
Jay Howard (pictured in 2017) won his first and only Indy Pro Series Drivers' Championship by four points over Jonathan Klein.

The 2006 Indy Pro Series was the 21st season of Indy Pro Series motor racing competition, the fifth season under Indy Racing League sanctioning, and the first season to be held under the "Indy Pro Series" moniker after Menards and Infiniti withdrew their title sponsorship of the series. The season featured twelve rounds between March 26 and September 9. The Drivers' Championship was won by rookie driver Jay Howard, his first and only championship in the Indy Pro Series.

English rookie Howard, driving for Sam Schmidt Motorsports narrowly won the championship by four points over American rookie Jonathan Klein of Andretti Green Racing, in a four-way battle for the title at the last round in Chicagoland Speedway that included the defending series champion Wade Cunningham and Bobby Wilson.

Following in the footsteps of Cunningham, Howard prevailed through sheer consistency rather than outright brilliance, with seven podium finishes and two wins at Nashville and Kentucky. All of his wins and pole positions came at oval events, which only comprised half of the schedule.

Klein didn't manage to win a race, and only led a handful of laps during the year, but six podium finishes over the last seven races kept him in contention until the end. Cunningham, driving for Brian Stewart Racing, was also in contention at the final round despite missing the doubleheader at St. Petersburg due to an appendix removal. Cunningham won three races, including the first of his three Freedom 100 victories, scored four pole positions and led the most laps in seven of the 10 races he contested, but couldn't overcome the 93-point deficit to Howard after St. Petersburg and fell 11 points short. Besides, his win over at Chicagoland over Klein allowed Howard to win the championship. An early crash took Bobby Wilson out of contention, finishing fourth in the standings with a win at Watkins Glen.

Seven different drivers won a race during the year, including Jeff Simmons, who left the series as the points leader after three races to drive in IndyCar, and rookie Alex Lloyd, with two road course wins at Indianapolis and Sonoma. Lloyd would miss three races due to funding issues, and finished seventh in points.

Two competitors from the Atlantic Championship made successful cameos during the year, with Brazilian rookie Raphael Matos sweeping the race weekend at St. Petersburg and Graham Rahal getting the pole position at the Liberty Challenge to finish second behind Lloyd, coming two laps short of winning in his only Indy Pro Series start.

Vision Racing disbanded their Indy Pro Series programme after one year, but the series was bolstered by an increase of price money and a host of new teams, led by the expansion of the Andretti Green Racing programme and the debut of Cheever Racing and Guthrie Racing.

Other teams that expanded to a full-time effort were Michael Crawford Racing, AFS Racing and Dave McMillan Racing, although the latter scaled back during the year. The series had 16 to 18 cars at most of his rounds, with 19 starters at the Freedom 100, but only 11 at Milwaukee and 14 at the Sonoma races. 41 different drivers competed during the year, tying the all-time record from 1996 at the time, but only six drivers started all twelve races, with three others missing two or less events. Former Indy 500 starters Jon Herb and Tyce Carlson competed at the Freedom 100.

== Drivers and teams ==
The following drivers and teams took part in the 2006 Indy Pro Series. All teams competed with Dallara IPS chassis, Tom Walkinshaw Racing-modified Infiniti engines, and Firestone tires.

Team	No.	Drivers	Rounds
Brian Stewart Racing	1	(New Zealand) Wade Cunningham	1, 4–12
Brian Stewart Racing	1	(United States) Geoff Dodge	2–3
Brian Stewart Racing	33	(United States) Geoff Dodge	1, 4, 7
Brian Stewart Racing	3	(Canada) Brett Van Blankers	1–9
Brian Stewart Racing	3	(New Zealand) Daniel Gaunt	10–11
Brian Stewart Racing	3	(Australia) Veronica McCann	12
Dave McMillan Racing	2	(New Zealand) Matthew Hamilton	1–5
Dave McMillan Racing	2	(United States) C. R. Crews	12
Dave McMillan Racing	22	(Canada) Éric Paradis	6
Roth Racing	4	(Canada) Marty Roth	1–3
Guthrie Racing	4	(United States) Phil Giebler	4
Guthrie Racing	4	(United States) Logan Gomez	6
Guthrie Racing	4	(United States) C. R. Crews	9
Guthrie Racing	4	(United States) Micky Gilbert	10–11
Guthrie Racing	4	(United States) Tom Wieringa	12
Guthrie Racing	4	(United States) Sean Guthrie	5
Guthrie Racing	41	(United States) Sean Guthrie	4, 7, 9, 12
Guthrie Racing	41	(United States) Travis Gregg	1
Guthrie Racing	41	(Brazil) Raphael Matos	2–3, 5–6
Guthrie Racing	41	(United Kingdom) Scott Mansell	10–11
Racing Professionals	6	(United States) Jon Herb	1–6
Sam Schmidt Motorsports	7	(United Kingdom) Jay Howard	All
Sam Schmidt Motorsports	38	(United States) Ryan Justice	10–11
Sam Schmidt Motorsports	77	(United States) Travis Gregg	9
Sam Schmidt Motorsports	77	(Japan) Akihira Okamoto	12
Michael Crawford Motorsports	8	(United States) Mishael Abbott	1, 4–5
Michael Crawford Motorsports	8	(United States) Rocco DeSimone	2–3
Michael Crawford Motorsports	8	(United States) C. R. Crews	6
Michael Crawford Motorsports	8	(United Kingdom) Scott Mansell	7
Michael Crawford Motorsports	8	(United States) P. J. Abbott	8, 10–11
Michael Crawford Motorsports	8	(United States) Ben Petter	9, 12
Michael Crawford Motorsports	9	(United States) Bobby Wilson	1–3
Michael Crawford Motorsports	9	(United States) Tom Wieringa	4
Michael Crawford Motorsports	9	(United States) C. R. Crews	5
Michael Crawford Motorsports	9	(United Kingdom) Scott Mansell	6
Michael Crawford Motorsports	9	(United States) Travis Gregg	7
Michael Crawford Motorsports	9	(United States) Michael Crawford	8
Michael Crawford Motorsports	9	(Japan) Shinji Kashima	9–12
Andretti Green Racing	11	(Brazil) Jaime Camara	All
Andretti Green Racing	27	(United States) Jonathan Klein	All
Kenn Hardley Racing	24	(United States) Jeff Simmons	1–3
Kenn Hardley Racing	24	(United States) Bobby Wilson	4–12
Kenn Hardley Racing	42	(Canada) Tom Wood	4, 7–9, 12
Kenn Hardley Racing	42	(United States) Phil Giebler	5
Kenn Hardley Racing	42	(United States) Graham Rahal	6
AFS Racing	25	(Netherlands) Arie Luyendyk Jr.	1–3, 5, 7, 12
AFS Racing	25	(United States) Tyce Carlson	4
AFS Racing	25	(United States) Phil Giebler	6
AFS Racing	26	(United Kingdom) Alex Lloyd	2–7, 9–12
AFS Racing	26	(Brazil) Thiago Medeiros	8
Cheever Racing	51	(United States) Chris Festa	1–7, 9, 12
Cheever Racing	51	(Brazil) Hoover Orsi	8
Cheever Racing	52	(United States) Nick Bussell	All
Part Sourcing International	76	(United States) James Chesson	4, 7
Part Sourcing International	76	(United States) Mike Potekhen	6, 9–12

=== Team drivers ===
Two teams entered Indy Pro Series competition in 2006.

== Schedule ==
The schedule downsized from 14 to 12 races, as the series moved to a 50-50 proportion on ovals and road courses in terms of races. Three ovals were dropped, as Phoenix, Pikes Peak and Fontana were removed after their IndyCar events were discontinued, along with Texas Motor Speedway. In turn, the races at St. Petersburg and Sonoma were turned into doubleheaders, the first of their kind in the combined history of Indy Lights. Homestead-Miami continued as the venue for the season opener, while Chicagoland inherited the season finale slot from California Speedway.

Rd.	Date	Race name	Track	Location
1	March 26	Miami 100	O Homestead–Miami Speedway	Homestead, Florida
2	April 1–2	Grand Prix of St. Petersburg	R Streets of St. Petersburg	St. Petersburg, Florida
3	April 1–2	Grand Prix of St. Petersburg	R Streets of St. Petersburg	St. Petersburg, Florida
4	May 26	Freedom 100	O Indianapolis Motor Speedway	Speedway, Indiana
5	June 4	Corning 100	R Watkins Glen International	Watkins Glen, New York
6	July 1	Liberty Challenge	R Indianapolis Motor Speedway road course	Speedway, Indiana
7	July 15	Sun Belt Rentals 100	O Nashville Superspeedway	Lebanon, Tennessee
8	July 22	Milwaukee 100	O Milwaukee Mile	West Allis, Wisconsin
9	August 13	Kentucky 100	O Kentucky Speedway	Sparta, Kentucky
10	August 26–27	Carneros 100	R Infineon Raceway	Sonoma, California
11	August 26–27	Valley of the Moon 100	R Infineon Raceway	Sonoma, California
12	September 9	Chicagoland 100	O Chicagoland Speedway	Joliet, Illinois

O Oval/Speedway
R Road/Street course

== Race results ==
Round	Race	Pole position	Fastest lap	Most laps led	Race Winner	
Round	Race	Pole position	Fastest lap	Most laps led	Driver	Team
1	Homestead–Miami Speedway	(United Kingdom) Jay Howard	(United States) Jon Herb	(United Kingdom) Jay Howard	(United States) Jeff Simmons	Kenn Hardley Racing
2	Streets of St. Petersburg	(Brazil) Raphael Matos	(Brazil) Raphael Matos	(Brazil) Raphael Matos	(Brazil) Raphael Matos	Guthrie Racing
3	Streets of St. Petersburg	(United States) Chris Festa (Note: In doubleheader weekends, no qualifying was held for Race 2. The grid was decided by the results of Race 1, with the top 6 finishers in reverse order, and no bonus point was awarded for pole position.)	(Brazil) Raphael Matos	(Brazil) Raphael Matos	(Brazil) Raphael Matos	Guthrie Racing
4	Indianapolis Motor Speedway	(New Zealand) Wade Cunningham	(United Kingdom) Jay Howard	(New Zealand) Wade Cunningham	(New Zealand) Wade Cunningham	Brian Stewart Racing
5	Watkins Glen International	(United States) Bobby Wilson	(United States) Bobby Wilson	(New Zealand) Wade Cunningham	(United States) Bobby Wilson	Kenn Hardley Racing
6	Indianapolis Motor Speedway Road Course	(United States) Graham Rahal	(United Kingdom) Alex Lloyd	(United States) Graham Rahal	(United Kingdom) Alex Lloyd	AFS Racing
7	Nashville Superspeedway	(New Zealand) Wade Cunningham	(New Zealand) Wade Cunningham	(New Zealand) Wade Cunningham	(United Kingdom) Jay Howard	Sam Schmidt Motorsports
8	Milwaukee Mile	(New Zealand) Wade Cunningham	(New Zealand) Wade Cunningham	(New Zealand) Wade Cunningham	(Brazil) Jaime Camara	Andretti Green Racing
9	Kentucky Speedway	(United States) Jonathan Klein	(United States) Bobby Wilson	(New Zealand) Wade Cunningham	(United Kingdom) Jay Howard	Sam Schmidt Motorsports
10	Infineon Raceway	(New Zealand) Wade Cunningham	(United Kingdom) Alex Lloyd	(New Zealand) Wade Cunningham	(New Zealand) Wade Cunningham	Brian Stewart Racing
11	Infineon Raceway	(United States) Mike Potekhen	(New Zealand) Wade Cunningham	(United Kingdom) Alex Lloyd	(United Kingdom) Alex Lloyd	AFS Racing
12	Chicagoland Speedway	(United Kingdom) Jay Howard	(Canada) Tom Wood	(New Zealand) Wade Cunningham	(New Zealand) Wade Cunningham	Brian Stewart Racing

== Championship standings ==
=== Drivers' Championship ===
Scoring system

Position	**1st**	**2nd**	**3rd**	**4th**	**5th**	**6th**	**7th**	**8th**	**9th**	**10th**	**11th**	**12th**	**13th**	**14th**	**15th**	**16th**	**17th**	**18th**	**19th**
Points	50	40	35	32	30	28	26	24	22	20	19	18	17	16	15	14	13	12	11

- The driver who starts on pole is awarded one point (except for Race 2 of doubleheader weekends)
- The driver who leads the most laps in a race is awarded two additional points.

Pos	Driver	HMS	STP		INDY	WGL	IMS	NAS	MIL	KTY	SNM		CHI	Points
1	(United Kingdom) Jay Howard RY	**3***	3	2	2	6	18	1	7	1	10	5	**3**	390
2	(United States) Jonathan Klein R	15	5	5	6	5	3	3	3	**2**	4	3	2	386
3	(New Zealand) Wade Cunningham	10			**1***	2*	16	**5***	**2***	3*	**1***	4	1*	379
4	(United States) Bobby Wilson R	5	8	6	7	**1**	9	7	4	7	5	2	17	343
5	(United States) Nick Bussell	2	4	10	10	15	5	6	5	6	3	13	8	319
6	(Brazil) Jaime Camara	11	12	15	3	4	13	2	1	14	7	14	16	298
7	(United Kingdom) Alex Lloyd R		10	3	5	17	1	DNS		16	2	1*	4	294
8	(United States) Chris Festa	16	6	**8^{i}**	4	14	15	9		8			5	205
9	(Canada) Brett Van Blankers R	8	9	11	14	7	17	10	8	15				179
10	(Brazil) Raphael Matos R		**1***	1*		13	4							154
11	(United States) Jon Herb	6	13	9	19	8	8							126
12	(United States) Jeff Simmons	1	2	4										122
13	(United States) Mike Potekhen R						11			10	6	**6^{i}**	7	121
14	(Canada) Tom Wood				9			4	9	12			9	116
15	(Netherlands) Arie Luyendyk Jr.	4	DNS			11		11					6	105
16	(New Zealand) Matthew Hamilton R	14	7	7	13	10								105
17	(United States) Geoff Dodge R	7	11	13	8			12						104
18	(United States) Sean Guthrie R				11	16		8		5			18	99
19	(United States) C. R. Crews R					9	6			11			13	86
20	(United Kingdom) Scott Mansell R						14	14			11	7		77
21	(United States) Phil Giebler				16	3	7							75
22	(Japan) Shinji Kashima R									13	12	11	12	72
23	(United States) Travis Gregg	12						13		4				67
24	(Canada) Marty Roth	9	14	12										56
25	(United States) P. J. Abbott								11		13	12		54
26	(United States) Ryan Justice R										8	8		48
26	(United States) Mishael Abbott	13			17	12								48
28	(United States) Graham Rahal R						**2***							43
29	(United States) Micky Gilbert R										9	10		42
29	(United States) Ben Petter R									9			10	42
31	(New Zealand) Daniel Gaunt R										14	9		38
32	(United States) Tom Wieringa				12								15	33
33	(United States) Rocco DeSimone R		15	14										31
34	(Brazil) Thiago Medeiros								6					28
35	(United States) Michael Crawford R								10					20
35	(United States) Logan Gomez R						10							20
37	(Australia) Veronica McCann R												11	19
37	(United States) James Chesson				18			DNS						19
39	(Canada) Éric Paradis R						12							18
40	(Japan) Akihira Okamoto R												14	16
41	(United States) Tyce Carlson				15									15
	(Brazil) Hoover Orsi										DNS	Wth		
Pos	Driver	HMS	STP		INDY	WGL	IMS	NAS	MIL	KTY	SNM		CHI	Points

Color	Result
Gold	Winner
Silver	2nd place
Bronze	3rd place
Green	4th & 5th place
Light Blue	6th–10th place
Dark Blue	Finished (Outside Top 10)
Purple	Did not finish
Red	Did not qualify (DNQ)
Brown	Withdrawn (Wth)
Black	Disqualified (DSQ)
White	Did not start (DNS)
Blank	Did not participate (DNP)
Blank	Not competing

**In-line notation**
**Bold**	Pole position (1 point)
Italics	Ran fastest race lap
*	Led most race laps (2 points)
^{i}	Partially-inverted field no bonus point awarded
Rookie of the Year
Rookie

- Ties in points broken by
  number of wins, or best
  finishes.
