= Mid-America Motorplex =

Coordinates: 41.025345°N 95.819111°W

Mid America Motorplex, now renamed Raceway Park of the Midlands (RPM), is an Alan Wilson-designed road circuit in the Omaha – Council Bluffs metropolitan area, in Plattville Township, Mills County, just outside Pacific Junction, Iowa. This facility includes a 2.23 mile road course and a 1/8-mile drag strip, known as I29 Dragway. It is a relatively safe track for people to learn to drive their cars at high-performance driving events. It is low-speed course (most cars under 300 bhp); maximum speeds are around 120 mph (190 km/h) with cornering speeds around 50 mph (80 km/h), with the exception of Turn 4 which is a fairly fast left-hander at around 80–100 mph.

There is a motorbike school at the track as well as most local car clubs such as the PCA-run driving education sessions and BMW Iowa Chapter driving schools.

Mid-America Motorplex has also served as a concert venue. It served as the venue for River Riot 2012, hosted by KIWR, which featured Incubus, Shinedown, Five Finger Death Punch, After the Fall and Emphatic. It also served as the venue for Knotfest on August 17, 2012, which featured Slipknot, Deftones, and Serj Tankian.
