= Ana Beatriz =

Brazilian racing driver (born 1985)

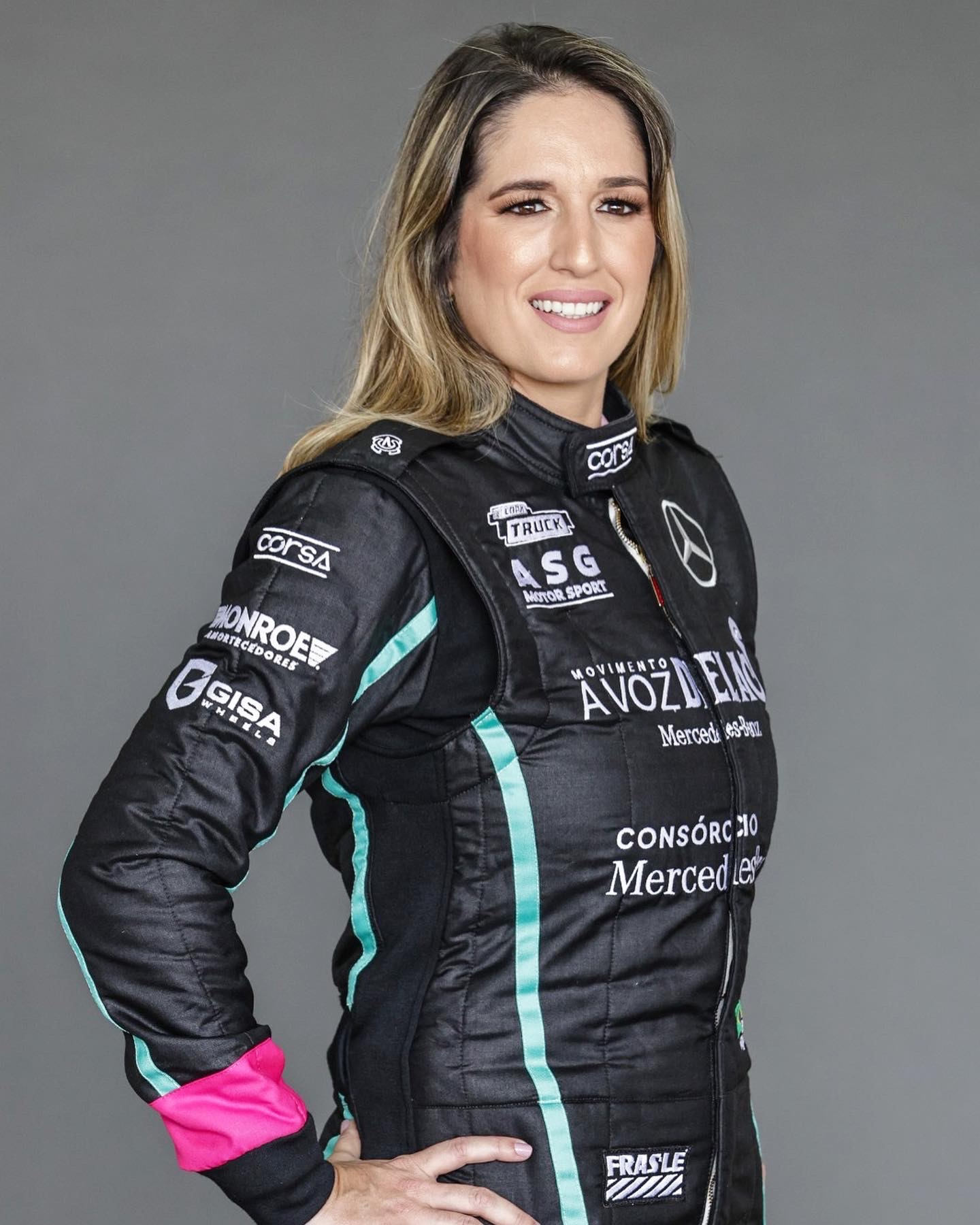
- Figueiredo in 2023
- Nationality: Brazilian
- Born: Ana Beatriz Caselato Gomes de Figueiredo; March 18, 1985 (age 41) São Paulo, Brazil
- Categorisation: FIA Gold (until 2018); FIA Silver (2019–)

IndyCar Series career
- 29 races run over 4 years
- 2013 position: 29th
- Best finish: 21st (2011)
- First race: 2010 São Paulo Indy 300 (São Paulo)
- Last race: 2013 Iowa Corn Indy 250 (Iowa)
Wins	Podiums	Poles
0	0	0
- Statistics up to date as of March 31, 2014.

Awards
- 2008 Firestone Indy Lights Rookie of the Year; 2003 Formula Renault 2.0 Brazil Rookie of the Year

Ana Beatriz Caselato Gomes de Figueiredo, known as both Ana Beatriz and Bia Figueiredo (born March 18, 1985), is a racing driver from Brazil. Figueiredo has previously raced in the IndyCar Series and Stock Car Brasil, and was the first woman to win a race in the Indy Lights series.

== Career ==
=== Early career ===
Figueiredo started her career in karting at the age of eight.

At the age of twelve, racing coach Nailor Campos – who had previously worked with Tony Kanaan, Rubens Barrichello, Enrique Bernoldi and Andre Ribeiro – became her coach and chief mechanic. When Figueiredo's family could no longer fund her racing endeavors at the age of 15, Campos helped her attain sponsorship from the Medley pharmaceutical company, owned by former racer Xandy (Pollini) Negrão, father of racer Alexandre Sarnes Negrão.

With formal sponsorship, Figueiredo finished as runner-up in a variety of karting championships and won the Sorriso Petrobrás Kart Cup championship in 2003.

After three seasons in the Brazilian Formula Renault championship, Figueiredo started competing in Formula Three Sudamericana in 2006, driving for the Cesario Formula team. In 2006, she also drove a Volkswagen Touareg for PPD Sports, owned by Pedro Diniz.

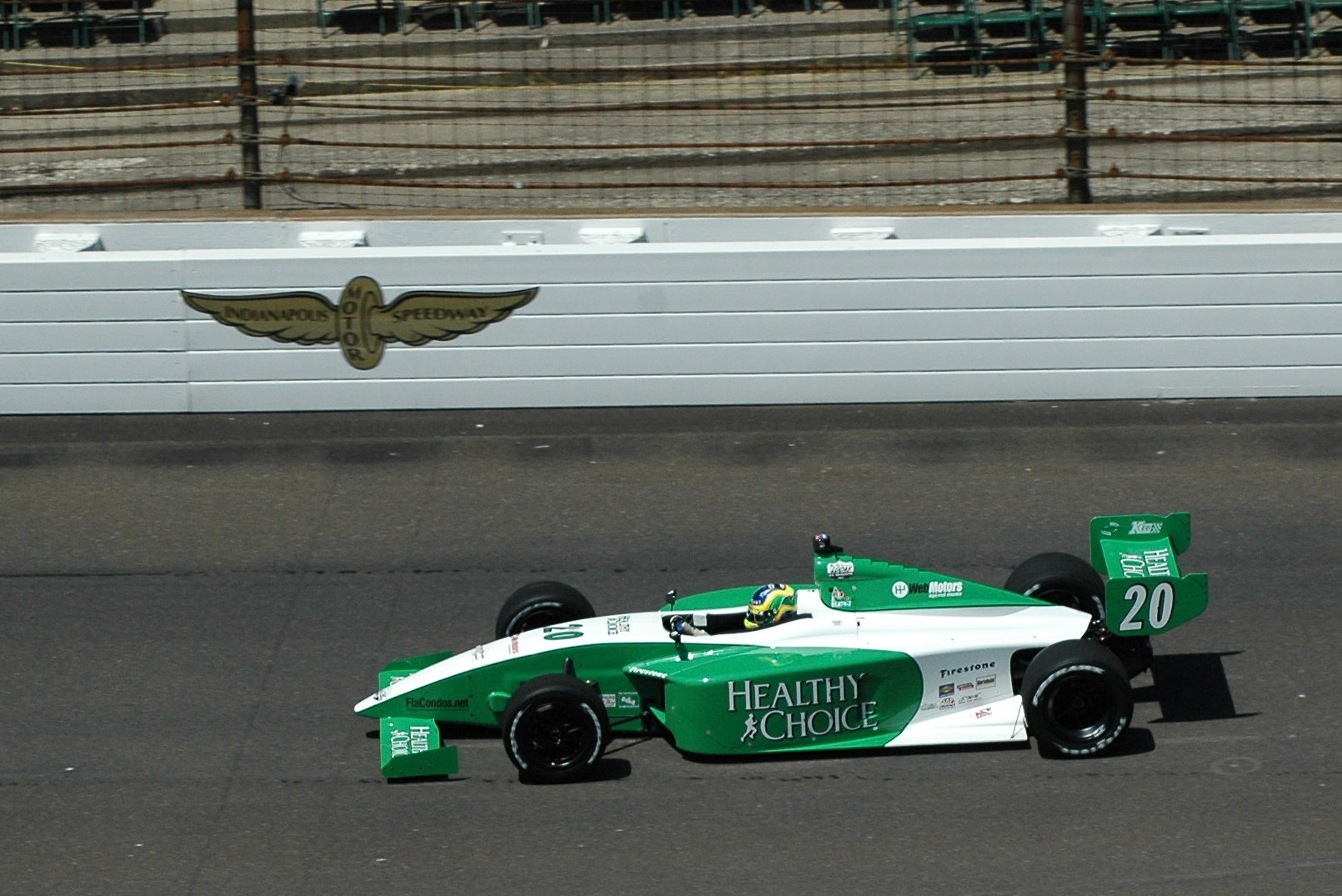
Ana driving in the Firestone Freedom 100 in 2008

=== Indy Lights ===
==== 2008 ====
In 2008, De Figueiredo began racing in the American Indy Lights Series for defending championship-winning team Sam Schmidt Motorsports under the name Ana Beatriz. Prior to racing in the United States, she was referred to as "Bia" (a nickname for Beatriz), not Ana, causing some confusion in the media.

De Figueiredo placed fifth in the Freedom 100 at Indianapolis Motor Speedway on 23 May 2008, the highest finishing position by a female driver in that race. On 12 July 2008, she led the most laps and won her first Indy Lights race at Nashville Superspeedway, becoming the first woman to win a race in Indy Lights.

"Everybody is making that comparison [with Danica Patrick]... But I always say that I'm always going to be Bia. I'm never going to be Danica... I hope there is a place for a Bia now."

— Beatriz after becoming the first woman to win a race in Indy Lights, July 2008.

De Figueiredo was awarded Rookie of the Year honors as well as the Tony Renna Rising Star Award.

==== 2009 ====
De Figueiredo returned to the No. 20 Sam Schmidt car for 2009. She was forced to miss the Milwaukee Mile race following a hard crash in the Freedom 100 the prior week. On 20 June 2009, De Figueiredo won her second Indy Lights race at Iowa Speedway. She skipped the final race of the season due to funding issues, finishing eighth in points despite missing the two races.

=== IndyCar ===
==== 2010 ====
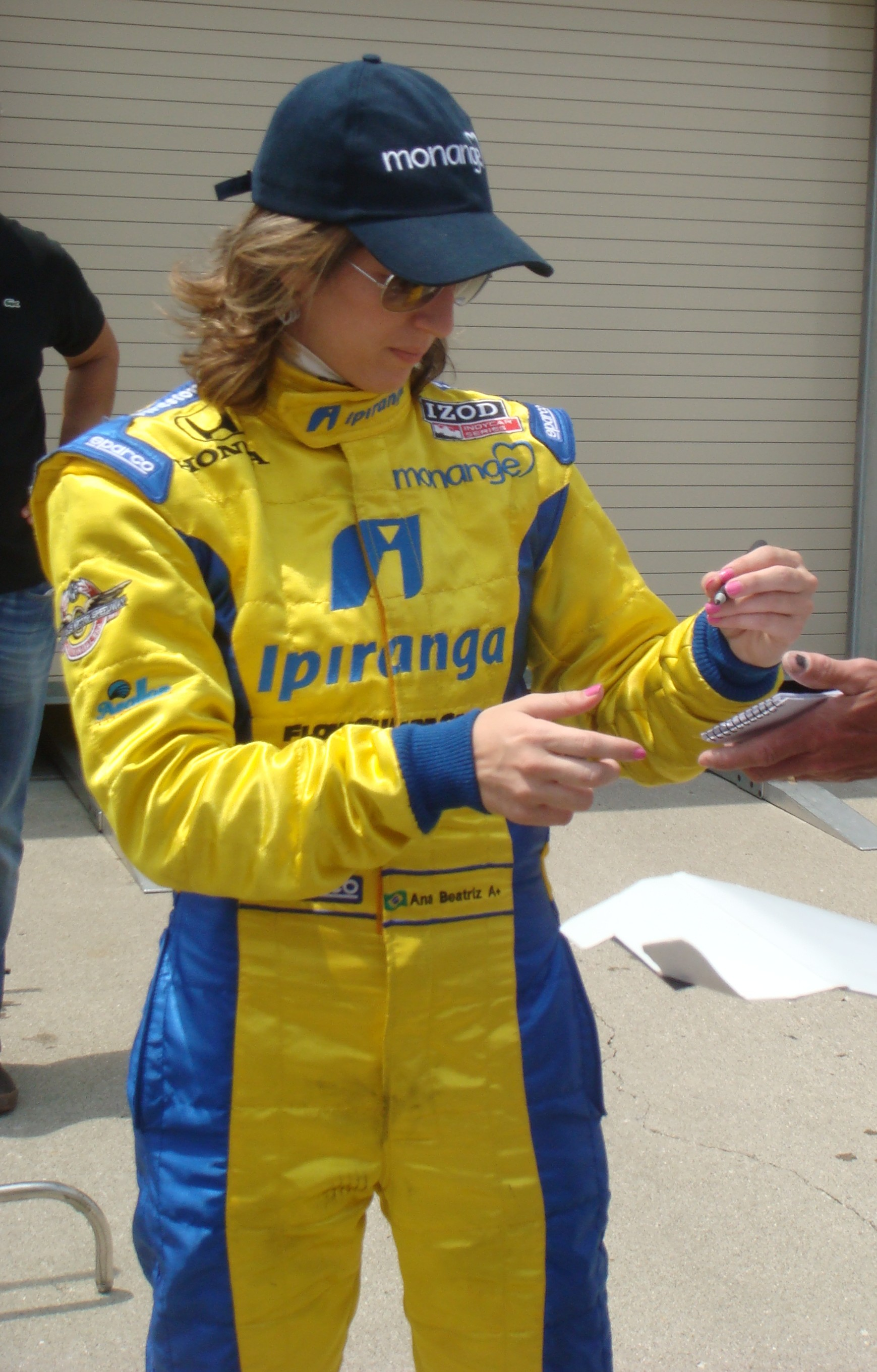
Bia at the Indianapolis Motor Speedway in May 2010.

De Figueiredo's official Portuguese language site revealed on 23 February 2010 that she would drive a third car for Dreyer & Reinbold Racing in the São Paulo Indy 300 in March 2010. Further participation in the 2010 IndyCar Series season was confirmed and announced on May 12, 2010. De Figueiredo qualified for the 2010 Indianapolis 500 but was involved in an accident with Ryan Hunter-Reay and teammate Mike Conway on the final lap of the race.

==== 2011 ====
For the 2011 IndyCar Series season, De Figueiredo competed full-time for Dreyer & Reinbold Racing in the No. 24 car. De Figueiredo broke her wrist in the opening laps of the first race at St. Petersburg, causing her to miss the next race and requiring her to compete with a brace for the large part of the season.

==== 2012 ====
On March 8, 2012, De Figueiredo tested for Andretti Autosport, driving James Hinchcliffe's car No. 27 during a session of the open test at Sebring, with an eye to her running that team's fourth car at April's IndyCar Series event in her home town of São Paulo. On April 5, it was announced that she would compete in the 2012 São Paulo and Indianapolis races for Andretti Autosport with assistance from Conquest Racing.

=== Stock Car Brasil ===
In 2014, De Figueiredo began competing in Stock Car Brasil. Competing in around 120 races, she scored two top-five race finishes and a best championship result of 24th in 2018 before taking maternal leave. De Figueiredo returned to racing full-time in 2023 via the Copa Truck series.

In June 2020, De Figuereido's husband and father-in-law were charged with embezzling BR$9 million from the Lagos Rio Health Institute, around a sixth of which was alleged to have funded her career in Stock Car Brasil.

== Motorsport results ==
=== Career summary ===
Season	Series	Position	Team	Car
2003	Formula Renault 2.0 Brazil	11th	Cesário Fórmula	Tatuus-Renault FR2000
2004	Formula Renault 2.0 Brazil	5th	Bassani Racing	Tatuus-Renault FR2000
2005	Formula Renault 2.0 Brazil	**3rd**	Cesário Fórmula	Tatuus-Renault FR2000
2006	Formula 3 Sudamericana	5th	Cesário Fórmula	Dallara-Berta F301
2008	Indy Lights	**3rd**	Sam Schmidt Motorsports	Dallara IP2
2009	Indy Lights	5th	Sam Schmidt Motorsports	Dallara IP2
2010	IndyCar Series	30th	Dreyer & Reinbold Racing	Dallara IR-05
2011	IndyCar Series	21st	Dreyer & Reinbold Racing	Dallara-Honda IR-05
2012	IndyCar Series	29th	Andretti Autosport	Dallara-Chevrolet DW12
2013	IndyCar Series	29th	Dale Coyne Racing	Dallara-Honda DW12
2014	Stock Car Brasil	32nd	ProGP	Chevrolet Sonic
2015	Stock Car Brasil	32nd	Bassani Racing	Peugeot 408
2016	Stock Car Brasil	26th	Bassani Racing	Peugeot 408
2017	Stock Car Brasil	29th	Full Time Sports	Chevrolet Cruze
2018	Stock Car Brasil	24th	A.Mattheis Motorsport	Chevrolet Cruze
2019	IMSA SportsCar Championship – GTD	16th	Meyer Shank Racing	Acura NSX GT3
2019	Stock Car Brasil	25th	A.Mattheis Motorsport	Chevrolet Cruze
2021	IMSA SportsCar Championship – GTD	51st	Earl Bamber Motorsport	Porsche 911 (991.2) GT3 R
2022	TCR South America Touring Car Championship	17th	Cobra Racing Team; Crown Racing	Audi RS 3 LMS TCR (2017); Honda Civic Type R TCR (FK8)
2023	Copa Truck	**3rd**	ASG Motorsport	Mercedes-Benz Actros
2024	Copa Truck	**1st**	ASG Motorsport	Mercedes-Benz Actros
2025	Copa Truck	*	ASG Motorsport	Mercedes-Benz Actros

=== American open–wheel results ===
(key)

==== Indy Lights ====
Year	Team	1	2	3	4	5	6	7	8	9	10	11	12	13	14	15	16	Rank	Points	Ref
2008	Sam Schmidt Motorsports	HMS; 7	STP1; 3	STP2; 16	KAN; 14	INDY; 5	MIL; 19	IOW; 3	WGL1; 4	WGL2; 3	NSH; 1	MOH1; 14	MOH2; 5	KTY; 16	SNM1; 6	SNM2; 3	CHI; 2	**3rd**	**449**	
2009	Sam Schmidt Motorsports	STP1; 4	STP2; 23	LBH; 5	KAN; 4	INDY; 17	MIL	IOW; 1	WGL; 9	TOR; 13	EDM; 12	KTY; 3	MOH; 12	SNM; 5	CHI; 14	HMS		**8th**	**320**	

==== IndyCar Series ====
Year	Team	No.	Chassis	Engine	1	2	3	4	5	6	7	8	9	10	11	12	13	14	15	16	17	18	19	Rank	Points	Ref
2010	Dreyer & Reinbold Racing	23	Dallara IR-05	Honda	SAO; 13	STP	ALA	LBH	KAN															30th	55	
2010	Dreyer & Reinbold Racing	25	Dallara IR-05	Honda						INDY; 21	TXS	IOW	WGL	TOR	EDM	MOH	SNM							30th	55	
2010	Dreyer & Reinbold Racing	24	Dallara IR-05	Honda														CHI; 24	KTY	MOT	HMS; 26			30th	55	
2011	Dreyer & Reinbold Racing	24	Dallara IR-05	Honda	STP; 14	ALA	LBH; 19	SAO; 24	INDY; 21	TXS1; 22	TXS2; 22	MIL; 17	IOW; 23	TOR; 11	EDM; 13	MOH; 17	NHM; 14	SNM; 13	BAL; 16	MOT; 19	KTY; 24	LVS; C		21st	212	
2012	Andretti Autosport	25	Dallara DW12	Chevrolet	STP	ALA	LBH	SAO; 20	INDY; 23	DET	TXS	MIL	IOW	TOR	EDM	MOH	SNM	BAL	FON					29th	28	
2013	Dale Coyne Racing	18	Dallara DW12	Honda	STP; 22	ALA; 24	LBH; 14	SAO; 25	INDY; 15	DET1	DET2	TXS	MIL; 19	IOW; 22	POC	TOR1	TOR2	MOH	SNM	BAL	HOU1	HOU2	FON	29th	72	

Years	Teams	Races	Poles	Wins	Podiums (Non-win)	Top 10s (Non-podium)	Indianapolis 500 Wins	Championships
4	3	29	0	0	0	0	0	0

==== Indianapolis 500 ====
Year	Chassis	Engine	Start	Finish	Team
2010	Dallara IR-05	Honda HI7R V8	21	21	Dreyer & Reinbold Racing
2011	Dallara IR-05	Honda HI7R V8	32	21	Dreyer & Reinbold Racing
2012	Dallara DW12	Chevrolet IndyCar V6t	13	23	Andretti Autosport/Conquest Racing
2013	Dallara DW12	Honda HI13TT V6t	29	15	Dale Coyne Racing

=== Complete Stock Car Brasil results ===
Year	Team	Car	1	2	3	4	5	6	7	8	9	10	11	12	13	14	15	16	17	18	19	20	21	22	Rank	Points
2014	ProGP	Chevrolet Sonic	INT; 1; 15	SCZ; 1; 22	SCZ; 2; 18	BRA; 1; 21	BRA; 2; 16	GOI; 1; 11	GOI; 2; 23	GOI; 1; 20	CAS; 1 Ret	CAS; 2 DNS	CUR; 1; 30	CUR; 2 DNS	VEL; 1; 18	VEL; 2; 15	SCZ; 1; 21	SCZ; 2; 17	TAR; 1; 27	TAR; 2; 14	SAL; 1; 21	SAL; 2; 19	CUR; 1 Ret		32nd	15
2015	União Química Bassani	Peugeot 408	GOI; 1; 19	RBP; 1; 20	RBP; 2 DNS	VEL; 1; 23	VEL; 2; 17	CUR; 1; 20	CUR; 2; 10	SCZ; 1; 24	SCZ; 2 DNS	CUR; 1 Ret	CUR; 2 DNS	GOI; 1 Ret	CAS; 1; 24	CAS; 2; 22	MOU; 1 Ret	MOU; 2 DNS	CUR; 1 Ret	CUR; 2 Ret	TAR; 1; 23	TAR; 2 Ret	INT; 1; 18		32nd	13
2016	União Química Bassani	Peugeot 408	CUR; 1 Ret	VEL; 1; 17	VEL; 2; 24	GOI; 1; 18	GOI; 2; 14	SCZ; 1; 23†	SCZ; 2 DNS	TAR; 1; 16	TAR; 2; 6	CAS; 1; 23	CAS; 2 Ret	INT; 1; 13	LON; 1; 21	LON; 2; 17	CUR; 1 Ret	CUR; 2; 19†	GOI; 1; 15	GOI; 2; 21†	CRI; 1; 19	CRI; 2; 11	INT; 1 Ret		26th	57
2017	Full Time Academy	Chevrolet Cruze	GOI; 1 Ret	GOI; 2 Ret	VEL; 1 Ret	VEL; 2 DNS	SCZ; 1 Ret	SCZ; 2; 6	CAS; 1 Ret	CAS; 2; 11	CUR; 1; 16	CRI; 1; 23	CRI; 2; 20	VCA; 1; 23	VCA; 2; 21	LON; 1; 28	LON; 2 Ret	ARG; 1 Ret	ARG; 2 DNS	TAR; 1 Ret	TAR; 2; 16	GOI; 1; 17	GOI; 2; 16	INT; 1; 24	29th	28
2018	Ipiranga Racing	Chevrolet Cruze	INT; 1 Ret	CUR; 1 Ret	CUR; 2 Ret	VEL; 1; 22	VEL; 2; 16	LON; 1 Ret	LON; 2; 14	SCZ; 1; 21	SCZ; 2 Ret	GOI; 1; 10	MOU; 1; 17	MOU; 2; 5	CAS; 1 Ret	CAS; 2 Ret	VCA; 1; 17	VCA; 2 Ret	TAR; 1; 16	TAR; 2; 11	GOI; 1 Ret	GOI; 2; 15	INT; 1; 17		24th	21
2019	Ipiranga Racing	Chevrolet Cruze	VEL; 1; 19	VCA; 1; 22	VCA; 2; 16	GOI; 1 Ret	GOI; 2; 22	LON; 1 Ret	LON; 2; 4	SCZ; 1; 23	SCZ; 2 Ret	MOU; 1; 13	MOU; 2; 21	INT; 1 Ret	VEL; 1; 19	VEL; 2; 20	CAS; 1; 15	CAS; 2; 10	VCA; 1; 15	VCA; 2; 18	GOI; 1 Ret	GOI; 2; 19	INT; 1; 16		25th	73

^{†} Driver did not finish the race, but was classified as she completed over 90% of the race distance.

=== Complete IMSA WeatherTech SportsCar Championship results ===
(key) (Races in bold indicate pole position) (Races in italics indicate fastest lap)

Year	Entrant	Class	Make	Engine	1	2	3	4	5	6	7	8	9	10	11	12	Rank	Points
2019	Heinricher Racing w/ Meyer Shank Racing	GTD	Acura NSX GT3	Acura 3.5 L Turbo V6	DAY; 12	SEB; 8	MOH	DET	WGL; 4	MOS; 6	LIM	ELK; 13	VIR	LGA	PET; 7		16th	137
2021	Team Hardpoint EBM	GTD	Porsche 911 GT3 R	Porsche 4.0 L Flat-6	DAY	SEB; 5	MOH	DET	WGL	WGL	LIM	ELK	LGA	LBH	VIR	PET	51st	280

=== Complete Copa Truck results ===
Year	Team	Class	Constructor	1	2	3	4	5	6	7	8	9	10	11	12	13	14	15	16	17	18	Rank	Points
2023	ASG Motorsport	S	Mercedes-Benz Actros	GN1; 3	GN2; 4	SP1; Ret	SP2; 6	LO1; Ret	LO2; NL	PR1; 5	PR2; 4	CA1; 4	CA2; 1	GO1; 10	GO2; 4	RS1; 2	RS2; 6	TR1; 2	TR2; 5	IT1; 3	IT2; 4	3rd	215
2024	ASG Motorsport	S	Mercedes-Benz Actros	CG1; 12	CG2; 9	GO1; 1	GO2; Ret	LO1; 1	LO2; 3	PT1; 1	PT2; 3	IT1; 1	IT2; 3	CA1; 1	CA2; 6	TR1; 1	TR2; 4	MG1; 2	MG2; 1	GN1; DSQ	GN2; DSQ	1st	280
