= Sebastián Saavedra =

Colombian racing driver (born 1990)

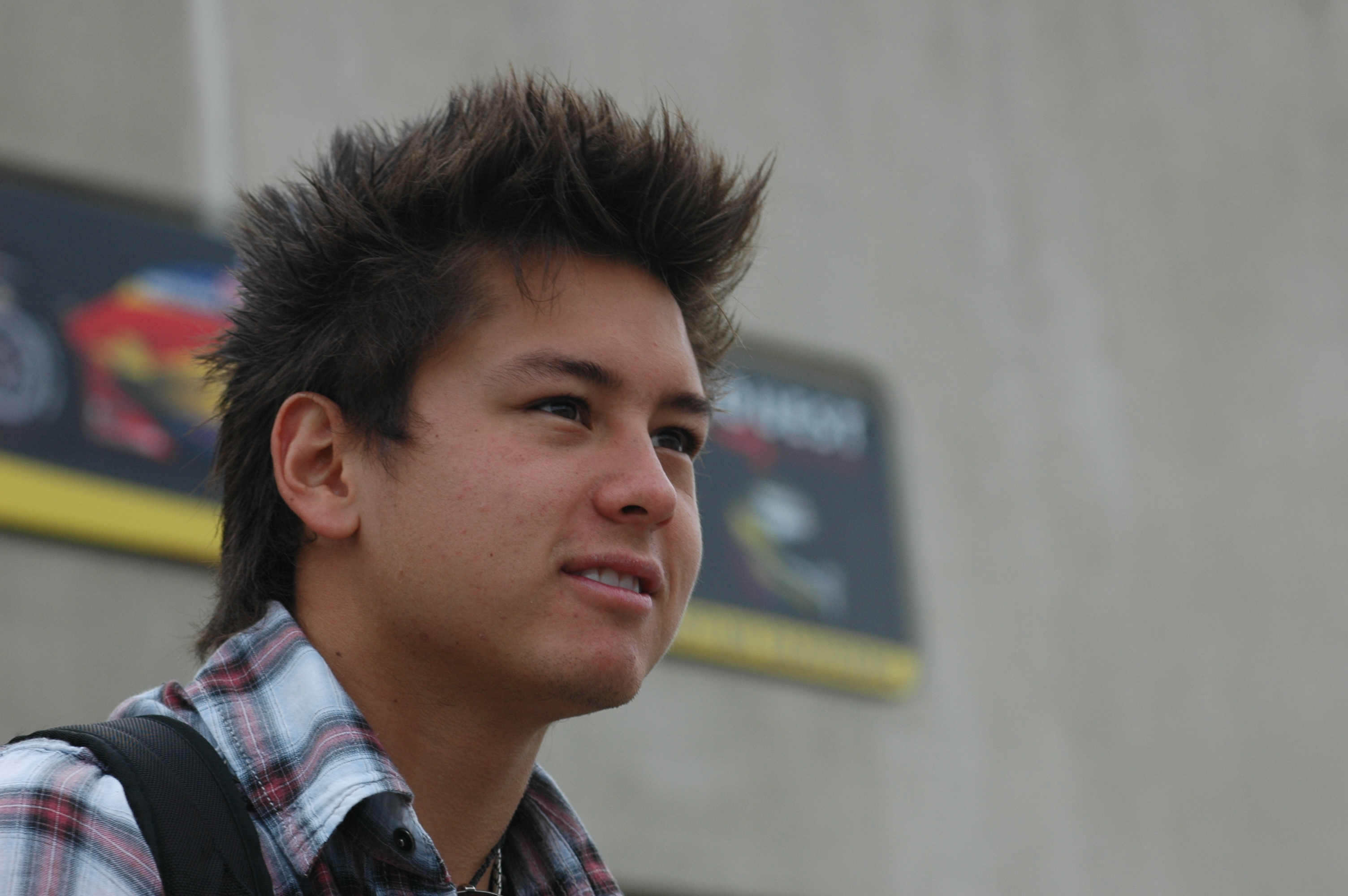
- Saavedra at the 2011 Indianapolis 500
- Nationality: (Colombia) Colombian
- Born: 2 June 1990 (age 36) Bogotá, Colombia
- Categorisation: FIA Gold

IndyCar Series career
- 63 races run over 7 years
- Team: No. 17 (Juncos Racing)
- Best finish: 21st (2013, 2014)
- First race: 2010 Indianapolis 500 (Indianapolis)
- Last race: 2017 Honda Indy Toronto (Toronto)
Wins	Podiums	Poles
0	0	1

Previous series
- 2009–10, 2012 2008 2008 2007 2006–2007 2006–07: Indy Lights; ATS Formel 3 Cup; Austria Formula 3 Cup; Formula BMW Pacific; Formula BMW USA; Formula BMW ADAC

Awards
- 2009: Indy Lights Rookie of the Year

Sebastián Saavedra (born 2 June 1990) is a Colombian racing driver from Bogotá. In 2014, he drove for KVSH Racing in the Verizon IndyCar Series before being replaced by former GP2 Series driver Stefano Coletti.

== Racing career ==
=== Early career ===
After a childhood in karting, Saavedra drove in Formula BMW USA for Gelles Racing, finishing eleventh in points. He also drove in two races in Formula BMW ADAC and competed in the Formula BMW World Final, finishing 32nd. He was involved in an incident with Sergio Pérez where Saavedra's car ended up on top of Pérez's in round 6 of 2006 Formula BMW ADAC. Both drivers were black flagged and Saavedra was dropped by his team, Eifelland Racing. In 2007, he switched teams in Formula BMW USA to Eurointernational and captured one win and finished twelfth in points despite only competing in eight of fourteen races. He also competed in six Formula BMW Asia races capturing three wins, two races in Formula BMW ADAC, and finished fourth in the Formula BMW World Final. In 2008 he moved to ATS Formel 3 Cup and finished second in points with three wins for HS Technik Motorsport. He also competed in a number of Austria Formula 3 Cup races and finished ninth in points.

=== Indy Lights and 2010 Indy 500 ===
In 2009, Saavedra signed to drive in the American Firestone Indy Lights Series in 2009 for defending championship team AGR-AFS Racing alongside teammate J. R. Hildebrand. He captured his first Indy Lights win in the fourth race of the season and the first on an oval, at Kansas Speedway in April. In July, he won from the pole on the streets of Toronto.

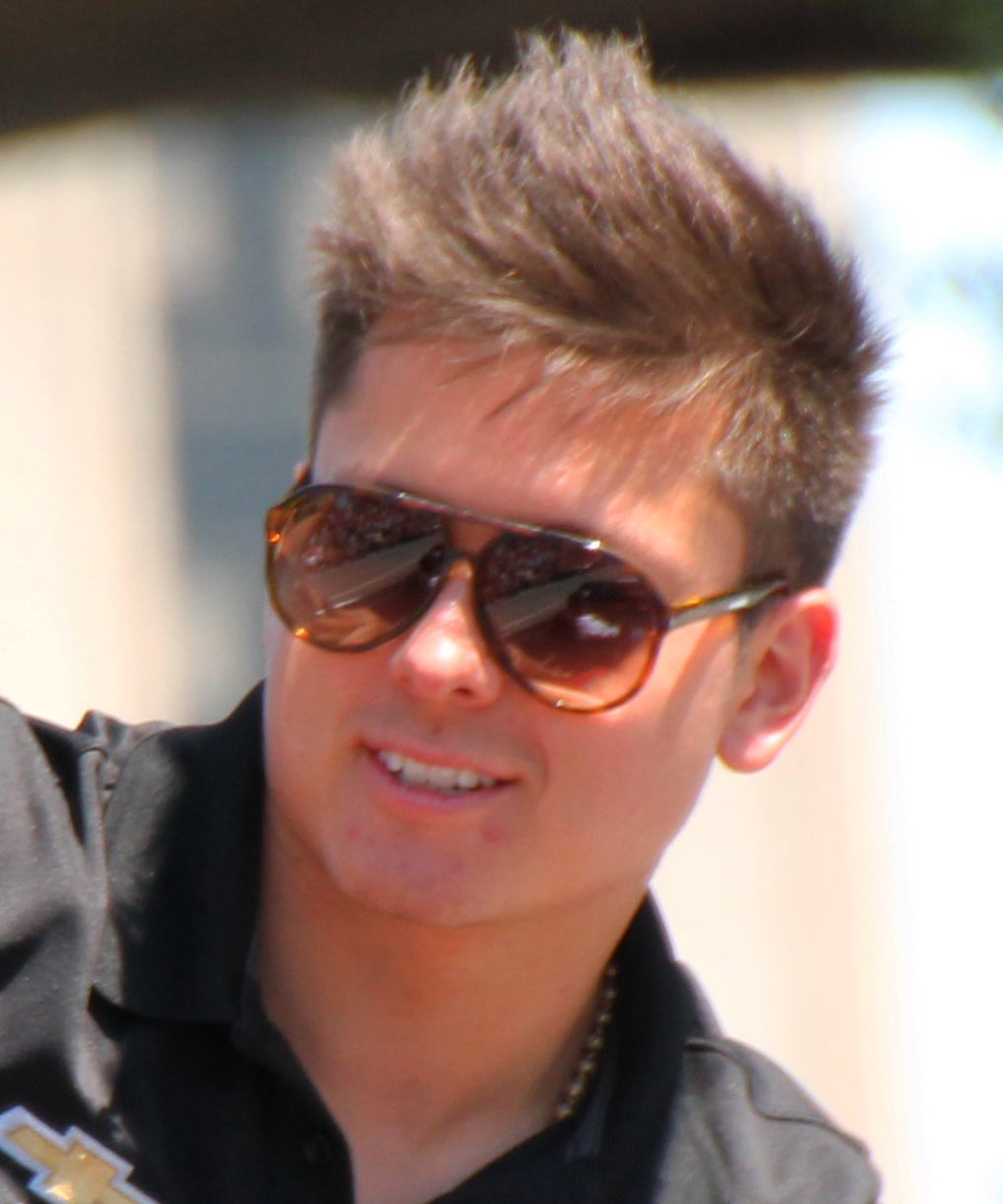
Saavedra at the 2015 Indianapolis 500

Saavedra returned to the series in 2010 for Bryan Herta Autosport and made his IndyCar Series debut in the 2010 Indianapolis 500 driving for the same team. Saavedra was on the bubble during most of qualifying during bump day, and crashed during practice laps while waiting for other drivers to attempt to qualify. While he was in the hospital being checked out, and with no working car to attempt to re-qualify, Saavedra appeared out of the race when Tony Kanaan bettered his time knocking him out of the field. However, when both Paul Tracy and Jay Howard withdrew their successful qualifying times and failed to re-qualify (both felt they would be knocked out by other drivers if they did not improve), Saavedra improbably ended up back in position thirty-three and in the race when time ran out for attempts. Saavedra crashed out in a single car accident on lap 159 and was credited with 23rd place in the race. The following month, Saavedra captured Bryan Herta Autosport's second Indy Lights win in the AvoidTheStork.com 100 at Iowa Speedway.

On 4 September 2010, Saavedra officially terminated his contract with Bryan Herta Autosport due to the team's inability to meet contract standards after a string of car failures and negative results.

=== IndyCar Series ===
Saavedra competed in the IndyCar Series season finale at Homestead Miami Speedway for Conquest Racing. He signed on to return to Conquest for the full 2011 IndyCar Series season in the team's No. 34 car. Driving for the single-car Conquest team, Saavedra's best finish was eleventh in the 2011 São Paulo Indy 300. Saavedra failed to qualify for the 2011 Indianapolis 500 while his one-off teammate Pippa Mann qualified for the race. He was replaced in the Conquest car by João Paulo de Oliveira for the Motegi race and Dillon Battistini at the Kentucky Speedway, but returned to the car for the season finale in Las Vegas, which was cancelled after Dan Wheldon's fatal crash. Saavedra finished 25th in the final championship standings.

For 2012, Saavedra returned to AFS Racing/Andretti Autosport to race a full season in Indy Lights and also drove in the IndyCar Series in the 2012 Indianapolis 500 as well as the series' races at Sonoma Raceway and Auto Club Speedway.

For 2014, Saavedra signed with KV Racing Technology, racing under the KV/AFS banner. In the inaugural Grand Prix of Indianapolis, Saavedra qualified on pole with a time of 01:23.8822. He stalled at the start and was struck by the cars of Carlos Muñoz and Mikhail Aleshin while still stationary. His best result throughout the year was 9th in Long Beach.

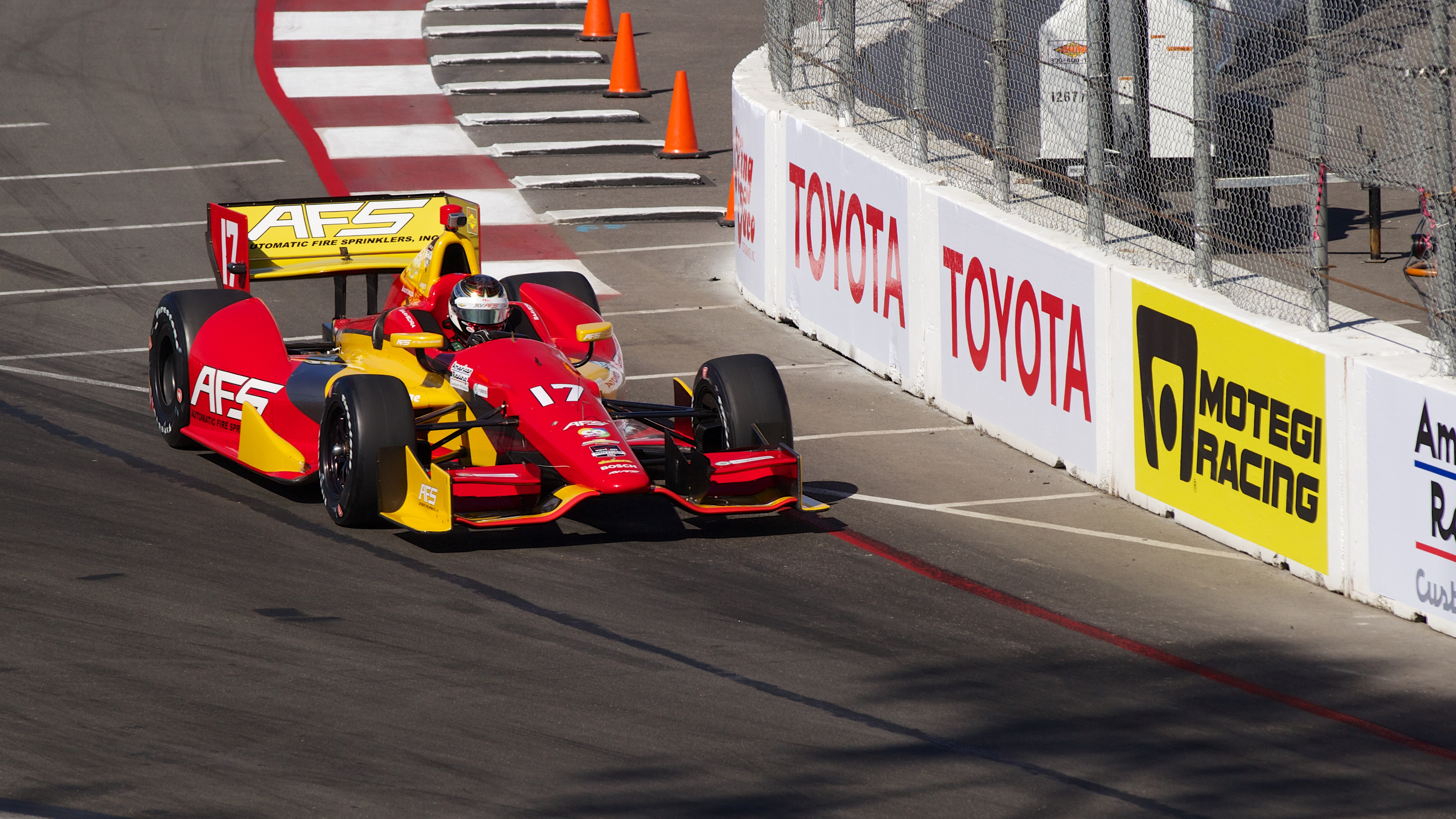
Saavedra driving at the Grand Prix of Long Beach

In 2015, Saavedra joined Chip Ganassi Racing split time in the No. 8 with Sage Karam. Saavedra ran the Indy 500 in a fifth car entered by Ganassi with the No. 17. During the race, Saavedra collided with Jack Hawksworth and hit the turn four wall. After bouncing off, his car was hit just in front of the driver's cockpit by Stefano Coletti. Saavedra was unable to leave the accident under his own power; Saavedra's boot had to be cut off to remove him from the car, after which he was carried by the safety team into an ambulance. Saavedra participated in two more races during the season before being released by Ganassi at season end.

For 2017, Saavedra was signed to drive the Indianapolis 500 for the new Juncos Racing team in the No. 17 car. He placed fifteenth, matching his career best finish in the 500. Later in the season, Saavedra was signed to drive at Toronto in the No. 7 car for Schmidt Peterson Motorsports, replacing Mikhail Aleshin for the race weekend.

=== IMSA career ===
In 2019, Saavedra participated on International Motor Sports Association (IMSA) 24 Hours of Daytona race, winning the LMP2 class in the No. 18 DragonSpeed Oreca 07, piloted by Pastor Maldonado, Roberto Gonzalez, Ryan Cullen and himself, overcoming an engine problem which nearly jeopardized his race.

== Racing record ==
=== American open–wheel racing results ===
(key)

==== Indy Lights ====
Year	Team	1	2	3	4	5	6	7	8	9	10	11	12	13	14	15	Rank	Points	Ref
2009	AGR-AFS Racing	STP1; 26	STP2; 2	LBH; 8	KAN; 1	INDY; 5	MIL; 3	IOW; 15	WGL; 18	TOR; 1	EDM; 3	KTY; 2	MOH; 18	SNM; 7	CHI; 6	HMS; 3	3rd	446	
2010	Bryan Herta Autosport	STP; 12	ALA; 3	LBH; 4	INDY; 9	IOW; 1	WGL; 3	TOR; 14	EDM; 6	MOH; 5	SNM; 15	CHI; 11	KTY	HMS			8th	303	
2012	AFS Racing Andretti Autosport	STP; 3	ALA; 1	LBH; 2	INDY; 5	DET; 6	MIL; 2	IOW; 13	TOR; 2	EDM; 2	TRO; 9	BAL; 10	FON; 14				4th	383	

==== IndyCar Series ====
Year	Team	No.	Chassis	Engine	1	2	3	4	5	6	7	8	9	10	11	12	13	14	15	16	17	18	19	Rank	Points	Ref
2010	Bryan Herta Autosport	29	Dallara IR-05	Honda	SAO	STP	ALA	LBH	KAN	INDY; 23	TXS	IOW	WGL	TOR	EDM	MOH	SNM	CHI	KTY	MOT				33rd	29	
2010	Conquest Racing	36	Dallara IR-05	Honda																	HMS; 16			33rd	29	
2011	Conquest Racing	34	Dallara IR-05	Honda	STP; 13	ALA; 26	LBH; 14	SAO; 11	INDY; DNQ	TXS; 28	TXS; 29	MIL; 23	IOW; 20	TOR; 25	EDM; 16	MOH; 27	NHM; 15	SNM; 14	BAL; 13	MOT	KTY	LVS^{1} C		25th	178	
2012	Andretti Autosport	17	Dallara DW12	Chevrolet	STP	ALA	LBH	SAO	INDY; 26	DET	TXS	MIL	IOW	TOR	EDM	MOH	SNM; 15	BAL	FON; 21					27th	41	
2013	Dragon Racing	6	Dallara DW12	Chevrolet	STP; 20	ALA; 20	LBH; 27	SAO; 19	INDY; 32	DET; 22	DET; 10	TXS; 14	MIL; 13	IOW; 19	POC; 23	TOR; 16	TOR; 15	MOH; 19	SNM; 21	BAL; 8	HOU; 14	HOU; 12	FON; 24	21st	236	
2014	KV Racing Technology	17	Dallara DW12	Chevrolet	STP; 11	LBH; 9	ALA; 18	IMS; 23	INDY; 15	DET; 14	DET; 22	TXS; 17	HOU; 15	HOU; 17	POC; 15	IOW; 17	TOR; 19	TOR; 21	MOH; 20	MIL; 18	SNM; 16	FON; 17		21st	291	
2015	Chip Ganassi Racing	8	Dallara DW12	Chevrolet	STP	NLA	LBH; 10	ALA	IMS; 17		DET	DET	TXS	TOR; 16	FON	MIL	IOW	MOH	POC	SNM; 13				25th	95	
2015	Chip Ganassi Racing	17	Dallara DW12	Chevrolet						INDY; 23														25th	95	
2017	Juncos Racing	17	Dallara DW12	Chevrolet	STP	LBH	ALA	PHX	IMS	INDY; 15	DET	DET	TXS	ROA	IOW									26th	80	
2017	Schmidt Peterson Motorsports	7	Dallara DW12	Honda												TOR; 11	MOH	POC; 21	GTW; 11	WGL	SNM			26th	80	

^{1} The Las Vegas Indy 300 was abandoned after Dan Wheldon died from injuries sustained in a 15-car crash on lap 11.

Years	Teams	Races	Poles	Wins	Podiums (Non-win)	Top 10s (Non-podium)	Indianapolis 500 Wins	Championships
7	8	63	1	0	0	4	0	0

==== Indianapolis 500 ====
Year	Chassis	Engine	Start	Finish	Team
2010	Dallara	Honda	32	23	Bryan Herta Autosport
2011	Dallara	Honda	DNQ		Conquest Racing
2012	Dallara	Chevrolet	24	26	Andretti Autosport/AFS Racing
2013	Dallara	Chevrolet	27	32	Dragon Racing
2014	Dallara	Chevrolet	32	15	KV Racing Technology
2015	Dallara	Chevrolet	28	23	Chip Ganassi Racing
2017	Dallara	Chevrolet	31	15	Juncos Racing

=== Complete WeatherTech SportsCar Championship ===
Year	Entrant	Class	Chassis	Engine	1	2	3	4	5	6	7	8	9	10	11	Rank	Points	Ref
2014	Starworks Motorsport	P	Riley Mk XXVI DP	Dinan (BMW) 5.0 L V8	DAY; 17											54th	16	
2014	Starworks Motorsport	P	Riley Mk XXVI DP	Honda HR35TT 3.5 L V6 Turbo		SEB; 17	LBH	LGA	DET	WGL	MOS	IMS	ELK	COA	PET	54th	16	
2018	AFS/PR1 Mathiasen Motorsports	P	Ligier JS P217	Gibson GK428 4.2 L V8	DAY; 12	SEB; 11	LBH; 11	MOH; 6	DET; 8	WGL; 9	MOS; 9	ELK; 13				13th	211	
2018	AFS/PR1 Mathiasen Motorsports	P	Oreca 07	Gibson GK428 4.2 L V8									LGA; 8	PET; 12		13th	211	
2019	DragonSpeed	LMP2	Oreca 07	Gibson GK428 4.2 L V8	DAY; 1	SEB	MOH	WGL	MOS	ELK	LGA	PET				8th	35	

=== Complete Global RallyCross Championship results ===
==== Supercar ====
Year	Entrant	Car	1	2	3	4	5	6	7	8	9	10	11	12	GRC	Points
2016	AD Racing	Ford Fiesta ST	PHO1; 11	PHO2; 11	DAL; DNS	DAY1; WD	DAY2; WD	MCAS1	MCAS2; C	DC	AC	SEA	LA1	LA2	20th	3
