= 2011 Honda Grand Prix of St. Petersburg =

American IndyCar racing competition

(United States) 2011 St. Petersburg
Race details
- 1st round of the 2011 IndyCar Series season
- Date: March 27, 2011
- Official name: Honda Grand Prix of St. Petersburg
- Location: Streets of St. Petersburg
- Course: Temporary street circuit 1.800 mi / 2.897 km
- Distance: 100 laps 180.000 mi / 289.682 km
- Weather: 85 °F (29 °C), scattered clouds

Pole position
- Driver: (Australia) Will Power (Team Penske)
- Time: 1:01.9625

Fastest lap
- Driver: (Brazil) Hélio Castroneves (Team Penske)
- Time: 1:03.8683 (on lap 74 of 100)

Podium
- First: (United Kingdom) Dario Franchitti (Chip Ganassi Racing)
- Second: (Australia) Will Power (Team Penske)
- Third: (Brazil) Tony Kanaan (KV Racing Technology – Lotus)

Chronology
Previous	Next
2010	2012

The 2011 Honda Grand Prix of St. Petersburg was the first race of the 2011 IZOD IndyCar Series season. The race took place on March 27, on the 1.800-mile (2.897 km) temporary street circuit in St. Petersburg, Florida, and was telecast by ABC in the United States.

== Report ==
=== Background ===
Dario Franchitti began the season as defending champion of the IndyCar Series, after a season-long battle with Will Power in 2010. It was Franchitti's second championship in the past three seasons. (The year he did not win, 2008, he was racing in NASCAR.) Other contenders for the 2011 championship include Franchitti's Chip Ganassi Racing teammates, Scott Dixon, Charlie Kimball, and Graham Rahal, the Penske Racing drivers, Ryan Briscoe, Hélio Castroneves, and Will Power, among others. Tony Kanaan left Andretti Autosport after the 2010 season and was now piloting the #82 entry for KV Racing Technology – Lotus. Briscoe, Castroneves, Power, and Rahal were all previous winners of the St. Petersburg race.

The race marked the IndyCar debut or return for several drivers, including:

- Sébastien Bourdais (Champ Car champion, 2004–07) He would ultimately not start because of his car catching fire after a crash in the final practice.
- Oriol Servià (Champ Car driver 2000–2007, IRL in 2008, also ran in the 2009 Indy 500)
- Charlie Kimball
- J. R. Hildebrand
- James Jakes

=== Race ===
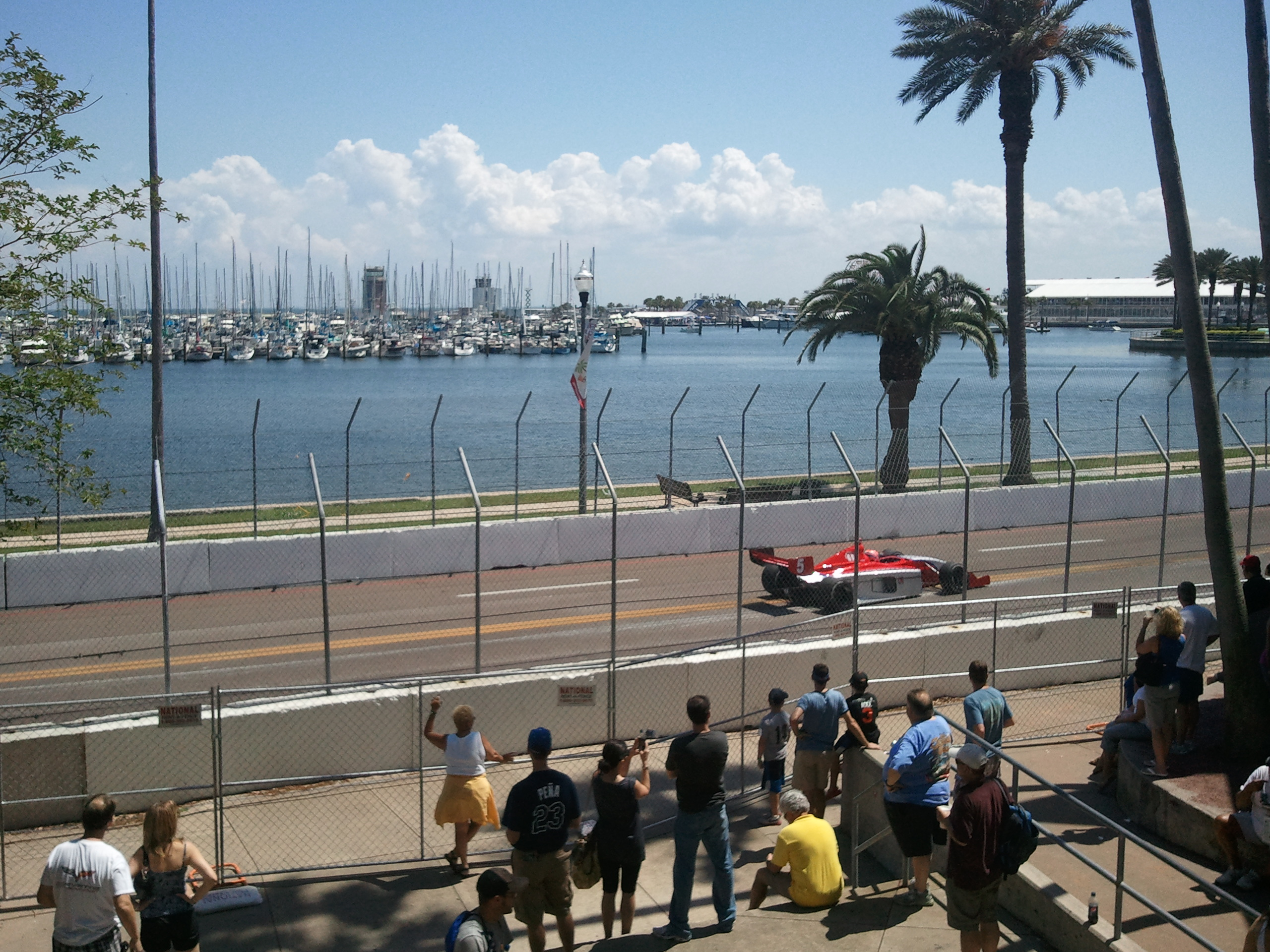
The Bay Shore Drive SE section of the race

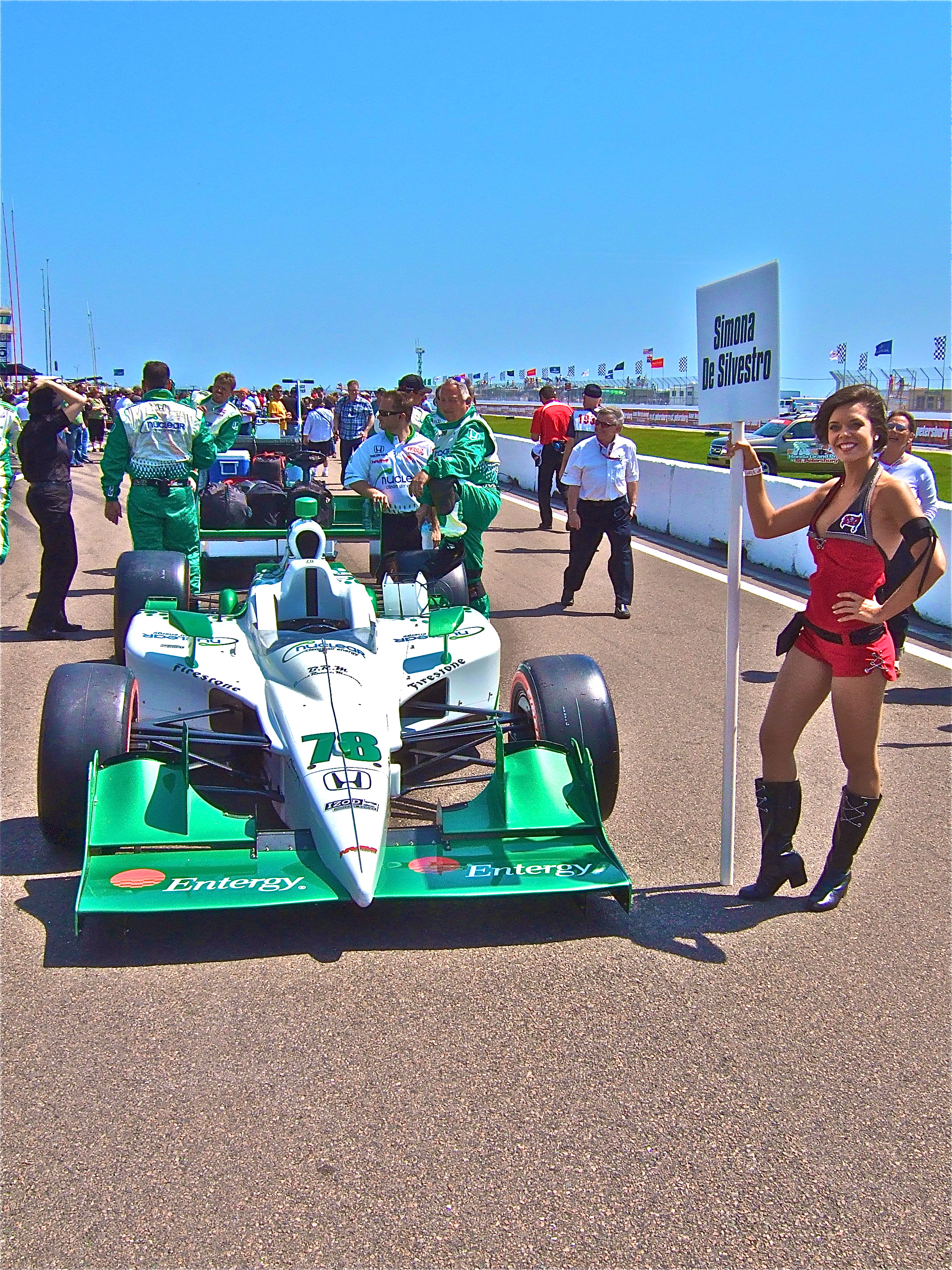
2011 HVM Entergy sponsored entry on the starting grid for the season opener.

The first Indycar race to use double-file starts and restarts began anything but smoothly. On turn 1 of lap 1, five cars were involved in contact as the drivers fought for position. Helio Castroneves made contact with Marco Andretti's car, who ran up the back of Scott Dixon's machine and flipped upside down. Mike Conway, racing for the first time since last year's Indianapolis 500, was also caught in the pile-up, along with Briscoe. Castroneves, Briscoe, and Dixon would finish the day running, but had no chance for victory. Andretti Autosport took the brunt of the blow, with two of their drivers, Andretti and Conway, being knocked out of the race as a result. On the ensuing restart (lap 5) Dario Franchitti and Tony Kanaan passed Power to take first and second position respectively.

The yellow flag came out again on lap 7 when E. J. Viso spun off the track, but without making contact, and green flag racing resumed by lap 10. Only two laps later however, the caution came out again for debris on the racetrack, and Sebastián Saavedra spun and stalled on the ensuing restart, bringing out yet another caution. In total, nine of the first 15 laps were run under yellow, leading many drivers and fans to question the new restart system. Will Power briefly regained the lead on lap 71 when Franchitti pitted, but he had to pit himself two laps later, and Franchitti won comfortably by 6.7 seconds. The main point of interest over the final 10 laps was the battle for 3rd place between the veteran Kanaan and second-year driver Simona de Silvestro. Kanaan was able to hold on and gain a podium place for his new team, KV-Lotus, but it was an impressive run by de Silvestro nonetheless.

== Classification ==
=== Qualifying ===
- All cars were split into two groups of twelve, with the fastest six from each group going through to the "top 12" session. In this session, the fastest six cars progressed to the "Firestone Fast Six." The fastest driver in the final session claimed pole, with the rest of the cars lining up in session order, regardless of qualifying times. (fast six from 1–6, top 12 from 7–12 and round 1 from 13 to 24, with group 1 drivers occupying the odd–numbered grid positions, and group 2 drivers occupying the even–numbered grid positions.

Pos	No.	Driver	Team	Group 1	Group 2	Top 12	Fast 6
1	12	(Australia) Will Power	Team Penske		1:02.3384	1:02.1878	1:01.9625
2	10	(United Kingdom) Dario Franchitti	Chip Ganassi Racing	1:02.3848		1:02.4136	1:02.2953
3	9	(New Zealand) Scott Dixon	Chip Ganassi Racing		1:02.7788	1:02.4735	1:02.3975
4	27	(United Kingdom) Mike Conway	Andretti Autosport		1:02.8057	1:02.4244	1:02.5306
5	6	(Australia) Ryan Briscoe	Team Penske		1:02.6031	1:02.5737	1:02.5744
6	22	(United Kingdom) Justin Wilson	Dreyer & Reinbold Racing	1:02.9866		1:02.5573	1:02.7729
7	26	(United States) Marco Andretti	Andretti Autosport	1:03.0526		1:02.6312	
8	82	(Brazil) Tony Kanaan	KV Racing Technology – Lotus		1:02.9362	1:02.7818	
9	3	(Brazil) Hélio Castroneves	Team Penske	1:02.6654		1:02.8204	
10	77	(Canada) Alex Tagliani	Sam Schmidt Motorsports		1:02.9467	1:02.8225	
11	5	(Japan) Takuma Sato	KV Racing Technology – Lotus	1:03.0722		1:02.9312	
12	38	(United States) Graham Rahal	Chip Ganassi Racing	1:03.1224		1:03.0640	
13	14	(Brazil) Vítor Meira	A. J. Foyt Enterprises	1:03.1315			
14	28	(United States) Ryan Hunter–Reay	Andretti Autosport		1:03.1778		
15	02	(Spain) Oriol Servià	Newman/Haas Racing	1:03.2434			
16	17	(Brazil) Raphael Matos	AFS Racing		1:03.2594		
17	78	(Switzerland) Simona de Silvestro	HVM Racing	1:03.2724			
18	19	(France) Sébastien Bourdais	Dale Coyne Racing		1:03.3188		
19	7	(United States) Danica Patrick	Andretti Autosport	1:03.3764			
20	24	(Brazil) Ana Beatriz (R)	Dreyer & Reinbold Racing		1:03.8036		
21	59	(Venezuela) E. J. Viso	KV Racing Technology – Lotus	1:03.4065			
22	18	(United Kingdom) James Jakes (R)	Dale Coyne Racing		1:03.8854		
23	83	(United States) Charlie Kimball (R)	Chip Ganassi Racing	1:03.5162			
24	4	(United States) J. R. Hildebrand (R)	Panther Racing	1:03.8256			
25	34	(Colombia) Sebastián Saavedra (R)	Conquest Racing		1:03.9696		

=== Race ===
Pos	No.	Driver	Team	Laps	Time/Retired	Grid	Laps Led	Points
1	10	(United Kingdom) Dario Franchitti	Chip Ganassi Racing	100	2:00:59.6886	2	94	52
2	12	(Australia) Will Power	Team Penske	100	+ 7.1612	1	6	41
3	82	(Brazil) Tony Kanaan	KV Racing Technology – Lotus	100	+ 16.1045	8	0	35
4	78	(Switzerland) Simona de Silvestro	HVM Racing	100	+ 16.5616	17	0	32
5	5	(Japan) Takuma Sato	KV Racing Technology – Lotus	100	+ 29.9435	11	0	30
6	77	(Canada) Alex Tagliani	Sam Schmidt Motorsports	100	+ 30.4655	10	0	28
7	17	(Brazil) Raphael Matos	AFS Racing	100	+ 31.5227	16	0	26
8	14	(Brazil) Vítor Meira	A. J. Foyt Enterprises	100	+ 35.7291	13	0	24
9	02	(Spain) Oriol Servià	Newman/Haas Racing	100	+ 49.1432	15	0	22
10	22	(United Kingdom) Justin Wilson	Dreyer & Reinbold Racing	100	+ 56.8025	6	0	20
11	4	(United States) J. R. Hildebrand (R)	Panther Racing	100	+ 1:02.9747	24	0	19
12	7	(United States) Danica Patrick	Andretti Autosport	100	+ 1:02.9748	19	0	18
13	34	(Colombia) Sebastián Saavedra (R)	Conquest Racing	98	+ 2 Laps	25	0	17
14	24	(Brazil) Ana Beatriz (R)	Dreyer & Reinbold Racing	98	+ 2 Laps	20	0	16
15	18	(United Kingdom) James Jakes (R)	Dale Coyne Racing	97	+ 3 Laps	22	0	15
16	9	(New Zealand) Scott Dixon	Chip Ganassi Racing	96	+ 4 Laps	3	0	14
17	38	(United States) Graham Rahal	Chip Ganassi Racing	96	+ 4 Laps	12	0	13
18	6	(Australia) Ryan Briscoe	Team Penske	95	+ 5 Laps	5	0	12
19	59	(Venezuela) E. J. Viso	KV Racing Technology – Lotus	94	+ 6 Laps	21	0	12
20	3	(Brazil) Hélio Castroneves	Team Penske	85	+ 15 Laps	9	0	12
21	28	(United States) Ryan Hunter–Reay	Andretti Autosport	58	Handling	14	0	12
22	83	(United States) Charlie Kimball (R)	Chip Ganassi Racing	38	Contact	23	0	12
23	27	(United Kingdom) Mike Conway	Andretti Autosport	1	Contact	4	0	12
24	26	(United States) Marco Andretti	Andretti Autosport	0	Contact	7	0	12
25	19	(France) Sébastien Bourdais	Dale Coyne Racing	0	Did not start	18	0	5
OFFICIAL RACE REPORT

== Championship standings after the race ==
Drivers' Championship standings

Pos	Driver	Points
1	(United Kingdom) Dario Franchitti	52
2	(Australia) Will Power	41
3	(Brazil) Tony Kanaan	35
4	(Switzerland) Simona de Silvestro	32
5	(Japan) Takuma Sato	30

- Note: Only the top five positions are included.

Previous race: 2010 Cafés do Brasil Indy 300	IZOD IndyCar Series; 2011 season	Next race: 2011 Indy Grand Prix of Alabama
Previous race: 2010 Honda Grand Prix of St. Petersburg	Honda Grand Prix of St. Petersburg	Next race: 2012 Honda Grand Prix of St. Petersburg
