= 2013 São Paulo Indy 300 =

(Brazil) 2013 Streets of São Paulo
Race details
- 4th round of the 2013 IndyCar Series season
- Date: May 5, 2013
- Official name: Itaipava São Paulo Indy 300 presented by Nestlé
- Location: Santana – São Paulo city
- Course: Temporary street circuit 2.536 mi / 4.081 km
- Distance: 75 laps 190.200 mi / 306.097 km
- Weather: 79 °F (26 °C), mostly cloudy

Pole position
- Driver: (United States) Ryan Hunter-Reay (Andretti Autosport)
- Time: 1:20.4312

Fastest lap
- Driver: (Brazil) Tony Kanaan (KV Racing Technology)
- Time: 80.4364 (on lap 60 of 75)

Podium
- First: (Canada) James Hinchcliffe (Andretti Autosport)
- Second: (Japan) Takuma Sato (A. J. Foyt Enterprises)
- Third: (United States) Marco Andretti (Andretti Autosport)

The Itaipava São Paulo Indy 300 presented by Nestlé was the fourth race of the 2013 IZOD IndyCar Series season. The race took place on May 5, 2013, on the 2.536-mile (4.081 km) temporary street circuit in São Paulo, Brazil, and was telecasted by the NBC Sports Network in the United States.

Canadian James Hinchcliffe won the race, his second win of the season, by passing Takuma Sato, winner of the previous race in Long Beach, on the final corner of the final lap. As of 2026, the race is the most recent IndyCar event to take place outside of North America, until the planned debut of the IndyCar Grand Prix of Barcelona in 2027.

== Classification ==
=== Starting grid ===
Row	Inside		Outside	
1	1	(United States) Ryan Hunter-Reay	5	(Venezuela) E. J. Viso
2	10	(United Kingdom) Dario Franchitti	11	(Brazil) Tony Kanaan
3	27	(Canada) James Hinchcliffe	9	(New Zealand) Scott Dixon
4	7	(France) Sebastian Bourdais	78	(Switzerland) Simona de Silvestro
5	19	(United Kingdom) Justin Wilson	25	(United States) Marco Andretti
6	4	(United States) J. R. Hildebrand	14	(Japan) Takuma Sato
7	22	(Spain) Oriol Servià	20	(United States) Ed Carpenter
8	98	(Canada) Alex Tagliani	18	(Brazil) Ana Beatriz
9	83	(United States) Charlie Kimball	3	(Brazil) Hélio Castroneves
10	15	(United States) Graham Rahal	6	(Colombia) Sebastián Saavedra
11	55	(France) Tristan Vautier (R)	12	(Australia) Will Power
12	77	(France) Simon Pagenaud	16	(United Kingdom) James Jakes
13	67	(United States) Josef Newgarden		

=== Race results ===
Pos	No.	Driver	Team	Engine	Laps	Time/Retired	Pit Stops	Grid	Laps Led	Points^{1}
1	27	(Canada) James Hinchcliffe	Andretti Autosport	Chevrolet	75	2:09:34.7383	3	5	1	51
2	14	(Japan) Takuma Sato	A. J. Foyt Enterprises	Honda	75	+ 0.3463	4	12	22	43
3	25	(United States) Marco Andretti	Andretti Autosport	Chevrolet	75	+ 1.1376	4	10	7	36
4	22	(Spain) Oriol Servià	Panther Dreyer & Reinbold Racing	Chevrolet	75	+ 1.1745	2	13		32
5	67	(United States) Josef Newgarden	Sarah Fisher Hartman Racing	Honda	75	+ 1.6516	3	25		30
6	5	(Venezuela) E. J. Viso	Andretti Autosport	Chevrolet	75	+ 2.8119	2	2		28
7	10	(United Kingdom) Dario Franchitti	Chip Ganassi Racing	Honda	75	+ 3.5961	2	3		26
8	78	(Switzerland) Simona de Silvestro	KV Racing Technology	Chevrolet	75	+ 4.2772	2	8		24
9	77	(France) Simon Pagenaud	Schmidt Hamilton Motorsports	Honda	75	+ 7.6331	6	23		22
10	83	(United States) Charlie Kimball	Chip Ganassi Racing	Honda	75	+ 9.0265	3	17		20
11	1	(United States) Ryan Hunter-Reay	Andretti Autosport	Chevrolet	75	+ 9.5135	2	1	16	21
12	98	(Canada) Alex Tagliani	Barracuda Racing	Honda	75	+ 10.4393	3	15		18
13	3	(Brazil) Hélio Castroneves	Team Penske	Chevrolet	75	+ 11.1234	6	18		17
14	7	(France) Sebastian Bourdais	Dragon Racing	Chevrolet	75	+ 13.6406	5	7	13	17
15	4	(United States) J. R. Hildebrand	Panther Racing	Chevrolet	75	+ 13.7377	4	11	4	16
16	55	(France) Tristan Vautier	Schmidt Peterson Motorsports	Honda	75	+ 14.3517	2	21		14
17	16	(United Kingdom) James Jakes	Rahal Letterman Lanigan Racing	Honda	75	+ 19.8585	6	24		13
18	9	(New Zealand) Scott Dixon	Chip Ganassi Racing	Honda	75	+ 29.4261	3	6		12
19	6	(Colombia) Sebastián Saavedra	Dragon Racing	Chevrolet	75	+ 54.7223	4	20		11
20	19	(United Kingdom) Justin Wilson	Dale Coyne Racing	Honda	73	+ 2 laps	5	9		10
21	11	(Brazil) Tony Kanaan	KV Racing Technology	Chevrolet	72	+ 3 laps	2	4	12	10
22	15	(United States) Graham Rahal	Rahal Letterman Lanigan Racing	Honda	71	+ 4 laps	4	19		8
23	20	(United States) Ed Carpenter	Ed Carpenter Racing	Chevrolet	71	+ 4 laps	6	14		7
24	12	(Australia) Will Power	Team Penske	Chevrolet	17	Mechanical	1	22		6
25	18	(Brazil) Ana Beatriz	Dale Coyne Racing	Honda	6	Mechanical	0	16		5

Notes

^{1} Points include 1 point for leading at least 1 lap during a race, an additional 2 points for leading the most race laps, and 1 point for Pole Position.

== Standings after the race ==
	Pos.	Driver	Points
1	1	(Japan) Takuma Sato	136
2	2	(United States) Marco Andretti	123
2	3	(Brazil) Hélio Castroneves	116
6	4	(Canada) James Hinchcliffe	112
2	5	(New Zealand) Scott Dixon	101
	6	(United States) Ryan Hunter-Reay	94
2	7	(United Kingdom) Justin Wilson	91
6	8	(Spain) Oriol Servià	89
	9	(Switzerland) Simona de Silvestro	86
1	10	(United States) Charlie Kimball	80

- Note: Only the top ten positions are included.

Previous race: 2013 Toyota Grand Prix of Long Beach	IndyCar Series; 2013 season	Next race: 2013 Indianapolis 500
Previous race: 2012 São Paulo Indy 300	São Paulo Indy 300	Next race: N/A
