= 2011 Toyota Grand Prix of Long Beach =

(United States) 2011 Long Beach
Race details
- 3rd round of the 2011 IndyCar Series season
- Date: April 17, 2011
- Official name: Toyota Grand Prix of Long Beach
- Location: Streets of Long Beach
- Course: Temporary street circuit 1.968 mi / 3.167 km
- Distance: 85 laps 167.280 mi / 269.211 km
- Weather: 66 °F (19 °C), clear skies

Pole position
- Driver: (Australia) Will Power (Team Penske)
- Time: 1:09.0649

Fastest lap
- Driver: (United Kingdom) Dario Franchitti (Chip Ganassi Racing)
- Time: 1:10.6597 (on lap 84 of 85)

Podium
- First: (United Kingdom) Mike Conway (Andretti Autosport)
- Second: (Australia) Ryan Briscoe (Team Penske)
- Third: (United Kingdom) Dario Franchitti (Chip Ganassi Racing)

Chronology
Previous	Next
2010	2012

The 2011 Toyota Grand Prix of Long Beach was the third race of the 2011 IZOD IndyCar Series season. The race took place on April 17, on the 1.968-mile (3.167 km) Long Beach Street Circuit in Long Beach, California, and was telecast by Versus in the United States.

== Classification ==
=== Qualifying ===
- All cars were split into two groups of twelve, with the fastest six from each group going through to the "top 12" session. In this session, the fastest six cars progressed to the "Firestone Fast Six." The fastest driver in the final session claimed pole, with the rest of the cars lining up in session order, regardless of qualifying times (fast six from 1–6, top 12 from 7–12 and round 1 from 13–24, with group 1 drivers occupying the odd–numbered grid positions, and group 2 drivers occupying the even–numbered grid positions).

Pos	No.	Driver	Team	Group 1	Group 2	Top 12	Fast 6
1	12	(Australia) Will Power	Team Penske	1:09.2846		1:09.3572	1:09.0649
2	28	(United States) Ryan Hunter–Reay	Andretti Autosport		1:09.3599	1:09.2348	1:09.1409
3	27	(United Kingdom) Mike Conway	Andretti Autosport	1:09.7079		1:09.5181	1:09.6414
4	2	(Spain) Oriol Servià	Newman/Haas Racing	1:09.9073		1:09.5768	1:09.6828
5	22	(United Kingdom) Justin Wilson	Dreyer & Reinbold Racing		1:09.8550	1:09.4871	1:09.8097
6	3	(Brazil) Hélio Castroneves	Team Penske	1:09.8534		1:09.5484	1:09.8423
7	10	(United Kingdom) Dario Franchitti	Chip Ganassi Racing	1:09.6014		1:09.6037	
8	9	(New Zealand) Scott Dixon	Chip Ganassi Racing	1:09.7859		1:09.6385	
9	77	(Canada) Alex Tagliani	Sam Schmidt Motorsports		1:09.5686	1:09.6497	
10	82	(Brazil) Tony Kanaan	KV Racing Technology – Lotus		1:09.7595	1:09.7352	
11	06	(Canada) James Hinchcliffe (R)	Newman/Haas Racing		1:09.8358	1:09.8122	
12	6	(Australia) Ryan Briscoe	Team Penske		1:09.5104	1:09.8243	
13	14	(Brazil) Vítor Meira	A. J. Foyt Enterprises	1:10.1010			
14	26	(United States) Marco Andretti	Andretti Autosport		1:09.9400		
15	34	(Colombia) Sebastián Saavedra (R)	Conquest Racing	1:10.1146			
16	38	(United States) Graham Rahal	Chip Ganassi Racing		1:10.5883		
17	59	(Venezuela) E. J. Viso	KV Racing Technology – Lotus	1:10.1465			
18	78	(Switzerland) Simona de Silvestro	HVM Racing		1:10.6407		
19	17	(Brazil) Raphael Matos	AFS Racing	1:10.3477			
20	7	(United States) Danica Patrick	Andretti Autosport		1:10.7836		
21	19	(France) Sébastien Bourdais	Dale Coyne Racing	1:10.8050			
22	5	(Japan) Takuma Sato	KV Racing Technology – Lotus		1:10.8197		
23	18	(United Kingdom) James Jakes (R)	Dale Coyne Racing	1:10.8592			
24	83	(United States) Charlie Kimball (R)	Chip Ganassi Racing		1:10.8672		
25	8	(Canada) Paul Tracy	Dragon Racing	1:11.0249			
26	24	(Brazil) Ana Beatriz (R)	Dreyer & Reinbold Racing		1:11.0341		
27	4	(United States) J. R. Hildebrand (R)	Panther Racing		1:11.4916		

=== Race ===
Pos	No.	Driver	Team	Laps	Time/Retired	Grid	Laps Led	Points
1	27	(United Kingdom) Mike Conway	Andretti Autosport	85	1:53:11.1000	3	14	50
2	6	(Australia) Ryan Briscoe	Team Penske	85	+ 6.3203	12	35	42
3	10	(United Kingdom) Dario Franchitti	Chip Ganassi Racing	85	+ 6.7163	7	0	35
4	06	(Canada) James Hinchcliffe (R)	Newman/Haas Racing	85	+ 9.1705	11	0	32
5	77	(Canada) Alex Tagliani	Sam Schmidt Motorsports	85	+ 16.0177	9	4	30
6	2	(Spain) Oriol Servià	Newman/Haas Racing	85	+ 16.8966	4	0	28
7	7	(United States) Danica Patrick	Andretti Autosport	85	+ 17.5016	20	0	26
8	82	(Brazil) Tony Kanaan	KV Racing Technology – Lotus	85	+ 18.9655	10	0	24
9	14	(Brazil) Vítor Meira	A. J. Foyt Enterprises	85	+ 19.4723	13	0	22
10	12	(Australia) Will Power	Team Penske	85	+ 19.8909	1	29	21
11	17	(Brazil) Raphael Matos	AFS Racing	85	+ 20.4660	19	0	19
12	3	(Brazil) Hélio Castroneves	Team Penske	85	+ 20.7784	6	0	18
13	38	(United States) Graham Rahal	Chip Ganassi Racing	85	+ 21.3464	16	0	17
14	34	(Colombia) Sebastián Saavedra (R)	Conquest Racing	85	+ 23.1137	15	0	16
15	18	(United Kingdom) James Jakes (R)	Dale Coyne Racing	85	+ 24.5926	23	0	15
16	8	(Canada) Paul Tracy	Dragon Racing	85	+ 1:03.7578	25	0	14
17	4	(United States) J. R. Hildebrand (R)	Panther Racing	85	+ 1:10.9001	27	0	13
18	9	(New Zealand) Scott Dixon	Chip Ganassi Racing	84	+ 1 Lap	8	1	12
19	24	(Brazil) Ana Beatriz (R)	Dreyer & Reinbold Racing	83	+ 2 Laps	26	0	12
20	78	(Switzerland) Simona de Silvestro	HVM Racing	82	+ 3 Laps	18	0	12
21	5	(Japan) Takuma Sato	KV Racing Technology – Lotus	81	+ 4 Laps	22	0	12
22	22	(United Kingdom) Justin Wilson	Dreyer & Reinbold Racing	78	+ 7 Laps	5	0	12
23	28	(United States) Ryan Hunter–Reay	Andretti Autosport	72	Mechanical	2	2	12
24	83	(United States) Charlie Kimball (R)	Chip Ganassi Racing	66	Mechanical	24	0	12
25	59	(Venezuela) E. J. Viso	KV Racing Technology – Lotus	59	Contact	17	0	10
26	26	(United States) Marco Andretti	Andretti Autosport	37	Suspension	14	0	10
27	19	(France) Sébastien Bourdais	Dale Coyne Racing	27	Contact	21	0	10
OFFICIAL RACE REPORT

== Championship standings after the race ==
Drivers' Championship standings

Pos	Driver	Points
1	(United Kingdom) Dario Franchitti	122
2	(Australia) Will Power	115
3	(Brazil) Tony Kanaan	87
4	(Spain) Oriol Servià	80
5	(United Kingdom) Mike Conway	74

- Note: Only the top five positions are included.

Previous race: 2011 Indy Grand Prix of Alabama	IndyCar Series; 2011 season	Next race: 2011 São Paulo Indy 300
Previous race: 2010 Toyota Grand Prix of Long Beach	Grand Prix of Long Beach	Next race: 2012 Toyota Grand Prix of Long Beach
