= 2013 Toyota Grand Prix of Long Beach =

(United States) 2013 Long Beach
Race details
- 3rd round of the 2013 IndyCar Series season
- Date: April 21, 2013
- Official name: Toyota Grand Prix of Long Beach
- Location: Streets of Long Beach; Long Beach, California
- Course: Temporary street circuit 1.968 mi / 3.167 km
- Distance: 80 laps 157.44 mi / 253.375 km
- Weather: Temperatures up to 81 °F (27 °C); wind speeds up to 8.9 miles per hour (14.3 km/h)

Pole position
- Driver: (Scotland) Dario Franchitti (Chip Ganassi Racing)
- Time: 1:07.2379

Fastest lap
- Driver: (Venezuela) E. J. Viso (Andretti Autosport)
- Time: 1:09.0401 (on lap 45 of 80)

Podium
- First: (Japan) Takuma Sato (A. J. Foyt Enterprises)
- Second: (United States) Graham Rahal (Rahal Letterman Lanigan Racing)
- Third: (United Kingdom) Justin Wilson (Dale Coyne Racing)

Chronology
Previous	Next
2012	2014

The 2013 Toyota Grand Prix of Long Beach was the 39th annual running of the Toyota Grand Prix of Long Beach, and is also the third race of the 2013 IndyCar Series season, taking place on April 21, 2013 in Long Beach Street Circuit. The race was won by Takuma Sato of A. J. Foyt Enterprises.

== Report ==
=== Background ===
The first two rounds of the season were dominated by Andretti Autosport drivers James Hinchcliffe and defending series champion Ryan Hunter-Reay, with Hinchcliffe winning the Honda Grand Prix of St. Petersburg and Hunter-Reay winning the Indy Grand Prix of Alabama. The defending race winner was Will Power.

=== Qualifying ===
Dario Franchitti of Chip Ganassi Racing won his first pole position of 2013 after posting a qualifying lap speed of 105.369 mph (169.575 km/h) and a time of 1:07.2379. Ryan Hunter-Reay started in second with a speed of 105.282 mph (169.435 km/h), while Will Power and Takuma Sato started in third and fourth, respectively. In the second group of the first session, Marco Andretti was penalized for interference, and did not advance, starting in 26th.

==== Starting grid ====
Row	Inside		Outside	
1	10	(United Kingdom) Dario Franchitti	1	(United States) Ryan Hunter-Reay
2	12	(Australia) Will Power	14	(Japan) Takuma Sato
3	17	(United Kingdom) Mike Conway	3	(Brazil) Hélio Castroneves
4	27	(Canada) James Hinchcliffe	11	(Brazil) Tony Kanaan
5	83	(United States) Charlie Kimball	5	(Venezuela) E. J. Viso
6	15	(United States) Graham Rahal	4	(United States) J. R. Hildebrand
7	16	(United Kingdom) James Jakes	2	(United States) A. J. Allmendinger
8	7	(France) Sébastien Bourdais	67	(United States) Josef Newgarden
9	77	(France) Simon Pagenaud	22	(Spain) Oriol Servià
10	55	(France) Tristan Vautier (R)	78	(Switzerland) Simona de Silvestro
11	6	(Colombia) Sebastián Saavedra	98	(Canada) Alex Tagliani
12	18	(Brazil) Ana Beatriz	20	(United States) Ed Carpenter
13	19	(United Kingdom) Justin Wilson	25	(United States) Marco Andretti
14	9	(New Zealand) Scott Dixon		

== Race ==
Pole-sitter Dario Franchitti dominated the first 28 laps before falling behind Will Power. Power led until lap 30, in which he pitted, giving the lead to Takuma Sato, who did not relinquish the lead for the rest of the race to win his first career race in 52 starts, becoming the first Japanese driver to win an IndyCar Series race. The win was A. J. Foyt Enterprises' first victory since Airton Daré won the Ameristar Casino Indy 200 at Kansas in 2002. Graham Rahal finished second, Justin Wilson and Franchitti finished third and fourth, respectively. J. R. Hildebrand, Oriol Servia, Marco Andretti, Simon Pagenaud, Simona de Silvestro and Hélio Castroneves rounded out the top ten.

== Results ==
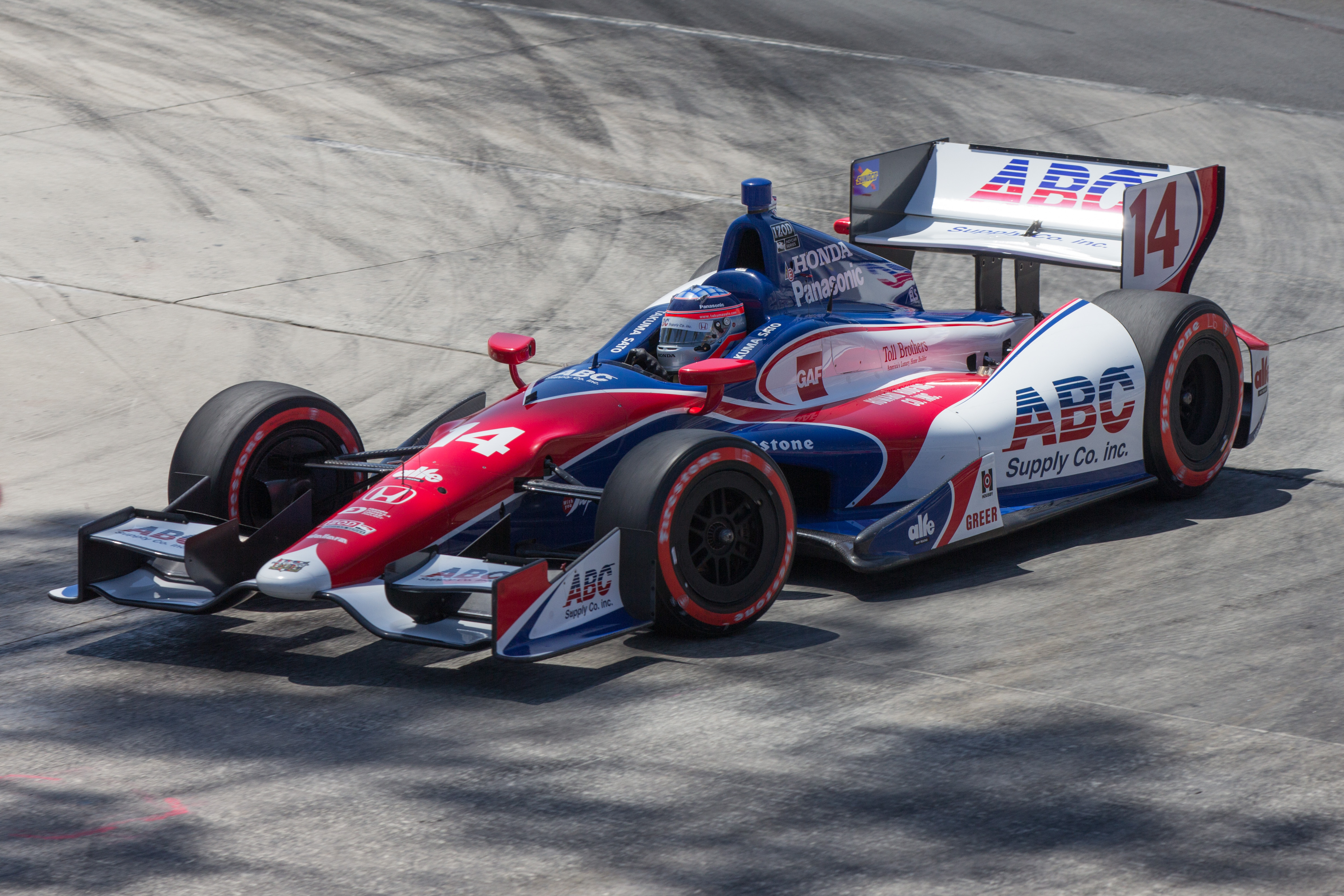
Takuma Sato in car #14 (AJ Foyt Enterprises) during Long Beach Grand Prix 2013

Pos	No.	Driver	Team	Engine	Laps	Time/Retired	Pit Stops	Grid	Laps Led	Points^{1}
1	14	(Japan) Takuma Sato	A. J. Foyt Enterprises	Honda	80	1:50:08.7155	2	4	50	53
2	15	(United States) Graham Rahal	Rahal Letterman Lanigan Racing	Honda	80	+ 5.3612	2	11		40
3	19	(United Kingdom) Justin Wilson	Dale Coyne Racing	Honda	80	+ 8.2386	3	24		35
4	10	(United Kingdom) Dario Franchitti	Chip Ganassi Racing	Honda	80	+ 12.3573	2	1	27	34
5	4	(United States) J. R. Hildebrand	Panther Racing	Chevrolet	80	+ 28.2402	2	12		30
6	22	(Spain) Oriol Servià	Panther Dreyer & Reinbold Racing	Chevrolet	80	+ 29.4683	2	18		28
7	25	(United States) Marco Andretti	Andretti Autosport	Chevrolet	80	+ 30.2703	3	25		26
8	77	(France) Simon Pagenaud	Schmidt Hamilton Motorsports	Honda	80	+ 31.8674	2	17		24
9	78	(Switzerland) Simona de Silvestro	KV Racing Technology	Chevrolet	80	+ 33.1224	3	19		22
10	3	(Brazil) Hélio Castroneves	Team Penske	Chevrolet	80	+ 33.4118	3	6		20
11	9	(New Zealand) Scott Dixon	Chip Ganassi Racing	Honda	80	+ 33.6278	3	26		19
12	16	(United Kingdom) James Jakes	Rahal Letterman Lanigan Racing	Honda	80	+ 35.0645	2	13		18
13	67	(United States) Josef Newgarden	Sarah Fisher Hartman Racing	Honda	80	+ 35.8945	3	16		17
14	18	(Brazil) Ana Beatriz	Dale Coyne Racing	Honda	80	+ 36.3442	3	22		16
15	7	(France) Sebastian Bourdais	Dragon Racing	Chevrolet	80	+ 36.5936	2	15		15
16	12	(Australia) Will Power	Team Penske	Chevrolet	80	+ 43.0022	3	3	2	15
17	55	(France) Tristan Vautier	Schmidt Peterson Motorsports	Honda	80	+ 51.7961	5	27		13
18	20	(United States) Ed Carpenter	Ed Carpenter Racing	Chevrolet	80	+ 56.4533	4	23		12
19	98	(Canada) Alex Tagliani	Barracuda Racing	Honda	79	+ 1 lap	5	21		11
20	11	(Brazil) Tony Kanaan	KV Racing Technology	Chevrolet	78	Contact	2	8		10
21	83	(United States) Charlie Kimball	Chip Ganassi Racing	Honda	78	+ 2 laps	4	9		9
22	5	(Venezuela) E. J. Viso	Andretti Autosport	Chevrolet	53	+ 27 laps	5	10		8
23	2	(United States) A. J. Allmendinger	Team Penske	Chevrolet	51	Mechanical	4	14		7
24	1	(United States) Ryan Hunter-Reay	Andretti Autosport	Chevrolet	49	Contact	3	2	1	7
25	17	(United Kingdom) Mike Conway	Rahal Letterman Lanigan Racing	Honda	38	Electrical	3	5		5
26	27	(Canada) James Hinchcliffe	Andretti Autosport	Chevrolet	34	Contact	1	7		5
27	6	(Colombia) Sebastián Saavedra	Dragon Racing	Chevrolet	1	Contact	0	20		5

Notes

^{1} Points include 1 point for leading at least 1 lap during a race, an additional 2 points for leading the most race laps, and 1 point for Pole Position.

== Standings after the race ==
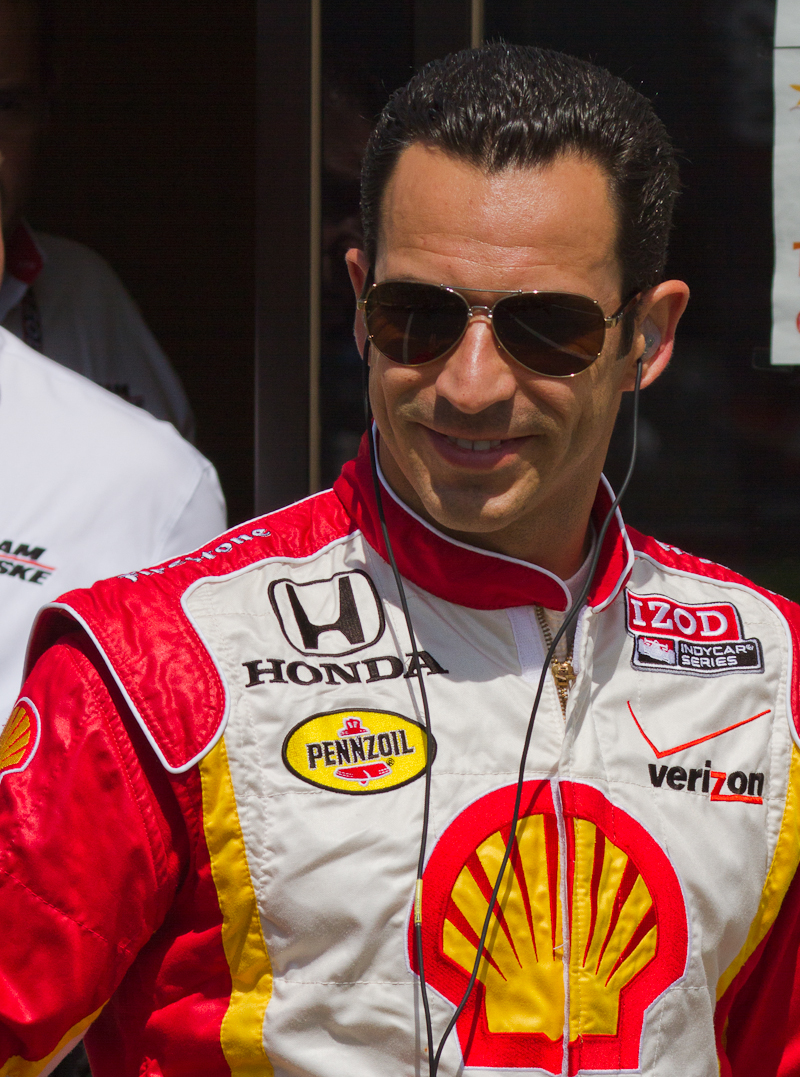
Helio Castroneves led the points standings after the race.

	Pos.	Driver	Points
	1	(Brazil) Hélio Castroneves	99
10	2	(Japan) Takuma Sato	93
1	3	(New Zealand) Scott Dixon	89
	4	(United States) Marco Andretti	87
4	5	(United Kingdom) Justin Wilson	81
3	6	(United States) Ryan Hunter-Reay	73
12	7	(United States) Graham Rahal	66
	8	(Australia) Will Power	62
2	9	(Switzerland) Simona de Silvestro	62
5	10	(Canada) James Hinchcliffe	61

- Note: Only the top ten positions are included.

Previous race: 2013 Honda Indy Grand Prix of Alabama	IndyCar Series; 2013 season	Next race: 2013 São Paulo Indy 300
Previous race: 2012 Toyota Grand Prix of Long Beach	Toyota Grand Prix of Long Beach	Next race: 2014 Toyota Grand Prix of Long Beach
