= 2011 Indy Grand Prix of Alabama =

(United States) 2011 Alabama
Race details
- 2nd round of the 2011 IndyCar Series season
- Date: April 10, 2011
- Official name: Indy Grand Prix of Alabama
- Location: Barber Motorsports Park, Birmingham, Alabama
- Course: Road course 2.300 mi / 3.700 km
- Distance: 90 laps 207.000 mi / 333.000 km
- Weather: 84 °F (29 °C), clear skies

Pole position
- Driver: (Australia) Will Power (Team Penske)
- Time: 1:11.4546

Fastest lap
- Driver: (New Zealand) Scott Dixon (Chip Ganassi Racing)
- Time: 1:13.8666 (on lap 73 of 90)

Podium
- First: (Australia) Will Power (Team Penske)
- Second: (New Zealand) Scott Dixon (Chip Ganassi Racing)
- Third: (United Kingdom) Dario Franchitti (Chip Ganassi Racing)

The 2011 Indy Grand Prix of Alabama was the second race of the 2011 IZOD IndyCar Series season. The race took place on April 10, on the 2.300-mile (3.701 km) road course in Birmingham, Alabama, and was telecast by Versus in the United States.

== Classification ==
=== Qualifying ===
- All cars were split into two groups of twelve, with the fastest six from each group going through to the "top 12" session. In this session, the fastest six cars progressed to the "Firestone Fast Six." The fastest driver in the final session claimed pole, with the rest of the cars lining up in session order, regardless of qualifying times. (fast six from 1–6, top 12 from 7–12 and round 1 from 13 to 24, with group 1 drivers occupying the odd–numbered grid positions, and group 2 drivers occupying the even–numbered grid positions.

Pos	No.	Driver	Team	Group 1	Group 2	Top 12	Fast 6
1	12	(Australia) Will Power	Team Penske	1:11.6683		1:11.3642	1:11.4546
2	6	(Australia) Ryan Briscoe	Team Penske	1:11.7811		1:11.4142	1:11.7361
3	9	(New Zealand) Scott Dixon	Chip Ganassi Racing		1:11.8418	1:11.3039	1:11.8826
4	3	(Brazil) Hélio Castroneves	Team Penske	1:11.8740		1:11.4043	1:12.1247
5	22	(United Kingdom) Justin Wilson	Dreyer & Reinbold Racing		1:12.1591	1:11.6825	1:12.3085
6	2	(Spain) Oriol Servià	Newman/Haas Racing	1:11.8679		1:11.7074	1:12.4394
7	10	(United Kingdom) Dario Franchitti	Chip Ganassi Racing	1:11.6913		1:11.7090	
8	06	(Canada) James Hinchcliffe (R)	Newman/Haas Racing		1:12.2447	1:11.8183	
9	26	(United States) Marco Andretti	Andretti Autosport		1:12.2115	1:11.8672	
10	38	(United States) Graham Rahal	Chip Ganassi Racing	1:11.9373		1:11.9712	
11	5	(Japan) Takuma Sato	KV Racing Technology – Lotus		1:12.4087	1:12.1667	
12	77	(Canada) Alex Tagliani	Sam Schmidt Motorsports		1:12.3780	1:12.3485	
13	78	(Switzerland) Simona de Silvestro	HVM Racing	1:12.2559			
14	17	(Brazil) Raphael Matos	AFS Racing		1:12.4094		
15	4	(United States) J. R. Hildebrand (R)	Panther Racing	1:12.2684			
16	27	(United Kingdom) Mike Conway	Andretti Autosport		1:12.5191		
17	28	(United States) Ryan Hunter–Reay	Andretti Autosport	1:12.3370			
18	59	(Venezuela) E. J. Viso	KV Racing Technology – Lotus		1:12.6582		
19	14	(Brazil) Vítor Meira	A. J. Foyt Enterprises	1:12.5677			
20	19	(France) Sébastien Bourdais	Dale Coyne Racing		1:12.6896		
21	83	(United States) Charlie Kimball (R)	Chip Ganassi Racing	1:12.5857			
22	7	(United States) Danica Patrick	Andretti Autosport		1:12.7257		
23	24	(France) Simon Pagenaud (R)	Dreyer & Reinbold Racing	1:12.5900			
24	82	(Brazil) Tony Kanaan	KV Racing Technology – Lotus		1:12.8892		
25	18	(United Kingdom) James Jakes (R)	Dale Coyne Racing	1:12.7147			
26	34	(Colombia) Sebastián Saavedra (R)	Conquest Racing		1:13.0858		

=== Race ===
Pos	No.	Driver	Team	Laps	Time/Retired	Grid	Laps Led	Points
1	12	(Australia) Will Power	Team Penske	90	2:14:42.9523	1	90	53
2	9	(New Zealand) Scott Dixon	Chip Ganassi Racing	90	+ 3.3828	3	0	40
3	10	(United Kingdom) Dario Franchitti	Chip Ganassi Racing	90	+ 15.5243	7	0	35
4	26	(United States) Marco Andretti	Andretti Autosport	90	+ 28.9601	9	0	32
5	2	(Spain) Oriol Servià	Newman/Haas Racing	90	+ 29.8817	6	0	30
6	82	(Brazil) Tony Kanaan	KV Racing Technology – Lotus	90	+ 30.3853	24	0	28
7	3	(Brazil) Hélio Castroneves	Team Penske	90	+ 30.7807	4	0	26
8	24	(France) Simon Pagenaud (R)	Dreyer & Reinbold Racing	90	+ 31.2095	23	0	24
9	78	(Switzerland) Simona de Silvestro	HVM Racing	90	+ 32.5812	13	0	22
10	83	(United States) Charlie Kimball (R)	Chip Ganassi Racing	90	+ 35.0038	21	0	20
11	19	(France) Sébastien Bourdais	Dale Coyne Racing	90	+ 35.9883	20	0	19
12	14	(Brazil) Vítor Meira	A. J. Foyt Enterprises	90	+ 42.6440	19	0	18
13	4	(United States) J. R. Hildebrand (R)	Panther Racing	90	+ 44.2950	15	0	17
14	28	(United States) Ryan Hunter–Reay	Andretti Autosport	90	+ 1:00.7427	17	0	16
15	77	(Canada) Alex Tagliani	Sam Schmidt Motorsports	90	+ 1:10.6879	12	0	15
16	5	(Japan) Takuma Sato	KV Racing Technology – Lotus	90	+ 1:12.1719	11	0	14
17	7	(United States) Danica Patrick	Andretti Autosport	89	+ 1 Lap	22	0	13
18	38	(United States) Graham Rahal	Chip Ganassi Racing	88	+ 2 Laps	10	0	12
19	22	(United Kingdom) Justin Wilson	Dreyer & Reinbold Racing	62	Contact	5	0	12
20	17	(Brazil) Raphael Matos	AFS Racing	62	Contact	14	0	12
21	6	(Australia) Ryan Briscoe	Team Penske	57	Contact	2	0	12
22	27	(United Kingdom) Mike Conway	Andretti Autosport	45	Contact	16	0	12
23	59	(Venezuela) E. J. Viso	KV Racing Technology – Lotus	40	Contact	18	0	12
24	06	(Canada) James Hinchcliffe (R)	Newman/Haas Racing	40	Contact	8	0	12
25	18	(United Kingdom) James Jakes (R)	Dale Coyne Racing	30	Mechanical	25	0	10
26	34	(Colombia) Sebastián Saavedra (R)	Conquest Racing	27	Mechanical	26	0	10
OFFICIAL RACE REPORT

== Championship standings after the race ==
Drivers' Championship standings

Pos	Driver	Points
1	(Australia) Will Power	94
2	(United Kingdom) Dario Franchitti	87
3	(Brazil) Tony Kanaan	63
4	(New Zealand) Scott Dixon	54
5	(Switzerland) Simona de Silvestro	54

- Note: Only the top five positions are included.

Previous race: 2011 Honda Grand Prix of St. Petersburg	IZOD IndyCar Series; 2011 season	Next race: 2011 Toyota Grand Prix of Long Beach
Previous race: 2010 Indy Grand Prix of Alabama	Indy Grand Prix of Alabama	Next race: 2012 Indy Grand Prix of Alabama
