= 2012 Indy Grand Prix of Alabama =

(United States) 2012 Alabama
Race details
- 2nd round of the 2012 IndyCar Series season
- Date: April 1, 2012
- Official name: Indy Grand Prix of Alabama
- Location: Barber Motorsports Park; Birmingham, Alabama
- Course: Road Course; 2.38 mi / 3.83 km
- Distance: 90 laps 214.2 mi / 344.7 km
- Weather: Temperatures reaching up to 84.9 °F (29.4 °C); wind speeds up to 9.9 miles per hour (15.9 km/h)

Pole position
- Driver: (Brazil) Hélio Castroneves (Team Penske)
- Time: 1:10.4768

Podium
- First: (Australia) Will Power (Verizon Team Penske)
- Second: (New Zealand) Scott Dixon (Target Chip Ganassi Racing)
- Third: (Brazil) Hélio Castroneves (AAA Team Penske)

The 2012 Indy Grand Prix of Alabama was the second race of the 2012 IndyCar Series season. The race was run on April 1, 2012 in Birmingham, Alabama, United States at Barber Motorsports Park.

== Report ==
=== Background ===
The first race of the 2012 IndyCar Series season in St. Petersburg, saw Hélio Castroneves capture his first victory since the 2010 season. Along with Castroneves, Scott Dixon and Ryan Briscoe were able to take advantage and lead throughout the race. Entering into the 2012 Indy Grand Prix of Alabama, Castroneves leads in the drivers' championship with 51 points, while Chevrolet leads in the manufacturers' championship.

=== Qualifying ===
There was very limited practice time during the week leading up to the Indy Grand Prix of Alabama. Friday's practice was cut short due to rain, while the practice on Saturday morning was canceled due to fog. After qualifying was completed on Saturday morning, it was Hélio Castroneves who sat on the pole for the 2012 Indy Grand Prix of Alabama in the #3 AAA Insurance Chevy owned by Roger Penske. Andretti Autosport's driver James Hinchcliffe sat on the outside of the first row in the #27 GoDaddy.com car.

=== Race ===
Scott Dixon led 38 laps and was leading on lap 66 when he made his final pit stop. A slow pit stop caused by trouble on the left rear tire, as well as traffic in the pit lane, allowed Will Power to pass him going into turn one. After all the leaders shuffled through their pit stops, Power took the lead, and held off Dixon over the final laps to win.

== Classification ==
=== Starting grid ===
Row	Inside		Outside	
1	3	(Brazil) Hélio Castroneves	27	(Canada) James Hinchcliffe
2	9	(New Zealand) Scott Dixon	14	(United Kingdom) Mike Conway
3	4	(United States) J. R. Hildebrand	11	(Brazil) Tony Kanaan
4	5	(Venezuela) E. J. Viso	38	(United States) Graham Rahal
5	12	(Australia) Will Power	77	(France) Simon Pagenaud (R)
6	28	(United States) Ryan Hunter-Reay	2	(Australia) Ryan Briscoe
7	26	(United States) Marco Andretti	8	(Brazil) Rubens Barrichello
8	67	(United States) Josef Newgarden (R)	15	(Japan) Takuma Sato
9	7	(France) Sebastian Bourdais	10	(United Kingdom) Dario Franchitti
10	18	(United Kingdom) Justin Wilson	19	(United Kingdom) James Jakes
11	78	(Switzerland) Simona de Silvestro	83	(United States) Charlie Kimball
12	20	(United States) Ed Carpenter	6	(United Kingdom) Katherine Legge (R)
13	98	(Canada) Alex Tagliani^{†}	22	(Spain) Oriol Servià^{†}
^{†} Tagliani and Servià penalised 10 places for changing engine

=== Race results ===
Pos	No.	Driver	Team	Engine	Laps	Time/Retired	Grid	Laps Led	Points^{1}
1	12	(Australia) Will Power	Team Penske	Chevrolet	90	2:01:40.1127	9	22	50
2	9	(New Zealand) Scott Dixon	Chip Ganassi Racing	Honda	90	+ 3.3709	3	38	42
3	3	(Brazil) Hélio Castroneves	Team Penske	Chevrolet	90	+ 19.1150	1	28	36
4	38	(United States) Graham Rahal	Chip Ganassi Racing	Honda	90	+ 19.3395	8	1	32
5	77	(France) Simon Pagenaud (R)	Schmidt Hamilton Motorsports	Honda	90	+ 20.1050	10	0	30
6	27	(Canada) James Hinchcliffe	Andretti Autosport	Chevrolet	90	+ 23.3093	2	1	28
7	14	(United Kingdom) Mike Conway	A. J. Foyt Enterprises	Honda	90	+ 24.5552	4	0	26
8	8	(Brazil) Rubens Barrichello	KV Racing Technology	Chevrolet	90	+ 25.4023	14	0	24
9	7	(France) Sebastian Bourdais	Dragon Racing	Lotus	90	+ 27.1815	17	0	22
10	10	(United Kingdom) Dario Franchitti	Chip Ganassi Racing	Honda	90	+ 32.7377	18	0	20
11	26	(United States) Marco Andretti	Andretti Autosport	Chevrolet	90	+ 33.5038	13	0	19
12	28	(United States) Ryan Hunter-Reay	Andretti Autosport	Chevrolet	90	+35.8730	11	0	18
13	22	(Spain) Oriol Servià	Dreyer & Reinbold Racing	Lotus	90	+ 37.8944	26	0	17
14	2	(Australia) Ryan Briscoe	Team Penske	Chevrolet	90	+ 41.6742	12	0	16
15	4	(United States) J. R. Hildebrand	Panther Racing	Chevrolet	90	+ 44.5059	5	0	15
16	19	(United Kingdom) James Jakes	Dale Coyne Racing	Honda	90	+ 54.5343	20	0	14
17	67	(United States) Josef Newgarden (R)	Sarah Fisher Hartman Racing	Honda	90	+ 1:00.6182	15	0	13
18	5	(Venezuela) E. J. Viso	KV Racing Technology	Chevrolet	89	+ 1 lap	7	0	12
19	18	(United Kingdom) Justin Wilson	Dale Coyne Racing	Honda	89	+ 1 lap	19	0	12
20	78	(Switzerland) Simona de Silvestro	HVM Racing	Lotus	89	+ 1 lap	21	0	12
21	11	(Brazil) Tony Kanaan	KV Racing Technology	Chevrolet	89	+ 1 lap	6	0	12
22	20	(United States) Ed Carpenter	Ed Carpenter Racing	Chevrolet	88	+ 2 laps	23	0	12
23	6	(United Kingdom) Katherine Legge (R)	Dragon Racing	Lotus	85	+ 5 laps	24	0	12
24	15	(Japan) Takuma Sato	Rahal Letterman Lanigan Racing	Honda	52	Mechanical	16	0	12
25	83	(United States) Charlie Kimball	Chip Ganassi Racing	Honda	45	Mechanical	22	0	10
26	98	(Canada) Alex Tagliani	Team Barracuda – BHA	Lotus	0	Mechanical	25	0	10

Notes

^{1} Points include 1 point for pole position and 2 points for most laps led.

== Standings after the race ==
Drivers' Championship

Pos	Driver	Points
1	(Brazil) Hélio Castroneves	86
2	(New Zealand) Scott Dixon	84
3	(Australia) Will Power	77
4	(Canada) James Hinchcliffe	60
5	(France) Simon Pagenaud (R)	58

Manufacturers' Championship

Pos	Manufacturer	Points
1	(United States) Chevrolet	18
2	(Japan) Honda	12
3	(United Kingdom) Lotus	6

- Note: Only the top five positions are included for the driver standings.

Previous race: 2012 Honda Grand Prix of St. Petersburg	IndyCar Series; 2012 season	Next race: 2012 Toyota Grand Prix of Long Beach
Previous race: 2011 Indy Grand Prix of Alabama	Indy Grand Prix of Alabama	Next race: 2013 Indy Grand Prix of Alabama
