= 2012 Honda Grand Prix of St. Petersburg =

(United States) 2012 St. Petersburg
Race details
- 1st round of the 2012 IndyCar Series season
- Date: March 25, 2012
- Official name: Honda Grand Prix of St. Petersburg
- Location: Streets of St. Petersburg
- Course: Temporary street circuit 1.800 mi / 2.897 km
- Distance: 100 laps 180.000 mi / 289.682 km
- Weather: 77 °F (25 °C), partly cloudy

Pole position
- Driver: (Australia) Will Power (Team Penske)
- Time: 1:01.3721

Fastest lap
- Driver: (Australia) Will Power (Team Penske)
- Time: 62.7575 (on lap 5 of 100)

Podium
- First: (Brazil) Hélio Castroneves (Team Penske)
- Second: (New Zealand) Scott Dixon (Target Chip Ganassi Racing)
- Third: (United States) Ryan Hunter-Reay (Andretti Autosport)

Chronology
Previous	Next
2011	2013

The 2012 Honda Grand Prix of St. Petersburg was the first race of the 2012 IndyCar Series season. It was held on March 25, 2012 in St. Petersburg, Florida on the city's temporary street course, and was won by Hélio Castroneves.

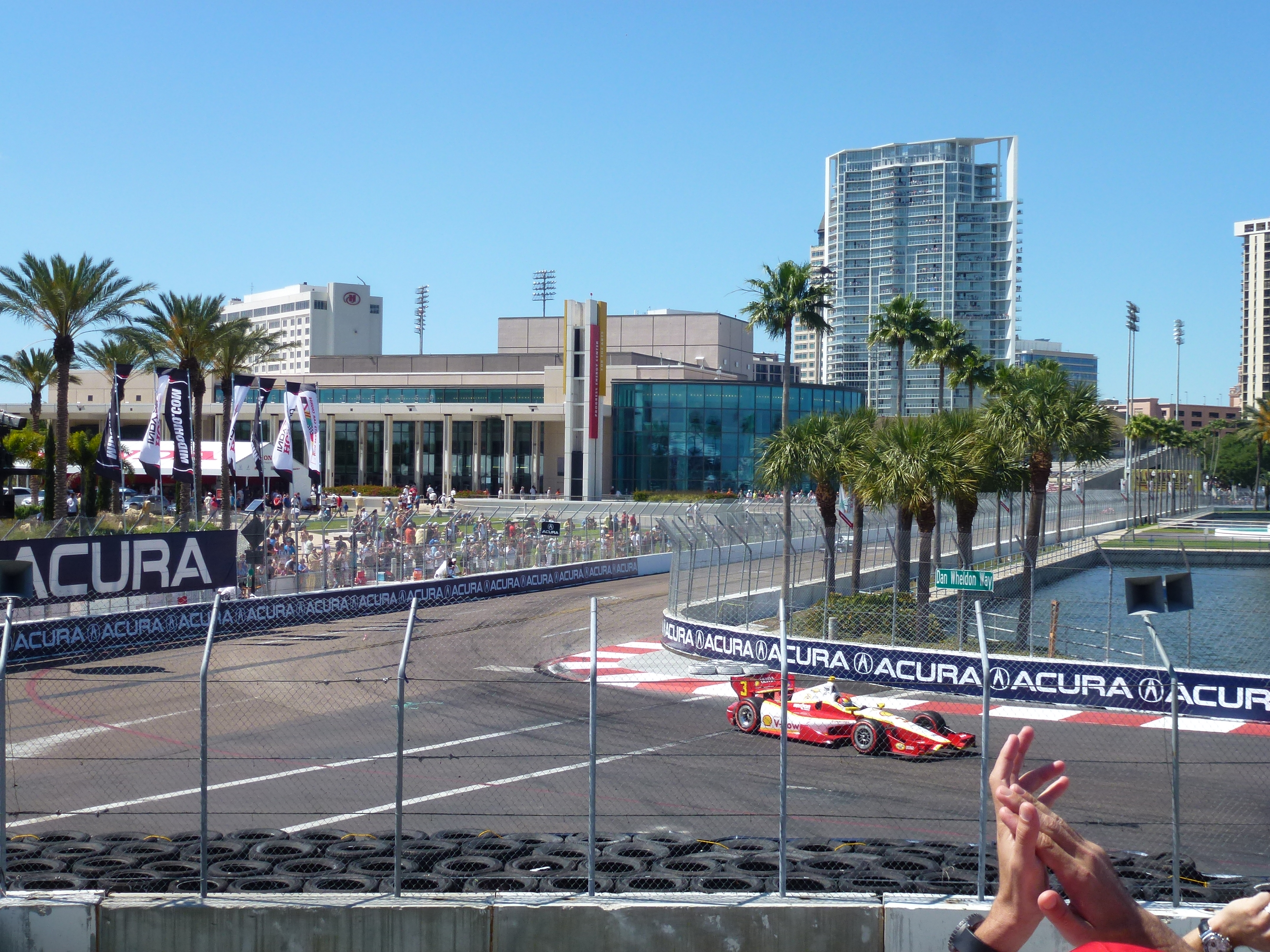
Hélio Castroneves making the run down Dan Wheldon Way on the final lap of the 2012 Honda Grand Prix of St. Petersburg.

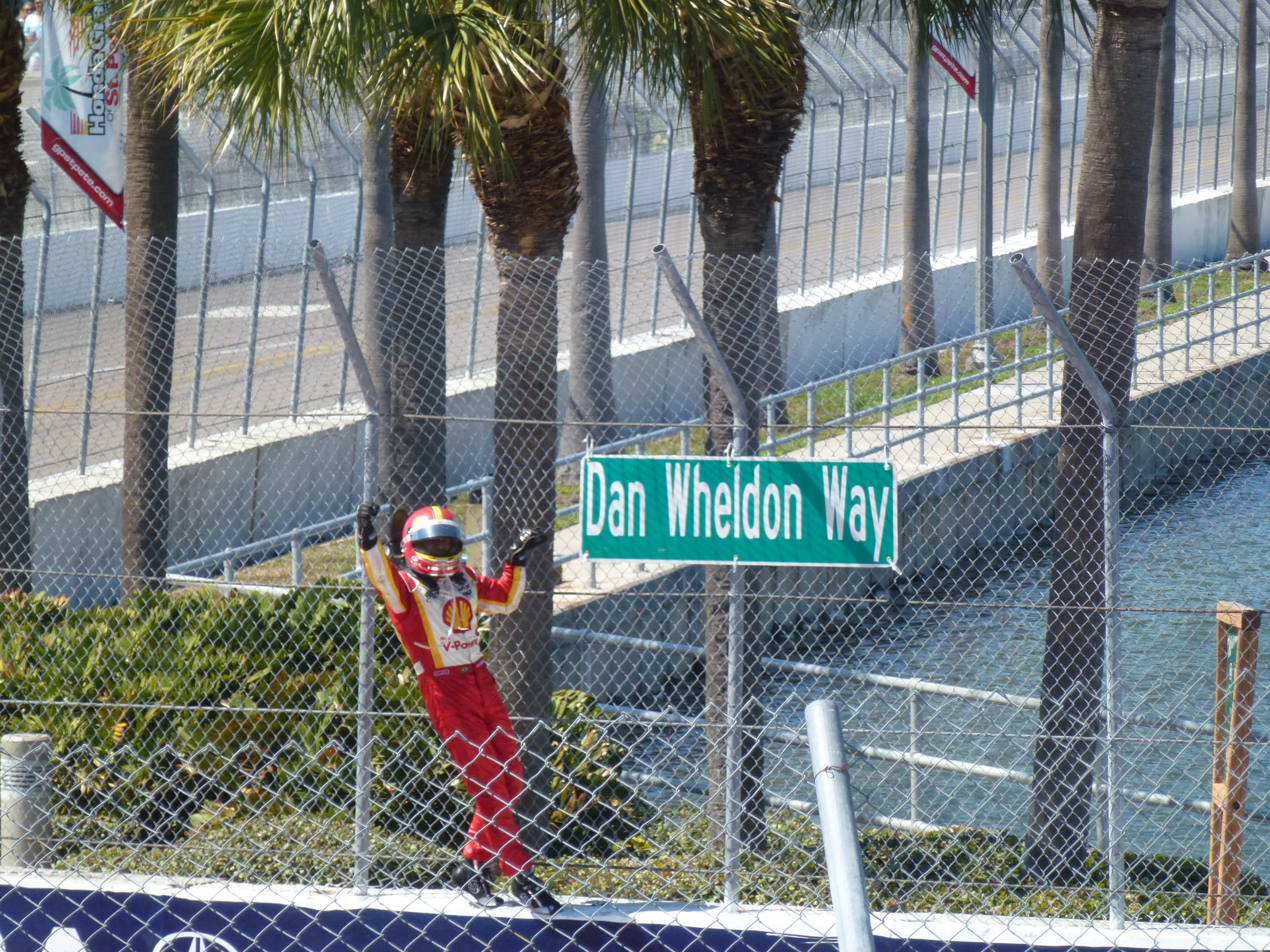
Hélio Castroneves stopped on Dan Wheldon Way (Turn 10) victory lap after winning the 2012 Honda Grand Prix of St. Petersburg to pay respects to the sign honouring the late resident of the city, a two-time Indianapolis 500 champion.

== Report ==
=== Background ===
This race was the first race since Dan Wheldon was killed in an accident, five month earlier during the 2011 IZOD IndyCar World Championship at Las Vegas Motor Speedway in October 2011. It was also the first race run with the new ICONIC chassis by Dallara, which Wheldon was helping to develop and was named the "DW12" in his honor. This race also marked the first time since the end of the 2005 season that Honda wouldn't be IndyCar's exclusive engine supplier. Chevrolet re-entered Indy racing for the first time since that season and Lotus was the third supplier.

=== Qualifying ===
For the third consecutive year, Will Power took the pole position for the Honda Grand Prix of St. Petersburg with a circuit-qualifying record of 1:01.3721. Alongside of Power, Penske teammate Ryan Briscoe will start in row one, in second position. The second row will be occupied Ryan Hunter-Reay and James Hinchcliffe, both of Andretti Autosport.

=== Race ===
The 2012 Honda Grand Prix of St. Petersburg started with pole sitter Will Power leading the field for the majority of the first few laps, with Ryan Briscoe, who qualified second, trailing behind him. Briscoe would eventually take the lead after Power pitted, in for fuel strategy. However, the pit stop by Power would eventually take him out of contention for the race, as he would not near the top spot for the remaining laps. While Briscoe did hold the top position for eight laps, it was Scott Dixon, who was consistently around the top and eventually would inherit the lead on lap 20. Throughout the entirety of the race, Lotus Cars such as rookie Katherine Legge and Simona de Silvestro face mechanical problems, as Lotus finished third between the manufactures, behind Chevrolet and Honda. During the mid-portion of the race, drivers such as Takuma Sato, defending series champion Dario Franchitti and J. R. Hildebrand would all hold a lead in the race. However, coming down to the end, it would be Hélio Castroneves and Dixon battling for the lead in the race and the victory. After a series of pit stops on lap 72, Castroneves would make a bold pass on Dixon, giving him position behind, then leader Hildebrand. This position would eventually allow him to inherit the lead of the race, as Castroneves would lead the final 26 laps, giving him the victory, his first victory since the 2010 season.

== Classification ==
=== Starting grid ===
Row	Inside		Outside	
1	12	(Australia) Will Power	2	(Australia) Ryan Briscoe
2	28	(United States) Ryan Hunter-Reay	27	(Canada) James Hinchcliffe
3	3	(Brazil) Hélio Castroneves	9	(New Zealand) Scott Dixon
4	26	(United States) Marco Andretti	11	(Brazil) Tony Kanaan
5	10	(United Kingdom) Dario Franchitti	38	(United States) Graham Rahal
6	14	(United Kingdom) Mike Conway	5	(Venezuela) E. J. Viso
7	8	(Brazil) Rubens Barrichello	15	(Japan) Takuma Sato
8	18	(United Kingdom) Justin Wilson	77	(France) Simon Pagenaud (R)^{†}
9	98	(Canada) Alex Tagliani	4	(United States) J. R. Hildebrand
10	67	(United States) Josef Newgarden (R)	19	(United Kingdom) James Jakes
11	78	(Switzerland) Simona de Silvestro	83	(United States) Charlie Kimball
12	22	(Spain) Oriol Servià	20	(United States) Ed Carpenter
13	6	(United Kingdom) Katherine Legge (R)	7	(France) Sébastien Bourdais
^{†} Pagenaud penalised 10 places for changing engine

=== Race results ===
Pos	No.	Driver	Team	Engine	Laps	Time/Retired	Grid	Laps Led	Points^{1}
1	3	(Brazil) Hélio Castroneves	Team Penske	Chevrolet	100	1:59:50.9863	5	28	50
2	9	(New Zealand) Scott Dixon	Chip Ganassi Racing	Honda	100	+ 5.5292	6	37	42
3	28	(United States) Ryan Hunter-Reay	Andretti Autosport	Chevrolet	100	+ 7.5824	3	0	35
4	27	(Canada) James Hinchcliffe	Andretti Autosport	Chevrolet	100	+ 10.6526	4	0	32
5	2	(Australia) Ryan Briscoe	Team Penske	Chevrolet	100	+ 11.7854	2	9	30
6	77	(France) Simon Pagenaud (R)	Schmidt Hamilton Motorsports	Honda	100	+ 31.2623	16	0	28
7	12	(Australia) Will Power	Team Penske	Chevrolet	100	+ 34.6582	1	11	27
8	5	(Venezuela) E. J. Viso	KV Racing Technology	Chevrolet	100	+ 35.5943	8	0	24
9	83	(United States) Charlie Kimball	Chip Ganassi Racing	Honda	100	+ 43.1425	22	0	22
10	18	(United Kingdom) Justin Wilson	Dale Coyne Racing	Honda	100	+ 44.3141	15	0	20
11	67	(United States) Josef Newgarden (R)	Sarah Fisher Hartman Racing	Honda	100	+ 44.8275	19	0	19
12	38	(United States) Graham Rahal	Chip Ganassi Racing	Honda	100	+ 45.1080	10	0	18
13	10	(United Kingdom) Dario Franchitti	Chip Ganassi Racing	Honda	100	+ 45.8468	9	1	17
14	26	(United States) Marco Andretti	Andretti Autosport	Chevrolet	99	+ 1 lap	7	0	16
15	98	(Canada) Alex Tagliani	Team Barracuda – BHA	Lotus	99	+ 1 lap	17	0	15
16	22	(Spain) Oriol Servià	Dreyer & Reinbold Racing	Lotus	99	+ 1 lap	23	0	14
17	8	(Brazil) Rubens Barrichello	KV Racing Technology	Chevrolet	98	+ 2 laps	13	0	13
18	20	(United States) Ed Carpenter	Ed Carpenter Racing	Chevrolet	98	+ 2 laps	24	0	12
19	4	(United States) J. R. Hildebrand	Panther Racing	Chevrolet	96	Off Course	18	3	12
20	14	(United Kingdom) Mike Conway	A. J. Foyt Enterprises	Honda	75	Mechanical	11	0	12
21	7	(France) Sébastien Bourdais	Dragon Racing	Lotus	73	Off Course	26	0	12
22	15	(Japan) Takuma Sato	Rahal Letterman Lanigan Racing	Honda	73	Electrical	14	11	12
23	6	(United Kingdom) Katherine Legge (R)	Dragon Racing	Lotus	59	Off Course	25	0	12
24	78	(Switzerland) Simona de Silvestro	HVM Racing	Lotus	22	Mechanical	21	0	12
25	11	(Brazil) Tony Kanaan	KV Racing Technology	Chevrolet	21	Electrical	8	0	10
26	19	(United Kingdom) James Jakes	Dale Coyne Racing	Honda	19	Contact	20	0	10

Notes

^{1} Points include 1 point for pole position and 2 points for most laps led.

== Championship standings after the race ==
Drivers' Championship standings

Pos	Driver	Points
1	(Brazil) Hélio Castroneves	50
2	(New Zealand) Scott Dixon	42
3	(United States) Ryan Hunter-Reay	35
4	(Canada) James Hinchcliffe	32
5	(Australia) Ryan Briscoe	30

- Note: Only the top five positions are included.

Previous race: 2011 IZOD IndyCar World Championship	IZOD IndyCar Series; 2012 season	Next race: 2012 Indy Grand Prix of Alabama
Previous race: 2011 Honda Grand Prix of St. Petersburg	Honda Grand Prix of St. Petersburg	Next race: 2013 Honda Grand Prix of St. Petersburg
