= 2012 Toyota Grand Prix of Long Beach =

(United States) 2012 Long Beach
Race details
- 3rd round of the 2012 IndyCar Series season
- Date: April 15, 2012
- Official name: Toyota Grand Prix of Long Beach
- Location: Streets of Long Beach; Long Beach, California
- Course: Temporary street circuit 1.968 mi / 3.167 km
- Distance: 85 laps 167.280 mi / 269.211 km
- Weather: Temperatures up to 68 °F (20 °C); wind speeds up to 13 miles per hour (21 km/h) with partly cloudy skies

Pole position
- Driver: (Australia) Ryan Briscoe (Team Penske)
- Time: 1:08.6089

Fastest lap
- Driver: (Brazil) Tony Kanaan (KV Racing Technology)
- Time: 1:09.3541 (on lap 73 of 85)

Podium
- First: (Australia) Will Power (Team Penske)
- Second: (France) Simon Pagenaud (Schmidt Hamilton Motorsports)
- Third: (Canada) James Hinchcliffe (Andretti Autosport)

Chronology
Previous	Next
2011	2013

The 2012 Toyota Grand Prix of Long Beach was the third race of the 2012 IndyCar Series season. The race was run on April 15, 2012, in Long Beach, California, United States at Streets of Long Beach.

== Report ==
=== Background ===
The first two races of the 2012 IndyCar Series season were held in St. Petersburg and Barber. The races were dominated by Team Penske with two poles and two wins in a row. In St. Petersburg, Will Power took the pole and Hélio Castroneves won the victory, but at Barber things were reversed. Going into Long Beach, Castroneves led in the drivers' championship with 86 points, while Chevrolet led the manufacturers' championship.

Before the first practice, all Chevrolet entries were penalized because of unauthorized engine changes. This penalty moved the polesitter, Ryan Briscoe, from starting in the first position down to the 11th spot. Dario Franchitti, in the quickest non-Chevrolet car, started in the first position.

== Classification ==
=== Starting grid ===
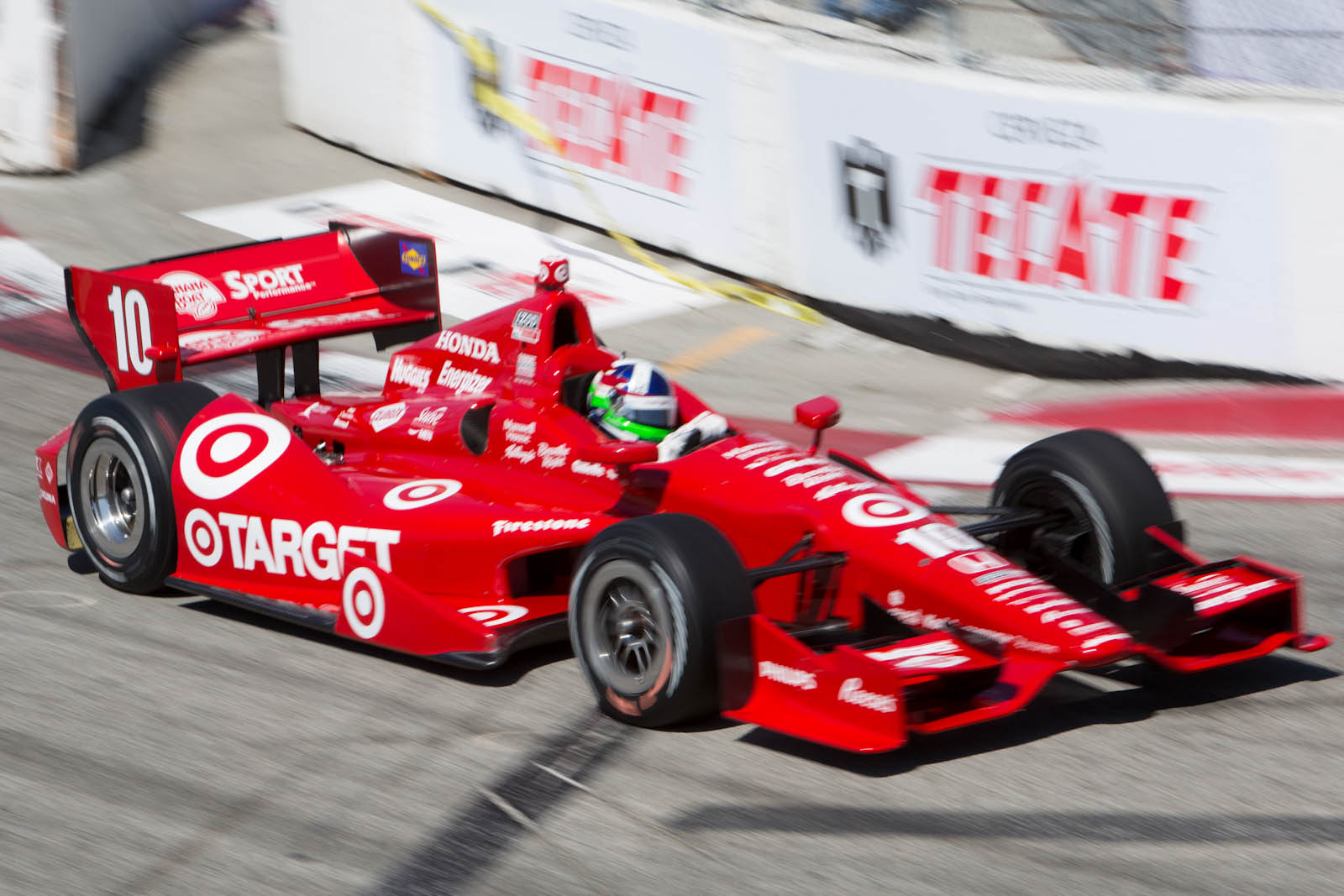
Dario Franchitti started on pole after all Chevrolet-powered cars were penalized 10 grid positions.

Row	Inside		Outside	
1	10	(United Kingdom) Dario Franchitti	67	(United States) Josef Newgarden (R)
2	18	(United Kingdom) Justin Wilson	77	(France) Simon Pagenaud (R)
3	9	(New Zealand) Scott Dixon	15	(Japan) Takuma Sato
4	14	(United Kingdom) Mike Conway	38	(United States) Graham Rahal
5	83	(United States) Charlie Kimball	98	(Canada) Alex Tagliani
6	2	(Australia) Ryan Briscoe^{†}	12	(Australia) Will Power^{†}
7	28	(United States) Ryan Hunter-Reay^{†}	19	(United Kingdom) James Jakes
8	5	(Venezuela) E. J. Viso^{†}	27	(Canada) James Hinchcliffe^{†}
9	78	(Switzerland) Simona de Silvestro	3	(Brazil) Hélio Castroneves^{†}
10	11	(Brazil) Tony Kanaan ^{†}	4	(United States) J. R. Hildebrand ^{†}
11	26	(United States) Marco Andretti ^{†}	8	(Brazil) Rubens Barrichello ^{†}
12	22	(Spain) Oriol Servià ^{†}	20	(United States) Ed Carpenter ^{†}
13	7	(France) Sebastien Bourdais ^{†}	6	(United Kingdom) Katherine Legge (R) ^{†}
^{†} Briscoe, Power, Hunter-Reay, Viso, Hinchcliffe, Castroneves, Kanaan, Hildebrand, Andretti, Barrichello, Servià, Carpenter, Bourdais and Legge penalised 10 places for changing engine

=== Race results ===
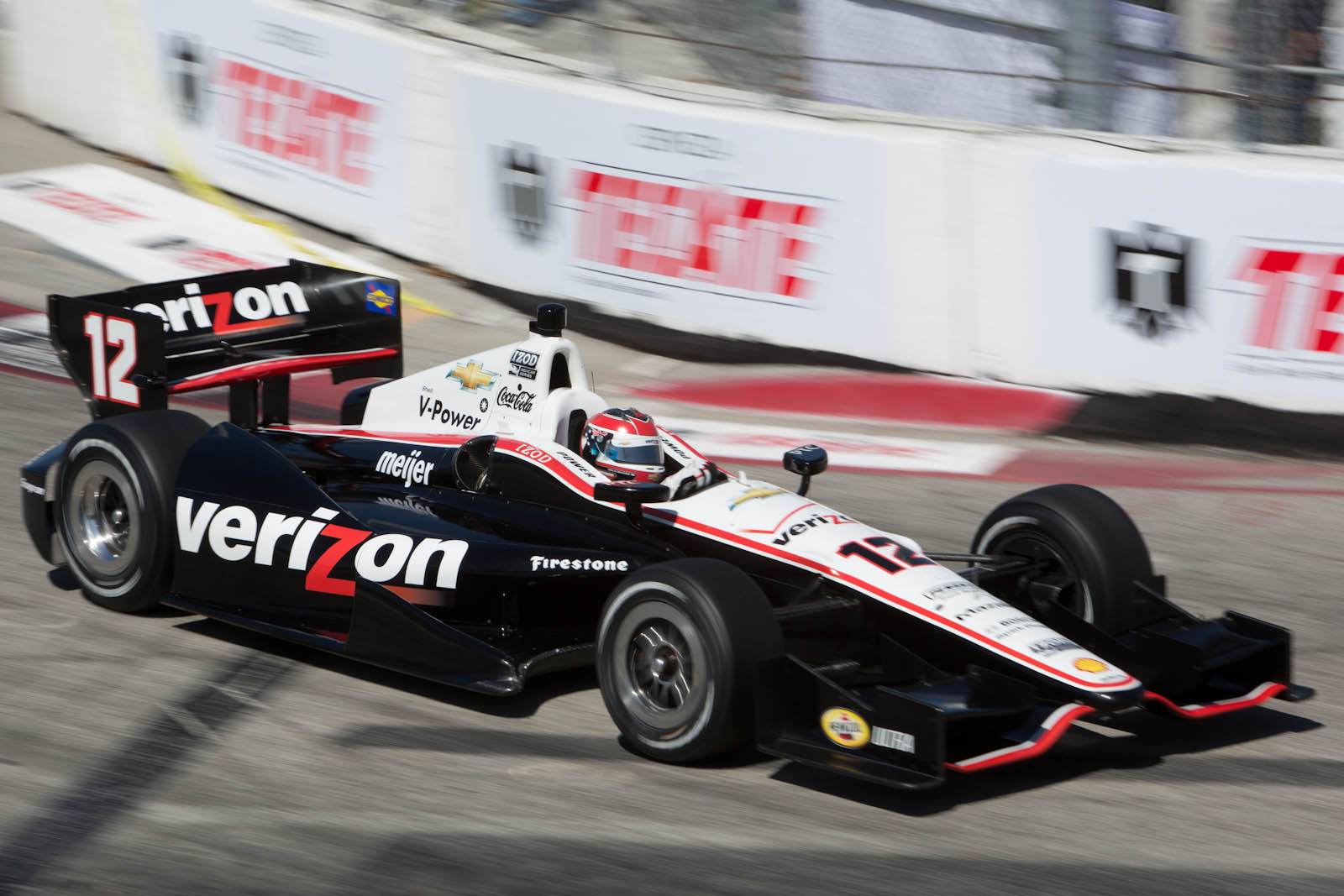
Will Power won his second straight race.

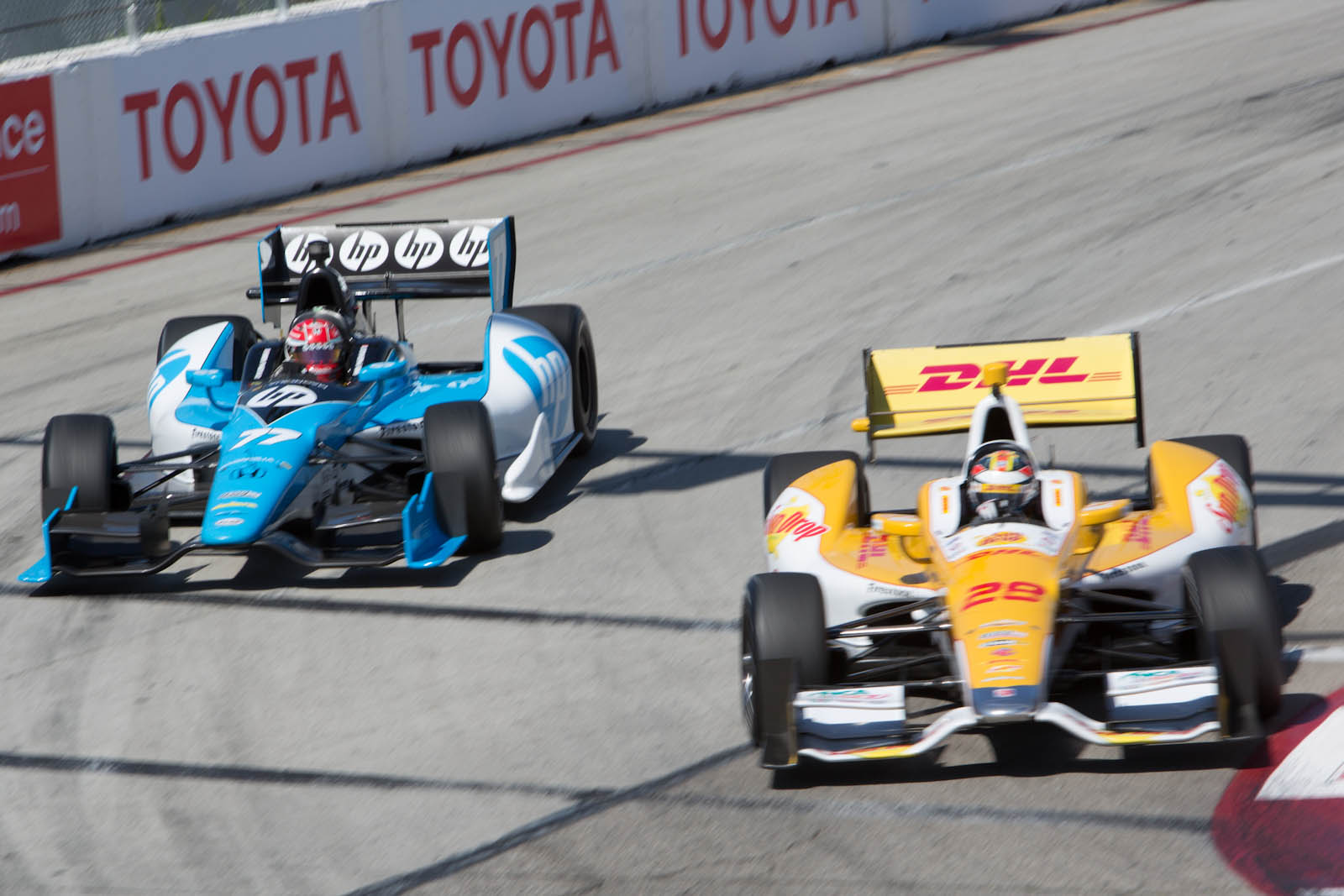
Simon Pagenaud (left) finished second. Ryan Hunter-Reay finished third on the road, but was penalized for avoidable contact.

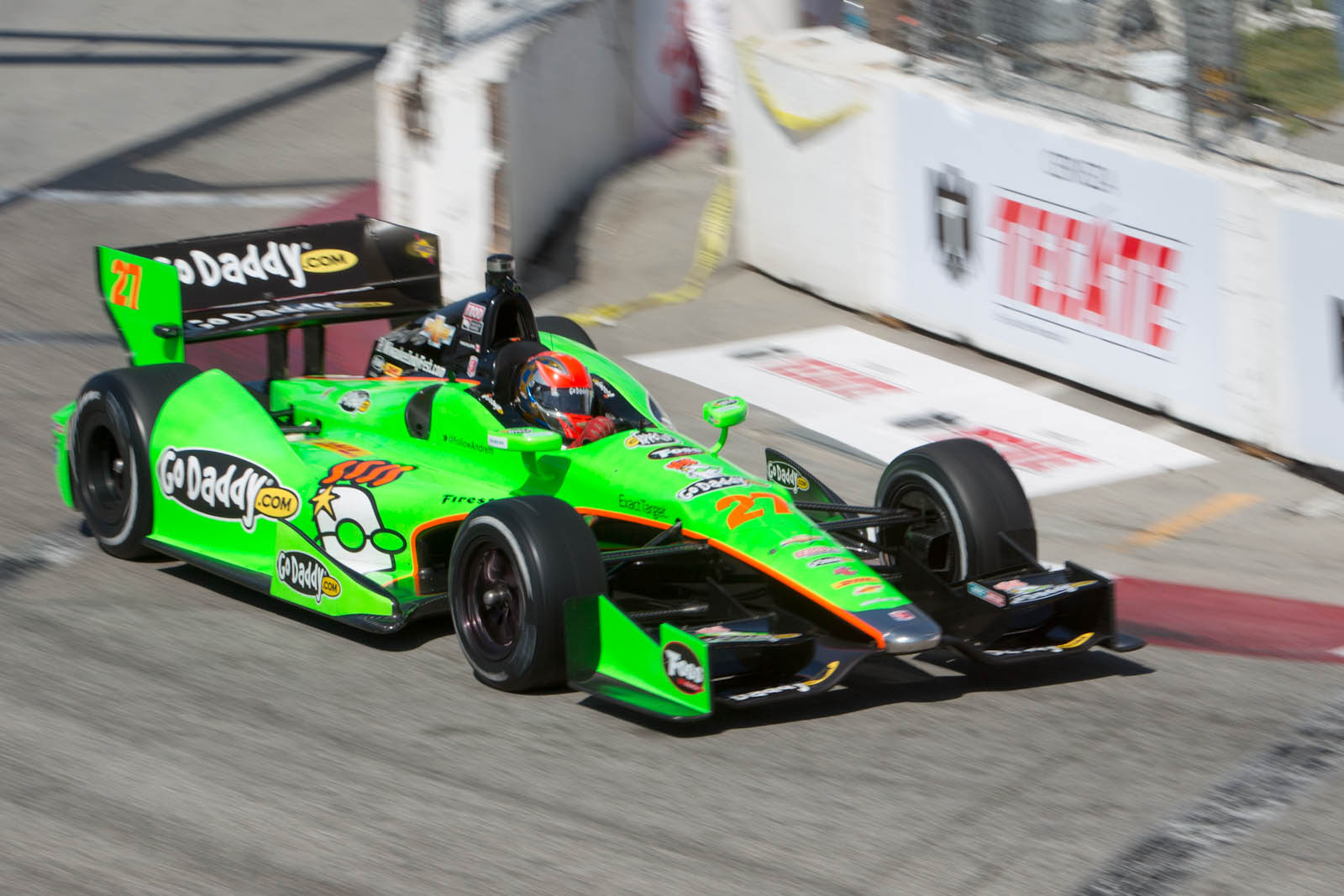
James Hinchcliffe finished third after Hunter-Reay's penalty.

Pos	No.	Driver	Team	Engine	Laps	Time/Retired	Grid	Laps Led	Points^{1}
1	12	(Australia) Will Power	Team Penske	Chevrolet	85	1:54:01.6082	12	15	50
2	77	(France) Simon Pagenaud (R)	Schmidt Hamilton Motorsports	Honda	85	+ 0.8675	4	26	42
3	27	(Canada) James Hinchcliffe	Andretti Autosport	Chevrolet	85	+ 13.2719	16	0	35
4	11	(Brazil) Tony Kanaan	KV Racing Technology	Chevrolet	85	+ 18.1951	19	0	32
5	4	(United States) J. R. Hildebrand	Panther Racing	Chevrolet	85	+ 22.9947	20	0	30
6	28	(United States) Ryan Hunter-Reay	Andretti Autosport	Chevrolet	85	+ 42.5631^{†}	13	4	28
7	2	(Australia) Ryan Briscoe	Team Penske	Chevrolet	85	+ 1:40.1271	11	5	27
8	15	(Japan) Takuma Sato	Rahal Letterman Lanigan Racing	Honda	84	+ 1 lap	6	16	24
9	8	(Brazil) Rubens Barrichello	KV Racing Technology	Chevrolet	84	+ 1 lap	22	0	22
10	18	(United Kingdom) Justin Wilson	Dale Coyne Racing	Honda	84	+ 1 lap	3	15	20
11	19	(United Kingdom) James Jakes	Dale Coyne Racing	Honda	84	+ 1 lap	14	0	19
12	5	(Venezuela) E. J. Viso	KV Racing Technology	Chevrolet	84	+ 1 lap	15	0	18
13	3	(Brazil) Hélio Castroneves	Team Penske	Chevrolet	84	+1 lap^{†}	18	0	17
14	20	(United States) Ed Carpenter	Ed Carpenter Racing	Chevrolet	83	+ 2 laps	24	0	16
15	10	(United Kingdom) Dario Franchitti	Chip Ganassi Racing	Honda	82	+ 3 laps	1	4	15
16	22	(Spain) Oriol Servià	Dreyer & Reinbold Racing	Lotus	82	+ 3 laps	23	0	14
17	7	(France) Sebastien Bourdais	Dragon Racing	Lotus	82	+ 3 laps	25	0	13
18	83	(United States) Charlie Kimball	Chip Ganassi Racing	Honda	80	+ 5 laps	9	0	12
19	6	(United Kingdom) Katherine Legge (R)	Dragon Racing	Lotus	80	+ 5 laps	26	0	12
20	78	(Switzerland) Simona de Silvestro	HVM Racing	Lotus	74	Mechanical	17	0	12
21	98	(Canada) Alex Tagliani	Team Barracuda – BHA	Lotus	46	Mechanical	10	0	12
22	14	(United Kingdom) Mike Conway	A. J. Foyt Enterprises	Honda	41	Mechanical	7	0	12
23	9	(New Zealand) Scott Dixon	Chip Ganassi Racing	Honda	27	Mechanical	5	0	12
24	38	(United States) Graham Rahal	Chip Ganassi Racing	Honda	23	Contact	8	0	12
25	26	(United States) Marco Andretti	Andretti Autosport	Chevrolet	22	Contact	21	0	10
26	67	(United States) Josef Newgarden (R)	Sarah Fisher Hartman Racing	Honda	0	Contact	2	0	10
^{†} Hunter-Reay and Castroneves penalised 30 seconds for avoidable contact

Notes

^{1} Points include 1 point for pole position and 2 points for most laps led.

== Standings after the race ==
Drivers' Championship

Pos	Driver	Points
1	(Australia) Will Power	127
2	(Brazil) Hélio Castroneves	103
3	(France) Simon Pagenaud (R)	100
4	(New Zealand) Scott Dixon	96
5	(Canada) James Hinchcliffe	95

- Note: Only the top five positions are included for the driver standings.

Manufacturers' Championship

Pos	Manufacturer	Points
1	(United States) Chevrolet	27
2	(Japan) Honda	18
3	(United Kingdom) Lotus	12

== See also ==
- 2012 American Le Mans Series at Long Beach

Previous race: 2012 Indy Grand Prix of Alabama	IndyCar Series; 2012 season	Next race: 2012 São Paulo Indy 300
Previous race: 2011 Toyota Grand Prix of Long Beach	Toyota Grand Prix of Long Beach	Next race: 2013 Toyota Grand Prix of Long Beach
