= AFS Racing =

Racing team

(United States) AFS Racing
- Founder(s): Gary Peterson
- Base: Huntington Beach, California, United States
- Former series: Indy Lights; Indycar Series
- Teams' Championships: Indy Lights: 2008, 2009
- Drivers' Championships: Indy Lights: 2008: Raphael Matos; 2009: J. R. Hildebrand

AFS Racing is a professional racing team participating in the IndyCar Series and previously the Firestone Indy Lights series. It is owned by Gary Peterson, the founder of Automatic Fire Sprinklers for which it is named, and is based in Huntington Beach, California.

== Indy Lights ==
The team was founded with the creation of the Infiniti Pro Series (now Indy Lights) in 2002. At that time the team's only driver was Peterson himself and he finished seventh in points with a best finish of fourth. In 2003 Peterson was joined by G. J. Mennen who made 7 starts and finished 13th in points. Peterson finished 10th. In 2004, Peterson only drove part-time but the team ran a second car for Arie Luyendyk Jr. for the final five races of the season after he left Sam Schmidt Motorsports. Luyendyk finished third in points. The team also fielded a car for sprint car racer Jay Drake in the Freedom 100 and he finished fourth. In 2005, the team ran only a partial schedule, fielding a car for Luyendyk in three races and Rocky Moran Jr. in the Freedom 100. In 2006 Alex Lloyd finished 7th in the team's primary entry while Luyendyk drove in four races and Thiago Medeiros, Phil Giebler, and Tyce Carlson all drove in one race each for the team. Lloyd captured the team's first two wins that season with victories in the Freedom 100 and the second Infineon Raceway race.

In 2007 the team formed a partnership with Andretti Green Racing and fielded cars full-time for Jaime Camara and Wade Cunningham. The partnership was often referred to as AGR-AFS Racing Cunningham finished third in points with a win at Watkins Glen International while Camara finished sixth in points. In 2008 the team fielded full-time entries for reigning Atlantic Championship champion Raphael Matos and Arie Luyendyk Jr. Matos won three races on his way to the series championship while Luyendyk finished fourth in points and captured his first series win in the season finale at Chicagoland Speedway. 2009 saw the team field entries for J. R. Hildebrand and Sebastián Saavedra. Hildebrand captured AGR-AFS's second consecutive championship on the back of four race wins while Saavedra won twice and finished third in points, winning Rookie of the Year honors. The team's 2010 drivers were Martin Plowman and Charlie Kimball. Plowman captured a win at the Mid-Ohio Sports Car Course and finished third in points while Kimball failed to win and got fourth.

== IndyCar Series ==
The team first entered the IndyCar Series in 2009 by fielding a car in conjunction with Andretti Green Racing at Infineon Raceway for Franck Montagny. In 2010 the partnership participated in two road course races with driver Adam Carroll, finishing 16th and 19th.

In 2011 the team has separated from Andretti and is now on its own. It began the 2011 season only operating in the IndyCar Series with a single part-time entry driven by Raphael Matos. After failing to qualify for the 2011 Indianapolis 500, Matos and the team parted ways. They signed former AFS Indy Lights driver Martin Plowman to a three race deal in association with Sam Schmidt Motorsports, AFS's former Indy Lights rival. Hideki Mutoh was signed to drive the team's car at Twin Ring Motegi. Wade Cunningham, who earlier in the season debuted driving an in-house Schmidt Motorsports car, will drive in the season's final two oval races for the team. AFS Racing fielded a car in conjunction with Andretti Autosport at the 2012 Indianapolis 500 which was driven by Sebastián Saavedra. Unfortunately, Saavedra crashed and finished 26th. AFS Racing and Saavedra returned to race at Infineon Raceway for the GoPro Indy Grand Prix of Sonoma, where Saavedra finished 15th.

AFS spent the 2013 season away from IndyCar. It returned in 2014, this time partnered with KV Racing Technology, with a full-season entry for Saavedra.

== Racing results ==
=== Complete IndyCar Series results ===
(key)

Year	Chassis	Engine	Drivers	No.	1	2	3	4	5	6	7	8	9	10	11	12	13	14	15	16	17	18
2009					STP	LBH	KAN	INDY	MIL	TXS	IOW	RIR	WGL	TOR	EDM	KTY	MOH	SNM	CHI	MOT	HMS	
2009	Dallara IR-05	Honda HI7R V8	(France) Franck Montagny (R)	25														20^{1}				
2010					SAO	STP	ALA	LBH	KAN	INDY	TXS	IOW	WGL	TOR	EDM	MOH	SNM	CHI	KTY	MOT	HMS	
2010	Dallara IR-05	Honda HI7R V8	(United Kingdom) Adam Carroll (R)^{1}	27										16			19					
2011					STP	ALA	LBH	SAO	INDY	TXS		MIL	IOW	TOR	EDM	MOH	NHA	SNM	BAL	MOT	KTY	LSV
2011	Dallara IR5	Honda HI11R V8	(Brazil) Raphael Matos	17	7	20	11	25	DNQ													
2011	Dallara IR5	Honda HI11R V8	(United Kingdom) Martin Plowman (R)^{2}	17												18		12	11			
2011	Dallara IR5	Honda HI11R V8	(Japan) Hideki Mutoh^{2}	17																18		
2011	Dallara IR5	Honda HI11R V8	(Australia) Wade Cunningham (R)^{2}	17																	7	C^{3}
2012^{1}					STP	ALA	LBH	SAO	INDY	DET	TEX	MIL	IOW	TOR	EDM	MOH	SNM	BAL	FON			
2012^{1}	Dallara DW12	Chevrolet IndyCar V6t	(Colombia) Sebastián Saavedra	17					26								15		21			
2014^{4}					STP	LBH	ALA	IMS	INDY	DET	DET	TXS	HOU	HOU	POC	IOW	TOR	TOR	MOH	MIL	SON	FON
2014^{4}	Dallara DW12	Chevrolet IndyCar V6t	(Colombia) Sebastián Saavedra	17	11	9	18	23	15	14	22	17	15	17	15	17	19	21	20	18	16	17
2015^{5}					STP	NOL	LBH	ALA	IMS	INDY	DET		TXS	TOR	FON	MIL	IOW	MOH	POC	SNM		
2015^{5}	Dallara DW12	Chevrolet IndyCar V6t	(Colombia) Sebastián Saavedra	8			10		17					16						13		
2015^{5}	Dallara DW12	Chevrolet IndyCar V6t	(Colombia) Sebastián Saavedra	17						23												
2017^{6}					STP	LBH	ALA	PHX	IMS	INDY	DET		TEX	ROA	IOW	TOR	MOH	POC	GAT	WGL	SNM	
2017^{6}	Dallara DW12	Chevrolet IndyCar V6t	(Colombia) Sebastián Saavedra	17						15												
2018^{7}					STP	PHX	LBH	ALA	IMS	INDY	DET		TEX	ROA	IOW	TOR	MOH	POC	GAT	POR	SNM	
2018^{7}	Dallara DW12	Honda HI18TT V6t	(United Kingdom) Jay Howard	7						24												

1. In conjunction with Andretti Autosport.
2. In conjunction with Sam Schmidt Motorsports.
3. The final race at Las Vegas was canceled due to Dan Wheldon's death.
4. In conjunction with KV Racing Technology.
5. In conjunction with Chip Ganassi Racing.
6. In conjunction with Juncos Racing.
7. In conjunction with Schmidt Peterson Motorsports.
