= Martin Plowman =

British racing driver

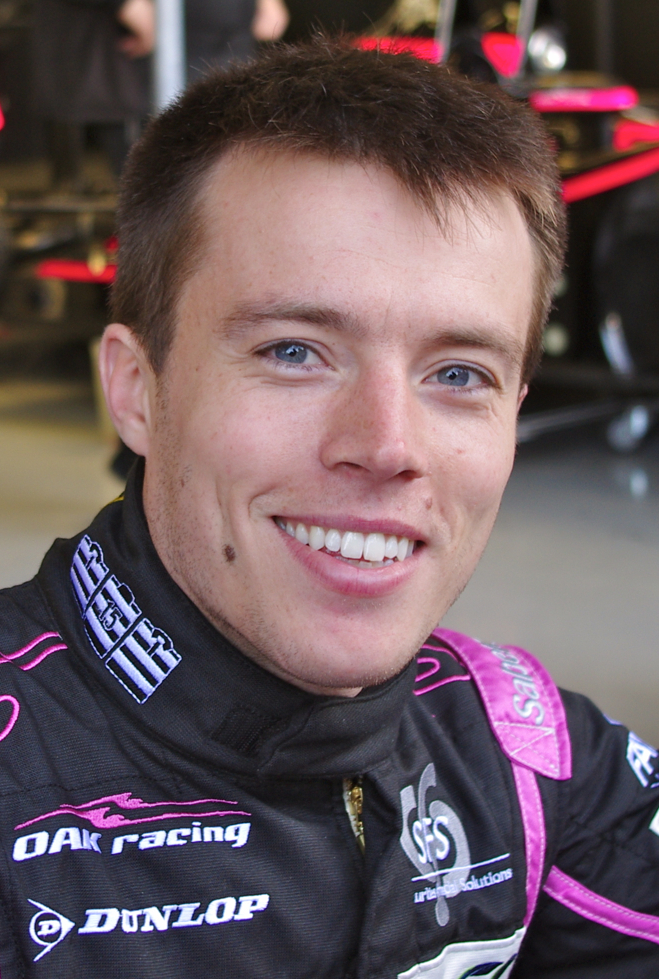
- Plowman at the 2013 6 Hours of Silverstone
- Nationality: (United Kingdom) British
- Born: 3 October 1987 (age 39) Tamworth, Staffordshire, England

British GT career
- Debut season: 2015
- Current team: Paddock Motorsport
- Categorisation: FIA Gold (until 2014, 2019–2024); FIA Platinum (2015–2018); FIA Silver (2025–)
- Car number: 11

Previous series
- 2013 2012 2011 2009–10 2008 2006–07 2006–07: FIA WEC; American Le Mans Series; IndyCar Series; Firestone Indy Lights; Formula Three Euroseries; Formula Renault 2.0 Italia; Formula Renault Eurocup

Championship titles
- 2013 2019: FIA WEC LMP2 class 2019 British GT Championship GT4 Pro-Am Class

Martin James Plowman (born 3 October 1987) is a British professional racing driver from Tamworth currently competing in the British GT Championship for Paddock Motorsport, which he co-founded with Kelvin Fletcher. In 2013, he won the 24 Hours of Le Mans in the LMP2 class and was 2013 FIA WEC World Champion in the LMP2 class for drivers and teams.

== Racing career ==
=== Early career ===
After several extremely successful years in karting, Toyota signed Plowman to a ten-year contract to their young driver program. He made his professional debut in 2006 driving in Italian Formula Renault for Prema Powerteam, finishing fifth in the Italian Series, claiming rookie of the year.

Plowman returned to the same team and series in 2007, finishing joint seventh with Team-Mate Henkie Waldscmidt in Italian Formula Renault, a disappointing end to the campaign for the Prema Powerteam after holding 1–2 in the championship halfway through the season. Plowman was dropped from the Toyota young driver program at the end of 2007.

In 2008, Plowman became an official Volkswagen junior driver where he was assigned to the newly re-formed RC Motorsport team and drove in the first seven rounds (fourteen races) of the Formula Three Euroseries where he failed to score any points and only managed a best finish of seventeenth. He also drove in the Masters of Formula 3 with Signature-Plus where he finished fourteenth.

=== Indy Lights ===
In 2009, Plowman signed to drive for Panther Racing in the American Firestone Indy Lights series, the feeder series to IndyCars. Martin finished eleventh in the points standings in his inaugural season with Panther Racing, while achieving two top five finishes and eight top-ten finishes.

After the 2009 season, Martin signed on board with AFS-Andretti Autosport to compete with teammate Charlie Kimball in the 2010 Indy Lights season. Plowman won from the pole to capture his first victory at the Mid-Ohio Sports Car Course. He captured another pole two races later at Chicagoland Speedway but was knocked after making contact with former teammate Pippa Mann while leading the race. He finished third in the championship, one spot ahead of Kimball.

=== IndyCar Series ===
In 2011, Plowman made his IndyCar Series debut with Sam Schmidt Motorsports as a part of their partnership with AFS Racing. Plowman competed in the events at Mid-Ohio Sports Car Course, Infineon Raceway, and the Baltimore Grand Prix, driving the No. 17 car featuring the logo of Snowball Express, a volunteer organisation created to assist the children of military personnel who have died while on active duty since the 9/11 attacks. In each event, Plowman improved upon his starting position and upon his previous results, culminating in a near top-ten finish at the Baltimore Grand Prix. In the off-season, he has continued his involvement with Snowball Express, speaking to military families and touring with a show car.

=== American LeMans Series ===
On 24 February 2012, the Conquest Endurance racing team announced Plowman, David Heinemeier Hansson, and Francesco Dracone as co-drivers for the team's brand new entry in the LMP2 division of the American LeMans Series for the 2012 season. The No. 37 Judd-powered, Morgan-badged car debuted at the 60th Anniversary running of the 12 Hours of Sebring on 17 March 2012. The team finished third in the ALMS P2 class (44th overall), despite having to replace Dracone with Jan Heylen just twelve hours before the race due to illness. On 10 April 2012, the team announced a partnership with Nissan North America to supply engines for the No. 37 car for the remainder of the season, beginning at the Toyota Grand Prix of Long Beach. Plowman and Heinemeier Hansson achieved their first P2 class pole and victory (third place overall) at the Grand Prix of Mosport on 22 July 2012. This was also the first victory for the Conquest Endurance team in ALMS competition.

=== FIA World Endurance Championship ===
After the 2012 season, Conquest Endurance ended its participation in the ALMS.

2013 season

For 2013, Plowman and his Conquest co-driver Heinemeier Hansson were both hired by OAK Racing to drive Morgan-Nissans in the LMP2 class on the FIA World Endurance Championship. Plowman shared the number 35 entry with co-drivers Bertrand Baguette and Ricardo González.

The 2013 season started at the 6 Hours of Silverstone, the OAK Racing Morgan LMP2-Nissan No. 35 finished in fourth place (twelfth overall), to get their first ten points for the World Championship.

On the 6 Hours of Spa-Francorchamps, González, Baguette and Plowman finished in third position (for cars registered for points in the FIA World Endurance Championship), of LMP2 class (eleventh overall).

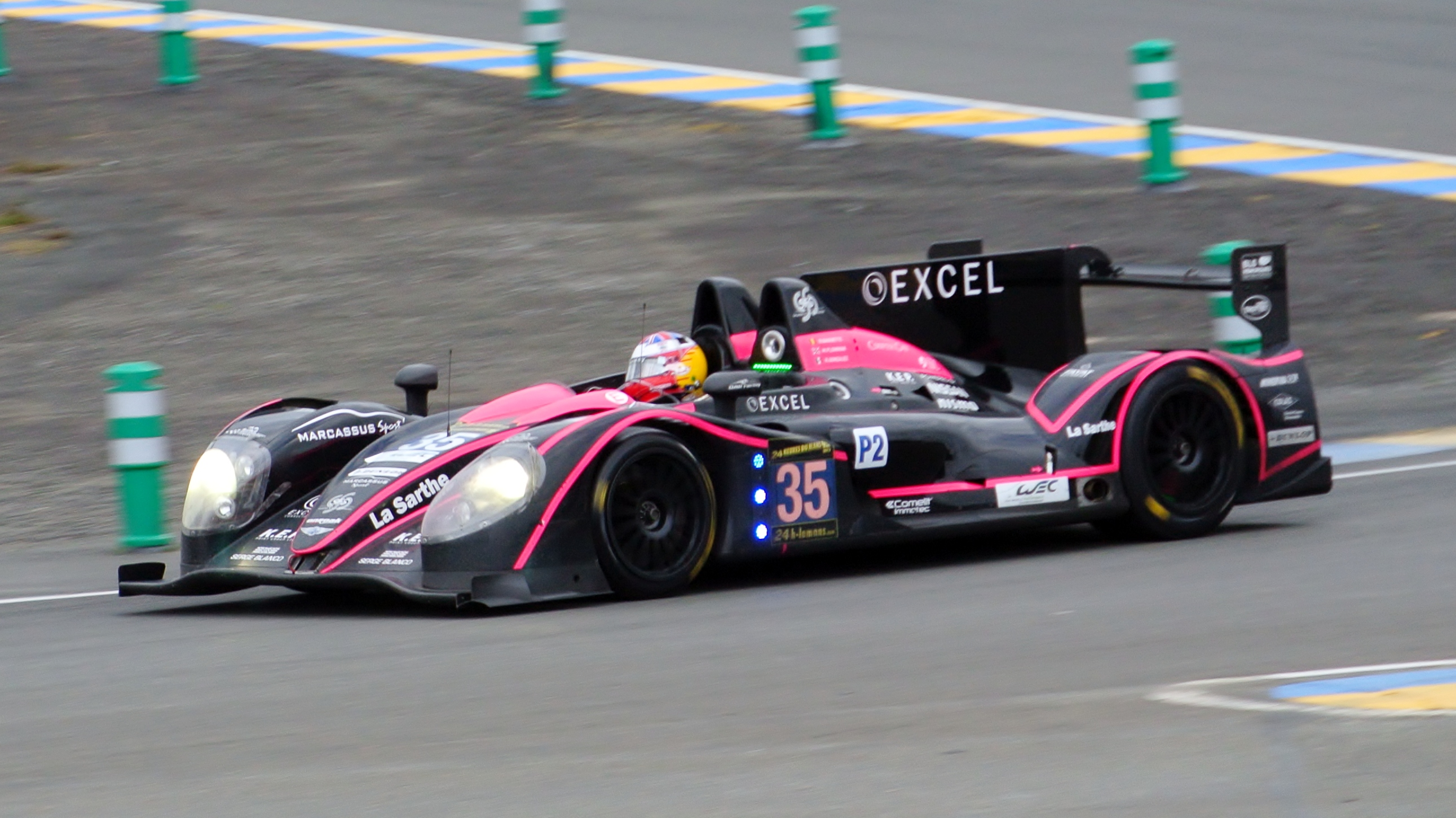
Plowman winner of 2013 24 Hours of Le Mans edition.

In 2013, Plowman and his co-drivers Ricardo González and Bertrand Baguette from OAK Racing Morgan LMP2-Nissan team, won the 81st edition of the 24 Hours of Le Mans in LMP2 class (seventh overall). Their Morgan LMP2 covered a total of 329 laps in the Circuit de la Sarthe. The race was run in very difficult weather conditions and several serious accidents bringing out a record of twelve safety car caution periods.

The 6 Hours of São Paulo were held at the Autódromo José Carlos Pace, on 30 August – 1 September. González, Baguette and Plowman got the second place of LMP2 category, only behind Oreca 03-Nissan team (Rusinov, Martin and Conway). With this result the British driver got his second podium of the year.

In the fifth round of 2013 season were the 6 Hours of Circuit of the Americas in Austin, Texas on 20–22 September. González, Baguette and Plowman obtained the seventh place of LMP2 category (eleventh overall).

On 18–20 October, in the 6 hours of Fuji, following a two-hour delay the race was restarted once more under the safety car, lapping another eight circuits before officials stopped the race again and eventually called an end to the event. The No. 35 OAK Morgan-Nissan (Baguette, González and Plowman), started in the pole position and was declared the race winner of LMP2 class (fourth overall), in the same position they started. Due to difficult weather conditions, half points would be awarded for all the teams and drivers in the event.

During the 6 Hours of Shanghai on 8–9 November, the No. 35 OAK Morgan-Nissan trio (Baguette, González and Plowman), qualified in fourth position and finished in third place (7th overall). With this new podium the French team extend their lead on 15 points to the final race of the championship.

On the last race of the season the 6 Hours of Bahrain on 29–30 November, González, Baguette and Plowman qualified in sixth place and finished in fourth position (sixth overall). Therefore, Plowman won the 2013 FIA WEC World Championship for drivers and teams in LMP2 class.

=== British GT ===
Plowman first raced in British GT in 2015. In 2017, he joined the series full-time, partnering Kelvin Fletcher in a Nissan GT4, who has remained his co-driver ever since. Plowman and Fletcher won the GT4 Pro-Am title in 2019, before sitting out the 2020 season due to the coronavirus pandemic.

In 2021, the pair returned with JRM but then switched to Paddock Motorsport, a team founded by Plowman and Fletcher, already competing in the BRSCC's Mazda MX5 Championship and the GT Cup Championship. With Plowman being both driver and team principal, the team expanded in 2022 to run cars in both GT3 and GT4.

In the Oulton Park round of the 2022 season, Plowman and Fletcher took their first overall win in British GT; the Paddock Motorsport team would also manage their first GT4 win in the season finale at Donington Park as Moh Ritson and Kavi Jundu won the GT4 Pro-Am class.

== Racing record ==
=== Complete Eurocup Formula Renault 2.0 results ===
(key) (Races in bold indicate pole position; races in italics indicate fastest lap)

Year	Entrant	1	2	3	4	5	6	7	8	9	10	11	12	13	14	DC	Points
2006	Prema Powerteam	ZOL; 1; 22	ZOL; 2; 17	IST; 1; 22	IST; 2 Ret	MIS; 1 NC	MIS; 2; 23	NÜR; 1; 21	NÜR; 2; 35	DON; 1; 16	DON; 2; 11	LMS; 1; 21	LMS; 2; 10	CAT; 1; 9	CAT; 2; 24	23rd	7
2007	Prema Powerteam	ZOL; 1; 29†	ZOL; 2 Ret	NÜR; 1; 31	NÜR; 2; 13	HUN; 1; 18	HUN; 2; 20	DON; 1; 17	DON; 2 Ret	MAG; 1; 18	MAG; 2; 12	EST; 1; 19	EST; 2; 16	CAT; 1; 12	CAT; 2; 19	26th	1

=== Complete Formula 3 Euro Series results ===
(key)

Year	Entrant	Chassis	Engine	1	2	3	4	5	6	7	8	9	10	11	12	13	14	15	16	17	18	19	20	DC	Points
2008	RC Motorsport	Dallara F308/051	Volkswagen	HOC; 1; 17	HOC; 2 Ret	MUG; 1 Ret	MUG; 2; 23	PAU; 1 Ret	PAU; 2 Ret	NOR; 1 Ret	NOR; 2 Ret	ZAN; 1; 20	ZAN; 2; 17	NÜR; 1; 17	NÜR; 2; 21	BRH; 1; 18	BRH; 2; 22	CAT; 1	CAT; 2	LMS; 1	LMS; 2	HOC; 1	HOC; 2	31st	0

=== American open–wheel racing results ===
(key) (Races in bold indicate pole position) (Races in italics indicate fastest lap)

==== Indy Lights results ====
Year	Team	1	2	3	4	5	6	7	8	9	10	11	12	13	14	15	Rank	Points	Ref
2009	Panther Racing	STP; 15	STP; 16	LBH; 15	KAN; 5	INDY; 22	MIL; 15	IOW; 8	WGL; 10	TOR; 12	EDM; 13	KTY; 9	MOH; 5	SNM; 10	CHI; 8	HMS; 7	**11th**	**298**	
2010	AFS Racing Andretti Autosport	STP; 6	ALA; 4	LBH; 5	INDY; 5	IOW; 2	WGL; 4	TOR; 7	EDM; 3	**MOH**; 1	SNM; 16	**CHI**; 13	KTY; 7	HMS; 6			**3rd**	**392**	

==== IndyCar Series ====
Year	Team	No.	Chassis	Engine	1	2	3	4	5	6	7	8	9	10	11	12	13	14	15	16	17	18	Rank	Points	Ref
2011	Sam Schmidt Motorsports	17	Dallara IR-05	Honda	STP	ALA	LBH	SAO	INDY	TXS	TXS	MIL	IOW	TOR	EDM	MOH; 18	NHM	SNM; 12	BAL; 11	MOT	KTY	LVS^{1} C	33rd	49	
2014	A. J. Foyt Enterprises	41	Dallara DW12	Honda	STP	LBH	ALA	IMS; 18	INDY; 23	DET	DET	TXS	HOU	HOU	POC	IOW	TOR	TOR	MOH	MIL	SNM	FON	34th	18	

^{1} The Las Vegas Indy 300 was abandoned after Dan Wheldon died from injuries sustained in a 15-car crash on lap 11.

==== Indianapolis 500 ====
Year	Chassis	Engine	Start	Finish	Team
2014	Dallara	Honda	32	23	A. J. Foyt Enterprises

=== Complete American Le Mans Series results ===
(key) (Races in bold indicate pole position) (Races in italics indicate fastest lap)

Year	Entrant	Class	Chassis	Engine	1	2	3	4	5	6	7	8	9	10	Rank	Points	Ref
2012	Conquest Endurance	P2	Morgan LMP2	Nissan VK45DE 4.5 L V8	SEB; 9	LBH; 2	MON; 2	LIM; 2	MOS; 1	MID; 2	AME; 1	BAL; Ret	VIR; 2	PET; DSQ	2nd	156	

=== Complete FIA World Endurance Championship results ===
(key) (Races in bold indicate pole position) (Races in italics indicate fastest lap)

Year	Team	Class	Car	Engine	1	2	3	4	5	6	7	8	Rank	Points
2013	OAK Racing	LMP2	Morgan LMP2	Nissan VK45DE 4.5 L V8	SIL; 4	SPA; 3	LMS; 1	SÃO; 2	COA; 7	**FUJ**; 1	SHA; 3	BHR; 4	1st	141.5

=== 24 Hours of Le Mans results ===
Year	Team	Co-Drivers	Car	Class	Laps	Pos.	Class Pos.
2013	(France) OAK Racing	(Belgium) Bertrand Baguette (Mexico) Ricardo González	Morgan LMP2-Nissan	LMP2	329	7th	**1st**

=== Complete British GT Championship results ===
(key) (Races in bold indicate pole position) (Races in italics indicate fastest lap)

Year	Team	Car	Class	1	2	3	4	5	6	7	8	9	10	DC	Points
2015	UltraTek Racing	Lotus Evora GT4	GT4	OUL; 1; 22	OUL; 2; 21	ROC; 1	SIL; 1	SPA; 1	BRH; 1	SNE; 1	SNE; 2	DON; 1		28th	1
2016	Stratton Motorsport	Lotus Evora GT4	GT4	BRH; 1	ROC; 1	OUL; 1	OUL; 2	SIL; 1	SPA; 1	SNE; 1 Ret	SNE; 2 Ret	DON; 1 Ret		NC	0
2017	Team RJN Nissan with UltraTek	Nissan 370Z GT4	GT4	OUL; 1; 24	OUL; 2; 16	ROC; 1; 20	SNE; 1; 21	SNE; 2; 20	SIL; 1 Ret	SPA; 1; 18	SPA; 2; 20	BRH; 1; 25	DON; 1 Ret	20th	17.5
2018	UltraTek Racing / Team RJN	Nissan 370Z GT4	GT4	OUL; 1; 32	OUL; 2; 17	ROC; 1; 13	SNE; 1; 22	SNE; 2; 22	SIL; 1; 19	SPA; 1; 20	BRH; 1; 10	DON; 1 Ret		9th	65.5
2019	Beechdean AMR	Aston Martin Vantage GT4	GT4	OUL; 1; 18	OUL; 2; 17	SNE; 1; 21	SNE; 2; 19	SIL; 1; 14	DON; 1; 20	SPA; 1; 23	BRH; 1; 17	DON; 1; 15		5th	98.5
2021	JRM Racing	Bentley Continental GT3	GT3	BRH; 1; 7										11th	59.5
2021	Paddock Motorsport	Bentley Continental GT3	GT3		SIL; 1; 25	DON; 1; 7	SPA; 1	SNE; 1; 2	SNE; 2; 8	**OUL**; **1**; 9	OUL; 2; 9	DON; 1; 10		11th	59.5
2022	Paddock Motorsport	McLaren 720S GT3	GT3	OUL; 1; 15	OUL; 2; 3	SIL; 1; 9	DON; 1; 11	SNE; 1; 15	SNE; 2; 15	SPA; 1; 7	BRH; 1; 21	DON; 1 Ret		17th	36
2023	Paddock Motorsport	McLaren 720S GT3	GT3	OUL; 1; 9	OUL; 2; 8	SIL; 1; 17	DON; 1; 10	SNE; 1; 12	SNE; 2; 10	ALG; 1; 12	BRH; 1; 9	DON; 1; 9		20th	14.5
2024	Paddock Motorsport	McLaren 720S GT3 Evo	GT3	OUL; 1; 16	OUL; 2; 11	SIL; 1; 11	DON; 1; 15	SPA; 1; 11	SNE; 1; 13	SNE; 2; 11	DON; 1; 8	BRH; 1; 11		17th	13
2025	Paddock Motorsport	McLaren 720S GT3 Evo	GT3	DON; 1; 8	SIL; 1; 8	OUL; 1; 11	OUL; 2; 7	SPA; 1; 8	SNE; 1; 5	SNE; 2; 9	BRH; 1; 9	DON; 1; 10		11th	45
2026	Paddock Motorsport	McLaren 720S GT3 Evo	GT3	SIL; 1; 9	OUL; 1; 4	OUL; 2; 21	SPA; 1; 8	SNE; 1 Ret	SNE; 2; 22	DON; 1	BRH; 1; 9			12th	33

=== Complete Blancpain GT Series Sprint Cup results ===
Year	Team	Car	Class	1	2	3	4	5	6	7	8	9	10	Pos.	Points	Ref
2016	Garage 59	McLaren 650S GT3	Pro	MIS; QR; Ret	MIS; CR; 26	BRH; QR; 32	BRH; CR; 25	NÜR; QR; Ret	NÜR; CR; Ret	HUN; QR; 23	HUN; CR; Ret	CAT; QR; 19	CAT; CR; 21	NC	0	

Sporting positions
Preceded by Inaugural	FIA Endurance Trophy for LMP2 Drivers; Champion; 2013; With: Bertrand Baguette & Ricardo González	Succeeded by Sergey Zlobin
Preceded by Scott Malvern; Nick Jones	British GT Championship; GT4 Pro-Am Champion; 2019; With: Kelvin Fletcher	Succeeded by Mia Flewitt; Euan Hankey
