= Carlos Huertas =

Colombian racing driver (born 1991)

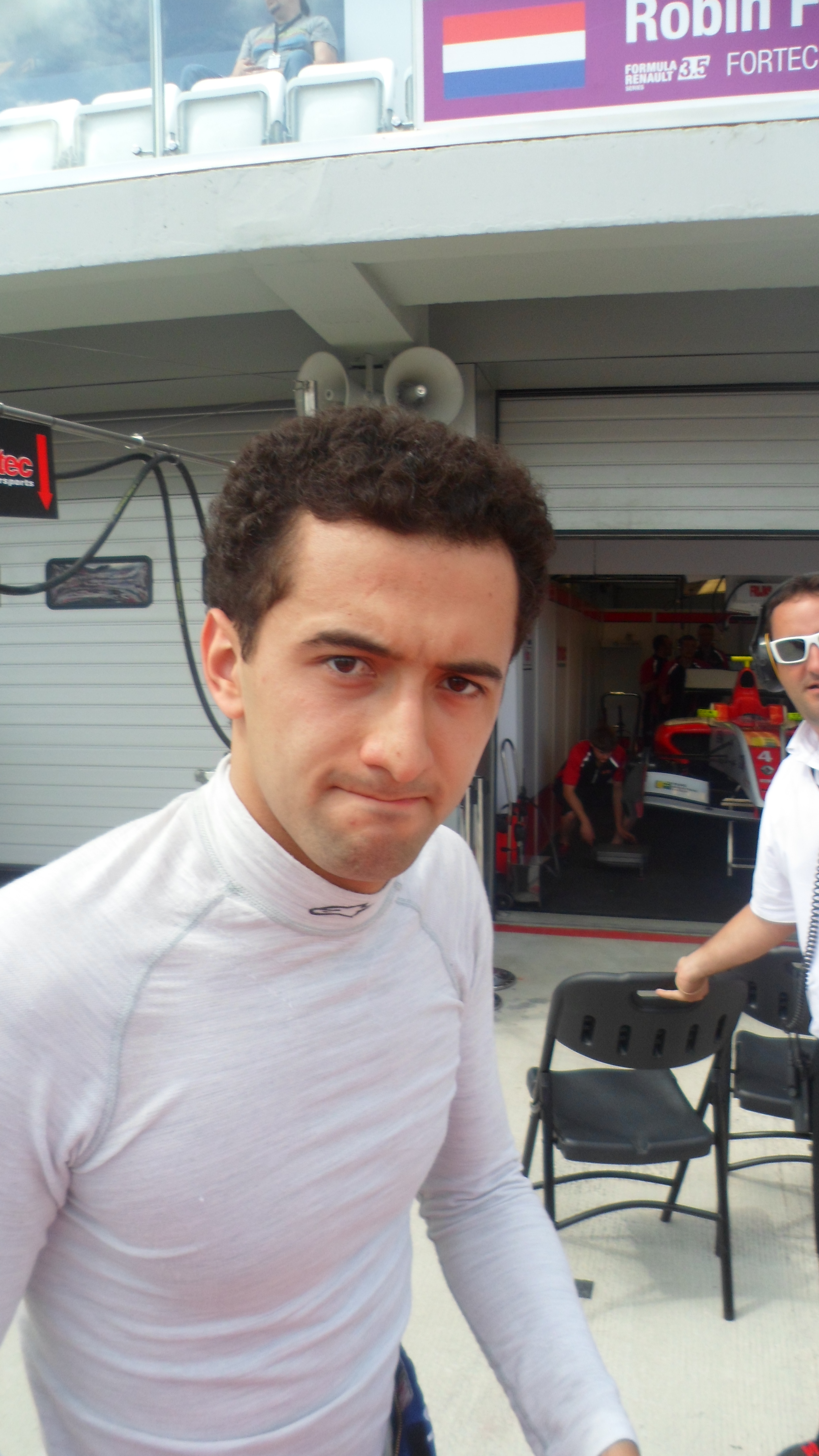
- Huertas in 2012
- Nationality: (Colombia) Colombian
- Born: 22 June 1991 (age 35) Bogotá, Colombia

IndyCar Series career
- Debut season: 2014
- Teams: Dale Coyne Racing
- Car number: 18
- Starts: 21
- Wins: 1
- Poles: 0
- Fastest laps: 0
- Best finish: 20th in 2014

Previous series
- 2012–2013 2009–11 2008 2007: Formula Renault 3.5 Series; British Formula 3 Formula BMW Europe; Formula BMW UK

Carlos Huertas (born 22 June 1991) is a Colombian former racing driver. He has previously competed in the IndyCar Series, Formula Renault 3.5, and the British Formula 3 Championship.

== Racing career ==
Born in Bogotá, Huertas began his career in Formula BMW UK in 2007 with Räikkönen Robertson Racing where he finished thirteenth. He finished fifth in the World Final race. In 2008, he returned to Räikkönen Robertson but moved to the FBMW Europe series. He finished ninth in the championship. In 2009, he moved to the British Formula 3 Championship with Räikkönen Robertson and finished seventh in points with two podium finishes. He also finished twelfth in the Macau Grand Prix. He returned to British F3 and Räikkönen Robertson in 2010 but dropped to tenth in points, but recorded four podium finishes. In 2011, he remained for a third year in British F3 but switched teams to Carlin Motorsport. Huertas improved to third in the championship points and captured his first series win.

2012 saw Huertas move to Formula Renault 3.5 with Fortec Motorsports. He finished sixteenth in points with a best finish of fourth in the season opener. Huertas switched teams to Carlin in 2013 and improved to 14th in points and captured his first win at Ciudad del Motor de Aragón. It was announced that he would test an IndyCar Series car for Panther Racing in 2014. He was later announced as a driver with Dale Coyne Racing.

Huertas won his first race in a very eventful 2014 Grand Prix of Houston by running more laps in one stint than anybody else. Four days later, the car was found to have an illegally large fuel tank as well as a rear wing infringement. Huertas and the team were each fined $5,000, but the win stood.

Huertas withdrew from the 2015 Indianapolis 500 race due to an inner ear infection and has not competed in IndyCar since.

== Racing record ==
=== Complete Formula Renault 3.5 Series results ===
(key) (Races in italics indicate fastest lap)

Year	Team	1	2	3	4	5	6	7	8	9	10	11	12	13	14	15	16	17	Pos	Points
2012	Fortec Motorsports	ALC; 1; 4	ALC; 2; 12	MON; 1; 10	SPA; 1 Ret	SPA; 2 Ret	NÜR; 1; 23†	NÜR; 2 Ret	MSC; 1 Ret	MSC; 2; 6	SIL; 1; 6	SIL; 2; 11	HUN; 1; 7	HUN; 2; 12	LEC; 1; 15	LEC; 2; 15	CAT; 1; 18	CAT; 2; 18	16th	35
2013	Carlin Motorsport	MNZ; 1; 16	MNZ; 2; 16	ALC; 1; 20	ALC; 2; 1	MON; 1; 15	SPA; 1; 10	SPA; 2 Ret	MSC; 1; 15	MSC; 2; 19	RBR; 1 Ret	RBR; 2 Ret	HUN; 1; 17	HUN; 2; 8	LEC; 1 Ret	LEC; 2; 18	CAT; 1 Ret	CAT; 2; 18	14th	30

=== IndyCar Series ===
Year	Team	No.	Chassis	Engine	1	2	3	4	5	6	7	8	9	10	11	12	13	14	15	16	17	18	Rank	Points	Ref
2014	Dale Coyne Racing	18	Dallara DW12	Honda	STP; 18	LBH; 10	ALA; 16	IMS; 13	INDY; 17	DET; 8	DET; 15	TXS; 16	HOU; 1	HOU; 23	POC; 20	IOW; 20	TOR; 14	TOR; 15	MDO; 17	MIL; 20	SNM; 22	FON; 21	20th	314	
2015	Dale Coyne Racing	18	Dallara DW12	Honda	STP; 24	NLA; 17	LBH	ALA	IMS; 19	INDY; Wth	DET	DET	TXS	TOR	FON	MIL	IOW	MDO	POC	SNM			36th	31	

==== Indianapolis 500 ====
Year	Chassis	Engine	Start	Finish	Team
2014	Dallara	Honda	21	17	Dale Coyne Racing
2015	Dallara	Honda	Wth (Note: Huertas qualified for the race, but did not take part due to an inner ear infection.)		Dale Coyne Racing
