= Carlos Muñoz (racing driver) =

Colombian racing driver

- Muñoz at the 2016 ABC Supply 500
- Nationality: (Colombia) Colombian
- Born: Carlos Andrés Muñoz; 2 January 1992 (age 34); Bogotá, Colombia

IndyCar Series career
- 73 races run over 6 years
- 2018 position: 25th
- Best finish: 8th (2014)
- First race: 2013 Indianapolis 500 (Indianapolis)
- Last race: 2018 GoPro Grand Prix of Sonoma (Sonoma)
- First win: 2015 Chevrolet Detroit Belle Isle Grand Prix (Detroit)
Wins	Podiums	Poles
1	7	1

Previous series
- 2012–2013 2010–2011 2009 2009 2008–2009 2008 2007: Indy Lights; Formula 3 Euro Series; Formula Renault 2.0 WEC; European F3 Open; Eurocup Formula Renault 2.0; Formula Renault 2.0 Italy; Formula TR 1600 Pro Series

Awards
- 2013 2014: Indianapolis 500 Rookie of the Year; IndyCar Series Rookie of the Year

Carlos Andrés Muñoz (born 2 January 1992) is a Colombian former professional racing driver. He last drove for Schmidt Peterson Motorsports part-time in the IndyCar Series in 2018. He has twice finished second in the Indianapolis 500, during his rookie year in 2013 and in 2016.

== Career ==
=== Karting ===
Born in Bogotá, Muñoz began his motorsport career in karting back in 2002.

=== Formula TR Pro Series FR 1600 ===
In 2007, at the age of fifteen, Muñoz made his debut in single-seaters, racing in the Formula TR Pro Series. He took one podium place in four races to end the season in eighth place.

=== Formula Renault ===
In 2008, Muñoz took part in both the Italian Formula Renault 2.0 and Eurocup Formula Renault 2.0 championships, racing for Prema Powerteam. In the Italian series, he finished sixteenth, taking six-point-scoring positions in twelve races. In the Eurocup, he failed to score a championship point with a best result of thirteenth at both the Nürburgring and Estoril.

The following season, Muñoz competed in both the Eurocup Formula Renault 2.0 and Formula Renault 2.0 West European Cup championships for Epsilon Euskadi. He finished eighth in the Eurocup standings, taking ten points-scoring positions in fourteen races, including a podium in the second race at the Nürburgring. In the West European Cup, he took seventh place in the championship, scoring two podium places.

=== Formula Three ===
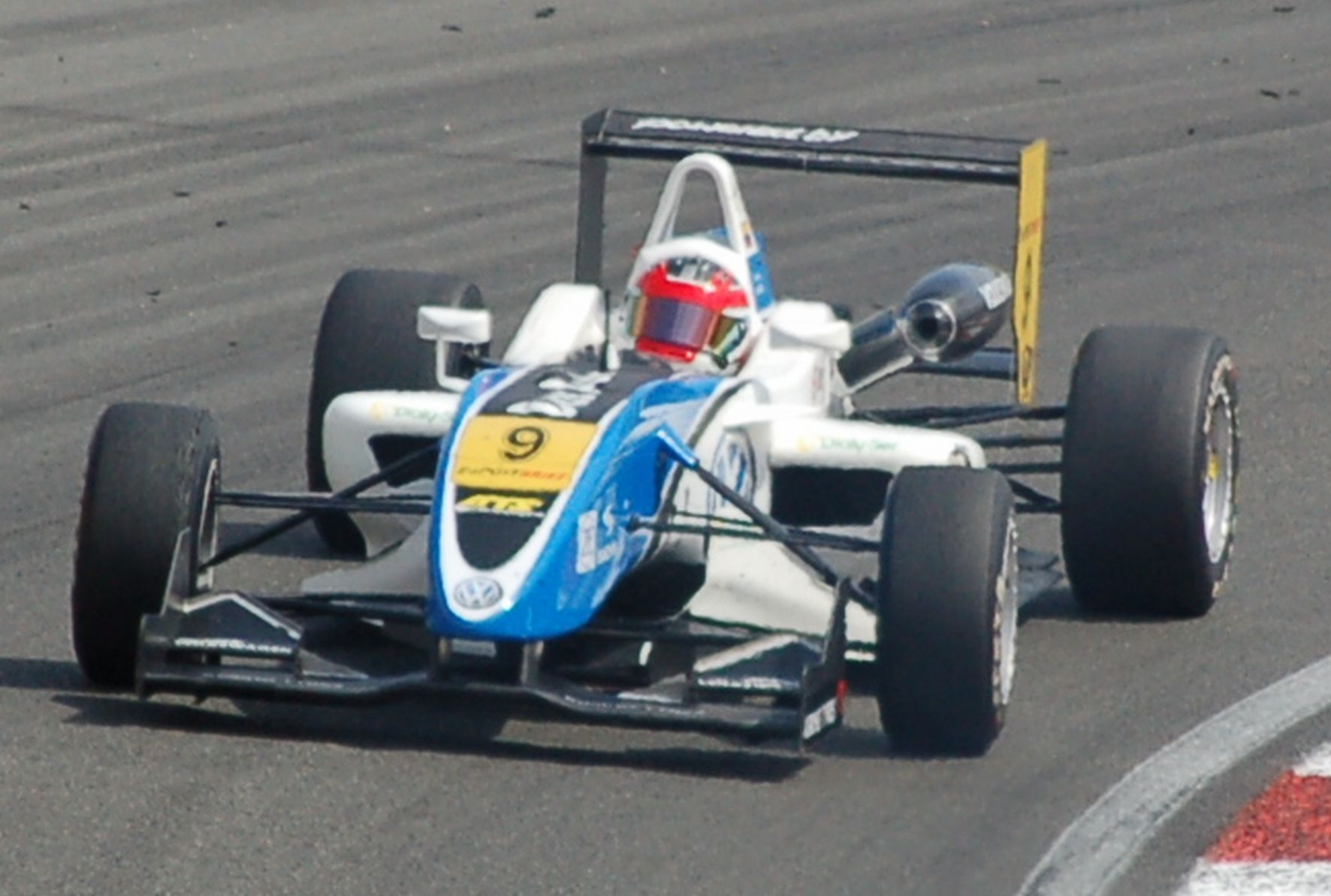
Muñoz at Zandvoort in 2011

Along with his Formula Renault campaigns, Muñoz competed in three rounds of the European F3 Open Championship, driving for Porteiro Motorsport. He finished eleventh in the championship, with a best result of second at Spa-Francorchamps. 2010 saw Muñoz move to the Formula 3 Euro Series, competing for Mücke Motorsport, joining Roberto Merhi at the team. Muñoz finished ninth in the championship with a runner-up finish at Brands Hatch as his best finish. He also competed in two rounds (six races) of the British Formula 3 Championship as a guest driver in the Invitational Class.

In 2011, Muñoz returned to F3 Euro Series, this time driving for Signature. He finished eighth in the championship with a best finish of third at Silverstone Circuit.

=== Indy Lights ===
In 2012, Muñoz moved to the United States to compete in the Indy Lights series for Andretti Autosport. He captured two victories, including one on the oval at Auto Club Speedway and a win from the pole in Edmonton, in addition to three other podium finishes on his way to fifth in the championship. Muñoz returned to the series for the 2013 season with Andretti Autosport and announced a deal to compete in the 2013 Indianapolis 500 with the team.

=== IndyCar Series ===
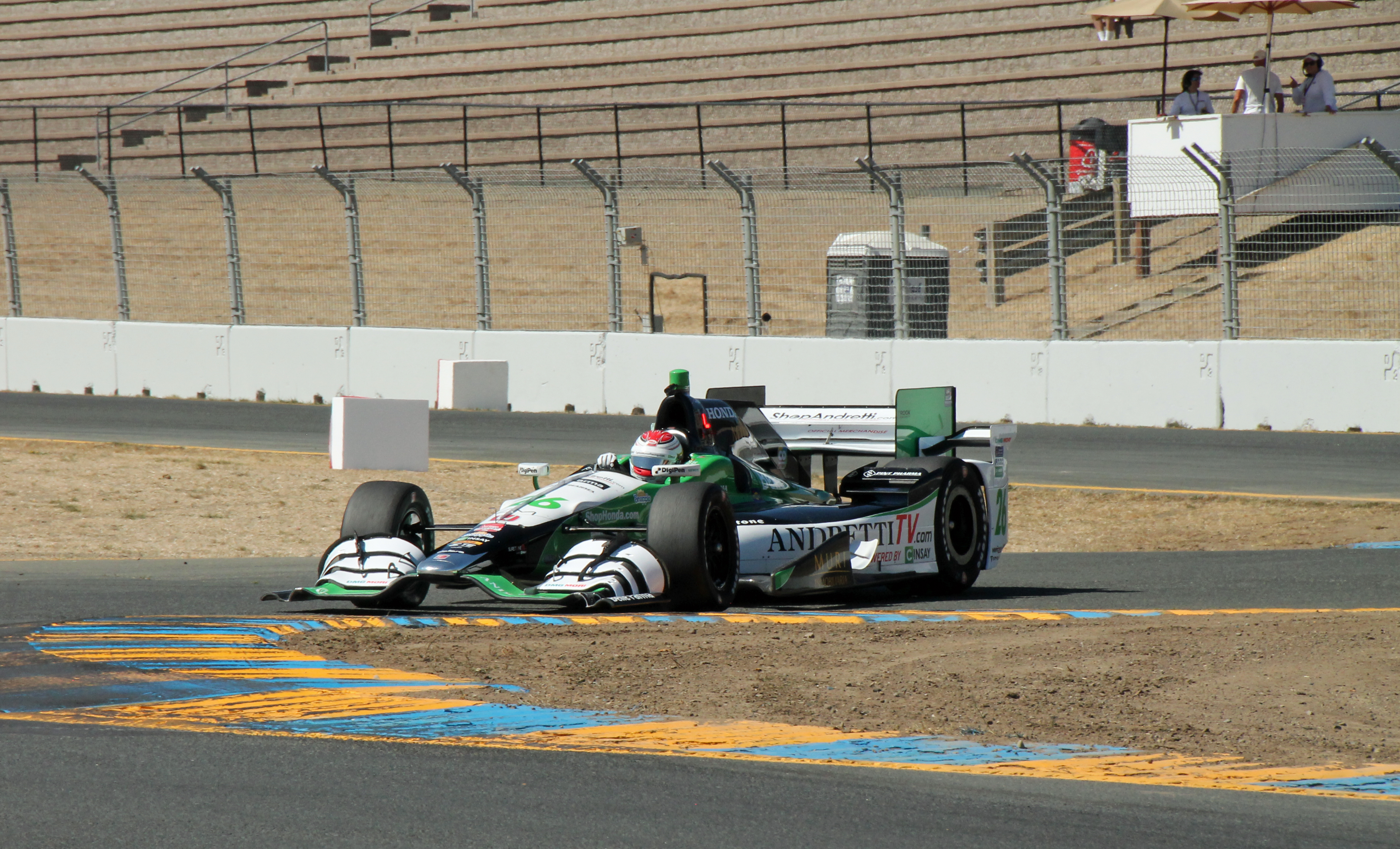
Muñoz at the 2015 GoPro Grand Prix of Sonoma

Muñoz qualified on the front row for the 2013 Indy 500 in second position and ran with the leaders all race long. He led twelve laps and finished in second place, winning Rookie of the Year honors.

At the 2013 Honda Indy Toronto, Muñoz replaced Panther Racing's Ryan Briscoe for Race 2 of the doubleheader after Briscoe broke his right wrist in an incident during Saturday's Race 1. After just twelve laps in the morning warmup to get acclimated with the car, Muñoz started 24th in the race and finished seventeenth.

Muñoz got his first IndyCar win in the rain-shortened Race 1 of the Detroit Belle Isle Dual Grand Prix on 30 May 2015.

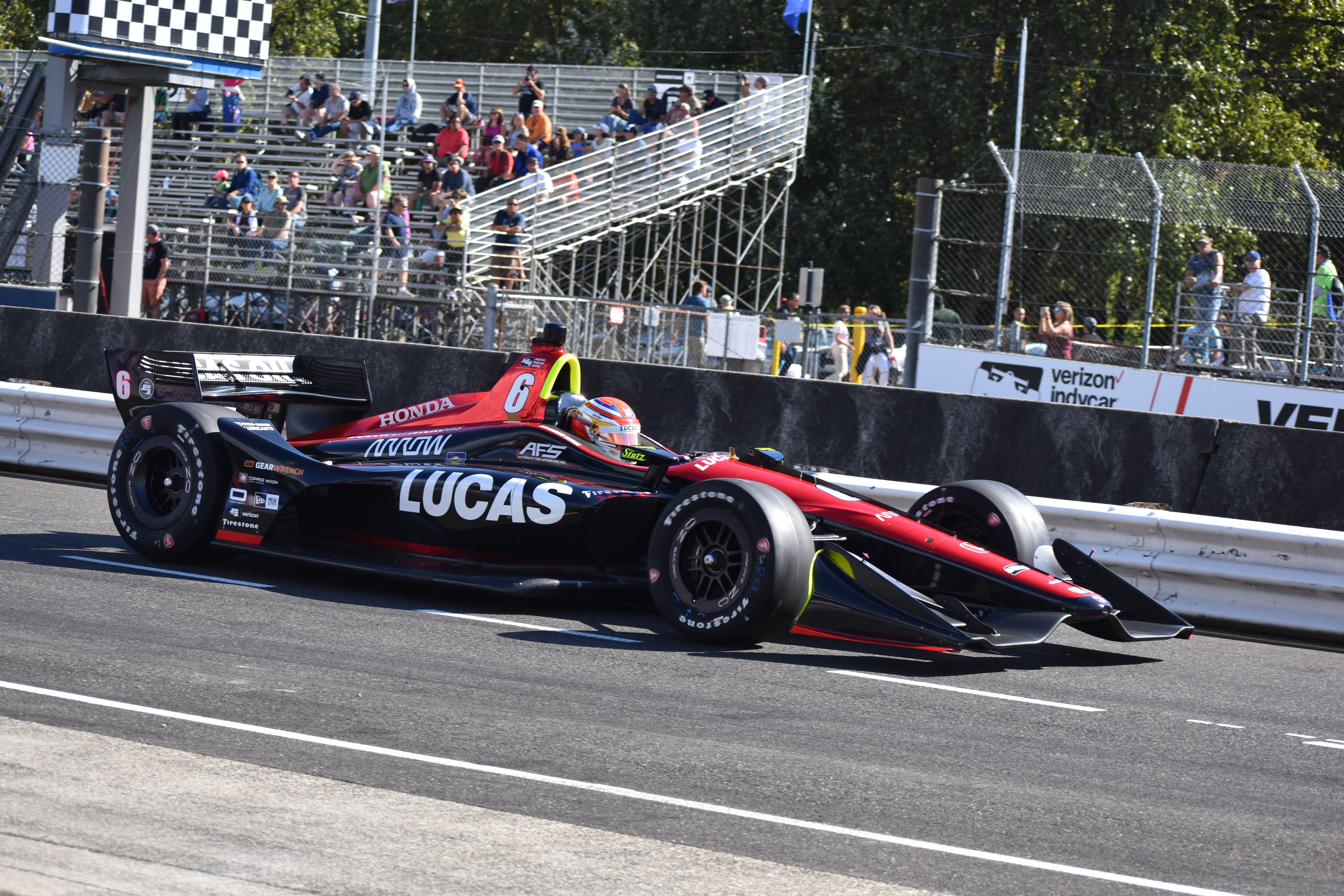
Muñoz heading out for qualifying at Portland International Raceway in 2018.

After a distant second-place finish to teammate Alexander Rossi in the 2016 Indianapolis 500, Muñoz left Andretti Autosport after the 2016 IndyCar season ended. Muñoz joined A. J. Foyt Enterprises for the 2017 IndyCar season, lasting one season.

In 2018, Muñoz made his return to Andretti in a one-race deal at the 2018 Indianapolis 500, finishing seventh. Later in the season, he filled in for the injured Robert Wickens for the final two races of the season at Portland and Sonoma, driving for Schmidt Peterson Motorsports. Muñoz started fourteenth and finished twelfth at Portland.

== Racing record ==
=== Career summary ===
Season	Series	Team	Races	Wins	Poles	F/Laps	Podiums	Points	Position
2007	Formula TR Pro Series FR 1600	JP Motorsports	4	0	0	?	1	72	8th
2008	Formula Renault 2.0 Eurocup	Prema Powerteam	14	0	0	0	0	0	34th
2008	Formula Renault 2.0 Italy	Prema Powerteam	12	0	0	0	0	66	16th
2009	Formula Renault 2.0 Eurocup	Epsilon Euskadi	14	0	0	0	1	36	8th
2009	Formula Renault 2.0 WEC	Epsilon Euskadi	14	0	0	0	2	58	7th
2009	European F3 Open	Porteiro Motorsport	6	0	0	0	2	33	12th
2010	Formula 3 Euro Series	Mücke Motorsport	18	0	0	0	1	18	9th
2011	Formula 3 Euro Series	Signature	27	0	0	1	2	105	8th
2012	Indy Lights	Andretti Autosport	12	2	1	0	5	377	5th
2013	Indy Lights	Andretti Autosport	12	4	5	5	5	441	**3rd**
2013	IndyCar Series	Andretti Autosport	2	0	0	0	1	74	28th
2013	IndyCar Series	Panther Racing	1	0	0	0	0	74	28th
2014	IndyCar Series	Andretti Autosport	18	0	0	0	3	483	8th
2015	IndyCar Series	Andretti Autosport	16	1	0	0	1	349	13th
2016	IndyCar Series	Andretti Autosport	16	0	1	0	2	432	10th
2017	IndyCar Series	A. J. Foyt Enterprises	17	0	0	0	0	328	16th
2018	IndyCar Series	Andretti Autosport	1	0	0	0	0	95	25th
2018	IndyCar Series	Schmidt Peterson Motorsports	2	0	0	1	0	95	25th

=== Complete Eurocup Formula Renault 2.0 results ===
(key) (Races in bold indicate pole position; races in italics indicate fastest lap)

Year	Entrant	1	2	3	4	5	6	7	8	9	10	11	12	13	14	DC	Points
2008	Prema Powerteam	SPA; 1; 28	SPA; 2; 25	SIL; 1; 29	SIL; 2; 20	HUN; 1 Ret	HUN; 2; 24	NÜR; 1 Ret	NÜR; 2; 13	LMS; 1; 19	LMS; 2; 19	EST; 1 Ret	EST; 2; 13	CAT; 1; 16	CAT; 2; 26	34th	0
2009	Epsilon Euskadi	CAT; 1; 9	CAT; 2 Ret	SPA; 1; 8	SPA; 2 Ret	HUN; 1; 5	HUN; 2 Ret	SIL; 1; 5	SIL; 2; 9	LMS; 1; 8	LMS; 2; 10	NÜR; 1 Ret	NÜR; 2; 3	ALC; 1; 11	ALC; 2; 10	8th	36

=== Complete Formula 3 Euro Series results ===
(key)

Year	Entrant	Chassis	Engine	1	2	3	4	5	6	7	8	9	10	11	12	13	14	15	16	17	18	19	20	21	22	23	24	25	26	27	DC	Points
2010	Mücke Motorsport	Dallara F308/042	Mercedes	LEC; 1 Ret	LEC; 2; 12	HOC; 1; 14	HOC; 2 Ret	VAL; 1; 10	VAL; 2 Ret	NOR; 1; 6	NOR; 2; 9	NÜR; 1; 14	NÜR; 2; 9	ZAN; 1; 6	ZAN; 2; 4	BRH; 1; 7	BRH; 2; 2	OSC; 1; 8	OSC; 2; 10	HOC; 1; 11	HOC; 2; 6										9th	18
2011	Signature	Dallara F308	Volkswagen	LEC; 1; 6	LEC; 2; 5	LEC; 3; 7	HOC; 1; 8	HOC; 2; 2	HOC; 3; 9	ZAN; 1; 6	ZAN; 2; 12	ZAN; 3; 8	RBR; 1; 10	RBR; 2; 9	RBR; 3; 5	NOR; 1; 9	NOR; 2 Ret	NOR; 3; 13	NÜR; 1; 9	NÜR; 2; 8	NÜR; 3; 8	SIL; 1; 10	SIL; 2; 11	SIL; 3; 3	VAL; 1; 5	VAL; 2; 7	VAL; 3; 10	HOC; 1; 8	HOC; 2; 14	HOC; 3 Ret	8th	105

=== American open–wheel racing results ===
(key)

==== Indy Lights ====
Year	Team	1	2	3	4	5	6	7	8	9	10	11	12	Rank	Points	Ref
2012	Andretti Autosport	STP; 14	ALA; 14	LBH; 5	INDY; 2	DET; 2	MIL; 5	IOW; 7	TOR; 10	**EDM**; 1	TRO; 3	BAL; 11	FON; 1	5th	377	
2013	Andretti Autosport	**STP**; 7	**ALA**; 1	**LBH**; 1	INDY; 4	MIL; 2	**IOW**; 8	**POC**; 1	TOR; 4	MOH; 4	BAL; 9	HOU; 12	FON; 1	3rd	441	

==== IndyCar Series ====
(key)

Year	Team	No.	Chassis	Engine	1	2	3	4	5	6	7	8	9	10	11	12	13	14	15	16	17	18	19	Rank	Points	Ref
2013	Andretti Autosport	26	Dallara DW12	Chevrolet	STP	ALA	LBH	SAO	INDY; 2	DET	DET	TXS	MIL	IOW	POC	TOR								28th	74	
2013	Andretti Autosport	5	Dallara DW12	Chevrolet																			FON; 23	28th	74	
2013	Panther Racing	4	Dallara DW12	Chevrolet													TOR; 17	MOH	SNM	BAL	HOU	HOU		28th	74	
2014	Andretti Autosport	34	Dallara DW12	Honda	STP; 17	LBH; 3	ALA; 23	IMS; 24	INDY; 4	DET; 7	DET; 8	TXS; 13	HOU; 3	HOU; 22	POC; 3	IOW; 12	TOR; 17	TOR; 17	MOH; 4	MIL; 22	SNM; 19	FON; 8		8th	483	
2015	Andretti Autosport	26	Dallara DW12	Honda	STP; 14	NLA; 12	LBH; 9	ALA; 6	IMS; 13	INDY; 20	DET; 1	DET; 23	TXS; 6	TOR; 22	FON; 11	MIL; 15	IOW; 5	MOH; 9	POC; 5	SNM; 22				13th	349	
2016	Andretti Autosport	26	Dallara DW12	Honda	STP; 8	PHX; 22	LBH; 12	ALA; 14	IMS; 12	INDY; 2	DET; 6	DET; 15	RDA; 10	IOW; 12	TOR; 17	MOH; 3	POC; 7	**TXS**; 7	WGL; 11	SNM; 15				10th	432	
2017	A. J. Foyt Enterprises	14	Dallara DW12	Chevrolet	STP; 21	LBH; 7	ALA; 17	PHX; 10	IMS; 15	INDY; 10	DET; 14	DET; 11	TEX; 18	ROA; 11	IOW; 20	TOR; 15	MOH; 18	POC; 10	GTW; 9	WGL; 10	SNM; 15			16th	328	
2018	Andretti Autosport	29	Dallara DW12	Honda	STP	PHX	LBH	ALA	IMS	INDY; 7	DET	DET	TXS	RDA	IOW	TOR	MOH	POC	GTW					25th	95	
2018	Schmidt Peterson Motorsports	6	Dallara DW12	Honda																POR; 12	SNM; 18			25th	95	

* Season still in progress.

==== Indianapolis 500 ====
Year	Chassis	Engine	Start	Finish	Team
2013	Dallara	Chevrolet	2	2	Andretti Autosport
2014	Dallara	Honda	7	4	Andretti Autosport
2015	Dallara	Honda	11	20	Andretti Autosport
2016	Dallara	Honda	5	2	Andretti Autosport
2017	Dallara	Chevrolet	24	10	A. J. Foyt Enterprises
2018	Dallara	Honda	21	7	Andretti Autosport

Awards
Preceded by Rubens Barrichello	Indianapolis 500; Rookie of the Year; 2013	Succeeded by Kurt Busch
Preceded by Tristan Vautier	IndyCar Series; Rookie of the Year; 2014	Succeeded by Gabby Chaves
