= 2014 IndyCar Series =

American auto racing season

2014 IndyCar season
- Verizon IndyCar Series

Season
- Races: 18
- Start date: March 30
- End date: August 30

Awards
- Drivers' champion: (Australia) Will Power
- Manufacturers' Cup: (United States) Chevrolet
- Rookie of the Year: (Colombia) Carlos Muñoz
- Indianapolis 500 winner: (United States) Ryan Hunter-Reay

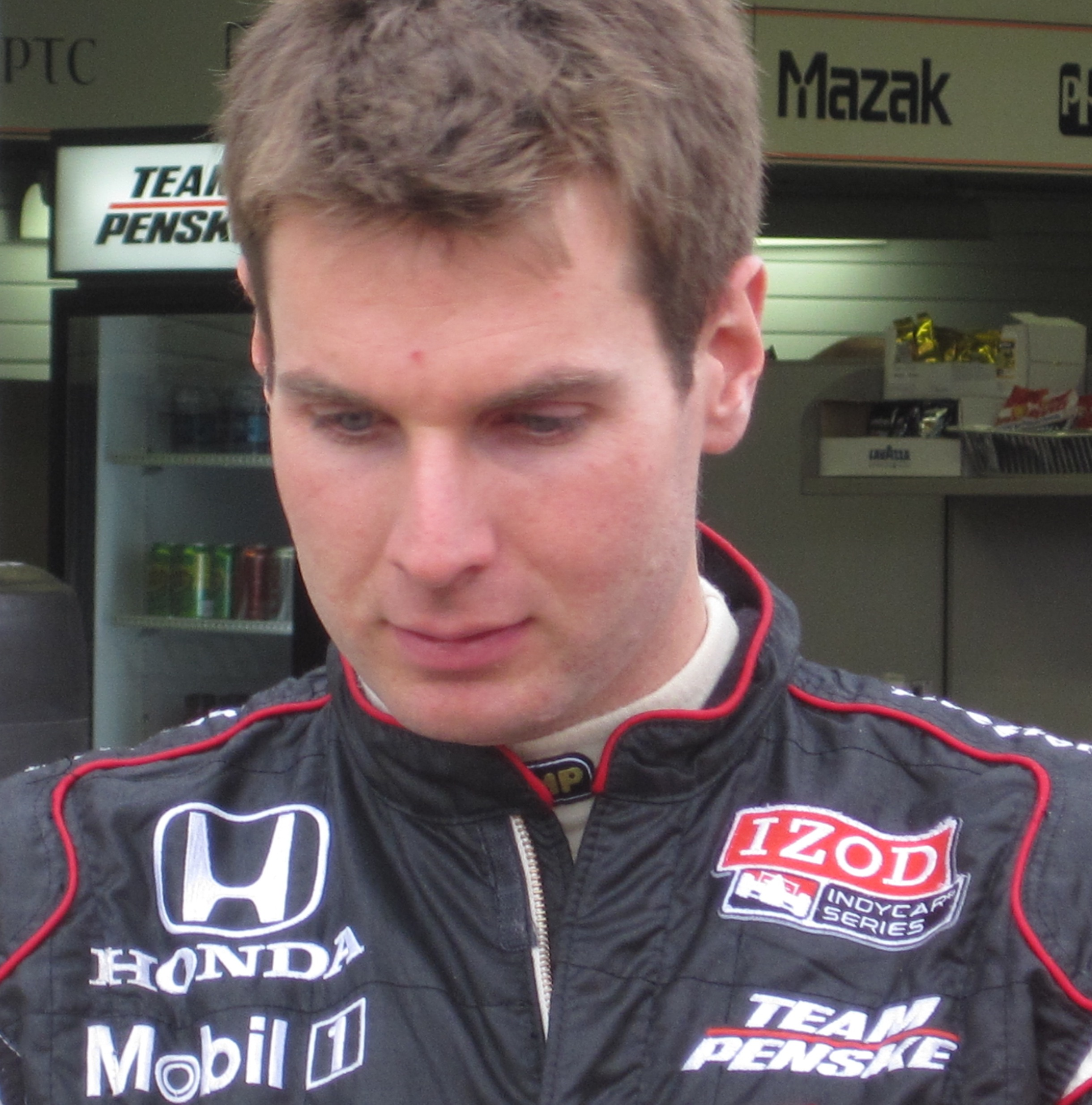
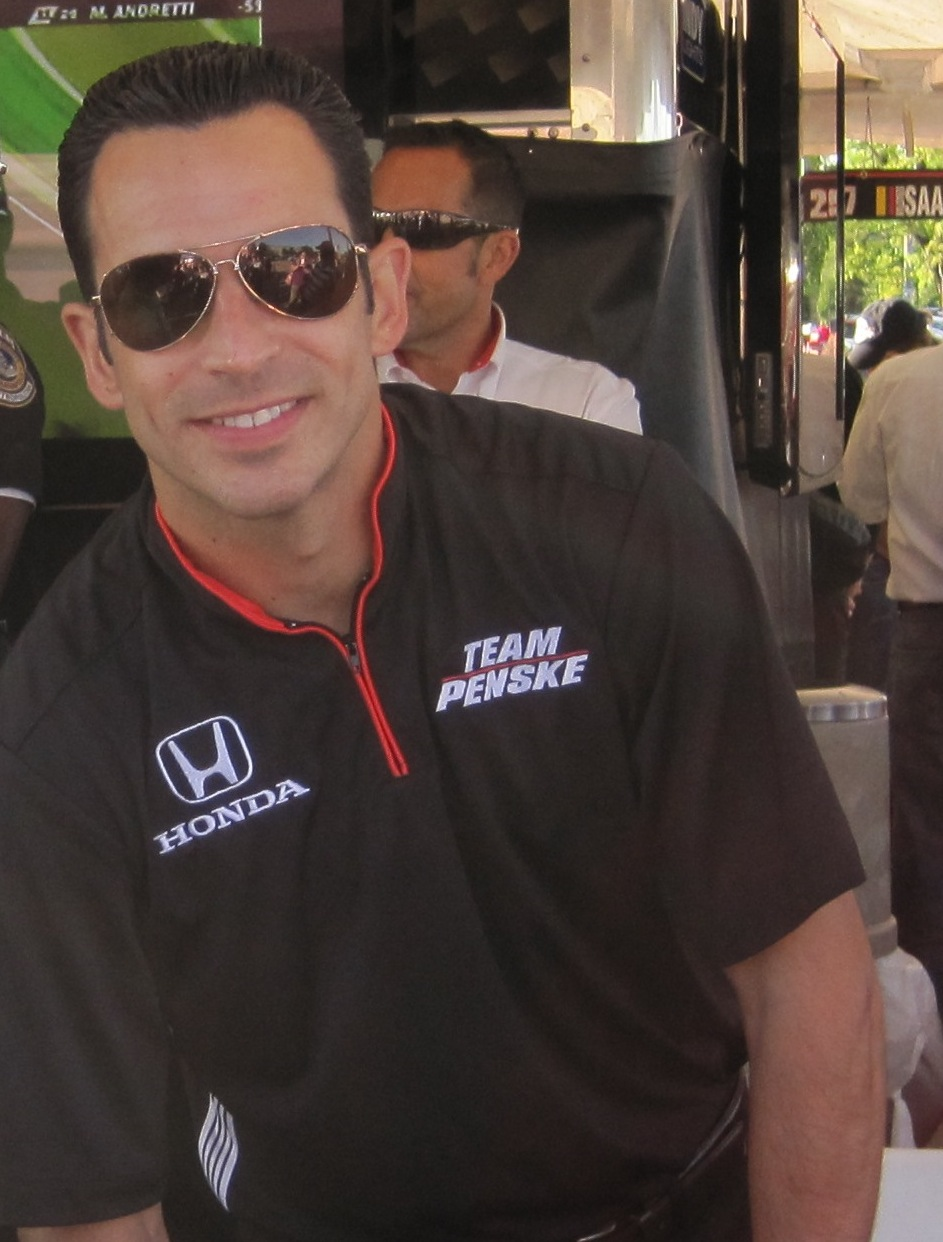
Will Power (left) won his first Drivers' Championship while Hélio Castroneves (right) finished second in the championship.

The 2014 Verizon IndyCar Series was the 19th season of the IndyCar Series and the 103rd season of American open wheel racing. Scott Dixon entered the season as the defending IndyCar champion, while Chevrolet entered as the reigning Manufacturers' champion. The season's premier event was the 98th Indianapolis 500, held on Sunday, May 25 and won by Ryan Hunter-Reay.

The season featured eleven different winners, tying an IndyCar record previously set in CART in 2000 and 2001. Heading into the final race of the season at Auto Club Speedway, Will Power led Hélio Castroneves by 51 points. In a race in which a spin by Hunter-Reay produced the only yellow flag, Power finished ninth, while Castroneves – who was penalized for a pit entry violation – finished fourteenth. As a result, Power clinched his first series title by 62 points, and the first drivers' title for Team Penske since Sam Hornish Jr. in 2006. In the manufacturers' championship, Chevrolet successfully defended their title ahead of Honda.

== Series news ==
- Full-time IndyCar Series entries will begin utilizing mandatory twin-turbocharged V6 engines from 2014 onwards, as it was announced on July 25, 2013. The single-turbocharged engines which was used by Honda in 2012-2013 were officially banned.
- IZOD terminated its sponsorship after the 2013 season, two years before the end of their contract. On March 14, 2014, IndyCar announced Verizon Wireless as the new title sponsor of the IndyCar Series.

== Confirmed entries ==
- All chassis were composed of a Dallara DW12 "IndyCar Safety Cell" base chassis, and Dallara aerokit. All teams competed with Firestone tires. On December 21, 2012, Firestone signed a five-year contract extension with IndyCar to be the official supplier for IndyCar through 2018. The original engine lease contracts that were signed by the teams prior to the 2012 season were up for renewal prior to the 2014 season, and several teams switched engine providers for the 2014 season. The list below reflects drivers who competed in the 2014 season.
- R denotes an IndyCar Series rookie.

Team	Engine	No.	Driver(s)	Round(s)
A. J. Foyt Enterprises	Honda	14	(Japan) Takuma Sato	All
A. J. Foyt Enterprises	Honda	41	(United Kingdom) Martin Plowman R	4–5
Andretti Autosport	Honda	25	(United States) Marco Andretti	All
Andretti Autosport	Honda	26	(France) Franck Montagny R	4
Andretti Autosport	Honda	26	(United States) Kurt Busch R	5
Andretti Autosport	Honda	27	(Canada) James Hinchcliffe (Note: Replaced by E. J. Viso in Indy 500 practice due to injury.)	All
Andretti Autosport	Honda	28	(United States) Ryan Hunter-Reay	All
Andretti / HVM	Honda	34	(Colombia) Carlos Muñoz R	All
Bryan Herta Autosport	Honda	98	(United Kingdom) Jack Hawksworth R	All
Chip Ganassi Racing	Chevrolet	8	(Australia) Ryan Briscoe	All
Chip Ganassi Racing	Chevrolet	9	(New Zealand) Scott Dixon	All
Chip Ganassi Racing	Chevrolet	10	(Brazil) Tony Kanaan	All
Chip Ganassi Racing	Chevrolet	83	(United States) Charlie Kimball	All
Dale Coyne Racing	Honda	18	(Colombia) Carlos Huertas R	All
Dale Coyne Racing	Honda	19	(United Kingdom) Justin Wilson	All
Dale Coyne Racing	Honda	63	(United Kingdom) Pippa Mann	5
Dreyer & Reinbold - Kingdom Racing	Chevrolet	22	(United States) Sage Karam R (Note: Conjunction with Chip Ganassi Racing.)	5
Ed Carpenter Racing	Chevrolet	20	(United Kingdom) Mike Conway	1–4, 6–7, 9–10, 13–15, 17
Ed Carpenter Racing	Chevrolet	20	(United States) Ed Carpenter	5, 8, 11–12, 16, 18
Ed Carpenter Racing	Chevrolet	21	(United States) J. R. Hildebrand	5
KV Racing Technology	Chevrolet	6	(United States) Townsend Bell	5
KV Racing Technology	Chevrolet	33	(Australia) James Davison R	5
KVSH Racing	Chevrolet	11	(France) Sébastien Bourdais	All
KV AFS Racing	Chevrolet	17	(Colombia) Sebastián Saavedra	All
Lazier Partners Racing	Chevrolet	91	(United States) Buddy Lazier	5
Rahal Letterman Lanigan Racing	Honda	15	(United States) Graham Rahal	All
Rahal Letterman Lanigan Racing	Honda	16	(Spain) Oriol Servià	2–5
Rahal Letterman Lanigan Racing	Honda	16	(Italy) Luca Filippi R	9–10, 13–14
Sarah Fisher Hartman Racing	Honda	67	(United States) Josef Newgarden	All
Sarah Fisher Hartman Racing	Honda	68	(Canada) Alex Tagliani	5
Schmidt Peterson Motorsports	Honda	5	(Canada) Jacques Villeneuve (Note: Conjunction with Team Pelfrey.)	5
Schmidt Peterson Motorsports	Honda	7	(Russia) Mikhail Aleshin R (Note: Conjunction with SMP Racing.)	All
Schmidt Peterson Motorsports	Honda	77	(France) Simon Pagenaud	All
Team Penske	Chevrolet	2	(Colombia) Juan Pablo Montoya	All
Team Penske	Chevrolet	3	(Brazil) Hélio Castroneves	All
Team Penske	Chevrolet	12	(Australia) Will Power	All

=== Team and driver news ===
- Juan Pablo Montoya returned to IndyCar in 2014 after a 13-year absence, driving the No. 2 Chevrolet, for Team Penske. Due to his previous CART experience, he was not considered as a rookie.
- Another Colombian driver, Indy 500 runner-up Carlos Muñoz, debuted full-time with Andretti Autosport in their fourth car for the 2014 season, replacing E. J. Viso.
- Chip Ganassi Racing switched to Chevrolet engines, having used Honda engines since 2006.
- Tony Kanaan left KV Racing Technology and joined Chip Ganassi Racing to replace the retired Dario Franchitti.
- Sébastien Bourdais left Dragon Racing for KV Racing Technology in a 2-year deal. Bourdais' teammate at Dragon, Sebastián Saavedra, was announced as his teammate at KV on February 12.
- Andretti Autosport returned to racing with full-works Honda engines in a multi-year deal, after running Chevrolet engines in 2013. Andretti Autosport received free engines from Honda and thus earned full factory support from Honda Performance Development.
- Dario Franchitti announced his retirement from motorsport on the medical advice of his doctors following his accident in the Sunday race of the 2013 Grand Prix of Houston. In December, Kanaan was announced as Franchitti's replacement in the No. 10 car.
- 2010 Formula Renault 3.5 Series champion Mikhail Aleshin replaced Tristan Vautier in the second Schmidt Peterson Motorsports entry, becoming the first Russian driver to compete in the series.
- Ryan Briscoe returned to full-time racing in the No. 8 Chip Ganassi Racing Chevrolet.
- Dragon Racing did not return to run a full-time IndyCar schedule in 2014 in order to prepare the team to compete in the 2014–2015 Formula E season.
- Simona de Silvestro departed the IndyCar Series after four seasons to take on a testing role with the Sauber F1 team.
- Panther Racing did not field an entry in the 2014 IndyCar Series after the loss of its National Guard sponsorship to Rahal Letterman Lanigan Racing.

== Schedule ==
The 2014 IndyCar Series schedule was formally announced on NBC Sports Network's INDYCAR Championship Preview Show on October 17, 2013. The schedule consisted of eighteen races, hosted across 15 tracks and 14 venues. Included were three doubleheader events, in Detroit, Houston and Toronto. Also new was a race on the Indianapolis Motor Speedway revised road course to kick off the month of May festivities. The IndyCar Triple Crown featured the three 500-mile races, at Indianapolis, Pocono and Fontana, and offered a $1,000,000 bonus to a driver if they won all three events, with a $250,000 consolation prize if a driver won two of the three events. Neither prize was ultimately claimed.

This was the first season since 2002 that the IndyCar Series did not feature international races outside of the United States of America and Canada after the removal of Surfers Paradise (Australia) in 2009, Motegi (Japan) in 2012 and São Paulo (Brazil) in 2014.

Icon	Legend
O	Oval/Speedway
R	Road course
S	Street circuit
BOLD	Fuzzy's Ultra Premium Vodka Triple Crown event.

Rnd	Date	Race name	Track	Location
1	March 30	Firestone Grand Prix of St. Petersburg	S Streets of St. Petersburg	St. Petersburg, Florida
2	April 13	40th Toyota Grand Prix of Long Beach	S Streets of Long Beach	Long Beach, California
3	April 27	Honda Indy Grand Prix of Alabama	R Barber Motorsports Park	Birmingham, Alabama
4	May 10	Grand Prix of Indianapolis	R Indianapolis Motor Speedway Road Course	Speedway, Indiana
5	May 25	98th Indianapolis 500-Mile Race	O Indianapolis Motor Speedway	Speedway, Indiana
6	May 31	Chevrolet Indy Dual in Detroit presented by Quicken Loans	S Belle Isle	Detroit, Michigan
7	June 1	Chevrolet Indy Dual in Detroit presented by Quicken Loans	S Belle Isle	Detroit, Michigan
8	June 7	Firestone 600K	O Texas Motor Speedway	Fort Worth, Texas
9	June 28	Shell and Pennzoil Grand Prix of Houston	S Reliant Park	Houston, Texas
10	June 29	Shell and Pennzoil Grand Prix of Houston	S Reliant Park	Houston, Texas
11	July 6	Pocono IndyCar 500 fueled by Sunoco	O Pocono Raceway	Long Pond, Pennsylvania
12	July 12	Iowa Corn Indy 300 presented by DeKalb	O Iowa Speedway	Newton, Iowa
13	July 20	Honda Indy Toronto (Note: Owing to persistent rain, the first race of the double-header – due to be held on July 19 – was postponed to the following day.)	S Exhibition Place	Toronto, Ontario
14	July 20	Honda Indy Toronto	S Exhibition Place	Toronto, Ontario
15	August 3	Honda Indy 200 at Mid-Ohio	R Mid-Ohio Sports Car Course	Lexington, Ohio
16	August 17	ABC Supply Wisconsin 250	O The Milwaukee Mile	West Allis, Wisconsin
17	August 24	GoPro Grand Prix of Sonoma	R Sonoma Raceway	Sonoma, California
18	August 30	MAVTV 500 IndyCar World Championships	O Auto Club Speedway	Fontana, California

=== Calendar changes ===
- The event at Pocono Raceway was extended to 500-miles from the 400-miles run in 2013.
- The event at Texas Motor Speedway was extended to 600-kilometres from the 550-kilometres it ran the past 7 years.
- The road course at the Indianapolis Motor Speedway, used for the United States Grand Prix in Formula One (2000–2007) and currently the Red Bull Indianapolis Grand Prix in MotoGP, held a race on Saturday, May 10; as part of the opening weekend of track activity for the Indianapolis 500. The race ran on a 2.434-mile (3.917 km) modified version of the Formula One road course, running clockwise around the oval section of the speedway. It also featured a standing start. Opening Day practice for the Indy 500 commenced on Sunday, May 11.
- The race at Iowa Speedway was extended to a 300 lap event.
- The Baltimore Street Circuit race weekend did not run due to scheduling conflicts.
- The São Paulo Indy 300 was removed from the schedule.

== Results ==
Rd.	Race	Pole position	Fastest lap	Most laps led	Race Winner			Report
Rd.	Race	Pole position	Fastest lap	Most laps led	Driver	Team	Manufacturer	Report
1	St. Petersburg	(Japan) Takuma Sato	(Australia) Will Power	(Australia) Will Power	(Australia) Will Power	Team Penske	Chevrolet	Report
2	Long Beach	(United States) Ryan Hunter-Reay	(Brazil) Hélio Castroneves	(United States) Ryan Hunter-Reay	(United Kingdom) Mike Conway	Ed Carpenter Racing	Chevrolet	Report
3	Birmingham	(Australia) Will Power	(New Zealand) Scott Dixon	(United States) Ryan Hunter-Reay	(United States) Ryan Hunter-Reay	Andretti Autosport	Honda	Report
4	Indianapolis GP	(Colombia) Sebastián Saavedra	(New Zealand) Scott Dixon	(United Kingdom) Jack Hawksworth	(France) Simon Pagenaud	Schmidt Peterson Motorsports	Honda	Report
5	Indianapolis 500	(United States) Ed Carpenter	(Colombia) Juan Pablo Montoya	(United States) Ryan Hunter-Reay	(United States) Ryan Hunter-Reay	Andretti Autosport	Honda	Report
6	Detroit 1	(Brazil) Hélio Castroneves	(United States) Graham Rahal	(Brazil) Hélio Castroneves	(Australia) Will Power	Team Penske	Chevrolet	Report
7	Detroit 2	(Japan) Takuma Sato	(New Zealand) Scott Dixon	(Brazil) Hélio Castroneves	(Brazil) Hélio Castroneves	Team Penske	Chevrolet	Report
8	Texas	(Australia) Will Power	(Brazil) Tony Kanaan	(Australia) Will Power	(United States) Ed Carpenter	Ed Carpenter Racing	Chevrolet	Report
9	Houston 1	(France) Simon Pagenaud	(France) Simon Pagenaud	(Canada) James Hinchcliffe	(Colombia) Carlos Huertas	Dale Coyne Racing	Honda	Report
10	Houston 2	(Brazil) Hélio Castroneves	(France) Simon Pagenaud	(Brazil) Hélio Castroneves	(France) Simon Pagenaud	Schmidt Peterson Motorsports	Honda	Report
11	Pocono	(Colombia) Juan Pablo Montoya	(Australia) Ryan Briscoe	(Brazil) Tony Kanaan	(Colombia) Juan Pablo Montoya	Team Penske	Chevrolet	Report
12	Iowa	(New Zealand) Scott Dixon	(United States) Josef Newgarden	(Brazil) Tony Kanaan	(United States) Ryan Hunter-Reay	Andretti Autosport	Honda	Report
13	Toronto 1	(France) Sébastien Bourdais	(France) Simon Pagenaud	(France) Sébastien Bourdais	(France) Sébastien Bourdais	KV Racing Technology	Chevrolet	Report
14	Toronto 2	(Brazil) Hélio Castroneves	(Colombia) Juan Pablo Montoya	(Brazil) Hélio Castroneves	(United Kingdom) Mike Conway	Ed Carpenter Racing	Chevrolet	Report
15	Mid-Ohio	(France) Sébastien Bourdais	(Brazil) Hélio Castroneves	(New Zealand) Scott Dixon	(New Zealand) Scott Dixon	Chip Ganassi Racing	Chevrolet	Report
16	Milwaukee	(Australia) Will Power	(United States) Josef Newgarden	(Australia) Will Power	(Australia) Will Power	Team Penske	Chevrolet	Report
17	Sonoma	(Australia) Will Power	(Brazil) Hélio Castroneves	(Australia) Will Power	(New Zealand) Scott Dixon	Chip Ganassi Racing	Chevrolet	Report
18	Fontana	(Brazil) Hélio Castroneves	(Australia) Will Power	(Colombia) Juan Pablo Montoya	(Brazil) Tony Kanaan	Chip Ganassi Racing	Chevrolet	Report

== Race summaries ==
=== Round 1: St. Petersburg ===
Takuma Sato sat on the pole, but he lost the lead at lap 30 to Will Power. On a restart on lap 82, leader Will Power was bringing the field back to green when an "accordion effect" saw the field check-up on the main stretch. Marco Andretti and rookie Jack Hawksworth made contact and crashed into the inside barrier.

Power led the most laps, and held off Ryan Hunter-Reay and Hélio Castroneves for the victory. Polesitter Takuma Sato finished 6th.

=== Round 2: Long Beach ===
On lap 56, a controversial crash took out six cars, including the drivers running 1st–2nd–3rd. During a sequence of green flag pit stops, Josef Newgarden inherited the lead. Ryan Hunter-Reay, James Hinchcliffe, and Will Power were running nose-to-tail in 2nd–3rd–4th. Newgarden completed his pit stop, and came out on the track just ahead of Hunter-Reay, momentarily holding on to the lead. Going into turn 4, Hunter-Reay attempted a risky pass for the lead, and he made contact with Newgarden, sending both cars into the wall. Hinchcliffe was collected, as was three other cars in the huge melee that nearly blocked the track.

Late in the race, Scott Dixon led, followed by Mike Conway and Power close behind. Dixon ran out of fuel, and had to pit with two laps to go. Part timer Conway held off Power and Munoz to win his second Long Beach Grand Prix.

=== Round 3: Barber ===
Heavy rain and lightning delayed the start of the race. Will Power took the lead at the start and led the first 15 laps. But he spun out in the turn 5 hairpin on lap 16, giving up the lead to Ryan Hunter-Reay. Hunter-Reay went on to lead 40 of the race's 69 laps and ultimately won the race; two weeks after creating a stir and raising tempers around the paddock at Long Beach.

Due to the late start, the race was changed to a 100-minute timed race but finished under caution when rookie Mikhail Aleshin had a heavy crash into the tire barriers, littering the track with debris.

=== Round 4: Grand Prix of Indianapolis ===
The month of May at Indianapolis opened with the Inaugural Grand Prix of Indianapolis on the Speedway's road course. With the field lined up for a standing start, polesitter Sebastián Saavedra's car stalled. A huge crash resulted, involving Saavedra, Carlos Muñoz, and Mikhail Aleshin, showering debris along the frontstretch and into the pit area.

Late in the race, Simon Pagenaud led Ryan Hunter-Reay. Both drivers were low on fuel, and trying to nurse their cars to the finish. Hélio Castroneves, who had pitted for fuel, was charging through the field, and looking to run down the leaders. Pagenaud held off the challenge, and crossed the finish line just ahead of Hunter-Reay and Castroneves. Pagenaud's car ran out of fuel on the cool down lap. Series rookie Jack Hawksworth, who earned his first front-row start, led a field-high 31 laps and finished seventh.

=== Round 5: 98th Indianapolis 500 ===
Indianapolis resident and now oval only driver Ed Carpenter won the pole position for the 98th Indianapolis 500.

The race started with a long green flag run of 149 laps. Charlie Kimball and Scott Dixon suffered single-car crashes, then James Hinchcliffe and Ed Carpenter tangled on a restart. The red flag halted the race with 9 laps to go for a crash involving Townsend Bell. After the restart, Ryan Hunter-Reay and Hélio Castroneves dueled for the win, followed closely Marco Andretti. Hunter-Reay won the race by 0.06 seconds, the second closest finish in Indy 500 history.

=== Round 6: Detroit (Sat.) ===
Will Power took the lead with 11 laps to go, and held off Graham Rahal over the final 10 laps to win Race 1 of the Dual in Detroit. Indy 500 winner Ryan Hunter-Reay finished 16th after he spun into a tire barrier on the last lap.

=== Round 7: Detroit (Sun.) ===
Hélio Castroneves won Race 2 of the Dual in Detroit, sweeping the weekend for Team Penske. Will Power finished second, charging from the back of the pack after an early drive through penalty. After spinning out a day earlier, Ryan Hunter-Reay had another bad day, dropping out with electrical problems.

=== Round 8: Texas ===
During the final round of pit stops – on lap 213 of 248 – Ed Carpenter and Will Power were running first and second, but Power was penalized for speeding as he entered the pit lane. After a drive-through penalty, Power dropped to sixth. A late caution on lap 241 bunched the field and allowed Power to close in. Carpenter and second place Juan Pablo Montoya stayed out during the yellow to maintain their track position, but Power and others chose to pit for new tires. The green came out with two laps to go, and Carpenter got the jump on the restart. With fresh tires, Power charged through the traffic, passing Montoya for second in the final corner, and just held him off as Carpenter cruised to the victory.

=== Round 9: Houston (Sat.) ===
Colombian drivers Carlos Huertas, Juan Pablo Montoya, and Carlos Muñoz swept the podium in the first race of the Houston doubleheader. Rain soaked the race, which was shortened from 90 laps to a timed race of 1 hour and 50 minutes. Huertas took the lead with about seven minutes remaining. Under a late caution, the field was coming to a restart with one lap to go. Fourth place Graham Rahal ran into the back of third place Tony Kanaan, sending Kanaan spinning. Muñoz was promoted into third after Rahal received a 30-second time penalty post-race for avoidable contact. Huertas' victory marked the first time a rookie had won an IndyCar race since Rahal at the 2008 Honda Grand Prix of St. Petersburg.

=== Round 10: Houston (Sun.) ===
Simon Pagenaud led the final 43 laps to win the second race of the Houston doubleheader, for his second victory of the season. Pagenaud's teammate, rookie Mikhail Aleshin, finished second giving Schmidt Peterson Motorsports its first 1–2 finish in IndyCar competition. Points leader Will Power was running third in the closing laps, but a broken suspension with less than two laps to go, dropped him to 11th at the finish.

=== Round 11: Pocono ===
Juan Pablo Montoya, who returned to Indy car racing after six seasons in Formula One and seven seasons in NASCAR, won his first Indy car race since the 2000 CART season. Montoya led a total of 45 laps, and assumed the lead for the final time with three laps to go. In the closing laps, most of the leaders needed one final pit stop for fuel, but both Josef Newgarden and Tony Kanaan tried to stay out and gamble for a late yellow. Neither were able to make it to the finish, and Montoya assumed the lead when Kanaan ducked into the pits on lap 197.

Montoya's Penske teammate Hélio Castroneves finished second, and left the race in a tie for the points lead with Will Power. Power led 69 laps, and was in the lead group, but two blocking incidents – the first clipping off Montoya's wingplate, and the second a double move on Castroneves – earned him a drive-through penalty and took him out of contention. The race went caution-free for the first 158 laps, with the only incident being a spin by Graham Rahal exiting the tunnel turn. The average speed of 202.402 miles per hour (325.734 kilometres per hour) set the record for the fastest 500 mile race in Indy car history.

=== Round 12: Iowa ===
Tony Kanaan dominated the race, leading 247 laps, but Ryan Hunter-Reay took the victory, after passing Kanaan with two laps to go. With Kanaan leading and Ganassi teammate Scott Dixon running second, Juan Pablo Montoya tangled with Ed Carpenter on lap 281, bringing out the final caution. Montoya accused Carpenter of turning down on him while he was attempting a pass in turn three. Carpenter, who was suffering handling difficulties, admitted to taking a low line, but officials did not issue a penalty for the incident.

With under 20 laps to go, Kanaan stayed out on the track under the yellow, while Hunter-Reay, Josef Newgarden, and a handful of other cars pitted for fresh tires. When the green came back out, Hunter-Reay quickly charged through the field, and took the lead with two laps to go. Newgarden followed suit, climbing up to second. Kanaan's loss was the latest in a series of disappointments in 2014. Power fell from 4th to 14th during the final six laps after brushing the wall, which caused a tire to lose air pressure.

=== Round 13: Toronto (Sat. & Sun.) ===
The first race of the Toronto doubleheader was scheduled for Saturday afternoon. Rain and standing water on the course prompted officials to postpone the race until Sunday morning. Sébastien Bourdais won his first Indy car race since 2007, and his first as part of the IndyCar Series.

=== Round 14: Toronto (Sun.) ===
The second race of the Toronto doubleheader was held late Sunday afternoon. Mike Conway was the winner. Tony Kanaan had two podium finishes on the same day. He finished third in the morning race and second to Conway in this race.

=== Round 15: Mid-Ohio ===
Scott Dixon won at Mid-Ohio for the fifth time in eight seasons. Dixon became the tenth different winner in 2014, and the race was the first win of the season for Ganassi Racing. Polesitter Sébastien Bourdais led the early stages of the race, and Dixon, who started last after spinning out during qualifying, worked his way to the front off-sequence in pit stops from the other leaders. Dixon capitalized on an error by Josef Newgarden during his final pit stop. Newgarden ran over an air hose, tripping a crew member, and was penalized for hitting pit equipment. Tony Kanaan suffered another disappointment, spinning out in the first turn after nearly tangling with other cars at the start. He spun around, and collected Marco Andretti.

The points leader going into the race, Hélio Castroneves, suffered throttle problems on the grid, and joined the race four laps down, and finished a lowly 19th. Will Power departed the race as the new points leader by four points over Castroneves. Third in the standings, Ryan Hunter-Reay, was unable to make up much ground in the championship race after a penalty for speeding in the pits, and later spinning out into the tire barrier.

=== Round 16: Milwaukee ===
Polesitter Will Power dominated the race, leading 229 of 250 laps, taking the victory, his first at Milwaukee. Mired in heavy traffic over the final several laps, Power was able to maintain a two-second lead over teammate Juan Pablo Montoya, who came home second. Tony Kanaan, among the leaders most of the afternoon, rounded out the podium in third place — still win-less on the season. Power departed with a 39-point advantage over Hélio Castroneves in the championship standings with two races remaining.

=== Round 17: Sonoma ===
The morning of the race, an earthquake occurred in the region, but did not alter the schedule for the race. Polesitter and points leader Will Power jumped out to the lead at the start. In turn two, points contender Hélio Castroneves, was involved in a multi-car tangle, requiring a lengthy pit stop for repairs. Power led early, but later suffered a spin in turn seven, and eventually wound up finishing 10th.

Mike Conway passed Tony Kanaan on a restart on lap 40, and led for 19 laps. Towards the end of the race, the leaders were trying to stretch their fuel to the finish. With Conway in conservation mode, Graham Rahal came to the lead, with Scott Dixon and Ryan Hunter-Reay now running third and fourth. Rahal was forced to the pits with three laps to go, handing the lead back to Conway. Going into turn one, Scott Dixon blew by Conway for the lead, and won his second race of the season. Conway ran out of fuel and finished 14th.

Will Power stretched his lead over Hélio Castroneves in the championship standings to 51 points. With one race remaining, four drivers were mathematically in contention for the title; Will Power, Hélio Castroneves, Simon Pagenaud, and Ryan Hunter-Reay. Power could clinch the championship by finishing sixth or better at Fontana.

=== Round 18: Fontana ===
The season concluded with the MAVTV 500 at Auto Club Speedway. Double points were awarded, per new rules for all 500-mile events. Four drivers started the race mathematically alive for the title; Will Power, Hélio Castroneves, Simon Pagenaud, Ryan Hunter-Reay. Very early in the race, Pagenaud was forced to make unscheduled pit stops due to handling problems, and quickly was out of the title picture. The championship at that point became a three-man battle between Will Power, Hélio Castroneves, Ryan Hunter-Reay.

Juan Pablo Montoya led much of the early going, with both Power and Castroneves holding steady in the top ten most of the day. The race was slowed by only one yellow, caused by a spin on lap 175 involving Ryan Hunter-Reay, after that it came down to a two-man race for the championship between Penske teammates Will Power and Hélio Castroneves. Scott Dixon finishes the season 3rd in points, 67 points out of the lead. Juan Pablo Montoya finishes the season 4th in points, 85 points out of the lead. Tony Kanaan finally got his first win of the season, after so many losses, he gets his first since the 2013 Indianapolis 500. With Kanaan comfortably in the lead, the championship battle between Power and Castroneves came down to the final 30 laps. As the leaders cycled through their final green flag pit stops, Castroneves was penalized for an improper entry into pit lane. He was assessed a drive-through penalty, and fell a lap down. Power was able to cruise to the finish line, and his ninth-place finish clinched the drivers' championship title. For the second year in a row, Castroneves finishes the season runner-up and comes home 62 points out of the lead.

== Points standings ==
- Ties in points broken by number of wins, followed by number of 2nds, 3rds, etc., and then by number of pole positions, followed by number of times qualified 2nd, etc.

=== Driver standings ===
- One point is awarded to any driver who leads at least one lap during a race. Two additional points are awarded to the driver who leads the most laps in a race.
- At all races except the Indy 500, the driver who qualifies on pole earns one point.
- Entrant-initiated engine change-outs will result in the loss of ten points.

Pos	Driver	STP	LBH	BAR	IGP	INDY	BEL		TMS	HOU		POC	IOW	TOR		MOH	MIL	SON	CAL	Pts
1	(Australia) Will Power	1*	2	**5**	8	8^{3}	1	2	**2***	14	11	10	14	9	3	6	**1***	**10***	9	671
2	(Brazil) Hélio Castroneves	3	11	19	3	2^{4}	**5***	1*	8	9	**21***	2	8	2	**12***^{c}	19	11	18	**14**	609
3	(New Zealand) Scott Dixon	4	12	3	15	29^{11}	11	4	5	19	18	5	**4**	5	7	1*	4	1	2	604
4	(Colombia) Juan Pablo Montoya	15	4	21	16	5^{10}	12	13	3	2	7	**1**	16	18	19	11	2	5	4*	586
5	(France) Simon Pagenaud	5	5	4	1	12^{5}	22	6	4	**16**	1	6	11	4	22	9	7	3	20	565
6	(United States) Ryan Hunter-Reay	2	**20***	1*	2	1*^{19}	16	19	19	7	6	18	1	21	14	10	21	2	16	563
7	(Brazil) Tony Kanaan	6	18	9	10	26^{16}	3	9	6	13	10	11*	3*	3	2	21	3	13	1	544
8	(Colombia) Carlos Muñoz RY	17	3	23	24	4^{7}	7	8	13	3	22	3	12	17	17	4	22	19	8	483
9	(United States) Marco Andretti	22	8	2	14	3^{6}	10	16	22	8	9	9	18	16	8	22	13	8	11	463
10	(France) Sébastien Bourdais	13	14	15	4	7^{17}	13	20	20	4	5	16	19	**1***	9	**2**	12	11	18	461
11	(Australia) Ryan Briscoe	10	17	11	6	18^{30}	15	10	9	12	8	4	9	12	11	8	6	17	7	461
12	(Canada) James Hinchcliffe	19	21	7	20	28^{2}	6	5	14	5*	14	12	6	8	18	3	19	12	5	456
13	(United States) Josef Newgarden	9	19	8	17	30^{8}	20	17	11	20	20	8	2	20	13	12	5	6	10	406
14	(United States) Charlie Kimball	20	23	10	5	31^{26}	9	3	10	18	4	17	10	7	4	7	16	21	12	402
15	(United Kingdom) Justin Wilson	8	16	6	11	22^{14}	4	12	21	10	12	14	13	10	10	15	17	9	13	395
16	(Russia) Mikhail Aleshin R	12	6	22	25	21^{15}	17	7	7	23	2	7	21	11	23	14	8	7	DNS	372
17	(United Kingdom) Jack Hawksworth R	21	15	12	7*	20^{13}	19	14	15	6	3	Wth	15	13	6	16	10	15	15	366
18	(Japan) Takuma Sato	**7**	22	13	9	19^{23}	18	**18**	18	22	19	21	22	23	5	18	15	4	6	350
19	(United States) Graham Rahal	14	13	17	21	33^{20}	2	21	12	11	16	19	7	6	20	5	14	20	19	345
20	(Colombia) Carlos Huertas R	18	10	16	13	17^{21}	8	15	16	1	23	20	20	14	15	17	20	22	21	314
21	(Colombia) Sebastián Saavedra	11	9	18	**23**	15^{32}	14	22	17	15	17	15	17	19	21	20	18	16	17	291
22	(United States) Ed Carpenter					**27**^{1}			1			13	5				9		3	262
23	(United Kingdom) Mike Conway	16	1	14	19		21	11		17	13			15	1	13		14		252
24	(Spain) Oriol Servià		7	20	12	11^{18}														88
25	(United States) Kurt Busch R					6^{12}														80
26	(United States) J. R. Hildebrand					10^{9}														66
27	(United States) Sage Karam R					9^{31}														57
28	(Italy) Luca Filippi R									21	15			22	16					46
29	(Australia) James Davison R					16^{28}														34
30	(Canada) Jacques Villeneuve					14^{27}														29
31	(Canada) Alex Tagliani					13^{24}														28
32	(United States) Townsend Bell					25^{25}														22
33	(United Kingdom) Pippa Mann					24^{22}														21
34	(United Kingdom) Martin Plowman R				18	23^{29}														18
35	(United States) Buddy Lazier					32^{33}														11
36	(France) Franck Montagny R				22															8
Pos	Driver	STP	LBH	BAR	IGP	INDY	BEL		TMS	HOU		POC	IOW	TOR		MOH	MIL	SON	CAL	Pts

Color	Result
Gold	Winner
Silver	2nd place
Bronze	3rd place
Green	4th & 5th place
Light Blue	6th–10th place
Dark Blue	Finished (Outside Top 10)
Purple	Did not finish
Red	Did not qualify (DNQ)
Brown	Withdrawn (Wth)
Black	Disqualified (DSQ)
White	Did Not Start (DNS)
White	Race abandoned (C)
Blank	Did not participate

**In-line notation**
**Bold**	Pole position (1 point; except Indy)
Italics	Ran fastest race lap
*	Led most race laps (2 points)
DNS	Any driver who qualifies but does not start (DNS), earns half the points had they taken part.
^{1–33}	Indy 500 qualifying results, with points awarded for both the first round (33 points for 1st, down to 1 point for 33rd) and the Fast Nine (9 points for 1st, down to 1 point for 9th)
^{c}	Qualifying canceled no bonus point awarded
RY Rookie of the Year
R Rookie

=== Entrant standings ===
- Based on the entrant, used for oval qualifications order, and starting grids when qualifying is cancelled.
- Only full-time entrants, and at-large part-time entrants shown.

Pos	Driver	STP	LBH	BAR	IGP	INDY	BEL		TMS	HOU		POC	IOW	TOR		MOH	MIL	SON	CAL	Pts
1	#12 Team Penske	1*	2	**5**	8	8^{3}	1	2	**2***	14	11	10	14	9	3	6	**1***	**10***	9	671
2	#3 Team Penske	3	11	19	3	2^{4}	**5***	1*	8	9	**21***	2	8	2	**12***^{1}	19	11	18	**14**	609
3	#9 Chip Ganassi Racing	4	12	3	15	29^{11}	11	4	5	19	18	5	**4**	5	7	1*	4	1	2	604
4	#2 Team Penske	15	4	21	16	5^{10}	12	13	3	2	7	**1**	16	18	19	11	2	5	4*	586
5	#77 Schmidt Peterson Motorsports	5	5	4	1	12^{5}	22	6	4	**16**	1	6	11	4	22	9	7	3	20	565
6	#28 Andretti Autosport	2	**20***	1*	2	1*^{19}	16	19	19	7	6	18	1	21	14	10	21	2	16	563
7	#10 Chip Ganassi Racing	6	18	9	10	26^{16}	3	9	6	13	10	11*	3*	3	2	21	3	13	1	544
8	#20 Ed Carpenter Racing	16	1	14	19	**27**^{1}	21	11	1	17	13	13	5	15	1	13	9	14	3	514
9	#34 Andretti / HVM	17	3	23	24	4^{7}	7	8	13	3	22	3	12	17	17	4	22	19	8	483
10	#25 Andretti Autosport	22	8	2	14	3^{6}	10	16	22	8	9	9	18	16	8	22	13	8	11	463
11	#11 KVSH Racing	13	14	15	4	7^{17}	13	20	20	4	5	16	19	**1***	9	**2**	12	11	18	461
12	#8 Chip Ganassi Racing	10	17	11	6	18^{30}	15	10	9	12	8	4	9	12	11	8	6	17	7	461
13	#27 Andretti Autosport	19	21	7	20	28^{2}	6	5	14	5*	14	12	6	8	18	3	19	12	5	456
14	#67 Sarah Fisher Hartman Racing	9	19	8	17	30^{8}	20	17	11	20	20	8	2	20	13	12	5	6	10	406
15	#83 Chip Ganassi Racing	20	23	10	5	31^{26}	9	3	10	18	4	17	10	7	4	7	16	21	12	402
16	#19 Dale Coyne Racing	8	16	6	11	22^{14}	4	12	21	10	12	14	13	10	10	15	17	9	13	395
17	#7 Schmidt Peterson Motorsports	12	6	22	25	21^{15}	17	7	7	23	2	7	21	11	23	14	8	7	DNS	372
18	#98 Bryan Herta Autosport	21	15	12	7*	20^{13}	19	14	15	6	3	Wth	15	13	6	16	10	15	15	366
19	#14 A. J. Foyt Enterprises	**7**	22	13	9	19^{23}	18	**18**	18	22	19	21	22	23	5	18	15	4	6	350
20	#15 Rahal Letterman Lanigan Racing	14	13	17	21	33^{20}	2	21	12	11	16	19	7	6	20	5	14	20	19	345
21	#18 Dale Coyne Racing	18	10	16	13	17^{21}	8	15	16	1	23	20	20	14	15	17	20	22	21	314
22	#17 KV AFS Racing	11	9	18	**23**	15^{32}	14	22	17	15	17	15	17	19	21	20	18	16	17	291
23	#16 Rahal Letterman Lanigan Racing		7	20	12	11^{18}				21	15			22	16					134
Pos	Driver	STP	LBH	BAR	IGP	INDY	BEL		TMS	HOU		POC	IOW	TOR		MOH	MIL	SON	CAL	Pts

=== Manufacturer standings ===
Pos	Manufacturer	STP	LBH	BAR	INDY			BEL		TMS	HOU		POC	IOW	TOR		MOH	MIL	SON	CAL	Bonus	Pen.	Pts
Pos	Manufacturer	STP	LBH	BAR	IMS	QL	500	BEL		TMS	HOU		POC	IOW	TOR		MOH	MIL	SON	CAL	Bonus	Pen.	Pts
1	Chevrolet	122*	125	**69**	**100**	115	**146**	**122***	162*	**161***	72	**66***	**311***	**103***	**160***	**162***	**95***	**164***	**88***	**323***	140	70	2736
2	Honda	**72**	**70***	127*	97*	75	241*	75	**36**	32	**123***	127	71	91	33	32	103	30	110	63	80	140	1548
Pos	Manufacturer	STP	LBH	BAR	IMS	QL	500	BEL		TMS	HOU		POC	IOW	TOR		MOH	MIL	SON	CAL	Bonus	Pen.	Pts
Pos	Manufacturer	STP	LBH	BAR	INDY			BEL		TMS	HOU		POC	IOW	TOR		MOH	MIL	SON	CAL	Bonus	Pen.	Pts

- The top five finishing drivers in each race/qualifying score points for their respective engine manufacturer, provided they were using one of their four allotted engines.
- One point is awarded to the manufacturer for each of their entrants who leads at least one lap during a race. Two additional points are awarded to the manufacturer if one of their entrants leads the most laps in a race.
- At all races except the Indy 500, the manufacturer who qualifies on pole earns one point.
- Manufacturers will earn ten points for each engine that reaches the 2500-mile change-out threshold. Manufacturers will lose ten points for each engine that does not reach the change-out threshold, or for each engine used over the four-engine allotment per entrant.
- Ties in points broken by number of wins, followed by number of 2nds, 3rds, etc., and then by number of pole positions, followed by number of times qualified 2nd, etc.
