= 2014 Grand Prix of Indianapolis =

(United States) 2014 GP Indianapolis
Race details
- 4th round of the 2014 IndyCar Series season
- Date: May 10, 2014
- Official name: Grand Prix of Indianapolis
- Location: Indianapolis Motor Speedway; Speedway, Indiana
- Course: Combined road course 2.439 mi / 3.925 km
- Distance: 82 laps 200 mi / 321.87 km

Pole position
- Driver: (Colombia) Sebastián Saavedra (KV Racing Technology)
- Time: 1:23.8822

Fastest lap
- Driver: (New Zealand) Scott Dixon (Chip Ganassi Racing)
- Time: 1:10.4062 (on lap 76 of 82)

Podium
- First: (France) Simon Pagenaud (Sam Schmidt Motorsports)
- Second: (United States) Ryan Hunter-Reay (Andretti Autosport)
- Third: (Brazil) Hélio Castroneves (Team Penske)

The 2014 Grand Prix of Indianapolis, the inaugural running of the event, was an IndyCar Series race held on May 10, 2014, at the Indianapolis Motor Speedway. The fourth round of the 2014 IndyCar Series season, it was won by Simon Pagenaud of Schmidt Peterson Hamilton Motorsports.

== Report ==
=== Background ===
The race was officially announced on October 1, 2013. The track's road course was formerly used by Formula One for the United States Grand Prix. The track featured various modifications: the track runs clockwise, with turn 1 entering the oval's turn 4 onto the road course. Turns 2 to 4 remain the same, while turn 5 and 6 became a chicane, and entered the Hulman Blvd. straight. Turn 7 is a 90-degree left turn into turns 8 and 9, leading into the oval's turn 2, which serves as the road course's turns 10 and 11. The oval's turn 1 is not entered, as the track follows the MotoGP format, with turns 12 to 14 leading into the front straight. The cars were also modified to fit the track's specifications, with fueling plugs on the opposite side.

A contest was held for fans to design the trophy for the event. Dan Nichols, a California native, beat out 150 other entries.

=== Qualifying ===
Qualifying took place on May 9. Rain had affected the track during the four sessions held. Prior to the Fast Six session, rain escalated, causing a red flag, which delayed qualifying for 20 minutes, before the six cars were sent onto the track. Ryan Hunter-Reay was the fastest during his qualifying attempt, with a lap time of 1:23.8480, but drove into a puddle of water, spinning out, bring out another red flag. As a result, Hunter-Reay was relegated to third, while Sebastián Saavedra was awarded the pole position.

=== Race ===
The race's honorary race starter was Indianapolis mayor Greg Ballard; the event began with a standing start, but as the lights went out, pole-sitter Saavedra stalled, and was later hit by Carlos Muñoz and Mikhail Aleshin.

== Race results ==
Key	Meaning
R	Rookie

Pos	Car #	Driver	Team	Engine	Laps	Status	Pit Stops^{1}	Grid	Laps Led	Points^{2}
1	77	(France) Simon Pagenaud	Sam Schmidt Motorsports	Honda	82	2:04:24.0261	9	4	6	51
2	28	(United States) Ryan Hunter-Reay	Andretti Autosport	Honda	82	+ 0.8906	8	3	18	41
3	3	(Brazil) Hélio Castroneves	Team Penske	Chevrolet	82	+ 1.8244	9	10	15	36
4	11	(France) Sébastien Bourdais	KV Racing Technology	Chevrolet	82	+ 2.5406	9	7	1	33
5	83	(United States) Charlie Kimball	Chip Ganassi Racing	Chevrolet	82	+ 5.3007	9	23		30
6	8	(Australia) Ryan Briscoe	Chip Ganassi Racing	Chevrolet	82	+ 9.1914	10	14		28
7	98	(United Kingdom) Jack Hawksworth R	Bryan Herta Autosport	Honda	82	+ 14.6161	9	2	31	29
8	12	(Australia) Will Power	Team Penske	Chevrolet	82	+ 18.5958	11	5		24
9	14	(Japan) Takuma Sato	A. J. Foyt Enterprises	Honda	82	+ 20.9721	10	16		20
10	10	(Brazil) Tony Kanaan	Chip Ganassi Racing	Chevrolet	82	+ 21.4539	10	9		20
11	19	(United Kingdom) Justin Wilson	Dale Coyne Racing	Honda	82	+ 26.4750	9	18	4	20
12	16	(Spain) Oriol Servià	Rahal Letterman Lanigan Racing	Honda	82	+ 29.6561	10	22	7	19
13	18	(Colombia) Carlos Huertas R	Dale Coyne Racing	Honda	82	+ 33.0827	9	17		17
14	25	(United States) Marco Andretti	Andretti Autosport	Honda	82	+ 1:04.2370	11	13		16
15	9	(New Zealand) Scott Dixon	Chip Ganassi Racing	Chevrolet	82	+ 1:08.6263	9	6		15
16	2	(Colombia) Juan Pablo Montoya	Team Penske	Chevrolet	81	+ 1 Lap	9	8		14
17	67	(United States) Josef Newgarden	Sarah Fisher Hartman Racing	Honda	80	+ 2 Laps	10	15		13
18	41	(United Kingdom) Martin Plowman R	A. J. Foyt Enterprises	Honda	80	+ 2 Laps	12	20		12
19	20	(United Kingdom) Mike Conway	Ed Carpenter Racing	Chevrolet	58	Parked^{3}	5	24		11
20	27	(Canada) James Hinchcliffe	Andretti Autosport	Honda	56	Driver injury^{4}	8	11		10
21	15	(United States) Graham Rahal	Rahal Letterman Lanigan Racing	Honda	50	Crash frontstretch	8	12		9
22	26	(France) Franck Montagny	Andretti Autosport	Honda	47	Crash T7	9	21		8
23	17	(Colombia) Sebastián Saavedra	KV Racing Technology	Chevrolet	0	Crash frontstretch	0	1		8
24	34	(Colombia) Carlos Muñoz R	Andretti Autosport	Honda	0	Crash frontstretch	0	19		6
25	7	(Russia) Mikhail Aleshin R	Sam Schmidt Motorsports	Honda	0	Crash frontstretch	0	25		5

Notes

^{1} Due to the crash on the starting grid, all cars went through pit lane behind the safety car for the first six laps. These passages were counted as pit stops.

^{2} Points include 1 point for leading at least 1 lap during a race, an additional 2 points for leading the most race laps, and 1 point for Pole Position.

^{3} Mike Conway's team ordered him to park the car once he overtook James Hinchcliffe for position on the track by completing 1 more lap than him for an additional point.

^{4} James Hinchcliffe was injured when a piece of debris hit him on the helmet knocking him unconscious. He would make a full recovery & compete in the next round.

Previous race: 2014 Honda Indy Grand Prix of Alabama	IndyCar Series; 2014 season	Next race: 2014 Indianapolis 500
Previous race: None	Grand Prix of Indianapolis	Next race: 2015 Grand Prix of Indianapolis
