= 2014 Honda Indy Toronto =

(Canada) 2014 Honda Indy Toronto
Race details
- 13th round of the 2014 IndyCar Series season
- Date: July 20, 2014
- Official name: Honda Indy Toronto
- Location: Exhibition Place; Toronto, Ontario
- Course: Temporary street circuit 1.755 mi / 2.824 km
- Distance: 65 laps 114.075 mi / 183.586 km
- Weather: Temperatures reaching up to 24.6 °C (76.3 °F)

Pole position
- Driver: (France) Sébastien Bourdais (KV Racing Technology)
- Time: 58.9479

Fastest lap
- Driver: (France) Simon Pagenaud (Schmidt Peterson Motorsports)
- Time: 1:00.6954 (on lap 47 of 65)

Podium
- First: (France) Sébastien Bourdais (KV Racing Technology)
- Second: (Brazil) Hélio Castroneves (Team Penske)
- Third: (Brazil) Tony Kanaan (Chip Ganassi Racing)

The 2014 Honda Indy Toronto was a Canadian open wheel motor race, held as the thirteenth and fourteenth rounds of the 2014 IndyCar Series season. It was the 28th annual edition of the Toronto Indy, and the 29th and 30th IndyCar races to be held at the 1.755-mile (2.824 km) street circuit at Exhibition Place in Toronto, Ontario, Canada. The races were contested over 65 and 56 laps respectively.

== Race background ==
Having successfully hosted a double-header race for the first time in 2013, IndyCar again scheduled two full points races for the Toronto weekend, with race one on Saturday and race two on Sunday.

After rain on Saturday washed out race one of the weekend double bill, IndyCar officials decided to reschedule the two races on Sunday, with race one in the morning and race two in the afternoon. The postponement created the first same-day doubleheader since the 1981 Kraco Twin 125s which were swept by Rick Mears at the Atlanta Motor Speedway.

== Race 1 report ==
Sébastien Bourdais scored pole position for the first race of the weekend. This was Bourdais' first pole since the 2007 Bavaria Champ Car Grand Prix, at Assen. Originally scheduled to be held on Saturday afternoon, the race was held on Sunday morning; Bourdais led 58 of the race's 65 laps to take his first victory since the 2007 Gran Premio Tecate.

=== Round 13 Classification ===
Race 1 - July 20 - 10:30am
Pos	Driver	Team	Engine	Laps	Time/Retired	Pit Stops	Grid	Laps Led	Points^{1}
1	(France) Sébastien Bourdais	KV Racing Technology	Chevrolet	65	1:15:44.3232	2	1	58	54
2	(Brazil) Hélio Castroneves	Team Penske	Chevrolet	65	+3.3408	2	2	1	41
3	(Brazil) Tony Kanaan	Chip Ganassi Racing	Chevrolet	65	+4.8655	2	5		35
4	(France) Simon Pagenaud	Schmidt Peterson Motorsports	Honda	65	+5.4271	4	4	6	33
5	(New Zealand) Scott Dixon	Chip Ganassi Racing	Chevrolet	65	+12.5472	2	9		30
6	(United States) Graham Rahal	Rahal Letterman Lanigan Racing	Honda	65	+15.5804	2	11		28
7	(United States) Charlie Kimball	Chip Ganassi Racing	Chevrolet	65	+28.6978	2	18		26
8	(Canada) James Hinchcliffe	Andretti Autosport	Honda	65	+31.1677	2	8		24
9	(Australia) Will Power	Team Penske	Chevrolet	65	+33.1220	2	23		22
10	(United Kingdom) Justin Wilson	Dale Coyne Racing	Honda	65	+33.7258	2	7		20
11	(Russia) Mikhail Aleshin (R)	Schmidt Peterson Motorsports	Honda	65	+39.0741	2	19		19
12	(Australia) Ryan Briscoe	Chip Ganassi Racing	Chevrolet	65	+43.3621	4	21		18
13	(United Kingdom) Jack Hawksworth (R)	Bryan Herta Autosport	Honda	65	+58.3644	2	15		17
14	(Colombia) Carlos Huertas (R)	Dale Coyne Racing	Honda	65	+58.4969	3	17		16
15	(United Kingdom) Mike Conway	Ed Carpenter Racing	Chevrolet	65	+58.9383	3	13		15
16	(United States) Marco Andretti	Andretti Autosport	Honda	65	+1:01.4298	2	20		14
17	(Colombia) Carlos Muñoz (R)	Andretti Autosport	Honda	65	+1:01.7675	3	14		13
18	(Colombia) Juan Pablo Montoya	Team Penske	Chevrolet	64	+ 1 Lap	3	22		12
19	(Colombia) Sebastián Saavedra	KV Racing Technology	Chevrolet	64	+ 1 Lap	3	16		11
20	(United States) Josef Newgarden	Sarah Fisher Hartman Racing	Honda	63	Crash damage	4	10		10
21	(United States) Ryan Hunter-Reay	Andretti Autosport	Honda	39	Crash damage	2	3		9
22	(Italy) Luca Filippi (R)	Rahal Letterman Lanigan Racing	Honda	17	Crash damage	1	6		8
23	(Japan) Takuma Sato	A. J. Foyt Enterprises	Honda	10	Crash damage	1	12		7
OFFICIAL BOX SCORE UNOFFICIAL LAP REPORT

Notes

^{1} Points include 1 point for leading at least 1 lap during a race, an additional 2 points for leading the most race laps, and 1 point for Pole Position.

(Canada) 2014 Honda Indy Toronto - Race 2
Race details
- 14th round of the 2014 IndyCar Series season
- Date: July 20, 2014
- Official name: Honda Indy Toronto
- Location: Exhibition Place; Toronto, Ontario
- Course: Temporary street circuit 1.755 mi / 2.824 km
- Distance: 56 laps 98.280 mi / 158.166 km
- Weather: Temperatures reaching up to 24.6 °C (76.3 °F)

Pole position
- Driver: (Brazil) Hélio Castroneves (Team Penske)
- Time: Grid set by entrant points

Fastest lap
- Driver: (Colombia) Juan Pablo Montoya (Team Penske)
- Time: 1:00.7896 (on lap 9 of 56)

Podium
- First: (United Kingdom) Mike Conway (Ed Carpenter Racing)
- Second: (Brazil) Tony Kanaan (Chip Ganassi Racing)
- Third: (Australia) Will Power (Team Penske)

== Race 2 report ==
Mike Conway driving for Ed Carpenter Racing won race 2, for his second win of the season after winning Long Beach and it marked the fourth IndyCar victory of his career. Rain fell once again during race 2, with Penske teammates Helio Castroneves and Will Power fighting for the lead early. Conway took advantage of a drying track and pitted on Lap 43 for dry weather tires knowing the slicks would be quicker. Conway took the lead on Lap 51, while Castroneves dropped off the pace, and holding on for the victory.

As of week 2, 2026 it was the last-ever IndyCar Series race victory for British driver to date.

=== Round 14 Classification ===
Race 2 - July 20 - 3:15pm
Pos	Driver	Team	Engine	Laps	Time/Retired	Pit Stops	Grid	Laps Led	Points^{1}
1	(United Kingdom) Mike Conway	Ed Carpenter Racing	Chevrolet	56	1:20:35.5420	4	11	7	51
2	(Brazil) Tony Kanaan	Chip Ganassi Racing	Chevrolet	56	+3.5418	4	9		40
3	(Australia) Will Power	Team Penske	Chevrolet	56	+5.1545	3	2	5	36
4	(United States) Charlie Kimball	Chip Ganassi Racing	Chevrolet	56	+5.4857	3	16		32
5	(Japan) Takuma Sato	A. J. Foyt Enterprises	Honda	56	+6.6210	4	22		30
6	(United Kingdom) Jack Hawksworth (R)	Bryan Herta Autosport	Honda	56	+7.8701	5	18		28
7	(New Zealand) Scott Dixon	Chip Ganassi Racing	Chevrolet	56	+7.9350	3	7		26
8	(United States) Marco Andretti	Andretti Autosport	Honda	56	+10.1765	4	8		24
9	(France) Sébastien Bourdais	KV Racing Technology	Chevrolet	56	+12.0212	3	10		22
10	(United Kingdom) Justin Wilson	Dale Coyne Racing	Honda	56	+15.7853	3	15	5	21
11	(Australia) Ryan Briscoe	Chip Ganassi Racing	Chevrolet	56	+15.8671	3	12		19
12	(Brazil) Hélio Castroneves	Team Penske	Chevrolet	56	+16.2205	3	1	32	21
13	(United States) Josef Newgarden	Sarah Fisher Hartman Racing	Honda	56	+20.9127	3	17	7	18
14	(United States) Ryan Hunter-Reay	Andretti Autosport	Honda	56	+22.6140	4	4		16
15	(Colombia) Carlos Huertas (R)	Dale Coyne Racing	Honda	56	+29.2715	2	20		15
16	(Italy) Luca Filippi (R)	Rahal Letterman Lanigan Racing	Honda	56	+46.4382	3	23		14
17	(Colombia) Carlos Muñoz (R)	Andretti Autosport	Honda	52	Transmission	6	6		13
18	(Canada) James Hinchcliffe	Andretti Autosport	Honda	52	+ 4 Laps	5	13		12
19	(Colombia) Juan Pablo Montoya	Team Penske	Chevrolet	52	+ 4 Laps	6	5		11
20	(United States) Graham Rahal	Rahal Letterman Lanigan Racing	Honda	50	Gearbox	3	19		10
21	(Colombia) Sebastián Saavedra	KV Racing Technology	Chevrolet	49	Misfire	4	21		9
22	(France) Simon Pagenaud	Schmidt Peterson Motorsports	Honda	47	+ 9 Laps	7	3		8
23	(Russia) Mikhail Aleshin (R)	Schmidt Peterson Motorsports	Honda	45	Crash T8	0	14		7
OFFICIAL BOX SCORE UNOFFICIAL LAP REPORT

Notes

^{1} Points include 1 point for leading at least 1 lap during a race, an additional 2 points for leading the most race laps, and 1 point for Pole Position.

== Standings after both races ==
Drivers' Championship

Pos	Driver	Points
1	(Brazil) Hélio Castroneves	533
2	(Australia) Will Power	520
3	(United States) Ryan Hunter-Reay	464
4	(France) Simon Pagenaud	462
5	(Colombia) Juan Pablo Montoya	428

- Note: Only the top five positions are included for the driver standings.

Previous race: 2014 Iowa Corn Indy 300	IndyCar Series; 2014 season	Next race: 2014 Honda Indy 200 at Mid-Ohio
Previous race: 2013 Honda Indy Toronto	Honda Indy Toronto	Next race: 2015 Honda Indy Toronto
