= 2014 Firestone 600 =

(United States) 2014 Firestone 600K
Race details
- 8th round of the 2014 IndyCar Series season
- Date: June 7, 2014
- Official name: Firestone 600K
- Location: Texas Motor Speedway
- Course: Permanent racing facility 1.5 mi / 2.4 km
- Distance: 248 laps 372 mi / 595.2 km

Pole position
- Driver: (Australia) Will Power (Team Penske)
- Time: 23.8579 + 24.0005 = 47.8584 seconds 218.896 mph

Fastest lap
- Driver: (Brazil) Tony Kanaan (Chip Ganassi Racing)
- Time: 24.3827 seconds (on lap 138 of 248)

Podium
- First: (United States) Ed Carpenter (Ed Carpenter Racing)
- Second: (Australia) Will Power (Team Penske)
- Third: (Colombia) Juan Pablo Montoya (Team Penske)

The 2014 Firestone 600K was the eighth round of the 2014 IndyCar Series season. It took place on Saturday, June 7. The race was contested over 248 laps at the 1.5-mile (2.4 km) Texas Motor Speedway in Fort Worth, Texas, and was televised by NBCSN in the United States. The race was won by Ed Carpenter.

== Classification ==
Pos	Driver	Team	Engine	Laps	Time/Retired	Pit Stops	Grid	Laps Led	Pts.^{1}
1	(United States) Ed Carpenter	Ed Carpenter Racing	Chevrolet	248	2:01:25.5758; 178.301 mph	5	5	90	51
2	(Australia) Will Power	Team Penske	Chevrolet	248	+ 0.5247	7	1	145	44
3	(Colombia) Juan Pablo Montoya	Team Penske	Chevrolet	248	+ 0.5771	6	4	13	36
4	(France) Simon Pagenaud	Sam Schmidt Motorsports	Honda	248	+ 1.1514	6	6		32
5	(New Zealand) Scott Dixon	Chip Ganassi Racing	Chevrolet	248	+ 2.1510	5	7		30
6	(Brazil) Tony Kanaan	Chip Ganassi Racing	Chevrolet	248	+ 2.4464	5	3		28
7	(Russia) Mikhail Aleshin (R)	Sam Schmidt Motorsports	Honda	247	+ 1 Lap	6	11		26
8	(Brazil) Hélio Castroneves	Team Penske	Chevrolet	247	+ 1 Lap	7	14		24
9	(Australia) Ryan Briscoe	Chip Ganassi Racing	Chevrolet	247	+ 1 Lap	5	13		22
10	(United States) Charlie Kimball	Chip Ganassi Racing	Chevrolet	247	+ 1 Lap	6	15		20
11	(United States) Josef Newgarden	Sarah Fisher Hartman Racing	Honda	247	+ 1 Lap	5	2		19
12	(United States) Graham Rahal	Rahal Letterman Lanigan Racing	Honda	246	+ 2 Laps	7	21		18
13	(Colombia) Carlos Muñoz (R)	Andretti Autosport	Honda	245	+ 3 Laps	8	10		17
14	(Canada) James Hinchcliffe	Andretti Autosport	Honda	244	+ 4 Laps	8	2		16
15	(United Kingdom) Jack Hawksworth (R)	Bryan Herta Autosport	Honda	244	+ 4 Laps	8	20		15
16	(Colombia) Carlos Huertas (R)	Dale Coyne Racing	Honda	244	+ 4 Laps	6	22		14
17	(Colombia) Sebastián Saavedra	KV Racing Technology	Chevrolet	244	+ 4 Laps	7	19		13
18	(Japan) Takuma Sato	A. J. Foyt Enterprises	Honda	238	Fire	6	16		12
19	(United States) Ryan Hunter-Reay	Andretti Autosport	Honda	136	Engine	3	12		11
20	(France) Sébastien Bourdais	KV Racing Technology	Chevrolet	118	Crash T4	3	18		10
21	(United Kingdom) Justin Wilson	Dale Coyne Racing	Honda	118	Crash T4	2	8		9
22	(United States) Marco Andretti	Andretti Autosport	Honda	3	Engine	0	17		8

Notes

^{1} Points include 1 point for leading at least 1 lap during a race, an additional 2 points for leading the most race laps, and 1 point for pole position.

Previous race: 2014 Detroit Belle Isle Grand Prix	IndyCar Series; 2014 season	Next race: 2014 Grand Prix of Houston
Previous race: 2013 Firestone 550	Firestone 600	Next race: 2015 Firestone 600
