= 2014 Firestone Grand Prix of St. Petersburg =

IndyCar racing event

(United States) 2014 St. Petersburg
Race details
- 1st round of the 2014 IndyCar Series season
- Date: March 30, 2014
- Official name: Honda Grand Prix of St. Petersburg
- Location: Streets of St. Petersburg
- Course: Temporary street circuit 1.800 mi / 2.897 km
- Distance: 110 laps 198.000 mi / 318.670 km

Pole position
- Driver: (Japan) Takuma Sato (A. J. Foyt Enterprises)
- Time: 1:01.8686

Fastest lap
- Driver: (Australia) Will Power (Team Penske)
- Time: 1:02.3404 (on lap 95 of 110)

Podium
- First: (Australia) Will Power (Team Penske)
- Second: (United States) Ryan Hunter-Reay (Andretti Autosport)
- Third: (Brazil) Hélio Castroneves (Team Penske)

Chronology
Previous	Next
2013	2015

The 2014 Firestone Grand Prix of St. Petersburg was the first race of the 2014 IndyCar Series season, the race took place on March 30 in St. Petersburg, Florida, on the city's temporary street course. The race was won by Will Power for Team Penske. Ryan Hunter-Reay finished second ahead of Hélio Castroneves, Scott Dixon, and Simon Pagenaud. The top finishing rookie in the race was Mikhail Aleshin, in 12th position.

== Report ==
=== Background ===
Scott Dixon entered this race as the defending series champion, having won his third Indycar title in the 2013 IndyCar Series season from Hélio Castroneves.

This was the first race for 3 Indycar rookies. Jack Hawksworth raced in the number 98 for Bryan Herta Autosport after moving up from the Indy Lights series. Mikhail Aleshin and Carlos Huertas, who both raced in Formula Renault 3.5 in 2013, made their debuts as well, with Aleshin racing for Schmidt Peterson Hamilton Motorsports and Huertas Dale Coyne Racing. Carlos Muñoz was the 4th rookie in the field with 3 Indycar races in the 2013 IndyCar Series season, most notably the 2013 Indianapolis 500.

Returning to American open wheel racing, since his last race in 2000, is Juan Pablo Montoya, the 1999 CART Champion and the 2000 Indianapolis 500 winner. In 2014 he will drive for Team Penske in the number 2 car.

This was also the first race for Chip Ganassi Racing using Chevrolet engines after the switch from Honda, with Tony Kanaan replacing Dario Franchitti, after his career ending crash in the second Houston race last year. Other drivers racing for a new teams are; Ryan Briscoe with Chip Ganassi Racing, Mike Conway with Ed Carpenter Racing, Sébastien Bourdais and Sebastián Saavedra with KV Racing Technology.

== Classification ==
=== Qualifying ===
Pos	Name	Grp.	Round 1	Round 2	Firestone Fast 6
1	(Japan) Takuma Sato	2	1:12.0073	1:03.0131	1:01.8686
2	(Brazil) Tony Kanaan	1	1:13.4961	1:03.2674	1:02.1637
3	(United States) Ryan Hunter-Reay	1	1:13.7241	1:03.1647	1:02.2167
4	(Australia) Will Power	2	1:12.2248	1:03.2183	1:02.3955
5	(New Zealand) Scott Dixon	2	1:12.0083	1:03.3753	1:02.3955
6	(United States) Marco Andretti	1	1:14.7209	1:03.2406	1:02.9595
7	(Colombia) Carlos Muñoz (R)	2	1:12.0603	1:03.3955	
8	(United Kingdom) Jack Hawksworth (R)	2	1:12.1556	1:03.5738	
9	(Australia) Ryan Briscoe	1	1:15.6860	1:03.6206	
10	(Brazil) Hélio Castroneves	1	1:14.8811	1:03.6635	
11	(Colombia) Sebastián Saavedra	2	1:12.3060	1:03.8374	
12	(United Kingdom) Mike Conway	1	1:13.9450	1:03.9618	
13	(France) Sébastien Bourdais	1	1:15.8337		
14	(France) Simon Pagenaud	2	1:12.3741		
15	(Russia) Mikhail Aleshin (R)	1	1:15.9111		
16	(United Kingdom) Justin Wilson	2	1:12.5890		
17	(Colombia) Carlos Huertas (R)	1	1:16.8105		
18	(Colombia) Juan Pablo Montoya	2	1:12.6994		
19	(Canada) James Hinchcliffe	1	2:34.4862		
20	(United States) Charlie Kimball	2	1:13.0048		
21	(United States) Graham Rahal	1	no time		
22	(United States) Josef Newgarden	2	1:13.1170		

=== Race results ===
Pos	Driver	Team	Engine	Laps	Time/Retired	Pit Stops	Grid	Laps Led	Points^{1}
1	(Australia) Will Power	Team Penske	Chevrolet	110	2:06:57.6288	3	4	74	53
2	(United States) Ryan Hunter-Reay	Andretti Autosport	Honda	110	+ 1.9475	3	3		40
3	(Brazil) Hélio Castroneves	Team Penske	Chevrolet	110	+ 7.8716	3	10	2	36
4	(New Zealand) Scott Dixon	Chip Ganassi Racing	Chevrolet	110	+ 15.9685	3	5		32
5	(France) Simon Pagenaud	Sam Schmidt Motorsports	Honda	110	+ 17.3937	3	14		30
6	(Brazil) Tony Kanaan	Chip Ganassi Racing	Chevrolet	110	+ 20.3882	3	2		28
7	(Japan) Takuma Sato	A. J. Foyt Enterprises	Honda	110	+ 20.8561	3	1	33	28
8	(United Kingdom) Justin Wilson	Dale Coyne Racing	Honda	110	+ 21.0622	3	16		24
9	(United States) Josef Newgarden	Sarah Fisher Hartman Racing	Honda	110	+ 21.5544	3	22		22
10	(Australia) Ryan Briscoe	Chip Ganassi Racing	Chevrolet	110	+ 23.9897	3	9		20
11	(Colombia) Sebastián Saavedra	KV Racing Technology	Chevrolet	110	+ 34.4041	3	17		19
12	(Russia) Mikhail Aleshin (R)	Sam Schmidt Motorsports	Honda	110	+ 34.9969	5	15		18
13	(France) Sébastien Bourdais	KV Racing Technology	Chevrolet	110	+ 35.3526	4	13		17
14	(United States) Graham Rahal	Rahal Letterman Lanigan Racing	Honda	110	+ 38.9881	4	21		16
15	(Colombia) Juan Pablo Montoya	Team Penske	Chevrolet	110	+ 40.3350	4	18		15
16	(United Kingdom) Mike Conway	Ed Carpenter Racing	Chevrolet	110	+ 40.9140	4	12	1	15
17	(Colombia) Carlos Muñoz (R)	Andretti Autosport	Honda	110	+ 44.6244	4	7		13
18	(Colombia) Carlos Huertas (R)	Dale Coyne Racing	Honda	110	+ 47.5637	4	17		12
19	(Canada) James Hinchcliffe	Andretti Autosport	Honda	109	+ 1 Lap	3	19		11
20	(United States) Charlie Kimball	Chip Ganassi Racing	Chevrolet	108	+ 2 Laps	4	20		10
21	(United Kingdom) Jack Hawksworth (R)	Bryan Herta Autosport	Honda	83	Contact	3	8		9
22	(United States) Marco Andretti	Andretti Autosport	Honda	82	Contact	3	6		8

Notes

^{1} Points include 1 point for leading at least 1 lap during a race, an additional 2 points for leading the most race laps, and 1 point for Pole Position.

== Championship standings after the race ==
Drivers' Championship standings

Pos	Driver	Points
1	(Australia) Will Power	53
2	(United States) Ryan Hunter-Reay	40
3	(Brazil) Hélio Castroneves	36
4	(New Zealand) Scott Dixon	32
5	(France) Simon Pagenaud	30

Manufacturer standings

Pos	Manufacturer	Points
1	(United States) Chevrolet	122
2	(Japan) Honda	72

- Note: Only the top five positions are included.

Previous race: None	IndyCar Series; 2014 season	Next race: 2014 Toyota Grand Prix of Long Beach
Previous race: 2013 Honda Grand Prix of St. Petersburg	Honda Grand Prix of St. Petersburg	Next race: 2015 Firestone Grand Prix of St. Petersburg
