= 2014 Honda Indy Grand Prix of Alabama =

(United States) 2014 Alabama
Race details
- 3rd round of the 2014 IndyCar Series season
- Date: April 27, 2014
- Official name: Indy Grand Prix of Alabama
- Location: Barber Motorsports Park; Birmingham, Alabama
- Course: Road Course; 2.38 mi / 3.83 km
- Distance: 69 laps 164.22 mi / 264.27 km

Pole position
- Driver: (Australia) Will Power (Team Penske)

Fastest lap
- Driver: (New Zealand) Scott Dixon (Chip Ganassi Racing)
- Time: (on lap of 69)

Podium
- First: (United States) Ryan Hunter-Reay (Andretti Autosport)
- Second: (United States) Marco Andretti (Andretti Autosport)
- Third: (New Zealand) Scott Dixon (Chip Ganassi Racing)

The 2014 Indy Grand Prix of Alabama was the third race of the 2014 IndyCar Series season. The race was run on April 27, 2014 in Birmingham, Alabama, United States at Barber Motorsports Park.

Ryan Hunter-Reay was the winner.

== Race results ==
Pos	Driver	Team	Engine	Laps	Time/Retired	Pit Stops	Grid	Laps Led	Points^{1}
1	(United States) Ryan Hunter-Reay	Andretti Autosport	Honda	69	1:40:43.3337	2	3	40	53
2	(United States) Marco Andretti	Andretti Autosport	Honda	69	+ 1.0364	2	9	1	41
3	(New Zealand) Scott Dixon	Chip Ganassi Racing	Chevrolet	69	+ 1.4286	2	5	1	36
4	(France) Simon Pagenaud	Sam Schmidt Motorsports	Honda	69	+ 2.4350	2	10		32
5	(Australia) Will Power	Team Penske	Chevrolet	69	+ 3.1559	2	1	15	32
6	(United Kingdom) Justin Wilson	Dale Coyne Racing	Honda	69	+ 3.7009	2	16	1	29
7	(Canada) James Hinchcliffe	Andretti Autosport	Honda	69	+ 4.6538	2	2		26
8	(United States) Josef Newgarden	Sarah Fisher Hartman Racing	Honda	69	+ 5.3417	2	4		24
9	(Brazil) Tony Kanaan	Chip Ganassi Racing	Chevrolet	69	+ 6.2513	2	23		22
10	(United States) Charlie Kimball	Chip Ganassi Racing	Chevrolet	69	+ 6.8371	3	17		20
11	(Australia) Ryan Briscoe	Chip Ganassi Racing	Chevrolet	69	+ 7.6182	2	20		19
12	(United Kingdom) Jack Hawksworth (R)	Bryan Herta Autosport	Honda	69	+ 8.5257	2	22		18
13	(Japan) Takuma Sato	A. J. Foyt Enterprises	Honda	69	+ 9.6750	3	14		17
14	(United Kingdom) Mike Conway	Ed Carpenter Racing	Chevrolet	69	+ 10.1933	3	21		16
15	(France) Sébastien Bourdais	KV Racing Technology	Chevrolet	69	+ 11.3198	3	12		15
16	(Colombia) Carlos Huertas (R)	Dale Coyne Racing	Honda	69	+ 12.8894	2	15		14
17	(United States) Graham Rahal	Rahal Letterman Lanigan Racing	Honda	69	+ 13.7182	2	18		13
18	(Colombia) Sebastián Saavedra	KV Racing Technology	Chevrolet	69	+ 14.0955	2	13	11	13
19	(Brazil) Hélio Castroneves	Team Penske	Chevrolet	69	+ 16.1476	4	6		11
20	(Spain) Oriol Servià	Rahal Letterman Lanigan Racing	Honda	68	+ 1 Lap	3	19		10
21	(Colombia) Juan Pablo Montoya	Team Penske	Chevrolet	68	+ 1 Lap	4	8		9
22	(Russia) Mikhail Aleshin (R)	Sam Schmidt Motorsports	Honda	63	Contact	3	11		8
23	(Colombia) Carlos Muñoz (R)	Andretti Autosport	Honda	29	Mechanical	2	7		7

Notes

^{1} Points include 1 point for leading at least 1 lap during a race, an additional 2 points for leading the most race laps, and 1 point for Pole Position.

== Notes ==
1. Race was scheduled for 90 laps but shortened due to time limit.

Previous race: 2014 Toyota Grand Prix of Long Beach	IndyCar Series; 2014 season	Next race: 2014 Grand Prix of Indianapolis
Previous race: 2013 Indy Grand Prix of Alabama	Indy Grand Prix of Alabama	Next race: 2015 Indy Grand Prix of Alabama
