= 2014 Toyota Grand Prix of Long Beach =

(United States) 2014 Long Beach
Race details
- 2nd round of the 2014 IndyCar Series season
- Date: April 13, 2014
- Official name: Toyota Grand Prix of Long Beach
- Location: Streets of Long Beach; Long Beach, California
- Course: Temporary street circuit 1.968 mi / 3.167 km
- Distance: 80 laps 157.44 mi / 253.375 km

Pole position
- Driver: (United States) Ryan Hunter-Reay (Andretti Autosport)
- Time: 1:07.8219

Fastest lap
- Driver: (Brazil) Hélio Castroneves (Team Penske)
- Time: 1:09.0691 (on lap 76 of 80)

Podium
- First: (United Kingdom) Mike Conway (Ed Carpenter Racing)
- Second: (Australia) Will Power (Team Penske)
- Third: (Colombia) Carlos Muñoz (Andretti Autosport)

Chronology
Previous	Next
2013	2015

The 2014 Toyota Grand Prix of Long Beach was the 40th annual running of the Toyota Grand Prix of Long Beach and the second race of the 2014 IndyCar Series season. It took place on April 13, 2014 in Long Beach Street Circuit. It was won by Mike Conway.

== Classification ==
=== Qualifying ===
Pos	Name	Grp.	Round 1	Round 2	Firestone Fast 6
1	(United States) Ryan Hunter-Reay	1	1:08.0667	1:07.9244	1:07.8219
2	(Canada) James Hinchcliffe	1	1:07.9328	1:07.9683	1:07.9403
3	(France) Sébastien Bourdais	1	1:07.9060	1:07.7913	1:07.9580
4	(United States) Josef Newgarden	1	1:08.0558	1:07.9105	1:08.0097
5	(United Kingdom) Jack Hawksworth (R)	2	1:08.0968	1:07.9640	1:08.0525
6	(France) Simon Pagenaud	2	1:08.0761	1:07.8592	1:08.0732
7	(New Zealand) Scott Dixon	2	1:08.0626	1:07.9981	
8	(United States) Marco Andretti	2	1:08.0179	1:08.0930	
9	(Brazil) Hélio Castroneves	2	1:08.1119	1:07.8860	
10	(United Kingdom) Justin Wilson	1	1:07.9777	1:08.1218	
11	(Colombia) Carlos Muñoz (R)	2	1:07.8746	1:08.1506	
12	(Spain) Oriol Servià	1	1:08.3350	1:08.3532	
13	(Brazil) Tony Kanaan	1	1:08.4424		
14	(Australia) Will Power	2	1:08.1159		
15	(Japan) Takuma Sato	1	1:08.5660		
16	(Colombia) Juan Pablo Montoya	2	1:08.3649		
17	(United Kingdom) Mike Conway	1	1:08.5702		
18	(Australia) Ryan Briscoe	2	1:08.3699		
19	(United States) Charlie Kimball	1	1:08.6507		
20	(Russia) Mikhail Aleshin (R)	2	1:08.4321		
21	(Colombia) Carlos Huertas (R)	1	1:08.7051		
22	(Colombia) Sebastián Saavedra	2	1:08.9619		
23	(United States) Graham Rahal	2	1:09.0562		

=== Race results ===
Pos	Driver	Team	Engine	Laps	Time/Retired	Pit Stops	Grid	Laps Led	Points^{1}
1	(United Kingdom) Mike Conway	Ed Carpenter Racing	Chevrolet	80	1:51:41.6418	2	17	3	51
2	(Australia) Will Power	Team Penske	Chevrolet	80	+ 0.9005	2	14		40
3	(Colombia) Carlos Muñoz (R)	Andretti Autosport	Honda	80	+ 1.5591	2	11		35
4	(Colombia) Juan Pablo Montoya	Team Penske	Chevrolet	80	+ 2.0226	3	16		32
5	(France) Simon Pagenaud	Schmidt Peterson Motorsports	Honda	80	+ 2.8169	3	6		30
6	(Russia) Mikhail Aleshin (R)	Schmidt Peterson Motorsports	Honda	80	+ 3.8574	4	20		28
7	(Spain) Oriol Servià	Rahal Letterman Lanigan Racing	Honda	80	+ 4.9621	2	12		26
8	(United States) Marco Andretti	Andretti Autosport	Honda	80	+ 8.1948	4	8		24
9	(Colombia) Sebastián Saavedra	KV Racing Technology	Chevrolet	80	+ 8.9029	3	21	3	23
10	(Colombia) Carlos Huertas (R)	Dale Coyne Racing	Honda	80	+ 24.2295	3	21		20
11	(Brazil) Hélio Castroneves	Team Penske	Chevrolet	80	+ 30.0552	6	9		19
12	(New Zealand) Scott Dixon	Chip Ganassi Racing	Chevrolet	80	+ 30.7310	3	7	22	19
13	(United States) Graham Rahal	Rahal Letterman Lanigan Racing	Honda	79	+ 1 Lap	4	23		17
14	(France) Sébastien Bourdais	KV Racing Technology	Chevrolet	77	+ 3 Laps	5	3		16
15	(United Kingdom) Jack Hawksworth (R)	Bryan Herta Autosport	Honda	77	+ 3 Laps	4	5		15
16	(United Kingdom) Justin Wilson	Dale Coyne Racing	Honda	64	Contact	2	10		14
17	(Australia) Ryan Briscoe	Chip Ganassi Racing	Chevrolet	60	+ 20 Laps	4	18		13
18	(Brazil) Tony Kanaan	Chip Ganassi Racing	Chevrolet	55	Contact	3	13		12
19	(United States) Josef Newgarden	Sarah Fisher Hartman Racing	Honda	55	Contact	2	4	1	12
20	(United States) Ryan Hunter-Reay	Andretti Autosport	Honda	55	Contact	2	1	51	14
21	(Canada) James Hinchcliffe	Andretti Autosport	Honda	55	Contact	2	2		9
22	(Japan) Takuma Sato	A. J. Foyt Enterprises	Honda	55	Contact	3	15		8
23	(United States) Charlie Kimball	Chip Ganassi Racing	Chevrolet	41	Off course	1	19		7

Notes

^{1} Points include 1 point for leading at least 1 lap during a race, an additional 2 points for leading the most race laps, and 1 point for Pole Position.

== Championship standings after the race ==
Drivers' Championship standings

	Pos	Driver	Points
	1	(Australia) Will Power	93
14	2	(United Kingdom) Mike Conway	66
2	3	(France) Simon Pagenaud	60
1	4	(Brazil) Hélio Castroneves	55
3	5	(United States) Ryan Hunter-Reay	54

Manufacturer standings

Pos	Manufacturer	Points
1	(United States) Chevrolet	247
2	(Japan) Honda	142

- Note: Only the top five positions are included.

Previous race: 2014 Firestone Grand Prix of St. Petersburg	IndyCar Series; 2014 season	Next race: 2014 Honda Indy Grand Prix of Alabama
Previous race: 2013 Toyota Grand Prix of Long Beach	Toyota Grand Prix of Long Beach	Next race: 2015 Toyota Grand Prix of Long Beach
