= 2014 MAVTV 500 IndyCar World Championships =

(United States) 2014 MAVTV 500 IndyCar World Championships
Race details
- Race 18 of 18 in the 2014 IndyCar Series season
- Date: August 30, 2014
- Official name: MAVTV 500 IndyCar World Championships
- Location: Auto Club Speedway, Fontana, California
- Course: Permanent racing facility 2.000 mi / 3.219 km
- Distance: 250 laps 500.000 mi / 804.672 km

Pole position
- Driver: (Brazil) (Brazil) Hélio Castroneves (Team Penske)
- Time: 218.540 mph (351.706 km/h)

Podium
- First: (Brazil) (Brazil) Tony Kanaan (Chip Ganassi Racing)
- Second: (New Zealand) (New Zealand) Scott Dixon (Chip Ganassi Racing)
- Third: (United States) (United States) Ed Carpenter (Ed Carpenter Racing)

The 2014 MAVTV 500 IndyCar World Championships was the 18th and final race of the 2014 IndyCar Series season. The event took place on August 30, at the 2.000-mile (3.219 km) Auto Club Speedway in Fontana, California.

== Report ==
Hélio Castroneves of Team Penske won the pole position with a speed of 218.540 mph, the 41st pole of his career. Castroneves' teammate, Will Power, entered the race with the points lead and started 21st.

Tony Kanaan of Chip Ganassi Racing won his first race of the season, while his teammate, Scott Dixon, finished second. Power finished ninth and thus locked up the championship.

Kanaan's average speed was a record for a 500-mile race at Auto Club Speedway, and in two of the three Fuzzy's Triple Crown races in 2014, a new race record was set at the race in 2014.

Previous race: 2014 GoPro Indy Grand Prix of Sonoma	Verizon IndyCar Series; 2014 season	Next race: None
Previous race: 2013 MAVTV 500 IndyCar World Championships	MAVTV 500	Next race: 2015 MAVTV 500
