= 2014 Honda Indy 200 at Mid-Ohio =

The layout of Mid-Ohio Sports Car Course

The 2014 Honda Indy 200 at Mid-Ohio was the fifteenth round to the 2014 IndyCar Series season. Scott Dixon won the race, giving him his fifth Mid-Ohio win in eight seasons.

Previous race: 2014 Honda Indy Toronto	Verizon IndyCar Series; 2014 season	Next race: 2014 ABC Supply Wisconsin 250
Previous race: 2013 Honda Indy 200 at Mid-Ohio	Honda Indy 200	Next race: 2015 Honda Indy 200
