= 2014 ABC Supply Wisconsin 250 =

16th race of the 2014 IndyCar Series

The layout of Milwaukee Mile

The 2014 ABC Supply Wisconsin 250 was the sixteenth round of the 2014 IndyCar Series season, held at The Milwaukee Mile. Will Power dominated and won the race, leading 229 of 250 laps.

Previous race: 2014 Honda Indy 200 at Mid-Ohio	IZOD IndyCar Series; 2013 season	Next race: 2014 GoPro Indy Grand Prix of Sonoma
Previous race: 2013 Milwaukee IndyFest	IndyCar Series at the Milwaukee Mile	Next race: 2015 ABC Supply Wisconsin 250
