= Punta del Este ePrix =

- Punta del Este Street Circuit (2015, 2018)
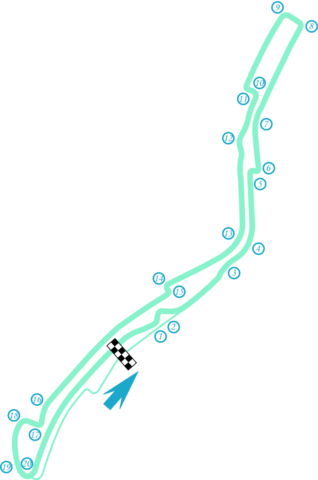

Race information
- Number of times held: 3
- First held: 2014
- Last held: 2018
- Most wins (drivers): (Switzerland) Sébastien Buemi (2)
- Most wins (constructors): (France) Renault e.Dams (2)
- Circuit length: 2.785 km (1.731 miles)
- Race length: 103.045 km (64.029 miles)
- Laps: 37

Last race (2018)

Pole position
- (France) Jean-Éric Vergne; Techeetah; 1:16.806

Podium
- 1. (France) Jean-Éric Vergne; Techeetah; 50:43.809; 2. (Brazil) L. di Grassi; Audi; +0.447; 3. (United Kingdom) S. Bird; DS Virgin; +2.611

Fastest lap
- (Argentina) José María López; Dragon; 1:16.811

The Punta del Este ePrix was an annual race of the single-seater, electrically powered Formula E championship, held in Punta del Este, Uruguay. It was first raced in the 2014–15 season.

== Circuit ==
The original track layout used in the 2014 Punta del Este ePrix.

The Punta del Este ePrix was held on the Punta del Este Street Circuit. It ran along Punta del Este's harbour and was based on a former TC2000 circuit. The track was 2.785 km (1.731 mi) in length and featured 20 turns.

== Results ==
| Edition | Track | Winner | Second | Third | Pole position | Fastest lap | Ref |
|---|---|---|---|---|---|---|---|
| 2014 | Punta del Este Street Circuit | (Switzerland) Sébastien Buemi e.dams Renault | (Brazil) Nelson Piquet Jr. China Racing | (Brazil) Lucas di Grassi; Audi Sport ABT | (France) Jean-Éric Vergne; Andretti | (Germany) Daniel Abt; Audi Sport ABT | |
| 2015 | Punta del Este Street Circuit | (Switzerland) Sébastien Buemi; Renault e.dams | (Brazil) Lucas di Grassi; ABT Schaeffler Audi Sport | (Belgium) Jérôme d'Ambrosio; Dragon Racing | (Belgium) Jérôme d'Ambrosio; Dragon Racing | (Switzerland) Sébastien Buemi; Renault e.dams | |
| 2018 | Punta del Este Street Circuit | (France) Jean-Éric Vergne; Techeetah | (Brazil) Lucas di Grassi; ABT Schaeffler Audi Sport | (United Kingdom) Sam Bird; DS Virgin Racing | (France) Jean-Éric Vergne; Techeetah | (Argentina) José María López; Dragon Racing | |

=== Repeat winners (drivers) ===
| Wins | Driver | Years won |
|---|---|---|
| 2 | (Switzerland) Sébastien Buemi | 2014, 2015 |
