= 2015 Punta del Este ePrix =

Race 3 of 10 of the 2015–16 Formula E season
← Previous race	Next race →
- Layout of the Punta del Este Street Circuit

Race details
- Date: 19 December 2015
- Official name: 2015 FIA Formula E Julius Baer Punta del Este ePrix
- Location: Punta del Este, Uruguay
- Course: Street circuit
- Course length: 2.79 km (1.73 miles)
- Distance: 33 laps, 91.91 km (57.11 miles)

Pole position
Driver	(Belgium) Jérôme d'Ambrosio	Dragon Racing
- Time: 1:15.498

Fastest lap
Driver	(Switzerland) Sébastien Buemi	Renault e.Dams
- Time: 1:17.413 on lap 23

Podium
First	(Switzerland) Sébastien Buemi	Renault e.Dams
Second	(Brazil) Lucas di Grassi	ABT
Third	(Belgium) Jérôme d'Ambrosio	Dragon Racing

First lap of the 2015 Punta del Este ePrix

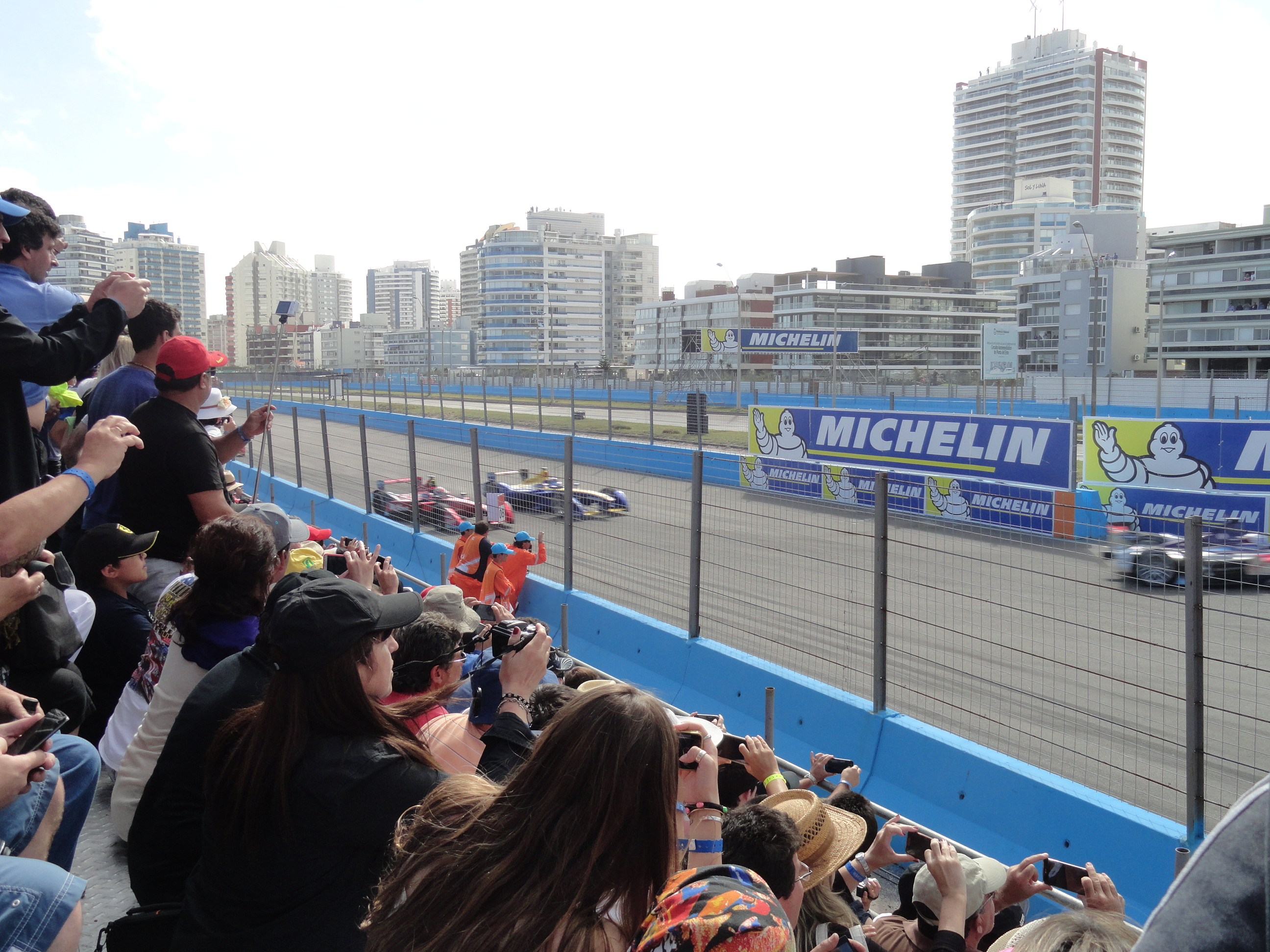
North hairpin at the 2015 Punta del Este ePrix

Podium ceremony at the 2015 Punta del Este ePrix

The 2015 Punta del Este ePrix (officially the 2015 FIA Formula E Julius Baer Punta del Este ePrix) was a Formula E motor race held on 19 December 2015 at the Punta del Este Street Circuit in Punta del Este, Uruguay. It was the second Punta del Este ePrix and the third championship race of the 2015–16 Formula E season, the second season of the single-seater, electrically powered racing car series. The race was won by Swiss driver Sébastien Buemi from team Renault e.Dams.

== Report ==
=== Background ===
For this year, the circuit was slightly modified. The first corner was changed, instead of a right-left chicane it is now left-right. The idea behind this change is to make the pit exit much safer than last year, where the cars were exiting the pits on the racing line.

Mahindra driver Nick Heidfeld missed the event, after undergoing surgery to repair ligament damage in his wrist after a crash at the previous race in Putrajaya. He was replaced by Formula Renault 3.5 champion Oliver Rowland, from Great Britain.

Team Trulli withdrew from the championship after failing to enter their new drivetrain for the first two events. Therefore, only 18 drivers participated in this race and also for the rest of the season.

Venturi driver Jacques Villeneuve crashed in qualifying. His team was unable to repair the damage in time for race day, and the Canadian was subsequently withdrawn.

== Classifications ==
=== Qualifying ===
Pos.	No.	Driver	Team	Time	Gap	Grid
1	9	(Switzerland) Sébastien Buemi	Renault e.Dams	1:15.011		5^{1}
2	11	(Brazil) Lucas di Grassi	ABT Schaeffler Audi Sport	1:15.115	+0.104	4^{1}
3	7	(Belgium) Jérôme d'Ambrosio	Dragon Racing	1:15.481	+0.470	1^{1}
4	6	(France) Loïc Duval	Dragon Racing	1:15.748	+0.737	2^{1}
5	2	(United Kingdom) Sam Bird	DS Virgin Racing	1:15.790	+0.779	3^{1}
6	8	(France) Nicolas Prost	Renault e.Dams	1:15.913	+0.902	6
7	66	(Germany) Daniel Abt	ABT Schaeffler Audi Sport	1:15.993	+0.982	7
8	55	(Portugal) António Félix da Costa	Team Aguri	1:16.014	+1.003	8
9	21	(Brazil) Bruno Senna	Mahindra Racing	1:16.048	+1.037	9
10	88	(United Kingdom) Oliver Turvey	NEXTEV TCR	1:16.154	+1.143	10
11	27	(Netherlands) Robin Frijns	Amlin Andretti	1:16.255	+1.244	11
12	1	(Brazil) Nelson Piquet Jr.	NEXTEV TCR	1:16.300	+1.289	12
13	4	(France) Stéphane Sarrazin	Venturi	1:16.353	+1.342	13
14	77	(France) Nathanaël Berthon	Team Aguri	1:17.573	+2.562	14
15	28	(Switzerland) Simona de Silvestro	Amlin Andretti	1:18.281	+3.270	15
16	23	(United Kingdom) Oliver Rowland	Mahindra Racing	1:19.414	+4.403	16
17	25	(France) Jean-Éric Vergne	DS Virgin Racing	1:19.946	+4.935	17
18	12	(Canada) Jacques Villeneuve	Venturi	1:28.451	+13.440	18

Notes:

- ^1 – Final grid position of top five qualifiers determined by Super Pole shootout.

=== Super Pole ===
Pos.	No.	Driver	Team	Time	Gap	Grid
1	7	(Belgium) Jérôme d'Ambrosio	Dragon Racing	1:15.498		1
2	6	(France) Loïc Duval	Dragon Racing	1:15.875	+0.377	2
3	2	(United Kingdom) Sam Bird	DS Virgin Racing	1:16.109	+0.611	3
4	11	(Brazil) Lucas di Grassi	ABT Schaeffler Audi Sport	1:16.635	+1.137	4
5	9	(Switzerland) Sébastien Buemi	Renault e.Dams	1:19.811	+4.313	5

=== Race ===
Pos.	No.	Driver	Team	Laps	Time/Retired	Grid	Points
1	9	(Switzerland) Sébastien Buemi	Renault e.Dams	33	45:59.697	5	25+2^{2}
2	11	(Brazil) Lucas di Grassi	ABT Schaeffler Audi Sport	33	+3.534	4	18
3	7	(Belgium) Jérôme d'Ambrosio	Dragon Racing	33	+6.725	1	15+3^{3}
4	6	(France) Loïc Duval	Dragon Racing	33	+6.807	2	12
5	8	(France) Nicolas Prost	Renault e.dams	33	+21.057	6	10
6	55	(Portugal) António Félix da Costa	Team Aguri	33	+22.410	8	8
7	25	(France) Jean-Éric Vergne	DS Virgin Racing	33	+57.726	17	6
8	66	(Germany) Daniel Abt	ABT Schaeffler Audi Sport	33	+1:00.744	7	4
9	4	(France) Stéphane Sarrazin	Venturi	33	+1:03.559	13	2
10	27	(Netherlands) Robin Frijns	Amlin Andretti	33	+1:03.840	11	1
11	28	(Switzerland) Simona de Silvestro	Amlin Andretti	32	+1 lap	15	
12	88	(United Kingdom) Oliver Turvey	NEXTEV TCR	32	+1 lap	10	
13	23	(United Kingdom) Oliver Rowland	Mahindra Racing	32	+1 lap	16	
14	77	(France) Nathanaël Berthon	Team Aguri	32	+1 lap	14	
Ret	1	(Brazil) Nelson Piquet Jr.	NEXTEV TCR	31	Crash	12	
Ret	21	(Brazil) Bruno Senna	Mahindra Racing	26	Damage	9	
Ret	2	(United Kingdom) Sam Bird	DS Virgin Racing	17	Battery	3	
DNS	12	(Canada) Jacques Villeneuve	Venturi	0	Crash Damage^{4}	—	

Notes:

- ^2 – Two points for fastest lap.
- ^3 – Three points for pole position.
- ^4 – Jacques Villeneuve did not start the race due to the heavy accident during Friday's qualifying session, he had to withdraw.

== Standings after the race ==
Drivers' Championship standings

Pos	Driver	Points
1	(Switzerland) Sébastien Buemi	62
2	(Brazil) Lucas di Grassi	61
3	(Belgium) Jérôme d'Ambrosio	28
4	(United Kingdom) Sam Bird	24
5	(France) Loïc Duval	24

Teams' Championship standings

Pos	Constructor	Points
1	(France) Renault e.Dams	73
2	(Germany) ABT Schaeffler Audi Sport	71
3	(United States) Dragon Racing	52
4	(United Kingdom) DS Virgin Racing	30
5	(India) Mahindra Racing	27

- Notes: Only the top five positions are included for both sets of standings.

Previous race: 2015 Putrajaya ePrix	FIA Formula E Championship; 2015–16 season	Next race: 2016 Buenos Aires ePrix
Previous race: 2014 Punta del Este ePrix	Punta del Este ePrix	Next race: 2018 Punta del Este ePrix
