= 2014 Punta del Este ePrix =

- Race 3 of 11 of the 2014–15 Formula E season
- Layout of the Punta del Este Street Circuit

Race details
- Date: 13 December 2014
- Official name: 2014 FIA Formula E Julius Baer Punta del Este ePrix
- Location: Punta del Este, Uruguay
- Course: Street circuit
- Course length: 2.80 km (1.70 miles)
- Distance: 31 laps, 86.80 km (52.7 miles)

Pole position
Driver	(France) Jean-Éric Vergne	Andretti
- Time: 1:15.408

Fastest lap
Driver	(Germany) Daniel Abt	Audi Sport ABT
- Time: 1:18:451 on lap 22

Podium
First	(Switzerland) Sébastien Buemi	e.dams Renault
Second	(Brazil) Nelson Piquet Jr.	China Racing
Third	(Brazil) Lucas di Grassi	Audi Sport ABT

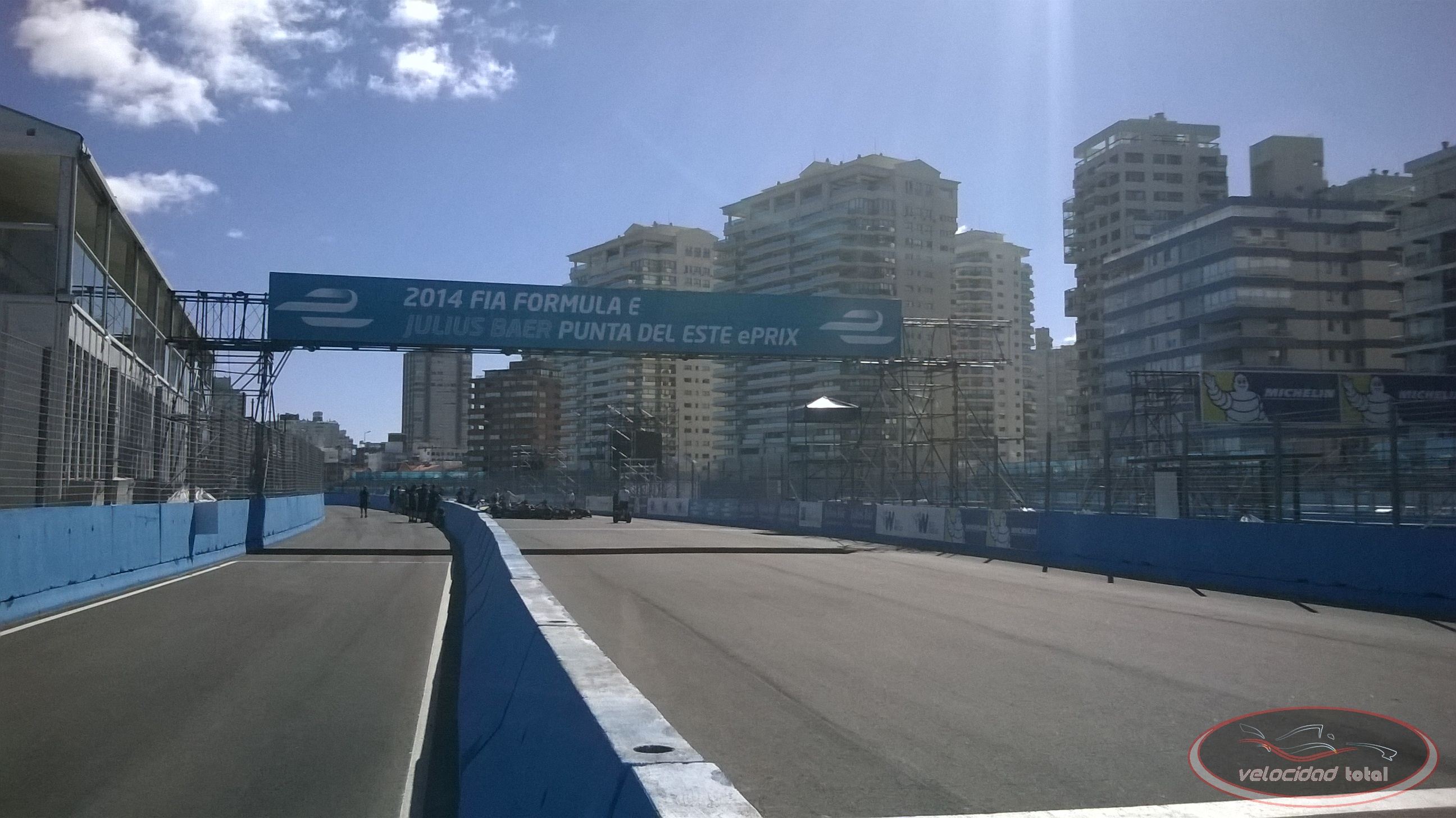
The 2014 Punta del Este ePrix was the first race of the Formula E history in the Americas.

The 2014 Punta del Este ePrix, formally the 2014 FIA Formula E Julius Baer Punta del Este ePrix was a Formula E motor race held on 13 December 2014 at the Punta del Este Street Circuit in Punta del Este, Uruguay. It was the first Punta del Este ePrix and the third championship race of the single-seater, electrically powered racing car series' inaugural season, the first in the Americas.

== Report ==
=== Background ===
Jean-Éric Vergne, Salvador Duran and Antonio Garcia were brought in to replace Franck Montagny, Katherine Legge and Ho-Pin Tung respectively. Vergne, Durán and Nick Heidfeld were voted for to receive the FanBoost.

=== Race ===
Jean-Éric Vergne started on pole position. Behind him were Nelson Piquet Jr., Nicolas Prost, and Sébastien Buemi. Piquet immediately overtook Vergne and Buemi overtook Prost, while the whole field safely squeezed through the first chicane. Nick Heidfeld used his FanBoost and went up to fifth position. On the fourth lap, Sam Bird went over a kerb in the first corner and, unable to steer, hit the wall. This brought out the safety car.

Green flags were waved on the sixth lap, but the race was soon neutralized again when Da Costa had to retire on track. After that, Vergne managed to pass Piquet for the lead. Buemi tried to pass him as well, but locked up his front wheels. Both drivers had to use the run-off area, but kept their positions.

On the sixteenth lap, Piquet had fallen back behind both e.dams drivers, and Vergne made his pit stop. Meanwhile, Stéphane Sarrazin's suspension failed when he hit a kerb and he crashed out. This brought out a third safety car. Bruno Senna had hit the wall in the same incident, but managed to switch cars at the same time as his rivals, without losing much time.

On the twentieth lap, Heidfeld was leading the race, but received a drive-through penalty for exceeding the maximum power usage. Nicolas Prost was then penalized in the same manner. This left the top three as Buemi, Vergne, Piquet. A fourth safety car was called on lap 27 when Matthew Brabham crashed exactly like Sarrazin did earlier.

With two laps left to race, Vergne used his FanBoost as soon as the safety car pulled off, but did not manage to take the lead. Buemi, however, cut the chicane and it was debated whether he should relinquish his position. Before any action was carried out, however, Vergne ran out of power and retired. He did score three points for his pole position. Buemi took the victory with Piquet second and Di Grassi third. Further back, Heidfeld used his FanBoost and managed to take tenth position, and with that a championship point, by beating Antonio Garcia to the line by just three hundreds of a second.

== Results ==
=== Qualifying ===
Pos.	No.	Driver	Team	Time	Gap	Grid
1	27	(France) Jean-Éric Vergne	Andretti	1:15.408		1
2	99	(Brazil) Nelson Piquet Jr.	China Racing	1:15.530	+0.122	2
3	8	(France) Nicolas Prost	e.dams-Renault	1:15.722	+0.314	3
4	9	(Switzerland) Sébastien Buemi	e.dams-Renault	1:15.842	+0.434	4
5	3	(Spain) Jaime Alguersuari	Virgin Racing	1:16.053	+0.645	5
6	11	(Brazil) Lucas di Grassi	Audi Sport ABT	1:16.108	+0.700	6
7	10	(Italy) Jarno Trulli	Trulli	1:16.144	+0.736	7
8	23	(Germany) Nick Heidfeld	Venturi	1:16.225	+0.817	8
9	66	(Germany) Daniel Abt	Audi Sport ABT	1:16.374	+0.966	9
10	5	(India) Karun Chandhok	Mahindra Racing	1:16.416	+1.008	10
11	6	(Spain) Oriol Servia	Dragon Racing	1:16.811	+1.403	11
12	55	(Portugal) António Félix da Costa	Amlin Aguri	1:16.865	+1.457	12
13	30	(France) Stéphane Sarrazin	Venturi	1:17.025	+1.617	13
14	88	(Spain) Antonio García	China Racing	1:17.653	+2.245	14
15	77	(Mexico) Salvador Duran	Amlin Aguri	1:17.810	+2.402	15
16	18	(Italy) Michela Cerruti	Trulli	1:20.206	+4.798	16
17	7	(Belgium) Jérôme d'Ambrosio	Dragon Racing	no time		17
18	2	(United Kingdom) Sam Bird	Virgin Racing	no time		18
19	28	(United States) Matthew Brabham	Andretti	no time		19
20	21	(Brazil) Bruno Senna	Mahindra Racing	一	一	20

=== Race ===
Pos.	No.	Driver	Team	Laps	Time/Retired	Grid	Points
1	9	(Switzerland) Sébastien Buemi	e.dams-Renault	31	49:08.990	4	25
2	99	(Brazil) Nelson Piquet Jr.	China Racing	31	+0.732	2	18
3	11	(Brazil) Lucas di Grassi	Audi Sport ABT	31	+2.635	6	15
4	10	(Italy) Jarno Trulli	Trulli	31	+4.163	7	12
5	3	(Spain) Jaime Alguersuari	Virgin Racing	31	+4.698	5	10
6	21	(Brazil) Bruno Senna	Mahindra Racing	31	+5.197	20	8
7	8	(France) Nicolas Prost	e.dams-Renault	31	+6.514	3	6
8	7	(Belgium) Jérôme d'Ambrosio	Dragon Racing	31	+7.567	17	4
9	6	(Spain) Oriol Servia	Dragon Racing	31	+8.646	11	2
10	23	(Germany) Nick Heidfeld	Venturi	31	+10.563	8	1
11	88	(Spain) Antonio Garcia	China Racing	31	+10.594	14	
12	18	(Italy) Michela Cerruti	Trulli	31	+19.617	16	
13	5	(India) Karun Chandhok	Mahindra Racing	31	+54.175	10	
14	27	(France) Jean-Éric Vergne	Andretti	29	Suspension	1	3^{1}
15	66	(Germany) Daniel Abt	Audi Sport ABT	28	+3 laps	9	2^{2}
16	77	(Mexico) Salvador Durán	Amlin Aguri	27	+4 laps	15	
Ret	28	(United States) Matthew Brabham	Andretti	26	Accident	19	
Ret	30	(France) Stéphane Sarrazin	Venturi	15	Suspension	13	
Ret	55	(Portugal) António Félix da Costa	Amlin Aguri	6	Mechanical	12	
Ret	3	(United Kingdom) Sam Bird	Virgin Racing	3	Accident	18	

Notes:

- ^1 – Three points for pole position.
- ^2 – Two points for fastest lap.

== Standings after the race ==
Drivers' Championship standings

Pos	Driver	Points
1	(Brazil) Lucas di Grassi	58
2	(Switzerland) Sébastien Buemi	40
3	(United Kingdom) Sam Bird	40
4	(France) Nicolas Prost	24
5	(Brazil) Nelson Piquet Jr.	22

Teams' Championship standings

Pos	Constructor	Points
1	(France) e.dams-Renault	64
2	(Germany) Audi Sport ABT	62
3	(United Kingdom) Virgin Racing	54
4	(United States) Dragon Racing	36
5	(United States) Andretti	33

- Notes: Only the top five positions are included for both sets of standings.

Previous race: 2014 Putrajaya ePrix	FIA Formula E Championship; 2014–15 season	Next race: 2015 Buenos Aires ePrix
Previous race: N/A	Punta del Este ePrix	Next race: 2015 Punta del Este ePrix
