= 2018 Punta del Este ePrix =

Race 6 of 12 of the 2017–18 Formula E Championship
| ← Previous race | Next race → |

Race details
- Date: 17 March 2018
- Official name: 2018 ABB Formula E CBMM Nobium Punta del Este E-Prix
- Location: Punta del Este Street Circuit, Maldonado Department
- Course: Street circuit
- Course length: 2.785 km (1.731 mi)
- Distance: 37 laps, 103.045 km (64.029 mi)
- Weather: Hot and sunny

Pole position
| Driver | (France) Jean-Éric Vergne | Techeetah-Renault |
- Time: 1:16.806

Fastest lap
| Driver | (Argentina) José María López | Dragon-Penske |
- Time: 1:16.811 on lap 31

Podium
| First | (France) Jean-Éric Vergne | Techeetah-Renault |
| Second | (Brazil) Lucas di Grassi | Audi |
| Third | (United Kingdom) Sam Bird | Virgin-Citroën |

The 2018 Punta del Este ePrix (formally the 2018 ABB Formula E CBMM Niobium Punta del Este E-Prix) was a Formula E electric car race held at the Punta del Este Street Circuit in the Uruguayan city of Punta del Este, on 17 March 2018. It was the sixth round of the 2017–18 Formula E Championship and the third Punta de Este ePrix as part of the FIA Formula E Championship. The 37-lap race was won by Techeetah driver Jean-Éric Vergne from pole position. Lucas di Grassi finished second for Audi and Virgin driver Sam Bird was third.

Vergne won the pole position after di Grassi, Alex Lynn and Oliver Turvey were penalised for exceeding track limits in qualifying and maintained the lead on the first lap. The race was temporarily neutralised between the fourth and sixth laps when officials extracted the car of Nick Heidfeld who stopped with power issues. Vergne led di Grassi at the restart and the latter remained close behind the former in the next 13 laps until the field made mandatory pit stops to change into a second car. Over the remainder of the race, Di Grassi attempted to pass Vergne but the former prevented the latter from doing so and took his second victory of the season and the third of his career.

The result increased Vergne's lead atop the Drivers' Championship to 30 points over Felix Rosenqvist and Bird maintained third place. Sébastien Buemi and Nelson Piquet Jr. did not finish due to car issues but stayed in fourth and fifth positions. Techeetah further extended their Teams' Championship lead to 27 points over Mahindra and Virgin overtook Jaguar for third with six races left in the season.

== Background ==
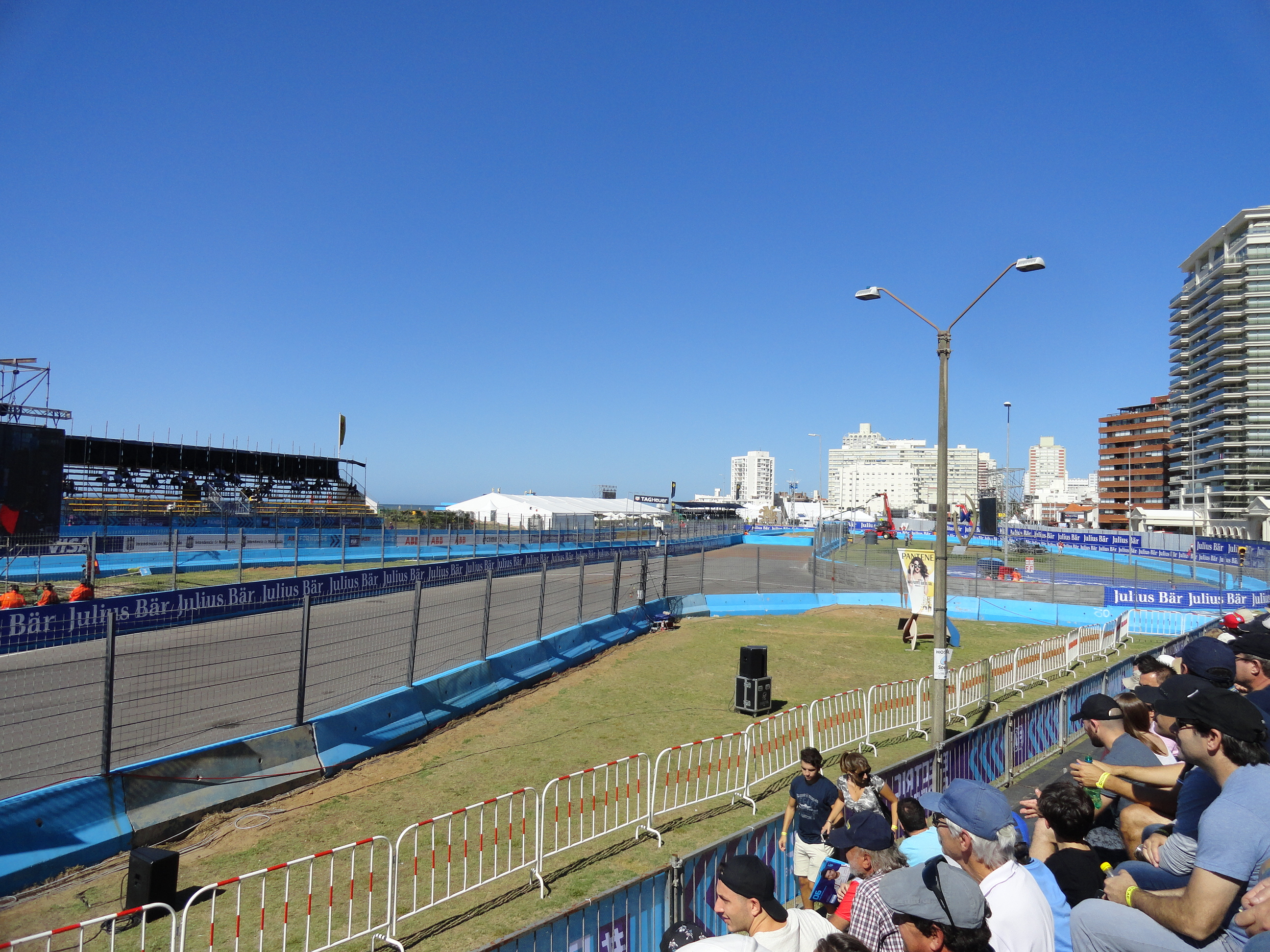
The Punta del Este Street Circuit, where the race was held.

The Punta del Este ePrix, discontinued after the 2015–16 Formula E season because no financial agreement was reached by the Government of Uruguay to keep it going, was announced as part of the Formula E calendar in a meeting of the FIA World Motor Sport Council in Paris on 7 December 2017 after São Paulo authorities requested a cancellation of their planned race due to a delay in selling land to a private owner. The Punta del Este ePrix was part of an alternative plan devised by series founder and CEO Alejandro Agag in case any race was cancelled.

Punta del Este was the sixth of the twelve single-seater electric car rounds of the 2017–18 Championship and the third edition of the event. The race was held on 17 March 2018, at the 20-turn 2.785 km (1.731 mi) Punta del Este Street Circuit, in Uruguay's Maldonado Department. The circuit is situated on the Playa Brava Beach, meaning sand was laid on the tarmac surface and affected the levels of grip available to drivers. Also, the high ambient temperatures strained the car's batteries. Construction of the track started on 24 February, 22 days before the race; and continued for the next three weeks. 370 people were employed to work long shifts to complete the project.

Going into the race, Techeetah's Jean-Éric Vergne led the Drivers' Championship with 81 points, 12 ahead of Felix Rosenqvist of Mahindra in second. Virgin's Sam Bird was third with 61 points with e.Dams-Renault driver Sébastien Buemi a further nine points behind in fourth. Jaguar's Nelson Piquet Jr. was fifth with 45 points. Techeetah led the Teams' Championship with 99 points with the second-placed Mahindra were nine points behind. Jaguar with 94 points and Virgin on 90 points were third and fourth and e.Dams-Renault were fifth with 59 points. There were ten teams entering two participants each for a total of 20 drivers for the ePrix.

The circuit underwent three cosmetic changes after the 2015 race. All bar one of the flexible bollards that were situated around the track in the last two Punta del Este races were removed by officials from the world governing body of motorsport, the Fédération Internationale de l'Automobile (FIA), and the "sausage" kerbing at the entry of the four chicanes was dismantled. However, additional TecPro barriers were erected to improve safety around the track. These changes prompted officials to establish a specific area for drivers to stop in should they miss the turning point for the chicanes before rejoining the track during all sessions. (Note: Drivers were mandated at two of the four chicanes to keep within a blue line designating the area in which they must venture into so they could rejoin the circuit.) The alterations received a mixed reception. Piquet spoke his belief that it would assist drivers attacking the track's high-speed sections. José María López (Dragon) agreed that the kerbing could be negotiated without any major issues and António Félix da Costa (Andretti) praised the "fast and dangerous" nature of the circuit that the changes created. However, the Audi pair of Lucas di Grassi and Daniel Abt called for the further adjustment of the kerbs as they feared the possibility of an accident occurring.

Three days before the race, several drivers, Formula E Teams Association representative and Andretti team principal Roger Griffiths and FIA officials discussed in a meeting procedures of improving the safety of car switches during the mandatory pit stops. It was called after teams were issued clarifications and remainders of pit stop procedures and possibly in response to an injury sustained by a Techeetah mechanic by driver André Lotterer in the preceding Mexico City ePrix. (Note: The minimum pit stop time was discarded at the Santiago round as the FIA believed the best possible time had been achieved but was heavily criticised by drivers who felt safety was compromised.) These clarifications included keeping the steering wheel installed in the driver's first car until it stopped and the FIA wanted all teams not to fully install the safety harness until the driver entered their second vehicle. Additionally, the FIA stressed the responsibility of ensuring the safety of pit stops and seat belt fastening remained with teams and drivers. The FIA also introduced a new regulation authorising stewards to review incidents on and away from the track after races had ended.

== Practice ==
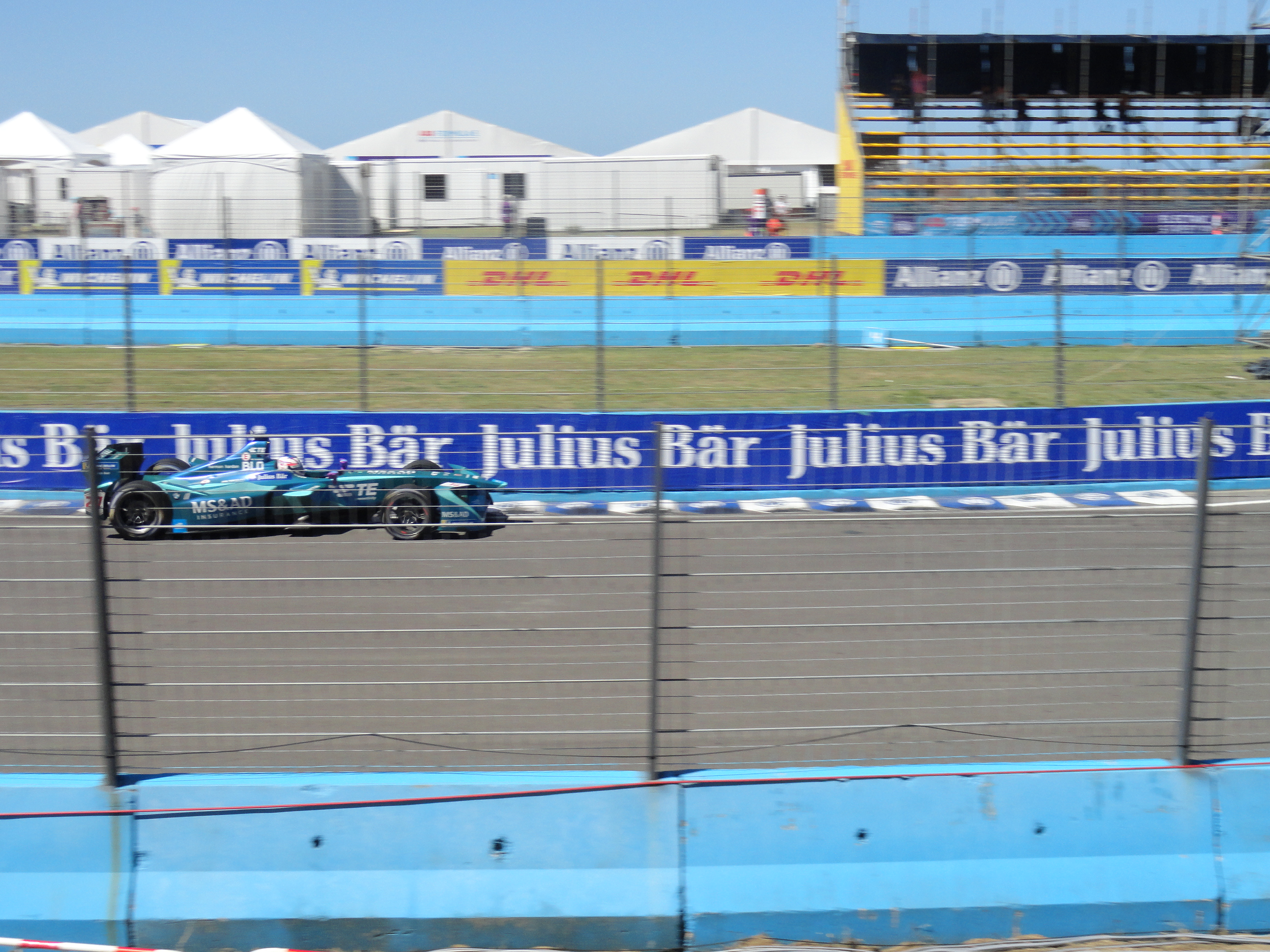
Tom Blomqvist crashed heavily in the second practice session and changed his gearbox after qualifying.

Two practice sessions—both on Saturday morning—were held before the late afternoon race. The first session ran for 45 minutes and the second lasted half an hour. A half hour shakedown session topped by López and di Grassi was held on the Friday afternoon prior to practice to allow teams to check the reliability of their cars and electronic systems. Conditions for the first practice session were cold and the maximum amount of available grip could not be reached because of the sand on the asphalt surface. Buemi used 200 kW (270 hp) of power and set the session's fastest lap at 1 minute, 14.536 seconds, 0.343 seconds faster than anyone else on the circuit. His closest challenger was Mitch Evans (Jaguar) in second with di Grassi third. The rest of the top ten were Alex Lynn (Virgin), Vergne, Bird, Piquet, Oliver Turvey (NIO), Abt and Nico Prost (e.Dams-Renault). During the session, which saw several drivers finding their limits with the track and kerbing and causing them to venture onto the run-off areas, Evans stopped in the entry to the pit lane with a technical problem with ten minutes remaining and required outside assistance for recovery to his garage. Buemi made a driving error, removing his rear wing endplate by glancing a barrier necessitating its replacement.

Di Grassi was fastest in second practice with a new unofficial track record of 1 minute, 13.672 seconds, Bird, Evans, Turvey, Prost, Vergne, Edoardo Mortara (Venturi), Nick Heidfeld (Mahindra), Tom Blomqvist (Andretti) and Lynn filled positions two to ten. Blomqvist possibly broke his right-rear suspension by tapping the turn nine barrier after leaving the corner. An oversteer caused Blomqvist to lose control of the rear of his car and crash against the turn ten and eleven chicane wall after mounting the kerbs, causing the session to be stopped for five minutes. The size of Blomqvist's accident threw his drivetrain onto the track.

== Qualifying ==
Saturday's afternoon qualifying session ran for an hour and was divided into four groups of five cars. Each group was determined by a lottery system and was permitted six minutes of on-track activity. All drivers were limited to two timed laps with one at maximum power. The fastest five overall competitors in the four groups participated in a "Super Pole" session with one driver on the track at any time going out in reverse order from fifth to first. Each of the five drivers was limited to one timed lap and the starting order was determined by the competitor's fastest times (Super Pole from first to fifth, and group qualifying from sixth to twentieth). The driver and team who recorded the fastest time were awarded three points towards their respective championships.

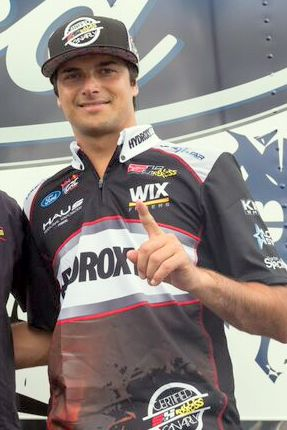
Nelson Piquet Jr. (pictured in 2015) crashed in qualifying and started at the back of the grid.

The first group of five drivers was predicted to be a disadvantage as the circuit was still slippery from the sand being blown from the beaches but had no one make contact with the barriers lining the track. Di Grassi was the early pace setter with Maro Engel, Jérôme d'Ambrosio, Luca Filippi and Blomqvist following in positions two to five. Lynn was the second group's fastest driver despite losing time in the final third of the lap preventing him going quickest overall. Lynn demoted the previous fastest group driver López who made an error on his lap and took third, behind the second-placed Lotterer but ahead of Félix da Costa. Prost was the second group's slowest competitor because he bent his car's steering arm when he hit a trackside bollard, which speared him into the wall at a 45-degree angle at high speed leaving the turn 15 and 16 chicane. His team was required to repair his car for the afternoon's race. In the third group, a vast improvement in track conditions allowed most drivers to go faster than di Grassi in the first two sectors but not overall. Evans led the group with Turvey second. Both demoted Abt to third and Mortara was fourth. The session was disrupted when Heidfeld entered the turn 17 chicane too fast and understeered into a TecPro barrier. This caused Mortara to abandon his first timed lap and was granted dispensation to set a second, which he did not take up.

The fourth group had the first five in the Drivers' Championship eager to compete on the track. Vergne overtook di Grassi to go fastest overall in group qualifying with a lap of 1 minute, 13.672 seconds. Buemi lost momentum in the final third of the lap and was second. Bird was the first driver to attempt a timed lap but slower traffic, understeer, and tapping a wall at turn eight left him third. Rosenqvist was similarly slow and minor contact with the turn nine wall put him fourth. Piquet was set to qualify for super pole but he mounted the kerbing at turn ten and crashed into the barriers. At the end of group qualifying, Vergne, di Grassi, Lynn, Evans and Turvey entered super pole. Di Grassi clinched provisional pole position through a large amount of commitment into the first chicane with a lap of 1 minute, 13.948 seconds but was put under investigation for hitting the bollard at turn 16 and 17. He was joined on the grid's front row by Lynn who damaged his front wing by striking the bollard on his lap. Evans was third-fastest after glancing a wall at turn nine through pushing hard. Turvey in fourth drove methodically through the first chicane though he was almost a second slower than Vergne's fastest group qualifying lap due to him being untidy in the final third of the lap. Turvey was also placed under investigation for hitting the bollard. Vergne was the favourite to take pole position but an error at the start of his lap put him fifth but avoided hitting the bollard.

=== Post-qualifying ===
After qualifying, di Grassi, Lynn and Turvey's lap times were discarded and dropped one place while Evans was demoted to 16th because his car's weight distribution was 300 grams (11 oz) outside the amount permitted. Filippi dropped three places for overspeeding under red flag conditions during practice and Blomqvist started at the back of the grid for changing his gearbox. López was ordered to start from 18th after it was discovered the pressure in two of his tyres were below the minimum mandated amount of 1.60-bar (160 kPa). Mortara originally had a ten-place grid penalty for changing his chassis by damaging it over a kerb in shakedown but annulled it when Venturi determined it could not be fixed sufficiently in Punta del Este and it was shipped to chassis designer Dallara for evaluation and repair. The result of the penalties gave Vergne his third pole position of the season.

=== Qualifying classification ===
Final qualifying classification
| Pos. | No. | Driver | Team | GS | SP | Grid |
|---|---|---|---|---|---|---|
| 1 | 25 | (France) Jean-Éric Vergne | Techeetah-Renault | 1:13.672 | 1:16.806 | 1 |
| 2 | 1 | (Brazil) Lucas di Grassi | Audi | 1:14.032 | — | 2^{1} |
| 3 | 36 | (United Kingdom) Alex Lynn | Virgin-Citroën | 1:14.135 | — | 3^{1} |
| 4 | 16 | (United Kingdom) Oliver Turvey | NIO | 1:14.181 | — | 4^{1} |
| 5 | 66 | (Germany) Daniel Abt | Audi | 1:14.224 | —N/a | 5 |
| 6 | 9 | (Switzerland) Sébastien Buemi | e.Dams-Renault | 1:14.320 | —N/a | 6 |
| 7 | 18 | (Germany) André Lotterer | Techeetah-Renault | 1:14.442 | —N/a | 7 |
| 8 | 5 | (Germany) Maro Engel | Venturi | 1:14.523 | —N/a | 8 |
| 9 | 2 | (United Kingdom) Sam Bird | Virgin-Citroën | 1:14.552 | —N/a | 9 |
| 10 | 7 | (Belgium) Jérôme d'Ambrosio | Dragon-Penske | 1:14.673 | —N/a | 10 |
| 11 | 28 | (Portugal) António Félix da Costa | Andretti-BMW | 1:14.973 | —N/a | 11 |
| 12 | 19 | (Sweden) Felix Rosenqvist | Mahindra | 1:15.104 | —N/a | 12 |
| 13 | 68 | (Italy) Luca Filippi | NIO | 1:15.444 | —N/a | 15^{2} |
| 14 | 4 | (Switzerland) Edoardo Mortara | Venturi | 1:15.493 | —N/a | 13 |
| 15 | 27 | (United Kingdom) Tom Blomqvist | Andretti-BMW | 1:16.624 | —N/a | 20^{3} |
| 16 | 3 | (Brazil) Nelson Piquet Jr. | Jaguar | 1:42.656 | —N/a | 14 |
| 17 | 8 | (France) Nico Prost | e.Dams-Renault | 1:53.358 | —N/a | 19 |
| 18 | 20 | (New Zealand) Mitch Evans | Jaguar | — | — | 16^{4} |
| 19 | 23 | (Germany) Nick Heidfeld | Mahindra | — | —N/a | 17 |
| 20 | 6 | (Argentina) José María López | Dragon-Penske | — | —N/a | 18^{5} |

Notes:

- ^1—Lucas di Grassi, Alex Lynn and Oliver Turvey had their lap times deleted and demoted one place for exceeding track limits during super pole.
- ^2—Luca Filippi dropped three positions for speeding under red flag conditions during the second practice session.
- ^3—Tom Blomqvist started from the back of the grid for changing his gearbox.
- ^4—Mitch Evans had his lap time deleted and was demoted to 16th because his car's weight distribution was 300 g (11 oz) outside the amount permitted.
- ^5—José María López started from 18th as two of his tyres were below the minimum mandated pressure of 1.60-bar (160 kPa).

== Race ==
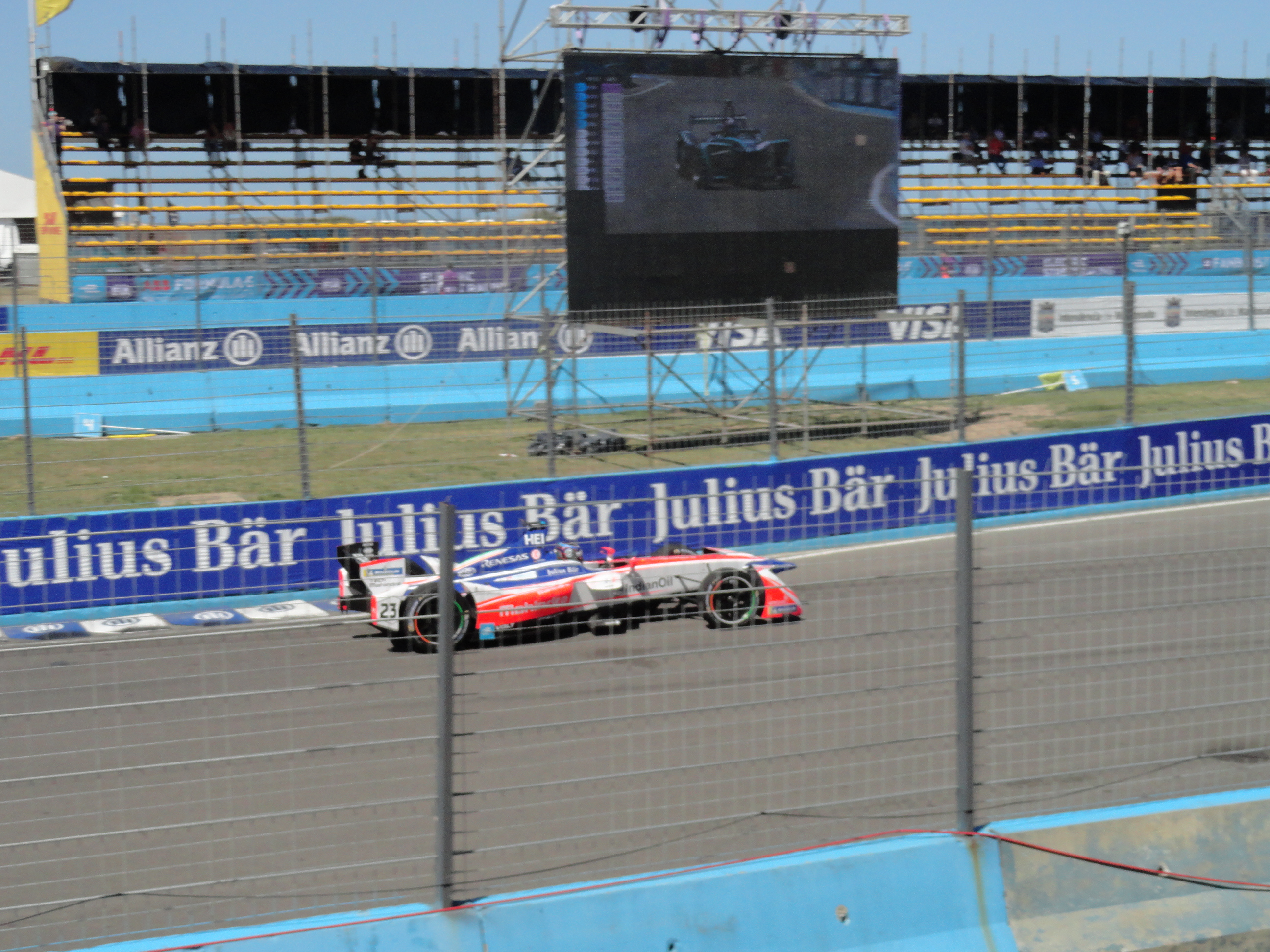
Nick Heidfeld's car lost power on the second lap which prompted the ePrix's sole deployment of the safety car.

The race began at 16:03 Uruguay Time (UTC−03:00) on 17 March. The weather at the start were dry and sunny with the air temperature ranging from 28.85 to 30.56 °C (83.93 to 87.01 °F) and the track temperature between 35.5 and 37.2 °C (95.9 and 99.0 °F). A special feature of Formula E is the "Fan Boost" feature, an additional 100 kW (130 hp) of power to use in the driver's second car. The three drivers who were allowed to use the boost were determined by a fan vote. For the Punta del Este round, Abt, Buemi and Rosenqvist were handed the extra power. The number of laps contested was increased from 33 in 2015 to 37 in 2018 to showcase Formula E's technological developments. Vergne maintained the lead going into the first corner. Di Grassi stayed in second after holding off Lynn and Turvey followed close behind in fourth. The rest of the field negotiated the chicane without incident although Mortara ran wide and fell to 20th. Di Grassi regained some ground and quickly drew closer to Vergne while Turvey was unable to remain with the leaders and Abt began to battle him. Further back, Lotterer and Bird got close to one another in a battle for sixth.

Piquet lost positions to Filippi, Rosenqvist and Evans as he was placed wide at the final chicane and Vergne completed the first lap with di Grassi following closely in second. On the second lap, Bird attacked Lotterer into the turn eight and nine hairpin but the latter blocked his path. Soon after, Heidfeid stopped at the side of the track with a technical system error that shut down his car after leaving the first chicane. Race control offered Heidfeld a small amount of time to restart his car but could not do so while his teammate Rosenqvist overtook Filippi for 12th on the third lap. Meanwhile, Buemi out-braked Bird to pass him for sixth at the turn eight and nine chicane. Buemi slowed to stop him running too deep and prevented Bird from re-passing him. The safety car was deployed on lap four to allow officials to move Heidfeld's car and two drivers made overtakes. Buemi passed Lotterer and Engel likewise overtook Bird but both drivers were not penalised. Vergne led at the lap-six restart with di Grassi second. The pair gradually began pulling away from Lynn. Piquet fell to 20th when his car developed drive train problems due to him hitting a wall earlier in the race.

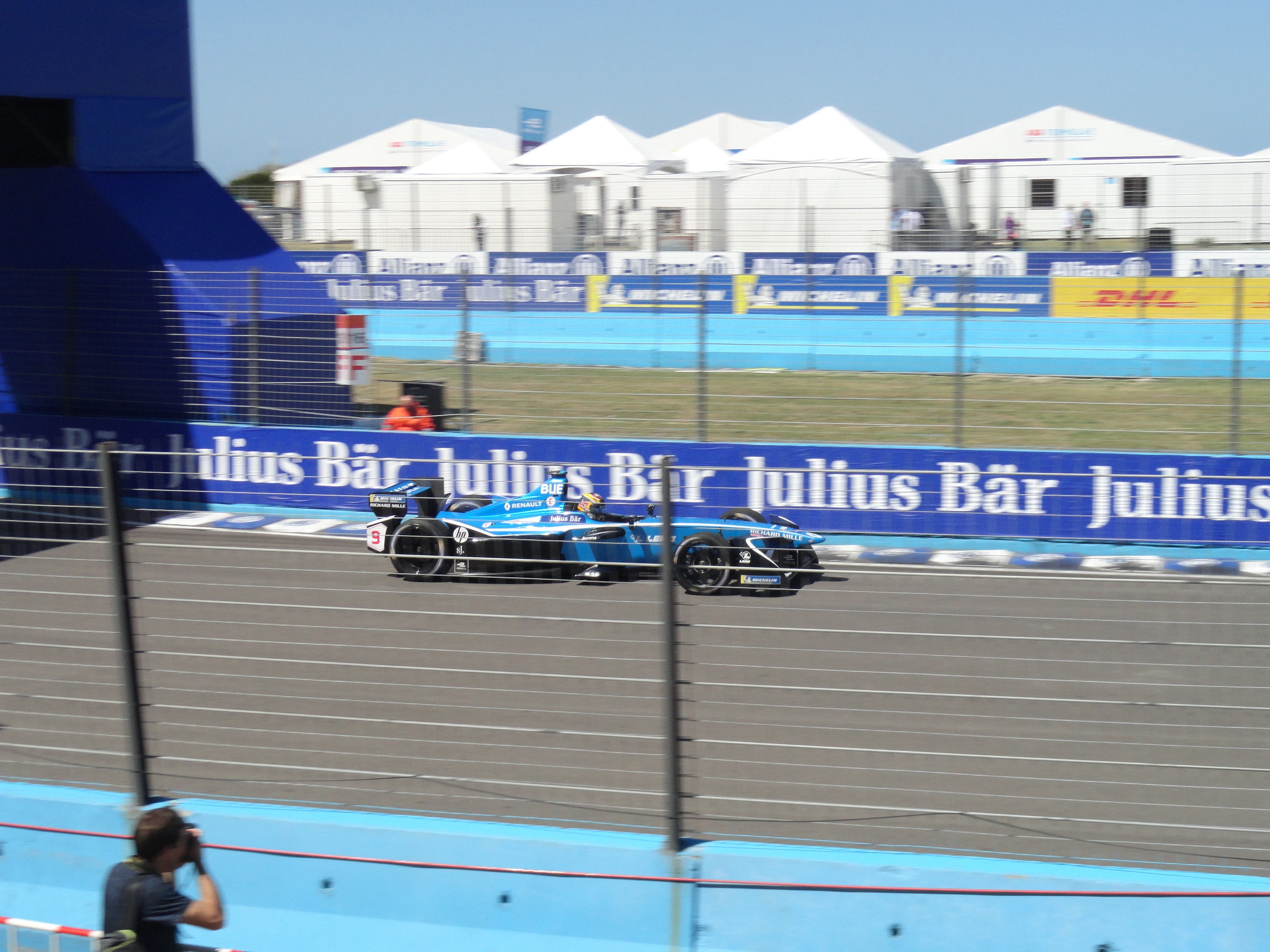
Sébastien Buemi was out of contention for the podium when he damaged his rear-left suspension on lap 11.

Bird got a fast exit leaving the turn one and two chicane, allowing him to draw alongside Lotterer on the inside line entering the turn eight and nine chicane and made the pass for sixth. The manoeuvre's effectiveness lost Lotterer four places to Engel, Félix da Costa and Rosenqvist within two laps. On lap 11, Buemi was out of contention for a strong result when he made an error that put him wide onto the dusty line and into a wall. Buemi's barrier glance deranged his left-rear suspension rod and he entered the pit lane to get into his second car on the following lap since the problem had worsened. Rosenqvist overtook Félix da Costa and d'Ambrosio to move into the top ten soon after. Meanwhile, Abt passed Turvey for fourth and Engel overtook Rosenqvist. After damaging his vehicle on lap nine, Mortara got into his second car on the 16th lap because steering damage necessitated the change, requiring him to conserve electrical energy for the rest of the race. As Turvey saved electrical energy, Bird overtook him for fifth place and Abt passed Lynn soon after.

Vergne was affected by radio communication issues that made him uncertain as to how much electrical energy he had left as di Grassi followed close behind but was unable to affect an overtake by the time they entered the pit lane for the switch into their second cars on lap 19 with the majority of the field following suit. López led for one lap before he, d'Ambrosio and Prost made their pit stops on the next lap. After the pit stops, Vergne and di Grassi retained first and second places. Abt was third and Bird left the pit lane alongside teammate Lynn and passed him for fourth. Similarly, Rosenqvist and Evans moved to fifth and sixth. Di Grassi attempted to pass Vergne on the left into turn 17 on his first lap out of the pit lane and the two briefly made contact, causing di Grassi to lock his brakes and go sideways. Di Grassi lost almost two seconds of time but began closing back up to Vergne. Two laps later, Bird pressured Abt and the battle continued until Abt entered the pit lane on lap 23 because his seat belts unbuckled under braking though post-race data confirmed that the shoulder harnesses were correctly fitted. Abt rejoined in 15th after Bird took over third.

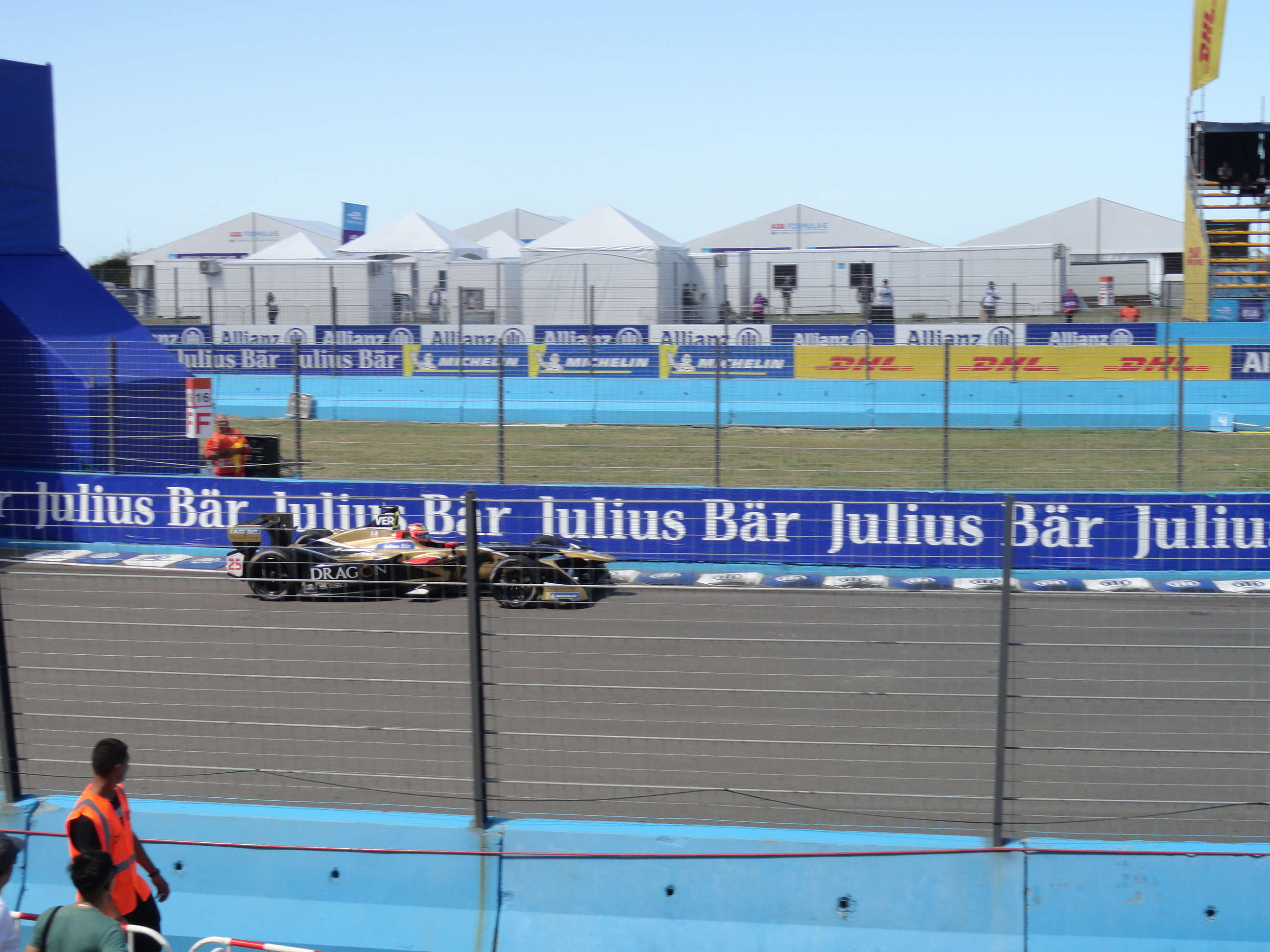
Jean-Éric Vergne withstood pressure from Lucas di Grassi for the majority of the race to win his second race of the season.

Before lap 28 ended, Evans overtook Rosenqvist for fifth. Evans latter attempted to repass Rosenqvist by using his FanBoost but was unsuccessful. At the front, di Grassi made several unsuccessful attempts to pass Vergne, allowing Bird to close up. López earned one point for setting the race's fastest lap on lap 31 by setting a time of 1 minute, 16.811 seconds. Two laps later, Lynn lost fourth to Evans who put him onto the dirty side of the track and overtook him on the left through turn 13. Lynn was then left to fend off Rosenqvist. Di Grassi's best opportunity to pass Vergne was denied at the end of lap 34 as he nudged the latter wide at the final corner but was not able to accelerate faster than Vergne on the start/finish straight and gain the lead. The duel for first was the main focus for the rest of the race. It enabled Bird to get his best chance of taking the lead but was denied his opportunity after a minor driver error on the final lap. This along with Bird being required to conserve electrical energy and manage battery temperatures dropped him out of contention.

Di Grassi made one final passing manoeuvre, which saw him gently nudge the rear of Vergne's car approaching the final turn but Vergne maintained the lead on the start/finish line to achieve his second win of the season and the third of his career. Di Grassi finished 0.447 seconds behind in second place and Bird took third. Off the podium, Evans took fourth with Rosenqvist moving past Lynn late in the race for fifth and Turvey was seventh. The Dragon duo of López and d'Ambrosio took eighth and ninth due to their strategy of running one lap longer than the rest of the field and Engel came tenth. Félix da Costa, Lotterer, Filippi, Abt, Prost, Blomqvist and Mortara were the final finishers. Of the other two retirements, Buemi completed 29 laps after he was unable to finish the race due to his early car swap and Piquet's drive shaft failed after 25 laps.

=== Post-race ===
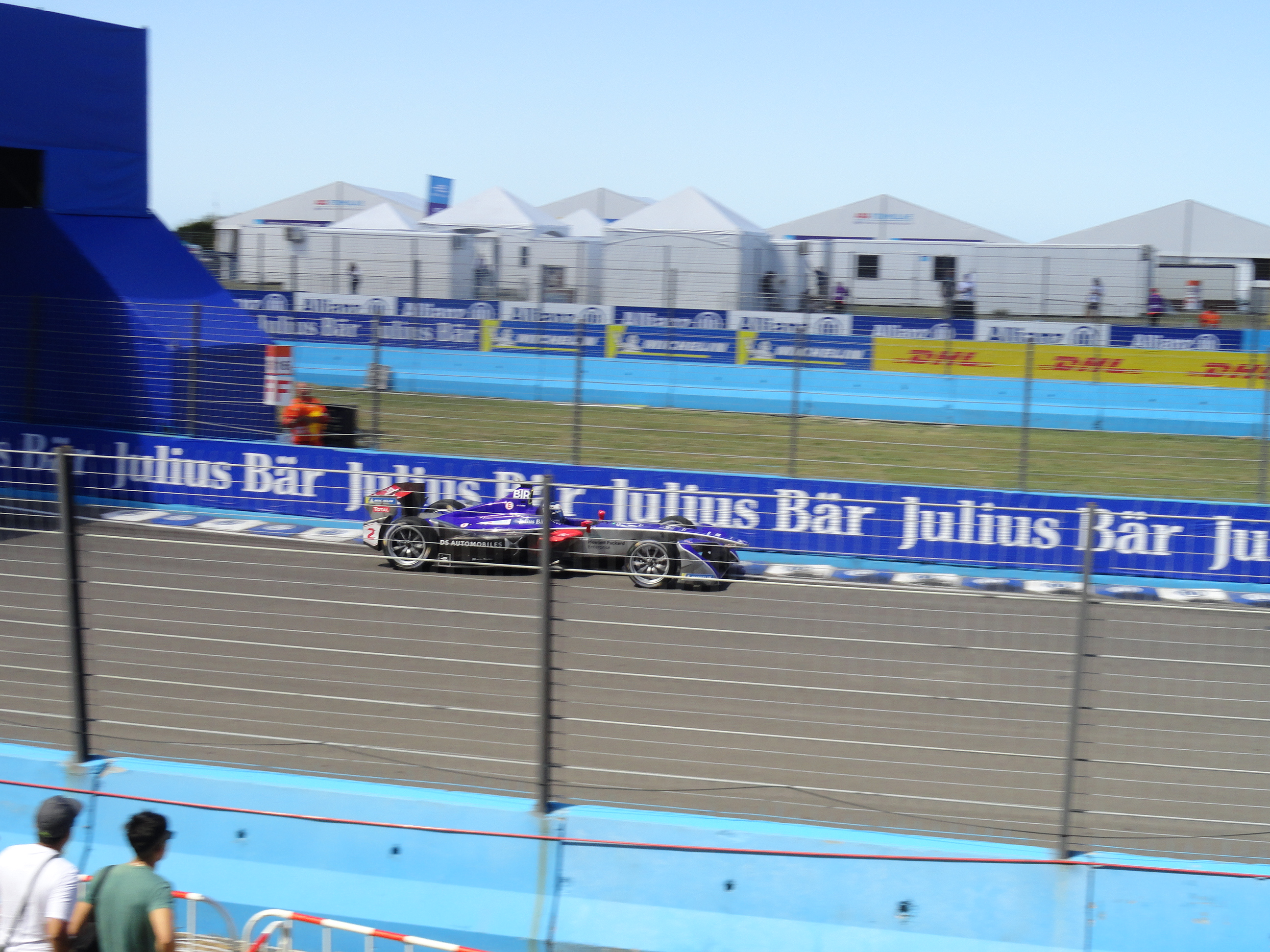
Sam Bird dedicated his third-place finish to broadcaster and motorsports journalist Henry Hope-Frost.

The top three drivers appeared on the podium to collect their trophies and spoke to the media in a later press conference. Vergne remarked the win was possibly "the hardest [of his three victories], and probably the one I'm most happy with in terms of my driving, my whole race", and while his team lacked the resources needed to improve the car, the race demonstrated "the proof to everybody that I have a lot of pace." Second-placed di Grassi spoke of his annoyance over losing pole position which he felt was unfair. While he acknowledged that overtaking was difficult in Punta del Este, he congratulated Vergne for winning, "Today we had the fastest car for pole and to win but we came second." He affirmed that it would not be the last time Audi would contend for victories in the season. Bird dedicated his third-place to broadcaster and motorsports journalist Henry Hope-Frost who was killed in an motorbike accident in the United Kingdom nine days before the race, "There was a lot of fever out there today and I think he’d have been pretty happy with the driving out there today." He spoke of his effort of staying within reach of Vergne and di Grassi and revealed he wanted them to challenge both slightly more to give him an opportunity to win the race.

Di Grassi was summoned to meet the stewards after the race and incurred a €10,000 (£8,750) fine and three penalty points on his race licence for wearing non-compliant fireproof underwear. He was allowed to retain second in what AOL's Andrew Evans described as "one of the strangest racing penalties ever seen." Di Grassi apologised to the stewards, vowed not to repeat the infraction in the future and said Punta del Este's hot weather caused his previous pair to soak up body sweat. The stewards also investigated Abt's seat belt incident but decided that no further action was necessary. Abt was mystified as to how his seat belts became unbuckled in the act of braking, saying, "This we have to figure out, but of course in that situation what do you do? You risk your life or you come in – for me it's no choice." Audi team principal Allan McNish surmised Abt's issue prevented the driver from getting onto the podium but was more positive that his cars finished the race.

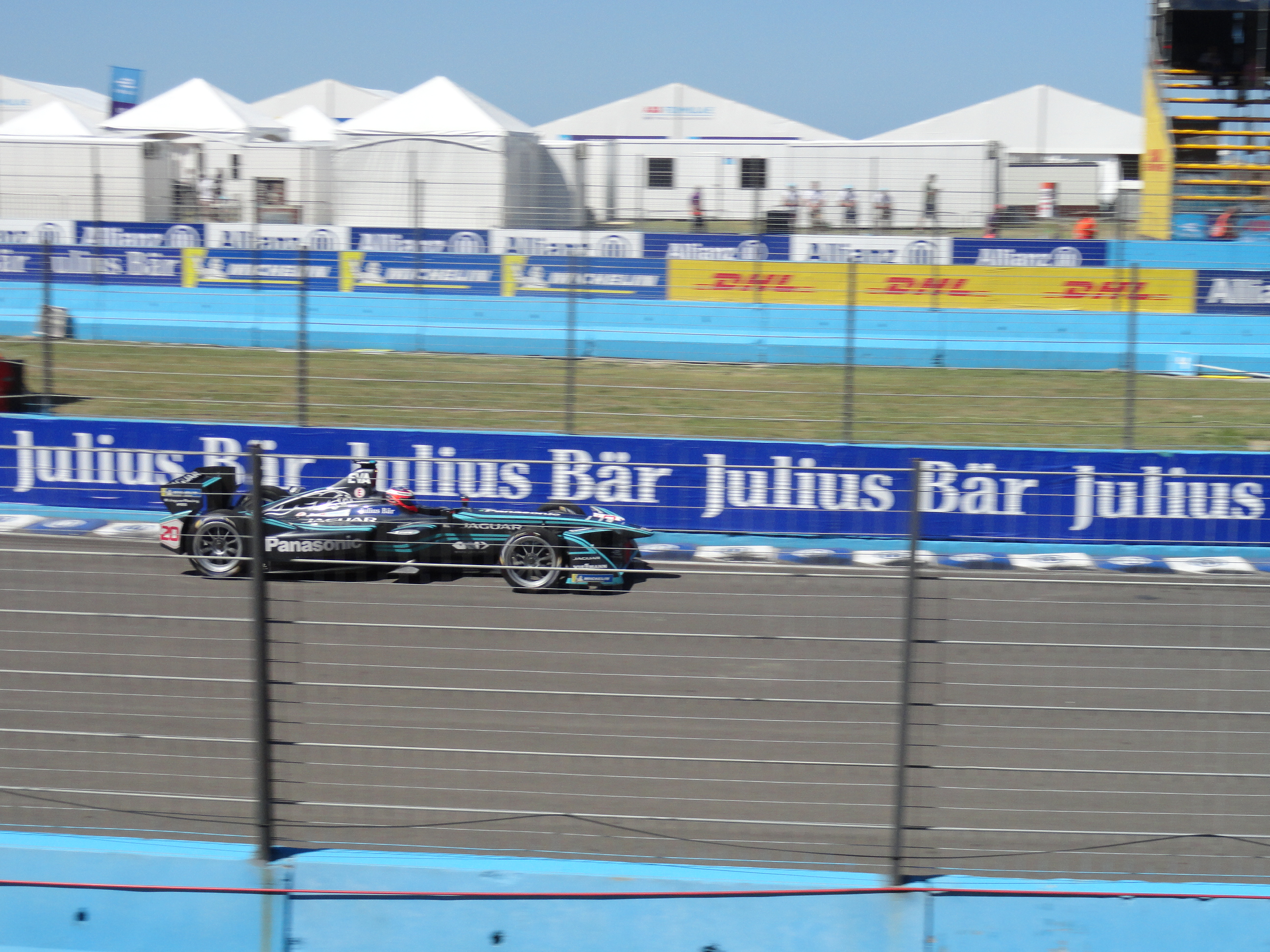
Mitch Evans gained twelve positions off the grid to finish fourth.

Evans reckoned he could have taken his first victory and revealed the weight issue that demoted him to 16th was due to a change of battery between second practice and qualifying being 3 kg (6.6 lb) lighter than the one it replaced, "We can't argue with it – that's the way it rolls. We had a good fast car, and I'm happy to be heading to the next few races hopefully in a position to fight for the win." Evans's view was reiterated by Jaguar team principal James Barclay who praised the driver's fast pace, overtaking abilities and the car, "The reality is, we’ve shown we have the car that’s really fast. I’m not surprised considering how much work we’ve put into it, but it’s really positive to see that we’ve made one of the biggest steps and that’s really good and I’m really proud of the team." Buemi apologised to his team for hitting a wall on lap 11 and stated his belief he could have completed around three or four more laps had the safety car been deployed for a second time.

The consequence of the race further extended Vergne's Drivers' Championship lead to 30 points over Rosenqvist while Bird's third-place finish allowed him to further close up to the latter by five points. Buemi and Piquet remained in fourth and fifth places despite both not finishing the event. Techeetah increased their Teams' Championship lead to 27 points over the second-placed Mahindra while Virgin moved to third place. Jaguar followed a further seven points behind in fourth and e.Dams-Renault maintained fifth position with six races left in the season. Though he reiterated his happiness over winning the race, Vergne admitted he was focused on the championship battle and approached it on a race-by-race basis.

=== Race classification ===
Drivers who scored championship points are denoted in bold.

Final race classification
| Pos. | No. | Driver | Team | Laps | Time/Retired | Grid | Points |
|---|---|---|---|---|---|---|---|
| 1 | **25** | **(France) Jean-Éric Vergne** | **Techeetah-Renault** | **37** | **50:43.809** | **1** | 25+3^{6} |
| 2 | **1** | **(Brazil) Lucas di Grassi** | **Audi** | **37** | **+0.447** | **2** | 18 |
| 3 | **2** | **(United Kingdom) Sam Bird** | **Virgin-Citroën** | **37** | **+2.611** | **9** | 15 |
| 4 | **20** | **(New Zealand) Mitch Evans** | **Jaguar** | **37** | **+4.075** | **16** | 12 |
| 5 | **19** | **(Sweden) Felix Rosenqvist** | **Mahindra** | **37** | **+4.224** | **12** | 10 |
| 6 | **36** | **(United Kingdom) Alex Lynn** | **Virgin-Citroën** | **37** | **+7.672** | **3** | 8 |
| 7 | **16** | **(United Kingdom) Oliver Turvey** | **NIO** | **37** | **+11.818** | **4** | 6 |
| 8 | **6** | **(Argentina) José María López** | **Dragon-Penske** | **37** | **+12.612** | **18** | 4+1^{7} |
| 9 | **7** | **(Belgium) Jérôme d'Ambrosio** | **Dragon-Penske** | **37** | **+22.242** | **10** | 2 |
| 10 | **5** | **(Germany) Maro Engel** | **Venturi** | **37** | **+26.293** | **8** | 1 |
| **11** | 28 | (Portugal) António Félix da Costa | Andretti-BMW | 37 | +27.335 | 11 | |
| **12** | 18 | (Germany) André Lotterer | Techeetah-Renault | 37 | +38.731 | 7 | |
| **13** | 68 | (Italy) Luca Filippi | NIO | 37 | +39.926 | 15 | |
| **14** | 66 | (Germany) Daniel Abt | Audi | 37 | +43.139 | 5 | |
| **15** | 8 | (France) Nico Prost | e.Dams-Renault | 37 | +47.194 | 19 | |
| **16** | 27 | (United Kingdom) Tom Blomqvist | Andretti-BMW | 37 | +59.299 | 20 | |
| **17** | 4 | (Switzerland) Edoardo Mortara | Venturi | 36 | +1 Lap | 13 | |
| Ret | 9 | (Switzerland) Sébastien Buemi | e.Dams-Renault | 29 | Energy | 6 | |
| Ret | 3 | (Brazil) Nelson Piquet Jr. | Jaguar | 25 | Drive shaft | 14 | |
| **Ret** | 23 | (Germany) Nick Heidfeld | Mahindra | 1 | Power | 17 | |

Notes:

- **^6** — Three points for pole position.
- **^7** — One point for fastest lap.

== Standings after the race ==
Drivers' Championship standings

| +/– | Pos | Driver | Points |
|---|---|---|---|
| | 1 | (France) Jean-Éric Vergne | 109 |
| | 2 | (Sweden) Felix Rosenqvist | 79 (−30) |
| | 3 | (United Kingdom) Sam Bird | 76 (−33) |
| | 4 | (Switzerland) Sébastien Buemi | 52 (−57) |
| | 5 | (Brazil) Nelson Piquet Jr. | 45 (−66) |

Teams' Championship standings

| +/– | Pos | Constructor | Points |
|---|---|---|---|
| | 1 | (China) Techeetah-Renault | 127 |
| | 2 | (India) Mahindra | 100 (−27) |
| 1 | 3 | (United Kingdom) Virgin-Citroën | 93 (−34) |
| 1 | 4 | (United Kingdom) Jaguar | 86 (−41) |
| | 5 | (France) e.Dams-Renault | 59 (−68) |

- Notes: Only the top five positions are included for both sets of standings.

== Notes and references ==
=== References ===
| Previous race: 2018 Mexico City ePrix | FIA Formula E Championship; 2017–18 season | Next race: 2018 Rome ePrix |
| Previous race: 2015 Punta del Este ePrix | Punta del Este ePrix | Next race: N/A |
