= Punta del Este Street Circuit =

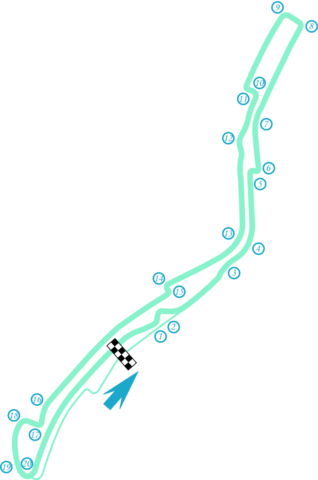
- Formula E Circuit (2015, 2018)
- Location: Punta del Este, Uruguay
- Coordinates: 34°57′17″S 54°56′4″W
- Opened: 1981; Re-opened 1st time: December 2007; 18 years ago Re-opened 2nd time: 15 November 2014; 11 years ago
- Closed: Closed 1st time: December 1991; Closed 2nd time: 21 March 2010; 16 years ago Closed 3rd time: 17 March 2018; 8 years ago
- Major events: Former: Formula E Punta del Este ePrix (2014–2015, 2018); TC2000 (2007–2008, 2010); F3 Sudamericana (1987–1988, 1991)

Formula E Circuit (2015, 2018)
- Length: 2.785 km (1.731 mi)
- Turns: 20
- Race lap record: 1:16.811 ( (Argentina) José María López, Penske EV-2, 2018, F-E)

Formula E Circuit (2014)
- Length: 2.808 km (1.745 mi)
- Turns: 20
- Race lap record: 1:18.451 ( (Germany) Daniel Abt, Spark-Renault SRT_01E, 2014, F-E)

TC2000 Circuit (2010)
- Length: 3.400 km (2.113 mi)
- Turns: 24
- Race lap record: 1:29.288 ( (Argentina) José María López, Honda Civic, 2010, TC2000)

TC2000 Circuit (2008)
- Length: 3.400 km (2.113 mi)
- Turns: 23
- Race lap record: 1:26.058 ( (Argentina) Matías Rossi, Renault Mégane, 2008, TC2000)

TC2000 Circuit (2007)
- Length: 2.650 km (1.647 mi)
- Turns: 21
- Race lap record: 1:22.512 ( (Argentina) Martín Basso, Ford Focus, 2007, TC2000)

Original Circuit (1981–1988, 1991)
- Length: 2.407 km (1.496 mi)
- Turns: 12

Punta del Este Street Circuit was a street circuit located on the seashore of Punta del Este, Uruguay.

The Argentine TC2000 Championship hosted three races at Punta del Este in 2007, 2008 and 2010.

The Formula E has hosted the Punta del Este ePrix at the venue. The first edition was held on 13 December 2014 during the 2014–15 season. The track had 2.808 km (1.745 mi) in length and featured 20 turns.

For season two, the circuit was slightly modified. The first corner was changed, instead of a right-left chicane it is now left-right. The idea behind this change is to make the pit exit much safer than last year, where the cars were exiting the pits on the racing line. This also slightly reduced the lap length to 2.785 km (1.731 mi).

== Lap records ==
The fastest official race lap records at the Punta del Este Street Circuit are listed as:

Category	Time	Driver	Vehicle	Event	Circuit Map
Formula E Circuit (2015, 2018): 2.785 km (1.731 mi)
Formula E	1:16.811	José María López	Penske EV-2	2018 Punta del Este ePrix	
Formula E Circuit (2014): 2.808 km (1.745 mi)
Formula E	1:18.451	Daniel Abt	Spark-Renault SRT_01E	2014 Punta del Este ePrix	
TC2000 Circuit (2010): 3.400 km (2.113 mi)
TC2000	1:29.288	José María López	Honda Civic	2010 Punta del Este TC2000 round	
TC2000 Circuit (2008): 3.400 km (2.113 mi)
TC2000	1:26.058	Matías Rossi	Renault Mégane	2008 Punta del Este TC2000 round	
TC2000 Circuit (2007): 2.650 km (1.647 mi)
TC2000	1:22.512	Martín Basso	Ford Focus	2007 Punta del Este TC2000 round	

== Gallery ==
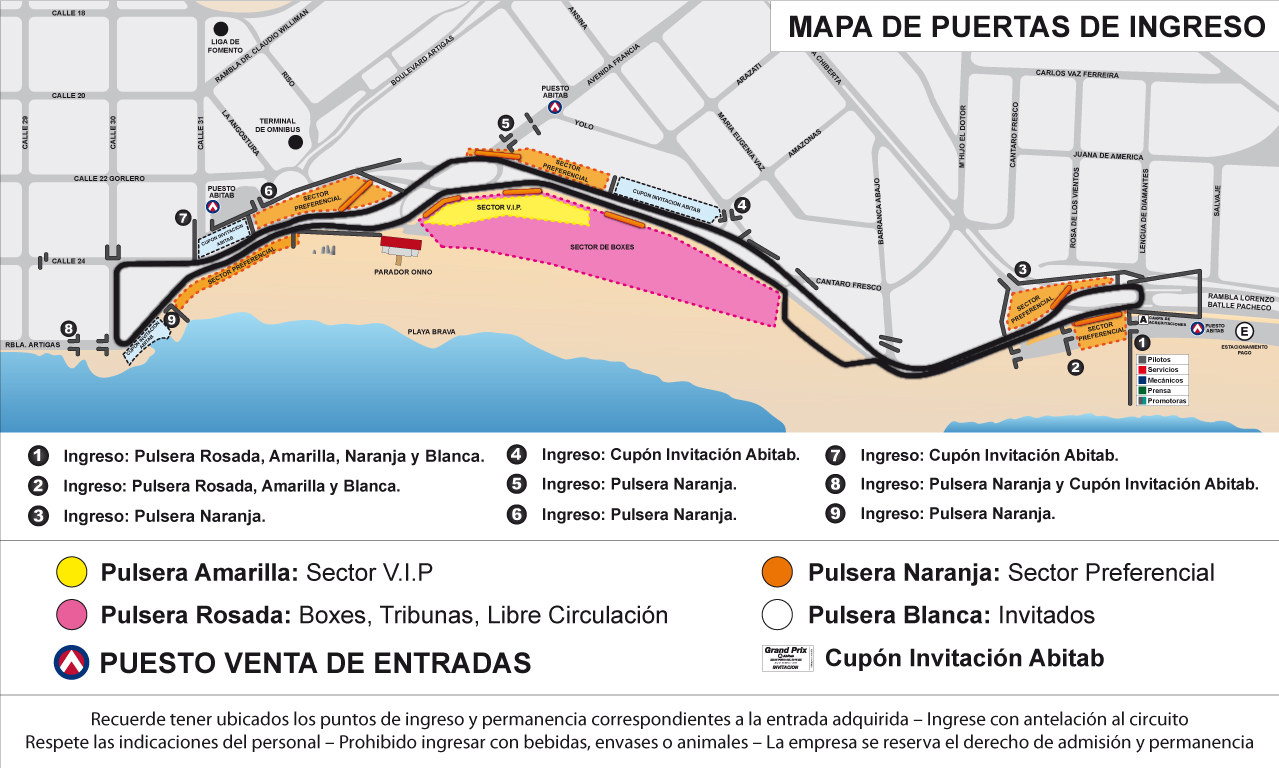
Comparison of 2010 circuit in city map

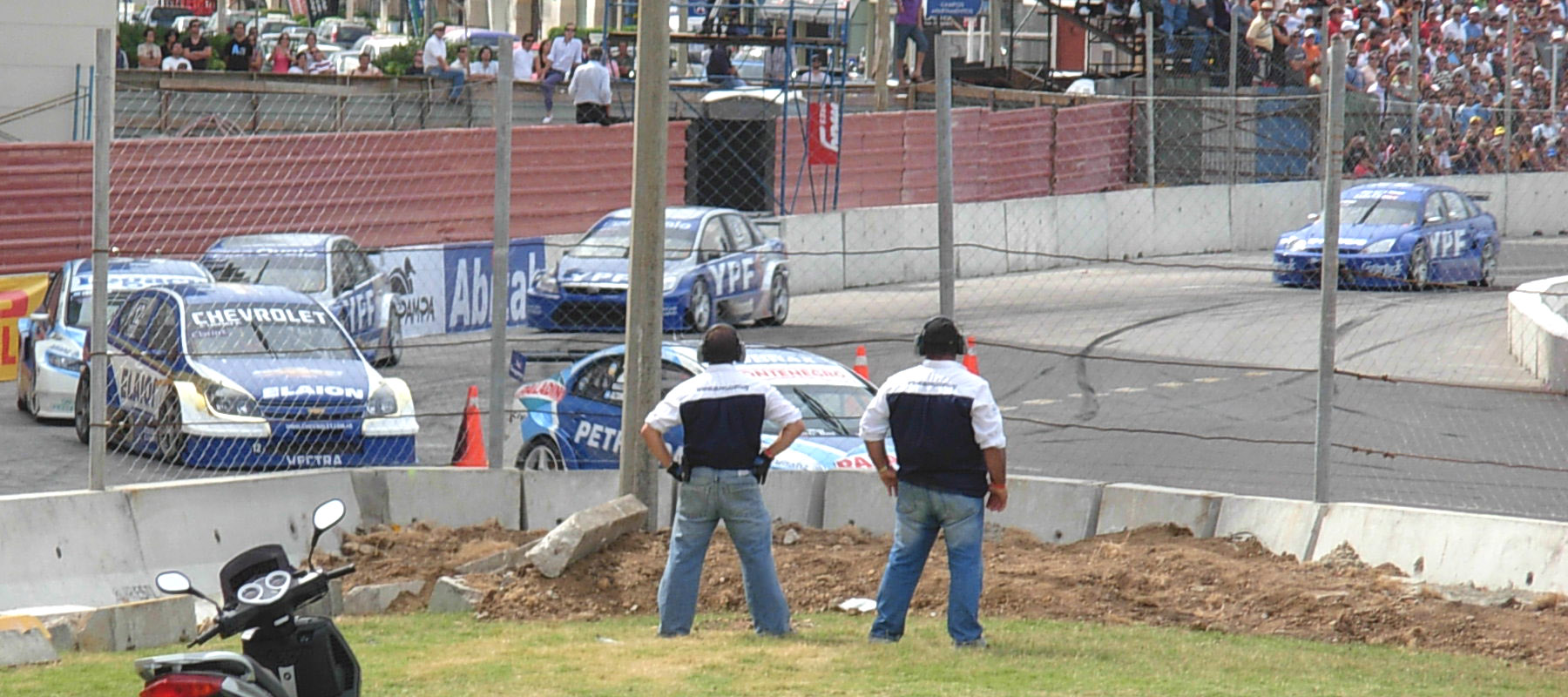
2010 - TC2000

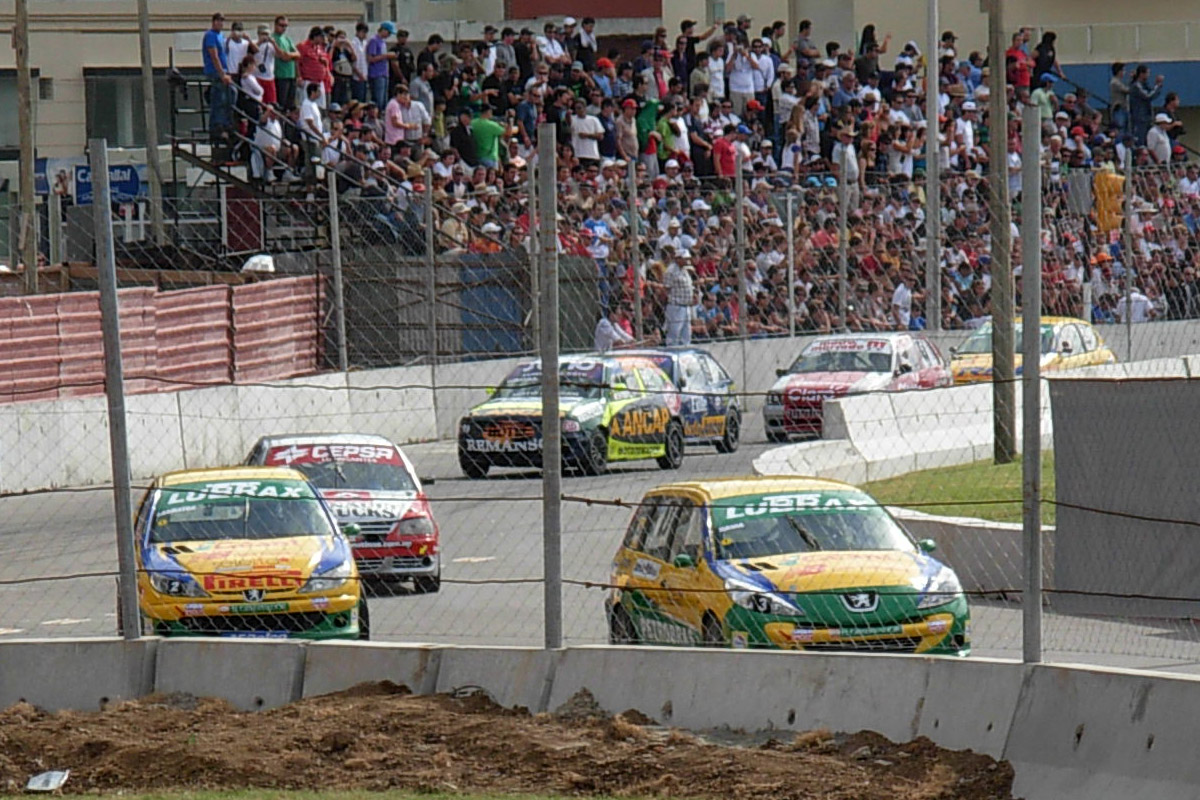
2010 - Superturismo

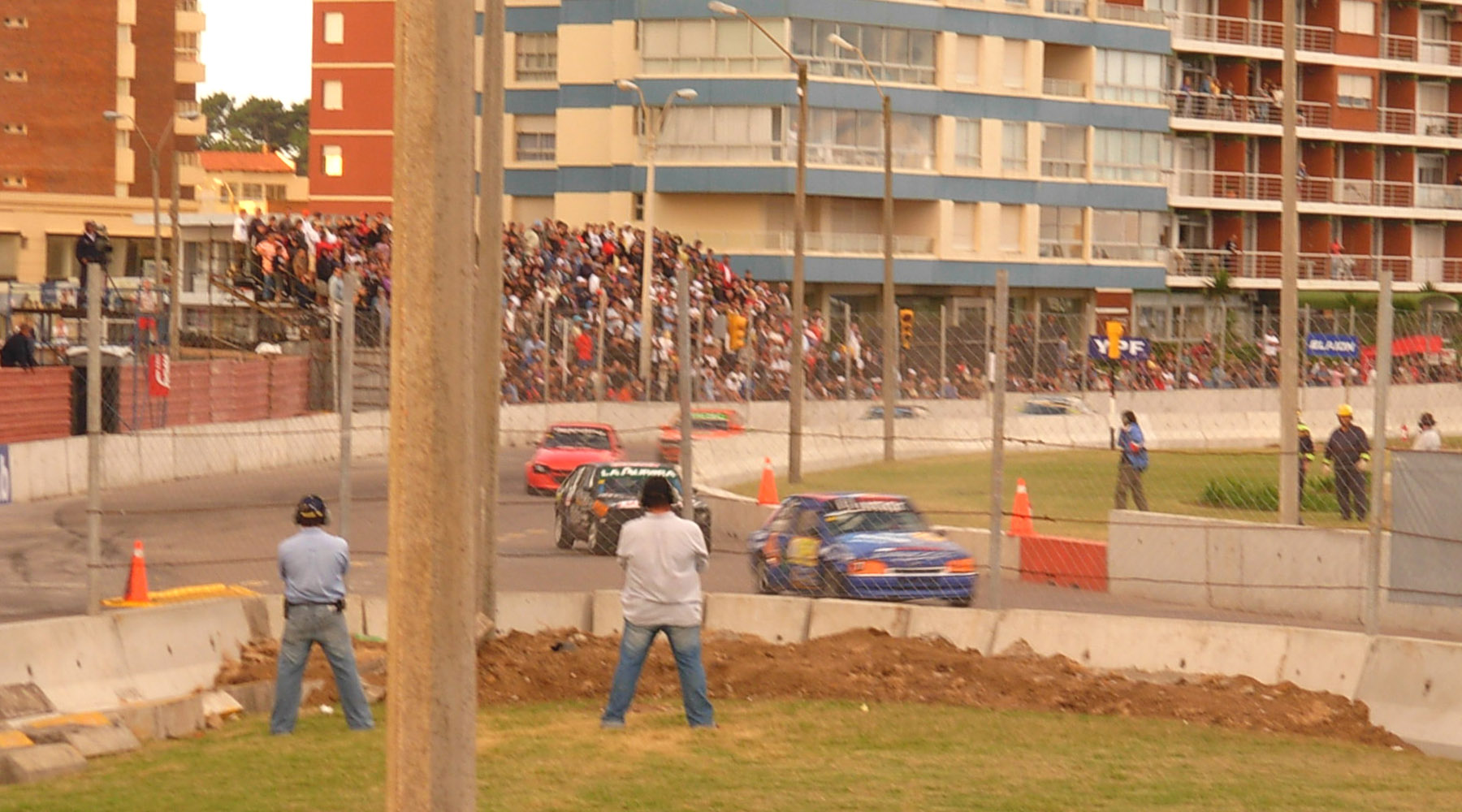
2010 - Turismo Libre

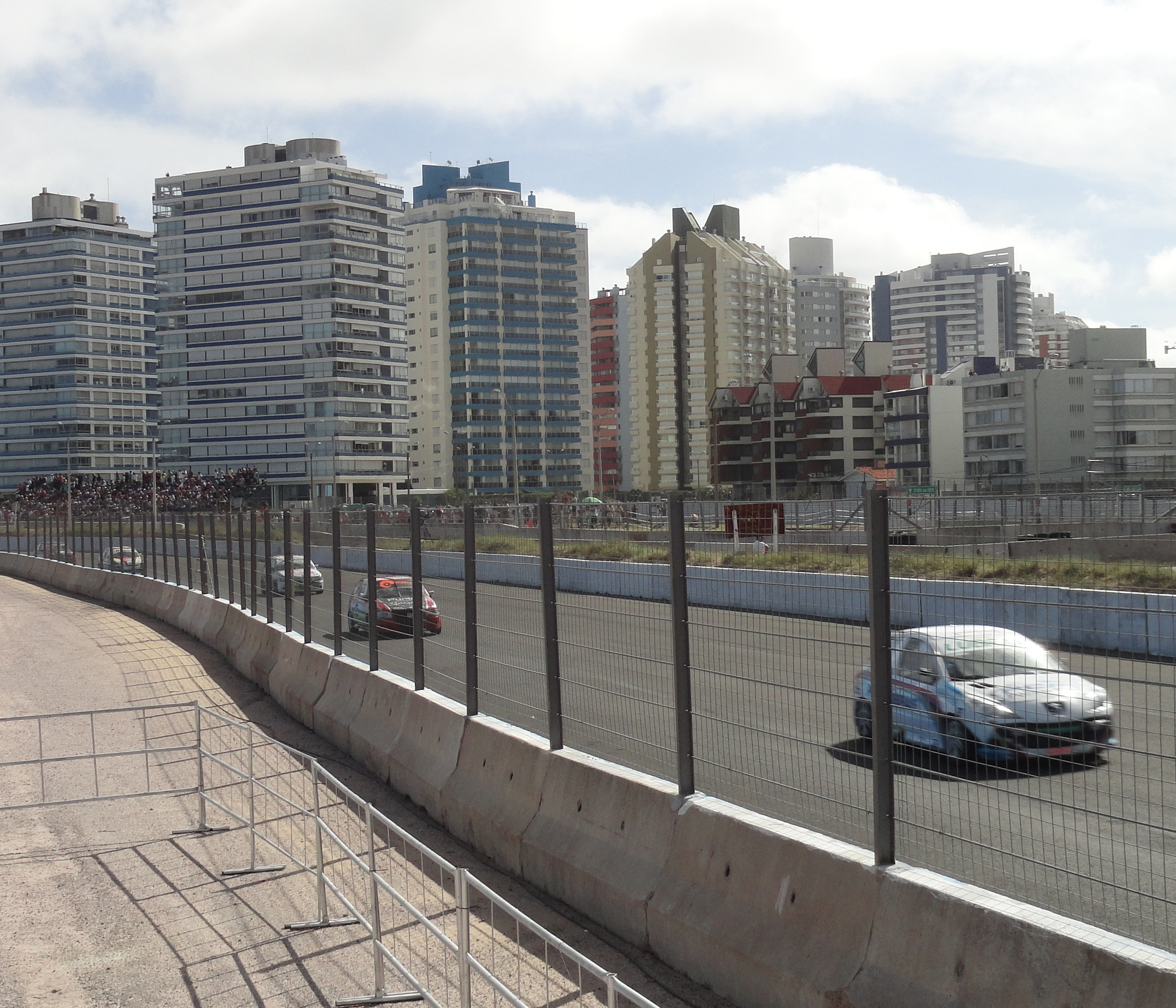
2014 - Superturismo

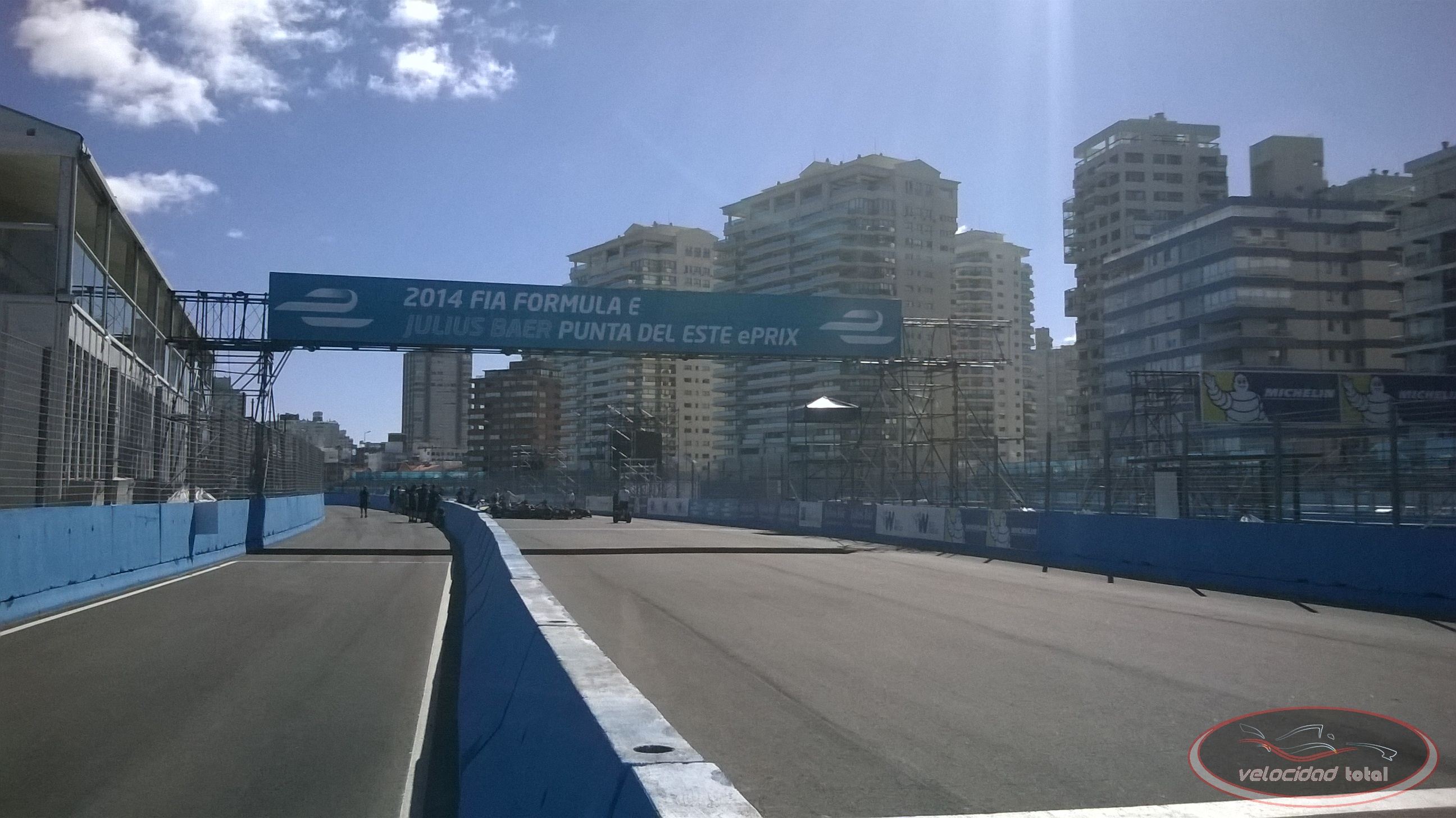
2014 - Formula E
