= Penske Autosport =

American auto racing team

(United States) Penske Autosport
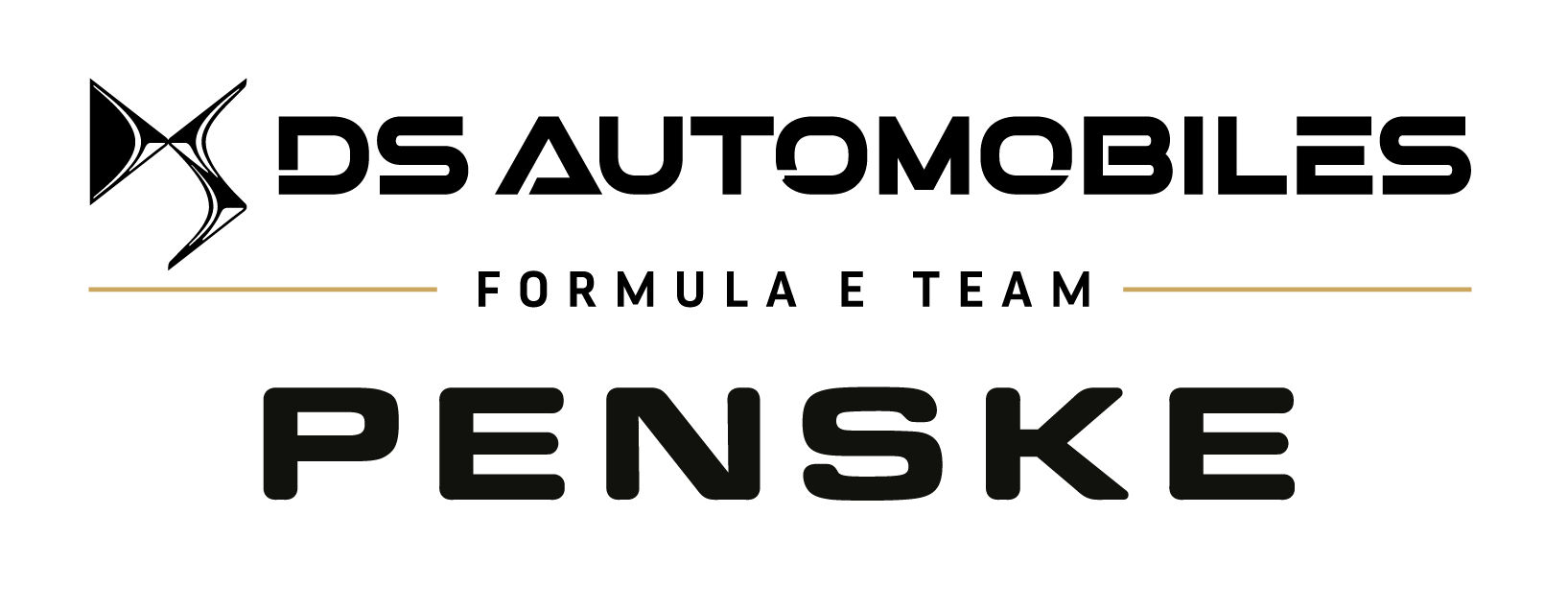
- Founded: 2007
- Founder(s): Jay Penske; Stephen J. Luczo
- Folded: 2026
- Former names: List: Luczo Dragon Racing (2007–2009); de Ferran Dragon Racing (2010); Dragon Racing (2011–2020); Dragon / Penske Autosport (2020–2022); DS Penske (2022–2026)
- Base: Los Angeles, California, United States; Silverstone, Northamptonshire, United Kingdom
- Team principal(s): Jay Penske
- Former series: Formula E IndyCar Series
- Noted drivers: (United Kingdom) Taylor Barnard (Australia) Ryan Briscoe (France) Sébastien Bourdais (Belgium) Jérôme d'Ambrosio (France) Loïc Duval (Italy) Antonio Giovinazzi (Germany) Maximilian Günther (United Kingdom) Katherine Legge (Switzerland) Nico Müller (Belgium) Stoffel Vandoorne (France) Jean-Éric Vergne
- First entry: 2007 Indianapolis 500
- Last entry: 2026 London ePrix
- First win: 2015 Berlin ePrix
- Last win: 2026 London ePrix
- Website: http://dspenske.com

Penske Autosport (formerly Dragon Racing and Dragon / Penske Autosport) was an American racing team. It competed in the IndyCar Series between 2007 and 2013, and Formula E between 2014 and 2026.

Penske Autosport was founded in 2007 as Dragon Racing by Americans Jay Penske and Stephen J. Luczo. It entered the Indianapolis 500 for the first time in 2007, and expanded to the full IndyCar Series schedule in 2009. In 2014, Dragon became one of the founding Formula E teams. It rebranded as Dragon / Penske in 2020, and later formed a partnership with DS Automobiles which saw the team compete as DS Penske between 2022 and 2026. In 2022–23, the team ran under a French license due to its DS partnership. In total, Penske took six Formula E wins over twelve seasons.

Penske Autosport's assets were sold to Jaguar partner Fortescue ahead of the 2026–27 season to form Fortescue Zero Racing.

== History ==
=== Luczo Dragon Racing ===
The team debuted as Luczo Dragon Racing in 2007. The team fielded a one-off entry at the 2007 Indianapolis 500 with a Penske loanee driver Ryan Briscoe. Jay Penske and Stephen J. Luczo were co-owners. Briscoe qualified 7th and finished 5th at Indianapolis 500. The car was notable for being painted in a "retro" paint schemes to resemble Rick Mears' 1988 Indianapolis 500 winning car, with Symantec software as the lead sponsor.

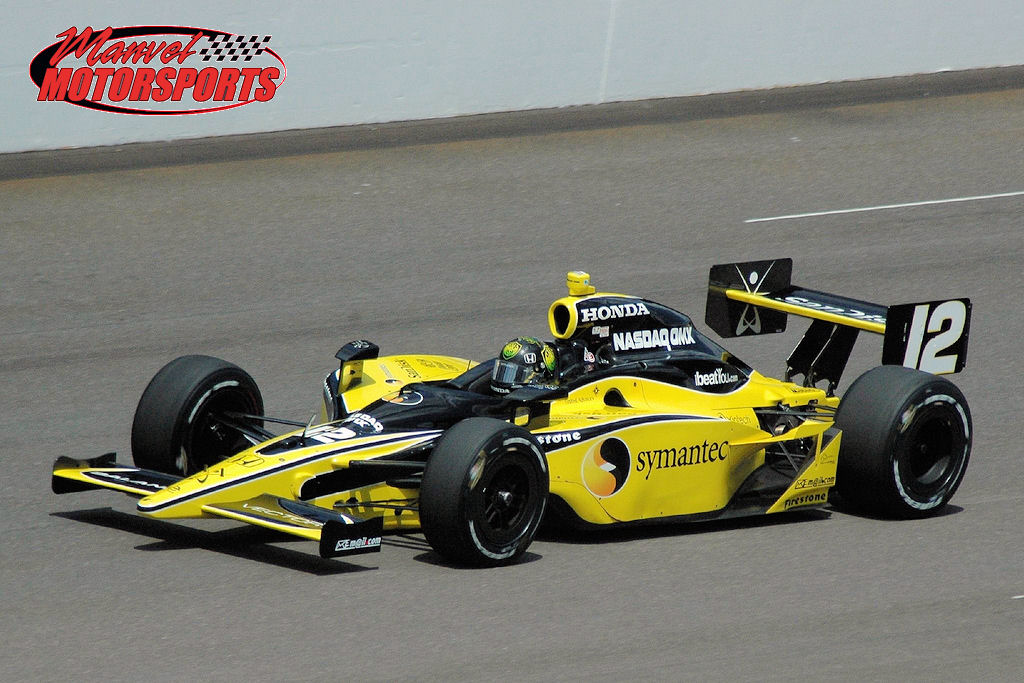
Scheckter's LDR car practicing for the 2008 Indy 500

Luczo Dragon ran a six-race schedule in 2008 including the Indianapolis 500 with IndyCar veteran Tomas Scheckter, this time without support or cars from Penske Racing. While qualifying well, qualifying 3rd and leading numerous laps at the Indy 500 before being knocked out by mechanical trouble.

The team expanded to a full-time entrant in 2009, fielding 2008 Indy Lights champion Raphael Matos. Matos and the Dragon Racing team went on to win the Rookie of Year honors in 2009 and scored multiple top-10 finishes.

=== Dragon Racing ===
In February 2011, Jay Penske re-branded the team as Dragon Racing in April 2011 and jointly announced that Paul Tracy had signed a five-race deal to compete for the team. Additionally the team entered two cars in the Indy 500 for drivers Scott Speed and Ho-Pin Tung. Tung crashed his car during qualifying and suffered a concussion crashing with only two corners to go, Tung would have qualified in the top 5. Scott Speed was unable to get his car up to speed, and the team let him go during practice.

In January 2012, Dragon Racing had operations in Indianapolis and Los Angeles. It entered two cars in the 2012 IndyCar Series season; one driven by Katherine Legge, and the other driven by four-time Champ Car champion Sébastien Bourdais, but on June 1, 2012, it was revealed that they would reduce operations to just 1 team with Bourdais driving the street courses and Legge on the ovals. Bourdais finished 25th in points with a best finish of fourth. Legge finished 26th with a best finish of 9th.

On February 12, 2013, it was announced that Sebastián Saavedra would be joining the team for the 2013 season in the No. 6 car while Bourdais would return in the No. 7. Bourdais and team continued to dominate at Road and Street courses capturing three podium finishes, including two in the double-header in Toronto. Saavedra finished 21st in points, last among full-time drivers, with two top-10 finishes. In 2014, the team left IndyCar racing to focus on the new Formula E electric powered series.

=== Formula E ===
On September 25, 2013, it was announced that Dragon Racing would be joining Formula E with Jay Penske leading the team. Dragon would be the second American team to join as Andretti Autosport had already announced their entry by then.

==== 2014–15 season ====
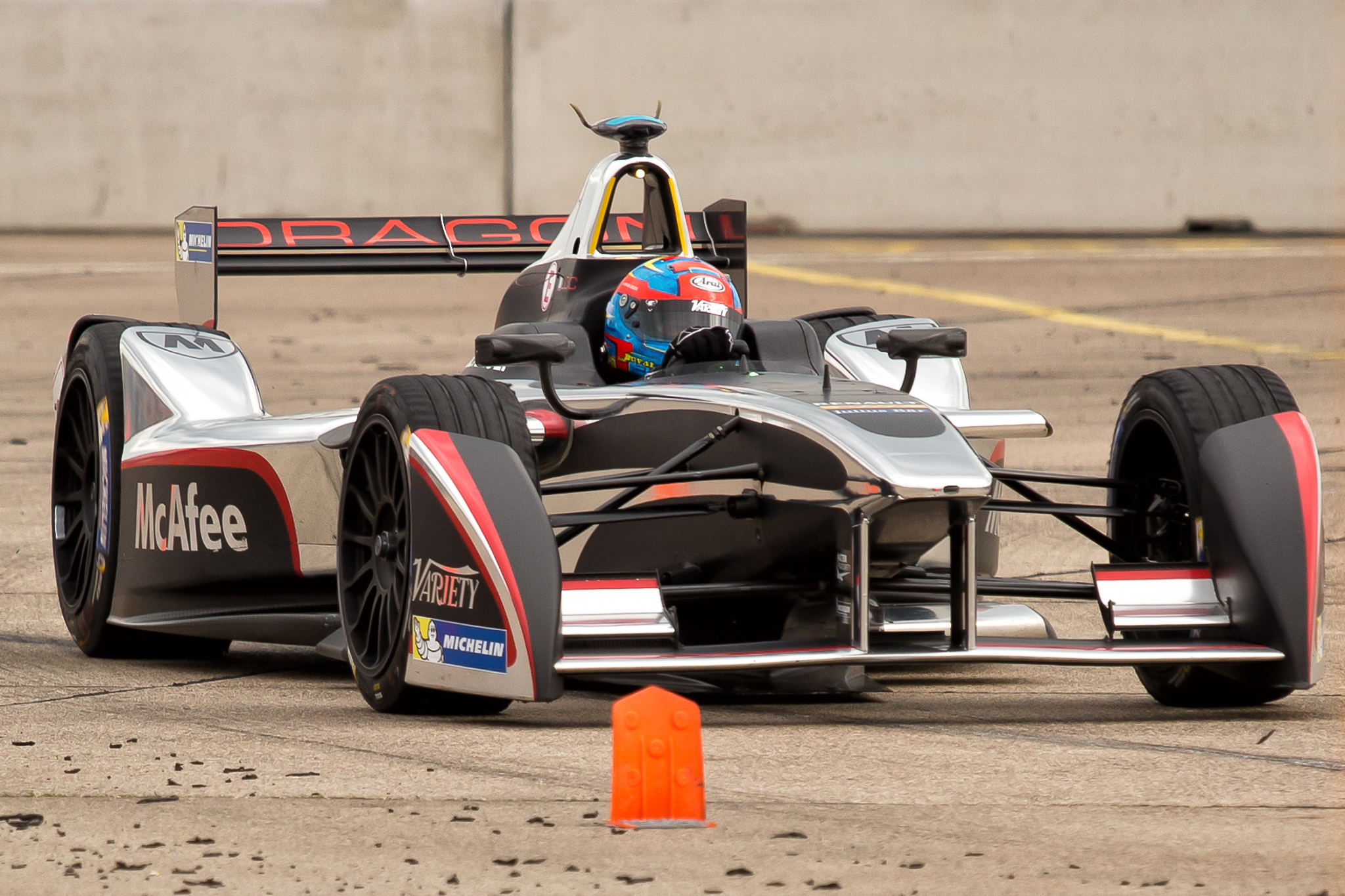
Loïc Duval driving the SRT01-e at the 2015 Berlin ePrix.

In July 2014, Dragon announced Mike Conway as their first driver. Later that month, Jérôme d'Ambrosio was announced as the second driver. Conway would actually not make his debut as his seat was taken over by Oriol Servià, who also got signed back in March 2014. Servià only competed in the first four races however, despite finishing on points in all of them. Loïc Duval then stepped in for the rest of the season, beginning from the 2015 Miami ePrix.

After a very successful second half of the season, Dragon finished second in Teams' Championship with 171 points.

==== 2015–16 season ====
Dragon decided not to build their own powertrain for the 2015–16 season and instead made a deal with Venturi to supply their VM200-FE-01 powertrains to the team. Dragon did not change their driver lineup from the previous year and continued to use d'Ambrosio and Duval.

After a slight dip in performance, Dragon finished fourth in Teams' Championship with 143 points.

==== 2016–17 season ====
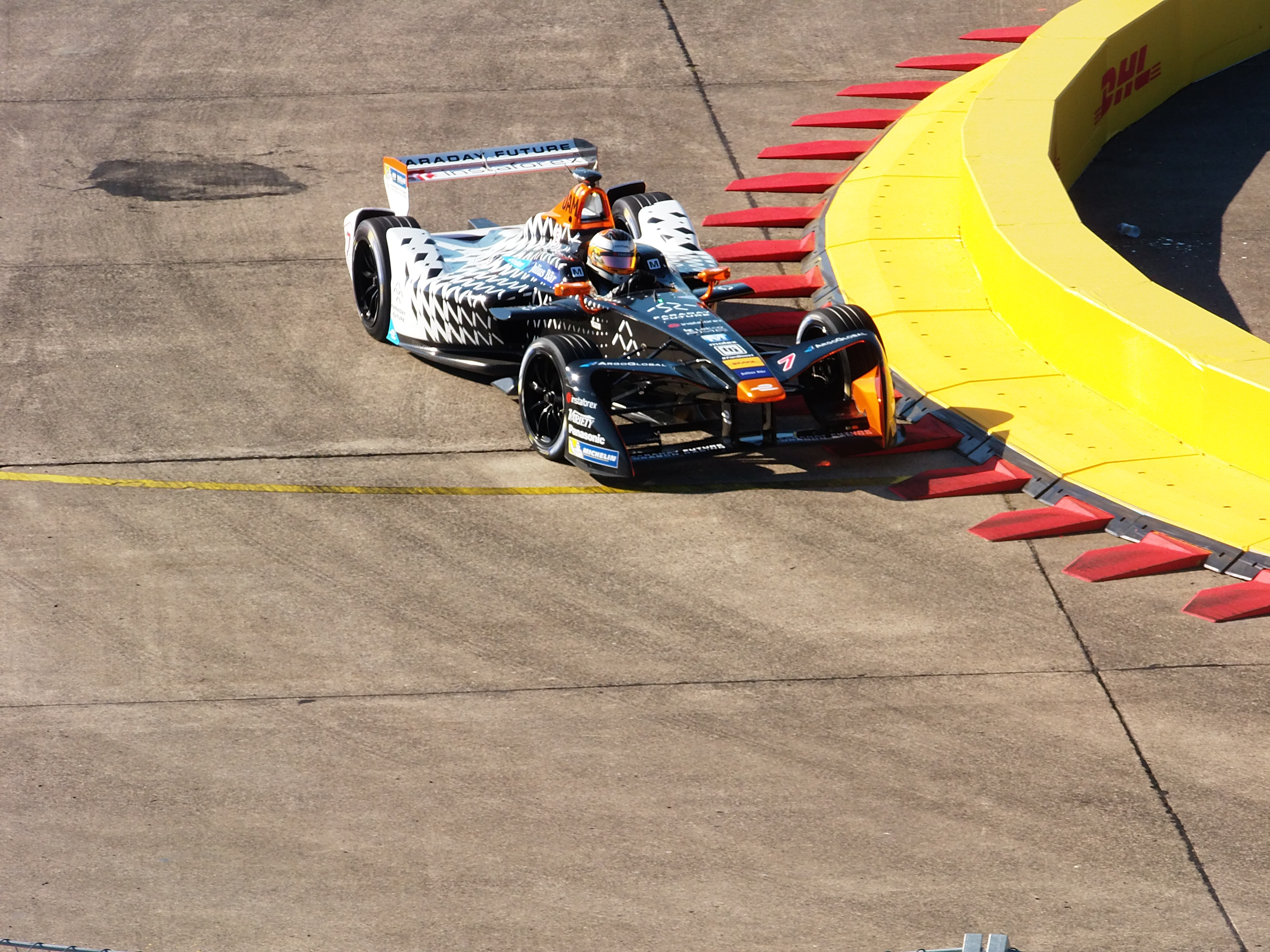
Jérôme d'Ambrosio with the Penske 701-EV at the 2017 Berlin ePrix.

Prior to the 2016–17 season, Dragon made a deal with Faraday Future, who became the title sponsor of the team and also a technical partner. The partnership would come to a close at the end of 2017. Dragon ended the Venturi partnership and became a manufacturer, developing their own powertrains. The pairing of d'Ambrosio and Duval was once again retained, though Mike Conway, the team's supposed first driver in the 2014–15 season, subbed for Duval at the 2016 Paris ePrix.

As a manufacturer, Dragon fell into eighth place in Teams' Championship, scoring only 33 points with no podium finishes.

==== 2017–18 season ====
Duval left the team and was replaced by Neel Jani. Jani would only make a single appearance at the 2017 Hong Kong ePrix double-header, with José María López replacing Jani for the rest of the season. The team ran two different liveries simultaneously. for each of their drivers. D'Ambrosio was given a red metallic car while Jani/López ran a white car.

Despite scoring 41 points, which was more than in the previous year, Dragon fell to ninth place in Teams' Championship.

==== 2018–19 season ====
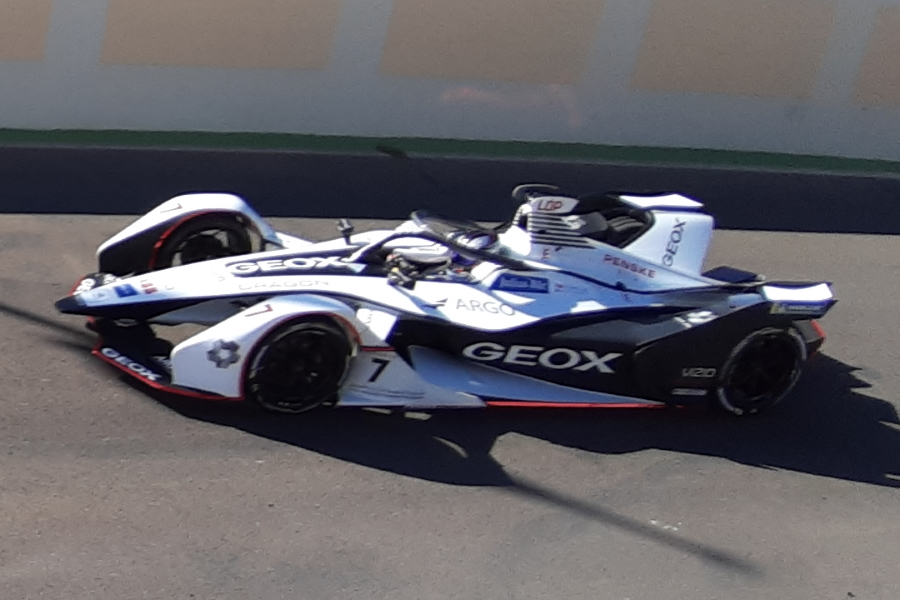
José María López with the Penske EV-3 at the 2019 Marrakesh ePrix.

For the 2018–19 season, the team got rebranded to GEOX Dragon, reflecting the new sponsorship deal with Geox. D'Ambrosio left the team to join Mahindra Racing, which prompted Dragon to promote their reserve driver Maximilian Günther to the empty seat. Prior to the 2019 Mexico City ePrix, Günther was replaced by Felipe Nasr. Günther got back into the seat at the Rome ePrix as Nasr had other commitments. Nasr would never return to Dragon again, however.

Dragon would once again worsen their position as they only scored 23 points, which was enough for tenth place in Teams' Championship.

==== 2019–20 season ====
In addition to being a manufacturer, Dragon also became the new suppliers of the Nio 333 FE Team. NIO bought the year-old Penske EV-3 powertrains and rebadged them. For the 2019–20 season, Dragon introduced a new driver lineup consisting of Brendon Hartley and Nico Müller. In March 2020, Dragon committed to their manufacturer status for another two seasons. Hartley left the team in July and was replaced by Sérgio Sette Câmara.

Dragon have fallen down to eleventh place in Teams' Championship, scoring just two points with Hartley's P9 finish in the second race of the 2019 Diriyah ePrix.

==== 2020–21 season ====
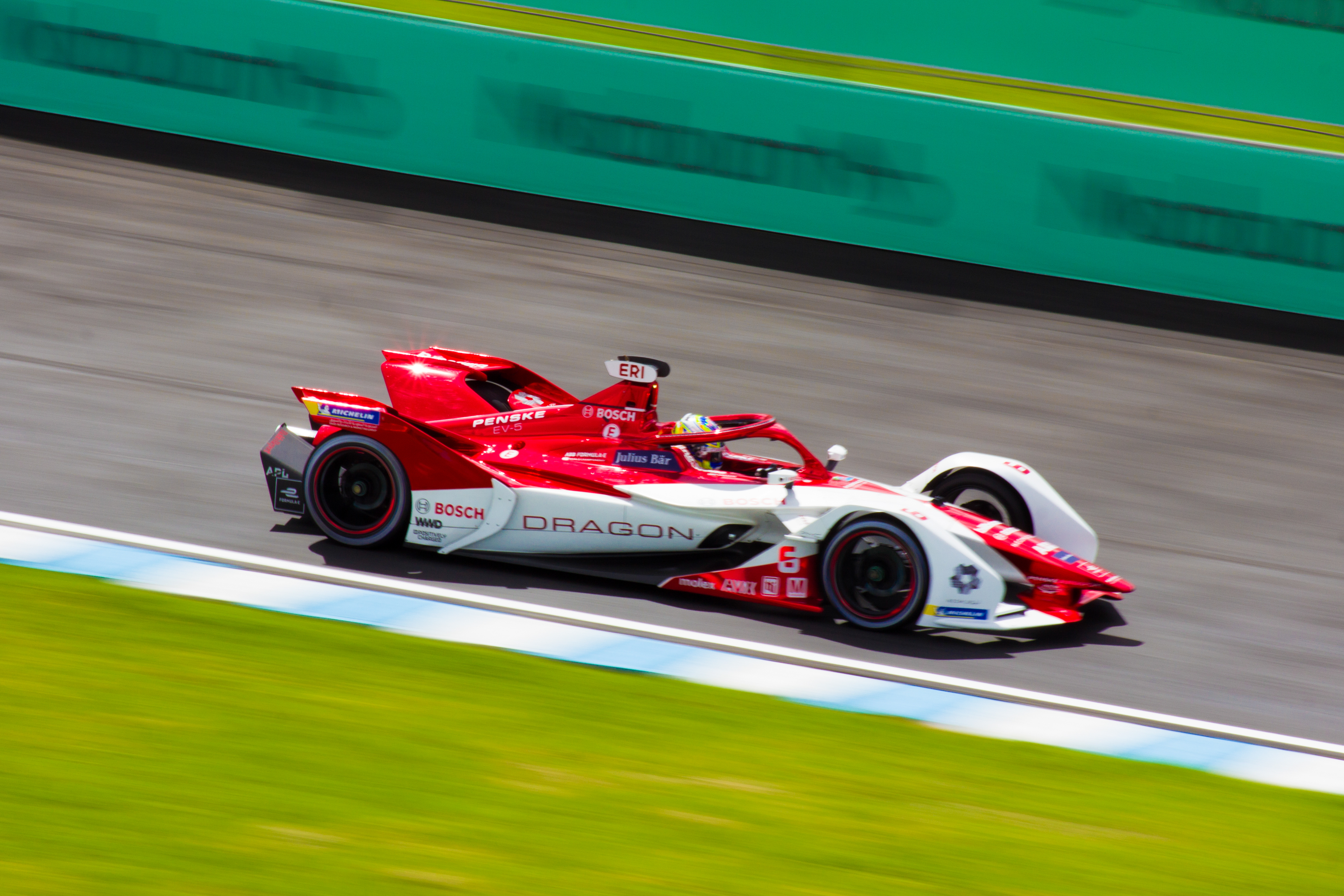
Joel Eriksson with the Penske EV-5 at the 2021 Puebla ePrix.

In November 2020, Sette Câmara was confirmed as a full-time driver for the upcoming 2020–21 season. The following month, Müller was confirmed as his partner. Rebranding as Dragon / Penske Autosport, the team would start the season with the Penske EV-4 powertrain from the previous season, only switching to Penske EV-5 at the 2021 Monaco ePrix. In February 2021, Dragon announced a technical partnership with Bosch, who will help develop Dragon's powertrains for the Gen3 era of Formula E.

In the chaotic first race of the Valencia ePrix, Müller scored Dragon's first Gen2 era podium with a second-place finish after many cars had to retire or were disqualified due to running out of energy. For the 2021 Puebla ePrix, Joel Eriksson replaced Müller due to a date clash with his DTM commitments. On July 3, 2021, Müller announced on his Twitter account that he and Dragon decided to part ways, effectively keeping Eriksson in his seat for the rest of the season.

==== 2021–22 season ====
The ex-Formula One driver Antonio Giovinazzi replaced Eriksson to partner Sette Câmara. The season was considered as the worst of the team, as the team finished last in the Team's Championship.

==== 2022–23 season ====
Partnering DS Automobiles after Techeetah folded, the team was rebranded as DS Penske. The driver lineup consists of two driver champions Jean-Éric Vergne and Stoffel Vandoorne. Vergne won the Hyderabad ePrix, the first victory for the team since 2016.

==== 2023–24 season ====
Both Vergne and Vandoorne were retained in season 10.

==== 2024–25 season ====
Vandoorne was released from the team and has his seat exchanged with Maximilian Günther. Günther managed to win two rounds in this season: race 1 of the Jeddah ePrix and race 1 of the Shanghai ePrix.

==== 2025–26 season ====
Vergne moved to DS sister team Citroën Racing and was replaced by former McLaren driver Taylor Barnard. In March 2026, DS announced that they will exit the series at the end of the season. Barnard secured the team's only victory of the season in race two of the London ePrix finale, thereby becoming the youngest Formula E race winner at 22.

==== Sponsors ====
Sponsor (Note: This list only includes companies whose logos have appeared on the team's cars. Mandatory logos of series' partners are also excluded from the list.)	2014–15	2015–16	2016–17	2017–18	2018–19	2019–20	2020–21	2021–22	2022–23	2023–24	2024–25	2025–26
Faraday Future	No	Yes	Yes T	No	No	No	No	No	No	No	No	No
Geox	No	No	No	No	Yes T	Yes T	No	No	No	No	No	No
DS Automobiles	No	No	No	No	No	No	No	No	Yes T	Yes T	Yes T	Yes T
Penske Media Corporation (Note: Including various subsidiaries in Variety (all seasons), India.com (2014–2015, 2015–2016), Boy Genius Report (2015–2016, 2017–2018, 2019–2020), Robb Report (2016–2020), Rolling Stone (2018–present), Women's Wear Daily (2020–present), Billboard (2020–present) and South by Southwest (2022–present).)	Yes	Yes	Yes	Yes	Yes	Yes	Yes	Yes	Yes	Yes	Yes	Yes
McAfee	Yes	Yes	No	No	No	No	No	No	No	No	No	No
InstaForex	Yes	Yes	Yes	Yes	Yes	No	Yes	No	No	No	No	No
MixBit	No	Yes	No	No	No	No	No	No	No	No	No	No
Molex	No	Yes	Yes	Yes	Yes	Yes	Yes	Yes	Yes	Yes	Yes	Yes
Fenix	No	Yes	No	No	No	No	No	No	No	No	No	No
Mouser Electronics (Note: Including a parent company in TTI, Inc.)	No	Yes	Yes	Yes	Yes	Yes	Yes	Yes	Yes	Yes	Yes	Yes
Panasonic	No	Yes	Yes	No	No	No	No	No	No	No	No	No
LeEco	No	No	Yes	No	No	No	No	No	No	No	No	No
Argo Group	No	No	Yes	Yes	Yes	Yes	No	No	No	No	No	No
Saudi Research and Marketing Group	No	No	No	Yes	Yes	No	Yes	Yes	Yes	Yes	Yes	Yes
Neom	No	No	No	Yes	Yes	Yes	Yes	Yes	No	No	No	No
AVX Corporation (Note: Including a parent company in Kyocera (2021–present).)	No	No	No	No	Yes	Yes	Yes	Yes	Yes	Yes	Yes	Yes
Vizio	No	No	No	No	Yes	Yes	No	No	No	No	No	No
IQONIQ	No	No	No	No	No	No	Yes	No	No	No	No	No
Bosch	No	No	No	No	No	No	Yes	Yes	No	No	No	No
Athletic Propulsion Labs	No	No	No	No	No	No	Yes	Yes	No	No	No	No
TotalEnergies	No	No	No	No	No	No	No	No	Yes	Yes	Yes	Yes
Yahoo!	No	No	No	No	No	No	No	No	No	Yes	Yes	Yes
Syensqo	No	No	No	No	No	No	No	No	No	Yes	Yes	Yes
Lockton	No	No	No	No	No	No	No	No	No	No	Yes	Yes

Past logos
2020–2022

2018–2020

== Drivers ==
=== Indycar ===
- (Australia) Ryan Briscoe (2007)
- (South Africa) Tomas Scheckter (2008)
- (Brazil) Raphael Matos (2009–2010)
- (Canada) Patrick Carpentier^{1} (2011)
- (United States) Scott Speed^{1} (2011)
- (Canada) Paul Tracy (2011)
- (China) Ho-Pin Tung (2011)
- (United Kingdom) Katherine Legge (2012)
- (France) Sébastien Bourdais (2012–2013)
- (Colombia) Sebastián Saavedra (2013)

=== Formula E ===
- (Spain) Oriol Servià (2014-2015)
- (Belgium) Jérôme d'Ambrosio (2014–2018)
- (France) Loïc Duval (2015–2017)
- (United Kingdom) Mike Conway (2017)
- (Switzerland) Neel Jani (2017)
- (Germany) Maximilian Günther (2018–2019)
- (Argentina) José María López (2018–2019)
- (Brazil) Felipe Nasr (2019)
- (New Zealand) Brendon Hartley (2019)
- (Switzerland) Nico Müller (2019–2021)
- (Brazil) Sérgio Sette Câmara (2020–2022)
- (Sweden) Joel Eriksson (2021)
- (Italy) Antonio Giovinazzi (2022)
- (Belgium) Stoffel Vandoorne (2023–2024)
- (France) Jean-Éric Vergne (2023–2025)
- (Germany) Maximilian Günther (2024–2026)
- (United Kingdom) Taylor Barnard (2025–2026)

== Racing results ==
=== Complete Formula E results ===
(key) (results in bold indicate pole position; results in italics indicate fastest lap)

Year	Chassis	Powertrain	Tyres	No.	Drivers	1	2	3	4	5	6	7	8	9	10	11	12	13	14	15	16	17	Points	T.C.
Dragon Racing
2014–15	Spark SRT01-e	SRT01-e^{1}	M			BEI	PUT	PDE	BUE	MIA	LBH	MCO	BER	MSC	LDN								**171**	**2nd**
2014–15	Spark SRT01-e	SRT01-e^{1}	M	6	(Spain) Oriol Servià	7	7	9	9														**171**	**2nd**
2014–15	Spark SRT01-e	SRT01-e^{1}	M	6	(France) Loïc Duval					7	9	Ret	3	15	8	3							**171**	**2nd**
2014–15	Spark SRT01-e	SRT01-e^{1}	M	7	(Belgium) Jérôme d'Ambrosio	6	5	8	14	4	6	5	1	11	2	2							**171**	**2nd**
2015–16	Spark SRT01-e	Venturi VM200-FE-01	M			BEI	PUT	PDE	BUE	MEX	LBH	PAR	BER	LDN									143	4th
2015–16	Spark SRT01-e	Venturi VM200-FE-01	M	6	(France) Loïc Duval	4	16†	4	6	4	8	Ret	Ret	Ret	4								143	4th
2015–16	Spark SRT01-e	Venturi VM200-FE-01	M	7	(Belgium) Jérôme d'Ambrosio	5	14†	**3**	16	**1**	7	11	16	9	3								143	4th
Faraday Future Dragon Racing
2016–17	Spark SRT01-e	Penske 701-EV	M			HKG	MRK	BUE	MEX	MCO	PAR	BER		NYC		MTL							33	8th
2016–17	Spark SRT01-e	Penske 701-EV	M	6	(France) Loïc Duval	14	18	6	Ret	Ret		15	Ret	5	13	Ret	19						33	8th
2016–17	Spark SRT01-e	Penske 701-EV	M	6	(United Kingdom) Mike Conway						14												33	8th
2016–17	Spark SRT01-e	Penske 701-EV	M	7	(Belgium) Jérôme d'Ambrosio	7	13	8	14	Ret	NC	13	13	Ret	10	11	9						33	8th
Dragon Racing
2017–18	Spark SRT01-e	Penske EV-2	M			HKG		MRK	SCL	MEX	PDE	RME	PAR	BER	ZUR	NYC							41	9th
2017–18	Spark SRT01-e	Penske EV-2	M	6	(Switzerland) Neel Jani	18	18																41	9th
2017–18	Spark SRT01-e	Penske EV-2	M	6	(Argentina) José María López			6	Ret	12	8	17†	10	18	12	Ret	Ret						41	9th
2017–18	Spark SRT01-e	Penske EV-2	M	7	(Belgium) Jérôme d'Ambrosio	Ret	15	15	8	11	9	7	12	19	3	13	Ret						41	9th
GEOX Dragon
2018–19	Spark SRT05e	Penske EV-3	M			ADR	MRK	SCL	MEX	HKG	SYX	RME	PAR	MCO	BER	BRN	NYC						23	10th
2018–19	Spark SRT05e	Penske EV-3	M	6	(Germany) Maximilian Günther	16	12	Ret				19†	5	Ret	14	5	Ret	19†					23	10th
2018–19	Spark SRT05e	Penske EV-3	M	6	(Brazil) Felipe Nasr				19	Ret	Ret												23	10th
2018–19	Spark SRT05e	Penske EV-3	M	7	(Argentina) José María López	Ret	11	9	17	11	Ret	16	13	10	20	DSQ	12	Ret					23	10th
2019–20	Spark SRT05e	Penske EV-4	M			DIR		SCL	MEX	MRK	BER		BER		BER								2	11th
2019–20	Spark SRT05e	Penske EV-4	M	6	(New Zealand) Brendon Hartley	19	9	Ret	12	19													2	11th
2019–20	Spark SRT05e	Penske EV-4	M	6	(Brazil) Sérgio Sette Câmara						DSQ	17	Ret	21	15	19							2	11th
2019–20	Spark SRT05e	Penske EV-4	M	7	(Switzerland) Nico Müller	DNS	Ret	12	Ret	20	Ret	14	12	20	17	22							2	11th
Dragon / Penske Autosport
2020–21	Spark SRT05e	Penske EV-4; Penske EV-5	M			DIR		RME		VLC		MCO	PUE		NYC		LDN		BER				47	11th
2020–21	Spark SRT05e	Penske EV-4; Penske EV-5	M	6	(Switzerland) Nico Müller	21	5	13	9	2	20	18											47	11th
2020–21	Spark SRT05e	Penske EV-4; Penske EV-5	M	6	(Sweden) Joel Eriksson								17	15	17	22	16	10	16	16			47	11th
2020–21	Spark SRT05e	Penske EV-4; Penske EV-5	M	7	(Brazil) Sérgio Sette Câmara	20	4	16	12	Ret	21	15	15	16	18	11	17	8	18	18			47	11th
2021–22	Spark SRT05e	Penske EV-5	M			DIR		MEX	RME		MCO	BER		JAK	MRK	NYC		LDN		SEO			2	11th
2021–22	Spark SRT05e	Penske EV-5	M	7	(Brazil) Sérgio Sette Câmara	15	17	20	15	12	13	17	19	19	20	DNS	17	NC	9	12	13		2	11th
2021–22	Spark SRT05e	Penske EV-5	M	99	(Italy) Antonio Giovinazzi	20	20	Ret	19	Ret	16	20	22	Ret	19	Ret	Ret	Ret	Ret	Ret	WD		2	11th
2021–22	Spark SRT05e	Penske EV-5	M	99	(France) Sacha Fenestraz																16		2	11th
DS Penske
2022–23	Formula E Gen3	DS E-Tense FE23	H			MEX	DIR		HYD	CPT	SPL	BER		MCO	JAK		PRT	RME		LDN			163	5th
2022–23	Formula E Gen3	DS E-Tense FE23	H	1	(Belgium) Stoffel Vandoorne	10	11	20	8	7	**6**	Ret	8	9	4	9	12	11	8	11	5		163	5th
2022–23	Formula E Gen3	DS E-Tense FE23	H	25	(France) Jean-Éric Vergne	12	7	16	1	2	5	7	3	7	5	16	11	5	15	Ret	22		163	5th
2023–24	Formula E Gen3	DS E-Tense FE23	H			MEX	DIR		SAP	TOK	MIS		MCO	BER		SHA		POR		LDN			200	3rd
2023–24	Formula E Gen3	DS E-Tense FE23	H	2	(Belgium) Stoffel Vandoorne	8	14	5	8	16	8	Ret	3	7	20	9	6	9	11	9	8		200	3rd
2023–24	Formula E Gen3	DS E-Tense FE23	H	25	(France) Jean-Éric Vergne	6	**2**	8	7	12	6	7	4	2	10	**6**	7	3	**5**	17	5		200	3rd
2024–25	Formula E Gen3 Evo	DS E-Tense FE25	H			SAP	MEX	JED		MIA	MCO		TOK		SHA		JAK	BER		LDN			184	5th
2024–25	Formula E Gen3 Evo	DS E-Tense FE25	H	7	(Germany) Maximilian Günther	11	6	**1**	Ret	17	10	8	Ret	10	**1**	Ret	Ret	6	Ret	Ret	7		184	5th
2024–25	Formula E Gen3 Evo	DS E-Tense FE25	H	25	(France) Jean-Éric Vergne	9	5	6	7	12	12	6	8	6	2	5	16	Ret	3	5	15		184	5th
2025–26	Formula E Gen3 Evo	DS E-Tense FE25	H			SAP	MEX	MIA	JED		MAD	BER		MCO		SYX	SHA		TOK		LDN		91	9th
2025–26	Formula E Gen3 Evo	DS E-Tense FE25	H	7	(Germany) Maximilian Günther	6	12	19	11	11	13	11	15	10	13	6	9	10	15	9	12	11	91	9th
2025–26	Formula E Gen3 Evo	DS E-Tense FE25	H	77	(United Kingdom) Taylor Barnard	13	4	14	10	10	19	8	11	7	15	9	16	9	10	8	5	1	91	9th

Notes

- **^1** – In the inaugural season, all teams were supplied with a spec powertrain by McLaren.
- † – Driver did not finish the race, but was classified as he completed over 90% of the race distance.
- * – Season still in progress.

==== Other teams supplied by Dragon ====
Year	Team	Chassis	Powertrain	Tyres	No.	Drivers	Points	T.C.	Source
2019–20	(China) Nio 333 FE Team	Spark SRT05e	Nio FE-005^{1}	**M**	No.	Drivers	0	12th	
2019–20	(China) Nio 333 FE Team	Spark SRT05e	Nio FE-005^{1}	**M**	3	(United Kingdom) Oliver Turvey	0	12th	
2019–20	(China) Nio 333 FE Team	Spark SRT05e	Nio FE-005^{1}	**M**	33	(China) Ma Qinghua	0	12th	
2019–20	(China) Nio 333 FE Team	Spark SRT05e	Nio FE-005^{1}	**M**	33	(Germany) Daniel Abt	0	12th	

Notes

- **^1** – The powertrain is a rebadged Penske EV-3.

=== Complete IndyCar Series results ===
(key)

Year	Chassis	Engine	Drivers	No.	1	2	3	4	5	6	7	8	9	10	11	12	13	14	15	16	17	18	19
Luczo Dragon Racing
2007					HMS	STP	MOT	KAN	INDY	MIL	TXS	IOW	RIR	WGL	NSH	MDO	MCH	KTY	SNM	DET	CHI		
2007	Dallara IR-05	Honda HI7R V8	(Australia) Ryan Briscoe	12					5^{1}														
2008					HMS	STP	MOT	LBH	KAN	INDY	MIL	TXS	IOW	RIR	WGL	NSH	MDO	EDM	KTY	SNM	DET	CHI	SRF^{2}
2008	Dallara IR-05	Honda HI8R V8	(South Africa) Tomas Scheckter	12					23	24		25								27	21	26	
2009					STP	LBH	KAN	INDY	MIL	TXS	IOW	RIR	WGL	TOR	EDM	KTY	MDO	SNM	CHI	MOT	HMS		
2009	Dallara IR-05	Honda HI9R V8	(Brazil) Raphael Matos	2	20	8	20	22	6	12	16	8	12	10	18	16	9	9	9	9	14		
de Ferran Dragon Racing
2010					SAO	STP	ALA	LBH	KAN	INDY	TXS	IOW	WGL	TOR	EDM	MDO	SNM	CHI	KTY	MOT	HMS		
2010	Dallara IR-05	Honda HI10R V8	(Brazil) Raphael Matos	2	4	8	14	20	16	29	16	14	4	21	13	7	21	29	16	18	17		
2010	Dallara IR-05	Honda HI10R V8	(United States) Davey Hamilton	21						33								18					
Dragon Racing
2011					STP	ALA	LBH	SAO	INDY	TXS		MIL	IOW	TOR	EDM	MDO	NHM	SNM	BAL	MOT	KTY	LSV	
2011	Dallara IR-05	Honda HI11R V8	(Canada) Paul Tracy	8			16			12	13			16	26							C^{3}	
2011	Dallara IR-05	Honda HI11R V8	(China) Ho-Pin Tung	8					Wth														
2011	Dallara IR-05	Honda HI11R V8	(China) Ho-Pin Tung	88														27					
2011	Dallara IR-05	Honda HI11R V8	(United States) Scott Speed	20					DNQ														
2011	Dallara IR-05	Honda HI11R V8	(Canada) Patrick Carpentier	20					DNQ														
2012					STP	ALA	LBH	SAO	INDY	DET	TEX	MIL	IOW	TOR	EDM	MDO	SNM	BAL	FON				
2012	Dallara DW12	Lotus DC00 V6 t	(United Kingdom) Katherine Legge	6	23	23	19	26															
2012	Dallara DW12	Chevrolet IndyCar V6 t	(United Kingdom) Katherine Legge	6					22		15	18	15				24		9				
2012	Dallara DW12	Lotus DC00 V6 t	(France) Sébastien Bourdais	7	21	9	17	18															
2012	Dallara DW12	Chevrolet IndyCar V6 t	(France) Sébastien Bourdais	7					20	24				14	15	4	22	23					
2013					STP	ALA	LBH	SAO	INDY	DET		TXS	MIL	IOW	POC	TOR		MDO	SNM	BAL	HOU		FON
2013	Dallara DW12	Chevrolet IndyCar V6 t	(Colombia) Sebastián Saavedra	6	20	20	27	19	32	22	10	14	13	19	23	16	15	19	21	8	14	12	24
2013	Dallara DW12	Chevrolet IndyCar V6 t	(France) Sébastien Bourdais	7	11	16	15	14	29	24	11	20	22	14	16	2	3	12	10	3	8	5	12

1. With support from Team Penske.
2. Non-points-paying, exhibition race.
3. The 2011 Las Vegas race was abandoned following a Lap 11 fatal crash that damaged the circuit. Under INDYCAR rules, 101 of 200 laps had to be completed for a legal race.
