= Lazier Partners Racing =

(United States) Lazier Partners Racing
- Founded: 2013
- Folded: 2018
- Team principal(s): Bob Lazier; Corbet Krause; Chris Nielsen; Jason Peters
- Current series: IndyCar Series
- Current drivers: (United States) 44. Buddy Lazier (Indy 500)

Lazier Partners Racing was an American racing team in the IndyCar Series. The team was owned by former driver Bob Lazier, father of Buddy Lazier and Jaques Lazier, along with Corbet Krause, Chris Nielsen, Jason Peters, and others.

== History ==
Initial plans to race began in February 2012 during a ski trip in Vail, Colorado, but the team could not find a car for the 2012 Indianapolis 500. Lazier Burns Racing (then called Lazier Partners Racing) was formed as a late entry for the 2013 Indianapolis 500. The Dallara DW12 car was a Lotus test chassis bought from Fan Force United for $250,000, who raced in the 2012 Indianapolis 500 with Jean Alesi. Alesi started and finished last after being black-flagged for running too slowly. The chassis required updates at the Dallara factory in Indianapolis and engines were leased from Chevrolet. Dennis Lacava was hired as the crew chief along with former crew members from Hemelgarn Racing. To make the race, the team spent an estimated half million dollars. Advance Auto Parts and Peak Motor Oil sponsored the team. To honor victims of the 2013 Moore tornado, the car was renamed "Spirit of Oklahoma." The team ran the least practices laps, qualified 32nd, and finished 31st after running only 44 laps due to a mechanical issue.

Planning for 2014 was delayed due to the Lazier family's concentration on its Tivoli Lodge business. The team returned for the 2014 Indianapolis 500 supporting the University of Iowa Stephen A. Wynn Institute for Vision Research. Support for the institute was given as Buddy Lazier's daughter Jacqueline suffers from Aniridia. Team support is being provided by Phillips Energy Partners and Herman Miller, with associate sponsorship from Briggs & Stratton. Buddy Lazier will drive in the next five Indianapolis 500's due to a new sponsorship agreement. David Cripps, ex-Panther Racing engineer, was hired as the lead engineer. The team had trouble finding engineers and mechanics due to a shortage in IndyCar. U.S. Olympians Abe Morlu and Dallas Robinson were members of the pit crew, serving as the right-rear tire changer and refueler. The team ran roughly 77 practices laps, qualified 33rd, and finished 32nd after running 87 laps due to a mechanical (clutch) issue.

Due to their engine contract and low budget, the team could not practice for the 2015 Indianapolis 500 until Thursday and missed practice time due to rain. Before qualification the car suffered a broken axle and upright. The team was slow during qualification two even after making radical rear wing changes and did not qualify for the Indianapolis 500.

In 2016, the team returned in partnership with Indiana contractor Tom Burns, and the team was rebranded as Lazier Burns Racing. The team also changed their car number to 4 instead of their usual 91, but Buddy Lazier remained as driver. With only 33 entries for the race, the Lazier team was guaranteed a spot in the field. Lazier qualified in 32nd for the race, the slowest car that completed their qualifying run. In the race, the team suffered problems during the parade lap stemming from a stuck throttle. While the car would return to the track after spending about 30 laps in the pits, the car was eventually retired after completing 100 laps when a tire came off the car after a pit stop; the team finished 30th.

== Racing results ==
=== Complete IndyCar Series results ===
(key)

Year	Chassis	Engine	Drivers	No.	1	2	3	4	5	6	7	8	9	10	11	12	13	14	15	16	17	18	19
2013					STP	ALA	LBH	SAO	INDY	DET		TXS	MIL	IOW	POC	TOR		MDO	SNM	BAL	HOU		FON
2013	Dallara DW12	Chevrolet IndyCar V6t	(United States) Buddy Lazier	91					31														
2014					STP	LBH	ALA	IMS	INDY	DET		TXS	HOU		POC	IOW	TOR		MDO	MIL	SNM	FON	
2014	Dallara DW12	Chevrolet IndyCar V6t	(United States) Buddy Lazier	91					32														
2015					STP	NOL	LBH	ALA	IMS	INDY	DET		TXS	TOR	FON	MIL	IOW	MDO	POC	SNM			
2015	Dallara DW12	Chevrolet IndyCar V6t	(United States) Buddy Lazier	91						DNQ													
2016					STP	PHX	LBH	ALA	IMS	INDY	DET		ROA	IOW	TOR	MDO	POC	TXS	WGL	SNM			
2016	Dallara DW12	Chevrolet IndyCar V6t	(United States) Buddy Lazier	4						30													
2017					STP	LBH	ALA	PHX	IMS	INDY	DET		TEX	ROA	IOW	TOR	MDO	POC	GAT	WGL	SNM		
2017	Dallara DW12	Chevrolet IndyCar V6t	(United States) Buddy Lazier	44						29													
