= 2013 IndyCar Series =

American auto racing season

2013 IndyCar season
- IZOD IndyCar Series

Season
- Races: 19
- Start date: March 24
- End date: October 19

Awards
- Drivers' champion: (New Zealand) Scott Dixon
- Manufacturers' Cup: (United States) Chevrolet
- Rookie of the Year: (France) Tristan Vautier
- Indianapolis 500 winner: (Brazil) Tony Kanaan

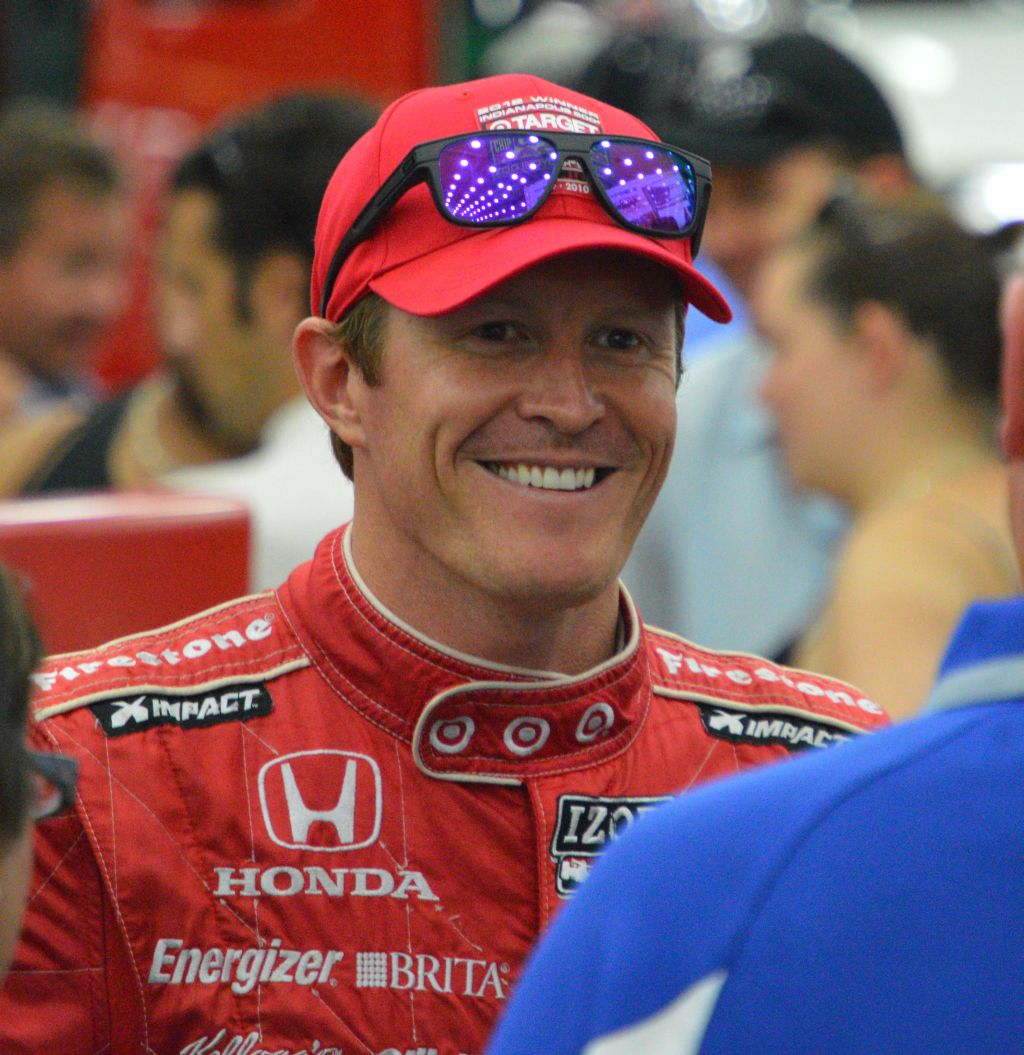
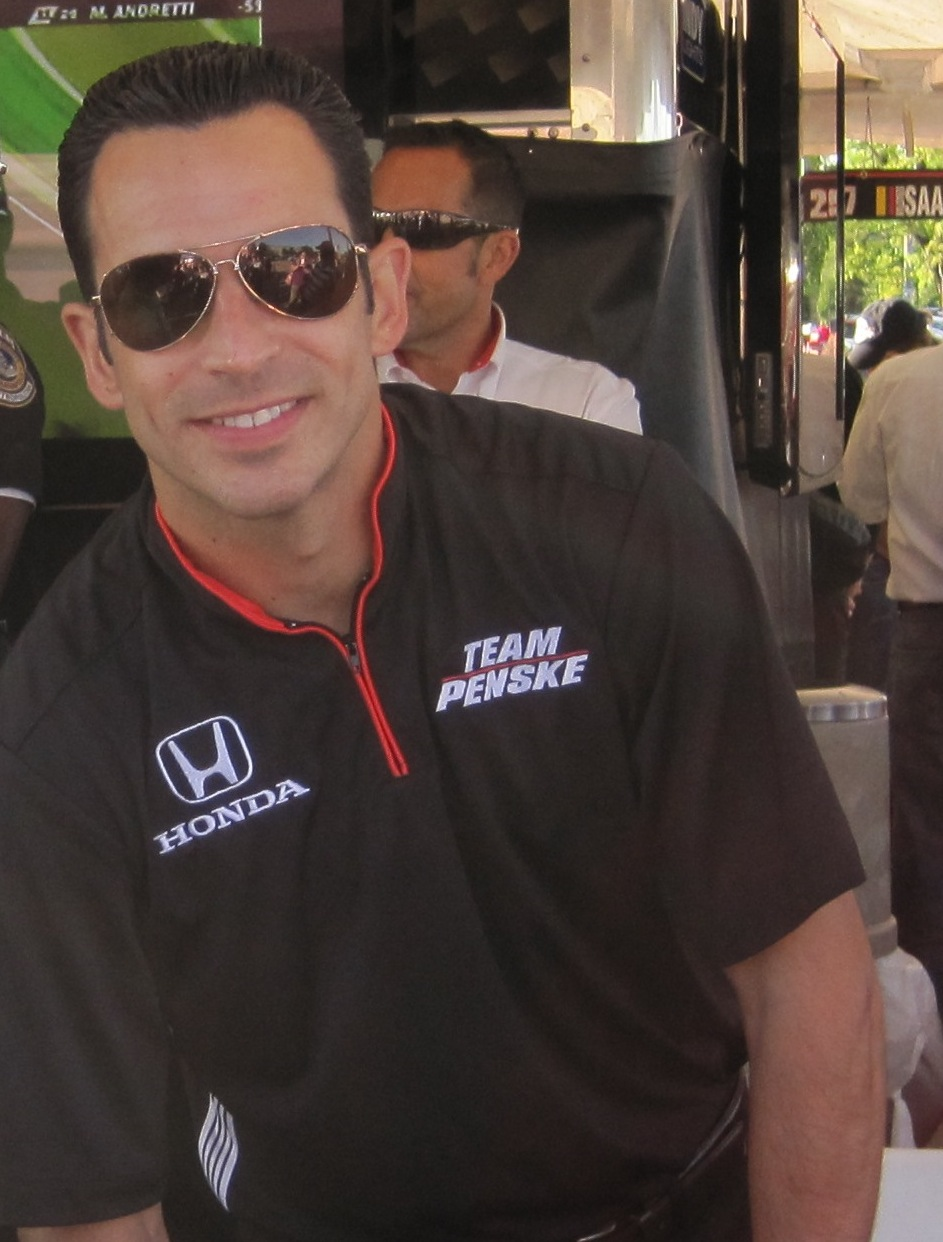
Scott Dixon (left) won his third Drivers' Championship while Hélio Castroneves (right) finished second in the championship.

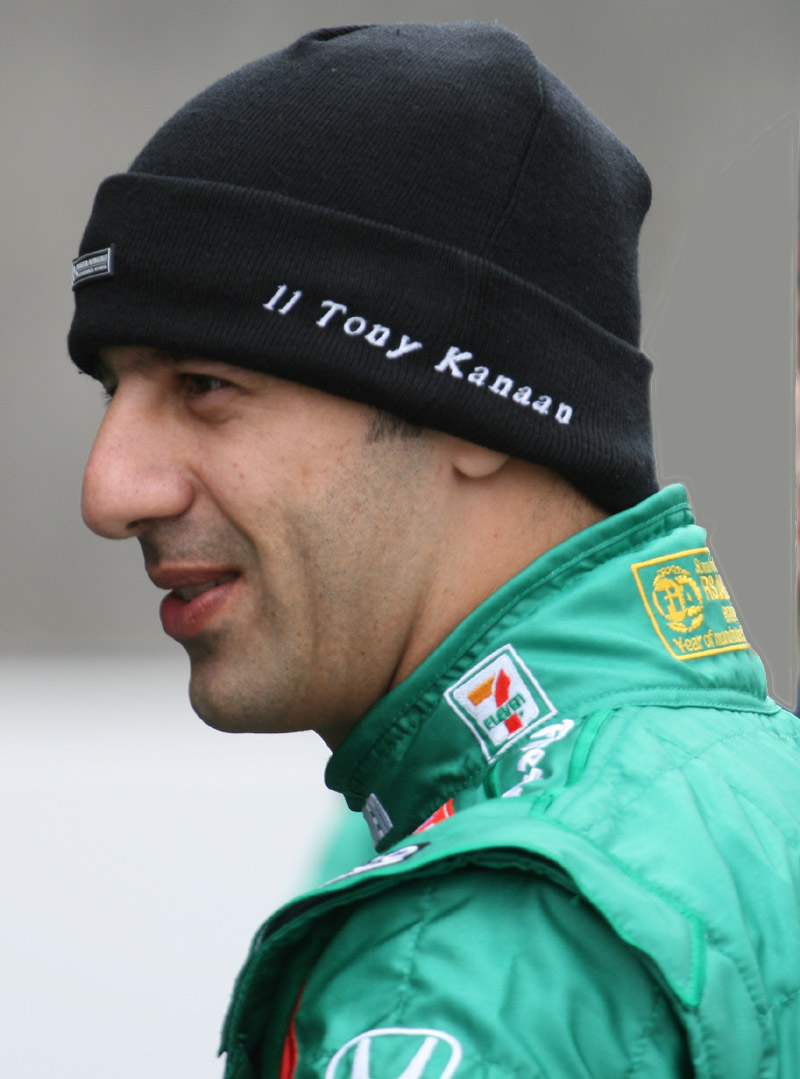
Tony Kanaan won the 2013 Indianapolis 500 after 11 previous attempts.

The 2013 IZOD IndyCar Series was the 18th season of the IndyCar Series and the 102nd season of American open wheel racing. Its premier event was the 97th Indianapolis 500 held on Sunday, May 26. The 2013 season was the second to feature the Dallara DW12 chassis. Ryan Hunter-Reay entered the season as the defending drivers' champion. Chevrolet entered as the defending Manufacturers' Cup champion.

The 2013 season has featured four first-time winners, the most since 1965. Also highlighting the season is the introduction of doubleheader races, and the experimentation with standing starts at selected events. Heading into the final race of the season, two-time champion Scott Dixon led Hélio Castroneves by 25 points in a two driver fight for the championship. In a race where only nine drivers finished, Dixon finished fifth while Castroneves finished sixth, and as a result, Dixon won his third series title by 27 points. In the manufacturers' championship, Chevrolet defended their title ahead of Honda.

After Lotus decided to withdraw from the IndyCar Series due to a poor 2012 season, the 2013 season marks the first season since 2002 that the series would feature only two engine manufacturers.

2013 was the final season that Izod—which became the main sponsor in the 2010 IndyCar Series—was the main sponsor of the championship; as Verizon Communications was announced as the new series sponsor for the 2014 season.

This was the last season to feature four-time champion Dario Franchitti as in race two in Houston, Franchitti would be involved in an accident that would ultimately end his career after 12 seasons in IndyCar. This would also be the final season of E. J. Viso's IndyCar career. For 2014 and beyond, Viso would focus more on Sports cars and Stadium Super Trucks.

This was also the last season that the series featured an outside North American International races to date. For 2014 and beyond all IndyCar Series races would be held exclusively in North American sub-continent only.

== Confirmed entries ==
- All chassis are composed of a Dallara DW12 "IndyCar Safety Cell" base chassis, and Dallara aerokit. All teams run Firestone tires. On December 21, 2012, Firestone signed a five-year contract extension with IndyCar. Firestone is the official supplier for IndyCar through 2018.

Team	Engine	No.	Driver(s)	Round(s)
A. J. Foyt Enterprises	Honda	14	(Japan) Takuma Sato	All
A. J. Foyt Enterprises	Honda	41	(United States) Conor Daly R	5
Andretti Autosport	Chevrolet	1	(United States) Ryan Hunter-Reay	All
Andretti Autosport	Chevrolet	25	(United States) Marco Andretti	All
Andretti Autosport	Chevrolet	26	(Colombia) Carlos Muñoz R	5
Andretti Autosport	Chevrolet	27	(Canada) James Hinchcliffe	All
Team Venezuela / Andretti Autosport / HVM	Chevrolet	5	(Venezuela) E. J. Viso	1–18
Team Venezuela / Andretti Autosport / HVM	Chevrolet	5	(Colombia) Carlos Muñoz R	19
Barracuda Racing	Honda	98	(Canada) Alex Tagliani	1–13
Barracuda Racing	Honda	98	(Italy) Luca Filippi R	14, 16–18
Barracuda Racing	Honda	98	(United States) J. R. Hildebrand	15, 19
Chip Ganassi Racing	Honda	8	(Australia) Ryan Briscoe	5
Chip Ganassi Racing	Honda	9	(New Zealand) Scott Dixon	All
Chip Ganassi Racing	Honda	10	(United Kingdom) Dario Franchitti (Note: Injured at Houston heat 2.)	1–18
Chip Ganassi Racing	Honda	10	(Canada) Alex Tagliani	19
Chip Ganassi Racing	Honda	83	(United States) Charlie Kimball	All
Dale Coyne Racing	Honda	18	(Brazil) Ana Beatriz	1–5, 9–10
Dale Coyne Racing	Honda	18	(United Kingdom) Mike Conway	6–7, 12–13, 17–18
Dale Coyne Racing	Honda	18	(United Kingdom) Pippa Mann	8, 11, 19
Dale Coyne Racing	Honda	18	(Australia) James Davison R	14–15
Dale Coyne Racing	Honda	18	(United Kingdom) Stefan Wilson R	16
Dale Coyne Racing	Honda	19	(United Kingdom) Justin Wilson	All
Dale Coyne Racing	Honda	63	(United Kingdom) Pippa Mann	5
Dragon Racing	Chevrolet	6	(Colombia) Sebastián Saavedra	All
Dragon Racing	Chevrolet	7	(France) Sébastien Bourdais	All
Ed Carpenter Racing	Chevrolet	20	(United States) Ed Carpenter	All
KV Racing Technology	Chevrolet	11	(Brazil) Tony Kanaan (Note: Run in conjunction with SH Racing.)	All
KV Racing Technology	Chevrolet	78	(Switzerland) Simona de Silvestro	All
Lazier Partners Racing	Chevrolet	91	(United States) Buddy Lazier	5
Panther Racing	Chevrolet	4	(United States) J. R. Hildebrand	1–5
Panther Racing	Chevrolet	4	(Australia) Ryan Briscoe	6–7, 9, 11–12, 15
Panther Racing	Chevrolet	4	(Spain) Oriol Servià	8, 10, 14, 16–19
Panther Racing	Chevrolet	4	(Colombia) Carlos Muñoz R	13
Panther Racing	Chevrolet	60	(United States) Townsend Bell	5
Panther Dreyer & Reinbold Racing	Chevrolet	22	(Spain) Oriol Servià	1–5
Rahal Letterman Lanigan Racing	Honda	15	(United States) Graham Rahal	All
Rahal Letterman Lanigan Racing	Honda	16	(United Kingdom) James Jakes	All
Rahal Letterman Lanigan Racing	Honda	17	(United Kingdom) Mike Conway	3
Rahal Letterman Lanigan Racing	Honda	17	(Mexico) Michel Jourdain Jr.	5
Sarah Fisher Hartman Racing	Honda	67	(United States) Josef Newgarden	All
Sarah Fisher Hartman Racing	Honda	97	(Germany) Lucas Luhr R (Note: In conjunction with RW Motorsports.)	15
Schmidt Peterson Motorsports	Honda	55	(France) Tristan Vautier R	All
Schmidt Peterson Motorsports	Honda	81	(United Kingdom) Katherine Legge (Note: In conjunction with Team Pelfrey.)	5
Schmidt Hamilton Motorsports	Honda	77	(France) Simon Pagenaud	All
Team Penske	Chevrolet	2	(United States) A. J. Allmendinger (Note: Not considered a rookie due to prior Champ Car experience.)	2–3, 5–7, 19
Team Penske	Chevrolet	3	(Brazil) Hélio Castroneves	All
Team Penske	Chevrolet	12	(Australia) Will Power	All

=== Driver changes ===
- A. J. Allmendinger, after being released by Penske Racing's NASCAR team for violating the sports substance abuse policy, returned to the team to take over the No. 2 car vacated by Ryan Briscoe. Allmendinger tested with Team Penske at Sebring on February 18 and 19, 2013. Satisfied with the test results, Allmendinger drove the No. 2 at Barber, Long Beach, Detroit, the Indianapolis 500, and Fontana.
- Rubens Barrichello left the IndyCar Series to compete in Brazilian stock car racing for the 2013 season after failing to find a sponsor to continue in IndyCar.
- Graham Rahal moved from Chip Ganassi Racing to Rahal Letterman Lanigan Racing.
- Simona de Silvestro moved from HVM Racing to KV Racing Technology.
- Takuma Sato left Rahal Letterman Lanigan Racing for A. J. Foyt Enterprises.
- James Jakes left Dale Coyne Racing for Rahal Letterman Lanigan Racing.
- E. J. Viso left KV Racing Technology to join in a 3 team alliance between his own Team Venezuela, Andretti Autosport, and HVM Racing. Andretti continued to run as a three car operation, but supplied Viso's team as a satellite fourth car in conjunction with HVM.
- After running a partial 2012 season with Andretti Autosport, Sebastián Saavedra joined Dragon Racing for the 2013 season, replacing Katherine Legge.

==== Mid-season changes ====
- On May 30, 2013 Panther Racing announced it was terminating its contract with driver J. R. Hildebrand by mutual consent. On the same day, the team announced Ryan Briscoe would replace Hildebrand for the races at Belle Isle.
- On July 26, 2013 Barracuda Racing asked Alex Tagliani to relinquish driving the team's entry for the rest of the season. Luca Filippi drove the #98 at Mid-Ohio. J. R. Hildebrand, as well as Filippi, was being considered for the #98 car for the remainder of the season.

== Schedule ==
The 2013 IndyCar Series schedule was formally announced on Speed's WindTunnel with Dave Despain, on the evening of September 30, 2012. The schedule consisted of nineteen races, hosted across sixteen venues. Included were three doubleheader events – with one race of the Toronto and Houston doubleheader featuring a standing start (Belle Isle did not utilize a standing start due to the narrowness of the start-finish area). The IndyCar Triple Crown returned for the first time since 1989, featuring the races at Indianapolis, Pocono and Fontana. IndyCar offered a $1,000,000 bonus to a driver who can win all three events, with a $250,000 consolation prize if a driver can win two of the three events.

Icon	Legend
O	Oval/Speedway
R	Road course
S	Street circuit
BOLD	Fuzzy's Ultra Premium Vodka Triple Crown event.

Rnd	Date	Race name	Track	Location
1	March 24	Honda Grand Prix of St. Petersburg	S Streets of St. Petersburg	St. Petersburg, Florida
2	April 7	Honda Indy Grand Prix of Alabama	R Barber Motorsports Park	Birmingham, Alabama
3	April 21	39th Toyota Grand Prix of Long Beach	S Streets of Long Beach	Long Beach, California
4	May 5	Itaipava São Paulo Indy 300	S Streets of São Paulo	São Paulo, Brazil
5	May 26	97th Indianapolis 500-Mile Race	O Indianapolis Motor Speedway	Speedway, Indiana
6	June 1	Chevrolet Indy Dual in Detroit	S Detroit Belle Isle street circuit	Detroit, Michigan
7	June 2	Chevrolet Indy Dual in Detroit	S Detroit Belle Isle street circuit	Detroit, Michigan
8	June 8	Firestone 550	O Texas Motor Speedway	Fort Worth, Texas
9	June 15	Milwaukee IndyFest	O Milwaukee Mile	West Allis, Wisconsin
10	June 23	Iowa Corn Indy 250	O Iowa Speedway	Newton, Iowa
11	July 7	Pocono IndyCar 400	O Pocono Raceway	Long Pond, Pennsylvania
12	July 13	Honda Indy Toronto	S Exhibition Place	Toronto, Ontario
13	July 14	Honda Indy Toronto	S Exhibition Place	Toronto, Ontario
14	August 4	Honda Indy 200 at Mid-Ohio	R Mid-Ohio Sports Car Course	Lexington, Ohio
15	August 25	GoPro Indy Grand Prix of Sonoma	R Sonoma Raceway	Sonoma, California
16	September 1	Grand Prix of Baltimore	S Streets of Baltimore	Baltimore, Maryland
17	October 5	Shell and Pennzoil Grand Prix of Houston	S Reliant Park	Houston, Texas
18	October 6	Shell and Pennzoil Grand Prix of Houston	S Reliant Park	Houston, Texas
19	October 19	MAVTV 500 IndyCar World Championships	O Auto Club Speedway	Fontana, California

=== Schedule development ===
- The Detroit Belle Isle Grand Prix returned to the 2.346 miles (3.776 km) track layout used from 1998 to 2001.
- IndyCar went to Pocono Raceway July 7, 2013, for a 400-mile (640 km) race. It was the first open-wheel race at Pocono since 1989. A contract had been signed to continue the event through 2015.
- The Edmonton Indy did not return after the promoter Octane Motorsports made a business decision not to promote the race in 2013. The city announced that they would not seek another promoter.
- The Grand Prix of Houston at Reliant Park returned to American open-wheel racing as an IndyCar Series event on October 4–6. Mi-Jack Promotions, Reliant Park, and IndyCar have signed a contract for the event through 2017. Shell has signed a 4-year title sponsorship deal for the event with dual branding of their lubricants division. The event was last run as a Champ Car event in 2007.
- IndyCar had discussions to add a twentieth round of the championship at a circuit in Europe. Venues put forward as candidates for the event include Monza, Imola, and Mugello. The event failed to materialize, and the series moved its international focus towards the possibility of adding races to the series in 2015 at the earliest.

== Results ==
Rd.	Race	Pole position	Fastest lap	Most laps led	Race Winner			Report
Rd.	Race	Pole position	Fastest lap	Most laps led	Driver	Team	Manufacturer	Report
1	St. Petersburg	(Australia) Will Power	(Australia) Will Power	(Brazil) Hélio Castroneves	(Canada) James Hinchcliffe	Andretti Autosport	Chevrolet	Report
2	Birmingham	(United States) Ryan Hunter-Reay	(United Kingdom) James Jakes	(United States) Ryan Hunter-Reay	(United States) Ryan Hunter-Reay	Andretti Autosport	Chevrolet	Report
3	Long Beach	(United Kingdom) Dario Franchitti	(Venezuela) E. J. Viso	(Japan) Takuma Sato	(Japan) Takuma Sato	A. J. Foyt Enterprises	Honda	Report
4	São Paulo	(United States) Ryan Hunter-Reay	(Brazil) Tony Kanaan	(Japan) Takuma Sato	(Canada) James Hinchcliffe	Andretti Autosport	Chevrolet	Report
5	Indianapolis	(United States) Ed Carpenter	(United Kingdom) Justin Wilson	(United States) Ed Carpenter	(Brazil) Tony Kanaan	KV Racing Technology	Chevrolet	Report
6	Detroit 1	(United Kingdom) Dario Franchitti (Note: Franchitti, the fastest qualifier from the Fast Six shootout, was assessed a 10-place grid penalty for an unapproved engine change. E. J. Viso, who qualified 2nd, was the highest-placed driver not to have a penalty, and thus started the race from pole position. Franchitti earned the pole-winner's championship point.)	(United Kingdom) Mike Conway	(United Kingdom) Mike Conway	(United Kingdom) Mike Conway	Dale Coyne Racing	Honda	Report
7	Detroit 2	(United Kingdom) Mike Conway (Note: The qualification format for the second Detroit doubleheader race featured two separate qualification groups, with the fastest qualifier in each group earning a championship point; the faster of the two group fastest qualifiers would then start on pole, while the other would start from the outside of the front row. James Jakes earned the second championship point and started from the outside of the front row.)	(United Kingdom) Mike Conway	(United Kingdom) Mike Conway	(France) Simon Pagenaud	Schmidt Hamilton Motorsports	Honda	Report
8	Texas	(Australia) Will Power	(Brazil) Tony Kanaan	(Brazil) Hélio Castroneves	(Brazil) Hélio Castroneves	Team Penske	Chevrolet	Report
9	Milwaukee	(United States) Marco Andretti	(United States) Ryan Hunter-Reay	(Japan) Takuma Sato	(United States) Ryan Hunter-Reay	Andretti Autosport	Chevrolet	Report
10	Iowa	(Brazil) Hélio Castroneves (Note: The starting lineup for the event was formed via three 50-lap heat races; the third of which, decided the top ten starting order for the race. Castroneves, the winner of that race, was assessed a 10-place grid penalty for an unapproved engine change. Will Power, who finished 2nd, was the highest-placed driver not to have a penalty, and thus started the race from pole position. Castroneves earned the pole-winner's nine championship points.)	(United States) Ed Carpenter	(Canada) James Hinchcliffe	(Canada) James Hinchcliffe	Andretti Autosport	Chevrolet	Report
11	Pocono	(United States) Marco Andretti	(Japan) Takuma Sato	(United States) Marco Andretti	(New Zealand) Scott Dixon	Chip Ganassi Racing	Honda	Report
12	Toronto 1	(United Kingdom) Dario Franchitti	(Brazil) Hélio Castroneves	(Australia) Will Power	(New Zealand) Scott Dixon	Chip Ganassi Racing	Honda	Report
13	Toronto 2	(New Zealand) Scott Dixon (Note: The qualification format for the second Toronto doubleheader race featured two separate qualification groups, with the fastest qualifier in each group earning a championship point; the faster of the two group fastest qualifiers would then start on pole, while the other would start from the outside of the front row. Dario Franchitti earned the second championship point and started from the outside of the front row.)	(United Kingdom) Dario Franchitti	(New Zealand) Scott Dixon	(New Zealand) Scott Dixon	Chip Ganassi Racing	Honda	Report
14	Mid-Ohio	(United States) Ryan Hunter-Reay	(France) Simon Pagenaud	(United States) Charlie Kimball	(United States) Charlie Kimball	Chip Ganassi Racing	Honda	Report
15	Sonoma	(United Kingdom) Dario Franchitti	(Australia) Will Power	(New Zealand) Scott Dixon	(Australia) Will Power	Team Penske	Chevrolet	Report
16	Baltimore	(New Zealand) Scott Dixon	(France) Sébastien Bourdais	(Australia) Will Power	(France) Simon Pagenaud	Schmidt Hamilton Motorsports	Honda	Report
17	Houston 1	(Japan) Takuma Sato (Note: The qualification format for the first Houston doubleheader race was altered due to track delays. It featured two separate qualification groups, with the fastest qualifier in each group earning a championship point; the faster of the two group fastest qualifiers would then start on pole, while the other would start from the outside of the front row. Will Power earned the second championship point and started from the outside of the front row.)	(Australia) Will Power	(New Zealand) Scott Dixon	(New Zealand) Scott Dixon	Chip Ganassi Racing	Honda	Report
18	Houston 2	(Brazil) Hélio Castroneves (Note: Qualifying was canceled, due to heavy rain. The grid order was established by entrant points prior to the event, but Castroneves was not awarded the pole-winner's championship point.)	(Italy) Luca Filippi	(Australia) Will Power	(Australia) Will Power	Team Penske	Chevrolet	Report
19	Fontana	(Australia) Will Power	(Canada) James Hinchcliffe	(Australia) Will Power	(Australia) Will Power	Team Penske	Chevrolet	Report

== Race summaries ==
=== Round 1: St. Petersburg ===
James Hinchcliffe won the first IndyCar race of his career, taking the lead from Hélio Castroneves on a restart on lap 85 of 110. Hinchcliffe held off Castroneves by 1.09 seconds, with Marco Andretti finishing third, passing Simona de Silvestro for the position on the final lap.

Will Power dominated the early parts of the race, but dropped to 16th at the finish after contact with J. R. Hildebrand. Dario Franchitti finished last after an early crash, and defending series champion Ryan Hunter-Reay dropped out with mechanical problems.

=== Round 2: Barber ===
Ryan Hunter-Reay won the pole position and led 53 laps en route to victory. After a sequence of pit stops around lap 50, Hélio Castroneves led. Hunter-Reay caught up and passed Castroneves for the lead on lap 76, with Scott Dixon moving up to second. Hunter-Reay held off the charge of Dixon over the last 5–10 laps, to seal the win. Castroneves held on to finish third. Will Power started second, but slid off the track in turn one at the start, losing several positions. After working his way back to the front for two laps, he came home 5th.

=== Round 3: Long Beach ===
Takuma Sato led 50 of 80 laps, and won his first career IndyCar race at the 39th annual Toyota Grand Prix of Long Beach. Sato effectively took control of the race on lap 23, when he passed Ryan Hunter-Reay for second place in turn 1. After the leaders cycled through pit stops, Sato assumed the lead on lap 31, and did not relinquish the top spot for the remainder of the race. Sato's win was the first for A. J. Foyt Enterprises since 2002 and their first ever (in the team's 34th season) not on an Oval.

Top teams Penske, Ganassi, and Andretti were all shut out of the podium. In addition, contenders and Andretti teammates James Hinchcliffe and Hunter-Reay both dropped out early due to contact.

=== Round 4: São Paulo ===
In the dramatic closing laps, Takuma Sato was leading, looking for his second consecutive victory. Josef Newgarden was running second, and in third was a hard-charging James Hinchcliffe. Newgarden challenged Sato for the lead with a few laps to go, but Sato held the lead. Hinchcliffe then managed to take over second, and set his sights on Sato. On the backstretch, Hinchcliffe went side-by-side, but again Sato held the lead, with what some thought may have been intentional 'blocking.' On the final lap, Hinchcliffe again tried for the lead on the backstretch, and again Sato aggressively defended his position. At the end of the backstretch, going into the final turn, Sato slid high, and Hinchcliffe slipped by on the inside to take the win by 0.3463 seconds. At the same time, Marco Andretti made a similar pass for third place, to round out the podium.

=== Round 5: Indianapolis 500 ===
A race record 68 lead changes amongst 14 different drivers highlighted the most competitive and fastest Indy 500 in history. On a restart with three laps to go, Ryan Hunter-Reay led rookie Carlos Muñoz, Tony Kanaan, and Marco Andretti. At the green flag, the top three cars went three-wide into turn one, with Kanaan taking the lead. Seconds later, Dario Franchitti hit the outside wall in turn one, bringing out the race ending final caution. Tony Kanaan completed the final two laps in the lead under yellow, and won his first Indy 500, a popular victory after eleven previous unsuccessful attempts.

=== Round 6: Detroit (Sat.) ===
The first race of the Detroit Grand Prix (IndyCar) saw part-time driver Mike Conway dominate. The series began utilizing a revised and upgraded version of the Belle Isle circuit, a layout used by CART from 1998 to 2001. Conway took the lead on lap 44 and led a total of 47 laps en route to victory. In the second half, Conway pulled out to an insurmountable 20-second lead at one point.

=== Round 7: Detroit (Sun.) ===
Mike Conway started from the pole position and looked to sweep the weekend of races in the second race of the Chevrolet Dual at Detroit. Conway led 31 of the first 45 laps, but after a sequence of pit stops, and a failed tire strategy, was shuffled back to third in the closing stages. After a ten-car accident that took out several front-runners, the final stint shaped up as a three-car battle between Simon Pagenaud, James Jakes, and Conway. Pagenaud came to the lead when Jakes pitted on lap 58. Jakes came back out on the track close behind, with Conway charging in third. Pagenaud held off the challenge, and won his first-career IndyCar race, and the first victory for Schmidt Hamilton Motorsports.

=== Round 8: Texas ===
Hélio Castroneves dominated en route to his first win of the season, and Team Penske's first victory of 2013. Castroneves led the final 132 laps, and won over second place Ryan Hunter-Reay by 4.6919 seconds. However, Castroneves' car failed post-race inspection due to an illegal underwing. The team was fined $35,000 but Castroneves maintained the victory.

=== Round 9: Milwaukee ===
Ryan Hunter-Reay won for the second year in a row at Milwaukee, taking the lead from Takuma Sato with 53 laps to go, after executing a daring pass on Hélio Castroneves only a few laps before. Marco Andretti started on the pole and led 61 laps, but an electrical problem dropped him from contention. The combination of these events meant Hunter-Reay passed his Andretti Autosport teammate for 2nd in the championship.

=== Round 10: Iowa ===
James Hinchcliffe led 226 of 250 laps, dominating his way to victory. Second place Ryan Hunter-Reay mounted a charge in the waning laps as Hinchcliffe developed some handling problems, but fell short at the finish. Hélio Castroneves finished 8th, but held on to the championship points lead.

=== Round 11: Pocono ===
IndyCars returned to Pocono for the first time since 1989. Marco Andretti started on the pole, and dominated most of the first half. His fuel stop strategy, however, forced him to conserve late in the race, and dropped him to a 10th-place finish. Early contenders Ryan Hunter-Reay and Takuma Sato dropped out when Sato overshot the entrance to pit road, slamming into Hunter-Reay's car from behind. In the late stages, Ganassi teammates Scott Dixon, Charlie Kimball, and Dario Franchitti came to the front after a well-executed final pit stop strategy. Dixon led the Ganassi sweep of the podium, owner Chip Ganassi's first 1–2–3 sweep, the team's 100th Indycar win, and the 200th victory for Honda in the series.

=== Round 12: Toronto (Sat.) ===
The second doubleheader of the season was held at Toronto. The Saturday race was scheduled to utilize a standing start, but it was waved off when Josef Newgarden stalled on the track. Scott Dixon won, while Sébastien Bourdais finished second, his first open-wheel podium since 2007.

=== Round 13: Toronto (Sun.) ===
Scott Dixon swept the second race of the doubleheader, as well as winning his third consecutive race overall. After waving off the previous day, the Sunday race utilized a standing start, the first American Indycar race to utilize a standing start in modern times.

=== Round 14: Mid-Ohio ===
Charlie Kimball became the fourth first-time winner of the season, and the 9th different winner in 14 races. Kimball took the lead for good on lap 73 of 90, and won even after crashing his primary car earlier in the weekend. Some drivers in the field were attempting to execute a two-stop strategy, but in doing so, fuel-saving measures were needed. In a race that went without a caution, Kimball's race strategist made the call to switch to a three-stop run, which allowed a much faster pace, and Kimball pulled away to a commanding victory.

On the final lap, 6th place Hélio Castroneves held off Scott Dixon at the line, allowing him to leave the weekend with a 31-point lead in the championship standings.

=== Round 15: Sonoma ===
Lucas Luhr made his IndyCar Series debut, driving the #97 Honda for Sarah Fisher Hartman Racing. J. R. Hildebrand drove the #98 car for Barracuda Racing. Dario Franchitti won the pole. Will Power and Scott Dixon battled most of the race, but when Dixon hit one of Power's crew members, Dixon received a drive-through penalty. Power led the final sixteen laps to take his first win of the season, and as a result, Power became the tenth different winner of the 2013 season.

=== Round 16: Baltimore ===
Simon Pagenaud won his second race of the season. Hélio Castroneves finished 9th, and maintained the points lead.

=== Round 17: Houston (Sat.) ===
The first race of the Houston doubleheader saw Scott Dixon win, and points leader Hélio Castroneves struggle. Castroneves suffered mechanical problems and came home 18th. Dixon closed the championship deficit to 8 points with two events remaining.

=== Round 18: Houston (Sun.) ===
The second race of the Houston doubleheader was won by Will Power, and Scott Dixon came home second. For the second day in a row, Hélio Castroneves suffered gearbox troubles, which relegated him to a 23rd-place finish. Dixon took the points lead for the first time, holding a 25-point advantage with one race left.

This race however was marred by a major crash involving Dario Franchitti, Takuma Sato and E. J. Viso on the final lap. Franchitti touched wheels with Sato and his car was launched up into the catch fence. Debris injured thirteen spectators, while Franchitti was hospitalized with a concussion, fractured ankle, and two spinal fractures; these injuries forced him to retire from racing. Sato and Viso were uninjured.

=== Round 19: Fontana ===
Before this race it was announced by Team Penske that A. J. Allmendinger would return to the team, driving their #2 Chevrolet. J. R. Hildebrand was announced by Barracuda Racing to drive their #98 Honda.

Will Power, from the pole, quickly lost the lead to a faster Sébastien Bourdais who dominated the first quarter of the race. Meanwhile, Castroneves went from 10th to 5th place and watched the battle for the lead between Kanaan, Hunter-Reay, Bourdais and a fast Carlos Muñoz while Dixon kept the pace in 15th place.

At lap 111, Justin Wilson lost the rear of his car and was avoided by Josef Newgarden who collected Oriol Servià in the process. Then Wilson was hit by Tristan Vautier involving also James Jakes and Simona de Silvestro in the accident. Wilson was sent to the local hospital with minor fractures.

At the checkered flag Will Power finally grabbed the win at Fontana, followed by Ed Carpenter and Tony Kanaan. Dixon finished in 5th place, which was enough to give him the season title, while Castroneves had a tough night and finished 6th. Dixon become the new Indycar Series Champion, winning previously in 2003 and 2008 making him a three-time champion. This race was also a battle of attrition as only 9 of the 25 starters finished the race.

== Points standings ==
- Ties in points broken by number of wins, followed by number of 2nds, 3rds, etc., and then by number of pole positions, followed by number of times qualified 2nd, etc.

=== Driver standings ===
- One point is awarded to any driver who leads at least one lap during a race. Two additional points are awarded to the driver who leads the most laps in a race.
- Bonus points are awarded for qualifying performance:
  - At all tracks except Indianapolis and Iowa, the driver who qualifies on pole earns one point.
    - In qualifying for race two of a double header weekend, the fastest driver in each of the two qualifying groups receives a bonus point.
  - At Indianapolis, drivers who advance to Q2 earn bonus points. Drivers who qualify tenth through twenty-fourth earn four qualifying points, and the remaining qualifying drivers earn three points.
  - At Iowa, the third-place driver in the first two heat races earn one bonus. The ten drivers who qualified for the third heat race earn points based on the result of that race.

Pos	Driver	STP	BAR	LBH	SAO	Indy 500	BEL		TMS	MIL	IOW	POC	TOR		MOH	SON	BAL	HOU		CAL	Pts
1	(New Zealand) Scott Dixon	5	2	11	18	14^{16}	4	4	23	6	16^{5}	1	1	**1***	7	15*	**19**	1*	2	5	577
2	(Brazil) Hélio Castroneves	2*	3	10	13	6^{8}	5	8	1*	2	**8**^{1}	8	6	2	6	7	9	18	**23**^{c}	6	550
3	(France) Simon Pagenaud	24	6	8	9	8^{21}	12	1	13	12	6^{11}	6	9	12	2	5	1	4	6	13	508
4	(Australia) Will Power	**16**	5	16	24	19^{6}	8	20	**7**	3	17^{2}	4	15*	18	4	1	18*	12	1*	**1***	498
5	(United States) Marco Andretti	3	7	7	3	4^{3}	20	6	5	**20**	9^{4}	**10***	4	9	9	4	10	13	20	7	484
6	(United Kingdom) Justin Wilson	9	8	3	20	5^{14}	3	22	15	9	11	7	11	8	8	2	4	3	4	18	472
7	(United States) Ryan Hunter-Reay	18	**1***	24	**11**	3^{7}	2	18	2	1	2	20	18	19	**5**	6	20	20	21	9	469
8	(Canada) James Hinchcliffe	1	26	26	1	21^{9}	15	19	9	5	1*^{3}	24	8	21	10	8	7	24	3	4	449
9	(United States) Charlie Kimball	12	4	21	10	9^{19}	14	7	17	17	12	2	21	6	1*	20	6	11	8	10	427
10	(United Kingdom) Dario Franchitti	25	25	**4**	7	23^{17}	**6**	5	6	8	20	3	**3**	4	3	**3**	21	15	15		418
11	(Brazil) Tony Kanaan	4	13	20	21	1^{12}	13	12	3	10	3^{8}	13	5	24	24	13	15	21	24	3	397
12	(France) Sébastien Bourdais	11	16	15	14	29^{15}	24	11	20	22	14	16	2	3	12	10	3	8	5	12	370
13	(Switzerland) Simona de Silvestro	6	18	9	8	17^{24}	16	24	16	24	21	11	10	14	11	9	5	2	10	8	362
14	(United States) Josef Newgarden	23	9	13	5	28^{25}	7	16	8	11	15	5	23	11	23	24	2	5	13	20	348
15	(Venezuela) E. J. Viso	7	12	22	6	18^{4}	17	17	10	4	10	21	14	5	17	14	13	9	16		340
16	(United States) Ed Carpenter	14	22	18	23	**10***^{1}	18	15	4	14	4^{6}	9	13	22	20	19	14	23	22	2	333
17	(Japan) Takuma Sato	8	14	1*	2*	13^{18}	19	23	11	7*	23^{7}	22	24	20	22	23	24	**17**	14	17	322
18	(United States) Graham Rahal	13	21	2	22	25^{26}	9	9	21	16	5^{9}	18	20	13	18	11	17	7	18	15	319
19	(United Kingdom) James Jakes	15	23	12	17	20^{20}	10	2	12	18	18	12	12	23	13	25	23	6	17	22	294
20	(France) Tristan Vautier RY	21	10	17	16	16^{28}	11	14	18	21	13	19	19	16	21	12	11	22	11	21	266
21	(Colombia) Sebastián Saavedra	20	20	27	19	32^{27}	22	10	14	13	19	23	16	15	19	21	8	14	12	24	236
22	(Spain) Oriol Servià	17	15	6	4	11^{13}			19		7^{10}				14		12	19	7	19	233
23	(United Kingdom) Mike Conway			25			1*	**3***					7	7				16	9		185
24	(Canada) Alex Tagliani	10	11	19	12	24^{11}	23	21	22	23	24^{12}	17	17	10						14	180
25	(United States) J. R. Hildebrand	19	17	5	15	33^{10}										16				11	112
26	(Australia) Ryan Briscoe					12^{23}	21	13		15		14	22			17					100
27	(United States) A. J. Allmendinger		19	23		7^{5}	25	25												16	79
28	(Colombia) Carlos Muñoz R					2^{2}								17						23	74
29	(Brazil) Ana Beatriz	22	24	14	25	15^{29}				19	22										72
30	(Italy) Luca Filippi R														16		22	10	19		53
31	(United Kingdom) Pippa Mann					30^{30}			24			15								25	34
32	(Australia) James Davison R														15	18					27
33	(United Kingdom) Stefan Wilson R																16				14
34	(United States) Conor Daly R					22^{31}															11
35	(United States) Townsend Bell					27^{22}															10
36	(Germany) Lucas Luhr R															22					8
37	(United Kingdom) Katherine Legge					26^{33}															8
38	(United States) Buddy Lazier					31^{32}															8
—	(Mexico) Michel Jourdain Jr.					DNQ															0
Pos	Driver	STP	BAR	LBH	SAO	Indy 500	BEL		TMS	MIL	IOW	POC	TOR		MOH	SON	BAL	HOU		CAL	Pts

Color	Result
Gold	Winner
Silver	2nd place
Bronze	3rd place
Green	4th & 5th place
Light Blue	6th–10th place
Dark Blue	Finished (Outside Top 10)
Purple	Did not finish
Red	Did not qualify (DNQ)
Brown	Withdrawn (Wth)
Black	Disqualified (DSQ)
White	Did Not Start (DNS)
White	Race abandoned (C)
Blank	Did not participate

**In-line notation**
**Bold**	Pole position (1 point; except Indy and Iowa)
Italics	Ran fastest race lap
*	Led most race laps (2 points)
DNS	Any driver who qualifies but does not start (DNS), earns half the points had they taken part.
^{1–33}	Results for the Indy 500 qualifying and the top 12 drivers in the Iowa qualifying heats.
^{c}	Qualifying canceled no bonus point awarded
RY Rookie of the Year
R Rookie

=== Entrant standings ===
- Based on the entrant, used for oval qualifications order, and starting grids when qualifying is cancelled.
- Only full-time entrants, and at-large part-time entrants shown.

Pos	Driver	STP	BAR	LBH	SAO	Indy 500	BEL		TMS	MIL	IOW	POC	TOR		MOH	SON	BAL	HOU		CAL	Pts
1	#9 Chip Ganassi Racing	5	2	11	18	14^{16}	4	4	23	6	16^{5}	1	1	**1***	7	15*	**19**	1*	2	5	577
2	#3 Team Penske	2*	3	10	13	6^{8}	5	8	1*	2	**8**^{1}	8	6	2	6	7	9	18	**23**^{1}	6	535^{1}
3	#77 Schmidt Hamilton Motorsports	24	6	8	9	8^{21}	12	1	13	12	6^{11}	6	9	12	2	5	1	4	6	13	508
4	#12 Team Penske	**16**	5	16	24	19^{6}	8	20	**7**	3	17^{2}	4	15*	18	4	1	18*	12	1*	**1***	498
5	#25 Andretti Autosport	3	7	7	3	4^{3}	20	6	5	**20**	9^{4}	**10***	4	9	9	4	10	13	20	7	484
6	#19 Dale Coyne Racing	9	8	3	20	5^{14}	3	22	15	9	11	7	11	8	8	2	4	3	4	18	472
7	#28 Andretti Autosport	18	**1***	24	**11**	3^{7}	2	18	2	1	2	20	18	19	**5**	6	20	20	21	9	469
8	#27 Andretti Autosport	1	26	26	1	21^{9}	15	19	9	5	1*^{3}	24	8	21	10	8	7	24	3	4	449
9	#10 Chip Ganassi Racing	25	25	**4**	7	23^{17}	**6**	5	6	8	20	3	**3**	4	3	**3**	21	15	15	14	435
10	#83 Chip Ganassi Racing	12	4	21	10	9^{19}	14	7	17	17	12	2	21	6	1*	20	6	11	8	10	427
11	#11 KV Racing Technology	4	13	20	21	1^{12}	13	12	3	10	3^{8}	13	5	24	24	13	15	21	24	3	397
12	#7 Dragon Racing	11	16	15	14	29^{15}	24	11	20	22	14	16	2	3	12	10	3	8	5	12	370
13	#78 KV Racing Technology	6	18	9	8	17^{24}	16	24	16	24	21	11	10	14	11	9	5	2	10	8	362
14	#67 Sarah Fisher Hartman Racing	23	9	13	5	28^{25}	7	16	8	11	15	5	23	11	23	24	2	5	13	20	348
15	#5 Team Venezuela / Andretti Autosport / HVM	7	12	22	6	18^{4}	17	17	10	4	10	21	14	5	17	14	13	9	16	23	347
16	#20 Ed Carpenter Racing	14	22	18	23	**10***^{1}	18	15	4	14	4^{6}	9	13	22	20	19	14	23	22	2	333
17	#14 A. J. Foyt Enterprises	8	14	1*	2*	13^{18}	19	23	11	7*	23^{7}	22	24	20	22	23	24	**17**	14	17	322
18	#18 Dale Coyne Racing	22	24	14	25	15^{29}	1*	**3***	24	19	22	15	7	7	15	18	16	16	9	25	319
19	#15 Rahal Letterman Lanigan Racing	13	21	2	22	25^{26}	9	9	21	16	5^{9}	18	20	13	18	11	17	7	18	15	319
20	#16 Rahal Letterman Lanigan Racing	15	23	12	17	20^{20}	10	2	12	18	18	12	12	23	13	25	23	6	17	22	294
21	#4 Panther Racing	19	17	5	15	33^{10}	21	13	19	15	7^{10}	14	22	17	14	17	12	19	7	19	291
22	#55 Schmidt Peterson Motorsports	21	10	17	16	16^{28}	11	14	18	21	13	19	19	16	21	12	11	22	11	21	266
23	#98 Barracuda Racing	10	11	19	12	24^{11}	23	21	22	23	24^{12}	17	17	10	16	16	22	10	19	11	249
24	#6 Dragon Racing	20	20	27	19	32^{27}	22	10	14	13	19	23	16	15	19	21	8	14	12	24	236
25	#22 Panther Dreyer & Reinbold Racing	17	15	6	4	11^{13}															112
26	#2 Team Penske		19	23		7^{5}	25	25												16	79
Pos	Driver	STP	BAR	LBH	SAO	Indy 500	BEL		TMS	MIL	IOW	POC	TOR		MOH	SON	BAL	HOU		CAL	Pts

1. The #3 entry was penalized 15 points for a technical infraction at Texas.
