= 2013 Iowa Corn Indy 250 =

(United States) 2013 Iowa Corn Indy 250
Race details
- 10th round of the 2013 IndyCar Series season
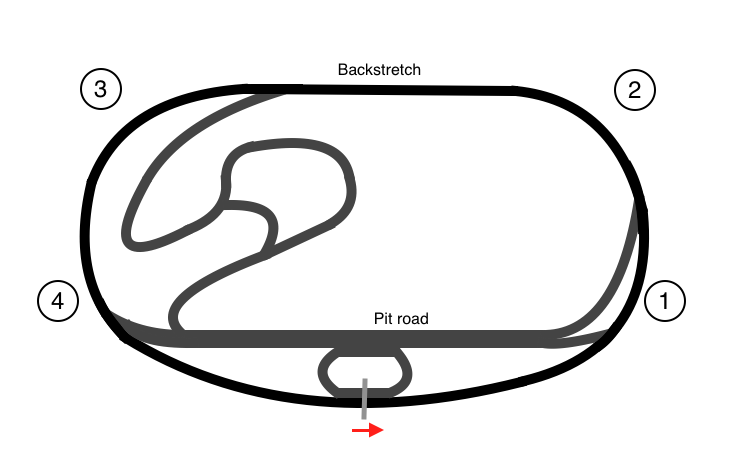
- Date: June 23, 2013
- Official name: Iowa Corn Indy 250
- Location: Iowa Speedway
- Course: Permanent racing facility 0.875 mi / 1.4 km
- Distance: 250 laps 218.75 mi / 352.044 km

Pole position
- Driver: (Brazil) Hélio Castroneves (Team Penske)
- Time: 17.3324

Podium
- First: (Canada) James Hinchcliffe (Andretti Autosport)
- Second: (United States) Ryan Hunter-Reay (Andretti Autosport)
- Third: (Brazil) Tony Kanaan (KV Racing Technology)

The 2013 Iowa Corn Indy 250 Presented by DEKALB, the seventh annual running of the event, was an IndyCar Series race held on June 23, 2013, at Iowa Speedway in Newton, Iowa. The race was the tenth round of the 2013 IndyCar Series season, and was won by James Hinchcliffe of Andretti Autosport.

== Report ==
=== Background ===
Iowa Speedway is the shortest track on the IndyCar schedule, being .875 miles long. Four of the first nine races in the season were dominated by Andretti Autosport drivers James Hinchcliffe and Ryan Hunter-Reay, each winning two races. The defending race winner was Hunter-Reay.

=== Qualifying ===
Hélio Castroneves of Team Penske set the one-lap track record in qualifying with a time of 17.3324 seconds and a speed of 185.65 mph (298.77 km/h), breaking the record set in 2008 by Ryan Briscoe. Castroneves also won the pole position after winning the qualifying heat race, but IndyCar officials ruled that Castroneves and his team had an improper engine change, changing engines before it ran the minimum 2,000 miles (3,218 km). Because of this, Penske teammate Will Power was given the pole, with James Hinchcliffe in second, Marco Andretti in third and Ed Carpenter in fourth, taking Scott Dixon's spot, who was also penalized for improperly changing engines. Defending race winner Ryan Hunter-Reay failed to advance out of the preliminary heat. The starting grid for the race was decided by three 50-lap heat races. Dixon won the first race, Graham Rahal won heat 2, and Castroneves won the final heat.

== Race ==
On lap one, James Hinchcliffe passed pole-sitter Will Power for the lead, and proceeded to dominate the race, leading all but 24 laps, a track-record 226 laps; he had led only 33 laps on ovals prior to the race. Hinchcliffe's teammate Ryan Hunter-Reay fell behind with early right front car damage early in the race, and was in 21st, but was able to reach second, but was slowed by lapped cars. Hinchcliffe beat Hunter-Reay to the finish by 1.5009 seconds, giving Andretti Autosport its second consecutive 1-2 finish at the track, and the team's fifth win at the track. The win was Hinchcliffe's third of the season, making him the first three-race winner of the season, and was also his first on an oval. Tony Kanaan finished third, Ed Carpenter and Graham Rahal finished fourth and fifth, respectively. Simon Pagenaud, Oriol Servia, Hélio Castroneves, Marco Andretti, and E. J. Viso closed out the top ten.

=== Race results ===
| Pos | No. | Driver | Team | Engine | Laps | Time/Retired | Pit Stops | Grid | Laps Led | Points^{1} |
|---|---|---|---|---|---|---|---|---|---|---|
| 1 | 27 | (Canada) James Hinchcliffe | Andretti Autosport | Chevrolet | 250 | 1:30:16.0266 | 3 | 2 | 226 | 60 |
| 2 | 1 | (United States) Ryan Hunter-Reay | Andretti Autosport | Chevrolet | 250 | + 1.5009 | 4 | 12 | | 40 |
| 3 | 11 | (Brazil) Tony Kanaan | KV Racing Technology | Chevrolet | 250 | + 1.6891 | 4 | 5 | | 38 |
| 4 | 20 | (United States) Ed Carpenter | Ed Carpenter Racing | Chevrolet | 250 | + 2.7605 | 4 | 4 | 18 | 37 |
| 5 | 15 | (United States) Graham Rahal | Rahal Letterman Lanigan Racing | Honda | 250 | + 3.0201 | 3 | 6 | 1 | 33 |
| 6 | 77 | (France) Simon Pagenaud | Schmidt Hamilton Motorsports | Honda | 250 | + 6.6654 | 3 | 8 | | 29 |
| 7 | 4 | (Spain) Oriol Servià | Panther Racing | Chevrolet | 250 | + 9.7006 | 3 | 7 | | 28 |
| 8 | 3 | (Brazil) Hélio Castroneves | Team Penske | Chevrolet | 250 | + 10.6855 | 3 | 11 | | 33 |
| 9 | 25 | (United States) Marco Andretti | Andretti Autosport | Chevrolet | 250 | + 12.7133 | 3 | 3 | | 28 |
| 10 | 5 | (Venezuela) E. J. Viso | Andretti Autosport | Chevrolet | 250 | + 17.6157 | 3 | 16 | | 20 |
| 11 | 19 | (United Kingdom) Justin Wilson | Dale Coyne Racing | Honda | 249 | + 1 lap | 4 | 10 | 5 | 20 |
| 12 | 83 | (United States) Charlie Kimball | Chip Ganassi Racing | Honda | 249 | + 1 lap | 4 | 14 | | 18 |
| 13 | 55 | (France) Tristan Vautier | Schmidt Peterson Motorsports | Honda | 248 | + 2 laps | 3 | 13 | | 17 |
| 14 | 7 | (France) Sebastian Bourdais | Dragon Racing | Chevrolet | 248 | + 2 laps | 3 | 19 | | 16 |
| 15 | 67 | (United States) Josef Newgarden | Sarah Fisher Hartman Racing | Honda | 248 | + 2 laps | 3 | 22 | | 15 |
| 16 | 9 | (New Zealand) Scott Dixon | Chip Ganassi Racing | Honda | 247 | + 3 laps | 3 | 15 | | 19 |
| 17 | 12 | (Australia) Will Power | Team Penske | Chevrolet | 247 | + 3 laps | 4 | 1 | | 21 |
| 18 | 16 | (United Kingdom) James Jakes | Rahal Letterman Lanigan Racing | Honda | 247 | + 3 laps | 4 | 24 | | 12 |
| 19 | 6 | (Colombia) Sebastián Saavedra | Dragon Racing | Chevrolet | 247 | + 3 laps | 4 | 18 | | 11 |
| 20 | 10 | (United Kingdom) Dario Franchitti | Chip Ganassi Racing | Honda | 246 | + 4 laps | 5 | 21 | | 10 |
| 21 | 78 | (Switzerland) Simona de Silvestro | KV Racing Technology | Chevrolet | 243 | + 7 laps | 5 | 20 | | 9 |
| 22 | 18 | (Brazil) Ana Beatriz | Dale Coyne Racing | Honda | 183 | Mechanical | 3 | 23 | | 8 |
| 23 | 14 | (Japan) Takuma Sato | A. J. Foyt Enterprises | Honda | 162 | Mechanical | 2 | 17 | | 10 |
| 24 | 98 | (Canada) Alex Tagliani | Barracuda Racing | Honda | 139 | Contact | 3 | 9 | | 7 |

Notes

^{1} Points include 1 point for leading at least 1 lap during a race, an additional 2 points for leading the most race laps, and 1 point for Pole Position.

| Previous race: 2013 Milwaukee IndyFest | IndyCar Series; 2013 season | Next race: 2013 Pocono IndyCar 400 |
| Previous race: 2012 Iowa Corn Indy 250 | Iowa Corn Indy 250 | Next race: 2014 Iowa Corn Indy 300 |
