= 2013 Grand Prix of Baltimore =

(United States) 2013 Grand Prix of Baltimore
Race details
- 16th round of the 2013 IndyCar Series season
- Date: September 1, 2013
- Official name: Grand Prix of Baltimore
- Location: Baltimore, Maryland
- Course: Temporary street circuit 2.040 mi / 3.283 km
- Distance: 75 laps 153.000 mi / 246.225 km
- Weather: Temperatures up to 91.9 °F (33.3 °C) with calm winds reported throughout the day

Pole position
- Driver: (New Zealand) Scott Dixon (Chip Ganassi Racing)
- Time: 1:18.0838

Podium
- First: (France) Simon Pagenaud (Sam Schmidt Motorsports)
- Second: (United States) Josef Newgarden (Sarah Fisher Hartman Racing)
- Third: (France) Sebastian Bourdais (Dragon Racing)

The 2013 Grand Prix of Baltimore, the third running of the event, was an IndyCar Series race held on September 1, 2013 on the streets of Baltimore, Maryland. The race was the sixteenth of the 2013 IndyCar Series season, and was the final running of the Grand Prix of Baltimore. Scott Dixon started on the pole position, while Simon Pagenaud of Sam Schmidt Motorsports won the race.

== Background ==
The previous race in the season, the GoPro Indy Grand Prix of Sonoma, was won by Will Power. The winner of the previous race was Ryan Hunter-Reay.

In the season, James Hinchcliffe and Scott Dixon were tied for the most wins with three. In the points race, Hélio Castroneves held the points lead with 479 points, followed by Dixon (440), Ryan Hunter-Reay (417), Marco Andretti (409), and Simon Pagenaud (380) rounded out the top five.

=== Qualifying ===
Scott Dixon won the pole position with a lap time of 1:18.0838 and lap speed of 94.053 miles per hour (151.364 km/h) for his second pole of the year, becoming 14th all-time among IndyCar Series drivers for career poles, passing Danny Sullivan and drawing with Gordon Johncock. Will Power (94.013 miles per hour (151.299 km/h)), Simon Pagenaud (93.637 miles per hour (150.694 km/h)), Justin Wilson (93.115 miles per hour (149.854 km/h)) and Josef Newgarden (93.077 miles per hour (149.793 km/h)) filled out the top five starting spots. Tristan Vautier (92.917 miles per hour (149.535 km/h)), Hélio Castroneves (92.928 miles per hour (149.553 km/h)), Ryan Hunter-Reay (92.919 miles per hour (149.539 km/h)), Charlie Kimball (92.901 miles per hour (149.510 km/h)), and Takuma Sato (92.702 miles per hour (149.189 km/h)) filled out the bottom half of the top ten.

== Race ==
The race was marred by six cautions, five of which took place between laps 41 and 65, the lone exception occurring on lap 13 with Ed Carpenter's car stopping in turn 5 and Luca Filippi leaving the track in turn 3 due to a fire in the engine compartment. On lap 41, Stefan Wilson hit the turn 7 wall, while seven laps later, Scott Dixon was spun by Graham Rahal in turn 1. Five laps later, Will Power collided with Dixon and was sent spinning into the wall, and four laps later, Oriol Servia and Sebastian Bourdais also touched, and the latter was turned. On lap 63, six cars were involved in an accident. Also during the race, Hélio Castroneves was black-flagged for a safety violation. Meanwhile, Simon Pagenaud was able to take the lead and hold off Josef Newgarden to win with a four-second advantage, his second victory of the year. Bourdais finished third, Justin Wilson and Simona de Silvestro closed out the top five; Charlie Kimball, James Hinchcliffe, Sebastián Saavedra, Castroneves and Marco Andretti rounded out the top ten.

After the race, Castroneves continued to lead the points standings with 501 points. Dixon was 49 points behind with 452, while Pagenaud took third with 431. Andretti and Ryan Hunter-Reay were in fourth and fifth with 430 and 427 points, respectively. Wilson (393), Dario Franchitti (388), Hinchcliffe (376), Will Power (371), and Kimball (363) finished the top ten in points.

== Classification ==
=== Race results ===
Position	Car Num.	Driver	Team	Engine	Laps	Running/Reason Out	Pts
1	77	(France) Simon Pagenaud	Schmidt Hamilton Motorsports	Honda	75	Running	51
2	67	(United States) Josef Newgarden	Sarah Fisher Hartman Racing	Honda	75	Running	40
3	7	(France) Sebastien Bourdais	Dragon Racing	Chevrolet	75	Running	36
4	19	(United Kingdom) Justin Wilson	Dale Coyne Racing	Honda	75	Running	32
5	78	(Switzerland) Simona De Silvestro	KV Racing Technology	Chevrolet	75	Running	30
6	83	(United States) Charlie Kimball	Chip Ganassi Racing	Honda	75	Running	28
7	27	(Canada) James Hinchcliffe	Andretti Autosport	Chevrolet	75	Running	26
8	6	(Colombia) Sebastian Saavedra	Dragon Racing	Chevrolet	75	Running	24
9	3	(Brazil) Helio Castroneves	Team Penske	Chevrolet	75	Running	22
10	25	(United States) Marco Andretti	Andretti Autosport	Chevrolet	75	Running	21
11	55	(France) Tristan Vautier (R)	Schmidt Peterson Motorsports	Honda	74	Running	20
12	4	(Spain) Oriol Servia	Panther Dreyer & Reinbold Racing	Chevrolet	74	Running	18
13	5	(Venezuela) E. J. Viso	Team Venezuela / Andretti Autosport / HVM	Chevrolet	74	Running	17
14	20	(United States) Ed Carpenter	Ed Carpenter Racing	Chevrolet	74	Running	16
15	11	(Brazil) Tony Kanaan	KV Racing Technology	Chevrolet	73	Contact	15
16	18	(United Kingdom) Stefan Wilson (R)	Dale Coyne Racing	Honda	72	Running	14
17	15	(United States) Graham Rahal	Rahal Letterman Lanigan Racing	Honda	68	Contact	14
18	12	(Australia) Will Power	Team Penske	Chevrolet	67	Running	15
19	9	(New Zealand) Scott Dixon	Chip Ganassi Racing	Honda	52	Contact	12
20	1	(United States) Ryan Hunter-Reay	Andretti Autosport	Chevrolet	42	Mechanical	10
21	10	(United Kingdom) Dario Franchitti	Chip Ganassi Racing	Honda	22	Mechanical	9
22	98	(Italy) Luca Filippi (R)	Barracuda Racing	Honda	12	Mechanical	8
23	16	(United Kingdom) James Jakes	Rahal Letterman Lanigan Racing	Honda	5	Mechanical	7
24	14	(Japan) Takuma Sato	A.J. Foyt Racing	Honda	4	Mechanical	6
OFFICIAL BOX SCORE

Previous race: 2013 GoPro Indy Grand Prix of Sonoma	IndyCar Series; 2013 season	Next race: 2013 Shell-Pennzoil Grand Prix of Houston
Previous race: 2012 Grand Prix of Baltimore	Grand Prix of Baltimore	Next race: Not held
