= 2014 Chevrolet Detroit Belle Isle Grand Prix =

(United States) 2014 Detroit Indy Grand Prix
Race details
- 6th and 7th round of the 2014 IndyCar Series season
- Date: May 31 and June 1, 2014
- Official name: Detroit Belle Isle Grand Prix
- Location: The Raceway on Belle Isle; Detroit, United States
- Course: Temporary street circuit 2.350 mi / 3.782 km
- Distance: 70 laps 164.500 mi / 264.737 km
Race 1

Pole position
- Driver: (Brazil) Hélio Castroneves (Team Penske)
- Time: 1:17.5362

Fastest lap
- Driver: (United Kingdom) Graham Rahal (Rahal Letterman Lanigan Racing)
- Time: 77.6399 (on lap 69 of 70)

Podium
- First: (Australia) Will Power (Team Penske)
- Second: (United States) Graham Rahal (Rahal Letterman Lanigan Racing)
- Third: (Brazil) Tony Kanaan (Chip Ganassi Racing)
Race 2

Pole position
- Driver: (Japan) Takuma Sato (A. J. Foyt Enterprises)
- Time: 1:16.1371

Fastest lap
- Driver: (New Zealand) Scott Dixon (Chip Ganassi Racing)
- Time: 76.9192 (on lap 58 of 70)

Podium
- First: (Brazil) Hélio Castroneves (Team Penske)
- Second: (Australia) Will Power (Team Penske)
- Third: (United States) Charlie Kimball (Chip Ganassi Racing)

The 2014 Chevrolet Indy Dual in Detroit was the first doubleheader of the 2014 IndyCar Series season, hosting Rounds 6 and 7 of the 2014 IndyCar Series season. Will Power won Race 1, and Hélio Castroneves won Race 2.

== Race 1 results ==
Pos	Driver	Team	Engine	Laps	Time/Retired	Pit Stops	Grid	Laps Led	Points^{1}
1	(Australia) Will Power	Team Penske	Chevrolet	70	1:49:29.9323; 90.138 mph	3	16	21	51
2	(United States) Graham Rahal	Rahal Letterman Lanigan Racing	Honda	70	+ 0.3308	3	9	10	41
3	(Brazil) Tony Kanaan	Chip Ganassi Racing	Chevrolet	70	+ 5.5096	3	8		35
4	(United Kingdom) Justin Wilson	Dale Coyne Racing	Honda	70	+ 8.5951	4	19		32
5	(Brazil) Hélio Castroneves	Team Penske	Chevrolet	70	+ 10.7365	2	1	30	34
6	(Canada) James Hinchcliffe	Andretti Autosport	Honda	70	+ 11.5074	2	2		28
7	(Colombia) Carlos Muñoz (R)	Andretti Autosport	Honda	70	+ 14.8813	3	11		26
8	(Colombia) Carlos Huertas (R)	Dale Coyne Racing	Honda	70	+ 26.5965	3	12		24
9	(United States) Charlie Kimball	Chip Ganassi Racing	Chevrolet	70	+ 32.5852	3	20		24
10	(United States) Marco Andretti	Andretti Autosport	Honda	70	+ 33.1818	3	18	1	21
11	(New Zealand) Scott Dixon	Chip Ganassi Racing	Chevrolet	70	+ 33.3522	3	10	1	20
12	(Colombia) Juan Pablo Montoya	Team Penske	Chevrolet	70	+ 34.0094	3	6		18
13	(France) Sébastien Bourdais	KV Racing Technology	Chevrolet	70	+ 36.0240	4	7		17
14	(Colombia) Sebastián Saavedra	KV Racing Technology	Chevrolet	70	+ 37.0532	3	13		16
15	(Australia) Ryan Briscoe	Chip Ganassi Racing	Chevrolet	70	+ 56.6632	3	5	5	16
16	(United States) Ryan Hunter-Reay	Andretti Autosport	Honda	69	+ 1 Lap	3	21		14
17	(Russia) Mikhail Aleshin (R)	Sam Schmidt Motorsports	Honda	68	+ 2 Laps	5	22	2	14
18	(Japan) Takuma Sato	A. J. Foyt Enterprises	Honda	66	+ 4 Laps	4	15		12
19	(United Kingdom) Jack Hawksworth (R)	Bryan Herta Autosport	Honda	65	+ 5 Laps	3	3		11
20	(United States) Josef Newgarden	Sarah Fisher Hartman Racing	Honda	36	Crash T7	1	14		10
21	(United Kingdom) Mike Conway	Ed Carpenter Racing	Chevrolet	14	Crash T12	0	4		9
22	(France) Simon Pagenaud	Sam Schmidt Motorsports	Honda	4	Crash T4	0	17		8

Notes

^{1} Points include 1 point for leading at least 1 lap during a race, an additional 2 points for leading the most race laps, and 1 point for Pole Position.

== Race 2 results ==
Pos	Driver	Team	Engine	Laps	Time/Retired	Pit Stops	Grid	Laps Led	Points^{1}
1	(Brazil) Hélio Castroneves	Team Penske	Chevrolet	70	1:45:53.3410	3	3	42	53
2	(Australia) Will Power	Team Penske	Chevrolet	70	+ 1.6836	4	8	2	41
3	(United States) Charlie Kimball	Chip Ganassi Racing	Chevrolet	70	+ 2.9746	3	20		35
4	(New Zealand) Scott Dixon	Chip Ganassi Racing	Chevrolet	70	+ 3.4290	3	22		32
5	(Canada) James Hinchcliffe	Andretti Autosport	Honda	70	+ 4.6528	2	2	10	32
6	(France) Simon Pagenaud	Sam Schmidt Motorsports	Honda	70	+ 4.9894	2	7		28
7	(Russia) Mikhail Aleshin (R)	Sam Schmidt Motorsports	Honda	70	+ 5.5279	3	16	1	27
8	(Colombia) Carlos Muñoz (R)	Andretti Autosport	Honda	70	+ 5.6906	2	6		24
9	(Brazil) Tony Kanaan	Chip Ganassi Racing	Chevrolet	70	+ 6.2501	3	17		22
10	(Australia) Ryan Briscoe	Chip Ganassi Racing	Chevrolet	70	+ 6.5923	3	5		20
11	(United Kingdom) Mike Conway	Ed Carpenter Racing	Chevrolet	70	+ 7.1114	3	4	4	20
12	(United Kingdom) Justin Wilson	Dale Coyne Racing	Honda	70	+ 7.2822	3	13		18
13	(Colombia) Juan Pablo Montoya	Team Penske	Chevrolet	70	+ 7.9649	3	15		17
14	(United Kingdom) Jack Hawksworth (R)	Bryan Herta Autosport	Honda	70	+ 8.7723	5	19	1	17
15	(Colombia) Carlos Huertas (R)	Dale Coyne Racing	Honda	70	+ 9.2906	2	12		15
16	(United States) Marco Andretti	Andretti Autosport	Honda	70	+ 27.2464	4	12		14
17	(United States) Josef Newgarden	Sarah Fisher Hartman Racing	Honda	69	+ 1 Lap	5	10		13
18	(Japan) Takuma Sato	A. J. Foyt Enterprises	Honda	69	+ 1 Lap	3	1	10	14
19	(United States) Ryan Hunter-Reay	Andretti Autosport	Honda	61	Electrical	4	21		11
20	(France) Sébastien Bourdais	KV Racing Technology	Chevrolet	58	Crash T5	3	11		10
21	(United States) Graham Rahal	Rahal Letterman Lanigan Racing	Honda	43	Crash Damage^{2}	2	14		9
22	(Colombia) Sebastián Saavedra	KV Racing Technology	Chevrolet	9	Crash T6	0	9		8

Notes

^{1} Points include 1 point for leading at least 1 lap during a race, an additional 2 points for leading the most race laps, and 1 point for Pole Position.

^{2} Graham Rahal was involved in a lap one crash but was able to continue until the damage became too bad to continue.

Previous race: 2014 Indianapolis 500	IndyCar Series; 2014 season	Next race: 2014 Firestone 600
Previous race: 2013 Chevrolet Detroit Belle Isle Grand Prix	Detroit Belle Isle Grand Prix	Next race: 2015 Chevrolet Detroit Belle Isle Grand Prix
