= 2013 Honda Indy Toronto =

2013 IndyCar Series race held at Toronto, Ontario, Canada

(Canada) 2013 Honda Indy Toronto - Race 1
Race details
- 12th round of the 2013 IndyCar Series season
- Date: July 13, 2013
- Official name: Honda Indy Toronto
- Location: Streets of Toronto
- Course: Temporary street circuit 1.755 mi / 2.824 km
- Distance: 85 laps 149.175 mi / 240.074 km
- Weather: Temperatures reaching up to 27.0 °C (80.6 °F) with negligible amounts of wind

Pole position
- Driver: (United Kingdom) Dario Franchitti (Chip Ganassi Racing)
- Time: 59.6756 (105.872 mph)

Fastest lap
- Driver: (Brazil) Hélio Castroneves (Team Penske)
- Time: 59.8267 sec (105.605 mph) (on lap 57 of 85)

Podium
- First: (New Zealand) Scott Dixon (Chip Ganassi Racing)
- Second: (France) Sébastien Bourdais (Dragon Racing)
- Third: (United Kingdom) Dario Franchitti (Chip Ganassi Racing)

(Canada) 2013 Honda Indy Toronto - Race 2
Race details
- 13th round of the 2013 IndyCar Series season
- Date: July 14, 2013
- Official name: Honda Indy Toronto
- Location: Streets of Toronto
- Course: Temporary street circuit 1.755 mi / 2.824 km
- Distance: 85 laps 149.175 mi / 240.074 km
- Weather: Temperatures reaching up to 29.0 °C (84.2 °F) with negligible amounts of wind

Pole position
- Driver: (New Zealand) Scott Dixon (Chip Ganassi Racing)
- Time: 58.9686 (107.142 mph)

Fastest lap
- Driver: (United Kingdom) Dario Franchitti (Chip Ganassi Racing)
- Time: 59.7982 sec (105.655 mph) (on lap 62 of 85)

Podium
- First: (New Zealand) Scott Dixon (Chip Ganassi Racing)
- Second: (Brazil) Hélio Castroneves (Team Penske)
- Third: (France) Sébastien Bourdais (Dragon Racing)

The 2013 Honda Indy Toronto was a Canadian open wheel motor race held as the twelfth and thirteenth rounds of the 2013 IndyCar Series season. It was the 27th Indy Toronto For the first time in its 28-year history it was held over two races instead of one. The races were contested over 85 laps each at the 1.755-mile (2.824 km) street course at Exhibition Place in Toronto, Ontario, Canada.

Both races were won by New Zealander Scott Dixon driving for the Chip Ganassi Racing team. By the end of the weekend Dixon had won three races consecutively, adding to his victory in the previous race, the Pocono IndyCar 400. Dixon had risen from fourth in the points to second, just 29 points behind Hélio Castroneves putting his charge towards his third Indycar championship back on track. Dragon Racing's Sébastien Bourdais had his best weekend of the season, finishing second on Saturday and third on Sunday behind Castroneves. Dixon's teammate Dario Franchitti followed immediate behind Bourdais in both races for a third and a fourth, scoring more points than Castroneves for the weekend.

The first race saw Dixon overhaul Bourdais late in the race to take the victory. The much hyped standing start was shifted from Race 1 to Race 2 after Josef Newgarden stalled on the grid for the Saturday race. Franchitti's third place was originally taken away when he was assigned a 25-second penalty for blocking Will Power's attempted overtake for third place on the final lap. Power hit the barriers and would be classified in 15th. The penalty was later rescinded. Early in the race Ryan Briscoe broke his wrist in an accident. Indly Lights driver Carlos Muñoz was drafted in to replace him on Sunday.

Dixon dominated the Sunday race, leading home Castroneves ahead of a battle between Bourdais, Franchitti, Power and Ryan Hunter-Reay that ended with a collision that eliminated Power, Hunter-Reay and Takuma Sato.

They were Dixon's first wins in Toronto and the fifth and sixth IndyCar victories in Toronto for Chip Ganassi Racing.

== Classification ==
=== Round 12 ===
Pos	No.	Driver	Team	Engine	Laps	Time/Retired	Grid	Laps Led	Points^{1}
Race 1 - July 13
1	9	(New Zealand) Scott Dixon	Chip Ganassi Racing	Honda	85	1:41:17.0605	5	14	51
2	7	(France) Sébastien Bourdais	Dragon Racing	Chevrolet	85	+ 1.7007s	2	20	41
3	10	(United Kingdom) Dario Franchitti	Chip Ganassi Racing	Honda	85	+ 2.9116s	1	20	37
4	26	(United States) Marco Andretti	Andretti Autosport	Chevrolet	85	+ 3.7273s	10	0	32
5	11	(Brazil) Tony Kanaan	KV Racing Technology	Chevrolet	85	+ 4.5961s	4	0	30
6	3	(Brazil) Hélio Castroneves	Team Penske	Chevrolet	85	+ 5.0720s	7	0	28
7	18	(United Kingdom) Mike Conway	Dale Coyne Racing	Honda	85	+ 5.5749s	20	0	26
8	27	(Canada) James Hinchcliffe	Andretti Autosport	Chevrolet	85	+ 8.6580s	13	0	24
9	77	(France) Simon Pagenaud	Schmidt Peterson Hamilton HP Motorsports	Honda	85	+ 10.2140s	12	0	22
10	78	(Switzerland) Simona de Silvestro	KV Racing Technology	Chevrolet	85	+ 10.8797s	22	0	20
11	19	(United Kingdom) Justin Wilson	Dale Coyne Racing	Honda	85	+ 11.3536s	8	0	19
12	16	(United Kingdom) James Jakes	Rahal Letterman Lanigan Racing	Honda	85	+ 11.6899s	15	0	18
13	20	(United States) Ed Carpenter	Ed Carpenter Racing	Chevrolet	85	+ 13.0557s	23	0	17
14	5	(Venezuela) E. J. Viso	Andretti Autosport	Chevrolet	85	+ 47.5037s	14	0	16
15	12	(Australia) Will Power	Team Penske	Chevrolet	84	Contact	3	29	18
16	6	(Colombia) Sebastián Saavedra	Dragon Racing	Chevrolet	84	+ 1 lap	24	0	14
17	98	(Canada) Alex Tagliani	Barracuda Racing – BHA	Honda	84	+ 1 lap	17	0	13
18	1	(United States) Ryan Hunter-Reay	Andretti Autosport	Chevrolet	83	+ 2 laps	6	0	12
19	55	(France) Tristan Vautier (R)	Schmidt Hamilton Motorsports	Honda	83	+ 2 laps	21	0	11
20	15	(United States) Graham Rahal	Rahal Letterman Lanigan Racing	Honda	82	+ 3 laps	18	0	10
21	83	(United States) Charlie Kimball	Chip Ganassi Racing	Honda	72	Contact	16	2	10
22	4	(Australia) Ryan Briscoe	Panther Racing	Chevrolet	64	Contact	9	0	8
23	67	(United States) Josef Newgarden	Sarah Fisher Hartman Racing	Honda	34	+ 51 laps	19	0	7
24	14	(Japan) Takuma Sato	A. J. Foyt Enterprises	Honda	32	Mechanical	11	0	6
OFFICIAL BOX SCORE

=== Round 13 ===
Pos	No.	Driver	Team	Engine	Laps	Time/Retired	Grid	Laps Led	Points^{1}
Race 2 - July 14
1	9	(New Zealand) Scott Dixon	Chip Ganassi Racing	Honda	85	1:35:02.3755	1	81	54
2	3	(Brazil) Hélio Castroneves	Team Penske	Chevrolet	85	+ 0.8772s	3	2	41
3	7	(France) Sébastien Bourdais	Dragon Racing	Chevrolet	85	+ 1.7213s	7	0	35
4	10	(United Kingdom) Dario Franchitti	Chip Ganassi Racing	Honda	85	+ 2.7630s	2	0	33
5	5	(Venezuela) E. J. Viso	Andretti Autosport	Chevrolet	85	+ 3.5804s	10	0	30
6	83	(United States) Charlie Kimball	Chip Ganassi Racing	Honda	85	+ 4.4245s	15	0	28
7	18	(United Kingdom) Mike Conway	Dale Coyne Racing	Honda	85	+ 5.0432s	23	0	26
8	19	(United Kingdom) Justin Wilson	Dale Coyne Racing	Honda	85	+ 5.4582s	13	0	24
9	26	(United States) Marco Andretti	Andretti Autosport	Chevrolet	85	+ 5.8601s	17	0	22
10	98	(Canada) Alex Tagliani	Barracuda Racing – BHA	Honda	85	+ 7.1766s	8	0	20
11	67	(United States) Josef Newgarden	Sarah Fisher Hartman Racing	Honda	85	+ 7.8430s	18	0	19
12	77	(France) Simon Pagenaud	Schmidt Peterson Hamilton HP Motorsports	Honda	85	+ 14.4211s	12	0	18
13	15	(United States) Graham Rahal	Rahal Letterman Lanigan Racing	Honda	84	+ 1 lap	19	0	17
14	78	(Switzerland) Simona de Silvestro	KV Racing Technology	Chevrolet	84	+ 1 lap	9	0	16
15	6	(Colombia) Sebastián Saavedra	Dragon Racing	Chevrolet	84	+ 1 lap	21	0	15
16	55	(France) Tristan Vautier (R)	Schmidt Hamilton Motorsports	Honda	84	+ 1 lap	16	0	14
17	4	(Colombia) Carlos Muñoz (R)	Panther Racing	Chevrolet	84	+ 1 lap	24	0	13
18	12	(Australia) Will Power	Team Penske	Chevrolet	83	Contact	5	2	13
19	1	(United States) Ryan Hunter-Reay	Andretti Autosport	Chevrolet	83	Contact	4	0	11
20	14	(Japan) Takuma Sato	A. J. Foyt Enterprises	Honda	83	Contact	14	0	10
21	27	(Canada) James Hinchcliffe	Andretti Autosport	Chevrolet	81	+ 4 laps	11	0	9
22	20	(United States) Ed Carpenter	Ed Carpenter Racing	Chevrolet	77	Contact	22	0	8
23	16	(United Kingdom) James Jakes	Rahal Letterman Lanigan Racing	Honda	62	Contact	20	0	7
24	11	(Brazil) Tony Kanaan	KV Racing Technology	Chevrolet	35	Contact	6	0	6
OFFICIAL BOX SCORE

Notes

^{1} Points include 1 point for pole position and 2 points for most laps led.

== Standings after the race ==
Drivers' Championship

Pos	Driver	Points
1	(Brazil) Hélio Castroneves	425
2	(New Zealand) Scott Dixon	396
3	(United States) Ryan Hunter-Reay	356
4	(United States) Marco Andretti	355
5	(France) Simon Pagenaud	309

- Note: Only the top five positions are included for the driver standings.

Previous race: 2013 Pocono IndyCar 400	IndyCar Series; 2013 season	Next race: 2013 Honda Indy 200 at Mid-Ohio
Previous race: 2012 Honda Indy Toronto	Honda Indy Toronto	Next race: 2014 Honda Indy Toronto
