= 2013 Honda Grand Prix of St. Petersburg =

(United States) 2013 St. Petersburg
Race details
- 1st round of the 2013 IndyCar Series season
- Date: March 24, 2013
- Official name: Honda Grand Prix of St. Petersburg
- Location: Streets of St. Petersburg
- Course: Temporary street circuit 1.800 mi / 2.897 km
- Distance: 110 laps 198.000 mi / 318.670 km
- Weather: 75 °F (24 °C), Overcast

Pole position
- Driver: (Australia) Will Power (Team Penske)
- Time: 1:01.2070

Fastest lap
- Driver: (Australia) Will Power (Team Penske)
- Time: 62.7279 (on lap 3 of 110)

Podium
- First: (Canada) James Hinchcliffe (Andretti Autosport)
- Second: (Brazil) Hélio Castroneves (Team Penske)
- Third: (United States) Marco Andretti (Andretti Autosport)

Chronology
Previous	Next
2012	2014

The 2013 Honda Grand Prix of St. Petersburg was the first race of the 2013 IndyCar Series season, with the race taking place on March 24 in St. Petersburg, Florida, on the city's temporary street course. The race was won by James Hinchcliffe, his first ever victory in the IndyCar Series, coming at his 33rd attempt.

== Report ==
=== Background ===
Ryan Hunter-Reay entered this race as the defending series champion, having clinched the title in the last race of the previous year, after title rival Will Power spun out early in the race while battling for track position with each other.

The relative lack of rookies for the 2013 season meant that Tristan Vautier and A. J. Allmendinger were the only newcomers onto the grid from last season for this race, with Allmendinger not officially being considered a true rookie by the IndyCar officials due to his previous drives in Champ Car, leaving Vautier the only full-time driver eligible for the Sunoco Rookie of the Year Award.

== Qualifying ==
Will Power once again proved his one-lap dominance on this circuit, taking his 4th consecutive St. Petersburg pole, going nearly 2 tenths of a second faster than his record pole attempt last year, and going fastest in each of the three Qualifying Rounds. Second to him was Japanese driver Takuma Sato, while Simona de Silvestro and James Hinchcliffe took the Second Row, and last year's race winner Hélio Castroneves and impressive rookie Tristan Vautier just behind them. Five different teams had drivers in the Firestone Fast Six, Team Penske being the only team with more than one representative, with both Power and Castroneves.

Further back, defending champ Ryan Hunter-Reay qualified 8th, missing out on qualifying for the Fast Six by less than a tenth of a second, while Chip Ganassi's Scott Dixon failed to progress from the first part of qualifying after his fast lap was disrupted by a piece of track signage left on the circuit from a previous incident.

== Race ==
Will Power drove away from the field at the green flag, pulling out a few car lengths lead over Takuma Sato before he even reached the first corner. Power went on to control the first part of the race. He held a 12-second advantage when the yellows came out on Lap 20, after Dario Franchitti was put out of the race by sliding into the wall just out of the pits on cold tyres.

This incident proved to be costly for Power, as upon the restart, Hélio Castroneves overtook him for the lead at the first corner. Meanwhile, a bunch-up in the midfield caused Ana Beatriz to turn Charlie Kimball's machine around near the back of the field, blocking the track for E. J. Viso, James Jakes and Sebastian Bourdais, Beatriz coming to a stop at the next corner as she'd stalled her car. J. R. Hildebrand also made contact with the wall at Turn 10, having been punted by Sebastián Saavedra, while Simon Pagenaud pulled into the pits to retire with a mechanical issue. Power lost another place to James Hinchcliffe upon the restart after this.

Ryan Hunter-Reay's race came to a stuttering end in the pit lane with throttle issues, while Beatriz and Josef Newgarden also suffered similar mechanical failures which forced them out the race, before Saavedra crashed out at Turn 10, bringing out the yellow's once again. It was behind the safety car that a bizarre crash happened, as Power, who was slowing down and speeding up his car to warm his tyres, was clattered into the back of by Hildebrand, who seemingly wasn't looking at the track when Power suddenly slowed until it was too late. Hildebrand's car rode over the top of Power's, coming to a halt in the wall, the suspension broken beyond repair and putting him out of the grand prix. Power's car was less severely damaged, but it also ruined his race, he was running 3rd at the time, and ended up finishing 16th after having to come into the pits to sort out a puncture caused by Hildebrand's car.

Hinchcliffe overtook Castroneves at the restart on Lap 85, after Castroneves made a mistake out of the first corner, which allowed the Canadian to settle into a lead that he never relinquished afterward. Following behind the two leaders was Simona de Silvestro, who had been putting in a very strong performance all weekend, and Scott Dixon, who had driven all way up from 20th to 4th at the restart. Castroneves pressured Hinchcliffe for the entirety of the 25 laps after the restart, but Hinch held on to take the top spot of the podium, Castroneves followed him home 2nd, while de Silvestro had 3rd cruelly snatched from her when she ran wide at the last corner of the penultimate lap, allowing Marco Andretti through to come home 3rd, leading home a tight pack, with just over 6 seconds separating him and Bourdais in 11th place.

Hinchcliffe dedicated his victory to the memory of Dan Wheldon, who had signed a deal to drive the Go Daddy car he was in on the morning of his death in the crash at Las Vegas.

== Classification ==
=== Qualifying ===
Pos	No	Name	Grp.	Round 1	Round 2	Round 3
1	12	(Australia) Will Power	2	1.01.4041	1.01.3034	1.01.2070
2	14	(Japan) Takuma Sato	2	1.01.4485	1.01.3989	1.01.5776
3	78	(Switzerland) Simona de Silvestro	2	1.01.8699	1.01.4017	1.01.7670
4	27	(Canada) James Hinchcliffe	1	1.01.7790	1.01.6343	1.01.8229
5	3	(Brazil) Hélio Castroneves	1	1.01.4041	1.01.4044	1.01.5127
6	55	(France) Tristan Vautier (R)	2	1.02.0138	1.01.6631	1.02.0645
7	25	(United States) Marco Andretti	2	1.02.1560	1.01.6883	
8	1	(United States) Ryan Hunter-Reay	1	1.01.8927	1.01.7339	
9	6	(Colombia) Sebastián Saavedra	1	1.01.7530	1.01.7944	
10	10	(United Kingdom) Dario Franchitti	2	1.01.9172	1.01.8150	
11	11	(Brazil) Tony Kanaan	2	1.01.7760	1.01.9139	
12	22	(Spain) Oriol Servià	1	1.01.9494	1.02.1483	
13	19	(United Kingdom) Justin Wilson	1	1.02.1777		
14	83	(United States) Charlie Kimball	2	1.02.1198		
15	15	(United States) Graham Rahal	1	1.02.2709		
16	67	(United States) Josef Newgarden	2	1.02.1592		
17	98	(Canada) Alex Tagliani	1	1.02.3328		
18	16	(United Kingdom) James Jakes	2	1.02.1658		
19	77	(France) Simon Pagenaud	1	1.02.4736		
20	9	(New Zealand) Scott Dixon	2	1.02.1715		
21	7	(France) Sebastian Bourdais	1	1.02.6537		
22	5	(Venezuela) E. J. Viso	2	1.02.1986		
23	20	(United States) Ed Carpenter	1	1.02.6634		
24	4	(United States) J. R. Hildebrand	2	1.02.3179		
25	18	(Brazil) Ana Beatriz	2	1.03.2551		

=== Starting grid ===
Row	Inside		Outside	
1	12	(Australia) Will Power	14	(Japan) Takuma Sato
2	78	(Switzerland) Simona de Silvestro	27	(Canada) James Hinchcliffe
3	3	(Brazil) Hélio Castroneves	55	(France) Tristan Vautier (R)
4	25	(United States) Marco Andretti	1	(United States) Ryan Hunter-Reay
5	6	(Colombia) Sebastián Saavedra	10	(United Kingdom) Dario Franchitti
6	11	(Brazil) Tony Kanaan	22	(Spain) Oriol Servià
7	19	(United Kingdom) Justin Wilson	83	(United States) Charlie Kimball
8	15	(United States) Graham Rahal	67	(United States) Josef Newgarden
9	98	(Canada) Alex Tagliani	16	(United Kingdom) James Jakes
10	77	(France) Simon Pagenaud	9	(New Zealand) Scott Dixon
11	7	(France) Sebastian Bourdais	5	(Venezuela) E. J. Viso
12	20	(United States) Ed Carpenter	4	(United States) J. R. Hildebrand
13	18	(Brazil) Ana Beatriz		

=== Race results ===
Pos	No.	Driver	Team	Engine	Laps	Time/Retired	Pit Stops	Grid	Laps Led	Points^{1}
1	27	(Canada) James Hinchcliffe	Andretti Autosport	Chevrolet	110	2:22:12:5502	3	4	26	51
2	3	(Brazil) Hélio Castroneves	Team Penske	Chevrolet	110	+ 1.0982	3	5	42	43
3	25	(United States) Marco Andretti	Andretti Autosport	Chevrolet	110	+ 16.3664	3	7		35
4	11	(Brazil) Tony Kanaan	KV Racing Technology	Chevrolet	110	+ 19.6083	3	11		32
5	9	(New Zealand) Scott Dixon	Chip Ganassi Racing	Honda	110	+ 20.7627	3	20		30
6	78	(Switzerland) Simona de Silvestro	KV Racing Technology	Chevrolet	110	+ 20.7890	3	3		28
7	5	(Venezuela) E. J. Viso	Andretti Autosport	Chevrolet	110	+ 20.8229	3	22		26
8	14	(Japan) Takuma Sato	A. J. Foyt Enterprises	Honda	110	+ 21.1878	5	2		24
9	19	(United Kingdom) Justin Wilson	Dale Coyne Racing	Honda	110	+ 21.6832	3	13		22
10	98	(Canada) Alex Tagliani	Barracuda Racing	Honda	110	+ 22.5569	3	17		20
11	7	(France) Sebastian Bourdais	Dragon Racing	Chevrolet	110	+ 22.7354	4	21		19
12	83	(United States) Charlie Kimball	Chip Ganassi Racing	Honda	110	+ 24.5429	6	14		18
13	15	(United States) Graham Rahal	Rahal Letterman Lanigan Racing	Honda	110	+ 37.5324	6	15		17
14	20	(United States) Ed Carpenter	Ed Carpenter Racing	Chevrolet	110	+ 45.2054	7	23		16
15	16	(United Kingdom) James Jakes	Rahal Letterman Lanigan Racing	Honda	110	+ 45.7793	6	18		15
16	12	(Australia) Will Power	Team Penske	Chevrolet	107	+ 3 laps	6	1	26	16
17	22	(Spain) Oriol Servià	Panther Dreyer & Reinbold Racing	Chevrolet	104	+ 6 laps	5	12	16	14
18	1	(United States) Ryan Hunter-Reay	Andretti Autosport	Chevrolet	79	Throttle	4	8		12
19	4	(United States) J. R. Hildebrand	Panther Racing	Chevrolet	78	Contact	4	24		11
20	6	(Colombia) Sebastián Saavedra	Dragon Racing	Chevrolet	72	Contact	3	9		10
21	55	(France) Tristan Vautier	Schmidt Peterson Motorsports	Honda	69	Mechanical	2	6		9
22	18	(Brazil) Ana Beatriz	Dale Coyne Racing	Honda	55	Throttle	5	25		8
23	67	(United States) Josef Newgarden	Sarah Fisher Hartman Racing	Honda	50	Throttle	2	16		7
24	77	(France) Simon Pagenaud	Schmidt Hamilton Motorsports	Honda	26	Mechanical	1	19		6
25	10	(United Kingdom) Dario Franchitti	Chip Ganassi Racing	Honda	18	Contact	1	10		5

Notes

^{1} Points include 1 point for leading at least 1 lap during a race, an additional 2 points for leading the most race laps, and 1 point for Pole Position.

== Championship standings after the race ==
Drivers' Championship standings

Pos	Driver	Points
1	(Canada) James Hinchcliffe	51
2	(Brazil) Hélio Castroneves	43
3	(United States) Marco Andretti	35
4	(Brazil) Tony Kanaan	32
5	(New Zealand) Scott Dixon	30

Previous race: None	IndyCar Series; 2013 season	Next race: 2013 Honda Indy Grand Prix of Alabama
Previous race: 2012 Honda Grand Prix of St. Petersburg	Honda Grand Prix of St. Petersburg	Next race: 2014 Firestone Grand Prix of St. Petersburg
