= 2013 Honda Indy Grand Prix of Alabama =

(United States) 2013 Alabama
Race details
- 2nd round of the 2013 IndyCar Series season
- Date: April 7, 2013
- Official name: Indy Grand Prix of Alabama
- Location: Barber Motorsports Park; Birmingham, Alabama
- Course: Road Course; 2.38 mi / 3.83 km
- Distance: 90 laps 214.2 mi / 344.7 km

Pole position
- Driver: (United States) Ryan Hunter-Reay (Andretti Autosport)
- Time: 1:07.0871

Podium
- First: (United States) Ryan Hunter-Reay (Andretti Autosport)
- Second: (New Zealand) Scott Dixon (Target Chip Ganassi Racing)
- Third: (Brazil) Hélio Castroneves (Team Penske)

The 2013 Indy Grand Prix of Alabama was the second race of the 2013 IndyCar Series season. The race was run on April 7, 2013 in Birmingham, Alabama, United States at Barber Motorsports Park. Ryan Hunter-Reay won the race.

== Report ==
=== Background ===
The first race of the 2013 IndyCar Series season in St. Petersburg, saw James Hinchcliffe earn his first career victory, holding off Hélio Castroneves in the closing laps. Expected championship contenders Dario Franchitti, Ryan Hunter-Reay and Will Power all experienced trouble during the race, finishing outside the top 15. A. J. Allmendinger made his return to IndyCar for this race, driving for Penske Racing.

=== Qualifying ===
Scott Dixon set a new track record in the first round of qualifying, but it was Ryan Hunter-Reay that would capture the pole in the Firestone Fast 6. While Takuma Sato had originally made the Fast Six, he was penalized for impeding Justin Wilson's qualifying lap, and Tristan Vautier was bumped into the Fast Six after initially missing the cut. Sato would lose his two fastest laps and fall to 12th starting position.

== Classification ==
=== Starting grid ===
| Row | Inside | | Outside | |
|---|---|---|---|---|
| 1 | 1 | (United States) Ryan Hunter-Reay | 12 | (Australia) Will Power |
| 2 | 55 | (France) Tristan Vautier (R) | 9 | (New Zealand) Scott Dixon |
| 3 | 83 | (United States) Charlie Kimball | 3 | (Brazil) Hélio Castroneves |
| 4 | 25 | (United States) Marco Andretti | 19 | (United Kingdom) Justin Wilson |
| 5 | 6 | (Colombia) Sebastián Saavedra | 2 | (United States) A. J. Allmendinger |
| 6 | 16 | (United Kingdom) James Jakes | 14 | (Japan) Takuma Sato |
| 7 | 77 | (France) Simon Pagenaud | 78 | (Switzerland) Simona de Silvestro |
| 8 | 98 | (Canada) Alex Tagliani | 5 | (Venezuela) E. J. Viso |
| 9 | 10 | (United Kingdom) Dario Franchitti | 22 | (Spain) Oriol Servià |
| 10 | 11 | (Brazil) Tony Kanaan | 27 | (Canada) James Hinchcliffe |
| 11 | 15 | (United States) Graham Rahal | 67 | (United States) Josef Newgarden |
| 12 | 7 | (France) Sébastien Bourdais | 4 | (United States) J. R. Hildebrand |
| 13 | 18 | (Brazil) Ana Beatriz | 20 | (United States) Ed Carpenter |

=== Race results ===
| Pos | No. | Driver | Team | Engine | Laps | Time/Retired | Pit Stops | Grid | Laps Led | Points^{1} |
|---|---|---|---|---|---|---|---|---|---|---|
| 1 | 1 | (United States) Ryan Hunter-Reay | Andretti Autosport | Chevrolet | 90 | 1:52:04.5450 | 3 | 1 | 53 | 54 |
| 2 | 9 | (New Zealand) Scott Dixon | Chip Ganassi Racing | Honda | 90 | + 0.6363 | 3 | 4 | | 40 |
| 3 | 3 | (Brazil) Hélio Castroneves | Team Penske | Chevrolet | 90 | + 17.6821 | 3 | 6 | 25 | 36 |
| 4 | 83 | (United States) Charlie Kimball | Chip Ganassi Racing | Honda | 90 | + 20.6160 | 3 | 5 | 3 | 33 |
| 5 | 12 | (Australia) Will Power | Team Penske | Chevrolet | 90 | + 26.6460 | 2 | 2 | 9 | 31 |
| 6 | 77 | (France) Simon Pagenaud | Schmidt Hamilton Motorsports | Honda | 90 | + 27.2995 | 3 | 13 | | 28 |
| 7 | 25 | (United States) Marco Andretti | Andretti Autosport | Chevrolet | 90 | + 27.7175 | 3 | 7 | | 26 |
| 8 | 19 | (United Kingdom) Justin Wilson | Dale Coyne Racing | Honda | 90 | + 30.5504 | 3 | 8 | | 24 |
| 9 | 67 | (United States) Josef Newgarden | Sarah Fisher Hartman Racing | Honda | 90 | + 41.1029 | 3 | 22 | | 22 |
| 10 | 55 | (France) Tristan Vautier | Schmidt Peterson Motorsports | Honda | 90 | + 50.6449 | 3 | 3 | | 20 |
| 11 | 98 | (Canada) Alex Tagliani | Barracuda Racing | Honda | 90 | + 58.0458 | 3 | 15 | | 19 |
| 12 | 5 | (Venezuela) E. J. Viso | Andretti Autosport | Chevrolet | 90 | + 1:01.4334 | 3 | 16 | | 18 |
| 13 | 11 | (Brazil) Tony Kanaan | KV Racing Technology | Chevrolet | 90 | + 1:01.6834 | 3 | 19 | | 17 |
| 14 | 14 | (Japan) Takuma Sato | A. J. Foyt Enterprises | Honda | 90 | + 1:03.1151 | 3 | 12 | | 16 |
| 15 | 22 | (Spain) Oriol Servià | Panther Dreyer & Reinbold Racing | Chevrolet | 90 | + 1:03.1495 | 4 | 18 | | 15 |
| 16 | 7 | (France) Sebastian Bourdais | Dragon Racing | Chevrolet | 90 | + 1:07.6880 | 3 | 23 | | 14 |
| 17 | 4 | (United States) J. R. Hildebrand | Panther Racing | Chevrolet | 90 | + 1:09.7447 | 3 | 18 | | 13 |
| 18 | 78 | (Switzerland) Simona de Silvestro | KV Racing Technology | Chevrolet | 90 | + 1:09.9130 | 3 | 14 | | 12 |
| 19 | 2 | (United States) A. J. Allmendinger | Team Penske | Chevrolet | 90 | + 1:11.0558 | 3 | 10 | | 11 |
| 20 | 6 | (Colombia) Sebastián Saavedra | Dragon Racing | Chevrolet | 90 | + 1:11.6523 | 3 | 9 | | 10 |
| 21 | 15 | (United States) Graham Rahal | Rahal Letterman Lanigan Racing | Honda | 90 | + 1:14.0385 | 5 | 21 | | 9 |
| 22 | 20 | (United States) Ed Carpenter | Ed Carpenter Racing | Chevrolet | 89 | + 1 lap | 4 | 26 | | 8 |
| 23 | 16 | (United Kingdom) James Jakes | Rahal Letterman Lanigan Racing | Honda | 86 | + 4 laps | 5 | 11 | | 7 |
| 24 | 18 | (Brazil) Ana Beatriz | Dale Coyne Racing | Honda | 65 | Mechanical | 4 | 25 | | 6 |
| 25 | 10 | (United Kingdom) Dario Franchitti | Chip Ganassi Racing | Honda | 42 | Mechanical | 1 | 17 | | 5 |
| 26 | 27 | (Canada) James Hinchcliffe | Andretti Autosport | Chevrolet | 3 | Contact | 0 | 20 | | 5 |

Notes

^{1} Points include 1 point for leading at least 1 lap during a race, an additional 2 points for leading the most race laps, and 1 point for Pole Position.

== Standings after the race ==
| | Pos. | Driver | Points |
|---|---|---|---|
| 1 | 1 | (Brazil) Hélio Castroneves | 79 |
| 3 | 2 | (New Zealand) Scott Dixon | 70 |
| 15 | 3 | (United States) Ryan Hunter-Reay | 66 |
| 1 | 4 | (United States) Marco Andretti | 61 |
| 4 | 5 | (Canada) James Hinchcliffe | 56 |
| 6 | 6 | (United States) Charlie Kimball | 51 |
| 3 | 7 | (Brazil) Tony Kanaan | 49 |
| 7 | 8 | (Australia) Will Power | 47 |
| | 9 | (United Kingdom) Justin Wilson | 46 |
| 3 | 10 | (Venezuela) E. J. Viso | 44 |

- Note: Only the top ten positions are included.

| Previous race: 2013 Honda Grand Prix of St. Petersburg | IZOD IndyCar Series; 2013 season | Next race: 2013 Toyota Grand Prix of Long Beach |
| Previous race: 2012 Indy Grand Prix of Alabama | Indy Grand Prix of Alabama | Next race: 2014 Indy Grand Prix of Alabama |
