= 2013 MAVTV 500 IndyCar World Championships =

(United States) 2013 MAVTV 500 IndyCar World Championships
Race details
- Race 19 of 19 in the 2013 IndyCar Series season
- Date: October 19, 2013
- Official name: MAVTV 500 IndyCar World Championships Presented By Lucas Oil
- Location: Auto Club Speedway, Fontana, California
- Course: Permanent racing facility 2.000 mi / 3.219 km
- Distance: 250 laps 500.000 mi / 804.672 km

Pole position
- Driver: (Australia) Will Power (Team Penske)
- Time: 220.775 mph (355.303 km/h)

Podium
- First: (Australia) Will Power (Team Penske)
- Second: (United States) Ed Carpenter (Ed Carpenter Racing)
- Third: (Brazil) Tony Kanaan (KV Racing Technology)

The 2013 MAVTV 500 IndyCar World Championships was the 19th and final race of the 2013 IndyCar Series season. The event took place on October 19, at the 2.000-mile (3.219 km) Auto Club Speedway in Fontana, California.

It was the final race for Izod as the series' main sponsor, as Verizon Communications took over as title sponsor from 2014.

This was the first race without Dario Franchitti In the field since the 2008 Peak Antifreeze Indy 300

== Report ==
Will Power, who won the pole position in qualifying, won the race leading 103 laps. Scott Dixon, who finished 5th, won the championship, defeating Hélio Castroneves by 27 points.

A. J. Allmendinger returned to Team Penske, driving the #2 car. J. R. Hildebrand drove the #98 Honda for Barracuda Racing. Will Power, from the pole, quickly lost the lead to a faster Sébastien Bourdais who dominated the first quarter of the race. Meanwhile, Castroneves rises from 10th to 5th place and watched the battle for the lead between Kanaan, Hunter-Reay, Bourdais and a fast Carlos Muñoz while Dixon keep the pace in 15th place.

At lap 111, Justin Wilson lost the rear of his car and was avoided by Josef Newgarden who collected Oriol Servià on the process. Then Wilson was hit by Tristan Vautier involving also James Jakes and Simona de Silvestro on the accident. Wilson was sent to the local hospital with minor fractures.

At the checkered flag Will Power finally grabbed the win at Fontana, followed by Ed Carpenter and Tony Kanaan. Dixon finished at 5th place, which was enough to give him the season title, while Castroneves had a tough night and finished 6th. Dixon become the new three time Indycar Series Champion, winning previously in 2003 and 2008.

== Top 10 results ==
Pos	No.	Driver	Team	Engine
1	12	(Australia) Will Power	Team Penske	Chevrolet
2	20	(United States) Ed Carpenter	Ed Carpenter Racing	Chevrolet
3	11	(Brazil) Tony Kanaan	KV Racing Technology	Chevrolet
4	27	(Canada) James Hinchcliffe	Andretti Autosport	Chevrolet
5	9	(New Zealand) Scott Dixon	Chip Ganassi Racing	Honda
6	3	(Brazil) Hélio Castroneves	Team Penske	Chevrolet
7	25	(United States) Marco Andretti	Andretti Autosport	Chevrolet
8	78	(Switzerland) Simona de Silvestro	KV Racing Technology	Chevrolet
9	1	(United States) Ryan Hunter-Reay	Andretti Autosport	Chevrolet
10	83	(United States) Charlie Kimball	Chip Ganassi Racing	Honda

== Points standings after the race ==
Pos	Driver	Points
1	(New Zealand) Scott Dixon	577
2	(Brazil) Hélio Castroneves	550
3	(France) Simon Pagenaud	508
4	(Australia) Will Power	498
5	(United States) Marco Andretti	484

Previous race: 2013 Shell-Pennzoil Grand Prix of Houston	IZOD IndyCar Series; 2013 season	Next race: None
Previous race: 2012 MAVTV 500 IndyCar World Championships	MAVTV 500	Next race: 2014 MAVTV 500 IndyCar World Championships
