= 2013 Firestone 550 =

(United States) 2013 Firestone 550
Race details
- 8th round of the 2013 IndyCar Series season
- Date: June 8, 2013
- Official name: Firestone 550
- Location: Texas Motor Speedway
- Course: Permanent racing facility 1.5 mi / 2.4 km
- Distance: 228 laps 342 mi / 550 km
- Weather: Temperatures reaching up to 90 °F (32 °C); wind speeds up to 14 miles per hour (23 km/h)

Pole position
- Driver: (Australia) Will Power (Team Penske)
- Time: 0:47.7960

Fastest lap
- Driver: (Brazil) Tony Kanaan (KV Racing Technology)
- Time: 24.2769 (on lap 51 of 228)

Podium
- First: (Brazil) Hélio Castroneves (Team Penske)
- Second: (United States) Ryan Hunter-Reay (Andretti Autosport)
- Third: (Brazil) Tony Kanaan (KV Racing Technology)

The 2013 Firestone 550 was twenty-third running of the Firestone 550 and the eighth round of the 2013 IndyCar Series season. It took place on Saturday, June 8. The race was contested over 228 laps at the 1.5-mile (2.4 km) Texas Motor Speedway in Fort Worth, Texas, and was televised by ABC in the United States.

== Report ==
=== Background ===
Before coming to Texas Motor Speedway, IndyCar completed the first doubleheader of the season at Belle Isle in the Chevrolet Indy Dual in Detroit, where Mike Conway earned his first victory of the season in the first race, while Simon Pagenaud won his first IndyCar series race in the second part of the doubleheader. Entering the Firestone 550, both Marco Andretti and Hélio Castroneves were tied atop the IndyCar drivers point championship, each with 206 point, though both did not have any victories on the season. Justin Wilson entered the race as the defending champion having won the previous year's race.

== Classification ==
=== Starting grid ===
Row	Inside		Outside	
1	12	(Australia) Will Power	25	(United States) Marco Andretti
2	1	(United States) Ryan Hunter-Reay	10	(United Kingdom) Dario Franchitti
3	5	(Venezuela) E. J. Viso	3	(Brazil) Hélio Castroneves
4	67	(United States) Josef Newgarden	83	(United States) Charlie Kimball
5	20	(United States) Ed Carpenter	16	(United Kingdom) James Jakes
6	9	(New Zealand) Scott Dixon	27	(Canada) James Hinchcliffe
7	11	(Brazil) Tony Kanaan	98	(Canada) Alex Tagliani
8	7	(France) Sébastien Bourdais	4	(Spain) Oriol Servia
9	15	(United States) Graham Rahal	6	(Colombia) Sebastián Saavedra
10	18	(United Kingdom) Pippa Mann	19	(United Kingdom) Justin Wilson
11	14	(Japan) Takuma Sato	78	(Switzerland) Simona de Silvestro ^{†}
12	77	(France) Simon Pagenaud ^{†}	55	(France) Tristan Vautier (R) ^{†}
^{†} de Silvestro, Pagenaud and Vautier penalised 10 places for changing engine

=== Race results ===
Pos	No.	Driver	Team	Engine	Laps	Time/Retired	Pit Stops	Grid	Laps Led	Points^{1}
1	3	(Brazil) Hélio Castroneves	Team Penske	Chevrolet	228	1:52:17.4594	3	6	132	53
2	1	(United States) Ryan Hunter-Reay	Andretti Autosport	Chevrolet	228	+ 4.6919	4	3	35	41
3	11	(Brazil) Tony Kanaan	KV Racing Technology	Chevrolet	228	+ 11.6088	4	13		35
4	20	(United States) Ed Carpenter	Ed Carpenter Racing	Chevrolet	228	+ 17.6930	4	9		32
5	25	(United States) Marco Andretti	Andretti Autosport	Chevrolet	228	+ 19.5078	4	2	57	31
6	10	(United Kingdom) Dario Franchitti	Chip Ganassi Racing	Honda	227	+ 1 lap	3	4		28
7	12	(Australia) Will Power	Team Penske	Chevrolet	227	+ 1 lap	3	1	4	28
8	67	(United States) Josef Newgarden	Sarah Fisher Hartman Racing	Honda	227	+ 1 lap	4	7		24
9	27	(Canada) James Hinchcliffe	Andretti Autosport	Chevrolet	227	+ 1 lap	4	12		22
10	5	(Venezuela) E. J. Viso	Andretti Autosport	Chevrolet	227	+ 1 lap	4	5		20
11	14	(Japan) Takuma Sato	A. J. Foyt Enterprises	Honda	227	+ 1 lap	4	21		19
12	16	(United Kingdom) James Jakes	Rahal Letterman Lanigan Racing	Honda	227	+ 1 lap	4	10		18
13	77	(France) Simon Pagenaud	Schmidt Hamilton Motorsports	Honda	226	+ 2 laps	5	23		17
14	6	(Colombia) Sebastián Saavedra	Dragon Racing	Chevrolet	226	+ 2 laps	5	18		16
15	19	(United Kingdom) Justin Wilson	Dale Coyne Racing	Honda	226	+ 2 laps	3	20		15
16	78	(Switzerland) Simona de Silvestro	KV Racing Technology	Chevrolet	226	+ 2 laps	4	22		14
17	83	(United States) Charlie Kimball	Chip Ganassi Racing	Honda	226	+ 2 laps	4	8		13
18	55	(France) Tristan Vautier	Schmidt Peterson Motorsports	Honda	225	+ 3 laps	3	24		12
19	4	(Spain) Oriol Servià	Panther Racing	Chevrolet	225	+ 3 laps	4	16		11
20	7	(France) Sebastian Bourdais	Dragon Racing	Chevrolet	224	+ 4 laps	5	15		10
21	15	(United States) Graham Rahal	Rahal Letterman Lanigan Racing	Honda	223	+ 5 laps	6	23		9
22	98	(Canada) Alex Tagliani	Barracuda Racing	Honda	223	+ 5 laps	6	14		8
23	9	(New Zealand) Scott Dixon	Chip Ganassi Racing	Honda	61	Mechanical	2	11		7
24	18	(United Kingdom) Pippa Mann	Dale Coyne Racing	Honda	2	Mechanical	0	19		6

Notes

^{1} Points include 1 point for leading at least 1 lap during a race, an additional 2 points for leading the most race laps, and 1 point for Pole Position.

Previous race: 2013 Chevrolet Detroit Belle Isle Grand Prix	IZOD IndyCar Series; 2013 season	Next race: 2013 Milwaukee IndyFest
Previous race: 2012 Firestone 550	Firestone 550	Next race: 2014 Firestone 600
