= 2013 Chevrolet Detroit Belle Isle Grand Prix =

(United States) 2013 Detroit Indy Grand Prix
Race details
- 6th and 7th round of the 2013 IndyCar Series season
- Date: June 1 and 2, 2013
- Official name: Detroit Belle Isle Grand Prix
- Location: The Raceway on Belle Isle; Detroit, United States
- Course: Temporary street circuit 2.350 mi / 3.782 km
- Distance: 70 laps 164.500 mi / 264.737 km
Race 1

Pole position
- Driver: (United Kingdom) Dario Franchitti (Chip Ganassi Racing)
- Time: 1:19.3311

Fastest lap
- Driver: (United Kingdom) Mike Conway (Dale Coyne Racing)
- Time: 77.8447 (on lap 47 of 70)

Podium
- First: (United Kingdom) Mike Conway (Dale Coyne Racing)
- Second: (United States) Ryan Hunter-Reay (Andretti Autosport)
- Third: (United Kingdom) Justin Wilson (Dale Coyne Racing)
Race 2

Pole position
- Driver: (United Kingdom) Mike Conway (Dale Coyne Racing)
- Time: 1:18.0977

Fastest lap
- Driver: (United Kingdom) Mike Conway (Dale Coyne Racing)
- Time: 77.4371 (on lap 47 of 70)

Podium
- First: (France) Simon Pagenaud (Schmidt Hamilton Motorsports)
- Second: (United Kingdom) James Jakes (Rahal Letterman Lanigan Racing)
- Third: (United Kingdom) Mike Conway (Dale Coyne Racing)

The 2013 Chevrolet Indy Dual in Detroit Presented By Quiken Loans was the first doubleheader in IndyCar Series history, hosting Rounds 6 and 7 of the 2013 IndyCar Series season. Mike Conway won Race 1, and Simon Pagenaud won Race 2.

== Race 1 ==
Dario Franchitti got the pole for race 1, but was given a grid penalty. E. J. Viso would start 1st. Mike Conway won.

Mike Conway started on pole for race 2, attempting to sweep the weekend, but he finished 3rd. Simon Pagenaud won Race 2.

Pos	No.	Driver	Team	Engine	Laps	Time/Retired	Pit Stops	Grid	Laps Led	Points^{1}
1	18	(United Kingdom) Mike Conway	Dale Coyne Racing	Honda	70	1:48:45.4309	2	2	47	53
2	1	(United States) Ryan Hunter-Reay	Andretti Autosport	Chevrolet	70	+ 12.9707	2	4	20	41
3	19	(United Kingdom) Justin Wilson	Dale Coyne Racing	Honda	70	+ 25.2606	2	16	3	36
4	9	(New Zealand) Scott Dixon	Chip Ganassi Racing	Honda	70	+ 25.3590	4	15		32
5	3	(Brazil) Hélio Castroneves	Team Penske	Chevrolet	70	+ 26.0549	2	12		30
6	10	(United Kingdom) Dario Franchitti	Chip Ganassi Racing	Honda	70	+ 26.4918	2	11		29
7	67	(United States) Josef Newgarden	Sarah Fisher Hartman Racing	Honda	70	+ 35.2019	4	24		26
8	12	(Australia) Will Power	Team Penske	Chevrolet	70	+ 40.8273	2	9		24
9	15	(United States) Graham Rahal	Rahal Letterman Lanigan Racing	Honda	70	+ 44.1836	3	23		22
10	16	(United Kingdom) James Jakes	Rahal Letterman Lanigan Racing	Honda	70	+ 47.3852	3	3		20
11	55	(France) Tristan Vautier	Schmidt Peterson Motorsports	Honda	70	+ 59.8249	4	6		19
12	77	(France) Simon Pagenaud	Schmidt Hamilton Motorsports	Honda	70	+ 1:02.8527	2	8		18
13	11	(Brazil) Tony Kanaan	KV Racing Technology	Chevrolet	70	+ 1:03.6549	2	19		17
14	83	(United States) Charlie Kimball	Chip Ganassi Racing	Honda	70	+ 1:03.9390	4	25		16
15	27	(Canada) James Hinchcliffe	Andretti Autosport	Chevrolet	70	+ 1:06.1779	3	20		15
16	78	(Switzerland) Simona de Silvestro	KV Racing Technology	Chevrolet	70	+ 1:07.2644	2	17		14
17	5	(Venezuela) E. J. Viso	Andretti Autosport	Chevrolet	70	+ 1:10.1976	5	1		13
18	20	(United States) Ed Carpenter	Ed Carpenter Racing	Chevrolet	69	+ 1 lap	4	22		12
19	14	(Japan) Takuma Sato	A. J. Foyt Enterprises	Honda	68	+ 2 laps	4	7		11
20	25	(United States) Marco Andretti	Andretti Autosport	Chevrolet	67	+ 3 laps	3	18		10
21	4	(Australia) Ryan Briscoe	Panther Racing	Chevrolet	66	Contact	2	21		9
22	6	(Colombia) Sebastián Saavedra	Dragon Racing	Chevrolet	32	Contact	1	10		8
23	98	(Canada) Alex Tagliani	Barracuda Racing	Honda	28	Contact	1	5		7
24	7	(France) Sebastian Bourdais	Dragon Racing	Chevrolet	28	Mechanical	1	14		6
25	2	(United States) A. J. Allmendinger	Team Penske	Chevrolet	0	Contact	0	13		5

Notes

^{1} Points include 1 point for leading at least 1 lap during a race, an additional 2 points for leading the most race laps, and 1 point for Pole Position.

== Race 2 ==
Pos	No.	Driver	Team	Engine	Laps	Time/Retired	Pit Stops	Grid	Laps Led	Points^{1}
1	77	(France) Simon Pagenaud	Schmidt Hamilton Motorsports	Honda	70	1:56:14.7861	3	6	18	51
2	16	(United Kingdom) James Jakes	Rahal Letterman Lanigan Racing	Honda	70	+ 5.6274	4	2	4	42
3	18	(United Kingdom) Mike Conway	Dale Coyne Racing	Honda	70	+ 6.0616	2	1	31	39
4	9	(New Zealand) Scott Dixon	Chip Ganassi Racing	Honda	70	+ 21.2953	2	7		32
5	10	(United Kingdom) Dario Franchitti	Chip Ganassi Racing	Honda	70	+ 23.4917	2	16		30
6	25	(United States) Marco Andretti	Andretti Autosport	Chevrolet	70	+ 29.0629	3	14		28
7	83	(United States) Charlie Kimball	Chip Ganassi Racing	Honda	70	+ 29.6681	2	18	3	27
8	3	(Brazil) Hélio Castroneves	Team Penske	Chevrolet	70	+ 37.6446	7	9		24
9	15	(United States) Graham Rahal	Rahal Letterman Lanigan Racing	Honda	70	+ 40.5396	5	15		22
10	6	(Colombia) Sebastián Saavedra	Dragon Racing	Chevrolet	70	+ 51.4543	4	11		20
11	7	(France) Sebastian Bourdais	Dragon Racing	Chevrolet	70	+ 1:13.1052	3	11		19
12	11	(Brazil) Tony Kanaan	KV Racing Technology	Chevrolet	70	+ 1:14.1353	3	19	10	19
13	4	(Australia) Ryan Briscoe	Panther Racing	Chevrolet	69	+ 1 lap	3	13		17
14	55	(France) Tristan Vautier	Schmidt Peterson Motorsports	Honda	69	+ 1 lap	3	20	1	17
15	20	(United States) Ed Carpenter	Ed Carpenter Racing	Chevrolet	66	+ 4 laps	6	23		15
16	67	(United States) Josef Newgarden	Sarah Fisher Hartman Racing	Honda	64	+ 6 laps	7	24		14
17	5	(Venezuela) E. J. Viso	Andretti Autosport	Chevrolet	61	+ 9 laps	5	5		13
18	1	(United States) Ryan Hunter-Reay	Andretti Autosport	Chevrolet	59	+ 11 laps	4	4		12
19	27	(Canada) James Hinchcliffe	Andretti Autosport	Chevrolet	57	+ 13 laps	5	10		11
20	12	(Australia) Will Power	Team Penske	Chevrolet	53	+ 17 laps	3	3	3	11
21	98	(Canada) Alex Tagliani	Barracuda Racing	Honda	27	Contact	3	25		9
22	19	(United Kingdom) Justin Wilson	Dale Coyne Racing	Honda	27	Contact	1	8		8
23	14	(Japan) Takuma Sato	A. J. Foyt Enterprises	Honda	23	Contact	1	21		7
24	78	(Switzerland) Simona de Silvestro	KV Racing Technology	Chevrolet	8	Contact	0	17		6
25	2	(United States) A. J. Allmendinger	Team Penske	Chevrolet	0	Contact	0	12		5

Notes

^{1} Points include 1 point for leading at least 1 lap during a race, an additional 2 points for leading the most race laps, and 1 point for Pole Position.

Previous race: 2013 Indianapolis 500	IndyCar Series; 2013 season	Next race: 2013 Firestone 550
Previous race: 2012 Chevrolet Detroit Belle Isle Grand Prix	Detroit Belle Isle Grand Prix	Next race: 2014 Chevrolet Detroit Belle Isle Grand Prix
