= 2013 GoPro Indy Grand Prix of Sonoma =

(United States) 2013 Indy Grand Prix of Sonoma
Race details
- 15th round of the 2013 IndyCar Series season
- Date: August 25, 2013
- Official name: GoPro Indy Grand Prix of Sonoma
- Location: Sonoma Raceway
- Course: Road course 2.303 mi / 3.706 km
- Distance: 85 laps 195.755 mi / 315.010 km

Pole position
- Driver: Dario Franchitti (Chip Ganassi Racing)
- Time: 1:17.5271

Podium
- First: Will Power (Team Penske)
- Second: Justin Wilson (Dale Coyne Racing)
- Third: Dario Franchitti (Chip Ganassi Racing)

The 2013 GoPro Indy Grand Prix of Sonoma was an IndyCar Series race held on August 25, 2013 at Sonoma Raceway in Sonoma, California. The race was the fifteenth of the 2013 IndyCar Series season, and was won by Will Power of Team Penske.

== Report ==
=== Background ===
The previous race of the season, the Honda Indy 200 at Mid-Ohio Sports Car Course, was won by Charlie Kimball. The 2012 edition of Sonoma race was won by Ryan Briscoe.

Entering the race, James Hinchcliffe and Scott Dixon were tied for the most wins with three. In the points race, Hélio Castroneves held the lead with 453 points, followed by Dixon (422), Ryan Hunter-Reay (388), Marco Andretti (377) and Simon Pagenaud (350) rounded out the top five.

=== Qualifying ===
Dario Franchitti won his 33rd career and final pole position, his fourth of 2013 and third at the track, with a lap time of 1:17.5271. Teammate Scott Dixon started second with a time of 1:17.7196, Team Penske teammates Will Power and Hélio Castroneves were in third and fourth, respectively. Ryan Hunter-Reay closed out the top five starting spots. Charlie Kimball, Justin Wilson, Graham Rahal, James Hinchcliffe and Simon Pagenaud rounded out the starting top ten. J. R. Hildebrand, making his return to IndyCar since the Indianapolis 500, started 18th, while Ryan Briscoe, running his final race of the season, started 22nd. Lucas Luhr started his IndyCar debut in 25th. The race was also Tony Kanaan's 311th, tying him with Jimmy Vasser for most consecutive IndyCar starts.

== Race ==
The race featured a track record seven cautions, four of which came in turn 7. Meanwhile, Scott Dixon and Will Power battled throughout the day, but during the final pit stops under caution, Dixon sped out of his pit box and struck Power's right rear tire carrier, sending the carrier into another pit member, while another was injured by an air gun. None of the three were seriously injured, and were treated with ice. As hitting pit crew members and pit equipment results in a penalty, Dixon fell back to 21st and finished 15th. The penalty became controversial after Dixon believed Power's crew member walked in front of Dixon's car intentionally. Dixon eventually called the ruling "pretty annoying"; IndyCar race director Beaux Barfield stated that replays Dixon hadn't seen of the incident showed him driving too close to Power's car, which was getting serviced at the time. As for Power, he led for the remainder of the race, and beat Justin Wilson by 1.2 seconds for his nineteenth career IndyCar victory and first in 25 races, while Dario Franchitti, Marco Andretti and Simon Pagenaud closed out the top five. The win was Power's third at Sonoma in four years, as he continues to be the only IndyCar driver with multiple wins at the track.

Sometime during the later portion of the race, Andretti made contact with Power, which led to a confrontation between Andretti and Power's car owner Roger Penske after the race.

The points standings featured Castroneves increasing his then 31-point lead over Dixon to a 39-point lead (479 points to 440), while Ryan Hunter-Reay (417), Marco Andretti (409), Simon Pagenaud (380) and Dario Franchitti (379) remained as the top six, Justin Wilson and Will Power leapt past James Hinchcliffe and Charlie Kimball for seventh and eight, respectively, dropping Hinchcliffe and Kimball to ninth and tenth.

Previous race: 2013 Honda Indy 200 at Mid-Ohio	IndyCar Series; 2013 season	Next race: 2013 Grand Prix of Baltimore
Previous race: 2012 GoPro Indy Grand Prix of Sonoma	GoPro Indy Grand Prix of Sonoma	Next race: 2014 GoPro Indy Grand Prix of Sonoma
