= 2013 Shell-Pennzoil Grand Prix of Houston =

(United States) 2013 Grand Prix of Houston
Race details
- 17th and 18th round of the 2013 IndyCar Series season
- Date: October 5 and 6, 2013
- Official name: Grand Prix of Houston
- Location: NRG Park, Houston, Texas, United States
- Course: Permanent racing facility 1.683 mi / 2.709 km
- Distance: 90 laps 151.47 mi / 243.767 km

Pole position
- Driver: Takuma Sato (A. J. Foyt Enterprises)
- Time: 97.305 mph

Podium
- First: Scott Dixon (Chip Ganassi Racing)
- Second: Simona de Silvestro (KV Racing Technology)
- Third: Justin Wilson (Dale Coyne Racing)

The 2013 Shell-Pennzoil Grand Prix of Houston was the third and final doubleheader of the 2013 IndyCar Series season. The races took place on October 5 and 6, 2013.

== Report ==
The starting scene of race 1 was a crash involving James Hinchcliffe and Ed Carpenter after Hinchcliffe's car suffered stall. The first race was won by Scott Dixon, who finished second to Team Penske driver Will Power in the second race. The second race was also notable for an accident on the final lap involving Dario Franchitti, E. J. Viso, and Takuma Sato. Franchitti suffered major injuries in the crash, and was forced to retire from racing due to the severity of the injuries he sustained.

Previous race: 2013 Grand Prix of Baltimore	IndyCar Series; 2013 season	Next race: 2013 MAVTV 500 IndyCar World Championships
Previous race: 2007 Grand Prix of Houston	Grand Prix of Houston	Next race: 2014 Grand Prix of Houston
