= 2013 Honda Indy 200 at Mid-Ohio =

(United States) 2013 Honda Indy 200
Race details
- 14th round of the 2013 IndyCar Series season
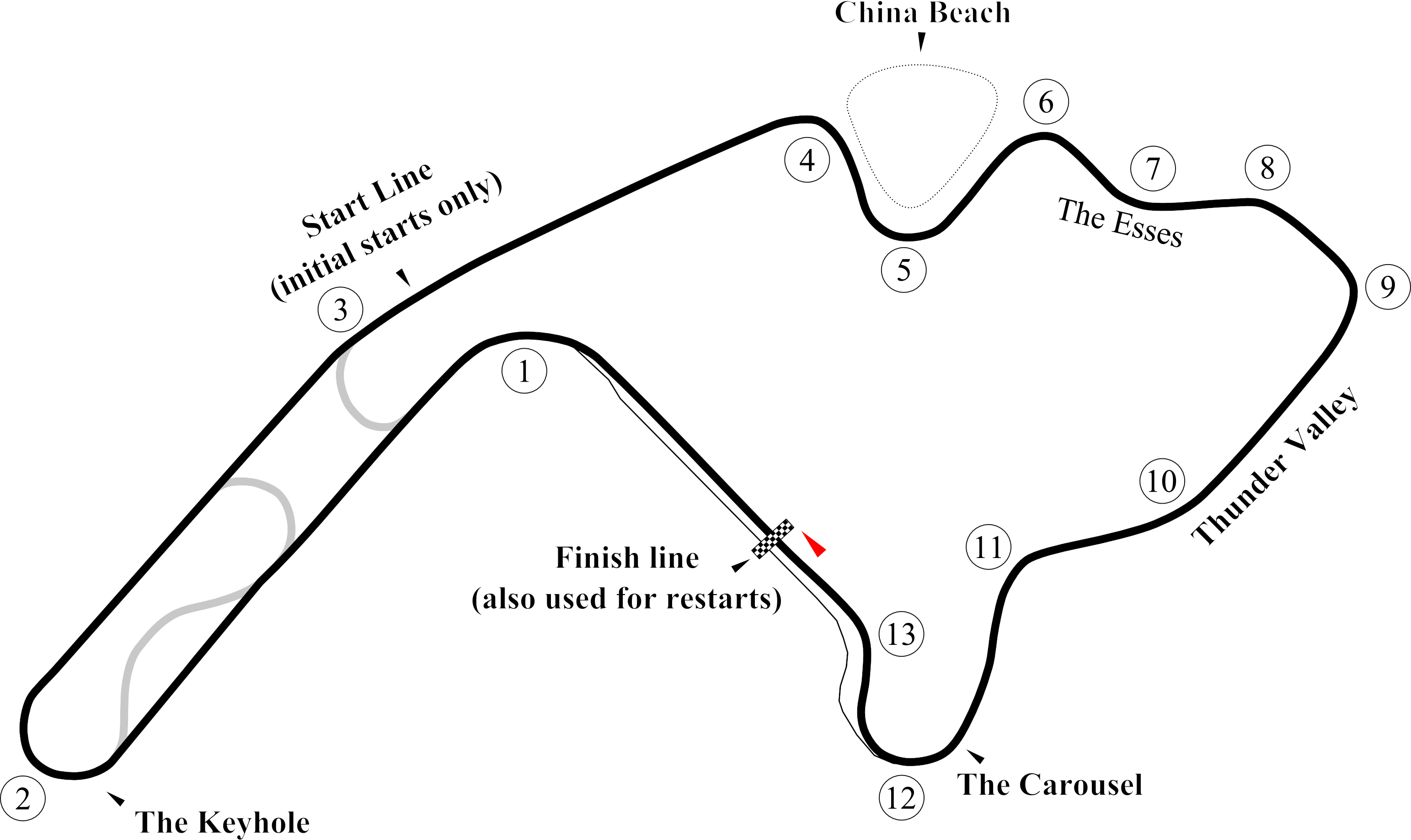
- Date: August 4, 2013
- Official name: Honda Indy 200
- Location: Mid-Ohio Sports Car Course
- Course: Permanent racing facility 2.258 mi / 3.634 km
- Distance: 90 laps 203.2 mi / 327.02 km
- Weather: Temperatures reaching up to 82 °F (28 °C); wind speeds reaching up to 12 miles per hour (19 km/h)

Pole position
- Driver: (United States) Ryan Hunter-Reay (Andretti Autosport)
- Time: 1:05.3519

Podium
- First: (United States) Charlie Kimball (Chip Ganassi Racing)
- Second: (France) Simon Pagenaud (Schmidt Hamilton Motorsports)
- Third: (Scotland) Dario Franchitti (Chip Ganassi Racing)

The 2013 Honda Indy 200 at Mid-Ohio, the 35th running of the event, was an IndyCar Series race held at the Mid-Ohio Sports Car Course on August 4, 2013. It was the 14th race in the 2013 IndyCar Series season. The pole position was held by Ryan Hunter-Reay of Andretti Autosport, while Chip Ganassi Racing's Charlie Kimball won the race.

== Report ==
=== Background ===
The race was the seventh running since it became a part of the IndyCar schedule, and was dominated by Chip Ganassi Racing, with Scott Dixon winning four times and teammate Dario Franchitti winning once in 2010. The lone non-Ganassi win was by Team Penske's Ryan Briscoe in 2008. IndyCar extended the race by five laps to 90 laps to prevent the race from not having much competition and being determined by the driver who can manage their fuel mileage the best.

The past three races at Pocono and Toronto had been dominated by Dixon, with the Toronto sweep making him the winningest active driver in IndyCar with 32 wins, tied with Franchitti, Paul Tracy and Sébastien Bourdais. The three consecutive wins placed Dixon in contention for the championship, 29 points behind leader Hélio Castroneves. Chip Ganassi Racing's three wins in 2013 are second to Andretti Autosport's five victories, with James Hinchcliffe winning three and Ryan Hunter-Reay winning two. Takuma Sato (A. J. Foyt Enterprises), Tony Kanaan (KV Racing Technology), Mike Conway (Dale Coyne Racing), Simon Pagenaud (Sam Schmidt Motorsports) and Helio Castroneves (Team Penske) won the other five races.

=== Qualifying ===
Ryan Hunter-Reay of Andretti Autosport won the pole with a lap speed of 1:05.3519, barely missing the record set by Dario Franchitti and Gil de Ferran in 1999 and 2000, respectively, falling .0049 seconds short. Hunter-Reay stated that the reason he fell short of the record was because he was not driving through turn 13 cleanly. Will Power was .1840 behind Hunter-Reay, and Scott Dixon started third. Marco Andretti (1:05.8566), Charlie Kimball (1:06.4638), Dario Franchitti (1:07.1793), Justin Wilson (1:05.9405), Simon Pagenaud (1:05.9412), Simona de Silvestro (1:05.9621) and James Jakes (1:06.1778) rounded out the top ten starting grid.

== Race ==
During the race, much of the race leaders conserved fuel, attempting to finish the race with only two pit stops. Charlie Kimball, who was running a backup car due to wrecking his primary car in practice, had three stops, and led a race-high 46 laps; Kimball had led only 15 laps in his IndyCar career prior. Kimball competed with Simon Pagenaud for much of the race, and while attempting to pass Pagenaud, who was exiting pit road, Kimball's right tires slid into the grass, but eventually made the pass after three corners with 18 laps to go while heading into turn 5. Kimball held off Pagenaud for his first career IndyCar Series win by a margin of 5.5 seconds; it was his first win in any racing series since 2006, when he won a Formula 3 Euro Series race. Kimball became the first driver with diabetes to win an IndyCar race. Dario Franchitti, Will Power and Ryan Hunter-Reay closed out the top five, while Hélio Castroneves, Scott Dixon, Justin Wilson, Marco Andretti and James Hinchcliffe rounded out the top ten.

For the second year in a row, the race ran in its entirety without a caution period.

Previous race: 2013 Honda Indy Toronto	IndyCar Series; 2013 season	Next race: 2013 GoPro Indy Grand Prix of Sonoma
Previous race: 2012 Honda Indy 200 at Mid-Ohio	Honda Indy 200	Next race: 2014 Honda Indy 200 at Mid-Ohio
