= 2013 Milwaukee IndyFest =

(United States) 2013 Milwaukee IndyFest
Race details
- 9th round of the 2013 IndyCar Series season
- Date: June 15, 2013
- Official name: Milwaukee IndyFest
- Location: Milwaukee Mile
- Course: Permanent racing facility 1.015 mi / 1.633 km
- Distance: 225 laps 228.38 mi / 367.542 km
- Weather: Temperatures reaching up to 73.4 °F (23.0 °C); wind speeds approaching 8 miles per hour (13 km/h)

Pole position
- Driver: (United States) Marco Andretti (Andretti Autosport)

Podium
- First: (United States) Ryan Hunter-Reay (Andretti Autosport)
- Second: (Brazil) Hélio Castroneves (Team Penske)
- Third: (Australia) Will Power (Team Penske)

Chronology
Previous	Next
2012	2014

The 2013 Milwaukee IndyFest was an IndyCar Series race held on June 15, 2013 at the Milwaukee Mile in West Allis, Wisconsin. The race was the ninth in the 2013 IndyCar Series season, and was won by Ryan Hunter-Reay of Andretti Autosport.

== Report ==
=== Background ===
Andretti Autosport had the most victories heading into the Milwaukee race, with James Hinchcliffe and Ryan Hunter-Reay winning two and one race, respectively. The defending race winner was Hunter-Reay.

=== Qualifying ===
Marco Andretti of Andretti Autosport clinched the pole position with a speed of 170.515 mph (274.417 km/h). His teammate James Hinchcliffe started second, Will Power started third, Ryan Hunter-Reay and E. J. Viso started fourth and fifth, respectively. Sebastián Saavedra started a career-high sixth, with Tony Kanaan, Josef Newgarden, Simon Pagenaud and Tristan Vautier rounded out the top ten.

== Race ==
In the race, Takuma Sato dominated, leading a race-high 109 laps, until he drifted into turn 4 and nearly hit the wall; Sato then pitted under green, but Ana Beatriz's contact brought out the caution, bringing Sato down a lap, and he was eventually passed by Ryan Hunter-Reay on lap 198. Hunter-Reay led the remaining 53 laps and won by 4.809 seconds over Hélio Castroneves to claim his second straight victory at the track, becoming the first back-to-back race winner at Milwaukee since Tony Kanaan in 2006-07. The win was Andretti Autosport's 47th in the IndyCar Series, and fifth at Milwaukee. Will Power finished third, behind by 5.39 seconds, for his first podium of the season, followed by E. J. Viso, his best finish of the year, and Hunter-Reay's teammate James Hinchcliffe closed out the top five. Pole-sitter Marco Andretti had his car stall when leaving the pits on lap 97 and stop on the backstretch with an electrical problem, and finished 20th. Scott Dixon, Sato, Dario Franchitti, Justin Wilson, and Kanaan finished the top ten.

=== Race results ===
Pos	No.	Driver	Team	Engine	Laps	Time/Retired	Pit Stops	Grid	Laps Led	Points^{1}
1	1	(United States) Ryan Hunter-Reay	Andretti Autosport	Chevrolet	250	1:51:15.2962	4	4	65	51
2	3	(Brazil) Hélio Castroneves	Team Penske	Chevrolet	250	+ 4.8059	4	17		40
3	12	(Australia) Will Power	Team Penske	Chevrolet	250	+ 5.3920	4	3	4	36
4	5	(Venezuela) E. J. Viso	Andretti Autosport	Chevrolet	250	+ 6.2511	4	5	10	33
5	27	(Canada) James Hinchcliffe	Andretti Autosport	Chevrolet	250	+ 6.4632	4	2		30
6	9	(New Zealand) Scott Dixon	Chip Ganassi Racing	Honda	250	+ 16.5292	4	11		28
7	14	(Japan) Takuma Sato	A. J. Foyt Enterprises	Honda	250	+ 23.3828	4	15	109	29
8	10	(United Kingdom) Dario Franchitti	Chip Ganassi Racing	Honda	250	+ 23.8041	5	23		24
9	19	(United Kingdom) Justin Wilson	Dale Coyne Racing	Honda	249	+ 1 lap	4	13	1	23
10	11	(Brazil) Tony Kanaan	KV Racing Technology	Chevrolet	249	+ 1 lap	4	7		20
11	67	(United States) Josef Newgarden	Sarah Fisher Hartman Racing	Honda	249	+ 1 lap	4	8		19
12	77	(France) Simon Pagenaud	Schmidt Hamilton Motorsports	Honda	249	+ 1 lap	4	9		18
13	6	(Colombia) Sebastián Saavedra	Dragon Racing	Chevrolet	248	+ 2 laps	5	6		17
14	20	(United States) Ed Carpenter	Ed Carpenter Racing	Chevrolet	248	+ 2 laps	4	20		16
15	4	(Australia) Ryan Briscoe	Panther Racing	Chevrolet	248	+ 2 laps	4	18		15
16	15	(United States) Graham Rahal	Rahal Letterman Lanigan Racing	Honda	247	+ 3 laps	6	24		14
17	83	(United States) Charlie Kimball	Chip Ganassi Racing	Honda	246	+ 4 laps	5	21		13
18	16	(United Kingdom) James Jakes	Rahal Letterman Lanigan Racing	Honda	245	+ 5 laps	6	12		12
19	18	(Brazil) Ana Beatriz	Dale Coyne Racing	Honda	242	+ 8 laps	4	19		11
20	25	(United States) Marco Andretti	Andretti Autosport	Chevrolet	176	Mechanical	6	1	61	12
21	55	(France) Tristan Vautier	Schmidt Peterson Motorsports	Honda	173	Mechanical	4	10		9
22	7	(France) Sebastian Bourdais	Dragon Racing	Chevrolet	152	Mechanical	4	14		8
23	98	(Canada) Alex Tagliani	Barracuda Racing	Honda	146	Mechanical	4	16		7
24	78	(Switzerland) Simona de Silvestro	KV Racing Technology	Chevrolet	69	Contact	2	22		6

Notes

^{1} Points include 1 point for leading at least 1 lap during a race, an additional 2 points for leading the most race laps, and 1 point for Pole Position.

Previous race: 2013 Firestone 550	IndyCar Series; 2013 season	Next race: 2013 Iowa Corn Indy 250
Previous race: 2012 Milwaukee IndyFest	IndyCar Series at the Milwaukee Mile	Next race: 2014 ABC Supply Wisconsin 250
