= 2014 Iowa Corn Indy 300 =

(United States) 2014 Iowa Corn Indy 300
Race details
- 12th round of the 2014 IndyCar Series season
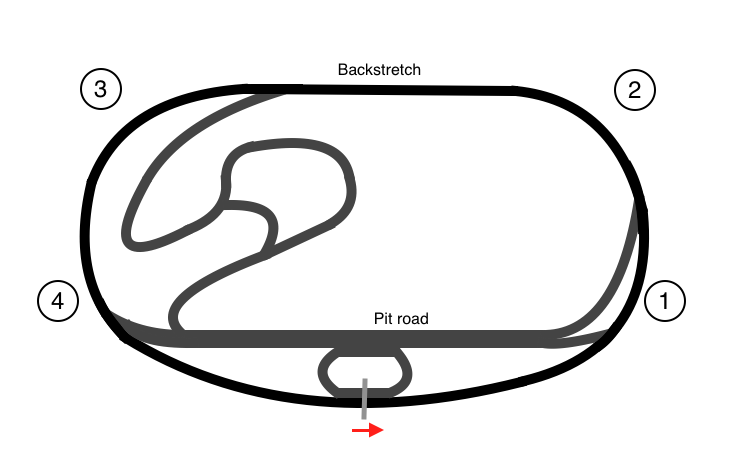
- Date: July 12, 2014
- Official name: Iowa Corn Indy 300
- Location: Iowa Speedway
- Course: Permanent racing facility 0.894 mi / 1.439 km
- Distance: 300 laps 268.200 mi / 431.626 km

Pole position
- Driver: (New Zealand) Scott Dixon (Chip Ganassi Racing)
- Time: 17.2662 + 17.2926 = 34.5588

Fastest lap
- Driver: (United States) Josef Newgarden (Sarah Fisher Hartman Racing)
- Time: 17.8771 (on lap 298 of 300)

Podium
- First: (United States) Ryan Hunter-Reay (Andretti Autosport)
- Second: (United States) Josef Newgarden (Sarah Fisher Hartman Racing)
- Third: (Brazil) Tony Kanaan (Chip Ganassi Racing)

The 2014 Iowa Corn Indy 300 was the 12th round of the 2014 IndyCar Series season. Scott Dixon scored his first pole of the season.

== Report ==
=== Background ===
Iowa Speedway is the shortest track on the IndyCar schedule, being 0.894 miles (1.439 km) long. The previous race at Pocono was won by Juan Pablo Montoya who won his first race since his comeback. Montoya had scored his last IndyCar win in 2000 at Gateway.

Previous race: 2014 Pocono IndyCar 500	Verizon IndyCar Series; 2014 season	Next race: 2014 Honda Indy Toronto
Previous race: 2013 Iowa Corn Indy 250	Iowa Corn Indy 300	Next race: 2015 Iowa Corn Indy 300
