= Mikhail Aleshin =

Russian racing driver

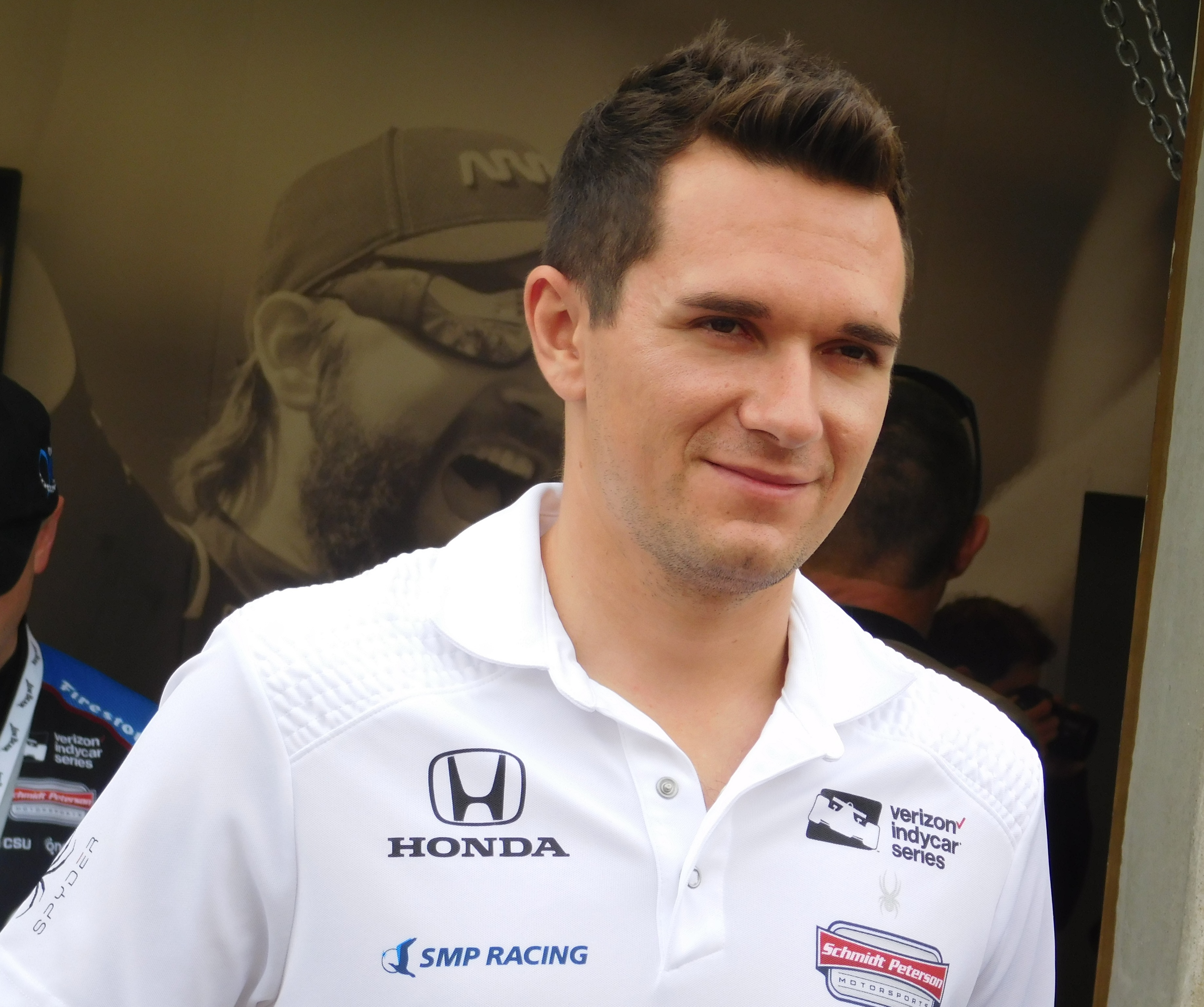
- Aleshin in 2017
- Nationality: (Russia) Russian
- Born: Mikhail Petrovich Aleshin; 22 May 1987 (age 39) Moscow, Russian SFSR, Soviet Union
- Categorisation: FIA Platinum

IndyCar Series career
- 38 races run over 4 years
- Team: No. 7 (Schmidt Peterson Motorsports)
- 2017 position: 19th
- Best finish: 15th (2016)
- First race: 2014 Firestone Grand Prix of St. Petersburg (St. Petersburg)
- Last race: 2017 Honda Indy 200 (Mid-Ohio)
Wins	Podiums	Poles
0	2	1

Previous series
- 2015 2010–13 2011 2009 2007, 11 2006–08 2005–06 2004 2003–05 2003–05 2002: European Le Mans Series; Formula Renault 3.5 Series; GP2 Asia Series; FIA Formula Two; GP2 Series; Formula Renault 3.5 Series; A1 Grand Prix; FR 2.0 Italy Winter series Formula Renault 2.0 Germany; Eurocup Formula Renault 2.0; Russian Formula Three

Championship titles
- 2010 2004: Formula Renault 3.5 Series; FR 2.0 Italy Winter series

Mikhail Petrovich Aleshin (Russian: Михаи́л Петро́вич Алёшин, IPA: [mʲɪxɐˈil pʲɪˈtrovʲɪtɕ ɐˈlʲɵʂɨn], born 22 May 1987) is a Russian professional racing driver and the 2010 champion of the Formula Renault 3.5 Series.

== Career ==
Aleshin competed in karting from 1996 to 2000. Since 2001, he has taken part in various international open wheel series. On 14 April 2007, he became the first Russian driver to win a major international single-seater race when he won the opening round of the Formula Renault 3.5 Series season at Monza. He then deputised for the injured Michael Ammermüller in the ART Grand Prix team at the second round of the 2007 GP2 Series season, becoming the second Russian after Vitaly Petrov to race in the series. He remained in FR3.5 for 2008, taking his best finish in the championship so far despite not winning a race.

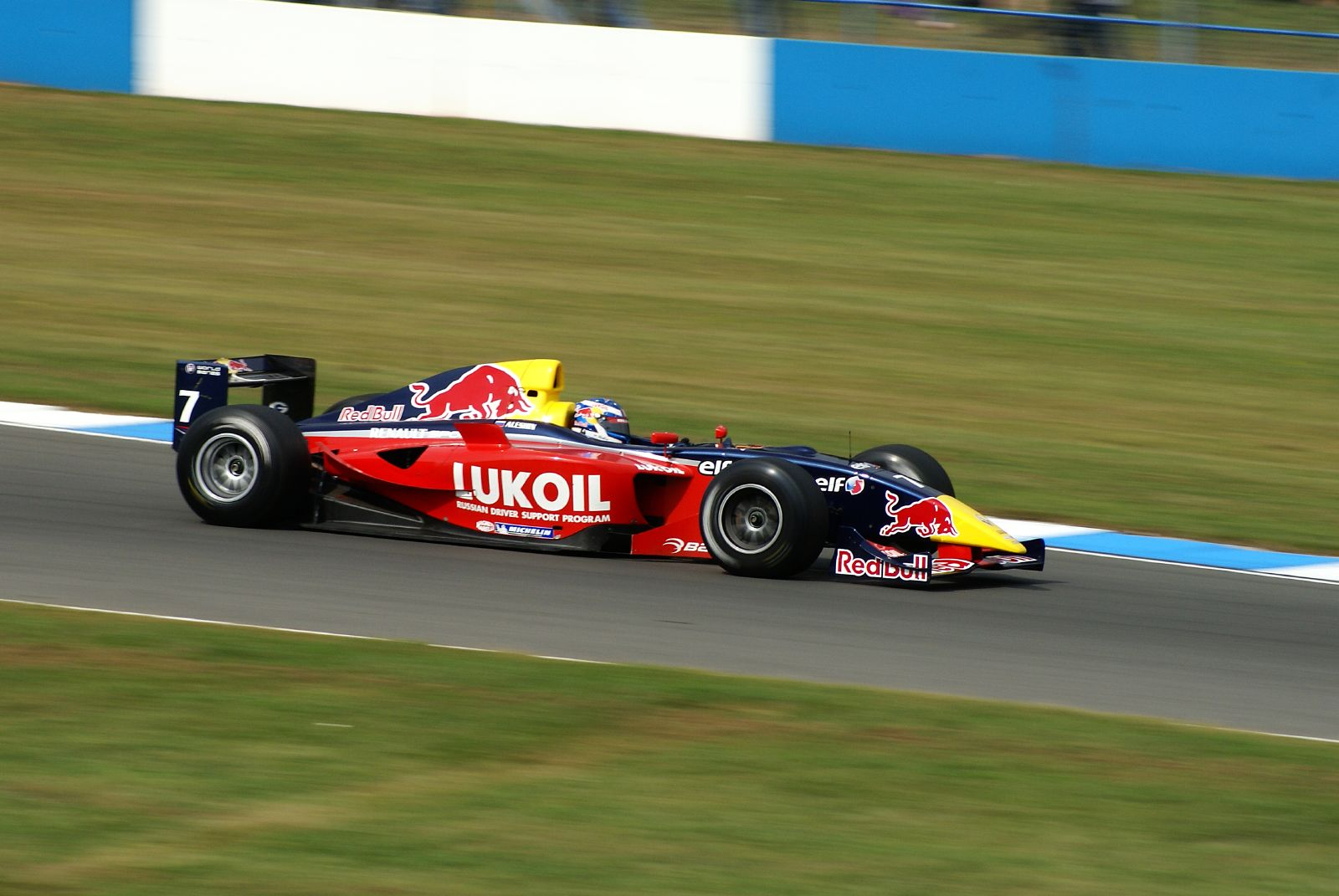
Aleshin driving for Carlin Motorsport at the Donington Park round of the 2007 Formula Renault 3.5 Series season

Aleshin joined the relaunched FIA Formula Two Championship for 2009, driving car number 15. He finished third in the championship, with a single win coming at Oschersleben.

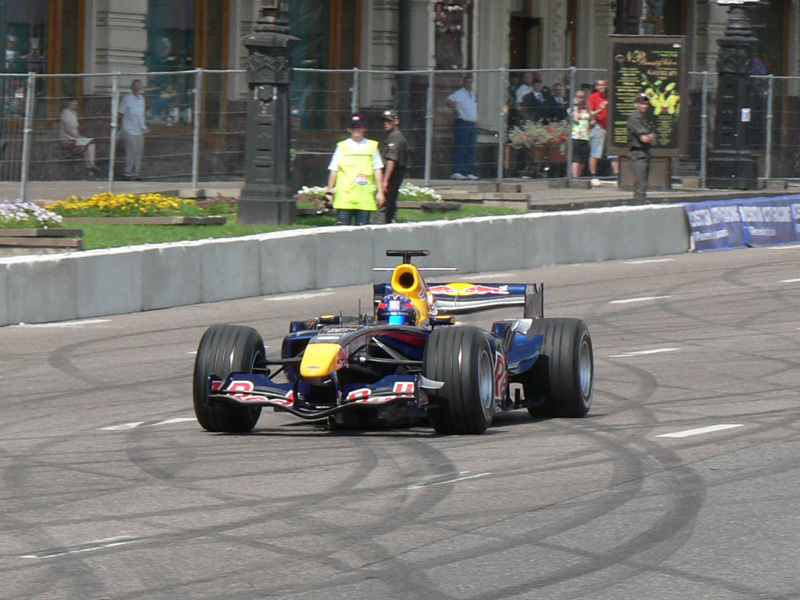
Aleshin driving a Red Bull RB2 at Moscow City Racing show (2008)

Aleshin returned to Formula Renault 3.5 for the 2010 season, partnering Jake Rosenzweig at Carlin. Scoring three victories, he became the champion of the series. He tested for Renault F1 in the young drivers' test in Abu Dhabi and stated that he was confident for a Formula One drive in 2011, but did not obtain one.

Aleshin remained with Carlin to drive in 2011 GP2 Series and 2011 GP2 Asia Series, the team's first season in the category and Aleshin's first attempt at the series since 2007. He was partnered by Max Chilton, another driver who had previously been employed by Carlin in lower formulae. He endured a frustrating Asia series, afflicted by technical problems which left him last in the drivers' championship, before announcing that he did not have a budget to compete in the main series, and would henceforth be stepping back to the ATS Formel 3 Cup. He then, however, secured a last-minute temporary GP2 deal with Carlin, only to crash in qualifying for the first round of the season in Turkey, injuring metacarpals in both hands which prevented him from racing. He returned to action for the following round of the championship at Catalunya, but was then replaced by Oliver Turvey as his money ran out. After eight races on the sidelines, he returned to racing action with Carlin at the Hungaroring. He was replaced again by Parente for the season finale at Monza, and finished 32nd and last in the overall standings.

In 2014, Aleshin began racing in the IndyCar Series with Schmidt Peterson Motorsports.

=== Fontana crash ===
At Fontana in the final race of the 2014 IndyCar season, Aleshin was practicing his race-car before the race. He was in Turn 4 of the two-mile Fontana track—a track where the cars travel at more than 200 mph—when the accident occurred.

Aleshin's No. 7 car was driving low on the track before clipping the apron at the bottom, this unsettled the car and subsequently sent it into a spin. Charlie Kimball, who was running the high line, had no time to react to Aleshin's car that was sliding up the track before him and he slammed into Aleshin at almost full speed. The impact sent both cars into the outside retaining wall where the upwards momentum of Aleshin's out of control car caused it to vault up and over Kimball and the nose speared through the catch fencing, causing it to pirouette against the fence. Aleshin's car then fell back onto the track as pieces of the car were scattered for yards and a large section of the catch fencing was ripped down. Kimball was able to get out of his car on his own, however, Aleshin was rushed to the hospital in critical condition.

"The 7 car spun from the bottom and I really had nowhere to go," said Kimball, who was not hurt. Aleshin, meanwhile, was diagnosed with a concussion, fractured ribs, a broken right clavicle and chest injuries.

== Motorsports career results ==
=== Career summary ===
Season	Series	Team	Races	Wins	Poles	F/Laps	Podiums	Points	Position
2002	Russian Formula 3 Championship	Lukoil Racing F3	4	0	0	?	1	40	4th
2003	Formula Renault 2000 Germany	JD Motorsport	14	0	0	0	0	99	12th
2003	Formula Renault 2000 Masters	JD Motorsport	8	0	0	0	0	0	NC
2004	Formula Renault 2000 Germany	Lukoil Racing Team	14	0	2	1	3	185	5th
2004	Formula Renault 2000 Eurocup	Lukoil Racing Team	16	0	0	0	0	26	17th
2005	Eurocup Formula Renault 2.0	Lukoil Racing Team	10	0	0	0	0	3	30th
2005	Formula Renault 2.0 Germany	Lukoil Racing Team	16	1	1	1	7	274	**2nd**
2005–06	A1 Grand Prix	A1 Team Russia	2	0	0	0	0	0	25th
2006	Formula Renault 3.5 Series	Carlin Motorsport	17	0	1	0	2	41	11th
2007	Formula Renault 3.5 Series	Carlin Motorsport	17	1	1	0	1	44	13th
2007	GP2 Series	ART Grand Prix	4	0	0	0	0	3	25th
2008	Formula Renault 3.5 Series	Carlin Motorsport	16	0	0	0	3	73	5th
2009	FIA Formula Two Championship	Motorsport Vision	16	1	1	0	5	59	**3rd**
2010	Formula Renault 3.5 Series	Carlin	17	3	1	2	8	138	**1st**
2010	GP3 Series	Carlin	2	0	0	0	0	0	NC
2010	German Formula 3 Trophy	Stromos ArtLine	2	2	2	2	2	N/A	NC†
2010	Formula One	Renault F1 Team	Test driver						
2011	GP2 Series	Carlin	8	0	0	0	0	0	32nd
2011	GP2 Asia Series	Carlin	4	0	0	0	0	0	27th
2011	German Formula 3 Championship	Stromos ArtLine	8	0	0	0	0	3	18th
2011	German Formula 3 Trophy	Stromos ArtLine	8	7	8	8	7	70	**3rd**
2011	Superleague Formula	Russia	3	0	0	0	1	56	12th
2011	Formula Renault 3.5 Series	KMP Racing	2	0	0	0	0	4	28th
2012	Formula Renault 3.5 Series	Team RFR	17	0	1	1	1	46	13th
2013	Formula Renault 3.5 Series	Tech 1 Racing	17	0	0	0	0	33	12th
2013	Blancpain Endurance Series - Pro	SMP Racing	4	0	0	0	1	7	29th
2014	IndyCar Series	Schmidt Peterson Hamilton Motorsports	18	0	0	0	1	372	17th
2015	European Le Mans Series - LMP2	AF Corse	1	0	0	0	0	56	5th
2015	European Le Mans Series - LMP2	AF Racing	2	0	0	0	2	56	5th
2015	European Le Mans Series - LMP2	SMP Racing	2	0	0	0	1	56	5th
2015	24 Hours of Le Mans - LMP2	SMP Racing	1	0	0	0	0	N/A	13th
2015	IndyCar Series	Schmidt Peterson Motorsports	1	0	0	0	0	40	33rd
2016	IndyCar Series	Schmidt Peterson Motorsports	16	0	1	0	1	347	15th
2016	FIA World Endurance Championship - LMP2	SMP Racing	4	0	0	0	0	34	16th
2016	24 Hours of Le Mans - LMP2	SMP Racing	1	0	0	0	0	N/A	7th
2017	IndyCar Series	Schmidt Peterson Motorsports	12	0	0	0	0	237	19th
2017	24 Hours of Le Mans - LMP2	SMP Racing	1	0	0	0	0	N/A	16th
2018	Blancpain GT Series Endurance Cup	SMP Racing	5	0	1	1	1	23	20th
2018	24 Hours of Le Mans	SMP Racing	1	0	0	0	0	N/A	DNF
2018-19	FIA World Endurance Championship	SMP Racing	8	0	0	0	4	94	4th
2019	Blancpain GT Series Endurance Cup	SMP Racing	5	1	0	0	2	73	**2nd**
2019	24 Hours of Le Mans	SMP Racing	1	0	0	0	1	N/A	**3rd**
2019	Intercontinental GT Challenge	SMP Racing	1	0	0	0	0	0	NC
2025	Gulf 12 Hours	Capital RT by Motopark	1	1	0	0	1	N/A	**1st**
2026	Russian Circuit Racing Series - GT4	CapitalRT							

^{†} As Aleshin was a guest driver, he was ineligible for championship points.

=== Complete Formula Renault 2.0 Germany results ===
(key) (Races in bold indicate pole position; races in italics indicate fastest lap)

Year	Entrant	1	2	3	4	5	6	7	8	9	10	11	12	13	14	15	16	DC	Points
2003	JD Motorsport	OSC; 1; 15	OSC; 2; 7	HOC; 1; 13	HOC; 2; 9	NÜR; 1; 17	NÜR; 2; 18	SAL; 1; 17	SAL; 2; 14	A1R; 1; 10	A1R; 2; 14	OSC; 1; 15	OSC; 2; 23	LAU; 1; 10	LAU; 2; 15			12th	99
2004	Lukoil Racing Team	**OSC**; **1**; 3	OSC; 2; 15	ASS; 1; 12	ASS; 2; 7	SAL; 1; 4	SAL; 2; 5	SAC; 1; 17	**SAC**; **2**; 2	NÜR; 1; 10	NÜR; 2; 2	LAU; 1 Ret	LAU; 2; 6	OSC; 1; 6	OSC; 2; 13			5th	185
2005	Lukoil Racing Team	**OSC**; **1**; 1	OSC; 2; 6	HOC; 1; 2	HOC; 2; 2	SAC; 1; 14	SAC; 2; 4	ASS; 1; 2	ASS; 2; 6	NÜR; 1; 5	NÜR; 2; 6	OSC; 1; 2	OSC; 2; 3	LAU; 1; 2	LAU; 2; 15	OSC; 1; 5	OSC; 2; 11	2nd	274

=== Complete Formula Renault 2.0 Eurocup results ===
(key) (Races in bold indicate pole position; races in italics indicate fastest lap)

Year	Entrant	1	2	3	4	5	6	7	8	9	10	11	12	13	14	15	16	17	DC	Points
2003	JD Motorsport	BRN; 1; 27	BRN; 2; 11	ASS; 1 Ret	ASS; 2 Ret	OSC; 1; 21	OSC; 2; 16	DON; 1; 22	DON; 2; 14										29th	0
2004	Lukoil Racing Team	MNZ; 1; 9	MNZ; 2 Ret	VAL; 1; 20	VAL; 2; 17	MAG; 1; 20	MAG; 2; 25	HOC; 1; 12	HOC; 2; 22	BRN; 1; 9	BRN; 2; 10	DON; 1 DSQ	DON; 2; 6	SPA; 14	IMO; 1; 12	IMO; 2 Ret	OSC; 1; 11	OSC; 2; 15	16th	28
2005	Lukoil Racing Team	ZOL; 1; 12	ZOL; 2; 11	VAL; 1; 18	VAL; 2; 19	LMS; 1	LMS; 2	BIL; 1 DNS	BIL; 2 DNS	OSC; 1 Ret	OSC; 2; 14	DON; 1; 9	DON; 2 Ret	EST; 1 Ret	EST; 2; 26	MNZ; 1	MNZ; 2		30th	3

=== Complete A1 Grand Prix results ===
(key)

Year	Entrant	1	2	3	4	5	6	7	8	9	10	11	12	13	14	15	16	17	18	19	20	21	22	DC	Points
2005–06	Russia	GBR; SPR	GBR; FEA	GER; SPR	GER; FEA	POR; SPR; 15	POR; FEA; 17	AUS; SPR	AUS; FEA	MYS; SPR	MYS; FEA	UAE; SPR	UAE; FEA	RSA; SPR	RSA; FEA	IDN; SPR	IDN; FEA	MEX; SPR	MEX; FEA	USA; SPR	USA; FEA	CHN; SPR	CHN; FEA	25th	0

=== Complete Formula Renault 3.5 Series results ===
(key) (Races in bold indicate pole position) (Races in italics indicate fastest lap)

Formula Renault 3.5 results
Year	Team	1	2	3	4	5	6	7	8	9	10	11	12	13	14	15	16	17	Pos	Points
2006	Carlin Motorsport	ZOL; 1; 13	ZOL; 2 Ret	MON; 1; 15	IST; 1; 23	IST; 2; 2	MIS; 1; 7	MIS; 2; 16	SPA; 1 Ret	SPA; 2; 6	**NÜR**; **1**; 3	NÜR; 2; 21	DON; 1; 7	DON; 2; 9	LMS; 1; 19	LMS; 2 Ret	CAT; 1; 8	CAT; 2; 13	12th	41
2007	Carlin Motorsport	**MNZ**; **1**; 1	MNZ; 2; 19	NÜR; 1 Ret	NÜR; 2; 15	MON; 1; 7	HUN; 1; 9	HUN; 2; 20	SPA; 1 Ret	SPA; 2; 7	DON; 1; 9	DON; 2 Ret	MAG; 1 Ret	MAG; 2; 10	EST; 1 Ret	EST; 2; 14	CAT; 1; 5	CAT; 2; 13	12th	44
2008	Carlin Motorsport	MNZ; 1; 5	MNZ; 2; 5	SPA; 1; 5	SPA; 2; 3	MON; 1; 6	SIL; 1 Ret	SIL; 2; 18	HUN; 1; 9	HUN; 2; 15	NÜR; 1; 3	NÜR; 2 DNS	BUG; 1; 6	BUG; 2; 4	EST; 1; 9	EST; 2; 23	CAT; 1; 2	CAT; 2; 14	5th	73
2010	Carlin Motorsport	ALC; 1; 1	ALC; 2; 11	**SPA**; **1**; 1	SPA; 2; 4	MON; 1; 2	BRN; 1 Ret	BRN; 2; 9	MAG; 1; 1	MAG; 2; 4	HUN; 1; 2	HUN; 2; 3	HOC; 1; 5	HOC; 2; 4	SIL; 1; 6	SIL; 2; 11	CAT; 1; 2	CAT; 2; 3	**1st**	**138**
2011	KMP Racing	ALC; 1	ALC; 2	SPA; 1	SPA; 2	MNZ; 1	MNZ; 2	MON; 1	NÜR; 1	NÜR; 2	HUN; 1; 11	HUN; 2; 8	SIL; 1	SIL; 2	LEC; 1	LEC; 2	CAT; 1	CAT; 2	28th	4
2012	Team RFR	ALC; 1 Ret	ALC; 2; 11	MON; 1; 8	SPA; 1; 4	SPA; 2 Ret	NÜR; 1; 13	NÜR; 2; 6	MSC; 1; 14	MSC; 2; 9	SIL; 1; 11†	SIL; 2; 17†	HUN; 1 Ret	HUN; 2; 19	LEC; 1; 12	LEC; 2; 17	CAT; 1; 9	**CAT**; **2**; 2	13th	46
2013	Tech 1 Racing	MNZ; 1; 15	MNZ; 2; 14	ALC; 1; 10	ALC; 2; 11	MON; 1; 8	SPA; 1; 14	SPA; 2 Ret	MSC; 1; 16	MSC; 2; 5	RBR; 1 Ret	RBR; 2; 18	HUN; 1; 5	HUN; 2; 13	LEC; 1; 17†	LEC; 2; 6	CAT; 1 Ret	CAT; 2; 14	12th	33

=== Complete GP2 Series results ===
(key) (Races in bold indicate pole position) (Races in italics indicate fastest lap)

GP2 Series results
Year	Entrant	1	2	3	4	5	6	7	8	9	10	11	12	13	14	15	16	17	18	19	20	21	DC	Points
2007	ART Grand Prix	BHR; FEA	BHR; SPR	CAT; FEA; 6	CAT; SPR; Ret	MON; FEA	MAG; FEA	MAG; SPR	SIL; FEA	SIL; SPR	NÜR; FEA	NÜR; SPR	HUN; FEA	HUN; SPR	IST; FEA	IST; SPR	MNZ; FEA	MNZ; SPR	SPA; FEA	SPA; SPR	VAL; FEA; 9	VAL; SPR; 20	25th	3
2011	Carlin	IST; FEA; DNS	IST; SPR; DNS	CAT; FEA; 16	CAT; SPR; 18	MON; FEA	MON; SPR	VAL; FEA	VAL; SPR	SIL; FEA	SIL; SPR	NÜR; FEA	NÜR; SPR	HUN; FEA; 15	HUN; SPR; 15	SPA; FEA; Ret	SPA; SPR; Ret	MNZ; FEA	MNZ; SPR				32nd	0

==== Complete GP2 Asia Series results ====
(key) (Races in bold indicate pole position) (Races in italics indicate fastest lap)

GP2 Asia Series results
Year	Entrant	1	2	3	4	DC	Points
2011	Carlin	YMC; FEA; Ret	YMC; SPR; 24	IMO; FEA; 20	IMO; SPR; 20	27th	0

=== Complete FIA Formula Two Championship results ===
(key) (Races in bold indicate pole position) (Races in italics indicate fastest lap)

FIA Formula Two Championship results
Year	1	2	3	4	5	6	7	8	9	10	11	12	13	14	15	16	DC	Points
2009	VAL; 1; 4	VAL; 2; 6	BRN; 1; 2	BRN; 2 Ret	SPA; 1; 18	SPA; 2; 8	BRH; 1; 10	BRH; 2; 3	DON; 1; 2	DON; 2; 7	OSC; 1; 5	**OSC**; **2**; 1	IMO; 1; 7	IMO; 2 Ret	CAT; 1; 2	CAT; 2; 7	**3rd**	**59**

=== Complete GP3 Series results ===
(key) (Races in bold indicate pole position) (Races in italics indicate fastest lap)

GP3 Series results
Year	Entrant	1	2	3	4	5	6	7	8	9	10	11	12	13	14	15	16	DC	Points
2010	Carlin	CAT; FEA	CAT; SPR	IST; FEA; Ret	IST; SPR; 22	VAL; FEA	VAL; SPR	SIL; FEA	SIL; SPR	HOC; FEA	HOC; SPR	HUN; FEA	HUN; SPR	SPA; FEA	SPA; SPR	MNZ; FEA	MNZ; SPR	37th	0

=== 24 Hours of Daytona ===
(key)

24 Hours of Daytona results
Year	Class	No	Team	Car	Co-drivers	Laps	Position	Class Pos.
2014	GTD	72	(United States) SMP/ESM Racing	Ferrari 458	(Russia) Boris Rotenberg (Russia) Sergey Zlobin (Italy) Maurizio Mediani (Finland) Mika Salo	662	21	4

=== IndyCar Series ===
(key)

IndyCar Series results
Year	Team	No.	Chassis	Engine	1	2	3	4	5	6	7	8	9	10	11	12	13	14	15	16	17	18	Rank	Points	Ref
2014	Schmidt Peterson Motorsports	7	Dallara DW12	Honda	STP; 12	LBH; 6	ALA; 22	IMS; 25	INDY; 21	DET; 17	DET; 7	TXS; 7	HOU; 23	HOU; 2	POC; 7	IOW; 21	TOR; 11	TOR; 23	MOH; 14	MIL; 8	SNM; 7	FON; DNS	**16th**	**372**	
2015	Schmidt Peterson Motorsports	77	Dallara DW12	Honda	STP	NLA	LBH	ALA	IMS	INDY	DET	DET	TXS	TOR	FON	MIL	IOW	MOH	POC	SNM; 10			33rd	40	
2016	Schmidt Peterson Motorsports	7	Dallara DW12	Honda	STP; 5	PHX; 17	LBH; 16	ALA; 17	IMS; 13	INDY; 27	DET; 15	DET; 17	RDA; 16	IOW; 5	TOR; 6	MOH; 17	**POC**; 2	TXS; 16	WGL; 22	SNM; 11			15th	347	
2017	Schmidt Peterson Motorsports	7	Dallara DW12	Honda	STP; 14	LBH; 12	ALA; 10	PHX; 17	IMS; 18	INDY; 13	DET; 6	DET; 16	TXS; 15	RDA; 10	IOW; 21	TOR	MOH; 14	POC	GTW	WGL	SNM		19th	237	

==== Indianapolis 500 ====
Indianapolis 500
Year	Chassis	Engine	Start	Finish	Team
2014	Dallara	Honda	15	21	Schmidt Peterson Hamilton Motorsports
2016	Dallara	Honda	7	27	Schmidt Peterson Motorsports
2017	Dallara	Honda	13	13	Schmidt Peterson Motorsports

=== Complete European Le Mans Series results ===
European Le Mans Series results
Year	Entrant	Class	Chassis	Engine	1	2	3	4	5	Rank	Points
2015	AF Corse	LMP2	Oreca 03	Nissan VK45DE 4.5 L V8	SIL; 8					5th	56
2015	SMP Racing	LMP2	BR Engineering BR01	Nissan VK45DE 4.5 L V8		IMO; 8	RBR; 3			5th	56
2015	AF Racing	LMP2	BR Engineering BR01	Nissan VK45DE 4.5 L V8				LEC; 2	EST; 3	5th	56

=== Complete 24 Hours of Le Mans results ===
24 Hours of Le Mans results
Year	Team	Co-Drivers	Car	Class	Laps	Pos.	Class Pos.
2015	(Russia) SMP Racing	(Russia) Kirill Ladygin (Russia) Anton Ladygin	BR Engineering BR01-Nissan	LMP2	322	33rd	13th
2016	(Russia) SMP Racing	(Italy) Maurizio Mediani (France) Nicolas Minassian	BR Engineering BR01-Nissan	LMP2	347	11th	7th
2017	(Russia) SMP Racing	(Russia) Sergey Sirotkin (Russia) Viktor Shaytar	Dallara P217-Gibson	LMP2	330	33rd	16th
2018	(Russia) SMP Racing	(Russia) Vitaly Petrov (United Kingdom) Jenson Button	BR Engineering BR1-AER	LMP1	315	DNF	DNF
2019	(Russia) SMP Racing	(Russia) Vitaly Petrov (Belgium) Stoffel Vandoorne	BR Engineering BR1-AER	LMP1	379	**3rd**	**3rd**

=== Complete FIA World Endurance Championship results ===
FIA World Endurance Championship results
Year	Entrant	Class	Car	Engine	1	2	3	4	5	6	7	8	9	Rank	Points
2016	SMP Racing	LMP2	BR Engineering BR01	Nissan VK45DE 4.5 L V8	SIL	SPA	LMS; 7	NÜR	MEX	COA	FUJ; 8	SHA; 6	BHR; 9	16th	34
2018–19	SMP Racing	LMP1	BR Engineering BR1	AER P60B 2.4 L Turbo V6	SPA; 5	LMS; Ret	SIL; Ret	FUJ; 4	SHA; 3	SEB; 3	SPA; 3	LMS; 3		4th	94

Sporting positions
Preceded by Pastor Maldonado	Italian Formula Renault 2.0 Winter Series; Champion; 2004	Succeeded by Atte Mustonen
Preceded by Bertrand Baguette	Formula Renault 3.5 Series; Champion; 2010	Succeeded by Robert Wickens
