= 2017 Chevrolet Detroit Grand Prix =

(United States) 2017 Detroit
Race details
7th and 8th round of the 2017 IndyCar Series season
← Previous race	Next race →
- Date: June 3 and 4, 2017
- Official name: Chevrolet Detroit Grand Prix presented by Lear Corporation
- Location: The Raceway on Belle Isle
- Course: Temporary street circuit 2.350 mi / 3.782 km
- Distance: 70 laps 164.500 mi / 264.737 km
Race 1

Pole position
- Driver: (United States) Graham Rahal (Rahal Letterman Lanigan Racing)
- Time: 1:13.9681

Fastest lap
- Driver: (United States) Josef Newgarden (Team Penske)
- Time: 1:14.2062 (on lap 49 of 70)

Podium
- First: (United States) Graham Rahal (Rahal Letterman Lanigan Racing)
- Second: (New Zealand) Scott Dixon (Chip Ganassi Racing)
- Third: (Canada) James Hinchcliffe (Schmidt Peterson Motorsports)
Race 2

Pole position
- Driver: (Japan) Takuma Sato (Andretti Autosport)
- Time: 1:13.6732

Fastest lap
- Driver: (United States) Josef Newgarden (Team Penske)
- Time: 1:14.6385 (on lap 59 of 70)

Podium
- First: (United States) Graham Rahal (Rahal Letterman Lanigan Racing)
- Second: (United States) Josef Newgarden (Team Penske)
- Third: (Australia) Will Power (Team Penske)

The Chevrolet Detroit Grand Prix presented by Lear Corporation was the lone doubleheader event of the 2017 IndyCar Series season, consisting of the 7th and 8th rounds of the championship. The event was held at the Raceway at Belle Isle in Detroit, Michigan. Graham Rahal dominated the weekend, leading the most laps and winning both races.

== Race 1 – Saturday, June 3 ==
=== Qualifying ===
Qualifying for race one was held in the morning of June 3. Due to time constraints, the session consisted of only what would be round 1 of a normal IndyCar qualifying session. Initially, it appeared that Hélio Castroneves qualified first, but was ruled to have failed to slow for a yellow flag, resulting in his fastest time being disallowed. As such, Graham Rahal inherited the pole position with a new track-record time of 1:13.9681 at an average speed of 114.37 mph (184.07 km/h). Castroneves still started second, as his second fastest lap still put him the fastest of his group. Takuma Sato, fresh off his Indy 500 victory, qualified third, with his teammate Alexander Rossi fourth. James Hinchcliffe rounded out the top five.

=== Race ===
The race was held later that afternoon. The start saw Graham Rahal hold the lead over Hélio Castroneves after the first turns. Behind them, James Hinchcliffe lost control of his car in turn 1 and spun, bringing out the race's first caution period. Hinchcliffe was able to avoid contact with anything during the incident and continue on in the race. Racing resumed on lap 5, with the running order remaining roughly the same. Around lap 10, drivers attempting to use a three-stop strategy during the race began to pit, including Castroneves, Josef Newgarden, and Takuma Sato. Those attempting a two-stop strategy began their stops at roughly lap 20, including Rahal, Alexander Rossi, and Scott Dixon. After the pit cycle was complete, Castroneves and Newgarden had inherited the first two spots, with Rahal on his two-stop strategy some six seconds adrift.

On lap 25, caution flew for the second and final time when Conor Daly's car lost power in turn 3 directly in front of Charlie Kimball, causing the two to make contact and causing damage to Kimball's to front wing. Kimball was able to continue on and get repairs to the damage, but Daly's car ground to a halt and was unable to be restarted, making him the race's only retirement. During the caution, Newgarden elected to make his second stop, the only front-runner to do so during the period. The top five became Castroneves, Rahal, Takuma Sato, Rossi, and Hinchcliffe, who had finally managed to recover from his first lap spin.

Racing resumed on lap 31 with the leaders staying in order. Five laps later, Castroneves pitted for the second time, moving Rahal back into the lead of the race. Sato pitted shortly thereafter, moving Rossi to second and Hinchcliffe to third. Those on two-stop strategies began to pit just after lap 45 for their final stops. After the cycle, Rahal held the lead over Castroneves, though Castroneves made his final stop shortly thereafter, moving Scott Dixon into second place, while James Hinchcliffe held third. This order would stay the same for the remainder of the race, as Rahal crossed the line just over six seconds ahead of Dixon. Hinchcliffe managed to just stave off a hard charging Josef Newgarden, while Alexander Rossi held rounded out the top five.

Rahal's victory made him the seventh driver in seven races to win during the 2017 IndyCar Series season. For Rahal, it was his fifth career victory and his first on a street circuit since his first win at St. Petersburg in 2008.

=== Results ===
Key	Meaning
R	Rookie
W	Past winner
W1	Past winner of race 1 in doubleheader
W2	Past winner of race 2 in doubleheader

==== Qualifying ====
Pos	No.	Name	Group	Time
1	15	(United States) Graham Rahal	1	1:13.9681
2	3	(Brazil) Hélio Castroneves W W2	2	1:14.0414
3	26	(Japan) Takuma Sato	1	1:14.0428
4	98	(United States) Alexander Rossi	2	1:14.0875
5	5	(Canada) James Hinchcliffe	1	1:14.1801
6	9	(New Zealand) Scott Dixon W	2	1:14.2855
7	1	(France) Simon Pagenaud W2	1	1:14.3150
8	8	(United Kingdom) Max Chilton	2	1:14.9991
9	2	(United States) Josef Newgarden	1	1:14.3805
10	83	(United States) Charlie Kimball	2	1:15.0664
11	12	(Australia) Will Power W1 W2	1	1:14.6312
12	28	(United States) Ryan Hunter-Reay	2	1:15.0991
13	27	(United States) Marco Andretti	1	1:14.6719
14	14	(Colombia) Carlos Muñoz W1	2	1:15.2060
15	10	(Brazil) Tony Kanaan W	1	1:15.2668
16	4	(United States) Conor Daly	2	1:15.2228
17	20	(United States) Spencer Pigot	1	1:15.6261
18	21	(United States) J. R. Hildebrand	2	1:15.2334
19	18	(Mexico) Esteban Gutiérrez R	1	1:15.6267
20	7	(Russia) Mikhail Aleshin	2	1:15.2430
21	19	(United Arab Emirates) Ed Jones R	1	1:15.8343
22	16	(Spain) Oriol Servià	2	1:15.2758
OFFICIAL BOX SCORE

==== Race ====
Pos	No.	Driver	Team	Engine	Laps	Time/Retired	Pit Stops	Grid	Laps Led	Pts.^{1}
1	15	(United States) Graham Rahal	Rahal Letterman Lanigan Racing	Honda	70	1:35:48.7028	2	1	55	54
2	9	(New Zealand) Scott Dixon W	Chip Ganassi Racing	Honda	70	+6.1474	2	6	2	41
3	5	(Canada) James Hinchcliffe	Schmidt Peterson Motorsports	Honda	70	+9.1688	3	5	1	36
4	2	(United States) Josef Newgarden	Team Penske	Chevrolet	70	+10.0930	3	9		32
5	98	(United States) Alexander Rossi	Andretti Herta Autosport	Honda	70	+25.5556	2	4		30
6	7	(Russia) Mikhail Aleshin	Schmidt Peterson Motorsports	Honda	70	+31.3644	3	20	1	29
7	3	(Brazil) Hélio Castroneves W W2	Team Penske	Chevrolet	70	+33.1052	3	2	11	28
8	26	(Japan) Takuma Sato	Andretti Autosport	Honda	70	+47.4696	3	3		24
9	19	(United Arab Emirates) Ed Jones R	Dale Coyne Racing	Honda	70	+53.6531	2	21		22
10	20	(United States) Spencer Pigot	Ed Carpenter Racing	Chevrolet	70	+54.0726	3	17		20
11	8	(United Kingdom) Max Chilton	Chip Ganassi Racing	Honda	70	+55.2547	3	8		19
12	27	(United States) Marco Andretti	Andretti Autosport	Honda	70	+58.3402	3	13		18
13	28	(United States) Ryan Hunter-Reay	Andretti Autosport	Honda	70	+59.1348	3	12		17
14	14	(Colombia) Carlos Muñoz W1	A. J. Foyt Enterprises	Chevrolet	70	+1:00.7310	3	14		16
15	10	(Brazil) Tony Kanaan W	Chip Ganassi Racing	Honda	70	+1:01.9596	3	15		15
16	1	(France) Simon Pagenaud W2	Team Penske	Chevrolet	70	+1:02.1492	3	7		14
17	21	(United States) J. R. Hildebrand	Ed Carpenter Racing	Chevrolet	70	+1:06.0717	4	18		13
18	12	(Australia) Will Power W1 W2	Team Penske	Chevrolet	69	+1 Lap	2	11		12
19	18	(Mexico) Esteban Gutiérrez R	Dale Coyne Racing	Honda	69	+1 Lap	2	19		11
20	16	(Spain) Oriol Servià	Rahal Letterman Lanigan Racing	Honda	69	+1 Lap	4	22		10
21	83	(United States) Charlie Kimball	Chip Ganassi Racing	Honda	69	+1 Lap	4	10		9
22	4	(United States) Conor Daly	A. J. Foyt Enterprises	Chevrolet	25	Power Loss	1	16		8
OFFICIAL BOX SCORE

Notes: ^{1} Points include 1 point for leading at least 1 lap during a race, an additional 2 points for leading the most race laps. For Detroit only, 1 bonus point was awarded to the fastest qualifier from both groups.

Source for time gaps:

=== Championship standings ===
Driver standings

	Pos	Driver	Points
3	1	(New Zealand) Scott Dixon	275
1	2	(Brazil) Hélio Castroneves	273
	3	(Japan) Takuma Sato	258
2	4	(France) Simon Pagenaud	248
	5	(United States) Alexander Rossi	220

- Note: Only the top five positions are included.

== Race 2 – Sunday, June 4 ==
=== Qualifying ===
Qualifying for Race 2 was held the morning of June 4, with the same qualifying format as the previous day. Takuma Sato broke the track record that Graham Rahal had set the previous day with a time of 1:13.6732, putting him on pole position. His Andretti Autosport teammate Ryan Hunter-Reay qualified second, while Rahal was third. The top five was rounded out by Hélio Castroneves and James Hinchcliffe. The first group lost a significant amount of their session after Carlos Muñoz crashed into the turn 2 wall.

=== Race ===
The race was held later that afternoon. At the start, Takuma Sato held the lead, with the top five starters remaining in order. Unlike the previous day, the field made it through the first two corners without incident. The leaders stayed mainly the same for the first 10 laps, though James Hinchcliffe elected to pit on lap 6. However, he was hit deemed to have been too fast on pit-lane and was hit with a drive-through penalty, beginning what was a bad day for the team. On lap 10, Graham Rahal managed to pass Ryan Hunter-Reay, moving him up to second. Around the same time, those attempting a three-stop strategy for the race began pitting, including Scott Dixon and Josef Newgarden. Dixon, however, lost a large amount of time due to a fueling issue, dropping him down to 18th. Hélio Castroneves and Hunter-Reay were both forced onto the three-stop strategy after the two made contact when Castroneves attempted a pass, resulting in Castroneves having a tire go flat and Hunter-Reay suffering front wing damage. They emerged from their stops 18th and 19th respectively. After this, the front runners were Sato, Rahal, and Will Power, who had greatly benefited from the Castroneves/Hunter-Reay incident.

At lap 22, stops for those going for a two-stop strategy began, as Sato, Rahal, Power, Simon Pagenaud, and Alexander Rossi all pitted within about 3 laps of this. The stops allowed Rahal to overtake Sato by a margin of 4 seconds, while Dixon managed to move into third, though needed two more stops. The race lead, however, was held by Josef Newgarden on his three-stop strategy, who was actually gaining time on Rahal. However, on lap 29, he, along with Dixon, pitted for the second time, moving Rahal into the lead of the race. Newgarden emerged fifth, while Dixon emerged 10th. The running order was now Rahal, Sato, Power, Pagenaud.

On lap 35, a minor incident occurred when J. R. Hildebrand and Ed Jones made contact, damaging their cars, though no caution came out. At roughly lap 45, the final stops for nearly everyone began, with Rahal maintaining his position. Power was able to move around Sato, but his teammate Newgarden's three-stop strategy had worked well and moved him past Power for second. Newgarden then began trying to catch Rahal.

On lap 66, with the race in its closing laps, caution waved when James Hinchcliffe came to a halt in turn 2. At the same time, Spencer Pigot's engine let go, bringing an end to his race as well. IndyCar officials elected to red flag the race for clean-up to allow for a green flag finish. Racing was resumed with 2 laps to go, but despite the field being bunched up, the top five did not change. Graham Rahal completed his domination of the weekend, winning by just over a second over Josef Newgarden. In doing so, Rahal became the first driver to sweep the doubleheader weekend at Detroit. It also marked the first time in his career that Rahal won consecutive races. Finally, Rahal became the first driver during the 2017 IndyCar Series season to win a second race.

Scott Dixon moved into the points lead after a strong finish in both races, while Hélio Castroneves dropped to second. Rahal's dominant weekend moved him into sixth.

=== Results ===
Key	Meaning
R	Rookie
W	Past winner
W1	Past winner of race 1 in doubleheader
W2	Past winner of race 2 in doubleheader

==== Qualifying ====
Pos	No.	Name	Group	Time
1	26	(Japan) Takuma Sato	2	1:13.6732
2	28	(United States) Ryan Hunter-Reay	1	1:15.2833
3	15	(United States) Graham Rahal W1	2	1:13.8105
4	3	(Brazil) Hélio Castroneves W W2	1	1:15.5279
5	5	(Canada) James Hinchcliffe	2	1:13.8264
6	7	(Russia) Mikhail Aleshin	1	1:16.0371
7	12	(Australia) Will Power W1 W2	2	1:13.9449
8	9	(New Zealand) Scott Dixon W	1	1:16.1727
9	27	(United States) Marco Andretti	2	1:14.0339
10	4	(United States) Conor Daly	1	1:16.1732
11	1	(France) Simon Pagenaud W2	2	1:14.0765
12	83	(United States) Charlie Kimball	1	1:16.1800
13	2	(United States) Josef Newgarden	2	1:14.1814
14	98	(United States) Alexander Rossi	1	1:16.2884
15	10	(Brazil) Tony Kanaan W	2	1:14.3287
16	8	(United Kingdom) Max Chilton	1	1:16.5150
17	19	(United Arab Emirates) Ed Jones R	2	1:14.7786
18	21	(United States) J. R. Hildebrand	1	1:18.6272
19	18	(Mexico) Esteban Gutiérrez R	2	1:15.0055
20	16	(Spain) Oriol Servià	1	1:21.4485
21	20	(United States) Spencer Pigot	2	1:15.8491
22	14	(Colombia) Carlos Muñoz W1	1	No Time
OFFICIAL BOX SCORE

==== Race ====
Pos	No.	Driver	Team	Engine	Laps	Time/Retired	Pit Stops	Grid	Laps Led	Pts.^{1}
1	15	(United States) Graham Rahal W1	Rahal Letterman Lanigan Racing	Honda	70	1:33:36.3769	2	3	41	53
2	2	(United States) Josef Newgarden	Team Penske	Chevrolet	70	+1.1772	3	13	7	41
3	12	(Australia) Will Power W1 W2	Team Penske	Chevrolet	70	+2.6228	2	7		35
4	26	(Japan) Takuma Sato	Andretti Autosport	Honda	70	+3.8535	2	1	22	34
5	1	(France) Simon Pagenaud W2	Team Penske	Chevrolet	70	+4.0810	2	11		30
6	9	(New Zealand) Scott Dixon W	Chip Ganassi Racing	Honda	70	+4.6005	3	8		28
7	98	(United States) Alexander Rossi	Andretti Herta Autosport	Honda	70	+6.1978	2	14		26
8	83	(United States) Charlie Kimball	Chip Ganassi Racing	Honda	70	+6.6823	2	12		24
9	3	(Brazil) Hélio Castroneves W W2	Team Penske	Chevrolet	70	+6.8439	3	4		22
10	10	(Brazil) Tony Kanaan W	Chip Ganassi Racing	Honda	70	+7.7201	4	15		20
11	14	(Colombia) Carlos Muñoz W1	A. J. Foyt Enterprises	Chevrolet	70	+8.1160	3	22		19
12	4	(United States) Conor Daly	A. J. Foyt Enterprises	Chevrolet	70	+8.7847	3	10		18
13	27	(United States) Marco Andretti	Andretti Autosport	Honda	70	+9.6103	3	9		17
14	18	(Mexico) Esteban Gutiérrez R	Dale Coyne Racing	Honda	70	+13.1325	2	19		16
15	8	(United Kingdom) Max Chilton	Chip Ganassi Racing	Honda	69	+1 Lap	3	16		15
16	7	(Russia) Mikhail Aleshin	Schmidt Peterson Motorsports	Honda	69	+1 Lap	4	6		14
17	28	(United States) Ryan Hunter-Reay	Andretti Autosport	Honda	69	+1 Lap	3	2		14
18	21	(United States) J. R. Hildebrand	Ed Carpenter Racing	Chevrolet	69	+1 Lap	4	18		12
19	16	(Spain) Oriol Servià	Rahal Letterman Lanigan Racing	Honda	69	+1 Lap	4	20		11
20	5	(Canada) James Hinchcliffe	Schmidt Peterson Motorsports	Honda	65	Mechanical	4	5		10
21	20	(United States) Spencer Pigot	Ed Carpenter Racing	Chevrolet	65	Engine	3	21		9
22	19	(United Arab Emirates) Ed Jones R	Dale Coyne Racing	Honda	60	Mechanical	4	17		8
OFFICIAL BOX SCORE

Notes: ^{1} Points include 1 point for leading at least 1 lap during a race, an additional 2 points for leading the most race laps. For Detroit only, 1 bonus point was awarded to the fastest qualifier from both groups.

Source for time gaps:

=== Championship standings ===
Driver standings

	Pos	Driver	Points
	1	(New Zealand) Scott Dixon	303
	2	(Brazil) Hélio Castroneves	295
	3	(Japan) Takuma Sato	292
	4	(France) Simon Pagenaud	278
1	5	(United States) Josef Newgarden	259

Manufacturer standings

Pos	Manufacturer	Points
1	(Japan) Honda	664
2	(United States) Chevrolet	608

- Note: Only the top five positions are included.

Previous race: 2017 Indianapolis 500	IndyCar Series; 2017 season	Next race: 2017 Rainguard Water Sealers 600
Previous race: 2016 Chevrolet Dual in Detroit	Chevrolet Detroit Grand Prix	Next race: 2018 Chevrolet Detroit Grand Prix
