= 2016 Chevrolet Detroit Belle Isle Grand Prix =

(United States) 2016 Detroit
Race details
7th and 8th round of the 2016 IndyCar Series season
← Previous race	Next race →
- Date: June 4 and 5, 2016
- Official name: Chevrolet Dual in Detroit presented by Quicken Loans
- Location: The Raceway on Belle Isle
- Course: Temporary street circuit 2.350 mi / 3.782 km
- Distance: 70 laps 164.500 mi / 264.737 km
Race 1

Pole position
- Driver: (France) Simon Pagenaud (Team Penske)
- Time: 1:14.9166

Fastest lap
- Driver: (New Zealand) Scott Dixon (Chip Ganassi Racing)
- Time: 1:14.6675 (on lap 30 of 70)

Podium
- First: (France) Sébastien Bourdais (KVSH Racing)
- Second: (United States) Conor Daly (Dale Coyne Racing)
- Third: (Colombia) Juan Pablo Montoya (Team Penske)
Race 2

Pole position
- Driver: (France) Simon Pagenaud (Team Penske)
- Time: 1:14.0379

Fastest lap
- Driver: (United States) Josef Newgarden (Ed Carpenter Racing)
- Time: 1:14.5568 (on lap 69 of 70)

Podium
- First: (Australia) Will Power (Team Penske)
- Second: (France) Simon Pagenaud (Team Penske)
- Third: (United States) Ryan Hunter-Reay (Andretti Autosport)

The 2016 Chevrolet Dual in Detroit presented by Quicken Loans was the only doubleheader event of the 2016 IndyCar Series, consisting of both the seventh and eighth rounds of the championship. The event took place at The Raceway at Belle Isle, a temporary street circuit in Detroit, Michigan. Both races were contested over 70 laps. The race marked the seventh time that the course had been used for IndyCar Series racing and the fourth time that the venue had featured a doubleheader weekend with two races.

Initial practice sessions and qualifying for the first race took place on June 3, 2016. Simon Pagenaud qualified on pole with a time of 1:14.9166, leading a Team Penske sweep of the top three positions. In the race, however, strategy miscues by Penske would give victory to KVSH Racing's Sébastien Bourdais. Second place went to Conor Daly for Dale Coyne Racing, while third went to Penske's lone representative on the podium, Juan Pablo Montoya.

Qualifying for race two was held the morning of the race on June 5. Simon Pagenaud once again qualified on pole, this time with a time of 1:14.0379. In the race, though, his Team Penske teammate Will Power would be faster, taking his first victory in more than a year. Pagenaud finished in second, while the final step of the podium went to Ryan Hunter-Reay for Andretti Autosport.

== Race 1 – Saturday, June 4 ==
Qualifying for race one occurred on June 3, 2016. Simon Pagenaud qualified on pole for the third time of the 2016 season with a time of 1:14.9166. His teammates Hélio Castroneves and Juan Pablo Montoya qualified in second and third, respectively. Castroneves broke the track record for the course during round two of qualifications, setting a time of 1:14.6899.

The race began cleanly, with the Team Penske trio of Pagenaud, Castroneves, and Montoya maintaining their positions and James Hinchcliffe settling into fourth place behind them. Alternate pit stop strategies began on lap 2, with drivers such as Sébastien Bourdais and Ryan Hunter-Reay coming in to try to gain an advantage via strategy. On lap 10, the first caution flag of the race came out when Max Chilton crashed into the right-side wall on the backstretch from what appeared to be a broken suspension. While most drivers pitted, Simon Pagenaud and Hélio Castroneves stayed out, attempting to stretch the life of their tires. On the restart, Pagenaud was able to pull out a lead, but when he was finally forced to pit, the lead was handed over to Will Power. Pagenaud regained the lead on lap 31, when Power and Juan Pablo Montoya lost momentum while battling for the lead immediately after their own pit stops. Pagenaud once again began pulling out a lead.

On lap 42, the caution came out for the second time, this time for James Hinchcliffe, who spun and crashed into the tire barrier in turn seven while running in the fifth position. The caution caused a split in strategy; several drivers, including Juan Pablo Montoya, Scott Dixon, Sébastien Bourdais, and Conor Daly elected to stay out. Others, such as Simon Pagenaud and Will Power, elected to pit. For those that pitted, Power was the first off of pit lane. However, Power was released before his right rear tire was secured, forcing him to pull into a runoff area in turn three during the caution period just moments after leaving the pits. Stranded far from the pits and without a wheel nut to secure his right-rear tire, Power would have to retire from the race.

When racing resumed, Montoya held the lead until lap 52, when he pitted for the final time of the race. Scott Dixon pitted on lap 55, but appeared to have gearbox issues once he returned to the track. He retired from the race one lap later. On lap 57, Sébastien Bourdais pitted from the lead, but had built enough of a gap that he was able to come back out ahead of Simon Pagenaud and Hélio Castroneves, both of whom were attempting to save fuel in order to avoid having to pit again, as well as Montoya. The lead was briefly handed to Conor Daly before he came in for a splash of fuel, but no new tires. He emerged in second place behind Bourdais and was able to bring the gap between them down to 1.1 seconds, but on old tires, Daly eventually fell behind again. Bourdais took victory for his 35th career IndyCar victory, tying him for sixth in all-time IndyCar victories with Bobby Unser. Conor Daly managed to hold on to second place to secure the first podium finish of his career, while Juan Pablo Montoya was the highest-finishing Penske driver with a third-place finish. Simon Pagenaud, who led much of the early race, ran out of fuel on the final lap and fell to a distant 13th place.

=== Qualifying ===
Pos	No.	Name	Grp.	Round 1	Round 2	Round 3
1	22	(France) Simon Pagenaud W2	2	1:15.6258	1:14.9932	1:14.9166
2	3	(Brazil) Hélio Castroneves W W2	2	1:15.6004	1:14.6899	1:14.9285
3	2	(Colombia) Juan Pablo Montoya	1	1:15.4335	1:15.1583	1:15.5659
4	5	(Canada) James Hinchcliffe	1	1:15.9092	1:15.3848	1:15.7708
5	26	(Colombia) Carlos Muñoz W1	2	1:15.7930	1:15.4256	1:16.3897
6	9	(New Zealand) Scott Dixon W	1	1:15.3822	1:14.7867	1:16.4613
7	10	(Brazil) Tony Kanaan W	1	1:15.3884	1:15.5508	
8	83	(United States) Charlie Kimball	2	1:16.0651	1:15.6712	
9	12	(Australia) Will Power W1	1	1:15.7547	1:15.7142	
10	15	(United States) Graham Rahal	2	1:16.2400	1:15.7172	
11	14	(Japan) Takuma Sato	1	1:15.6938	1:16.0998	
12	7	(Russia) Mikhail Aleshin	2	1:16.2666	1:16.2665	
13	11	(France) Sébastien Bourdais W2	1	1:16.1087		
14	21	(United States) Josef Newgarden	2	1:16.3154		
15	28	(United States) Ryan Hunter-Reay	1	1:16.2643		
16	18	(United States) Conor Daly R	2	1:16.6370		
17	98	(United States) Alexander Rossi R	1	1:16.4512		
18	8	(United Kingdom) Max Chilton R	2	1:16.7138		
19	27	(United States) Marco Andretti	1	1:16.4965		
20	19	(Colombia) Gabby Chaves	2	1:16.9140		
21	20	(United States) Spencer Pigot R	1	1:17.6894		
22	41	(United Kingdom) Jack Hawksworth	2	1:18.3918		
Official Box Score

Source for individual rounds:

=== Race results ===
Pos	No.	Driver	Team	Engine	Laps	Time/Retired	Pit Stops	Grid	Laps Led	Pts.^{1}
1	11	(France) Sébastien Bourdais W2	KVSH Racing	Chevrolet	70	1:40:51.6838	4	13	12	51
2	18	(United States) Conor Daly R	Dale Coyne Racing	Honda	70	+2.0401	5	16	4	41
3	2	(Colombia) Juan Pablo Montoya	Team Penske	Chevrolet	70	+5.7067	3	3	13	36
4	15	(United States) Graham Rahal	Rahal Letterman Lanigan Racing	Honda	70	+7.4793	3	10		32
5	3	(Brazil) Hélio Castroneves W W2	Team Penske	Chevrolet	70	+40.0139	2	2		30
6	26	(Colombia) Carlos Muñoz W1	Andretti Autosport	Honda	70	+40.7592	2	5		28
7	28	(United States) Ryan Hunter-Reay	Andretti Autosport	Honda	70	+42.2990	3	15		26
8	83	(United States) Charlie Kimball	Chip Ganassi Racing	Chevrolet	70	+44.4699	4	8		24
9	10	(Brazil) Tony Kanaan W	Chip Ganassi Racing	Chevrolet	70	+45.5832	4	7		22
10	98	(United States) Alexander Rossi R	Andretti Herta Autosport	Honda	70	+48.2961	3	17		20
11	14	(Japan) Takuma Sato	A. J. Foyt Enterprises	Honda	70	+51.1067	4	11		19
12	19	(Colombia) Gabby Chaves	Dale Coyne Racing	Honda	70	+51.3213	3	20		18
13	22	(France) Simon Pagenaud W2	Team Penske	Chevrolet	70	+52.5313	2	1	35	21
14	21	(United States) Josef Newgarden	Ed Carpenter Racing	Chevrolet	70	+1:06.2350	4	14		16
15	7	(Russia) Mikhail Aleshin	Schmidt Peterson Motorsports	Honda	70	+1:14.1421	4	12		15
16	27	(United States) Marco Andretti	Andretti Autosport	Honda	69	+1 Lap	5	19		14
17	20	(United States) Spencer Pigot R	Ed Carpenter Racing	Chevrolet	69	+1 Lap	6	21		13
18	5	(Canada) James Hinchcliffe	Schmidt Peterson Motorsports	Honda	65	+5 Laps	4	4		12
19	9	(New Zealand) Scott Dixon W	Chip Ganassi Racing	Chevrolet	56	Electrical	4	6	1	12
20	12	(Australia) Will Power W1	Team Penske	Chevrolet	44	Mechanical	3	9	5	11
21	8	(United Kingdom) Max Chilton R	Chip Ganassi Racing	Chevrolet	8	Contact	1	18		9
22	41	(United Kingdom) Jack Hawksworth	A. J. Foyt Enterprises	Honda	0	Mechanical	0	22		8
Official Box Score

Notes: ^{1} Points include 1 point for leading at least 1 lap during a race, an additional 2 points for leading the most race laps, and 1 point for Pole Position.

Source for time gaps:

Key	Meaning
R	Rookie
W	Past winner
W1	Past winner of race 1 in doubleheader
W2	Past winner of race 2 in doubleheader

== Race 2 - Sunday, June 5 ==
Qualifying for the second race was held the morning of the race on June 5. Due to time constraints, qualifying consisted only of what would be round 1 for a normal road course qualifying session. Simon Pagenaud once again qualified on pole, sweeping both sessions for the Dual in Detroit and gaining his fourth pole position in the last five races. Ryan Hunter-Reay qualified second. Will Power broke the track record set on the previous day during the session with a time of 1:13.8335. However, his fastest two laps were disallowed, as race control deemed that Power had interfered with a qualifying attempt being made by Marco Andretti. Power would still rank fourth in the session, but the qualifying format meant that he would actually start from eighth. Both Conor Daly and Marco Andretti would lose the fastest laps of their respective sessions for causing local yellows on the race course. Alexander Rossi had the best lap of his session disallowed for ignoring yellow flags during one of these local yellows.

Unlike the previous day's event, early trouble occurred for several drivers. During the parade laps, Graham Rahal, who was supposed to start from the fourth position, came into pit lane to get repairs after complaining of his brake pedal being "soft". He would return to the track before the race began, but at the tail end of the field. As the race began, an incident occurred in turn one. Charlie Kimball moved to his left before turn one to avoid Jack Hawksworth, which forced Carlos Muñoz to take evasive actions to his left, which in turn forced James Hinchcliffe into the wall. As cars moved to avoid Hinchcliffe's now wrecked car, Takuma Sato made contact with Alexander Rossi, sending Sato into a spin. Max Chilton was forced into the wall trying to avoid Sato. Finally, Marco Andretti was the last car involved after he ran over the front wing of Sato's stationary car. Hinchcliffe and Chilton retired from the race, while the others involved carried on.

Racing resumed on lap five, with Simon Pagenaud holding his lead over Ryan Hunter-Reay and Tony Kanaan. On lap 24, Juan Pablo Montoya and Scott Dixon made contact in turn seven, damaging Montoya's front wing and puncturing one of Dixon's tires, hampering both of their races. Dixon, however, would eventually recover. As pit stops began to cycle through, Hunter-Reay dropped back to fourth as Kanaan and Sébastien Bourdais moved up. On lap 34, the second caution of the day occurred when Montoya, on his out lap after switching to black tires, hit the wall in turn 10. Montoya retired from the race and would finish 20th. The race resumed on lap 38 with Pagenaud now leading over his teammate Hélio Castroneves. The next lap, however, Castroneves grabbed the lead and began to pull away. The race appeared to be in Castroneves's hands.

On lap 50, in the midst of green flag pit stops, the caution flew for the third time of the race when Jack Hawksworth rolled to a stop on track. While most leaders had already pitted, Castroneves had not and was forced to pit under the caution, dropping him to 15th place. The lead was handed to Sébastien Bourdais, but he and the three drivers behind him all still needed to make one more stop in order to reach the end of the race. The first two drivers in the field that did not need to pit again were Simon Pagenaud and Will Power, who were fifth and sixth, respectively, on the restart. On the lap of the restart, Power quickly dispatched of Pagenaud in turn three, taking what would eventually become the lead. When Power finally inherited the lead on lap 61, he held a roughly 1.7 second lead on Pagenaud. While the gap came down in the closing laps, Power would hang on to the end of the race and take victory. It was his first victory since the 2015 Grand Prix of Indianapolis. Pagenaud maintained his second place, while Ryan Hunter-Reay came across the line third for his first podium since St. Petersburg. Hélio Castroneves was only able to move up to 14th on a day that had initially looked promising for him. Conor Daly was once again the highest finishing rookie in the race, taking sixth place.

=== Qualifying ===
Pos	No.	Name	Grp.	Time
1	22	(France) Simon Pagenaud W2	1	1:14.0379
2	28	(United States) Ryan Hunter-Reay	2	1:14.5621
3	3	(Brazil) Hélio Castroneves W W2	1	1:14.1904
4	9	(New Zealand) Scott Dixon W	2	1:14.6867
5	7	(Russia) Mikhail Aleshin	1	1:14.7256
6	10	(Brazil) Tony Kanaan W	2	1:14.8163
7	15	(United States) Graham Rahal	1	1:14.7786
8	12	(Australia) Will Power W1	2	1:14.8392
9	41	(United Kingdom) Jack Hawksworth	1	1:14.9349
10	2	(Colombia) Juan Pablo Montoya	2	1:14.8486
11	83	(United States) Charlie Kimball	1	1:15.1345
12	11	(France) Sébastien Bourdais W1 W2	2	1:15.1690
13	26	(Colombia) Carlos Muñoz W1	1	1:15.2094
14	5	(Canada) James Hinchcliffe	2	1:15.5692
15	19	(Colombia) Gabby Chaves	1	1:15.2840
16	14	(Japan) Takuma Sato	2	1:15.5987
17	21	(United States) Josef Newgarden	1	1:15.4653
18	98	(United States) Alexander Rossi R	2	1:15.6904
19	8	(United Kingdom) Max Chilton R	1	1:15.4678
20	20	(United States) Spencer Pigot R	2	1:16.1132
21	18	(United States) Conor Daly R	1	1:15.4766
22	27	(United States) Marco Andretti	2	1:16.4531
Official Box Score

=== Race results ===
Pos	No.	Driver	Team	Engine	Laps	Time/Retired	Pit Stops	Grid	Laps Led	Pts.^{1}
1	12	(Australia) Will Power W1	Team Penske	Chevrolet	70	1:42:22.2672	3	8	10	51
2	22	(France) Simon Pagenaud W2	Team Penske	Chevrolet	70	+0.9203	3	1	40	44
3	28	(United States) Ryan Hunter-Reay	Andretti Autosport	Honda	70	+1.4711	3	2		36
4	21	(United States) Josef Newgarden	Ed Carpenter Racing	Chevrolet	70	+2.4602	2	17		32
5	9	(New Zealand) Scott Dixon W	Chip Ganassi Racing	Chevrolet	70	+3.1575	3	4		30
6	18	(United States) Conor Daly R	Dale Coyne Racing	Honda	70	+7.1263	3	21		28
7	10	(Brazil) Tony Kanaan W	Chip Ganassi Racing	Chevrolet	70	+11.3012	4	6		26
8	11	(France) Sébastien Bourdais W1 W2	KVSH Racing	Chevrolet	70	+12.9361	4	12	8	25
9	27	(United States) Marco Andretti	Andretti Autosport	Honda	70	+26.5201	5	22		22
10	14	(Japan) Takuma Sato	A. J. Foyt Enterprises	Honda	70	+27.7105	5	16		20
11	15	(United States) Graham Rahal	Rahal Letterman Lanigan Racing	Honda	70	+28.0410	6	7	1	20
12	98	(United States) Alexander Rossi R	Andretti Herta Autosport	Honda	70	+28.5507	5	18	1	19
13	19	(Colombia) Gabby Chaves	Dale Coyne Racing	Honda	70	+29.2530	4	15		17
14	3	(Brazil) Hélio Castroneves W W2	Team Penske	Chevrolet	70	+29.6631	3	3	10	17
15	26	(Colombia) Carlos Muñoz W1	Andretti Autosport	Honda	70	+30.4879	4	13		15
16	83	(United States) Charlie Kimball	Chip Ganassi Racing	Chevrolet	70	+30.6922	4	11		14
17	7	(Russia) Mikhail Aleshin	Schmidt Peterson Motorsports	Honda	70	+1:10.5229	5	5		13
18	20	(United States) Spencer Pigot R	Ed Carpenter Racing	Chevrolet	67	+3 Laps	5	20		12
19	41	(United Kingdom) Jack Hawksworth	A. J. Foyt Enterprises	Honda	48	Mechanical	4	9		11
20	2	(Colombia) Juan Pablo Montoya	Team Penske	Chevrolet	33	Contact	3	10		10
21	5	(Canada) James Hinchcliffe	Schmidt Peterson Motorsports	Honda	0	Contact	0	14		9
22	8	(United Kingdom) Max Chilton R	Chip Ganassi Racing	Chevrolet	0	Contact	0	19		8
Official Box Score

Notes: ^{1} Points include 1 point for leading at least 1 lap during a race, an additional 2 points for leading the most race laps, and 1 point for Pole Position.

Source for time gaps:

Key	Meaning
R	Rookie
W	Past winner
W1	Past winner of race 1 in doubleheader
W2	Past winner of race 2 in doubleheader

== Championship standings ==
Drivers' Championship standings after race 1

	Pos	Driver	Points
	1	(France) Simon Pagenaud	313
1	2	(Brazil) Hélio Castroneves	254
1	3	(New Zealand) Scott Dixon	247
3	4	(Colombia) Carlos Muñoz	227
1	5	(United States) Josef Newgarden	227

Drivers' Championship standings after race 2

	Pos	Driver	Points
	1	(France) Simon Pagenaud	357
1	2	(New Zealand) Scott Dixon	277
1	3	(Brazil) Hélio Castroneves	271
1	4	(United States) Josef Newgarden	259
2	5	(United States) Alexander Rossi	242

- Note: Only the top five positions are included.

Previous race: 2016 Indianapolis 500	IndyCar Series; 2016 season	Next race: 2016 Kohler Grand Prix
Previous race: 2015 Chevrolet Dual in Detroit	Chevrolet Dual in Detroit	Next race: 2017 Chevrolet Detroit Grand Prix
