= 2017 Rainguard Water Sealers 600 =

(United States) 2017 Rainguard Water Sealers 600
Race details
9th round of the 2017 IndyCar Series season
← Previous race	Next race →
- Date: June 10, 2017
- Official name: Rainguard Water Sealers 600
- Location: Texas Motor Speedway
- Course: Permanent racing facility 1.455 mi / 2.342 km
- Distance: 248 laps 360.8 mi / 580.8 km

Pole position
- Driver: (United States) Charlie Kimball (Chip Ganassi Racing)
- Time: 23.3131 + 23.2730 = 46.5861; 222.556 mph (358.169 km/h)

Fastest lap
- Driver: (Brazil) Tony Kanaan (Chip Ganassi Racing)
- Time: 226.930 mph (365.208 km/h); 23.0816 (on lap 232 of 248)

Podium
- First: (Australia) Will Power (Team Penske)
- Second: (Brazil) Tony Kanaan (Chip Ganassi Racing)
- Third: (France) Simon Pagenaud (Team Penske)

The 2017 Rainguard Water Sealers 600 was the ninth round of the 2017 IndyCar Series season, contested over 248 laps at the 1.5-mile (2.4 km) Texas Motor Speedway in Fort Worth, Texas. Charlie Kimball started from the pole position, the first of his career. Will Power of Team Penske won the race, leading 180 of the 248 laps. The race was marred by numerous crashes that left only six undamaged cars and by issues with blistering tires that forced the series to call for competition cautions and mandatory tire stops every 30 laps in the latter stages of the race.

== Report ==
=== Background ===
Texas Motor Speedway is a 1.5-mile (2.4 km) oval located in Fort Worth, Texas. The track has been hosting IndyCar Series races since 1997.

Following a series of incidents in 2016 with weepers (water penetrating on the pavement after rain) that caused the 2016 INDYCAR race to have been postponed initially one day, and then to late August, ten weeks and the November 2016 NASCAR race with a long delay caused by weepers while attempting to dry the track, in January 2017 during the NASCAR media tour, Texas Motor Speedway announced it would alter the circuit while installing a new French drain system to send rain water down pipes to fix the problem. Turns 1 and 2 were widened by 20 feet (6.1 m), while the banking was also lowered from 24 to 20 degrees. Driver Ed Carpenter noted, "The track is absolutely different. The reshaping of Turns 1 and 2, with the width and the change in banking, definitely make the track more challenging to get the balance the same from Turns 1 and 2 to 3 and 4."

Entering the race, Dale Coyne Racing rookie Esteban Gutiérrez was forced to sit out the race due to INDYCAR's regulations on driver experience in regards to high-speed ovals, with Tristan Vautier replacing him for the round. Gutiérrez's advisor, former driver Adrián Fernández, agreed, "Texas is one of the most difficult ovals to just come and race, so I would say he should step away from it until he has proper time testing on ovals." Harding Racing also returned to the series for the first time since the Indianapolis 500 with driver Gabby Chaves.

Scott Dixon of Chip Ganassi Racing entered the race leading the Drivers' Championship point standings with 303, while Hélio Castroneves and Takuma Sato followed in second and third with 295 and 292 respectively.

=== Practice and qualifying ===
Two practice sessions and qualifying were held on Friday, June 9. The first practice session took place in the afternoon and was delayed by rain. Dixon set the fastest lap time with his teammate Charlie Kimball and Alexander Rossi following in second and third. In qualifying, Kimball secured his first career pole position with a two-lap time of 46.5861 seconds (222.556 mph), in the process setting a new track record. His teammate Dixon qualified alongside him on the front row. Rossi, Tony Kanaan, and Vautier rounded out the top five. Carlos Muñoz, for the second race in a row, set no time, this time due to failing to reach tech inspection in time to be eligible to make a run, forcing him to start last again. In the post-qualifying practice session, Carpenter clocked the fastest single lap time (224.682 mph), ahead of Dixon and Rossi.

=== Race ===
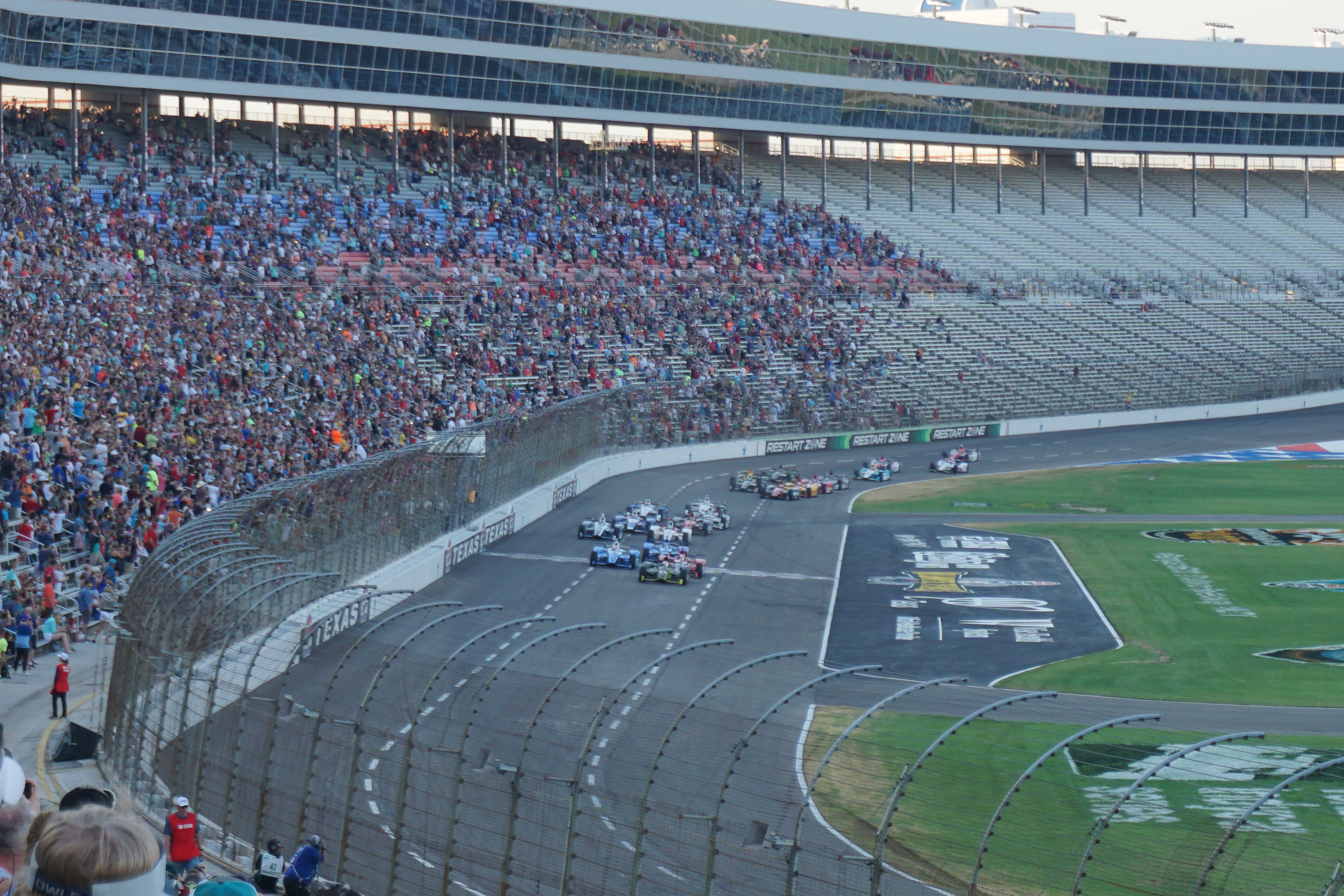
Start of the race

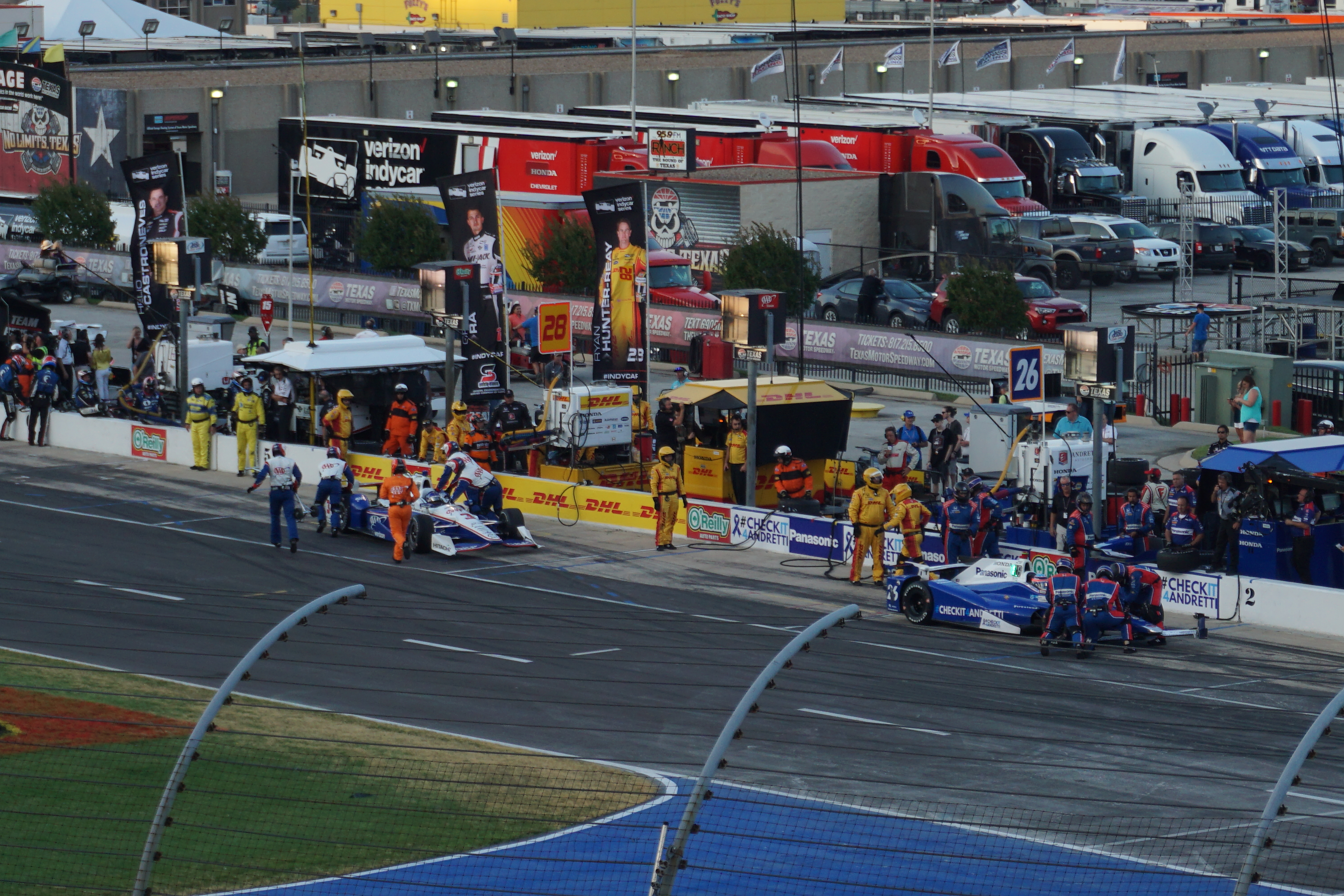
Hélio Castroneves and Takuma Sato after colliding in pit lane

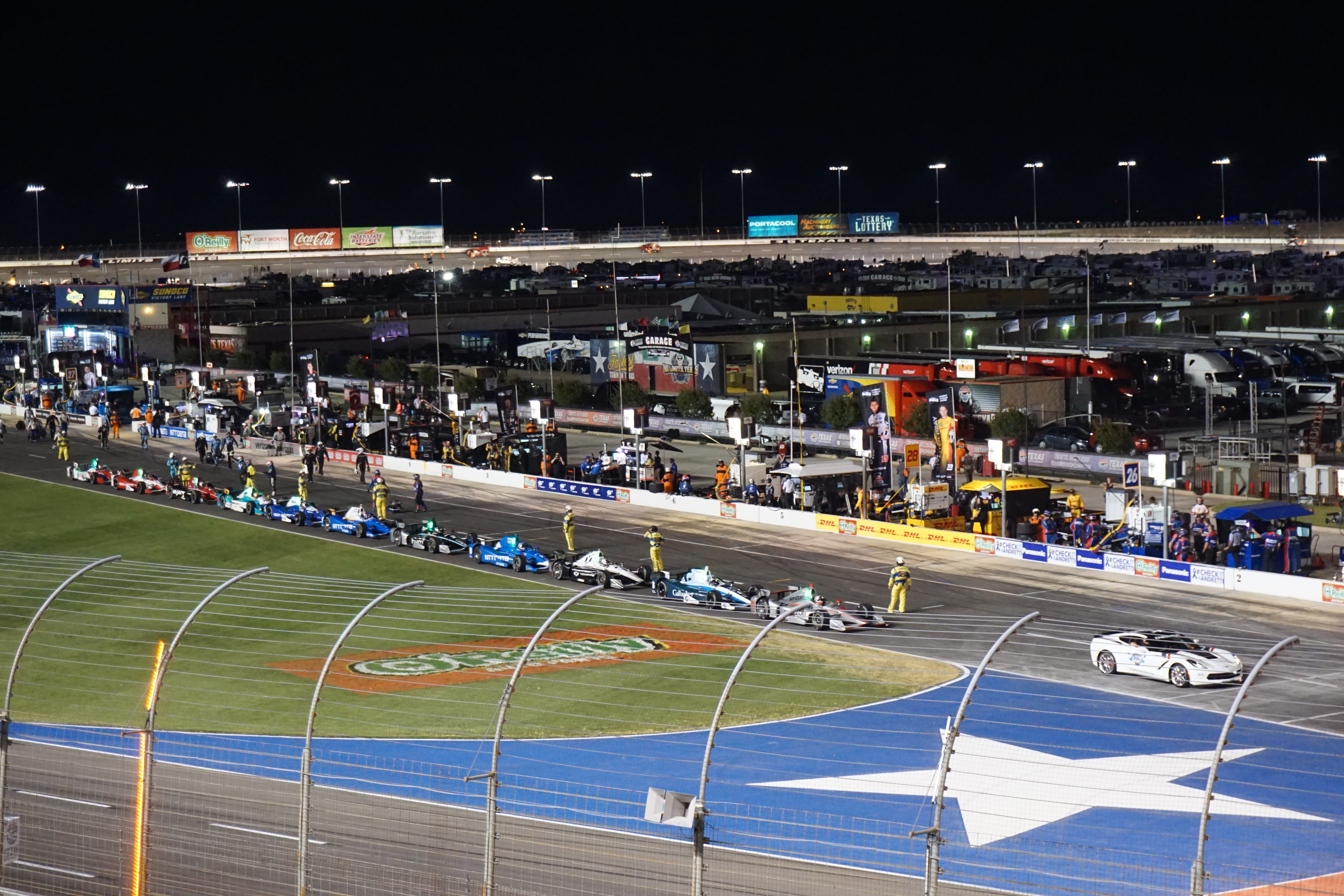
Cars on pit lane during the red flag

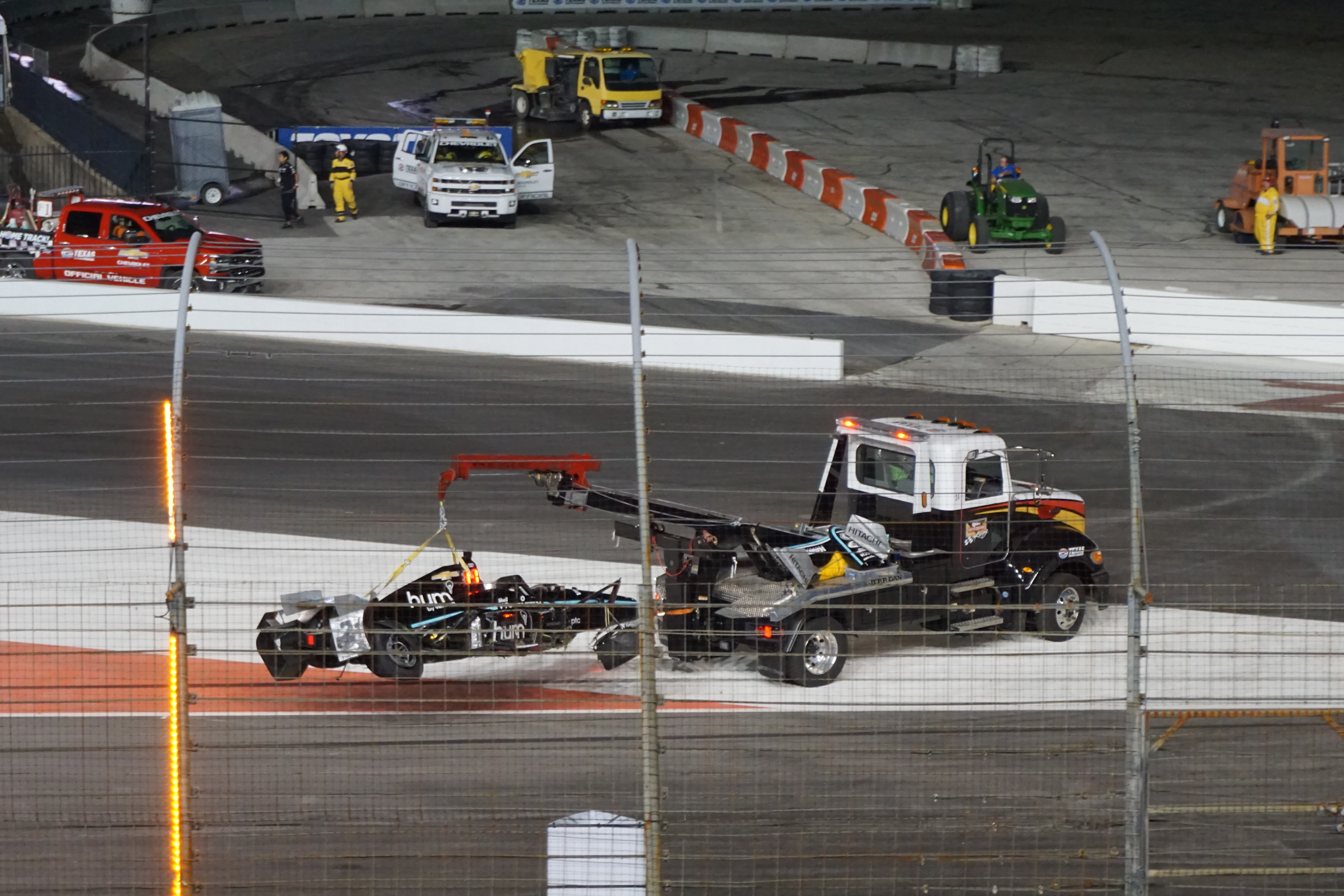
Josef Newgarden after crashing

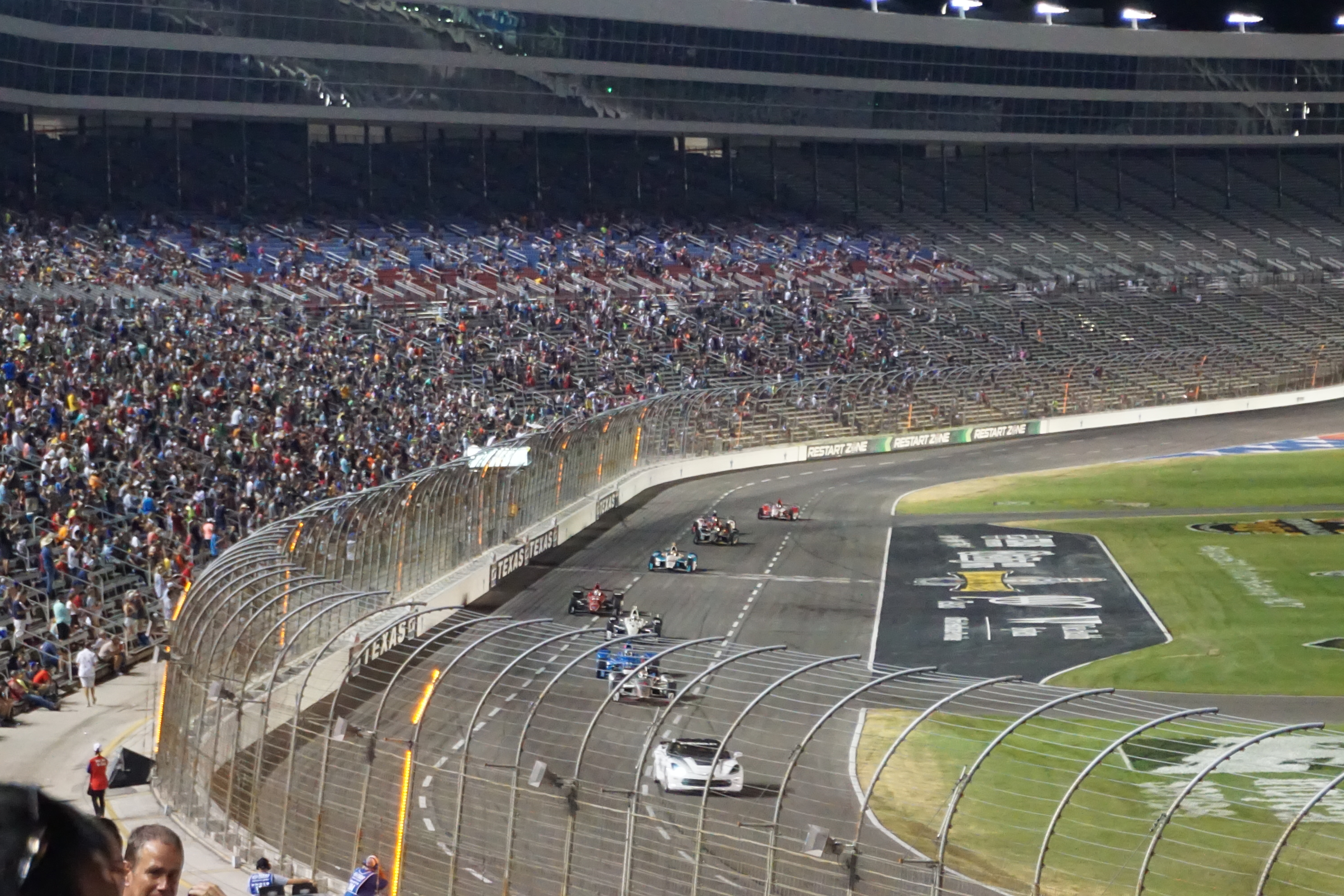
Will Power leading during a late caution

The race was held on Saturday, June 10. At the start, Kimball jumped into the lead of the race, with the top five positions staying the same. The top five remained the same drivers until around lap 20, when Team Penske drivers began working their way to the front of the field, including Josef Newgarden and Power. Up front, though, the battle for the lead was between Kimball and Vautier, with Vautier finally getting clear of Kimball on lap 29, as Newgarden, Power, and Ed Carpenter followed suit. Racing was interrupted by caution for the first time on lap 37, when Rossi lost control of his car and crashed in turn 3 after making contact with the Ganassi teammates Dixon and Kanaan. It was the first of many crashes during the night. During the caution, the field took the opportunity to make pit stops, with Newgarden winning the race of pit road ahead of Power and Vautier. As cars left the pit lane, James Hinchcliffe lost control of his car, causing him to spin and collect the cars of Castroneves and Sato, though all three were able to continue on after repairs. Kimball, after his strong start to the race, encountered mechanical issues during his pit stop and was forced to retire, leaving him with a 21st-place finish. The pit stops also saw a rash of penalties, as race leader Newgarden and J. R. Hildebrand were hit with pit-lane speeding penalties and Hinchcliffe was penalized for the incident he had caused. Once the chaos of the pit stops had finished, Power held the lead over Vautier, Dixon, Carpenter, and Simon Pagenaud.

Racing resumed on lap 48, with Power maintaining his lead despite attempts by both Vautier and Dixon to get around him. However, by lap 66, attacks on Power's lead began to dissipate as his teammate Pagenaud moved into second place. Behind them, Castroneves began to make a move toward the top of the field, moving into the top five only 10 laps later. During this stint, some drivers, most notably Newgarden, began suffering from tire blistering, causing concerns about tire durability. These concerns seemed to come to light on lap 91, when the right-front tire on Castroneves's car failed, causing him to crash heavily in Turn 2. Pit stops once again occurred, with Power maintaining his lead over Pagenaud, Dixon, Kanaan, and Mikhail Aleshin. During the caution, Hinchcliffe, Newgarden, and Sato were all able to get back onto the lead lap after losing it in the chaos of the first caution. Racing resumed on lap 103, but almost immediately the race went back under caution as Carpenter and Vautier touched, sending Carpenter into a spin in turn 1. This caution was very brief, and racing resumed on lap 108.

A lengthy green flag period followed the restart, with Power leading the way. Behind him, positions in the top five changed often, as Pagenaud, Dixon, Kanaan, Vautier, and Hildebrand battled for positions. On lap 139, caution flew again, this time for debris. The leaders once again took advantage of the caution to make pit stops, but Max Chilton elected to stay out, placing him in the lead of the race. On lap 149, racing resumed, with Chilton able to briefly hold his lead before Power once again moved past him to resume command of the race. On lap 152, Kanaan moved wide coming towards turn 3, making contact with Hinchcliffe, who had Aleshin outside of him. Hinchcliffe then spun, causing a large crash that took out himself, Aleshin, Carpenter, Hildebrand, Vautier, Ed Jones, Ryan Hunter-Reay, and Muñoz in an incident compared to The Big One at similar pack-racing NASCAR races. Carpenter and Hildebrand would eventually return to the race course, but several laps down. The incident forced the race to be red flagged to allow for clean-up. During the red flag, INDYCAR and Firestone officials, in response to continuing issues with blistering tires, elected to have competition caution periods and mandatory tire stops after 30 green flag laps for the remainder of the race. Also during the red flag period, officials assessed a stop and 20-second hold penalty to Kanaan for his role in the eight-car pileup, which, once the race restarted, put him two laps down.

After 30 minutes of clean-up, racing finally resumed on lap 159. The top four was a battle between Power, Pagenaud, Dixon, and Newgarden. However, Newgarden, who had been suffering the worst issues with blistering, pit two laps before the mandatory stops, placing him at the tail end of the field and, despite just changing tires, was still forced to change tires at the competition caution. During the mandatory stops, Dixon managed to get past Power, placing him in the lead, while Pagenaud, Sato, and Graham Rahal emerged behind them. During the caution, Kanaan managed to regain one of his laps, putting him only one lap behind the leaders.

Racing resumed once again on lap 198, where Power almost immediately moved back around Dixon to once again take the lead of the race. Caution came out again only three laps later, as Newgarden attempted to complete a three-wide pass in turn 3, which resulted in him hitting the wall in turn 4. Racing resumed on lap 210, with Power maintaining his lead, while second place became a battle between Pagenaud, Dixon, and Sato, with Dixon emerging ahead. This caution also put Kanaan back onto the lead lap. On lap 225, the final competition caution of the race came out, with the top five staying the same after the mandatory pit stops. The final restart of the race came at lap 229, with Dixon quickly moving to the outside of Power to challenge for the lead. The two switched the lead several times, while behind them, Pagenaud, Sato, Rahal, and Kanaan pulled up behind the duo and also began challenging for first. With five laps to go, Sato attempted to pass Dixon in the dogleg on the front-stretch, but clipped the grass, sending him into a spin and collecting Dixon and Chilton. Conor Daly also spun in the incident, but did not hit anything, though the incident caused him to drop a lap. Chilton was able to complete two more laps before heading into the pit lane. With so few laps left, the race ended under caution, with Power taking his second victory of the year and his second win at Texas Motor Speedway. Kanaan, despite his role in two incidents, came across the line in second, while Pagenaud took the final step of the podium. Only three other drivers finished on the lead lap; Rahal in fourth, Chaves in fifth, and Marco Andretti in sixth.

=== Post-race comments ===
Power was overjoyed to have earned the victory, saying, "Over the moon to win here. My second home and my wife [are] from here, so we spend a lot of time down here, so [it's] just an amazing feeling." Kanaan apologized for his role in causing the largest accident of the night: "I'm going to apologize to [Hinchcliffe] for what happened - I just got up a little too high. We paid the price for my mistake. We got a penalty, paid the penalty, and we were able to finish second. ... I'm not going to lie, I'm glad it's over." Pagenaud called the race, "a lot of fun. It got a little crazy at the end. I tell you, it is just incredible how close we can race against each other. Good fun, good night, awesome working with Will. That is Team Penske, we all work together, you guys don't believe us, but we do and we showed it tonight."

The race became controversial for being a pack race, which contributed to the size of the accidents that occurred. Power was unsurprised by the nature of the race, "I told the series...'This will be an absolute pack race.' I didn't say whether that was good or bad, but I absolutely knew it would be a pack race." Kanaan called on the series to change the style of racing to avoid pack races in the future: "I don't think we should be doing this the way it is. We should be coming to Texas. The fans are great. This track is awesome. But I think we should change the format a little bit. How? I don't know; we've got to figure it out." Dixon argued that additional testing could have prevented the pack racing from occurring.

Sébastien Bourdais, who was still recovering from injuries sustained in qualifying for the Indianapolis 500, described it as a "bullshit" race, explaining, "Back in the days, particularly when Dan Wheldon died, we told ourselves that we would never do that style of racing again. And actually, as far as I'm concerned, Texas last weekend is not even the first time we've done it since then. We’ve done it at Fontana in 2015 and in a couple of other places." However, he also maintained that he held no ill will against the speedway, saying, "It's got nothing to do with that track, and it's not any track owners' responsibility to define our racing for us. It’s down to us to bring the right package."

In the points standings, Dixon maintained the points lead, while Pagenaud moved back up to second place. Power, with his win, moved back into the top five after dropping out in the Detroit races.

== Results ==
Key	Meaning
R	Rookie
W	Past winner

=== Qualifying ===
Final qualifying classification
Pos	No.	Name	Lap 1 Time	Lap 2 Time	Total Time	Avg. Speed
1	83	(United States) Charlie Kimball	23.3131	23.2730	46.5861	222.556 mph (358.169 km/h)
2	9	(New Zealand) Scott Dixon W	23.3090	23.2854	46.5944	222.516 mph (358.105 km/h)
3	98	(United States) Alexander Rossi	23.3129	23.2969	46.6098	222.442 mph (357.986 km/h)
4	10	(Brazil) Tony Kanaan W	23.3444	23.3569	46.7013	222.007 mph (357.286 km/h)
5	18	(France) Tristan Vautier	23.3724	23.3721	46.7445	221.801 mph (356.954 km/h)
6	8	(United Kingdom) Max Chilton	23.4391	23.3365	46.7756	221.654 mph (356.718 km/h)
7	7	(Russia) Mikhail Aleshin	23.4168	23.3937	46.8105	221.489 mph (356.452 km/h)
8	26	(Japan) Takuma Sato	23.4254	23.3917	46.8171	221.458 mph (356.402 km/h)
9	12	(Australia) Will Power W	23.4551	23.4002	46.8553	221.277 mph (356.111 km/h)
10	3	(Brazil) Hélio Castroneves W	23.4549	23.4167	46.8716	221.200 mph (355.987 km/h)
11	15	(United States) Graham Rahal W	23.4656	23.4581	46.9237	220.954 mph (355.591 km/h)
12	1	(France) Simon Pagenaud	23.4861	23.4609	46.9470	220.845 mph (355.416 km/h)
13	28	(United States) Ryan Hunter-Reay	23.4881	23.4883	46.9764	220.707 mph (355.193 km/h)
14	20	(United States) Ed Carpenter W	23.5503	23.4728	47.0231	220.487 mph (354.839 km/h)
15	27	(United States) Marco Andretti	23.6220	23.4373	47.0593	220.318 mph (354.567 km/h)
16	5	(Canada) James Hinchcliffe	23.5912	23.5352	47.1264	220.004 mph (354.062 km/h)
17	2	(United States) Josef Newgarden	23.5776	23.5611	47.1387	219.947 mph (353.970 km/h)
18	21	(United States) J. R. Hildebrand	23.7018	23.6494	47.3512	218.960 mph (352.382 km/h)
19	19	(United Arab Emirates) Ed Jones R	23.8529	23.8566	47.7095	217.315 mph (349.735 km/h)
20	88	(Colombia) Gabby Chaves	24.0515	24.0461	48.0976	215.562 mph (346.913 km/h)
21	4	(United States) Conor Daly	24.0886	24.0180	48.1066	215.521 mph (346.847 km/h)
22	14	(Colombia) Carlos Muñoz	–	–	No Time	No Speed

=== Race ===
Final race classification
Pos	No.	Driver	Team	Engine	Laps	Time/Retired^{1}	Pit Stops	Grid	Laps Led	Pts.^{2}
1	12	(Australia) Will Power W	Team Penske	Chevrolet	248	2:32:31.0118	9	9	180	53
2	10	(Brazil) Tony Kanaan W	Chip Ganassi Racing	Honda	248	+0.1978	10	4	1	41
3	1	(France) Simon Pagenaud	Team Penske	Chevrolet	248	+0.3740	9	12		35
4	15	(United States) Graham Rahal W	Rahal Letterman Lanigan Racing	Honda	248	+0.8112	11	11		32
5	88	(Colombia) Gabby Chaves	Harding Racing	Chevrolet	248	+1.8984	9	20		30
6	27	(United States) Marco Andretti	Andretti Autosport	Honda	248	+4.1632	12	15		28
7	4	(United States) Conor Daly	A. J. Foyt Enterprises	Chevrolet	247	+1 Lap	10	21		26
8	8	(United Kingdom) Max Chilton	Chip Ganassi Racing	Honda	245	+3 Laps	10	6	8	25
9	9	(New Zealand) Scott Dixon W	Chip Ganassi Racing	Honda	243	Contact	9	2	12	23
10	26	(Japan) Takuma Sato	Andretti Autosport	Honda	243	Contact	12	8		20
11	20	(United States) Ed Carpenter W	Ed Carpenter Racing	Chevrolet	224	Contact	11	14		19
12	21	(United States) J. R. Hildebrand	Ed Carpenter Racing	Chevrolet	215	+33 Laps	9	18		18
13	2	(United States) Josef Newgarden	Team Penske	Chevrolet	201	Contact	10	17	6	18
14	5	(Canada) James Hinchcliffe	Schmidt Peterson Motorsports	Honda	151	Contact	4	16		16
15	7	(Russia) Mikhail Aleshin	Schmidt Peterson Motorsports	Honda	151	Contact	3	7		15
16	18	(France) Tristan Vautier	Dale Coyne Racing	Honda	151	Contact	3	5	15	15
17	19	(United Arab Emirates) Ed Jones R	Dale Coyne Racing	Honda	151	Contact	3	19		13
18	14	(Colombia) Carlos Muñoz	A. J. Foyt Enterprises	Chevrolet	151	Contact	3	22		12
19	28	(United States) Ryan Hunter-Reay	Andretti Autosport	Honda	151	Contact	3	13		11
20	3	(Brazil) Hélio Castroneves W	Team Penske	Chevrolet	90	Contact	5	10		10
21	83	(United States) Charlie Kimball	Chip Ganassi Racing	Honda	41	Mechanical	0	1	26	11
22	98	(United States) Alexander Rossi	Andretti Herta Autosport	Honda	36	Contact	0	3		8

^{1} Race finished under caution.

^{2} Points include one point for leading at least one lap during a race, an additional two points for leading the most race laps, and one point for Pole Position.

== Standings after the race ==
Drivers' Championship standings
Rank	+/–	Driver	Points
1		(New Zealand) Scott Dixon	326
2	2	(France) Simon Pagenaud	313
3		(Japan) Takuma Sato	312
4	2	(Brazil) Hélio Castroneves	305
5	3	(Australia) Will Power	286

- Note: Only the top five positions are included.

Previous race: 2017 Chevrolet Detroit Grand Prix	IndyCar Series; 2017 season	Next race: 2017 Kohler Grand Prix
Previous race: 2016 Firestone 600	Rainguard Water Sealers 600	Next race: 2018 DXC Technology 600
