= 2016 Kohler Grand Prix =

(United States) 2016 Road America
Race details
9th round of the 2016 IndyCar Series season
← Previous race	Next race →
- Date: June 26, 2016
- Official name: Kohler Grand Prix
- Location: Road America
- Course: Permanent racing facility 4.014 mi / 6.458 km
- Distance: 50 laps 200.7 mi / 322.9 km

Pole position
- Driver: (Australia) Will Power (Team Penske)
- Time: 1:42.2105

Fastest lap
- Driver: (United Kingdom) Max Chilton (Chip Ganassi Racing)
- Time: 1:44.1196 (on lap 45 of 50)

Podium
- First: (Australia) Will Power (Team Penske)
- Second: (Brazil) Tony Kanaan (Chip Ganassi Racing)
- Third: (United States) Graham Rahal (Rahal Letterman Lanigan Racing)

The 2016 Kohler Grand Prix was the 9th round of the 2016 IndyCar Series. The event took place over 50 laps around Road America in Elkhart Lake, Wisconsin. The race was the first for IndyCars at the circuit since 2007 during the final season of the Champ Car World Series. It was the 26th time that the circuit had been used for IndyCar racing.

Prior to the race weekend, doubts surrounded whether Josef Newgarden would be able to race due to injuries sustained during the 2016 Firestone 600. However, he was cleared by doctors to participate in opening practice and, later, for all sessions of the grand prix. In qualifying, Will Power went fastest, setting a time of 1:42.2105 to beat out Scott Dixon and Tony Kanaan. Championship leader Simon Pagenaud qualified fourth. Josef Newgarden and James Hinchcliffe both lost their two fastest times of their sessions, Newgarden for bringing out a red flag after spinning in turn 9 and Hinchcliffe for impeding the laps of Juan Pablo Montoya and Alexander Rossi. They started 20th and 22nd respectively.

At the start of the race, the first four positions remained as they qualified, while Graham Rahal moved up into fifth. In the rear of the field, Jack Hawksworth spun in turn five, moving him to the back of the field. Sébastien Bourdais came into the pits with damage to the rear wing assembly at the end of the first lap, putting him a lap down and ending his chances of taking victory. On lap 7, Scott Dixon pulled off course and rolled to a halt in turn five with engine failure, leaving him with a last place finish. With Dixon gone, Will Power was free to extend his lead over Tony Kanaan before the first round of pit stops. At the first round of stops, Power easily emerged back in the lead, but Kanaan was challenged by Graham Rahal for second place. The running order remained largely the same through the second round of pit stops, though Rahal would briefly pull into second after a quick pit stop before Kanaan passed him again later in the lap. However, both would fall back as Simon Pagenaud, on red tires, charged past both to move into second. As the race approached lap 40, the last round of pit stops came, with the running order remaining Power, Pagenaud, Kanaan, Rahal.

On lap 40, the race's only caution period came out after the rear suspension on Conor Daly's car failed, sending him off course and into the wall in turn one. This bunched the field up for a shootout to the end of the race. On the restart on lap 44, Power held his lead, while Tony Kanaan moved past Simon Pagenaud into second. In a repeat of the Indianapolis 500, Pagenaud reported that his engine had developed a misfire, causing him to drop quickly down the running order. At the front of the race, Kanaan was able to close the gap to Power down to only half a second by the final lap. However, Power had conserved most of his push-to-pass presses, allowing him to use them for most of the final lap and hold of Kanaan for the victory. Power's win was his second consecutive win and his 27th career victory, tying him for 13th with Johnny Rutherford for most career IndyCar victories. The victory also put Power in serious contention for the championship despite missing the first race of the season. Kanaan's second was his first podium finish since the previous season's race at Auto Club Speedway. Graham Rahal completed the podium as the highest finishing Honda driver in the race. Pagenaud's engine issue plummeted him all the way down the order to 13th, turning what seemed like a huge points day with Scott Dixon's engine failure into only a small gain. The highest finishing rookie of the race was Spencer Pigot, who came across the line in ninth. Josef Newgarden, despite his injuries, managed to finish in eighth place.

== Report ==
Key	Meaning
R	Rookie
W	Past winner

=== Qualifying ===
Pos	No.	Name	Grp.	Round 1	Round 2	Round 3
1	12	(Australia) Will Power	2	1:44.0025	1:42.4430	1:42.2105
2	9	(New Zealand) Scott Dixon	1	1:42.4888	1:42.1451	1:42.3759
3	10	(Brazil) Tony Kanaan	2	1:43.5253	1:42.4093	1:42.7279
4	22	(France) Simon Pagenaud	2	1:44.2585	1:42.4142	1:42.8573
5	3	(Brazil) Hélio Castroneves	1	1:42.8944	1:42.5556	1:42.9449
6	15	(United States) Graham Rahal	1	1:43.1585	1:42.5540	1:43.7782
7	8	(United Kingdom) Max Chilton R	1	1:43.1957	1:42.7519	
8	28	(United States) Ryan Hunter-Reay	1	1:42.9735	1:42.8318	
9	18	(United States) Conor Daly R	2	1:43.4693	1:43.1073	
10	26	(Colombia) Carlos Muñoz	1	1:43.1519	1:43.2001	
11	83	(United States) Charlie Kimball	2	1:43.7253	1:43.2649	
12	11	(France) Sébastien Bourdais W	2	1:43.8669	1:43.3291	
13	7	(Russia) Mikhail Aleshin	1	1:43.4024		
14	2	(Colombia) Juan Pablo Montoya	2	1:44.3570		
15	14	(Japan) Takuma Sato	1	1:43.5357		
16	98	(United States) Alexander Rossi R	2	1:45.0840		
17	20	(United States) Spencer Pigot R	1	1:43.6432		
18	41	(United Kingdom) Jack Hawksworth	2	1:45.5110		
19	19	(Colombia) Gabby Chaves	1	1:43.6672		
20	21	(United States) Josef Newgarden	2	4:19.1862		
21	27	(United States) Marco Andretti	1	1:43.7289		
22	5	(Canada) James Hinchcliffe	2	4:29.0408		
OFFICIAL BOX SCORE

Source for individual rounds:

=== Race results ===
Pos	No.	Driver	Team	Engine	Laps	Time/Retired	Pit Stops	Grid	Laps Led	Pts.^{1}
1	12	(Australia) Will Power	Team Penske	Chevrolet	50	1:39:10.3044	3	1	46	54
2	10	(Brazil) Tony Kanaan	Chip Ganassi Racing	Chevrolet	50	+0.7429	3	3		40
3	15	(United States) Graham Rahal	Rahal Letterman Lanigan Racing	Honda	50	+5.9608	3	6	2	36
4	28	(United States) Ryan Hunter-Reay	Andretti Autosport	Honda	50	+9.3597	3	8		32
5	3	(Brazil) Hélio Castroneves	Team Penske	Chevrolet	50	+10.5340	3	5		30
6	83	(United States) Charlie Kimball	Chip Ganassi Racing	Chevrolet	50	+10.9966	3	11		28
7	2	(Colombia) Juan Pablo Montoya	Team Penske	Chevrolet	50	+12.6191	3	14		26
8	21	(United States) Josef Newgarden	Ed Carpenter Racing	Chevrolet	50	+13.8835	3	20		24
9	20	(United States) Spencer Pigot R	Ed Carpenter Racing	Chevrolet	50	+15.7290	3	17		22
10	26	(Colombia) Carlos Muñoz	Andretti Autosport	Honda	50	+17.1132	3	10		20
11	41	(United Kingdom) Jack Hawksworth	A. J. Foyt Enterprises	Honda	50	+18.7152	4	18		19
12	27	(United States) Marco Andretti	Andretti Autosport	Honda	50	+19.9030	4	21		18
13	22	(France) Simon Pagenaud	Team Penske	Chevrolet	50	+21.1530	3	4	2	18
14	5	(Canada) James Hinchcliffe	Schmidt Peterson Motorsports	Honda	50	+22.1333	4	22		16
15	98	(United States) Alexander Rossi R	Andretti Herta Autosport	Honda	50	+22.5908	4	16		15
16	7	(Russia) Mikhail Aleshin	Schmidt Peterson Motorsports	Honda	50	+23.5531	3	13		14
17	14	(Japan) Takuma Sato	A. J. Foyt Enterprises	Honda	50	+35.3665	5	15		13
18	11	(France) Sébastien Bourdais W	KVSH Racing	Chevrolet	49	+1 Lap	4	12		12
19	19	(Colombia) Gabby Chaves	Dale Coyne Racing	Honda	49	+1 Lap	6	19		11
20	8	(United Kingdom) Max Chilton R	Chip Ganassi Racing	Chevrolet	48	+2 Laps	3	7		10
21	18	(United States) Conor Daly R	Dale Coyne Racing	Honda	39	Contact	3	9		9
22	9	(New Zealand) Scott Dixon	Chip Ganassi Racing	Chevrolet	6	Engine	0	2		8
OFFICIAL BOX SCORE

Notes

^{1} Points include 1 point for leading at least 1 lap during a race, an additional 2 points for leading the most race laps, and 1 point for Pole Position.

Source for time gaps:

== Championship standings after the race ==
Drivers' Championship standings

	Pos	Driver	Points
	1	(France) Simon Pagenaud	375
1	2	(Brazil) Hélio Castroneves	301
4	3	(Australia) Will Power	294
2	4	(New Zealand) Scott Dixon	285
1	5	(United States) Josef Newgarden	283

- Note: Only the top five positions are included.

Previous race: 2016 Chevrolet Dual in Detroit	IndyCar Series; 2016 season	Next race: 2016 Iowa Corn 300
Previous race: 2007 Generac Grand Prix	Kohler Grand Prix	Next race: 2017 Kohler Grand Prix
