= 2014 Grand Prix of Houston =

Track map of Reliant Park

The 2014 Shell and Pennzoil Grand Prix of Houston was the second doubleheader of the 2014 season, hosting Rounds 9 and 10 of the 2014 IndyCar Series season. Carlos Huertas won Race 1, ahead of Juan Pablo Montoya, and Carlos Muñoz. As of 2025, this was the only time in IndyCar where of top-three drivers from Colombia held a sweep of the podium; a first for any top-line motorsport series. Simon Pagenaud won the second race, ahead of Mikhail Aleshin and Jack Hawksworth

== Classification ==
=== Qualifying 1 ===
Pos.	Driver	Team	Vehicle	Group 1	Group 2	Top 12	FF6	Grid Start
1	(France) Simon Pagenaud	(United States) Schmidt Peterson Motorsports	Dallara-Honda	0:59,8408	—	0:59,4010	0:59,3716	1
2	(Brazil) Hélio Castroneves	(United States) Team Penske	Dallara-Chevrolet	0:59,8644	—	0:59,2970	0:59,4463	2
3	(New Zealand) Scott Dixon	(United States) Target Chip Ganassi Racing	Dallara-Chevrolet	1:00,0849	—	0:59,3276	0:59,5034	3
4	(Italy) Luca Filippi	(United States) Rahal Letterman Lanigan Racing	Dallara-Honda	—	0:59,6560	0:59,3399	0:59,5523	4
5	(Canada) James Hinchcliffe	(United States) Andretti Autosport	Dallara-Honda	0:59,9397	—	0:59,2951	0:59,6528	5
6	(Japan) Takuma Satō	(United States) A. J. Foyt Enterprises	Dallara-Honda	—	0:59,6408	0:59,2248	1:00,4037	6
7	(United Kingdom) Justin Wilson	(United States) Dale Coyne Racing	Dallara-Honda	—	1:00,1406	0:59,4245	—	7
8	(United States) Ryan Hunter-Reay	(United States) Andretti Autosport	Dallara-Honda	1:00,0066	—	0:59,5107	—	8
9	(France) Sébastien Bourdais	(United States) KVSH Racing	Dallara-Chevrolet	1:00,0572	—	0:59,6126	—	9
10	(Russia) Mikhail Aleshin	(United States) Schmidt Peterson Motorsports	Dallara-Honda	—	1:00,1713	0:59,7003	—	10
11	(Colombia) Juan Pablo Montoya	(United States) Penske Motorsports	Dallara-Chevrolet	—	1:00,1241	0:59,9649	—	11
12	(United States) Josef Newgarden	(United States) Sarah Fisher Hartman Racing	Dallara-Honda	—	0:59,7711	1:00,0312	—	12
13	(United States) Charlie Kimball	(United States) Chip Ganassi Racing Teams	Dallara-Honda	1:00,1291	—	—	—	13
14	(United States) Graham Rahal	(United States) Rahal Letterman Lanigan Racing	Dallara-Honda	—	1:00,2491	—	—	14
15	(Australia) Ryan Briscoe	(United States) NTT Data Chip Ganassi Racing	Dallara-Chevrolet	1:00,2124	—	—	—	15
16	(United States) Marco Andretti	(United States) Andretti Autosport	Dallara-Honda	—	1:00,3295	—	—	16
17	(United Kingdom) Mike Conway	(United States) Ed Carpenter Racing	Dallara-Chevrolet	1:00,2358	—	—	—	17
18	(Australia) Will Power	(United States) Team Penske	Dallara-Chevrolet	—	1:00,3670	—	—	18
19	(Colombia) Carlos Huertas	(United States) Dale Coyne Racing	Dallara-Honda	1:00,3106	—	—	—	19
20	(Colombia) Sebastian Saavedra	(United States) KV AFS Racing	Dallara-Chevrolet	—	1:00,4224	—	—	20
21	(United Kingdom) Jack Hawksworth	(United States) BHA/BBM with Curb Agajanian	Dallara-Honda	1:00,4203	—	—	—	21
22	(Brazil) Tony Kanaan	(United States) Target Chip Ganassi Racing	Dallara-Chevrolet	—	1:00,6919	—	—	22
23	(Colombia) Carlos Muñoz	(United States) Andretti – HVM	Dallara-Honda	1:00,4734	—	—	—	23

=== Race 1 ===
Pos.	Driver	Team	Chasis	Laps	Time	Grid Pos.	Leading Laps
1	(Colombia) Carlos Huertas	(United States) Dale Coyne Racing	Dallara-Honda	80	1:51:25,5649	19	7
2	(Colombia) Juan Pablo Montoya	(United States) Team Penske	Dallara-Chevrolet	80	+ 0,0975	11	0
3	(Colombia) Carlos Muñoz	(United States) Andretti – HVM	Dallara-Honda	80	+ 2,3433	23	0
4	France	United States	Dallara-Chevrolet	80	+ 3,0878	9	0
5	Canada	United States	Dallara-Honda	80	+ 4,7101	5	32
6	United Kingdom	United States	Dallara-Honda	80	+ 5,5127	21	0
7	United States	United States	Dallara-Honda	80	+ 6,2853	8	0
8	United States	United States	Dallara-Honda	80	+ 7,1638	16	0
9	Brazil	United States	Dallara-Chevrolet	80	+ 8,2181	2	0
10	United Kingdom	United States	Dallara-Honda	80	+ 9,4366	7	15
11	United States	United States	Dallara-Honda	80	+ 30,8792	14	0
12	Australia	United States	Dallara-Chevrolet	80	+ 33,2884	15	0
13	Brazil	United States	Dallara-Chevrolet	80	+ 35,0789	22	0
14	Australia	United States	Dallara-Chevrolet	79	+ 1 Lap	18	0
15	Colombia	United States	Dallara-Chevrolet	79	+ 1 Lap	20	0
16	France	United States	Dallara-Honda	74	+ 6 Laps	1	4
17	United Kingdom	United States	Dallara-Chevrolet	55	DNF	17	0
18	United States	United States	Dallara-Honda	54	DNF	13	0
19	New Zealand	United States	Dallara-Chevrolet	46	DNF	3	0
20	United States	United States	Dallara-Honda	41	DNF	12	0
21	Italy	United States	Dallara-Honda	36	DNF	4	0
22	Japan	United States	Dallara-Honda	32	DNF	6	22
23	Russia	United States	Dallara-Honda	31	DNF	10	0

Quellen:

==== Leaders of Race 1 ====
Section	Laps	Driver
1	1–4	(France) Simon Pagenaud
2	5–26	(Japan) Takuma Satō
3	27	(Canada) James Hinchcliffe
4	28	(United Kingdom) Justin Wilson
5	29–59	(Canada) James Hinchcliffe
6	60–73	(United Kingdom) Justin Wilson
7	74–80	(Colombia) Carlos Huertas

==== Yellow Flags ====
N.	Laps	Sector	Reason
1	29–31	3	Contact: Mike Conway (#20) in Turn 3
2	33–36	4	Contact: Mikhail Aleshin (#7) and Takuma Satō (#14) in Turn 6
3	37–41	5	Contact: Luca Filippi (#16) on the Start-Finish straight
4	48–52	5	Contact: Scott Dixon (#9), Charlie Kimball (#83) and Simon Pagenaud (#77) in Turn 9
5	58–60	3	Contact: Will Power (#12) in Turn 9
6	77–80	4	Contact: Sebastian Saavedra (#17) in Turn 5

Quellen:

Previous race: 2014 Firestone 600	Verizon IndyCar Series; 2014 season	Next race: 2014 Pocono IndyCar 500
Previous race: 2013 Shell-Pennzoil Grand Prix of Houston	Grand Prix of Houston	Next race: None
