= Charlie Kimball =

American racing driver

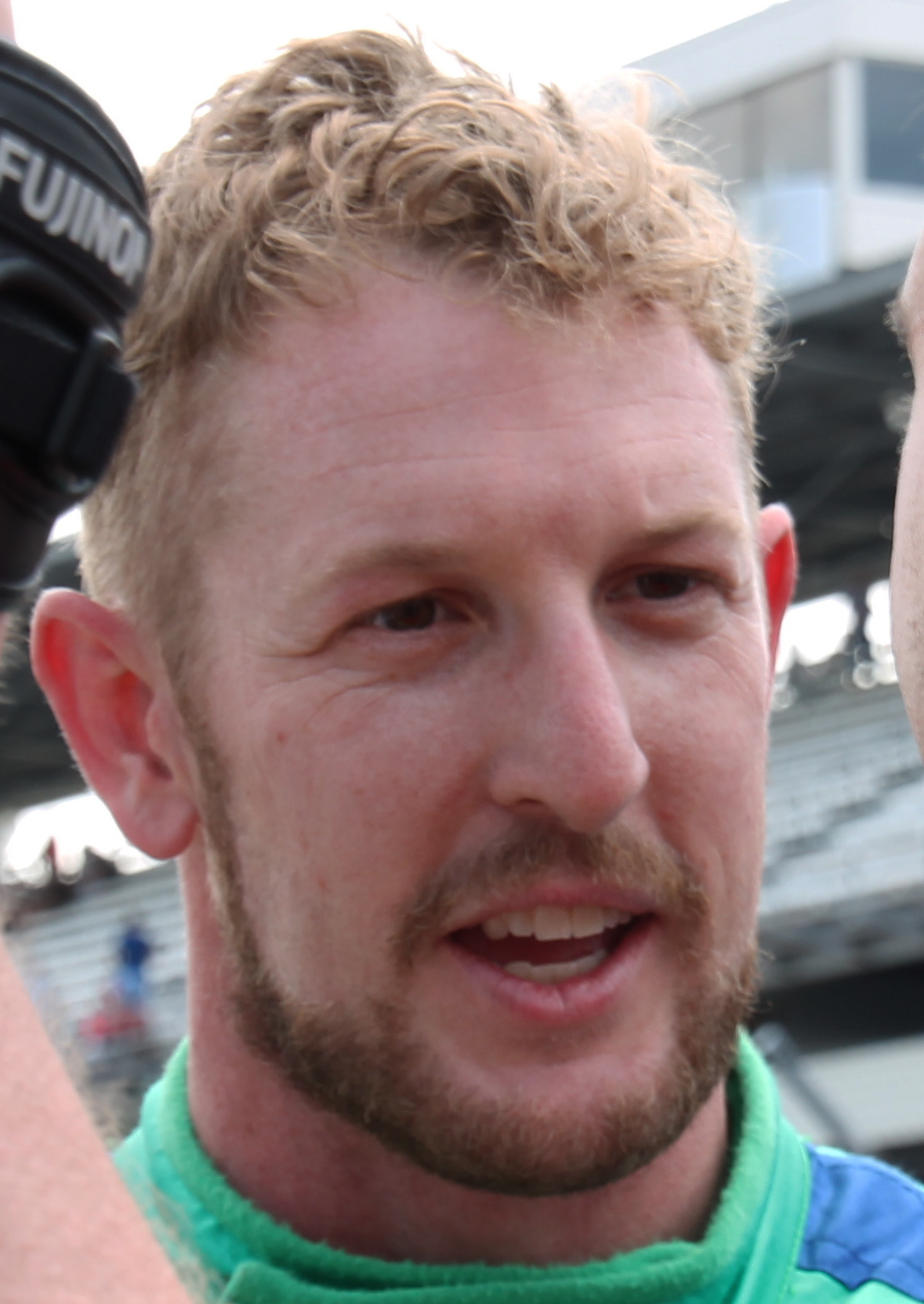
- Kimball during Carb Day at the 2015 Indianapolis 500
- Nationality: (United States) American
- Born: Charles Newton Kimball; February 20, 1985 (age 41); Chertsey, Surrey, England

IndyCar Series career
- 157 races run over 10 years
- Team: No. 4 (A. J. Foyt Enterprises)
- 2019 position: 25th
- Best finish: 9th (2013, 2016)
- First race: 2011 Honda Grand Prix of St. Petersburg (St. Petersburg)
- Last race: 2021 Acura Grand Prix of Long Beach (Long Beach)
- First win: 2013 Honda Indy 200 at Mid-Ohio (Mid-Ohio)
Wins	Podiums	Poles
1	6	1

Previous series
- 2009–10 2008–09 2006, 2008 2007 2005 2004 2003 2002: Indy Lights; A1 Grand Prix; Formula 3 Euro Series; Formula Renault 3.5 Series; British Formula Three; British Formula Ford; US Formula Ford; Formula Dodge

Awards
- 2003: Team USA Scholarship

Charles Newton Kimball (born February 20, 1985) is an American former race car driver who most recently competed in the IndyCar Series with A. J. Foyt Enterprises. He has scored a win, six podiums, and 13 top-fives during his IndyCar career. His best season results were ninth in 2013 and 2016. In addition, he won the 2013 24 Hours of Daytona.

== Career ==
=== 2002–2005 ===
Born in Chertsey, England, Kimball's single-seater career started in 2002 when he took part in the American Formula Dodge national championship, finishing the season in tenth place overall. He also won three races in the SCCA Formula Ford series. For 2003, he moved up to Formula Ford US, finishing third overall with two race wins and seven podium finishes. He also contested the UK Formula Ford winter series, taking one race win to finish third overall.

In 2004, Kimball competed in the full UK Formula Ford championship for Team JLR, taking two race wins and eleven podiums on his way to fourth in the championship. In the end-of-season Formula Ford Festival at Brands Hatch he finished in eighth place. His performances earned him a drive with front runners Carlin Motorsport in the 2005 British Formula 3 Championship, where he took five race wins to finish an impressive second behind teammate Álvaro Parente. He also finished twelfth in the Marlboro Masters at Zandvoort, but failed to finish the season-ending Macau Grand Prix.

=== 2006–2008 ===
For 2006, Kimball stayed in Formula Three, but moved up to the Formula 3 Euro Series with the French Signature-Plus team. He took one race win and three podiums to finish the season in eleventh place. Once again, he took part in the Masters Formula 3 race at Zandvoort and the Macau Grand Prix, finishing in ninth and 21st places respectively.

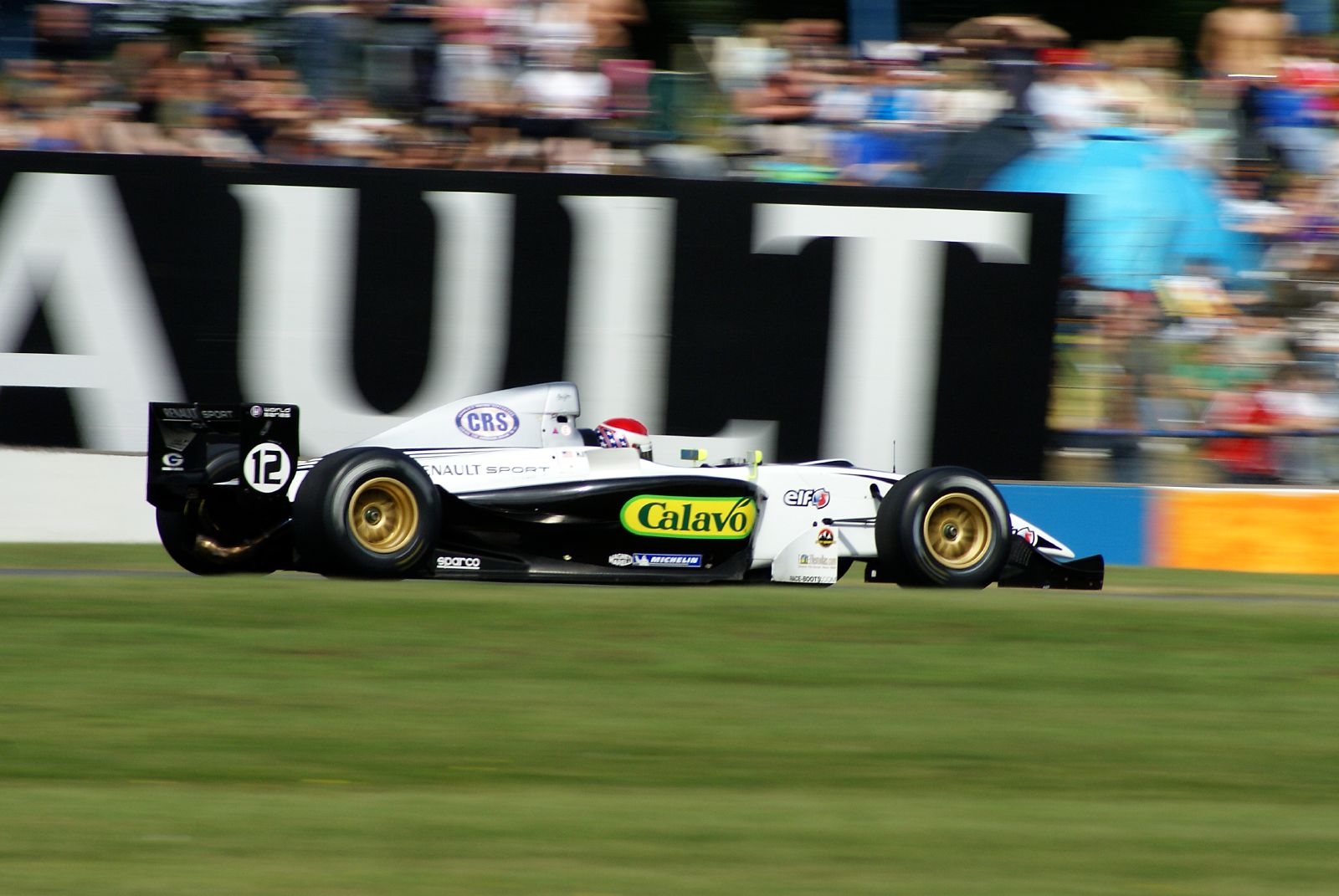
Kimball driving for Victory Engineering in the Donington Park round of the 2007 Formula Renault 3.5 Series season

In 2007, Kimball competed in the Formula Renault 3.5 Series for the Italian Victory Engineering team, alongside Dutchman Giedo van der Garde. He competed in twelve races (leaving the series with two race weekends remaining) and finished 24th in points with a best finish of eighth in the Monza and Nurburgring sprint races. His departed the team due to the onset of Type 1 diabetes which required hospitalization. As part of his ongoing treatment he wears a wireless blood sugar monitor and carries sugar water on board the car while racing. In 2008, he returned to F3 EuroSeries for six races with Prema Powerteam. Late in 2008, he competed in the first round of the A1 Grand Prix series for A1 Team USA.

=== Firestone Indy Lights (2009–2010) ===
For 2009, Kimball signed to drive in Indy Lights for the new Team PBIR outfit. He stated that an influencing factor in his return to the U.S. is to increase Diabetes awareness in his home country. Kimball finished tenth in points with a best finish of fourth at Watkins Glen International.

Kimball returned to Indy Lights in 2010 and signed with AFS Racing/Andretti Autosport. Despite not winning a race or pole, Kimball had four second-place finishes on the season and captured fourth in points, one spot behind his teammate Martin Plowman.

=== IndyCar Series (2011–2021) ===
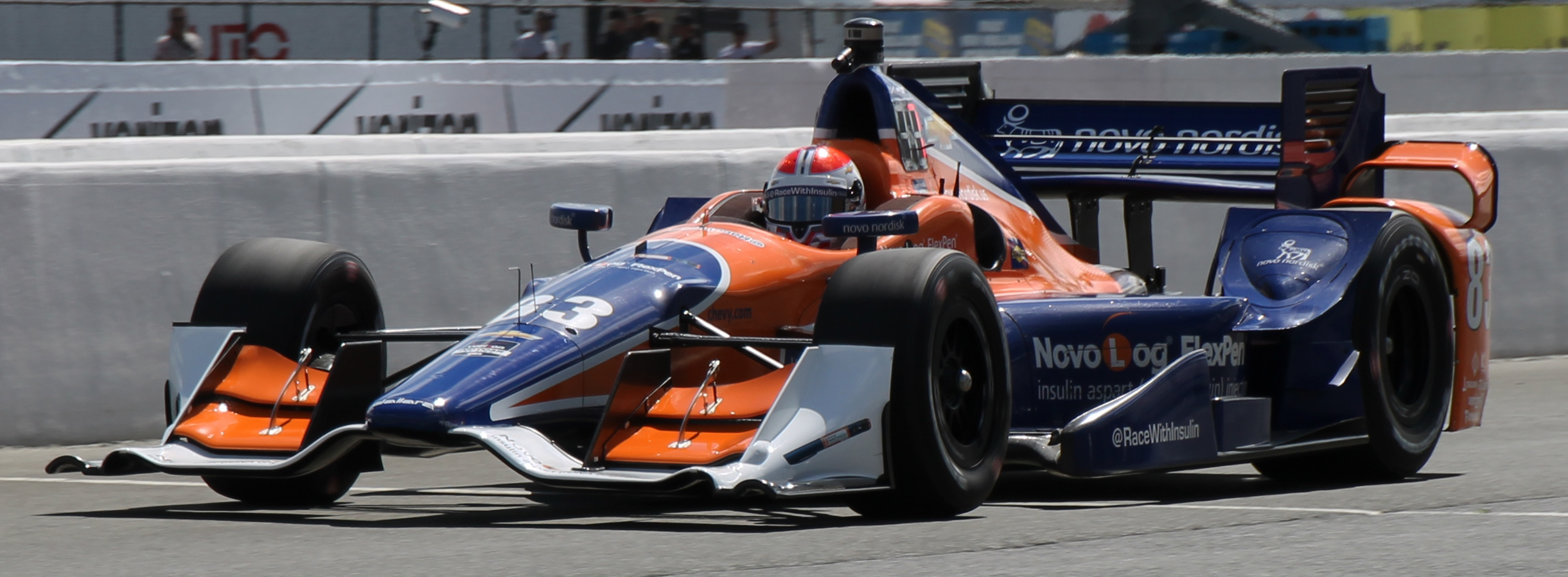
Kimball driving the Novo Nordisk Ganassi car at the 2015 GoPro Grand Prix of Sonoma

It was announced on December 16, 2010, that Kimball would move up to the IndyCar Series in 2011, in which he would drive the No. 83 entry for Chip Ganassi Racing. Kimball finished nineteenth in points with a best finish of ninth at the New Hampshire Motor Speedway.

Kimball returned to the team in 2012 and again finished nineteenth in points despite missing a race due to injury. He finished second at the Honda Indy Toronto, his first career podium finish. Kimball won his first IndyCar race on August 4, 2013, at the Honda Indy 200 at Mid-Ohio. He also finished second at Pocono and fourth at Barber and ranked ninth in points. In 2013, he competed in his first 24 Hours of Daytona race with Ganassi and was on the race-winning team with co-drivers Juan Pablo Montoya, Scott Pruett, and Memo Rojas.

In the 2014 IndyCar season, Kimball scored four top-five finishes and placed ninth in points. In 2015, he finished third at the Indianapolis 500 and the Grand Prix of Sonoma, and finished fifth at the Grand Prix of Indianapolis. The driver finished fifth at both Indianapolis races and got eleven top-fives in sixteen races, which earned him a ninth overall position in 2016. He scored no top-fives in 2017, and he parted with Ganassi afterward.

Carlin signed Kimball for the 2018 season. He got a fifth-place finish at Toronto and collected six top-tens. Kimball ran part-time in 2019, scoring two tenth-place finishes. He joined A. J. Foyt Enterprises in 2020, where he scored two top-tens. In 2021, Kimball failed to qualify for the Indy 500 for the first time in his career.

== Personal life ==
Kimball was born in England but grew up in Camarillo, California. His father Gordon was a designer of Formula One and Indy cars.

At the age of 22, Kimball was diagnosed with type 1 diabetes and was forced to abandon his racing program midseason. Undeterred, he climbed back into the cockpit the following year and claimed a podium finish in his first race after returning. He is also the first licensed driver with diabetes in the history of IndyCar racing (Howdy Wilcox hid the fact he was driving with diabetes in the 1932 Indy 500 but was barred from competing when officials found out before the 1933 race). Novo Nordisk, the manufacturer of the insulin Kimball uses, became a full-time sponsor of his racing program in 2011.

Kimball married Kathleen, whom he first met in high school, in 2014, the wedding officiated by fellow driver James Hinchcliffe. The couple relocated to Indianapolis, where they live with two dogs. Kathleen earned her MBA from Indiana University Kelley School of Business, and works at Kimball Marketing Group.

Kimball is a long-time fan of the Los Angeles Dodgers baseball team.

== Racing record ==
=== Complete Formula 3 Euro Series results ===
(key)

Year	Entrant	Chassis	Engine	1	2	3	4	5	6	7	8	9	10	11	12	13	14	15	16	17	18	19	20	DC	Points
2006	Signature-Plus	Dallara F306/010	Mercedes	HOC; 1; 22	HOC; 2; 12	LAU; 1; 9	LAU; 2; 8	OSC; 1; 10	OSC; 2 Ret	BRH; 1; 15	BRH; 2; 11	NOR; 1; 13	NOR; 2; 4	NÜR; 1; 10	NÜR; 2; 6	ZAN; 1; 11	ZAN; 2; 1	CAT; 1; 6	CAT; 2; 2	LMS; 1; 4	LMS; 2; 2	HOC; 1; 6	HOC; 2 Ret	11th	31
2008	Prema Powerteam	Dallara F308/047	Mercedes	HOC; 1; 2	HOC; 2 Ret	MUG; 1; 17	MUG; 2 Ret	PAU; 1 Ret	PAU; 2; 23	NOR; 1	NOR; 2	ZAN; 1	ZAN; 2	NÜR; 1	NÜR; 2	BRH; 1	BRH; 2	CAT; 1	CAT; 2	LMS; 1	LMS; 2	HOC; 1	HOC; 2	17th	8

=== Complete Formula Renault 3.5 Series results ===
(key)

Year	Entrant	1	2	3	4	5	6	7	8	9	10	11	12	13	14	15	16	17	DC	Points
2007	Victory Engineering	MNZ; FEA; Ret	MNZ; SPR; 8	NÜR; FEA; 16	NÜR; SPR; 8	MON; FEA; Ret	HUN; FEA; 10	HUN; SPR; Ret	SPA; FEA; 13	SPA; SPR; Ret	DON; FEA; Ret	DON; SPR; 13	MAG; FEA; Ret	MAG; SPR; 17	EST; FEA	EST; SPR	CAT; FEA	CAT; SPR	24th	7

=== American open–wheel results ===
(key)

==== Indy Lights ====
Year	Team	1	2	3	4	5	6	7	8	9	10	11	12	13	14	15	Rank	Points
2009	Team PBIR	STP; 10	STP; 7	LBH; 19	KAN; 13	INDY; 13	MIL; 10	IOW; 7	WGL; 4	TOR; 15	EDM; 5	KTY; 18	MOH; 13	SNM; 8	CHI; 7	HMS; 13	10th	310
2010	AFS Racing Andretti Autosport	STP; 4	ALA; 2	LBH; 2	INDY; 2	IOW; 13	WGL; 11	TOR; 4	EDM; 4	MOH; 3	SNM; 2	CHI; 14	KTY; 6	HMS; 13			4th	388

==== IndyCar Series ====
(key)

Year	Team	No.	Chassis	Engine	1	2	3	4	5	6	7	8	9	10	11	12	13	14	15	16	17	18	19	Rank	Points	Ref.
2011	Chip Ganassi Racing	83	Dallara IR-05	Honda	STP; 22	ALA; 10	LBH; 24	SAO; 16	INDY; 13	TXS; 30	TXS; 23	MIL; 14	IOW; 22	TOR; 21	EDM; 17	MOH; 11	NHM; 9	SNM; 26	BAL; 21	MOT; 23	KTY; 13	LVS^{1} C		19th	233	
2012	Chip Ganassi Racing	83	Dallara DW12	Honda	STP; 9	ALA; 25	LBH; 18	SAO; 8	INDY; 8	DET; 8	TXS; 23	MIL; 17	IOW; 11	TOR; 2	EDM; 19	MOH	SNM; 21	BAL; 18	FON; 10					19th	260	
2013	Chip Ganassi Racing	83	Dallara DW12	Honda	STP; 12	ALA; 4	LBH; 21	SAO; 10	INDY; 9	DET; 14	DET; 7	TXS; 17	MIL; 17	IOW; 12	POC; 2	TOR; 21	TOR; 6	MOH; 1	SNM; 20	BAL; 6	HOU; 11	HOU; 8	FON; 10	9th	427	
2014	Chip Ganassi Racing	83	Dallara DW12	Chevrolet	STP; 20	LBH; 23	ALA; 10	IMS; 5	INDY; 31	DET; 9	DET; 3	TXS; 10	HOU; 18	HOU; 4	POC; 17	IOW; 10	TOR; 7	TOR; 4	MOH; 7	MIL; 16	SNM; 21	FON; 12		14th	402	
2015	Chip Ganassi Racing	83	Dallara DW12	Chevrolet	STP; 21	NLA; 14	LBH; 15	ALA; 12	IMS; 5	INDY; 3	DET; 22	DET; 11	TXS; 7	TOR; 20	FON; 8	MIL; 12	IOW; 22	MOH; 23	POC; 12	SNM; 3				12th	372	
2016	Chip Ganassi Racing	83	Dallara DW12	Chevrolet	STP; 10	PHX; 12	LBH; 11	ALA; 9	IMS; 5		DET; 8	DET; 16	RDA; 6	IOW; 10	TOR; 11	MOH; 8	POC; 15	TXS; 6	WGL; 6	SNM; 9				9th	433	
2016	Chip Ganassi Racing	42	Dallara DW12	Chevrolet						INDY; 5														9th	433	
2017	Chip Ganassi Racing	83	Dallara DW12	Honda	STP; 18	LBH; 21	ALA; 15	PHX; 8	IMS; 21	INDY; 25	DET; 21	DET; 8	TXS; 21	ROA; 6	IOW; 15	TOR; 12	MOH; 13	POC; 16	GTW; 7	WGL; 7	SNM; 11			17th	327	
2018	Carlin	23	Dallara DW12	Chevrolet	STP; 20	PHX; 17	LBH; 10	ALA; 23	IMS; 20	INDY; 18	DET; 19	DET; 8	TXS; 10	ROA; 18	IOW; 14	TOR; 5	MOH; 16	POC; 9	GTW; 19	POR; 7	SNM; 22			17th	287	
2019	Carlin	23	Dallara DW12	Chevrolet	STP; 17	COA	ALA	LBH	IMS	INDY; 25	DET	DET	TXS; 21	RDA	TOR	IOW	MOH	POC; 10	GTW; 15	POR; 10	LAG; 15			25th	117	
2020	A. J. Foyt Enterprises	4	Dallara DW12	Chevrolet	TXS; 11	IMS; 18	ROA; 11	ROA; 10	IOW; 17	IOW; 16	INDY; 18	GTW; 13	GTW; 18	MOH; 21	MOH; 19	IMS; 13	IMS; 23	STP; 8						18th	218	
2021	A. J. Foyt Enterprises	11	Dallara DW12	Chevrolet	ALA	STP	TXS	TXS	IMS; 22	INDY; DNQ	DET	DET	ROA	MOH	NSH	IMS	GTW	POR	LAG	LBH; 18				36th	20	

* Season still in progress.

- ^{1} The Las Vegas Indy 300 was abandoned after Dan Wheldon died from injuries sustained in a 15-car crash on lap 11.

Years	Teams	Races	Poles	Wins	Top 5s	Top 10s	Indianapolis 500 wins	Championships
5	1	84	1	1	11	33	0	0

==== Indianapolis 500 ====
Year	Chassis	Engine	Start	Finish	Team
2011	Dallara	Honda	28	13	Chip Ganassi Racing
2012	Dallara	Honda	14	8	Chip Ganassi Racing
2013	Dallara	Honda	19	9	Chip Ganassi Racing
2014	Dallara	Chevrolet	26	31	Chip Ganassi Racing
2015	Dallara	Chevrolet	14	3	Chip Ganassi Racing
2016	Dallara	Chevrolet	16	5	Chip Ganassi Racing
2017	Dallara	Honda	16	25	Chip Ganassi Racing
2018	Dallara	Chevrolet	15	18	Carlin
2019	Dallara	Chevrolet	20	25	Carlin
2020	Dallara	Chevrolet	29	18	A. J. Foyt Enterprises
2021	Dallara	Chevrolet	DNQ		A. J. Foyt Enterprises
