= 2014 Pocono IndyCar 500 =

(United States) 2014 Pocono IndyCar 500
Race details
- 11th round of the 2014 IndyCar Series season
- Date: July 6, 2014
- Official name: Pocono IndyCar 500
- Location: Long Pond, Pennsylvania
- Course: Permanent racing facility 2.5 mi / 4.023 km
- Distance: 200 laps 500 mi / 804.6 km

Pole position
- Driver: Juan Pablo Montoya
- Time: 40.1929 + 40.2105 = 1:20.4034

Fastest lap
- Driver: Ryan Briscoe
- Time: 40.9009 (on lap 180 of 200)

Podium
- First: (Colombia) Juan Pablo Montoya (Team Penske)
- Second: (Brazil) Hélio Castroneves (Team Penske)
- Third: (Colombia) Carlos Muñoz (Andretti Autosport)

The 2014 Pocono IndyCar 500 was the twenty-first running of the event, and was an IndyCar Series race held on July 6, 2014, at the Pocono Raceway in Long Pond, Pennsylvania. The race was the eleventh in the 2014 IndyCar Series season. Juan Pablo Montoya won the pole and later went on to win the race, which was the fastest 500 mile automobile race of any kind in history.

== Background ==
In late May, Ryan Hunter-Reay won the 2014 Indianapolis 500. He entered Pocono with a chance to win the Triple Crown (IndyCar). For the first time since the 1970s, the Pocono 500 awarded double points as part of IndyCar's efforts to increase the importance of its 500-mile races.

Entering the race weekend, IndyCar's future at Pocono was in jeopardy. Track president Brandon Igdalsky declared that ticket sales for the event "were kind of scary" compared to the inaugural event in 2013. It was believed the date on Independence Day weekend was unappealing to spectators in addition to being sandwiched between two NASCAR races. The track insisted they would consider exiting their contract with IndyCar at the end of 2014 if the race lost money.

In October 2014, it was confirmed that IndyCar would return to Pocono in 2015 but at a later date in August. "I’m excited about the new date and getting away from the Fourth of July,” Igdalsky said. “According to most of the fans I talked to, that was the thing that really hurt us with attendance."

== Summary ==
=== Practice ===
Two practice sessions and Time Trials were held on Saturday, July 5.

In the opening 60-minute practice session, Tony Kanaan posted the fastest speed at 221.344 mph. He was followed by Ryan Hunter-Reay at 220.882 mph and Marco Andretti at 220.470 mph.

In the second 60-minute practice session, Will Power posted the fastest lap with a speed of 223.348 mph. Halfway through the session, Jack Hawksworth spun in turn one and impacted the wall with the left side of the car. Hawksworth was treated and released by the infield medical center but soon began to feel unwell. He went to a local hospital where he was diagnosed with a myocardial contusion, better known as a bruised heart. Hawksworth was not cleared to drive in the Pocono 500 but returned to racing in the IndyCar race at Iowa six days later.

=== Time Trials ===
Qualifying was held in the late afternoon. The lineup was set by a two-lap average speed. Juan Pablo Montoya was the last car to qualify and posted a first lap speed of 223.920 mph and a two-lap average of 223.871 mph, both track records. Montoya's teammate Will Power was the second fastest qualifier with Carlos Muñoz starting third to complete the front row.

It was Montoya's 15th career pole in IndyCar and his first since the 2000 Honda Indy 300. It was also Montoya's second pole at Pocono in less than two years, having won the pole for the August 2012 NASCAR Cup Series Pennsylvania 400.

=== Race ===
From his position in the middle of the front row, Will Power took the lead from Juan Pablo Montoya at the beginning of the race. After starting fifth, Marco Andretti passed Montoya for second entering turn one, but Montoya repassed Andretti entering turn two. Power led for the first 30 laps until he made his first green flag pit stop on lap 31.

2014 Indianapolis 500 champion Ryan Hunter-Reay, went to the garage early with mechanical problems but returned to the track and finished 18th, 19 laps behind the leaders.

On lap 50, Tony Kanaan passed Power entering turn three to take the lead. With the exceptions of green flag pit stops, Kanaan led the majority of the next 100 laps as the race continued without interruption. During the cycle of green flag pit stops on lap 155, Will Power overtook Kanaan to assume the lead.

After 158 laps were run without a caution flag, Graham Rahal spun exiting turn two and avoided the wall. Rahal believed the spin was due to a mechanical failure.

When the race restarted on lap 165, Power's lead was immediately challenged by Montoya in turn one. Power and Montoya raced side-by-side through the first turn and onto the Long Pond Straightaway. Entering turn two, Montoya backed off and followed Power through the turn. As the cars completed one lap, Montoya closely drafted Power down the frontstretch. As Montoya moved to the outside of Power at the end of the frontstretch, the two cars touched and Montoya's front wing end plate was broken off. Montoya completed the pass on the outside in turn one and took the lead. Power was quickly passed by Carlos Muñoz for second.

On lap 168, Helio Castroneves closed up on Power for third on the frontstretch. Power made a blocking move as Castroneves passed to the inside. IndyCar officials penalized Power for blocking and Power was forced to make a drive-through penalty.

Montoya made his final pit stop for fuel with 13 laps remaining. Josef Newgarden held the lead for seven laps before he made his final pit stop. That gave the lead to Tony Kanaan who led for two lap before making his final stop with four laps remaining.

Montoya won the Pocono 500 by a margin of 2.340 seconds over his teammate Helio Castroneves. The race was completed in two hours, 28 minutes, and 14 seconds, an average speed of 202.402 mph. It was the first time a 500-mile auto race was completed at an average speed over 200 mph and as of 2023 remains the fastest 500-mile race of any kind in motorsport history. There were 16 lead changes among 5 drivers.

It was Montoya's first Indy car win since the September 2000 race at Gateway.

== Broadcasting ==
The race was broadcast by NBCSN. Booth announcers were Bob Varsha, Townsend Bell, and Paul Tracy. Reporting from the pits were Kelli Stavast, Jon Beekhuis, Kevin Lee, and Robin Miller.

The race attracted a TV rating of 0.2 and 342,000 viewers. Ratings were affected by NASCAR's broadcast of the 2014 Coke Zero 400 airing at the same time.

Previous race: 2014 Grand Prix of Houston	Verizon IndyCar Series; 2014 season	Next race: 2014 Iowa Corn Indy 300
Previous race: 2013 Pocono IndyCar 400	Pocono IndyCar 400	Next race: 2015 ABC Supply 500
