= 2016 IndyCar Grand Prix at The Glen =

(United States) 2016 Watkins Glen
Race details
15th round of the 2016 IndyCar Series season
← Previous race	Next race →
- Date: September 4, 2016
- Official name: Grand Prix at The Glen
- Location: Watkins Glen International
- Course: Permanent racing facility 3.370 mi / 5.423 km
- Distance: 60 laps 202.200 mi / 325.409 km

Pole position
- Driver: (New Zealand) Scott Dixon (Chip Ganassi Racing)
- Time: 1:22.5259

Fastest lap
- Driver: (Brazil) Tony Kanaan (Chip Ganassi Racing)
- Time: 1:23.9436 (on lap 46 of 60)

Podium
- First: (New Zealand) Scott Dixon (Chip Ganassi Racing)
- Second: (United States) Josef Newgarden (Ed Carpenter Racing)
- Third: (Brazil) Hélio Castroneves (Team Penske)

The 2016 IndyCar Grand Prix at The Glen presented by Hitachi was the 15th round of the 2016 IndyCar Series. The race was scheduled Labor Day weekend and occurred on September 4, 2016. It marked the first time that the series had visited the course since 2010 and the 10th time the series had visited the circuit in its history.

== Background ==
Watkins Glen International was a late addition to the 2016 IndyCar Series schedule. Following the cancellation of the Grand Prix of Boston, Indycar and Watkins Glen reached an agreement for Watkins Glen to be the replacement venue. It was slotted as the penultimate race of the season.

Following the 2015 NASCAR event at the circuit, the course had been repaved. As a result, speeds for the IndyCars were expected to greatly increase from where they were in 2010.

== Report ==
=== Qualifying ===
Qualifying took place on Saturday, September 3. Scott Dixon took pole position with a time of 1:22.5259, demolishing the previous track record by over five seconds and setting an average lap speed of 146 mph (230 km/h); which made Watkins Glen the fastest road circuit on the IndyCar calendar- even faster than Road America. Championship contender Will Power qualified in second, while Sébastien Bourdais qualified third. Championship leader Simon Pagenaud qualified in seventh.

Three drivers were given penalties during qualification, all for interfering with other drivers. James Hinchcliffe and Graham Rahal received this penalty during round one of qualifying, while Mikhail Aleshin was penalized during round two.

=== Race ===
The race took place on September 4, 2016. The start saw Scott Dixon and Will Power maintain their positions, while Simon Pagenaud managed an excellent start that allowed him to jump up to seventh position. As the field came through the first turn, two separate incidents occurred. Sébastien Bourdais was first forced into the tire barriers on the inside of the turn. At the same time, Juan Pablo Montoya and Mikhail Aleshin came together, sending both into a spin. All cars were able to continue and no full course caution was needed. As the race continued, Dixon began to pull out a sizable lead on Power, while Pagenaud came under pressure from Tony Kanaan and the other drivers he had past at the start. On lap 13, Kanaan was finally able to get around Pagenaud to move into the top 3.

Green flag pit stops began around lap 10. Dixon was the first of the leaders to pit on lap 14. This would prove a huge advantage for Dixon, as the first caution of the race flew one lap later when the left-rear tire on Mikhail Aleshin's car deflated in turn four, sending into a spin and into the wall on the backstretch. This forced all other leaders to pit under caution and lose track position to those who had already pitted. Of those forced to pit under yellow, Kanaan emerged from the pits first, followed by Pagenaud and then Power, who had an uncharacteristically slow stop. Up front, Dixon re-inherited the lead, while his teammate Max Chilton moved to second and Team Penske's Juan Pablo Montoya to third. Kanaan, the best of the cars who pitted, was 12th.

Racing resumed on lap 19 with Dixon pulling out even faster than before. However, after only one lap, caution flew again when Charlie Kimball and Graham Rahal made contact exiting turn one, sending Rahal spinning into the inside barriers. During the caution, Hélio Castroneves and RC Enerson pitted to top off with fuel. One lap before the restart, Kanaan suddenly slowed with a broken toe-link in the rear suspension of his car. While he eventually brought the car back to pit lane, the repairs cost him two laps and removed his chances of a high placing.

Racing once again resumed on lap 24, and in only two laps, Dixon had extended his lead back out over five seconds. On lap 28, Montoya moved around Chilton to put himself in second. Pit stops came again around lap 30. Dixon pitted on lap 31, handing the lead over to Montoya. Montoya would pit the next lap, however, which handed the lead over to James Hinchcliffe. Further back in the field, Will Power came in for a pit stop earlier than his championship rival Simon Pagenaud. However, after coming out in the middle of slower traffic, Power lost significant ground to Pagenaud, giving Pagenaud a gap and a potential increase in his points lead. On lap 33, Hinchcliffe came in for his pit stop, which handed the lead to Hélio Castroneves. Castroneves managed to stay out until lap 36, which handed the lead once again to Scott Dixon.

On lap 39, the third and final caution of the day occurred when Charlie Kimball and Will Power made contact in turn four, sending Power into the outside wall. Following examination in the infield care center after the incident, medical staff stated that Power had displayed concussion-like symptoms and would not be cleared to race at the following round until he underwent further testing. For the rest of the field, the incident allowed for the final pit stops of the day, with the exceptions of Carlos Muñoz, Marco Andretti, and Takuma Sato, who all stayed out. During pit stops, Castroneves was able to leap frog Dixon, making him leader of those who had pitted. Josef Newgarden, Juan Pablo Montoya, and Simon Pagenaud emerged behind them.

Racing once again resumed on lap 42, where Dixon immediately moved back around Castroneves. Only two laps later, Dixon had passed all those who had stayed out during the caution and resumed the lead. Muñoz remained in second position until his pit stop on lap 49. At this time, nearly all teams became concerned about making it to the end of the race on fuel. As such, several drivers attempted to conserve fuel. The saving caused the order to be shuffled. Pagenaud began to drop back through the field, while Castroneves, Max Chilton, and Charlie Kimball were all forced to take a splash of fuel in the closing laps of the race. On the same lap, Juan Pablo Montoya spun in turn three, ruining what seemed set for a good finish.

Up front, there were no concerns for Scott Dixon, who coasted easily to victory. Behind him, however, last lap drama occurred when second place runner James Hinchcliffe, who had moved up in the order as others pitted, ran out of fuel and coasted to a halt only two turns from the finish. Josef Newgarden moved by to take second, while Castroneves managed to take the last step of the podium despite his pit stop. Conor Daly, despite running out of fuel, came across the line fourth, making him both the highest finishing Honda and highest finishing rookie in the race. Sébastien Bourdais rounded out the top five. Hinchcliffe dropped all the way down the order to 18th following his heartbreaking finish.

Scott Dixon's victory was the 40th victory of his career and his fourth at Watkins Glen International. Dixon dominated the race, leading all but 10 of the race's 60 laps and finishing over 16 seconds ahead of second place. In victory lane, Dixon announced that he would donate his entire prize winnings to the Justin Wilson Children's Fund. The championship standings saw major changes as a result of the event, with Simon Pagenaud and Will Power becoming the only two drivers still able to win. Pagenaud's seventh-place finish allowed him to extend his lead by almost twenty points following Power's incident and subsequent 20th-place finish, giving Pagenaud a significant margin heading into the final race of the season.

== Results ==
Key	Meaning
R	Rookie
W	Past winner

=== Qualifying ===
Pos	No.	Name	Grp.	Round 1	Round 2	Round 3
1	9	(New Zealand) Scott Dixon W	2	1:23.8362	1:23.1807	1:22.5259
2	12	(Australia) Will Power W	1	1:23.3927	1:23.2957	1:22.5742
3	11	(France) Sébastien Bourdais	2	1:23.8871	1:22.9747	1:22.7844
4	3	(Brazil) Hélio Castroneves	2	1:23.6200	1:23.1147	1:22.8748
5	10	(Brazil) Tony Kanaan	2	1:23.8980	1:22.9977	1:22.9158
6	8	(United Kingdom) Max Chilton R	1	1:23.4046	1:23.1591	1:23.0064
7	22	(France) Simon Pagenaud	1	1:23.6882	1:23.4660	
8	2	(Colombia) Juan Pablo Montoya	2	1:24.1195	1:23.5493	
9	41	(United Kingdom) Jack Hawksworth	2	1:24.4362	1:23.6392	
10	7	(Russia) Mikhail Aleshin	1	1:24.0186	1:23.7744	
11	19	(United States) RC Enerson R	1	1:23.9250	1:23.9907	
12	21	(United States) Josef Newgarden	1	1:23.8082	1:24.0983	
13	5	(Canada) James Hinchcliffe	1	1:24.0477		
14	83	(United States) Charlie Kimball	2	1:24.8928		
15	98	(United States) Alexander Rossi R	1	1:24.0908		
16	26	(Colombia) Carlos Muñoz	2	1:25.5560		
17	18	(United States) Conor Daly R	1	1:24.2606		
18	27	(United States) Marco Andretti	2	1:26.4285		
19	28	(United States) Ryan Hunter-Reay W	1	1:24.5254		
20	15	(United States) Graham Rahal	2	1:58.1893		
21	20	(United States) Spencer Pigot R	1	1:25.1826		
22	14	(Japan) Takuma Sato	2	2:12.3265		
OFFICIAL BOX SCORE

Source for individual rounds:

=== Race ===
Pos	No.	Driver	Team	Engine	Laps	Time/Retired	Pit Stops	Grid	Laps Led	Pts.^{1}
1	9	(New Zealand) Scott Dixon W	Chip Ganassi Racing	Chevrolet	60	1:41:39.8592	3	1	50	54
2	21	(United States) Josef Newgarden	Ed Carpenter Racing	Chevrolet	60	+16.5309	3	12		40
3	3	(Brazil) Hélio Castroneves	Team Penske	Chevrolet	60	+21.4417	5	4	2	36
4	18	(United States) Conor Daly R	Dale Coyne Racing	Honda	60	+24.3349	3	17		32
5	11	(France) Sébastien Bourdais	KVSH Racing	Chevrolet	60	+25.3815	3	3		30
6	83	(United States) Charlie Kimball	Chip Ganassi Racing	Chevrolet	60	+29.4268	4	14		28
7	22	(France) Simon Pagenaud	Team Penske	Chevrolet	60	+31.1118	3	7		26
8	98	(United States) Alexander Rossi R	Andretti Herta Autosport	Honda	60	+32.0710	3	15		24
9	19	(United States) RC Enerson R	Dale Coyne Racing	Honda	60	+32.3965	4	11		22
10	8	(United Kingdom) Max Chilton R	Chip Ganassi Racing	Chevrolet	60	+32.9478	4	6		20
11	26	(Colombia) Carlos Muñoz	Andretti Autosport	Honda	60	+34.7869	3	16	3	20
12	27	(United States) Marco Andretti	Andretti Autosport	Honda	60	+35.3813	4	18		18
13	2	(Colombia) Juan Pablo Montoya	Team Penske	Chevrolet	60	+37.7024	4	8	1	18
14	28	(United States) Ryan Hunter-Reay W	Andretti Autosport	Honda	60	+42.4644	3	19		16
15	20	(United States) Spencer Pigot R	Ed Carpenter Racing	Chevrolet	60	+45.3829	3	21		15
16	41	(United Kingdom) Jack Hawksworth	A. J. Foyt Enterprises	Honda	60	+45.7584	3	9		14
17	14	(Japan) Takuma Sato	A. J. Foyt Enterprises	Honda	60	+1:07.4937	4	22		13
18	5	(Canada) James Hinchcliffe	Schmidt Peterson Motorsports	Honda	59	+1 Lap	3	13	2	13
19	10	(Brazil) Tony Kanaan	Chip Ganassi Racing	Chevrolet	59	+1 Lap	5	5		11
20	12	(Australia) Will Power W	Team Penske	Chevrolet	38	Contact	2	2	2	11
21	15	(United States) Graham Rahal	Rahal Letterman Lanigan Racing	Honda	19	Contact	1	20		9
22	7	(Russia) Mikhail Aleshin	Schmidt Peterson Motorsports	Honda	14	Contact	0	10		8
OFFICIAL BOX SCORE

Notes

^{1} Points include 1 point for leading at least 1 lap during a race, an additional 2 points for leading the most race laps, and 1 point for Pole Position.

Source for time gaps:

== Championship standings after the race ==
Drivers' Championship standings

	Pos	Driver	Points
	1	(France) Simon Pagenaud	555
	2	(Australia) Will Power	512
3	3	(New Zealand) Scott Dixon	451
	4	(Brazil) Hélio Castroneves	451
	5	(United States) Josef Newgarden	446

- Note: Only the top five positions are included.

Previous race: 2016 Firestone 600	IndyCar Series; 2016 season	Next race: 2016 GoPro Grand Prix of Sonoma
Previous race: 2010 Camping World Grand Prix at The Glen	Grand Prix at The Glen	Next race: 2017 IndyCar Grand Prix at The Glen
