= Grand Prix at The Glen =

IndyCar Series
- Venue: Watkins Glen International
- First race: 1979
- First ICS race: 2005
- Last race: 2017
- Distance: 204 miles (328.306 km)
- Laps: 60
- Previous names: Kent Oil 150 (1979–1980); Watkins Glen 200 (1981); Watkins Glen Indy Grand Prix Presented by Argent Mortgage (2005); Watkins Glen Indy Grand Prix Presented by Tissot (2006); Camping World Watkins Glen Grand Prix (2007); Camping World Indy Grand Prix at the Glen (2008–2009); Camping World Grand Prix at the Glen (2010); Indycar Grand Prix at the Glen (2016–2017)
- Most wins (driver): Scott Dixon (4)
- Most wins (team): Penske Racing & Chip Ganassi Racing (4)

The Grand Prix at The Glen was an IndyCar Series race held at Watkins Glen International in Watkins Glen, New York. American open wheel racing at the circuit dates back to 1979.

Following a five-year hiatus, Watkins Glen was added back to the schedule for the 2016 season following the cancellation of the proposed Grand Prix of Boston. However, after the 2017 Season, it was announced that Portland International Raceway would be brought back to the 2018 IndyCar schedule, replacing the Watkins Glen event.

== History ==
=== CART ===
The CART series held the first American open wheel racing events at the circuit from 1979–1981. It was held during the waning years of the Formula One United States Grand Prix. At the time the popular track was starting to lose some of its image, and by 1981, fell into bankruptcy. The Formula One race was cancelled for 1981, and for that year, the CART race took over its traditional October date.

For 1979 and 1980, the CART series utilized the 2.428-mile (3.907 km) course layout, also known colloquially as the Six Hours course. In 1981, the "Boot" segment was utilized, and the Scheckter Chicane was removed, resulting in a 3.377-mile (5.435 km) layout.

After 1981, the CART series left, and did not return. The track was continuing to suffer from financial difficulties and was falling into a state of disrepair. Eventually, the circuit was sold to ISC, and began to regain stature and popularity with the addition of NASCAR in 1986.

=== IndyCar Series ===
The IRL IndyCar Series debuted at the track in 2005, the first season in which the IRL added road courses to the schedule. During its entire run, the IndyCar Series race utilized the full 3.403-mile (5.477 km) circuit. The layout included the "Boot" and the "Inner Loop" bus stop chicane that was built in 1992.

In its first year, the race was scheduled for the traditional fall date. In 2006, however, it was moved to early June, the weekend immediately following the Indianapolis 500. It was paired alongside the traditional 6 Hours of Watkins Glen sports car event weekend. The move proved very unpopular, and was met with cool temperatures and rain. After only one season with the sports car and IndyCar doubleheader, for 2007, the IndyCar race was moved to Independence Day weekend.

The 2009 race, won by Justin Wilson, was the first IndyCar race ever won by Dale Coyne Racing, after 25 years of competition in the sport.

On June 28, 2007, Camping World signed a four-year deal to be the title sponsor of the race through 2010. Despite being considered a top venue by competitors, the race suffered from low attendance. Management believed that coupling the race with July 4 weekend was not ideal for attendance because many locals were out-of-town, and local college students were typically out of school for the summer and likewise also out-of-town. Furthermore, ISC, which owns Watkins Glen, pulled their events from the IndyCar calendar for 2011 after a dispute regarding sanctioning fees.

On May 13, 2016, following the cancellation of the proposed Grand Prix of Boston, the IndyCar Series announced that it would return to Watkins Glen, with the revived race being held on Labor Day weekend. Track management embraced the traditional fall date as the vacation season was over, and it enabled them to market to locals and college students whom were now back in town.

== Past winners ==
Season	Date	Driver	Team	Chassis	Engine	Race Distance		Race Time	Average Speed (mph)	Report	Ref
Season	Date	Driver	Team	Chassis	Engine	Laps	Miles (km)	Race Time	Average Speed (mph)	Report	Ref
CART Champ Car history
1979	Aug 5	(United States) Bobby Unser	Penske Racing	Penske	Cosworth	62	150.474 (242.164)	1:14:42	120.889	Report	
1980	Aug 3	(United States) Bobby Unser (2)	Penske Racing (2)	Penske	Cosworth	62	150.536 (242.264)	1:30:51	99.309	Report	
1981	Oct 4	(United States) Rick Mears	Penske Racing (3)	Penske	Cosworth	60	202.62 (326.085)	1:52:17	108.273	Report	
1982 – 2004	Not held										
IRL IndyCar Series history
2005	Sept 25	(New Zealand) Scott Dixon	Chip Ganassi Racing	Panoz G-Force	Toyota	60	204 (328.306)	1:45:42	114.771	Report	
2006	June 4	(New Zealand) Scott Dixon (2)	Chip Ganassi Racing (2)	Panoz G-Force	Honda	55*	187 (300.947)	2:00:20	92.418	Report	
2007	July 8	(New Zealand) Scott Dixon (3)	Chip Ganassi Racing (3)	Dallara	Honda	60	204 (328.306)	1:43:52	116.813	Report	
2008	July 6	(United States) Ryan Hunter-Reay	Rahal Letterman Racing	Dallara	Honda	60	204 (328.306)	1:54:01	106.403	Report	
2009	July 5	(United Kingdom) Justin Wilson	Dale Coyne Racing	Dallara	Honda	60	204 (328.306)	1:48:24	111.915	Report	
2010	July 4	(Australia) Will Power	Penske Racing (4)	Dallara	Honda	60	204 (328.306)	1:40:27	120.768	Report	
2011 – 2015	Not held										
2016	Sept 4	(New Zealand) Scott Dixon (4)	Chip Ganassi Racing (4)	Dallara	Chevrolet	60	204.18 (328.595)	1:41:40	119.334	Report	
2017	Sept 3	(United States) Alexander Rossi	Andretti Herta Autosport	Dallara	Honda	60	202.2 (325.409)	1:42:04	118.865	Report	

- 2006: Race shortened due to two-hour time limit.

== Support race history ==
Indy Pro Series / Indy Lights
Season	Date	Winning driver
2005	Sept 25	(United States) Jeff Simmons
2006	June 4	(United States) Bobby Wilson
2007	July 7	(New Zealand) Wade Cunningham
2007	July 8	(United Kingdom) Alex Lloyd
2008	July 5	(Brazil) Raphael Matos
2008	July 5	(United States) Richard Antinucci
2009	July 4	(United States) J. R. Hildebrand
2010	July 4	(France) Jean-Karl Vernay
2011 – 2015	Not held	
2016	Sept 3	(United States) Zach Veach
2017	Sept 3	(United States) Aaron Telitz

Atlantic Championship
Season	Date	Winning driver
1974	Oct 4	(United States) Bill O'Connor
1975 – 1986	Not held	
1987	July 5	(United Kingdom) Calvin Fish
1988	Not held	
1989	July 1	(United States) Jocko Cunningham
1990	July 1	(United States) Brian Till
1991	June 29	(United States) Jimmy Vasser
1992	June 27	(United Kingdom) Russell Spence

Stadium Super Trucks
Season	Date	Winning driver	Ref
2017	September 2	(United States) Robby Gordon	
2017	September 3	(Australia) Matthew Brabham	
