= 2016 Firestone 600 =

(United States) 2016 Firestone 600
Race details
14th round of the 2016 IndyCar Series season
← Previous race	Next race →
- Date: June 12/August 27, 2016
- Official name: Firestone 600
- Location: Texas Motor Speedway
- Course: Permanent racing facility 1.455 mi / 2.342 km
- Distance: 248 laps 360.8 mi / 580.8 km

Pole position
- Driver: (Colombia) Carlos Muñoz (Andretti Autosport)
- Time: 24.1148 + 24.1312 = 48.2460

Fastest lap
- Driver: (New Zealand) Scott Dixon (Chip Ganassi Racing)
- Time: 24.3797 (on lap 119 of 248)

Podium
- First: (United States) Graham Rahal (Rahal Letterman Lanigan Racing)
- Second: (Canada) James Hinchcliffe (Schmidt Peterson Motorsports)
- Third: (Brazil) Tony Kanaan (Chip Ganassi Racing)

The 2016 Firestone 600 was the 14th round of the 2016 IndyCar Series season, contested over 248 laps at the 1.5-mile (2.4 km) Texas Motor Speedway in Fort Worth, Texas. The race was originally scheduled as the ninth round of the series and originally began on June 12, 2016, following an extended series of delays caused by rain. After 71 laps, the race was suspended due to further rainfall, and rescheduled to continue on August 27, 2016.

== Report ==
=== June 11–12 weekend ===
The race was originally scheduled to be held on the evening of June 11, for a 7:50 p.m. CT start. The track experienced rainfall throughout the afternoon, which subsided about three hours prior to the race's scheduled start time. However, due to difficulties in fully drying the track because of the high humidity and weepers (water seeping out from cracks in the racing surface), officials called off the race at 10:30 p.m., and rescheduled it to Sunday afternoon. The race began at 1:49 p.m. CT, which itself was delayed from a 1:06 p.m. start in order to address issues with the track's drainage system. Josef Newgarden and Conor Daly were involved in a wreck on lap 42, which resulted in an extended, nearly 30-lap caution period in order to repair a SAFER barrier. Newgarden suffered a fractured clavicle and wrist in the accident. At 2:42 p.m., the race was red flagged on lap 71 due to further heavy rainfall, and ultimately suspended. Under IndyCar Series rules, the race could only be declared official after lap 125.

Due to forecasts calling for more rain on Monday, and logistical issues surrounding driver participation (several IndyCar Series drivers were scheduled to participate in the 2016 24 Hours of Le Mans the following weekend) and impact on testing schedules, IndyCar announced that the Firestone 600 would be restarted on the evening of August 27, 2016 at 8:15 p.m. The race would continue from lap 71, with James Hinchcliffe as leader.

Driver substitutions were not allowed, and only drivers whose cars were capable of resuming the race at the time it was originally halted were allowed to participate. Cars were required to use the same body configuration they had initially used at the original time of the race, although they did not need to use the same car or engine. All tickets from the original race remained valid. The track also announced incentives and other promotions for the rescheduled race, including discounted tickets and food, free T-shirts, free tickets for those who purchase tickets to the NASCAR Sprint Cup Series' AAA Texas 500 playoff round, and an autograph session with drivers. Special events for police were also involved as part of "Back the Blue" on the rescheduled weekend.

=== August 27 ===
The rescheduled continuation of the event occurred on August 27 with far better weather than the original attempt to complete the race. Two 10-minute practice sessions were held a few hours before the race to allow for the drivers to warm-up before the race's continuation. Scott Dixon was the fastest of these sessions with a time of 24.369. At the beginning of the first session, Takuma Sato crashed following a suspension piece breaking on his car, putting him in jeopardy of not be able to restart the race. The team would be able to repair the car in time, but Sato retired early due to mechanical issues.

The restart of the race saw Ryan Hunter-Reay move past James Hinchcliffe for the race lead almost immediately. However, on lap 79, Hinchcliffe retook the lead and began to pull away from the rest of the field quickly. Hélio Castroneves moved into second position on lap 85 and became to only person who could keep pace with Hinchcliffe over the early stages of the race. Hunter-Reay began falling through the field with handling issues, moving Graham Rahal to third.

The first round of pit stops came between roughly lap 100 and lap 120. Hinchcliffe was able to extend his tires all the way to lap 120, proving the good handling of his car. The lead briefly changed to Castroneves during Hinchcliffe's stop, but Hinchcliffe quickly moved back around Castroneves due to his fresher tires. The running order remained largely unchanged until the next round of pit stops, where several cars had to pit much earlier than intended due to tire wear. This allowed for Ed Carpenter to move into second place and slowly begin catching Hinchcliffe. Castroneves moved back into the top three after pit stops for the leaders, but poor handling once again forced him to pit early.

The final round of green flag pit stops came roughly around lap 200. James Hinchcliffe once again emerged the leader over Carpenter. On lap 213, however, the complexion of the race changed when the first caution period of the night came out. Scott Dixon, attempting to pass Ed Carpenter and get closer to getting back on the lead lap, made contact with Carpenter's left rear tire, sending Dixon into a spin and into the turn one wall. Hélio Castroneves was tapped at the tail end of the incident, but suffered no significant damage. The incident allowed several drivers, including Graham Rahal, Tony Kanaan, and lap down drivers Mikhail Aleshin and Simon Pagenaud, to come into the pits for fresh tires in hopes of gaining an advantage. Hinchcliffe, however, continued to lead.

Racing resumed on lap 220, with Carpenter now giving Hinchcliffe a serious challenge for the lead. Meanwhile, Aleshin was able to pass his teammate Hinchcliffe to put himself back on the lead lap. On lap 224, the left rear tire on Carpenter's car went down in turn four, possibly from the damage sustained in the prior incident with Dixon, sending Carpenter into a spin and collecting Castroneves. Carpenter was out of the race, while Castroneves miraculously avoided race-ending damage and managed to stay on the lead lap. Aleshin was able to circle back around to the tail end of the field as the fifth and final car on the lead lap.

Racing once again resumed on 230, where Simon Pagenaud managed to get by Hinchcliffe to get himself back on the lead lap as well. One lap later, caution flew again, this time for Aleshin spinning in turn four and collecting Jack Hawksworth, putting them both out of the race. This set up an eight lap shoot-out to the end, with James Hinchcliffe, Tony Kanaan, Graham Rahal, Hélio Castroneves, and Simon Pagenaud the only cars on the lead lap. During the yellow, Kanaan, Pagenaud, and Castroneves all elected to pit for fresh tires.

The final restart of the night came on lap 240, with all but Castroneves in contention for the victory. Hinchcliffe was able to barely maintain the lead lap after lap. However, on the final lap of the race, Rahal was able to get inside of Hinchcliffe in turn three, allowing him to pull in front in the turn. Hinchcliffe made ground back up Rahal on the frontstretch, but came just short, with Rahal crossing the line only 8 thousands of a second before Hinchcliffe. Kanaan came across the line third, while Pagenaud finished fourth.

The finish between Rahal and Hinchcliffe was the closest finish in the history of Texas Motor Speedway and the fifth-closest in the history of the IndyCar Series. For Rahal, the victory was the fourth of his career and his first since Mid-Ohio of the previous season. It also marked the first win for a Honda powered car since the Indianapolis 500. Further back, Simon Pagenaud managed to increase his championship lead slightly over his teammate Will Power, who finished in eighth, with only two races remaining in the championship. Alexander Rossi was the highest placed rookie in the race with an 11th-place finish.

Following the race, James Hinchcliffe and Schmidt Peterson Motorsports were deemed to have violated dome skid wear rules during the race. The team was fined $20,000 for the infraction. In addition, 25 points were deducted from the cars entrant points and from Hinchcliffe's driver's points total.

== Results ==
Key	Meaning
R	Rookie
W	Past winner

=== Qualifying ===
Pos	No.	Name	Lap 1 Time	Lap 2 Time	Total Time	Avg. Speed (mph)
1	26	(Colombia) Carlos Muñoz	24.1148	24.1312	48.2460	217.137
2	9	(New Zealand) Scott Dixon W	24.1177	24.1809	48.2986	216.901
3	3	(Brazil) Hélio Castroneves W	24.1543	24.1800	48.3343	216.740
4	14	(Japan) Takuma Sato	24.1518	24.1826	48.3344	216.740
5	21	(United States) Josef Newgarden	24.1147	24.2323	48.3470	216.684
6	22	(France) Simon Pagenaud	24.1578	24.1938	48.3516	216.663
7	12	(Australia) Will Power W	24.1310	24.2241	48.3551	216.647
8	10	(Brazil) Tony Kanaan W	24.2046	24.2293	48.4339	216.295
9	98	(United States) Alexander Rossi R	24.1853	24.2559	48.4412	216.262
10	5	(Canada) James Hinchcliffe	24.2131	24.2282	48.4413	216.262
11	28	(United States) Ryan Hunter-Reay	24.1858	24.2560	48.4418	216.260
12	27	(United States) Marco Andretti	24.2280	24.2357	48.4637	216.162
13	15	(United States) Graham Rahal	24.2484	24.2680	48.5164	215.927
14	20	(United States) Ed Carpenter W	24.2352	24.3208	48.5560	215.751
15	83	(United States) Charlie Kimball	24.2607	24.3444	48.6051	215.533
16	7	(Russia) Mikhail Aleshin	24.3050	24.3528	48.6578	215.299
17	2	(Colombia) Juan Pablo Montoya	24.3072	24.3552	48.6624	215.279
18	11	(France) Sébastien Bourdais	24.3441	24.3746	48.7187	215.030
19	8	(United Kingdom) Max Chilton R	24.3430	24.4135	48.7565	214.864
20	41	(United Kingdom) Jack Hawksworth	24.4076	24.4160	48.8236	214.568
21	18	(United States) Conor Daly R	24.5178	24.4753	48.9931	213.826
22	19	(Colombia) Gabby Chaves			No Time	No Speed
OFFICIAL BOX SCORE

=== Race ===
Pos	No.	Driver	Team	Engine	Laps	Time/Retired	Pit Stops	Grid	Laps Led	Pts.^{1}
1	15	(United States) Graham Rahal	Rahal Letterman Lanigan Racing	Honda	248	76:02:29:24.8886	15	13	1	51
2	5	(Canada) James Hinchcliffe	Schmidt Peterson Motorsports	Honda	248	+0.0080	11	10	188	18
3	10	(Brazil) Tony Kanaan W	Chip Ganassi Racing	Chevrolet	248	+0.0903	15	8	1	36
4	22	(France) Simon Pagenaud	Team Penske	Chevrolet	248	+0.4773	15	6		32
5	3	(Brazil) Hélio Castroneves W	Team Penske	Chevrolet	248	+9.3424	17	3	7	31
6	83	(United States) Charlie Kimball	Chip Ganassi Racing	Chevrolet	247	+1 Lap	15	15		28
7	26	(Colombia) Carlos Muñoz	Andretti Autosport	Honda	247	+1 Lap	15	1	37	28
8	12	(Australia) Will Power W	Team Penske	Chevrolet	247	+1 Lap	14	7		24
9	2	(Colombia) Juan Pablo Montoya	Team Penske	Chevrolet	246	+2 Laps	16	17		22
10	11	(France) Sébastien Bourdais	KVSH Racing	Chevrolet	246	+2 Laps	17	18		20
11	98	(United States) Alexander Rossi R	Andretti Herta Autosport	Honda	246	+2 Laps	17	9		19
12	27	(United States) Marco Andretti	Andretti Autosport	Honda	245	+3 Laps	18	12		18
13	28	(United States) Ryan Hunter-Reay	Andretti Autosport	Honda	245	+3 Laps	17	11	11	18
14	19	(Colombia) Gabby Chaves	Dale Coyne Racing	Honda	245	+3 Laps	12	22		16
15	8	(United Kingdom) Max Chilton R	Chip Ganassi Racing	Chevrolet	243	+5 Laps	17	19		15
16	7	(Russia) Mikhail Aleshin	Schmidt Peterson Motorsports	Honda	231	Contact	13	16		14
17	41	(United Kingdom) Jack Hawksworth	A. J. Foyt Enterprises	Honda	227	Contact	18	20		13
18	20	(United States) Ed Carpenter W	Ed Carpenter Racing	Chevrolet	223	Contact	11	14	1	13
19	9	(New Zealand) Scott Dixon W	Chip Ganassi Racing	Chevrolet	211	Contact	13	2		11
20	14	(Japan) Takuma Sato	A. J. Foyt Enterprises	Honda	160	Mechanical	15	4		10
21	18	(United States) Conor Daly R	Dale Coyne Racing	Honda	42	Contact	0	21		9
22	21	(United States) Josef Newgarden	Ed Carpenter Racing	Chevrolet	41	Contact	1	5	2	9
OFFICIAL BOX SCORE

Notes

^{1} Points include 1 point for leading at least 1 lap during a race, an additional 2 points for leading the most race laps, and 1 point for Pole Position.

Source for time gaps:

== Championship standings after the race ==
Drivers' Championship standings

	Pos	Driver	Points
	1	(France) Simon Pagenaud	529
	2	(Australia) Will Power	501
3	3	(Brazil) Tony Kanaan	416
1	4	(Brazil) Hélio Castroneves	415
2	5	(United States) Josef Newgarden	406

- Note: Only the top five positions are included.

Previous race: 2016 ABC Supply 500	IndyCar Series; 2016 season	Next race: 2016 IndyCar Grand Prix at The Glen
Previous race: 2015 Firestone 600	Firestone 600	Next race: 2017 Rainguard Water Sealers 600
