= 2016 ABC Supply 500 =

(United States) 2016 ABC Supply 500
Race details
13th round of the 2016 IndyCar Series season
← Previous race	Next race →
- Date: August 22, 2016
- Official name: ABC Supply 500
- Location: Pocono Raceway
- Course: Permanent racing facility 2.5 mi / 4.0 km
- Distance: 200 laps 500 mi / 800 km

Pole position
- Driver: (Russia) Mikhail Aleshin (Schmidt Peterson Motorsports)
- Time: 1:21.6530

Fastest lap
- Driver: (Australia) Will Power (Team Penske)
- Time: 41.1901 (on lap 151 of 200)

Podium
- First: (Australia) Will Power (Team Penske)
- Second: (Russia) Mikhail Aleshin (Schmidt Peterson Motorsports)
- Third: (United States) Ryan Hunter-Reay (Andretti Autosport)

The 2016 ABC Supply 500 was the 13th round of the 2016 IndyCar Series and the 300th Verizon IndyCar Series event. The event took place at Pocono Raceway in Long Pond, Pennsylvania. It was the fourth consecutive year that the Verizon IndyCar Series had visited the track. The race also marked roughly one year since the fatal accident of Justin Wilson in the previous year's edition of the event. The race was originally scheduled to be run on Sunday, August 21, but heavy thunderstorms forced it to be moved to the following day.

== Report ==
=== Practice ===
Practice began on Saturday morning with a 90 minute session beginning at 9:00 a.m. local time. Early in the session, defending Pocono 500 champion, Ryan Hunter-Reay crashed at the exit of turn one. The car spun 180 degrees, and impacted the wall with the left side. Hunter-Reay was uninjured, but the chassis, the same one he used to win the 2014 Indianapolis 500, was damaged and the team went to a backup car. Later, Charlie Kimball spun at the apex of turn one and hit the wall with the rear of the car. Near the end of the session, Juan Pablo Montoya's car got loose in turn two, he corrected, and impacted the wall with the right side at the exit of the corner. Mikhail Aleshin was fastest with a speed of 221.932 mph. He was followed by his teammate James Hinchcliffe at 220.290 mph. Josef Newgarden, Alexander Rossi, and Carlos Munoz rounded out the top-five.

=== Qualifying ===
Qualifying took place on Saturday, August 20. Mikhail Aleshin surprised the field by securing his first pole position start with a two lap time of 1:21.6530, at an average speed of 220.6 mph (351.0 km/h); this marked Pocono as the third fastest oval on the IndyCar calendar, behind Indianapolis and Texas, respectively. This result also marked the first time a driver from Russia started on pole in an IndyCar Series event. Josef Newgarden qualified alongside him on the front row. Takuma Sato, Hélio Castroneves, and Carlos Muñoz rounded out the top five. Ryan Hunter-Reay did not participate in qualifying after sustaining heavy damage to his car in a practice accident earlier in the day, relegating him to a 22nd and last place start.

=== Final Practice ===
A 30-minute final practice was held at 5:00 p.m. Helio Castroneves set the fastest speed at 218.824 mph. Carlos Munoz was second at 218.043 mph. Simon Pagenaud, Sébastien Bourdais, and Scott Dixon completed the top-five. Juan Pablo Montoya and Ryan Hunter-Reay made laps in backup cars after their morning crashes, with Montoya sixth fastest and Hunter-Reay 13th. There were no incidents.

=== Race ===
After being postponed from its original Sunday date, the race was held on Monday, August 22, with clear but windy weather. The race began with a botched start, as Mikhail Aleshin appeared to jump too early. The race began cleanly on the second start, though, and Aleshin was able to jump into the lead into turn one. However, Josef Newgarden was able to pass him entering turn three, giving him the lead. Behind them, Ryan Hunter-Reay managed to jump up a large number of positions with an outside move in the first turn. As the field made their way through turn three on the first green flag lap, Takuma Sato lost control of his car and hit the outside wall hard, bringing out the first caution period of the day. Scott Dixon suffered a punctured tire from the debris from the incident, forcing him to pit and sending him to the rear of the field.

Racing resumed on lap nine, with Newgarden still leading. After a few moments of battling, Aleshin was able to move by Newgarden on lap 11 and maintain a lead. Alexander Rossi, Carlos Muñoz, and James Hinchcliffe battled for position just behind them. Ryan Hunter-Reay continued his charge through the field and managed to get into the top five by lap 30. At this time, the first round of pit stops occurred. Aleshin remained the leader after all drivers pitted, but Hunter-Reay moved into second. On lap 49, Hunter-Reay passed Aleshin to give him his first lead of the day. Aleshin reclaimed the lead only a few laps later on lap 54. A few laps later, Ed Carpenter retired from the race with engine failure.

Green flag pit stops came around again around lap 60. Aleshin, Hunter-Reay, and Newgarden all made their pitstops without incident. Others, though, were not as fortunate. On lap 64, Alexander Rossi was released from his pit stall into the path of Charlie Kimball. Rossi's car was launched into the air and came back down on the front nose and part of the cockpit of Hélio Castroneves who had just been released from his own pit stop. Rossi and Castroneves were forced out of the race on the spot, while Kimball was able to continue after losing a lap for repairs. All involved emerged without injury. Caution flew for the second time of the race

Racing resumed again on lap 71. Mikhail Aleshin maintained his lead over Ryan Hunter-Reay, while Will Power moved into the top 10. On lap 90, Hunter-Reay managed to pass Aleshin again, once again handing him the lead. Pit stops followed shortly thereafter. Scott Dixon and Will Power were able to stay out on course significantly longer than anyone else, but after stops cycled through, Aleshin once again emerged the leader. Aleshin, Hunter-Reay, and Josef Newgarden remained the top three. further back, Power began to slowly move his way forward, taking seventh position away from Graham Rahal. By lap 120, Power had moved into the top five.

By the end of lap 134, another round of pit stops cycled through, with the top three positions remaining the same. Power, though, jumped to fourth during the sequence, continuing his steady march to the front of the field. Up front, the handling on Aleshin's car began to give way, allowing Hunter-Reay to move into the lead and begin pulling away. Aleshin continued to drop back, and by lap 142 had lost positions to both Newgarden and Power. Power moved past Newgarden a few laps later and began his pursuit of the leader. Pit stops came again during this battle, and on lap 157 Power was able to have a pit stop quick enough to move him into the lead of the race. Two laps later, caution flew for the third time of the race when points leader Simon Pagenaud drifted wide in turn one a hit the outside wall, bringing his day to an end and setting up a potentially huge points gain for his teammate and championship rival Power.

Racing resumed on lap 163 with Ryan Hunter-Reay passing Will Power to move back into the lead. However, going through turn two, Hunter-Reay suddenly lost power, forcing him to pit lane. While he managed to get his car restarted, he fell off of the lead lap due to incident. The lead was handed back to Power, who then began to pull away from the battling duo of Josef Newgarden and Mikhail Aleshin. On lap 176, caution flew for the fourth time of the race, as one of the rear-wing winglets came off of Tony Kanaan's car and fell onto the race course in turn one. This allowed for the final round of pit stops to occur under the caution flag. Power retained the lead of the race, while Sébastien Bourdais jumped into second after electing not to change tires during the stop. Newgarden emerged third and Tony Kanaan fourth. The caution period also allowed Hunter-Reay to get back onto the lead lap.

The final restart of the day came on lap 180. Kanaan managed to jump to second on the start, but was quickly passed by Newgarden and Aleshin by the end of the lap. Further back, Hunter-Reay began to tear through the field, and was already fighting for ninth by lap 182. Lap 183 saw Aleshin, with the handling back to his liking again, pass Newgarden and begin his pursuit of Power. With less than 10 laps to go, Aleshin managed to close the gap down to less than half a second. However, it was not to be, as Power pulled back out to just over a second to take his fourth victory of the 2016 season. In an impressive performance, Hunter-Reay managed to charge back up to take the final step of the podium. Newgarden came across the line fourth, while Bourdais was able to hold on with his aged tires to secure a top five finish. Rookies struggled heavily in the race, with Max Chilton's 13th being the highest amongst the rookies.

Power's victory was the fourth oval victory of his career and his first during the 2016 season. Due to Simon Pagenaud's crash, Power was able to close the points gap between himself and Pagenaud to only 20 points. This in turn, tightened the championship significantly with only three races remaining in the season.

== Results ==
Key	Meaning
R	Rookie
W	Past winner

=== Qualifying ===
Pos	No.	Name	Lap 1 Time	Lap 2 Time	Total Time	Avg. Speed (mph)
1	7	(Russia) Mikhail Aleshin	40.7901	40.8629	1:21.6530	220.445
2	21	(United States) Josef Newgarden	40.8518	40.8938	1:21.7456	220.195
3	14	(Japan) Takuma Sato	40.9058	40.8873	1:21.7931	220.067
4	3	(Brazil) Hélio Castroneves	40.9709	40.9288	1:21.8997	219.781
5	26	(Colombia) Carlos Muñoz	40.9870	40.9628	1:21.9498	219.647
6	5	(Canada) James Hinchcliffe	41.0076	41.0109	1:22.0185	219.463
7	98	(United States) Alexander Rossi R	41.0480	41.0216	1:22.0696	219.326
8	12	(Australia) Will Power	41.0872	41.2487	1:22.3359	218.617
9	10	(Brazil) Tony Kanaan	41.1550	41.1849	1:22.3399	218.606
10	20	(United States) Ed Carpenter	41.3041	41.1045	1:22.4086	218.424
11	15	(United States) Graham Rahal	41.2689	41.2228	1:22.4917	218.204
12	41	(United Kingdom) Jack Hawksworth	41.2919	41.2576	1:22.5495	218.051
13	27	(United States) Marco Andretti	41.2426	41.3217	1:22.5643	218.012
14	22	(France) Simon Pagenaud	41.2078	41.4667	1:22.6745	217.721
15	2	(Colombia) Juan Pablo Montoya W	41.2793	41.5614	1:22.8407	217.284
16	83	(United States) Charlie Kimball	41.4946	41.4865	1:22.9811	216.917
17	8	(United Kingdom) Max Chilton R	41.5076	41.5606	1:23.0682	216.689
18	11	(France) Sébastien Bourdais	41.6428	41.5892	1:23.2320	216.263
19	9	(New Zealand) Scott Dixon W	41.8258	41.7642	1:23.5900	215.337
20	88	(United States) Conor Daly R	41.9102	41.9056	1:23.8158	214.757
21	19	(United Kingdom) Pippa Mann	42.5995	42.6006	1:25.2001	211.267
22	28	(United States) Ryan Hunter-Reay W			No Time	No Speed
OFFICIAL BOX SCORE

=== Race results ===
Pos	No.	Driver	Team	Engine	Laps	Time/Retired	Pit Stops	Grid	Laps Led	Pts.^{1}
1	12	(Australia) Will Power	Team Penske	Chevrolet	200	2:46:28.9856	8	8	55	51
2	7	(Russia) Mikhail Aleshin	Schmidt Peterson Motorsports	Honda	200	+1.1459	8	1	87	44
3	28	(United States) Ryan Hunter-Reay W	Andretti Autosport	Honda	200	+5.9076	9	22	31	36
4	21	(United States) Josef Newgarden	Ed Carpenter Racing	Chevrolet	200	+7.0750	8	2	15	33
5	11	(France) Sébastien Bourdais	KVSH Racing	Chevrolet	200	+7.5285	9	18	3	31
6	9	(New Zealand) Scott Dixon W	Chip Ganassi Racing	Chevrolet	200	+7.8896	9	19	3	29
7	26	(Colombia) Carlos Muñoz	Andretti Autosport	Honda	200	+11.5938	8	5		26
8	2	(Colombia) Juan Pablo Montoya W	Team Penske	Chevrolet	200	+13.4345	9	15		24
9	10	(Brazil) Tony Kanaan	Chip Ganassi Racing	Chevrolet	200	+13.7988	8	9	1	23
10	5	(Canada) James Hinchcliffe	Schmidt Peterson Motorsports	Honda	200	+14.2235	9	6		20
11	15	(United States) Graham Rahal	Rahal Letterman Lanigan Racing	Honda	200	+14.3471	9	11		19
12	27	(United States) Marco Andretti	Andretti Autosport	Honda	200	+16.3334	8	13		18
13	8	(United Kingdom) Max Chilton R	Chip Ganassi Racing	Chevrolet	200	+17.1907	10	17		17
14	41	(United Kingdom) Jack Hawksworth	A. J. Foyt Enterprises	Honda	200	+18.5585	9	12		16
15	83	(United States) Charlie Kimball	Chip Ganassi Racing	Chevrolet	199	+1 Lap	11	16		15
16	88	(United States) Conor Daly R	Dale Coyne Racing	Honda	198	+2 Laps	10	20		14
17	19	(United Kingdom) Pippa Mann	Dale Coyne Racing	Honda	197	+3 Laps	10	21		13
18	22	(France) Simon Pagenaud	Team Penske	Chevrolet	157	Contact	7	14	1	13
19	3	(Brazil) Hélio Castroneves	Team Penske	Chevrolet	63	Contact	4	4		11
20	98	(United States) Alexander Rossi R	Andretti Herta Autosport	Honda	63	Contact	4	7	4	11
21	20	(United States) Ed Carpenter	Ed Carpenter Racing	Chevrolet	57	Mechanical	4	10		9
22	14	(Japan) Takuma Sato	A. J. Foyt Enterprises	Honda	1	Contact	0	3		8
OFFICIAL BOX SCORE

Notes

^{1} Points include 1 point for leading at least 1 lap during a race, an additional 2 points for leading the most race laps, and 1 point for Pole Position.

Source for time gaps:

== Championship standings after the race ==
Drivers' Championship standings

	Pos	Driver	Points
	1	(France) Simon Pagenaud	497
	2	(Australia) Will Power	477
1	3	(United States) Josef Newgarden	397
1	4	(New Zealand) Scott Dixon	386
2	5	(Brazil) Hélio Castroneves	384

- Note: Only the top five positions are included.

== Broadcasting ==
Qualifying and a final practice session were streamed live on the IndyCar YouTube channel.

The race was broadcast by NBCSN. Booth announcers were Brian Till, Townsend Bell, and Paul Tracy. Due to other commitments, Tracy was replaced in the booth for Monday's rescheduled race by Robin Miller. Reporting from the pits were Kevin Lee, Jon Beekhuis, and Katie Hargitt.

The broadcast on Monday attracted 143,000 viewers.

Previous race: 2016 Honda Indy 200	IndyCar Series; 2016 season	Next race: 2016 Firestone 600
Previous race: 2015 ABC Supply 500	ABC Supply 500	Next race: 2017 ABC Supply 500
