= IndyCar Grand Prix of Sonoma =

Indycar Grand Prix of Sonoma

IndyCar Series
- Venue: Sonoma Raceway
- First race: 1970
- First ICS race: 2005
- Last race: 2018
- Distance: 202.725 miles (326.254 km)
- Laps: 85
- Previous names: Golden State 150 (1970); Argent Mortgage Indy Grand Prix (2005); Indy Grand Prix of Sonoma (2006, 2010–2011); Motorola Indy 300 Pres. by Jackson Rancheria Casino & Hotel (2007); Peak Antifreeze & Motor Oil Indy Grand Prix of Sonoma County (2008); Peak Antifreeze Grand Prix of Sonoma County (2009); GoPro Indy Grand Prix of Sonoma (2012–2014); GoPro Grand Prix of Sonoma (2015–2017); INDYCAR Grand Prix of Sonoma (2018)
- Most wins (driver): Will Power, Scott Dixon (3)
- Most wins (team): Team Penske (7)
- Most wins (manufacturer): Chassis: Dallara (14); Engine: Honda (8)

The IndyCar Grand Prix of Sonoma was an IndyCar Series race held at Sonoma Raceway in Sonoma, California. The USAC Championship Car circuit raced at the circuit in 1970. In 2005, American open wheel racing returned to the circuit with an IndyCar Series event. The 2006 event saw rookie Marco Andretti win his first career race. It marked the record youngest winner (19 years, 5 months, 14 days) of a major open-wheel racing event at the time.

The IndyCar Series race utilizes a modified 2.2-mile (3.5 km) version of the road course, the same used by AMA Superbike. The circuit includes the carousel, making it longer than the NASCAR layout, but shorter than the full 2.52-mile (4.06 km) course. This course uses turn 7a of the NASCAR course, but skips the hairpin prior to the front straight. The dragstrip is used instead of the keyhole, adding a high speed section immediately following the exit of the carousel.

For 2012, the course was altered. The back hairpin used the inner loop instead of the outer loop used by NASCAR. Turn nine was widened by ten feet while turn eleven at the hairpin was extended by 200 feet.

From 2015 to 2018, the race had served as the IndyCar season finale.

It was announced on July 13, 2018, that the Monterey Grand Prix at WeatherTech Raceway Laguna Seca would replace Sonoma for the 2019 IndyCar Series season.

== Past winners ==
Season	Date	Driver	Team	Chassis	Engine	Race Distance		Race Time	Average Speed (mph)	Report
Season	Date	Driver	Team	Chassis	Engine	Laps	Miles (km)	Race Time	Average Speed (mph)	Report
USAC Championship Car history
1970	April 4	(United States) Dan Gurney	All American Racers	Eagle	Ford	60	151.2 (243.332)	1:44:26	87.009	Report
1971 – 2004	Not held									
IRL IndyCar Series history
2005	August 28	(Brazil) Tony Kanaan	Andretti Green Racing	Dallara	Honda	80	159.2 (256.207)	2:01:16	91.04	Report
2006	August 27	(United States) Marco Andretti	Andretti Green Racing	Dallara	Honda	80	159.2 (256.207)	1:58:06	93.486	Report
2007	August 26	(New Zealand) Scott Dixon	Chip Ganassi Racing	Dallara	Honda	80	159.2 (256.207)	1:51:59	98.593	Report
2008	August 24	(Brazil) Hélio Castroneves	Penske Racing	Dallara	Honda	80	159.2 (256.207)	1:50:16	100.254	Report
2009	August 23	(United Kingdom) Dario Franchitti	Chip Ganassi Racing	Dallara	Honda	75	166.5 (267.955)	1:49:23	94.745	Report
2010	August 22	(Australia) Will Power	Team Penske	Dallara	Honda	75	166.5 (267.955)	1:52:34	92.063	Report
2011	August 28	(Australia) Will Power	Team Penske	Dallara	Honda	75	166.5 (267.955)	1:47:30	96.408	Report
2012	August 26	(Australia) Ryan Briscoe	Team Penske	Dallara	Chevrolet	85	195.755 (315.037)	2:07:03	95.74	Report
2013	August 25	(Australia) Will Power	Team Penske	Dallara	Chevrolet	85	195.755 (315.037)	2:20:47	86.401	Report
2014	August 24	(New Zealand) Scott Dixon	Chip Ganassi Racing	Dallara	Chevrolet	85	195.755 (315.037)	2:09:21	94.026	Report
2015	August 30	(New Zealand) Scott Dixon	Chip Ganassi Racing	Dallara	Chevrolet	85	195.755 (315.037)	2:09:14	94.117	Report
2016	September 18	(France) Simon Pagenaud	Team Penske	Dallara	Chevrolet	85	195.755 (315.037)	2:00:13	101.181	Report
2017	September 17	(France) Simon Pagenaud	Team Penske	Dallara	Chevrolet	85	202.725 (326.254)	1:55:53	104.968	Report
2018	September 16	(United States) Ryan Hunter-Reay	Andretti Autosport	Dallara	Honda	85	202.725 (326.254)	2:02:19	99.44	Report

=== Support Race History ===
Indy Lights

Season	Date	Winning driver
2005	August 28	(United States) Marco Andretti
2006	August 26	(New Zealand) Wade Cunningham
2006	August 27	(United Kingdom) Alex Lloyd
2007	August 25	(United Kingdom) Alex Lloyd
2007	August 26	(United States) Richard Antinucci
2008	August 23	(France) Franck Perera
2008	August 24	(Chile) Pablo Donoso
2009	August 23	(United States) J. R. Hildebrand
2010	August 22	(France) J. K. Vernay
2014	August 23	(United Kingdom) Jack Harvey
2014	August 24	(United Kingdom) Jack Harvey

Atlantic Championship

Season	Date	Winning driver
1980	May 25	(United States) Tom Gloy
1983	May 8	(United States) Michael Andretti
1984	June 3	(United States) Dan Marvin
1984	September 30	(United States) Dan Marvin
1985	June 2	(United States) Jeff Wood
1985	September 29	(United States) Jeff Wood
1986	June 1	(United States) Rod Bennett
1986	September 28	(Mexico) Roberto Quintanilla
1987	May 31	(United States) Dean Hall
1987	August 2	(United States) Dean Hall
1988	May 29	(United States) Dean Hall
1988	August 14	(United States) Dean Hall
1989	May 7	(United States) R.K. Smith
1989	September 10	(United States) Joe Sposato
1990	May 6	(United States) Mark Dismore
