= Simon Pagenaud =

French racing driver (born 1984)

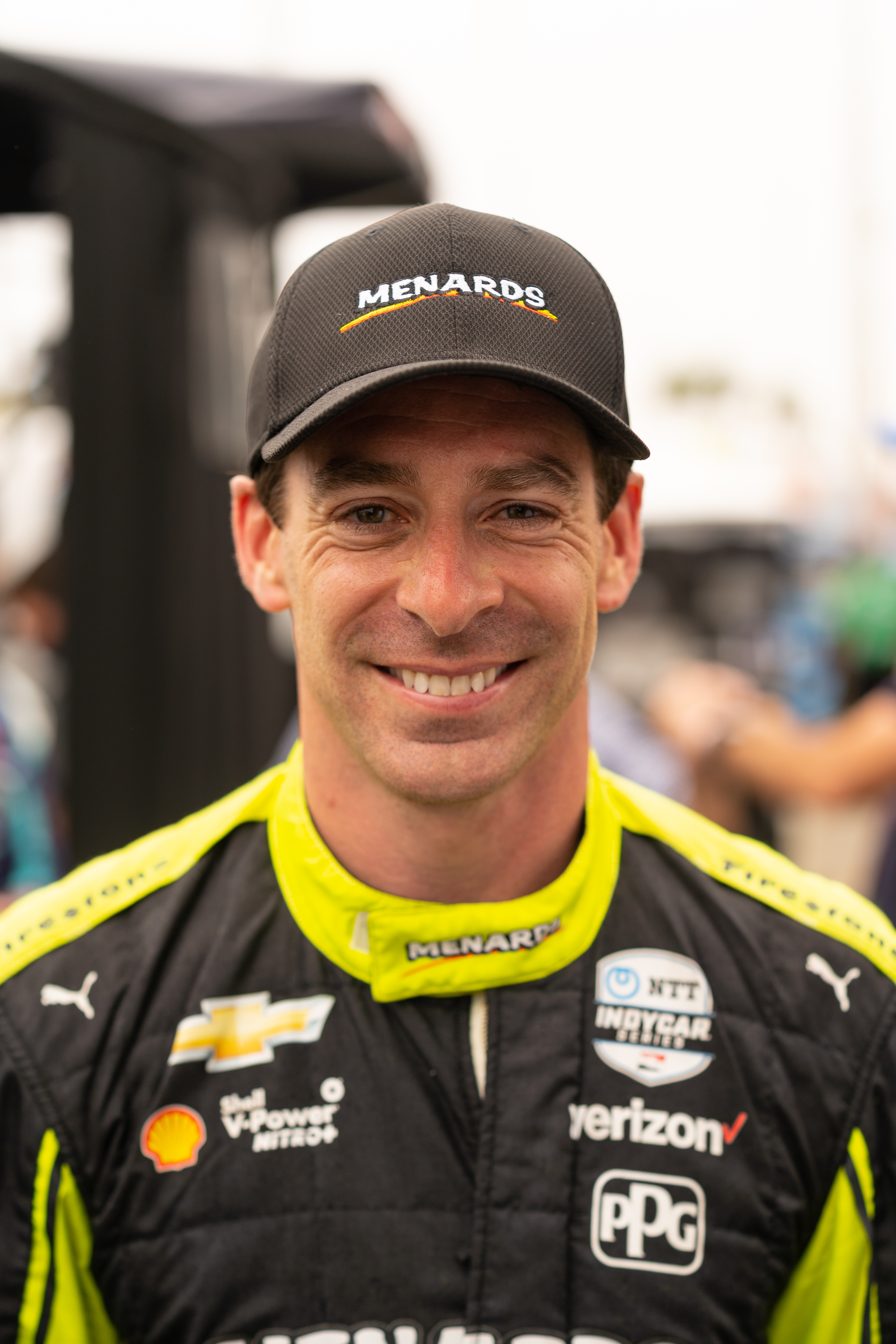
- Pagenaud during the Indycar Long Beach Grand Prix 2021
- Nationality: (France) French
- Born: Simon Pierre Michel Pagenaud; 18 May 1984 (age 42); Montmorillon, France

IndyCar Series career
- 193 races run over 13 years
- 2023 position: 28th
- Best finish: 1st (2016)
- First race: 2011 Indy Grand Prix of Alabama (Barber)
- Last race: 2023 Sonsio Grand Prix at Road America (Elkhart Lake)
- First win: 2013 Chevrolet Detroit Grand Prix, Race 2 (Belle Isle)
- Last win: 2020 Iowa IndyCar 250s, Race 1 (Iowa)
Wins	Podiums	Poles
15	38	13

Champ Car career
- 14 races run over 1 year
- Years active: 2007
- Team: Team Australia
- Best finish: 8th (2007)
- First race: 2007 Vegas Grand Prix (Las Vegas)
- Last race: 2007 Gran Premio Tecate (Mexico City)
Wins	Podiums	Poles
0	0	0

24 Hours of Le Mans career
- Years: 2008–2011
- Teams: Team Oreca-Matmut, Pescarolo Sport, Peugeot Sport
- Best finish: 2nd (2011)
- Categorisation: FIA Platinum

Previous series
- 2014–2015 2010–2011 2009–2011 2008–2011 2007 2006 2005 2002, 2004 2002–2003: United SportsCar Championship; Intercontinental Le Mans Cup; Le Mans Series; American Le Mans Series; Champ Car; Atlantic Championship; Formula Renault 3.5 Series; Formula Renault 2000 Eurocup; French Formula Renault

Championship titles
- 2016 2010 2006: IndyCar Series; American Le Mans Series (LMP1); Atlantic Championship

Awards
- 2012: IndyCar Rookie of the Year

Simon Pierre Michel Pagenaud (French pronunciation: [pa.ʒe.no]; born 18 May 1984) is a French former professional racing driver, who last drove the No. 60 Honda for Meyer Shank Racing in the NTT IndyCar Series. After a successful career in sports car racing that saw him taking the top class championship title in the 2010 American Le Mans Series, he moved to the Indycar Series where he became the 2016 IndyCar champion and the 2019 Indianapolis 500 winner, becoming the first driver born in France to win the Indianapolis 500 since Gaston Chevrolet in 1920 and the first polesitter to have won the race since Helio Castroneves in 2009.

Pagenaud won both the 2022 24 Hours of Daytona and 2023 24 Hours of Daytona with Meyer Shank Racing.

== Early years ==
Born in Montmorillon, Pagenaud first worked at the age of fourteen in the family's supermarket, eventually managing the video game department. After he attended business school, he returned to the supermarket. His family established a driving school that provided the funds for Pagenaud to begin his racing career.

== Career ==
Pagenaud started karting racing around the age of ten. His first major achievement was winning the Volant Elf driver development competition in 2000. In 2001 he moved to a single-seater racing for Formula Renault Campus, finishing as a runner up in the championship.

Pagenaud competed in 2002 and 2003 in French Formula Renault, and in 2002 and 2004 competed in Formula Renault Eurocup. He then moved up to the Formula Renault 3.5 Series in 2005 where he finished sixteenth. In 2006, he went to the United States and won the Champ Car Atlantic with Team Australia in his rookie season by just a few points over Graham Rahal.

With his Atlantic championship, Pagenaud won US$2 million to apply towards a ride in Champ Car in 2007. On 13 February 2007, Pagenaud and Team Australia confirmed that he would be staying with the team, moving up to the Champ Car program. Pagenaud finished eighth in the points standings in what was a very consistent debut season, with three consecutive fourth-place finishes in the Canadian rounds of the championship.

After the demise of the Champ Car World Series, Pagenaud in 2008 moved to the American Le Mans Series co-driving the De Ferran Motorsports Acura ARX-01b LMP2 with former CART champion Gil de Ferran. He finished 14th in the driver's standings.

=== 2009 ===
In 2009, Pagenaud and de Ferran Motorsports took huge steps forward, with the duo taking second place overall in the American Le Mans Series LMP1 class, only 17 points behind drivers David Brabham and Scott Sharp of champions Highcroft Racing. The duo of Pagenaud and de Ferran drove the ARX-01 to three wins over a total of ten races and three pole positions, turning the fastest lap of the ALMS weekend six times.

Also during 2009, Pagenaud drove in the prestigious 24 Hours of Le Mans in LMP1 for the privateer Pescarolo Sport team in the Peugeot FAP 908. The team did not finish the race, completing 210 laps. The race was won by David Brabham, driving in the factory Peugeot Sport Total No. 9 FAP 908 along with former Formula One drivers Alexander Wurz and Marc Gené.

=== 2010 ===
For the 2010 ALMS season, Pagenaud moved over to the Patrón Highcroft racing team, replacing Sharp to co-drive with Brabham in the ARX-01c in LMP1 after Sharp vacated the seat to jump to the ALMS GT2 class with his own Ferrari team. Through four rounds in the 2010 ALMS series, the team of Pagenaud and Brabham lead the LMP1 class with three wins and 91 points.

Pagenaud also earned a seat driving for the Peugeot factory team in 2010 in the prestigious 24 Hours of Le Mans on the renown Circuit de la Sarthe in the Peugeot FAP 908 No. 3 with Pedro Lamy and Sébastien Bourdais.

While the No. 3 Peugeot started from pole, it retired early before nightfall after a mere 38 laps when a suspension mount sheared from the car's tub. The same fate eventually befell the No. 1 Peugeot car of Anthony Davidson/Gene/Wurz while in second place with mere hours left to go in the race, as Audi reclaimed the 24 Hours of Le Mans title it had retained for five years before Peugeot's 2009 win.

During the race, Pagenaud found himself competing against his Highcroft Racing team which traveled to Le Mans for the first time in its history. With Brabham driving the Acura in LMP2 alongside Marino Franchitti and Marco Werner, Highcroft maintained second through most of the race until a cooling issue sidelined the car for much of the race's final four hours.

=== 2014 ===
Pagenaud won the inaugural Grand Prix of Indianapolis on 10 May. This was the first time his father watched him race at the venue.

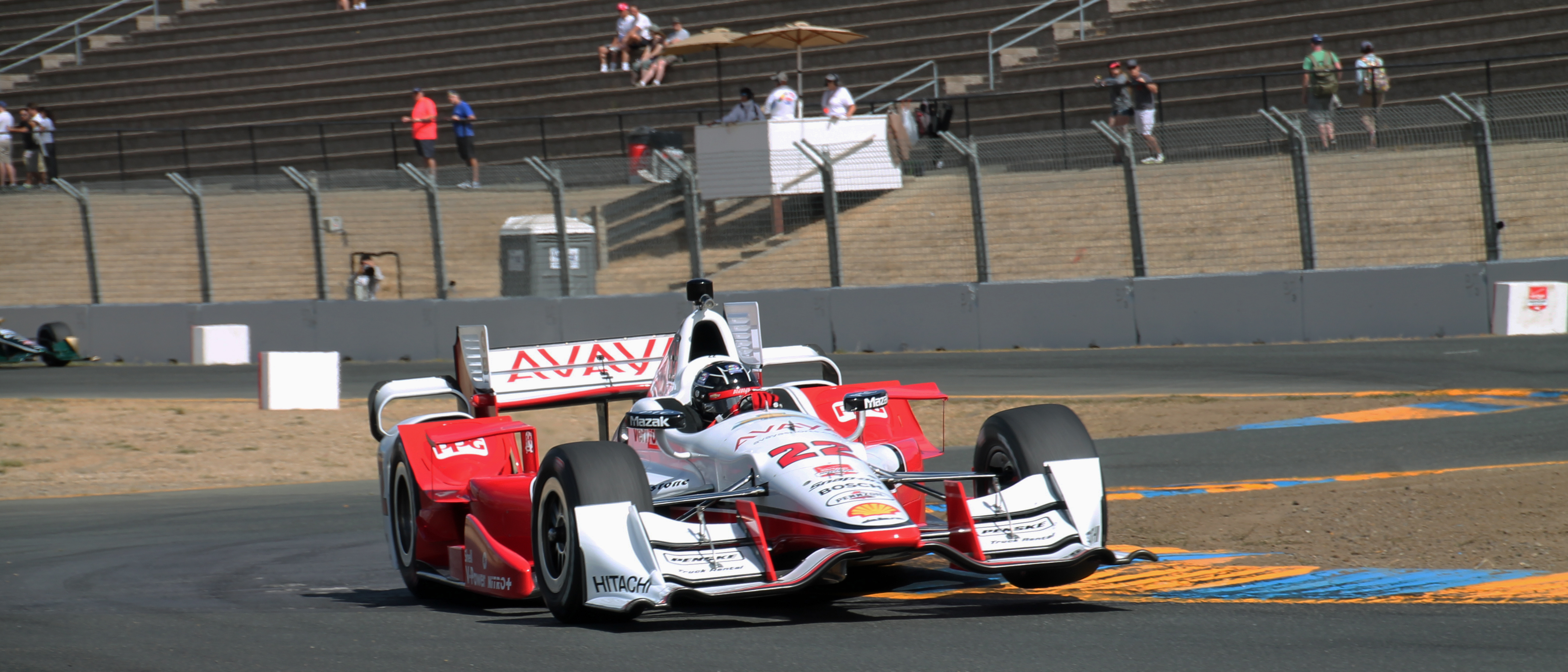
Pagenaud during practice at the 2015 GoPro Grand Prix of Sonoma

=== 2015 ===
Pagenaud moved from Schmidt Peterson Motorsports to Team Penske in 2015. Pagenaud nearly won the 2015 Indianapolis 500, leading with less than thirty laps to go and engaging most of the race in a three-way battle between Scott Dixon and Tony Kanaan. Pagenaud ended up being overtaken by the field and went on to finish tenth, while teammate Juan Pablo Montoya won the race. Pagenaud did not win a race in 2015 but renewed his deal with TEAM Penske in 2016.

=== 2016 ===
Pagenaud got off to the best start of his IndyCar career with five consecutive podiums, including three wins in a row. As the season progressed, Pagenaud and his teammate Will Power became the primary contenders for the championship. With a strong run at the end of the season, Pagenaud took his first IndyCar Series championship victory, giving Team Penske another championship victory in its fiftieth year of racing. He finished the season with five race victories and a total of eight podiums.

=== 2017–2019 ===
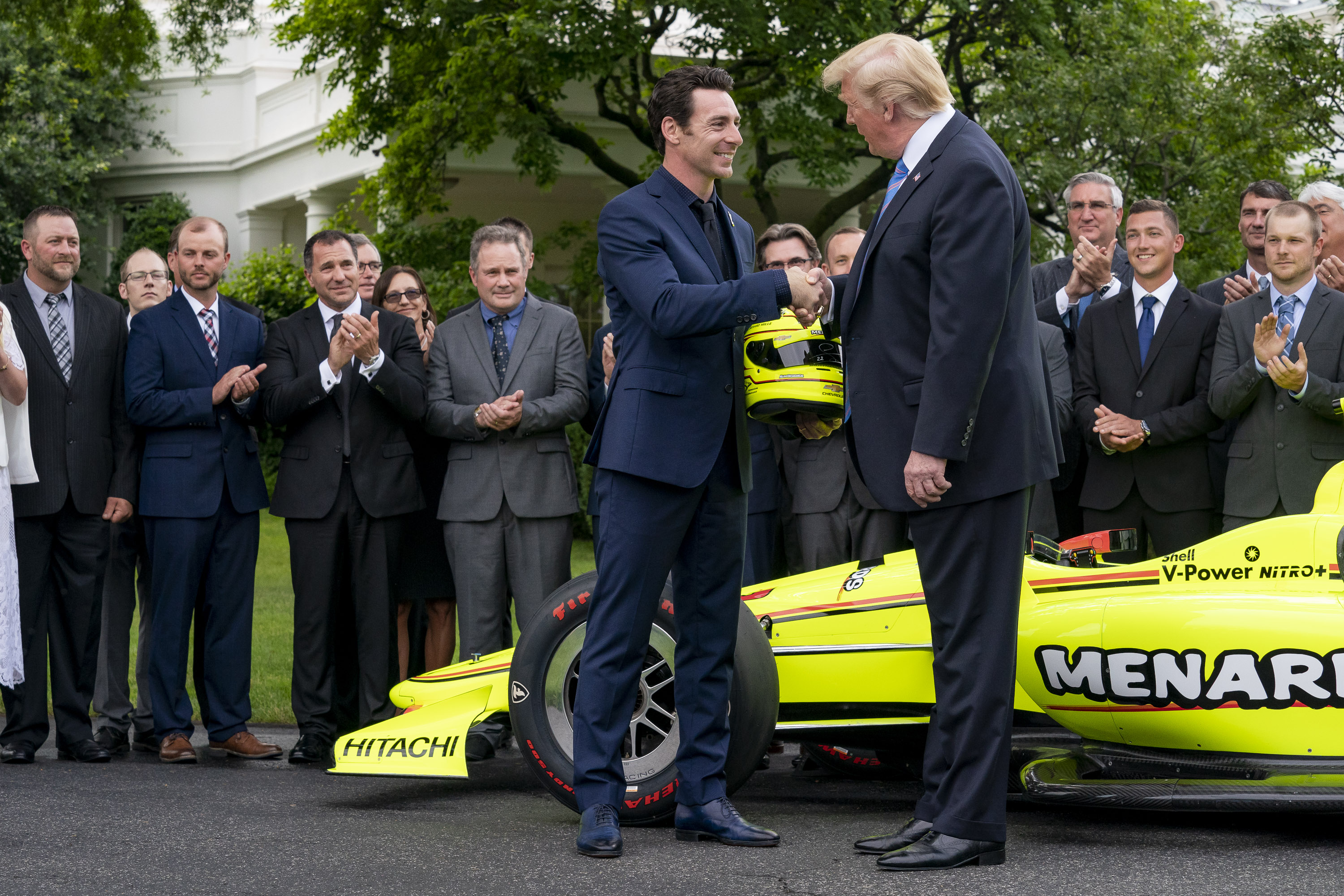
President Donald Trump congratulating Pagenaud for his Indy 500 win at a ceremony at the White House in 2019.

Pagenaud would go winless throughout 2018. Pagenaud won the Grand Prix of Indianapolis and he would also win the 2019 Indianapolis 500 from pole position, the first Frenchman to do so in 99 years. Pagenaud took the championship lead from Team Penske teammate Josef Newgarden, however Newgarden would retake the championship lead one race later in Detroit. Pagenaud would take pole and the win at the 2019 Honda Indy Toronto and took pole at the 2019 Iowa 300, though the win would go to Newgarden. Pagenaud eventually finished the 2019 season in second position.

=== 2020 ===
During the 2020 iRacing virtual Indy 500 event, Pagenaud was accused of deliberately crashing into lead driver Lando Norris, which led to him being accused of bad sportsmanship.

Pagenaud finished second in the first race of the 2020 season at Texas Motor Speedway. Pagenaud finished third at the IndyGP after starting in twentieth.

Due to a fuel pump issue, Pagenaud's Iowa IndyCar 250 at Iowa Speedway race 1 entry failed to make qualifying and started the race at the back of the grid in 23rd. By lap 178, Pagenaud took the lead and held on to win the 250 lap race. This would prove to be his final win in the IndyCar Series.

=== 2021 ===
Pagenaud would enter 2021 as a contract year. 2021 was a difficult year for Pagenaud and Team Penske in general, as the team only recorded three wins of the season with Pagenaud scoring none of them. Pagenaud's best results of the season were two third-place finishes, one at St. Petersburg and the other at the 2021 Indianapolis 500.

Outside of those finishes, Pagenaud would frequently be beset by poor luck and on-track confrontations with his teammates. He would finish eighth in the drivers' standings for the second year in a row. By the end of the season the racing press reported Pagenaud did not intend to re-sign with Team Penske.

=== 2022 ===
After a difficult 2021 campaign, Pagenaud left the Penske team & joined Meyer Shank Racing alongside former Penske teammate, Hélio Castroneves. Despite an encouraging start to the 2022 season which included a second-place finish at the Indy GP, the No. 60 team gradually lost competitiveness as the season continued, culminating in a fifteenth-place points finish for Pagenaud.

=== 2023 ===
In 2023, Pagenaud returned to the 24 Hours of Le Mans, taking part in the LMP2 class for Cool Racing. It would be the first time Pagenaud competed in the race since 2011, where he finished second overall driving for the Peugeot Sport factory team.

During practice for the 2023 Honda Indy 200 at Mid Ohio, Pagenaud suffered a crash in which his car flipped over several times and he ended up in the gravel. Pagenaud credited IndyCar's aeroscreen for saving his life in the crash. Because of injuries he sustained, Pagenaud was forced to sit out the rest of the season. He was replaced in the No. 60 car by Conor Daly for the Honda Indy 200 and the Iowa doubleheader, Tom Blomqvist for the Honda Indy Toronto, the BitNile.com Grand Prix of Portland, and the Firestone Grand Prix of Monterey, and 2022 Indy Lights champion Linus Lundqvist for the Music City Grand Prix, the Gallagher Grand Prix, and the Bommarito Automotive Group 500. Both Blomqvist and Lundqvist made their IndyCar debuts filling in for Pagenaud.

Pagenaud was ultimately dropped from Meyer Shank Racing and replaced by Felix Rosenqvist for the 2024 season. Pagenaud did not return to IndyCar as his injuries from the crash at Mid-Ohio were still lingering and thus prevented him from looking for another seat.

=== Cadillac Formula One Team ===
In 2025, it was announced that Pagenaud had joined the Cadillac Formula One Team as a simulator driver.

== Motorsports career results ==
=== Career summary ===
Season	Series	Team	Races	Wins	Poles	F/laps	Points	Position
2001	Formula Campus by Renault and Elf	Filière FFSA	17	4	6	?	209	**2nd**
2002	Formula Renault 2000 Eurocup	ASM	1	0	0	0	4	25th
2002	Championnat de France FFSA de Formule Renault	ASM	8	1	2	2	93	**3rd**
2003	Formula Renault 2000 Masters	ASM	8	1	0	1	86	**3rd**
2003	Formula Renault 2000 Germany	ASM	2	0	0	0	0	NC
2003	Championnat de France Formule Renault 2000	ASM	10	0	1	1	114	6th
2004	Formula Renault 2000 Eurocup	Graff Racing	17	2	2	2	246	**2nd**
2004	Championnat de France Formula Renault 2.0	Graff Racing	6	3	0	4	142	6th
2005	Formula Renault 3.5 Series	Saulnier Racing	16	0	0	0	30	16th
2005	Championnat de France Formula Renault 2.0	Tech 1 Racing	2	0	0	0	0	NC
2006	Champ Car Atlantic	Team Australia	12	1	1	1	258	**1st**
2007	Champ Car World Series	Team Australia	14	0	0	1	232	8th
2008	24 Hours of Le Mans	Team Oreca-Matmut	1	0	0	0	N/A	NC
2008	American Le Mans Series - LMP2	De Ferran Motorsports	8	0	0	1	85	9th
2009	24 Hours of Le Mans	Pescarolo Sport	1	0	0	0	N/A	NC
2009	American Le Mans Series	De Ferran Motorsports	10	5	3	5	162	**2nd**
2009	Le Mans Series	Team Peugeot Total	1	1	1	1	11	19th
2010	24 Hours of Le Mans	Team Peugeot Total	1	0	0	0	N/A	NC
2010	Le Mans Series	Team Peugeot Total	1	1	0	0	18	21st
2010	Intercontinental Le Mans Cup	Team Peugeot Total	1	0	0	0	—N/a	
2010	American Le Mans Series - LMP/LMP2	Highcroft Racing	9	4	1	4	182	**1st**
2011	IndyCar Series	Dreyer & Reinbold Racing	2	0	0	0	56	31st
2011	IndyCar Series	HVM Racing	1	0	0	0	56	31st
2011	American Le Mans Series	Team Peugeot Total	2	0	0	0	0	NC
2011	American Le Mans Series	Highcroft Racing	2	0	0	0	0	NC
2011	24 Hours of Le Mans	Team Peugeot Total	1	0	0	0	N/A	**2nd**
2011	Le Mans Series	Team Peugeot Total	2	1	1	1	0	NC
2011	Intercontinental Le Mans Cup	Highcroft Racing	5	1	1	1	—N/a	
2011	Intercontinental Le Mans Cup	Team Peugeot Total	5	1	1	1	—N/a	
2011	International V8 Supercar Championship	Garry Rogers Motorsport	2	0	0	0	207	49th
2011	Pacific Formula F Super Series	PR1 Motorsports	2	2	1	2	66	**2nd**
2011	Continental Tire Sports Car Challenge - ST	Compass 360 Racing	1	0	0	0	25	65th
2012	IndyCar Series	Sam Schmidt Motorsports	15	0	0	0	387	5th
2012	American Le Mans Series	Muscle Milk Pickett Racing	1	0	0	0	20	8th
2012	International V8 Supercar Championship	Stone Brothers Racing	2	0	0	0	0	NC
2013	IndyCar Series	Schmidt Peterson Hamilton HP Motorsports	19	2	0	1	508	**3rd**
2013	American Le Mans Series - LMP2	Level 5 Motorsports	2	1	0	1	40	8th
2013	Rolex Sports Car Series	Team Sahlen	1	0	0	0	22	59th
2014	IndyCar Series	Schmidt Peterson Hamilton Motorsports	18	2	1	3	565	5th
2014	United SportsCar Championship - Prototype	Extreme Speed Motorsports	2	0	0	0	52	32nd
2015	IndyCar Series	Team Penske	16	0	1	0	384	11th
2015	United SportsCar Championship - GTLM	Corvette Racing	2	0	0	0	54	18th
2015–16	Andros Trophy - Électrique Class	ERDF	2	0	0	0	44	13th
2016	IndyCar Series	Team Penske	16	5	7	0	659	**1st**
2016	IMSA SportsCar Championship - Prototype	Action Express Racing	2	0	0	0	55	22nd
2017	IndyCar Series	Team Penske	17	2	1	2	629	**2nd**
2017	IMSA SportsCar Championship - Prototype	Team Penske	1	0	0	0	30	30th
2018	IndyCar Series	Team Penske	17	0	0	0	492	6th
2018	IMSA SportsCar Championship -Prototype	Acura Team Penske	3	0	0	0	56	34th
2019	IndyCar Series	Team Penske	17	3	3	1	616	**2nd**
2019	IMSA SportsCar Championship - DPi	Acura Team Penske	3	0	1	0	75	20th
2020	IndyCar Series	Team Penske	14	1	0	1	339	8th
2020	IMSA SportsCar Championship - DPi	Acura Team Penske	3	0	1	1	90	18th
2021	IndyCar Series	Team Penske	16	0	0	0	383	8th
2021	IMSA SportsCar Championship - DPi	Ally Cadillac Racing	4	0	0	1	1203	12th
2022	IndyCar Series	Meyer Shank Racing	17	0	0	1	314	15th
2022	IMSA SportsCar Championship - DPi	Meyer Shank Racing with Curb-Agajanian	1	1	0	0	378	18th
2023	IndyCar Series	Meyer Shank Racing	8	0	0	0	88	28th
2023	IMSA SportsCar Championship - GTP	Meyer Shank Racing with Curb-Agajanian	1	1	1	1	185	26th
2023	24 Hours of Le Mans - LMP2	Cool Racing	1	0	0	0	N/A	DNF
2026	Formula One	Cadillac F1 Team	Simulator driver					

^{*} Season still in progress.

=== Formula Renault 3.5 Series results ===
(key)

Year	Entrant	1	2	3	4	5	6	7	8	9	10	11	12	13	14	15	16	17	DC	Points
2005	Saulnier Racing	ZOL; 1; 8	ZOL; 2; 4	MON; 1; 10	VAL; 1; 5	VAL; 2; 11	LMS; 1; 10	LMS; 2 Ret	BIL; 1; 11	BIL; 2; 12	OSC; 1 Ret	OSC; 2 DNS	DON; 1; 8	DON; 2; 5	EST; 1; 9	EST; 2; 11	MNZ; 1; 11	MNZ; 2; 12	16th	30

=== American open-wheel racing results ===
(key) (Races in bold indicate pole position, races in italics indicate fastest race lap)

==== Champ Car Atlantic ====
Year	Team	1	2	3	4	5	6	7	8	9	10	11	12	Rank	Points
2006	Team Australia	LBH; 4	HOU; 2	MTY; 2	POR; 23	CLE1; 2	**CLE2**; 5	TOR; 4	EDM; 1	SJO; 9	DEN; 3	MTL; 2	ROA; 17	**1st**	**258**

==== Champ Car ====
Year	Team	No.	Chassis	Engine	1	2	3	4	5	6	7	8	9	10	11	12	13	14	Rank	Points	Ref
2007	Team Australia	15	Panoz DP01	Cosworth XFE	LVG; 12	LBH; 14	HOU; 5	POR; 8	CLE; 5	MTT; 4	TOR; 4	EDM; 4	SJO; 10	ROA; 11	ZOL; 12	ASN; 6	SRF; 5	MXC; 6	**8th**	**232**	

==== IndyCar Series ====
Year	Team	No.	Chassis	Engine	1	2	3	4	5	6	7	8	9	10	11	12	13	14	15	16	17	18	19	Rank	Points	Ref
2011	Dreyer & Reinbold Racing	24	Dallara IR-05	Honda	STP	ALA; 8	LBH	SAO	INDY	TXS	TXS	MIL	IOW	TOR	EDM									31st	56	
2011	Dreyer & Reinbold Racing	22	Dallara IR-05	Honda												MOH; 13	NHM							31st	56	
2011	HVM Racing	78	Dallara IR-05	Honda														SNM; 15	BAL	MOT	KTY	LVS^{1} C		31st	56	
2012	Schmidt–Hamilton Motorsports	77	Dallara DW12	Honda	STP; 6	ALA; 5	LBH; 2	SAO; 12	INDY; 16	DET; 3	TXS; 6	MIL; 12	IOW; 5	TOR; 12	EDM; 20	MOH; 3	SNM; 7	BAL; 3	FON; 15					5th	387	
2013	Schmidt–Hamilton Motorsports	77	Dallara DW12	Honda	STP; 24	ALA; 6	LBH; 8	SAO; 9	INDY; 8	DET; 12	DET; 1	TXS; 13	MIL; 12	IOW; 6	POC; 6	TOR; 9	TOR; 12	MOH; 2	SNM; 5	BAL; 1	HOU; 4	HOU; 6	FON; 13	3rd	508	
2014	Schmidt Peterson Motorsports	77	Dallara DW12	Honda	STP; 5	LBH; 5	ALA; 4	IMS; 1	INDY; 12	DET; 22	DET; 6	TXS; 4	**HOU**; 16	HOU; 1	POC; 6	IOW; 11	TOR; 4	TOR; 22	MOH; 9	MIL; 7	SNM; 3	FON; 20		5th	565	
2015	Team Penske	22	Dallara DW12	Chevrolet	STP; 5	NLA; 20	LBH; 4	ALA; 9	IMS; 25	INDY; 10	DET; 3	DET; 14	TXS; 11	TOR; 11	**FON**; 9	MIL; 9	IOW; 14	MOH; 3	POC; 7	SNM; 16				11th	384	
2016	Team Penske	22	Dallara DW12	Chevrolet	STP; 2	PHX; 2	LBH; 1	**ALA**; 1	**IMS**; 1	INDY; 19	**DET**; 13	**DET**; 2	ROA; 13	**IOW**; 4	TOR; 9	**MOH**; 1	POC; 18	TXS; 4	WGL; 7	**SNM**; 1				1st	659	
2017	Team Penske	1	Dallara DW12	Chevrolet	STP; 2	LBH; 5	ALA; 3	PHX; 1	IMS; 4	INDY; 14	DET; 16	DET; 5	TXS; 3	ROA; 4	IOW; 7	**TOR**; 5	MOH; 4	POC; 4	GTW; 3	WGL; 9	SNM; 1			2nd	629	
2018	Team Penske	22	Dallara DW12	Chevrolet	STP; 13	PHX; 10	LBH; 24	ALA; 9	IMS; 8	INDY; 6	DET; 17	DET; 10	TXS; 2	ROA; 7	IOW; 8	TOR; 2	MOH; 8	POC; 8	GTW; 4	POR; 6	SNM; 4			6th	492	
2019	Team Penske	22	Dallara DW12	Chevrolet	STP; 7	COA; 19	ALA; 9	LBH; 6	IMS; 1	**INDY**; 1	DET; 6	DET; 17	TXS; 6	ROA; 9	**TOR**; 1	**IOW**; 4	MOH; 6	POC; 3	GTW; 5	POR; 7	LAG; 4			2nd	616	
2020	Team Penske	22	Dallara DW12	Chevrolet	TXS; 2	IMS; 3	ROA; 12	ROA; 13	IOW; 1	IOW; 4	INDY; 22	GTW; 19	GTW; 16	MOH; 18	MOH; 6	IMS; 16	IMS; 10	STP; 6						8th	339	
2021	Team Penske	22	Dallara DW12	Chevrolet	ALA; 12	STP; 3	TXS; 10	TXS; 6	IMS; 6	INDY; 3	DET; 12	DET; 8	ROA; 18	MOH; 14	NSH; 21	IMS; 16	GTW; 8	POR; 21	LAG; 8	LBH; 5				8th	383	
2022	Meyer Shank Racing	60	Dallara DW12	Honda	STP; 15	TXS; 8	LBH; 19	ALA; 11	IMS; 2	INDY; 8	DET; 9	ROA; 12	MOH; 10	TOR; 7	IOW; 23	IOW; 23	IMS; 25	NSH; 9	GTW; 20	POR; 23	LAG; 17			15th	314	
2023	Meyer Shank Racing	60	Dallara DW12	Honda	STP; 26	TXS; 17	LBH; 15	ALA; 18	IMS; 25	INDY; 25	DET; 13	ROA; 14	MOH; Wth	TOR	IOW	IOW	NSH	IMS	GTW	POR	LAG			28th	88	

^{1} The Las Vegas Indy 300 was abandoned after Dan Wheldon died from injuries sustained in a 15-car crash on lap 11.

==== Indianapolis 500 ====
Year	Chassis	Engine	Start	Finish	Team
2012	Dallara	Honda	23	16	Schmidt–Hamilton HP Motorsports
2013	Dallara	Honda	21	8	Schmidt Peterson Hamilton HP Motorsports
2014	Dallara	Honda	5	12	Schmidt Peterson Hamilton Motorsports
2015	Dallara	Chevrolet	3	10	Team Penske
2016	Dallara	Chevrolet	8	19	Team Penske
2017	Dallara	Chevrolet	23	14	Team Penske
2018	Dallara	Chevrolet	2	6	Team Penske
2019	Dallara	Chevrolet	**1**	**1**	Team Penske
2020	Dallara	Chevrolet	25	22	Team Penske
2021	Dallara	Chevrolet	26	3	Team Penske
2022	Dallara	Honda	16	8	Meyer Shank Racing
2023	Dallara	Honda	22	25	Meyer Shank Racing

=== Sports car racing ===
==== Le Mans 24 Hours results ====
Year	Team	Co-drivers	Car	Class	Laps	Pos.	Class pos.
2008	(France) Team Oreca-Matmut	(Switzerland) Marcel Fässler (France) Olivier Panis	Courage-Oreca LC70-Judd	LMP1	147	DNF	DNF
2009	(France) Pescarolo Sport	(France) Jean-Christophe Boullion (France) Benoît Tréluyer	Peugeot 908 HDi FAP	LMP1	210	DNF	DNF
2010	(France) Team Peugeot Total	(France) Sébastien Bourdais (Portugal) Pedro Lamy	Peugeot 908 HDi FAP	LMP1	38	DNF	DNF
2011	(France) Team Peugeot Total	(France) Sébastien Bourdais (Portugal) Pedro Lamy	Peugeot 908	LMP1	355	**2nd**	**2nd**
2023	(Switzerland) Cool Racing	(France) Reshad de Gerus; Vladislav Lomko	Oreca 07-Gibson	LMP2	158	DNF	DNF

==== American Le Mans Series results ====
Year	Entrant	Class	Chassis	Engine	1	2	3	4	5	6	7	8	9	10	11	Rank	Points
2008	De Ferran Motorsports	LMP2	Acura ARX-01b	Acura 3.4L V8	SEB	STP	LBH	UTA; 3	LIM; 7	MOH; Ret	ROA; 8	MOS; 5	DET; 3	PET; 5	MON; 2	9th	85
2009	De Ferran Motorsports	LMP1	Acura ARX-02a	Acura 4.0L V8	SEB; Ret	STP; Ret	LBH; 1	UTA; 1	LIM; 1	MOH; 1	ROA; 2	MOS; 2	PET; 7	MON; 1		2nd	162
2010	Highcroft Racing	LMP2	HPD ARX-01C	HPD 3.4L V8	SEB; 2								PET; 1			1st	182
2010	Highcroft Racing	LMP	HPD ARX-01C	HPD 3.4L V8		LBH; 1	MON; 1	UTA; 1	LIM; 2	MOH; 2	ROA; 3	MOS; 2				1st	182
2011	Highcroft Racing	LMP1	HPD ARX-01e	HPD 3.4L V8	SEB; 2	LBH	LIM	MOS	MOH	ROA	BAL	MON				NC	0^{1}
2011	Peugeot Sport Total	LMP1	Peugeot 908	Peugeot HDI 3.7 L Turbo V8 (Diesel)									PET; 11			NC	0^{1}
2012	Muscle Milk Pickett Racing	P1	HPD ARX-03a	Honda 3.4 L V8	SEB; 2	LBH	MON	LIM	MOS	MOH	ROA	BAL	VIR	PET		8th	20
2013	Level 5 Motorsports	P2	HPD ARX-03b	Honda HR28TT 2.8 L Turbo V6	SEB; 2	LBH	MON	LIM	MOS	ROA	BAL	COA	VIR	PET		6th	20

^{1} Driver competed for the Intercontinental Le Mans Cup, no points awarded for the American Le Mans Series.

==== IMSA SportsCar Championship results ====
(key) (Races in bold indicate pole position)

Year	Team	No.	Class	Make	Engine	1	2	3	4	5	6	7	8	9	10	11	Rank	Points
2014	Extreme Speed Motorsports	2	P	HPD ARX-03b	Honda HR28TT 2.8 L V6 Turbo	DAY; 7	SEB; 5	LBH	LGA	DET	WGL	MOS	IMS	ELK	COA	PET	32nd	52
2015	Corvette Racing	4	GTLM	Chevrolet Corvette C7.R	Chevrolet 5.5 L V8	DAY; 3	SEB; 9	LBH	LGA	WGL	MOS	ELK	VIR	COA	PET		18th	54
2016	Action Express Racing	31	P	Coyote Corvette DP	Chevrolet 5.5L V8	DAY; 6	SEB	LBH	LGA	DET	WGL	MOS	ELK	COA	PET; 4		22nd	55
2017	Team Penske	6	P	Oreca 07	Gibson GK428 4.2 L V8	DAY	SEB	LBH	COA	DET	WGL	MOS	ELK	LGA	PET; 3		30th	30
2018	Acura Team Penske	6	P	Acura ARX-05	Acura AR35TT 3.5 L Turbo V6	DAY; 10	SEB; 14	LBH	MOH	DET	WGL	MOS	ELK	LGA	PET; 13		34th	56
2019	Acura Team Penske	6	DPi	Acura ARX-05	Acura AR35TT 3.5 L Turbo V6	DAY; 6	**SEB**; 9	LBH	MOH	DET	WGL	MOS	ELK	LGA	PET; 4		20th	75
2020	Acura Team Penske	6	DPi	Acura ARX-05	Acura AR35TT 3.5 L Turbo V6	DAY; 4	DAY	SEB	ELK	ATL	MOH	**PET**; 3	LGA	SEB; 2			17th	90
2021	Ally Cadillac Racing	48	DPi	Cadillac DPi-V.R	Cadillac 5.5 L V8	DAY; 2	SEB; 7	MOH	DET	WGL; 5	WGL	ELK	LGA	LBH	PET; 4		12th	1203
2022	Meyer Shank Racing with Curb-Agajanian	60	DPi	Acura ARX-05	Acura AR35TT 3.5 L Turbo V6	DAY; 1	SEB	LBH	LGA	MOH	DET	WGL	MOS	ELK	PET		18th	378
2023	Meyer Shank Racing with Curb-Agajanian	60	GTP	Acura AR24e 2.4 L Turbo V6	Acura AR24e 2.4 L V6	**DAY**; 1	SEB	LBH	LGA	WGL	MOS	ELK	IMS	PET			26th	185

^{*} Season still in progress.

==== Le Mans Series results ====
Year	Entrant	Class	Chassis	Engine	1	2	3	4	5	Rank	Points
2009	Team Peugeot Total	LMP1	Peugeot 908 HDi FAP	Peugeot HDI 5.5 L Turbo V12 (Diesel)	CAT	SPA; 1	ALG	NÜR	SIL	19th	11
2010	Team Peugeot Total	LMP1	Peugeot 908 HDi FAP	Peugeot HDI 5.5 L Turbo V12 (Diesel)	CAS	SPA; 1	ALG	HUN	SIL	21st	18
2011	Team Peugeot Total	LMP1	Peugeot 908	Peugeot HDI 3.7 L Turbo V8 (Diesel)	CAS	SPA; 8	IMO	SIL^{1} 1	EST	NC	0

^{1} Driver competed for the Intercontinental Le Mans Cup, no points awarded for the Le Mans Series.

==== Intercontinental Le Mans Cup results ====
Year	Entrant	Class	Chassis	Engine	1	2	3	4	5	6	7
2010	Team Peugeot Total	LMP1	Peugeot 908 HDi FAP	Peugeot HDI 5.5 L Turbo V12 (Diesel)	SIL	PET^{1} 1	ZHU; 4				
2011	Highcroft Racing	LMP1	HPD ARX-01e	HPD 3.4L V8	SEB^{1} 2						
2011	Peugeot Sport Total	LMP1	Peugeot 908	Peugeot HDI 3.7 L Turbo V8 (Diesel)		SPA^{1} 8	LMS^{1} 2	IMO	SIL; 1	PET; 11	ZHU

^{1} Driver did not run for the Intercontinental Le Mans Cup.

=== Touring car racing ===
==== Complete V8 Supercar results ====
Year	Team	1	2	3	4	5	6	7	8	9	10	11	12	13	14	15	16	17	18	19	20	21	22	23	24	25	26	27	28	29	30	31	Final pos	Points
2011	Garry Rogers Motorsport	YMC; R1	YMC; R2	ADE; R3	ADE; R4	HAM; R5	HAM; R6	BAR; R7	BAR; R8	BAR; R9	WIN; R10	WIN; R11	HID; R12	HID; R13	TOW; R14	TOW; R15	QLD; R16	QLD; R17	QLD; R18	PHI; Q	PHI; R19	BAT; R20	SUR; R21; 10	SUR; R22; 3	SYM; R23	SYM; R24	SAN; R25	SAN; R26	SYD; R27	SYD; R28			49th	207
2012	Stone Brothers Racing	ADE; R1	ADE; R2	SYM; R3	SYM; R4	HAM; R5	HAM; R6	BAR; R7	BAR; R8	BAR; R9	PHI; R10	PHI; R11	HID; R12	HID; R13	TOW; R14	TOW; R15	QLD; R16	QLD; R17	SMP; R18	SMP; R19	SAN; Q	SAN; R20	BAT; R21	SUR; R22; Ret	SUR; R23; 8	YMC; R24	YMC; R25	YMC; R26	WIN; R27	WIN; R28	SYD; R29	SYD; R30	NC	0 +

+ Not Eligible for points

Sporting positions
Preceded by Charles Zwolsman Jr.	Toyota Atlantic Championship; Champion; 2006	Succeeded by Raphael Matos
Preceded by David Brabham; Scott Sharp	American Le Mans Series; Champion; 2010; With: David Brabham	Succeeded by Guy Smith; Chris Dyson
Preceded by James Hinchcliffe	IndyCar Series; Rookie of the Year; 2012	Succeeded by Tristan Vautier
Preceded by Scott Dixon	IndyCar Series; Champion; 2016	Succeeded by Josef Newgarden
Preceded by Will Power	Indianapolis 500 Winner; 2019	Succeeded by Takuma Sato
