= 2016 IndyCar Series =

American auto racing season

2016 IndyCar season
- Verizon IndyCar Series

Season
- Races: 16
- Start date: March 13
- End date: September 17

Awards
- Drivers' champion: (France) Simon Pagenaud
- Manufacturers' Cup: (United States) Chevrolet
- Rookie of the Year: (United States) Alexander Rossi
- Indianapolis 500 winner: (United States) Alexander Rossi

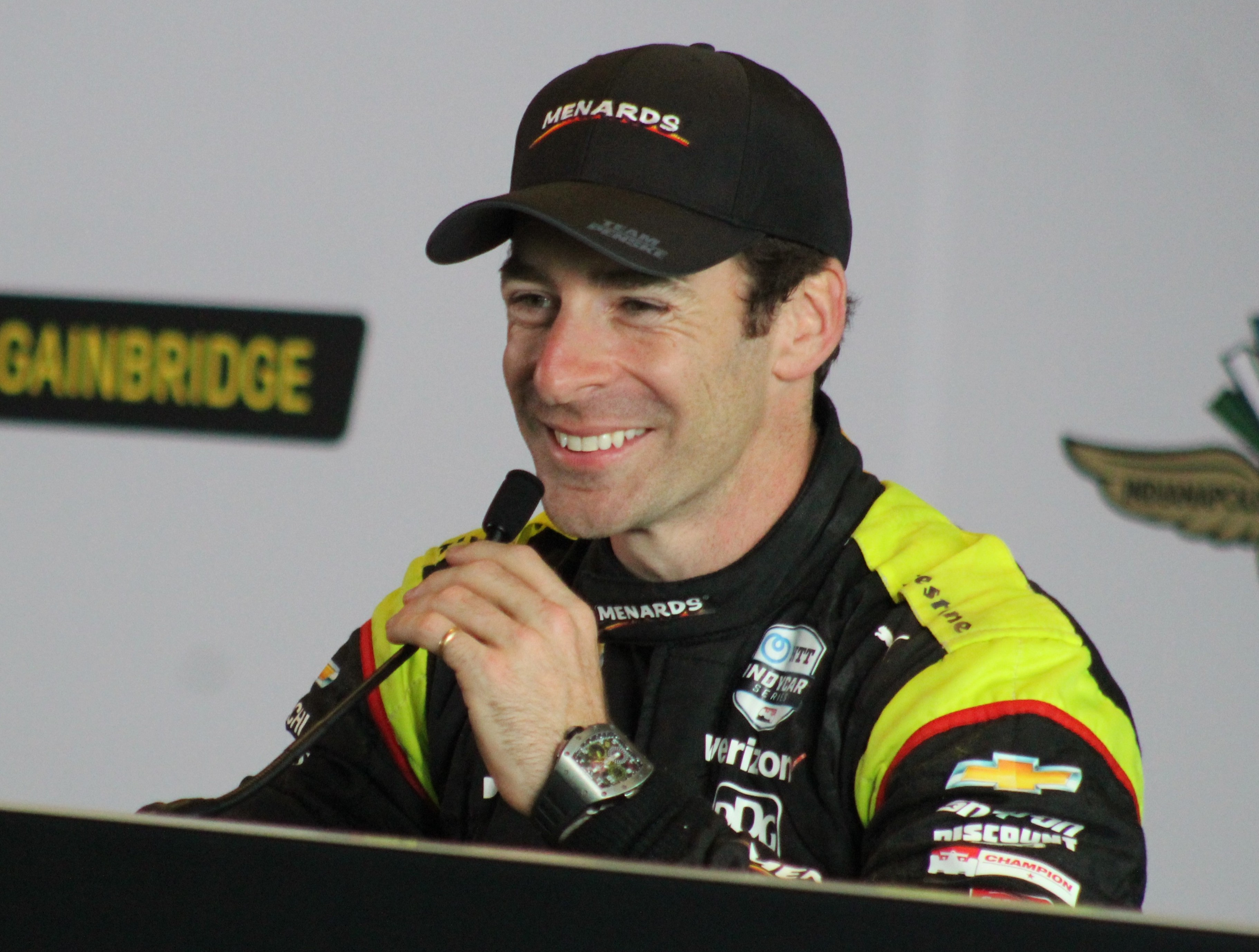
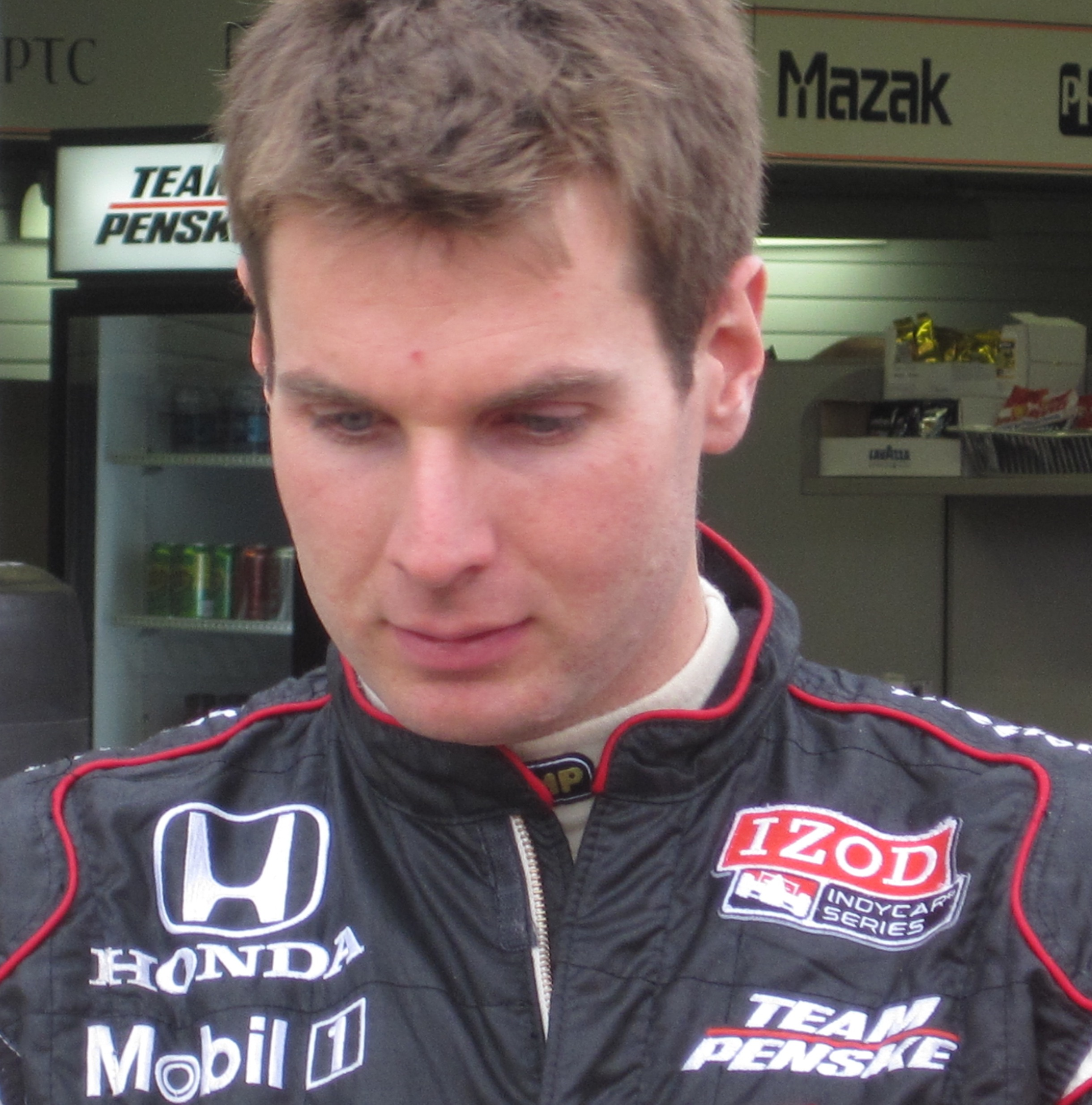
Simon Pagenaud (left) won his first Drivers' Championship while Will Power (right) finished second in the championship.

The 2016 Verizon IndyCar Series was the 21st season of the IndyCar Series and the 105th season of American open-wheel racing. It included the 100th running of the Indianapolis 500. Scott Dixon entered as the reigning Drivers' Champion, while Chevrolet entered the season as the reigning Manufacturer's Champion. Upon season's end, Simon Pagenaud was crowned Drivers' Champion, while Chevrolet retained the Manufacturer's Championship.

Pagenaud was the first European driver to win IndyCar Series driver's title since British driver Dario Franchitti in 2011 season.

== Confirmed entries ==
The following teams, entries, and drivers have been announced to compete in the 2016 Verizon IndyCar Series season. All teams will use a spec Dallara DW12 chassis with manufacturer aero kits and Firestone tires.

| Team | Engine | No. | Driver(s) | Rounds |
|---|---|---|---|---|
| A. J. Foyt Enterprises | Honda | 14 | (Japan) Takuma Sato | All |
| A. J. Foyt Enterprises | Honda | 35 | (Canada) Alex Tagliani | 5–6 |
| A. J. Foyt Enterprises | Honda | 41 | (United Kingdom) Jack Hawksworth | All |
| Andretti Autosport | Honda | 26 | (Colombia) Carlos Muñoz | All |
| Andretti Autosport | Honda | 27 | (United States) Marco Andretti | All |
| Andretti Autosport | Honda | 28 | (United States) Ryan Hunter-Reay | All |
| Andretti Autosport | Honda | 29 | (United States) Townsend Bell | 6 |
| Andretti Herta Autosport with Curb Agajanian | Honda | 98 | (United States) Alexander Rossi R | All |
| Chip Ganassi Racing | Chevrolet | 8 | (United Kingdom) Max Chilton R | All |
| Chip Ganassi Racing | Chevrolet | 9 | (New Zealand) Scott Dixon | All |
| Chip Ganassi Racing | Chevrolet | 10 | (Brazil) Tony Kanaan | All |
| Chip Ganassi Racing | Chevrolet | 83 | (United States) Charlie Kimball | All |
| Dale Coyne Racing | Honda | 18 | (United States) Conor Daly R (Note: Not considered rookie for Indy 500.) | All |
| Dale Coyne Racing | Honda | 19 | (Italy) Luca Filippi | 1–4, 11 |
| Dale Coyne Racing | Honda | 19 | (Colombia) Gabby Chaves | 5–10, 14 |
| Dale Coyne Racing | Honda | 19 | (United States) R. C. Enerson R | 12, 15–16 |
| Dale Coyne Racing | Honda | 19 | (United Kingdom) Pippa Mann | 13 |
| Dale Coyne Racing | Honda | 63 | (United Kingdom) Pippa Mann | 6 |
| Dale Coyne / Jonathan Byrd's Racing | Honda | 88 | (United States) Bryan Clauson R | 6 |
| Dreyer & Reinbold Racing | Chevrolet | 24 | (United States) Sage Karam | 6 |
| Ed Carpenter Racing | Chevrolet | 6 | (United States) J. R. Hildebrand | 5–6 |
| Ed Carpenter Racing | Chevrolet | 20 | (United States) Ed Carpenter | 2, 6, 10, 13–14 |
| Ed Carpenter Racing | Chevrolet | 20 | (United States) Spencer Pigot R | 7–9, 11–12, 15–16 |
| Ed Carpenter Racing | Chevrolet | 21 | (United States) Josef Newgarden | All |
| KVSH Racing | Chevrolet | 11 | (France) Sébastien Bourdais | All |
| KVSH Racing | Chevrolet | 25 | (United Kingdom) Stefan Wilson R | 6 |
| Pirtek Team Murray | Chevrolet | 61 | (Australia) Matthew Brabham R (Note: Team to get support from KVSH Racing.) | 5–6 |
| Lazier Burns Racing | Chevrolet | 4 | (United States) Buddy Lazier | 6 |
| Rahal Letterman Lanigan Racing | Honda | 15 | (United States) Graham Rahal | All |
| Rahal Letterman Lanigan Racing | Honda | 16 | (United States) Spencer Pigot R | 1, 5–6 |
| Schmidt Peterson Motorsports | Honda | 5 | (Canada) James Hinchcliffe | All |
| Schmidt Peterson Motorsports | Honda | 7 | (Russia) Mikhail Aleshin | All |
| Schmidt Peterson Motorsports with Marotti Autosport | Honda | 77 | (Spain) Oriol Servià | 6 |
| Team Penske | Chevrolet | 2 | (Colombia) Juan Pablo Montoya | All |
| Team Penske | Chevrolet | 3 | (Brazil) Hélio Castroneves | All |
| Team Penske | Chevrolet | 12 | (Spain) Oriol Servià | 1 |
| Team Penske | Chevrolet | 12 | (Australia) Will Power | All (Note: Replaced for race at St. Petersburg after winning pole by Servia due to inner-ear infection.) |
| Team Penske | Chevrolet | 22 | (France) Simon Pagenaud | All |

=== Notes ===
- Bryan Clauson ran the Indianapolis 500 for the 3rd and final time for Jonathan Byrd's Racing. Clauson would attempt to race in more than 200 races in 2016 among IndyCar, sprint cars and midgets but would tragically fall short of that because on August 6, 2016, Clauson was involved in a midget car crash at Belleville High Banks Speedway in Belleville, Kansas, and died the following night.
- Ryan Hunter-Reay, Carlos Muñoz and Marco Andretti signed with Andretti Autosport for the 2016 and 2017 seasons. The team confirmed Townsend Bell for the Indianapolis 500.
- Carpenter Fisher Hartman Racing became Ed Carpenter Racing for the 2016 season. Both Josef Newgarden and Ed Carpenter remained with the team, with only Newgarden running the full schedule. The team confirmed J. R. Hildebrand for the GP of Indy and the Indianapolis 500. ECR would add Indy Lights champion Spencer Pigot to drive the No. 20 for the road/street courses beginning at Detroit.
- Rahal Letterman Lanigan Racing ran only one car full-time in 2016 with Graham Rahal, but ran Indy Lights champion Spencer Pigot in three races (St. Petersburg, GP of Indy, and Indianapolis 500).
- Team Penske returned with the same four drivers as the 2015 season.
- Chip Ganassi Racing retained Scott Dixon, Tony Kanaan and Charlie Kimball, but neither Sage Karam nor Sebastián Saavedra returned to the team. The team later confirmed former Manor Marussia driver Max Chilton, who drove a partial Indy Lights schedule in 2015, as their fourth driver.
- Schmidt Peterson Motorsports confirmed the return of James Hinchcliffe to the team. Mikhail Aleshin returned to the team for the full season, replacing James Jakes. Oriol Servià drove the team's third entry in the Indianapolis 500 with support from Marotti Racing.
- PIRTEK Team Murray confirmed that the team would race the Grand Prix of Indianapolis and Indianapolis 500 with driver Matthew Brabham. The team had support from KVSH Racing.
- KVSH Racing confirmed the return of Sébastien Bourdais with the team. Stefano Coletti did not return for the team. Stefan Wilson drove the No. 25 for the Indianapolis 500.
- Dale Coyne Racing confirmed that Conor Daly and Luca Filippi would run the full season. Pippa Mann returned to the team for the Indianapolis 500. The team confirmed Gabby Chaves for the Grand Prix of Indianapolis and Indianapolis 500.
- A. J. Foyt Enterprises confirmed the return of Takuma Sato and Jack Hawksworth to the team. The team confirmed Alex Tagliani for the Grand Prix of Indy and the Indianapolis 500.
- Dreyer & Reinbold Racing reunited with Sage Karam for the Indianapolis 500.
- Lazier Partners Racing confirmed the return of Buddy Lazier to the Indianapolis 500.
- On February 18, Bryan Herta Autosport confirmed their alliance with fellow Honda team Andretti Autosport. The team was run out of Andretti's shop in Indianapolis. Separately, due to a sponsor default, the team was unable to retain 2014 Indy Lights Champion Gabby Chaves. The team would confirm former Caterham and Manor Racing driver Alexander Rossi to drive the No. 98 for the season.
- IndyCar announced on February 24, 2016, the hiring of three race stewards; former drivers Arie Luyendyk and Max Papis and longtime motorsports executive Dan Davis.
- On May 15, 2016, information was revealed that Charlie Kimball would be using car number 42 instead of his usual 83 for the Indianapolis 500. This came as a promotion by Novo Nordisk and Chip Ganassi Racing that also involved Kyle Larson and Ganassi's NASCAR team. The official announcement came May 16, 2016.
- On June 12, 2016, Josef Newgarden suffered a fractured clavicle and wrist in an accident during the Firestone 600. Ed Carpenter Racing announced the following day that J. R. Hildebrand would fill in for Newgarden until he recovered from his injuries. However, Newgarden recovered enough from his injuries that he was able to compete in the following race at Road America.
- On July 21, 2016, Dale Coyne Racing announced that R. C. Enerson would make his IndyCar debut driving for the team at Mid-Ohio. The team later signed Enerson to drive the final two races of the season.

== Schedule ==
The 2016 Verizon IndyCar Series schedule was announced on October 27, 2015. All rounds were held in the United States, except the Toronto round.

| Icon | Legend |
|---|---|
| O | Oval/Speedway |
| R | Road course |
| S | Street circuit |

| Rd. | Date | Race Name | Track | City |
|---|---|---|---|---|
| 1 | March 13 | Firestone Grand Prix of St. Petersburg | S Streets of St. Petersburg | St. Petersburg, Florida |
| 2 | April 2 | Desert Diamond West Valley Phoenix Grand Prix | O Phoenix International Raceway | Avondale, Arizona |
| 3 | April 17 | Toyota Grand Prix of Long Beach | S Streets of Long Beach | Long Beach, California |
| 4 | April 24 | Honda Indy Grand Prix of Alabama | R Barber Motorsports Park | Birmingham, Alabama |
| 5 | May 14 | Angie's List Grand Prix of Indianapolis | R Indianapolis Motor Speedway Road Course | Speedway, Indiana |
| 6 | May 29 | 100th Indianapolis 500 presented by PennGrade | O Indianapolis Motor Speedway | Speedway, Indiana |
| 7 | June 4 | Chevrolet Dual in Detroit presented by Quicken Loans | S The Raceway at Belle Isle Park | Detroit, Michigan |
| 8 | June 5 | Chevrolet Dual in Detroit presented by Quicken Loans | S The Raceway at Belle Isle Park | Detroit, Michigan |
| 9* | June 12/August 27* | Firestone 600 | O Texas Motor Speedway | Fort Worth, Texas |
| 10 | June 26 | Kohler Grand Prix | R Road America | Elkhart Lake, Wisconsin |
| 11 | July 10 | Iowa Corn 300 | O Iowa Speedway | Newton, Iowa |
| 12 | July 17 | Honda Indy Toronto | S Exhibition Place | Toronto, Ontario |
| 13 | July 31 | Honda Indy 200 | R Mid-Ohio Sports Car Course | Lexington, Ohio |
| 14 | August 22* | ABC Supply 500 | O Pocono Raceway | Long Pond, Pennsylvania |
| 15 | September 4 | Grand Prix at The Glen | R Watkins Glen International | Watkins Glen, New York |
| 16 | September 18 | GoPro Grand Prix of Sonoma | R Sonoma Raceway | Sonoma, California |

=== Replaced event ===
| Race name | Track | City | Original date |
|---|---|---|---|
| Grand Prix of Boston | S Streets of Boston | Boston, Massachusetts | September 4 |

=== Schedule changes and notes ===
- The Grand Prix of Boston was announced in late May 2015. The race was scheduled to be run on Labor Day Weekend on September 4, 2016. The proposed street circuit was based in the Boston Seaport District. On April 29, 2016, Boston newspapers reported that the race had been canceled.
- Grand Prix of St. Petersburg was run on March 11–13.
- Autódromo Hermanos Rodríguez was also rumored to start the 2016 season with a race in February, but did not materialize.
- IndyCar did not return to NOLA Motorsports Park, Auto Club Speedway, and the Milwaukee Mile in 2016 following financial difficulties exposed shortly after the 2015 running of the former event.
- Toronto returned to its original July date as a single race weekend.
- Road America's return to an open-wheel calendar was announced on August 8, 2015. The race was run on June 26, 2016.
- IndyCar returned to Phoenix International Raceway for the first time since 2005.
- IndyCar officials explored the possibility of returning to Gateway Motorsports Park; a deal was eventually reached for the track to return for the 2017 season.
- Texas Motor Speedway confirmed that the Verizon IndyCar Series would run on June 11, 2016. However, the race was postponed to the following afternoon due to persistent rain. It was further halted after 71 laps due to more rain and the rest of the race was postponed until August 27. The 248 lap race resumed starting at lap 72. This would lead to updates for the track regarding drainage and repaving in time for 2017's events.
- IndyCar returned to Pocono Raceway on August 21.
- In an interview with Mark Miles, Iowa Speedway was said to be set for July 10.
- In a November 2 press release, IndyCar announced a two-day promoter test at Phoenix International Raceway, scheduled for February 26–27, in preparation for the series’ return to the 1-mile oval. The Phoenix promoter test in February was the only one not in conjunction with a typical race weekend schedule. The other promoter test days were: March 11 at St. Petersburg, April 22 at Barber Motorsports Park, May 12 at the Indianapolis Motor Speedway road course, June 24 at Road America, July 29 at Mid-Ohio Sports Car Course, and September 16 at Sonoma Raceway.
- IndyCar CEO Mark Miles said in an interview that IndyCar was working on replacing the Boston race on Labor Day and specifically stated that Gateway Motorsports Park and Watkins Glen International were being considered as replacement venues. On May 13, 2016, IndyCar announced that Watkins Glen would replace Boston.

== Results ==
| Rd. | Race | Pole position | Fastest lap | Most laps led | Race Winner | | | Report |
| Rd. | Race | Pole position | Fastest lap | Most laps led | Driver | Team | Manufacturer | Report |
|---|---|---|---|---|---|---|---|---|
| 1 | St. Petersburg | (Australia) Will Power | (United States) Josef Newgarden | (France) Simon Pagenaud | (Colombia) Juan Pablo Montoya | Team Penske | Chevrolet | Report |
| 2 | Phoenix | (Brazil) Hélio Castroneves | (Brazil) Tony Kanaan | (New Zealand) Scott Dixon | (New Zealand) Scott Dixon | Chip Ganassi Racing | Chevrolet | Report |
| 3 | Long Beach | (Brazil) Hélio Castroneves | (United States) Charlie Kimball | (Brazil) Hélio Castroneves | (France) Simon Pagenaud | Team Penske | Chevrolet | Report |
| 4 | Birmingham | (France) Simon Pagenaud | (New Zealand) Scott Dixon | (France) Simon Pagenaud | (France) Simon Pagenaud | Team Penske | Chevrolet | Report |
| 5 | Indianapolis GP | (France) Simon Pagenaud | (United States) Alexander Rossi | (France) Simon Pagenaud | (France) Simon Pagenaud | Team Penske | Chevrolet | Report |
| 6 | Indianapolis 500 | (Canada) James Hinchcliffe | (United States) Alexander Rossi | (United States) Ryan Hunter-Reay | (United States) Alexander Rossi | Andretti Herta Autosport | Honda | Report |
| 7 | Detroit 1 | (France) Simon Pagenaud | (New Zealand) Scott Dixon | (France) Simon Pagenaud | (France) Sébastien Bourdais | KVSH Racing | Chevrolet | Report |
| 8 | Detroit 2 | (France) Simon Pagenaud | (United States) Josef Newgarden | (France) Simon Pagenaud | (Australia) Will Power | Team Penske | Chevrolet | Report |
| 9 | Road America | (Australia) Will Power | (United Kingdom) Max Chilton | (Australia) Will Power | (Australia) Will Power | Team Penske | Chevrolet | Report |
| 10 | Iowa | (France) Simon Pagenaud | (United States) Josef Newgarden | (United States) Josef Newgarden | (United States) Josef Newgarden | Ed Carpenter Racing | Chevrolet | Report |
| 11 | Toronto | (New Zealand) Scott Dixon | (Brazil) Hélio Castroneves | (New Zealand) Scott Dixon | (Australia) Will Power | Team Penske | Chevrolet | Report |
| 12 | Mid-Ohio | (France) Simon Pagenaud | (Australia) Will Power | (Russia) Mikhail Aleshin | (France) Simon Pagenaud | Team Penske | Chevrolet | Report |
| 13 | Pocono | (Russia) Mikhail Aleshin | (Australia) Will Power | (Russia) Mikhail Aleshin | (Australia) Will Power | Team Penske | Chevrolet | Report |
| 14 | Texas | (Colombia) Carlos Muñoz | (New Zealand) Scott Dixon | (Canada) James Hinchcliffe | (United States) Graham Rahal | Rahal Letterman Lanigan Racing | Honda | Report |
| 15 | Watkins Glen | (New Zealand) Scott Dixon | (Brazil) Tony Kanaan | (New Zealand) Scott Dixon | (New Zealand) Scott Dixon | Chip Ganassi Racing | Chevrolet | Report |
| 16 | Sonoma | (France) Simon Pagenaud | (Brazil) Tony Kanaan | (France) Simon Pagenaud | (France) Simon Pagenaud | Team Penske | Chevrolet | Report |

== Points standings ==
- Ties are broken by number of wins, followed by number of 2nds, 3rds, etc., then by number of pole positions, followed by number of times qualified 2nd, etc.

=== Driver standings ===
- One championship point is awarded to each driver who leads at least one race lap. Two additional championship points are awarded to the driver who leads most laps during a race.
- At all races except the Indy 500, the number 1 qualifier earns one point.
- Entrant-initiated engine change-outs before the engines reach their required distance run will result in the loss of ten points.

| Pos | Driver | STP | PHX | LBH | BAR | IGP | INDY | BEL | | ROA | IOW | TOR | MOH | POC | TMS | WGL | SON | Pts |
|---|---|---|---|---|---|---|---|---|---|---|---|---|---|---|---|---|---|---|
| 1 | (France) Simon Pagenaud | 2* | 2 | 1 | **1*** | **1*** | 19^{8} | **13*** | **2*** | 13 | **4** | 9 | **1** | 18 | 4 | 7 | **1*** | 659 |
| 2 | (Australia) Will Power | **Wth** | 3 | 7 | 4 | 19 | 10^{6} | 20 | 1 | **1*** | 2 | 1 | 2 | 1 | 8 | 20 | 20 | 532 |
| 3 | (Brazil) Hélio Castroneves | 4 | **11** | **3*** | 7 | 2 | 11^{9} | 5 | 14 | 5 | 13 | 2 | 15 | 19 | 5 | 3 | 7 | 504 |
| 4 | (United States) Josef Newgarden | 22 | 6 | 10 | 3 | 21 | 3^{2} | 14 | 4 | 8 | 1* | 22 | 10 | 4 | 22 | 2 | 6 | 502 |
| 5 | (United States) Graham Rahal | 16 | 5 | 15 | 2 | 4 | 14^{26} | 4 | 11 | 3 | 16 | 13 | 4 | 11 | 1 | 21 | 2 | 484 |
| 6 | (New Zealand) Scott Dixon | 7 | 1* | 2 | 10 | 7 | 8^{13} | 19 | 5 | 22 | 3 | **8*** | 22 | 6 | 19 | **1*** | 17 | 477 |
| 7 | (Brazil) Tony Kanaan | 9 | 4 | 6 | 8 | 25 | 4^{18} | 9 | 7 | 2 | 7 | 4 | 12 | 9 | 3 | 19 | 13 | 461 |
| 8 | (Colombia) Juan Pablo Montoya | 1 | 9 | 4 | 5 | 8 | 33^{17} | 3 | 20 | 7 | 20 | 20 | 11 | 8 | 9 | 13 | 3 | 433 |
| 9 | (United States) Charlie Kimball | 10 | 12 | 11 | 9 | 5 | 5^{16} | 8 | 16 | 6 | 10 | 11 | 8 | 15 | 6 | 6 | 9 | 433 |
| 10 | (Colombia) Carlos Muñoz | 8 | 22 | 12 | 14 | 12 | 2^{5} | 6 | 15 | 10 | 12 | 17 | 3 | 7 | **7** | 11 | 15 | 432 |
| 11 | (United States) Alexander Rossi RY | 12 | 14 | 20 | 15 | 10 | 1^{11} | 10 | 12 | 15 | 6 | 16 | 14 | 20 | 11 | 8 | 5 | 430 |
| 12 | (United States) Ryan Hunter-Reay | 3 | 10 | 18 | 11 | 9 | 24*^{3} | 7 | 3 | 4 | 22 | 12 | 18 | 3 | 13 | 14 | 4 | 428 |
| 13 | (Canada) James Hinchcliffe | 19 | 18 | 8 | 6 | 3 | **7**^{1} | 18 | 21 | 14 | 9 | 3 | 5 | 10 | 2* | 18 | 12 | 416 |
| 14 | (France) Sébastien Bourdais | 21 | 8 | 9 | 16 | 24 | 9^{19} | 1 | 8 | 18 | 8 | 7 | 20 | 5 | 10 | 5 | 10 | 404 |
| 15 | (Russia) Mikhail Aleshin | 5 | 17 | 16 | 17 | 13 | 27^{7} | 15 | 17 | 16 | 5 | 6 | 17* | **2*** | 16 | 22 | 11 | 347 |
| 16 | (United States) Marco Andretti | 15 | 13 | 19 | 12 | 15 | 13^{14} | 16 | 9 | 12 | 14 | 10 | 13 | 12 | 12 | 12 | 8 | 339 |
| 17 | (Japan) Takuma Sato | 6 | 15 | 5 | 13 | 18 | 26^{12} | 11 | 10 | 17 | 11 | 5 | 9 | 22 | 20 | 17 | 14 | 320 |
| 18 | (United States) Conor Daly R | 13 | 16 | 13 | 20 | 6 | 29^{24} | 2 | 6 | 21 | 21 | 15 | 6 | 16 | 21 | 4 | 21 | 313 |
| 19 | (United Kingdom) Max Chilton R | 17 | 7 | 14 | 21 | 14 | 15^{22} | 21 | 22 | 20 | 19 | 18 | 16 | 13 | 15 | 10 | 16 | 267 |
| 20 | (United Kingdom) Jack Hawksworth | 11 | 19 | 21 | 19 | 20 | 16^{31} | 22 | 19 | 11 | 15 | 21 | 21 | 14 | 17 | 16 | 18 | 229 |
| 21 | (United States) Spencer Pigot R | 14 | | | | 11 | 25^{29} | 17 | 18 | 9 | | 19 | 7 | | | 15 | 22 | 165 |
| 22 | (Colombia) Gabby Chaves | | | | | 17 | 20^{21} | 12 | 13 | 19 | 17 | | | | 14 | | | 121 |
| 23 | (United States) J. R. Hildebrand | | | | | 22 | 6^{15} | | | | | | | | | | | 84 |
| 24 | (Spain) Oriol Servià | 18 | | | | | 12^{10} | | | | | | | | | | | 72 |
| 25 | (United States) Ed Carpenter | | 21 | | | | 31^{20} | | | | 18 | | | 21 | 18 | | | 67 |
| 26 | (Italy) Luca Filippi | 20 | 20 | 17 | 18 | | | | | | | 14 | | | | | | 61 |
| 27 | (United States) Townsend Bell | | | | | | 21^{4} | | | | | | | | | | | 55 |
| 28 | (United States) R. C. Enerson R | | | | | | | | | | | | 19 | | | 9 | 19 | 55 |
| 29 | (United Kingdom) Pippa Mann | | | | | | 18^{25} | | | | | | | 17 | | | | 46 |
| 30 | (Australia) Matthew Brabham R | | | | | 16 | 22^{26} | | | | | | | | | | | 37 |
| 31 | (Canada) Alex Tagliani | | | | | 23 | 17^{33} | | | | | | | | | | | 35 |
| 32 | (United States) Sage Karam | | | | | | 32^{23} | | | | | | | | | | | 22 |
| 33 | (United States) Bryan Clauson R | | | | | | 23^{28} | | | | | | | | | | | 21 |
| 34 | (United Kingdom) Stefan Wilson R | | | | | | 28^{30} | | | | | | | | | | | 14 |
| 35 | (United States) Buddy Lazier | | | | | | 30^{32} | | | | | | | | | | | 12 |
| Pos | Driver | STP | PHX | LBH | BAR | IGP | INDY | BEL | | ROA | IOW | TOR | MOH | POC | TMS | WGL | SON | Pts |

| Color | Result |
|---|---|
| Gold | Winner |
| Silver | 2nd place |
| Bronze | 3rd place |
| Green | 4th & 5th place |
| Light Blue | 6th–10th place |
| Dark Blue | Finished (Outside Top 10) |
| Purple | Did not finish |
| Red | Did not qualify (DNQ) |
| Brown | Withdrawn (Wth) |
| Black | Disqualified (DSQ) |
| White | Did Not Start (DNS) |
| White | Race abandoned (C) |
| Blank | Did not participate |

**In-line notation**
| **Bold** | Pole position (1 point; except Indy) |
| Italics | Ran fastest race lap |
| * | Led most race laps (2 points) |
| DNS | Any driver who qualifies but does not start (DNS), earns half the points had they taken part. |
| ^{1–33} | Indy 500 qualifying results, with points as follows: 42 points for 1st 40 points for 2nd and so on down to 1 point for 33rd. |
| ^{c} | Qualifying canceled no bonus point awarded |
RY Rookie of the Year
R Rookie

=== Entrant standings ===
- Based on the entrant, used for oval qualifications order, and starting grids when qualifying is cancelled.
- Only full-time entrants, and at-large part-time entrants shown.

| Pos | Driver | STP | PHX | LBH | BAR | IGP | INDY | BEL | | ROA | IOW | TOR | MOH | POC | TMS | WGL | SON | Pts |
|---|---|---|---|---|---|---|---|---|---|---|---|---|---|---|---|---|---|---|
| 1 | #22 Team Penske | 2* | 2 | 1 | **1*** | **1*** | 19^{8} | **13*** | **2*** | 13 | **4** | 9 | **1** | 18 | 4 | 7 | **1*** | 659 |
| 2 | #12 Team Penske | **18** | 3 | 7 | 4 | 19 | 10^{6} | 20 | 1 | **1*** | 2 | 1 | 2 | 1 | 8 | 20 | 20 | 544 |
| 3 | #3 Team Penske | 4 | **11** | **3*** | 7 | 2 | 11^{9} | 5 | 14 | 5 | 13 | 2 | 15 | 19 | 5 | 3 | 7 | 504 |
| 4 | #21 Ed Carpenter Racing | 22 | 6 | 10 | 3 | 21 | 3^{2} | 14 | 4 | 8 | 1* | 22 | 10 | 4 | 22 | 2 | 6 | 502 |
| 5 | #15 Rahal Letterman Lanigan Racing | 16 | 5 | 15 | 2 | 4 | 14^{26} | 4 | 11 | 3 | 16 | 13 | 4 | 11 | 1 | 21 | 2 | 484 |
| 6 | #9 Chip Ganassi Racing | 7 | 1* | 2 | 10 | 7 | 8^{13} | 19 | 5 | 22 | 3 | **8*** | 22 | 6 | 19 | **1*** | 17 | 477 |
| 7 | #10 Chip Ganassi Racing | 9 | 4 | 6 | 8 | 25 | 4^{18} | 9 | 7 | 2 | 7 | 4 | 12 | 9 | 3 | 19 | 13 | 461 |
| 8 | #2 Team Penske | 1 | 9 | 4 | 5 | 8 | 33^{17} | 3 | 20 | 7 | 20 | 20 | 11 | 8 | 9 | 13 | 3 | 433 |
| 9 | #83 Chip Ganassi Racing | 10 | 12 | 11 | 9 | 5 | 5^{16} | 8 | 16 | 6 | 10 | 11 | 8 | 15 | 6 | 6 | 9 | 433 |
| 10 | #26 Andretti Autosport | 8 | 22 | 12 | 14 | 12 | 2^{5} | 6 | 15 | 10 | 12 | 17 | 3 | 7 | **7** | 11 | 15 | 432 |
| 11 | #98 Andretti Herta Autosport with Curb Agajanian | 12 | 14 | 20 | 15 | 10 | 1^{11} | 10 | 12 | 15 | 6 | 16 | 14 | 20 | 11 | 8 | 5 | 430 |
| 12 | #28 Andretti Autosport | 3 | 10 | 18 | 11 | 9 | 24*^{3} | 7 | 3 | 4 | 22 | 12 | 18 | 3 | 13 | 14 | 4 | 428 |
| 13 | #5 Schmidt Peterson Motorsports | 19 | 18 | 8 | 6 | 3 | **7**^{1} | 18 | 21 | 14 | 9 | 3 | 5 | 10 | 2* | 18 | 12 | 416 |
| 14 | #11 KVSH Racing | 21 | 8 | 9 | 16 | 24 | 9^{19} | 1 | 8 | 18 | 8 | 7 | 20 | 5 | 10 | 5 | 10 | 404 |
| 15 | #7 Schmidt Peterson Motorsports | 5 | 17 | 16 | 17 | 13 | 27^{7} | 15 | 17 | 16 | 5 | 6 | 17* | **2*** | 16 | 22 | 11 | 347 |
| 16 | #27 Andretti Autosport | 15 | 13 | 19 | 12 | 15 | 13^{14} | 16 | 9 | 12 | 14 | 10 | 13 | 12 | 12 | 12 | 8 | 339 |
| 17 | #14 A. J. Foyt Enterprises | 6 | 15 | 5 | 13 | 18 | 26^{12} | 11 | 10 | 17 | 11 | 5 | 9 | 22 | 20 | 17 | 14 | 320 |
| 18 | #18 Dale Coyne Racing | 13 | 16 | 13 | 20 | 6 | 29^{24} | 2 | 6 | 21 | 21 | 15 | 6 | 16 | 21 | 4 | 21 | 313 |
| 19 | #8 Chip Ganassi Racing | 17 | 7 | 14 | 21 | 14 | 15^{22} | 21 | 22 | 20 | 19 | 18 | 16 | 13 | 15 | 10 | 16 | 267 |
| 20 | #19 Dale Coyne Racing | 20 | 20 | 17 | 18 | 17 | 20^{21} | 12 | 13 | 19 | 17 | 14 | 19 | 17 | 14 | 9 | 19 | 250 |
| 21 | #41 A. J. Foyt Enterprises | 11 | 19 | 21 | 19 | 20 | 16^{31} | 22 | 19 | 11 | 15 | 21 | 21 | 14 | 17 | 16 | 18 | 229 |
| 22 | #20 Ed Carpenter Racing | | 21 | | | | 31^{20} | 17 | 18 | 9 | 18 | 19 | 7 | 21 | 18 | 15 | 22 | 182 |
| Pos | Driver | STP | PHX | LBH | BAR | IGP | INDY | BEL | | ROA | IOW | TOR | MOH | POC | TMS | WGL | SON | Pts |

=== Manufacturer standings ===
| Pos | Manufacturer | STP | PHX | LBH | BAR | IGP | INDY | BEL | | ROA | IOW | TOR | MOH | POC | TMS | WGL | SON | Bonus | Penalties | Points |
|---|---|---|---|---|---|---|---|---|---|---|---|---|---|---|---|---|---|---|---|---|
| 1 | Chevrolet | 1 | 1 | 1 | 1 | 1 | 3 | 1 | 1 | 1 | 1 | 1 | 1 | 1 | 3 | 1 | 1 | – | – | 1992 |
| 1 | Chevrolet | 2 | 2 | 2 | 3 | 2 | 4 | 3 | 2 | 2 | 2 | 2 | 2 | 4 | 4 | 2 | 3 | – | – | 1992 |
| 1 | Chevrolet | 4 | 3 | 3 | 4 | 5 | 5 | 5 | 4 | 5 | 3 | 4 | 7 | 5 | 5 | 3 | 6 | – | – | 1992 |
| 1 | Chevrolet | **125*** | **128*** | **128*** | **120*** | **123*** | 194 | **118*** | **125*** | **123*** | **128*** | **125*** | **117** | 112 | 97 | **128*** | **229*** | – | – | 1992 |
| 2 | Honda | 3 | 5 | 5 | 2 | 3 | 1 | 2 | 3 | 3 | 5 | 3 | 3 | 2 | 1 | 4 | 2 | – | – | 1697 |
| 2 | Honda | 5 | 10 | 8 | 6 | 4 | 2 | 4 | 6 | 4 | 6 | 5 | 4 | 3 | 2 | 8 | 4 | – | – | 1697 |
| 2 | Honda | 6 | 13 | 12 | 11 | 6 | 7 | 6 | 9 | 10 | 9 | 6 | 5 | 7 | 7 | 9 | 5 | – | – | 1697 |
| 2 | Honda | 93 | 67 | 72 | 87 | 95 | **234*** | 100 | 85 | 87 | 80 | 93 | 99* | **104*** | **119*** | 78 | 204 | – | – | 1697 |

- The top three finishing drivers from each manufacturer in each race/qualifying score championship points for their respective manufacturer, provided they were using one of their four allotted engines.
- Two additional points are awarded to the manufacturer if one of their entrants leads most laps of a race.
- At all races except the Indy 500, the manufacturer who qualifies on pole earns one point.
- Manufacturers will earn ten points for each engine reaching the 2500-mile change-out threshold. Manufacturers will lose twenty points for each engine failing to reach the change-out threshold, or for a non-minor repair requiring a component change.
- Ties are broken by number of wins, followed by number of 2nds, 3rds, etc., then by number of pole positions, followed by number of times qualified 2nd, etc.

== See also ==
- 2016 Indy Lights
- 2016 Pro Mazda Championship
- 2016 U.S. F2000 National Championship
