= 2016 GoPro Grand Prix of Sonoma =

(United States) 2016 Sonoma
Race details
16th round of the 2016 IndyCar Series season
← Previous race
- Date: September 18, 2016
- Official name: GoPro Grand Prix of Sonoma
- Location: Sonoma Raceway
- Course: Permanent racing facility 2.2 mi / 3.5 km
- Distance: 85 laps 195.755 mi / 315.037 km

Pole position
- Driver: (France) Simon Pagenaud (Team Penske)
- Time: 1:16.2565

Fastest lap
- Driver: (Brazil) Tony Kanaan (Chip Ganassi Racing)
- Time: 1:19.2623 (on lap 70 of 85)

Podium
- First: (France) Simon Pagenaud (Team Penske)
- Second: (United States) Graham Rahal (Rahal Letterman Lanigan Racing)
- Third: (Colombia) Juan Pablo Montoya (Team Penske)

The 2016 GoPro Grand Prix of Sonoma was the 16th and final round of the 2016 IndyCar Series season. The race was contested on September 18, 2016, on the IndyCar layout of Sonoma Raceway in Sonoma, California. It marked the 12th time that the series had visited the circuit. For the second year in a row, the event served as the season finale for the IndyCar Series.

== Background ==
For the second year in a row, Sonoma Raceway served as the IndyCar Series Finale. As such, the event was one of two during the 2016 season worth double points (the other being the Indianapolis 500).

Entering the race weekend, the battle for the championship had been reduced to only two drivers: Simon Pagenaud and Will Power. Pagenaud held a 43-point advantage over Power, meaning that any finish of fourth or higher for Pagenaud would automatically secure his championship victory.

== Report ==
=== Qualifying ===
Qualifying was held on Saturday, August 17. Simon Pagenaud led a Team Penske 1-2-3-4, setting a time of 1:16.2565 to best his teammate Hélio Castroneves. It marked the seventh time on the season that Pagenaud had qualified on pole. Pagenaud's pole also gave him one bonus point, thus extending the gap between him and Power to 44 points. Power qualified in fourth. Graham Rahal was the best amongst non-Penske drivers, taking fifth place on the grid.

=== Race ===
The start of the race saw Simon Pagenaud jump ahead of Hélio Castroneves, while Will Power was able to pass Juan Pablo Montoya to move into third place. Graham Rahal rounded out the top five. Further back in the field, contact occurred between Tony Kanaan and Mikhail Aleshin in turn seven, sending Aleshin into a spin and causing Kanaan to stall. However, both drivers were able to get going again before the field came back around, so no full course caution was necessary. Up front, though, Pagenaud steadily increased his lead over the field.

The first round of pit stops ranged from roughly laps 10-15. While Pagenaud easily held his lead, Power was able to leapfrog Castroneves during the sequence, putting him second place on the track. However, the gained position did not help Power make up ground, as Pagenaud continued to increase his lead. On lap 29, Castroneves returned to the pit lane in an attempt to go on an alternate pit stop strategy.

On lap 36, the most dramatic moment of the race came when Power's car suddenly ground to a halt on the course just before the pit entrance. A malfunctioning clutch control unit prevented Power from shifting gears and eventually forced him into neutral, causing his car to grind to a halt. While he would eventually be able to continue, it would not be until he had already lost 8 laps, thus ending any chance Power still had at winning the championship. The lone caution of the race flew for this incident. Both Pagenaud and Montoya were able to make it into the pits prior to the caution flying, though, allowing Pagenaud to maintain his lead, while Montoya managed to come back out in sixth. After pit stops were done, the running order was Pagenaud, Castroneves, Charlie Kimball, and Graham Rahal.

Racing resumed on lap 41, where Rahal was able to quickly dispatch Kimball in turn seven. Up front, Pagenaud continued to lead, but Castroneves was able to stay with him much better than earlier in the race. However, due to his alternate strategy, he came into the pits again on lap 50, leaving Pagenaud ahead of Rahal. Kimball was also on an alternate pit strategy and pitted just before Castroneves.

For those on the normal strategy, the final pit stops came around lap 60. Pagenaud's final stop came on lap 61. Rahal pitted a lap later, moving Pagenaud back in front of him. Their pit stops allowed Castroneves to take the lead of the race, though Castroneves still needed one more pit stop to make it to the end of the race. The race would not automatically go to Pagenaud after Castroneves' stop, though, as Graham Rahal began to close the gap. By lap 67, the gap had shrunk to just over half a second.

On lap 69, Castroneves came in for his final stop, making the battle between Pagenaud and Rahal officially the battle for the lead. Montoya moved up to third, while the Andretti Autosport teammates of Alexander Rossi and Ryan Hunter-Reay moved into the top five as other alternate-strategy drivers ducked into the pits. At the lead of the race, Pagenaud was once again able to pull his lead out again. While Rahal would make another attempt at catching him, Pagenaud's pace combined with his saved up push-to-pass presses proved too much. Pagenaud held on to win his fifth race of the season and, more importantly, the IndyCar Series championship title. Rahal came across the line second, while Montoya rounded out the podium. Hunter-Reay snatched fourth place away from Rossi at the last moment after Rossi ran out of fuel coming out of turn 11. However, Rossi would still manage fifth, making him the highest finishing rookie in the race.

Pagenaud's dominant performance secured his first IndyCar Series title in his second year of driving for Team Penske. The finish of the race also allowed Penske a sweep of the top three positions in the championship, with Power finishing second and Castroneves finishing third. Josef Newgarden, who came across the line sixth in the race, took fourth in the championship, while Graham Rahal's second-place finish boosted him into the top five and made him the highest finishing Honda driver in the championship. In the Rookie of the Year competition, Alexander Rossi's fifth-place easily secured his spot as the 2016 Rookie of the Year. His chief rival, Conor Daly, was one of two drivers who failed to finish the races after mechanical issues struck his car.

== Results ==
Key	Meaning
R	Rookie
W	Past winner

=== Qualifying ===
Pos	No.	Name	Grp.	Round 1	Round 2	Round 3
1	22	(France) Simon Pagenaud	1	1:16.2530	1:16.2687	1:16.2565
2	3	(Brazil) Hélio Castroneves W	2	1:16.5316	1:16.5134	1:16.4134
3	2	(Colombia) Juan Pablo Montoya	1	1:16.3092	1:16.5545	1:16.5400
4	12	(Australia) Will Power W	1	1:16.8252	1:16.5472	1:16.6659
5	15	(United States) Graham Rahal	2	1:16.8088	1:16.2828	1:16.7149
6	28	(United States) Ryan Hunter-Reay	2	1:16.4993	1:16.5668	1:16.9132
7	9	(New Zealand) Scott Dixon W	2	1:16.8700	1:16.5700	
8	98	(United States) Alexander Rossi R	2	1:16.8174	1:16.5840	
9	11	(France) Sébastien Bourdais	1	1:16.6615	1:16.6115	
10	21	(United States) Josef Newgarden	1	1:16.6943	1:16.8142	
11	7	(Russia) Mikhail Aleshin	2	1:16.7036	1:16.8909	
12	83	(United States) Charlie Kimball	1	1:16.8491	1:16.9627	
13	10	(Brazil) Tony Kanaan W	1	1:16.9481		
14	27	(United States) Marco Andretti W	2	1:16.9288		
15	14	(Japan) Takuma Sato	1	1:16.9661		
16	26	(Colombia) Carlos Muñoz	2	1:17.0314		
17	41	(United Kingdom) Jack Hawksworth	1	1:17.0823		
18	8	(United Kingdom) Max Chilton R	2	1:17.1310		
19	20	(United States) Spencer Pigot R	1	1:17.3052		
20	5	(Canada) James Hinchcliffe	2	1:17.1926		
21	18	(United States) Conor Daly R	1	1:17.6771		
22	19	(United States) RC Enerson R	2	1:17.3264		
OFFICIAL BOX SCORE

Source for individual rounds:

=== Race ===
Pos	No.	Driver	Team	Engine	Laps	Time/Retired	Pit Stops	Grid	Laps Led	Pts.^{1}^{2}
1	22	(France) Simon Pagenaud	Team Penske	Chevrolet	85	2:00:12.9424	3	1	76	104
2	15	(United States) Graham Rahal	Rahal Letterman Lanigan Racing	Honda	85	+3.2523	3	5	2	81
3	2	(Colombia) Juan Pablo Montoya	Team Penske	Chevrolet	85	+18.0157	3	3		70
4	28	(United States) Ryan Hunter-Reay	Andretti Autosport	Honda	85	+29.7224	3	6		64
5	98	(United States) Alexander Rossi R	Andretti Herta Autosport	Honda	85	+30.6649	3	8		60
6	21	(United States) Josef Newgarden	Ed Carpenter Racing	Chevrolet	85	+32.2754	3	10		56
7	3	(Brazil) Hélio Castroneves W	Team Penske	Chevrolet	85	+32.8490	4	2	7	53
8	27	(United States) Marco Andretti W	Andretti Autosport	Honda	85	+34.3002	3	14		48
9	83	(United States) Charlie Kimball	Chip Ganassi Racing	Chevrolet	85	+34.9353	4	12		44
10	11	(France) Sébastien Bourdais	KVSH Racing	Chevrolet	85	+43.8965	3	9		40
11	7	(Russia) Mikhail Aleshin	Schmidt Peterson Motorsports	Honda	85	+49.3242	4	11		38
12	5	(Canada) James Hinchcliffe	Schmidt Peterson Motorsports	Honda	85	+51.1304	3	20		36
13	10	(Brazil) Tony Kanaan W	Chip Ganassi Racing	Chevrolet	85	+52.1792	4	13		34
14	14	(Japan) Takuma Sato	A. J. Foyt Enterprises	Honda	85	+52.6331	4	15		32
15	26	(Colombia) Carlos Muñoz	Andretti Autosport	Honda	85	+56.6756	4	16		30
16	8	(United Kingdom) Max Chilton R	Chip Ganassi Racing	Chevrolet	85	+1:09.2581	5	18		28
17	9	(New Zealand) Scott Dixon W	Chip Ganassi Racing	Chevrolet	85	+1:21.1112	5	7		26
18	41	(United Kingdom) Jack Hawksworth	A. J. Foyt Enterprises	Honda	84	+1 Lap	6	17		24
19	19	(United States) RC Enerson R	Dale Coyne Racing	Honda	84	+1 Lap	5	22		22
20	12	(Australia) Will Power W	Team Penske	Chevrolet	77	+8 Laps	2	4		20
21	18	(United States) Conor Daly R	Dale Coyne Racing	Honda	36	Mechanical	4	21		18
22	20	(United States) Spencer Pigot R	Ed Carpenter Racing	Chevrolet	35	Mechanical	2	19		16
OFFICIAL BOX SCORE

^{1} Points include 1 point for leading at least 1 lap during a race, an additional 2 points for leading the most race laps, and 1 point for Pole Position.

^{2} Double points awarded for season finale.

Source for time gaps:

== Championship standings after the race ==
Drivers' Championship standings

	Pos	Driver	Points
	1	(France) Simon Pagenaud	659
	2	(Australia) Will Power	532
1	3	(Brazil) Hélio Castroneves	504
1	4	(United States) Josef Newgarden	502
2	5	(United States) Graham Rahal	484

- Note: Only the top five positions are included.

Previous race: 2016 IndyCar Grand Prix at The Glen	IndyCar Series; 2016 season	Next race: None
Previous race: 2015 GoPro Grand Prix of Sonoma	GoPro Grand Prix of Sonoma	Next race: 2017 GoPro Grand Prix of Sonoma
