= Grand Prix of Boston =

The Grand Prix of Boston was a proposed IndyCar Series race scheduled to be first held on September 4, 2016. The race was to have taken place on a 2.25 mile route along the South Boston Seaport.

== Plans ==
In May 2015, IndyCar announced a new race in Boston that would be run on Labor Day weekend each year starting in 2016 until 2020. In April 2016, the city of Boston, Massachusetts Department of Transportation, Massachusetts Bay Transportation Authority, and the Massachusetts Convention Center Authority had reached an agreement with Indycar to allow the race to move forward. In November 2015, Boston Mayor Marty Walsh and IndyCar signed an agreement to host the event. The administration of Massachusetts governor Charlie Baker was also involved in the race preparation as the race circuit at the South Boston Seaport would have included parcels of land owned by the state of Massachusetts. The event would have been the first IndyCar race to take place in Boston.

The race was scheduled to take place on Labor Day weekend in September 2016. Alongside the IndyCar Series, it was also scheduled to including races by the Indy Lights, Stadium Super Trucks, and IMSA Super Trofeo series.

== Cancelation ==
The event faced local opposition, including from residents of nearby neighborhoods who expressed concerns over impacts such as noise and additional traffic.

In May 2016 Indycar abruptly cancelled the event, It was first decided that IndyCar would not use the South Boston Seaport (with consideration initially given to moving the event to another Boston-area location), before plans for the race were cancelled altogether. John Casey (the president of the Grand Prix of Boston's corporate board) blamed the cancellation on demands made by Walsh's mayoral administration, which he characterized as unreasonable. Both Walsh and the spokesperson for IndyCar later expressed an openness to hosting a race in Boston sometime in the future.

The event was replaced on the 2016 IndyCar Series schedule by a race at Watkins Glen.

After the cancellation, the CEO of the Boston Grand Prix, Casey appeared in U.S. Bankruptcy Court to account for the project's funds. In 2021, Casey, who had also served as chief financial officer of the Boston Grand Prix, pleaded guilty to multiple counts of wire fraud, aggravated identity theft, money laundering, and filing false tax returns.
