= 2018 Firestone Grand Prix of St. Petersburg =

IndyCar Series race

(United States) 2018 St. Petersburg
Race details
1st round of the 2018 IndyCar Series season
Next race →
- Date: March 11, 2018
- Official name: Firestone Grand Prix of St. Petersburg
- Location: Streets of St. Petersburg
- Course: Temporary street circuit 1.800 mi / 2.897 km
- Distance: 110 laps 198.000 mi / 318.670 km

Pole position
- Driver: (Canada) Robert Wickens (Schmidt Peterson Motorsports)
- Time: 1:01.6664

Fastest lap
- Driver: (United States) Alexander Rossi (Andretti Autosport)
- Time: 1:01.7244 (on lap 87 of 110)

Podium
- First: (France) Sebastien Bourdais (Dale Coyne Racing with Vasser-Sullivan)
- Second: (United States) Graham Rahal (Rahal Letterman Lanigan Racing)
- Third: (United States) Alexander Rossi (Andretti Autosport)

Chronology
Previous	Next
2017	2019

The 2018 Firestone Grand Prix of St. Petersburg was the first round of the 2018 IndyCar Series. The race was held on March 11, 2018, in St. Petersburg, Florida, on the city's temporary street circuit.

== Background ==
The race was the debut of the new standard aero kits.

== Report ==
=== Qualifying ===
Rookie Robert Wickens took the pole in his first ever IndyCar Series start, while newcomers Matheus Leist and Jordan King also made the Firestone Fast Six, qualifying third and fourth, respectively.

=== Race ===
The race featured a record number of cautions (8), on-track passes (366) and lead changes (11).

Robert Wickens lead most of the race, until the last restart, when the 2nd place car of Alexander Rossi attempted a pass down the inside of turn 1. It seemed as though Rossi had completed the move, until he slid up the track, taking Wickens out, and leaving himself to limp home to 3rd in a damaged car.

== Results ==
Icon	Meaning
R	Rookie
W	Past winner

=== Qualifying ===
Pos	No.	Name	Grp.	Round 1	Round 2	Firestone Fast 6
1	6	(Canada) Robert Wickens R	1	1:00.0999	1:00.5428	1:01.6643
2	12	(Australia) Will Power W	2	1:00.5969	1:00.5911	1:01.7346
3	4	(Brazil) Matheus Leist R	2	1:00.6331	1:00.7679	1:01.7631
4	20	(United Kingdom) Jordan King R	1	1:00.0476	1:00.7305	1:01.7633
5	30	(Japan) Takuma Sato	2	1:00.9580	1:00.8470	1:01.8821
6	28	(United States) Ryan Hunter-Reay	1	1:00.4087	1:00.9243	1:02.0385
7	5	(Canada) James Hinchcliffe W	2	1:00.8441	1:00.9986	
8	88	(Colombia) Gabby Chaves	2	1:00.8507	1:01.1191	
9	9	(New Zealand) Scott Dixon	2	1:00.8435	1:01.6527	
10	14	(Brazil) Tony Kanaan	1	1:00.2828	1:01.7213	
11	22	(France) Simon Pagenaud	1	1:00.3242	1:04.6739	
12	27	(United States) Alexander Rossi	1	1:00.0936	1:07.0377	
13	1	(United States) Josef Newgarden	1	1:00.4320		
14	18	(France) Sébastien Bourdais W	2	1:00.9587		
15	26	(United States) Zach Veach R	1	1:00.4585		
16	21	(United States) Spencer Pigot	2	1:00.9668		
17	10	(United Arab Emirates) Ed Jones	1	1:00.5009		
18	98	(United States) Marco Andretti	2	1:01.3013		
19	60	(United Kingdom) Jack Harvey R	1	1:01.0270		
20	59	(United Kingdom) Max Chilton	2	1:01.3360		
21	23	(United States) Charlie Kimball	1	1:01.1868		
22	19	(Canada) Zachary Claman DeMelo R	2	1:01.8567		
23	32	(Austria) René Binder R	1	1:01.7003		
24	15	(United States) Graham Rahal W	2	1:04.0990		
OFFICIAL BOX SCORE

Source for individual rounds:

=== Race ===
Pos	No.	Driver	Team	Engine	Laps	Time/Retired	Pit Stops	Grid	Laps Led	Pts.^{1}
1	18	(France) Sébastien Bourdais W	Dale Coyne Racing with Vasser-Sullivan	Honda	110	2:17:48.4954	4	14	30	51
2	15	(United States) Graham Rahal W	Rahal Letterman Lanigan Racing	Honda	110	+0.1269	3	24		40
3	27	(United States) Alexander Rossi	Andretti Autosport	Honda	110	+0.7109	3	12	5	36
4	5	(Canada) James Hinchcliffe W	Schmidt Peterson Motorsports	Honda	110	+1.5175	3	7		32
5	28	(United States) Ryan Hunter-Reay	Andretti Autosport	Honda	110	+1.9907	4	6	1	31
6	9	(New Zealand) Scott Dixon	Chip Ganassi Racing	Honda	110	+2.2716	6	9		28
7	1	(United States) Josef Newgarden	Team Penske	Chevrolet	110	+3.3842	4	13		26
8	10	(United Arab Emirates) Ed Jones	Chip Ganassi Racing	Honda	110	+4.2992	3	17		24
9	98	(United States) Marco Andretti	Andretti Herta Autosport with Curb-Agajanian	Honda	110	+4.8363	3	18		22
10	12	(Australia) Will Power W	Team Penske	Chevrolet	110	+6.1272	4	2		20
11	14	(Brazil) Tony Kanaan	A. J. Foyt Enterprises	Chevrolet	110	+6.5176	3	10		19
12	30	(Japan) Takuma Sato	Rahal Letterman Lanigan Racing	Honda	110	+7.4005	5	5		18
13	22	(France) Simon Pagenaud	Team Penske	Chevrolet	110	+7.9903	4	11		17
14	88	(Colombia) Gabby Chaves	Harding Racing	Chevrolet	110	+9.2272	4	8		16
15	21	(United States) Spencer Pigot	Ed Carpenter Racing	Chevrolet	109	+1 Lap	6	16		15
16	26	(United States) Zach Veach R	Andretti Autosport	Honda	109	+1 Lap	5	15		14
17	19	(Canada) Zachary Claman DeMelo R	Dale Coyne Racing	Honda	109	+1 Lap	5	22		13
18	6	(Canada) Robert Wickens R	Schmidt Peterson Motorsports	Honda	108	Contact	3	1	69	16
19	59	(United Kingdom) Max Chilton	Carlin	Chevrolet	108	+2 Laps	5	20		11
20	23	(United States) Charlie Kimball	Carlin	Chevrolet	107	+3 Laps	6	21		10
21	20	(United Kingdom) Jordan King R	Ed Carpenter Racing	Chevrolet	107	+3 Laps	5	4	5	10
22	32	(Austria) René Binder R	Juncos Racing	Chevrolet	100	Contact	5	23		8
23	60	(United Kingdom) Jack Harvey R	Michael Shank Racing with Schmidt Peterson	Honda	38	Off Course	1	19		7
24	4	(Brazil) Matheus Leist R	A. J. Foyt Enterprises	Chevrolet	16	Contact	2	3		6
OFFICIAL BOX SCORE

Notes: ^{1} Points include 1 point for leading at least 1 lap during a race, an additional 2 points for leading the most race laps, and 1 point for Pole Position.

== Championship standings after the race ==
Drivers' Championship standings

Pos	Driver	Points
1	(France) Sebastien Bourdais	51
2	(United States) Graham Rahal	40
3	(United States) Alexander Rossi	36
4	(Canada) James Hinchcliffe	32
5	(United States) Ryan Hunter-Reay	31

Manufacturer standings

Pos	Manufacturer	Points
1	(Japan) Honda	96
2	(United States) Chevrolet	46

- Note: Only the top five positions are included.

Previous race: None	IndyCar Series; 2018 season	Next race: 2018 Desert Diamond West Valley Phoenix Grand Prix
Previous race: 2017 Firestone Grand Prix of St. Petersburg	Firestone Grand Prix of St. Petersburg	Next race: 2019 Firestone Grand Prix of St. Petersburg
