= 2016 Desert Diamond West Valley Phoenix Grand Prix =

Car race

(United States) 2016 Phoenix
Race details
2nd round of the 2016 IndyCar Series season
| ← Previous race | Next race → |
- Phoenix International Raceway (2011-2018)
- Date: April 2, 2016
- Official name: Desert Diamond West Valley Phoenix Grand Prix
- Location: Phoenix International Raceway
- Course: Permanent racing facility 1.022 mi / 1.645 km
- Distance: 250 laps 255.5 mi / 411.25 km

Pole position
- Driver: (Brazil) Hélio Castroneves (Team Penske)
- Time: 38.2604

Fastest lap
- Driver: (Brazil) Tony Kanaan (Chip Ganassi Racing)
- Time: 19.7379 (on lap 215 of 250)

Podium
- First: (New Zealand) Scott Dixon (Chip Ganassi Racing)
- Second: (France) Simon Pagenaud (Team Penske)
- Third: (Australia) Will Power (Team Penske)

The 2016 Desert Diamond West Valley Phoenix Grand Prix was the second round of the 2016 IndyCar Series season and the first oval race of the season. It took place on April 2, 2016, at Phoenix International Raceway in Avondale, Arizona. The race marked the return of open wheel racing to the course, as IndyCar had not visited Phoenix since 2005. Team Penske driver Hélio Castroneves grabbed pole position for the race with a two lap time of 38.2604 seconds. In the process, he set a new single lap track record with a time of 19.0997 seconds. One incident occurred in qualifying when Carlos Muñoz spun and crashed in turn one during his attempt. Two other drivers, James Hinchcliffe and Takuma Sato, made no qualifying attempts due to damage sustained in practice incidents.

Hélio Castroneves led the opening 39 laps of the race before a right-front tire puncture ruined his race. Juan Pablo Montoya inherited the lead and led to lap 95 before suffering the same fate as his teammate Castroneves. From there, Scott Dixon inherited the lead and led the remaining 155 laps, giving Dixon his 39th win and tying Al Unser for 4th in most career IndyCar victories. Simon Pagenaud finished second, moving him into the lead of the championship standings. Graham Rahal would prove the biggest mover in the race, charging up from a lowly 19th place start to finish in fifth place. Rahal was also the highest placed Honda in the race. Despite having little oval experience, Max Chilton surprised as the highest finishing rookie, coming across the line in 7th.

A total of six caution flags flew during the race, all due to spins or contact. The first came on lap 50 when Luca Filippi spun coming off of the first turn. He did not make contact with the barriers. The second came on lap 120, when Carlos Muñoz hit the wall at the exit of turn four. Muñoz would retire from the race due to the damage to his car. Shortly after the restart from the second yellow, the third caution came on lap 134 when Josef Newgarden and Charlie Kimball made contact in the first turn, sending Kimball into a spin. Kimball was given a drive through penalty for avoidable contact for the incident. Lap 146 saw the next caution when Sébastien Bourdais went wide in turn three and brushed the outside wall in turn four. After finally having another significant green flag period, caution waved again for the fifth time of the race on lap 198, when Ed Carpenter drifted wide and slapped the outside wall in turn four, making him the second retirement of the race. The final yellow would come out on lap 248 and force the race to finish under yellow flag conditions after Alexander Rossi brushed the wall in turn four.

== Report ==
| Key | Meaning |
|---|---|
| R | Rookie |
| W | Past winner |

=== Qualifying ===
| Pos | No. | Name | Lap 1 Time | Lap 2 Time | Total Time | Avg. Speed (mph) |
|---|---|---|---|---|---|---|
| 1 | 3 | (Brazil) Hélio Castroneves W | 19.0997 | 19.1607 | 38.2604 | 192.324 |
| 2 | 10 | (Brazil) Tony Kanaan W | 19.2046 | 19.2182 | 38.4228 | 191.511 |
| 3 | 2 | (Colombia) Juan Pablo Montoya | 19.2375 | 19.2145 | 38.4520 | 191.366 |
| 4 | 83 | (United States) Charlie Kimball | 19.2278 | 19.2535 | 38.4813 | 191.220 |
| 5 | 20 | (United States) Ed Carpenter | 19.2647 | 19.3053 | 38.5700 | 190.780 |
| 6 | 9 | (New Zealand) Scott Dixon | 19.3563 | 19.2956 | 38.6519 | 190.376 |
| 7 | 21 | (United States) Josef Newgarden | 19.3675 | 19.3418 | 38.7093 | 190.094 |
| 8 | 8 | (United Kingdom) Max Chilton R | 19.3636 | 19.3705 | 38.7341 | 189.972 |
| 9 | 12 | (Australia) Will Power | 19.4637 | 19.3160 | 38.7797 | 189.749 |
| 10 | 22 | (France) Simon Pagenaud | 19.4464 | 19.3526 | 38.7990 | 189.654 |
| 11 | 27 | (United States) Marco Andretti | 19.4680 | 19.4508 | 38.9188 | 189.071 |
| 12 | 28 | (United States) Ryan Hunter-Reay | 19.4653 | 19.4750 | 38.9403 | 188.966 |
| 13 | 7 | (Russia) Mikhail Aleshin | 19.6250 | 19.5159 | 39.1409 | 187.998 |
| 14 | 98 | (United States) Alexander Rossi R | 19.6821 | 19.6804 | 39.3625 | 186.939 |
| 15 | 11 | (France) Sébastien Bourdais | 19.8148 | 19.6312 | 39.4460 | 186.544 |
| 16 | 19 | (Italy) Luca Filippi | 19.8442 | 19.7562 | 39.6009 | 185.814 |
| 17 | 41 | (United Kingdom) Jack Hawksworth | 19.8224 | 19.9429 | 39.7653 | 185.046 |
| 18 | 18 | (United States) Conor Daly R | 20.0226 | 19.9121 | 39.9347 | 184.261 |
| 19 | 15 | (United States) Graham Rahal | 20.3621 | 20.5702 | 40.9323 | 179.770 |
| 20 | 14 | (Japan) Takuma Sato | | | No Time | No Speed |
| 21 | 26 | (Colombia) Carlos Muñoz | | | No Time | No Speed |
| 22 | 5 | (Canada) James Hinchcliffe | | | No Time | No Speed |
OFFICIAL BOX SCORE

=== Race results ===
| Pos | No. | Driver | Team | Engine | Laps | Time/Retired^{2} | Pit Stops | Grid | Laps Led | Pts.^{1} |
|---|---|---|---|---|---|---|---|---|---|---|
| 1 | 9 | (New Zealand) Scott Dixon | Chip Ganassi Racing | Chevrolet | 250 | 1:49:38.3855 | 3 | 6 | 155 | 53 |
| 2 | 22 | (France) Simon Pagenaud | Team Penske | Chevrolet | 250 | +0.6825 | 3 | 10 | | 40 |
| 3 | 12 | (Australia) Will Power | Team Penske | Chevrolet | 250 | +1.7264 | 3 | 9 | | 35 |
| 4 | 10 | (Brazil) Tony Kanaan W | Chip Ganassi Racing | Chevrolet | 250 | +1.9589 | 3 | 2 | | 32 |
| 5 | 15 | (United States) Graham Rahal | Rahal Letterman Lanigan Racing | Honda | 250 | +2.5272 | 3 | 19 | | 30 |
| 6 | 21 | (United States) Josef Newgarden | Ed Carpenter Racing | Chevrolet | 250 | +2.7457 | 5 | 7 | | 28 |
| 7 | 8 | (United Kingdom) Max Chilton R | Chip Ganassi Racing | Chevrolet | 250 | +2.9914 | 3 | 8 | | 26 |
| 8 | 11 | (France) Sébastien Bourdais | KVSH Racing | Chevrolet | 250 | +3.9491 | 5 | 15 | | 24 |
| 9 | 2 | (Colombia) Juan Pablo Montoya | Team Penske | Chevrolet | 250 | +4.4548 | 4 | 3 | 56 | 23 |
| 10 | 28 | (United States) Ryan Hunter-Reay | Andretti Autosport | Honda | 250 | +5.2143 | 3 | 12 | | 20 |
| 11 | 3 | (Brazil) Hélio Castroneves W | Team Penske | Chevrolet | 250 | +8.0324 | 4 | 1 | 39 | 21 |
| 12 | 83 | (United States) Charlie Kimball | Chip Ganassi Racing | Chevrolet | 250 | +9.3366 | 5 | 4 | | 18 |
| 13 | 27 | (United States) Marco Andretti | Andretti Autosport | Honda | 250 | +10.0918 | 4 | 11 | | 17 |
| 14 | 98 | (United States) Alexander Rossi R | Andretti Herta Autosport | Honda | 250 | +13.0555 | 4 | 14 | | 16 |
| 15 | 14 | (Japan) Takuma Sato | A. J. Foyt Enterprises | Honda | 249 | +1 Lap | 5 | 20 | | 15 |
| 16 | 18 | (United States) Conor Daly R | Dale Coyne Racing | Honda | 249 | +1 Lap | 5 | 18 | | 14 |
| 17 | 7 | (Russia) Mikhail Aleshin | Schmidt Peterson Motorsports | Honda | 248 | +2 Laps | 4 | 13 | | 13 |
| 18 | 5 | (Canada) James Hinchcliffe | Schmidt Peterson Motorsports | Honda | 248 | +2 Laps | 6 | 22 | | 12 |
| 19 | 41 | (United Kingdom) Jack Hawksworth | A. J. Foyt Enterprises | Honda | 246 | +4 Laps | 6 | 17 | | 11 |
| 20 | 19 | (Italy) Luca Filippi | Dale Coyne Racing | Honda | 243 | +7 Laps | 4 | 16 | | 10 |
| 21 | 20 | (United States) Ed Carpenter | Ed Carpenter Racing | Chevrolet | 195 | Contact | 2 | 5 | | 9 |
| 22 | 26 | (Colombia) Carlos Muñoz | Andretti Autosport | Honda | 116 | Contact | 2 | 21 | | 8 |
OFFICIAL BOX SCORE

Notes

^{1} Points include 1 point for leading at least 1 lap during a race, an additional 2 points for leading the most race laps, and 1 point for Pole Position.

^{2} Race finished under caution

Source for time gaps:

== Championship standings after the race ==
Drivers' Championship standings

| | Pos | Driver | Points |
| 1 | 1 | (France) Simon Pagenaud | 83 |
| 5 | 2 | (New Zealand) Scott Dixon | 79 |
| 2 | 3 | (Colombia) Juan Pablo Montoya | 74 |
| 1 | 4 | (United States) Ryan Hunter-Reay | 56 |
| 4 | 5 | (Brazil) Tony Kanaan | 54 |

- Note: Only the top five positions are included.

| Previous race: 2016 Firestone Grand Prix of St. Petersburg | IndyCar Series; 2016 season | Next race: 2016 Toyota Grand Prix of Long Beach |
| Previous race: 2005 XM Satellite Radio Indy 200 | Desert Diamond West Valley Phoenix Grand Prix | Next race: 2017 Desert Diamond West Valley Phoenix Grand Prix |
