= 2016 Firestone Grand Prix of St. Petersburg =

(United States) 2016 St. Petersburg
Race details
1st round of the 2016 IndyCar Series season
Next race →
- Date: March 13, 2016
- Official name: Firestone Grand Prix of St. Petersburg
- Location: Streets of St. Petersburg
- Course: Temporary street circuit 1.800 mi / 2.897 km
- Distance: 110 laps 198.000 mi / 318.670 km

Pole position
- Driver: (Australia) Will Power (Team Penske)
- Time: 1:00.2450

Fastest lap
- Driver: (United States) Josef Newgarden (Ed Carpenter Racing)
- Time: 1:02.2307 (on lap 42 of 110)

Podium
- First: (Colombia) Juan Pablo Montoya (Team Penske)
- Second: (France) Simon Pagenaud (Team Penske)
- Third: (United States) Ryan Hunter-Reay (Andretti Autosport)

Chronology
Previous	Next
2015	2017

The 2016 Firestone Grand Prix of St. Petersburg was the first round of the 2016 IndyCar Series. The race was held on March 13, 2016 in St. Petersburg, Florida on the city's temporary street circuit. Team Penske driver Will Power qualified on pole for the race, but was diagnosed with a concussion shortly after the conclusion of the session and was forced to miss the race. Oriol Servià filled in place of Power. Second place qualifier Simon Pagenaud inherited the pole position.

Simon Pagenaud led the opening 48 laps of the race before being passed by his teammate Juan Pablo Montoya. Montoya would lead 44 laps en route to his second win in a row at St. Petersburg and most recent IndyCar victory to date. Rookie driver Conor Daly also led 15 laps during the race due to pit strategy, but was shuffled outside the top 10 by the end of the race. Alexander Rossi was the highest finishing rookie in the race, coming across the line in 12th position. The race tied the record for fewest caution flags in a race at St. Petersburg with only two coming out over the whole of the race. The first came on lap 46 when Luca Filippi and Marco Andretti made contact in the first turn. The second came on the restart from the prior caution when Carlos Muñoz made contact with Graham Rahal in turn four, creating a logjam that completely blocked the race course.

After the race, Will Power was reevaluated and deemed not to have a concussion, but instead to be suffering from a lingering ear infection. Power would be cleared to race for the following round at Phoenix International Raceway.

== Report ==
Key	Meaning
R	Rookie
W	Past winner

=== Qualifying ===
Pos	No.	Name	Grp.	Round 1	Round 2	Round 3
1	12	(Australia) Will Power W	2	1:00.5678	1:00.0658	1:00.2450
2	22	(France) Simon Pagenaud	2	1:00.6503	1:00.3805	1:00.4421
3	3	(Brazil) Hélio Castroneves W	2	1:00.7320	1:00.5168	1:00.4995
4	2	(Colombia) Juan Pablo Montoya W	2	1:00.7060	1:00.4431	1:00.5312
5	9	(New Zealand) Scott Dixon	1	1:00.8921	1:00.2318	1:00.5395
6	28	(United States) Ryan Hunter-Reay	2	1:00.9830	1:00.5530	1:00.8803
7	15	(United States) Graham Rahal W	1	1:00.9578	1:00.5893	
8	11	(France) Sébastien Bourdais	1	1:01.1450	1:00.6711	
9	5	(Canada) James Hinchcliffe W	1	1:00.9973	1:00.6724	
10	41	(United Kingdom) Jack Hawksworth	1	1:01.1322	1:00.7188	
11	14	(Japan) Takuma Sato	2	1:00.7920	1:00.9745	
12	21	(United States) Josef Newgarden	1	1:01.0836	1:01.0571	
13	26	(Colombia) Carlos Muñoz	1	1:01.1856		
14	83	(United States) Charlie Kimball	2	1:01.0433		
15	27	(United States) Marco Andretti	1	1:01.2417		
16	19	(Italy) Luca Filippi	2	1:01.1699		
17	8	(United Kingdom) Max Chilton R	1	1:01.5372		
18	7	(Russia) Mikhail Aleshin	2	1:01.2934		
19	98	(United States) Alexander Rossi R	1	1:01.5794		
20	10	(Brazil) Tony Kanaan	2	1:01.3414		
21	18	(United States) Conor Daly R	1	1:01.9385		
22	16	(United States) Spencer Pigot R	2	1:01.3881		
OFFICIAL BOX SCORE

Source for Individual Rounds:

=== Race results ===
Pos	No.	Driver	Team	Engine	Laps	Time/Retired	Pit Stops	Grid	Laps Led	Pts.^{1}
1	2	(Colombia) Juan Pablo Montoya W	Team Penske	Chevrolet	110	2:13:28.4650	3	3	44	51
2	22	(France) Simon Pagenaud	Team Penske	Chevrolet	110	+2.3306	3	1	48	43
3	28	(United States) Ryan Hunter-Reay	Andretti Autosport	Honda	110	+8.8764	3	5	3	36
4	3	(Brazil) Hélio Castroneves W	Team Penske	Chevrolet	110	+9.3237	3	2		32
5	7	(Russia) Mikhail Aleshin	Schmidt Peterson Motorsports	Honda	110	+9.7167	5	17		30
6	14	(Japan) Takuma Sato	A. J. Foyt Enterprises	Honda	110	+26.0373	5	10		28
7	9	(New Zealand) Scott Dixon	Chip Ganassi Racing	Chevrolet	110	+40.7056	4	4		26
8	26	(Colombia) Carlos Muñoz	Andretti Autosport	Honda	110	+55.9459	5	12		24
9	10	(Brazil) Tony Kanaan	Chip Ganassi Racing	Chevrolet	110	+59.1204	4	19		22
10	83	(United States) Charlie Kimball	Chip Ganassi Racing	Chevrolet	109	Contact	4	13		20
11	41	(United Kingdom) Jack Hawksworth	A. J. Foyt Enterprises	Honda	109	+1 Lap	7	9		19
12	98	(United States) Alexander Rossi R	Andretti Herta Autosport	Honda	109	+1 Lap	4	18		18
13	18	(United States) Conor Daly R	Dale Coyne Racing	Honda	109	+1 Lap	4	20	15	18
14	16	(United States) Spencer Pigot R	Rahal Letterman Lanigan Racing	Honda	109	+1 Lap	5	21		16
15	27	(United States) Marco Andretti	Andretti Autosport	Honda	109	+1 Lap	5	14		15
16	15	(United States) Graham Rahal W	Rahal Letterman Lanigan Racing	Honda	109	+1 Lap	5	6		14
17	8	(United Kingdom) Max Chilton R	Chip Ganassi Racing	Chevrolet	109	+1 Lap	4	16		13
18	12	(Spain) Oriol Servià	Team Penske	Chevrolet	109	+1 Lap	4	22		12
19	5	(Canada) James Hinchcliffe W	Schmidt Peterson Motorsports	Honda	109	+1 Lap	7	8		11
20	19	(Italy) Luca Filippi	Dale Coyne Racing	Honda	108	+2 Laps	6	15		10
21	11	(France) Sébastien Bourdais	KVSH Racing	Chevrolet	87	Contact	4	7		9
22	21	(United States) Josef Newgarden	Ed Carpenter Racing	Chevrolet	47	Electrical	8	11		8
OFFICIAL BOX SCORE

Notes

^{1} Points include 1 point for leading at least 1 lap during a race, an additional 2 points for leading the most race laps, and 1 point for Pole Position.

Source for time gaps:

== Championship standings after the race ==
Drivers' Championship standings

Pos	Driver	Points
1	(Colombia) Juan Pablo Montoya	51
2	(France) Simon Pagenaud	43
3	(United States) Ryan Hunter-Reay	36
4	(Brazil) Hélio Castroneves	32
5	(Russia) Mikhail Aleshin	30

- Note: Only the top five positions are included.

Previous race: None	IndyCar Series; 2016 season	Next race: 2016 Desert Diamond West Valley Phoenix Grand Prix
Previous race: 2015 Firestone Grand Prix of St. Petersburg	Honda Grand Prix of St. Petersburg	Next race: 2017 Firestone Grand Prix of St. Petersburg
