= Alexander Rossi =

American racing driver (born 1991)

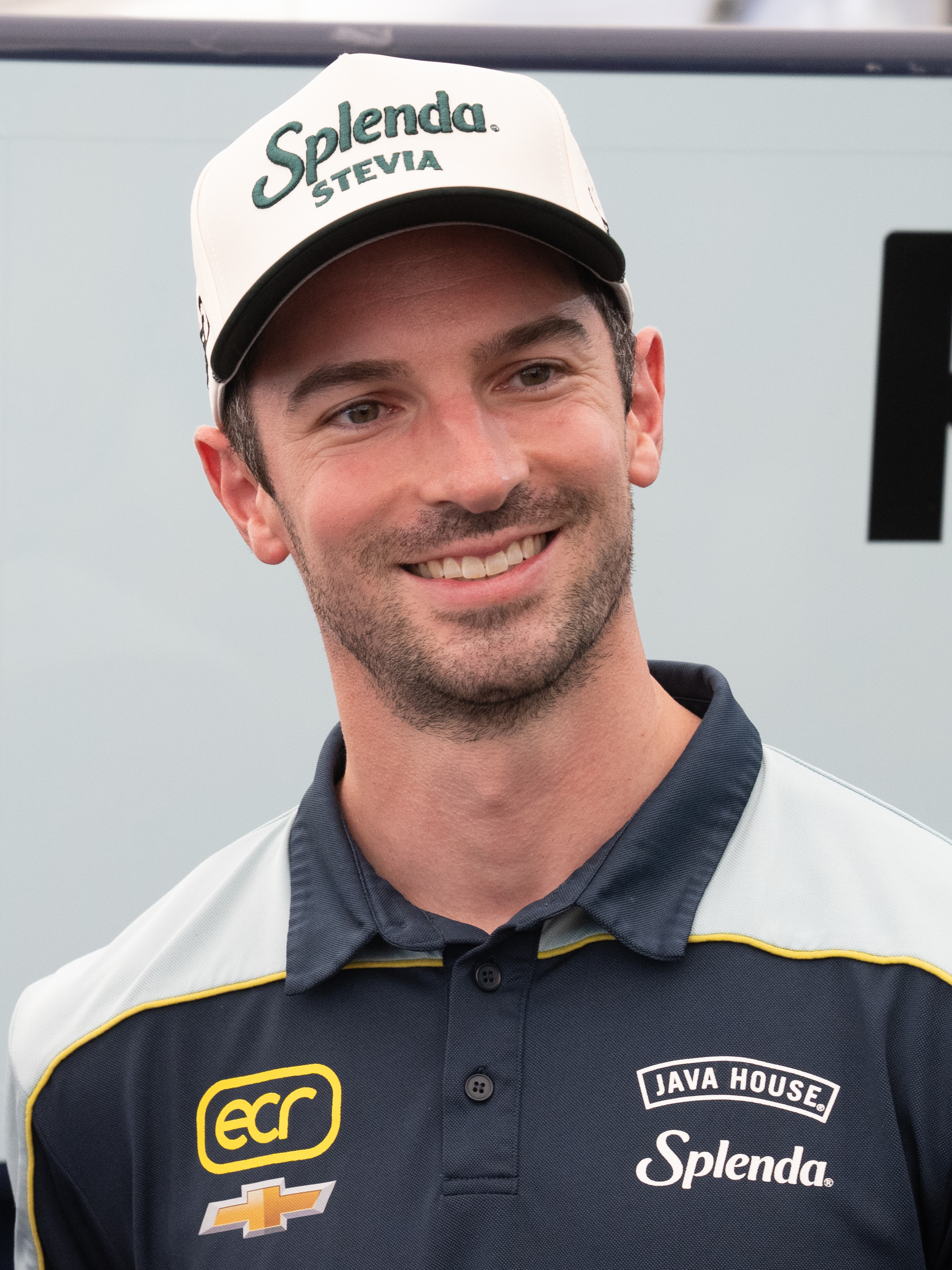
- Rossi in 2026
- Born: Alexander Michael Rossi; September 25, 1991 (age 35); Nevada City, California, U.S.

IndyCar Series career
- 182 races run over 11 years
- Team: No. 20 (Ed Carpenter Racing)
- Best finish: 2nd (2018)
- First race: 2016 Firestone Grand Prix of St. Petersburg (St. Petersburg)
- Last race: 2026 Mission Grand Prix of Monterey (Laguna Seca)
- First win: 2016 Indianapolis 500 (Indianapolis)
- Last win: 2022 Gallagher Grand Prix (IMS Road Course)
Wins	Podiums	Poles
8	31	7

Formula One World Championship career
- Nationality: (United States) American
- Active years: 2014–2015
- Team: Marussia
- Car number: 53 (Note: Rossi selected the number 53 as his personal driver number, per FIA regulations; in 2014, he was entered using the standard reserve number 42 for Marussia, but did not complete a competitive session.)
- Entries: 7 (5 starts)
- Championships: 0
- Wins: 0
- Podiums: 0
- Career points: 0
- Pole positions: 0
- Fastest laps: 0
- First entry: 2014 Belgian Grand Prix
- Last entry: 2015 Brazilian Grand Prix

24 Hours of Le Mans career
- Years: 2013
- Teams: Greaves
- Best finish: 23rd (2013)
- Class wins: 0
- Categorisation: FIA Platinum

Previous series
- 2013–2015; 2010–2012; 2010; 2009–2010; 2009; 2008; 2007–2008; 2006; 2005–2006: GP2 Series; Formula Renault 3.5; GP3 Series; GP2 Asia Series; International Formula Master; Formula BMW Europe; Formula BMW Americas; Formula TR 2000; Skip Barber

Championship titles
- 2008; 2008; 2006: Formula BMW World Final; Formula BMW Americas; Skip Barber Western

Awards
- 2016; 2016; 2020: Indy 500 Rookie of the Year; IndyCar Rookie of the Year; Indycar Series Most Popular Driver

Alexander Michael "Alex" Rossi (born September 25, 1991) is an American racing driver, who competes in the IndyCar Series for Ed Carpenter Racing. Rossi competed in Formula One at five Grands Prix in 2015. (Note: Rossi was also entered into two Grands Prix during the 2014 season with Marussia, but did not complete a competitive session in either.) In American open-wheel racing, Rossi won the Indianapolis 500 as a rookie in 2016 with Andretti Autosport; in endurance racing, he won the 24 Hours of Daytona in 2021 with WTR.

Born and raised in Nevada City, California, Rossi began his career in the United States before moving to Europe as a teenager to pursue a career in Formula One. He won four races in the developmental GP2 Series, one for EQ8 Caterham Racing in 2013, and three more for Racing Engineering in 2015.

After serving as a test and development driver for Caterham F1 and Marussia F1, Rossi made his Formula One debut in 2015 for the renamed Manor Marussia F1 Team, driving in five Grands Prix, including his home Grand Prix in the United States, where he finished a season-best 12th.

After failing to secure a full-time drive in Formula One for the 2016 season, Rossi returned to the U.S. to compete in the IndyCar Series for a team with combined resources from Andretti Autosport and Bryan Herta Autosport.

Rossi won the 2016 Indianapolis 500 and finished 11th in series points. He returned to Andretti in 2017 and added a second career win at Watkins Glen International for his first road course win in IndyCar. Rossi's 2018 and 2019 seasons were his most successful to date, finishing second and third in the Drivers' Championship point standings those years respectively.

== Career ==
=== Skip Barber ===
In 2005, after becoming IKF Grand National Champion in the 100cc Yamaha class, Rossi was semi-finalist in the Red Bull Formula One American Drivers search with a top-five finish overall out of over 2,000 nationwide candidates.

In 2006, Rossi was awarded the Skip Barber National Scholarship from Skip Barber Racing School to compete in the 2006 Skip Barber National Championship, where he finished third overall, becoming the youngest winner in Skip Barber National Championship history, at the age of fourteen.

=== Formula BMW ===
Rossi competed in the Formula BMW USA series in 2007, finishing third overall in the championship, with three wins and five podiums while driving for Team Apex Racing, USA.

For 2008, Rossi returned for his second year with the two-time Formula BMW championship-winning team EuroInternational. He won the overall championship, becoming the first American Formula BMW Champion in the Americas Championship, with ten wins from the fifteen races run.

Rossi completed the season as World Champion, winning the 2008 Formula BMW World Final at the Autódromo Hermanos Rodríguez circuit in Mexico City, beating the rookie Michael Christensen. Rossi was awarded a Formula One test with BMW Sauber F1 Team, along with European champion Esteban Gutiérrez.

=== International Formula Master ===
Rossi decided to move to compete in Europe in 2009. He chose to compete in the International Formula Master with Hitech Racing. After two rounds, Rossi moved over to ISR Racing for the remainder of the season. He won three races throughout the season, all coming during reverse-grid races.

The wins at Brno, Spa and Imola gave Rossi the second-highest tally of victories during the 2009 season, with Fabio Leimer (seven) winning more. Coupled with Pål Varhaug's sixth place in the final race at Imola, Rossi moved up to fourth overall in the championship, and the highest-placed rookie driver.

=== GP3 Series ===
In 2010, Rossi made the move to the new GP3 Series, competing for multiple-championship-winning team ART Grand Prix. He joined Pedro Nunes and Esteban Gutiérrez on the team, winning twice and finishing fourth in the series.

=== World Series by Renault ===
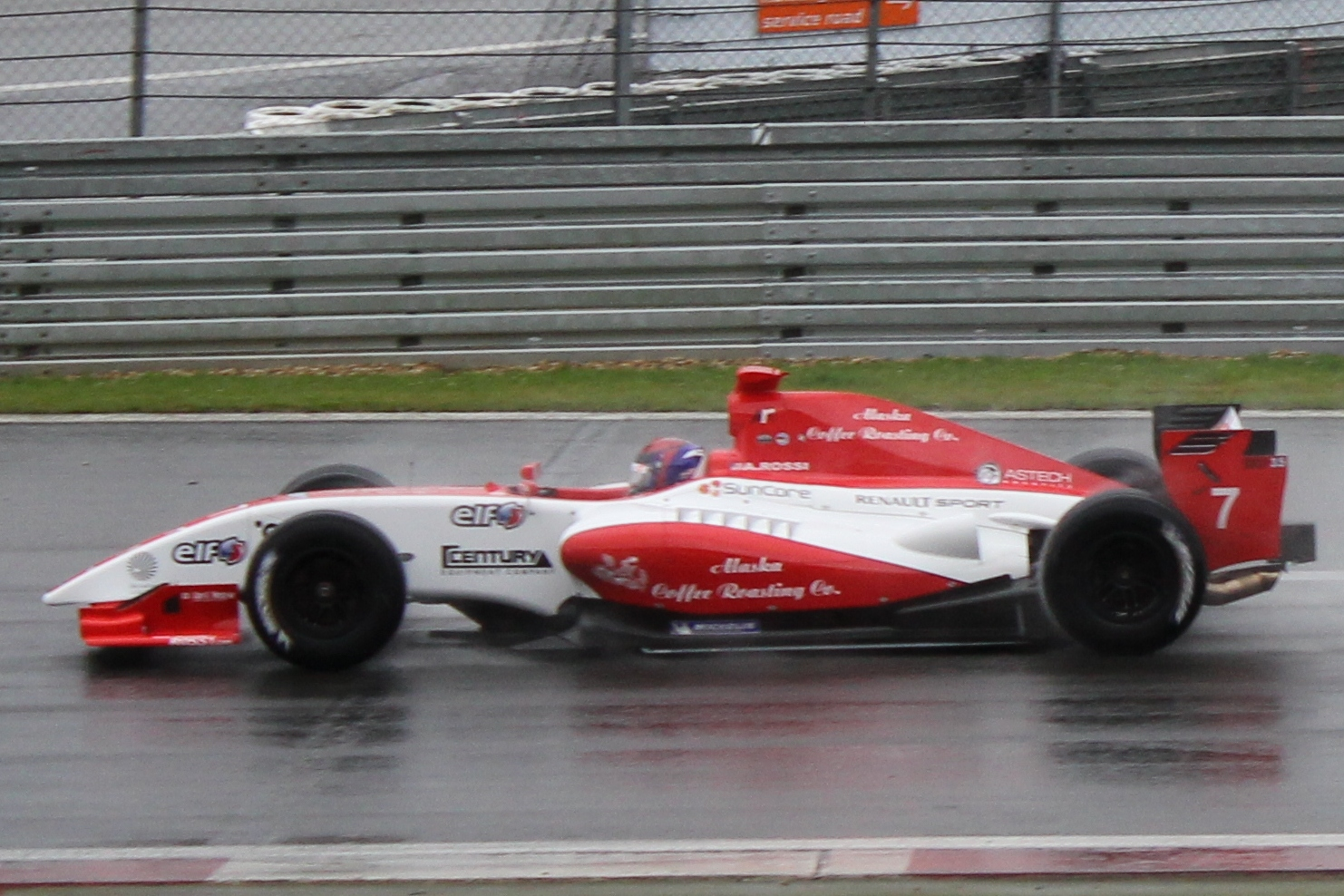
Rossi at the 2011 Nürburgring World series by Renault round

After a season in GP3, Rossi moved on to compete in the Formula Renault 3.5 Series with Fortec Motorsport. He was joined on the team by Brazilian driver and Italian Formula Three Champion César Ramos. Rossi won the opening race of the season in Aragón and the second race at Le Castellet, and eventually placed third in the championship and top rookie driver, finishing behind Carlin drivers Robert Wickens and Jean-Éric Vergne.

Rossi stayed in the series for the 2012 season, but switched to newcomers Arden Caterham Motorsport, partnering Red Bull-backed driver Lewis Williamson.

=== GP2 Series ===
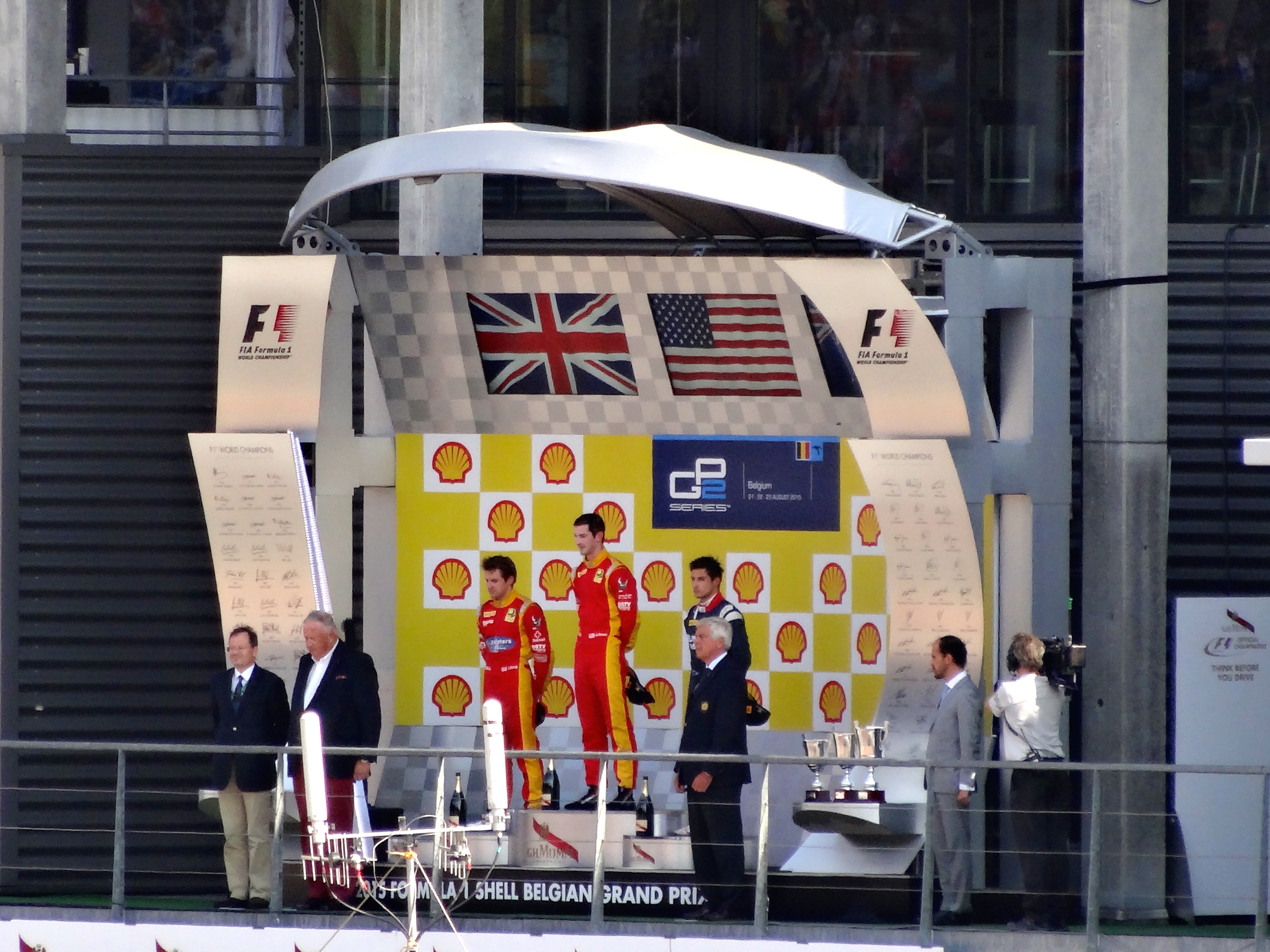
Rossi on the podium after winning a GP2 series race at Spa-Francorchamps in 2015

Rossi competed in the 2009–10 GP2 Asia Series. Having competed for Ocean Racing Technology at the first Abu Dhabi round, he moved to Team Meritus for the remaining rounds. Rossi made immediately a strong impression, finishing fourth in his debut race from 13th on the grid. Rossi was only the second American to compete at GP2 level, preceded by Scott Speed who raced in Formula One with Scuderia Toro Rosso in 2006 and 2007. Rossi finished ninth in the championship standings.

After his stint at the Formula Renault 3.5, Rossi made his GP2 Series debut in the Bahrain round in 2013. After replacing Chinese driver Ma Qinghua, Rossi finished third in his debut race. On July 16, 2014, Rossi announced he had departed Caterham's GP2 team, and later joined Campos Racing at the Hockenheimring, replacing Kimiya Sato. He joined Racing Engineering for the 2015 season opposite British rookie Jordan King, and finished second in the championship.

=== Formula One (2012–16) ===
Rossi was one of three drivers linked to the US-based Formula One team US F1, along with José María López and Jonathan Summerton. Rossi was contracted to be the reserve and test driver before the team folded. He has also tested the 2009-spec BMW Sauber F1.09 Formula One car as part of Formula One's young driver test in Jerez. This was earned for winning the Formula BMW World Final. The test earned Rossi his FIA Super License; at the time, Rossi was the only American to hold one.

==== 2012–14: Caterham ====
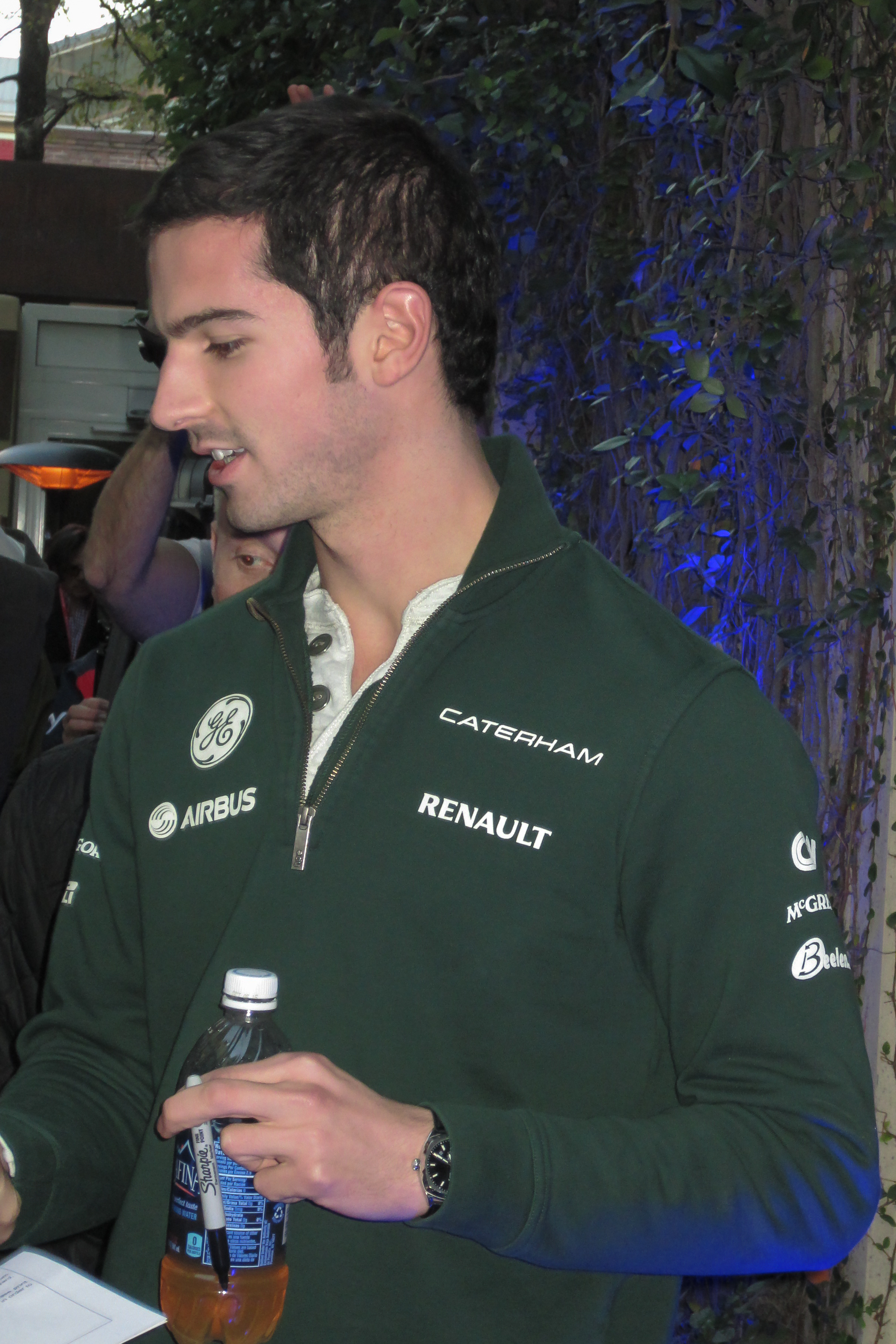
Rossi at the 2013 United States Grand Prix, where he participated in FP1 for Caterham F1

For the 2012 Formula One season, Rossi joined Caterham F1 as a test driver alongside reserve driver Giedo van der Garde. At the Spanish round, he drove Heikki Kovalainen's car in the first practice session, becoming the first American to drive in a Formula One session (during a race weekend) since Scott Speed at the 2007 European Grand Prix. In 2013, Rossi drove for Caterham in the first practice session of the Canadian Grand Prix and at Silverstone in July for the young driver test.

Later in the season, he again participated in the first practice session at the United States Grand Prix, his home race. In 2014, Rossi drove the Caterham in the first practice session of the Canadian Grand Prix. He departed Caterham following the departure of Tony Fernandes and the entrance of new Swiss and Middle Eastern investors in July 2014.

==== 2014–16: Marussia/Manor ====
Following his departure from Caterham, Rossi joined Marussia F1 as reserve driver for the remainder of the 2014 season. He was initially set to make his Formula One debut at the Belgian Grand Prix, replacing British driver Max Chilton, although Marussia later reversed that decision. Rossi later was set to replace the injured Jules Bianchi at the Russian Grand Prix, but Marussia later decided to only run a single car for Chilton.

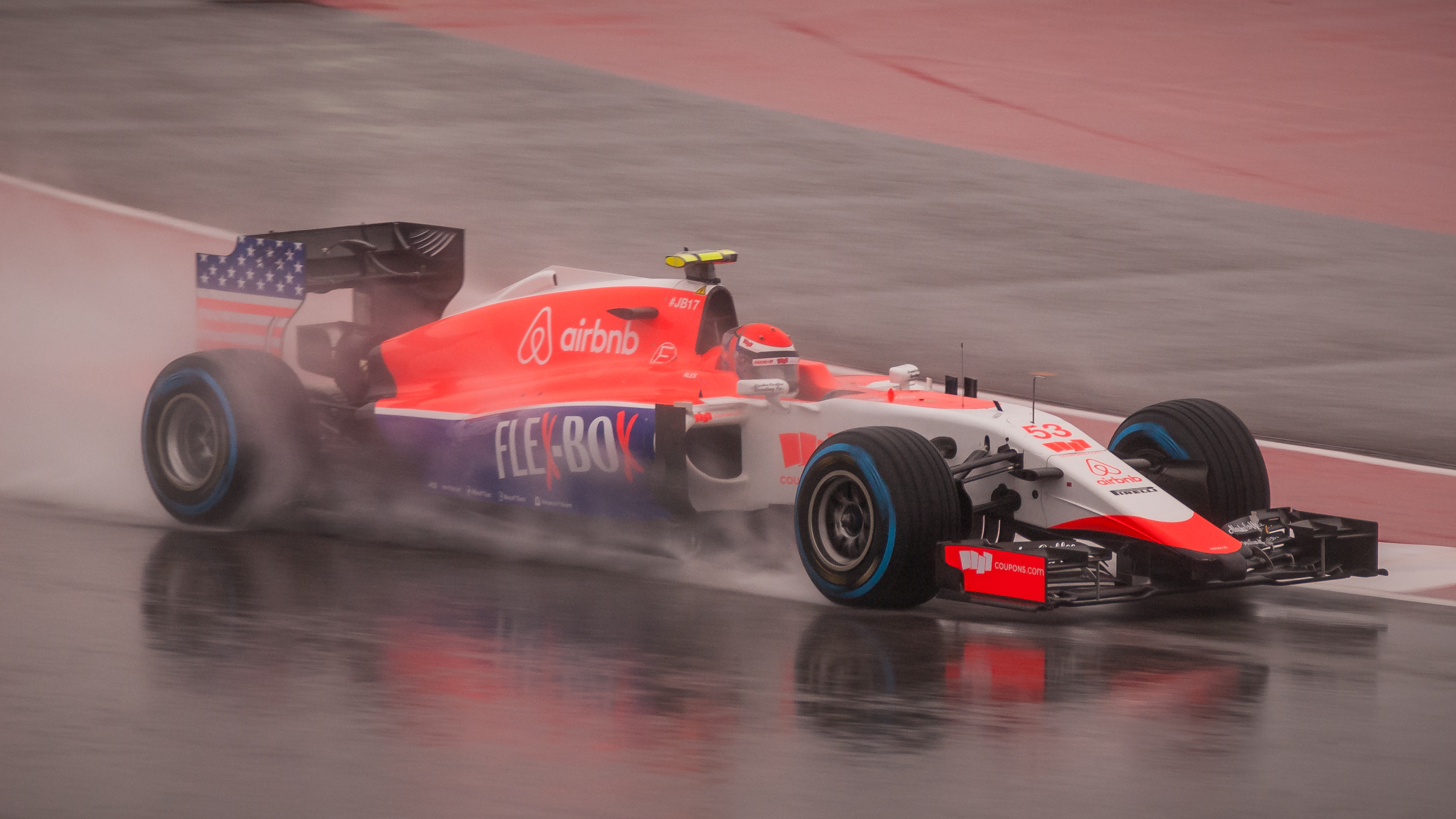
Rossi at the 2015 United States Grand Prix

Rossi continued as a reserve driver into 2015 for the newly formed Manor Marussia F1 Team. He finally made his debut at the Singapore Grand Prix. Rossi chose No. 53 as his career car number in honor of Herbie; his original choice was No. 16, which Rossi used in his karting career, but the number was already claimed as a reserve number by Red Bull Racing.

Rossi qualified 20th and last for his debut, but rallied to finish 14th, just ahead of teammate Will Stevens (fifteenth), despite losing radio communication with his crew around the halfway point of the Grand Prix. Rossi would go on to enter five of the final seven races of the 2015 season. At the Japanese Grand Prix, Rossi finished 18th, again one place above Stevens. He would go on to equal Manor Marussia's best result of the season at his home race, the United States Grand Prix, finishing 12th, and becoming the first American driver to race at a track purpose-built for Formula One in the United States. Rossi then took 15th at the Mexican Grand Prix before completing his five-race stint at the Brazilian Grand Prix with a 19th place finish.

Despite signing for Andretti Autosport in the IndyCar Series, Rossi returned as a reserve driver for the reformed Manor Racing for the 2016 season. After Rio Haryanto lost his ride at Manor following the German Grand Prix, Rossi was offered the opportunity to take his place as a full-time driver; however, he declined the offer, stating: "My management and I are in constant communications with Manor and we knew there might be an opportunity to race for the last half of the 2016 season. We gave it careful thought but declined the race seat due to my IndyCar contract." On October 3, 2016, Rossi confirmed he would give up his reserve driver role at Manor following the 2016 season to focus on the IndyCar Series full-time.

Rossi revealed that back in 2014, he was in negotiations with Gene Haas about driving for his newly established F1 team for 2016. However, a deal never came to fruition, as Haas opted to sign Romain Grosjean and Esteban Gutiérrez for their debut season.

=== Sports car racing (2013–14, 2019–present) ===
==== 2013: Sports car debut at Le Mans ====
In 2013, Rossi made his debut at the 24 Hours of Le Mans, driving for Greaves Motorsport in a Zytek Z11SN. Rossi was signed as a replacement for Christian Zugel, who was prevented from participating by family and business matters. He and co-drivers Eric Lux and Tom Kimber-Smith finished 23rd overall.

==== 2014: Daytona with DeltaWing ====
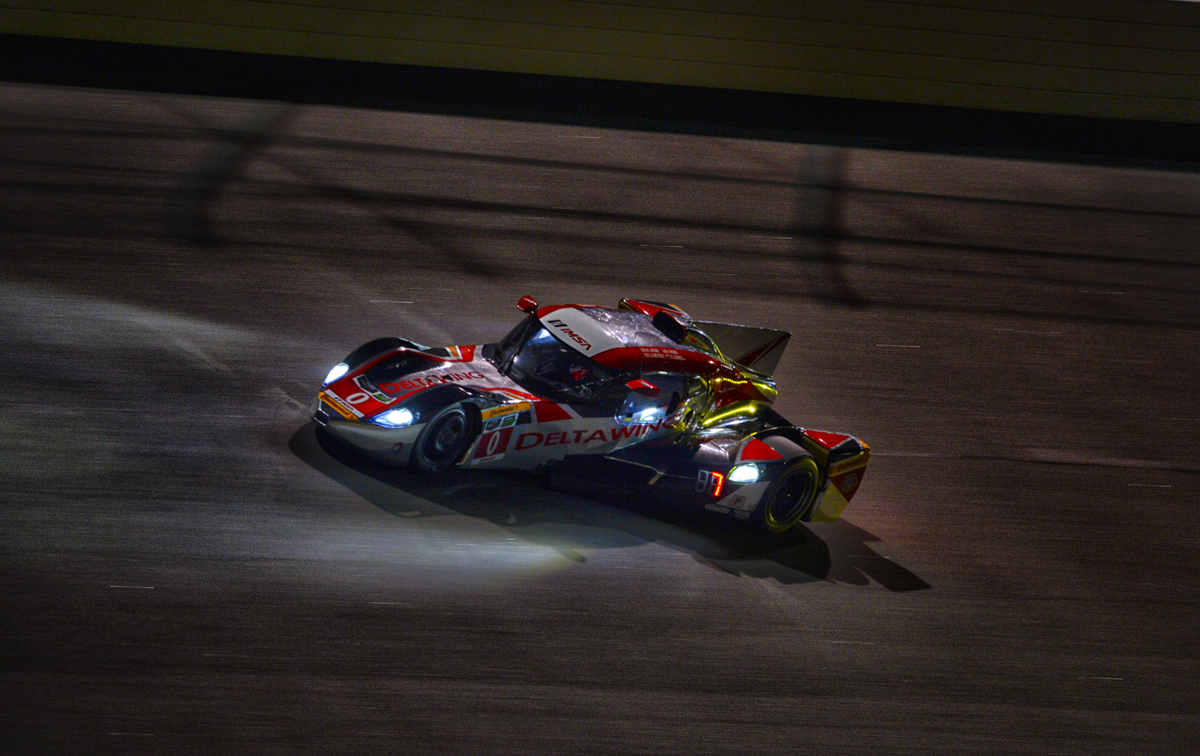
Rossi's DeltaWing at Daytona

Rossi competed in the 2014 24 Hours of Daytona for the DeltaWing team, joining full-time drivers Andy Meyrick and Katherine Legge, along with eventual 2014 Indy Lights champion Gabby Chaves.

==== 2019–20: Return to sports cars with Penske ====
On December 7, 2018, Rossi announced that he would be joining Acura Team Penske for both the 24 Hours of Daytona and the 12 Hours of Sebring in the 2019 IMSA WeatherTech SportsCar Championship. Rossi replaced fellow IndyCar driver Graham Rahal after Rahal was unable to get an adequate seat fitting to optimize his performance. Rossi teamed with fellow IndyCar Series driver Hélio Castroneves and sports car driver Ricky Taylor to finish third overall and in class at Daytona. The second half of the race was marred by non-stop rain, with Rossi conceding that the team's rivals were slightly stronger than them in wet conditions.

Rossi returned to Penske's No. 7 Acura for the 2020 24 Hours of Daytona. Rossi's team was compromised less than four hours into the race when Castroneves was involved in an accident with Harry Tincknell.

==== 2021–22: Endurance with Wayne Taylor Racing ====
On November 23, 2020, Wayne Taylor Racing announced that Rossi would be the team's third driver for the endurance races, starting with the 2021 24 Hours of Daytona. Rossi co-drove the team's No. 10 Acura ARX-05 to the overall win with former Penske teammates Castroneves and Taylor, as well as Filipe Albuquerque. Rossi, Taylor, and Albuquerque went on to win the 2021 Michelin Endurance Cup.

=== IndyCar Series (2016–present) ===
==== Andretti Autosport (2016–2022) ====
===== 2016: Indianapolis 500 win =====
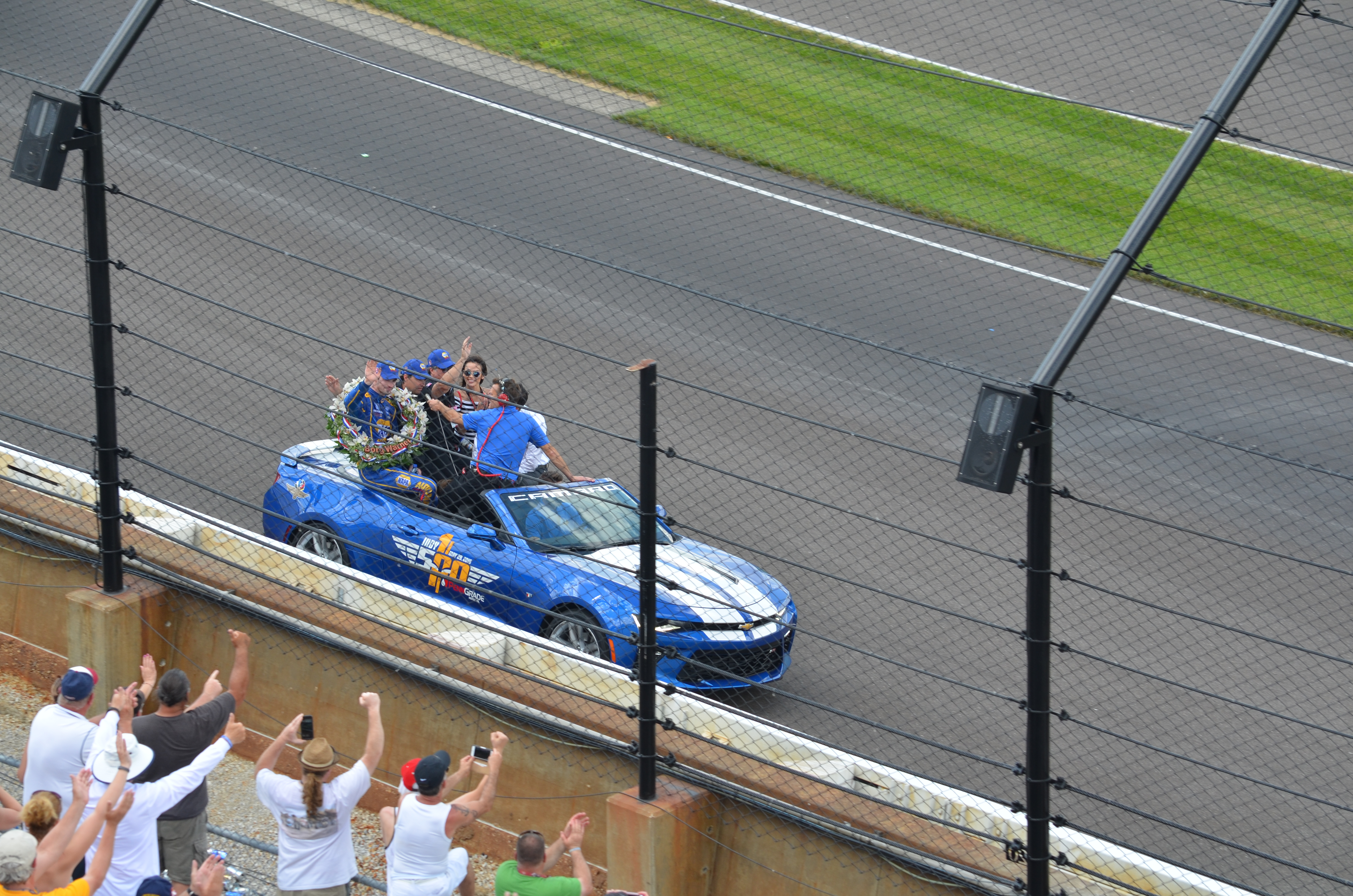
Rossi after winning the 2016 Indianapolis 500

While Rossi grew up watching the IndyCar Series as his favorite form of racing, Rossi had previously claimed to having little interest in racing in it himself, particularly because of a hesitance to race on ovals.

Nevertheless, after Manor announced Pascal Wehrlein and Rio Haryanto as the team's 2016 drivers, Rossi made the switch to the IndyCar Series with Andretti Autosport for the 2016 season. Prior to signing with Andretti, Rossi had previously visited with Dale Coyne Racing in 2014 and admitted he was "very, very close" to signing with them for the 2015 IndyCar season.

Because the deal was finalized so late, Rossi missed the majority of preseason testing, only getting to complete one session at Sebring International Raceway. Rossi made his IndyCar debut at the season-opening Grand Prix of St. Petersburg, qualifying in the rear of the field in 19th and finishing as the highest-placed rookie in 12th. Rossi then made his oval debut at the next race in Phoenix, running as high as seventh before brushing the wall in the final laps of the race.

The highlight of Rossi's first season with the team was winning the Indianapolis 500 after starting from the eleventh position on the grid. Rossi was the top rookie in qualifying for the race and led the final few laps as the cars ahead of him on track ran low on fuel and pitted. Rossi managed his fuel over the final stint to win, then ran dry after the finish and had to be towed to victory lane. He would later earn a second top-five finish at the season finale at Sonoma Raceway. Rossi was named the series' 2016 Rookie of the Year on September 19.

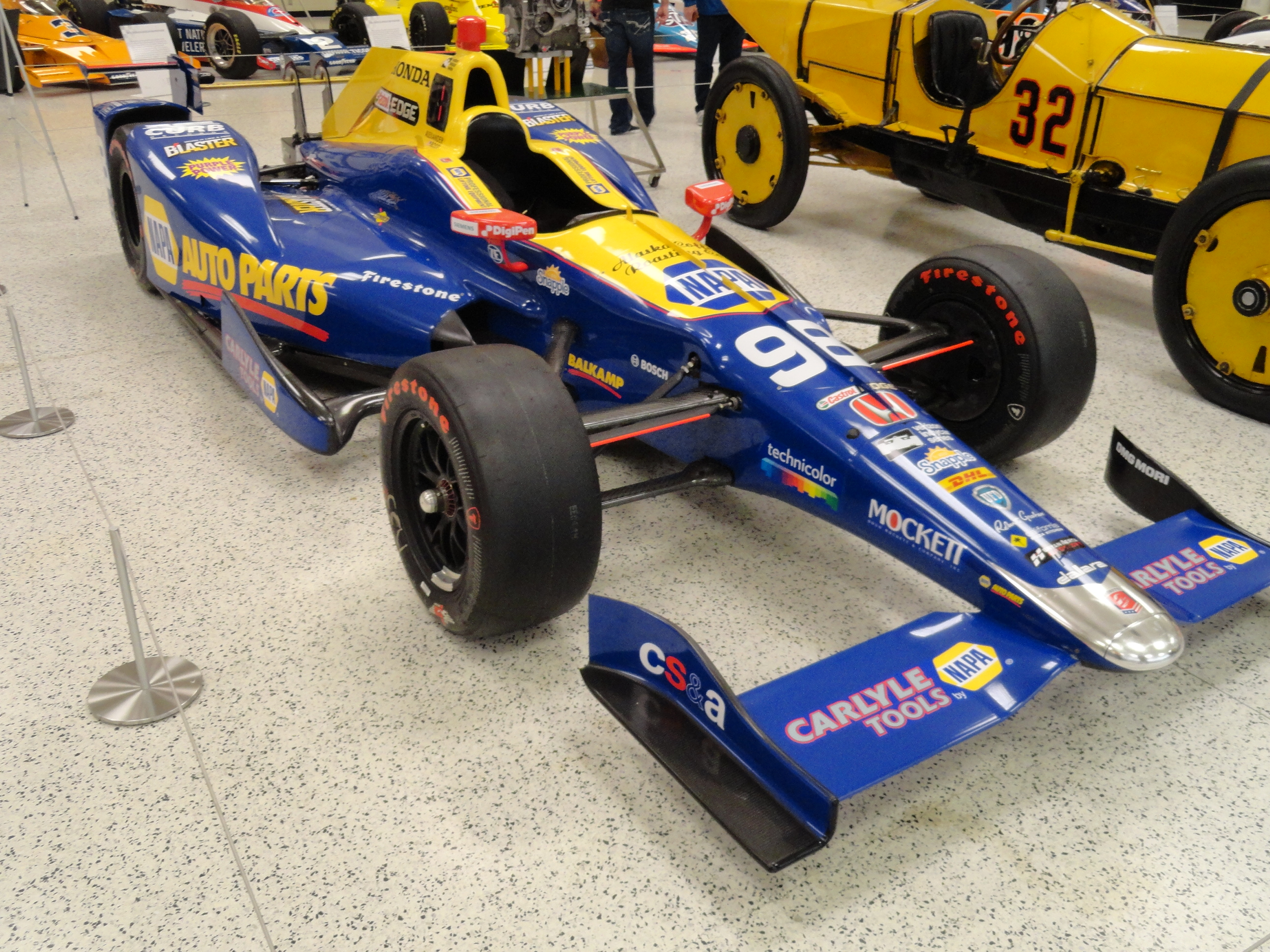
Rossi's race-winning car at the Indianapolis Motor Speedway Museum (pictured in 2017)

===== 2017: End-of-season breakthrough =====
On October 3, Rossi announced he would return to Andretti for the 2017 season, signing a multi-year contract. At Long Beach, Rossi was running in second place when his engine failed. Rossi started the defense of his Indianapolis 500 victory by qualifying on the front row for the race. He spent much of the first half of the race amongst the leaders, but finished seventh after experiencing fueling issues.

Later in the season, Rossi drove to a second-place finish in the Honda Indy Toronto after starting in eighth in what he called a "breakthrough" race for his team. It was his first podium of the 2017 season. At Pocono, Rossi earned his third career podium by finishing third despite encountering a problem with his car's fuel-mixture knob.

On September 1, Rossi confirmed that he would remain with Andretti through at least the 2019 season; despite having signed a multi-year extension after 2016, Rossi had been considering a move to Schmidt Peterson Motorsports due to his loyalty to Honda, but re-signed with Andretti once the team confirmed they would continue using Honda engines in the future. The next day, Rossi earned his first career pole at Watkins Glen International; he would go on to win the race as well for his second career victory.

===== 2018–2019: Championship contender =====
On December 7, 2017, Andretti Autosport announced plans for Rossi to swap car numbers with teammate Marco Andretti for the 2018 season. Rossi moved to the No. 27 team while Andretti took over the Herta-partnered No. 98.

Rossi's 2018 season began with a controversial third-place finish at the Grand Prix of St. Petersburg. He was running second on the final restart and attempted to pass leader Robert Wickens in the first turn, but got loose and made contact with Wickens, who in turn retired from the race. Rossi argued that while he "[felt] bad" about the contact, he also believed Wickens' defense of the lead forced him into the marbles, causing his car to get loose. However, Wickens said he "expected more" from Rossi, and proceeded to call his move "desperate."

Rossi's driving was further criticized by NBC Sports' Jerry Bonkowski, who opined that he "ruined what was a near-perfect day — make that weekend — for another driver." Ironically, Rossi would again battle with Wickens in the closing stages of the following race at Phoenix, securing another third-place finish behind race winner Josef Newgarden and Wickens.

After the podium celebration, both Wickens and Rossi made light of the St. Petersburg clash; Rossi stated that Wickens "should definitely have two podiums right now," to which the Canadian jokingly replied, "About time you said it!" The following week, Rossi qualified on pole for the Grand Prix of Long Beach. He converted the pole position into his third career win, leading race runner-up and 2014 IndyCar Series champion Will Power to call Rossi "a standout of the field right now in every respect."

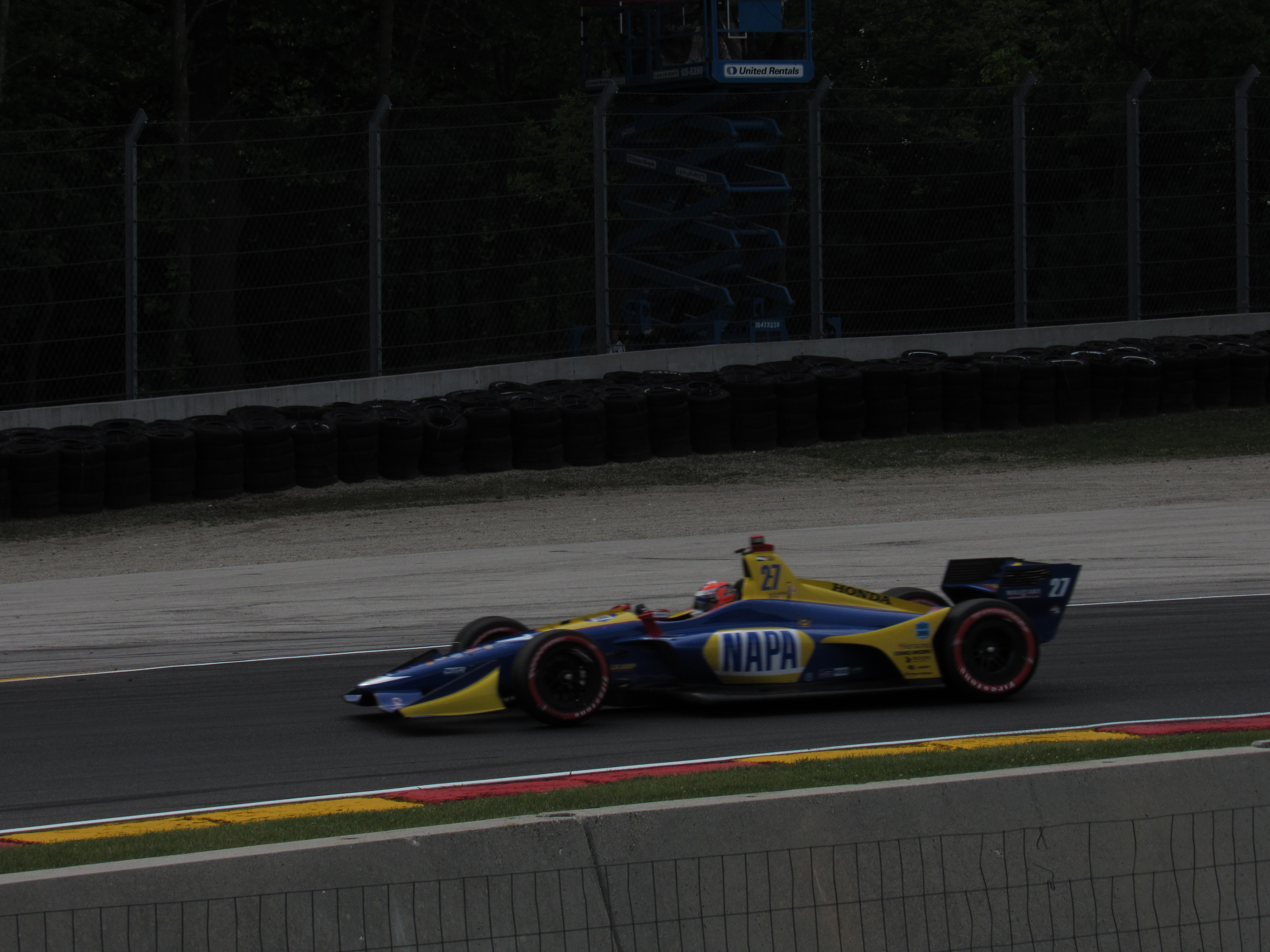
Rossi on track at Road America

Rossi began the Indianapolis 500 that year from the last row on the grid, starting in 32nd place. He completed a series of impressive overtakes throughout the race, leading him to a fourth-place finish. The following week in Detroit, Rossi finished third in race one. He then qualified on pole for the second race and led 46 of the first 63 laps, but he was pressured late in the race by teammate Ryan Hunter-Reay. Rossi proceeded to lock his brakes, overshooting the upcoming turn and leading to a puncture. He was forced to pit, reentering the track in thirteenth and finishing in twelfth.

Rossi rebounded later in the season to win the pole and the race at Mid-Ohio, using a two-stop strategy. The win moved Rossi into second in the Drivers' Championship standings, 46 points behind Scott Dixon. Rossi won the following race at Pocono as well, though the event was overshadowed by a serious accident early in the race involving Wickens (who was injured and airlifted to a local hospital), with the race resulting in a red flag.

At Gateway, Rossi used fuel strategy to finish second, gaining a few points on Dixon. After an eighth-place finish at Portland, Rossi entered the final race at Sonoma 29 points behind Dixon. At the start, he broke his front wing after contact with Andretti, dropping Rossi back in the field. He recovered to place seventh in the race, finishing a total of 57 points behind Dixon in the championship.

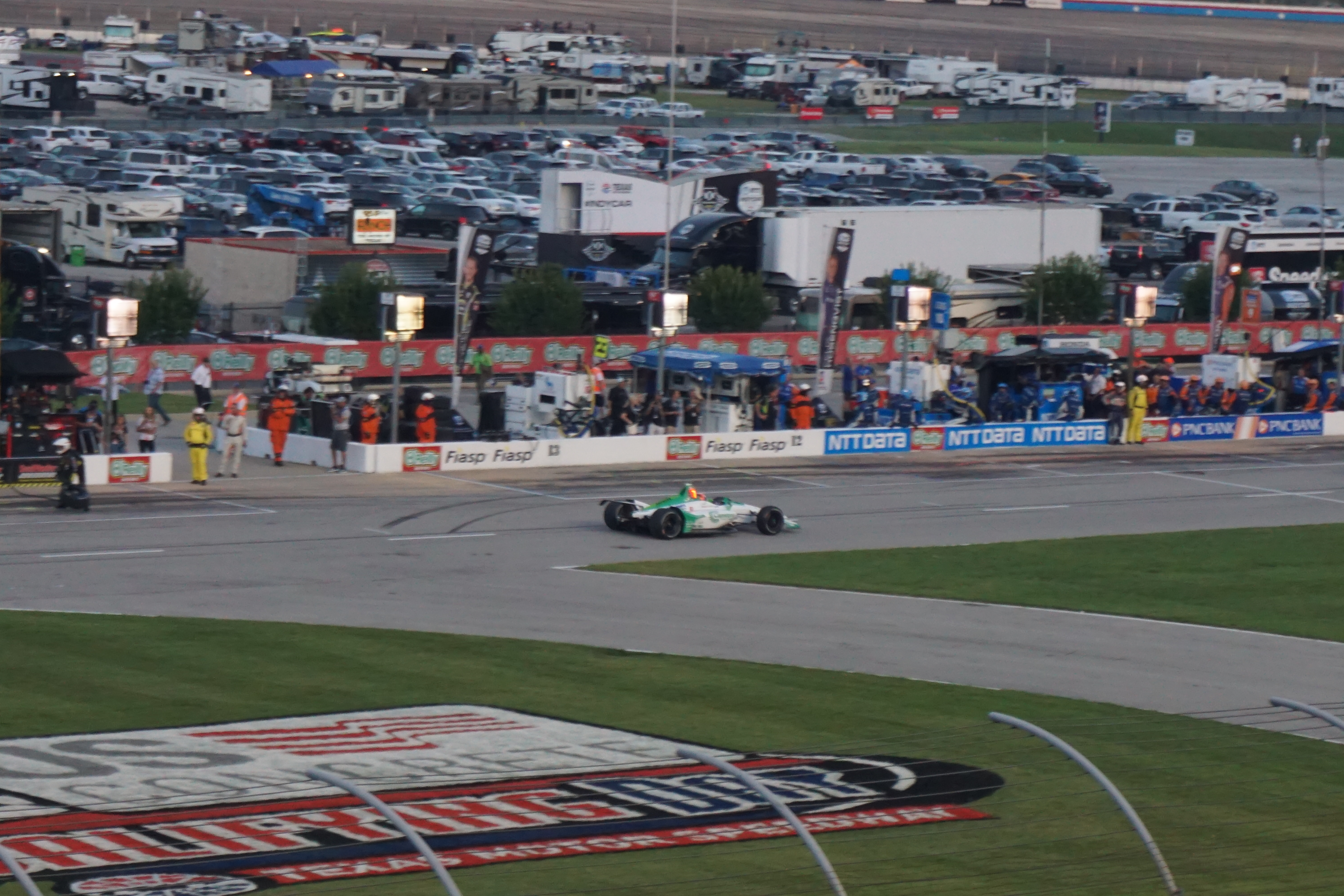
Rossi at Texas Motor Speedway in 2019

Rossi began the 2019 season with a fifth-place finish at St. Petersburg. He scored his first win of 2019 at Long Beach, where Rossi repeated his success from the previous season. Rossi's 20-second margin of victory over Newgarden was the largest margin of victory at Long Beach since Al Unser Jr.'s 23-second margin in 1995. He dedicated the victory to his grandfather; unfortuntely the win came on the day Rossi learned of his death.

At the 2019 Indianapolis 500, Rossi was in contention for the win before encountering a fuel pump problem in the pits on lap 137. The delay resulted in a 23-second pit stop, which likely would have taken him out of contention had Marcus Ericsson not spun entering the pit lane, forcing a caution flag.

On the ensuing restart, Rossi fell from fifth to sixth place, while also being seventh in line as Oriol Servià, a lapped car, was in front of him. Rossi was then held up and blocked by Servia (he would later call his actions "unacceptable" and "one of the most disrespectful things I've ever seen in a racecar"), eventually shaking his fist at the Spanish driver as he finally passed him.

Rossi eventually recovered to pass Simon Pagenaud for the lead and seemed to have the advantage as Pagenaud was in danger of not being able to make it to the end of the race on fuel, but a late caution nullified that advantage. Rossi's Honda lacked the horsepower of Pagenaud's Chevrolet, which was ultimately the deciding factor as he finished the race in second behind Pagenaud.

Rossi's second-place finish at Indianapolis sparked a run of three such finishes in four races as he also finished second at the first Detroit race and at Texas. At Road America in June, Rossi broke through to win with a 28.4-second margin of victory over second-place Will Power. Power stated after the race that he "never actually saw" Rossi due to the length of the gap between the two drivers. At Pocono, Rossi was involved in a first-lap incident with Takuma Sato, with Rossi calling Sato's driving "disgraceful" and saying, "I can't even begin to understand after last year how Takuma thinks any sort of driving like that is acceptable." Rossi would go on to enter the final race at Laguna Seca second in points before fading to third behind Newgarden and Pagenaud.

===== 2020–2021: Struggles =====
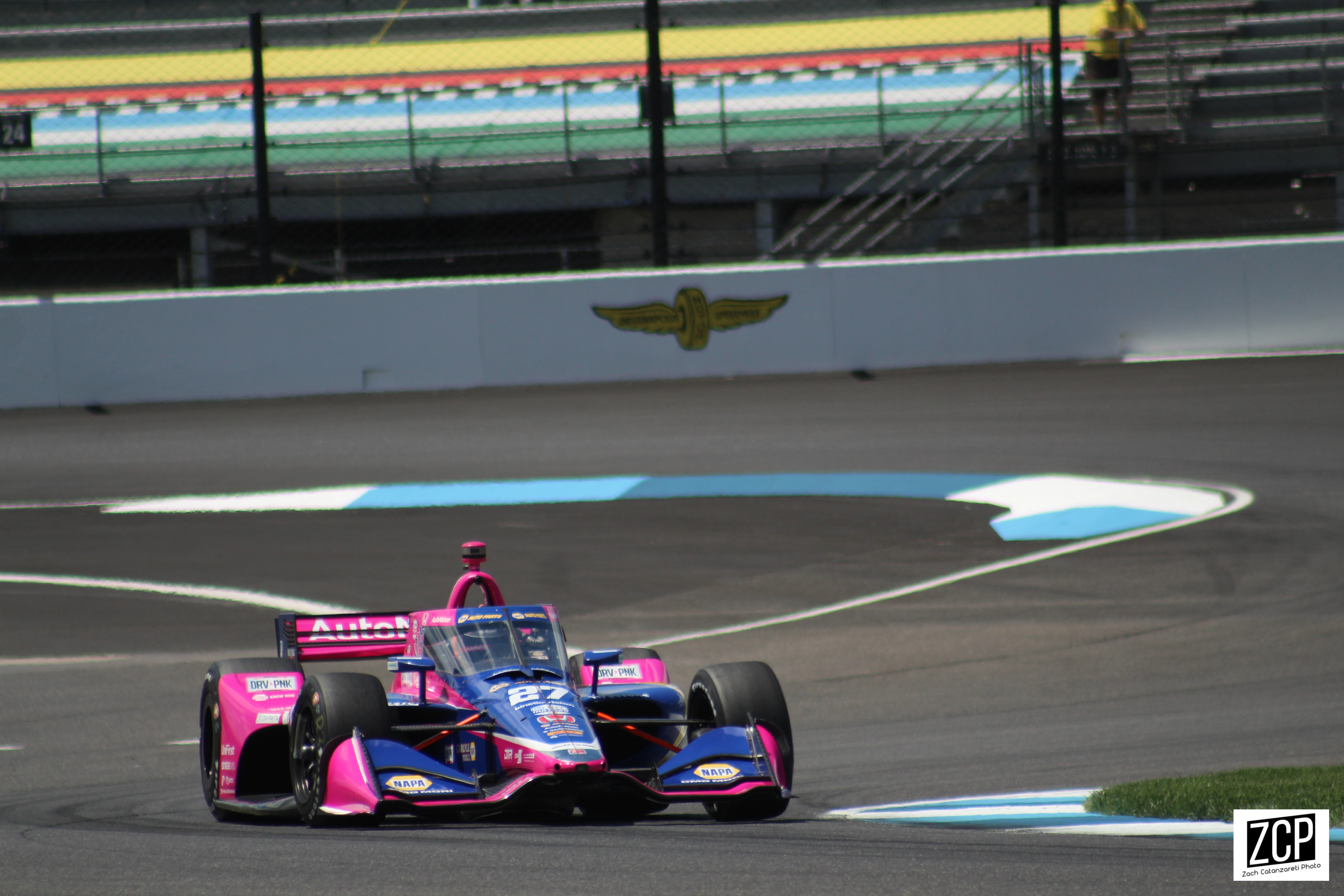
Rossi driving for Andretti Autosport

In the 2020 season, Rossi recorded no wins for the first time in his IndyCar career despite being in leading situations throughout the season, most notably in St. Petersburg, where he crashed out of the lead. However, Rossi collected five podiums.

The 2021 season proved to be a struggle for Rossi and Andretti Autosport, as he once again failed to win any races that year and only secured one podium finish at Portland.

===== 2022: A bounceback season =====
The 2022 season started slowly, with Rossi only collecting two top-tens before the Indianapolis 500 where he finished fifth, his best finish at the speedway since 2019. Following the Indianapolis 500, Andretti Autosport announced that Rossi would leave the team at the end of the 2022 season and would be replaced by Kyle Kirkwood. The following day, Rossi announced he had signed a contract with Arrow McLaren SP for 2023 and beyond.

Rossi's performance improved significantly following the Indianapolis 500. He finished second to Will Power in Detroit, and finished third in the following race at Road America after collecting his first pole position since Detroit in 2019. After struggling in the following rounds, Rossi finally broke through on July 30, 2022, when he won the Gallagher Grand Prix on the IMS Road Course and thus ended his 49-race winless drought in the IndyCar Series. Rossi's season then gained some momentum in the final five races, with a fourth place in Nashville and two top-tens in Portland and Laguna Seca. Rossi finished tenth in the standings to round off his seven-year stint with Andretti.

==== Arrow McLaren SP (2023–2024) ====
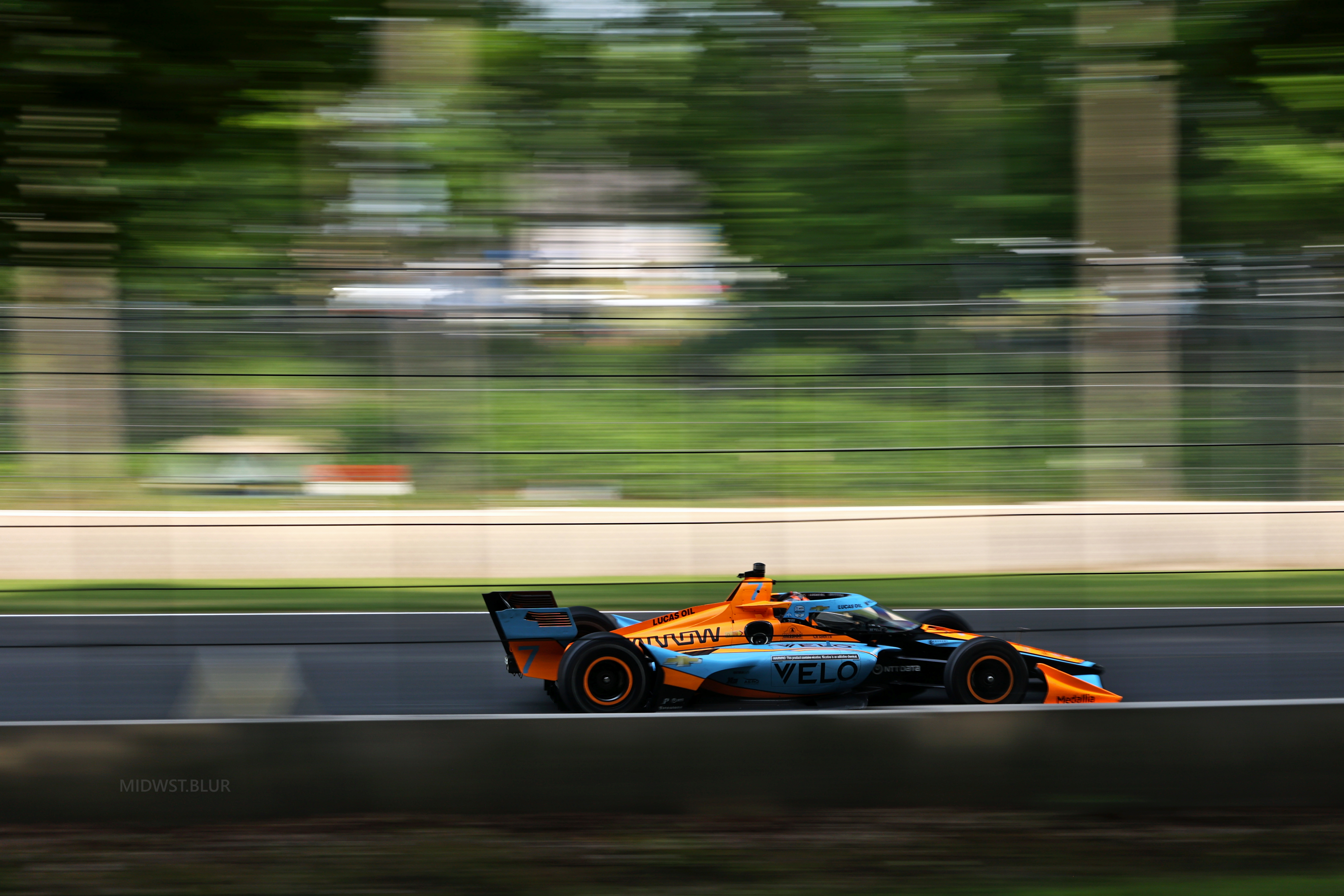
Rossi driving for Arrow McLaren at Road America in 2023

Rossi's season began much improved with a fourth place finish at the first race of the season in St. Petersburg. In the next race in Texas, Rossi collided with Kyle Kirkwood in the pitlane and ended up finishing 22nd. He retired with two laps remaining in Long Beach with a left-rear suspension failure, picked up an eighth place finish in Alabama, and his first podium with Arrow McLaren at the Indy Road Course.

Rossi's Indy 500 campaign looked strong throughout May, and he qualified in seventh place. Rossi ultimately finished fifth, being the only McLaren to finish the race after Pato O'Ward and Felix Rosenqvist were caught up in separate incidents late in the race.

However, Rossi's title challenge would dwindle towards the end of the season. He only picked up two top-five finishes and was involved in incidents in Toronto, Nashville, and Portland, which saw Rossi come away with minimal points and he ultimately finish ninth in the drivers' standings for the third time in the last four seasons.

In July 2024, Rossi announced that he was departing Arrow McLaren at the end of the 2024 season and was replaced by Christian Lundgaard.

==== Ed Carpenter Racing (2025–present) ====
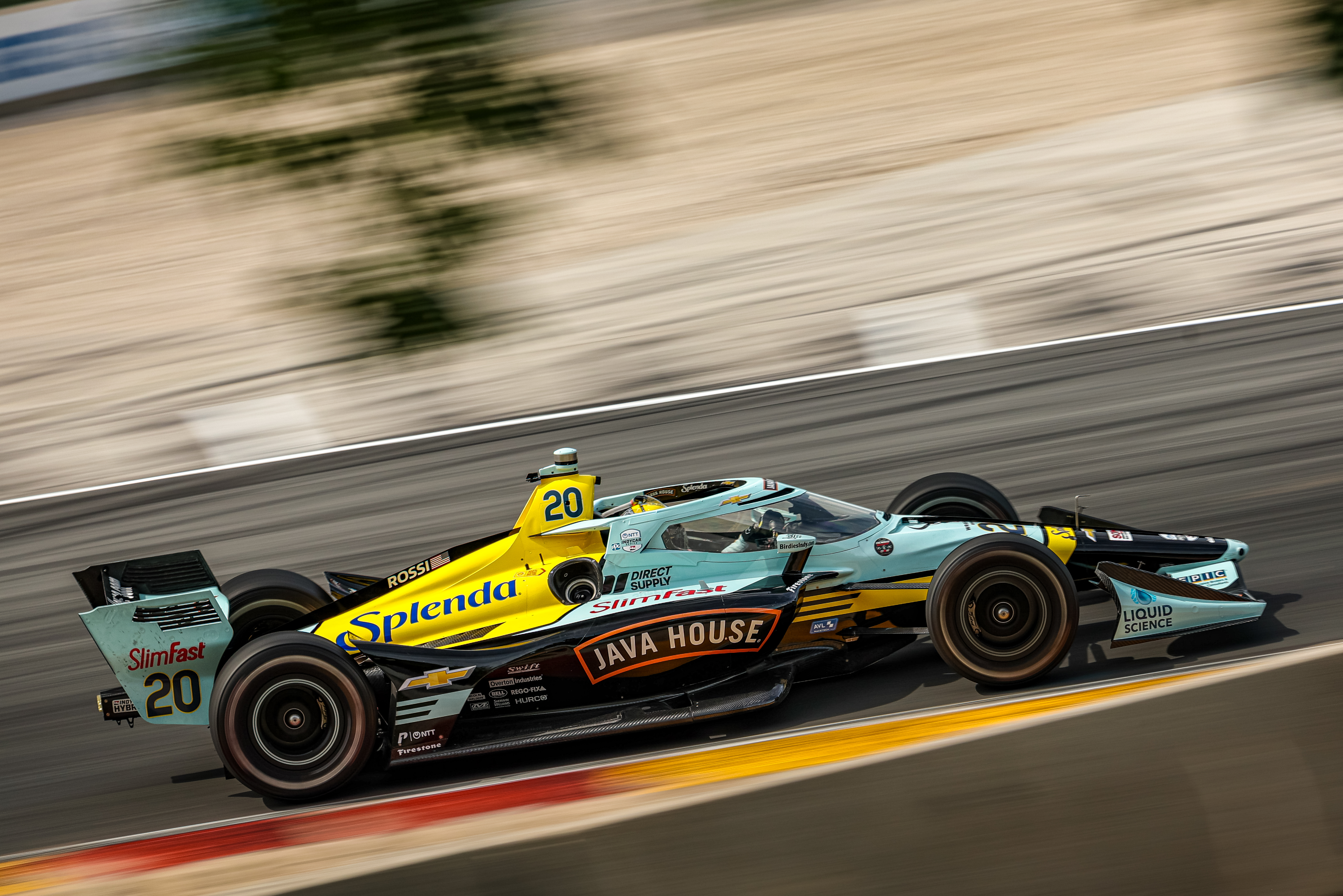
Rossi driving for Ed Carpenter Racing at Road America in 2026

On September 25, 2024, Ed Carpenter Racing announced that they had signed Rossi to drive for them in the 2025 season, replacing the departing Rinus VeeKay. He retired from the 2025 Indianapolis 500 on lap 73, after his car caught on fire in the pits.

In 2026, Rossi struggled for much of the season and finished 15th in the championship standings, but ended the season with his first podium finish for ECR by finishing third at Laguna Seca.

=== Off-road racing (2018–19, 2021) ===
Rossi competed in his first-ever Baja 1000 in 2018, driving with Jeff Proctor in the No. 709 Honda Ridgeline, becoming the fifth Indianapolis 500 winner to participate in the race. Rossi explained that he was eager to try a different racing series, saying, "It's just one of those iconic races. There's a Honda connection, so [when offered the ride] I just figured, 'Why not?' I'm pretty excited about it. It's something new, something different. I'm looking forward to the experience." Around 33 miles into the race, Rossi nearly collided with a spectator's car that was travelling the wrong way on the course. His team placed second in their class in the final results.

Rossi returned to the Baja 1000 in 2019. Rossi and Proctor's truck was leading when Rossi rolled over the vehicle. The truck was able to continue for about 100 miles after the crash, but eventually retired due to mechanical problems.

After skipping the 2020 edition due to scheduling clashes, another Baja 1000 start came in 2021. Sharing the Ridgeline with Proctor, Richard Glaszczak, and Steve Hengeveld, Rossi's team claimed the Class 7 victory.

=== Supercars Championship (2019) ===
On August 15, 2019, Rossi announced plans to make his debut in the Bathurst 1000 in October, competing with fellow IndyCar Series driver James Hinchcliffe as a wildcard entry for Walkinshaw Andretti United, a partnership between Andretti Autosport and United Autosports. The pair started the race on the back row of the grid in 25th, finishing 19th before being promoted to eighteenth after a penalty demoted DJR Team Penske's Fabian Coulthard from sixth to 21st.

== Personal life ==
Rossi was born on September 25, 1991, in Auburn, California, and raised in Nevada City, often waking up at 4 a.m. local time on Sunday mornings to watch the Formula One races in Europe. He graduated from Auburn's Forest Lake Christian High School at age 16 in order to begin pursuing his European racing career.

Rossi is a fan of the National Football League's New England Patriots; despite not growing up in Boston, Rossi explains, "I've been a Patriots fan really since 2009, solely because of when I was living in Europe, the only NFL games I could watch on the television package they had at the time was Patriots or Green Bay Packers games. I was originally a San Francisco 49ers fan, but then considering I didn't watch any of the games for about seven years, I switched to being a Patriots fan despite not being from Boston." Rossi serves as a TAG Heuer ambassador alongside former NFL quarterback Tom Brady.

Rossi is a Protestant Christian. He cites his two most important life influences as God and his parents, adding, "I believe there's always a greater plan. I feel that driving race cars and being involved in Formula One and motorsports is my opportunity to share my beliefs." Rossi describes having his faith while growing up as "something that was hugely important to me. That carried all the way through my entire childhood. I was very fortunate to be a product of a Christian family with my mom and dad and grandmother." Rossi was a speaker at the Fellowship of Christian Athletes' "Nights of Champions" program in 2017. When asked in mid-2019 about his status at Andretti Autosport beyond the end of that season, Rossi replied that his career path was "in God's hands."

Rossi now resides in Indianapolis with his wife, Kelly, son, Benjamin, and two dogs, Brunner and Diane.

== Media appearances ==
Rossi's 2016 Indianapolis 500 win earned him a nomination at the 2016 ESPY Awards for Best Driver. He attended the awards ceremony on July 13, although the award went to NASCAR's 2015 Sprint Cup Series champion, Kyle Busch.

In March 2017, Rossi was a guest on an episode of Harry Connick Jr.'s eponymous talk show, Harry. He has appeared on The Rich Eisen Show on two occasions, in July 2016 after winning the Indianapolis 500, and again in January 2018.

Rossi appeared on the 30th season of CBS' The Amazing Race with fellow IndyCar driver Conor Daly as his teammate. They won the fourth leg of the race, but they were eventually eliminated, finishing in fourth place. On April 19, 2018, he appeared on the season four premiere of CNBC's Jay Leno's Garage alongside Tanner Foust.

Rossi co-hosts the podcast Off Track with Hinch and Rossi, with fellow driver, James Hinchcliffe.

== Helmet ==
Rossi's Manor Marussia F1 helmet featured a red, white, and blue design with prominent sponsorship placement for Alaska Coffee Roasting, one of his longtime personal sponsors. Rossi also ran a "#JB17" decal on his visor honoring his former teammate, Jules Bianchi.

Since moving to IndyCar with Andretti, Rossi has continued running the #JB17 decal, though it has since been moved to an area just below the visor on either side of the helmet. The basic design remains similar to his helmet from his brief Formula One career, though the blue background has changed to a combination of black and gray, and additional sponsorship placements have been added to represent his partnerships with TAG Heuer and Honda. For the 2018 Indianapolis 500, TAG Heuer tapped street artist Alec Monopoly to design Rossi's helmet for the race. The helmet featured a more colorful design with graphics meant to resemble street art.

In 2020, Rossi used some of his helmets to raise awareness for charitable causes. After his Bathurst 1000 debut, Rossi auctioned off his helmet, donating the proceeds to Wires Wildlife Rescue in aid of the Australian bushfires. His Indianapolis 500 helmet in August was designed by TAG Heuer to honor frontline workers and heroes in the midst of the COVID-19 pandemic.

== Racing record ==
=== Career summary ===
Season	Series	Team	Races	Wins	Poles	FLaps	Podiums	Points	Position
2006	Formula TR 1600 Pro Series	Odyssey Motorsports	11	4	5	?	6	409	7th
2007	Formula BMW Americas	Team Apex Racing	14	3	1	2	5	410	**3rd**
2007	Formula BMW World Final	EuroInternational	1	0	0	0	0	N/A	NC
2008	Formula BMW Americas	EuroInternational	15	10	10	9	11	249	**1st**
2008	Formula BMW Europe	EuroInternational	2	0	0	0	0	N/A†	N/A†
2008	Formula BMW World Final	EuroInternational	1	1	0	1	1	N/A	**1st**
2009	International Formula Master	Hitech Racing	4	0	0	0	0	52	4th
2009	International Formula Master	ISR Racing	12	3	0	1	5	52	4th
2009–10	GP2 Asia Series	Ocean Racing Technology	2	0	0	0	0	12	9th
2009–10	GP2 Asia Series	MalaysiaQi-Meritus.com	6	0	0	0	0	12	9th
2010	GP3 Series	ART Grand Prix	14	2	2	1	5	38	4th
2010	Formula Renault 3.5 Series	ISR Racing	1	0	0	0	0	0	NC
2011	Formula Renault 3.5 Series	Fortec Motorsport	17	2	0	1	5	156	**3rd**
2011	GP2 Final	Caterham Team AirAsia	2	0	0	0	0	0	10th
2012	Formula Renault 3.5 Series	Arden Caterham	17	0	0	4	1	63	11th
2012	Formula One	Caterham F1 Team	Test driver						
2013	GP2 Series	EQ8 Caterham Racing	20	1	1	0	4	92	9th
2013	FIA World Endurance Championship - LMP2	Greaves Motorsport	1	0	0	0	0	20	19th
2013	24 Hours of Le Mans - LMP2	Greaves Motorsport	1	0	0	0	0	N/A	10th
2013	Formula One	Caterham F1 Team	Test driver						
2014	GP2 Series	EQ8 Caterham Racing	10	0	0	0	0	12	21st
2014	GP2 Series	Campos Racing	2	0	0	0	0	12	21st
2014	United SportsCar Championship - Prototype	DeltaWing Racing Cars	1	0	0	0	0	16	65th
2014	Formula One	Caterham F1 Team	Test driver						
2014	Formula One	Marussia F1 Team	Test driver						
2015	GP2 Series	Racing Engineering	22	3	1	0	7	181.5	**2nd**
2015	Formula One	Manor Marussia F1 Team	5	0	0	0	0	0	20th
2016	IndyCar Series	Andretti Herta Autosport with Curb Agajanian	16	1	0	2	1	430	11th
2016	Formula One	Manor F1 Team	Reserve driver						
2017	IndyCar Series	Andretti Herta Autosport with Curb Agajanian	17	1	1	1	3	494	7th
2018	IndyCar Series	Andretti Autosport	17	3	3	1	8	621	**2nd**
2019	IndyCar Series	Andretti Autosport	17	2	2	0	7	608	**3rd**
2019	IMSA SportsCar Championship - DPi	Acura Team Penske	2	0	0	0	1	58	23rd
2019	Supercars Championship	Walkinshaw Andretti United	1	0	0	0	0	102	52nd
2020	IndyCar Series	Andretti Autosport	14	0	0	1	5	317	9th
2020	IMSA SportsCar Championship - DPi	Acura Team Penske	3	0	0	0	1	78	20th
2021	IndyCar Series	Andretti Autosport	16	0	0	0	1	324	10th
2021	IMSA SportsCar Championship - DPi	Konica Minolta Acura	4	1	0	0	3	1348	10th
2022	IndyCar Series	Andretti Autosport	17	1	1	0	3	381	9th
2022	IMSA SportsCar Championship - DPi	Konica Minolta Acura	1	0	1	0	1	355	20th
2023	IndyCar Series	Arrow McLaren	17	0	0	0	1	375	9th
2024	IndyCar Series	Arrow McLaren	16	0	0	0	1	366	10th
2024	IMSA SportsCar Championship - GTD Pro	Pfaff Motorsports	1	0	0	0	0	235	40th
2025	IndyCar Series	Ed Carpenter Racing	17	0	0	0	0	297	15th
2026	IndyCar Series	Ed Carpenter Racing	18	0	0	0	1	307	15th

† – As Rossi was a guest driver, he was ineligible to score points.
* Season still in progress

=== Complete Formula BMW USA results ===
(key) (Races in bold indicate pole position) (Races in italics indicate fastest lap)

Year	Entrant	1	2	3	4	5	6	7	8	9	10	11	12	13	14	15	16	17	DC	Points
2007	Hearn Motorsports	MMP; 1; 3	MMP; 2; 4	CGV; 1; 13†	CGV; 2; 10	IMS; 1; 4	IMS; 2; 6												3rd	410
2007	Team Apex Racing USA							LIM; 1; 16	LIM; 2; 3	**SJO**; **1**; 1	SJO; 2 Ret	ROA; 1; 1	ROA; 2; 9	MOS; 1; 1	MOS; 2; 6				3rd	410
2008	EuroInternational	**LAG**; **1**; 10	LAG; 2; 2	CGV; 1; 3	CGV; 2; 1	**MOH**; **1**; 1	**MOH**; **2**; 1	LIM; 1 C	LIM; 2; 5	**LIM**; **3**; 1	**ROA**; **1**; 1	**ROA**; **2**; 1	ROA; 3; 11	**NJM**; **1**; 1	**NJM**; **2**; 1	NJM; 3 C	**INT**; **1**; 1	**INT**; **2**; 1	1st	250

=== Complete International Formula Master results ===
(key) (Races in bold indicate pole position) (Races in italics indicate fastest lap)

Year	Entrant	1	2	3	4	5	6	7	8	9	10	11	12	13	14	15	16	DC	Points
2009	Hitech Junior Team	PAU; 1; 10	PAU; 2; 4	VAL; 1; 7	VAL; 2; 12													4th	52
2009	ISR Racing					BRN; 1; 7	BRN; 2; 1	BRH; 1; 7	BRH; 2; 2	HUN; 1; 3	HUN; 2 Ret	SPA; 1; 5	SPA; 2; 1	OSC; 1; 4	OSC; 2; 7	IMO; 1; 5	IMO; 2; 1	4th	52

=== Complete GP3 Series results ===
(key) (Races in bold indicate pole position) (Races in italics indicate fastest lap)

Year	Entrant	1	2	3	4	5	6	7	8	9	10	11	12	13	14	15	16	DC	Points
2010	ART Grand Prix	CAT; FEA; 8	CAT; SPR; 1	IST; FEA; 4	IST; SPR; 3	VAL; FEA; Ret	VAL; SPR; Ret	SIL; FEA; 5	SIL; SPR; 2	HOC; FEA; Ret	HOC; SPR; 8	HUN; FEA; 8	HUN; SPR; 1	SPA; FEA; 13	SPA; SPR; 2	MNZ; FEA; Ret	MNZ; SPR; 15	4th	38

=== Complete Formula Renault 3.5 Series results ===
(key) (Races in bold indicate pole position) (Races in italics indicate fastest lap)

Year	Team	1	2	3	4	5	6	7	8	9	10	11	12	13	14	15	16	17	Pos	Points
2010	ISR Racing	ALC; 1	ALC; 2	SPA; 1	SPA; 2	MON; 1 Ret	BRN; 1	BRN; 2	MAG; 1	MAG; 2	HUN; 1	HUN; 2	HOC; 1	HOC; 2	SIL; 1	SIL; 2	CAT; 1	CAT; 2	NC	0
2011	Fortec Motorsport	ALC; 1; 1	ALC; 2; 2	SPA; 1; 7	SPA; 2; 7	MNZ; 1; 17	MNZ; 2; 2	MON; 1 Ret	NÜR; 1 Ret	NÜR; 2 Ret	HUN; 1; 2	HUN; 2; 5	SIL; 1; 3	SIL; 2 DSQ	LEC; 1; 16	LEC; 2; 1	CAT; 1; 4	CAT; 2; 7	**3rd**	**156**
2012	Arden Caterham	ALC; 1 Ret	ALC; 2; 5	MON; 1; 3	SPA; 1; 11	SPA; 2 Ret	NÜR; 1; 18	NÜR; 2; 9	MSC; 1; 17†	MSC; 2; 5	SIL; 1 Ret	SIL; 2; 5	HUN; 1; 9	HUN; 2; 8	LEC; 1; 22	LEC; 2; 16	CAT; 1; 19	CAT; 2; 5	11th	63

^{†} Did not finish, but was classified as he had completed more than 90% of the race distance.

=== Complete GP2 Series results ===
(key) (Races in bold indicate pole position) (Races in italics indicate fastest lap)

Year	Entrant	1	2	3	4	5	6	7	8	9	10	11	12	13	14	15	16	17	18	19	20	21	22	D.C.	Points
2013	EQ8 Caterham Racing	SEP; FEA	SEP; SPR	BHR; FEA; 3	BHR; SPR; 20	CAT; FEA; 6	CAT; SPR; 6	MON; FEA; Ret	MON; SPR; 19	SIL; FEA; 10	SIL; SPR; 9	NÜR; FEA; 11	NÜR; SPR; 6	HUN; FEA; 13	HUN; SPR; 16	SPA; FEA; 3	SPA; SPR; 22	MNZ; FEA; 8	MNZ; SPR; 2	MRN; FEA; Ret	MRN; SPR; 23	**YMC**; **FEA**; 1	YMC; SPR; Ret	9th	92
2014	EQ8 Caterham Racing	BHR; FEA; 22	BHR; SPR; 25	CAT; FEA; Ret	CAT; SPR; 14	MON; FEA; 16	MON; SPR; 11	RBR; FEA; 8	RBR; SPR; 5	SIL; FEA; 12	SIL; SPR; 21													21st	12
2014	Campos Racing											HOC; FEA; Ret	HOC; SPR; 7	HUN; FEA	HUN; SPR	SPA; FEA	SPA; SPR	MNZ; FEA	MNZ; SPR	SOC; FEA	SOC; SPR	YMC; FEA	YMC; SPR	21st	12
2015	Racing Engineering	BHR; FEA; 3	BHR; SPR; 4	CAT; FEA; 3	CAT; SPR; 4	**MON**; **FEA**; 2	MON; SPR; 7	RBR; FEA; 6	RBR; SPR; 8	SIL; FEA; 2	SIL; SPR; 4	HUN; FEA; 12	HUN; SPR; 20	SPA; FEA; 6	SPA; SPR; 1	MNZ; FEA; 1	MNZ; SPR; Ret	SOC; FEA; 1	SOC; SPR; 6	BHR; FEA; 18	BHR; SPR; 9	YMC; FEA; 4	YMC; SPR; C	2nd	181.5

==== Complete GP2 Asia Series results ====
(key) (Races in bold indicate pole position) (Races in italics indicate fastest lap)

Year	Entrant	1	2	3	4	5	6	7	8	DC	Points
2009–10	Ocean Racing Technology	YMC1; FEA; 4	YMC1; SPR; 5							9th	12
2009–10	MalaysiaQi-Meritus.com			YMC2; FEA; 6	YMC2; SPR; 9	BHR1; FEA; Ret	BHR1; SPR; Ret	BHR2; FEA; 11	BHR2; SPR; 5	9th	12

==== Complete GP2 Final results ====
(key) (Races in bold indicate pole position) (Races in italics indicate fastest lap)

Year	Entrant	1	2	DC	Points
2011	Caterham Team AirAsia	YMC; FEA; 13	YMC; SPR; 7	10th	0

=== Complete Formula One results ===
(key) (Races in bold indicate pole position) (Races in italics indicates fastest lap)

Year	Entrant	Chassis	Engine	1	2	3	4	5	6	7	8	9	10	11	12	13	14	15	16	17	18	19	20	WDC	Points
2012	Caterham F1 Team	Caterham CT01	Renault RS27-2012 2.4 V8	AUS	MAL	CHN	BHR	ESP; TD	MON	CAN	EUR	GBR	GER	HUN	BEL	ITA	SIN	JPN	KOR	IND	ABU	USA	BRA	–	–
2013	Caterham F1 Team	Caterham CT03	Renault RS27-2013 2.4 V8	AUS	MAL	CHN	BHR	ESP	MON	CAN; TD	GBR	GER	HUN	BEL	ITA	SIN	JPN	KOR	IND	ABU	USA; TD	BRA		–	–
2014	Caterham F1 Team	Caterham CT05	Renault Energy F1-2014 1.6 V6 t	AUS	MAL	BHR	CHN	ESP	MON	CAN; TD	AUT	GBR	GER	HUN										–	0
2014	Marussia F1 Team	Marussia MR03	Ferrari 059/3 1.6 V6 t												BEL; PO	ITA	SIN	JPN	RUS; WD	USA	BRA	ABU		–	0
2015	Manor Marussia F1 Team	Marussia MR03B	Ferrari 059/3 1.6 V6 t	AUS	MAL	CHN	BHR	ESP	MON	CAN	AUT	GBR	HUN	BEL	ITA	SIN; 14	JPN; 18	RUS	USA; 12	MEX; 15	BRA; 18	ABU		20th	0

=== Complete FIA World Endurance Championship results ===
Year	Entrant	Class	Car	Engine	1	2	3	4	5	6	7	8	Rank	Points
2013	Greaves Motorsport	LMP2	Zytek Z11SN	Nissan VK45DE 4.5 L V8	SIL	SPA	LMS; 5	SÃO	COA	FUJ	SHA	BHR	19th	20

=== 24 Hours of Le Mans results ===
Year	Team	Co-Drivers	Car	Class	Laps	Pos.	Class Pos.
2013	(United Kingdom) Greaves Motorsport	(United Kingdom) Tom Kimber-Smith (United States) Eric Lux	Zytek Z11SN	LMP2	307	23rd	10th

=== Complete IMSA SportsCar Championship results ===
(key)

Year	Entrant	No.	Class	Make	Engine	1	2	3	4	5	6	7	8	9	10	11	Rank	Points	Ref
2014	DeltaWing Racing Cars	0	P	DeltaWing DWC13	Élan (Mazda) 1.9 L I4 Turbo	DAY; 16	SEB	LBH	LGA	DET	WGL	MOS	IMS	ELK	COA	PET	53rd	16	
2019	Acura Team Penske	7	DPi	Acura ARX-05	Acura AR35TT 3.5 L Turbo V6	DAY; 3	SEB; 4	LBH	MOH	DET	WGL	MOS	ELK	LGA	PET		23rd	58	
2020	Acura Team Penske	7	DPi	Acura ARX-05	Acura AR35TT 3.5 L Turbo V6	DAY; 8	DAY	SEB	ELK	ATL	MOH	PET; 2	LGA	SEB; 8			20th	78	
2021	Konica Minolta Acura	10	DPi	Acura ARX-05	Acura AR35TT 3.5 L Turbo V6	DAY; 1	SEB; 4	MOH	DET	WGL; 3	WGL	ELK	LGA	LBH	PET; 3		10th	1348	
2022	Konica Minolta Acura	10	DPi	Acura ARX-05	Acura AR35TT 3.5 L Turbo V6	**DAY**; 2	SEB	LBH	LGA	MOH	DET	WGL	MOS	ELK	PET		19th	355	
2024	Pfaff Motorsports	9	GTD Pro	McLaren 720S GT3 Evo	McLaren M840T 4.0 L Turbo V8	DAY; 10	SEB	LGA	DET	WGL	MOS	ELK	VIR	IMS	PET		40th	235	

==== 24 Hours of Daytona ====
24 Hours of Daytona results
Year	Class	No.	Team	Car	Co-drivers	Laps	Position	Class Pos.
2014	P	0	(United States) DeltaWing Racing Cars	DeltaWing DWC13	(United Kingdom) Katherine Legge (Colombia) Gabby Chaves (United Kingdom) Andy Meyrick	288	61 ^{DNF}	16 ^{DNF}
2019	DPi	7	(United States) Acura Team Penske	Acura ARX-05	(Brazil) Hélio Castroneves (United States) Ricky Taylor	593	3	3
2020	DPi	7	(United States) Acura Team Penske	Acura ARX-05	(Brazil) Hélio Castroneves (United States) Ricky Taylor	811	8	8
2021	DPi	10	(United States) Konica Minolta Acura	Acura ARX-05	(Portugal) Filipe Albuquerque (Brazil) Hélio Castroneves (United States) Ricky Taylor	807	1	1
2022	DPi	10	(United States) Konica Minolta Acura	Acura ARX-05	(Portugal) Filipe Albuquerque (United Kingdom) Will Stevens (United States) Ricky Taylor	761	2	2
2024	GTD; Pro	9	(Canada) Pfaff Motorsports	McLaren 720S GT3 Evo	(Canada) James Hinchcliffe (United Kingdom) Oliver Jarvis (Germany) Marvin Kirchhöfer	532	44 ^{DNF}	10 ^{DNF}

=== American open–wheel racing ===
==== IndyCar Series ====
(key)

Year	Team	No.	Chassis	Engine	1	2	3	4	5	6	7	8	9	10	11	12	13	14	15	16	17	18	Rank	Pts	Ref
2016	Andretti Herta Autosport w/ Curb-Agajanian	98	Dallara DW12	Honda	STP; 12	PHX; 14	LBH; 20	ALA; 15	IMS; 10	INDY; 1	DET; 10	DET; 12	ROA; 15	IOW; 6	TOR; 16	MOH; 14	POC; 20	TXS; 11	WGL; 8	SNM; 5			11th	430	
2017	Andretti Herta Autosport w/ Curb-Agajanian	98	Dallara DW12	Honda	STP; 11	LBH; 19	ALA; 5	PHX; 15	IMS; 8	INDY; 7	DET; 5	DET; 7	TXS; 22	ROA; 13	IOW; 11	TOR; 2	MOH; 6	POC; 3	GTW; 6	**WGL**; 1*	SNM; 21		7th	494	
2018	Andretti Autosport	27	Dallara DW12	Honda	STP; 3	PHX; 3	**LBH**; 1*	ALA; 11	IMS; 5	INDY; 4	DET; 3	**DET**; 12*	TXS; 3	ROA; 16	IOW; 9	TOR; 8	**MOH**; 1*	POC; 1*	GTW; 2	POR; 8	SNM; 7		2nd	621	
2019	Andretti Autosport	27	Dallara DW12	Honda	STP; 5	COA; 9	ALA; 5	**LBH**; 1*	IMS; 22	INDY; 2	**DET**; 2	DET; 5	TXS; 2	ROA; 1*	TOR; 3	IOW; 6	MOH; 5	POC; 18	GTW; 13	POR; 3	LAG; 6		3rd	608	
2020	Andretti Autosport	27	Dallara DW12	Honda	TXS; 15	IMS; 25	ROA; 19	ROA; 3	IOW; 6	IOW; 8	INDY; 27	GTW; 22	GTW; 14	MOH; 3	MOH; 2	IMS; 2	IMS; 3	STP; 21					9th	317	
2021	Andretti Autosport	27	Dallara DW12	Honda	ALA; 9	STP; 21	TXS; 8	TXS; 20	IMS; 7	INDY; 29	DET; 7	DET; 13	ROA; 7	MOH; 5	NSH; 17	IMS; 4	GTW; 17	POR; 2	LAG; 25	LBH; 6			10th	332	
2022	Andretti Autosport	27	Dallara DW12	Honda	STP; 20	TXS; 27	LBH; 8	ALA; 9	IMS; 11	INDY; 5	DET; 2	**ROA**; 3	MOH; 19	TOR; 23	IOW; 13	IOW; 18	IMS; 1*	NSH; 4	GTW; 25	POR; 7	LAG; 10		9th	381	
2023	Arrow McLaren	7	Dallara DW12	Chevrolet	STP; 4	TXS; 22	LBH; 22	ALA; 8	IMS; 3	INDY; 5	DET; 5	ROA; 10	MOH; 10	TOR; 16	IOW; 10	IOW; 15	NSH; 19	IMS; 5	GTW; 4	POR; 20	LAG; 7		9th	375	
2024	Arrow McLaren	7	Dallara DW12	Chevrolet	STP; 6	THE; 7	LBH; 10	ALA; 25	IMS; 8	INDY; 4	DET; 5	ROA; 18	LAG; 3	MOH; 6	IOW; 8	IOW; 15	TOR; Wth	GTW; 19	POR; 12	MIL; 7	MIL; 6	NSH; 15	10th	366	
2025	Ed Carpenter Racing	20	Dallara DW12	Chevrolet	STP; 10	THE; 9	LBH; 15	ALA; 8	IMS; 14	INDY; 28	DET; 10	GTW; 11	ROA; 13	MOH; 15	IOW; 25	IOW; 17	TOR; 25	LAG; 15	POR; 5	MIL; 4	NSH; 10		15th	297	
2026	Ed Carpenter Racing	20	Dallara DW12	Chevrolet	STP; 16	PHX; 6	ARL; 9	ALA; 11	LBH; 9	IMS; 25	INDY; 30	DET; 17	GTW; 18	ROA; 6	MOH; 20	NSH; 23	POR; 19	MRK; 20	WSH; 12	MIL; 14	MIL; 11	LAG; 3	15th	307	

^{*} Season still in progress.

==== Indianapolis 500 ====
Year	Chassis	Engine	Start	Finish	Team
2016	Dallara	Honda	11	**1**	Andretti Herta Autosport with Curb-Agajanian
2017	Dallara	Honda	3	7	Andretti Herta Autosport with Curb-Agajanian
2018	Dallara	Honda	32	4	Andretti Autosport
2019	Dallara	Honda	9	2	Andretti Autosport
2020	Dallara	Honda	9	27	Andretti Autosport
2021	Dallara	Honda	10	29	Andretti Autosport
2022	Dallara	Honda	20	5	Andretti Autosport
2023	Dallara	Chevrolet	7	5	Arrow McLaren
2024	Dallara	Chevrolet	4	4	Arrow McLaren
2025	Dallara	Chevrolet	12	28	Ed Carpenter Racing
2026	Dallara	Chevrolet	2	30	Ed Carpenter Racing

=== Complete Bathurst 1000 results ===
Year	Team	Car	Co-driver	Position	Laps
2019	Walkinshaw Andretti United	Holden Commodore ZB	(Canada) James Hinchcliffe	18th	159

== Notes ==
Sporting positions
Preceded by Tim Traver	Skip Barber Western Regional; Champion; 2006	Succeeded by Tom Roberts
Preceded by Daniel Morad (Formula BMW Americas)	Formula BMW Americas; Champion; 2008	Succeeded by Gabby Chaves
Preceded by Philipp Eng	Formula BMW World Final; Winner; 2008	Succeeded by None (Race not held since)
Preceded by Juan Pablo Montoya	Indianapolis 500; Winner; 2016	Succeeded by Takuma Sato
Preceded by Gabby Chaves	Indianapolis 500 Rookie of the Year; 2016	Succeeded by Fernando Alonso
Preceded by Gabby Chaves	IndyCar Series; Rookie of the Year; 2016	Succeeded by Ed Jones
Preceded by Ryan Briscoe; Renger van der Zande	Michelin Endurance Cup; Champion; 2021; With: Filipe Albuquerque & Ricky Taylor	Succeeded by Tom Blomqvist; Oliver Jarvis
