= 2017 Firestone Grand Prix of St. Petersburg =

(United States) 2017 St. Petersburg
Race details
1st round of the 2017 IndyCar Series season
Next race →
- Date: March 12, 2017
- Official name: Firestone Grand Prix of St. Petersburg
- Location: Streets of St. Petersburg
- Course: Temporary street circuit 1.800 mi / 2.897 km
- Distance: 110 laps 198.000 mi / 318.670 km

Pole position
- Driver: (Australia) Will Power (Team Penske)
- Time: 1:01.0640

Fastest lap
- Driver: (New Zealand) Scott Dixon (Chip Ganassi Racing)
- Time: 1:02.0786 (on lap 82 of 110)

Podium
- First: (France) Sébastien Bourdais (Dale Coyne Racing)
- Second: (France) Simon Pagenaud (Team Penske)
- Third: (New Zealand) Scott Dixon (Chip Ganassi Racing)

Chronology
Previous	Next
2016	2018

The 2017 Firestone Grand Prix of St. Petersburg was the first round of the 2017 IndyCar Series. The race was held on March 12, 2017, in St. Petersburg, Florida, on the city's temporary street circuit. The race was won by Sébastien Bourdais, coming from last place on the grid.

== Background ==
Prior to the 2017 running of the event, many of the streets used for the circuit were repaved. However, a series of bumps caused by the repaving in the turn 3 area caused several cars in support races to lose control. As a result, the turn was reconfigured, with the outside wall moved back 40 feet and curbing added to the inside of the corner, making the turn sharper and slower.

== Report ==
=== Qualifying ===
Qualifying for the event took place on Saturday, March 11. Will Power grabbed pole position, marking the seventh time that the Australian had qualified first at St. Petersburg. His time of 1:01.0640 (at an average of 106.12 mph (170.12 km/h)) stood nearly two-tenths faster than second place qualifier Scott Dixon's and confirming St. Petersburg's status as the slowest track on the calendar. Rounding out the top six were James Hinchcliffe, Josef Newgarden, Takuma Sato, and Tony Kanaan. Defending champion Simon Pagenaud struggled during qualifications, relegating him to a 14th place start. Sébastien Bourdais brought out the lone red flag of qualifying after crashing into the outside barriers in turn 13 during his out lap. Under new IndyCar regulations, Bourdais was parked for the remainer of the session for bringing out the red flag. Having not completed a lap, Bourdais was relegated to starting 21st and last.

=== Race ===
The race was held on Sunday, March 12. The beginning of the race saw Will Power protect his first place start, while James Hinchcliffe managed to pass Scott Dixon for second place. While the entire field made it through the first turn cleanly, the second and third turns caused issues. Coming through turn 2, Graham Rahal and Charlie Kimball made contact, sending Rahal into a spin and sending Kimball toward the outside wall in turn 3, where he collected Carlos Muñoz. Hélio Castroneves, Ed Jones, and Mikhail Aleshin also suffered damage in the incident. The incident brought out the first full-course caution of the event.

On the restart on lap 5, Hinchcliffe immediately moved into the lead with a move around the outside of turn 1 and began to pull away, extending his lead to over four seconds by lap 12. On lap 14, Power suddenly dived into the pits with a puncture, sending him to the back of the field. Leaving the pits, Power ran over an air hose, which incurred a drive-through penalty and put him even further behind the leader. Scott Dixon moved into second place after Power's emergency pit stop.

On lap 20, the first round of green flag pit stops began, with several drivers further down the order, including Sébastien Bourdais and Simon Pagenaud, being some of the first in. However, the race's second full-course caution came out in the middle of this pit sequence on lap 26, when Tony Kanaan and Mikhail Aleshin made contact in turn 4, littering the track with debris. The caution forced the top seven drivers in the race to pit during the caution and lose large amounts of track positions. In the pit lane, Spencer Pigot, who had been running fifth prior to the pit stop, suffered a failure and subsequent explosion of the left-rear brake on his car, eventually forcing him out of the race. Following the pit stops for the leaders, Pagenaud was the leader of the race, with Bourdais and Marco Andretti in second and third.

Racing resumed on lap 30 with no major action up front. Further back, Scott Dixon briefly lost acceleration on his car, sending him well down the order. In turn 2, Conor Daly and Ryan Hunter-Reay made contact, but both were able to avoid significant damage. On lap 37, the lead of the race changed hands again when Sébastien Bourdais was able to pass Simon Pagenaud in turn 1. Bourdais quickly began to pull away.

The second round of green flag pit stops began on lap 50, this time with no interruption from a caution period. After the cycle was complete, Bourdais and Pagenaud remained first and second, while Will Power moved up to third, though Power's early pit stops meant that he was off-sequence from the rest of the leaders. Up front, Bourdais began to expand his lead even farther than on the previous stint, as his team had no concerns about saving fuel that others had. Farther back in the field, Scott Dixon had begun to move back up through the field after his earlier woes, slotting into seventh place by lap 75.

The final round of green flag pit stops began on lap 77, when the off-sequence Power brought his car in. Alexander Rossi also pitted due to a leak in one of his tires. Once again, Bourdais emerged in front of Pagenaud and Power as the race leader. During this sequence, Takuma Sato suffered from a delayed pit stop after a wheel-gun jammed, causing the Japanese driver to lose a few positions. Dixon continued his climb back through the field, emerging from the sequence with fourth place. Shortly after the end of the pit-stops, Power slowed severely on track with an issue with the fuel-feed. Despite efforts to get the issue fixed without bringing the car into the pits, Power was black flagged for running too slowly and eventually retired from the race due to a mechanical issue.

Up front, the last laps proved no issue for Bourdais, who had, by the end of the race, pulled out over 10 seconds on second place Pagenaud. Third place went to Dixon, who was able to recover from his early race issues, but was also puzzled by the caution that came out after Kanaan and Aleshin made contact. Rounding out the top five were Andretti Autosport teammates Hunter-Reay and Sato, both of whom had dealt with crashes during the practices leading up to the race.

Bourdais' victory came after starting in last place and in his first race driving for Dale Coyne Racing since 2011. The win marked his 36th in American Open-Wheel Racing, breaking a tie between himself and Bobby Unser for sixth on the all-time wins list. For Bourdais, it was his first win since Detroit during the previous season. For Dale Coyne Racing, the win was the team's first since 2014, when Carlos Huertas took victory at the Houston street circuit.

== Results ==
Key	Meaning
R	Rookie
W	Past winner

=== Qualifying ===
Pos	No.	Name	Grp.	Round 1	Round 2	Firestone Fast 6
1	12	(Australia) Will Power W	1	1:01.0506	1:01.3176	1:01.0640
2	9	(New Zealand) Scott Dixon	2	1:00.9602	1:00.9293	1:01.2219
3	5	(Canada) James Hinchcliffe W	1	1:01.2237	1:01.1891	1:01.3039
4	2	(United States) Josef Newgarden	2	1:01.1110	1:01.1915	1:01.7229
5	26	(Japan) Takuma Sato	2	1:01.3775	1:01.2691	1:01.9851
6	10	(Brazil) Tony Kanaan	2	1:01.5067	1:01.3211	1:02.0824
7	8	(United Kingdom) Max Chilton	1	1:01.3032	1:01.3516	
8	98	(United States) Alexander Rossi	2	1:01.5347	1:01.5198	
9	83	(United States) Charlie Kimball	1	1:01.1823	1:01.6066	
10	15	(United States) Graham Rahal W	2	1:01.5874	1:01.6181	
11	14	(Colombia) Carlos Muñoz	1	1:01.5238	1:01.7399	
12	28	(United States) Ryan Hunter-Reay	1	1:01.5416	1:03.1588	
13	20	(United States) Spencer Pigot	1	1:01.5898		
14	1	(France) Simon Pagenaud	2	1:01.6129		
15	27	(United States) Marco Andretti	1	1:01.6070		
16	3	(Brazil) Hélio Castroneves W	2	1:01.7159		
17	7	(Russia) Mikhail Aleshin	1	1:01.7674		
18	19	(United Arab Emirates) Ed Jones R	2	1:01.7598		
19	21	(United States) J. R. Hildebrand	1	1:01.8465		
20	4	(United States) Conor Daly	2	1:02.2030		
21	18	(France) Sébastien Bourdais	2	No Time		
OFFICIAL BOX SCORE

Source for individual rounds:

=== Race ===
Pos	No.	Driver	Team	Engine	Laps	Time/Retired	Pit Stops	Grid	Laps Led	Pts.^{1}
1	18	(France) Sébastien Bourdais	Dale Coyne Racing	Honda	110	2:04:32.4153	3	21	69	53
2	1	(France) Simon Pagenaud	Team Penske	Chevrolet	110	+10.3508	3	14	13	41
3	9	(New Zealand) Scott Dixon	Chip Ganassi Racing	Honda	110	+27.4985	3	2		35
4	28	(United States) Ryan Hunter-Reay	Andretti Autosport	Honda	110	+36.1147	5	12		32
5	26	(Japan) Takuma Sato	Andretti Autosport	Honda	110	+36.1675	3	5	2	31
6	3	(Brazil) Hélio Castroneves W	Team Penske	Chevrolet	110	+42.0285	4	16		28
7	27	(United States) Marco Andretti	Andretti Autosport	Honda	110	+49.5217	3	15		26
8	2	(United States) Josef Newgarden	Team Penske	Chevrolet	110	+50.0443	3	4		24
9	5	(Canada) James Hinchcliffe W	Schmidt Peterson Motorsports	Honda	110	+58.8628	3	3	21	23
10	19	(United Arab Emirates) Ed Jones R	Dale Coyne Racing	Honda	110	+1:01.8611	4	18		20
11	98	(United States) Alexander Rossi	Andretti Herta Autosport	Honda	109	+1 Lap	3	8		19
12	10	(Brazil) Tony Kanaan	Chip Ganassi Racing	Honda	109	+1 Lap	5	6		18
13	21	(United States) J. R. Hildebrand	Ed Carpenter Racing	Chevrolet	109	+1 Lap	5	19		17
14	7	(Russia) Mikhail Aleshin	Schmidt Peterson Motorsports	Honda	109	+1 Lap	5	17		16
15	4	(United States) Conor Daly	A. J. Foyt Enterprises	Chevrolet	109	+1 Lap	3	20		15
16	8	(United Kingdom) Max Chilton	Chip Ganassi Racing	Honda	109	+1 Lap	4	7		14
17	15	(United States) Graham Rahal W	Rahal Letterman Lanigan Racing	Honda	108	+2 Laps	6	10		13
18	83	(United States) Charlie Kimball	Chip Ganassi Racing	Honda	105	+5 Laps	4	9		12
19	12	(Australia) Will Power W	Team Penske	Chevrolet	99	Black flagged	7	1	5	13
20	20	(United States) Spencer Pigot	Ed Carpenter Racing	Chevrolet	71	Mechanical	4	13		10
21	14	(Colombia) Carlos Muñoz	A. J. Foyt Enterprises	Chevrolet	32	Mechanical	3	11		9
OFFICIAL BOX SCORE

Notes: ^{1} Points include 1 point for leading at least 1 lap during a race, an additional 2 points for leading the most race laps, and 1 point for Pole Position.

Source for time gaps:

== Championship standings after the race ==
Drivers' Championship standings

Pos	Driver	Points
1	(France) Sébastien Bourdais	53
2	(France) Simon Pagenaud	41
3	(New Zealand) Scott Dixon	35
4	(United States) Ryan Hunter-Reay	32
5	(Japan) Takuma Sato	31

Manufacturer standings

Pos	Manufacturer	Points
1	(Japan) Honda	90
2	(United States) Chevrolet	69

- Note: Only the top five positions are included.

Previous race: None	IndyCar Series; 2017 season	Next race: 2017 Toyota Grand Prix of Long Beach
Previous race: 2016 Firestone Grand Prix of St. Petersburg	Firestone Grand Prix of St. Petersburg	Next race: 2018 Firestone Grand Prix of St. Petersburg
