= 2017 Toyota Grand Prix of Long Beach =

IndyCar Series auto race

(United States) 2017 Toyota Grand Prix of Long Beach
Race details
2nd round of the 2017 IndyCar Series season
← Previous race	Next race →
- Date: April 9, 2017
- Official name: Toyota Grand Prix of Long Beach
- Location: Streets of Long Beach
- Course: Temporary street circuit 1.968 mi / 3.167 km
- Distance: 85 laps 167.28 mi / 269.21 km

Pole position
- Driver: (Brazil) Hélio Castroneves (Team Penske)
- Time: 1:06.2254

Fastest lap
- Driver: (Brazil) Hélio Castroneves (Team Penske)
- Time: 1:07.7696 (on lap 59 of 85)

Podium
- First: (Canada) James Hinchcliffe (Schmidt Peterson Motorsports)
- Second: (France) Sébastien Bourdais (Dale Coyne Racing)
- Third: (United States) Josef Newgarden (Team Penske)

Chronology
Previous	Next
2016	2018

The 2017 Toyota Grand Prix of Long Beach was the second round of the 2017 IndyCar Series and the 43rd annual running of the Toyota Grand Prix of Long Beach. The race was contested over 85 laps on a temporary street circuit in Long Beach, California on April 9, 2017. Hélio Castroneves won the pole, while James Hinchcliffe won the race.

== Report ==
=== Qualifying ===
Qualifying was held on Saturday, April 8, 2017. For the third consecutive year, Hélio Castroneves qualified on pole for the event, setting a new track record in the process with a lap of 1:06.2254, at an average speed of 106.98 mph (172.17 km/h). Scott Dixon qualified in second, while Ryan Hunter-Reay qualified third. Finishing the Fast Six were James Hinchcliffe, Alexander Rossi, and Graham Rahal. Defending race winner Simon Pagenaud was penalized for interfering with one of his teammate Castroneves' laps and was stripped of his two fastest laps in the session, relegating him to last place on the grid.

=== Race ===
The race was held on Sunday, April 9. At the start of the race, pole sitter Hélio Castroneves timed the start poorly and immediately dropped five positions. Scott Dixon led the race into turn one, with James Hinchcliffe and Ryan Hunter-Reay behind. As the field worked the first turns of the race, Charlie Kimball and Will Power came together in turn four, sending both cars into the wall and bringing out the race's first caution period. Kimball was forced to retire from the race from the damage, while Power was able to continue on after a front wing change.

When racing resumed, Dixon continued to hold the lead, while Hunter-Reay managed to slip past Hinchcliffe for second position. By lap 10, pit stops began to occur amongst drivers further back, including Mikhail Aleshin, Tony Kanaan, and the Andretti Autosport teammates Takuma Sato and Marco Andretti. Shortly after the stops, however, Andretti began to slow and eventually pulled off course and retired from the race. Race leader Dixon would make his pit stop shortly after this on lap 16, handing the lead to Hunter-Reay. The remaining front runners, committed to a two-stop strategy, remained on course longer, with Hinchcliffe and Alexander Rossi being the first to peel off on lap 28. By the time the pit sequence ended on lap 31, Dixon regained the lead, with Hunter-Reay following in second.

Dixon, on his three-stop strategy, pitted again on lap 41, once again handing the lead to Hunter-Reay. Dixon was able to make significant ground on the leaders on his new tires and, as they came into the pits around lap 55, he resumed the lead with ease. After the cycle, Hinchcliffe managed to get ahead of Hunter-Reay. However, up front, a battle for the lead began brewing as Josef Newgarden managed to move into second place and put pressure on Dixon. On lap 60, however, he and his teammate Castroneves pitted, with Dixon following them in a lap latter, elevating Hinchcliffe to the race lead. During the sequence, Newgarden managed to get around Dixon. On lap 64, the complexion of the race suddenly changed, as Rossi suddenly ground to a halt on course, bringing out the race's second caution period with 21 laps remaining.

At the restart, the running order was Hinchcliffe, Hunter-Reay, Sébastien Bourdais, Newgarden, and Dixon. Hinchcliffe was able to manage to pull out a lead on Hunter-Reay, but shortly thereafter, Hunter-Reay began to pull him back. Further back, a clash between Mikhail Aleshin and Tony Kanaan resulted in a puncture for Kanaan, dropping him down the order. Also in this time frame, Takuma Sato suddenly slowed on course and brought his car to a halt on an access lane.

With five laps to go, second place Hunter-Reay suddenly slowed and stopped on course, bringing out the race's third and final caution period. Hunter-Reay's retirement meant that all four Andretti Autosport cars would fail to reach the end due to mechanical or electrical issues. Sébastien Bourdais, running a quiet but steady race, suddenly moved into second, while Newgarden was boosted into third. On the restart Hinchcliffe was able to pull out a sizable lead on the front straight, securing his position for the short run to the end, and crossed the line 1.5 seconds ahead of Bourdais to take his first victory since the 2015 season and his first since his near fatal crash during practice for the 2015 Indianapolis 500. Third place went to Newgarden, fourth to Dixon, and fifth Simon Pagenaud, who quietly moved his way up from the rear of the field to take a respectable finish. Rookie Ed Jones finished in sixth. As a result of the finish, Bourdais was able to extend his points lead in the championship, while Hinchcliffe moved into second place.

Following a last lap incident with Mikhail Aleshin, J. R. Hildebrand was found to have broken a bone in his left hand. He was not cleared to resume driving for the following race at Barber Motorsports Park.

== Results ==
Key	Meaning
R	Rookie
W	Past winner

=== Qualifying ===
Pos	No.	Name	Grp.	Round 1	Round 2	Firestone Fast 6
1	3	(Brazil) Hélio Castroneves W	2	1:07.1407	1:06.4792	1:06.2254
2	9	(New Zealand) Scott Dixon W	2	1:06.8297	1:06.2285	1:06.4123
3	28	(United States) Ryan Hunter-Reay W	1	1:07.0176	1:06.5320	1:06.4401
4	5	(Canada) James Hinchcliffe	1	1:07.3209	1:06.4297	1:06.5291
5	98	(United States) Alexander Rossi	1	1:07.0961	1:06.2288	1:06.5595
6	15	(United States) Graham Rahal	1	1:07.2517	1:06.4109	1:06.7562
7	83	(United States) Charlie Kimball	1	1:07.4149	1:06.5404	
8	2	(United States) Josef Newgarden	1	1:07.0619	1:06.6074	
9	12	(Australia) Will Power W	2	1:06.7340	1:06.6145	
10	27	(United States) Marco Andretti	2	1:07.3054	1:06.6222	
11	10	(Brazil) Tony Kanaan	2	1:07.0470	1:06.6262	
12	18	(France) Sébastien Bourdais W	2	1:07.0569	1:06.7853	
13	19	(United Arab Emirates) Ed Jones R	1	1:07.5832		
14	14	(Colombia) Carlos Muñoz	2	1:07.3738		
15	21	(United States) J. R. Hildebrand	1	1:07.6931		
16	7	(Russia) Mikhail Aleshin	2	1:07.3893		
17	4	(United States) Conor Daly	1	1:07.7977		
18	26	(Japan) Takuma Sato W	2	1:07.4699		
19	20	(United States) Spencer Pigot	1	1:07.8442		
20	8	(United Kingdom) Max Chilton	2	1:07.5333		
21	1	(France) Simon Pagenaud W	2	1:08.0439		
OFFICIAL BOX SCORE

Source for individual rounds:

=== Race ===
Pos	No.	Driver	Team	Engine	Laps	Time/Retired	Pit Stops	Grid	Laps Led	Pts.^{1}
1	5	(Canada) James Hinchcliffe	Schmidt Peterson Motorsports	Honda	85	1:50:28.9818	2	4	25	51
2	18	(France) Sébastien Bourdais W	Dale Coyne Racing	Honda	85	+1.4940	3	12		40
3	2	(United States) Josef Newgarden	Team Penske	Chevrolet	85	+2.3160	3	8		35
4	9	(New Zealand) Scott Dixon W	Chip Ganassi Racing	Honda	85	+2.7832	3	2	32	35
5	1	(France) Simon Pagenaud W	Team Penske	Chevrolet	85	+3.3934	3	21		30
6	19	(United Arab Emirates) Ed Jones R	Dale Coyne Racing	Honda	85	+5.7951	3	13		28
7	14	(Colombia) Carlos Muñoz	A. J. Foyt Enterprises	Chevrolet	85	+6.9393	3	14		26
8	20	(United States) Spencer Pigot	Ed Carpenter Racing	Chevrolet	85	+9.0570	3	19		24
9	3	(Brazil) Hélio Castroneves W	Team Penske	Chevrolet	85	+9.3403	4	1		23
10	15	(United States) Graham Rahal	Rahal Letterman Lanigan Racing	Honda	85	+17.8632	3	6		20
11	21	(United States) J. R. Hildebrand	Ed Carpenter Racing	Chevrolet	84	Contact	3	15		19
12	7	(Russia) Mikhail Aleshin	Schmidt Peterson Motorsports	Honda	84	+1 Lap	3	16		18
13	12	(Australia) Will Power W	Team Penske	Chevrolet	84	+1 Lap	5	9		17
14	8	(United Kingdom) Max Chilton	Chip Ganassi Racing	Honda	84	+1 Lap	4	20		16
15	10	(Brazil) Tony Kanaan	Chip Ganassi Racing	Honda	84	+1 Lap	6	11		15
16	4	(United States) Conor Daly	A. J. Foyt Enterprises	Chevrolet	84	+1 Lap	6	17		14
17	28	(United States) Ryan Hunter-Reay W	Andretti Autosport	Honda	79	Off Course	2	3	28	14
18	26	(Japan) Takuma Sato W	Andretti Autosport	Honda	78	Off Course	4	18		12
19	98	(United States) Alexander Rossi	Andretti Herta Autosport	Honda	62	Mechanical	2	5		11
20	27	(United States) Marco Andretti	Andretti Autosport	Honda	14	Off Course	1	10		10
21	83	(United States) Charlie Kimball	Chip Ganassi Racing	Honda	1	Contact	1	7		9
OFFICIAL BOX SCORE

Notes: ^{1} Points include 1 point for leading at least 1 lap during a race, an additional 2 points for leading the most race laps, and 1 point for Pole Position.

Source for time gaps:

== Championship standings after the race ==
Drivers' Championship standings

	Pos	Driver	Points
	1	(France) Sébastien Bourdais	93
7	2	(Canada) James Hinchcliffe	74
1	3	(France) Simon Pagenaud	71
1	4	(New Zealand) Scott Dixon	70
3	5	(United States) Josef Newgarden	59

Manufacturer standings

Pos	Manufacturer	Points
1	(Japan) Honda	185
2	(United States) Chevrolet	135

- Note: Only the top five positions are included.

Previous race: 2017 Firestone Grand Prix of St. Petersburg	IndyCar Series; 2017 season	Next race: 2017 Honda Indy Grand Prix of Alabama
Previous race: 2016 Toyota Grand Prix of Long Beach	Toyota Grand Prix of Long Beach	Next race: 2018 Toyota Grand Prix of Long Beach
