= Pirtek Team Murray =

Racing team

(Australia) Team Murray
- Founded: 2016
- Team principal(s): Brett Murray
- Current series: IndyCar Series
- Current drivers: (Australia) 61. Matthew Brabham (Indy 500)
- Website: http://teammurray.com.au/

Team Murray (known as Pirtek Team Murray) is an Australian racing team that competed in the 100th running of the Indianapolis 500. The team ran the full month of May 100th Anniversary celebrations, including the Verizon IndyCar Series Angie's List Grand Prix of Indianapolis.

== History ==
Team Murray is an American-Australian collaboration. Team owner, Brett "Crusher" Murray is an Australian motorsport public relations specialist based on the Gold Coast, Queensland who has extensive experience in the American open-wheel racing market. Team Murray was operated by KV Racing Technology – a team based in Indiana owned by Australian, Kevin Kalkhoven, 1996 IndyCar World Champion, Jimmy Vasser, and James "Sulli" Sullivan. It operated a one-car operation for Sébastien Bourdais and won the 2013 Indianapolis 500 with Tony Kanaan.

For the 2016 Indianapolis 500, the car was driven by Matthew Brabham, who made history when he placed the Brabham name alongside that of Vukovich and Andretti as the only families to have had three generations start the Indy 500. Matthew's grandfather, Jack Brabham started the 500 on four occasions and his father, Geoff – who finished a best placing of fourth in his 10 attempts. For the 500, the major sponsor for the team was Pirtek.

=== Complete IndyCar Series results ===
(key)

Year	Chassis	Engine	Drivers	No.	1	2	3	4	5	6	7	8	9	10	11	12	13	14	15	16
2016					STP	PHX	LBH	ALA	IMS	INDY	DET		ROA	IOW	TOR	MDO	POC	TXS	WGL	SNM
2016	Dallara DW12	Chevrolet IndyCar V6t	(Australia) Matthew Brabham	61					16	22										
