= Pirtek =

Hydraulic and industrial hose service

- Founded: 1980
- Founder: Peter Duncan
- Headquarters: Sydney
- Key people: Stephen Dutton (CEO)
- Products: Hydraulic Hose
- Owner: Duncan family
- Website: www.pirtek.com

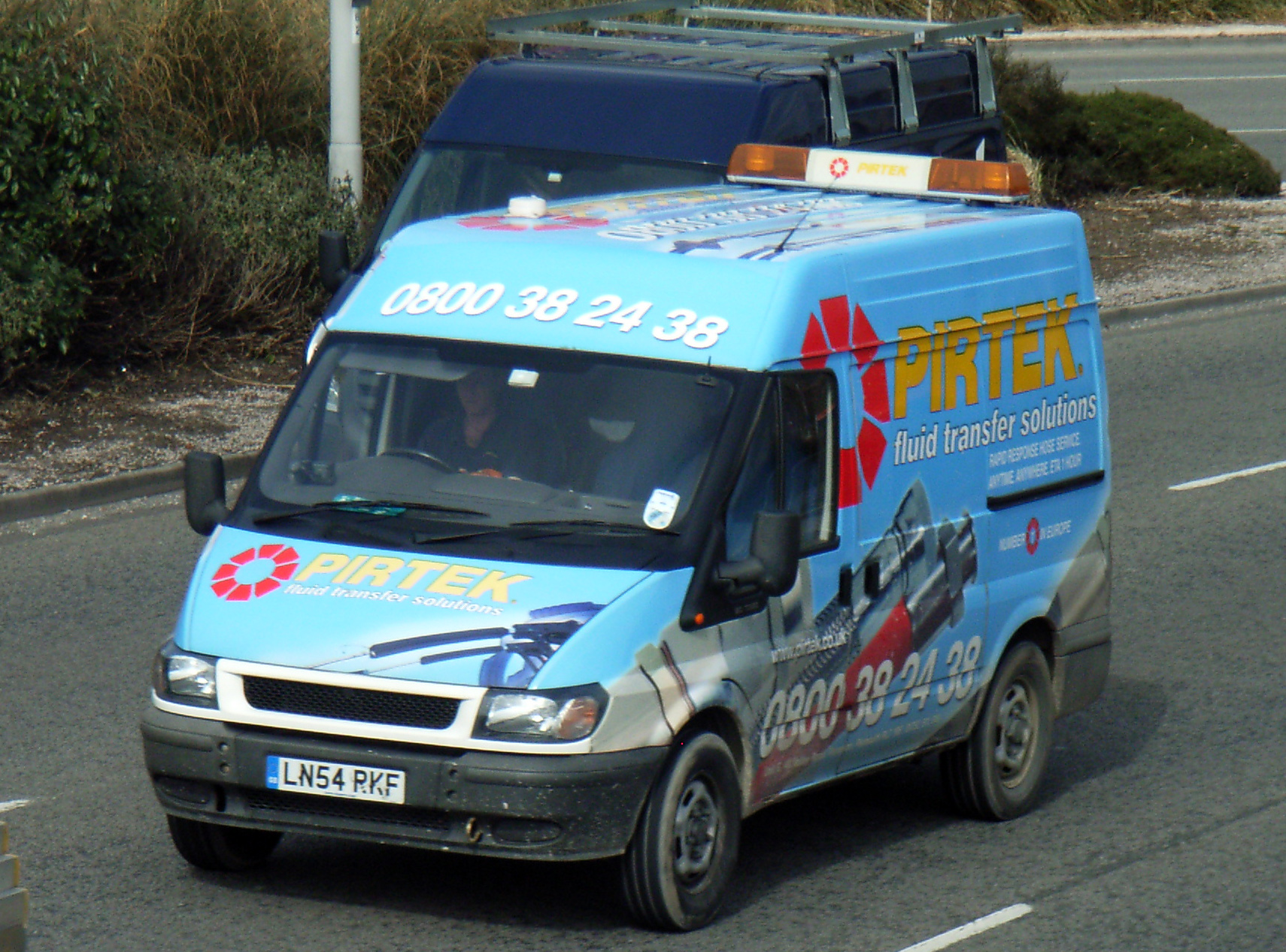
Pirtek Ford Transit in Plymouth, England, in March 2009

Pirtek is a global brand specialising in Hydraulic & Industrial hose. It was founded in Australia in 1980 by Peter Duncan, expanding into the United Kingdom in 1988 and the United States in 1996. It operates its business using a franchise model.

== History ==
Pirtek was founded in Australia in 1980 by Peter Duncan and Wally Davey. The name is a derivation of Pirelli Technology–Pirelli being one of their major suppliers. The company initially began as a grouping of distributors before branching out into franchising in 1985.

The company expanded as a franchise to the United Kingdom in 1988 as Pirtek Europe. The European operation was originally a partnership between the original founders and British businessmen Forbes Petrie and Peter Brennan. Pirtek Europe was bought out by Vision Capital in 2007, then to Halifax Group in 2015.

In the late 1990s, the parent company, Pirtek Fluid Transfer Solutions sold off 80 percent of the United States franchise business, ultimately buying back the share in 2015.

== Sports sponsorships ==
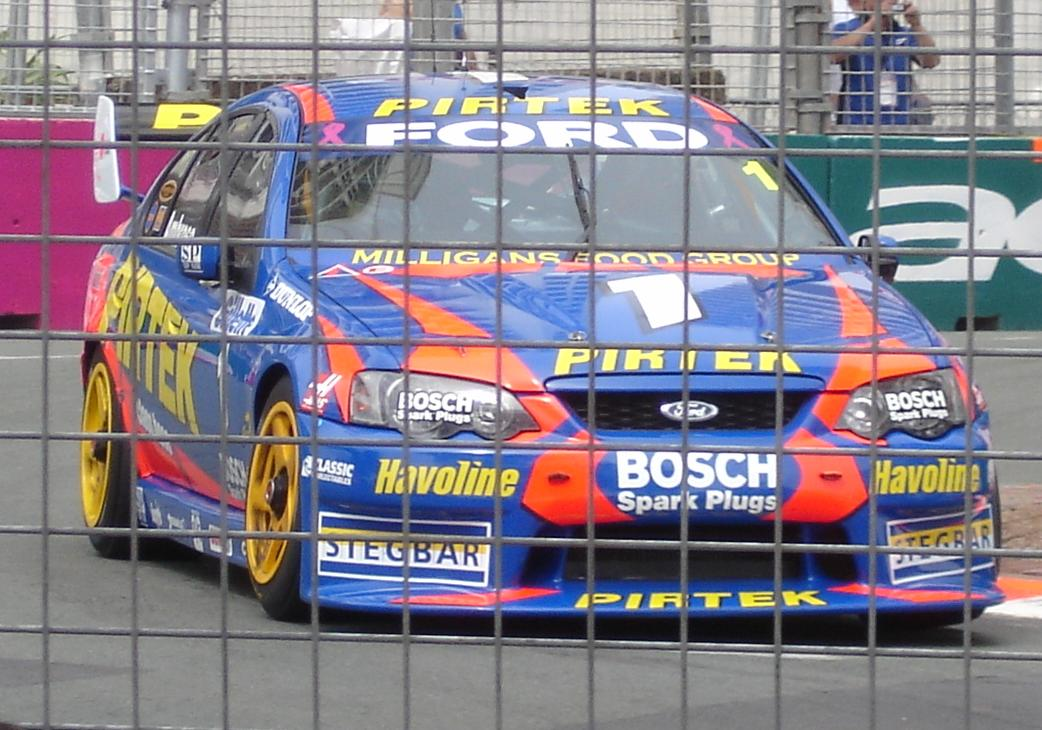
Stone Brothers Racing Ford Falcon BA on the Surfers Paradise Street Circuit in October 2005

Pirtek became involved in sporting sponsorship during the late 1990s, sponsoring Stone Brothers Racing. The company has supported motor sports outfits in various countries, as well as becoming involved in rugby league.

=== Motor racing ===
==== Australia ====
- Stone Brothers Racing naming rights sponsor from 1998 until 2005 with Jason Bright, Craig Baird and Marcos Ambrose
- Britek Motorsport Australian Rally Championship naming rights sponsor in 2007 with Michael Guest and Darren Windus
- Enduro Cup naming rights sponsor since 2013
- DJR Team Penske naming rights sponsor at the 2016 WD-40 Phillip Island SuperSprint
- Perth SuperNight event sponsor from 2019

==== United Kingdom ====
- naming rights sponsor for Andrew Jordan's British Touring Car Championship campaigns with Eurotech Racing (2010-2014), Triple Eight Racing (2015), Motorbase Performance (2016) and West Surrey Racing (2017–2019)

==== United States ====
- Team Murray that competed at the 2016 Indianapolis 500 with Matthew Brabham
- Brad Keselowski Racing naming rights sponsor in 2017 NASCAR Camping World Truck Series with Austin Cindric and 2018 NASCAR Xfinity Series livery with Team Penske

=== Rugby league ===
- Parramatta Eels naming rights sponsor from 2004 until 2013
- New Zealand Kiwis main sponsor since 2008

=== Sports grounds ===
- naming rights sponsor at Parramatta Stadium from 2014 until 2016
