= 2016 Grand Prix of Indianapolis =

(United States) 2016 GP Indianapolis
Race details
5th round of the 2016 IndyCar Series season
← Previous race	Next race →
- Date: May 14, 2016
- Official name: Angie's List Grand Prix of Indianapolis
- Location: Indianapolis Motor Speedway
- Course: Permanent racing facility 2.439 mi / 3.925 km
- Distance: 82 laps 200 mi / 321.87 km

Pole position
- Driver: (France) Simon Pagenaud (Team Penske)
- Time: 1:08.6868

Fastest lap
- Driver: (United States) Alexander Rossi (Andretti Autosport)
- Time: 1:09.5535 (on lap 67 of 82)

Podium
- First: (France) Simon Pagenaud (Team Penske)
- Second: (Brazil) Hélio Castroneves (Team Penske)
- Third: (Canada) James Hinchcliffe (Schmidt Peterson Motorsports)

The 2016 Grand Prix of Indianapolis, officially known as the 2016 Angie's List Grand Prix of Indianapolis for sponsorship reasons, was the fifth round of the 2016 IndyCar Series season. The race took place over 82 laps on the infield road course at Indianapolis Motor Speedway in Speedway, Indiana. The race also served as part of the festivities surrounding the 2016 Indianapolis 500. The car count for the race slightly increased from other races during the season due to some entries participating in the Indianapolis 500 electing to also run in the Grand Prix.

== Race Recap ==
Logo of 2016 Grand Prix of Indianapolis

For the second race in a row, Simon Pagenaud qualified in pole position, this time with a time of 1:08.6868. Chip Ganassi Racing driver Charlie Kimball surprised with a qualifying run good enough to place him second. Graham Rahal and Josef Newgarden, who had qualified third and fifth respectively, had their times disallowed and were moved to the back of the starting grid for failing to meet minimum car weight regulations in post-qualifying inspection.

The race was run in cold temperatures and overcast skies. At the start, Simon Pagenaud held the lead, while James Hinchcliffe moved into second. As the field moved into the first turn, Tony Kanaan and Sébastien Bourdais made contact, bringing out a full course caution and bringing an end to Kanaan's day before he could complete a lap. The race restarted after four caution laps with much cleaner results. On lap six, Will Power lost control of his car entering turn seven while trying to defend from Alexander Rossi. No caution resulted from the spin and Power would finish a lowly 19th. The first round of pit stops came around lap 20. Graham Rahal would lead briefly due to extending fuel farther than anyone else, but would fall back following his own pit stop. The lead was briefly handed to Charlie Kimball, who had beat Pagenaud out of the pits. Pagenaud would not take long to find a way by, however, and was quickly back in the lead.

On lap 37, the second caution of the day came out when Sébastien Bourdais rolled to a halt on track. Most of the leaders pitted under the caution, but Hélio Castroneves and Conor Daly, who had made their first stops early and went off sequence from the leaders, stayed out, handing Castroneves the lead. On the restart, Daly was able to get by Castroneves and take the lead, which he held for 14 laps before coming in for his final pit stop. After Castroneves pitted two laps later, Simon Pagenaud resumed the lead and was able to gain enough of an advantage to not lose it again after his pit stop. Pagenaud took victory by roughly 4.5 seconds over his teammate Castroneves, giving Pagenaud his third consecutive victory and a comfortable lead in the point standings. James Hinchcliffe took the final step of the podium, coming across about half a second after Castroneves. Graham Rahal, despite starting at the back of the field, finished fourth. Despite fading in the last laps of the race, Conor Daly still placed a respectable sixth, making him the highest finishing rookie in the race.

== Report ==
Key	Meaning
R	Rookie
W	Past winner

=== Qualifying ===
Pos	No.	Name	Grp.	Round 1	Round 2	Firestone Fast 6
1	22	(France) Simon Pagenaud W	2	1:08.6748	1:08.7696	1:08.6868
2	83	(United States) Charlie Kimball	1	1:09.2451	1:09.0607	1:08.9816
3	5	(Canada) James Hinchcliffe	2	1:09.0244	1:09.0086	1:09.2260
4	41	(United Kingdom) Jack Hawksworth	1	1:09.1601	1:09.0611	1:09.5141
5	10	(Brazil) Tony Kanaan	2	1:09.0845	1:09.2511	
6	2	(Colombia) Juan Pablo Montoya	1	1:09.3260	1:09.2645	
7	9	(New Zealand) Scott Dixon	1	1:09.2004	1:09.4010	
8	11	(France) Sébastien Bourdais	1	1:09.2463	1:09.4436	
9	7	(Russia) Mikhail Aleshin	1	1:09.2537	1:09.6771	
10	12	(Australia) Will Power W	2	1:08.6746	1:09.9297	
11	8	(United Kingdom) Max Chilton R	1	1:09.3289		
12	98	(United States) Alexander Rossi R	2	1:09.1475		
13	3	(Brazil) Hélio Castroneves	1	1:09.4947		
14	61	(Australia) Matthew Brabham R	2	1:09.2944		
15	28	(United States) Ryan Hunter-Reay	1	1:09.5276		
16	6	(United States) J. R. Hildebrand	2	1:09.4377		
17	26	(Colombia) Carlos Muñoz	1	1:09.6457		
18	16	(United States) Spencer Pigot R	2	1:09.4591		
19	27	(United States) Marco Andretti	1	1:09.7478		
20	14	(Japan) Takuma Sato	2	1:09.4659		
21	35	(Canada) Alex Tagliani	1	1:10.4109		
22	18	(United States) Conor Daly R	2	1:09.4795		
23	19	(Colombia) Gabby Chaves	2	1:09.7720		
24	15	(United States) Graham Rahal	2	Times Disallowed		
25	21	(United States) Josef Newgarden	2	Times Disallowed		
OFFICIAL BOX SCORE

Source for individual rounds:

=== Race results ===
Pos	No.	Driver	Team	Engine	Laps	Status	Pit Stops	Grid	Laps Led	Pts.^{1}
1	22	(France) Simon Pagenaud W	Team Penske	Chevrolet	82	1:50:18.5823	3	1	57	54
2	3	(Brazil) Hélio Castroneves	Team Penske	Chevrolet	82	+4.4748	3	13	7	41
3	5	(Canada) James Hinchcliffe	Schmidt Peterson Motorsports	Honda	82	+5.0807	3	3		35
4	15	(United States) Graham Rahal	Rahal Letterman Lanigan Racing	Honda	82	+7.0715	4	24	2	33
5	83	(United States) Charlie Kimball	Chip Ganassi Racing	Chevrolet	82	+7.4234	3	2	2	31
6	18	(United States) Conor Daly R	Dale Coyne Racing	Honda	82	+12.1838	3	22	14	29
7	9	(New Zealand) Scott Dixon	Chip Ganassi Racing	Chevrolet	82	+12.9226	3	7		26
8	2	(Colombia) Juan Pablo Montoya	Team Penske	Chevrolet	82	+13.6912	4	6		24
9	28	(United States) Ryan Hunter-Reay	Andretti Autosport	Honda	82	+15.1933	3	15		22
10	98	(United States) Alexander Rossi R	Andretti Herta Autosport	Honda	82	+16.3134	3	12		20
11	16	(United States) Spencer Pigot R	Rahal Letterman Lanigan Racing	Honda	82	+20.5172	3	18		19
12	26	(Colombia) Carlos Muñoz	Andretti Autosport	Honda	82	+29.6369	3	17		18
13	7	(Russia) Mikhail Aleshin	Schmidt Peterson Motorsports	Honda	82	+43.3093	3	9		17
14	8	(United Kingdom) Max Chilton R	Chip Ganassi Racing	Chevrolet	82	+43.3785	3	11		16
15	27	(United States) Marco Andretti	Andretti Autosport	Honda	82	+44.6339	3	19		15
16	61	(Australia) Matthew Brabham R	Pirtek Team Murray	Chevrolet	82	+45.5107	3	14		14
17	19	(Colombia) Gabby Chaves	Dale Coyne Racing	Honda	82	+47.0326	4	23		13
18	14	(Japan) Takuma Sato	A. J. Foyt Enterprises	Honda	82	+56.3389	5	20		12
19	12	(Australia) Will Power W	Team Penske	Chevrolet	82	+57.4410	4	10		11
20	41	(United Kingdom) Jack Hawksworth	A. J. Foyt Enterprises	Honda	82	+1:03.7229	3	4		10
21	21	(United States) Josef Newgarden	Ed Carpenter Racing	Chevrolet	82	+1:08.6234	5	25		9
22	6	(United States) J. R. Hildebrand	Ed Carpenter Racing	Chevrolet	81	+1 Lap	4	16		8
23	35	(Canada) Alex Tagliani	A. J. Foyt Enterprises	Honda	81	+1 Lap	5	21		7
24	11	(France) Sébastien Bourdais	KVSH Racing	Chevrolet	20	Mechanical	1	8		6
25	10	(Brazil) Tony Kanaan	Chip Ganassi Racing	Chevrolet	0	Contact	0	5		5
OFFICIAL BOX SCORE

=== Notes ===
All cars ran Dallara chassis with aerokits supplied by their respective engine manufacturer.

^{1} Points include 1 point for leading at least 1 lap during a race, an additional 2 points for leading the most race laps, and 1 point for Pole Position.

Source for time gaps:

== Championship standings after the race ==
Drivers' Championship standings

	Pos	Driver	Points
	1	(France) Simon Pagenaud	242
	2	(New Zealand) Scott Dixon	166
	3	(Colombia) Juan Pablo Montoya	160
	4	(Brazil) Hélio Castroneves	159
1	5	(United States) Graham Rahal	133

- Note: Only the top five positions are included.

Previous race: 2016 Honda Indy Grand Prix of Alabama	IndyCar Series; 2016 season	Next race: 2016 Indianapolis 500
Previous race: 2015 Grand Prix of Indianapolis	Grand Prix of Indianapolis	Next race: 2017 IndyCar Grand Prix
