= 2016 Toyota Grand Prix of Long Beach =

(United States) 2016 Toyota Grand Prix of Long Beach
Race details
3rd round of the 2016 IndyCar Series season
← Previous race	Next race →
- Date: April 17, 2016
- Official name: Toyota Grand Prix of Long Beach
- Location: Streets of Long Beach
- Course: Temporary street circuit 1.968 mi / 3.167 km
- Distance: 80 laps 157.440 mi / 253.375 km

Pole position
- Driver: (Brazil) Hélio Castroneves (Team Penske)
- Time: 1:07.1246

Fastest lap
- Driver: (United States) Charlie Kimball (Chip Ganassi Racing)
- Time: 1:07.6661 (on lap 8 of 80)

Podium
- First: (France) Simon Pagenaud (Team Penske)
- Second: (New Zealand) Scott Dixon (Chip Ganassi Racing)
- Third: (Brazil) Hélio Castroneves (Team Penske)

Chronology
Previous	Next
2015	2017

The 2016 Toyota Grand Prix of Long Beach was the third round of the 2016 IndyCar Series and the 42nd annual running of the Toyota Grand Prix of Long Beach. The race was contested over 80 laps on a temporary street circuit in Long Beach, California on April 17, 2016. Hélio Castroneves qualified on pole for the second consecutive race with a time of 1:07.1246. Chip Ganassi Racing's Scott Dixon started alongside him in second. Some confusion surrounded the second round of qualifying as timing and scoring malfunctioned. IndyCar officials would correct the mistakes caused by this and set the correct Fast Six qualifiers shortly after round two ended. Fast six qualifying was briefly delayed when Will Power clipped a tire barrier and went into a run-off area. Power started sixth due to his mishap.

Castroneves took the lead from the start and led 49 of the opening 51 laps. Behind him, Simon Pagenaud was able to move his way past Scott Dixon into second, while Dixon was scuffled down to fourth by the time the first round of pit stops came. During pit stops, Dixon was able to leapfrog Pagenaud and his teammate Tony Kanaan to move up to second. At the second round of stops, Dixon was able to pass Castroneves with quick pit work. However, Simon Pagenaud was able to move even faster and get out of the pits just ahead of Dixon, handing Pagenaud the lead of the race. Controversy surrounded this, though, as Pagenaud placed two tires over the blend line at the exit of pit lane while trying to beat Dixon to turn one. IndyCar officials let Pagenaud off with a warning for the incident, despite protests from Chip Ganassi Racing and Scott Dixon. In the end, Pagenaud was able to hold on and take victory by 0.3032 seconds, the closest finish in the history of the Grand Prix of Long Beach. It was Pagenaud's first victory while driving for Team Penske and his first win since the second race of the 2014 Grand Prix of Houston.

For only the 4th time in the history of the race, no full course caution occurred at any point and for the second year in a row, there were no DNFs.

== Report ==
Key	Meaning
R	Rookie
W	Past winner

=== Qualifying ===
Pos	No.	Name	Grp.	Round 1	Round 2	Round 3
1	3	(Brazil) Hélio Castroneves W	2	1:07.4449	1:07.0645	1:07.1246
2	9	(New Zealand) Scott Dixon W	1	1:07.5019	1:06.6459	1:07.4455
3	22	(France) Simon Pagenaud	1	1:07.6822	1:07.0578	1:07.7410
4	10	(Brazil) Tony Kanaan	2	1:07.5998	1:07.0624	1:07.7951
5	2	(Colombia) Juan Pablo Montoya W	1	1:07.5156	1:06.9409	1:07.9054
6	12	(Australia) Will Power W	2	1:06.9712	1:06.8659	No Time
7	5	(Canada) James Hinchcliffe	1	1:07.6425	1:07.1415	
8	14	(Japan) Takuma Sato W	1	1:07.7038	1:07.2299	
9	21	(United States) Josef Newgarden	2	1:07.4794	1:07.2548	
10	26	(Colombia) Carlos Muñoz	2	1:07.3962	1:07.2663	
11	28	(United States) Ryan Hunter-Reay W	1	1:07.7111	1:07.3171	
12	19	(Italy) Luca Filippi	2	1:07.6214	1:07.9660	
13	18	(United States) Conor Daly R	1	1:07.7520		
14	11	(France) Sébastien Bourdais W	2	1:07.6432		
15	83	(United States) Charlie Kimball	1	1:07.8065		
16	98	(United States) Alexander Rossi R	2	1:07.6872		
17	15	(United States) Graham Rahal	1	1:07.8841		
18	7	(Russia) Mikhail Aleshin	2	1:07.8513		
19	8	(United Kingdom) Max Chilton R	1	1:08.3843		
20	41	(United Kingdom) Jack Hawksworth	2	1:07.9929		
21	27	(United States) Marco Andretti	2	1:08.2045		
OFFICIAL BOX SCORE

=== Race results ===
Pos	No.	Driver	Team	Engine	Laps	Time/Retired	Pit Stops	Grid	Laps Led	Pts.^{1}
1	22	(France) Simon Pagenaud	Team Penske	Chevrolet	80	1:33:54.4835	2	3	28	51
2	9	(New Zealand) Scott Dixon W	Chip Ganassi Racing	Chevrolet	80	+0.3032	2	2	2	41
3	3	(Brazil) Hélio Castroneves W	Team Penske	Chevrolet	80	+10.8376	2	1	47	39
4	2	(Colombia) Juan Pablo Montoya W	Team Penske	Chevrolet	80	+12.2162	2	5		32
5	14	(Japan) Takuma Sato W	A. J. Foyt Enterprises	Honda	80	+12.2918	2	8		30
6	10	(Brazil) Tony Kanaan	Chip Ganassi Racing	Chevrolet	80	+17.6267	2	4		28
7	12	(Australia) Will Power W	Team Penske	Chevrolet	80	+18.7449	2	6		26
8	5	(Canada) James Hinchcliffe	Schmidt Peterson Motorsports	Honda	80	+19.0362	2	7		24
9	11	(France) Sébastien Bourdais W	KVSH Racing	Chevrolet	80	+22.9147	2	14		22
10	21	(United States) Josef Newgarden	Ed Carpenter Racing	Chevrolet	80	+23.6654	2	9		20
11	83	(United States) Charlie Kimball	Chip Ganassi Racing	Chevrolet	80	+24.2179	3	15	3	20
12	26	(Colombia) Carlos Muñoz	Andretti Autosport	Honda	80	+40.1250	2	10		18
13	18	(United States) Conor Daly R	Dale Coyne Racing	Honda	80	+47.1809	2	13		17
14	8	(United Kingdom) Max Chilton R	Chip Ganassi Racing	Chevrolet	80	+53.9106	3	19		16
15	15	(United States) Graham Rahal	Rahal Letterman Lanigan Racing	Honda	80	+56.9082	2	17		15
16	7	(Russia) Mikhail Aleshin	Schmidt Peterson Motorsports	Honda	80	+1:01.2966	2	18		14
17	19	(Italy) Luca Filippi	Dale Coyne Racing	Honda	80	+1:08.0543	2	12		13
18	28	(United States) Ryan Hunter-Reay W	Andretti Autosport	Honda	80	+1:30.3302	3	11		12
19	27	(United States) Marco Andretti	Andretti Autosport	Honda	79	+1 Lap	3	21		11
20	98	(United States) Alexander Rossi R	Andretti Herta Autosport	Honda	79	+1 Lap	2	16		10
21	41	(United Kingdom) Jack Hawksworth	A. J. Foyt Enterprises	Honda	77	+3 Laps	3	20		9
OFFICIAL BOX SCORE

Notes

^{1} Points include 1 point for leading at least 1 lap during a race, an additional 2 points for leading the most race laps, and 1 point for Pole Position.

Source for time gaps:

== Championship standings after the race ==
Drivers' Championship standings

	Pos	Driver	Points
	1	(France) Simon Pagenaud	134
	2	(New Zealand) Scott Dixon	120
	3	(Colombia) Juan Pablo Montoya	106
2	4	(Brazil) Hélio Castroneves	92
	5	(Brazil) Tony Kanaan	82

- Note: Only the top five positions are included.

Previous race: 2016 Desert Diamond West Valley Phoenix Grand Prix	IndyCar Series; 2016 season	Next race: 2016 Honda Indy Grand Prix of Alabama
Previous race: 2015 Toyota Grand Prix of Long Beach	Toyota Grand Prix of Long Beach	Next race: 2017 Toyota Grand Prix of Long Beach
