= 2016 Honda Indy Grand Prix of Alabama =

(United States) 2016 Alabama
Race details
4th round of the 2016 IndyCar Series season
← Previous race	Next race →
- Date: April 24, 2016
- Official name: Honda Indy Grand Prix of Alabama
- Location: Barber Motorsports Park
- Course: Permanent racing facility 2.38 mi / 3.83 km
- Distance: 90 laps 214.2 mi / 344.7 km

Pole position
- Driver: (France) Simon Pagenaud (Team Penske)
- Time: 1:06.7262

Fastest lap
- Driver: (New Zealand) Scott Dixon (Chip Ganassi Racing)
- Time: 1:08.4533 (on lap 66 of 90)

Podium
- First: (France) Simon Pagenaud (Team Penske)
- Second: (United States) Graham Rahal (Rahal Letterman Lanigan Racing)
- Third: (United States) Josef Newgarden (Ed Carpenter Racing)

The 2016 Honda Indy Grand Prix of Alabama was the 4th round of the 2016 IndyCar Series. The race was contested over 90 laps at Barber Motorsports Park in Birmingham, Alabama. It was the 7th time that the IndyCar Series had raced on the circuit. In qualifying, Simon Pagenaud took pole position with a time of 1:06.7762, beating out his teammate Will Power. Sébastien Bourdais set a new track record during the second round of qualifications with a time of 1:06.6001, but was unable to match that pace in the third round of qualifying, relegating him to a fifth place start. Championship contender Juan Pablo Montoya struggled heavily in qualifying, placing 21st and last.

The race opened with an incident before it even started. As the field came off the final turn to prepare to take the green flag, Carlos Muñoz tipped Mikhail Aleshin into a spin, sending Aleshin and Jack Hawksworth off into the outside grass. All involved escaped major damage, while the rest of the field ran an extra lap under yellow before the start. It would be the only caution flag of the day. Simon Pagenaud held the lead when the race started, with Power slotting in behind him. Further back in the field, Sébastien Bourdais and Scott Dixon made contact in turn five, sending Dixon into a spin and causing front wing damage to Bourdais' car. Both would continue, but their races were both greatly hampered due to the incident.

Pagenaud dominated the majority of the race. However, in the closing laps, Pagenaud was held up in lap traffic, allowing Graham Rahal to catch up and set a thrilling duel for the lead. On lap 82, Rahal and Pagenaud made contact entering turn seven, sending Pagenaud off course and handing Rahal the lead. The lead would be short lived, as four laps later, Pagenaud caught back up and attempted to make a pass at the exit of turn six. In the middle of the move, Rahal made contact with back-marker Jack Hawksworth, damaging Rahal's front wing and ending any chance of holding off Pagenaud. Pagenaud would extend his lead and take victory by 13.7 seconds. It was Pagenaud second consecutive victory of the season. Despite his damaged wing, Rahal managed to hang on and finish second. Josef Newgarden finished third. Despite his terrible starting position, Juan Pablo Montoya was able to charge through the field and finish in a respectable fifth place. The highest finishing rookie was Alexander Rossi, who came across the line in 15th, the last car on the lead lap.

For the second year in a row, there were no DNFs.

== Report ==
Key	Meaning
R	Rookie
W	Past winner

=== Qualifying ===
Pos	No.	Name	Grp.	Round 1	Round 2	Round 3
1	22	(France) Simon Pagenaud	2	1:06.7630	1:06.8665	1:06.7262
2	12	(Australia) Will Power W	2	1:06.7274	1:06.7742	1:06.9421
3	21	(United States) Josef Newgarden W	2	1:06.7668	1:06.9900	1:07.0283
4	9	(New Zealand) Scott Dixon	1	1:06.8810	1:06.6522	1:07.2083
5	11	(France) Sébastien Bourdais	1	1:06.9427	1:06.6001	1:07.2965
6	15	(United States) Graham Rahal	1	1:07.1635	1:06.8166	1:07.6388
7	3	(Brazil) Hélio Castroneves W	1	1:07.0125	1:07.0129	
8	5	(Canada) James Hinchcliffe	2	1:07.2048	1:07.0955	
9	10	(Brazil) Tony Kanaan	2	1:07.1972	1:07.1715	
10	83	(United States) Charlie Kimball	1	1:07.1954	1:07.3020	
11	8	(United Kingdom) Max Chilton R	1	1:07.2408	1:08.0728	
12	19	(Italy) Luca Filippi	2	1:07.2243	1:08.3655	
13	7	(Russia) Mikhail Aleshin	1	1:07.2417		
14	41	(United Kingdom) Jack Hawksworth	2	1:07.2360		
15	26	(Colombia) Carlos Muñoz	1	1:07.2435		
16	14	(Japan) Takuma Sato	2	1:07.2385		
17	18	(United States) Conor Daly R	1	1:07.2974		
18	28	(United States) Ryan Hunter-Reay W	2	1:07.4449		
19	27	(United States) Marco Andretti	1	1:07.6570		
20	98	(United States) Alexander Rossi R	2	1:07.5612		
21	2	(Colombia) Juan Pablo Montoya	2	1:07.5627		
OFFICIAL BOX SCORE

Source for individual rounds:

=== Race results ===
Pos	No.	Driver	Team	Engine	Laps	Time/Retired	Pit Stops	Grid	Laps Led	Pts.^{1}
1	22	(France) Simon Pagenaud	Team Penske	Chevrolet	90	1:48:42.3334	3	1	84	54
2	15	(United States) Graham Rahal	Rahal Letterman Lanigan Racing	Honda	90	+13.7476	3	6	6	41
3	21	(United States) Josef Newgarden W	Ed Carpenter Racing	Chevrolet	90	+15.8039	3	3		35
4	12	(Australia) Will Power W	Team Penske	Chevrolet	90	+16.7315	3	2		32
5	2	(Colombia) Juan Pablo Montoya	Team Penske	Chevrolet	90	+21.1160	3	21		30
6	5	(Canada) James Hinchcliffe	Schmidt Peterson Motorsports	Honda	90	+23.6222	3	8		28
7	3	(Brazil) Hélio Castroneves W	Team Penske	Chevrolet	90	+25.5391	3	7		26
8	10	(Brazil) Tony Kanaan	Chip Ganassi Racing	Chevrolet	90	+27.9007	3	9		24
9	83	(United States) Charlie Kimball	Chip Ganassi Racing	Chevrolet	90	+31.8726	3	10		22
10	9	(New Zealand) Scott Dixon	Chip Ganassi Racing	Chevrolet	90	+39.0603	3	4		20
11	28	(United States) Ryan Hunter-Reay W	Andretti Autosport	Honda	90	+40.7485	3	18		19
12	27	(United States) Marco Andretti	Andretti Autosport	Honda	90	+53.3648	3	19		18
13	14	(Japan) Takuma Sato	A. J. Foyt Enterprises	Honda	90	+55.2122	3	16		17
14	26	(Colombia) Carlos Muñoz	Andretti Autosport	Honda	90	+1:03.5214	3	15		16
15	98	(United States) Alexander Rossi R	Andretti Herta Autosport	Honda	90	+1:04.8861	3	20		15
16	11	(France) Sébastien Bourdais	KVSH Racing	Chevrolet	89	+1 Lap	5	5		14
17	7	(Russia) Mikhail Aleshin	Schmidt Peterson Motorsports	Honda	89	+1 Lap	3	13		13
18	19	(Italy) Luca Filippi	Dale Coyne Racing	Honda	89	+1 Lap	3	12		12
19	41	(United Kingdom) Jack Hawksworth	A. J. Foyt Enterprises	Honda	89	+1 Lap	3	14		11
20	18	(United States) Conor Daly R	Dale Coyne Racing	Honda	89	+1 Lap	3	17		10
21	8	(United Kingdom) Max Chilton R	Chip Ganassi Racing	Chevrolet	89	+1 Lap	3	11		9
OFFICIAL BOX SCORE

Notes

^{1} Points include 1 point for leading at least 1 lap during a race, an additional 2 points for leading the most race laps, and 1 point for Pole Position.

Source for time gaps:

== Championship standings after the race ==
Drivers' Championship standings

Pos	Driver	Points
1	(France) Simon Pagenaud	188
2	(New Zealand) Scott Dixon	140
3	(Colombia) Juan Pablo Montoya	136
4	(Brazil) Hélio Castroneves	118
5	(Brazil) Tony Kanaan	106

- Note: Only the top five positions are included.

Previous race: 2016 Toyota Grand Prix of Long Beach	IndyCar Series; 2016 season	Next race: 2016 Angie's List Grand Prix of Indianapolis
Previous race: 2015 Honda Indy Grand Prix of Alabama	Indy Grand Prix of Alabama	Next race: 2017 Honda Indy Grand Prix of Alabama
