= 2016 Indianapolis 500 =

American motor race

100th Indianapolis 500

Indianapolis Motor Speedway

Indianapolis 500
- Sanctioning body: IndyCar
- Season: 2016 IndyCar season
- Date: May 29, 2016
- Winner: (United States) Alexander Rossi (R)
- Winning team: Andretti Herta Autosport w/ Curb-Agajanian
- Winning Chief Mechanic: Tom German
- Average speed: 166.634 mph (268.171 km/h)
- Pole position: (Canada) James Hinchcliffe
- Pole speed: 230.760 mph (371.372 km/h)
- Fastest qualifier: (Canada) James Hinchcliffe
- Rookie of the Year: (United States) Alexander Rossi
- Most laps led: (United States) Ryan Hunter-Reay (52)

Pre-race ceremonies
- National anthem: Darius Rucker
- "Back Home Again in Indiana": Josh Kaufman
- Starting command: Mari Hulman George and family
- Pace car: Chevrolet Camaro
- Pace car driver: Roger Penske
- Two-seater: Mario Andretti (driver); Lady Gaga (passenger)
- Starter: Paul Blevin
- Honorary starter: Chris Pine

Television in the United States
- Network: ABC (including WRTV, blackout lifted due to sellout)
- Announcers: Allen Bestwick, Scott Goodyear, Eddie Cheever
- Nielsen ratings: 3.9 / 6.0M viewers

Chronology
Previous	Next
2015	2017

The 2016 Indianapolis 500 (branded as the 100th Running of the Indianapolis 500 presented by PennGrade Motor Oil for sponsorship reasons) took place on Sunday, May 29, 2016, at the Indianapolis Motor Speedway in Speedway, Indiana. It was the premier event of the 2016 Verizon IndyCar Series season. 24 year-old rookie Alexander Rossi of Andretti Herta Autosport w/ Curb-Agajanian won the race on fuel mileage over Carlos Muñoz and Josef Newgarden. Two-time winner Juan Pablo Montoya entered the race as the defending champion.

Over the final ten laps, most of the leaders were cycling through pit stops, as no one was expected to make it to the finish without pitting for fuel. Most drivers had not pitted since the previous caution that ended on lap 166. Alexander Rossi's team took a gamble and coached the driver into saving fuel. As the other leaders made their stops, Rossi stayed out and inherited the lead on lap 197. He slowed down to save fuel, but on the final lap Carlos Muñoz began charging to catch up. Coming out of turn four on the final lap, Rossi pulled to the inside and coasted across the finish line to take the checkered flag. Muñoz finished 4.4975 seconds behind, his second runner-up finish at Indy (2013, 2016). Rossi, out of fuel, came to a stop during his cool down lap. A tow truck brought him in, believed to be the first time in Indy history that the race winner was towed back to victory lane.

The 2016 race marked a milestone as the 100th running of the Indianapolis 500. The race came five years after the event's Centennial Era, a three-year long commemoration which celebrated the 100th anniversary of the opening of the circuit (1909), and the 100th anniversary of the first Indy 500 (1911). The 2016 running was the ninety-ninth scheduled 500-mile race of the canon, as the 1916 race was scheduled as a 300-mile race. (Note: Although the first race was held in 1911, the Indianapolis 500 was not held in 1917 and 1918 due to World War I, and was again cancelled from 1942 to 1945 owing to World War II. The 1916 race is part of the canon, despite having been only scheduled for 300 miles.) It also commemorated the bicentennial of Indiana statehood.

The month of May activities at the Speedway opened May 14 with the third annual Grand Prix of Indianapolis. Indianapolis 500 practice began on Monday, May 16. Time trials were held on May 21–22, with James Hinchcliffe winning the pole position. Hinchcliffe's pole came just over one year to the day after suffering near-fatal injuries in a practice crash in 2015. Carb Day, the traditional final practice session, and the annual Pit Stop Challenge, was held May 27. Considerable pre-race hype surrounded the milestone event, and for the first time the race was announced as a complete sellout; as a result, the local television blackout of the ABC broadcast was lifted for the first time.

== Race background ==
The Indianapolis Motor Speedway is a 2.5-mile oval circuit with four turns banked at 9°.

Going into the race, Simon Pagenaud of Team Penske had mostly dominated the first five races of the 2016 IndyCar season. He finished second in the first two events (St. Petersburg and Phoenix), and won the next three races (Long Beach, Alabama, and the Grand Prix of Indianapolis) to take a sizable lead in the championship points standings.

The most discussed issues in the weeks leading up the race involved the ongoing development of aero kit regulations, and the competitive balance between the two engine manufacturers (Chevrolet and Honda). After three major crashes in 2015, in which cars flipped over and became airborne, series officials attempted to address the situation by adding "dome skids" - aerodynamic devices affixed to the undertrays of the cars, designed to keep the cars on the ground during a crash. This rule change was met with some resistance, particularly from the Honda teams, after testing revealed them to be unsettling to the cars' handling. After practice opened, however, the issues appeared to have been mostly resolved. None of the crashes that occurred during practice or qualifying saw the respective cars flip over. With respect to the engine competition, Chevrolet entered the month having swept all five race wins and all five race pole positions. In addition, Chevrolet had noticeably outperformed Honda in the 2015 race, sweeping the top five spots in qualifying, as well as the top four positions on race day. After practice opened, however, Honda teams led the speed chart on three of the four days (one day was rained out), and also secured the pole position - Honda's first Indy 500 pole since 2011.

Early in the month of May, Speedway officials announced that the grandstand seating for the race had sold out. It marked the first sell-out since before 2003. On May 25, Speedway officials announced that the race had reached a total sellout with all general admission tickets sold. In addition, it was announced that for the first time since 1950, the race would not be blacked out for the local television audience.

This race would turn out to be the final race of Alex Tagliani's career. For 2017 and onwards, Tagliani would shift his focus to mainly NASCAR. This would also be the final race for Townsend Bell after 13 seasons in IndyCar. After this race, Bell would shift his focus to sports cars racing in the IMSA SportsCar Championship from 2017 onwards.

=== Regulations and rule changes ===
- Minimum car weight was increased from 1580 pounds to 1610 pounds to accommodate enhancements made to the Suspension Wheel/Wing Energy Management System (SWEMS).
- Rookie Orientation was revised for 2016. Each rookie driver was required to complete the following three phases: 10 laps at 210-215 mph (346 km/h); 15 laps at 215-220 mph (350 km/h); 15 laps at over 220 mph (350 km/h). The changes represented an increase of 5 mph (8.0 km/h) as compared to the previous year.
- All cars utilized a uniform E85 fuel mixture. Previously, Chevrolet entries were allowed an additive.
- Domed skid plates and rear wing beam flaps were made mandatory. Domed skids were affixed to the underside of the chassis, designed to reduce the chance of cars becoming airborne during a crash. Rear wing beam flaps deploy during a spin or when the car is travelling backward and disrupt the airflow to create downforce and reduce the chance of a car becoming airborne.
- Each entry was allowed 36 sets of tires (Firestone) total, for practice, time trials, and for the race. This remained the same from 2015. The special compound "red" tires are not used for oval events.
- Engines were permitted 130 kPa of turbocharger "boost" during practice from May 16–20. Cars were allowed 140 kPa of "boost" on Fast Friday practice, and during time trials. The "boost" level reverted to 130 kPa for Carb day and race day.

=== Sponsorship ===
For the first time in race history, the Indianapolis 500 had a presenting sponsor: the PennGrade brand of the Lebanon, Indiana-based D-A Lubricant company. D-A Lubricant has had a long history of involvement in the Indianapolis 500, having historically sponsored teams at the race in the late-1950s, and being a current associate sponsor of Rahal Letterman Lanigan Racing. Although terms of the deal were not officially announced, the Indianapolis Star reported via sources that it is a three-year deal valued around $5 million.

== Entry list ==
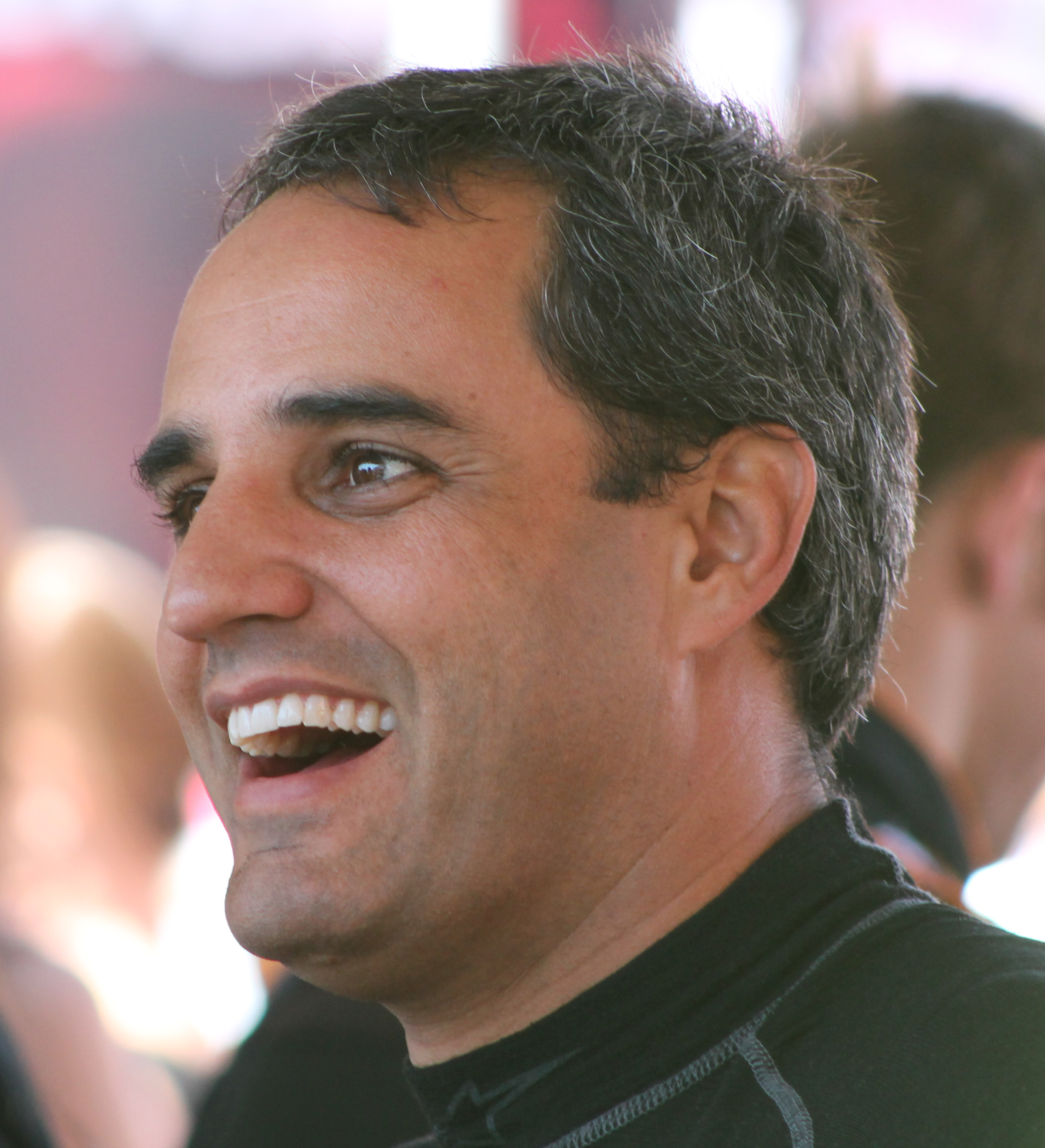
Juan Pablo Montoya is a two-time race winner (2000, 2015) and entered as the defending champion.

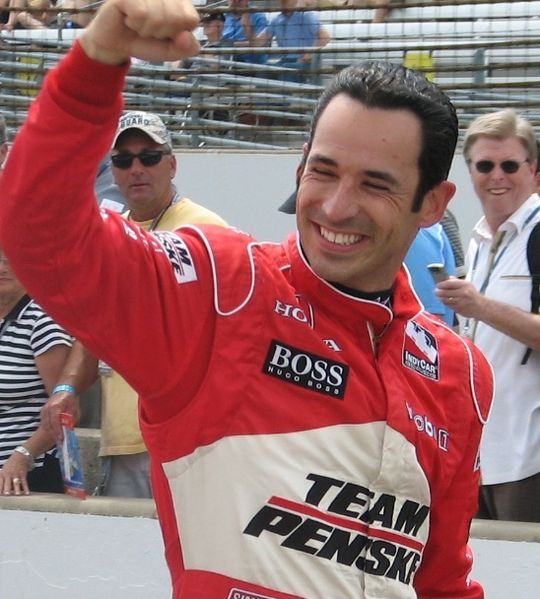
Hélio Castroneves is a four-time winner of the Indianapolis 500 (2001, 2002, 2009, 2021) and four-time pole position winner.

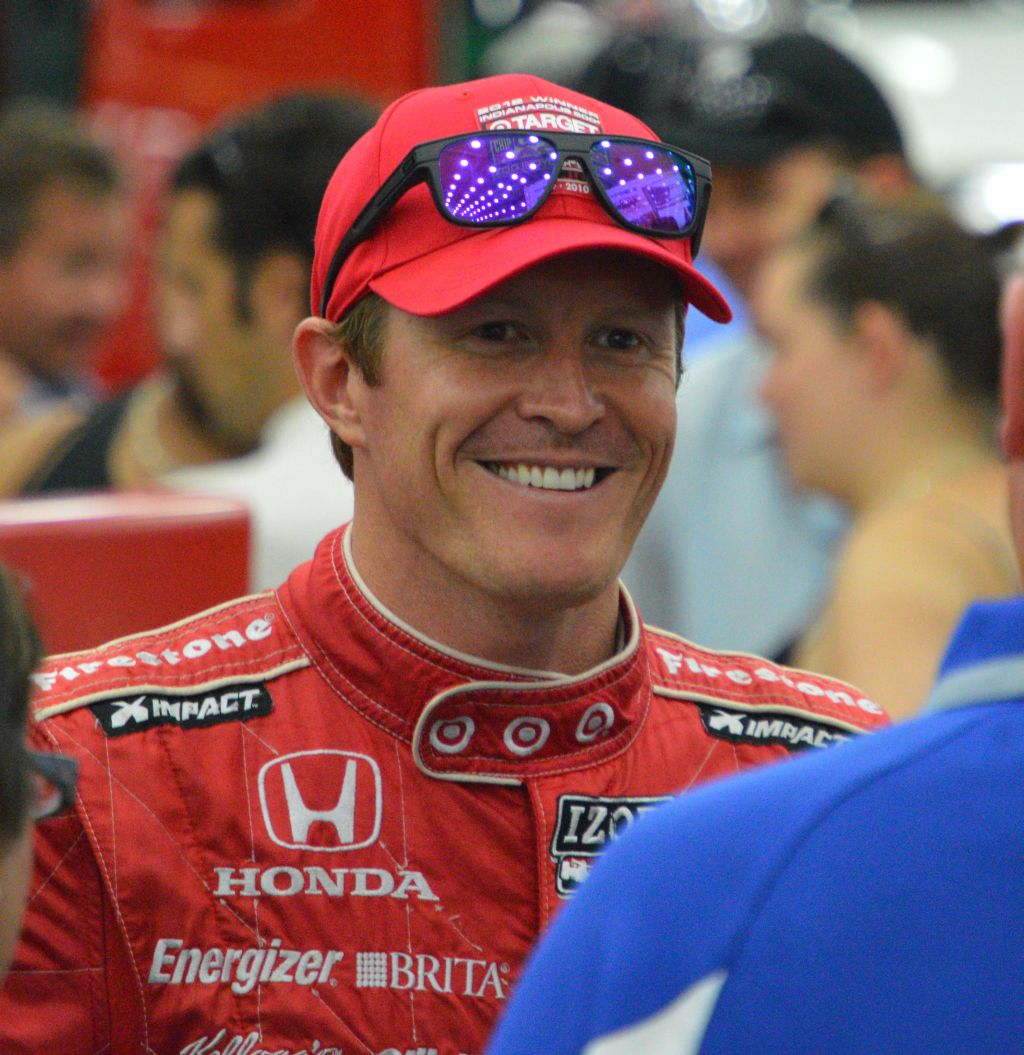
Scott Dixon is a former winner, and two-time former pole winner.

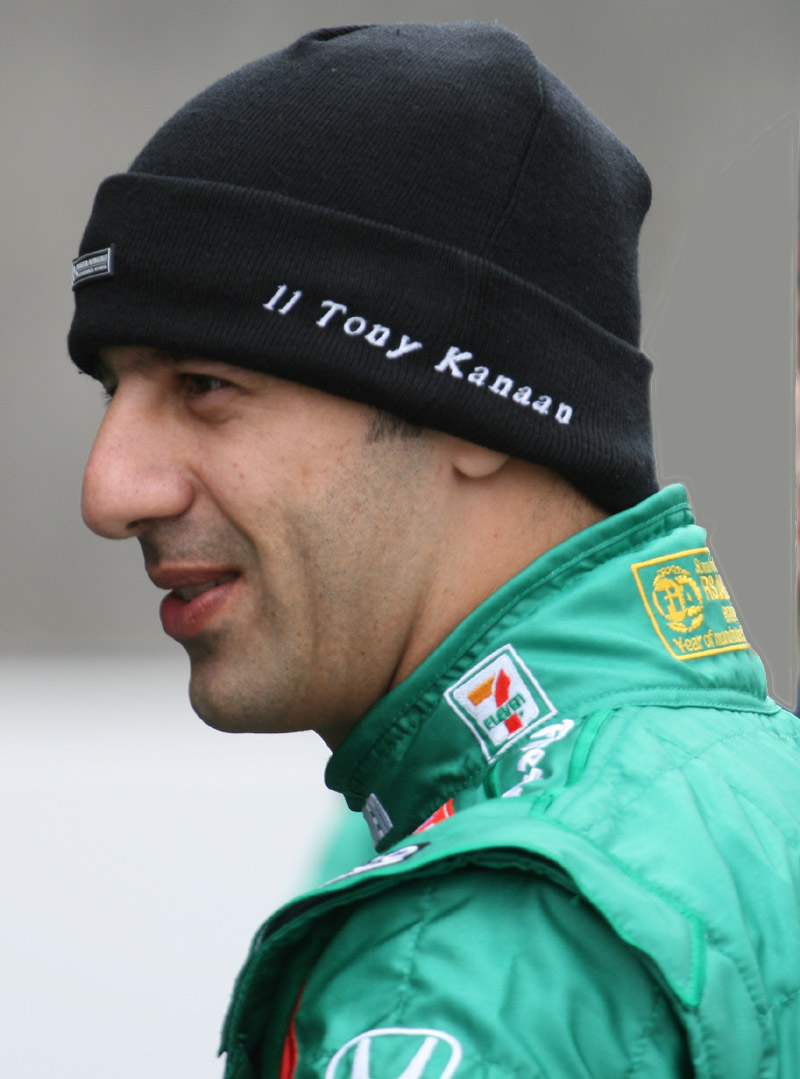
Tony Kanaan is a former race winner and pole winner.

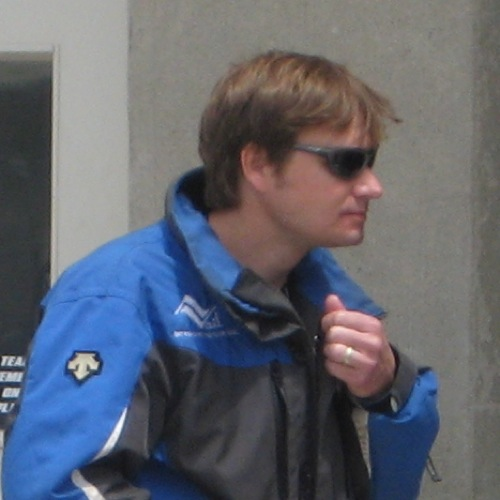
Buddy Lazier, the 1996 winner.

- Matthew Brabham, son of Geoff Brabham, and grandson of Sir Jack Brabham entered with KV Racing Technology. Brabham became the third third-generation driver to qualify in Indy 500 history. The previous two were Billy Vukovich III and Marco Andretti.
- Buddy Lazier drove for Lazier Partners Racing. The 2016 running marked the 20th anniversary of Lazier's Indy 500 victory.
- Alex Tagliani carried No. 35 for A. J. Foyt Enterprises in honor of Foyt's record of 35 consecutive starts in the race as a driver.
- Stefan Wilson the younger brother of Justin Wilson, who was killed in a racing incident at the Pocono in August 2015. drove for KVSH Racing. The car carried No. 25, a tribute to the number Justin drove in the 2015 season.

W Winner R Rookie

No.	Driver	Team	Engine/ aero kit
2	(Colombia) Juan Pablo Montoya W	Team Penske	Chevrolet
3	(Brazil) Hélio Castroneves W	Team Penske	Chevrolet
4	(United States) Buddy Lazier W	Lazier Burns Racing	Chevrolet
5	(Canada) James Hinchcliffe	Schmidt Peterson Motorsports	Honda
6	(United States) J. R. Hildebrand	Ed Carpenter Racing	Chevrolet
7	(Russia) Mikhail Aleshin	Schmidt Peterson Motorsports	Honda
8	(United Kingdom) Max Chilton R	Chip Ganassi Racing	Chevrolet
9	(New Zealand) Scott Dixon W	Chip Ganassi Racing	Chevrolet
10	(Brazil) Tony Kanaan W	Chip Ganassi Racing	Chevrolet
11	(France) Sébastien Bourdais	KVSH Racing	Chevrolet
12	(Australia) Will Power	Team Penske	Chevrolet
14	(Japan) Takuma Sato	A. J. Foyt Enterprises	Honda
15	(United States) Graham Rahal	Rahal Letterman Lanigan Racing	Honda
16	(United States) Spencer Pigot R	Rahal Letterman Lanigan Racing	Honda
18	(United States) Conor Daly	Dale Coyne Racing	Honda
19	(Colombia) Gabby Chaves	Dale Coyne Racing	Honda
20	(United States) Ed Carpenter	Ed Carpenter Racing	Chevrolet
21	(United States) Josef Newgarden	Ed Carpenter Racing	Chevrolet
22	(France) Simon Pagenaud	Team Penske	Chevrolet
24	(United States) Sage Karam	Dreyer & Reinbold Racing	Chevrolet
25	(United Kingdom) Stefan Wilson R	KVSH Racing	Chevrolet
26	(Colombia) Carlos Muñoz	Andretti Autosport	Honda
27	(United States) Marco Andretti	Andretti Autosport	Honda
28	(United States) Ryan Hunter-Reay W	Andretti Autosport	Honda
29	(United States) Townsend Bell	Andretti Autosport	Honda
35	(Canada) Alex Tagliani	A. J. Foyt Enterprises	Honda
41	(United Kingdom) Jack Hawksworth	A. J. Foyt Enterprises	Honda
42	(United States) Charlie Kimball	Chip Ganassi Racing	Chevrolet
61	(Australia) Matthew Brabham R	PIRTEK Team Murray	Chevrolet
63	(United Kingdom) Pippa Mann	Dale Coyne Racing	Honda
77	(Spain) Oriol Servià	Schmidt Peterson Motorsports	Honda
88	(United States) Bryan Clauson	Jonathan Byrd's Racing	Honda
98	(United States) Alexander Rossi R	Andretti Herta Autosport w/ Curb-Agajanian	Honda

== Schedule ==
Race schedules — May 2016
Sun	Mon	Tue	Wed	Thu	Fri	Sat
1	2	3	4	5	6	7 Mini-Marathon
8	9	10	11; Road to Indy; Open test	12; Grand Prix; Practice	13; Grand Prix; Qualifying	14; Angie's List GP of Indianapolis
15; Car conversion day	16; ROP; Practice	17; Practice	18; Practice	19; Practice	20; Practice; Fast Friday	21; Time Trials
22; Pole Day	23; Practice	24	25	26; Indy Lights; Qualifying	27; Carb Day; Freedom 100	28; Legends Day; Parade
29; Indianapolis; 500	30; Memorial; Day	31				

Color	Notes
Green	Practice
Dark blue	Time trials
Silver	Race day
Red	Rained out*
Blank	No track activity

* Includes days where track
activity was significantly limited due to rain

- Source: Indianapolis Motor Speedway

== Testing and rookie orientation ==
=== Manufacturer's test – Tuesday, April 5 ===
Four Chevrolet teams and one Honda team conducted a private test at the Speedway on Tuesday, April 5. The test was primarily to evaluate dome skids, a titanium safety device affixed to the underside of the chassis intended to reduce the chance of cars becoming airborne in a crash. Honda teams had already tested the dome skids once at Fontana. A new rear wing flap was also added being tested.

Marco Andretti was the lone Honda participant on Tuesday. Chevrolet participants included Sébastien Bourdais, Ed Carpenter, Hélio Castroneves, Scott Dixon and Juan Pablo Montoya. Temperatures were cool, and no incidents were reported.

=== Safety test – Wednesday, April 6 ===
- Weather: 64 °F (18 °C), mostly cloudy and windy
- Summary: An open test was held on Wednesday, April 6 to allow teams to test new and old aero kit configurations for use during the month of May. Marco Andretti (223.427 mph (359.571 km/h)) set the fastest lap of the day in a Honda machine. Simon Pagenaud (221.293 mph (356.137 km/h)) was the fastest of the Chevrolet participants. A total of fifteen cars attended the test. Weather conditions were not favorable. Winds gusted to 40 mph (64 km/h), with temperatures in the low 60s (°F). After a morning test session, a rain shower closed the track for two hours during the middle of the afternoon. After the track was dried, a late afternoon session was held. No incidents were reported.

One week after the test sessions, IndyCar officials announced revised regulations for the aero kits. The domed skid plates were made mandatory, and optional underwing sidewalls were extended.

Top practice speeds — overall
Pos	No.	Driver	Team	Engine/ aero kit	Speed
1	27	(United States) Marco Andretti	Andretti Autosport	Honda	223.427
2	28	(United States) Ryan Hunter-Reay	Andretti Autosport	Honda	222.047
3	22	(France) Simon Pagenaud	Team Penske	Chevrolet	221.293
Official report

=== Rookie Orientation and Refresher Tests – Monday, May 16 ===
Rookie orientation and veteran refresher tests were held on the first day of practice from 12:00 p.m. to 2:00 p.m. The 40-lap rookie test consisted of three phases demonstrating car control, placement, and a consistent driving pattern. Phase one consists of 10 laps over 210 mph (340 km/h), phase two consists of 15 laps at 215 mph (346 km/h), and phase three requires 15 laps at over 220 mph (350 km/h). Five rookies took part in the session. Alexander Rossi, Max Chilton, and Spencer Pigot passed all three phases. Matthew Brabham and Stefan Wilson passed the first two phases, and were permitted to pass the third phase during any open practice session. Both successfully completed the final phase in the full-field session later that day.

== Practice ==
=== Monday, May 16 ===
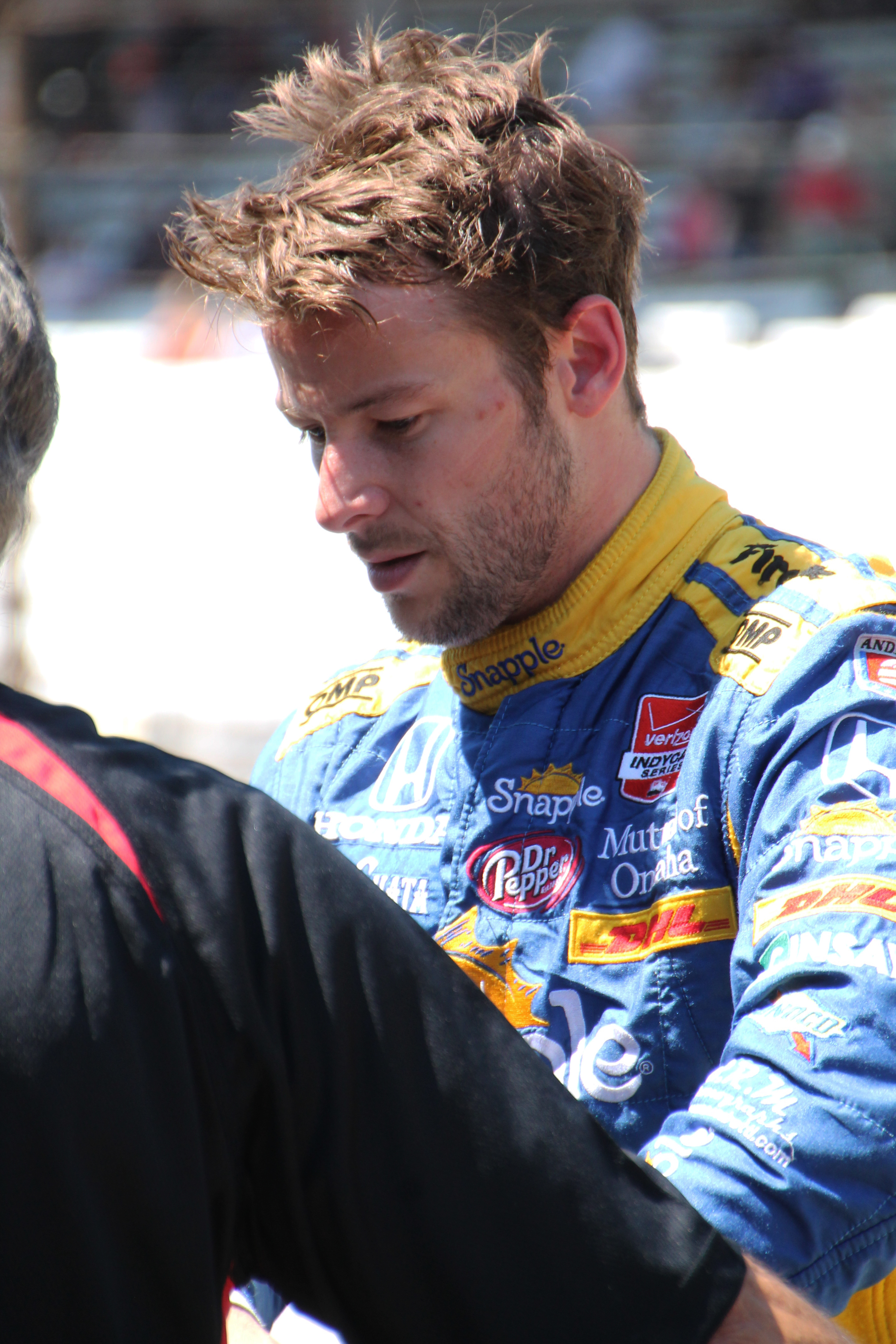
Marco Andretti led practice on May 16.

- Weather: 63 °F (17 °C), overcast
- Practice summary: The first day of practice was scheduled Monday, May 16. The day opened with the rookie orientation and refresher tests. Townsend Bell led the way in the early session, while rookies Max Chilton, Spencer Pigot, and Alexander Rossi each completed all three stages of the orientation program. At 2:00 p.m., the track was opened for the full field. During this time, the other two rookies, Matthew Brabham and Stefan Wilson, successfully completed their orientation programs. All 33 entries completed at least installation laps during the four hour session, with a grand total of 1,474 laps being turned on the day. No major incidents occurred during the session. Andretti Autosport led the speed chart for the day, with five of the top six drivers being from the team. Marco Andretti set the fastest lap of the day at 228.978 mph (368.504 km/h), while teammate Townsend Bell set the fastest "no-tow" lap at 223.940 mph (360.396 km/h).

Top practice speeds — practice
Pos	No.	Driver	Team	Engine/ aero kit	Speed
1	27	(United States) Marco Andretti	Andretti Autosport	Honda	228.978
2	26	(Colombia) Carlos Muñoz	Andretti Autosport	Honda	228.945
3	28	(United States) Ryan Hunter-Reay	Andretti Autosport	Honda	228.003
Official report

=== Tuesday, May 17 ===
- Weather: 58 °F (14 °C), cloudy and rain
- Practice summary: Rain washed out practice for the day. The track was closed at 2:45 p.m. It was the first practice day completely lost due to rain since 2011.

=== Wednesday, May 18 ===
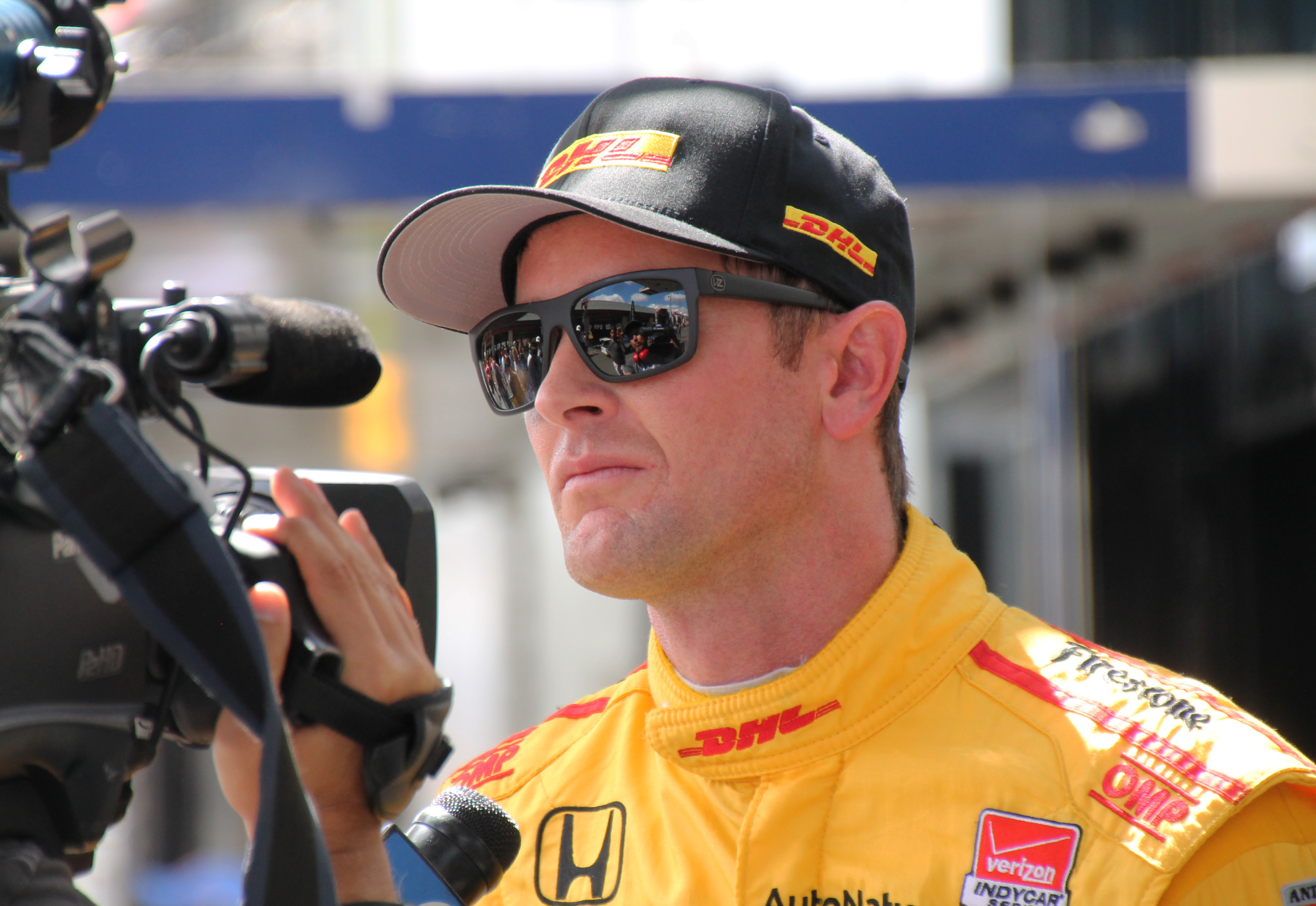
Ryan Hunter-Reay set the fastest time during May 18th practice.

- Weather: 68 °F (20 °C), partly cloudy
- Practice summary: At 1:55 p.m., Spencer Pigot suffered the first crash of the week. In turn one, Pigot did a half-spin, and slid into the outside wall with the left side of the car. Pigot climbed from the car uninjured, but the car was heavily damaged. No other accidents occurred on the day, but two mechanical failures would also bring brief halts to practice. Around 3:20 p.m., Matthew Brabham rolled to a halt in turn three with no power to his car. Just after 5:00 p.m., the second mechanical failure of the day occurred when the engine on Mikhail Aleshin's car failed and began spewing smoke down the backstretch. Aleshin rolled to a stop in turn three. While not as dominant as the Monday session, Andretti Autosport once again led the day, with Ryan Hunter-Reay setting the fastest lap at 228.202 mph (367.256 km/h). Josef Newgarden led the way in "no-tow" laps, turning a 224.541 mph (361.364 km/h) lap late in the session.

Top practice speeds
Pos	No.	Driver	Team	Engine/ aero kit	Speed
1	28	(United States) Ryan Hunter-Reay	Andretti Autosport	Honda	228.202
2	26	(Colombia) Carlos Muñoz	Andretti Autosport	Honda	228.066
3	12	(Australia) Will Power	Team Penske	Chevrolet	227.733
Official report

=== Thursday, May 19 ===
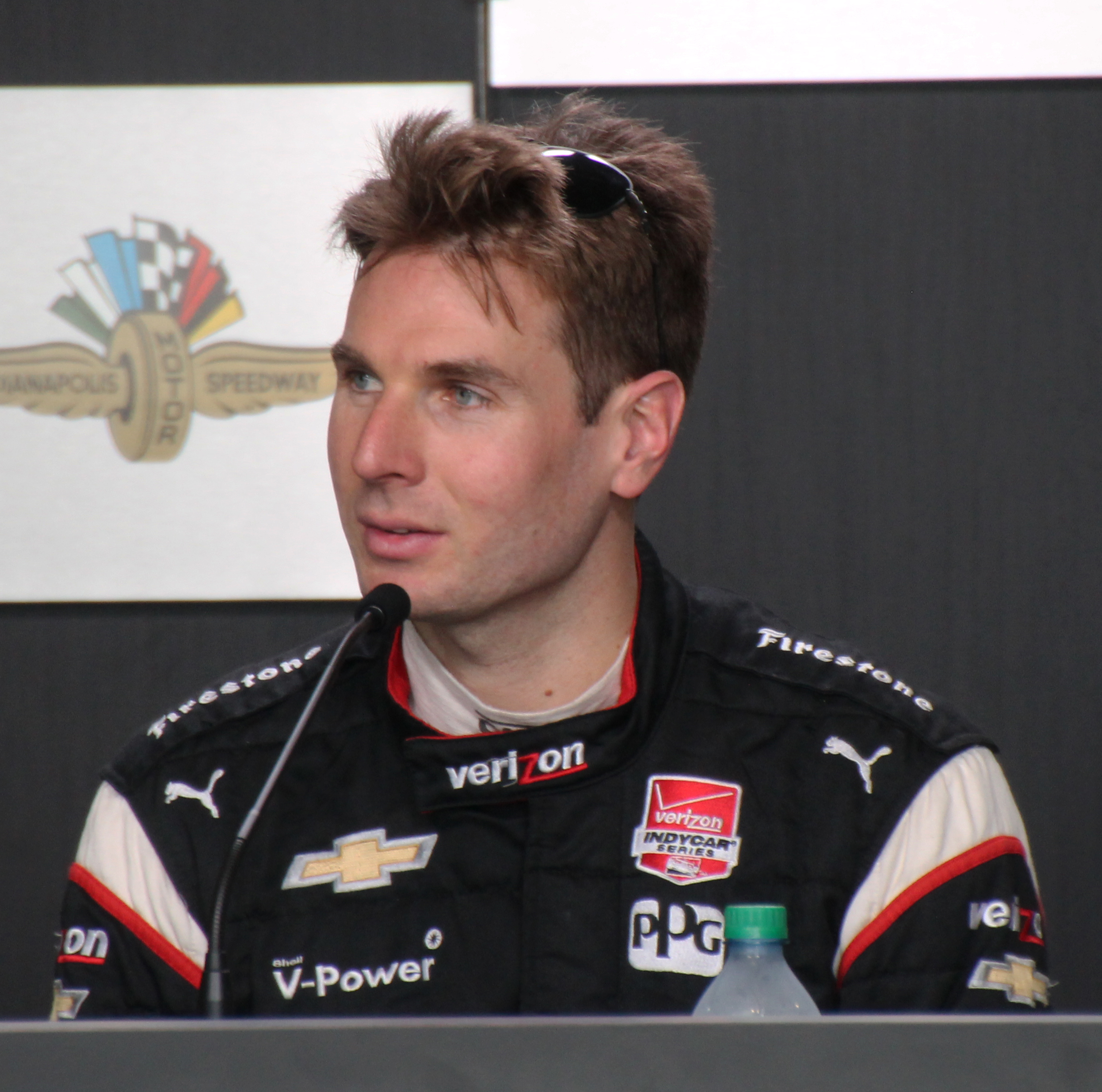
Will Power set the fastest "no-tow" lap on Thursday.

- Weather: 70 °F (21 °C), mostly sunny
- Practice summary: All 33 entries took to the track for practice, completing 2,563 laps. No major accidents occurred during the day, but mechanical failures again brought brief halts to practice. Just after 3:30 p.m., Juan Pablo Montoya rolled to a halt in turn three with no power to his car. Practice was halted while his car was towed in. At roughly 4:00 p.m., Ryan Hunter-Reay suffered an engine failure coming down the backstretch. Hunter-Reay brought the car to a halt at the exit of turn three. Dale Coyne Racing's Gabby Chaves became the first driver outside of the Andretti Autosport stable to lead a practice session, with a lap at 227.961 mph (366.868 km/h). Will Power led the "no-tow" rankings with a speed of 225.381 mph (362.716 km/h). After crashing on Wednesday, Spencer Pigot returned to the track in a back-up car for one "shake-down" lap just before the session ended.

Top practice speeds
Pos	No.	Driver	Team	Engine/ aero kit	Speed
1	19	(Colombia) Gabby Chaves	Dale Coyne Racing	Honda	227.961
2	29	(United States) Townsend Bell	Andretti Autosport	Honda	227.593
3	26	(Colombia) Carlos Muñoz	Andretti Autosport	Honda	227.589
Official report

=== Fast Friday — Friday, May 20 ===
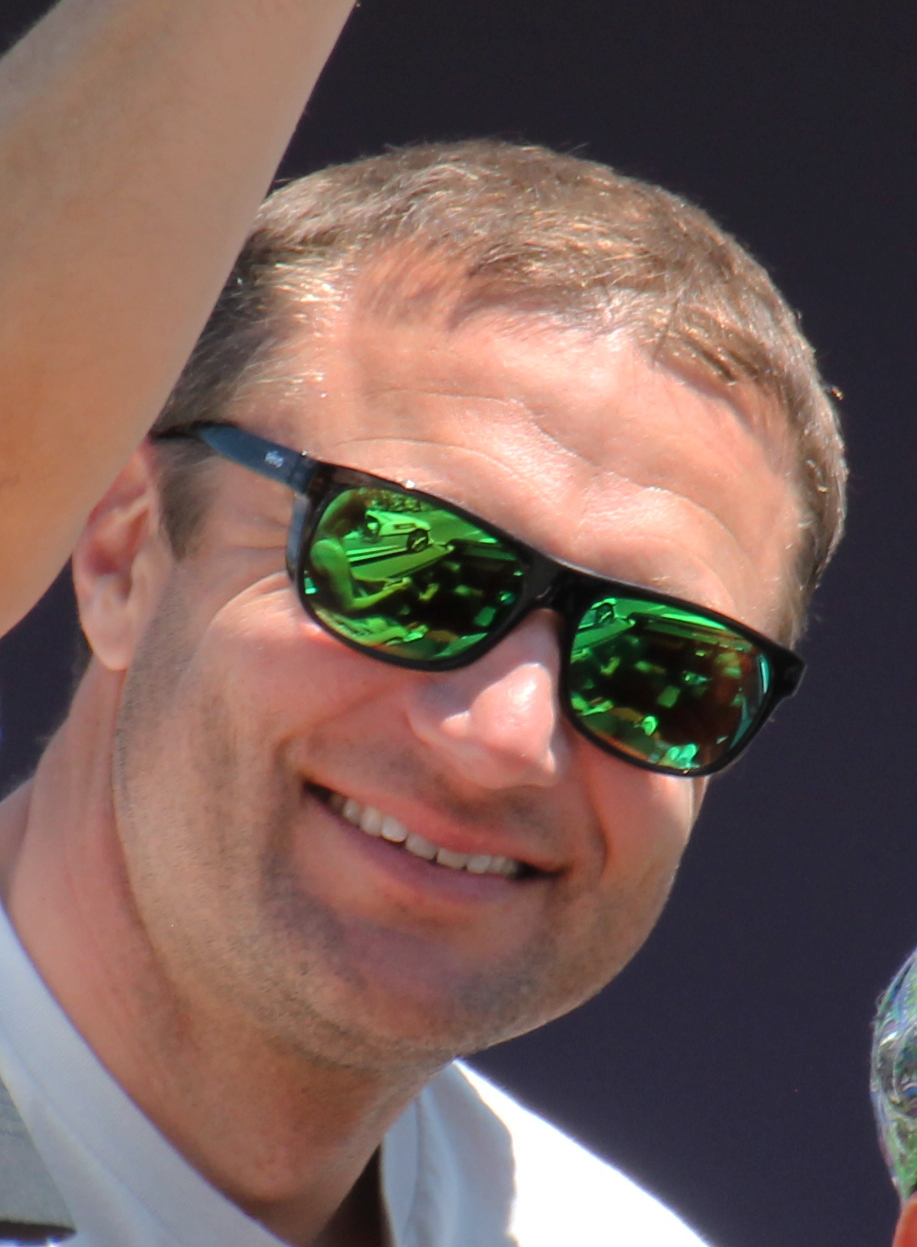
Townsend Bell set the fastest "no-tow" speed on Fast Friday.

- Weather: 67 °F (19 °C), overcast, rain late
- Practice summary: Turbocharger "boost" settings were increased from 130 kPa to 140 kPa for the "Fast Friday" practice session. At 12:30 p.m., Marco Andretti became the first driver of the week to break the 230 mph (370 km/h) barrier. Will Power set the fastest lap of the day 232.672 mph (374.449 km/h). Power also had a "no-tow" lap of 231.339 mph (372.304 km/h). At 4:05 p.m., the track was closed for about 45 minutes due to moisture from a brief, light rain shower. The track re-opened in time for the final "Happy Hour" session. At the end of the day, a total of fourteen drivers broke the 230 mph (370 km/h) barrier. Townsend Bell set the fastest "no-tow" lap of the day at 231.672 mph (372.840 km/h).

Top practice speeds
Pos	No.	Driver	Team	Engine/ aero kit	Speed
1	12	(Australia) Will Power	Team Penske	Chevrolet	232.672
2	21	(United States) Josef Newgarden	Ed Carpenter Racing	Chevrolet	232.344
3	5	(Canada) James Hinchcliffe	Schmidt Peterson Motorsports	Honda	231.972
Official report

== Time trials ==
=== First Day — Saturday, May 21 ===
- Weather: 73 °F (23 °C), partly cloudy early, mostly sunny late

Morning rain delayed the start of practice until 12:30 p.m. Six minutes into the practice session, Max Chilton spun in turn two and crashed into the outside wall. He was not seriously injured. Alexander Rossi set the fastest lap of the practice session at 231.249 mph (372.159 km/h). Officials announced that time trials would be extended to 7 p.m., to account for lost track time due to the moisture and weepers. The top nine qualifiers for the day would be locked in, and advance to the Top Nine Shootout on Sunday. The drivers for positions 10-33 would also be determined, but the actual starting positions will not set until Sunday.

Qualifying began at 2:15 p.m. Tony Kanaan was the first driver to complete an attempt. The early qualifiers were led by Josef Newgarden (230.229 mph (370.518 km/h)), who tentatively took the top spot of the qualifying chart. Rising track temperatures, and wind gusts in turn one, were making qualifying runs challenging for drivers. About an hour later, at 3:40 p.m., Townsend Bell upped the speed to 230.452 mph (370.877 km/h), and took over the top spot.

At 4:24 p.m., Pippa Mann was on her qualifying run, when a rear wing end fence failed. The car broke into a spin in turn two, scrubbed off speed, and tagged the outside wall twice. It came to rest against the inside wall. The car suffered moderate damage, and Mann was not injured. The track stood mostly quiet over the next hour, as teams awaited better track conditions, and waited to see who would make the first move to re-qualify.

At 5:52 p.m., Mikhail Aleshin was the first car to get in line to re-qualify, and improved on his earlier speed. Within moments, teams up and down the pit lane began scrambling to get into the qualifying line. Teams could elect to get into one of two lines. The normal qualifying allowed drivers an opportunity to re-qualify, but if they did not improve, they could revert to the earlier speed. The "fast track" line allowed drivers to move directly to the front of the queue, but at the expense of withdrawing their earlier speed. Hélio Castroneves set the tone for the final hour, moving to position 1 with a speed of 230.500 mph (370.954 km/h). Not to be upstaged, James Hinchcliffe went even faster (230.946 mph (371.672 km/h)). In the final minutes, Marco Andretti made a last-ditch effort to make the Fast Nine. With seven minutes left, Andretti bumped out his teammate Ryan Hunter-Reay. Hunter-Reay answered, putting himself second, and bumping Andretti out of the Fast Nine. With just seconds left before the final gun, Mikhail Aleshin got out onto the track for one more run. Aleshin bumped his way into the top nine as time expired. All top nine qualifiers were over the 230 mph (370 km/h) barrier.

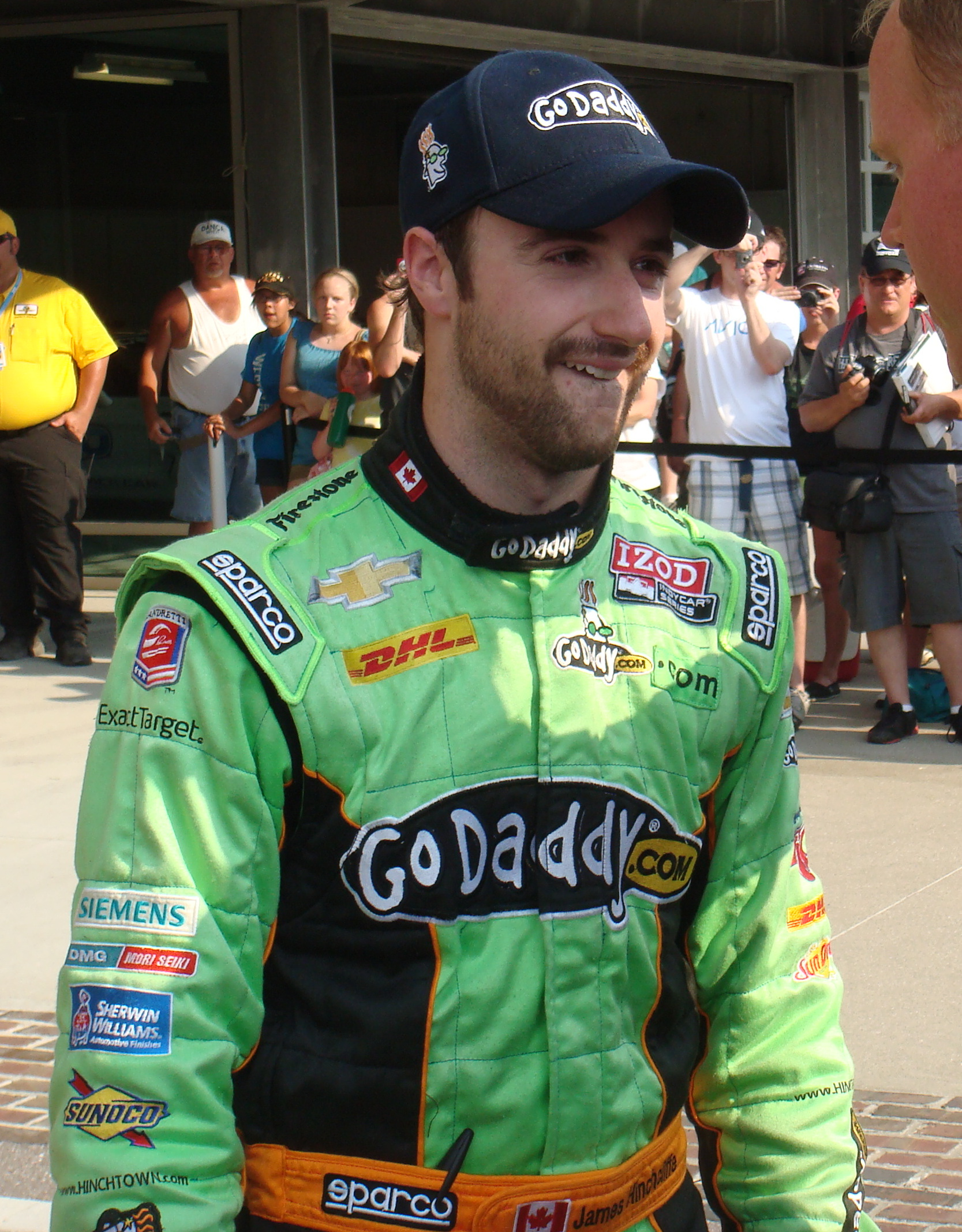
James Hinchcliffe set the fastest qualifying speed on Saturday May 21, and secured the pole position on Sunday May 22.

Saturday, May 21, 2016
Pos.	No.	Driver	Team	Engine/ aero kit	Speed
Fast Nine Qualifiers
1	5	(Canada) James Hinchcliffe	Schmidt Peterson Motorsports	Honda	230.946
2	28	(United States) Ryan Hunter-Reay	Andretti Autosport	Honda	230.805
3	12	(Australia) Will Power	Team Penske	Chevrolet	230.736
4	3	(Brazil) Hélio Castroneves	Team Penske	Chevrolet	230.500
5	29	(United States) Townsend Bell	Andretti Autosport	Honda	230.452
6	21	(United States) Josef Newgarden	Ed Carpenter Racing	Chevrolet	230.229
7	7	(Russia) Mikhail Aleshin	Schmidt Peterson Motorsports	Honda	230.209
8	26	(Colombia) Carlos Muñoz	Andretti Autosport	Honda	230.173
9	22	(France) Simon Pagenaud	Team Penske	Chevrolet	230.102
Positions 10–33
10	98	(United States) Alexander Rossi R	Andretti Herta Autosport w/ Curb-Agajanian	Honda	230.048
11	27	(United States) Marco Andretti	Andretti Autosport	Honda	230.037
12	2	(Colombia) Juan Pablo Montoya	Team Penske	Chevrolet	229.745
13	9	(New Zealand) Scott Dixon	Chip Ganassi Racing	Chevrolet	229.497
14	20	(United States) Ed Carpenter	Ed Carpenter Racing	Chevrolet	229.429
15	6	(United States) J. R. Hildebrand	Ed Carpenter Racing	Chevrolet	229.075
16	14	(Japan) Takuma Sato	A. J. Foyt Enterprises	Honda	228.096
17	18	(United States) Conor Daly	Dale Coyne Racing	Honda	227.862
18	24	(United States) Sage Karam	Dreyer & Reinbold Racing	Chevrolet	227.821
19	10	(Brazil) Tony Kanaan	Chip Ganassi Racing	Chevrolet	227.679
20	11	(France) Sébastien Bourdais	KVSH Racing	Chevrolet	227.442
21	15	(United States) Graham Rahal	Rahal Letterman Lanigan Racing	Honda	227.437
22	88	(United States) Bryan Clauson	Jonathan Byrd's Racing	Honda	227.110
23	16	(United States) Spencer Pigot R	Rahal Letterman Lanigan Racing	Honda	227.100
24	77	(Spain) Oriol Servià	Schmidt Peterson Motorsports	Honda	226.893
25	42	(United States) Charlie Kimball	Chip Ganassi Racing	Chevrolet	226.549
26	61	(Australia) Matthew Brabham R	PIRTEK Team Murray	Chevrolet	226.390
27	25	(United Kingdom) Stefan Wilson R	KVSH Racing	Chevrolet	225.560
28	41	(United Kingdom) Jack Hawksworth	A. J. Foyt Enterprises	Honda	225.388
29	35	(Canada) Alex Tagliani	A. J. Foyt Enterprises	Honda	224.507
30	4	(United States) Buddy Lazier	Lazier Burns Racing	Chevrolet	224.341
31	8	(United Kingdom) Max Chilton R	Chip Ganassi Racing	Chevrolet	No time
32	19	(Colombia) Gabby Chaves	Dale Coyne Racing	Honda	Wave off
33	63	(United Kingdom) Pippa Mann	Dale Coyne Racing	Honda	Crash
Official report

=== Second Day — Sunday, May 22 ===
- Weather: 81 °F (27 °C), mostly sunny

Pole Day qualification saw warmer temperatures than the previous day's trials with roughly the same amount of wind, resulting in lower speeds and an even slicker track. Qualifications began with the determining of positions 10 through 33. Early in the session, Alex Tagliani lost control of his car, hit the outside wall, then slid back across the track and tapped the pit lane attenuator with the nose of his car. Tagliani was uninjured, but the crash forced him to start in last place. Later in the session, a minor incident occurred where a trash bag blew onto the course in the middle of Juan Pablo Montoya's run. Montoya ran over the trash bag, causing a massive loss in downforce for the remainder of the run. IndyCar officials allowed Montoya to retry his run due to the circumstances. The 10-33 position session was topped by Schmidt Peterson Motorsports Oriol Servià with a speed of 229.060 mph (368.636 km/h). Marco Andretti, who was one of the fastest cars during the week, was hampered in his run due a broken fifth gear, relegating him to a 14th place start.

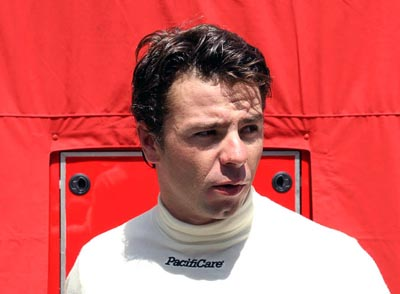
Oriol Servià led the Group One "10-33" qualifying session.

Sunday, May 22, 2016
Positions 10–33
Pos.	No.	Driver	Team	Engine/ aero kit	Speed
10	77	(Spain) Oriol Servià	Schmidt Peterson Motorsports	Honda	229.060
11	98	(United States) Alexander Rossi R	Andretti Herta Autosport	Honda	228.473
12	14	(Japan) Takuma Sato	A. J. Foyt Enterprises	Honda	228.029
13	9	(New Zealand) Scott Dixon	Chip Ganassi Racing	Chevrolet	227.991
14	27	(United States) Marco Andretti	Andretti Autosport	Honda	227.969
15	6	(United States) J. R. Hildebrand	Ed Carpenter Racing	Chevrolet	227.876
16	42	(United States) Charlie Kimball	Chip Ganassi Racing	Chevrolet	227.822
17	2	(Colombia) Juan Pablo Montoya	Team Penske	Chevrolet	227.684
18	10	(Brazil) Tony Kanaan	Chip Ganassi Racing	Chevrolet	227.430
19	11	(France) Sébastien Bourdais	KVSH Racing	Chevrolet	227.428
20	20	(United States) Ed Carpenter	Ed Carpenter Racing	Chevrolet	227.226
21	19	(Colombia) Gabby Chaves	Dale Coyne Racing	Honda	227.192
22	8	(United Kingdom) Max Chilton R	Chip Ganassi Racing	Chevrolet	226.686
23	24	(United States) Sage Karam	Dreyer & Reinbold Racing	Chevrolet	226.436
24	18	(United States) Conor Daly	Dale Coyne Racing	Honda	226.312
25	63	(United Kingdom) Pippa Mann	Dale Coyne Racing	Honda	226.006
26	15	(United States) Graham Rahal	Rahal Letterman Lanigan Racing	Honda	225.847
27	61	(Australia) Matthew Brabham R	PIRTEK Team Murray	Chevrolet	225.727
28	88	(United States) Bryan Clauson	Jonathan Byrd's Racing	Honda	225.266
29	16	(United States) Spencer Pigot R	Rahal Letterman Lanigan Racing	Honda	224.847
30	25	(United Kingdom) Stefan Wilson R	KVSH Racing	Chevrolet	224.602
31	41	(United Kingdom) Jack Hawksworth	A. J. Foyt Enterprises	Honda	224.596
32	4	(United States) Buddy Lazier	Lazier Burns Racing	Chevrolet	222.154
33	35	(Canada) Alex Tagliani	A. J. Foyt Enterprises	Honda	Crash

Fast Nine qualifying began shortly after the final run from the first group. Josef Newgarden held the fastest time for much of the session with a speed of 230.700 mph (371.276 km/h). However, his time was beat at the last moment by the final qualifier of the day, James Hinchcliffe, who went just fast enough to best Newgarden with a speed of 230.760 mph (371.372 km/h). Hinchcliffe's pole came one year after his near fatal accident during practice for the previous years running of the race. The pole also marked Schmidt Peterson Motorsports first pole position at Indianapolis since Alex Tagliani won pole in 2011.

Fast Nine
Pos.	No.	Driver	Team	Engine/ aero kit	Speed
1	5	(Canada) James Hinchcliffe	Schmidt Peterson Motorsports	Honda	230.760
2	21	(United States) Josef Newgarden	Ed Carpenter Racing	Chevrolet	230.700
3	28	(United States) Ryan Hunter-Reay	Andretti Autosport	Honda	230.648
4	29	(United States) Townsend Bell	Andretti Autosport	Honda	230.481
5	26	(Colombia) Carlos Muñoz	Andretti Autosport	Honda	230.287
6	12	(Australia) Will Power	Team Penske	Chevrolet	229.669
7	7	(Russia) Mikhail Aleshin	Schmidt Peterson Motorsports	Honda	229.562
8	22	(France) Simon Pagenaud	Team Penske	Chevrolet	229.139
9	3	(Brazil) Hélio Castroneves	Team Penske	Chevrolet	229.115
Official report

== Post-qualifying practice ==
=== Monday, May 23 ===
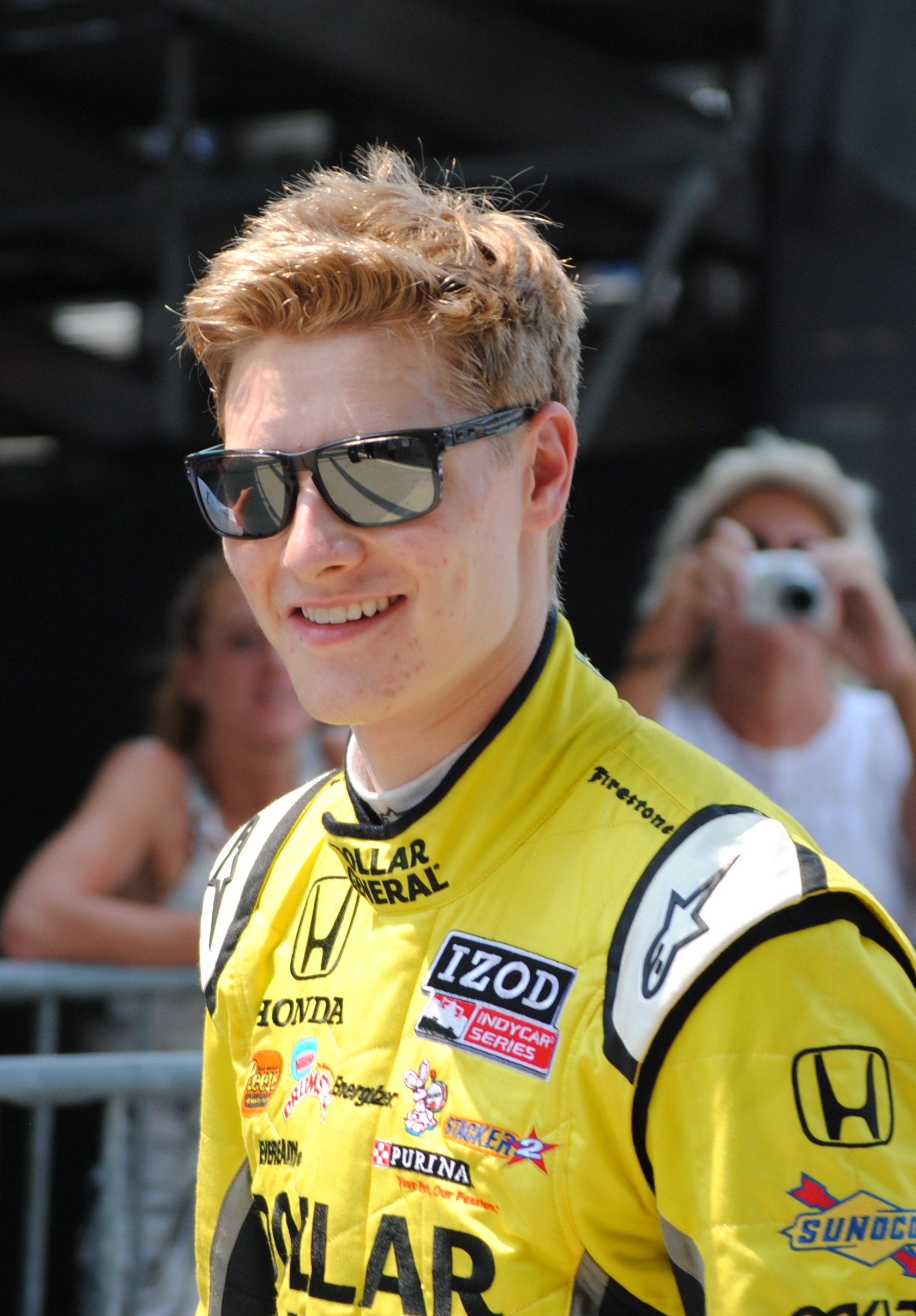
Josef Newgarden went fastest in post-qualifying practice.

- Weather: 77 °F (25 °C), sunny

Post-qualifying practice was scheduled on Monday, May 23. The session was scheduled only until 4:00 p.m. to allow practice for Indy Lights later in the day. The teams converted their cars back to race setups and boost was reduced back to race day levels. All 33 cars appeared on track, mainly participating in drafting and race simulations. One incident occurred during the day just after 3:10 p.m., when fire erupted from the left rear on the car of Jack Hawksworth. Hawksworth emerged from the car quickly. Despite the shortened session, more laps were turned during the day than any other practice session prior, with a total of 2886 laps. Chevrolet cars took the first four spots in the speed charts for the day, with Josef Newgarden running the fastest lap at 227.414 mph (365.987 km/h).

Top practice speeds
Pos	No.	Driver	Team	Engine/ aero kit	Speed
1	21	(United States) Josef Newgarden	Ed Carpenter Racing	Chevrolet	227.414
2	10	(Brazil) Tony Kanaan	Chip Ganassi Racing	Chevrolet	226.393
3	9	(New Zealand) Scott Dixon	Chip Ganassi Racing	Chevrolet	226.339
Official report

== Carb Day ==
=== Practice — Friday, May 27 ===
- Weather: 85 °F (29 °C), partly cloudy

Carb day practice was scheduled Friday, May 27. Practice was only scheduled for 70 minutes to allow for other events later in the day. The day also turned out to be the warmest practice session of the month. One incident occurred during the day when Pippa Mann slapped the wall coming off of turn four early in the session. Tony Kanaan set the fastest time of the day at 226.280 mph (364.162 km/h).

Top practice speeds
Pos	No.	Driver	Team	Engine/ aero kit	Speed
1	10	(Brazil) Tony Kanaan	Chip Ganassi Racing	Chevrolet	226.280
2	26	(Colombia) Carlos Muñoz	Andretti Autosport	Honda	224.772
3	9	(New Zealand) Scott Dixon	Chip Ganassi Racing	Chevrolet	224.606
Official report

=== Pit Stop Challenge ===
The 39th annual Pit Stop Challenge was held Friday May 27. A total of twelve drivers/teams qualified. Penske Racing with driver Hélio Castroneves defeated Schmidt Peterson Motorsports (Mikhail Aleshin) in the final round to win the annual tournament. It was Penske's 16th win in the Pit Stop contest, and the 7th win individually for Castroneves, both records.

First Round
28	Ryan Hunter-Reay (Andretti Autosport)
61	Matthew Brabham (Pirtek Team Murray)
15	Graham Rahal (RLLR)	12.682
42	Charlie Kimball (Ganassi)	13.991
26	Carlos Muñoz (Andretti Autosport)	13.106
24	Sage Karam (Dreyer & Reinbold)	13.789
7	Mikhail Aleshin (Schmidt Petersen)	12.578
14	Takuma Sato (Foyt Racing)	14.098

Quarterfinals
5	James Hinchcliffe (Schmidt Petersen)	13.988
28	Ryan Hunter-Reay (Andretti Autosport)	12.877
3	Hélio Castroneves (Team Penske)	12.332
15	Graham Rahal (Rahal Letterman)	12.769
2	Juan Pablo Montoya (Team Penske)	21.648
26	Carlos Muñoz (Andretti Autosport)	16.998
9	Scott Dixon (Ganassi)	12.970
7	Mikhail Aleshin (Schmidt Petersen)	12.883

Semifinals
28	Ryan Hunter-Reay (Andretti Autosport)	12.989
3	Hélio Castroneves (Team Penske)	12.610
26	Carlos Muñoz (Andretti Autosport)	13.499
7	Mikhail Aleshin (Schmidt Petersen)	12.833

Finals
3	Hélio Castroneves (Team Penske)	12.235
7	Mikhail Aleshin (Schmidt Petersen)	19.381

== Starting grid ==
(R) = Indianapolis 500 rookie; (W) = Former Indianapolis 500 winner

Row	Inside		Middle		Outside	
1	5	(Canada) James Hinchcliffe	21	(United States) Josef Newgarden	28	(United States) Ryan Hunter-Reay (W)
2	29	(United States) Townsend Bell	26	(Colombia) Carlos Muñoz	12	(Australia) Will Power
3	7	(Russia) Mikhail Aleshin	22	(France) Simon Pagenaud	3	(Brazil) Hélio Castroneves (W)
4	77	(Spain) Oriol Servià	98	(United States) Alexander Rossi (R)	14	(Japan) Takuma Sato
5	9	(New Zealand) Scott Dixon (W)	27	(United States) Marco Andretti	6	(United States) J. R. Hildebrand
6	42	(United States) Charlie Kimball	2	(Colombia) Juan Pablo Montoya (W)	10	(Brazil) Tony Kanaan (W)
7	11	(France) Sébastien Bourdais	20	(United States) Ed Carpenter	19	(Colombia) Gabby Chaves
8	8	(United Kingdom) Max Chilton (R)	24	(United States) Sage Karam	18	(United States) Conor Daly
9	63	(United Kingdom) Pippa Mann	15	(United States) Graham Rahal	61	(Australia) Matthew Brabham (R)
10	88	(United States) Bryan Clauson	16	(United States) Spencer Pigot (R)	25	(United Kingdom) Stefan Wilson (R)
11	41	(United Kingdom) Jack Hawksworth	4	(United States) Buddy Lazier (W)	35	(Canada) Alex Tagliani

== Race ==
=== First half ===
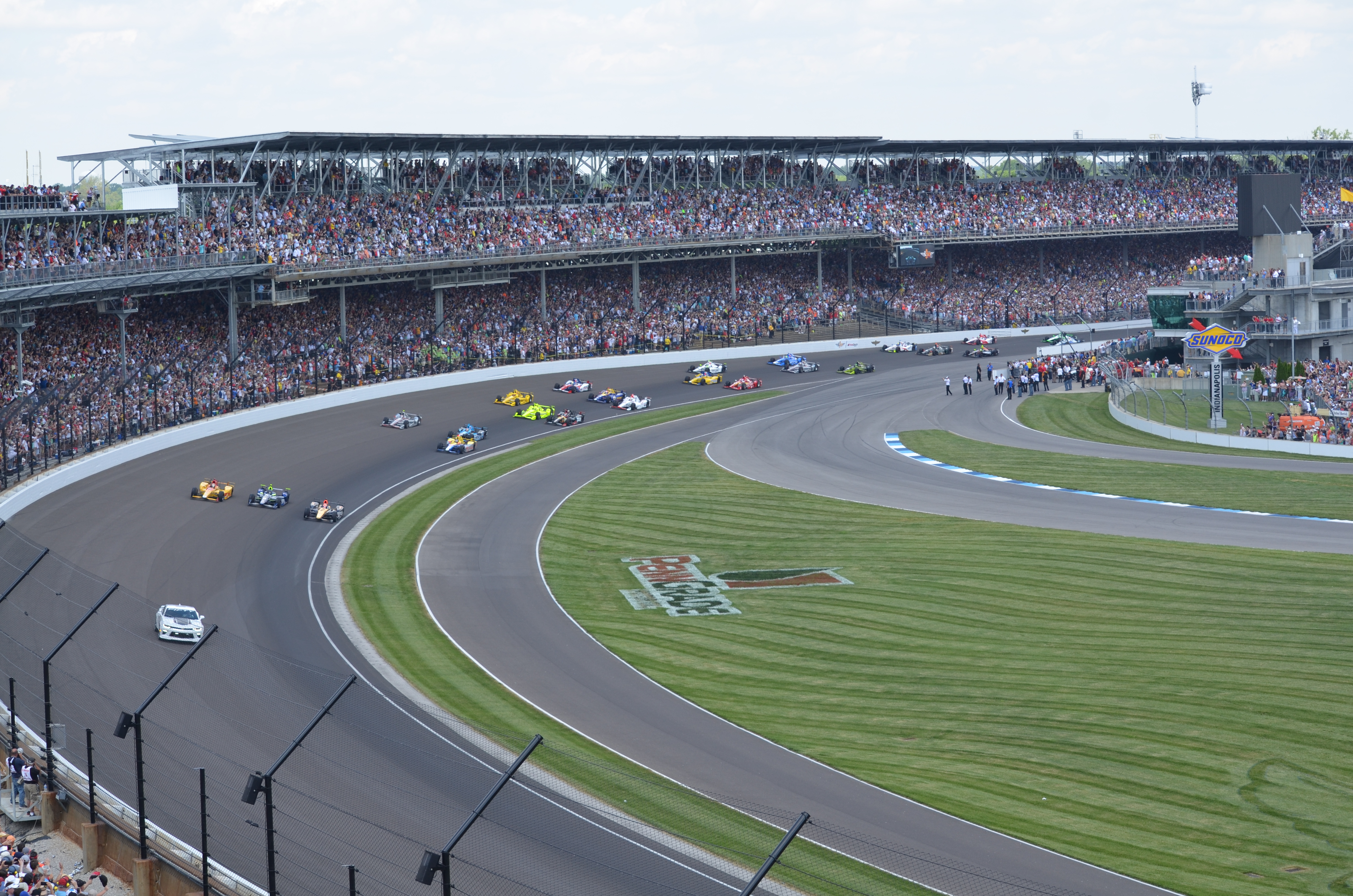
The field in turn one on the pace lap

Raceday featured partly cloudy skies and temperatures in the low 80 °F (27 °C) range. Hélio Castroneves had a small issue getting his car started, but quickly resumed his place on the grid. During the first parade lap, smoke began to come from underneath the car of Buddy Lazier, stemming from what was later reported to be a stuck throttle. Lazier would not return to the race until roughly a quarter of the way through.

==== Start ====
Pole starter James Hinchcliffe led the field into the first turn, but was passed on the backstretch by Ryan Hunter-Reay, who led the first lap of the race. From here, the first quarter of the race became a three-way battle for the lead between Hunter-Reay, Hinchcliffe, and Josef Newgarden. The first round of pit stops occurred during this time, which served to spread out the field and separate the leaders from the rest of the pack. They also allowed for Townsend Bell to join in on the battle for the lead. On lap 47, the first caution of the day flew for debris on the backstretch. During the ensuing pit stops, an incident occurred when Will Power pushed Tony Kanaan against the pit lane wall while exiting his own pit stall. Power was penalized for the incident (Unsafe Pit Exit Release) and sent to the rear of the field.

==== Second quarter ====
Green flag racing resumed on lap 54 with Ryan Hunter-Reay in the lead. The battle between him and James Hinchcliffe resumed with the two swapping the lead regularly. The battle was interrupted on lap 64 when defending champion Juan Pablo Montoya lost control of his car in turn two and hit the outside wall. This marked the first time that Montoya failed to finish an Indy 500. Pit stops again occurred during this yellow. A second pit lane incident occurred when Simon Pagenaud, who had been running well up in the field, bumped into the car of Mikhail Aleshin while leaving his pit box. Pagenaud, just as his teammate Will Power, was sent to the back of the field for the incident (Unsafe Pit Exit Release). During the pit stop sequence, Will Power elected to stay out, giving him the lead.

The race was attempted to be resumed on lap 71, but reports of moisture briefly delayed the restart. The race went back green on lap 74, where Will Power was quickly shuffled back by James Hinchcliffe and Ryan Hunter-Reay, who once again resumed their duel for the lead. At roughly lap 90, Hélio Castroneves joined the leading group and inherited the lead for the first time on lap 92. The third caution of the day came out just laps later on lap 94, when Sage Karam went wide while trying to pass Townsend Bell and slapped the wall in turn one. Karam's car slid against the wall all the way to the backstretch. Pit stops occurred during the yellow with no major incidents. Bryan Clauson stayed out to lead three laps during this yellow before making his own stop, promoting Castroneves back into the lead. Also during this yellow, Simon Pagenaud began to report that the engine in his car had started to misfire, effectively ending his chances of winning the race.

=== Second half ===
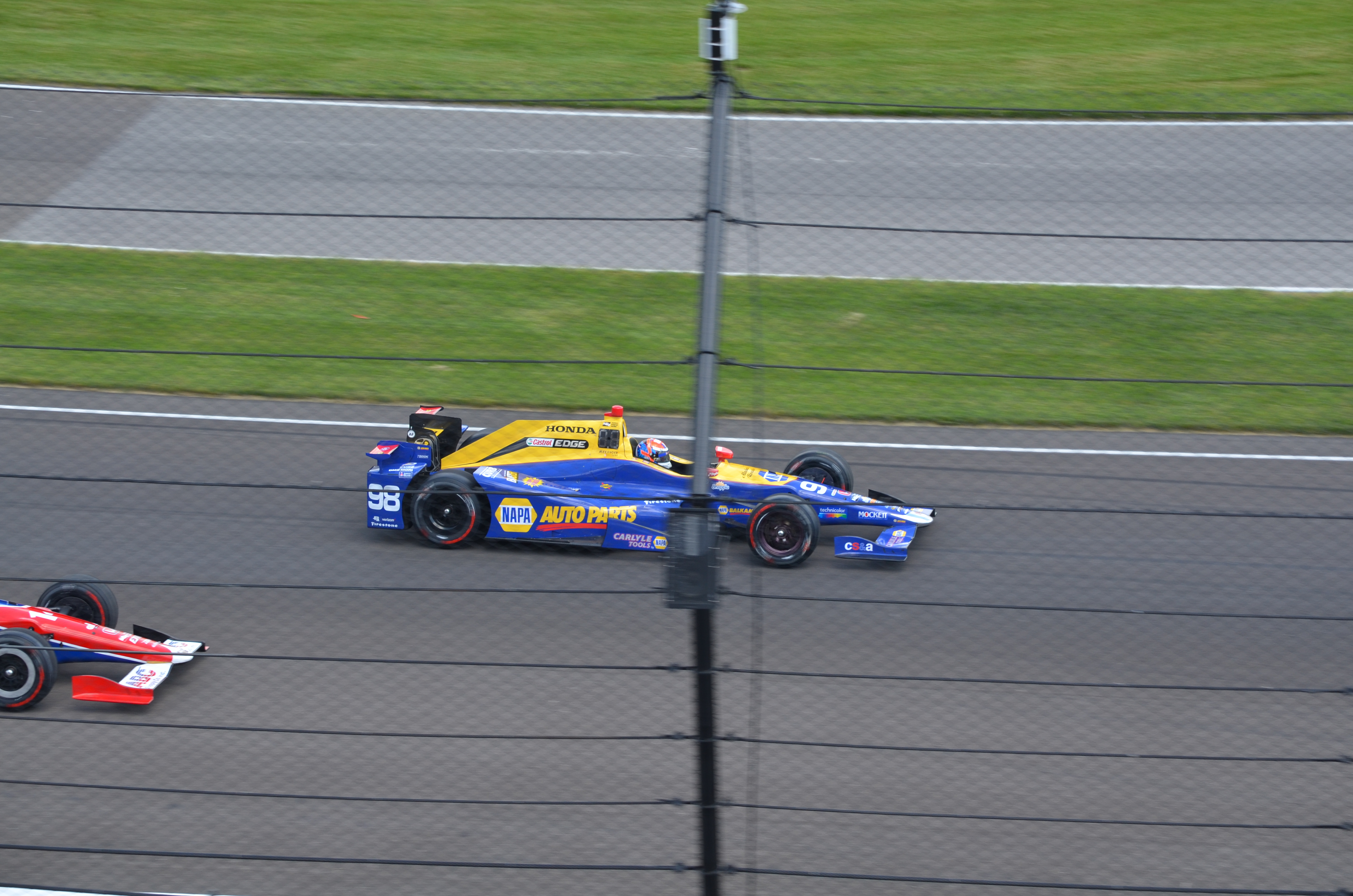
Alexander Rossi

==== Halfway ====
The green flag came out again on lap 104. Hélio Castroneves led for the opening few laps after the restart, but soon fell behind Ryan Hunter-Reay, Townsend Bell, and Tony Kanaan. These three would fight for the lead for the next several laps, swapping positions regularly. On lap 115, the 4th caution period of the race occurred when the rear suspension on the car of Mikhail Aleshin broke, sending him spinning into the turn one wall. Conor Daly was also collected in the incident after spinning in an attempt to avoid Aleshin's car. Daly retired from the race due to the incident, while Aleshin would eventually return after many laps of repair.

Yellow flag pit stops during this caution period brought one of the most pivotal moments of the race. As cars exited the pits, previous race leader Townsend Bell attempting to gain position contacted with Hélio Castroneves, sending Bell into a spin that collected Ryan Hunter-Reay. Bell and Hunter-Reay would both fall off the lead lap due to the incident, while Castroneves was not greatly affected. During these pit stops, Alex Tagliani and Alexander Rossi elected not to pit, putting them off sequence from the rest of the field.

Racing resumed on lap 121 with Alex Tagliani in the lead. Alex Tagliani matched a record set by Tom Sneva in the 1980 race and became the second driver in Indy 500 history to start last and lead laps during the race.

The battle for the lead became a battle between Tagliani and Alexander Rossi for roughly 15 laps, before both drivers had to come in for their own pit stops. This handed the battle for the lead back to Hélio Castroneves and Tony Kanaan. On lap 149, Castroneves and Kanaan appeared to be leading what would be another round of green flag pit stops. However, just as both reached their pit boxes, the fifth caution of the day occurred when a tire from Buddy Lazier's car came off the car and onto the race surface in turn two. Lazier would retire from the race due to damage caused from trying to drive with only three wheels. Yellow flag pit stops would once again occur, cycling Castroneves and Kanaan back to the front of the field. Several cars would be sent to the rear of the field during this caution for entering a closed pit lane in order to have emergency fuel service.

==== Fourth quarter ====
Racing resumed on lap 158 with Hélio Castroneves in the lead, but Tony Kanaan took the lead almost immediately. A four-way battle for the lead ensued as Castroneves and Kaanan were joined by Josef Newgarden and James Hinchcliffe. On lap 161, Castroneves's chances of winning were dashed when J. R. Hildebrand clipped the left rear bumper pod on Castroneves's car, forcing him to the pit to make repairs. Castroneves caught a small break, though, when the sixth and final caution of the race flew just two laps later after Takuma Sato hit the outside wall at the exit of turn four. Believing all cars would need to stop again, most drivers made yellow flag pit stops.

The green flag flew once again on lap 167. The battle for the lead became a three way duel between Tony Kanaan, Josef Newgarden, and Carlos Muñoz. J. R. Hildebrand also ran in the lead group, but was off sequence in pit stop strategy and came in much earlier than anyone else.

==== Finish ====
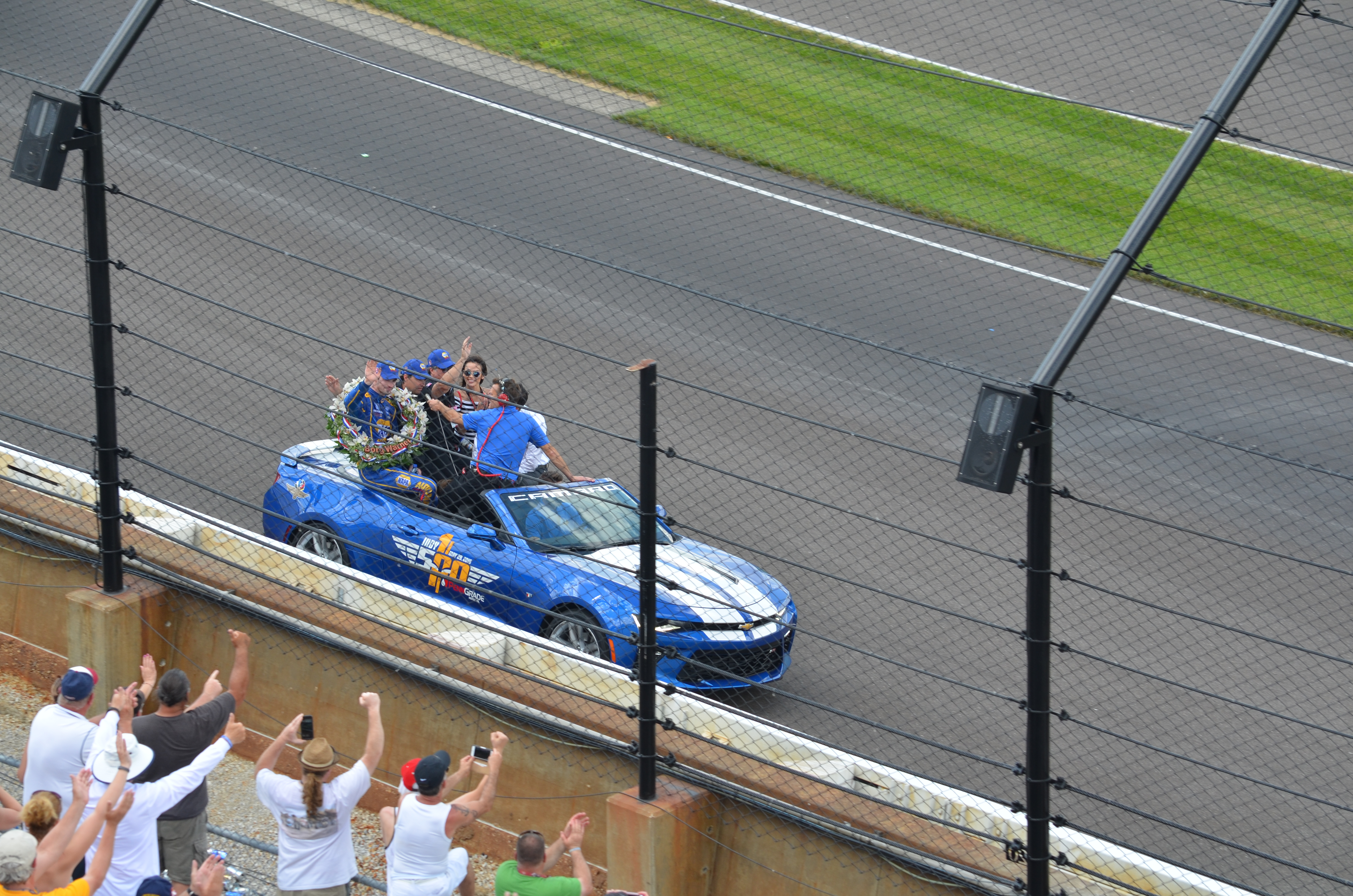
Race winner Alexander Rossi

With 10 laps to go, it became apparent that the leaders would need a splash of fuel to get the cars to the end of the race. Of the leading group, Tony Kanaan would be the first to pit, followed by Josef Newgarden a few laps later, and finally Carlos Muñoz with five laps to go. It appeared the winner would be the driver with the best pit stop.

When Muñoz made his stop, the lead of the race passed to Alexander Rossi, who had been 10th at the time of the previous restart. With the guidance of Bryan Herta, Rossi attempted to gamble on fuel and finish the race without another pit stop. With two laps to go, Rossi began to slow considerably in order to bring the car to the finish. As the white flag fell, Rossi held a lead of over 20 seconds. Despite running a final lap at less than 180 mph (290 km/h) and coasting from turn 4 to the finish line, Rossi was able to hang on to win by roughly 4.5 seconds over his teammate Carlos Muñoz. Rossi was the first rookie to win the Indianapolis 500 since 2001 when Hélio Castroneves took victory in his first attempt. Rossi would eventually run out of fuel on the cool-down lap, requiring his car to be towed into Victory Lane.

== Box score ==
Pos	No.	Driver	Team	Engine/aero kit	Laps	Time/retired	Pit stops	Grid	Pts.^{1}
1	98	(United States) Alexander Rossi R	Andretti Herta Autosport w/ Curb-Agajanian	Honda	200	166.634 mph	8	11	124
2	26	(Colombia) Carlos Muñoz	Andretti Autosport	Honda	200	+4.4975	8	5	115
3	21	(United States) Josef Newgarden	Ed Carpenter Racing	Chevrolet	200	+4.9304	8	2	111
4	10	(Brazil) Tony Kanaan W	Chip Ganassi Racing	Chevrolet	200	+10.4963	8	18	81
5	42	(United States) Charlie Kimball	Chip Ganassi Racing	Chevrolet	200	+10.5218	9	16	78
6	6	(United States) J. R. Hildebrand	Ed Carpenter Racing	Chevrolet	200	+11.3459	7	15	76
7	5	(Canada) James Hinchcliffe	Schmidt Peterson Motorsports	Honda	200	+12.7744	8	1	95
8	9	(New Zealand) Scott Dixon W	Chip Ganassi Racing	Chevrolet	200	+15.1607	8	13	69
9	11	(France) Sébastien Bourdais	KVSH Racing	Chevrolet	200	+21.0613	9	19	59
10	12	(Australia) Will Power	Team Penske	Chevrolet	200	+21.5171	8	6	73
11	3	(Brazil) Hélio Castroneves W	Team Penske	Chevrolet	200	+22.1015	9	9	65
12	77	(Spain) Oriol Servià	Schmidt Peterson Motorsports	Honda	200	+23.8140	9	10	60
13	27	(United States) Marco Andretti	Andretti Autosport	Honda	200	+24.9700	9	14	54
14	15	(United States) Graham Rahal	Rahal Letterman Lanigan Racing	Honda	200	+28.2494	9	26	40
15	8	(United Kingdom) Max Chilton R	Chip Ganassi Racing	Chevrolet	200	+28.7589	10	22	42
16	41	(United Kingdom) Jack Hawksworth	A. J. Foyt Enterprises	Honda	200	+32.1748	9	31	31
17	35	(Canada) Alex Tagliani	A. J. Foyt Enterprises	Honda	200	+32.1993	7	33	28
18	63	(United Kingdom) Pippa Mann	Dale Coyne Racing	Honda	199	-1 Lap	8	25	33
19	22	(France) Simon Pagenaud	Team Penske	Chevrolet	199	-1 Lap	10	8	50
20	19	(Colombia) Gabby Chaves	Dale Coyne Racing	Honda	199	-1 Lap	11	21	33
21	29	(United States) Townsend Bell	Andretti Autosport	Honda	199	-1 Lap	11	4	55
22	61	(Australia) Matthew Brabham R	PIRTEK Team Murray	Chevrolet	199	-1 Lap	8	27	23
23	88	(United States) Bryan Clauson	Jonathan Byrd's Racing	Honda	198	-2 Laps	10	28	21
24	28	(United States) Ryan Hunter-Reay W	Andretti Autosport	Honda	198	-2 Laps	8	3	53
25	16	(United States) Spencer Pigot R	Rahal Letterman Lanigan Racing	Honda	195	-5 Laps	8	29	15
26	14	(Japan) Takuma Sato	A. J. Foyt Enterprises	Honda	163	Contact	6	12	32
27	7	(Russia) Mikhail Aleshin	Schmidt Peterson Motorsports	Honda	126	Contact	5	7	40
28	25	(United Kingdom) Stefan Wilson R	KVSH Racing	Chevrolet	119	Electrical	6	30	14
29	18	(United States) Conor Daly	Dale Coyne Racing	Honda	115	Contact	4	24	20
30	4	(United States) Buddy Lazier W	Lazier Burns Racing	Chevrolet	100	Mechanical	6	32	12
31	20	(United States) Ed Carpenter	Ed Carpenter Racing	Chevrolet	98	Mechanical	5	20	24
32	24	(United States) Sage Karam	Dreyer & Reinbold Racing	Chevrolet	93	Contact	3	23	22
33	2	(Colombia) Juan Pablo Montoya W	Team Penske	Chevrolet	63	Contact	2	17	27
OFFICIAL BOX SCORE

W Former Indianapolis 500 winner

R Indianapolis 500 Rookie

All entrants utilized Firestone tires.

^{1} Points include qualification points from Time Trials, 1 point for leading a lap, and 2 points for most laps led.

=== Race statistics ===
Lap leaders
Laps	Leader
1–2	Ryan Hunter-Reay
3	James Hinchcliffe
4	Ryan Hunter-Reay
5	James Hinchcliffe
6–8	Ryan Hunter-Reay
9	James Hinchcliffe
10	Ryan Hunter-Reay
11	James Hinchcliffe
12–13	Ryan Hunter-Reay
14–16	James Hinchcliffe
17	Ryan Hunter-Reay
18–23	James Hinchcliffe
24–27	Ryan Hunter-Reay
28–29	Josef Newgarden
30	Carlos Muñoz
31–32	Sage Karam
33–41	Ryan Hunter-Reay
42–48	Townsend Bell
49–56	Ryan Hunter-Reay
57	Townsend Bell
58	Ryan Hunter-Reay
59–60	James Hinchcliffe
61–66	Ryan Hunter-Reay
67–74	Will Power
75–77	James Hinchcliffe
78–80	Ryan Hunter-Reay
81–84	James Hinchcliffe
85–87	Ryan Hunter-Reay

Lap leaders (con't)
Laps	Leader
88–91	James Hinchcliffe
92–96	Hélio Castroneves
97–99	Bryan Clauson
100–103	Hélio Castroneves
104–108	Ryan Hunter-Reay
109	Tony Kanaan
110–112	Ryan Hunter-Reay
113–116	Townsend Bell
117–121	Alex Tagliani
122	Alexander Rossi
123–128	Alex Tagliani
129–137	Alexander Rossi
138–148	Hélio Castroneves
149–153	Carlos Muñoz
154–157	Hélio Castroneves
158–160	Tony Kanaan
161	James Hinchcliffe
162–163	Tony Kanaan
164–167	J. R. Hildebrand
168–178	Tony Kanaan
179–181	Josef Newgarden
182–183	Tony Kanaan
184–190	Josef Newgarden
191	Carlos Muñoz
192–193	Josef Newgarden
194–196	Carlos Muñoz
197–200	Alexander Rossi

Total laps led
Driver	Laps
Ryan Hunter-Reay	52
James Hinchcliffe	27
Hélio Castroneves	24
Tony Kanaan	19
Alexander Rossi	14
Josef Newgarden	14
Townsend Bell	12
Alex Tagliani	11
Carlos Muñoz	10
Will Power	8
J. R. Hildebrand	4
Bryan Clauson	3
Sage Karam	2

Cautions: 8 for 39 laps
Laps	Reason
47–53	Debris
64–74	Juan Pablo Montoya crash in turn 2
94–103	Sage Karam crash in turn 1
115–120	Aleshin, Daly crash in turn 2
150–157	Buddy Lazier lost wheel
163–166	Takuma Sato contact in turn 4

== Championship standings after the race ==
Drivers' Championship standings

	Pos	Driver	Points
	1	(France) Simon Pagenaud	292
	2	(New Zealand) Scott Dixon	235
1	3	(Brazil) Hélio Castroneves	224
7	4	(United States) Josef Newgarden	211
3	5	(Canada) James Hinchcliffe	205

Manufacturer standings

Pos	Manufacturer	Points
1	(United States) Chevrolet	500
2	(Japan) Honda	319

- Note: Only the top five positions are included.

== Broadcasting ==
=== Television ===
The Indianapolis 500 was broadcast live in the United States on ABC and streaming on WatchESPN and the ESPN app, called by Allen Bestwick, Scott Goodyear and Eddie Cheever. The broadcast utilized 100 television cameras, including 36 on-board cameras on twelve cars. Pre-race coverage began race morning with SportsCenter on the Road live at the Speedway with hosts Matt Barrie, Sara Walsh, Marty Smith and Ryan McGee.

On May 25, Speedway officials announced that all grandstand and general admission tickets had sold out. As a result, the local television blackout of the ABC network telecast was lifted for the first time since the race went to live "flag-to-flag" coverage in 1986. For Indianapolis viewers, it was the first time since 1950 that they were able to watch the race live on local television (the 1949 and 1950 races were broadcast locally on WFBM-TV, but Speedway officials barred live television coverage after 1950 out of fear that such broadcasts would cut into live attendance).

The race was also aired in Spanish through ABC's SAP channel in the United States and Puerto Rico and on ESPN in all of Latin America (except for Brazil), called by Andrés Agulla and Alex Pombo.

The race was also aired in Portuguese through the Band and BandSports channels in Brazil, called by Téo José and former IndyCar driver Felipe Giaffone.

ABC Television
Booth announcers	Pit/garage reporters
Host: Lindsay Czarniak; Announcer: Allen Bestwick; Color: Scott Goodyear; Color: Eddie Cheever	Jerry Punch; Jon Beekhuis; Rick DeBruhl; Marty Smith (pre-race)

=== Radio ===
The race was carried live by the IMS Radio Network, part of the Advanced Auto Parts IndyCar Radio Network. Paul Page announced his retirement from the crew, and handed over play-by-play duties to the new "Voice of the 500" Mark Jaynes. Page, and fellow former chief announcers Bob Jenkins, and Mike King, took part in the pre-race coverage. Page called the pace laps and the start of the race, then handed the call over to Jaynes for the completion of the first lap. Jenkins recorded commentary for the pre-race, then spent the day at his normal role on the public address announcing team. Page, as well as Mike King, visited the booth during the race and during the post-race for guest commentary. The pre-race coverage was extended from one hour to two hours, with the first hour celebrating the 100th running with recaps and highlights of past races.

With Jaynes moving from his long-time position in turn three (2000–2015) to the Pagoda booth, the announcing crew shuffled slightly from previous years. Jake Query, previously a pit reporter, and then the turn two reporter, took over the turn three position. Nick Yeoman, also previously a pit reporter, took over the turn two location. Historian Donald Davidson celebrated his 52nd year as a part of the broadcast, and Jerry Baker his 43rd. This was Baker's 29th year reporting from turn one, which is believed to be the second-longest tenure of any reporter in one of the turns - second only to Jim Shelton in turn four (32 years). Newcomer Rob Howden joined the crew in the pits. Dave Wilson returned to the crew, this time monitoring the race coverage and impressions on social media. No reporters were specifically assigned to the garage area and/or track medical center, but pit reporter Rob Howden made one roving report at each location.

During the broadcast, the commercial out-cues were recited by Jaynes, and the historical chief announcers (like 2009, 2011–2013). During commercial breaks, the classic Stark & Wetzel "whistle" jingle was also used, as well as a classic Stark & Wetzel commercial, reflecting the famous former sponsor of the network from the 1950s and 1960s. Sponsor guests included Mark Reuss (GM), Dale Herrigle (Firestone), James Verrier (BorgWarner), and Speedway president Doug Boles.

1070 The Fan broadcast nightly beginning May 2 with Trackside with Curt Cavin and Kevin Lee, followed by Donald Davidson's The Talk of Gasoline Alley.

Indianapolis Motor Speedway Radio Network
Booth announcers	Turn reporters	Pit/garage reporters	Color
Chief Announcer: Mark Jaynes; Driver expert: Davey Hamilton; Historian: Donald Davidson; Pre-race/Commentary: Paul Page	Turn 1: Jerry Baker; Turn 2: Nick Yeoman; Turn 3: Jake Query; Turn 4: Chris Denari	Rob Howden (north pits); Dave Furst (north-center pits); Kevin Lee (south-center pits); Michael Young (south pits)	Pre-race: Bob Jenkins; Guest commentary: Mike King; Social media: Dave Wilson

== Footnotes ==
Previous race: 2016 Angie's List Grand Prix of Indianapolis	IndyCar Series; 2016 season	Next race: 2016 Chevrolet Indy Dual in Detroit
Previous race: 2015 Indianapolis 500	Indianapolis 500	Next race: 2017 Indianapolis 500
