= Silas Miller =

American politician

Member of the Kansas Senate from the 25th district
- Incumbent
- Assumed office December 22, 2025
- Preceded by: Mary Ware

Member of the Kansas House of Representatives from the 86th district
- In office January 9, 2023 – December 22, 2025
- Preceded by: Stephanie Byers
- Succeeded by: Abi Boatman

Personal details
- Born: February 16, 1982 (age 44)
- Party: Democratic
- Spouse: Bailey

Military service
- Branch/service: U.S. Marine Corps

Silas Miller is an American politician. A member of the Democratic Party, he has served as the representative for the 25th district in the Kansas Senate since 2025. He previously represented the 86th district in the Kansas House of Representatives from 2023 to 2025. In December 2025, he was appointed to the Kansas Senate.

== Career ==
Miller attended Wichita Public Schools and served in the U.S. Marine Corps, then returned to Wichita to pursue a career in cosmetology and barbery.

== Personal life ==
Miller and his wife, Bailey, reside in the East Front neighborhood of Wichita, Kansas.
