= Joe Harder =

American politician

Member of the Kansas Senate from the 25th district
- In office 1973–1992
- Succeeded by: Patricia Ranson

Member of the Kansas Senate from the 18th district
- In office 1969–1972

Member of the Kansas Senate from the 29th district
- In office 1965–1968

Member of the Kansas Senate from the 28th district
- In office 1961–1964

Personal details
- Born: February 1, 1916 Hillsboro, Kansas, U.S.
- Died: August 21, 2004 Winfield, Illinois
- Party: Republican
- Spouse: Maryan Lee Brooks (m. December 12, 1939)
- Children: 1
- Education: Bethel College

Joseph Carl Harder (February 1, 1916–August 21, 2004) was an American politician who served in the Kansas State Senate as a Republican from 1961 to 1992.

Harder was born in Hillsboro, Kansas and attended Bethel College. He married Maryan Lee Brooks in 1939 and served in the U.S. Navy during World War II.

In 1960, he was first elected to the Kansas Senate from the 28th district. He served one term there, one term in the 29th district, and one term in the 18th district before settling in for five consecutive terms from the 25th district from 1972 to 1992, when he was succeeded by Patricia Ranson.
