= Jean Schodorf =

American politician (born 1950)

Jean Kurtis Schodorf
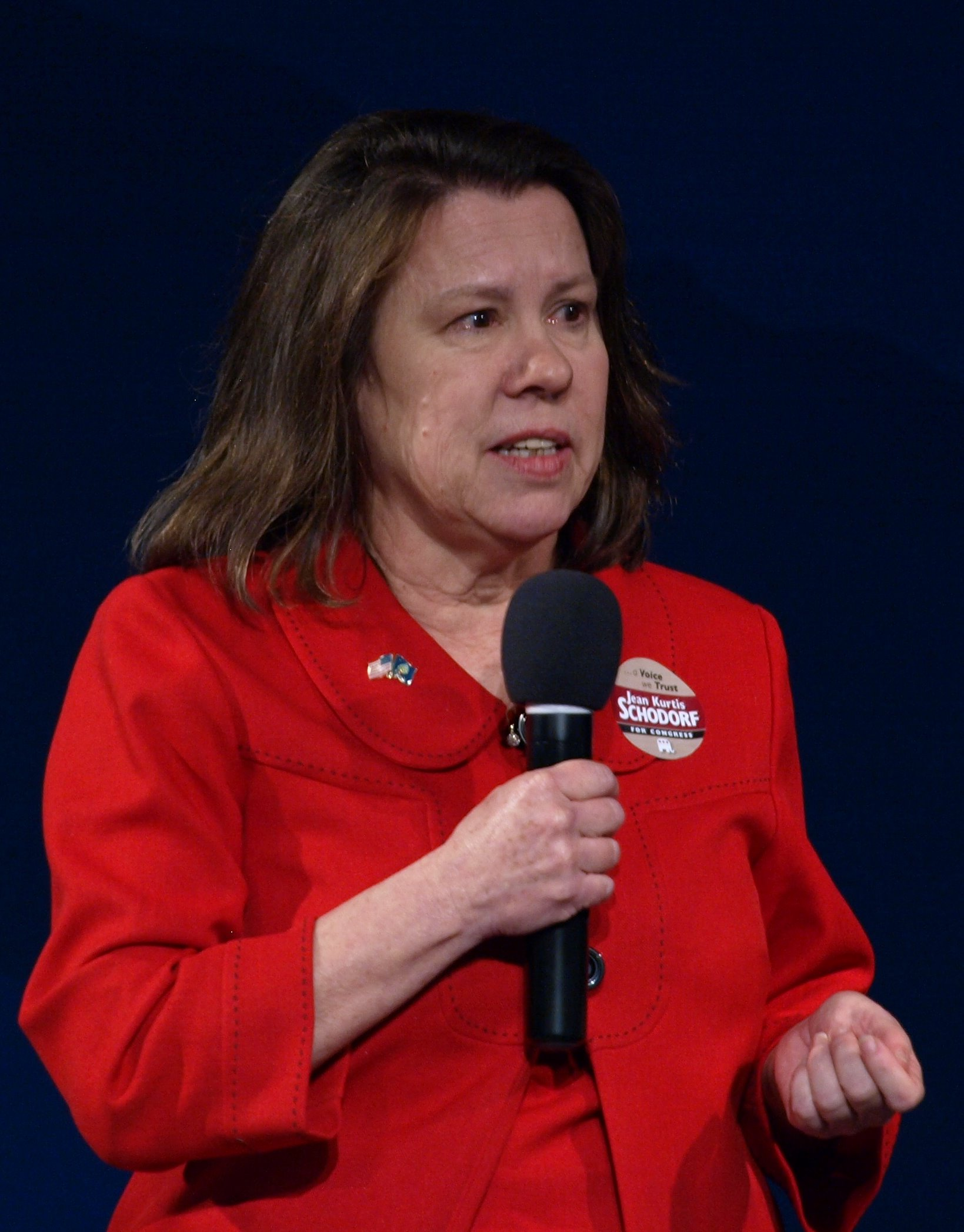
- Schodorf in 2010

Member of the Kansas Senate from the 25th district
- In office January 8, 2001 – January 14, 2013
- Preceded by: Patricia Ranson
- Succeeded by: Michael O'Donnell

Personal details
- Born: June 11, 1950 (age 76) Cherry Point, North Carolina, U.S.
- Party: Democratic (2013-present)
- Other political affiliations: Republican (until 2013)
- Spouse: Richard
- Children: 3
- Education: University of New Mexico; Wichita State University
- Profession: Speech pathologist

Jean Kurtis Schodorf (born June 11, 1950) is an American politician who was a three-term Republican Kansas state senator and was the Democratic Party nominee for Kansas Secretary of State in 2014. She was defeated on November 4, 2014 by incumbent Kris Kobach by a margin of 59%-41%.

== Early life ==
Schodorf was born to Wilma Mary Horton (1911–2002) and William A. Kuretich (Croatian: Kuretić), of Croatian origin (1914–2001), a U.S. Marine Corps brigadier general and decorated veteran of World War II. Her father’s military career included extensive travel for his family. Upon his retirement, the family settled in Independence, Kansas. She is the sister of television journalist Bill Kurtis.

== Education ==
Schodorf is a speech/language pathologist and graduated from University of New Mexico (Bachelor of Arts and Masters of Science) and Wichita State University (Ph.D. in Communicative Disorders, post-doctoral work in education administration).

== Political career ==
From 1989 to 2000, she was on the Board of Education for Unified School District 259 (Wichita School District) and was the board president in 1993, 1997 and 1999.

She was a Republican member of the Kansas Senate, representing the 25th district in Wichita, from 2001 to 2013.

In 2010, Schodorf was a candidate for U.S Representative of the 4th district, being vacated by Todd Tiahrt. She finished third in the Republican primary to Mike Pompeo, who won the general election.

In the 2012 Republican primary, Senator Schodorf, and Senate President Stephen Morris and six other state senate moderates were opposed by Governor Sam Brownback, the Kansas Chamber of Commerce and the Koch brothers. Although she was the Majority Whip, Schodorf was defeated on August 7, 2012, in her attempt to be re-elected to the Kansas Senate by Wichita City Council member Michael O'Donnell, 59 percent to 41 percent. Of those targeted, only Senator Carolyn McGinn won re-election.

In January 2013, Schodorf changed her party affiliation to Democrat.

In May 2016 Schodorf, by then a resident of Sedan, Kansas, announced she was running again for the Kansas legislature, this time as a state representative for District 12 in Southeast, Kansas. She lost the general election to Republican Doug Blex.

== Committee assignments ==
Sen. Schodorf served on these legislative committees:

- Education (chair)
- Joint Committee on Arts and Cultural Resources (vice-chair)
- Commerce
- Confirmation Oversight
- Interstate Cooperation
- Judiciary
- Ways and Means

== Sponsored legislation ==
Legislation sponsored or co-sponsored by Sen. Schodorf includes:

- A resolution opposing relocation of Guantanamo detainees to Kansas.
- A resolution regarding the right to bear arms.

== Major donors ==
Some of the top contributors to Sen. Schodorf's 2008 campaign were, according to the National Institute on Money in State Politics the Kansas Realtors Association, Kansas Contractors Association, Kansas Republican Senatorial Committee, Kansans for Lifesaving Cures and the Kansas National Education Association. Institutions were her major donor group.

== Elections ==
=== 2010 run for Congress ===
In 2010, Sen. Schodorf entered the primary race for the 4th Congressional District of Kansas, running against four other Republicans (Jim Anderson, Wink Hartman, Mike Pompeo and Paij Rutschman). She was endorsed by former U.S. Sen. Nancy Kassebaum Baker on July 13, 2010. Schodorf finished second in the Republican primary, losing to eventual general election winner Mike Pompeo.

=== 2012 ===
In the 2012 Republican primary for her state senate seat, Sen. Schodorf was defeated by Michael O'Donnell of Wichita in the Republican primary on August 7, 2012, by a 2,785 to 1,949 margin. Schodorf, a moderate, had been targeted by conservatives Republicans for defeat. O'Donnell went on to defeat Democratic nominee, the late Timothy L. Snow in the general election.

=== 2014 ===
In September 2013, Schodorf announced she was running for Secretary of State of Kansas, switching parties to run as a Democrat. She was defeated by incumbent Republican Kris Kobach, who was running for re-election.

=== 2016 ===
Running from rural Sedan, she lost the general election to Republican Doug Blex by a margin of 60.9% to 30%.

Party political offices
Preceded by Chris Biggs	Democratic nominee for Secretary of State of Kansas; 2014	Succeeded by Brian McClendon
