= Mary Ware =

Mary Ware may refer to:

- Mary Ware (politician) (born 1951), member of the Kansas Senate
- Mary Ware (writer) (1828–1915), American poet and prose writer
- Mary Lee Ware (1858–1937), American philanthropist
