= Patricia Ranson =

American politician

Member of the Kansas Senate from the 25th district
- In office 1993–2000
- Preceded by: Joe Harder
- Succeeded by: Jean Schodorf

Personal details
- Born: January 1, 1937 Columbine, Wyoming, U.S.
- Died: November 4, 2011 Independence, Kansas
- Party: Republican
- Spouse(s): Bob Storey (m. August 1958-divorced ????); Jack Ranson (m. May 14, 1982)
- Children: 2
- Education: University of Kansas

Patricia Moon Ranson (January 1, 1937–November 4, 2011) was an American politician who served in the Kansas State Senate as a Republican from the 25th district from 1993 to 2000.

== Biography ==
Patricia Ranson was born on January 1, 1937, in Columbine, Wyoming. Upon graduating from high school in Independence, Kansas in 1954, Ranson entered the Independence Junior College and later transferred to the University of Kansas. She obtained a Bachelor of Science in education in 1957.

After graduation, Ranson worked as a high school teacher and an administrative assistant for Governor Robert Bennett. She was elected to the Senate in 1992, and was re-elected in 1996.
