= 2012 MAVTV 500 IndyCar World Championships =

Motor race held in Fontana, California

(United States) 2012 MAVTV 500 IndyCar World Championships
Race details
Race 15 of 15 in the 2012 IndyCar Series season
| ← Previous race | Next race → |
- Layout of Auto Club Speedway
- Date: September 15, 2012
- Official name: MAVTV 500 IndyCar World Championships Presented by Lucas Oil
- Location: Auto Club Speedway, Fontana, California
- Course: Permanent racing facility 2.000 mi / 3.219 km
- Distance: 250 laps 500.000 mi / 804.672 km
- Weather: 98 °F (37 °C), fair skies

Pole position
- Driver: (United States) Marco Andretti (Andretti Autosport)
- Time: 1:06.6455

Fastest lap
- Driver: (United Kingdom) Dario Franchitti (Chip Ganassi Racing)
- Time: 33.2470 (on lap 228 of 250)

Podium
- First: (United States) Ed Carpenter (Ed Carpenter Racing)
- Second: (United Kingdom) Dario Franchitti (Chip Ganassi Racing)
- Third: (New Zealand) Scott Dixon (Chip Ganassi Racing)

The 2012 MAVTV 500 IndyCar World Championships Presented by Lucas Oil was an Izod IndyCar Series open-wheel race that was held on September 15, 2012, in Fontana, California at Auto Club Speedway. Contested over 250 laps, it was the 15th and final round of the 2012 Izod IndyCar Series. Ed Carpenter Racing driver Ed Carpenter won the race; Dario Franchitti of Chip Ganassi Racing finished second and Franchitti's teammate Scott Dixon came in third.

Marco Andretti earned his first pole position since 2008 by posting the fastest lap of qualifying. J. R. Hildebrand was the most dominant driver of the early portions of the race before contacting the wall on lap 74, placing him out of contention. As Carpenter and Dixon battled for the first position, Tony Kanaan passed them both and led throughout the middle stages; however, he was relegated down the running order because of a lengthy pit stop. Alex Tagliani then joined the battle for the win with Carpenter and Dixon before his engine blew late in the race. After the final restart with less than 10 laps remaining, Dixon was mired to third, while Carpenter chased down and passed Franchitti for the win on the final lap. The win was Carpenter's second of his IndyCar Series career and first as a team owner for Ed Carpenter Racing.

Meanwhile, Will Power and Ryan Hunter-Reay were the only drivers who had a mathematical shot of winning the Drivers' Championship prior to the race, with Power leading over Hunter-Reay by 17 points. Both drivers started deep in the grid due to penalties imposed for changing engines, but quickly made their way into the top-15. As Power passed Hunter-Reay on lap 56, his car broke loose in turn two and crashed. Power's team made extensive repairs to his car and he eventually completed 12 laps, passing the previously-retired E. J. Viso in the process, before retiring in order to defend his championship lead. However, by virtue of Tagliani's blown engine and Takuma Sato's last-lap crash, Hunter-Reay finished fourth and earned his first and only IndyCar Series Drivers' Championship by three points over Power.

== Background ==
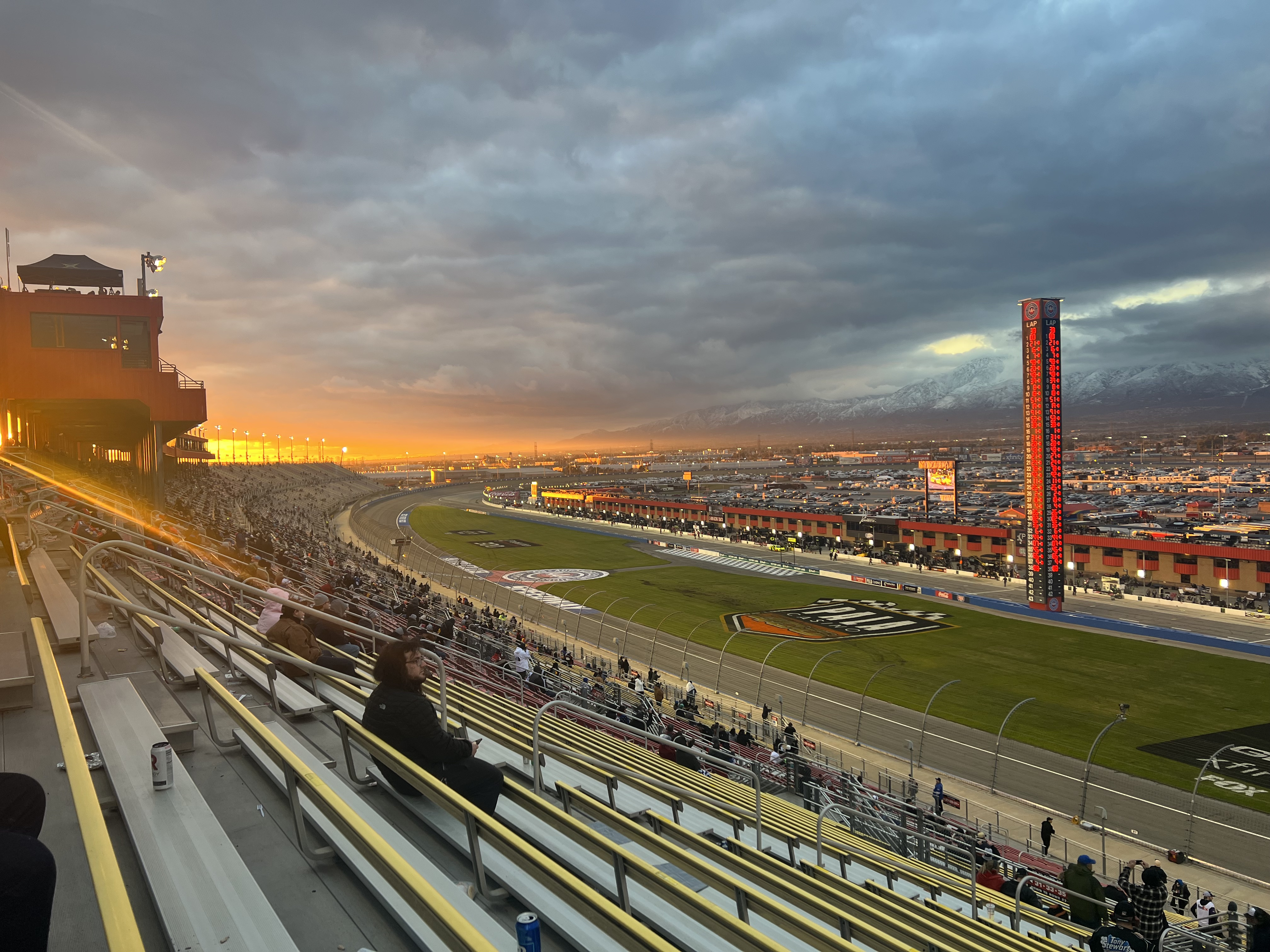
Auto Club Speedway (pictured in 2023), where the race was held.

The MAVTV 500 IndyCar World Championships was the 15th and final round of the 2012 Izod IndyCar Series and was held at Auto Club Speedway, a four-turn 2 mi (3.2 km) tri-oval circuit with 14-degree banking in the turns, 11-degree banking in the front stretch, and 3-degree banking in the back stretch, in Fontana, California, United States on September 15, 2012. The race was first announced by IndyCar chief executive officer Randy Bernard and track president Gillian Zucker in July 2011. It marked the IndyCar Series' first race at the track since 2005. While initially scheduled to be 400 miles (640 km) and 200 laps, the race was later lengthened to its original distance of 500 miles (800 km) and 250 laps, becoming the first 500-mile American open-wheel car race outside of the Indianapolis 500 since the 2002 The 500, which was also held at Auto Club Speedway.

Heading into the race, Will Power held the lead in the Drivers' Championship with 453 points, while Ryan Hunter-Reay stood second on 436. Hélio Castroneves was third with 401 points, one more than Scott Dixon in fourth and 29 more than Simon Pagenaud in fifth. Power and Hunter-Reay were the only drivers who had a mathematical shot of winning the championship; Power would be able to clinch the title if he won or finished second, while Hunter-Reay's most direct scenario of securing the championship was if he earned the maximum of 53 points and Power finished fourth or worse. Chevrolet had already clinched the Manufacturers' Championship in the Indy Grand Prix of Sonoma and led with 114 points, ahead of Honda on 96 and Lotus with 56.

IndyCar mandated a new aerodynamic package that was utilized in this race and that year's Indianapolis 500. Each car was required to feature rear-wheel guards, a rear-wing mainplane, and rear-wing end caps in order to dematerialize drag and create more downforce. Unlike the Indianapolis 500, the rear-wing wicker bill was removed from every car. Eight drivers tested the new package at Auto Club Speedway on September 6, and Dario Franchitti topped the speed charts at 216.7 mph (348.7 km/h). Dixon's lap of 215.861 mph (347.395 km/h) was fastest of the 22 drivers who participated in an eight-hour testing session at the track on September 12. Hunter-Reay, E. J. Viso, and Ryan Briscoe were all involved in separate crashes during the session.

One driver change occurred between the 26 cars that were entered for the race. Mike Conway of A. J. Foyt Racing was uncomfortable with racing on oval tracks and opted to sit out of the MAVTV 500; he was replaced by 2005 Infiniti Pro Series champion Wade Cunningham. Conway suffered injuries to his legs and back in a crash during the 2010 Indianapolis 500, and the IndyCar community remained uneased by high-speed oval racing in the aftermath of Dan Wheldon's death at Las Vegas Motor Speedway the year prior. Many drivers supported Conway's decision to back out of the race, with Tony Kanaan calling it "the most sincere thing a race-car driver has ever said."

== Practice and qualifying ==
Two practice sessions on Friday preceded the race on Saturday. The first lasted for 90 minutes and the second for 45 minutes. Briscoe led the first practice session on Friday afternoon with a time of 33.1008 seconds, beating second-quickest driver Ed Carpenter by eight hundredths of a second. Franchitti was third-quickest, ahead of Power and Castroneves. The session featured two stoppages, one for debris and one for Justin Wilson crashing into the turn-one SAFER barrier.

During the qualifying session later that day, each driver was required to complete two timed laps and the cumulative time of those laps would determine their starting position. Amidst gusty and humid conditions, Marco Andretti earned his second career pole position and his first since the 2008 ABC Supply Company A. J. Foyt 225 with a time of 1 minute and 6.6455 seconds. He was joined on the grid's front row by Briscoe, whose laps were 0.0032 seconds slower than Andretti's. Power qualified third, but was assessed a ten-place grid penalty for an engine change (his sixth of the season) along with Josef Newgarden, Dixon, Alex Tagliani, Castroneves, Graham Rahal, James Hinchcliffe, Pagenaud, Takuma Sato, Hunter-Reay, Charlie Kimball, Cunningham, Wilson, and Simona de Silvestro, the latter two of whom did not make qualifying attempts because of Wilson's crash and de Silvestro's failing engine in the first practice session. With the penalties imposed, Kanaan was bumped up to third place, with J. R. Hildebrand in fourth and Carpenter in fifth. Rubens Barrichello, Katherine Legge, Oriol Servià, Franchitti, Sebastián Saavedra, Viso, and James Jakes occupied the next seven positions, ahead of the 14 penalized drivers.

In the second practice session on Friday evening, Carpenter set the fastest time at 33.3691 seconds, ahead of Castroneves, Briscoe, Kanaan, and Newgarden. Cunningham slammed the wall in turn two with five minutes remaining in the session, though he was uninjured.

=== Qualifying classification ===
| Pos. | No. | Driver | Team | Time | Speed | Grid |
|---|---|---|---|---|---|---|
| 1 | 26 | (United States) Marco Andretti | Andretti Autosport | 1:06.6455 | 216.069 | 1 |
| 2 | 2 | (Australia) Ryan Briscoe | Team Penske | 1:06.6487 | 216.058 | 2 |
| 3 | 12 | (Australia) Will Power | Team Penske | 1:06.6851 | 215.940 | 13^{1} |
| 4 | 67 | (United States) Josef Newgarden | Sarah Fisher Hartman Racing | 1:06.6918 | 215.919 | 14^{2} |
| 5 | 9 | (New Zealand) Scott Dixon | Chip Ganassi Racing | 1:06.8553 | 215.391 | 15^{2} |
| 6 | 98 | (Canada) Alex Tagliani | Barracuda Racing | 1:06.9065 | 215.226 | 16^{3} |
| 7 | 11 | (Brazil) Tony Kanaan | KV Racing Technology | 1:07.0151 | 214.877 | 3 |
| 8 | 4 | (United States) J. R. Hildebrand | Panther Racing | 1:07.0549 | 214.749 | 4 |
| 9 | 20 | (United States) Ed Carpenter | Ed Carpenter Racing | 1:07.0753 | 214.684 | 5 |
| 10 | 3 | (Brazil) Hélio Castroneves | Team Penske | 1:07.1615 | 214.409 | 17^{1} |
| 11 | 38 | (United States) Graham Rahal | Chip Ganassi Racing | 1:07.2851 | 214.015 | 18^{2} |
| 12 | 27 | (Canada) James Hinchcliffe | Andretti Autosport | 1:07.3760 | 213.726 | 19^{3} |
| 13 | 8 | (Brazil) Rubens Barrichello | KV Racing Technology | 1:07.4389 | 213.527 | 6 |
| 14 | 6 | (United Kingdom) Katherine Legge | Dragon Racing | 1:07.5080 | 213.308 | 7 |
| 15 | 77 | (France) Simon Pagenaud | Schmidt Hamilton Motorsports | 1:07.5164 | 213.282 | 20^{3} |
| 16 | 15 | (Japan) Takuma Sato | Rahal Letterman Lanigan Racing | 1:07.5354 | 213.222 | 21^{2} |
| 17 | 28 | (United States) Ryan Hunter-Reay | Andretti Autosport | 1:07.6778 | 212.773 | 22^{1} |
| 18 | 22 | (Spain) Oriol Servià | Dreyer & Reinbold Racing | 1:07.7541 | 212.533 | 8 |
| 19 | 10 | (United Kingdom) Dario Franchitti | Chip Ganassi Racing | 1:07.9247 | 211.999 | 9 |
| 20 | 83 | (United States) Charlie Kimball | Chip Ganassi Racing | 1:08.0751 | 211.531 | 23^{2} |
| 21 | 17 | (Colombia) Sebastián Saavedra | AFS Racing-Andretti Autosport | 1:08.3699 | 210.619 | 10 |
| 22 | 5 | (Venezuela) E. J. Viso | KV Racing Technology | 1:08.5276 | 210.134 | 11 |
| 23 | 14 | (New Zealand) Wade Cunningham | A. J. Foyt Racing | 1:08.7265 | 209.526 | 24^{2} |
| 24 | 19 | (United Kingdom) James Jakes | Dale Coyne Racing | 1:09.2120 | 208.056 | 12 |
| 25 | 18 | (United Kingdom) Justin Wilson | Dale Coyne Racing | — | — | 25^{2} |
| 26 | 78 | (Switzerland) Simona de Silvestro | HVM Racing | — | — | 26^{2} |

Notes

- ^1 – Issued a ten-place grid penalty for exceeding the series' quota of five engines for the season.
- ^2 – Issued a ten-place grid penalty for an unapproved engine change.
- ^3 – Issued a ten-place grid penalty for both aforementioned infractions.

== Race ==
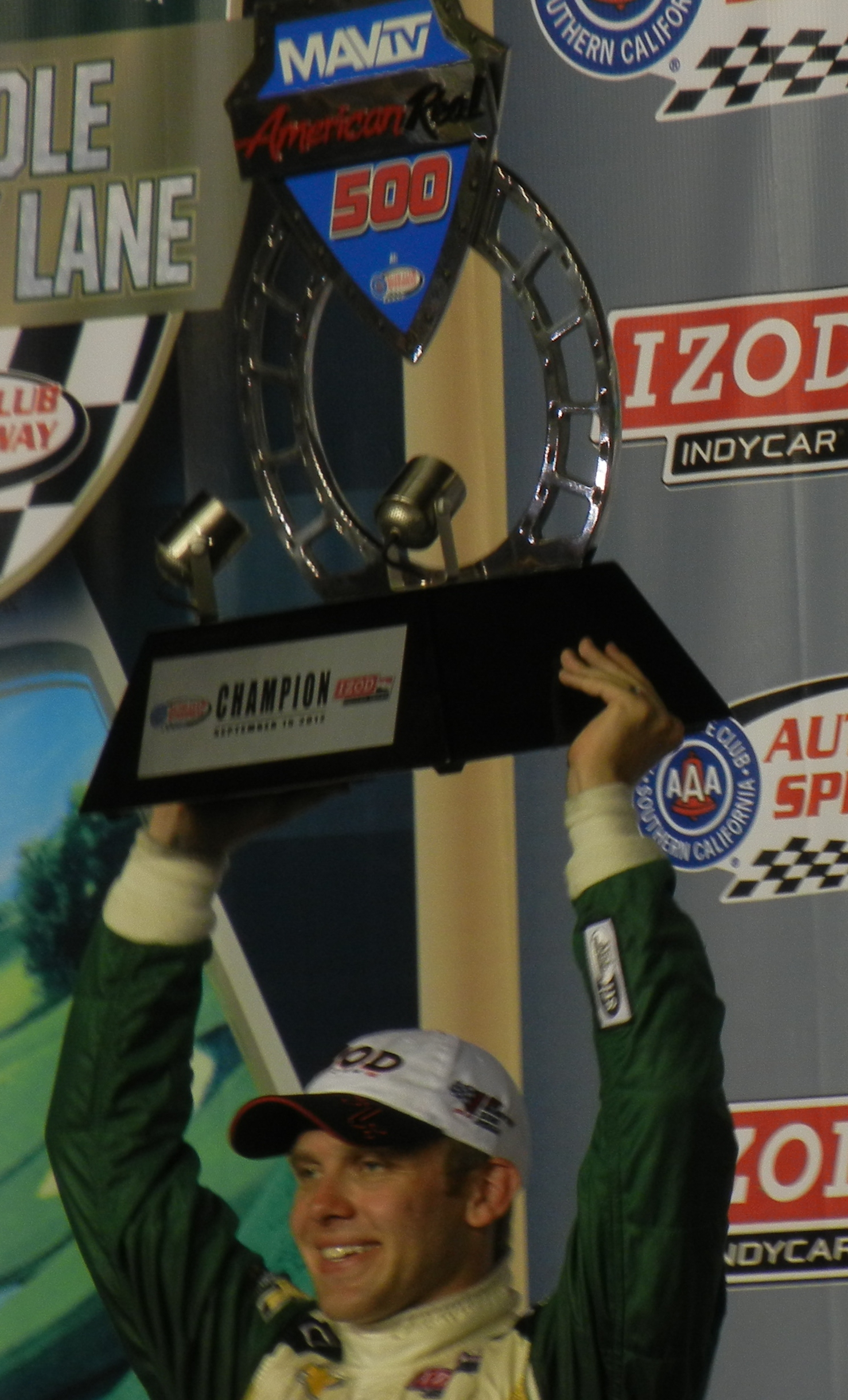
Ed Carpenter celebrating in victory lane after winning the MAVTV 500, his second career victory in the Izod IndyCar Series.

Weather conditions at the start of the race were clear and muggy, with air temperatures at 98 °F (37 °C) and track temperatures at 113 °F (45 °C). Approximately 25,000 people attended the race. Actress Melora Hardin of The Office sang the national anthem and Dish Network general manager Nate Block commanded the drivers to start their engines. The green flag was waved at 5:50 p.m. local time (UTC−07:00) to begin the race. Kanaan drove to Andretti's right side and passed him to take the lead on lap 1. Andretti reclaimed the position a lap later, but again lost the lead to Hildebrand on the third lap. Hildebrand and Andretti remained alongside each other until Hildebrand pulled ahead on lap 6. Over the next 25 laps, Hildebrand grew his lead over Andretti to 3.6 seconds. The first round of green-flag pit stops commenced on lap 31 with Andretti making a stop; Hildebrand entered pit road five laps later, handing the lead to Briscoe for two laps. Sato led before he made a stop on the 40th lap, and after Newgarden made his stop a lap later, Hildebrand regained the lead.

On lap 56, Power engaged in a battle with fellow championship frontrunner Hunter-Reay for 12th place when his car suddenly spun backwards into the wall in turn two, prompting the first caution flag of the race. Hunter-Reay barely escaped the incident without damage, though he still was not assured to win the championship. All the leaders elected to make pit stops under the caution period. Hildebrand led the field back up to speed at the restart on lap 65, followed by Carpenter and Barrichello. Carpenter drove to the inside line and overtook Hildebrand a lap later. On the 74th lap, Hildebrand lost control of his car as he chased Carpenter for the lead and nudged the turn-two wall with his right-rear tire, triggering the second caution. Most of the leaders made stops during the caution for fresh tires and fuel. As the drivers prepared for the upcoming restart, Legge hit the rear of Wilson's car and spun him out in the third turn on lap 81, lengthening the caution period. Jakes remained on the track and led at the lap-85 restart, though he was quickly passed by Carpenter and Dixon in turn three a lap later.

Carpenter's 0.9-second lead over Dixon was diminished on lap 108 after Barrichello's car caught ablaze and stopped on the apron, necessitating the third caution. Most of the leaders, including Carpenter, made pit stops for tires and fuel. Dixon took over the lead for one lap before making his stop on lap 111. Carpenter regained the lead ahead of the lap-115 restart, followed by Kanaan and Dixon. Eight laps later, Rahal made contact with the turn-two wall, though no caution was thrown. Dixon passed Kanaan for second place on the 119th lap, and got by Carpenter to take the lead four laps later. On the 124th lap, Power rejoined the race after his team made repairs to his car in order to improve in the finishing order and defend his championship lead. He completed 12 laps and improved to 24th over Viso before permanently retiring, meaning that Hunter-Reay was forced to finish no worse than fifth to clinch the title. Meanwhile, Kanaan drove to Dixon's right side and passed him for the lead on the 134th lap. Castroneves overtook Dixon for second place by lap 140, and took the lead for two laps once Kanaan made a pit stop on lap 148. Sato assumed the lead until he pitted on the 153rd lap, giving the lead back to Kanaan. He and Dixon briefly drove alongside each other on lap 154, but by lap 175, his lead grew to 2.3 seconds.

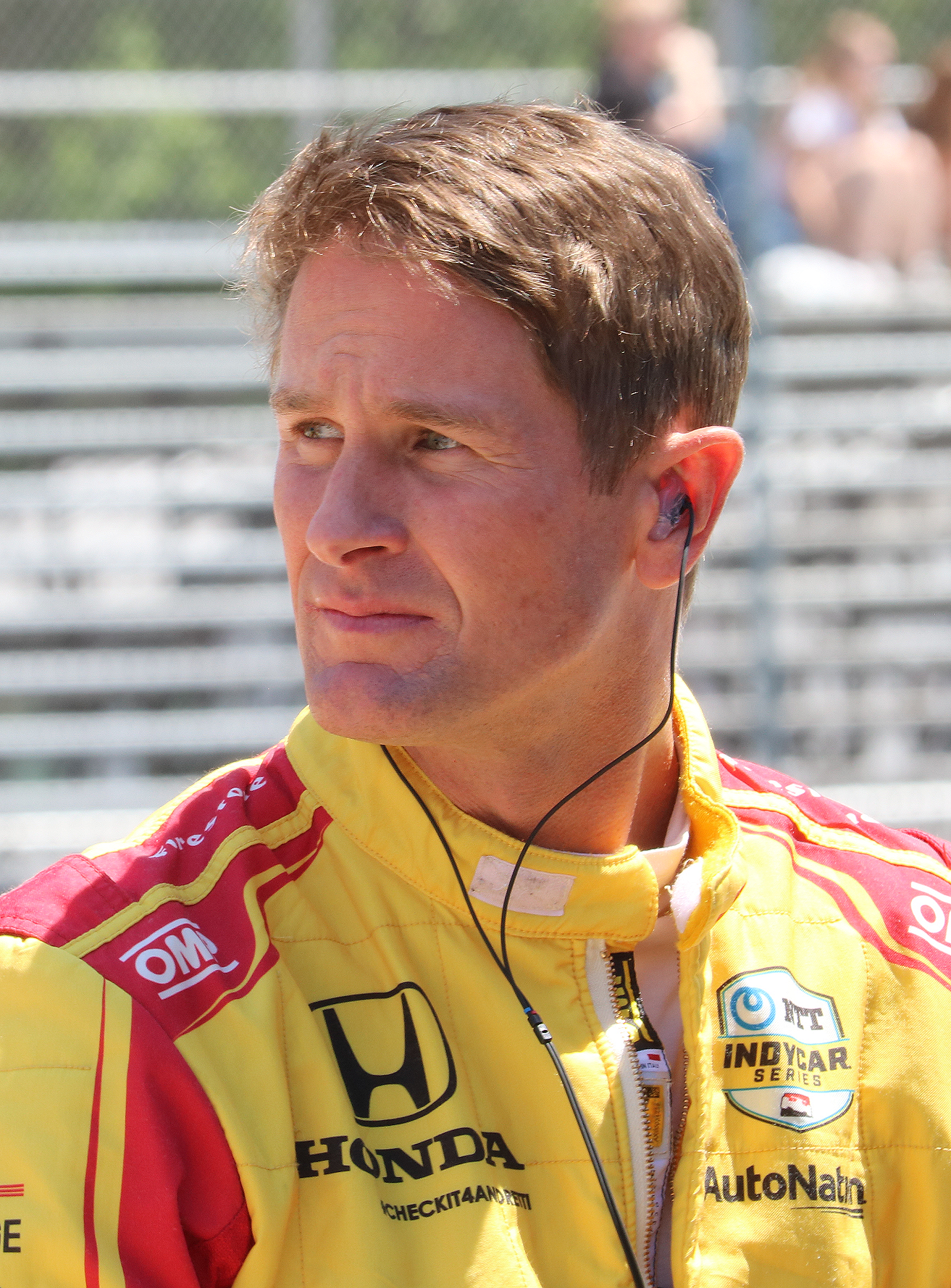
Ryan Hunter-Reay (pictured in 2021) earned his sole IndyCar Series championship by virtue of a fourth-place finish.

The race's fourth caution was flown on lap 182 when Briscoe made contact with the turn-four barrier. All the leaders made pit stops under the caution period. Kanaan's team repaired his loose engine cover and he fell to seventh, allowing Dixon to take the lead for the restart at the 189th lap, ahead of Franchitti and Tagliani. Franchitti raced side-by-side with Dixon on lap 190, but never passed him. Carpenter then moved into the second position and battled with Dixon for the lead; Carpenter led lap 196, Dixon reclaimed the lead on lap 197, and Carpenter took back the first position two laps later. Tagliani then moved into the first position on the 204th lap. He was only able to garner a 0.4-second advantage before Carpenter drove up the track to retake the lead on lap 218, but his lead grew again when Carpenter made light contact with the turn-two wall on the next lap; Sato then overtook Carpenter for second place. The final round of green-flag pit stops began on lap 223. A lap later, Tagliani made his last stop and gave up the lead to Franchitti, who remained on the track until the 226th lap. Tagliani then retook the first position, but was passed by Sato two laps later. Tagliani's engine expired on lap 230, bringing out the fifth caution and handing Hunter-Reay fifth place and the championship lead.

Carpenter led at the lap-235 restart, ahead of Sato and Franchitti. Hunter-Reay steered up the track and charged by Dixon for fourth place; two laps later, he got by Sato for the third position, while Franchitti passed Carpenter for the lead. On the 241st lap, Kanaan lost control and spun into the outside wall in turn three. The sixth caution was initially waved before a red flag was displayed for four minutes and 56 seconds, which stopped the race so that officials would be able to clean the debris and a green-flag finish would be all but guaranteed. Franchitti led on the restart at the 244th lap; second-place driver Carpenter made a failed attempt to pass Franchitti on his right-hand side. Two laps later, Hunter-Reay let Dixon overtake him for third place and defended his fourth position from Sato for the remaining five laps. Finally, Sato lost control of his car on lap 250 and crashed in turn two, causing the seventh (and final) caution. As this occurred, Carpenter made a successful pass on Franchitti in the first turn and led to the checkered flag, earning him his second career win and first as the owner of Ed Carpenter Racing. He became the first owner–driver to win an IndyCar Series race since Adrián Fernández in the 2004 Toyota Indy 400. Franchitti finished 1.9132 seconds behind Carpenter, with Dixon coming in third. Hunter-Reay's fourth-place finish was enough to secure him his first IndyCar Series Drivers' Championship. Castroneves took fifth, ahead of Rahal in sixth, Sato in seventh, Andretti in eighth, Legge in ninth, and Kimball in tenth. The final classified finishers were Hildebrand, Jakes, Hinchcliffe, Cunningham, Pagenaud, Newgarden, Briscoe, and Servià.

=== Post-race ===
Carpenter drove to victory lane to celebrate his win, which earned him $35,000. In a post-race press conference, Carpenter expressed delight in his victory, saying: "This feels great for a brand new team that just started in November. I probably should have won (the Indianapolis 500) but I kind of messed up a little bit. We have been trying to win ovals all year and finally got it done tonight. Good way to end the year." In regards to his plans for the team for the 2013 season, Carpenter stated: "We've been trying to find a way to get to a second car team at time this is year and for sure next year. Whether or not that will happen, there are a lot of factors that go into being able to expand, but maybe getting this win will help us with that." Second-place finisher Franchitti wanted to reflect on his season and improve on all the mistakes he and his team had made, commenting: "Today in qualifying the car just had a lot of oversteer in turns one and two and I thought I was in the (catch) fence. The same thing happened this morning and we thought we fixed it. It snapped way out of line and I managed to catch it but I had to lift and that was that.” Dixon, who finished third, spoke positively of his race: "It was a good night. Our car was good, especially that start in the middle was fairly strong, but we faded a little bit towards the end there and once we hit traffic it wasn't as good as what I had been. We worked hard at it, I got a little loose towards the end there."

After finishing the race, Hunter-Reay and his team celebrated his first IndyCar Series Drivers' Championship, earning him the historic Astor Cup trophy and a $1 million bonus. Hunter-Reay was initially in disbelief and said of his first championship: "I have no idea how I won this championship. It was team effort right there. We were struggling all weekend. I didn't want to let anyone really know about it. We were really in the woods. This hasn't sunk in yet." He later lauded Power for his performance throughout the season: "I think Will (Power)'s one of the great talents there has been in IndyCar in a very long time. He's one of the best. He certainly would be a deserving champion if he won it. But we had a breakout year." Power, second in the championship standings, was sympathetic for his team and disappointed to lose the title by a small margin for the third consecutive season: "I feel bad for the team. I really do. I feel bad for my guys to be three years in a row so close, and you see the effort that they put in just to get me out to do 12 more laps in such a short space for a completely wrecked car. I don't know what to say. I feel sorry for Penske Racing to end up in this position again because of one of my mistakes." Despite his close loss, he remained fair to Hunter-Reay, calling him a "deserving champion."

Media reception to the race was mostly positive. Robin Miller of the Speed Channel wrote: "What we saw Saturday night was Indy car racing at its jaw-dropping best; a wild west show with 30 lead changes, non-stop passing, one game-changing accident, a spirited charge to the title, an impressive victory for a little guy and the kind of drama that can’t be scripted. If you didn’t like the MAVTV 500, then you probably need to find another sport to watch." ESPN's John Oreovicz praised the series for providing championship drama without "an artificial playoff system," and Jim Peltz of the Los Angeles Times spoke of a "tense, thrilling race" in spite of the series' "troubled state" and an attendance rate which he felt was low. However, there was controversy that mainly surrounded IndyCar officials' decision to issue the red flag after Kanaan's crash. Carpenter admitted neither he nor any other driver knew why the red flag was thrown, while Andretti Autosport owner Michael Andretti was unhappy with the red flag. Tony DiZinno of Racer.com was especially critical of the red flag, writing: "IndyCar is damn lucky and should be thankful Hunter-Reay held on for the title given the potential fallout." IndyCar race director Beaux Barfield defended the decision, ensuring that he had discussed such a scenario with teams prior to the race.

The final result gave Hunter-Reay the Drivers' Championship with an accumulated total of 468 points, three more than Power in second; Hunter-Reay became the first American driver to win a premier American open-wheel racing championship since Sam Hornish Jr. in 2006. Dixon concluded the season third in the standings with 435 points, ahead of fourth-placed Castroneves on 431 and fifth-placed Pagenaud, who was awarded the Rookie of the Year, with 387. Chevrolet amassed 123 points in the Manufacturers' Championship, while Honda was second on 102. Lotus remained third with 60 points. The race took two hours, 57 minutes, and 34 seconds to complete, and featured seven caution flags and 29 lead changes amongst 12 drivers.

=== Race classification ===
| Pos | No. | Driver | Team | Laps | Time/Retired | Grid | Points |
|---|---|---|---|---|---|---|---|
| 1 | 20 | (United States) Ed Carpenter | Ed Carpenter Racing | 250 | 2:57:34.7433 | 5 | 52^{1} |
| 2 | 10 | (United Kingdom) Dario Franchitti | Chip Ganassi Racing | 250 | +1.9132 | 9 | 40 |
| 3 | 9 | (New Zealand) Scott Dixon | Chip Ganassi Racing | 250 | +2.6091 | 15 | 35 |
| 4 | 28 | (United States) Ryan Hunter-Reay | Andretti Autosport | 250 | +3.0477 | 22 | 32 |
| 5 | 3 | (Brazil) Hélio Castroneves | Team Penske | 250 | +4.1933 | 17 | 30 |
| 6 | 38 | (United States) Graham Rahal | Chip Ganassi Racing | 250 | +5.4381 | 18 | 28 |
| 7 | 15 | (Japan) Takuma Sato | Rahal Letterman Lanigan Racing | 249 | Contact | 21 | 26 |
| 8 | 26 | (United States) Marco Andretti | Andretti Autosport | 249 | +1 lap | 1 | 25^{2} |
| 9 | 6 | (United Kingdom) Katherine Legge | Dragon Racing | 249 | +1 lap | 7 | 22 |
| 10 | 83 | (United States) Charlie Kimball | Chip Ganassi Racing | 249 | +1 lap | 23 | 20 |
| 11 | 4 | (United States) J. R. Hildebrand | Panther Racing | 248 | +2 laps | 4 | 19 |
| 12 | 19 | (United Kingdom) James Jakes | Dale Coyne Racing | 248 | +2 laps | 12 | 18 |
| 13 | 27 | (Canada) James Hinchcliffe | Andretti Autosport | 247 | +3 laps | 19 | 17 |
| 14 | 14 | (New Zealand) Wade Cunningham | A. J. Foyt Racing | 246 | +4 laps | 24 | 16 |
| 15 | 77 | (France) Simon Pagenaud | Schmidt Hamilton Motorsports | 246 | +4 laps | 20 | 15 |
| 16 | 67 | (United States) Josef Newgarden | Sarah Fisher Hartman Racing | 244 | +6 laps | 14 | 14 |
| 17 | 2 | (Australia) Ryan Briscoe | Team Penske | 244 | +6 laps | 2 | 13 |
| 18 | 11 | (Brazil) Tony Kanaan | KV Racing Technology | 240 | Contact | 3 | 12 |
| 19 | 22 | (Spain) Oriol Servià | Dreyer & Reinbold Racing | 231 | +19 laps | 6 | 12 |
| 20 | 98 | (Canada) Alex Tagliani | Barracuda Racing | 229 | Contact | 16 | 12 |
| 21 | 17 | (Colombia) Sebastián Saavedra | AFS Racing-Andretti Autosport | 118 | Electrical | 10 | 12 |
| 22 | 8 | (Brazil) Rubens Barrichello | KV Racing Technology | 107 | Mechanical | 6 | 12 |
| 23 | 18 | (United Kingdom) Justin Wilson | Dale Coyne Racing | 80 | Mechanical | 25 | 12 |
| 24 | 12 | (Australia) Will Power | Team Penske | 66 | Contact | 13 | 12 |
| 25 | 5 | (Venezuela) E. J. Viso | KV Racing Technology | 65 | Mechanical | 11 | 10 |
| 26 | 78 | (Switzerland) Simona de Silvestro | HVM Racing | 16 | Mechanical | 26 | 10 |

Notes

- ^1 — Includes two bonus points for leading the most laps.
- ^2 — Includes one bonus point for being the fastest qualifier.

== Standings after the race ==
Drivers' Championship standings
| +/– | Pos. | Driver | Points |
|---|---|---|---|
| **1** | 1 | (United States) **Ryan Hunter-Reay** | 468 |
| **1** | 2 | (Australia) Will Power | 465 (–3) |
| **1** | 3 | (New Zealand) Scott Dixon | 435 (–33) |
| **1** | 4 | (Brazil) Hélio Castroneves | 431 (–37) |
| | 5 | (France) Simon Pagenaud | 387 (–81) |

Manufacturers' Championship standings
| +/– | Pos. | Manufacturer | Points |
|---|---|---|---|
| | 1 | (United States) **Chevrolet** | 123 |
| | 2 | (Japan) Honda | 102 (–21) |
| | 3 | (United Kingdom) Lotus | 60 (–63) |

- Note: Only the top five positions are included for the Drivers' Championship standings.
- **Bold text** indicates the national champions.

| Previous race: 2012 Grand Prix of Baltimore | IndyCar Series; 2012 season | Next race: 2013 Honda Grand Prix of St. Petersburg |
| Previous race: 2005 Toyota Indy 400 | MAVTV 500 IndyCar World Championships | Next race: 2013 MAVTV 500 IndyCar World Championships |
