= Abi Boatman =

American politician

Member of the Kansas House of Representatives from the 86th district
- Incumbent
- Assumed office January 2026
- Preceded by: Silas Miller

Personal details
- Party: Democratic

Military service
- Allegiance: United States
- Branch/service: United States Air Force
- Years of service: 2001–2011

Elle Abigail "Abi" Boatman is an American politician who is a Democratic member of the Kansas House of Representatives since 2026. Boatman was first elected by precinct leaders to fill a vacant seat in January 2026 when her predecessor Silas Miller was elected to the Kansas Senate. She represents the 86th district in southeast Wichita.

Boatman served in the United States Air Force as an aircraft mechanic, including as a C-130 crew chief. She served from 2001 until she was honorably discharged after coming out as transgender in 2011.

In the 2025-2026 session, Boatman serves on committees for Education, Agriculture and Natural Resources, Veterans and Military, and Financial Institutions and Pensions.

== See also ==
List of transgender public officeholders in the United States
