= 2012 Grand Prix of Baltimore =

(United States) 2012 Grand Prix of Baltimore
Race details
- 11th round of the 2012 IndyCar Series season
- Date: September 2, 2012
- Official name: Grand Prix of Baltimore
- Location: Streets of Baltimore
- Course: Temporary street circuit 2.040 mi / 3.283 km
- Distance: 75 laps 153.000 mi / 246.225 km
- Weather: Temperatures reaching up to 84.9 °F (29.4 °C); dropping down to 81.4 °F (27.4 °C) by the end of the event

Pole position
- Driver: (Australia) Will Power (Team Penske)
- Time: 1:17.9750

Fastest lap
- Driver: (Australia) Will Power (Team Penske)
- Time: 1:19.0055 (on lap 64 of 75)

Podium
- First: (United States) Ryan Hunter-Reay (Andretti Autosport)
- Second: (Australia) Ryan Briscoe (Team Penske)
- Third: (France) Simon Pagenaud (Schmidt Hamilton Motorsports)

The Grand Prix of Baltimore presented by SRT was an open-wheel IndyCar motor race and held as the fourteenth and penultimate round of the 2012 IndyCar Series season. It took place on Sunday, September 2, 2012. The race was contested over 75 laps at the 2.040-mile (3.283 km) temporary street circuit at Baltimore, Maryland, United States and was co-located with the Baltimore Sports Car Challenge motor race.

The race was won by American racer Ryan Hunter-Reay racing for Andretti Autosport. Hunter-Reay finished 1.4 seconds ahead of Australian driver Ryan Briscoe driving for Team Penske with Frenchman Simon Pagenaud finishing third for Schmidt Hamilton Motorsports. It was Hunter-Reay's fourth win for the year. With just one race left in the season, Hunter-Reay's victory, coupled with Will Power finishing in sixth position closed the gap between the two championship rivals to just 17 points.

== Race ==
The race was held on September 2, 2012 at 2:40 PM EDT

Power qualified on the pole and led the opening stanza of the race. Hunter-Reay charged from 11th to fifth before Ed Carpenter crashed early at the chicane. Mike Conway and Bruno Junqueira were spun around in two separate incidents at turn 6, and Sebastien Bourdais spun at the final corner as the rain started to fall on the track. On Lap 19, Marco Andretti would crash at turn 1, and the yellow ensured that the leaders would switch to wet tires. As the leaders came to pit, Hunter-Reay stayed out and took the lead.

As the race restarted, Dario Franchitti was turned around by Simona de Silvestro, James Hinchcliffe and Charlie Kimball had retired from the race with mechanical issues.

With seven Laps to go, Hunter-Reay was right behind race leader Ryan Briscoe before the final restart. Briscoe slowed for the restart and Hunter-Reay blew by him to take the lead. In turn 4 on the same lap, Mike Conway got into the tire barrier and Justin Wilson was pitched on to his car, causing a blockage of the track.

Hunter-Reay was able to keep Pagenaud at bay on the restart, by the white flag, Ryan Brisoce had moved back into second and chasing after Hunter-Reay. Hunter-Reay would win the race, his fourth of the year and keep his championship hopes alive heading into Fontana.

== Classification ==
=== Race results ===
Pos	No.	Driver	Team	Engine	Laps	Time/Retired	Grid	Laps Led	Points^{1}
1	28	(United States) Ryan Hunter-Reay	Andretti Autosport	Chevrolet	75	1:39:48.5083	10	13	50
2	2	(Australia) Ryan Briscoe	Team Penske	Chevrolet	75	+ 1.4391	11	11	40
3	77	(France) Simon Pagenaud (R)	Schmidt Hamilton Motorsports	Honda	75	+ 3.0253	9	14	35
4	9	(New Zealand) Scott Dixon	Chip Ganassi Racing	Honda	75	+ 3.9281	2	0	40
5	8	(Brazil) Rubens Barrichello	KV Racing Technology	Chevrolet	75	+ 5.0450	15	0	30
6	12	(Australia) Will Power	Team Penske	Chevrolet	75	+ 5.7467	1	22	31
7	22	(Spain) Oriol Servià	Panther/Dreyer & Reinbold Racing	Chevrolet	75	+ 7.5913	16	0	26
8	98	(Canada) Alex Tagliani	Team Barracuda – BHA	Honda	75	+ 7.7701	13	1	24
9	5	(Venezuela) E. J. Viso	KV Racing Technology	Chevrolet	75	+ 8.8651	22	0	22
10	3	(Brazil) Hélio Castroneves	Team Penske	Chevrolet	75	+ 9.0843	14	0	20
11	38	(United States) Graham Rahal	Chip Ganassi Racing	Honda	75	+ 10.2963	21	0	19
12	4	(United States) J. R. Hildebrand	Panther Racing	Chevrolet	75	+ 17.1591	23	0	18
13	10	(United Kingdom) Dario Franchitti	Chip Ganassi Racing	Honda	74	+ 1 lap	4	0	17
14	26	(United States) Marco Andretti	Andretti Autosport	Chevrolet	74	+ 1 lap	18	0	16
15	27	(Canada) James Hinchcliffe	Andretti Autosport	Chevrolet	73	+ 2 laps	5	2	15
16	14	(United Kingdom) Mike Conway	A. J. Foyt Enterprises	Honda	73	+ 2 laps	12	0	14
17	18	(United Kingdom) Justin Wilson	Dale Coyne Racing	Honda	72	+ 3 laps	7	0	13
18	83	(United States) Charlie Kimball	Chip Ganassi Racing	Honda	65	Mechanical	17	0	12
19	67	(Brazil) Bruno Junqueira	Sarah Fisher Hartman Racing	Honda	64	Contact	20	0	12
20	11	(Brazil) Tony Kanaan	KV Racing Technology	Chevrolet	52	Contact	6	0	12
21	15	(Japan) Takuma Sato	Rahal Letterman Lanigan Racing	Honda	50	Mechanical	24	12	12
22	78	(Switzerland) Simona de Silvestro	HVM Racing	Lotus	38	Contact	25	0	12
23	7	(France) Sébastien Bourdais	Dragon Racing	Chevrolet	32	Mechanical	3	32	12
24	19	(United Kingdom) James Jakes	Dale Coyne Racing	Honda	31	Contact	19	0	12
25	20	(United States) Ed Carpenter	Ed Carpenter Racing	Chevrolet	7	Contact	8	0	10
OFFICIAL BOX SCORE

Notes

^{1} Points include 1 point for pole position and 2 points for most laps led.

== Standings after the race ==
Drivers' Championship

Pos	Driver	Points
1	(Australia) Will Power	453
2	(United States) Ryan Hunter-Reay	436
3	(Brazil) Hélio Castroneves	401
4	(New Zealand) Scott Dixon	400
5	(France) Simon Pagenaud	372

Manufacturers' Championship

Pos	Manufacturer	Points
1	(United States) Chevrolet	114
2	(Japan) Honda	96
3	(United Kingdom) Lotus	56

- Note: Only the top five positions are included for the driver standings.

Previous race: 2012 GoPro Indy Grand Prix of Sonoma	IZOD IndyCar Series; 2012 season	Next race: 2012 MAVTV 500 IndyCar World Championships
Previous race: 2011 Baltimore Grand Prix	Grand Prix of Baltimore	Next race: 2013 Grand Prix of Baltimore
