= Michael O'Donnell (Kansas politician) =

American politician (born 1985)

Michael O'Donnell, II

Sedgwick County Commissioner
- In office 2017 – November 13, 2020
- Preceded by: Tim Norton

Member of the Kansas Senate from the 25th district
- In office January 9, 2013 – January 10, 2017
- Preceded by: Jean Schodorf
- Succeeded by: Lynn Rogers

Personal details
- Born: August 6, 1985 (age 41) Wichita, Kansas, U.S.
- Party: Republican
- Education: Friends University
- Profession: Politician

Michael O'Donnell II (born August 6, 1985) – also known as Michael O'Donnell, Jr. – is a former Republican member of the Sedgwick County Commission in Kansas, representing District 2 from 2017 to 2020. He previously represented the 25h district in the Kansas Senate, and was a member of the Wichita City Council.

== Early life ==
O'Donnell is a native of Wichita, who grew up in south Wichita and neighboring Haysville, and subsequently moved to nearby Bel Aire.

O'Donnell's father Michael O'Donnell Sr. was senior pastor of Grace Baptist Church in Wichita. In 1991, pastor O'Donnell was a participant in the nationally prominent the Summer of Mercy anti-abortion protests, and the younger O'Donnell has noted "We just got involved in campaigns at a very young age." His mother, Peggy O'Donnell, a teacher at the Sunrise Christian Academy, eventually served as a member of the Bel Aire city council.

O'Donnell attended a year at Baptist Bible College, before graduating from Friends University in Wichita, with a B.S. in political science.

In 2005, while in college, O'Donnell worked as an ad salesman for Clear Channel Radio, continuing in radio sales until 2011. In 2011, the year he ran successfully for Wichita City Council, O'Donnell was employed in marketing by local businessman-politician Wink Hartman, for whom O'Donnell claimed to work 20 hours a week.

== Political career ==
=== Sedgwick County Republican Party ===
O'Donnell has been the chair of the Sedgwick County Young Republicans

=== Bel Aire mayor candidacy ===
In 2005, during his sophomore year in college, at age 20, O'Donnell ran, unsuccessfully, for mayor, in his hometown of Bel Aire, Kansas (a suburb of Wichita) – finishing second in a four-person mayoral race. However, in the same race, his mother – Peggy O'Donnell – won a seat on the City Council.

=== Wichita City Council ===
In 2007, O'Donnell ran for Wichita City Council, but was disqualified, and removed from the ballot, because he did not actually live in Wichita (despite claiming a parsonage of his father's church, in Wichita, as his residence).

In another attempt, April 2011, O'Donnell was elected to the Wichita City Council, representing District 4 (southwest Wichita), a district of about 60,000 residents. The victory came despite his endorsements of his opponent, Joshua Blick, from the district's current Council member, the Mayor, and the local newspaper, and higher campaign spending by his opponent. O'Donnell was boosted by endorsements from two Republicans for whom he'd previously worked: former Kansas's 4th congressional district Congressman Todd Tiahrt and former Wichita Mayor Bob Knight.

In city politics, O'Donnell expressed opposition to taxpayer-funded incentives for business developments, and argued for better roads in his district.

While on the City Council, O'Donnell ran for Kansas Senate, and won in November 2012 – resigning his seat on the City Council in 2013 to accept his seat in the Kansas Senate.

=== Kansas Senate ===
In 2013, O'Donnell resigned from the Wichita City Council to take a seat in the Kansas Senate, representing the 25th District from 2013 until 2017. O'Donnell reported he was recruited for the role by Republican Kansas Senator Susan Wagle (later the Kansas Senate President).

Elected to the seat, O'Donnell defeated a moderate-Republican three-term incumbent, Jean Schodorf, in the primary election on August 7, 2012, by a 58.8%-to-41.2% margin. In the 2012 Republican Primary, Senator Schodorf, and Senate President Stephen Morris and six other state senate moderates were opposed by Governor Sam Brownback, the Kansas Chamber of Commerce and the Koch brothers. – part of an effort by the Governor to replace more-moderate senators with more-conservative senators. At the time, Schodorf was the Majority Whip.

In the general election on November 6, 2012, O'Donnell beat Democrat Tim Snow by 263 votes, 46.6% to 45.3%, with Libertarian Dave Thomas garnering 8% of the vote.

O'Donnell was Chair of Regulatory Boards and Commissions, a member of Ethics and Elections, and Vice-chair of Education Budget, Legislative Post Audit, and Public Health and Welfare. Fellow Senator Susan Wagle reportedly described O'Donnell as a "team player" and "good communicator."

While in the Kansas Senate, O'Donnell championed tax relief for south Wichita tornado victims, proposed a bill limiting welfare recipients to a maximum of 36 months of payments, and advocated for the elimination of sales tax on food. However, all of the legislation sponsored by O'Donnell died in the Kansas House or Senate, except for general statements of congratulations, support, and commendation.

O'Donnell chose not to run as an incumbent for this seat after one term, and he was succeeded in the seat by Democrat Lynn Rogers.

=== Sedgwick County Commission ===
Anticipating that 2nd District Sedgwick County Commissioner Tim Norton – a four-term Democratic incumbent – would not run for re-election, O'Donnell, in December 2015, moved from County Commission District 3 to District 2, and filed to run for Norton's seat. Norton, however, did run for re-election – but in November 2016, O'Donnell defeated Norton for the District 2 seat.

On February 15, 2018, Michael O'Donnell was rated 100% by American Conservative Union (Positions (State Legislatures)).

In August, O'Donnell, despite his legal difficulties, won his 2020 Republican primary for County Commission over Cindy Miles and Kathleen Garrison.

November 3, 2020 – after a general election race complicated by embarrassing revelations that compelled him to promise to resign if re-elected – initial returns indicated O'Donnell narrowly defeating Democrat Sarah Lopez (51%-to-49%, a margin of 576 votes), according to unofficial returns. Lopez, however, announced she would refrain from conceding defeat until the final count was certified. As additional ballots were counted over the next two days, O'Donnell's lead narrowed to just 32 votes (15,852 to 15,820). with an additional 8,000-10,000 ballots yet to be counted throughout the county. Ballot counting continued, and by 6:13 pm CT Friday, Lopez had closed the gap, and was ahead by 125 votes.

Friday, November 13, 2020, Sedgwick County District Attorney Marc Bennett advised O'Donnell that his investigation found grounds for initiating ouster proceedings against O'Donnell, and warned O'Donnell that he would begin such proceedings the following week.

In response, by e-mail to fellow County Commissioners, O'Donnell immediately announced his resignation.

In the final count, Democrat Sara Lopez won by 264 votes.

=== Lobbyist ===
In 2023, O'Donnell registered as a lobbyist with the Kansas Legislature, reportedly representing the interests of various major and minor Kansas-area businesses. His officially reported clients include:

- Evergy, the state's main electric utility (which also serves parts of Missouri);
- Steven Enterprises, a large Wichita-area family commercial conglomerate;
- Phoenix Home Care and Hospice, a medical and counseling service in Illinois, Missouri and Kansas;
- Paul Treadwell, a major Wichita mobile home investor; and
- Kansas Natural Remedies, LLC, a hemp producer.

The street address on O’Donnell’s lobbyist registration form was reportedly, originally, a Steven's Genesis Health Club, and his email was a genesishealthclubs.com account. Both were apparently revised to eliminate reference to Genesis, immediately upon online publication of an expose' published in the Wichita Eagle, which cited the connections.

== Controversies ==
=== Wichita City Council residency disqualification ===
In 2007, O'Donnell ran for Wichita City Council, to represent the council district that covered southwest Wichita. O'Donnell claimed to live in the district, at the former parsonage house of a church where his father was pastor. However, O'Donnell was disqualified, and removed from the ballot, when it was discovered that he did not actually live there, nor in Wichita, at all – but rather lived where he was registered to vote: in his parents' home in the suburb of Bel Aire, northeast of the city, miles away from the Wichita City Council district he sought to represent.

=== Wichita property taxes ===
In April 2011, when O'Donnell was elected to the Wichita City Council, controversy again arose over his residence. His reported residence – again, the parsonage of Grace Baptist Church (for whom his father was a pastor) – was reportedly provided to him rent-free. Because the house was not, therefore, serving as a church parsonage, it was not tax-exempt, and O'Donnell was subsequently ordered to pay over $2,000 in back property taxes.

=== Illegal alcohol to minors allegation ===
In early March 2016, Wichita police announced they would investigate allegations that O’Donnell (then a 31-year-old Kansas state senator) had purchased alcohol for underage students at Wichita State University. O'Donnell acknowledged to the Wichita Eagle newspaper that he had provided money for alcohol at the party – and later admitted to actually buying two cases of beer – for a woman's 21st birthday party, at a university fraternity, but said he had assumed all participants would be 21 years old. In another account, to the Topeka Capital-Journal newspaper, O'Donnell said he had taken "liquor" to a party.

Wichita police later announced it was dropping the investigation, "due to lack of evidence and elements of a crime," and owing to an uncooperative witness – refusing further comment.

The incident, and police response, became a topic of controversy and debate during O'Donnell's campaign for Sedgwick County Commissioner against incumbent Tim Norton

=== Alcohol in the church school van ===
In August 2017, allegations arose that O'Donnell took a school van from the Wichita-area Sunrise Christian Academy, to celebrate his 33rd birthday at a Kansas City Royals baseball game, over 200 miles away, where he was reportedly seen with 7 to 10 young men in the van. Earlier, the van had been photographed on August 5 in the stadium parking lot, containing whiskey and a case of beer. Despite the school's assertion that it had not authorized the use, its denial of responsibility, and its policy against drinking alcohol, and its brief online expression of regret over the incident, the school's superintendent declined to acknowledge whether the van had been operated by O'Donnell (who also refused to comment on the incident). O'Donnell's father (a pastor), and his mother (a teacher), were connected with the school – which O'Donnell had attended years earlier.

=== Federal investigation and FBI wiretap ===
On February 14, 2017, it was reported that O'Donnell's cell phone had been wiretapped by the FBI in 2015. On the same day, Wichita businessman Brandon Steven confirmed that he was the subject of a federal investigation related to his involvement in high-stakes poker and the proposed development of Castle Rock Casino. It is unclear whether the two incidents are related.

=== Federal indictments for wire fraud and money laundering ===
On May 4, 2018, while serving as Sedgwick County Commissioner, O'Donnell was indicted on federal charges including 23 counts of wire fraud and three counts of money laundering. He remained free on a $5,000 secured bond. The charges related to his successful campaign for the Kansas Senate seat.

</ref> The indictment stated that over months in 2015 and 2016, O'Donnell wrote checks from his campaign funds to three of his friends, who cashed them totaling $10,500. Prosecutors charged that O'Donnell's friends did little or no campaign work to earn the payments. Furthermore, the indictment maintains that at least $2,000 from the cashed checks was deposited into O'Donnell's personal account. (note: This indictment only lists 12 counts.)

On March 4, 2019, O'Donnell was acquitted of 21 counts of money laundering. The jury was hung on five charges, including two counts of wire fraud and three counts of money laundering. The decisions on all of the federal charges were based on whether O'Donnell's intent in violating campaign finance rules was "knowingly and intentionally" to defraud the public, rather than just routine campaign finance violations. Federal Judge Eric Melgren granted the request of prosecutors to dismiss the two remaining counts of wire fraud and three counts of money laundering "without prejudice." That gives the Department of Justice the ability to file the charges again in the future.

=== County Commission opponent's residency ===
During his 2020 campaign for re-election to the Sedgwick County Commission, O'Donnell raised allegations that his Democratic opponent, Sarah Lopez, was not actually a resident of Sedgwick County District 2, which they both sought to represent.

A former employee of O'Donnell's campaign, KNSS (AM) radio host John Whitmer, took the allegation further, filing an official complaint with the county election office – Sedgwick County's first official election residency challenge since O'Donnell had been disqualified in the 2007 Wichita City Council race (for not actually residing in Wichita).

However, a panel of three Sedgwick County officials – Sheriff, District Attorney, and Chief Deputy Election Commissioner (all Republicans) – investigated and determined that Lopez was a proper resident of the district, and could remain on the ballot, stating further that:

- "There is no evidence whatever that she does not live in the district" ~Sherriff Jeff Easter
- "I’ve not heard anything myself to suggest that we have evidence that Ms. Lopez was not and is not a resident of District II" ~District Attorney Marc Bennett

The panel – criticizing the allegation as unfounded and made without due diligence by Whitmer – assessed investigation costs against him, as a deterrent to future frivolous claims. The chief district attorney's investigator also debunked claims O'Donnell made regarding Lopez's living arrangement.

=== Altered photo in an attack ad ===
During O'Donnell's 2020 bid for re-election to the Sedgwick County Commission, his campaign ran an attack ad against his general election opponent, Democrat Sarah Lopez, that portrayed her as an anti-police activist – showing a photo of her at a Black Lives Matter event. The photo, originally taken by the Wichita Eagle newspaper (and used without their permission), had originally shown Lopez standing with Wichita Police Chief Gordon Ramsay, who had joined the peaceful local demonstration, both praying, heads bowed – but, in O'Donnell's ad, the image of the police chief standing beside her was cropped or blotted out, replaced with a caption saying Lopez "WON’T DEFEND OUR POLICE...AND WON'T STAND WITH OUR POLICE." The ad ran on local television and social media.

A mailer for O'Donnell also altered the photo – replacing the chief's image with a burning Los Angeles police car. It was distributed by the state Republican party, with text claiming Black Lives Matter is a "domestic terrorist organization."

Lopez dismissed the altered photos and denied all accusations in the mailer – noting that she was "quite against riots," and appreciated Chief Ramsay's role in preventing racial violence locally.

=== Defamation conspiracy charges in mayoral race ===
==== Investigation and charges ====
In 2019, Wichita Mayoral candidate Brandon Whipple, a Democrat, opposed the incumbent Mayor Jeff Longwell, a Republican, in an officially non-partisan race. During the race, an attack ad from an anonymous source – identified only as an obscure organization, "Protect Wichita Girls, LLC" – aimed against Whipple, alleged that Whipple had been involved in sexual harassment of legislative interns while he was a state representative. – allegations later debunked.

Whipple, successful in his mayoral bid, began legal proceedings alleging illegal defamation, and in February 2020 – represented by the area's former U.S. Attorney, Randy Rathbun – brought suit against the person who produced the video, Matthew Colborn (who, at some point in these events, was O'Donnell's campaign manager), and the group calling itself "Protect Wichita Girls." In the process, Whipple's attorney issued a subpoena for e-mails between O'Donnell and Sedgwick County Republican Party Chair Dalton Glasscock.

In October 2020, through Rathbun, Whipple amended the defamation and conspiracy lawsuit to include Commissioner O'Donnell and two other Wichita-area Republican politicians – Kansas State Representative Michael Capps and Wichita City Councilman James Clendenin – as defendants. Allegations cited were that the alleged co-conspirators tried to blame their elaborate, interstate conspiracy on Sedgwick County Republican Chairman Dalton Glasscock, and further that, with false accusations, they intended to generate marital discord within Whipple's own family.

The amended lawsuit further alleged that O'Donnell wrote the script for the false ad, Clendenin raised money for promoting it, and Capps attempted to hide their identities by creating a cover organization in New Mexico.

O'Donnell’s attorney reacted by filing a response in the case, denying O'Donnell was directly involved in the ad, and requesting the case be resolved by a jury trial.

==== Audio recording revelations ====
O'Donnell continued to deny any involvement, saying to KWCH-TV Eyewitness News, on camera (broadcast that October 14, 2020):

"I’m a conservative Republican. This is nothing more than a political hit job... On my father’s grave, I had nothing to do with this video, and we are going to be filing a lawsuit as well."

However, nine days later, on October 23, 2020, a secret audio recording emerged of a meeting of the alleged conspirators, with their video producer, Colburn (who secretly recorded the meeting), discussing the attack ad project and cover-up. Extensive excerpts of the recording were published in the local newspaper and played on local television, showing that the three Republicans had, indeed, conspired largely as alleged, with O'Donnell heard saying:

"Like I’ve always learned in politics, it’s always avoid the truth at all expense, right? And just go on the attack."

Whole copies and excerpts (audio and print), of the secret recording, were published online by local media, including the region's main newspaper, the Wichita Eagle and Wichita's CBS-TV affiliate KWCH-TV.

==== Removal or resignation demands ====
The revelation prompted immediate condemnations from throughout the Wichita area, including calls from three of his four fellow County Commissioners (mostly Republican) for O'Donnell to resign, and withdraw from the re-election race.

Similar demands were made by the Sedgwick County Republican Party, which announced on social media, October 24, 2020:

"This week’s events bring to a head the malicious and dishonest actions of Michael Capps, Michael O'Donnell, and James Clendenin over the past year. We have stated from the beginning that this type of politics and actions would not be supported by the Sedgwick County Republican Party. We have said, and repeat, that those involved in this video ad campaign and the misinformation campaign are not fit to serve in public office and should step down."

The Wichita Regional Chamber of Commerce, and its political action committee (which had previously backed O'Donnell), concurred.

October 26, 2020, U.S. Congressman Ron Estes – a Wichita Republican who represented Kansas's 4th congressional district (which included the districts of O'Donnell, Capps, and Clendenin) – called for their resignations. On October 31, O'Donnell announced that he was dropping out of the November 3, 2020, Sedgwick County Commission election.

==== Official actions in response ====
===== Investigation =====
October 25–26, the Sedgwick County District Attorney announced a joint investigation – by his office, the Wichita Police Department and the Sedgwick County Sheriff’s Department – into whether O'Donnell and his co-conspirators could be forced from public office. State statutes prevent the legal ouster of a state official within 180 days before the end of their term in office, or within 120 days after its start – with the result that O'Donnell, and co-conspirator Capps (who had also run for re-election but lost in the primary election) were immune from normal ouster proceedings until the end of their terms, and O'Donnell – if re-elected in the pending general election – would be immune from such proceedings during the first 120 days of his new term.

One of the Commissioners calling for O'Donnell's resignation expressed concern that his resignation or forced departure, so close to the November 3rd general election, might be irrelevant if O'Donnell were to win re-election – a particular concern since early voting had already begun before the revelation of the recording of O'Donnell's conspiratorial meeting.

===== Wichita City Council response =====
During the next weekly Wichita City Council meeting, October 27, 2020, the council voted 5-0 to censure their fellow Council member, Clendinin. (Clendenin and Mayor Whipple recused themselves from the discussion and vote.) However, the council remained divided on whether to call for Clendenin to resign.

The Council also voted to condemn O'Donnell and Capps for their roles in the plot.

Following the late-November court filing by the Sedgwick County District Attorney, to seek Clendenin's ouster for illegal misconduct – and the DA's December revelation that Clendenin was under investigation for misuse of federal CARES Act funds – Clendenin, at the December 22, 2020, City Council meeting, submitted his resignation, effective December 31, 2020.

===== Sedgwick County Commission response =====
The next day, the Sedgwick County Commission unanimously (O'Donnell abstaining) passed a resolution censuring O'Donnell and formally requesting his resignation. The resolution also said that if O'Donnell were to win re-election in the next week's election, he should decline to serve the new term.

O'Donnell, however, said afterward that he had no plans to step down at that time. He admitted raising money "for billboards" that "was spent on the video" and colluding on a cover-up as documented in the revealed audio recording – admitting it was "stupid" and "wrong" – and apologized to the Commission and the people of his district.

But he continued to deny involvement in the development of the slanderous video ad, itself – refusing to resign – though adding: "If it comes to light that I was responsible for the script or production or initiation of that project, I will absolutely do it."

=== O'Donnell pledges to refrain from 2nd term if elected ===
October 31, 2020 – three days before the general election – O'Donnell posted a message to his Facebook page pledging that, if re-elected, he would not serve the new term, and would allow the Sedgwick County Republican Party to select his replacement:

"After much prayer and consideration I’ve realized my candidacy is too much of a distraction and have arrived at the difficult decision to announce that I will not accept a 2nd term as county commissioner, if elected. This would allow the Republican precinct members to select a replacement. This seat is much more important than any one person. Our community deserves a commissioner committed to conservative values and policies that reflect our district."

Immediately afterward, the Sedgwick County Republican Party posted, on its Facebook page, that:

"We welcome the news of Michael O;Donnell II’s decision to not accept a second term in office. ...
"We continue to urge Michael Capps and James Clendenin to take responsibility for their actions. This needs to end today.
"Pursuant to Kansas Statute 25-3902, the new chairman to be elected at our November 5th reorganization meeting will call a special convention to select the replacement for this seat, should Michael O'Donnell win, by the Republican precinct captains of District 2."

In interviews, O'Donnell elaborated that his "goal" in this pledge was "to keep this seat in Republican hands," – but he would not indicate when he would resign.

==== Backlash ====
However, O'Donnell's opponent, Democrat Sarah Lopez, expressed skepticism – echoed by O'Donnell's fellow County Commissioner, Lacey Cruse, Democrat – both expressing concern (based on O'Donnell's previous statements and conduct) that he will not actually resign if he wins.

The state's principal newspaper, Wichita Eagle – despite endorsing some Republicans (including Congressman Ron Estes and O'Donnell's fellow commissioner David Dennis) in the current election – responded immediately with an editorial, saying "we're supposed to trust him?" dismissing O'Donnell's "last-gasp maneuver" as "business as usual" for a "disgraced elected official" – accusing him of "once again avoiding the truth" and resorting to an "attack" – urging the public to "send a loud-and-clear message" by rejecting him at the polls.

=== Investigation findings ===
November 13, 2020, Sedgwick County District Attorney (DA) Marc Bennett, in conference with O'Donnell and his attorney, advised O'Donnell that #Investigation the DA's investigation had found grounds for ouster proceedings, and warned O'Donnell that they would begin the following week.

=== Resignation and replacement ===
==== Resignation ====
November 13, 2020 – upon receiving DA Bennett's warning that ouster proceedings would begin against O'Donnell promptly – O'Donnell immediately resigned from the Sedgwick County Commission.

==== Replacement ====
November 30, 2020, the Sedgwick County Republican Party voted to replace the resigned O'Donnell with the person he had allegedly attempted to frame for the false attack ad: former Sedgwick County Republican Chairman Dalton Glasscock. Glasscock was selected to serve out the remaining few weeks of O'Donnell's term, until O'Donnell's re-election opponent, victorious Sarah Lopez, took office in January, 2021.

== Personal life ==
O'Donnell, in his youth, attended Wichita's Sunrise Christian Academy, where his mother was a teacher, and with which his father was affiliated.

O'Donnell's father, Michael "Pastor Mike" O'Donnell, Sr., was pastor of Grace Baptist Church, in Wichita. He died in February 2020, on a visit to Miami, Florida.

His mother, Peggy O'Donnell, served on the Bel Aire City Council. She was elected in the same 2005 election in which her son had unsuccessfully attempted to get elected Bel Aire mayor.
