= Wink Hartman =

American businessman and politician

Personal details
- Born: Willis Edward Hartman; February 1, 1946 (age 80) Wichita, Kansas, U.S.
- Party: Republican
- Spouse: Elizabeth Keever "Libba" Hartman
- Education: BA
- Alma mater: Wichita State University

Willis Edward "Wink" Hartman (born February 1, 1946) is an American businessman and political candidate from the state of Kansas.

== Early life ==
Born in Wichita, Kansas, Hartman attended Wichita Southeast High School, class of 1964, and graduated from Wichita State University.

== Business career ==
Hartman's grandfather founded Hartman Oil Co. Before Hartman inherited the company, he gained experience working for the Derby Oil Company, Xerox Corporation, and Del Monte Foods. He purchased a controlling interest in Hartman Oil from his father in 1990. He opened restaurants in Wichita, El Dorado, Kansas and Lawrence, Kansas.

Hartman founded the Wichita Wild, an indoor football team, in 2007.

Hartman was the co-owner of the Indycar team, Sarah Fisher Hartman Racing, along with former driver Sarah Fisher from 2012 to 2014 when it merged with Ed Carpenter Racing to create CFH Racing. Hartman and Fisher later sold their shares in the team to former race car driver Carpenter.

Hartman mentioned alleged harassment by customers and locals, which was not confirmed by his employees. He associated the claimed acts with his candidacy as Kobach's running mate at his two Jimmy's Eggs Lawrence restaurants in which he said he had invested about $1.5 million. Hartman closed them suddenly without giving his employees any prior notice. A manager who worked at both restaurants said she never witnessed any hostile acts, but staff at both locations had not expected them to succeed financially. Hartman had also closed two Jimmy's Eggs restaurants in Wichita.

== Politics ==
Hartman ran unsuccessfully to represent Kansas's 4th congressional district in the United States House of Representatives in the 2010 elections.

In 2011, Hartman hired Michael O'Donnell, for a marketing job at which O'Donnell worked part-time, during the same year O'Donnell was running for Wichita City Council.

In February 2017, Hartman declared his candidacy for Governor of Kansas in the 2018 election. After loaning it $1.6 million, he ended his gubernatorial campaign in February 2018, endorsing Kansas Secretary of State Kris Kobach. The next month, Kobach selected Hartman as his Lieutenant Gubernatorial candidate. The joint ticket of Kobach and Hartman was defeated by the Democratic ticket of state Senators Laura Kelly and Lynn Rogers, 48.0% to 43.0%, with the Independent ticket of Greg Orman and Republican state Senator John Doll, finishing third with 6.5%.

In January 2019, Hartmann announced that he was "seriously considering entering the race" in 2020 for the open United States Senate seat to replace Pat Roberts but ultimately did not do so.

== Personal life ==
Hartman and his wife Libba live in Rose Hill, Kansas on a 600-acre (240 ha) ranch outside of Wichita.

Party political offices
Preceded by Jeff Colyer	Republican nominee for Lieutenant Governor of Kansas; 2018	Succeeded by Katie Sawyer
