= Ed Carpenter (racing driver) =

American racing driver (born 1981)

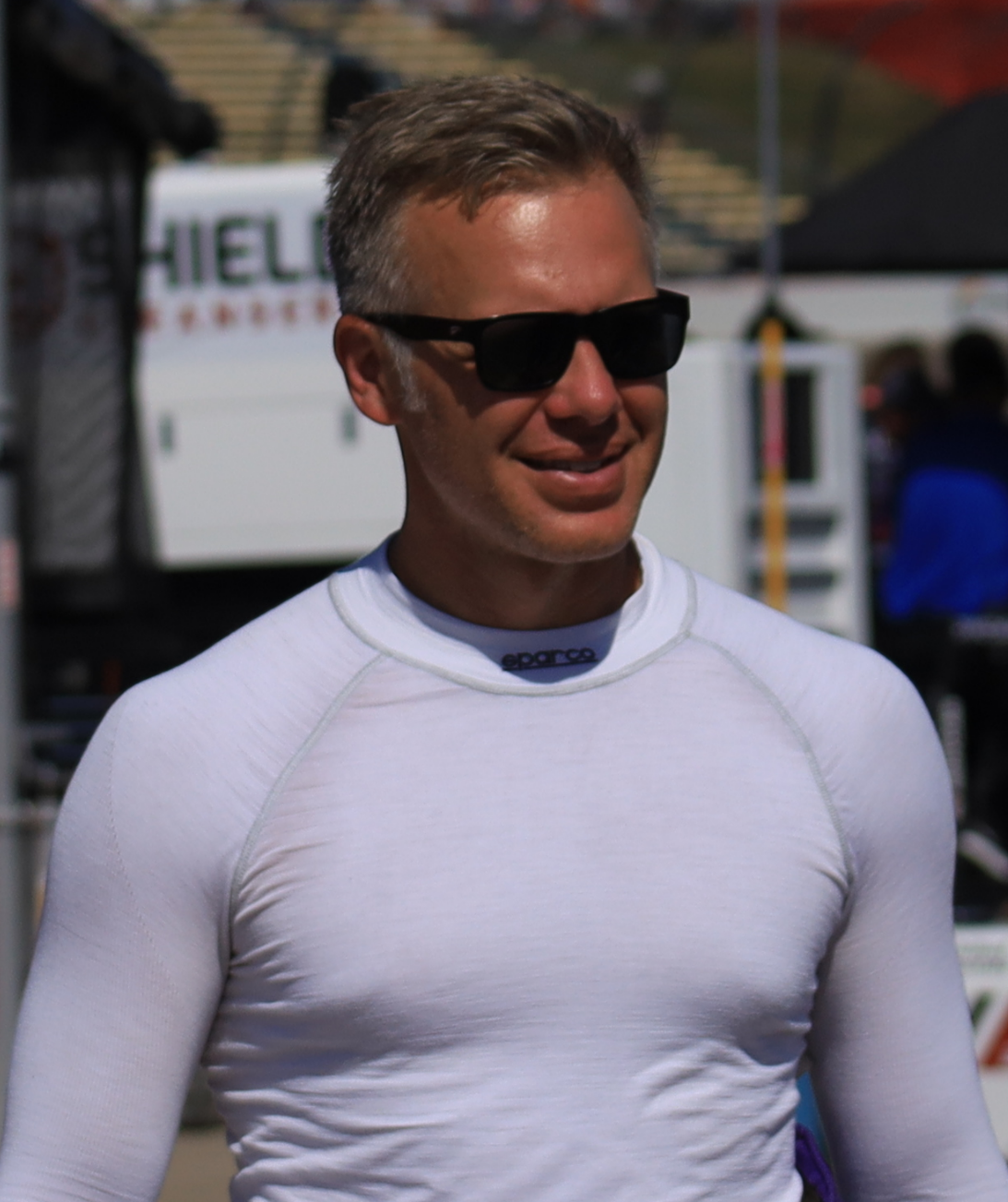
- Carpenter in 2022
- Nationality: (United States) American
- Born: Everette Edward Carpenter, Jr. March 3, 1981 (age 45); Paris, Illinois, United States

IndyCar Series career
- 207 races run over 23 years
- Team: No. 20 (Ed Carpenter Racing)
- Best finish: 12th (2009)
- First race: 2003 Delphi Indy 300 (Chicagoland)
- Last race: 2026 Indianapolis 500 (Indianapolis)
- First win: 2011 Kentucky Indy 300 (Kentucky)
- Last win: 2014 Firestone 600 (Texas)
| Wins | Podiums | Poles |
|---|---|---|
| 3 | 9 | 4 |

Previous series
- 2002–2003, 2005 2007–2008: Indy Lights; Rolex Sports Car Series

Everette Edward Carpenter Jr. (born March 3, 1981) is an American auto racing driver, currently competing in the IndyCar Series for his team, Ed Carpenter Racing. He is the stepson of Indy Racing League founder Tony George. He holds the joint-record for most Indy 500 starts without a win along with George Snider.

== Career history ==
Carpenter was born in Paris, Illinois, and grew up in the town of Marshall until the age of eight. He then moved to Indianapolis. He is a graduate of Butler University.

=== Early career ===
Carpenter has had a successful career in midget racing dating back to 1989. Carpenter would win national quarter-midget events in Xenia, Ohio and Hagerstown, Maryland in 1996.

=== United States Automobile Club ===
==== USAC Regional Series ====
Carpenter drove in the USAC Regional Series in 1998 in the midget division. Carpenter drove the No. 3 TG Racing car at 16th Street Speedway. At the track event on June 27, 1998, Carpenter qualified with the eleventh fastest time. Carpenter won the third heat race and finished the feature in third place.

==== USAC National Midget Car Series ====
Carpenter drove in the USAC National Midget Series in 1999 for TG Racing in the No. 3 Ed Pink Beast in fifteen races. Carpenter won a race at Louisville Motor Speedway and finished thirteenth in points. Carpenter returned in 2000 to drive the No. 3 TG Motorsports car. Carpenter achieved four top-five finishes with a best finish of second at the Belleville Nationals at the Belleville High Banks and finished ninth in the final point standings. In 2001, Carpenter drove the No. 2 Steele car at South Boston Speedway, where he started 11th and finished eighth. In 2002, Carpenter returned to the series to drive for Klatt Enterprises. Carpenter competed in three races and finished 44th in points.

==== USAC Silver Crown Series ====
Carpenter competed in the USAC Silver Crown Series in 2000. Carpenter originally competed for former Indy car driver George Snider in car No. 111 at the season-opening Copper World Classic at Phoenix International Raceway; Carpenter finished in ninth place to claim the Rookie of the Race award. Carpenter started driving for George Snider's relative Debbie Snider in the No. 7 Chevrolet-powered Beast, with George Snider and Jimmy Sills acting as mentors to him and giving him advice about tracks. Carpenter had a best finish of sixth in the Southern Illinoisan 100 at the DuQuoin State Fairgrounds Racetrack. Carpenter started on the pole position in the A. J. Foyt's True Value Hulman Hoosier Hundred at the Indiana State Fairgrounds Speedway, the series' most prestigious race. Carpenter led the first eighty laps before crashing and finishing in twentieth place. Carpenter also won the Rookie of the Race award at Nazareth Speedway with a seventh-place finish. Carpenter finished twelfth in the final point standings. In 2001, Carpenter returned to drive for George Snider in the No. 11 – numbered 111 at Gateway International Raceway – car. Carpenter's best finish was sixth at the Coca-Cola 100 at Indianapolis Raceway Park, and he finished ninth in the final point standings.

In 2002, Carpenter drove the No. 44 Sinden Racing car. At the season-opening Little Trees 100 at Phoenix, Carpenter started second and finished 21st after suffering an engine failure after 85 laps. Carpenter also drove for Hoffman Auto Racing in the No. 69 Dynamics car at the Golden Hoosier Hundred at the Indiana State Fairgrounds Speedway – starting seventeenth and finishing 24th due to a crash after 59 laps – and the No. 67 Zarounian car at the Ted Horn 100 at the DuQuoin State Fairgrounds Racetrack; Carpenter started from pole position and finished 25th due to an accident after 58 laps. Carpenter's best finish of the season was at the Dominic's of New York 100 at Richmond International Raceway where he started seventh and finished second, leading for twelve laps. Carpenter finished the season ranked 22nd in the final point standings. For 2003, Carpenter again drove for Hoffman Auto Racing in the No. 69 Dynamics car. Carpenter's best finish of 3rd place came at the Dominic's of New York 100 at Richmond after starting tenth. Carpenter finished 35th in the final point standings.

==== USAC Sprint Car Series ====
In 2001, Carpenter began competing in the USAC Sprint Car Series in the No. 1111 TG Racing car. At the season-ending USAC Sprint Legends Classic at Salem Speedway, Carpenter had the 3rd fastest qualifying time, finished sixth in the first heat and won the "Semi" race. In the feature race, Carpenter took the lead with ten laps to go and won. Carpenter finished twelfth in the final point standings. In 2002, Carpenter drove for Sinden Racing, where he took one win during the season, and finished nineteenth in the final point standings.

=== North American Auto Racing Series ===
In 2000, Carpenter competed in the North American Auto Racing Series-sanctioned NAMARS National Midget Championship series in the No. 3C TG Racing car. Carpenter attempted to qualify for the Chili Bowl at Tulsa Expo Center, considered to be the "biggest Midget race of the year". Carpenter failed to qualify for the qualifier and missed the feature race as a result.

=== IndyCar ===
==== Indy Lights Series ====
Carpenter joined the then-new Indy Racing League sanctioned Infiniti Pro Series in 2002, driving the No. 2 Sinden Racing car. At the season-opening Kansas 100 at Kansas Speedway, Carpenter started and finished fifth. Carpenter's best finish of second came in the Kentucky 100 at Kentucky Speedway, and he also achieved a pair of third-place finishes in the Michigan 100 at Michigan International Speedway and the Gateway 100 at Gateway International Speedway. Carpenter finished out the season ranked third, with 226 points. In 2003 Carpenter moved to A. J. Foyt Enterprises to drive the No. 14 car. Carpenter won his only Indy Lights race at the series' most prestigious race, the Futaba Freedom 100 at the Indianapolis Motor Speedway. Carpenter qualified on the pole position at the Aventis Racing for Kids 100 at Kansas Speedway and the Chicagoland 100 at Chicagoland Speedway, finishing second in each race. Carpenter again finished the season ranked third, with 377 points. In 2005 Carpenter returned to the series for Vision Racing to drive the No. 9 car on a one-off basis; he competed at the Liberty Challenge on the road course at Indianapolis. Carpenter qualified thirteenth out of fourteen cars and finished eleventh, the last car on the lead lap; the result saw him finish 26th in the drivers' championship, with nineteen points.

==== IndyCar Series ====
Carpenter's first experience in the IndyCar Series came in 2001 at Atlanta Motor Speedway when he tested a car for Panther Racing.

===== 2003–2005 =====
In 2003, Carpenter began competing in the IndyCar Series for PDM Racing in the No. 18 Dallara-Chevrolet. Carpenter made his debut at the Delphi Indy 300 at Chicagoland Speedway; he started in sixteenth place and finished in thirteenth place. Carpenter then competed at the Toyota Indy 400 at California Speedway, starting in seventeenth place and finishing in thirteenth place, two laps down. At the season-ending Chevy 500 at Texas Motor Speedway, Carpenter started in 22nd place and finished in 21st place due to alternator problems after completing 69 laps. Carpenter finished the season ranked in 26th place, with 43 points. In 2004, Carpenter ran his first full-time season for Red Bull Cheever Racing in the No. 52 Dallara-Chevrolet. At the season-opening Toyota Indy 300 at Homestead-Miami Speedway, Carpenter started in ninth place and finished in twelfth place. During the season, Carpenter struggled to match the results of teammate Alex Barron. Carpenter's best finish was eighth place at the Belterra Casino Indy 300 at Kentucky Speedway. Carpenter qualified for the Indianapolis 500, starting in sixteenth place and finishing in 31st place due to a crash after 62 laps. Carpenter finished the season in sixteenth place, with 245 points. For 2005, Carpenter's stepfather Tony George started a new team called Vision Racing after purchasing the equipment from Kelley Racing. Carpenter drove for the team in the No. 20 Dallara-Toyota. During the year, Carpenter and the team struggled; his best start was sixteenth place at the SunTrust Indy Challenge at Richmond International Raceway. Carpenter's best finish was at the Firestone Indy 200 at Nashville Superspeedway with a tenth-place finish, one lap down. Carpenter qualified for the Indianapolis 500, starting in 26th place and finishing in eleventh place, one lap down. Carpenter finished the season in eighteenth place, with 244 points.

===== 2006 =====
Carpenter returned with Vision Racing in 2006 in the No. 20 Dallara-Honda. On March 26, 2006, during the warmup practice session for the season-opening Toyota Indy 300 at Homestead, Carpenter was involved in a crash with Paul Dana, who died soon after from his injuries. Carpenter was reported to be "awake and alert," airlifted to Jackson Memorial Hospital and was released the next day suffering bruised lungs. Carpenter returned to the series for the third race of the season, the Indy Japan 300 at Twin Ring Motegi, starting in nineteenth place and finishing in twentieth place due to a crash after 25 laps. At the Indianapolis 500, Carpenter and his teammates acquired sponsorship from Rock and Republic for the race. Carpenter started in twelfth place and ran in the top-ten late in the race; he finished eleventh, a lap down, after a late-race pit stop. At the following race, the Watkins Glen Indy Grand Prix at Watkins Glen International, Carpenter started in eighteenth place and finished in sixth place after his team decided to put on rain tires for the wet conditions. At the Firestone Indy 400 at Michigan International Speedway, Carpenter started in fourth place and finished in seventh place. At the season-ending Peak Antifreeze Indy 300 at Chicagoland, Carpenter started in twelfth place and finished in fifth place. Carpenter finished the season ranked in fourteenth place, with 252 points.

===== 2007 =====
In 2007, Carpenter again competed with Vision Racing to drive the No. 20 Dallara-Honda. Carpenter started off the season with a sixth-place finish at the season-opening XM Satellite Radio Indy 300 at Homestead. The team acquired sponsorship from Hitachi Power Tools for the Indianapolis 500 onwards. At Indianapolis, Carpenter started in 14th place and finished in seventeenth place after being involved in a crash with Marco Andretti, Dan Wheldon and others which resulted in Andretti flipping down the back straightaway. Just after the crash, the race was stopped due to rain. Carpenter's best finish in the remaining races was at the Iowa Corn Indy 250 at Iowa Speedway with a sixth-place finish after starting fifth. Carpenter finished the season ranked in fifteenth place, with 309 points.

===== 2008 =====
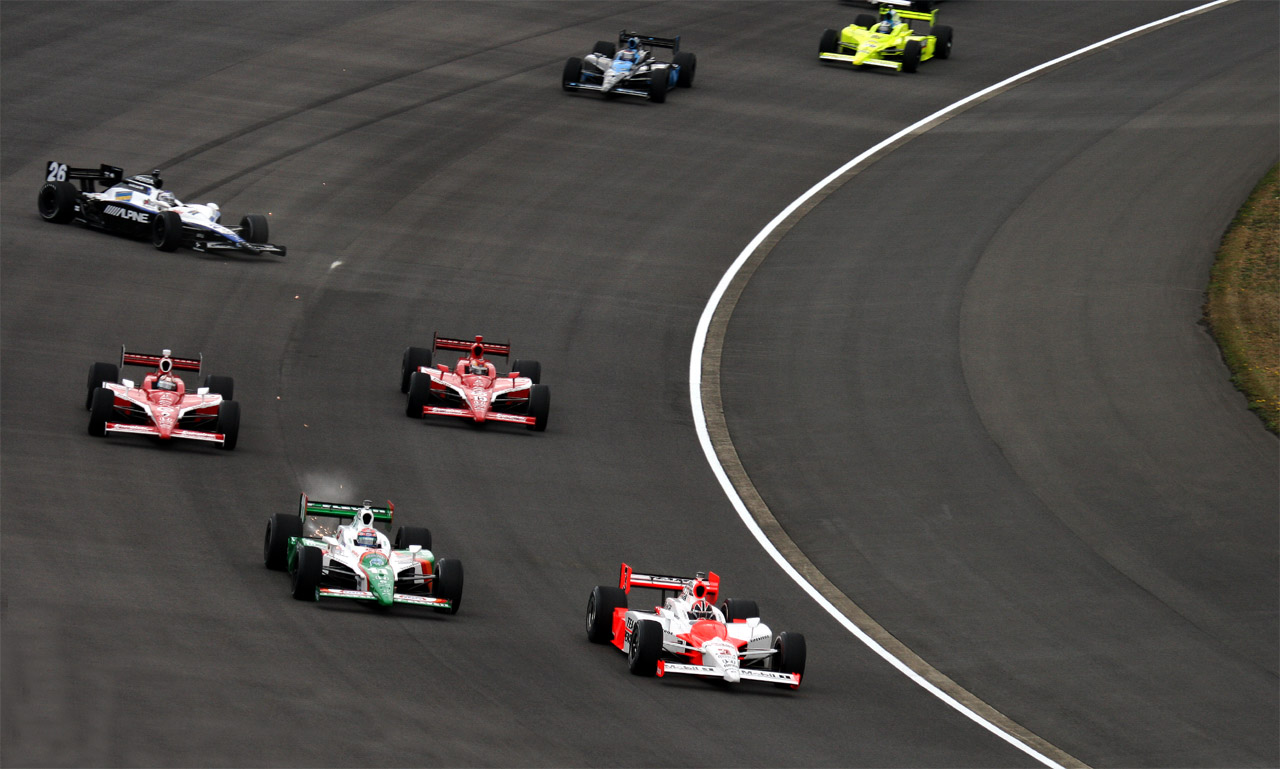
Carpenter (last car in picture) competing in the 2008 Indy Japan 300 at Twin Ring Motegi.

For 2008, Carpenter returned with Vision Racing to drive the No. 20 Dallara-Honda. At the season-opening Gainsco Auto Insurance Indy 300 at Homestead, Carpenter qualified in second place, but his time was nullified as his car – as well as the car of teammate A. J. Foyt IV – failed technical inspection. Despite starting at the rear, Carpenter worked his way through the order to finish in sixth place. Carpenter added another 6th-place finish at the Indy Japan 300 at Twin Ring Motegi. At the Indianapolis 500, Carpenter qualified in tenth place and finished in fifth place, leading three laps. After eight races, Carpenter ranked eighth in points, however, Carpenter only achieved top-ten finishes in the Firestone Indy 200 at Nashville and the Meijer Indy 300 at Kentucky. Carpenter finished out the year with a fiery crash in the Peak Antifreeze Indy 300 at Chicagoland while running in the top five. Carpenter finished the season ranked in fifteenth place, with 320 points.

===== 2009 =====
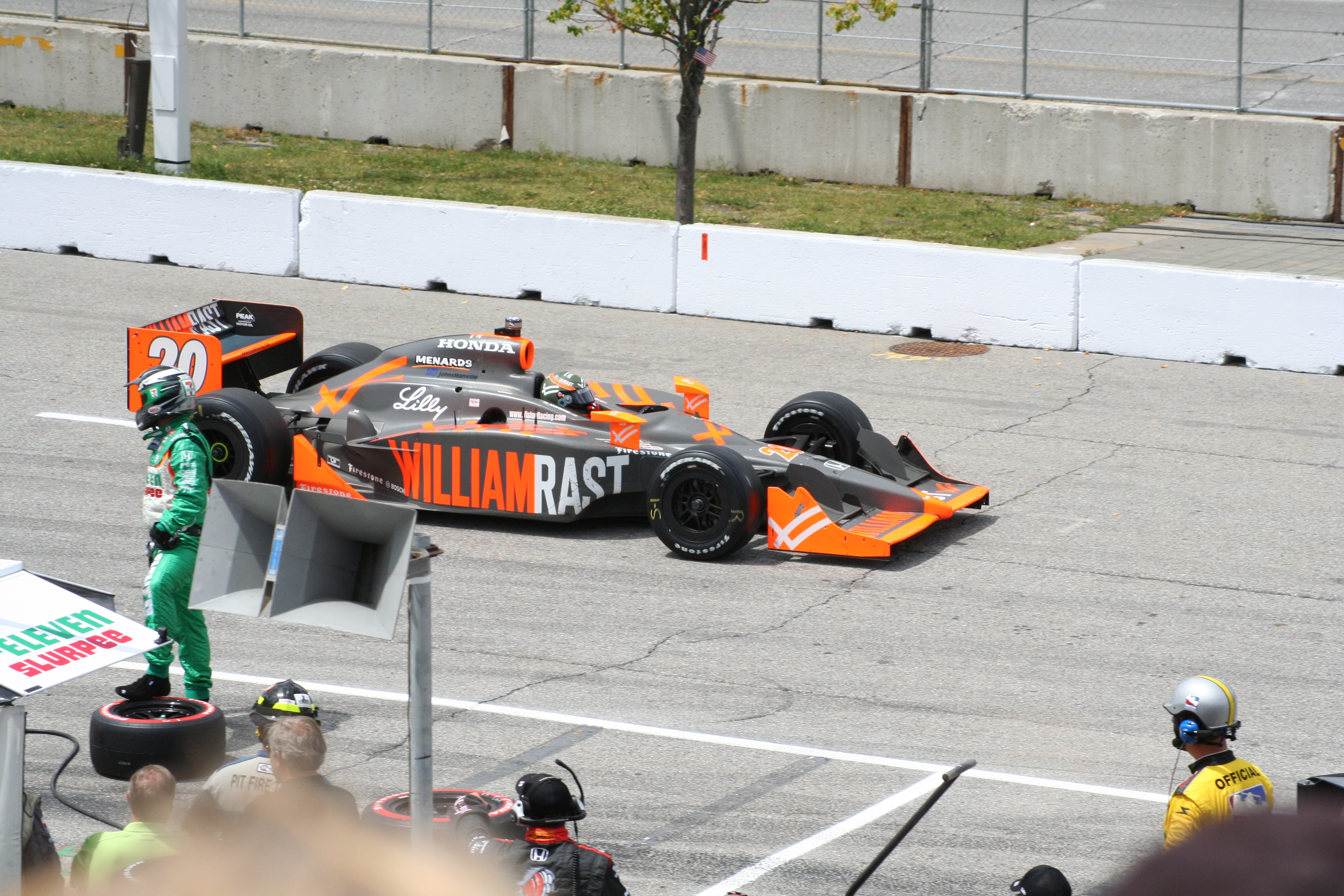
Carpenter competing in the 2009 Honda Indy Toronto at Exhibition Place.

In 2009, Carpenter returned with Vision Racing in the No. 20 Dallara-Honda and started with poor performances in the first two races – both street circuits – at the Honda Grand Prix of St. Petersburg and the Toyota Grand Prix of Long Beach. Carpenter then achieved back-to-back top-ten finishes on the ovals at the RoadRunner Turbo Indy 300 at Kansas Speedway with a ninth-place finish, and at the Indianapolis 500, Carpenter qualified in seventeenth place and finished in eighth place. The day after the ABC Supply Company A. J. Foyt 225 at the Milwaukee Mile – where Carpenter finished in sixteenth place, six laps down – Carpenter's wife Heather gave birth to their second child, Ryder. Carpenter got his best finish of the season at the Meijer Indy 300 at Kentucky, leading 34 laps before finishing 0.0162 seconds behind Ryan Briscoe following a pitched side-by-side battle. Carpenter finished out the season ranked in twelfth place, with 321 points.

===== 2010 =====
In 2010, Vision Racing lost its sponsors and as a result, shut down as a full-time team. Therefore, Carpenter drove for Panther Racing in conjunction with Vision Racing in the No. 20 Dallara-Honda at the Indianapolis 500. In the race, Carpenter started in eighth place and finished in seventeenth place due to a caution occurring during a round of pit stops, which put Carpenter a lap down. The two teams later fielded the car in the Peak Antifreeze & Motor Oil Indy 300 at Chicagoland, the Kentucky Indy 300 at Kentucky, and the season-ending Cafés do Brasil Indy 300 at Homestead. At Chicagoland, Carpenter started in eleventh place and quickly challenged for the lead, leading for three laps. Carpenter then had handling issues and retired with around twenty laps to go; he was scored in twentieth place. At Kentucky, Carpenter qualified on pole and led a front-row sweep with teammate Dan Wheldon. Carpenter led for eleven laps and almost achieved his first victory when cars ahead of him had to make pit stops late in the race; he ultimately finished in second place as Hélio Castroneves managed to conserve fuel to the end of the race without making another pit stop. At the season-ending race at Homestead, Carpenter started in seventh place and finished in thirteenth place, one lap down. Carpenter finished in 28th place in the drivers' championship with ninety points.

===== 2011 =====
For 2011, Carpenter moved to Sarah Fisher Racing, driving the No. 67 Dallara-Honda. The team competed in a partial season consisting of all the oval races and select road course and street circuit races. Carpenter made his season début at the Indianapolis 500, where he qualified in eighth place and finished in eleventh place after leading for three laps. In the Firestone Twin 275s at Texas Motor Speedway, Carpenter started the opening race in fifth place and finished in eighteenth place. For the second race, Carpenter drew a tenth place starting position – via a random draw – and finished in sixteenth place. Following the two Texas races, Carpenter and the team began to struggle in qualifying and Carpenter had a best start of fourteenth place at the Iowa Corn Indy 250 at Iowa. Carpenter further struggled on the non-oval races, which resulted in his best finishes being a trio of eleventh-place finishes at Indianapolis, Iowa and the MoveThatBlock.com Indy 225 at New Hampshire Motor Speedway. At the penultimate race of the season, the Kentucky Indy 300 at Kentucky, Carpenter started in fourth place and led for eight laps. In the late stages of the race, Carpenter battled with Chip Ganassi Racing's Dario Franchitti, who was in a championship battle with Will Power. Carpenter beat Franchitti by 0.0098 seconds – the series' closest finish at the track – to record his first series victory.

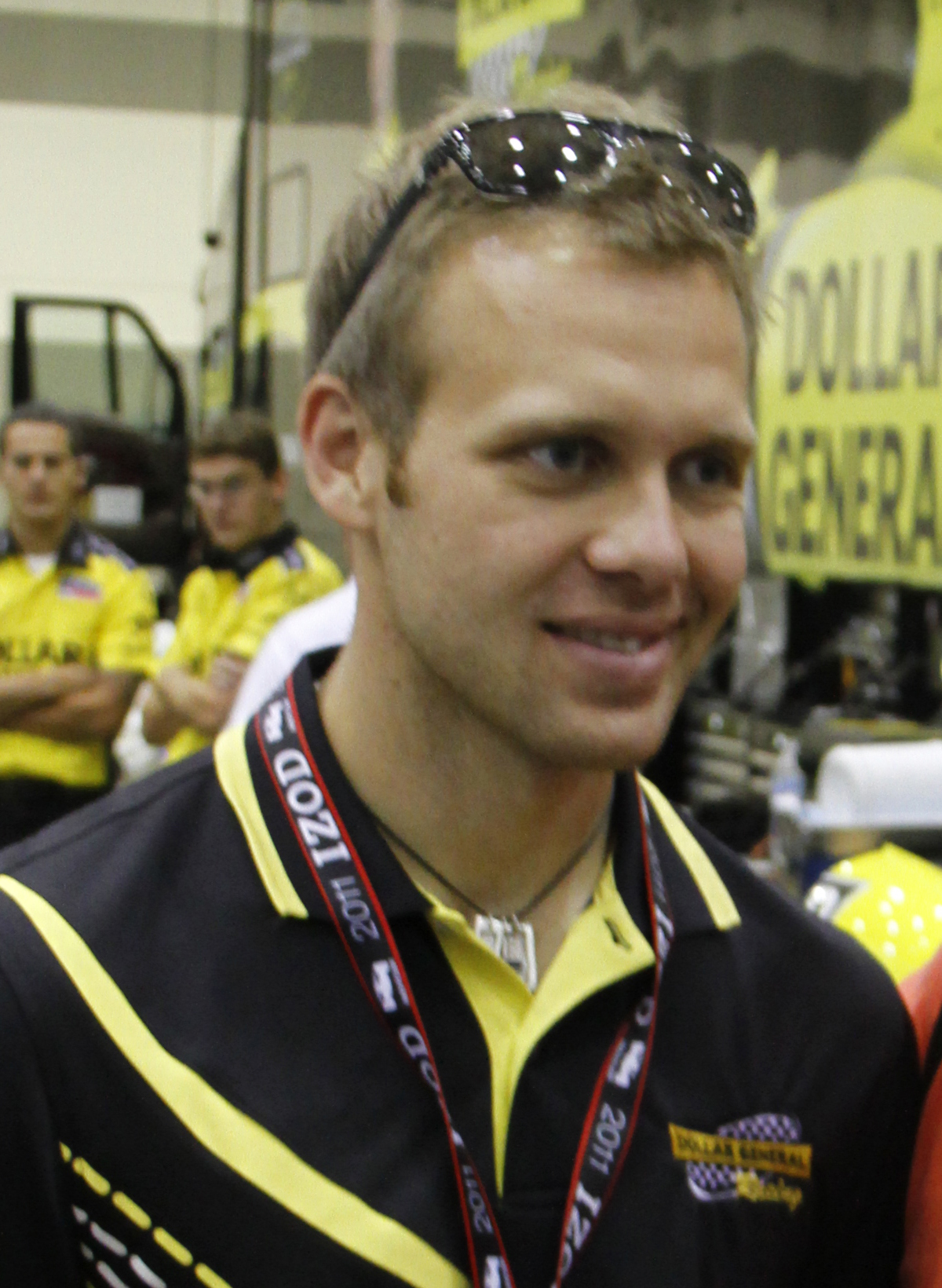
Carpenter at the 2011 Baltimore Grand Prix.

At the season-ending IZOD IndyCar World Championship at Las Vegas Motor Speedway, Carpenter started in third place and was soon running in second place to pole sitter Tony Kanaan after eleven laps, when a major accident occurred in turn one. Dan Wheldon was fatally injured during the crash. The race was canceled afterward, and with the results expunged, Carpenter finished the season ranked in 26th place, with 175 points. In the separate sub-classification for the oval races, Carpenter ranked sixth with 141 points.

===== 2012 =====
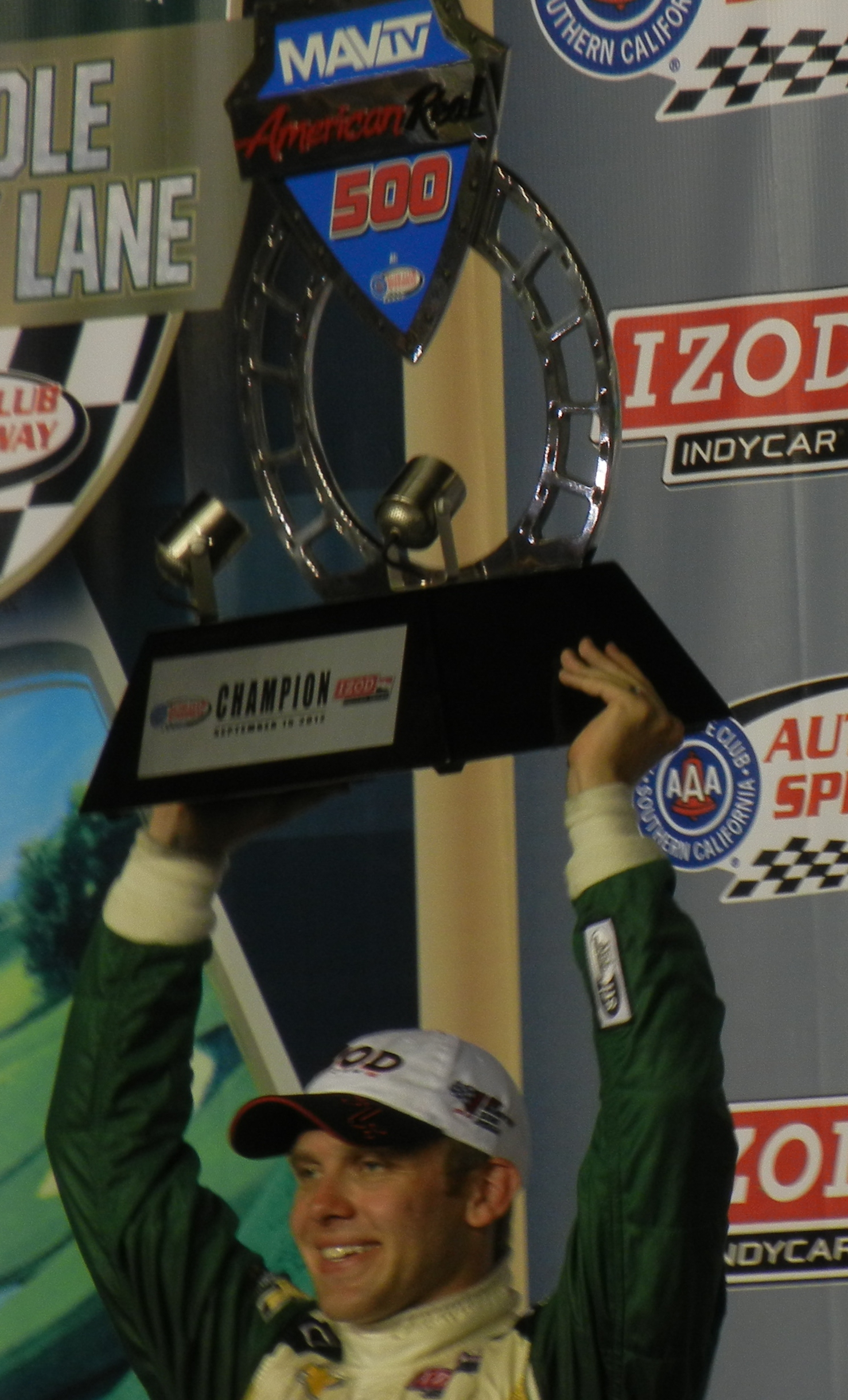
Carpenter after winning the 2012 MAVTV 500 IndyCar World Championships at Auto Club Speedway.

In 2012, Carpenter started his team, Ed Carpenter Racing, driving the No. 20 Dallara-Chevrolet. During the season, Carpenter struggled in qualifying and, in the first fourteen races of the season, had a best start of nineteenth in the Firestone 550 at Texas. Carpenter further struggled on non-oval races, resulting in a best finish of twelfth place at the Chevrolet Detroit Belle Isle Grand Prix at Belle Isle. On the ovals, Carpenter was more competitive; at the Indianapolis 500 Carpenter crashed during Pole Day qualifying and re-qualified on Bump Day. Carpenter started in 28th place and moved into the top five in the late stages of the race only to spin on lap 180, which took Carpenter out of contention; he finished in 21st place, one lap down. At Texas, Carpenter started in nineteenth place and quickly moved up through the field, only to finish in twelfth place after dropping back late in the race. At the Milwaukee IndyFest at the Milwaukee Mile, Carpenter started in 22nd place and finished in eighth place, his first top ten of the season. Carpenter had another eighth-place finish at the Iowa Corn Indy 250 at Iowa after starting in 21st place. Carpenter then started in eighth place at the Grand Prix of Baltimore but he crashed on lap seven of the race and was scored in 25th place. For the season-ending MAVTV 500 IndyCar World Championships at Auto Club Speedway, Carpenter started in fifth place and quickly challenged for the lead, which he held for 62 laps. Going into the last lap, Carpenter attempted to pass leader Dario Franchitti just as Takuma Sato lost control in turn four. Carpenter completed the pass before the caution came out, and as a result, achieved his second IndyCar win. Carpenter finished the season ranked in eighteenth place, with 261 points. Carpenter finished in seventh place in the sub-classification for oval races, with 133 points.

===== 2013 =====
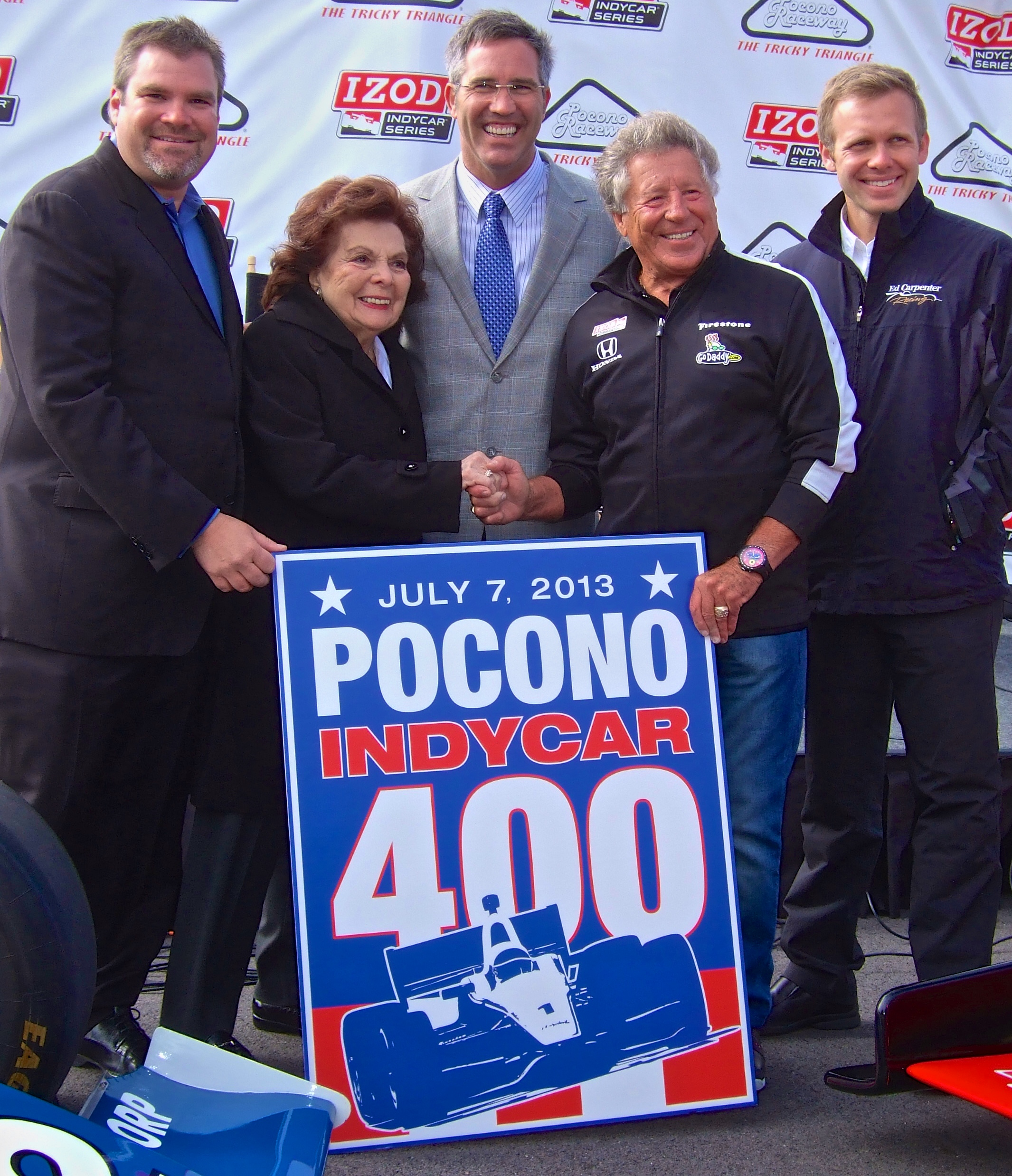
Carpenter (far right) was among the people that announced that Pocono Raceway would join the IndyCar Series in 2013.

Carpenter returned with ECR in 2013 to drive the No. 20 Dallara-Chevrolet. Carpenter improved his qualifying results on the ovals, with a worst start of fourteenth at the Pocono IndyCar 400 at Pocono Raceway. Despite this, Carpenter struggled away from the ovals, achieving a best start of fourteenth at the Itaipava São Paulo Indy 300, and a best finish of thirteenth in the opening race of the double-header in Toronto. On the ovals, Carpenter's results were significantly better, including pole position at the Indianapolis 500, where Carpenter's single-car team beat out all three cars fielded by Team Penske and all five cars fielded by Andretti Autosport, two of the largest teams in the series. In the race, Carpenter led for a race-high 37 laps, only to suffer handling issues in the second half of the race and dropped to a tenth-place finish. In the Firestone 550 at Texas, Carpenter qualified ninth and finished fourth. Carpenter's only disappointing oval race was the Milwaukee IndyFest at Milwaukee where Carpenter qualified twentieth and finished fourteenth, two laps down. At the Iowa Corn Indy 250 at Iowa, Carpenter started and finished fourth after leading for eighteen laps, being one of the few drivers to pose a threat to race winner James Hinchcliffe. Carpenter then finished ninth at Pocono, where the Chevrolet engines lacked the fuel economy of the rival Honda engines. Carpenter's next competitive race was at the season-ending MAVTV 500 IndyCar World Championships at Auto Club Speedway, where Carpenter started seventh and finished second after leading for a single lap. Carpenter finished the season ranked sixteenth, with 333 points.

===== 2014 =====
In 2014, Carpenter decided to split driving the No. 20 with Mike Conway; Conway drove the road courses and street circuits while Carpenter drove the ovals. At Carpenter's season debut, the Indianapolis 500, Carpenter qualified on pole position for the second consecutive year. In the race, Carpenter, Ryan Hunter-Reay, Hélio Castroneves and Marco Andretti dominated the lead with Carpenter leading for 26 laps. On lap 176 on a restart for separate crashes between Scott Dixon and Josef Newgarden, Carpenter was running second to Hunter-Reay when Townsend Bell went three-wide in an attempt to pass Carpenter on the outside while James Hinchcliffe was on the inside of Carpenter. Hinchcliffe made contact with Carpenter, sending both of them into the wall. This ended Carpenter's race with a 27th-place finish. At Carpenter's next race, the Firestone 600 at Texas, he qualified fifth and soon battled with Will Power for the lead. Later, when Carpenter and Power were making pit stops, Power came into the pit lane too fast and had to serve a penalty. On lap 142 a caution came out for Takuma Sato who had an engine fire. Carpenter and second place driver Juan Pablo Montoya stayed out while the remaining lead lap cars – Power, Simon Pagenaud, Dixon and Tony Kanaan – pitted to get new tires. On the restart, with three laps to go, Carpenter held off Power for his third career IndyCar Series win.

In the Pocono IndyCar 500 at Pocono, Carpenter started in thirteenth place and finished in the same position after having to make an extra pit stop to replace a tire. At the following race, the Iowa Corn Indy 300 at Iowa, Carpenter started in tenth place. During the race, Carpenter battled a loose car in the late stages of the race while running in the top-five. On lap 282 Carpenter made contact with Juan Pablo Montoya in turn three, causing Montoya to crash out of the race. During an interview with the NBC Sports Network, Montoya called Carpenter a "douchebag". During the caution period, Carpenter, Hunter-Reay, Newgarden, and Graham Rahal all made pit stops for new tires. On the restart, Hunter-Reay and Newgarden passed Kanaan, who had dominated the race up to that point, while Carpenter was able to finish up in the fifth position. During the weekend of the ABC Supply Wisconsin 250 at Milwaukee, it was announced that Ed Carpenter Racing was to merge with Sarah Fisher Hartman Racing for the 2015 season, to form CFH Racing. In the race, Carpenter started in seventh place and finished in ninth place. At the season-ending MAVTV 500 IndyCar World Championships at Auto Club Speedway, Carpenter nearly crashed on both of his laps in qualifying and therefore started in fourteenth place. During the race, Carpenter's pit speed limiter did not function properly, which resulted in a drive-through penalty for speeding on the pit lane. Carpenter recovered to finish in third place behind Chip Ganassi Racing teammates, Kanaan and Dixon. Carpenter finished 22nd in the final drivers' championship standings, with 262 points.

===== 2015 =====
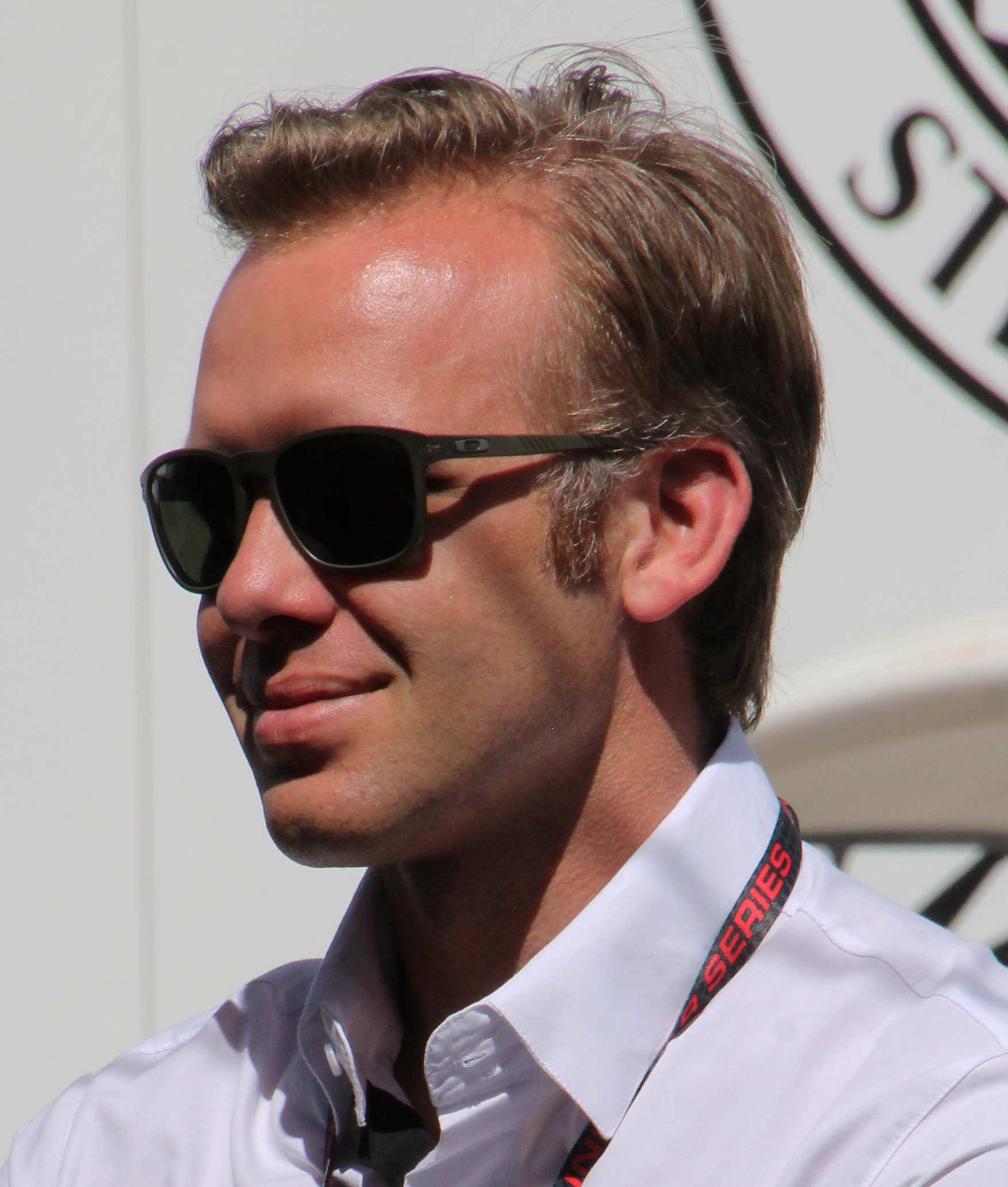
Ed Carpenter in 2015

For 2015, Carpenter again shared the No. 20 Dallara-Chevrolet entry; he contested the oval races, and Luca Filippi contested the non-oval races. Carpenter first competed at the Indianapolis 500. On the morning of Pole Day qualifying, Carpenter half-spun in turn two, and the left side of the car hit the outside wall. The car flipped over and slid down the back straightaway. Carpenter was unhurt in the incident, but as a result of the incident and similar crashes earlier in the month, the series decided to reduce the boost on cars. During this time, Carpenter's team prepared his backup car. Carpenter qualified twelfth for the race, in which he struggled and was running in the top-fifteen when he attempted to pass Oriol Servià for the position on lap 113. The two drivers made contact and crashed into the turn 1 wall and Carpenter was scored in thirtieth place. Carpenter then competed at the Firestone 600 at Texas; he started in fifteenth place and finished in 22nd place due to an engine failure after completing 147 laps. Two laps later, Carpenter's teammate Josef Newgarden also retired due to an engine failure. At the MAVTV 500 at Auto Club Speedway, Carpenter started in 4th place and was involved in a crash on the main straightaway with Newgarden on lap 158 and was scored in 22nd place. He then achieved finishes of tenth at Milwaukee, sixth at Iowa, and seventeenth at Pocono. As a result, he finished 27th in points. As of 2025, Carpenter is only competing in the Indy 500.

=== Grand-Am Rolex Sports Car Series ===
Carpenter competed in the Rolex 24 at Daytona in 2007 for Vision Racing in the No. 00 Porsche-Crawford with Tomas Scheckter, Tony George, A. J. Foyt IV and Stéphan Grégoire in the Daytona Prototype class. The car started eighteenth and finished 29th overall (seventeenth in class) due to engine problems after 587 laps. Carpenter finished the season ranked 103rd in the final points standings. Carpenter returned to the series in 2008, again for the Rolex 24 at Daytona. He drove the No. 03 Vision Racing Porsche-Crawford with George, Foyt, Vítor Meira and John Andretti in the Daytona Prototype class. The car started twentieth and finished 25th overall (12th in class) with 615 laps completed. Carpenter ranked 68th in the final points standings.

== Media appearances ==
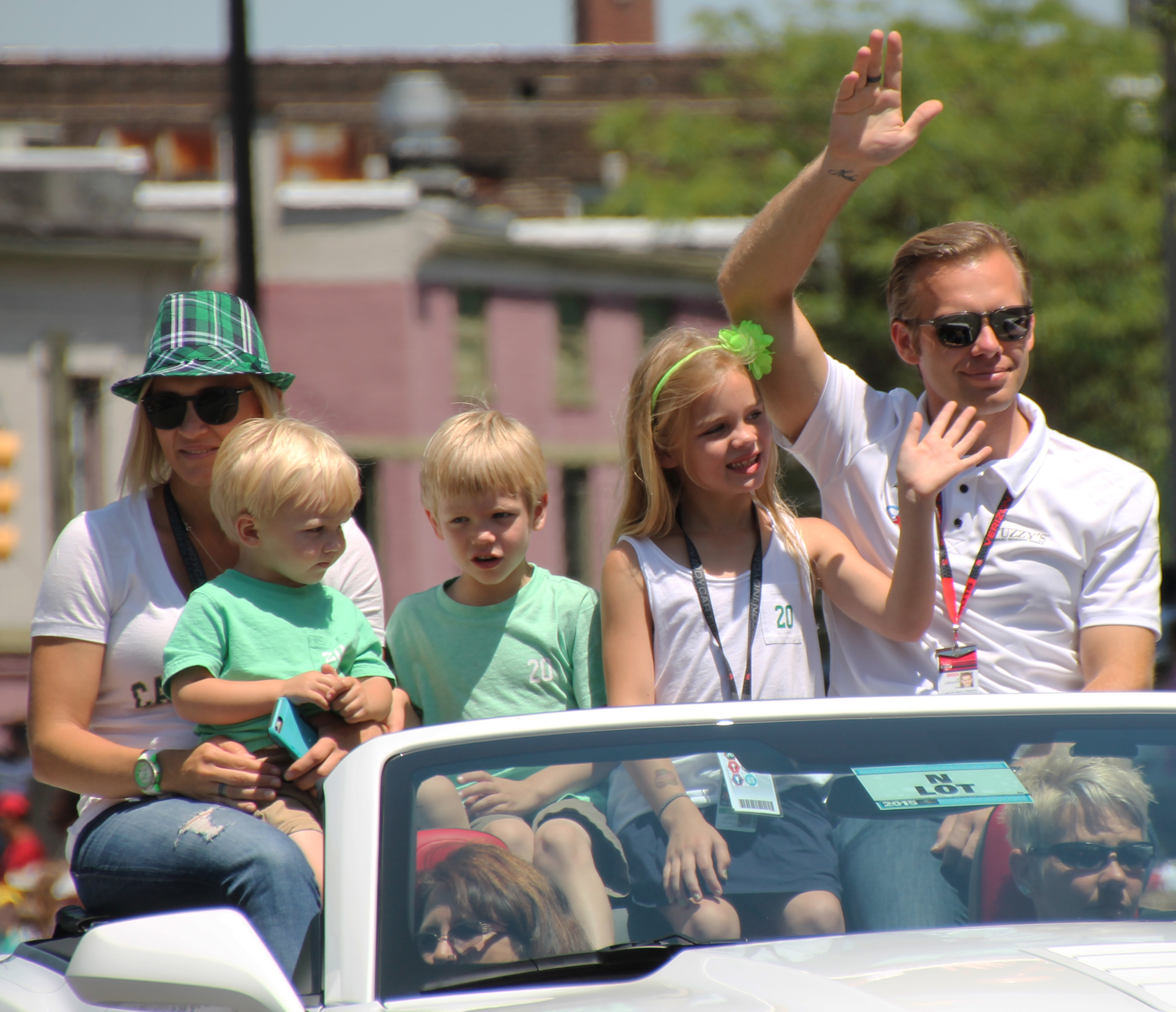
Carpenter with his family at the 2015 Indianapolis 500

=== Film and television ===
Carpenter was the subject of an episode of the television series IndyCar 36. The episode highlights Carpenter's weekend at the Iowa Corn Indy 250 at Iowa Speedway. The episode was broadcast before the Honda Indy Toronto at Exhibition Place on July 8, 2012.

== Racing record ==
=== American open-wheel racing results ===
(key)

==== Indy Lights ====
| Year | Team | Chassis | Engine | 1 | 2 | 3 | 4 | 5 | 6 | 7 | 8 | 9 | 10 | 11 | 12 | 13 | 14 | Rank | Points |
|---|---|---|---|---|---|---|---|---|---|---|---|---|---|---|---|---|---|---|---|
| 2002 | Sinden Racing | Dallara IPS | Infiniti Q45 | KAN; 5 | NSH; 5 | MIS; 3 | KTY; 2 | STL; 3 | CHI; 7 | TXS; 5 | | | | | | | | 3rd | 226 |
| 2003 | A. J. Foyt Enterprises | Dallara IPS | Infiniti Q45 | HMS; 15 | PHX; 13 | INDY; 1 | PPIR; 4 | KAN; 2 | NSH; 13 | MIS; 7 | STL; 4 | KTY; 5 | CHI; 2 | FON; 2 | TXS; 4 | | | 3rd | 377 |
| 2005 | Vision Racing | Dallara IPS | Infiniti Q45 | HMS | PHX | STP | INDY | TXS | IMS; 11 | NSH | MIL | KTY | PPIR | SNM | CHI | WGL | FON | 26th | 19 |

==== IndyCar Series ====
| Year | Team | No. | Chassis | Engine | 1 | 2 | 3 | 4 | 5 | 6 | 7 | 8 | 9 | 10 | 11 | 12 | 13 | 14 | 15 | 16 | 17 | 18 | 19 | Rank | Points | Ref |
|---|---|---|---|---|---|---|---|---|---|---|---|---|---|---|---|---|---|---|---|---|---|---|---|---|---|---|
| 2003 | PDM Racing | 18 | Dallara | Chevrolet | HMS | PHX | MOT | INDY | TXS | PPIR | RIR | KAN | NSH | MIS | STL | KTY | NZR | CHI; 13 | FON; 13 | TX2; 21 | | | | 27th | 43 | |
| 2004 | Red Bull Cheever Racing | 52 | Dallara | Chevrolet | HMS; 12 | PHX; 19 | MOT; 22 | INDY; 31 | TXS; 21 | RIR; 16 | KAN; 14 | NSH; 22 | MIL; 11 | MIS; 14 | KTY; 8 | PPIR; 11 | NZR; 20 | CHI; 11 | FON; 12 | TX2; 21 | | | | 16th | 245 | |
| 2005 | Vision Racing | 20 | Dallara | Toyota | HMS; 18 | PHX; 16 | STP; 19 | MOT; 16 | INDY; 11 | TXS; 20 | RIR; 12 | KAN; 17 | NSH; 10 | MIL; 12 | MIS; 23 | KTY; 22 | PPIR; 19 | SNM; 15 | CHI; 17 | WGL; 14 | FON; 20 | | | 18th | 244 | |
| 2006 | Vision Racing | 20 | Dallara | Honda | HMS; DNS | STP | MOT; 20 | INDY; 11 | WGL; 6 | TXS; 9 | RIR; 8 | KAN; 16 | NSH; 10 | MIL; 16 | MIS; 7 | KTY; 11 | SNM; 12 | CHI; 5 | | | | | | 14th | 252 | |
| 2007 | Vision Racing | 20 | Dallara | Honda | HMS; 6 | STP; 18 | MOT; 15 | KAN; 17 | INDY; 17 | MIL; 7 | TXS; 18 | IOW; 6 | RIR; 10 | WGL; 12 | NSH; 13 | MOH; 16 | MIS; 14 | KTY; 7 | SNM; 13 | DET; 10 | CHI; 16 | | | 15th | 309 | |
| 2008 | Vision Racing | 20 | Dallara | Honda | HMS; 5 | STP; 18 | MOT^{1} 6 | LBH^{1} DNP | KAN; 10 | INDY; 5 | MIL; 20 | TXS; 9 | IOW; 23 | RIR; 11 | WGL; 17 | NSH; 8 | MOH; 15 | EDM; 13 | KTY; 6 | SNM; 23 | DET; 14 | CHI; 28 | | 15th | 320 | |
| 2009 | Vision Racing | 20 | Dallara | Honda | STP; 18 | LBH; 18 | KAN; 9 | INDY; 8 | MIL; 16 | TXS; 9 | IOW; 10 | RIR; 13 | WGL; 16 | TOR; 15 | EDM; 16 | KTY; 2 | MOH; 17 | SNM; 11 | CHI; 6 | MOT; 13 | HMS; 12 | | | 12th | 321 | |
| 2010 | Panther Racing | 20 | Dallara | Honda | SAO | STP | ALA | LBH | KAN | INDY; 17 | TXS | IOW | WGL | TOR | EDM | MOH | SNM | CHI; 20 | KTY; 2 | MOT | HMS; 13 | | | 28th | 90 | |
| 2011 | Sarah Fisher Racing | 67 | Dallara | Honda | STP | ALA | LBH | SAO | INDY; 11 | TXS1; 18 | TXS2; 16 | MIL; 16 | IOW; 11 | TOR | EDM | MOH; 22 | NHM; 11 | SNM; 25 | BAL; 20 | MOT | KTY; 1 | LVS^{2} C | | 26th | 175 | |
| 2012 | Ed Carpenter Racing | 20 | Dallara DW12 | Chevrolet | STP; 18 | ALA; 22 | LBH; 14 | SAO; 21 | INDY; 21 | DET; 12 | TXS; 12 | MIL; 8 | IOW; 8 | TOR; 18 | EDM; 22 | MOH; 22 | SNM; 20 | BAL; 25 | FON; 1 | | | | | 18th | 261 | |
| 2013 | Ed Carpenter Racing | 20 | Dallara DW12 | Chevrolet | STP; 14 | ALA; 22 | LBH; 18 | SAO; 23 | INDY; 10 | DET; 18 | DET; 15 | TXS; 4 | MIL; 14 | IOW; 4 | POC; 9 | TOR; 13 | TOR; 22 | MOH; 20 | SNM; 19 | BAL; 14 | HOU; 23 | HOU; 22 | FON; 2 | 16th | 333 | |
| 2014 | Ed Carpenter Racing | 20 | Dallara DW12 | Chevrolet | STP | LBH | ALA | IMS | INDY; 27 | DET | DET | TXS; 1 | HOU | HOU | POC; 13 | IOW; 5 | TOR | TOR | MOH | MIL; 9 | SNM | FON; 3 | | 22nd | 262 | |
| 2015 | CFH Racing | 20 | Dallara DW12 | Chevrolet | STP | NLA | LBH | ALA | IMS | INDY; 30 | DET | DET | TXS; 22 | TOR | FON; 22 | MIL; 10 | IOW; 6 | MOH | POC; 17 | SNM | | | | 27th | 88 | |
| 2016 | Ed Carpenter Racing | 20 | Dallara DW12 | Chevrolet | STP | PHX; 21 | LBH | ALA | IMS | INDY; 31 | DET | DET | RDA | IOW; 18 | TOR | MOH | POC; 21 | TXS; 18 | WGL | SNM | | | | 25th | 67 | |
| 2017 | Ed Carpenter Racing | 20 | Dallara DW12 | Chevrolet | STP | LBH | ALA | PHX; 7 | IMS | INDY; 11 | DET | DET | TEX; 11 | ROA | IOW; 12 | TOR | MOH | POC; 12 | GTW; 21 | WGL | SNM | | | 22nd | 169 | |
| 2018 | Ed Carpenter Racing | 20 | Dallara DW12 | Chevrolet | STP | PHX; 7 | LBH | ALA | IMS | INDY; 2 | DET | DET | TXS; 20 | ROA | IOW; 10 | TOR | MOH | POC; 10 | GTW; 12 | POR | SNM | | | 20th | 187 | |
| 2019 | Ed Carpenter Racing | 20 | Dallara DW12 | Chevrolet | STP | COA | ALA | LBH | IMS | INDY; 6 | DET | DET | TXS; 13 | RDA | TOR | IOW; 19 | MOH | POC; 6 | GTW; 2 | POR | LAG | | | 23rd | 161 | |
| 2020 | Ed Carpenter Racing | 20 | Dallara DW12 | Chevrolet | TXS; 5 | IMS | ROA | ROA | IOW; 15 | IOW; 23 | INDY; 26 | GTW; 20 | GTW; 21 | MOH | MOH | IMS | IMS | STP | | | | | | 25th | 81 | |
| 2021 | Ed Carpenter Racing | 20 | Dallara DW12 | Chevrolet | ALA | STP | TXS; 17 | TXS; 11 | IMS | INDY; 5 | DET | DET | ROA | MOH | NSH | IMS | GTW; 22 | POR | LAG | LBH | | | | 27th | 107 | |
| 2022 | Ed Carpenter Racing | 33 | Dallara DW12 | Chevrolet | STP | TXS; 13 | LBH | ALA | IMS | INDY; 19 | DET | ROA | MOH | TOR | IOW; 25 | IOW; 17 | IMS | NSH | GTW; 22 | POR | LAG | | | 27th | 75 | |
| 2023 | Ed Carpenter Racing | 33 | Dallara DW12 | Chevrolet | STP | TXS; 13 | LBH | ALA | IMS | INDY; 20 | DET | ROA | MOH | TOR | IOW; 24 | IOW; 23 | NSH | IMS | GTW; 24 | POR | LAG | | | 30th | 46 | |
| 2024 | Ed Carpenter Racing | 20 | Dallara DW12 | Chevrolet | STP | THE | LBH | ALA | IMS | INDY; 17 | DET | ROA | LAG | MOH | IOW; 20 | IOW; 22 | TOR | GTW; 17 | POR | MIL | MIL | NSH | | 32nd | 45 | |
| 2025 | Ed Carpenter Racing | 33 | Dallara DW12 | Chevrolet | STP | THE | LBH | ALA | IMS | INDY; 15 | DET | GTW | ROA | MOH | IOW | IOW | TOR | LAG | POR | MIL | NSH | | | 30th | 16 | |
| 2026 | Ed Carpenter Racing | 33 | Dallara DW12 | Chevrolet | STP | PHX | ARL | ALA | LBH | IMS | INDY; 31 | DET | GTW | ROA | MOH | NSH | POR | MRK | WSH | MIL | MIL | LAG | | 31st | 5 | |

* Season still in progress
^{1} Run on same day.
^{2} Race cancelled due to death of Dan Wheldon

| Years | Teams | Races | Poles | Wins | Top 5s | Top 10s | Indianapolis 500 Wins | Championships |
|---|---|---|---|---|---|---|---|---|
| 23 | 7 | 207 | 4 | 3 | 17 | 53 | 0 | 0 |

==== Indianapolis 500 ====
| Year | Chassis | Engine | Start | Finish | Team |
|---|---|---|---|---|---|
| 2004 | Dallara | Chevrolet | 16 | 31 | Team Cheever |
| 2005 | Dallara | Toyota | 26 | 11 | Vision Racing |
| 2006 | Dallara | Honda | 12 | 11 | Vision Racing |
| 2007 | Dallara | Honda | 14 | 17 | Vision Racing |
| 2008 | Dallara | Honda | 10 | 5 | Vision Racing |
| 2009 | Dallara | Honda | 17 | 8 | Vision Racing |
| 2010 | Dallara | Honda | 8 | 17 | Panther Racing |
| 2011 | Dallara | Honda | 8 | 11 | Sarah Fisher Racing |
| 2012 | Dallara | Chevrolet | 28 | 21 | Ed Carpenter Racing |
| 2013 | Dallara | Chevrolet | 1 | 10 | Ed Carpenter Racing |
| 2014 | Dallara | Chevrolet | 1 | 27 | Ed Carpenter Racing |
| 2015 | Dallara | Chevrolet | 12 | 30 | CFH Racing |
| 2016 | Dallara | Chevrolet | 20 | 31 | Ed Carpenter Racing |
| 2017 | Dallara | Chevrolet | 2 | 11 | Ed Carpenter Racing |
| 2018 | Dallara | Chevrolet | 1 | 2 | Ed Carpenter Racing |
| 2019 | Dallara | Chevrolet | 2 | 6 | Ed Carpenter Racing |
| 2020 | Dallara | Chevrolet | 16 | 26 | Ed Carpenter Racing |
| 2021 | Dallara | Chevrolet | 4 | 5 | Ed Carpenter Racing |
| 2022 | Dallara | Chevrolet | 4 | 18 | Ed Carpenter Racing |
| 2023 | Dallara | Chevrolet | 13 | 20 | Ed Carpenter Racing |
| 2024 | Dallara | Chevrolet | 17 | 17 | Ed Carpenter Racing |
| 2025 | Dallara | Chevrolet | 14 | 15 | Ed Carpenter Racing |
| 2026 | Dallara | Chevrolet | 13 | 31 | Ed Carpenter Racing |
