= Mary Ware (politician) =

American politician

Member of the Kansas Senate from the 25th district
- In office January 13, 2019 – November 13, 2025
- Preceded by: Lynn Rogers
- Succeeded by: Silas Miller

Personal details
- Born: November 3, 1951 (age 74)
- Party: Democratic

Mary Anita Ware (born November 3, 1951) is an American politician, social justice activist, and businesswoman who served as a member of the Kansas Senate for the 25th Senate district in Wichita, Kansas.

== Career ==
She was elected to the Senate in December 2018 by Democratic Party precinct committee members to succeed Democrat Lynn Rogers, who stepped down to become lieutenant governor of Kansas. In 2020, Ware was elected to a full term in her own right, defeating Republican Vail Fruechting by a margin of 55% to 45% in the general election. In 2024, she was reelected, defeating Republican Keenen Smith 57% to 43%. She resigned from the chamber in November 2025. Outside of her work in the Kansas Legislature, Ware owns a CBD store, American Shaman Botanicals, in Wichita.

== Committee assignments ==
Ware, in 2023, is assigned to these Kansas Senate Committees:

- Agriculture and Natural Resources (ranking minority member)
- Joint Committee on Kansas Security
- Legislative Post Audit Committee -
- 2021 Special Committee on Federal 340B Drug Program
- 2022 Special Committee on Water

Preceded by Lynn Rogers	Kansas Senator from the 25th district January 13, 2019 - November 13, 2025	Succeeded by Silas Miller
