= Kansas's 25th Senate district =

American legislative district

Kansas's 25th State Senate district
Senator
Mary Ware; D–Wichita
- Demographics: 61% White; 6% Black; 25% Hispanic; 2% Asian; 1% Native American; 5% Other
- Population (2018): 72,244

Kansas's 25th Senate district is one of 40 districts in the Kansas Senate. It has been represented by Democrat Mary Ware since her 2019 appointment to succeed Lynn Rogers who resigned following his election as Lieutenant Governor.

== Geography ==
District 25 is based entirely in western Wichita, straddling the Arkansas River in central Sedgwick County.

The district is located within Kansas's 4th congressional district, and overlaps with the 86th, 92nd, 95th, 97th, 103rd, and 105th districts of the Kansas House of Representatives. At 20.4 square miles, it is tied with the 8th district for smallest Senate district in the state.

== Recent election results ==
=== 2020 ===
2020 Kansas Senate election, District 25
Primary election
Party	Candidate	Votes	%
Democratic	Mary Ware (incumbent)	12,647	54.7
Republican	Vail Fruechting	10,456	45.3
Total votes		23,103	100
Democratic hold			

=== 2016 ===
2016 Kansas Senate election, District 25
Primary election
Party	Candidate	Votes	%
Republican	Jim Price	1,907	68.2
Republican	William Eveland	890	31.8
Total votes		2,797	100
General election
Democratic	Lynn Rogers	11,704	58.5
Republican	Jim Price	8,308	41.5
Total votes		20,012	100
Democratic gain from Republican			

=== 2012 ===
2012 Kansas Senate election, District 25
Primary election
Party	Candidate	Votes	%
Republican	Michael O'Donnell	2,785	58.8
Republican	Jean Schodorf (incumbent)	1,949	41.2
Total votes		4,734	100
General election
Republican	Michael O'Donnell	9,326	46.6
Democratic	Tim Snow	9,063	45.3
Libertarian	Dave Thomas	1,607	8.0
Total votes		19,996	100
Republican hold			

=== Federal and statewide results ===
Year	Office	Results
2020	President	Biden 51.9 – 45.1%
2018	Governor	Kelly 56.5 – 33.4%
2016	President	Trump 46.7 – 45.1%
2012	President	Romney 48.4 – 48.1%
