= Francesco Dracone =

Italian racing driver

- Nationality: Italian
- Born: 21 September 1983 (age 43) Turin, Italy

IndyCar Series career
- Debut season: 2010
- Current team: Dale Coyne Racing
- Categorisation: FIA Silver
- Car number: 19
- Former teams: Conquest Racing
- Starts: 7
- Wins: 0
- Poles: 0
- Fastest laps: 0
- Best finish: 34th in 2015

Previous series
- 2011–14 2006–09 2002–05: Auto GP; Euroseries 3000; Italian Formula Three

Francesco Dracone (born 21 September 1983) is an Italian racing driver who currently competes in the European Le Mans Series with BHK Motorsport.

== Career ==
Born in Turin, Dracone began racing professionally in the Italian Formula Three Championship in 2002. He raced in that series until 2005. In 2006 he moved to Euroseries 3000 driving for Euronova Racing. He finished 21st in points. He returned in 2007 driving for ASR and 2G Racing finishing 23rd in points. In 2008, he drove for Emmebi Motorsport and improved to seventeenth in points. He returned to the team and series in 2009 and improved further to seventh in points with a best finish of fifth at Monza. He also competed in the International Superstars Series season finale at Kyalami for Ferlito Motors. In July 2010, he participated in an IndyCar Series rookie test with Conquest Racing. After passing the test he signed on to compete with the team at the Mid-Ohio Sports Car Course and Infineon Raceway.

Dracone was slowest among drivers who logged a qualifying time at Mid-Ohio but started 23rd on the 27 car grid due to being in the same group as Milka Duno who elected not to participate in qualifying and Graham Rahal who was penalized. Dracone finished the race three laps down in 22nd place. He started last at Infineon, despite being a second quicker than Duno. The race saw Dracone spin off track close to the finish and he was credited with twentieth place. He finished 37th in the championship.

After four years in Auto GP, Dracone returned to IndyCar in 2015, signing a deal to drive the first four races for Dale Coyne Racing. At NOLA Motorsports Park, he spun on the first lap but rejoined, before hitting his mechanic Todd Phillips after losing control of his car in the pit lane.

== Racing record ==
=== Italian Formula Three Championship results ===
(key) (Races in bold indicate pole position; races in italics indicate fastest lap)

| Year | Entrant | Chassis | Engine | 1 | 2 | 3 | 4 | 5 | 6 | 7 | 8 | 9 | 10 | 11 | 12 | 13 | 14 | Pos | Points |
|---|---|---|---|---|---|---|---|---|---|---|---|---|---|---|---|---|---|---|---|
| 2002 | Dracone | Dallara F302 | Spiess-Opel | VLL | MIS | PER | MNZ | VAR | IMO; 17 | BIN | MUG | MAG | | | | | | 27th | 0 |
| 2004 | Motivi Team | Dallara F302 | Spiess-Opel | ADR; 11 | MAG | PER | MUG | MUG | IMO | IMO | | | | | | | | 18th | 5 |
| 2004 | Corbetta Angelo | Dallara F303 | Mugen-Honda | | | | | | | | VAR; 9 | MNZ; 8 | MNZ; Ret | VLL | VLL | MIS | MIS | 18th | 5 |
| 2005 | Corbetta Competizioni | Dallara F304 | Spiess-Opel | ADR | VLL | IMO; Ret | IMO; Ret | MUG | MUG | VAR | MNZ | MNZ | ADR | MIS | MIS | | | NC | 0 |

=== Complete Euroseries 3000/Auto GP series results ===
(key) (Races in bold indicate pole position; races in italics indicate fastest lap)

| Year | Entrant | 1 | 2 | 3 | 4 | 5 | 6 | 7 | 8 | 9 | 10 | 11 | 12 | 13 | 14 | 15 | 16 | 17 | 18 | Pos | Points |
|---|---|---|---|---|---|---|---|---|---|---|---|---|---|---|---|---|---|---|---|---|---|
| 2006 | Euronova Racing | ADR; 1 Ret | ADR; 2; 9 | IMO; 1 Ret | IMO; 2; 11 | SPA; 1 | SPA; 2 | HUN; 1 | HUN; 2 | MUG; 1 Ret | MUG; 2; 12 | SIL; 1 Ret | SIL; 2; 10 | CAT; 1 DNS | CAT; 2; 8 | VLL; 1; 12 | VLL; 2; 9 | MIS; 1 DNS | MIS; 2 DNS | 23rd | 0 |
| 2007 | Auto Sport Racing | VLL; 1; 9 | VLL; 2; 9 | HUN; 1 | HUN; 2 | | | | | | | | | | | | | | | 22nd | 2 |
| 2007 | 2G Racing | | | | | MAG; 1; 10 | MAG; 2; 9 | MUG; 1; 10 | MUG; 2 Ret | NÜR; 1; 8 | NÜR; 2 Ret | SPA; 1; 12 | SPA; 2; 6 | MNZ; 1 Ret | MNZ; 2; 7 | CAT; 1; 10 | CAT; 2; 7 | | | 22nd | 2 |
| 2008 | Emmebi Motorsport | VLL; 1; 8 | VLL; 2; 7 | SPA; 1; 10 | SPA; 2 C | VAL; 1; 8 | VAL; 2; 8 | MUG; 1 Ret | MUG; 2; 9 | MIS; 1 Ret | MIS; 2 Ret | JER; 1; 7 | JER; 2 Ret | CAT; 1; 8 | CAT; 2; 5 | MAG; 1 | MAG; 2 | | | 18th | 7 |
| 2009 | Emmebi Motorsport | ALG; 1 | ALG; 2 | MAG; 1 Ret | MAG; 2; 8 | DON; 1 C | DON; 2 C | ZOL; 1; 7 | ZOL; 2; 7 | VAL; 1; 7 | VAL; 2; 6 | VAL; 3 Ret | VLL; 1; 7 | VLL; 2; 7 | MNZ; 1; 5 | MNZ; 2; 5 | | | | 7th | 15 |
| 2011 | Emmebi Motorsport | MNZ; 1; 10 | MNZ; 2; 13 | HUN; 1; 12 | HUN; 2; 12 | BRN; 1 Ret | BRN; 2; 14† | | | | | | | | | | | | | 21st | 1 |
| 2011 | Ombra Racing | | | | | | | DON; 1 Ret | DON; 2; 10 | OSC; 1 Ret | OSC; 2; 12† | VAL; 1; 14 | VAL; 2; 13 | MUG; 1; 14† | MUG; 2; 11 | | | | | 21st | 1 |
| 2012 | Virtuosi UK | MNZ; 1 | MNZ; 2 | VAL; 1 | VAL; 2 | MAR; 1; 10 | MAR; 2; 8 | HUN; 1; 10 | HUN; 2; 14 | ALG; 1; 13 | ALG; 2; 10 | CUR; 1; 8 | CUR; 2; 9 | SON; 1 Ret | SON; 2; 9 | | | | | 16th | 14 |
| 2013 | Super Nova International | MNZ; 1 | MNZ; 2 | MAR; 1 | MAR; 2 | HUN; 1; 11 | HUN; 2; 11 | SIL; 1 Ret | SIL; 2; 13 | | | | | | | | | | | 22nd | 0 |
| 2013 | Ibiza Racing Team | | | | | | | | | MUG; 1 Ret | MUG; 2; 13 | NÜR; 1 | NÜR; 2 | DON; 1 | DON; 2 | BRN; 1; 13 | BRN; 2; 14 | | | 22nd | 0 |
| 2014 | Ibiza Racing | MAR; 1; 9† | MAR; 2; 9† | LEC; 1 | LEC; 2 | HUN; 1 | HUN; 2 | | | | | | | | | | | | | 13th | 31 |
| 2014 | Super Nova International | | | | | | | MNZ; 1; 6 | MNZ; 2; 10 | IMO; 1; 6 | IMO; 2; 10 | RBR; 1 | RBR; 2 | NÜR; 1; 8 | NÜR; 2; 10 | EST; 1 Ret | EST; 2; 7 | | | 13th | 31 |

† Driver did not finish the race, but was classified as he completed over 90% of the race distance.

=== American open–wheel results ===
(key)

==== IndyCar Series ====
| Year | Team | No. | Chassis | Engine | 1 | 2 | 3 | 4 | 5 | 6 | 7 | 8 | 9 | 10 | 11 | 12 | 13 | 14 | 15 | 16 | 17 | Rank | Points | Ref |
|---|---|---|---|---|---|---|---|---|---|---|---|---|---|---|---|---|---|---|---|---|---|---|---|---|
| 2010 | Conquest Racing | 34 | Dallara | Honda | SAO | STP | ALA | LBH | KAN | INDY | TXS | IOW | WGL | TOR | EDM | MOH; 22 | | | | | | 37th | 24 | |
| 2010 | Conquest Racing | 36 | Dallara | Honda | | | | | | | | | | | | | SNM; 20 | CHI | KTY | MOT | HMS | 37th | 24 | |
| 2015 | Dale Coyne Racing | 19 | Dallara DW12 | Honda | STP; 23 | NLA; 23 | LBH; 21 | ALA; 23 | IMS; 22 | INDY | DET | DET | TXS | TOR | FON | MIL | IOW | MOH | POC | SNM | | 34th | 38 | |

| Years | Teams | Races | Poles | Wins | Podiums (Non-win) | Top 10s (Non-podium) | Indianapolis 500 Wins | Championships |
|---|---|---|---|---|---|---|---|---|
| 2 | 2 | 7 | 0 | 0 | 0 | 0 | 0 | 0 |

=== Complete European Le Mans Series results ===
(key) (Races in bold indicate pole position; results in italics indicate fastest lap)

| Year | Entrant | Class | Chassis | Engine | 1 | 2 | 3 | 4 | 5 | 6 | Rank | Points |
|---|---|---|---|---|---|---|---|---|---|---|---|---|
| 2018 | BHK Motorsport | LMP3 | Ligier JS P3 | Nissan VK50VE 5.0 L V8 | LEC; 15 | MNZ; 12 | RBR; 15 | SIL; 12 | SPA; Ret | ALG; 11 | 28th | 2.5 |
| 2019 | BHK Motorsport | LMP2 | Oreca 07 | Gibson GK428 4.2 L V8 | LEC; 16 | MNZ; 15 | CAT; 11 | SIL; 10 | SPA; 11 | ALG; 10 | 24th | 4 |
| 2020 | BHK Motorsport | LMP2 | Oreca 07 | Gibson GK428 4.2 L V8 | LEC; Ret | SPA; Ret | LEC; 14 | MNZ; 13 | ALG; 13 | | 26th | 1.5 |
| 2021 | BHK Motorsport | LMP2 | Oreca 07 | Gibson GK428 4.2 L V8 | CAT; 13 | RBR; 15 | LEC; 11 | MNZ; 18 | SPA; 9 | ALG; 9 | 27th | 6 |
| 2022 | BHK Motorsport | LMP2 | Oreca 07 | Gibson GK428 4.2 L V8 | LEC; WD | IMO; 16 | MNZ; 14 | CAT; 15 | SPA; 13 | ALG; 12 | 26th | 0 |
