= 2015 Chevrolet Detroit Belle Isle Grand Prix =

(United States) 2015 Detroit Indy Grand Prix
Race details
7th and 8th round of the 2015 IndyCar Series season
← Previous race	Next race →
- Date: May 30 and 31, 2015
- Official name: Detroit Belle Isle Grand Prix
- Location: The Raceway on Belle Isle; Detroit, United States
- Course: Temporary street circuit 2.350 mi / 3.782 km
- Distance: 70 laps 164.500 mi / 264.737 km
Race 1
- Weather: 73 °F (23 °C), wet, dry, rain, thunderstorms.

Pole position
- Driver: (Australia) Will Power (Team Penske)
- Time: 1:16.0941

Fastest lap
- Driver: (United Kingdom) Jack Hawksworth (A. J. Foyt Enterprises)
- Time: 79.8721 (on lap 30 of 47)

Podium
- First: (Colombia) Carlos Muñoz (Andretti Autosport)
- Second: (United States) Marco Andretti (Andretti Autosport)
- Third: (France) Simon Pagenaud (Team Penske)
Race 2
- Weather: 53 °F (12 °C), wet, rain

Pole position
- Driver: (Colombia) Juan Pablo Montoya (Team Penske)
- Time: Points

Fastest lap
- Driver: (France) Sébastien Bourdais (KVSH Racing)
- Time: 1:17.9133 (on lap 68 of 68)

Podium
- First: (France) Sébastien Bourdais (KVSH Racing)
- Second: (Japan) Takuma Sato (A. J. Foyt Enterprises)
- Third: (United States) Graham Rahal (Rahal Letterman Lanigan Racing)

The 2015 Chevrolet Dual in Detroit was the first and only doubleheader of the 2015 IndyCar Series season, hosting Rounds 7 and 8 of the 2015 IndyCar Series season. It marked the eighth Detroit Belle Isle Grand Prix since the Verizon IndyCar Series made its debut at the Belle Isle racetrack in 2007 and the third time it held a "dual" two-race IndyCar contest over two days.

Initial practice and then qualifications were held on Friday May 29, 2015. The pole position for the first race was won by Will Power for Team Penske. Race day practice occurred in the morning on Saturday May 30 and Race 1 took place in the afternoon with Carlos Muñoz winning Race 1 of the dual after it was called after lap 47 of a scheduled 70 laps due to rain and electrical storms. His Andretti Autosport teammate Marco Andretti took second, and third place went to Simon Pagenaud of Team Penske.

Qualifying for Race 2 was only partially completed on Sunday May 31 when it was canceled due to heavy rains causing too much standing water on the track. As a result, starting positions were determined by overall point standings. The rain tapered off later in the after race took place later in the day as scheduled. Sébastien Bourdais of KV Racing Technology won a timed-Race 2 which went 68 laps out of a scheduled 70. Takuma Sato racing for A. J. Foyt Enterprises and Graham Rahal of Rahal Letterman Lanigan Racing taking the third podium spot.

== Background ==
In the 2014 doubleheader, Team Penske swept the two races with Will Power winning Race 1 and Hélio Castroneves winning Race 2. This year Juan Pablo Montoya seeks to build on his Indy 500 win the previous week. Montoya leads the IndyCar series points standings heading into the Belle Isle Grand Prix and will have two chances to stretch his lead. If Montoya's teammate on Will Power, the 2014 IndyCar Series season champion, starts in the second race of the doubleheader on May 31 it would will mark his 100th start with Team Penske and his 145 IndyCar start since 2005. Power came in a very close second at the Indy 500, and is second in the overall standings. He hopes to overtake Montoya in the points race.

The only drivers in the top five coming into the dual races is not on Team Penske is Scott Dixon of Ganassi Racing who is 20 points back from Power and Graham Rahal of Rahal Letterman Lanigan Racing who is two points behind Castroneves for Penske drivers which holds three of the top four point total positions so far in the series. Graham stated that “I feel really good about Detroit." and with his second-place finish in Dual 1 in the previous year's Belle Isle Grand Prix hopes that "we’ll be there in the hunt". The next closet driver in the overall standings is Josef Newgarden from the CFH Racing team and he is 31 points back from Rahal.

The top product development executive at General Motors, Mark Reuss, will be the honorary pace car driver of the Chevrolet Corvette Z06 for both races, with two-time Indianapolis 500 winner Arie Luyendyk being the pace car driver during the races.

=== Pre-race changes ===
Prior to practice and qualifications which took place on Friday May 29, Dale Coyne Racing announced that Tristan Vautier, who drove their No. 18 Honda in the Indy 500 on May 24, would drive their No. 19 entry in the Detroit Belle Isle Grand Prix doubleheader. When he raced for Schmidt Peterson Motorsports in 2013, Vautier finished 11th and 14th at the Belle Isle Grand Prix. In addition Dale Coyne Racing announced that Rodolfo González, who made his IndyCar Series debut for the team in April at the Indy Grand Prix of Alabama, and would be driving their No. 18 Honda at Belle Isle.

Schmidt Peterson Motorsports announced on May 26 that Conor Daly would drive the team's No. 5 Honda in the race as a substitute for James Hinchcliffe who was still recovering from injuries he received in a crash on May 18 before the Indianapolis 500. Daly qualified 22nd in the team's No. 43 entry for that race and prior to moving up the IndyCar series drove for the team in Indy Lights in 2011.

As part of ongoing track improvements first began in 2007, new pavement throughout the course has been laid down. In addition the backstretch between the 6 and 7 turns of the 14-turn course has been moved to the left of the existing street to remove a slight "kink" making the straightaway more straight.

Alterations to both the Chevrolet and Honda road/street course aerodynamic platforms have been implemented by corresponding teams to remove the outer vertical wall of the front wing assembly end fence, attached flaps and strakes of the cars. The teams have installed a patch where the vertical wall had been attached to the front wing assembly. According to IndyCar, these mandated changes would only require minimal balance change by the teams but will increase downforce, creating a potential performance increase on the 2.35-mile, 14-turn street circuit.

== Race 1 – Saturday May 30 ==
=== Qualifying ===
23 cars entered for qualifications for the Grand Prix. During the practice session prior to qualifications for Race 1, Chevy again dominated the field posting the top 9 cars with the best lap performances with Takuma Sato being the only Honda car in the top 10. Three rounds of knockout qualifying for Race 1 took place on Friday May 30, including the "Firestone Fast Six" which determined the Verizon P1 Award for the pole position which was won by Will Power for Team Penske. Power also set a new qualifying lap track record while earning the number one starting position.

Pos	No.	Name	Grp.	Round 1	Round 2	Round 3
1	1	(Australia) Will Power W	1	1:17.2483	1:16.8325	1:16.0941
2	3	(Brazil) Hélio Castroneves W	1	1:17.2501	1:16.7015	1:16.1200
3	2	(Colombia) Juan Pablo Montoya	2	1:17.7726	1:16.6895	1:16.4428
4	14	(Japan) Takuma Sato	1	1:17.5692	1:16.8779	1:16.5363
5	22	(France) Simon Pagenaud W	2	1:17.6219	1:16.9353	1:16.6656
6	11	(France) Sébastien Bourdais	1	1:17.6900	1:16.8317	1:17.0406
7	9	(New Zealand) Scott Dixon W	2	1:18.1728	1:16.9768	
8	4	(Monaco) Stefano Coletti R	2	1:18.6673	1:17.3638	
9	27	(United States) Marco Andretti	1	1:18.0296	1:17.3785	
10	7	(United Kingdom) James Jakes	2	1:18.6768	1:17.5158	
11	19	(France) Tristan Vautier	1	1:18.1866	1:17.8140	
12	8	(United States) Sage Karam R	2	1:17.8152	1:17.9046	
13	15	(United States) Graham Rahal	1	1:18.2239		
14	10	(Brazil) Tony Kanaan W	1	1:18.3144		
15	83	(United States) Charlie Kimball	1	1:18.3303		
16	20	(Italy) Luca Filippi	1	1:18.4404		
17	5	(United States) Conor Daly	1	1:18.4937		
18	41	(United Kingdom) Jack Hawksworth	2	1:18.7504		
19	98	(Colombia) Gabby Chaves R	1	1:19.2306		
20	28	(United States) Ryan Hunter-Reay	2	1:19.3634		
21	67	(United States) Josef Newgarden	2	1:21.4632		
22	26	(Colombia) Carlos Muñoz	2	1:21.4796		
23	18	(Venezuela) Rodolfo González R	2	1:21.8208		
Qualifications

=== Race summary ===
Inclement weather dogged the race from the beginning, with a multi-car incident going into lap 2 when Stefano Coletti initiated a contact causing a 4 car cascade, knocking Graham Rahal out of the race. All of the other drivers managed to return to racing, though Tony Kanaan lost multiple laps while his car was repaired and his tail wing assembly replaced following the incident. Charlie Kimball lost control coming out of turn 2 in lap 14 due to slippage on the wet course and made contact with the outer wall removing him from the competition.

Timing of changes in tire selection between wet condition tires and "slicks" (dry condition tires) proved to be pivotal in the outcome of the race. Both Carlos Muñoz and Marco Andretti of Andretti Autosport delayed switching from the slicks to the wet tires for nearly 10 laps while most other teams pitted to make changes from dry to wet tire set-ups. This allowed both drivers to open a substantial lead before they pitted to make the change, just as the safety car was called on Lap 47 for lightning strikes within the 15 km radius, as required by ACCUS protocol following a 2012 fatality at the NASCAR second Pocono round. Muñoz was comfortably in the lead at the time. Andretti coming in second, and third place going to Simon Pagenaud of Team Penske. With lightning strikes continuing past the 30-minute clock, the race was declared official and completed. This was Muñoz's first career victory in an IndyCar race.

=== Race results ===
Pos	No.	Driver	Team	Engine & Aero Kit	Laps	Time/Retired	Pit Stops	Grid	Laps Led	Pts.^{1}
1	26	(Colombia) Carlos Muñoz	Andretti Autosport	Honda	47	1:30:59.4501	3	22	9	51
2	27	(United States) Marco Andretti	Andretti Autosport	Honda	47	+14.8831	2	9	23	43
3	22	(France) Simon Pagenaud W2	Team Penske	Chevrolet	47	+18.6963	2	5		35
4	1	(Australia) Will Power W1	Team Penske	Chevrolet	47	+29.9813	2	1	4	34
5	9	(New Zealand) Scott Dixon W	Chip Ganassi Racing	Chevrolet	47	+32.8336	2	7		30
6	3	(Brazil) Hélio Castroneves W W2	Team Penske	Chevrolet	47	+36.4851	2	2		28
7	41	(United Kingdom) Jack Hawksworth	A. J. Foyt Enterprises	Honda	47	+38.8878	2	14		26
8	67	(United States) Josef Newgarden	CFH Racing	Chevrolet	47	+42.3010	6	18		24
9	20	(Italy) Luca Filippi	CFH Racing	Chevrolet	47	+50.3522	3	19		22
10	2	(Colombia) Juan Pablo Montoya	Team Penske	Chevrolet	46	+1 Lap	3	3		20
11	14	(Japan) Takuma Sato	A. J. Foyt Enterprises	Honda	46	+1 Lap	4	4	12	20
12	7	(United Kingdom) James Jakes	Schmidt Peterson Motorsports	Honda	46	+1 Lap	5	10		18
13	28	(United States) Ryan Hunter-Reay	Andretti Autosport	Honda	46	+1 Lap	4	16		17
14	11	(France) Sébastien Bourdais	KV Racing Technology	Chevrolet	46	+1 Lap	4	6		16
15	4	(Monaco) Stefano Coletti R	KV Racing Technology	Chevrolet	46	+1 Lap	4	8		15
16	8	(United States) Sage Karam R	Chip Ganassi Racing	Chevrolet	46	+1 Lap	6	12		14
17	19	(France) Tristan Vautier	Dale Coyne Racing	Honda	46	+1 Lap	4	11		13
18	98	(Colombia) Gabby Chaves R	Bryan Herta Autosport	Honda	46	+1 Lap	8	23		12
19	5	(United States) Conor Daly	Schmidt Peterson Motorsports	Honda	46	+1 Lap	5	21		11
20	10	(Brazil) Tony Kanaan W	Chip Ganassi Racing	Chevrolet	33	+14 Laps	6	15		10
21	18	(Venezuela) Rodolfo González R	Dale Coyne Racing	Honda	25	Rear hub	3	22		9
22	83	(United States) Charlie Kimball	Chip Ganassi Racing	Chevrolet	13	Crash T2	2	17		8
23	15	(United States) Graham Rahal	Rahal Letterman Lanigan Racing	Honda	5	Crash T1	0	5		7
OFFICIAL BOX SCORE

Key	Meaning
R	Rookie
W	Past winner
W1	Past winner of race 1 in doubleheader
W2	Past winner of race 2 in doubleheader

=== Notes ===
Race scheduled for 70 laps but shortened due to lightning in the area.

== Race 2 – Sunday May 31 ==
=== Qualifying ===
For Race 2, all cars participated in one of two groups which were scheduled for 20 minutes each on Sunday morning. The pole positions was to be awarded to the best overall lap time in the qualifying sessions with the remainder of the cars in the same group as the pole winner ranked in the odd-numbered race starting positions based on fastest lap times. Then even-numbered starting positions would be determined from the other group based on fastest lap times.

While group one managed to complete its qualifying round, group two was unable to complete any qualifying laps. This was due to heavy rains creating too much standing water on the track and bringing out a red flag less than 4 mins into. As a result, the starting order was then set according to overall point standing. This erased rookie Sage Karam's best qualifying time which had him poised to be either in the pole position or starting second. Karam's qualifying time would have marked the highest start position for any rookie in the 2014 to date.

Pos	No.	Name	Grp.	Time
1	2	(Colombia) Juan Pablo Montoya	1	1:37.2255
2	1	(Australia) Will Power W1	2	Canceled
3	3	(Brazil) Hélio Castroneves W W2	2	Canceled
4	9	(New Zealand) Scott Dixon W	1	1:37.1207
5	15	(United States) Graham Rahal	2	Canceled
6	67	(United States) Josef Newgarden	1	1:37.9096
7	27	(United States) Marco Andretti	2	Canceled
8	22	(France) Simon Pagenaud W2	1	1:36.9251
9	11	(France) Sébastien Bourdais	2	Canceled
10	5	(United States) Conor Daly	2	Canceled
11	26	(Colombia) Carlos Muñoz W1	1	1:37.1334
12	83	(United States) Charlie Kimball	2	Canceled
13	10	(Brazil) Tony Kanaan W	2	Canceled
14	28	(United States) Ryan Hunter-Reay	1	1:37.3049
15	14	(Japan) Takuma Sato	2	Canceled
16	7	(United Kingdom) James Jakes	1	1:38.9530
17	20	(Italy) Luca Filippi	2	Canceled
18	98	(Colombia) Gabby Chaves R	2	Canceled
19	41	(United Kingdom) Jack Hawksworth	1	1:37.7028
20	8	(United States) Sage Karam R	1	1:36.4520
21	4	(Monaco) Stefano Coletti R	1	1:37.9096
22	18	(Venezuela) Rodolfo González R	1	1:40.5241
23	19	(France) Tristan Vautier	2	Canceled
Qualifications

=== Race summary ===
Rain had subsided quite a bit by the time of the start of race 2, though the track remained cool and wet which led IndyCar to mandate that all drivers begin the race on their teams "wet" tires. Shortly into the race Carlos Muñoz who had won race 1 the previous day, was forced from the race with mechanical problems in lap 5. After a brief stint of rain the weather cleared and the course began drying out as racing continued. Rookie driver Rodolfo González lost control on wet pavement going into Turn 4 on lap 35, hitting the outer wall and bringing out the first all course yellow flag of the race.

Racing resumed on lap 40 but two laps later another full course yellow came out as Luca Filippi and Stefano Coletti both lost control, making contact with tire barriers, in separate incidents in Turn 2 and Turn 3 respectively. Both cars were able to return to racing which resumed again on lap 44.

Coming out of the pits after switching to “dry” tires, Josef Newgarden lost control when he hit a remaining wet patch on the course and slammed into the outer wall coming out of Turn 2 and bringing out the yellow flag on lap 50. Rookie Conor Daly who had been leading the race from laps 39 to 50 was finally forced to pit during the yellow, cycling the lead to Sébastien Bourdais. Racing resumed 3 laps later until a multi-car crash in lap 55 once again involving Coletti as well as Sage Karam and Jack Hawksworth occurred in Turn 3. All three cars were able to return to racing however.

Contact between Charlie Kimball and Scott Dixon forced Dixon off the track and out of the race in lap 59 bringing out a full-course caution. Racing resumed the following lap but the yellow flag came out once again 2 laps later. Fuel strategy became an issue, with questions about whether the three lead cars had enough to complete the full 70 laps without needing to pit. If the field remained under yellow long enough it might have lowered fuel burn rates to allow the leaders to conserve enough fuel to complete a full race. However an incident between Will Power and teammate Hélio Castroneves in lap 64, when Castroneves clipped Power from behind, brought out a red flag while the track crew scrambled to clear the course of debris and get the race restarted before a timed-end of the race.

After a restart with just over 4 minutes and 30 seconds remaining before a timed race call would end the race, which occurred on lap 68, Sébastien Bourdais of KV Racing Technology managed to hold onto the lead to take the win, followed by Takuma Sato racing for A. J. Foyt Enterprises and Graham Rahal of Rahal Letterman Lanigan Racing taking the third podium spot.

=== Race results ===
Pos	No.	Driver	Team	Engine & Aero Kit	Laps	Time/Retired	Pit Stops	Grid	Laps Led	Pts.^{1}
1	11	(France) Sébastien Bourdais	KV Racing Technology	Chevrolet	68	2:00:38.4300	3	9	18	51
2	14	(Japan) Takuma Sato	A. J. Foyt Enterprises	Honda	68	+1.7644	3	15		40
3	15	(United States) Graham Rahal	Rahal Letterman Lanigan Racing	Honda	68	+2.3388	3	5		35
4	19	(France) Tristan Vautier	Dale Coyne Racing	Honda	68	+9.7413	3	23		32
5	27	(United States) Marco Andretti	Andretti Autosport	Honda	68	+9.9849	6	7		30
6	5	(United States) Conor Daly R	Schmidt Peterson Motorsports	Honda	68	+10.5636	3	10	12	29
7	41	(United Kingdom) Jack Hawksworth	A. J. Foyt Enterprises	Honda	68	+11.3614	5	19		26
8	28	(United States) Ryan Hunter-Reay	Andretti Autosport	Honda	68	+12.0563	3	14		24
9	98	(Colombia) Gabby Chaves R	Bryan Herta Autosport	Honda	68	+13.9912	4	18		22
10	2	(Colombia) Juan Pablo Montoya	Team Penske	Chevrolet	68	+14.0298	3	1	35	23
11	83	(United States) Charlie Kimball	Chip Ganassi Racing	Chevrolet	68	+14.2823	7	12		19
12	8	(United States) Sage Karam R	Chip Ganassi Racing	Chevrolet	68	+25.2484	6	20		18
13	10	(Brazil) Tony Kanaan W	Chip Ganassi Racing	Chevrolet	68	+26.5303	4	13		17
14	22	(France) Simon Pagenaud W2	Team Penske	Chevrolet	68	+27.1177	4	8		16
15	7	(United Kingdom) James Jakes	Schmidt Peterson Motorsports	Honda	67	+1 Lap	5	16		15
16	4	(Monaco) Stefano Coletti R	KV Racing Technology	Chevrolet	67	+1 Lap	6	21		14
17	20	(Italy) Luca Filippi	CFH Racing	Chevrolet	66	+2 Laps	7	19		13
18	1	(Australia) Will Power W1	Team Penske	Chevrolet	64	Crash T2	3	2	2	13
19	3	(Brazil) Hélio Castroneves W W2	Team Penske	Chevrolet	64	Crash T2	3	3		11
20	9	(New Zealand) Scott Dixon W	Chip Ganassi Racing	Chevrolet	58	Crash T4	3	4	1	11
21	67	(United States) Josef Newgarden	CFH Racing	Chevrolet	49	Crash T2	3	6		9
22	18	(Venezuela) Rodolfo González R	Dale Coyne Racing	Honda	35	Crash T4	1	22		8
23	26	(Colombia) Carlos Muñoz W1	Andretti Autosport	Honda	5	Crash damage	0	11		7
OFFICIAL BOX SCORE

Key	Meaning
R	Rookie
W	Past winner
W1	Past winner of race 1 in doubleheader
W2	Past winner of race 2 in doubleheader

=== Notes ===
Race scheduled for 70 laps but shortened due to time limit.

== Championship standings ==
Drivers' standings after race 1

Pos	Driver	Points
1	(Colombia) Juan Pablo Montoya	292
2	(Australia) Will Power	281
3	(New Zealand) Scott Dixon	241
4	(Brazil) Hélio Castroneves	239
5	(United States) Graham Rahal	211

Drivers' standings after race 2

Pos	Driver	Points
1	(Colombia) Juan Pablo Montoya	315
2	(Australia) Will Power	294
3	(New Zealand) Scott Dixon	252
4	(Brazil) Hélio Castroneves	250
5	(United States) Graham Rahal	246

Manufacturer standings

Pos	Manufacturer	Points
1	(United States) Chevrolet	588
2	(Japan) Honda	553

- Note: Only the top five positions are included.

Previous race: 2015 Indianapolis 500	IndyCar Series; 2015 season	Next race: 2015 Firestone 600
Previous race: 2014 Chevrolet Detroit Belle Isle Grand Prix	Detroit Belle Isle Grand Prix	Next race: 2016 Chevrolet Detroit Belle Isle Grand Prix
