= 2015 Grand Prix of Indianapolis =

(United States) 2015 GP Indianapolis
Race details
5th round of the 2015 IndyCar Series season
← Previous race	Next race →
- Date: May 9, 2015
- Official name: Angie's List Grand Prix of Indianapolis
- Location: Indianapolis Motor Speedway; Speedway, Indiana
- Course: Combined road course 2.439 mi / 3.925 km
- Distance: 82 laps 200 mi / 321.87 km

Pole position
- Driver: (Australia) Will Power (Team Penske)
- Time: 1:09.4886

Fastest lap
- Driver: (Canada) James Hinchcliffe (Schmidt Peterson Motorsports)
- Time: 1:10.8604 (on lap 68 of 82)

Podium
- First: (Australia) Will Power (Team Penske)
- Second: (United States) Graham Rahal (Rahal Letterman Lanigan Racing)
- Third: (Colombia) Juan Pablo Montoya (Team Penske)

The 2015 Angie's List Grand Prix of Indianapolis, the second running of the event, was an IndyCar Series held on May 9, 2015, at the Indianapolis Motor Speedway. The fifth round of the 2015 IndyCar Series, it was won by Will Power of Team Penske. Graham Rahal took second for Rahal Letterman Lanigan Racing as he did in the previous round and Juan Pablo Montoya (Team Penske) came in third. The top finishing rookie in the race was Stefano Coletti who finished tenth, the highest finish for a rookie up to that point in the 2015 season, snapping Gabby Chaves' streak of being the top rookie finisher in all the previous rounds.

== Report ==
The logo of 2015 Grand Prix of Indianapolis

Key	Meaning
R	Rookie
W	Past winner

=== Qualifying ===
Pos	No.	Name	Grp.	Round 1	Round 2	Firestone Fast 6
1	1	(Australia) Will Power	1	1:10.0394	1:09.6443	1:09.4886
2	9	(New Zealand) Scott Dixon	2	1:09.7798	1:09.9966	1:09.7156
3	3	(Brazil) Hélio Castroneves	2	1:09.8917	1:09.8773	1:09.7388
4	2	(Colombia) Juan Pablo Montoya	1	1:10.2695	1:09.9151	1:09.8072
5	22	(France) Simon Pagenaud W	2	1:10.0145	1:09.7769	1:09.8715
6	10	(Brazil) Tony Kanaan	2	1:10.2264	1:09.9038	1:10.2772
7	11	(France) Sébastien Bourdais	2	1:10.2779	1:10.0230	
8	17	(Colombia) Sebastián Saavedra	1	1:10.5573	1:10.1572	
9	20	(Italy) Luca Filippi	1	1:10.3168	1:10.1969	
10	4	(Monaco) Stefano Coletti R	1	1:10.3840	1:10.3679	
11	41	(United Kingdom) Jack Hawksworth	2	1:10.3971	1:10.4558	
12	21	(United States) Josef Newgarden	2	1:10.4283	1:10.8321	
13	5	(Canada) James Hinchcliffe	1	1:10.6273		
14	83	(United States) Charlie Kimball	2	1:10.5031		
15	6	(United States) J. R. Hildebrand	1	1:10.6380		
16	98	(Colombia) Gabby Chaves R	2	1:10.5282		
17	15	(United States) Graham Rahal	1	1:10.6480		
18	25	(United Kingdom) Justin Wilson	2	1:10.5776		
19	28	(United States) Ryan Hunter-Reay	1	1:10.8345		
20	7	(United Kingdom) James Jakes	2	1:10.6749		
21	26	(Colombia) Carlos Muñoz	1	1:10.8786		
22	14	(Japan) Takuma Sato	2	1:10.7391		
23	18	(Colombia) Carlos Huertas	1	1:12.5038		
24	27	(United States) Marco Andretti	2	1:11.1636		
25	19	(Italy) Francesco Dracone R	2	1:12.5814		
Qualifications

=== Race results ===
Pos	No.	Driver	Team	Engine & Aero Kit	Laps	Status	Pit Stops	Grid	Laps Led	Pts.^{1}
1	1	(Australia) Will Power	Team Penske	Chevrolet	82	1:42:42.0940	3	1	65	54
2	15	(United States) Graham Rahal	Rahal Letterman Lanigan Racing	Honda	82	+1.5023	3	17	9	41
3	2	(Colombia) Juan Pablo Montoya	Team Penske	Chevrolet	82	+7.1967	3	4		35
4	11	(France) Sébastien Bourdais	KV Racing Technology	Chevrolet	82	+7.7336	3	7		32
5	83	(United States) Charlie Kimball	Chip Ganassi Racing	Chevrolet	82	+25.1179	4	14	1	31
6	3	(Brazil) Hélio Castroneves	Team Penske	Chevrolet	82	+31.7352	4	3		25
7	10	(Brazil) Tony Kanaan	Chip Ganassi Racing	Chevrolet	82	+32.3191	3	6		26
8	4	(Monaco) Stefano Coletti R	KV Racing Technology	Chevrolet	82	+35.3853	3	10		24
9	14	(Japan) Takuma Sato	A. J. Foyt Enterprises	Honda	82	+40.8267	3	22		22
10	9	(New Zealand) Scott Dixon	Chip Ganassi Racing	Chevrolet	82	+47.4715	4	2	1	21
11	28	(United States) Ryan Hunter-Reay	Andretti Autosport	Honda	82	+48.5410	3	19		19
12	5	(Canada) James Hinchcliffe	Schmidt Peterson Motorsports	Honda	82	+49.5461	4	13	4	19
13	26	(Colombia) Carlos Muñoz	Andretti Autosport	Honda	82	+54.2372	3	21		17
14	20	(Italy) Luca Filippi	CFH Racing	Chevrolet	82	+54.8713	3	9		16
15	98	(Colombia) Gabby Chaves R	Bryan Herta Autosport	Honda	82	+1:01.3092	3	16		15
16	27	(United States) Marco Andretti	Andretti Autosport	Honda	82	+1:07.2448	3	24		14
17	17	(Colombia) Sebastián Saavedra	Chip Ganassi Racing	Chevrolet	82	+1:09.2079	4	8		13
18	7	(United Kingdom) James Jakes	Schmidt Peterson Motorsports	Honda	81	+1 Lap	4	20	2	13
19	18	(Colombia) Carlos Huertas	Dale Coyne Racing	Honda	81	+1 Lap	4	23		11
20	21	(United States) Josef Newgarden	CFH Racing	Chevrolet	81	+1 Lap	4	12		10
21	6	(United States) J. R. Hildebrand	CFH Racing	Chevrolet	81	+1 Lap	4	15		9
22	19	(Italy) Francesco Dracone R	Dale Coyne Racing	Honda	80	+2 Laps	3	25		8
23	41	(United Kingdom) Jack Hawksworth	A. J. Foyt Enterprises	Honda	69	+13 Laps	6	11		7
24	25	(United Kingdom) Justin Wilson	Andretti Autosport	Honda	68	Gearbox	2	18		6
25	22	(France) Simon Pagenaud W	Team Penske	Chevrolet	57	Gearbox	2	5		5
OFFICIAL BOX SCORE

=== Notes ===
All cars ran Dallara chassis with aerokits supplied by their respective engine manufacturer.

This was James Hinchcliffe's final race of the season. On May 18 during the post qualifying practice for the 2015 Indianapolis 500 he would suffer life-threatening injuries and miss the remainder of the season.

== Championship standings after the race ==
Drivers' Championship standings

	Pos	Driver	Points
	1	(Colombia) Juan Pablo Montoya	171
3	2	(Australia) Will Power	166
1	3	(Brazil) Hélio Castroneves	158
1	4	(New Zealand) Scott Dixon	144
3	4	(United States) Graham Rahal	144

- Note: Only the top five positions are included.

Previous race: 2015 Honda Indy Grand Prix of Alabama	IndyCar Series; 2015 season	Next race: 2015 Indianapolis 500
Previous race: 2014 Grand Prix of Indianapolis	Grand Prix of Indianapolis	Next race: 2016 Grand Prix of Indianapolis
