= CFH Racing =

Racing team

(United States) CFH Racing
- Founded: August 23, 2014; 12 years ago
- Founder(s): Ed Carpenter; Sarah Fisher; Andrew O'Gara; Willis E. Hartman
- Folded: January 28, 2016; 10 years ago
- Base: Indianapolis, Indiana, USA
- Team principal(s): Ed Carpenter; Sarah Fisher; Andrew O'Gara; Willis E. Hartman
- Former series: IndyCar Series
- Noted drivers: (United States) J. R. Hildebrand (United States) Ed Carpenter (Italy) Luca Filippi (United States) Josef Newgarden
- Teams' Championships: 0
- Drivers' Championships: 0
- Website: http://www.cfhracing.com/

CFH Racing was an American auto racing team that competed in the IndyCar Series The team was founded in August 2014 via a merger between Sarah Fisher Hartman Racing and Ed Carpenter Racing, and debuted in 2015. CFH Racing was co-owned by Ed Carpenter, the only owner/driver in the IndyCar Series, Sarah Fisher, nine-time Indianapolis 500 starter and the first woman to win a pole position for a major open-wheel event, and Kansas businessman Wink Hartman. Based in Speedway, Indiana, the team fielded the No. 20 for Carpenter on ovals and for Luca Filippi on road courses. They also fielded the No. 67 for Josef Newgarden and the No. 6 for J. R. Hildebrand.

== History ==
On August 16, 2014, NBCSN journalist Robin Miller reported that Ed Carpenter would merge his team with Sarah Fisher Hartman Racing, whom he had raced for in 2011; the two teams officially announced the merger at the Milwaukee Mile a week later. The next day, SFHR driver Josef Newgarden was re-signed to a one-year extension to race with CFH. On August 27, the team announced they would run with Chevrolet engines, and a month later, Carpenter confirmed Fuzzy's Award Winning Vodka would follow the team to sponsor the 20. The team made its debut with Carpenter driving in testing for the Firestone Tire and Rubber Company at Indianapolis Motor Speedway from September 23–24, followed by a session at Mid-Ohio Sports Car Course with Newgarden and Mike Conway.

On January 30, 2015, Luca Filippi was hired by the team to contest the road and street circuits. On February 23, Newgarden acquired sponsorship from Century 21 Real Estate for the Indianapolis 500, and his number was changed from No. 67 to No. 21 for the race. On April 7, J. R. Hildebrand was hired to race in the two Indianapolis races with the No. 6 car.

On January 28, 2016, dropping oil prices forced Hartman to withdraw from IndyCar. Afterwards, Fisher withdrew as well, and the team was rebranded back to Ed Carpenter Racing after just one season.

== Racing results ==
=== Complete IndyCar Series results ===
(key)

Year	Chassis	Engine	Drivers	No.	1	2	3	4	5	6	7	8	9	10	11	12	13	14	15	16	Pts Pos	Pos
2015					STP	NOL	LBH	ALA	IMS	INDY	DET		TXS	TOR	FON	MIL	IOW	MOH	POC	SNM		
2015	Dallara DW12	Chevrolet IndyCar V6t	(United States) J. R. Hildebrand	6					21	8											31st	57
2015	Dallara DW12	Chevrolet IndyCar V6t	(Italy) Luca Filippi	20	9	10	22	11	14		9	17		2				21		24	21st	182
2015	Dallara DW12	Chevrolet IndyCar V6t	(United States) Ed Carpenter	20						30			22		22	10	6		17		27th	88
2015	Dallara DW12	Chevrolet IndyCar V6t	(United States) Josef Newgarden	21					20	9											7th	431
2015	Dallara DW12	Chevrolet IndyCar V6t	(United States) Josef Newgarden	67	12	9	7	1			8	21	21	1	21	5	2*	13	2*	21	7th	431

== IndyCar wins ==
#	Season	Date	Sanction	Track / Race	No.	Winning driver	Chassis	Engine	Tire	Grid	Laps Led
1	2015	April 26	IndyCar	Barber Motorsports Park (R)	67	(United States) Josef Newgarden	Dallara DW12	Chevrolet IndyCar V6t	Firestone	5	46
2	2015	June 14	IndyCar	Exhibition Place (S)	67	(United States) Josef Newgarden (2)	Dallara DW12	Chevrolet IndyCar V6t	Firestone	11	30
