= 2015 Toyota Grand Prix of Long Beach =

(United States) 2015 Long Beach
Race details
3rd round of the 2015 IndyCar Series season
← Previous race	Next race →
- Date: April 19, 2015
- Official name: Toyota Grand Prix of Long Beach
- Location: Streets of Long Beach; Long Beach, California
- Course: Temporary street circuit 1.968 mi / 3.167 km
- Distance: 80 laps 157.44 mi / 253.375 km

Pole position
- Driver: (Brazil) Hélio Castroneves (Team Penske)
- Time: 1:06.6294

Fastest lap
- Driver: (Monaco) Stefano Coletti (KV Racing Technology)
- Time: 68.0969 (on lap 56 of 80)

Podium
- First: (New Zealand) Scott Dixon (Chip Ganassi Racing)
- Second: (Brazil) Hélio Castroneves (Team Penske)
- Third: (Colombia) Juan Pablo Montoya (Team Penske)

Chronology
Previous	Next
2014	2016

The 2015 Toyota Grand Prix of Long Beach was the 41st annual running of the Toyota Grand Prix of Long Beach and the third race of the 2015 IndyCar Series season. It took place on April 19, 2015, in Long Beach Street Circuit. It was won by Scott Dixon for the Chip Ganassi Racing team. Hélio Castroneves took second and Juan Pablo Montoya both of whom race for Team Penske. The top finishing rookie in the race, as in the previous round, was Gabby Chaves, who finished in 16th position.

== Report ==
Key	Meaning
R	Rookie
W	Past winner

=== Qualifying ===
Pos	No.	Name	Grp.	Round 1	Round 2	Round 3
1	3	(Brazil) Hélio Castroneves W	1	1:06.9672	1:06.8702	1:06.6294
2	2	(Colombia) Juan Pablo Montoya W	2	1:06.8304	1:06.9419	1:06.6587
3	9	(New Zealand) Scott Dixon	1	1:06.9742	1:06.9819	1:06.7870
4	28	(United States) Ryan Hunter-Reay W	1	1:06.8979	1:07.0307	1:07.0473
5	22	(France) Simon Pagenaud	2	1:07.8440	1:06.7894	1:07.1433
6	67	(United States) Josef Newgarden	2	1:07.9507	1:06.8083	1:07.1716
7	10	(Brazil) Tony Kanaan	1	1:06.7442	1:07.1090	
8	15	(United States) Graham Rahal	1	1:07.1896	1:07.1290	
9	11	(France) Sébastien Bourdais W	2	1:08.5265	1:07.2411	
10	27	(United States) Marco Andretti	2	1:08.5426	1:07.3161	
11	17	(Colombia) Sebastián Saavedra	2	1:07.6781	1:07.3924	
12	26	(Colombia) Carlos Muñoz	1	1:07.1190	1:07.4049	
13	5	(Canada) James Hinchcliffe	1	1:07.3976		
14	20	(Italy) Luca Filippi	2	1:08.6104		
15	83	(United States) Charlie Kimball	1	1:07.4217		
16	41	(United Kingdom) Jack Hawksworth	2	1:08.6276		
17	98	(Colombia) Gabby Chaves R	1	1:07.4653		
18	1	(Australia) Will Power W	2	1:08.8348		
19	7	(United Kingdom) James Jakes	1	1:07.7702		
20	14	(Japan) Takuma Sato W	2	1:08.8732		
21	18	(United States) Conor Daly R	1	1:08.7825		
22	19	(Italy) Francesco Dracone R	2	1:09.8815		
23	4	(Monaco) Stefano Coletti R	2	1:10.4644		
WD	18	(United States) Rocky Moran, Jr. R	Withdrew			
Qualifications

=== Race results ===
Pos	No.	Driver	Team	Engine & Aero Kit	Laps	Time/Retired	Pit Stops	Grid	Laps Led	Pts.^{1}
1	9	(New Zealand) Scott Dixon	Chip Ganassi Racing	Chevrolet	80	1:37:35.2353	2	3	44	53
2	3	(Brazil) Hélio Castroneves W	Team Penske	Chevrolet	80	+2.2221	2	1	31	42
3	2	(Colombia) Juan Pablo Montoya W	Team Penske	Chevrolet	80	+13.4862	2	2		35
4	22	(France) Simon Pagenaud	Team Penske	Chevrolet	80	+13.7382	2	5		32
5	10	(Brazil) Tony Kanaan	Chip Ganassi Racing	Chevrolet	80	+14.6249	2	7		30
6	11	(France) Sébastien Bourdais W	KV Racing Technology	Chevrolet	80	+15.0829	2	9	1	29
7	67	(United States) Josef Newgarden	CFH Racing	Chevrolet	80	+18.8398	2	6		26
8	27	(United States) Marco Andretti	Andretti Autosport	Honda	80	+33.9476	2	10		24
9	26	(Colombia) Carlos Muñoz	Andretti Autosport	Honda	80	+34.9599	2	12		22
10	17	(Colombia) Sebastián Saavedra	Chip Ganassi Racing	Chevrolet	80	+35.5359	2	11		20
11	15	(United States) Graham Rahal	Rahal Letterman Lanigan Racing	Honda	80	+37.4628	2	8		19
12	5	(Canada) James Hinchcliffe	Schmidt Peterson Motorsports	Honda	80	+38.7713	2	13		18
13	28	(United States) Ryan Hunter-Reay W	Andretti Autosport	Honda	80	+40.3347	2	4		17
14	41	(United Kingdom) Jack Hawksworth	A. J. Foyt Enterprises	Honda	80	+41.2744	3	16	4	17
15	83	(United States) Charlie Kimball	Chip Ganassi Racing	Chevrolet	80	+44.3872	4	15		15
16	98	(Colombia) Gabby Chaves R	Bryan Herta Autosport	Honda	80	+46.6589	3	17		14
17	18	(United States) Conor Daly R	Dale Coyne Racing	Honda	80	+50.0574	3	21		13
18	14	(Japan) Takuma Sato W	A. J. Foyt Enterprises	Honda	80	+53.8043	3	20		12
19	7	(United Kingdom) James Jakes	Schmidt Peterson Motorsports	Honda	80	+1:39.7966	3	19		11
20	1	(Australia) Will Power W	Team Penske	Chevrolet	79	+1 Lap	4	18		10
21	19	(Italy) Francesco Dracone R	Dale Coyne Racing	Honda	78	+2 Laps	2	22		9
22	20	(Italy) Luca Filippi	CFH Racing	Chevrolet	77	+3 Laps	4	14		8
23	4	(Monaco) Stefano Coletti R	KV Racing Technology	Chevrolet	69	+11 Laps	4	23		7
OFFICIAL BOX SCORE

Notes

^{1} Points include 1 point for leading at least 1 lap during a race, an additional 2 points for leading the most race laps, and 1 point for Pole Position.

For the first time since race 2 of the 2011 Firestone Twin 275s, every driver finished the race.

== Championship standings after the race ==
Drivers' Championship standings

	Pos	Driver	Points
	1	(Colombia) Juan Pablo Montoya	119
	2	(Brazil) Hélio Castroneves	116
2	3	(Brazil) Tony Kanaan	93
11	4	(New Zealand) Scott Dixon	87
1	5	(Canada) James Hinchcliffe	83

- Note: Only the top five positions are included.

Previous race: 2015 Indy Grand Prix of Louisiana	IndyCar Series; 2015 season	Next race: 2015 Honda Indy Grand Prix of Alabama
Previous race: 2014 Toyota Grand Prix of Long Beach	Toyota Grand Prix of Long Beach	Next race: 2016 Toyota Grand Prix of Long Beach
