= James Jakes =

British racing driver

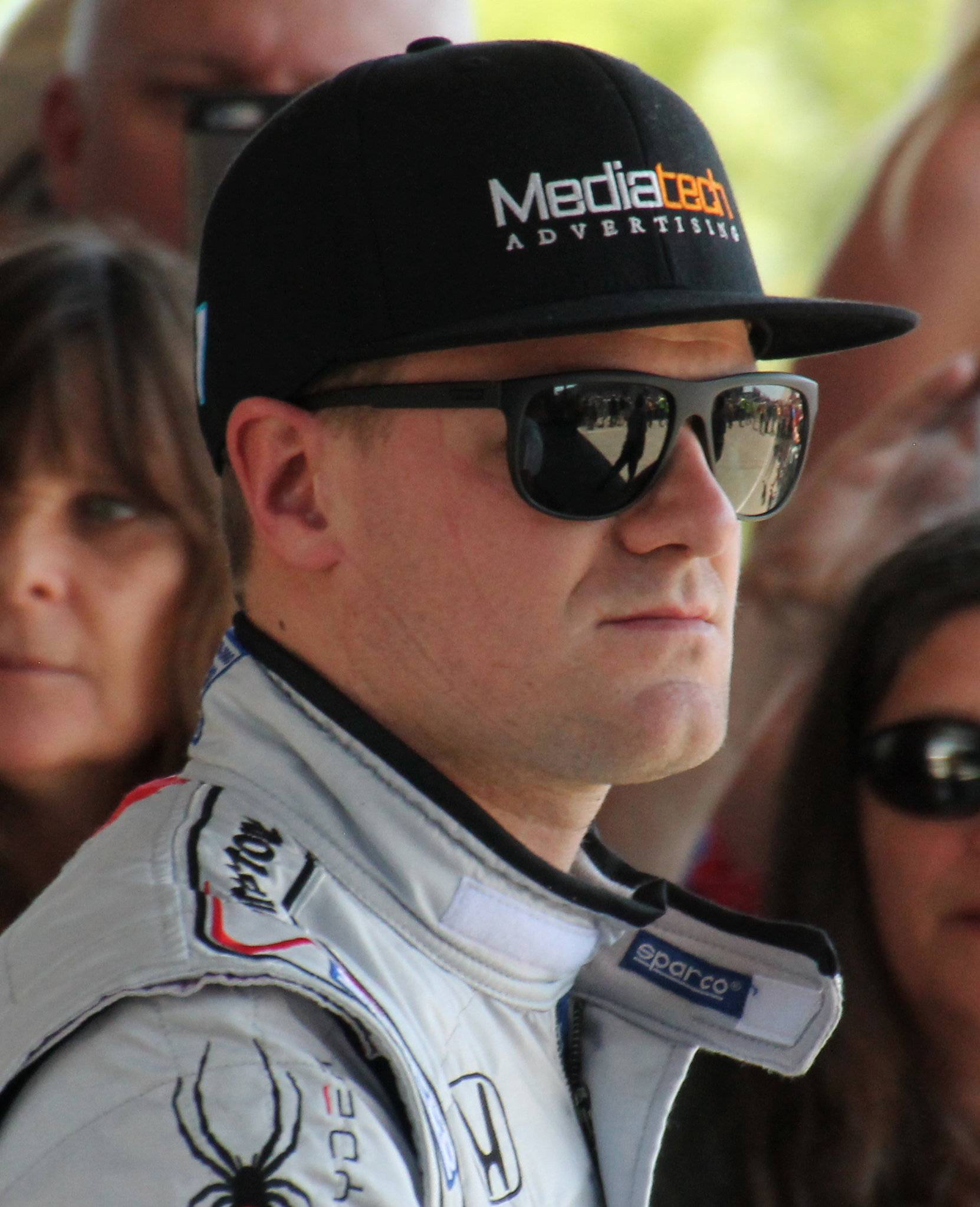
- Jakes at Carb Day 2015 at the Indianapolis Motor Speedway
- Nationality: British
- Born: 4 August 1987 (age 39) Leeds, West Yorkshire, England, UK

IndyCar Series career
- Debut season: 2011
- Categorisation: FIA Gold
- Former teams: Dale Coyne Racing; Rahal Letterman Lanigan Racing; Schmidt Peterson Motorsports

Previous series
- 2002–03 2004–05 2006 2007–08 2008–2010 2010 2010: T-Cars; British Formula Renault; British Formula 3 Formula Three Euroseries; GP2 Asia Series; GP2 Series; GP3 Series

James Jakes (born 4 August 1987 in Leeds, West Yorkshire) is a British professional racing driver who last competed in the GT World Challenge Europe Sprint Cup, where he drove for Comtoyou Racing. He has previously competed in the IndyCar Series, the GP2 Series, and the British Formula 3 Championship.

== Career ==
=== T-Cars ===
Jakes started his racing career in 2002 competing in five rounds of the T-Car Championship. In 2003, Jakes continued in T-cars, finishing second in the championship.

=== Formula Renault ===
For the 2004 season, Jakes moved into the British Formula Renault Championship with Team AKA. Jakes progressed his skills as a racing driver to the point where he was regularly contending for race wins, helping him to attain third in the championship in 2005. His two seasons in Formula Renault also helped him to attain a McLaren Autosport BRDC Award Nomination and also receive BRDC Rising Star status.

=== Formula Three ===
Jakes did one round of the 2005 British Formula 3 Championship in the National Class. In 2006 James made the move to the British Formula 3 Championship full-time with Hitech Racing where he finished eighth and also finished sixth in the Macau Grand Prix.

For 2007, Jakes moved on to the Formula Three Euroseries with Manor Motorsport. He finished fifth in the championship, with one win coming at Magny-Cours. Staying in the championship for the 2008 season, Jakes changed teams to be one of the four drivers at the highly successful ART Grand Prix team. He joined fellow Brit Jon Lancaster in the team, with his other team-mates being Frenchman Jules Bianchi, and German Nico Hülkenberg. He did lie in fifth place at one point in the season, having won on the street circuit at Pau but tailed off to be thirteenth in the championship.

=== GP2 Series ===
Jakes drove in the 2008–09 GP2 Asia Series season for the Super Nova Racing team. He did not race in any category during the summer of 2009, but rejoined Super Nova for the 2009–10 GP2 Asia Series season. He equalled his best finish of third during the first race in Abu Dhabi, but was replaced by the team's 2010 main series driver Marcus Ericsson for the second round. Following the conclusion of the GP3 season, Jakes made his GP2 Series début at the final round of the 2010 season, replacing Álvaro Parente at Scuderia Coloni.

=== GP3 Series ===
Jakes signed to drive for Manor Motorsport in the inaugural GP3 Series season for 2010. Despite missing two rounds of the championship, he scored three podium finishes to take eighth position in the drivers' championship.

=== IndyCar Series ===
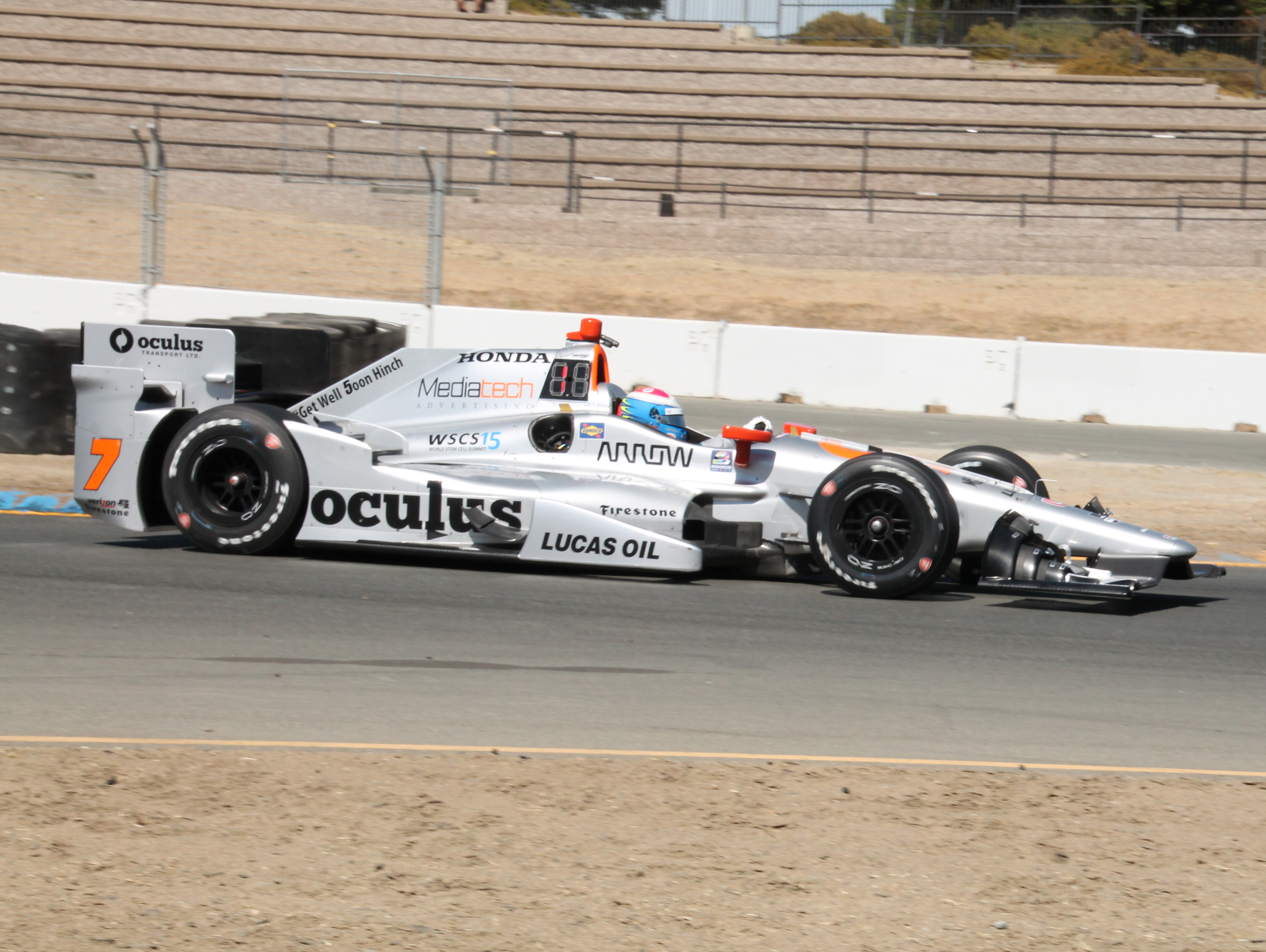
Jakes during practice at the 2015 GoPro Grand Prix of Sonoma

Jakes had signed with Coloni to race in the GP2 Asia Series in 2011, but in March tested an IndyCar Series car for Dale Coyne Racing at Barber Motorsports Park. It was subsequently announced that Jakes would be replaced in Coloni's GP2 car by Luca Filippi and that Jakes would race for Coyne in the 2011 IndyCar Series season. In his debut season, he collected no top-tens and resulted 22nd in the final standings. In 2012, Jakes resulted tenth at Texas Motor Speedway and 8th at the Indy Toronto, repeating his 22nd place in the season standings.

Jakes switched to Rahal Letterman Lanigan Racing for the 2013 season. At Detroit, he finished tenth in the first race and second in the second race. Later he finished sixth in Houston 1. He ended the season nineteenth in the final standings.

After a sabbatical year, Jakes joined Schmidt Peterson Motorsports for the 2015 IndyCar season. He collected a third place in New Orleans.

== Racing record ==
=== Complete Formula 3 Euro Series results ===
(key) (Races in bold indicate pole position) (Races in italics indicate fastest lap)

Year	Entrant	Chassis	Engine	1	2	3	4	5	6	7	8	9	10	11	12	13	14	15	16	17	18	19	20	DC	Points
2006	Hitech Racing	Dallara F305/037	Mercedes	HOC; 1; 9	HOC; 2; 8	LAU; 1	LAU; 2	OSC; 1	OSC; 2	BRH; 1; 5	BRH; 2; 4	NOR; 1	NOR; 2	NÜR; 1	NÜR; 2	ZAN; 1	ZAN; 2	CAT; 1	CAT; 2	LMS; 1	LMS; 2	HOC; 1	HOC; 2	16th	7
2007	Manor Motorsport	Dallara F305/020	Mercedes	HOC; 1; 11	HOC; 2; 5	**BRH**; **1**; 2	BRH; 2; 8	NOR; 1; 6	NOR; 2; 5	MAG; 1; 6	MAG; 2; 1	MUG; 1; 4	MUG; 2 Ret	ZAN; 1; 8	ZAN; 2; 6	NÜR; 1; 4	NÜR; 2; 7	CAT; 1; 4	CAT; 2; 7	NOG; 1; 18	NOG; 2 Ret	HOC; 1; 21†	HOC; 2 Ret	5th	42
2008	ART Grand Prix	Dallara F308/049	Mercedes	HOC; 1; 12	HOC; 2; 11	MUG; 1; 12	MUG; 2; 15	**PAU**; **1**; 1	PAU; 2; 6	NOR; 1; 25	NOR; 2; 13	ZAN; 1; 10	ZAN; 2; 7	NÜR; 1; 24†	NÜR; 2; 22	BRH; 1; 21†	BRH; 2; 17	CAT; 1; 5	CAT; 2; 4	LMS; 1; 13	LMS; 2; 5	HOC; 1; 11	HOC; 2 Ret	13th	19

^{†} Driver did not finish the race, but was classified as he completed over 90% of the race distance.

=== Complete GP2 Series results ===
(key) (Races in bold indicate pole position) (Races in italics indicate fastest lap)

Year	Entrant	1	2	3	4	5	6	7	8	9	10	11	12	13	14	15	16	17	18	19	20	DC	Points
2010	Scuderia Coloni	ESP; FEA	ESP; SPR	MON; FEA	MON; SPR	TUR; FEA	TUR; SPR	VAL; FEA	VAL; SPR	GBR; FEA	GBR; SPR	GER; FEA	GER; SPR	HUN; FEA	HUN; SPR	BEL; FEA	BEL; SPR	ITA; FEA	ITA; SPR	ABU; FEA; 15	ABU; SPR; 18	31st	0

==== Complete GP2 Asia Series results ====
(key) (Races in bold indicate pole position) (Races in italics indicate fastest lap)

Year	Entrant	1	2	3	4	5	6	7	8	9	10	11	12	DC	Points
2008–09	Super Nova Racing	SHI; FEA; Ret	SHI; SPR; 11	DUB; FEA; 12	DUB; SPR; C	BHR1; FEA; 22	BHR1; SPR; Ret	LSL; FEA; 9	LSL; SPR; 9	SEP; FEA; 3	SEP; SPR; Ret	BHR2; FEA; 10	BHR2; SPR; 14	16th	7
2009–10	Super Nova Racing	YMC1; FEA; 3	YMC1; SPR; 10	YMC2; FEA	YMC2; SPR	BHR1; FEA	BHR1; SPR	BHR2; FEA	BHR2; SPR					14th	6
2011	Scuderia Coloni	YMC; FEA; 17	YMC; SPR; 13	IMO; FEA	IMO; SPR									24th	0

=== Complete GP3 Series results ===
(key) (Races in bold indicate pole position) (Races in italics indicate fastest lap)

Year	Entrant	1	2	3	4	5	6	7	8	9	10	11	12	13	14	15	16	DC	Points
2010	Manor Racing	CAT; FEA; 9	CAT; SPR; 7	IST; FEA; 2	IST; SPR; 8	VAL; FEA; 8	VAL; SPR; 3	SIL; FEA; Ret	SIL; SPR; 11	HOC; FEA; 2	HOC; SPR; Ret	HUN; FEA	HUN; SPR	SPA; FEA	SPA; SPR	MNZ; FEA; 13	MNZ; SPR; Ret	8th	21

=== IndyCar Series ===
(key)

Year	Team	No.	Chassis	Engine	1	2	3	4	5	6	7	8	9	10	11	12	13	14	15	16	17	18	19	Rank	Points	Ref
2011	Dale Coyne Racing	18	Dallara IR-05	Honda	STP; 15	ALA; 25	LBH; 15	SAO; 15	INDY; DNQ	TXS; 25	TXS; 28	MIL; 15	IOW; 25	TOR; 18	EDM; 18	MDO; 23	NHM; 18	SNM; 19	BAL; 27	MOT; 13	KTY; 21	LVS^{1} C		22nd	189	
2012	Dale Coyne Racing	19	Dallara DW12	Honda	STP; 26	ALA; 16	LBH; 11	SAO; 15	INDY; 15	DET; 23	TXS; 10	MIL; 21	IOW; 13	TOR; 8	EDM; 25	MDO; 19	SNM; 12	BAL; 24	FON; 12					22nd	232	
2013	Rahal Letterman Lanigan Racing	16	Dallara DW12	Honda	STP; 15	ALA; 23	LBH; 12	SAO; 17	INDY; 20	DET; 10	DET; 2	TXS; 12	MIL; 18	IOW; 18	POC; 12	TOR; 12	TOR; 23	MDO; 13	SNM; 25	BAL; 23	HOU; 6	HOU; 17	FON; 22	19th	294	
2015	Schmidt Peterson Motorsports	7	Dallara DW12	Honda	STP; 22	NLA; 3	LBH; 19	ALA; 22	IMS; 18	INDY; 18	DET; 12	DET; 15	TXS; 9	TOR; 21	FON; 7	MIL; 23	IOW; 15	MDO; 16	POC; 10	SNM; 25				16th	257	

^{1} The Las Vegas Indy 300 was abandoned after Dan Wheldon died from injuries sustained in a 15-car crash on lap 11.

* Season still in progress.

Years	Teams	Races	Poles	Wins	Podiums (Non-win)*	Top 10s (Non-podium)**	Indianapolis 500 Wins	Championships
4	3	65	0	0	2	7	0	0

* Podium (Non-win) indicates 2nd or 3rd place finishes.
** Top 10s (Non-podium) indicates 4th through 10th place finishes.

==== Indianapolis 500 ====
Year	Chassis	Engine	Start	Finish	Team
2011	Dallara	Honda	DNQ		Dale Coyne Racing
2012	Dallara	Honda	17	15	Dale Coyne Racing
2013	Dallara	Honda	20	20	Rahal Letterman Lanigan Racing
2015	Dallara	Honda	20	18	Schmidt Peterson Motorsports

=== Complete FIA World Endurance Championship results ===
Year	Entrant	Class	Car	Engine	1	2	3	4	5	6	7	8	9	Rank	Points
2016	Manor	LMP2	Oreca 05	Nissan VK45DE 4.5 L V8	SIL; Ret	SPA; 8	LMS	NÜR	MEX	COA	FUJ	SHA	BHR	31st	4

=== Complete GT World Challenge Europe Sprint Cup results ===
(key) (Races in bold indicate pole position; results in italics indicate fastest lap)

Year	Team	Car	Class	1	2	3	4	5	6	7	8	9	10	Pos.	Points
2024	Comtoyou Racing	Aston Martin Vantage AMR GT3 Evo	Gold	BRH; 1; 23	BRH; 2; 24	MIS; 1; 28	MIS; 2; 31	HOC; 1; 28	HOC; 2 Ret	MAG; 1; 32†	MAG; 2; 15	CAT; 1 Ret	CAT; 2 Ret	6th	42

^{†} Driver did not finish the race, but was classified as he completed over 90% of the race distance.
