= 2015 Firestone 600 =

(United States) 2015 Firestone 600
Race details
9th round of the 2015 IndyCar Series season
← Previous race	Next race →
- Date: June 6, 2015
- Official name: Firestone 600
- Location: Texas Motor Speedway
- Course: Permanent racing facility 1.5 mi / 2.4 km
- Distance: 248 laps 372 mi / 595.2 km
- Weather: 86 °F (30 °C), clear

Pole position
- Driver: (Australia) Will Power (Team Penske)
- Time: 23.9500 + 23.9910 = 47.9410

Fastest lap
- Driver: (Australia) Will Power (Team Penske)
- Time: 24.1743 seconds (on lap 49 of 248)

Podium
- First: (New Zealand) Scott Dixon (Chip Ganassi Racing)
- Second: (Brazil) Tony Kanaan (Chip Ganassi Racing)
- Third: (Brazil) Hélio Castroneves (Team Penske)

The 2015 Firestone 600 was the ninth round of the 2015 IndyCar Series season. It took take place on Saturday, June 6. The race was contested over 248 laps at the 1.5-mile (2.4 km) Texas Motor Speedway in Fort Worth, Texas, and was televised by NBCSN in the United States. It marked the 27th IndyCar race held at the speedway since it was first held there in 1997.

== Background ==
The second race in last week's rounds 7 and 8 in the IndyCar series marked the first time all season that a race finished without a Penske or Ganassi driver among the top two places. The top performance by either of the super teams was a third-place showing by Penske’s Simon Pagenaud in first race of the dual in Detroit on Saturday. It also marked the best showing by Honda cars with the manufacturer taking 1-2 in the first race, and 2-3 in the second race.

== Report ==
=== Qualifying ===
Initial practice and qualifying took place in the afternoon on Friday June 5, 2015 with a final practice occurring later that evening.

Pos	No.	Name	Lap 1	Lap 2	Total Time
1	1	(Australia) Will Power W	23.9500	23.9910	47.9410
2	22	(France) Simon Pagenaud	23.9458	24.0122	47.9580
3	3	(Brazil) Hélio Castroneves W	23.9612	24.0786	48.0398
4	26	(Colombia) Carlos Muñoz	24.0177	24.0746	48.0923
5	2	(Colombia) Juan Pablo Montoya	24.0416	24.1173	48.1589
6	15	(United States) Graham Rahal	24.0610	24.1182	48.1792
7	9	(New Zealand) Scott Dixon W	24.0594	24.1259	48.1853
8	10	(Brazil) Tony Kanaan W	24.0665	24.1351	48.2016
9	83	(United States) Charlie Kimball	24.0897	24.1150	48.2047
10	8	(United States) Sage Karam R	24.1390	24.1552	48.2942
11	27	(United States) Marco Andretti	24.1290	24.1752	48.3042
12	7	(United Kingdom) James Jakes	24.0723	24.2344	48.3067
13	14	(Japan) Takuma Sato	24.1562	24.1903	48.3465
14	67	(United States) Josef Newgarden	24.1572	24.2958	48.4530
15	20	(United States) Ed Carpenter W	24.2105	24.2453	48.4558
16	19	(France) Tristan Vautier	24.2517	24.2643	48.5160
17	41	(United Kingdom) Jack Hawksworth	24.2722	24.3131	48.5853
18	11	(France) Sébastien Bourdais	24.3140	24.3429	48.6569
19	5	(Australia) Ryan Briscoe W	24.4444	24.2444	48.6888
20	98	(Colombia) Gabby Chaves R	24.3376	24.3550	48.6926
21	28	(United States) Ryan Hunter-Reay	24.3495	24.3703	48.7198
22	18	(United Kingdom) Pippa Mann	24.3600	24.4441	48.8041
23	4	(Monaco) Stefano Coletti R	24.6630	24.7685	49.4315
Qualifications

=== Race summary ===
The race took place on the evening of Saturday June 6, 2015 and was the fastest IndyCar Series race ever run at the Texas Motor Speedway with an average speed of 191.940 mph. It was a relative clean contest with only one caution occurring between laps 84 to 96, which was due to non-contact debris on the front stretch of the track, during the entire 248 lap race. Pole driver Will Power had the lead for the first 7 laps of the race, when Simon Pagenaud took the lead from him and held it for the next 59 laps of the race. Multiple pit stops by others further back in the field to make wing and tire adjustments shuffled the order and put several drivers one to three laps down. Finding the right balance of downforce and tire wear and press would prove pivotal in the race. In lap 67, Tony Kanaan took the lead. During the caution beginning in lap 84, pretty much the entire field pitted, and pit times resulted in a major reshuffling of order once again with Juan Pablo Montoya holding the lead when the race resumed on lap 96, with Kanaan retaking the lead on lap 103.

As cars pitted for fuel beginning in lap 138, the lead was again reshuffled, with the lead passing to Scott Dixon, Hélio Castroneves, James Jakes and then back to Dixon. Another round of pitting for fuel again reshuffled the lead over a ten lap period, with Kanaan, then Castroneves and then Marco Andretti taking the lead. Dixon re-took the lead on lap 194 and would maintain lead for the rest of the race with the except of his taking his final pit stop for fuel on lap 228 end up having the lead for a total of 97 laps, eclipsing his season total of 59 in laps led in one race. He would go on to win the race, which his Chip Ganassi Racing teammate Kanaan taking second, and Castroneves taking the third podium position for Team Penske. The top 4 finishers were all Chevrolet cars which dominated the race and the top finishers suggest high downforce will be the way to success on oval courses for the remainder of the season.

=== Race results ===
Pos	No.	Driver	Team	Engine & Aero Kit	Laps	Time/Retired	Pit Stops	Grid	Laps Led	Pts.
1	9	(New Zealand) Scott Dixon W	Chip Ganassi Racing	Chevrolet	248	1:52:47.8511; 191.94 mph	5	7	97	53
2	10	(Brazil) Tony Kanaan W	Chip Ganassi Racing	Chevrolet	248	+7.8000	5	8	57	41
3	3	(Brazil) Hélio Castroneves W	Team Penske	Chevrolet	248	+9.9446	5	3	7	36
4	2	(Colombia) Juan Pablo Montoya	Team Penske	Chevrolet	248	+10.4608	5	5	16	33
5	27	(United States) Marco Andretti	Andretti Autosport	Honda	248	+26.0947	4	11	2	31
6	26	(Colombia) Carlos Muñoz	Andretti Autosport	Honda	247	+1 Lap	4	4		28
7	83	(United States) Charlie Kimball	Chip Ganassi Racing	Chevrolet	247	+1 Lap	5	9	1	27
8	5	(Australia) Ryan Briscoe W	Schmidt Peterson Motorsports	Honda	247	+1 Lap	5	19		24
9	7	(United Kingdom) James Jakes	Schmidt Peterson Motorsports	Honda	247	+1 Lap	4	12	2	23
10	98	(Colombia) Gabby Chaves R	Bryan Herta Autosport	Honda	246	+2 Laps	5	20		20
11	22	(France) Simon Pagenaud	Team Penske	Chevrolet	246	+2 Laps	4	2	59	20
12	8	(United States) Sage Karam R	Chip Ganassi Racing	Chevrolet	245	+3 Laps	6	10		18
13	1	(Australia) Will Power W	Team Penske	Chevrolet	244	+4 Laps	5	1	7	19
14	11	(France) Sébastien Bourdais	KV Racing Technology	Chevrolet	244	+4 Laps	7	18		16
15	15	(United States) Graham Rahal	Rahal Letterman Lanigan Racing	Honda	243	+5 Laps	6	6		15
16	14	(Japan) Takuma Sato	A. J. Foyt Enterprises	Honda	243	+5 Laps	8	13		14
17	18	(United Kingdom) Pippa Mann	Dale Coyne Racing	Honda	242	+6 Laps	5	22		13
18	28	(United States) Ryan Hunter-Reay	Andretti Autosport	Honda	241	+7 Laps	7	21		12
19	4	(Monaco) Stefano Coletti R	KV Racing Technology	Chevrolet	239	+9 Laps	8	23		11
20	19	(France) Tristan Vautier	Dale Coyne Racing	Honda	156	Wheel bearing	3	16		10
21	67	(United States) Josef Newgarden	CFH Racing	Chevrolet	149	Engine	5	14		9
22	20	(United States) Ed Carpenter W	CFH Racing	Chevrolet	147	Engine	4	15		8
23	41	(United Kingdom) Jack Hawksworth	A. J. Foyt Enterprises	Honda	62	Suspension	4	17		7
OFFICIAL BOX SCORE

Key	Meaning
R	Rookie
W	Past winner

== Championship standings after the race ==
Drivers' standings

Pos	Driver	Points
1	(Colombia) Juan Pablo Montoya	348
2	(Australia) Will Power	313
3	(New Zealand) Scott Dixon	305
4	(Brazil) Hélio Castroneves	286
5	(United States) Graham Rahal	261

- Note: Only the top five positions are included.

Previous race: 2015 Detroit Belle Isle Grand Prix	IndyCar Series; 2015 season	Next race: 2015 Honda Indy Toronto
Previous race: 2014 Firestone 600	Firestone 600	Next race: 2016 Firestone 600
