= 2015 ABC Supply Wisconsin 250 =

(United States) 2015 ABC Supply Wisconsin 250
Race details
12th round of the 2015 IndyCar Series season
← Previous race	Next race →
- Layout of the Milwaukee Mile circuit
- Date: July 12, 2015
- Official name: ABC Supply Wisconsin 250
- Location: Milwaukee Mile, West Allis, Wisconsin, U.S.
- Course: Permanent racing facility 1.015 mi / 1.633 km
- Distance: 250 laps 253.750 mi / 408.371 km
- Weather: Temperatures reaching up to 81 °F (27 °C); wind speeds approaching speeds of 8.06 miles per hour (12.97 km/h)

Pole position
- Driver: (United States) Josef Newgarden (CFH Racing)
- Time: 170.223 mph (2-lap)

Fastest lap
- Driver: (Brazil) Hélio Castroneves (Team Penske)
- Time: 22.1211 (on lap 237 of 250)

Podium
- First: (France) Sébastien Bourdais (KV Racing Technology)
- Second: (Brazil) Hélio Castroneves (Team Penske)
- Third: (United States) Graham Rahal (Rahal Letterman Lanigan Racing)

Chronology
Previous	Next
2014	2024

The 2015 ABC Supply Wisconsin 250 was an IndyCar Series event that was contested at Milwaukee Mile in West Allis, Wisconsin. The race served as the 12th race of the 2015 IndyCar Series season. The race was won by Sébastien Bourdais his second win at Milwaukee. IndyCar did not return to the track until the 2024 season.

== Background ==
As the Milwaukee Mile is owned by the State of Wisconsin as part of the Wisconsin State Fair Park, the track is leased to promoter groups to organize races at the track. By 2009, the then-current promoter group, Wisconsin Motorsports, was heavily in debt, reportedly owing millions to IndyCar and NASCAR. As a result, both NASCAR and IndyCar dropped the Milwaukee Mile from their 2010 schedules.

On September 10, 2010, IndyCar announced a return to the Milwaukee Mile with a new promoter group, a joint venture between Avocado Motorsports Marketing and BMG Event Productions. The June 2011 race saw very poor attendance, blamed mostly on high ticket prices. The race was dropped again for the 2012 season and the relationship with Avocado Motorsports Marketing was ended.

In March 2012, the race at Milwaukee was re-added to the IndyCar schedule, now promoted by Andretti Sports Marketing, a company owned by Michael Andretti. ASM paid the State Fair Park a fee of $25,000 to rent the track.

The event struggled to gain an audience as it switched from June to August in 2014, and then moved to July in 2015. Andretti Sports Marketing attempted to replicate the successes of street course events by holding concerts and a carnival-like midway with rides and attractions.

Beginning in 2014, the Milwaukee event reached a two-year agreement with ABC Supply to serve as title sponsor.

== Report ==
=== Practice ===
The first practice session was held on Saturday evening. Josef Newgarden was the fastest car in the 45 minute session. Simon Pagenaud was second quickest, followed by Takuma Sato in third.

Second practice was held on Sunday morning at 9:15 a.m. Again, Newgarden was fastest, followed by Helio Castroneves and Graham Rahal.

=== Qualifying ===
Qualifying was held at 12:30 on Sunday. Josef Newgarden posted the fastest speed with a two-lap average of 170.223 mph to win his first career IndyCar pole position. Ryan Briscoe joined Newgarden on the front row with a speed of 170.086 mph, the only other driver to post a speed over 170 mph.

Points leader, Juan Pablo Montoya posted the eighth-fastest speed. Montoya's Team Penske teammate, Helio Castroneves, was unable to make a qualifying run as his team was 10 minutes late in getting his car to the inspection line.

=== Qualifying classification ===
Key	Meaning
R	Rookie
W	Past winner

Pos	No.	Driver	Team	Engine	Time	Final grid							
Pos	No.	Driver	Team	Engine	Time	Final grid	1	67	(United States) Josef Newgarden	CFH Racing	Chevrolet	42.9320	1
Pos	No.	Driver	Team	Engine	Time	Final grid	2	5	(Australia) Ryan Briscoe W	Schmidt Peterson Motorsports	Honda	42.9666	2
3	8	(United States) Sage Karam R	Chip Ganassi Racing	Chevrolet	43.0797	3							
4	10	(Brazil) Tony Kanaan W	Chip Ganassi Racing	Chevrolet	43.1043	4							
5	7	(United Kingdom) James Jakes	Schmidt Peterson Motorsports	Honda	43.1616	5							
6	15	(United States) Graham Rahal	Rahal Letterman Lanigan Racing	Honda	43.2104	6							
7	83	(United States) Charlie Kimball	Chip Ganassi Racing	Chevrolet	43.2114	7							
8	2	(Colombia) Juan Pablo Montoya	Team Penske	Chevrolet	43.2150	8							
9	27	(United States) Marco Andretti	Andretti Autosport	Honda	43.2442	9							
10	9	(New Zealand) Scott Dixon W	Chip Ganassi Racing	Chevrolet	43.3324	10							
11	11	(France) Sébastien Bourdais	KVSH Racing	Chevrolet	43.3807	11							
12	98	(Colombia) Gabby Chaves R	Bryan Herta Autosport	Honda	43.4060	12							
13	14	(Japan) Takuma Sato	A. J. Foyt Racing	Honda	43.4256	13							
14	1	(Australia) Will Power W	Team Penske	Chevrolet	43.5058	14							
15	25	(United Kingdom) Justin Wilson	Andretti Autosport	Honda	43.5356	15							
16	28	(United States) Ryan Hunter-Reay W	Andretti Autosport	Honda	43.5803	16							
17	22	(France) Simon Pagenaud	Team Penske	Chevrolet	43.6502	17							
18	26	(Colombia) Carlos Muñoz	Andretti Autosport	Honda	43.8801	18							
19	4	(Monaco) Stefano Coletti R	KV Racing Technology	Chevrolet	43.9156	19							
20	19	(France) Tristan Vautier	Dale Coyne Racing	Honda	44.0809	20							
21	41	(United Kingdom) Jack Hawksworth	A. J. Foyt Racing	Honda	44.3373	21							
22	20	(United States) Ed Carpenter	CFH Racing	Chevrolet	44.5597	22							
23	18	(United Kingdom) Pippa Mann	Dale Coyne Racing	Honda	45.9006	23							
24	3	(Brazil) Hélio Castroneves	Team Penske	Chevrolet	No Time	24							
Official Report

=== Race ===
The race started at 4:40 p.m. local time. An estimated 12,000 spectators were in the stands, roughly one-third of the 37,000 capacity grandstands. The command to start engines was given by Diane Hendricks, chairperson of ABC Supply.

When the race began, Josef Newgarden pulled away to a lead with Ryan Briscoe in close pursuit. The leaders made their first pit stops under green on lap 55. A malfunctioning air jack led to a lengthy stop for Ryan Briscoe and removed him from contention for the win. Newgarden resumed the lead, followed by Scott Dixon, and Sébastien Bourdais, who climbed from his 11th starting spot.

Dixon made his second pit stop on lap 100. Newgarden pitted two laps later. Once pit stops had cycled through, Dixon had taken the lead by around one second over Newgarden.

The first caution came out on lap 114 when James Jakes blew an engine and stopped against the wall in turn one. Dixon and Newgarden pitted under caution while Bourdais chose to stay on track and take the lead.

After a 16 lap cleanup, the race restarted on lap 130. Before one lap could be completed, Ryan Briscoe spun in turn three and collected Will Power. Both cars impacted the wall and retired from the race.

Bourdais continued to lead until lap 171 when he pitted under green for tires and fuel. With fresh tires, Bourdais climbed through the field with ease. Bourdais retook the lead on lap 188 when Josef Newgarden pitted. On lap 184, Sage Karam impacted the wall with the right rear and entered pit road. He retired from the race, but did not bring out a caution.

As other cars pitted, Bourdais held a lap lead over the field as he made his final pitstop on lap 213. He was able to pit and maintain his lead.

On lap 222, Justin Wilson blew an engine and stopped in turn one, bringing out the third and final caution of the day. Bourdais, Montoya, and Ed Carpenter stayed out on track while all other lead lap cars pitted.

When the green flag returned with 19 laps remaining, Bourdais again extended his lead. On fresh tires, Helio Castroneves climbed to second place but was unable to catch Bourdais. Bourdais won by 2.237 seconds and earned his first win on an oval since Milwaukee in 2006. Castroneves was second, followed by Graham Rahal in third.

=== Race classification ===
Pos	No.	Driver	Team	Engine	Laps	Time/Retired	Pit Stops	Grid	Laps Led	Pts.
1	11	(France) Sébastien Bourdais	KV Racing Technology	Chevrolet	250	1:56:46.8264	4	11	118	53
2	3	(Brazil) Hélio Castroneves	Team Penske	Chevrolet	250	+2.2366	5	24		40
3	15	(United States) Graham Rahal	Rahal Letterman Lanigan Racing	Honda	250	+2.8785	5	6	5	36
4	2	(Colombia) Juan Pablo Montoya	Team Penske	Chevrolet	250	+10.0028	7	8		32
5	67	(United States) Josef Newgarden	CFH Racing	Chevrolet	250	+11.5475	5	1	109	32
6	10	(Brazil) Tony Kanaan	Chip Ganassi Racing	Chevrolet	250	+12.4000	5	4	3	29
7	9	(New Zealand) Scott Dixon	Chip Ganassi Racing	Chevrolet	250	+12.9983	5	10	14	27
8	27	(United States) Marco Andretti	Andretti Autosport	Honda	250	+13.0633	5	9		24
9	22	(France) Simon Pagenaud	Team Penske	Chevrolet	250	+13.6952	5	17		22
10	20	(United States) Ed Carpenter	CFH Racing	Chevrolet	250	+15.4357	8	22		20
11	98	(Colombia) Gabby Chaves R	Bryan Herta Autosport	Honda	250	+16.6016	5	12		19
12	83	(United States) Charlie Kimball	Chip Ganassi Racing	Chevrolet	250	+17.4201	6	7		18
13	28	(United States) Ryan Hunter-Reay W	Andretti Autosport	Honda	250	+17.9431	5	16		17
14	14	(Japan) Takuma Sato	A. J. Foyt Racing	Honda	250	+18.3184	4	13		16
15	26	(Colombia) Carlos Muñoz	Andretti Autosport	Honda	250	+18.9050	6	18		15
16	19	(France) Tristan Vautier	Dale Coyne Racing	Honda	248	+2 Laps	5	20		14
17	41	(United Kingdom) Jack Hawksworth	A. J. Foyt Racing	Honda	221	+29 Laps	7	21		13
18	25	(United Kingdom) Justin Wilson	Andretti Autosport	Honda	219	Mechanical	6	15	1	13
19	8	(United States) Sage Karam R	Chip Ganassi Racing	Chevrolet	183	Contact	3	3		11
20	4	(Monaco) Stefano Coletti R	KV Racing Technology	Chevrolet	156	Mechanical	2	19		10
21	5	(Australia) Ryan Briscoe W	Schmidt Peterson Motorsports	Honda	130	Contact	2	2		9
22	1	(Australia) Will Power W	Team Penske	Chevrolet	130	Contact	3	14		8
23	7	(United Kingdom) James Jakes	Schmidt Peterson Motorsports	Honda	113	Mechanical	2	5		7
24	18	(United Kingdom) Pippa Mann	Dale Coyne Racing	Honda	27	Handling	0	23		6
Fastest lap: (Brazil) Hélio Castroneves (Team Penske) – 22.1211(Lap 237)
Official Results

== Aftermath ==
The attendance of roughly 12,000 raised questions over whether the event would continue in 2016. It appeared that whether or not the event would return was a matter of extending the ABC Supply title sponsorship past their 2015 commitment.

One month after the Milwaukee event, Andretti Sports Marketing filed a lawsuit against Andretti Autosport, alleging that the race team withheld funds intended for ASM in order to cover debts the race team incurred. United Fiber and Data failed to meet their sponsor obligations in 2014 for the car driven by James Hinchcliffe, leading to mounting debt for the team. It also sought to reinstate John Lopes as company manager who was recently released from the company.

Michael Andretti called the suit "a disingenuous and self-serving attempt to benefit John Lopes and Starke Taylor (ASM Chief Marketing Officer) at the expense of Andretti Autosport and its 120 employees."

A settlement for the suit was reached in mid-August when Michael Andretti agreed to sell his 60 percent ownership stake in Andretti Sports Marketing. As ASM was dissolved, it left the Milwaukee 250 without a promoter group. Officials from Road America briefly considered promoting the event, but decided against it as Road America was added to the 2016 IndyCar schedule for the first time since 2007. When the 2016 schedule was released, it was confirmed the Milwaukee race would not return. In 2024, Milwaukee returned to the IndyCar schedule with a double-header weekend.

== Broadcasting ==
In the United States, the race was broadcast by NBCSN. The booth announcers were Leigh Diffey, Paul Tracy, Townsend Bell, and David Hobbs. A qualifying show was broadcast on NBCSN immediately prior to the race coverage. In the United States, the race had a 0.36 television rating and was watched by 532,000 viewers.
