= 2015 Honda Indy Grand Prix of Alabama =

(United States) 2015 Alabama
Race details
3rd round of the 2015 IndyCar Series season
← Previous race	Next race →
- Date: April 26, 2015
- Official name: Indy Grand Prix of Alabama
- Location: Barber Motorsports Park; Birmingham, Alabama
- Course: Road Course; 2.38 mi / 3.83 km
- Distance: 90 laps 214.2 mi / 344.7 km

Pole position
- Driver: (Brazil) Hélio Castroneves (Team Penske)
- Time: 1:07.1925

Fastest lap
- Driver: (New Zealand) Ryan Hunter-Reay (Andretti Autosport)
- Time: 69.7188 (on lap 16 of 90)

Podium
- First: (United States) Josef Newgarden (CFH Racing)
- Second: (United States) Graham Rahal (Rahal Letterman Lanigan Racing)
- Third: (New Zealand) Scott Dixon (Chip Ganassi Racing)

The 2015 Indy Grand Prix of Alabama was the fourth race of the 2015 IndyCar Series season. The race was run on Sunday April 26, 2015 in Birmingham, Alabama, United States at Barber Motorsports Park, the sixth time the Indy Grand Prix of Alabama was run. It was won by Josef Newgarden for the CFH Racing team. Graham Rahal took second for Rahal Letterman Lanigan Racing and Scott Dixon who races for Chip Ganassi Racing came in third. The top finishing rookie in the race, as he was in all three previous rounds in this years series, Gabby Chaves who finished 16th in the race as he did in the previous round.

== Report ==
Key	Meaning
R	Rookie
W	Past winner

=== Qualifying ===
Pos	No.	Name	Grp.	Round 1	Round 2	Round 3
1	3	(Brazil) Hélio Castroneves W	1	1:07.2631	1:06.8790	1:07.1925
2	1	(Australia) Will Power W	2	1:06.9973	1:06.8050	1:07.3833
3	22	(France) Simon Pagenaud	1	1:07.1072	1:07.0586	1:07.6383
4	9	(New Zealand) Scott Dixon	2	1:06.9406	1:07.0940	1:07.6938
5	67	(United States) Josef Newgarden	1	1:07.2853	1:07.2251	1:07.8922
6	10	(Brazil) Tony Kanaan	2	1:07.6242	1:07.2059	1:07.9426
7	11	(France) Sébastien Bourdais	2	1:07.3141	1:07.2462	
8	15	(United States) Graham Rahal	1	1:07.5198	1:07.3903	
9	20	(Italy) Luca Filippi	1	1:07.5198	1:07.6302	
10	5	(Canada) James Hinchcliffe	2	1:07.4708	1:07.6626	
11	83	(United States) Charlie Kimball	2	1:07.3842	1:07.8405	
12	8	(United States) Sage Karam R	1	1:07.5355	1:07.8930	
13	27	(United States) Marco Andretti	1	1:07.6295		
14	7	(United Kingdom) James Jakes	2	1:07.9671		
15	2	(Colombia) Juan Pablo Montoya	1	1:07.7235		
16	4	(Monaco) Stefano Coletti R	2	1:07.9947		
17	98	(Colombia) Gabby Chaves R	1	1:07.8191		
18	28	(United States) Ryan Hunter-Reay W	2	1:07.9984		
19	41	(United Kingdom) Jack Hawksworth	1	1:08.0082		
20	14	(Japan) Takuma Sato	2	1:08.2541		
21	18	(Venezuela) Rodolfo González R	1	1:08.5259		
22	26	(Colombia) Carlos Muñoz	2	1:08.3533		
23	19	(Italy) Francesco Dracone R	2	1:10.1133		
Qualifications

=== Race results ===
Pos	No.	Driver	Team	Engine & Aero Kit	Laps	Time/Retired	Pit Stops	Grid	Laps Led	Pts.^{1}
1	67	(United States) Josef Newgarden	CFH Racing	Chevrolet	90	1:55:53.0630	3	5	46	53
2	15	(United States) Graham Rahal	Rahal Letterman Lanigan Racing	Honda	90	+2.2061	3	8	17	41
3	9	(New Zealand) Scott Dixon	Chip Ganassi Racing	Chevrolet	90	+4.8371	3	4	2	36
4	1	(Australia) Will Power W	Team Penske	Chevrolet	90	+19.4903	4	2		32
5	28	(United States) Ryan Hunter-Reay W	Andretti Autosport	Honda	90	+22.0663	3	18		30
6	26	(Colombia) Carlos Muñoz	Andretti Autosport	Honda	90	+24.0595	3	22		28
7	5	(Canada) James Hinchcliffe	Schmidt Peterson Motorsports	Honda	90	+24.6529	3	10	1	27
8	11	(France) Sébastien Bourdais	KV Racing Technology	Chevrolet	90	+25.4534	3	7	2	25
9	22	(France) Simon Pagenaud	Team Penske	Chevrolet	90	+30.6139	3	3	3	23
10	27	(United States) Marco Andretti	Andretti Autosport	Honda	90	+33.4777	3	13		20
11	20	(Italy) Luca Filippi	CFH Racing	Chevrolet	90	+34.1607	3	9		19
12	83	(United States) Charlie Kimball	Chip Ganassi Racing	Chevrolet	90	+34.6792	3	11		18
13	10	(Brazil) Tony Kanaan	Chip Ganassi Racing	Chevrolet	90	+35.3334	3	6		17
14	2	(Colombia) Juan Pablo Montoya	Team Penske	Chevrolet	90	+36.6361	4	15		17
15	3	(Brazil) Hélio Castroneves W	Team Penske	Chevrolet	90	+39.4194	4	1	18	17
16	98	(Colombia) Gabby Chaves R	Bryan Herta Autosport	Honda	90	+45.8965	3	17		14
17	14	(Japan) Takuma Sato	A. J. Foyt Enterprises	Honda	90	+50.8442	3	20		13
18	8	(United States) Sage Karam R	Chip Ganassi Racing	Chevrolet	90	+55.1372	5	12		12
19	4	(Monaco) Stefano Coletti R	KV Racing Technology	Chevrolet	90	+55.4160	5	16		11
20	18	(Venezuela) Rodolfo González R	Dale Coyne Racing	Honda	90	+1:07.9855	4	21		10
21	41	(United Kingdom) Jack Hawksworth	A. J. Foyt Enterprises	Honda	90	+1:13.1828	3	19		9
22	7	(United Kingdom) James Jakes	Schmidt Peterson Motorsports	Honda	89	+1 Lap	4	14		8
23	19	(Italy) Francesco Dracone R	Dale Coyne Racing	Honda	89	+1 Lap	4	23		7
OFFICIAL BOX SCORE

Notes

^{1} Points include 1 point for leading at least 1 lap during a race, an additional 2 points for leading the most race laps, and 1 point for Pole Position.

For the second straight race there were no DNF's

== Championship standings after the race ==
Drivers' Championship standings

	Pos	Driver	Points
	1	(Colombia) Juan Pablo Montoya	136
	2	(Brazil) Hélio Castroneves	133
1	3	(New Zealand) Scott Dixon	123
5	4	(United States) Josef Newgarden	119
1	5	(Australia) Will Power	112

- Note: Only the top five positions are included.

Previous race: 2015 Toyota Grand Prix of Long Beach	IndyCar Series; 2015 season	Next race: 2015 Grand Prix of Indianapolis
Previous race: 2014 Honda Indy Grand Prix of Alabama	Indy Grand Prix of Alabama	Next race: 2016 Honda Indy Grand Prix of Alabama
