= 2015 ABC Supply 500 =

INDYCAR Motor car race

(United States) 2015 ABC Supply 500
Race details
15th round of the 2015 IndyCar Series season
← Previous race	Next race →
- Date: August 23, 2015
- Official name: ABC Supply 500
- Location: Pocono Raceway, Long Pond, Pennsylvania, U.S.
- Course: Permanent racing facility 2.500 mi / 4.023 km
- Distance: 200 laps 500.000 mi / 804.67 km
- Weather: Temperatures reaching up to 81 °F (27 °C); wind speeds approaching speeds of 8.06 miles per hour (12.97 km/h)

Pole position
- Driver: (Brazil) Hélio Castroneves (Team Penske)
- Time: 1:21.6217 (2-lap)

Fastest lap
- Driver: (Colombia) Juan Pablo Montoya (Team Penske)
- Time: 40.9927 (on lap 125 of 200)

Podium
- First: (United States) Ryan Hunter-Reay (Andretti Autosport)
- Second: (United States) Josef Newgarden (CFH Racing)
- Third: (Colombia) Juan Pablo Montoya (Team Penske)

The 2015 ABC Supply 500 was an IndyCar Series event that was contested at Pocono Raceway in Long Pond, Pennsylvania. The race served as the penultimate race of the 2015 IndyCar Series season, and was the third and final leg of the season's Fuzzy's Ultra Premium Vodka IndyCar Triple Crown.

The race was won by Ryan Hunter-Reay driving the No. 28 DHL Dallara-Honda for Andretti Autosport. It was marred, however, by a crash involving Sage Karam twenty one laps from the finish that resulted in Justin Wilson being hit by the nose cone from Karam's car and suffering a fatal head injury. Wilson died the next day on August 24, 2015.

== Background ==
=== Practice 1 ===
Two and a half hours of practice began at 8:30 a.m. on Saturday morning. The first hour was reserved for rookies and part-time drivers only. Beginning at 9:30 a.m., all cars could practice. Charlie Kimball posted the fastest speed at 221.373 mph, the only car to go above 221 mph. Rookie Sage Karam was second fastest at 220.788 mph, followed by Simon Pagenaud at 220.629 mph. Takuma Sato, fifth quickest, was the fastest Honda. At the end of the session, Stefano Coletti brushed the wall in turn three and damaged the steering enough to send him lightly into the pit wall.

=== Time Trials ===
Helio Castroneves won the pole with a two-lap average speed of 220.530 mph. Castroneves' Team Penske teammates Simon Pagenaud was second at 220.485 mph and Will Power third at 220.398 mph.

Charlie Kimball crashed in turn three on his first qualifying lap. Kimball lost control at the apex of turn three and impacted the wall with the left side. Similar to the crashes of Josef Newgarden and Ed Carpenter earlier that year at Indianapolis, air got under Kimball's car and lifted it off the ground. The car landed on top of the SAFER barrier, slid along the wall, and impacted a fence pole with the rear wing. Kimball was uninjured and the team switched to a backup car. Qualifying was delayed 48 minutes to repair the catchfence.

=== Practice 2 ===
A 30-minute final practice session was held at 6:15 p.m. on Saturday evening. Polesitter Helio Castroneves posted the fastest speed at 220.227 mph.

=== Race Recap ===
The pole position was won by Hélio Castroneves of Team Penske, driving the No. 3 car. Penske Chevrolets qualified in the first three positions, with Castroneves' teammate Simon Pagenaud starting alongside him in the No. 22 and defending series champion Will Power behind him in position three.

When the field rounded turn three to take the green flag, Castroneves accelerated in turn three. Officials believed Castroneves went too early and waved off the green flag. On the second attempt, Castroneves again accelerated in turn three and the start was waved off a second time. On the third attempt for a start, the green flag was waved and Castroneves was quickly caught by the trailing cars. The cars entered turn one four-wide as Pagenaud and Power pulled to the inside of Castroneves while Josef Newgarden moved to the outside. Newgarden took the lead in turn one, with Pagenaud second and Castroneves third. From his seventh starting position, Justin Wilson had climbed to third by the exit of turn one.

Green flag pitstops began around lap 29, with the race leader Newgarden among the first to pit. Leaving the pits, the left-rear wheel fell off the car of Jack Hawksworth and a caution was waved to retrieve it. The caution rearranged the running order, with Newgarden retaining the lead while Justin Wilson moved to second and Carlos Munoz in third. On the restart, Sébastien Bourdais drifted out of the groove in turn one and lost control. He spun and impacted the wall with the left side of the car.

When the race restarted on lap 43, Wilson drafted past Newgarden and took the lead in turn one. Newgarden repassed Wilson entering turn two and continued to hold the lead for the next 12 laps. On lap 55, Tony Kanaan charged to the lead, passing Newgarden on the frontstretch. Kanaan held the lead until greenflag pitstops began on lap 65. After the cycle of stops, Simon Pagenaud assumed the lead Castroneves and Kanaan in close pursuit. On lap 79, Castroneves took the lead on the frontstretch.

On lap 85, Jack Hawksworth made a late move to pass Charlie Kimball in turn one and both cars collided. They made very light contact with the wall and slid down the track locked together, both drivers making angry gestures at each other as the cars slid. Hawksworth retired from the race while Kimball was able to continue on the lead lap. Exiting his pitstall under caution, Will Power spun and dropped to the rear of the field.

On the lap 93 restart, Kanaan passed Castroneves entering turn one. At the completion of the first lap under green, Graham Rahal and Justin Wilson entered turn three side by side. Tristan Vautier made a late move to the inside of Rahal entering the turn and spun Rahal. Rahal and Vautier impacted the turn three wall. An angry Rahal confronted Vautier on track and voiced his displeasure in an interview with NBCSN.

"(Vautier) says I turned in on him, there's not any space. I mean, we're already two-wide, he knows that, he sees that. But he's not known as the sharpest tool around here... As they say, when you're back with the squirrels, you're bound to get your nuts cracked."

When the race restarted on lap 104, Pagenaud took the lead from Kanaan. One lap later, Sage Karam took the lead and led for two laps before pitting under green, returning the lead to Pagenaud who was quickly passed by Castroneves. Debris from the car of Ed Carpenter brought out another caution on lap 109.

On lap 132, Tony Kanaan clipped the apron in turn two and spun out, impacting the inside wall and breaking the left-front suspension. On the restart, Marco Andretti lost control entering turn two, spun, and hit the wall with the right side.

On lap 152, Ryan Hunter-Reay drafted past Sage Karam and Simon Pagenaud to take to lead on the frontstretch. With 37 laps to go, the ninth caution of the day came out when a fox ran from the infield and crossed the race track at the end of the frontstretch before it jumped over the wall.

On the lap 167 restart, Sage Karam in fourth position failed to accelerate with the leaders and created a major traffic jam on the frontstretch. The cars of Karam, Pagenaud, Chaves, Newgarden, Power, Montoya, and Takuma Sato went seven-wide on the frontstretch, with Sato going from the 12th position to 4th by turn one. Helio Castroneves got too high in turn one and spun into the wall, bringing out the tenth caution of the day.

When the race restarted on lap 173, a tightly packed field entered turn one three-wide for the lead, with Newgarden passing Ryan Hunter-Reay and Takuma Sato for the lead. Exiting turn two later that lap, Sato passed Newgarden for the lead.

Most of the leaders made pitstops on lap 164 and needed to conserve fuel to make the finish. Running a conservative fuel strategy, Sato was passed by Karam for the lead with 25 laps to go. A highly competitive race, Karam's pass of Sato broke the event record of 28 lead changes set in 1973.

With 21 laps remaining, Karam lost control and spun from the lead in turn one. He impacted the wall with the left-front. Debris from the accident fell from the air and hit Justin Wilson on the helmet. Wilson, who had been in the thirteenth position, slid unconscious into the inside wall.

Karam's crash gave the lead to fellow rookie, Gabby Chaves, who was looking to become the first rookie to win the Pocono 500 since Danny Sullivan in 1984. The long caution allowed all cars to make the finish on fuel.

After a lengthy clean-up, the race restarted with seven laps remaining. Chaves led the field for the next two laps. Hunter-Reay passed Sato for second entering turn three with six laps remaining. Hunter-Reay then drafted off Chaves on the frontstretch and made a slingshot pass entering turn one on the inside. Chaves was quickly passed by Newgarden and Montoya. Exiting turn two with four laps to go, Chaves suffered engine failure, bringing out the 12th caution of the day, breaking a record for most cautions in the Pocono 500 set in 1988.

Ryan Hunter-Reay led the field under caution for the final three laps and scored the victory. It was the 16th of his IndyCar career and second 500-mile victory, after the 2014 Indianapolis 500. His average speed was 146.245 mph. Josef Newgarden, driving the No. 67 Chevrolet for CFH Racing, finished second and led a race-high 47 laps. Points leader Juan Pablo Montoya finished in third.

With 33 lead changes, it was an event record that remained until 2017. There were 12 caution periods for 74 laps, and the race ended under the yellow flag. Between 2013 and 2019, it was the only Pocono 500 with more than four cautions.

Eleven cars were running at the finish, with each being on the lead lap except for Pippa Mann, whose No. 18 Dale Coyne Racing Honda was running in thirteenth place fifteen laps down.

== Broadcasting ==
NBCSN and the Indianapolis Motor Speedway Radio Network provided coverage of the event on television and radio respectively. Leigh Diffey called the race on television with Steve Matchett and Paul Tracy providing analysis. Matchett – Diffey's colleague from NBCSN's coverage of Formula One – was substituting for Townsend Bell, whose commitments to his United SportsCar Championship team took him to Virginia International Raceway that day where he finished first in his classification at the Oak Tree Grand Prix.

In the United States, the race attracted 635,000 viewers and got a 0.57 TV rating. It was the second most-watched IndyCar race on NBCSN in 2015, behind only the season-finale race at Sonoma.

Paul Page headed the IMS booth with analyst Davey Hamilton, with Mark Jaynes and Jake Query reporting from the track.

== Fatal accident ==
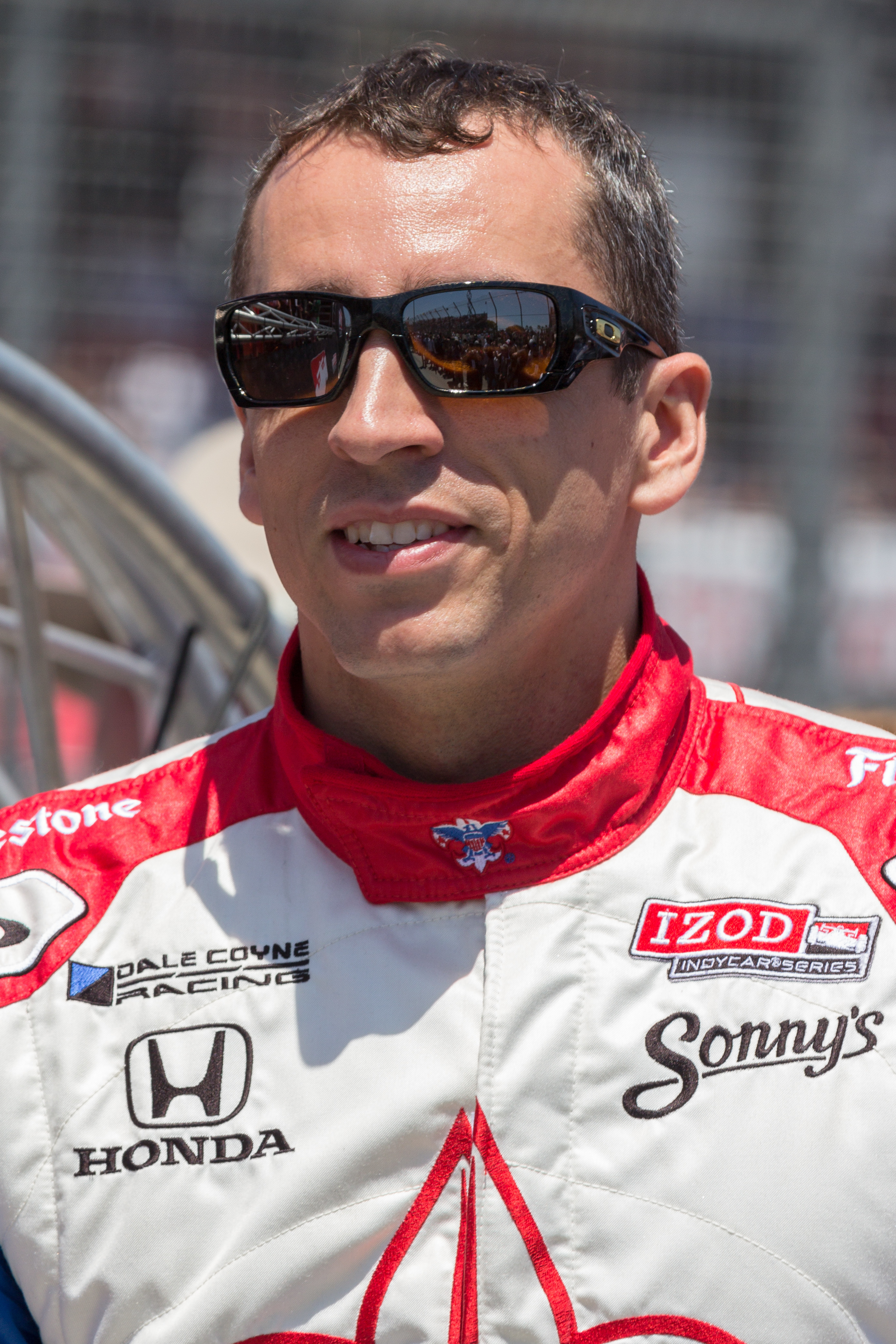
Justin Wilson, who was fatally injured during the race.

On lap 180 of the event, Karam was leading when he lost control of his car in turn one and made contact with the wall. The impact tore away most of the front end of Karam's car and he slid to a stop just past the exit to Turn 1. The nose cone of the Chevrolet came off with such force that it was bouncing along on the track as the drivers drove past. When Wilson, running fourteenth, drove by the scene, Karam's nose cone struck him in the head and knocked him unconscious. Wilson's No. 25 Honda lost control and veered off track, hitting the inner wall just past Turn 1 and continuing to slide up the track.

Karam, though shaken up, was able to exit his car with no major injuries. Wilson, however, was unresponsive when the track safety crew arrived at his machine and he had to be extricated from the car. A medivac helicopter was called for and transported Wilson to Lehigh Valley Hospital–Cedar Crest in nearby Allentown. He was reported to be in a coma with a severe head injury and was listed in critical condition. At approximately 21:00 local time on August 24, 2015, a press conference at Indianapolis Motor Speedway announced that Wilson had died from his injuries at the age of 37.

Wilson was the first IndyCar driver to lose his life since Dan Wheldon's fatal accident at the 2011 IZOD IndyCar World Championship in Las Vegas. His death was the second such occurrence in the world of open-wheel racing in 2015, following the death of Marussia F1 driver Jules Bianchi nine months after suffering a diffuse axonal injury in a crash at the 2014 Japanese Grand Prix.

In response to the crash, IndyCar mandated that all nose cones and rear wings must be tethered to the car on superspeedways beginning in 2016 to prevent flying debris. Additionally, Wilson's crash was considered a significant factor in IndyCar's decision to close their cockpits with an aeroscreen in late-2019.

== Results ==
=== Qualifying ===
Pos	No.	Name	Time	Gap
1	3	(Brazil) Hélio Castroneves	1:21.6217	—
2	22	(France) Simon Pagenaud	1:21.6382	+ 0.0165
3	1	(Australia) Will Power	1:21.6704	+ 0.0487
4	67	(United States) Josef Newgarden	1:21.7659	+ 0.1442
5	15	(United States) Graham Rahal	1:21.7743	+ 0.1526
6	26	(Colombia) Carlos Muñoz	1:21.8809	+ 0.2592
7	25	(United Kingdom) Justin Wilson	1:21.9356	+ 0.3139
8	28	(United States) Ryan Hunter-Reay	1:21.9402	+ 0.3185
9	14	(Japan) Takuma Sato	1:21.9755	+ 0.3538
10	11	(France) Sébastien Bourdais	1:21.9968	+ 0.3751
11	9	(New Zealand) Scott Dixon	1:22.2035	+ 0.5818
12	10	(Brazil) Tony Kanaan	1:22.2610	+ 0.6393
13	19	(France) Tristan Vautier	1:22.3435	+ 0.7218
14	41	(United Kingdom) Jack Hawksworth	1:22.4437	+ 0.8220
15	7	(United Kingdom) James Jakes	1:22.4757	+ 0.8540
16	98	(Colombia) Gabby Chaves	1:22.5111	+ 0.8894
17	18	(United Kingdom) Pippa Mann	1:22.8075	+ 1.1858
18	5	(Australia) Ryan Briscoe	1:22.8571	+ 1.2354
19	2	(Colombia) Juan Pablo Montoya	1:22.8751	+ 1.2534
20	8	(United States) Sage Karam	1:23.1791	+ 1.5574
21	20	(United States) Ed Carpenter	1:23.2120	+ 1.5903
22	27	(United States) Marco Andretti	1:23.6816	+ 2.0599
23	83	(United States) Charlie Kimball	No time	—
24	4	(Monaco) Stefano Coletti	No time	—
Qualifications

=== Race ===
Pos	No.	Driver	Team	Engine & Aero Kit	Laps	Time/Retired	Pit Stops	Grid	Laps Led	Pts.
1	28	(United States) Ryan Hunter-Reay	Andretti Autosport	Honda	200	3:25:08.1095; 146.245 mph	6	8	29	51
2	67	(United States) Josef Newgarden	CFH Racing	Chevrolet	200	+0.3157	8	4	47	43
3	2	(Colombia) Juan Pablo Montoya W	Team Penske	Chevrolet	200	+0.5696	7	19		35
4	1	(Australia) Will Power	Team Penske	Chevrolet	200	+1.4707	10	3	2	33
5	26	(Colombia) Carlos Muñoz	Andretti Autosport	Honda	200	+2.0003	8	6		30
6	14	(Japan) Takuma Sato	A. J. Foyt Enterprises	Honda	200	+3.5167	11	9	3	29
7	22	(France) Simon Pagenaud	Team Penske	Chevrolet	200	+4.5025	7	2	30	27
8	5	(Australia) Ryan Briscoe	Schmidt Peterson Motorsports	Honda	200	+4.7997	7	18	3	25
9	9	(New Zealand) Scott Dixon W	Chip Ganassi Racing	Chevrolet	200	+5.6857	8	11		22
10	7	(United Kingdom) James Jakes	Schmidt Peterson Motorsports	Honda	200	+6.2994	10	15		20
11	98	(Colombia) Gabby Chaves R	Bryan Herta Autosport	Honda	197	Engine	5	16	31	20
12	83	(United States) Charlie Kimball	Chip Ganassi Racing	Chevrolet	193	Handling	13	23	1	19
13	18	(United Kingdom) Pippa Mann	Dale Coyne Racing	Honda	185	+15 Laps	12	17		17
14	8	(United States) Sage Karam R	Chip Ganassi Racing	Chevrolet	179	Crash T1	6	20	7	17
15	25	(United Kingdom) Justin Wilson	Andretti Autosport	Honda	179	Fatal Crash T1	8	7	2	16
16	3	(Brazil) Hélio Castroneves	Team Penske	Chevrolet	166	Crash T1	7	1	24	16
17	20	(United States) Ed Carpenter	CFH Racing	Chevrolet	156	Engine	7	21		13
18	27	(United States) Marco Andretti	Andretti Autosport	Honda	138	Crash T2	5	22		12
19	10	(Brazil) Tony Kanaan	Chip Ganassi Racing	Chevrolet	131	Crash T2	4	12	21	12
20	15	(United States) Graham Rahal	Rahal Letterman Lanigan Racing	Honda	92	Crash T3	3	5		10
21	19	(France) Tristan Vautier	Dale Coyne Racing	Honda	92	Crash T3	6	13		9
22	41	(United Kingdom) Jack Hawksworth	A. J. Foyt Enterprises	Honda	82	Crash T1	4	14		8
23	11	(France) Sébastien Bourdais	KV Racing Technology	Chevrolet	36	Crash T2	1	10		7
24	4	(Monaco) Stefano Coletti R	KV Racing Technology	Chevrolet	19	Brakes		24		6
OFFICIAL BOX SCORE

Key	Meaning
R	Rookie
W	Past winner

Previous race: 2015 Honda Indy 200	IndyCar Series; 2015 season	Next race: 2015 GoPro Grand Prix of Sonoma
Previous race: 2014 Pocono IndyCar 500	ABC Supply 500	Next race: 2016 ABC Supply 500
