= 2015 Iowa Corn Indy 300 =

Indycar race held in Newton, Iowa

(United States) 2015 Iowa Corn 300
Race details
13th round of the 2015 IndyCar season
← Previous race	Next race →
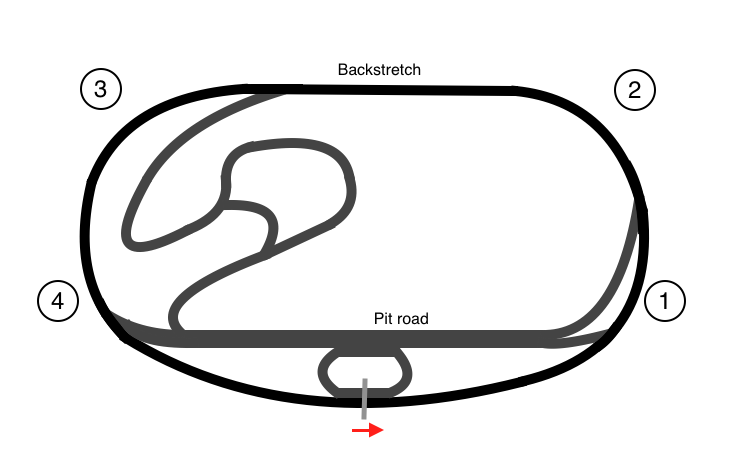
- Date: July 18, 2015
- Official name: Iowa Corn 300
- Location: Iowa Speedway
- Course: Permanent racing facility 0.875 mi / 1.400 km
- Distance: 300 laps 268.2 mi / 431.63 km

Pole position
- Driver: (Brazil) Hélio Castroneves (Team Penske)
- Time: 35.0817

Fastest lap
- Driver: (New Zealand) Scott Dixon (Chip Ganassi Racing)
- Time: 18.1748 (on lap 191 of 300)

Podium
- First: (United States) Ryan Hunter-Reay (Andretti Autosport)
- Second: (United States) Josef Newgarden (CFH Racing)
- Third: (United States) Sage Karam (Chip Ganassi Racing)

Chronology
Previous	Next
2014	2016

The 2015 Iowa Corn 300 was the thirteenth round of the 2015 IndyCar season. The race was held on July 18, 2015, the ninth consecutive year the Verizon IndyCar Series visited the Newton, Iowa short oval. 2014 race winner and series champion Ryan Hunter-Reay shook off the frustrations of his 2015 season for his first win and first podium finish of the season, Andretti Autosport's sixth consecutive win at Iowa.

== Race summary ==
Hélio Castroneves picked up his 3rd pole at Iowa. The start was waved off when Hélio Castroneves jumped his country mate and friend Tony Kanaan. The first caution waved on lap 10 when Championship leader Juan Pablo Montoya crashed in turn 2. The second caution came on lap 25 when Charlie Kimball and Stefano Coletti got together in turn 3. The third caution waved on lap 108 when Justin Wilson got up high in turn 2, eventually cutting a tire down. The fourth caution came out on lap 172 when Charlie Kimball crashed in turn 2. The fifth caution came on lap 195 when Stefano Coletti crashed in turn 2. The sixth and final caution waved on lap 262 when Takuma Sato hit the wall in turn 2. Ryan Hunter-Reay held off Josef Newgarden and Sage Karam to pick up his first win of the season. Ed Carpenter got out of his car after the race and confronted the 20 year old rookie driver from Nazareth Pennsylvania Sage Karam.

== Qualifying ==
Qualifying was held on the morning of race day, July 18, 2015.

Pos	No.	Driver	Team	Engine	Time	Final grid
1	3	(Brazil) Hélio Castroneves	Team Penske	Chevrolet	35.0817	1
2	10	(Brazil) Tony Kanaan W	Chip Ganassi Racing	Chevrolet	35.1497	2
3	2	(Colombia) Juan Pablo Montoya	Team Penske	Chevrolet	35.2302	3
4	9	(New Zealand) Scott Dixon	Chip Ganassi Racing	Chevrolet	35.2978	4
5	22	(France) Simon Pagenaud	Team Penske	Chevrolet	35.4397	5
6	1	(Australia) Will Power	Team Penske	Chevrolet	35.4400	6
7	67	(United States) Josef Newgarden	CFH Racing	Chevrolet	35.4905	7
8	27	(United States) Marco Andretti W	Andretti Autosport	Honda	35.5465	8
9	28	(United States) Ryan Hunter-Reay W	Andretti Autosport	Honda	35.5934	9
10	8	(United States) Sage Karam R	Chip Ganassi Racing	Chevrolet	35.6296	10
11	20	(United States) Ed Carpenter	CFH Racing	Chevrolet	35.6806	11
12	26	(Colombia) Carlos Muñoz	Andretti Autosport	Honda	35.7442	12
13	4	(Monaco) Stefano Coletti R	KV Racing Technology	Chevrolet	35.7803	13
14	7	(United Kingdom) James Jakes	Schmidt Peterson Motorsports	Honda	35.9603	14
15	14	(Japan) Takuma Sato	A. J. Foyt Racing	Honda	36.0740	15
16	83	(United States) Charlie Kimball	Chip Ganassi Racing	Chevrolet	36.1674	16
17	15	(United States) Graham Rahal	Rahal Letterman Lanigan Racing	Honda	36.1909	17
18	25	(United Kingdom) Justin Wilson	Andretti Autosport	Honda	36.1975	18
19	5	(Australia) Ryan Briscoe	Schmidt Peterson Motorsports	Honda	36.3852	19
20	19	(France) Tristan Vautier	Dale Coyne Racing	Honda	36.5196	20
21	41	(United Kingdom) Jack Hawksworth	A. J. Foyt Racing	Honda	36.5199	21
22	18	(United Kingdom) Pippa Mann	Dale Coyne Racing	Honda	36.6118	22
23	98	(Colombia) Gabby Chaves R	Bryan Herta Autosport	Honda	36.6419	23
24	11	(France) Sébastien Bourdais	KVSH Racing	Chevrolet	No Time	24
Official results

== Race ==
The race was held on July 18, 2015. Ryan Hunter-Reay won over Josef Newgarden and Sage Karam for an all-American podium.

Pos	No.	Driver	Team	Engine	Laps	Time/Retired	Pit Stops	Grid	Laps Led	Pts.
1	28	(United States) Ryan Hunter-Reay W	Andretti Autosport	Honda	300	2:03:50.3315	4	9	37	51
2	67	(United States) Josef Newgarden	CFH Racing	Chevrolet	300	+0.5046	4	7	111	43
3	8	(United States) Sage Karam R	Chip Ganassi Racing	Chevrolet	300	+2.8451	4	10	–	35
4	15	(United States) Graham Rahal	Rahal Letterman Lanigan Racing	Honda	300	+4.6579	5	17	7	33
5	26	(Colombia) Carlos Muñoz	Andretti Autosport	Honda	300	+6.8921	4	12	–	30
6	20	(United States) Ed Carpenter	CFH Racing	Chevrolet	300	+7.4884	4	11	–	28
7	27	(United States) Marco Andretti	Andretti Autosport	Honda	300	+8.4296	5	8	–	26
8	5	(Australia) Ryan Briscoe	Schmidt Peterson Motorsports	Honda	300	+10.5332	5	19	–	24
9	11	(France) Sébastien Bourdais	KVSH Racing	Chevrolet	300	+11.8013	7	24	6	23
10	1	(Australia) Will Power	Team Penske	Chevrolet	300	+12.1472	4	6	2	21
11	3	(Brazil) Hélio Castroneves	Team Penske	Chevrolet	300	+13.2151	5	1	50	21
12	19	(France) Tristan Vautier	Dale Coyne Racing	Honda	299	+1 Lap	4	20	–	18
13	41	(United Kingdom) Jack Hawksworth	A. J. Foyt Racing	Honda	299	+1 Lap	6	21	7	18
14	22	(France) Simon Pagenaud	Team Penske	Chevrolet	299	+1 Lap	4	5	-	16
15	7	(United Kingdom) James Jakes	Schmidt Peterson Motorsports	Honda	299	+1 Lap	7	14	3	16
16	98	(Colombia) Gabby Chaves R	Bryan Herta Autosport	Honda	299	+1 Lap	7	23	–	14
17	25	(United Kingdom) Justin Wilson	Andretti Autosport	Honda	297	+3 Laps	6	18	–	13
18	9	(New Zealand) Scott Dixon	Chip Ganassi Racing	Chevrolet	263	+37 Laps	4	4	-	12
19	14	(Japan) Takuma Sato	A. J. Foyt Racing	Honda	260	Contact	4	15	-	11
20	4	(Monaco) Stefano Coletti R	KV Racing Technology	Chevrolet	191	Contact	6	13	–	10
21	10	(Brazil) Tony Kanaan W	Chip Ganassi Racing	Chevrolet	189	Mechanical	3	2	70	10
22	83	(United States) Charlie Kimball	Chip Ganassi Racing	Chevrolet	170	Contact	2	16	7	9
23	18	(United Kingdom) Pippa Mann	Dale Coyne Racing	Honda	136	Handling	2	22	–	7
24	2	(Colombia) Juan Pablo Montoya	Team Penske	Chevrolet	9	Contact	0	3	–	6
Fastest lap: (New Zealand) Scott Dixon (Chip Ganassi Racing) – 18.1748 (Lap 191)
Official results

Previous race: 2015 ABC Supply Wisconsin 250	IndyCar Series; 2015 season	Next race: 2015 Honda Indy 200
Previous race: 2014 Iowa Corn 300	Iowa Corn 300	Next race: 2016 Iowa Corn 300
