= 2015 Honda Indy 200 =

(United States) 2015 Mid-Ohio
Race details
14th round of the 2015 IndyCar Series season
← Previous race	Next race →
- Date: August 2, 2015
- Official name: Honda Indy 200
- Location: Mid-Ohio Sports Car Course
- Course: Permanent racing facility 2.258 mi / 3.634 km
- Distance: 90 laps 203.2 mi / 327.02 km

Pole position
- Driver: (New Zealand) Scott Dixon (Chip Ganassi Racing)
- Time: 1:04.5814

Fastest lap
- Driver: (Australia) Will Power (Team Penske)
- Time: 1:06.3487 (on lap 41 of 90)

Podium
- First: (United States) Graham Rahal (Rahal Letterman Lanigan Racing)
- Second: (United Kingdom) Justin Wilson (Andretti Autosport)
- Third: (France) Simon Pagenaud (Team Penske)

The 2015 Honda Indy 200 was the 14th round of the 2015 IndyCar Series. The event took place July 31-August 2, 2015 and was held at the Mid-Ohio Sports Car Course in Lexington, Ohio. It was the ninth time the course had been used since returning to the IndyCar Series schedule in 2007. 2014 race winner Scott Dixon won the pole position for the second time that season, along with his first-place starting spot for the Indy 500. Ohio native Graham Rahal won the race, his second victory of the season and first at his family's home track after his father, Bobby Rahal, had won twice at Mid-Ohio in 1985 and 1986. It was also the first win at the track for the Rahal Letterman Lanigan Racing team, headquartered in Hilliard, Ohio.

The win brought Rahal within nine points of championship leader Juan Pablo Montoya, with 456 points to Montoya's 465 on the year. After the race, Rahal said "This is a special day for my team and for Honda. Honestly, [even] if I'd won a lot of races in my career – but I never won this one – I think I'd be pretty disappointed. To win this one, you have no idea what it means to our family. For the Rahals, this track has been pretty special to us for so, so many years."

== Report ==
Key	Meaning
R	Rookie
W	Past winner

=== Qualifying ===
Pos	No.	Name	Grp.	Round 1	Round 2	Round 3
1	9	(New Zealand) Scott Dixon W	2	1:04.8950	1:04.7780	1:04.5814
2	1	(Australia) Will Power	1	1:05.6176	1:04.8814	1:04.6782
3	11	(France) Sébastien Bourdais	1	1:05.3377	1:04.9267	1:04.9965
4	3	(Brazil) Hélio Castroneves W	2	1:05.4958	1:04.9796	1:05.0625
5	67	(United States) Josef Newgarden	1	1:05.5624	1:04.9416	1:05.0728
6	83	(United States) Charlie Kimball W	2	1:05.1653	1:04.7637	1:05.0784
7	28	(United States) Ryan Hunter-Reay	2	1:05.4280	1:05.0455	
8	10	(Brazil) Tony Kanaan	1	1:05.6483	1:05.0647	
9	20	(Italy) Luca Filippi	1	1:05.4519	1:05.1616	
10	2	(Colombia) Juan Pablo Montoya W	2	1:05.4062	1:05.2081	
11	41	(United Kingdom) Jack Hawksworth	2	1:05.5340	1:05.2291	
12	27	(United States) Marco Andretti	1	1:05.8398	1:05.3931	
13	15	(United States) Graham Rahal	1	1:05.9650		
14	25	(United Kingdom) Justin Wilson	2	1:05.5886		
15	22	(France) Simon Pagenaud	1	1:05.9877		
16	14	(Japan) Takuma Sato	2	1:05.5933		
17	7	(United Kingdom) James Jakes	1	1:06.0671		
18	4	(Monaco) Stefano Coletti R	2	1:05.6204		
19	8	(United States) Sage Karam R	1	1:06.0688		
20	5	(Australia) Ryan Briscoe W	2	1:05.7053		
21	98	(Colombia) Gabby Chaves R	1	1:06.2195		
22	18	(Venezuela) Rodolfo González R	2	1:05.9698		
23	26	(Colombia) Carlos Muñoz	1	1:06.9891		
24	18	(France) Tristan Vautier	2	1:06.0814		
OFFICIAL RESULTS

=== Race results ===
Pos	No.	Driver	Team	Engine	Laps	Time/Retired	Pit Stops	Grid	Laps Led	Pts.^{1}
1	15	(United States) Graham Rahal	Rahal Letterman Lanigan Racing	Honda	90	1:55:20.0864	3	13	23	53
2	25	(United Kingdom) Justin Wilson	Andretti Autosport	Honda	90	+3.4049	3	14	6	41
3	22	(France) Simon Pagenaud	Team Penske	Chevrolet	90	+4.5706	3	15		35
4	9	(New Zealand) Scott Dixon W	Chip Ganassi Racing	Chevrolet	90	+5.0293	3	1	22	34
5	10	(Brazil) Tony Kanaan	Chip Ganassi Racing	Chevrolet	90	+10.5943	3	8		30
6	19	(France) Tristan Vautier	Dale Coyne Racing	Honda	90	+11.4414	4	24	10	29
7	28	(United States) Ryan Hunter-Reay	Andretti Autosport	Honda	90	+13.8958	3	7		26
8	41	(United Kingdom) Jack Hawksworth	A. J. Foyt Racing	Honda	90	+15.0372	3	11		24
9	26	(Colombia) Carlos Muñoz	Andretti Autosport	Honda	90	+15.6116	4	23		22
10	27	(United States) Marco Andretti	Andretti Autosport	Honda	90	+16.0094	3	12		20
11	2	(Colombia) Juan Pablo Montoya W	Team Penske	Chevrolet	90	+16.1321	3	10	21	20
12	98	(Colombia) Gabby Chaves R	Bryan Herta Autosport	Honda	90	+16.4962	4	21		18
13	67	(United States) Josef Newgarden	CFH Racing	Chevrolet	90	+18.0350	3	5	2	18
14	1	(Australia) Will Power	Team Penske	Chevrolet	90	+18.4290	3	2		16
15	3	(Brazil) Hélio Castroneves W	Team Penske	Chevrolet	90	+19.1285	3	4	6	16
16	7	(United Kingdom) James Jakes	Schmidt Peterson Motorsports	Honda	90	+20.1010	3	17		14
17	11	(France) Sébastien Bourdais	KVSH Racing	Chevrolet	90	+20.5091	3	3		13
18	5	(Australia) Ryan Briscoe W	Schmidt Peterson Motorsports	Honda	90	+20.8331	3	20		12
19	4	(Monaco) Stefano Coletti R	KV Racing Technology	Chevrolet	90	+21.5426	6	18		11
20	18	(Venezuela) Rodolfo González R	Dale Coyne Racing	Honda	90	+24.9667	4	22		10
21	20	(Italy) Luca Filippi	CFH Racing	Chevrolet	89	Off Course	3	9		9
22	8	(United States) Sage Karam R	Chip Ganassi Racing	Chevrolet	89	+1 Lap	5	19		8
23	83	(United States) Charlie Kimball W	Chip Ganassi Racing	Chevrolet	87	+3 Laps	5	6		7
24	14	(Japan) Takuma Sato	A. J. Foyt Racing	Honda	60	Contact	3	16		6
Fastest lap: (Australia) Will Power (Team Penske) – 1:06.3487 (Lap 41)
OFFICIAL BOX SCORE

Notes

^{1} Points include 1 point for leading at least 1 lap during a race, an additional 2 points for leading the most race laps, and 1 point for Pole Position.

== Championship standings after the race ==
Drivers' Championship standings

	Pos.	Driver	Points
Unchanged	1	(Colombia) Juan Pablo Montoya	465
Unchanged	2	(United States) Graham Rahal	456 (-9)
Unchanged	3	(New Zealand) Scott Dixon	431 (-34)
Unchanged	4	(Brazil) Hélio Castroneves	407 (-58)
Unchanged	5	(Australia) Will Power	406 (-59)

Engine manufacturer standings

	Pos.	Manufacturer	Points
Unchanged	1	Chevrolet	1209
Unchanged	2	Honda	1029

- Note: Only the top five positions are included.

Previous race: 2015 Iowa Corn Indy 300	IndyCar Series; 2015 season	Next race: 2015 ABC Supply 500
Previous race: 2014 Honda Indy 200	Honda Indy 200	Next race: 2016 Honda Indy 200
