= 2015 Honda Indy Toronto =

(Canada) 2015 Honda Indy Toronto
Race details
10th round of the 2015 IndyCar Series season
| ← Previous race | Next race → |
- Date: June 14, 2015
- Official name: Honda Indy Toronto
- Location: Exhibition Place
- Course: Temporary road course 1.755 mi / 2.824 km
- Distance: 85 laps 149.175 mi / 240.04 km
- Weather: Wet with temperatures reaching up to 22.3 °C (72.1 °F); dropping to 17.8 °C (64.0 °F) by the end of the event

Pole position
- Driver: (Australia) Will Power (Team Penske)
- Time: 59.4280

Fastest lap
- Driver: (Brazil) Hélio Castroneves (Team Penske)
- Time: 1:00.0651 (on lap 65 of 85)

Podium
- First: (United States) Josef Newgarden (CFH Racing)
- Second: (Italy) Luca Filippi (CFH Racing)
- Third: (Brazil) Hélio Castroneves (Team Penske)

The 2015 Honda Indy Toronto was an open-wheel motorsport event held at Exhibition Place in Toronto, Ontario, Canada over June 12–14, 2015. The event marked the 29th annual edition of the Toronto Indy, and the tenth round of the 2015 IndyCar Series season. The headline race on the Sunday was the 31st IndyCar race to be held at the 1.755-mile (2.824 km) street circuit.

Josef Newgarden led home teammate Luca Filippi for a CFH Racing 1–2 finish, with the podium completed by Team Penske driver Hélio Castroneves. Championship leader Juan Pablo Montoya finished seventh, but his championship lead was reduced to twenty-seven by his Penske teammate Will Power, who finished fourth.

== Race background ==
Due to Toronto hosting the 2015 Pan American and Parapan American Games, the race – held traditionally in mid-July – was moved to June to avoid conflicting with the games. Exhibition Place was unavailable in July and August as it was to be converted into Pan Am Park, in order to host various games events including beach volleyball, gymnastics and cycling.

Honda Indy Toronto organizers had begun discussions with Canadian Tire Motorsport Park about moving the IndyCar race to its permanent motorsports facility located north of Bowmanville, Ontario for one year in the event that a replacement date at Exhibition Place could not be found. It would have been the first IndyCar race to have been held at the venue formerly known as Mosport since the 1978 Molson Diamond Indy, won by Danny Ongais.

An agreement was eventually made to host the race in June following the cancellation of the Grand Prix of Houston, with the Toronto Indy set to return to July for 2016.

The weekend also included races for Indy Lights, the Pro Mazda Championship, the U.S. F2000 National Championship, SPEED Energy Formula Off-Road Super Trucks, IMSA GT3 Cup Challenge Canada and the Canadian Touring Car Championship.

== Report ==
=== Free practice ===
Two practice sessions were held on Friday June 12, with Juan Pablo Montoya posting the fastest time in both practice sessions. An additional practice session was held the next morning with Hélio Castroneves posting the best time.

=== Qualifying ===
23 cars entered for qualifications for the race. The format was for "shootout" qualification rounds later on Saturday afternoon to determine pole position and the starting positions for the rest of the field. Will Power secured the pole position with teammates Simon Pagenaud and Montoya landing the second and third positions for Team Penske, with Scott Dixon taking fourth position, completing the second row for Chip Ganassi Racing.

| Pos | No. | Name | Grp. | Round 1 | Round 2 | Round 3 |
|---|---|---|---|---|---|---|
| 1 | 1 | (Australia) Will Power W | 1 | 0:59.9492 | 0:59.8077 | 0:59.4280 |
| 2 | 22 | (France) Simon Pagenaud | 1 | 0:59.6180 | 0:59.7414 | 0:59.6095 |
| 3 | 2 | (Colombia) Juan Pablo Montoya | 1 | 0:59.8253 | 0:59.4137 | 0:59.6242 |
| 4 | 9 | (New Zealand) Scott Dixon W | 2 | 1:00.8694 | 0:59.8478 | 0:59.8879 |
| 5 | 11 | (France) Sébastien Bourdais W | 1 | 1:00.2929 | 0:59.8427 | 0:59.9012 |
| 6 | 20 | (Italy) Luca Filippi | 1 | 1:00.3469 | 0:59.8922 | 1:00.2312 |
| 7 | 3 | (Brazil) Hélio Castroneves | 2 | 1:01.2514 | 0:59.8940 | |
| 8 | 14 | (Japan) Takuma Sato | 2 | 1:01.0631 | 0:59.9500 | |
| 9 | 10 | (Brazil) Tony Kanaan | 2 | 1:00.5227 | 1:00.0901 | |
| 10 | 15 | (United States) Graham Rahal | 2 | 1:01.0274 | 1:00.1241 | |
| 11 | 67 | (United States) Josef Newgarden | 2 | 1:01.3474 | 1:00.1323 | |
| 12 | 7 | (United Kingdom) James Jakes | 1 | 1:00.3686 | 1:00.4576 | |
| 13 | 26 | (Colombia) Carlos Muñoz | 1 | 1:00.6849 | | |
| 14 | 41 | (United Kingdom) Jack Hawksworth | 2 | 1:01.4569 | | |
| 15 | 83 | (United States) Charlie Kimball | 1 | 1:00.8553 | | |
| 16 | 28 | (United States) Ryan Hunter-Reay W | 2 | 1:01.5959 | | |
| 17 | 8 | (Colombia) Sebastián Saavedra | 1 | 1:00.9926 | | |
| 18 | 27 | (United States) Marco Andretti | 2 | 1:01.9907 | | |
| 19 | 5 | (United States) Conor Daly R | 1 | 1:01.2543 | | |
| 20 | 4 | (Monaco) Stefano Coletti R | 2 | 1:02.4000 | | |
| 21 | 19 | (France) Tristan Vautier | 1 | 1:01.5065 | | |
| 22 | 98 | (Colombia) Gabby Chaves R | 2 | 1:02.4016 | | |
| 23 | 18 | (Venezuela) Rodolfo González R | 2 | 1:05.0167 | | |
Qualifications

=== Race summary ===
At the start of the race, the track was still wet from a large thunderstorm which had moved through the area just before the start. As a result, all the cars started out on wet tires. Pole driver Will Power held the lead for the first 30 laps, with Simon Pagenaud trying to overtake him several times, until he pitted under the first of the race's two full course cautions, which came out due to James Jakes having minor contact and stalling at Turn 5. As Power pitted, the lead passed on to Penske teammate Hélio Castroneves. Castroneves held the lead until the second full course caution, when debris from Stefano Coletti's car was left on circuit at Turn 8. Josef Newgarden took the lead before it passed to CFH Racing teammate Luca Filippi on lap 58, before Tony Kanaan took the lead on lap 60. Three laps later, Castroneves re-took the lead which he held for four laps. After pitting, the lead fell to rookie Rodolfo González who held the lead for five laps as Newgarden and Filippi battled for second position. Gonzalez was ultimately forced to pit for fuel which handed the lead back to Newgarden. Newgarden held the lead until the checkered flag, to take his second victory of 2015. Filippi followed him home in second, to record CFH Racing's first 1–2 finish, with Castroneves taking third for Team Penske.

=== Race results ===
| Pos | No. | Driver | Team | Engine & Aero Kit | Laps | Time/Retired | Pit Stops | Grid | Laps Led | Pts. |
|---|---|---|---|---|---|---|---|---|---|---|
| 1 | 67 | (United States) Josef Newgarden | CFH Racing | Chevrolet | 85 | 1:38:59.9460 | 3 | 11 | 30 | 53 |
| 2 | 20 | (Italy) Luca Filippi | CFH Racing | Chevrolet | 85 | +1.4485 | 3 | 6 | 2 | 41 |
| 3 | 3 | (Brazil) Hélio Castroneves | Team Penske | Chevrolet | 85 | +3.9027 | 3 | 7 | 15 | 36 |
| 4 | 1 | (Australia) Will Power W | Team Penske | Chevrolet | 85 | +4.7766 | 3 | 1 | 30 | 34 |
| 5 | 11 | (France) Sébastien Bourdais W | KV Racing Technology | Chevrolet | 85 | +6.7215 | 3 | 5 | | 30 |
| 6 | 10 | (Brazil) Tony Kanaan | Chip Ganassi Racing | Chevrolet | 85 | +7.8160 | 3 | 9 | 3 | 29 |
| 7 | 2 | (Colombia) Juan Pablo Montoya | Team Penske | Chevrolet | 85 | +8.7242 | 3 | 3 | | 26 |
| 8 | 9 | (New Zealand) Scott Dixon W | Chip Ganassi Racing | Chevrolet | 85 | +9.5397 | 3 | 4 | | 24 |
| 9 | 15 | (United States) Graham Rahal | Rahal Letterman Lanigan Racing | Honda | 85 | +11.8704 | 3 | 10 | | 22 |
| 10 | 14 | (Japan) Takuma Sato | A. J. Foyt Enterprises | Honda | 85 | +18.9723 | 3 | 8 | | 20 |
| 11 | 22 | (France) Simon Pagenaud | Team Penske | Chevrolet | 85 | +20.6315 | 3 | 2 | | 19 |
| 12 | 5 | (United States) Conor Daly R | Schmidt Peterson Motorsports | Honda | 85 | +21.9187 | 3 | 19 | | 18 |
| 13 | 27 | (United States) Marco Andretti | Andretti Autosport | Honda | 85 | +33.2063 | 3 | 18 | | 17 |
| 14 | 41 | (United Kingdom) Jack Hawksworth | A. J. Foyt Enterprises | Honda | 85 | +44.5250 | 3 | 14 | | 16 |
| 15 | 98 | (Colombia) Gabby Chaves R | Bryan Herta Autosport | Honda | 85 | +46.0971 | 3 | 22 | | 15 |
| 16 | 8 | (Colombia) Sebastián Saavedra | Chip Ganassi Racing | Chevrolet | 85 | +46.6248 | 4 | 17 | | 14 |
| 17 | 19 | (France) Tristan Vautier | Dale Coyne Racing | Honda | 85 | +47.0229 | 3 | 21 | | 13 |
| 18 | 18 | (Venezuela) Rodolfo González R | Dale Coyne Racing | Honda | 85 | +51.3658 | 3 | 23 | 5 | 13 |
| 19 | 28 | (United States) Ryan Hunter-Reay W | Andretti Autosport | Honda | 84 | Mechanical | 3 | 16 | | 11 |
| 20 | 83 | (United States) Charlie Kimball | Chip Ganassi Racing | Chevrolet | 84 | +1 Lap | 7 | 15 | | 10 |
| 21 | 7 | (United Kingdom) James Jakes | Schmidt Peterson Motorsports | Honda | 84 | +1 Lap | 5 | 12 | | 9 |
| 22 | 26 | (Colombia) Carlos Muñoz | Andretti Autosport | Honda | 69 | Mechanical | 3 | 13 | | 8 |
| 23 | 4 | (Monaco) Stefano Coletti R | KV Racing Technology | Chevrolet | 40 | Contact | 2 | 20 | | 7 |
OFFICIAL BOX SCORE

| Key | Meaning |
|---|---|
| R | Rookie |
| W | Past winner |

== Championship standings after the race ==
Drivers' standings

| Pos | Driver | Points |
| 1 | (Colombia) Juan Pablo Montoya | 374 |
| 2 | (Australia) Will Power | 347 |
| 3 | (New Zealand) Scott Dixon W | 329 |
| 4 | (Brazil) Hélio Castroneves | 322 |
| 5 | (United States) Graham Rahal | 283 |

Manufacturer standings

| Pos | Manufacturer | Points |
| 1 | (United States) Chevrolet | 1,003 |
| 2 | (Japan) Honda | 840 |

- Note: Only the top five positions are included.

== Media ==
=== Television ===
The race was broadcast live by NBCSN in the United States and by Sportsnet on City and Sportsnet One in Canada. The event was also televised internationally by ESPN's ESPN Player across Europe, the Middle East and Africa.

IndyCar Series on NBC
| Booth Announcers | | Pit reporters |
|---|---|---|
| Announcer | Leigh Diffey | Jon Beekhuis; Robin Miller; Kevin Lee; Katie Hargitt |
| Color | Steve Matchett; Paul Tracy | Jon Beekhuis; Robin Miller; Kevin Lee; Katie Hargitt |

IndyCar on Sportsnet
| Hosts | Pit reporters |
|---|---|
| Brad Fay; Bill Adam | Todd Lewis |

=== Radio ===
The race was broadcast on radio by the IndyCar Radio Network and simulcast on Sirius / XM satellite radio and IndyCar.com.

IndyCar Radio Network
| Booth Announcers | | Turn Reporters | | Pit reporters |
|---|---|---|---|---|
| Chief announcer | Paul Page | Turn 3 | Mark Jaynes | Nick Yeoman; Rob Howden |
| Driver expert | Zach Veach | Turn 4 | Jake Query | Nick Yeoman; Rob Howden |

== Support race results ==
| | Indy Lights | Pro Mazda | U.S. F2000 | Super Trucks | GT3 Cup Canada | CTCC |
|---|---|---|---|---|---|---|
| Race 1 | (United States) Spencer Pigot | (France) Florian Latorre | (United States) Jake Eidson | (United States) Scotty Steele | (Canada) Scott Hargrove | (Canada) Pascal Carré |
| Race 2 | (United States) Spencer Pigot | (Canada) Garett Grist | (France) Nico Jamin | (United States) Keegan Kincaid | (Canada) Daniel Morad | (Canada) Lee Chaplin |

| Previous race: 2015 Firestone 600 | IndyCar Series; 2015 season | Next race: 2015 MAVTV 500 |
| Previous race: 2014 Honda Indy Toronto | Honda Indy Toronto | Next race: 2016 Honda Indy Toronto |
