= Ryan Hunter-Reay =

American racing driver (born 1980)

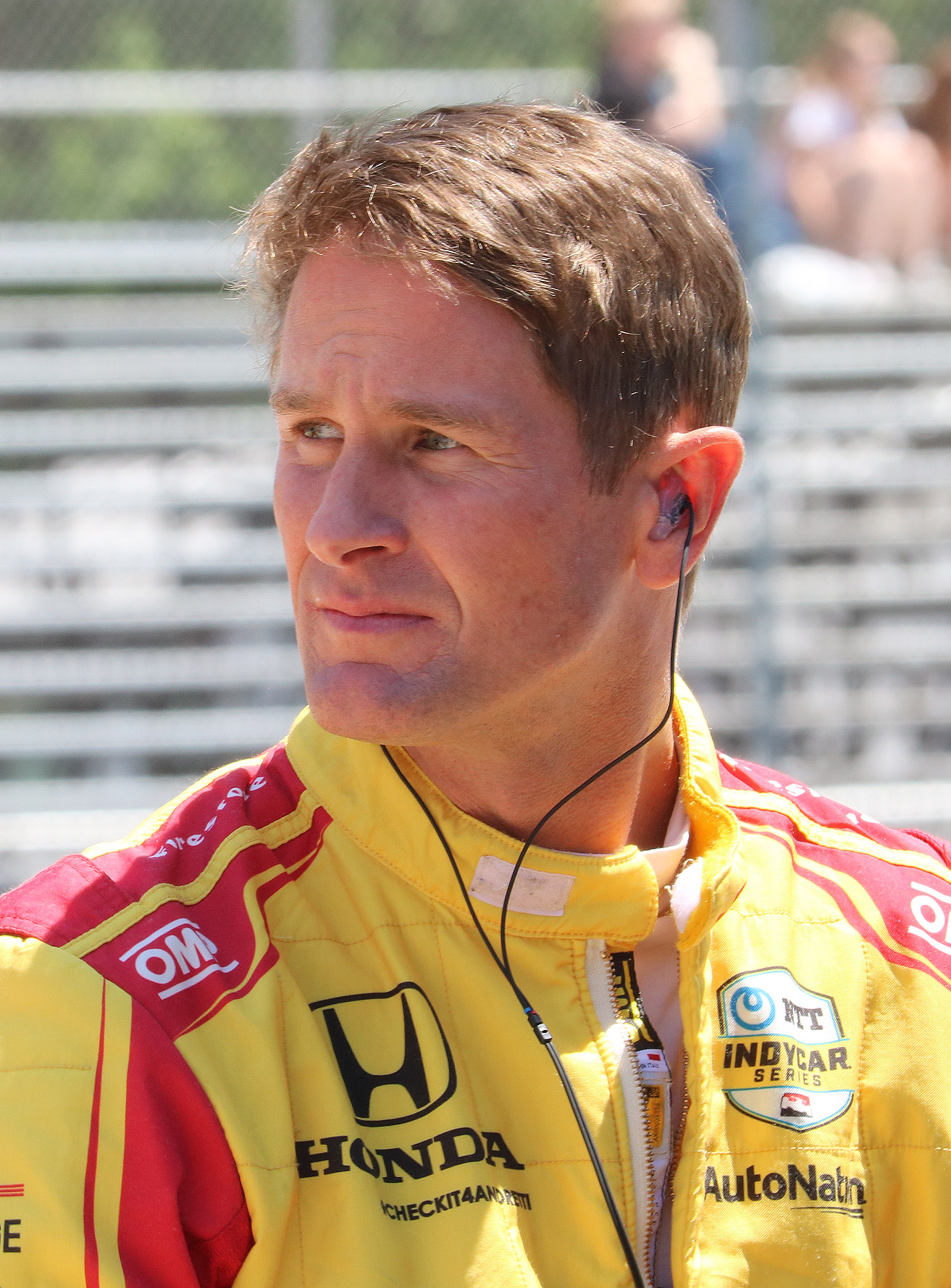
- Hunter-Reay at Road America in 2021
- Nationality: (United States) American
- Born: December 17, 1980 (age 45) Dallas, Texas, U.S.
- Categorisation: FIA Platinum

Championship titles
- 1999 2012 2012 2014: Skip Barber National; IZOD IndyCar Series; IndyCar Series Oval Trophy; Indianapolis 500

Awards
- 1997 2000 2002 2007 2008 2013, 2014: Skip Barber Big Scholarship; Barber Pro Series Rookie of the Year; WorldCom Rising Star Award; IndyCar Series Rookie of the Year; Indianapolis 500 Rookie of the Year; Best Driver ESPY Award

IndyCar Series career
- 252 races run over 18 years
- Team: No. 31 (Arrow McLaren)
- Best finish: 1st (2012)
- First race: 2007 Honda 200 (Mid-Ohio)
- Last race: 2026 Indianapolis 500 (Indianapolis)
- First win: 2008 Camping World Indy Grand Prix at the Glen (Watkins Glen)
- Last win: 2018 GoPro Grand Prix of Sonoma (Sonoma)
Wins	Podiums	Poles
16	44	6

Champ Car career
- 43 races run over 3 years
- Years active: 2003–2005
- Team(s): American Spirit Team Johansson (2003); Herdez Competition (2004); Rocketsports Racing (2005)
- Best finish: 9th (2004)
- First race: 2003 Grand Prix of St. Petersburg (Streets of St. Petersburg)
- Last race: 2005 Hurricane Relief 400 (Las Vegas)
- First win: 2003 Lexmark Indy 300 (Surfers Paradise)
- Last win: 2004 Time Warner Cable Road Runner 250 (Milwaukee)
Wins	Podiums	Poles
2	3	1

Previous series
- 1998, 2000–2001 2002 2002, 2010–2013 2003–2005 2006–2013 2006 2012 2014: Barber Dodge Pro Series; Atlantic Championship; American Le Mans Series; Champ Car World Series; Rolex Grand-Am Sports Car Series; A1 Grand Prix; Race of Champions; IMSA Tudor United SportsCar Championship

Ryan Christopher Hunter-Reay (born December 17, 1980) nicknamed RHR, is an American professional racing driver who won the Indianapolis 500 (2014) and the IndyCar Series championship (2012). He currently is the sporting director for IndyCar Series team Arrow McLaren and competes part-time in the IndyCar Series for Arrow McLaren. Hunter-Reay also won in the now defunct Champ Car World Series twice and the Toyota Grand Prix of Long Beach. Hunter-Reay has competed in the Race of Champions, A1 Grand Prix, and sports car racing series including American Le Mans Series, the Rolex Grand-Am Sports Car Series and the IMSA Tudor United SportsCar Championship.

Hunter-Reay previously drove for Andretti Autosport in the IndyCar Series. When Hunter-Reay initially joined Andretti for 2010, he was only signed to drive for a partial season. Additional sponsorship was found and Hunter-Reay drove the entire season for Andretti. Prior to 2023, Hunter-Reay drove the number 28 car in the NTT IndyCar Series as a show of support for the estimated 28 million people living with cancer worldwide. Hunter-Reay, who lost his mother to colon cancer in 2009, acts as a spokesman on behalf of Racing for Cancer, an advocacy organization.

== Career history ==
=== Early career ===
After winning six national karting championships in the World Karting Association, Hunter-Reay won a Skip Barber Karting Scholarship to race in Skip Barber Formula Dodge Series in 1999. Hunter-Reay won the series championship. Hunter-Reay then won a shootout against Formula Dodge drivers for the Skip Barber Big Scholarship and its $250,000 prize. Hunter-Reay would use the scholarship money to compete in the Barber Dodge Pro Series in 2000.

==== Barber Dodge Pro Series ====
Hunter-Reay began to compete in the Barber Dodge Pro Series in 1998. Hunter-Reay would drive the No. 28 Reynard 98E-Dodge V6 with no sponsorship. Hunter-Reay first competed in the race at Mid-Ohio Sports Car Course. In the race Hunter-Reay started and finished in 23rd place after being involved in crash with John McCaig on lap 22. Hunter-Reay returned to the series later in the season at the race at Metro-Dade Homestead Motorsports Complex. Hunter-Reay started in 21st place and finished in 22nd place after retiring due to damage to his car after four laps. Hunter-Reay scored no points towards the championship and finished 40th in the final point standings.

Hunter-Reay returned to the series in 2000 to drive the No. 31 Reynard 98E-Dodge V6 with no sponsorship, but as winner of the Barber Dodge "Big Scholarship" Shootout. At the season-opening race at Sebring International Raceway Hunter-Reay started in ninth place and finished in eighth place. Hunter-Reay would qualify on the pole position at the race at BC Place in Vancouver and would finish in eighth place in the race. Hunter-Reay's best finish during the season was a second-place finish at the race at Nazareth Speedway. Hunter-Reay would finish fifth in the final point standings with 104 points, including four Top-5 finishes and an ultra-consistent 11 Top-10s in 12 races. Hunter-Reay would also win the Barber Dodge Pro Series Rookie of the Year award, which included a full sponsorship from the series for the following season.

Hunter-Reay returned to the series in 2001 to drive the No. 31 Barber Dodge Pro Series Rookie of the Year/Simpson Performance Products Reynard 98E-Dodge V6. Hunter-Reay would win his first race in the series at the third race of the season, at Lime Rock Park. In the race Hunter-Reay started in second place and led for 21 of thirty laps and would set the fastest lap of the race. Hunter-Reay would win his second, and final, race in the series at Exhibition Place. In the race Hunter-Reay only led the final six laps of the race after passing Matt Plumb, who had qualified on the pole position, had the fastest lap of the race and every lap in the race up to that point. Hunter-Reay would also have a pair of second place finishes at the races at Sebring International Raceway and Lime Rock Park. Hunter-Reay would finish fifth in the final point standings with 114 points.

==== Atlantic Championship ====
Hunter-Reay began to compete in the Toyota Atlantic Championship, at the time the main development series for the FedEx CART Championship Series, in 2002. Hunter-Reay would drive the No. 1 Medlock Ames Winery/U.S. Print Swift 014.a-Toyota 4A-GE for Hylton Motorsports. Hunter-Reay would make his debut at Fundidora Park. Hunter-Reay would start in sixth place and retire to finish in 23rd place. At the second race of the season, on the Streets of Long Beach Hunter-Reay started in second place and finished in eighteenth place after having the fastest lap of the race. At the third race of the season, at the Milwaukee Mile, Hunter-Reay qualified on the pole position, had the fastest lap of the race and led the most laps of the race. Hunter-Reay would retire from the race to finish in nineteenth place. At the fourth race of the season, at Laguna Seca Raceway, Hunter-Reay qualified on the pole position, had the fastest lap of the race and led the most laps to get his first win in the series. Hunter-Reay would then finish in fourth place at the following race of the season, at Portland International Raceway. At the sixth race of the season, at Chicago Motor Speedway, Hunter-Reay started in sixth place and led the most laps and had the fastest lap of the race to win his second race of the season. At the seventh race of the season, at Exhibition Place, Hunter-Reay started in seventh place and finished in fourth place. Hunter-Reay would then get his third, and final, win of both the season and his Atlantics career at the eighth race of the season, at Burke Lakefront Airport, after leading the most laps. Hunter-Reay would then start fifteenth and finish seventh at the following race, at Circuit Trois-Rivières. At the tenth race of the season, at Road America, Hunter-Reay started eighth and retired from the race to finish in 24th place. Hunter-Reay then started sixth and finished 22nd at the following race, at Circuit Gilles Villeneuve. At the following race of the season, the season-ending race at the Pepsi Center, Hunter-Reay retired from the race and finished in an unknown position. Hunter-Reay finished out the season ranked in sixth place in the final point standings with 102 points.

=== Indy car racing ===
==== Champ Car World Series ====
Hunter-Reay began to compete in the Champ Car World Series in 2003 to drive the No. 31 American Spirit Team Johansson Reynard 02i-Ford Cosworth XFE for American Spirit Team Johansson, a team owned by former Formula One and Champ Car World Series driver Stefan Johansson. The previous year Reynard Motorsports filed for bankruptcy and the Champ Car program became owned by Walker Racing. The chassis struggled to compete with the Lola B02/00. The team also competed for the majority of the season without sponsorship. The only race that the team ran with sponsorship was the Gran Premio Telmex-Gigante at Autódromo Hermanos Rodríguez where the car ran with sponsorship from Gonher de Mexico. In the first twelve races of the season Hunter-Reay's best start was a seventh at the G.I. Joe's 200 at Portland International Raceway and a best finish of sixth at the Molson Indy Vancouver at Concord Pacific Place. During this time Hunter-Reay was ranked fourteenth in points. At the thirteenth race of the season, the Champ Car Grand Prix of Mid-Ohio at Mid-Ohio Sports Car Course Hunter-Reay qualified in second place and finished in third place. Five races later at the season-ending Lexmark Indy 300 at the Surfers Paradise Street Circuit Hunter-Reay started from twelfth place and would make his first of three mandatory pit stops to get slick tires as the track was changing from wet to dry in various parts of the track. Hunter-Reay would soon lead for fifteen laps and would keep his car on the track while several other cars were crashing and/or spinning off of the track. Hunter-Reay would go on to win his first Champ Car race.

Hunter-Reay began to drive for Herdez Competition in 2004 in the No. 4 Herdez Lola B02/00-Ford Cosworth XFE. In the third race of the season, the Time Warner Cable Road Runner 250 at the Milwaukee Mile, Hunter-Reay would qualify on the pole position and lead for all 250 laps to get his second and final Champ Car win. Following the race Hunter-Reay was ranked third in points. Hunter-Reay's best finish in the remaining races was a fourth at the Grand Prix of Road America at Road America. In the race Hunter-Reay started second and made contact with former teammate Jimmy Vasser on the first lap and dropped the two to the rear of the field. Hunter-Reay charged up through the field to get fourth place while Vasser finished eighth. Hunter-Reay would finish ninth in points (the only time Hunter-Reay finished in the top-ten in points in Champ Car) with 199 points.

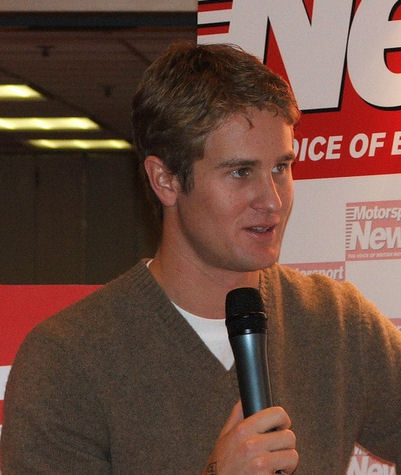
Hunter-Reay at the Autosport International in 2005.

In 2005, Hunter-Reay began to drive for Rocketsports Racing in the No. 31 Lola B02/00-Ford Cosworth XFE. The car did not have consistent sponsorship and had to have sponsorship for various races from autobytel.com, Briggs & Stratton, Cytomax and Red Paw Systems. At the Grand Prix of Denver at the Pepsi Center, the car ran without sponsorship. Hunter-Reay's best finish during the season was a pair of sixth place finishes at the Molson Indy Toronto at Exhibition Place and at Denver. Following the Hurricane Relief 400 at Las Vegas Motor Speedway, where he started 16th and finished tenth, Hunter-Reay was replaced by Michael McDowell for the final two races of the season. Hunter-Reay was 14th in points following the Las Vegas event and would drop to fifteenth in points after the last two races of the season with 110 points.

==== IndyCar Series ====
===== 2007–2010 =====
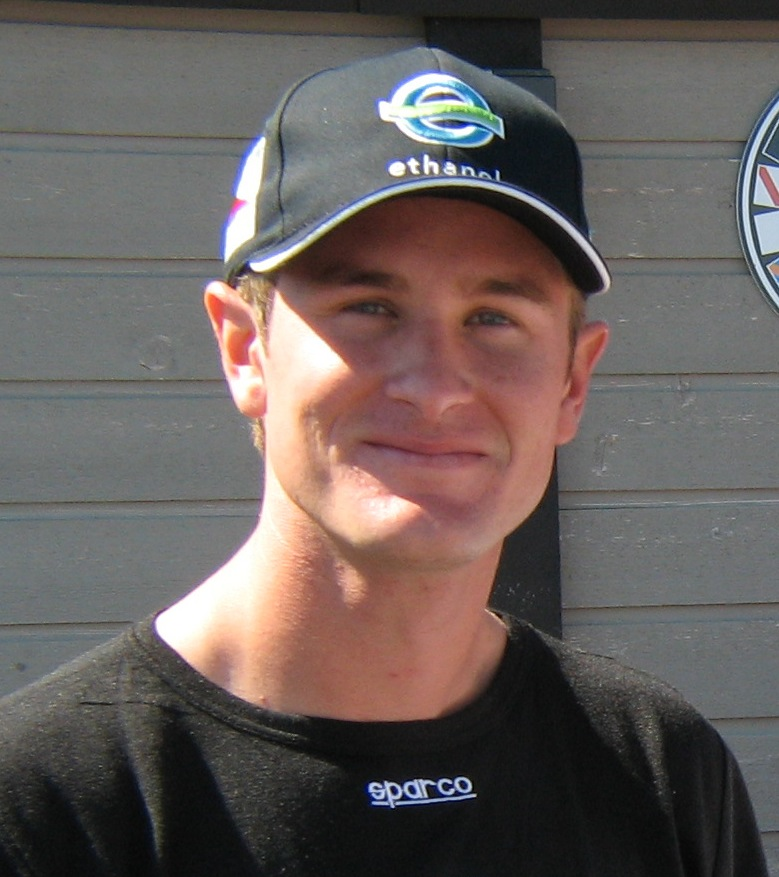
Hunter-Reay In 2007

Hunter-Reay began to drive for Rahal Letterman Racing in the No. 17 Honda for the final six races of the season as a replacement for the released Jeff Simmons. Hunter-Reay made his series debut at the Honda 200 at Mid-Ohio Sports Car Course. In his debut Hunter-Reay, started tenth and finished seventh. At the following race, the Firestone Indy 400 at Michigan International Speedway, Hunter-Reay started twelfth in the race and had to make a pit stop to replace his damaged helmet. He would finish in sixth place and would be the last car on the lead lap. Hunter-Reay's best start of the season was a fifth at the Detroit Indy Grand Prix at Belle Isle State Park, where he finished eighteenth (last) due to clutch problems after 24 laps. Hunter-Reay would finish seventh after starting twelfth at the season-ending Peak Antifreeze Indy 300 at Chicagoland Speedway. Despite only competing in six races, Hunter-Reay was able to finish 19th in points with 119 points and would win the series rookie of the year award, setting the record for fewest starts in a season by a driver who won the award.

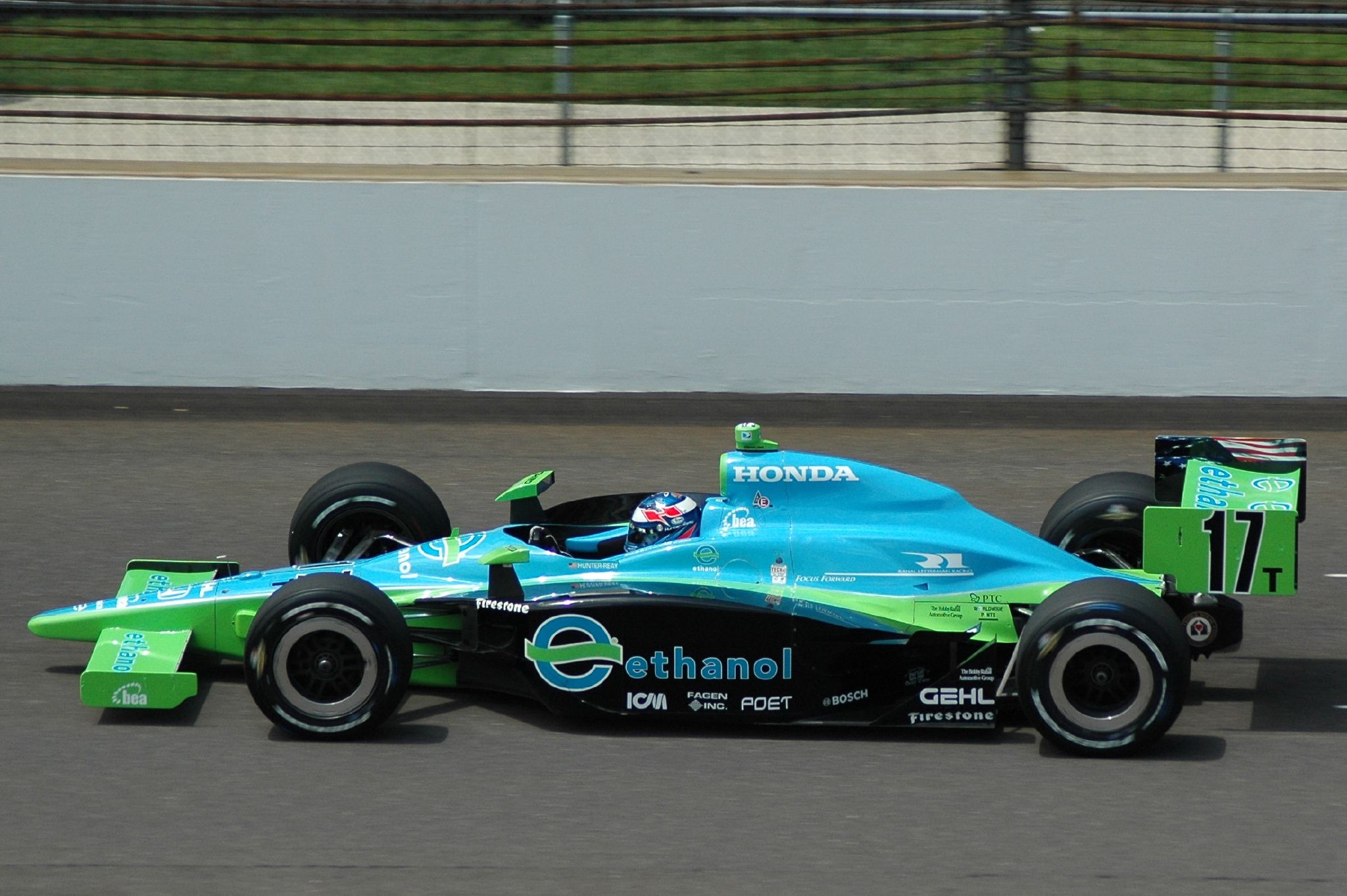
Hunter-Reay practicing for the 2008 Indianapolis 500.

Hunter-Reay returned with Rahal Letterman Racing in 2008. At the season-opening Gainsco Auto Insurance Indy 300 at Homestead-Miami Speedway Hunter-Reay started ninth and finished seventh. Hunter-Reay would then get another seventh at the Indy Japan 300 at Twin Ring Motegi after starting tenth. At the Indianapolis 500 Hunter-Reay qualified in twentieth place on the third qualifying day after crashing in turn three on Pole Day. However, he managed to finish the race without incident, finishing in sixth place and winning the race's rookie of the year award. During the next four races Hunter-Reay's best finish was an eighth at the Iowa Corn Indy 250 at Iowa Speedway.

At the Camping World Indy Grand Prix at the Glen at Watkins Glen International, Hunter-Reay started in third place and was running in fourth place late in the race between Ryan Briscoe, Scott Dixon and Darren Manning. Briscoe and Dixon then made contact and dropped down the running order as a result. Manning took the lead only for Hunter-Reay to take it away on a lap 52 restart. Hunter-Reay would win his first IndyCar Series race and Rahal Letterman would win their first race in four years. Hunter-Reay's best finish in the remaining races of 2008 was a sixth at the Detroit Indy Grand Prix at Belle Isle State Park. Hunter-Reay finished out the season ranked eighth in points with 360 points. Following the end of the season, there was a non-points race, the Nikon Indy 300 on the Surfers Paradise Street Circuit. In the race, Hunter-Reay started fifth and finished third.

At the end of the year, American Ethanol withdrew their sponsorship due to financial problems and left Hunter-Reay without a team. Prior to the season Hunter-Reay tested a car for HVM Racing. Hunter-Reay was eventually offered a position at Vision Racing to drive the #21 Vision Racing Dallara IR07-Ilmor-Indy V8 HI7R. The team had no sponsorship to start off the season, despite this Hunter-Reay managed to start fourteenth and finish second at the season-opening Honda Grand Prix of St. Petersburg on the Streets of St. Petersburg. In the process, Hunter-Reay gave Vision their best finish in an IndyCar Series race. Hunter-Reay's next best finish for the team came at the next race of the season, the Toyota Grand Prix of Long Beach on the Streets of Long Beach where Hunter-Reay started twelfth and finished eleventh. At the Indianapolis 500, the team found sponsorship from Izod and William Rast. Hunter-Reay struggled to qualify for the race and on Bump Day at 5:52 p.m. Hunter-Reay was bumped from the field by John Andretti. Hunter-Reay was able to requalify, bumping Alex Tagliani by 0.0324 seconds. Hunter-Reay started 32nd after Tagliani replaced teammate Bruno Junqueira in his qualified car. In the race Hunter-Reay spun in turn four on lap twenty and crashed, resulting in a 32nd place finish. Following the Bombardier Learjet 550 at Texas Motor Speedway, Hunter-Reay and Vision parted ways. He was then announced as the replacement for Vítor Meira, who was injured while racing at Indianapolis, in the No. 14 ABC Supply Company Dallara IR07-Ilmor-Indy V8 HI7R for A. J. Foyt Enterprises. He would only get two top-tens for Foyt with a seventh at the Honda Indy Toronto at Exhibition Place and a fourth at the Honda Indy 200 at Mid-Ohio Sports Car Course, and finished 15th in the points.

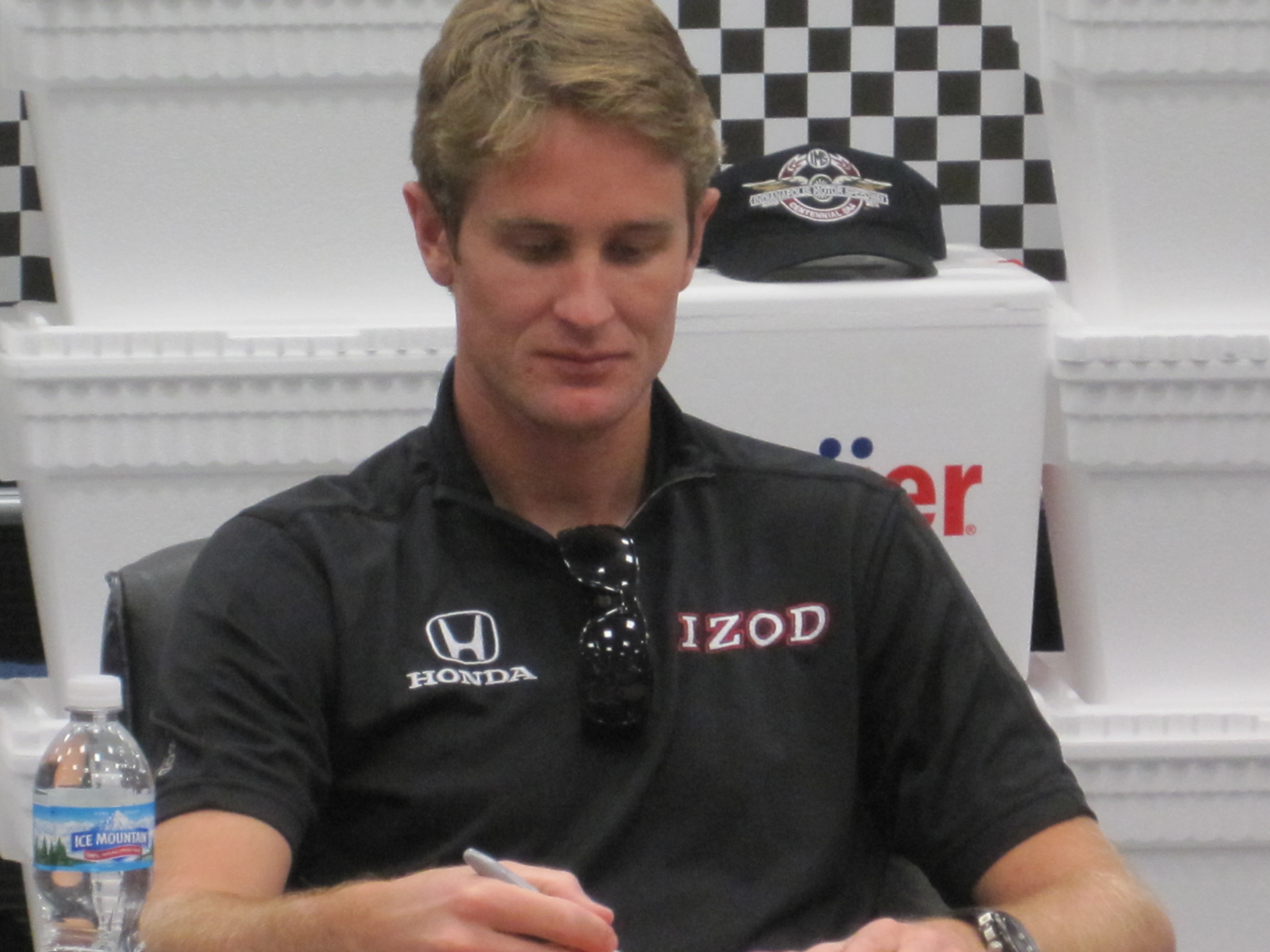
Hunter-Reay in 2010 at an autograph signing.

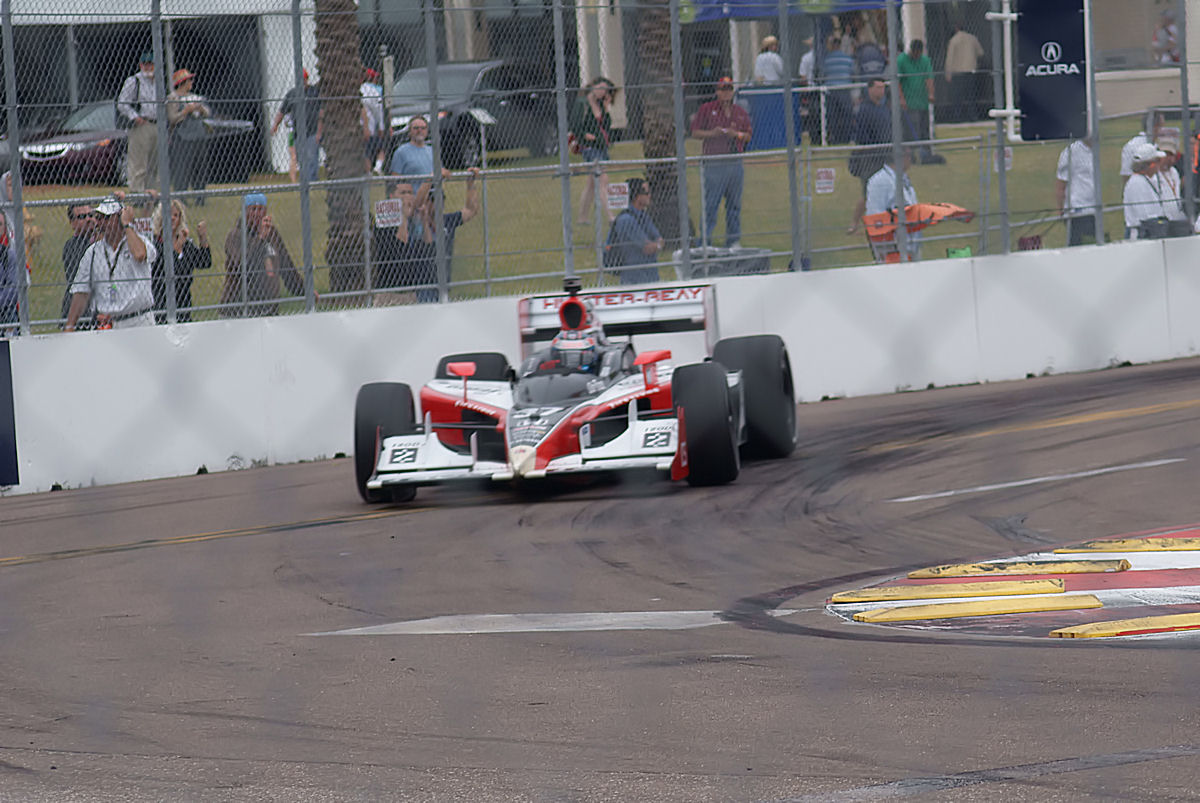
Hunter-Reay competing in the 2010 Honda Grand Prix of St. Petersburg on the Streets of St. Petersburg.

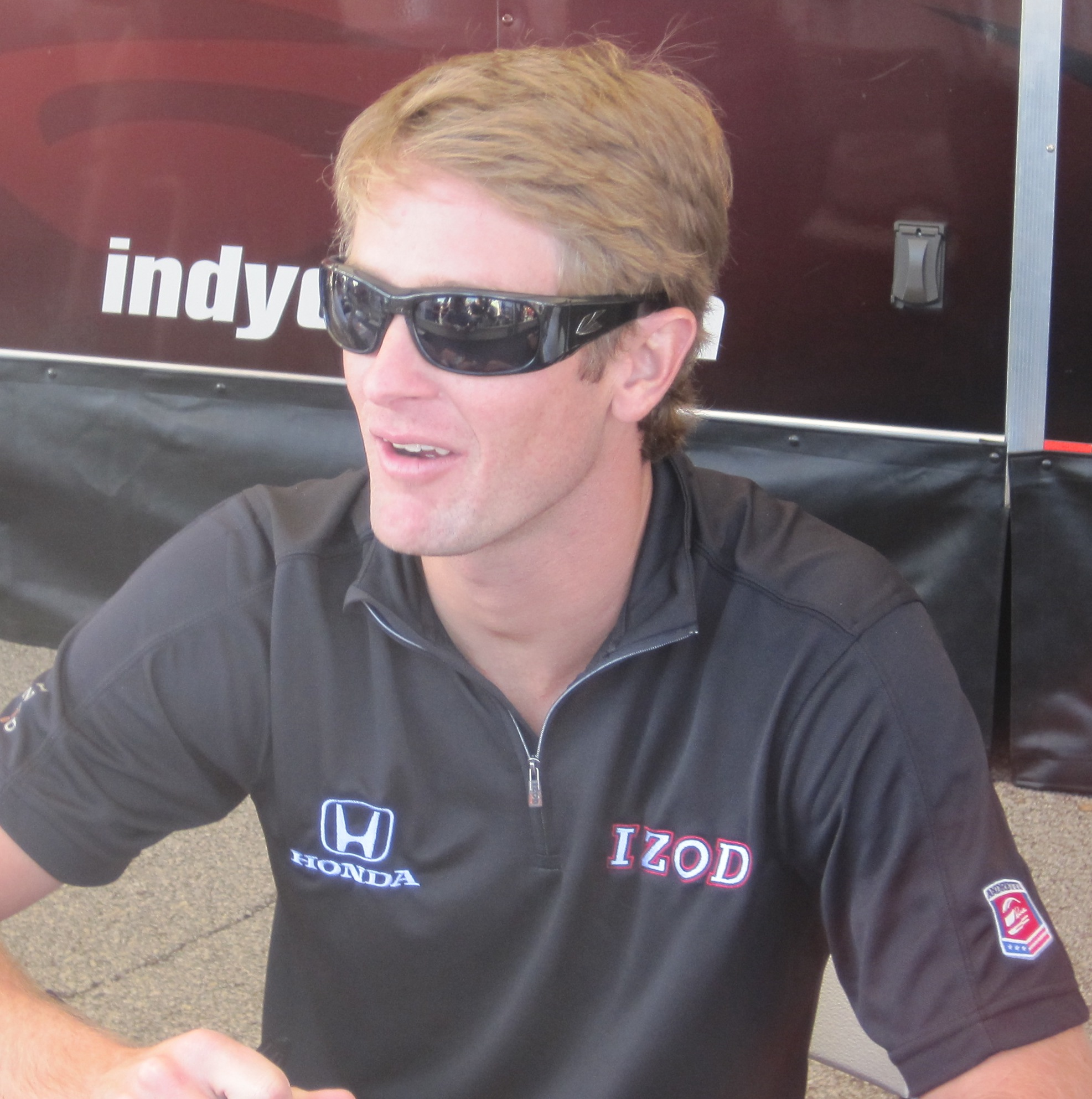
Hunter-Reay in May 2010 at an autograph signing at the Indianapolis Motor Speedway.

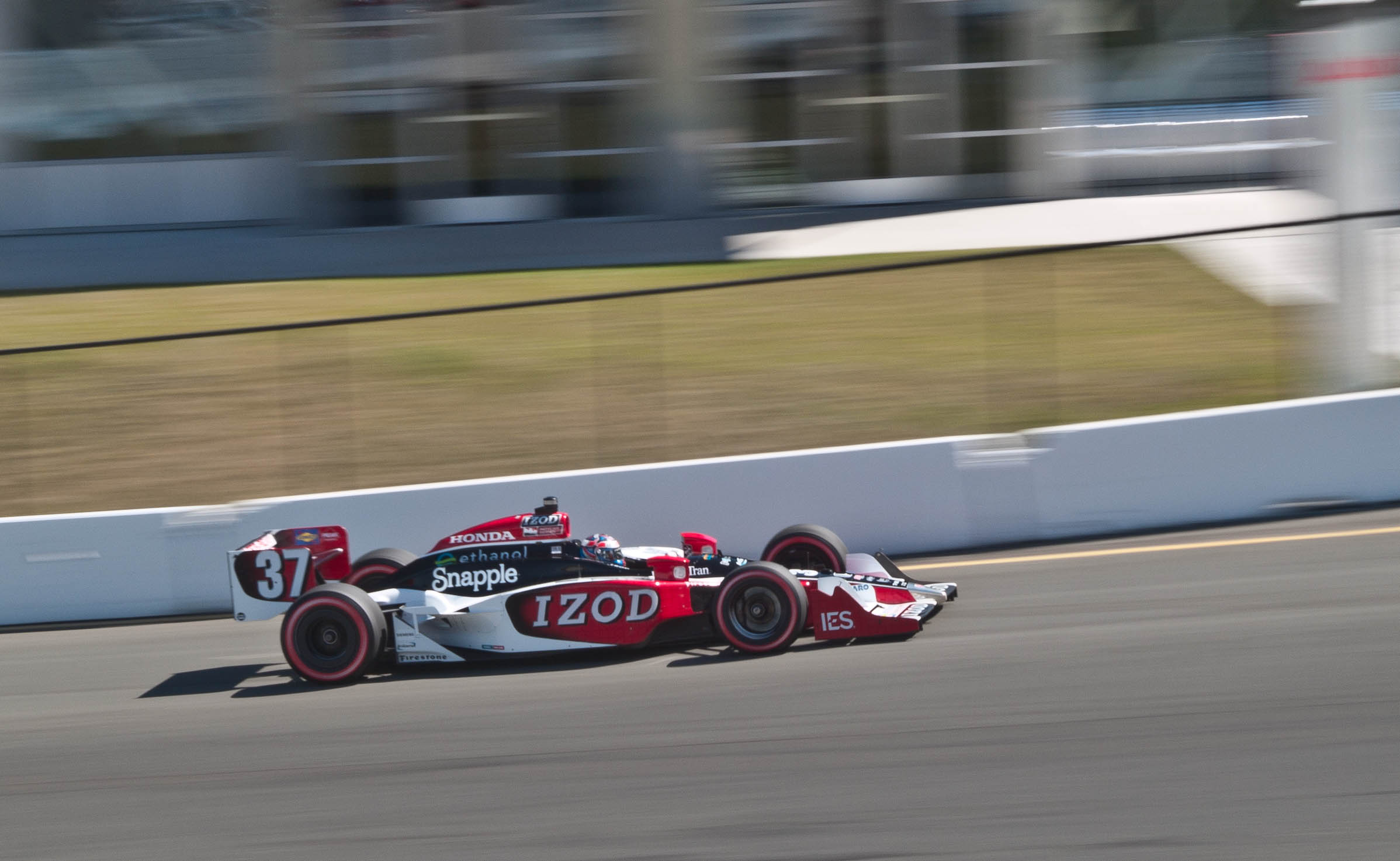
Hunter-Reay competing in the 2010 Indy Grand Prix of Sonoma at Infineon Raceway.

In 2010, Hunter-Reay began to drive for Andretti Autosport in a part-time schedule that would consist of all races through the Indianapolis 500. Hunter-Reay would drive the No. 37 Izod Dallara IR07-Ilmor-Indy V8 HI7R. Within the first three races he ran in, he had a best finish of second at St Petersburg. Three races later at the Toyota Grand Prix of Long Beach on the Streets of Long Beach, he led for 64 of 85 laps to win the race.

At the Indianapolis 500, Hunter-Reay qualified in seventeenth place, and was on his way to a top-ten finish when on lap 199 in turn three, he ran out of fuel, causing Mike Conway to drive over the left side of Hunter-Reay's car and flip into the catchfence. At the same time Hunter-Reay lost control and drove into the wall. Hunter-Reay would finish in eighteenth place. Following the race Hunter-Reay was fifth in points and was given additional races. The team would race with additional sponsorship from American Ethanol at select races. Prior to the Camping World Grand Prix at The Glen at Watkins Glen International, Hunter-Reay was announced as a driver for all the remaining races. Hunter-Reay's best finish following Indianapolis was a third at the Honda Indy Toronto at Exhibition Place. He would finish seventh in the final point standings with 445 points.

During this initial stint with Andretti, a lack of funding for Hunter-Reay threatened to end his campaign with the team before the season concluded. Kanaan later disclosed that he contributed part of his own salary to help secure the sponsorship needed for Hunter-Reay to complete the season.

===== 2011–2014 =====
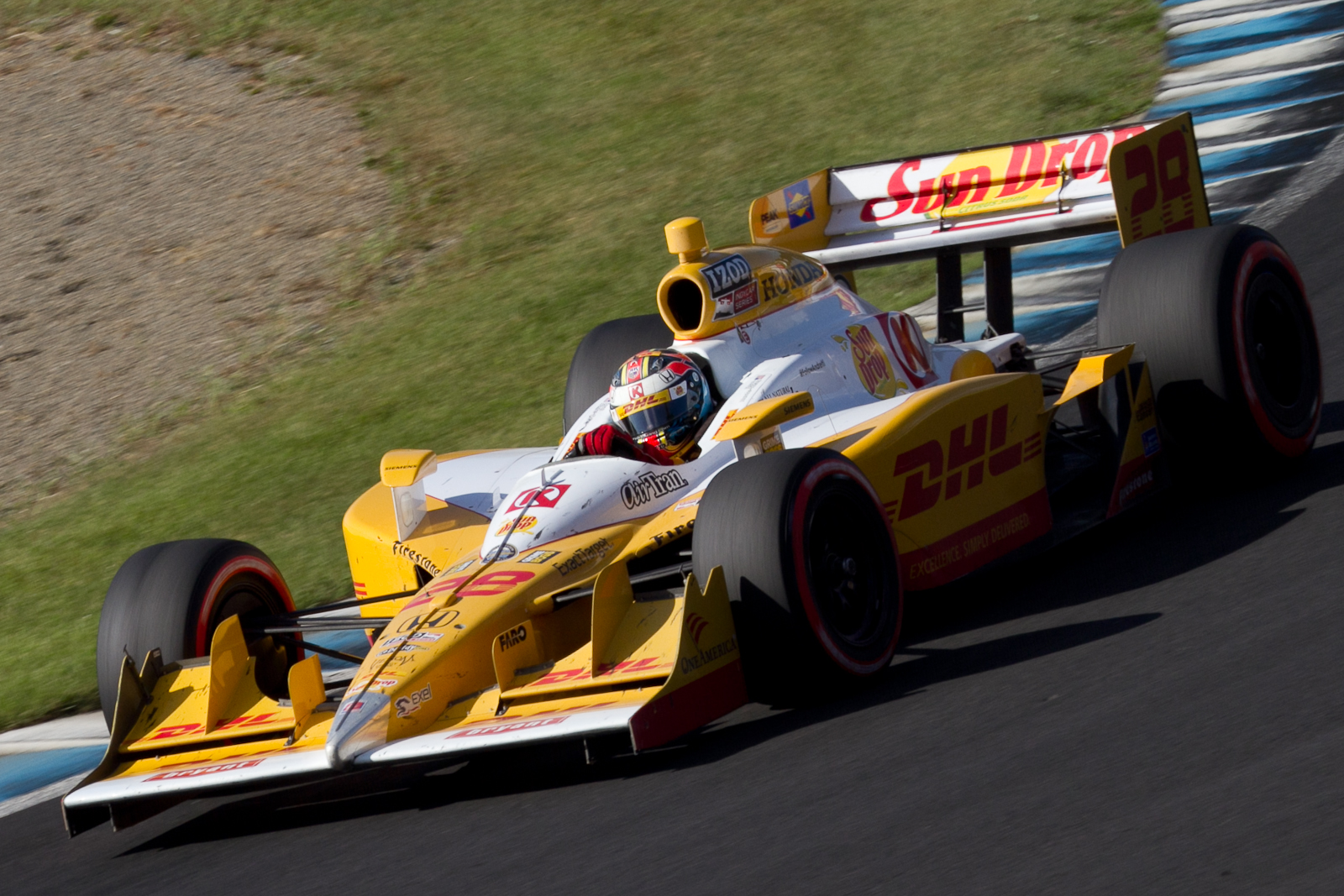
Hunter-Reay competing in the 2011 Indy Japan: The Final at Twin Ring Motegi.

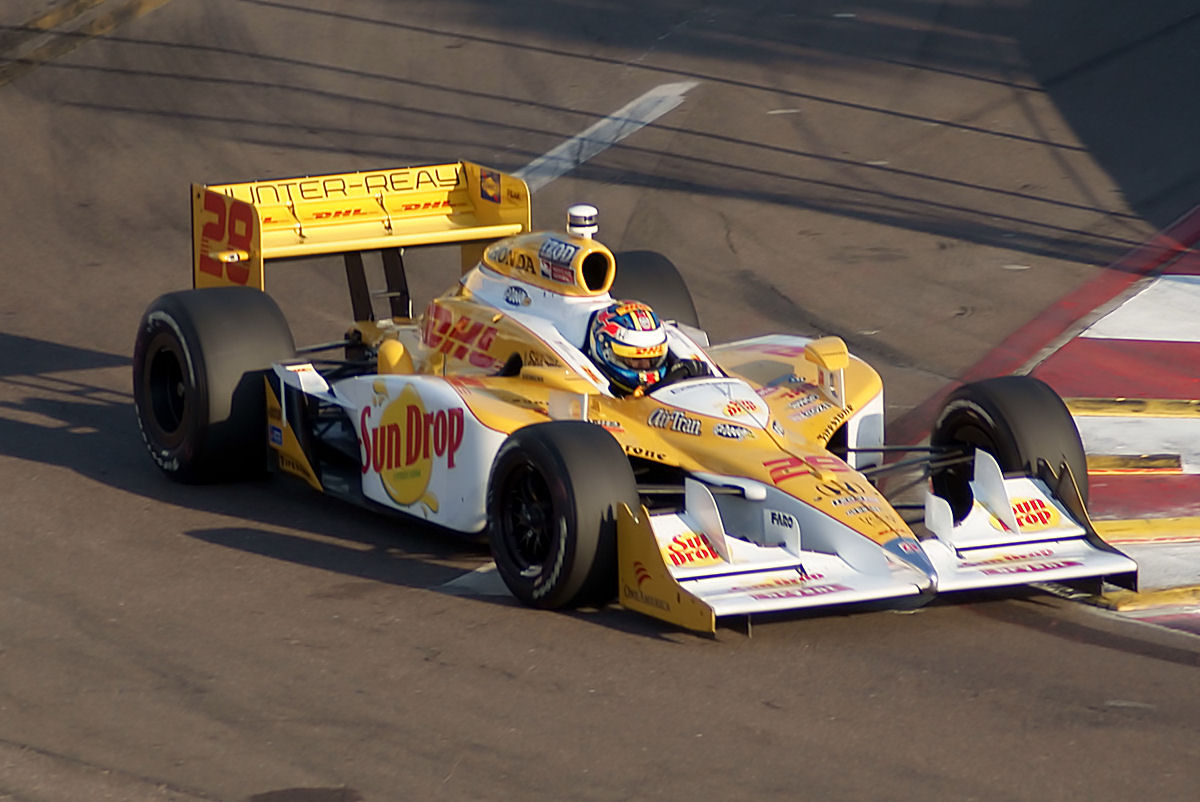
Hunter-Reay competing in the 2011 Honda Grand Prix of St. Petersburg on the Streets of St. Petersburg.

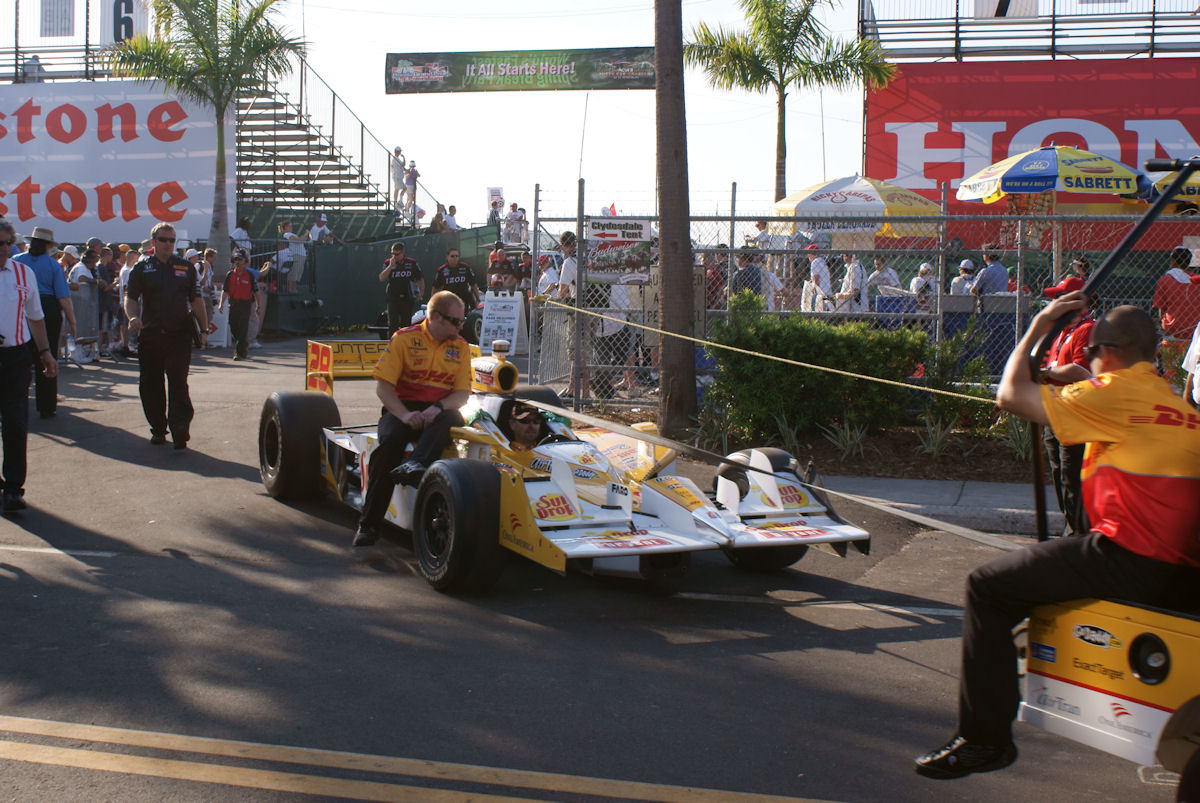
Hunter-Reay's car at the 2011 Honda Grand Prix of St. Petersburg on the Streets of St. Petersburg.

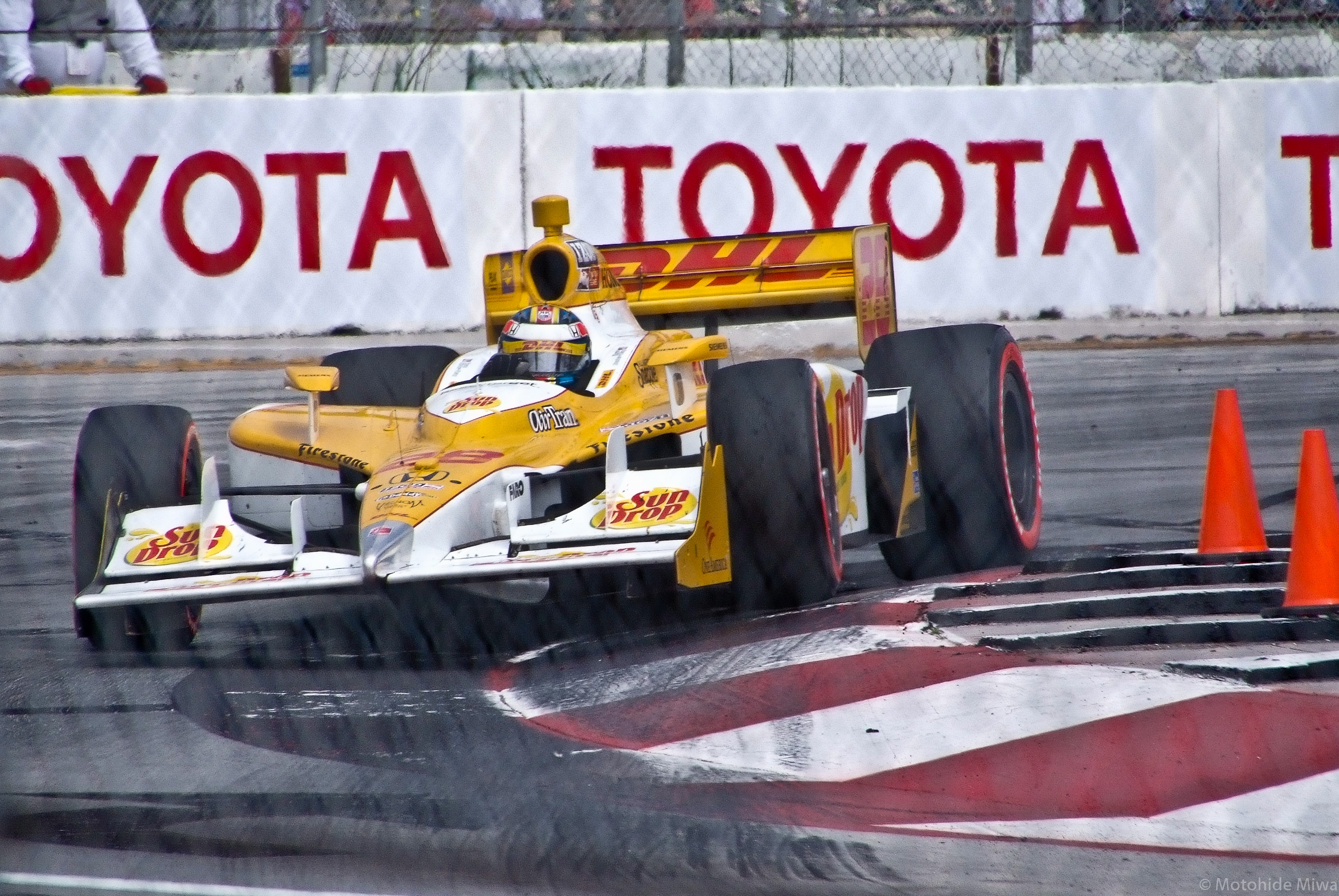
Hunter-Reay's car at the 2011 Toyota Grand Prix of Long Beach on the Streets of Long Beach.

In 2011, Hunter-Reay returned with Andretti Autosport to drive the No. 28 DHL/Sun Drop Dallara IR07-Ilmor-Indy V8 HI7R. At the Indianapolis 500, Hunter-Reay was bumped from the field by teammate Marco Andretti with 55 seconds left in qualifying on Bump Day. Andretti later made a deal with A. J. Foyt Enterprises for Hunter-Reay to replace Bruno Junqueira in his already-qualified car. Hunter-Reay would drive the No. 41 ABC Supply Company/DHL/Sun Drop Dallara IR07-Ilmor-Indy V8 HI7R, where he started 33rd and finished 23rd, three laps down.

Later in the year at the MoveThatBlock.com Indy 225 at New Hampshire Motor Speedway, Hunter-Reay started fifth and led for 71 laps. Hunter-Reay inherited the lead when several other drivers who had led the race, such as Dario Franchitti and Takuma Sato, were involved in crashes. Rain came in the late stages of the race. On lap 220 of 225, Hunter-Reay was leading Oriol Servià when the race was restarted and almost immediately teammate Danica Patrick spun due to the rain and collected several cars making the race go back to a caution. During this time Servià took the lead. INDYCAR officials decided to revert the results to lap 215 when the race was under caution for the rain.Hunter-Reay would finish seventh in points for the season with 347 points.

=== 2012 ===
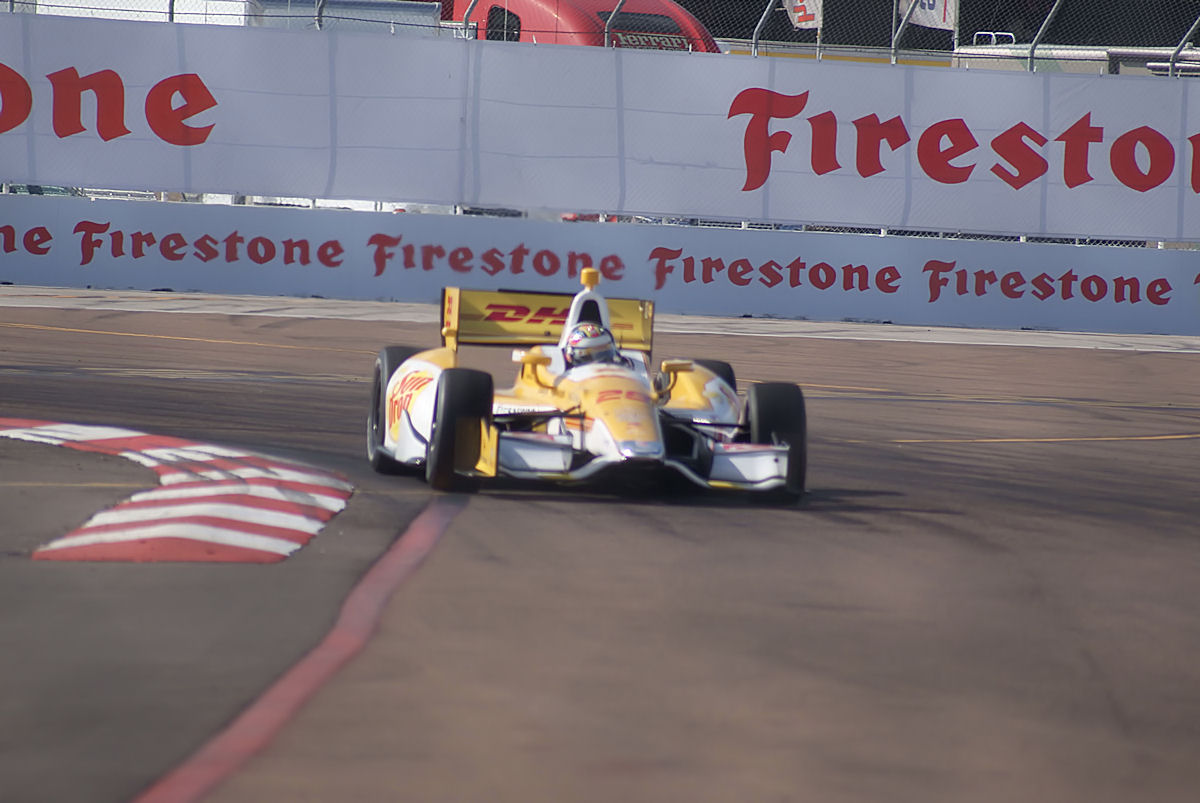
Hunter-Reay competing in the 2012 Honda Grand Prix of St. Petersburg on Streets of St. Petersburg.

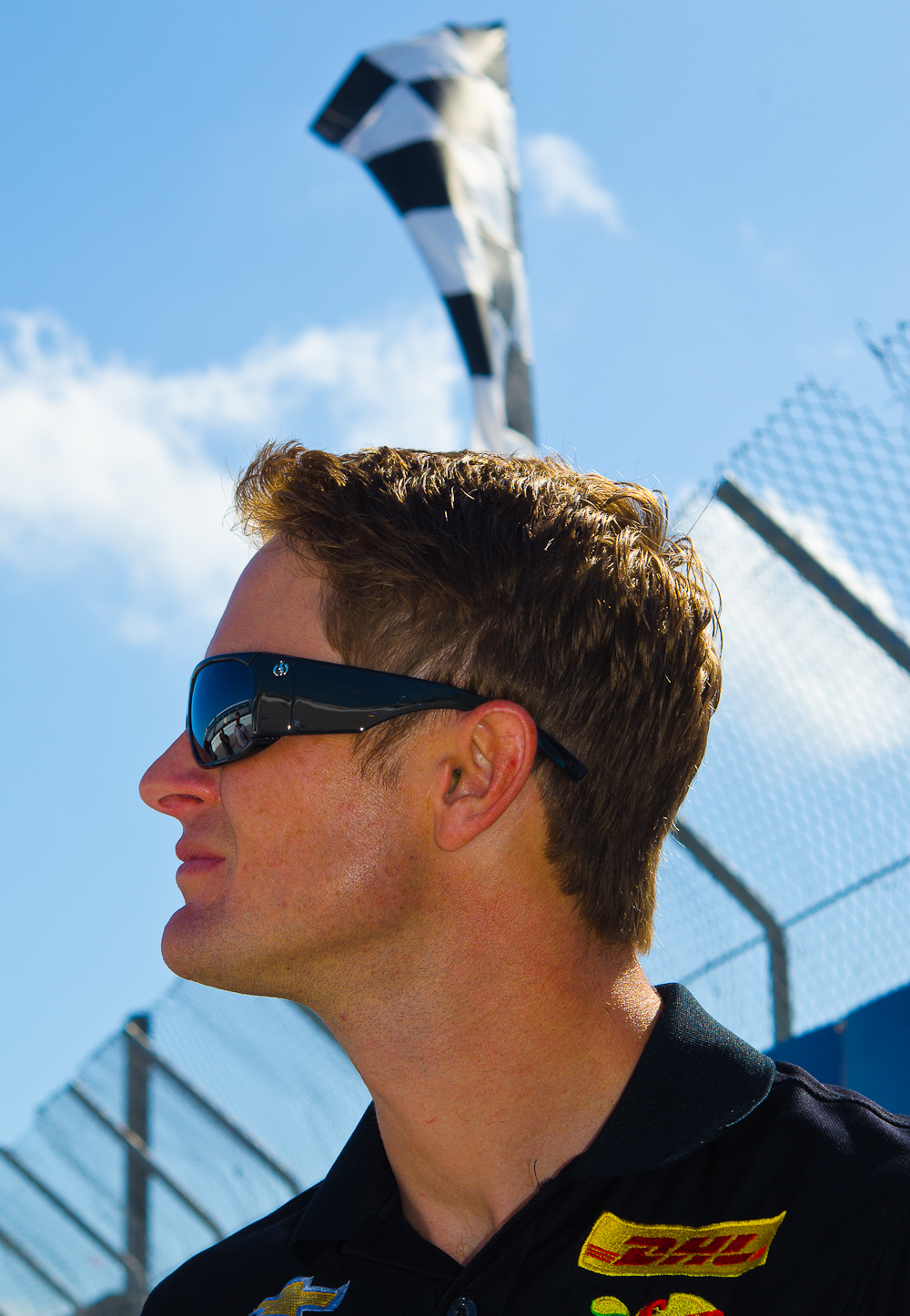
Hunter-Reay prior to the 2012 Honda Grand Prix of St. Petersburg on Streets of St. Petersburg.

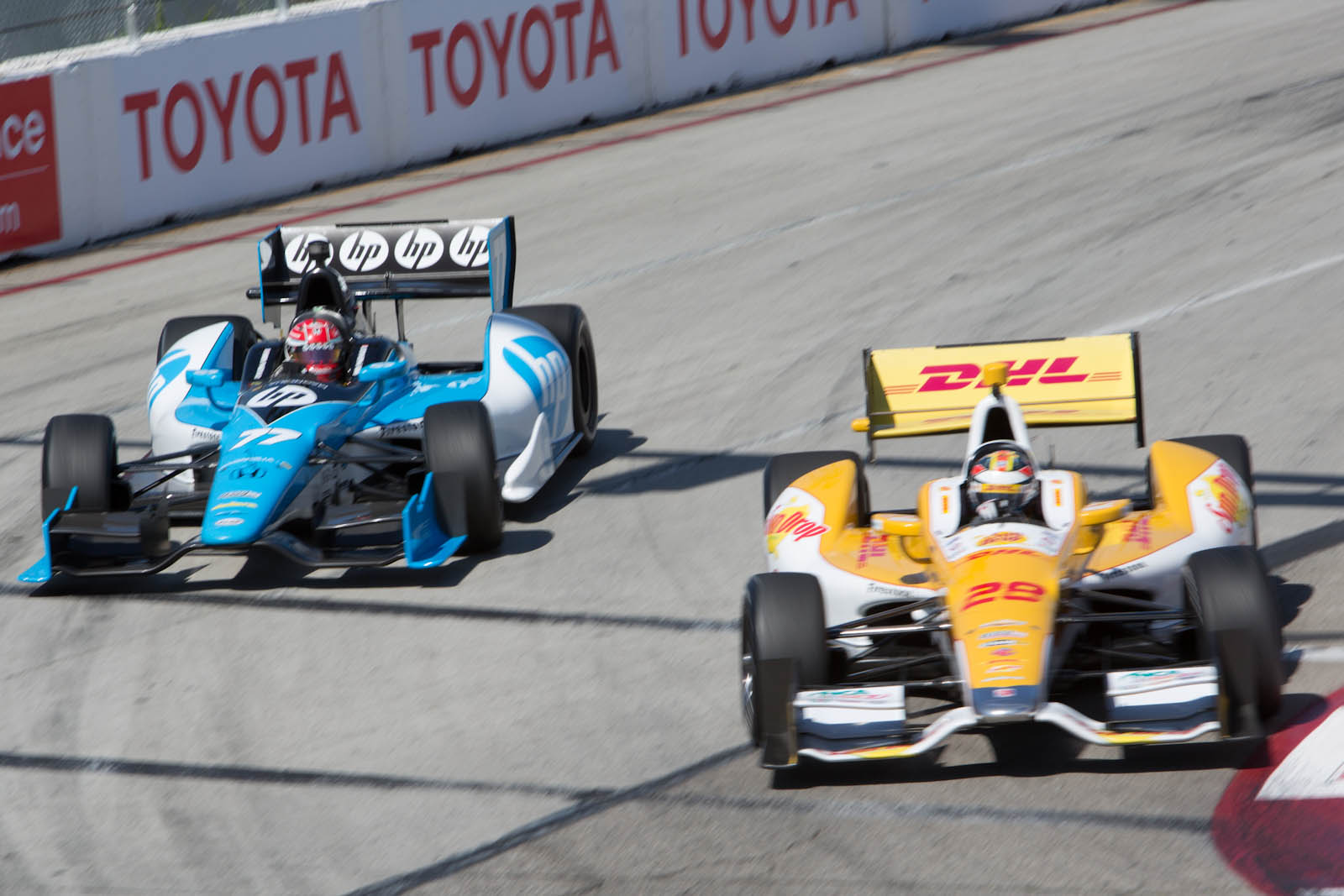
Hunter-Reay (right) competing with Simon Pagenaud at the 2012 Toyota Grand Prix of Long Beach on the Streets of Long Beach.

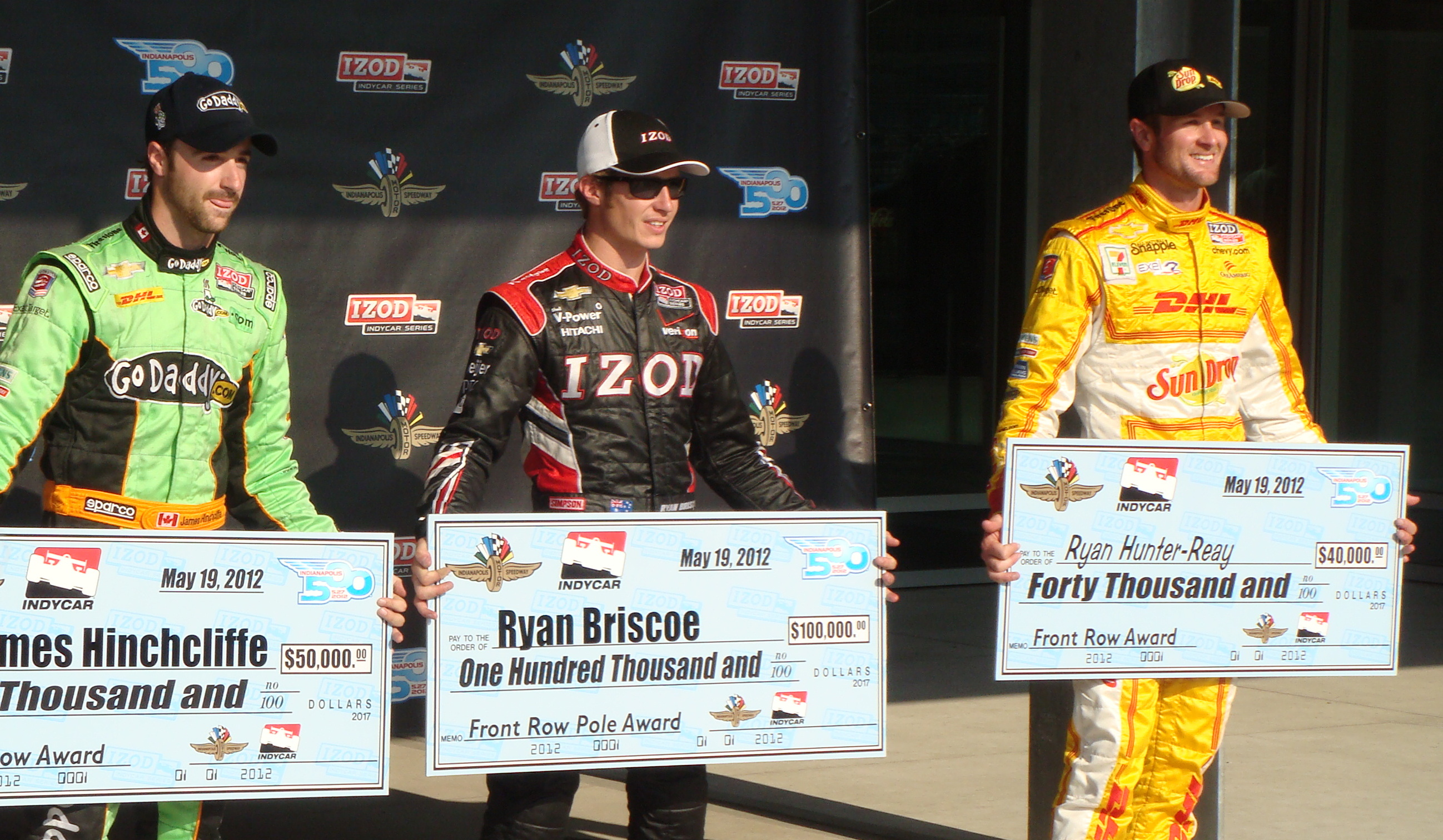
Hunter-Reay (right) posing with teammate James Hinchcliffe and Ryan Briscoe following Pole Day qualifying for the 2012 Indianapolis 500.

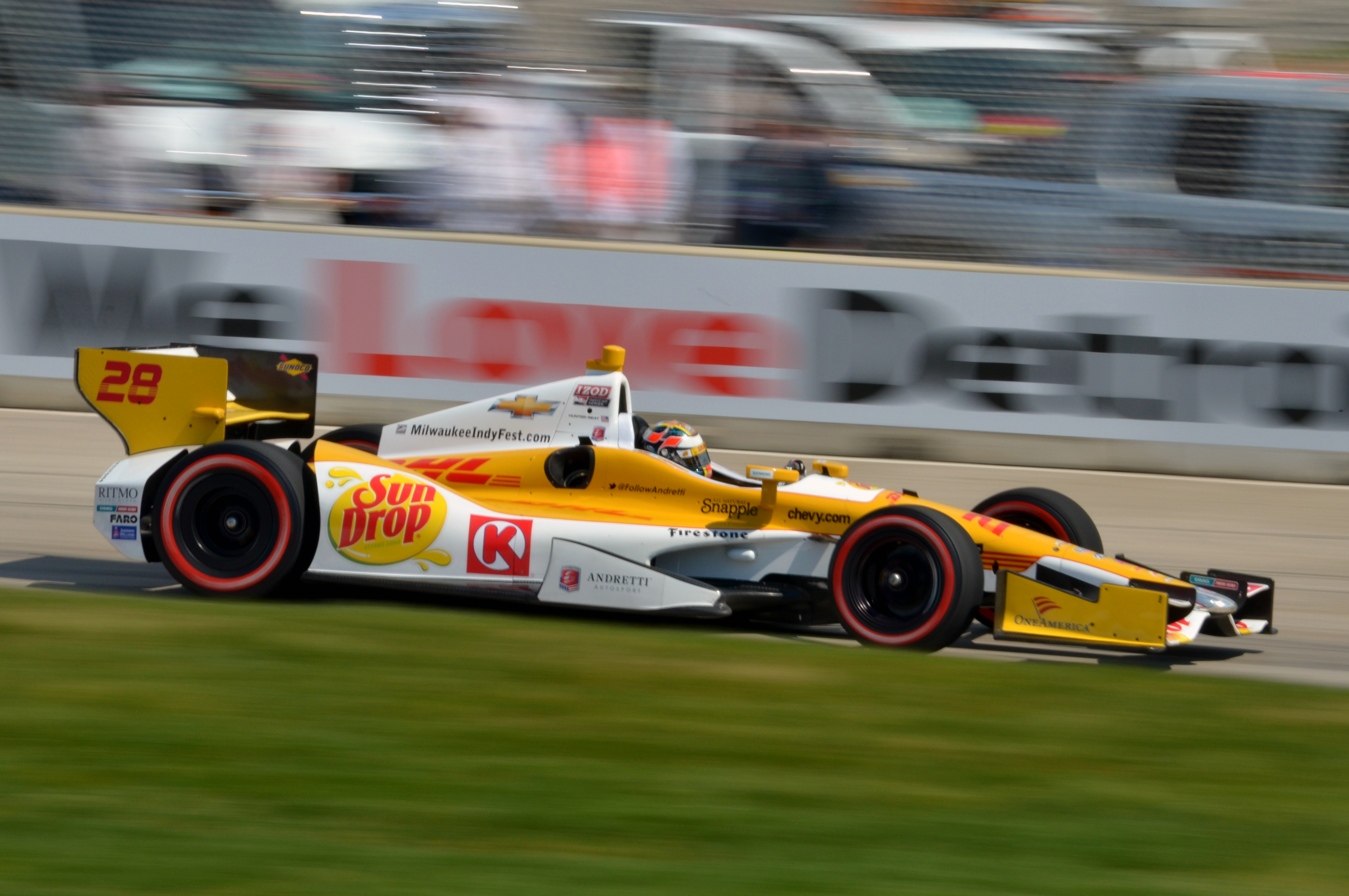
Hunter-Reay competing in the 2012 Detroit Belle Isle Grand Prix at Belles Isle State Park.

In 2012, Hunter-Reay returned to drive for Andretti Autosport in the No. 28 DHL/Sun Drop Dallara DW12-Ilmor-Chevrolet Indy V6 (the DW12 was named after Dan Wheldon, who had tested the car at both Mid-Ohio Sports Car Course and the Indianapolis Motor Speedway when it was called the Dallara IR12), with additional sponsorship from Circle K, Casey's General Stores, Dr. Pepper and Pelotonia.

Hunter-Reay won three consecutive races with the Milwaukee IndyFest at the Milwaukee Mile (a race that was, and still is, promoted by Hunter-Reay's team owner Michael Andretti), the Iowa Corn Indy 250 at Iowa Speedway and the Honda Indy Toronto at Exhibition Place. He took his final win of the year at the Grand Prix of Baltimore on the Streets of Baltimore.

At the season-ending MAVTV 500 IndyCar World Championships at Auto Club Speedway, Hunter-Reay and Power both had to receive 10-grid spot penalties due to both of them exceeding their five-engine change limit. Hunter-Reay was also battling Tony Kanaan for the A. J. Foyt Oval Championship. In the race, Hunter-Reay and Power were both running mid-pack early in the race. On lap 56, Power spun in turn two when he was slightly ahead of Hunter-Reay. Hunter-Reay would avoid Power. With Power in 25th place, Hunter-Reay needed to finish sixth or better to win the championship. Team Penske later managed to repair Power's car (a rarity for open-wheel race cars) in order for Power to complete additional laps. Power was able to complete 66 laps to move up to 24th place. Hunter-Reay now had to finish in fifth place or better. Hunter-Reay gradually moved up through the field and into the top-five to move into the championship lead. On lap 241, Kanaan crashed in turn 4 and the race was stopped. On the restart, Hunter-Reay managed to stay in the top-five. As the leaders started lap 250 (the final lap), Hunter-Reay was in turn four in fifth place when fourth place Takuma Sato spun and crashed. Hunter-Reay was able to avoid Sato just as Ed Carpenter passed Dario Franchitti for the lead. Carpenter would win the race while Hunter-Reay finished fourth and won both the overall and the oval championships. Hunter-Reay became the first American to win the series championship since Sam Hornish Jr. in 2006. Hunter-Reay would score 468 points to win the overall championship and 168 points to win the oval championship. Hunter-Reay also finished second in the Mario Andretti Road Course Championship with thre--hundred points compared to Power's 379. During the weekend of the championship Fontana race, Hunter-Reay was offered to drive a car at Team Penske in 2013. Hunter-Reay re-signed with Andretti for the 2013 and 2014 seasons. On December 5, Hunter-Reay announced that he would use car No. 1 in 2013. Hunter-Reay's usual number (28) would appear inside of the 1.

=== 2013 ===
For 2013, Hunter-Reay returned with Andretti Autosport to drive the No. 1 DHL/Sun Drop Dallara DW12-Ilmor-Chevrolet Indy V6 with additional sponsorship from Circle K, Dr. Pepper and Pelotonia. He would win only two races at Barber and Milwaukee and finsiehd on the podium four times. Hunter-Reay would finish seventh in points with 469 points.

=== 2014 ===
In 2014, Hunter-Reay returned with Andretti Autosport to drive the No. 28 DHL Dallara DW12-Honda Indy Turbo V6.

At the 2014 Indianapolis 500, Hunter-Reay qualified a disappointing nineteenth; however, he would win the race by 0.0600 seconds over Castroneves, the third-closest finish in Indianapolis 500 history behind 2026 and 1992.

Hunter-Reay would finish sixth in the final point standings with three wins and 563 points.

==== 2015–2021 ====
Hunter-Reay struggled significantly following the 2014 season. Over a six-year window, he only recorded five wins and no wins since winning in Sonoma in 2018, while Andretti Autosport as whole secured two Indianapolis 500 victories and younger drivers Alexander Rossi and Colton Herta emerged as the lead drivers for the team over the same span. On August 18, 2021, Hunter-Reay announced he would be leaving Andretti Autosport and would be taking a sabbatical from full time IndyCar competition, though he would return for the Indianapolis 500 and other select events with Dreyer & Reinbold Racing.

==== 2023–present ====
Hunter-Reay sat out the 2022 IndyCar Series, but did provide car development and insights for Juncos Hollinger Racing and then rookie Callum Ilott, helping to prep Ilott for the 106th Indianapolis 500.

In 2023, Hunter-Reay ran in the 107th Indianapolis 500 with Dreyer & Reinbold Racing, finishing eleventh overall in the race. On June 8, 2023, Hunter-Reay was announced as the replacement for the recently released Conor Daly at Ed Carpenter Racing. Team owner Ed Carpenter announced that Hunter-Reay would race the No. 20 Bitnile Chevrolet full-time for the remainder of the 2023 IndyCar Series. Hunter-Reay would be let go from ECR at the end of the 2023 Season to make way for 2023 Indy NXT Champion Christian Rasmussen. In 2024, Hunter-Reay would drive in the 108th Running of Indianapolis 500 driving again for Dreyer & Reinbold with Cusick Motorsports.

=== A1 Grand Prix ===
Hunter-Reay began to compete in A1 Grand Prix during the 2006–07 season. Hunter-Reay would represent the United States with Phil Giebler and Jonathan Summerton for A1 Team USA in a team entered by West Surrey Racing. Hunter-Reay would drive an A1 Team USA Lola B05/52-Zytek V8 (the series did not use numbers for the individual cars). Hunter-Reay was originally going to make his debut in the series at the A1 Grand Prix of Nations, Beijing, China on the Beijing International Streetcircuit. During practice for the race there was problems with a turn of the track that was 180 degrees. The track was eventually changed and Hunter-Reay never got to drive in the event. Hunter-Reay would make his debut at the sixth round of the season (the eleventh and twelfth races of the season), the A1 Grand Prix of Nations, New Zealand at Taupo Motorsport Park. In the sprint race Hunter-Reay started in 16th place and finished in 11th place. In the feature race the starting line up was determined by the results of the sprint race. As a result, Hunter-Reay started in eleventh place and would finish in tenth place. Hunter-Reay would not compete in any other A1 Grand Prix races during the season. The A1 Grand Prix team would finish in ninth place in the point standings with 42 points.

=== Sports car racing ===
==== American Le Mans Series ====
Hunter-Reay began to compete in the American Le Mans Series in 2002 at the Mobil 1 12 Hours of Sebring for JMB Racing in the No. 31 Aprimatic/Giesse Group Ferrari 360 Modena-Ferrari 3.6 L V8 with Peter Argetsinger and Andrea Montermini in the GT class. The car started sixth in its class and finished nineteenth due to a mechanical failure after 28 laps. The car would finish in 52nd place overall. JMB Racing would finish seventeenth in the GT teams championship (Hunter-Reay was unranked in the drivers championship).

Hunter-Reay would return to the series in 2010. Hunter-Reay would drive for Level 5 Motorsports in the No. 95 US Bank Oreca FLM09-Chevrolet 6.2 L V8 with Scott Tucker and James Gue in the LMPC class. At the 12 Hours of Sebring, the car started tenth overall and second in its class. The car would complete 224 laps to finish in 32nd place, sixth in class. Tucker and Hunter-Reay were going to drive the car at the following race, the Tequila Patrón American Le Mans Series at Long Beach on the Streets of Long Beach. The car would fail to start the race. Level 5 Motorsports would go on to win the LMPC teams championship (Hunter-Reay was unranked in the drivers championship).

In 2011, Hunter-Reay returned with Level 5 Motorsports to drive the No. 055 Microsoft Office 2010/Microsoft Azure/Alpina Watches Lola B11/40-HPD HR28TT 2.8 L Turbo V6 with Scott Tucker and Luis Díaz in the LMP2 class. At the season-opening 12 Hours of Sebring the car started 17th overall and second in its class. The car completed three-hundred laps to win its class and finish 20th overall. Hunter-Reay finished fourth in the LMP2 drivers standings with thirty points while Level 5 Motorsports won the LMP2 teams championship with 130 points.

For 2012, Hunter-Reay drove at the Mobil 1 12 Hours of Sebring for Level 5 Motorsports in the No. 95 Siemens/Alpina Watches/Ohiya Casino Resort HPD ARX-03b-Honda HR28TT 2.8 L Turbo V6 with Scott Tucker and Luis Díaz in the P2 class. The car started in eighteenth place overall and in third place in its class. The car retired after 85 laps and finished in 58th place overall and in fourth place in class. Hunter-Reay then competed in the season-ending Petit Le Mans for SRT Motorsports in the No. 91 Street & Racing Technology SRT Viper GTS-R-SRT 8.0 L V10 with Kuno Wittmer and Dominik Farnbacher in the GT class. The car started in 27th place overall and in ninth place in its class. The car completed 369 laps to finish in twentieth place overall and in eighth place in its class. Hunter-Reay was unranked in the P2 driver's standings and finished 27th in the GT drivers standings with seven points. SRT Motorsports finished eighth in the GT teams standings with twelve points and Level 5 Motorsports won the P2 teams championship with 203 points.

In 2013, Hunter-Reay drove for Level 5 Motorsports at the Mobil 1 12 Hours of Sebring in the No. 552 Siemens/Alpina Watches/Ohiya Casino Resort HPD ARX-03b-Honda HR28TT 2.8 L Turbo V6 with Scott Tucker and Simon Pagenaud. The car started in eighth place overall and in second place in its class. The car completed 345 laps to finish in seventh place overall and in second place in its class. Hunter-Reay finished tenth in the P2 drivers standings and Level 5 Motorsports won the P2 teams championship with 199 points.

==== Rolex Grand-Am Sports Car Series ====
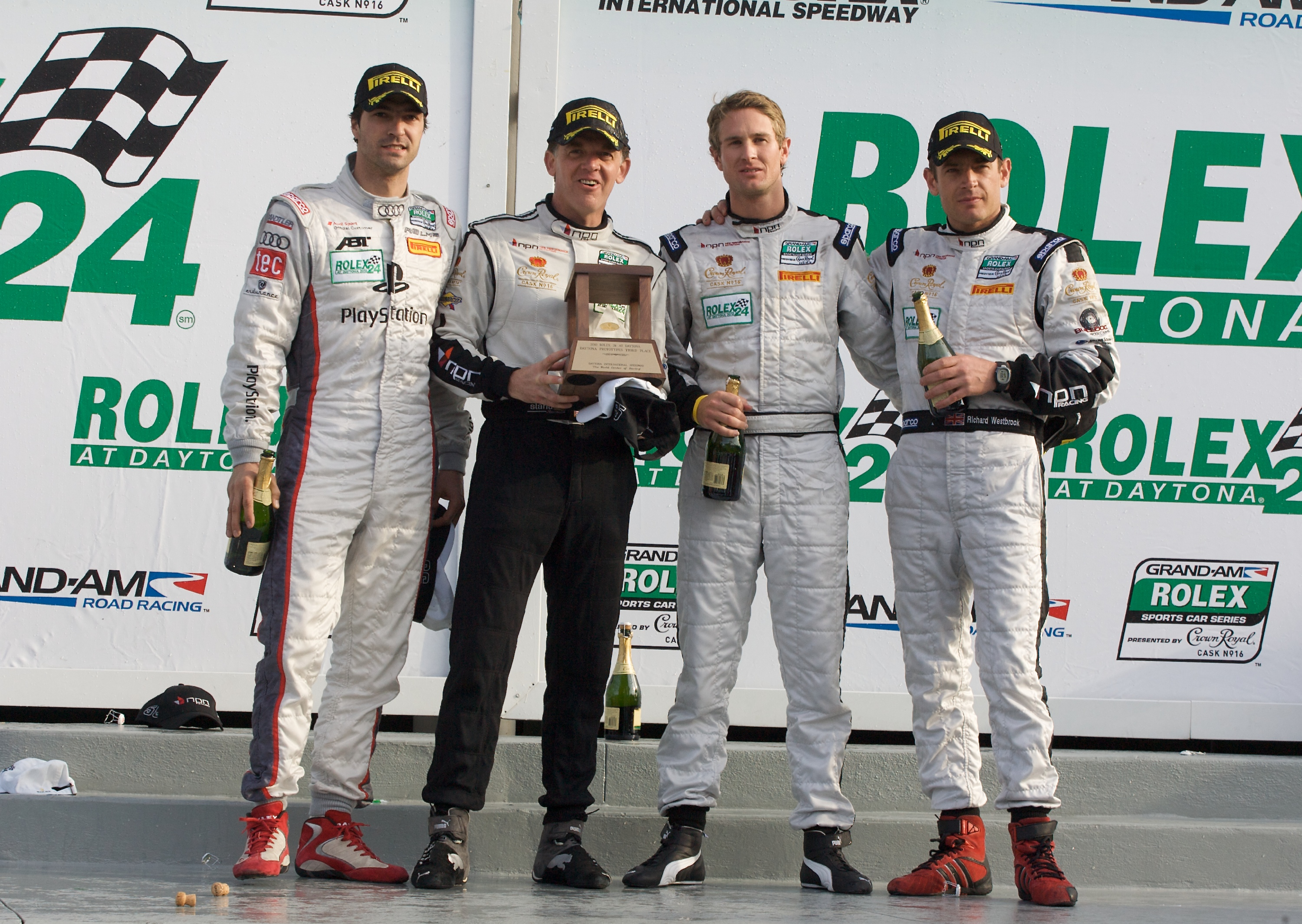
Hunter-Reay with his co-drivers at the 2010 Rolex 24 at Daytona.

Hunter-Reay began to compete in the Rolex Grand-Am Sports Car Series in 2006 for SAMAX/Doncaster Racing in the No. 17 SAMAX/Doncaster Racing Porsche GT3 Cup in the GT class in three races. At both the U.S Sportscar Invitational at Mazda Raceway Laguna Seca and The GAINSCO Grand Prix at Phoenix International Raceway, Hunter-Reay's co-driver was Ian James and the Rolex GT Series Challenge at Lime Rock Park with Mark Greenburg. At Laguna Seca, the car started in 32nd place overall and in fourth place in class. The car completed 86 laps to finish in 23rd place overall and in third place in its class. At Phoenix the car started in 26th place overall and in third place in its class. The car retired after 91 laps to finish in 33rd place overall twelfth place in its class. At Lime Rock, the field consisted only of GT cars and Hunter-Reay started in eighteenth place and retired after eleven laps and finished in eighteenth place. Hunter-Reay then competed in the season-ending Discount Tire Sunchaser 1000K at Miller Motorsports Park for SunTrust Racing in the No. 10 SunTrust Banks Riley-Pontiac with Wayne Taylor and Max Angelelli in the DP class. The car started in fifth place both overall and in its class. The car completed 186 laps to finish in 14th place both overall and in its class. Hunter-Reay also finished 27th in the GT drivers standings with 107 points while the No. 17 SAMAX/Doncaster Racing entry finished fourth in the GT teams championship with 392 points. Hunter-Reay finished 97th in the DP driver's standings with seventeen points while the #10 SunTrust Racing entry finished 3rd in the DP teams standings with 431 points.

In 2007 Hunter-Reay began to drive the No. 91 Riley MkXI-Pontiac 5.0L V8 for Riley-Matthews Motorsports in the DP class. At the season-opening Rolex 24 at Daytona Hunter-Reay co-drove with Jim Matthews, Marc Goossens and Jimmie Johnson. The car was sponsored at the race by Lowe's (who was the sponsor of Johnson's #48 Hendrick Motorsports Chevrolet Monte Carlo SS in the NASCAR Nextel Cup Series). The car started in third place both overall and in class. The car completed 560 laps due to an engine failure. The car finished in 36th place overall and in nineteenth place in class. Hunter-Reay drove the car in three other races, all without sponsorship. At the Sahlen's Six Hours of the Glen at Watkins Glen International Hunter-Reay co-drove with Matthews and Goossens. The car started in fifteenth place both overall and in its class. The car completed 167 laps to finish in sixth place both overall and in its class. At the Emco Gears Classic at Mid-Ohio Sports Car Course Hunter-Reay drove with the same drivers to start in seventeenth place (the race only had DP class cars). The car completed 125 laps to finish in eleventh place. Hunter-Reay returned to the series at the season-ending Discount Tire Sunchaser 1000 at Miller Motorsports Park Hunter-Reay drove with the same drivers to start in nineteenth place both overall and in its class. The car led for twenty laps and completed 139 laps to win the race both overall and in its class. Hunter-Reay finished 36th in the DP drivers standings with 92 points. The No. 91 Riley-Matthews Motorsports entry would finish ninth in the DP teams championship with 298 points.

For 2008, Riley-Matthews Motorsports and GAINSCO/Bob Stallings Racing ran the No. 91 Riley MkXI-Pontiac 5.0L V8 without sponsorship. At the season-opening Rolex 24 at Daytona, Hunter-Reay co-drove with Jim Matthews, Johnny O'Connell and Marc Goossens in the DP class. The car started in 3rd place both overall and in its class. The car completed 676 laps to finish in 8th place both overall and in its class. Hunter-Reay returned to the car for the season-ending SunRichGourmet.com 1000 at Miller Motorsports Park as a co-driver to Matthews and Goossens. The car started in thirteenth place both overall and in its class. The car would finish in seventh place both overall and in its class. Hunter-Reay finished 34th in the DP drivers standings with 47 points. The #91 Riley-Matthews Motorsports and GAINSCO/Bob Stallings Racing entry finished 10th in the DP teams championship with 303 points.

In 2009, Hunter-Reay first drove for Michael Shank Racing in the No. 60 Westfield Insurance Riley Mk. XX-Ford 5.0L V8 at the season-opening Rolex 24 at Daytona in the DP class with Mark Patterson, Oswaldo Negri Jr. and Colin Braun. The car started in tenth place both overall and in its class. The car completed 262 laps before having electrical problems. The car would retire to finish in 41st place overall and in 16th place in class. Hunter-Reay returned to the series for the season-ending GAINSCO Grand Prix of Miami at Homestead-Miami Speedway in the #95 Edata Solutions/Ecomm Link Riley Mk. XX-BMW 5.0L V8 with Scott Tucker and Christophe Bouchut for Supercar Life Racing and Level 5 Motorsports. The car started in fifth place both overall and in its class and finished in tenth place both overall and in its class after completing all one-hundred laps. The trio of drivers also dove in a second car for Supercar Life Racing and Level 5 Motorsports, the #55 Edata Solutions/Ecomm Link Riley Mk. XX-BMW 5.0L V8. The car started in twelfth place both overall and in its class. The car finished in sixth place both overall and in its class. Hunter-Reay's results in the No. 55 car were not counted towards the championship. Hunter-Reay finished 34th in the DP drivers championship with 36 points. The #60 Michael Shank Racing entry finished ninth in the DP teams championship with 270 points. The No. 55 Supercar Life Racing and Level 5 Motorsports entry finished thirteenth in the DP teams championship with 195 points. The #95 Supercar Life Racing and Level 5 Motorsports entry finished 22nd in the DP teams championship with 22 points.

In 2010, Hunter-Reay drove for Level 5 Motorsports in the No. 95 Crown Royal Cask No. 16 Riley Mk. XI-BMW 5.0L V8 in the DP class. At the season-ending Rolex 24 at Daytona Hunter-Reay co-drove with Christophe Bouchut, Lucas Luhr, Scott Tucker and Richard Westbrook. The car started in thirteenth place both overall and in its class. The car would lead for eleven laps and would finish in third place both overall and in its class with 751 laps. Hunter-Reay then drove at the second race of the season, the Grand Prix of Miami at Homestead-Miami Speedway, in the same car, with additional sponsorship from US Bank, Spirit Jets, Drive Digital Medi and Supercar Life. Hunter-Reay would co-drive with Tucker. The car started in sixth place both overall and in its class. The car completed 120 laps to finish in nineteenth place overall and in fourteenth place in its class. Hunter-Reay would finish 23rd in the DP drivers championship with 47 points. The No. 95 Level 5 Motorsports entry would finish fourteenth in the DP teams championship with 47 points.

For 2011, Hunter-Reay only competed in the Rolex 24 of Daytona for Level 5 Motorsports in the No. 95 Microsoft/E-Data Solutions/Selling Source/US Bank Riley Mk XXII-BMW 5.0L V8 in the DP class with Scott Tucker, Richard Westbrook and Raphael Matos. The car started in seventeenth place both overall and in its class. The car would complete 703 laps to finish in eleventh place both overall and in its class. Hunter-Reay finished 33rd in the DP drivers championship with twenty points. The No. 95 Level 5 Motorsports entry finished twentieth in the DP teams championship with twenty points.

In 2012, Hunter-Reay only competed in the Rolex 24 at Daytona for Starworks Motorsport in the DP class in the No. 2 Motorola Riley Mk. XX-Ford 5.0L V8 with Marco Andretti, Scott Mayer and Michael Valiante. The car started in ninth place both overall and in its class. The car completed 736 laps to finish in tenth place both overall and in its class. Hunter-Reay would finish 36th in the DP drivers championship with ten points. The No. 2 Starworks Motorsport entry finished ninth in the DP teams championship with 333 points.

In 2013, Hunter-Reay only competed in the Rolex 24 of Daytona for VelocityWW in the DP class in the No. 10 Velocity Worldwide Dallara Corvette DP-Chevrolet 5.0L V8 with Max Angelelli and Jordan Taylor. The car started in twelfth place both overall and in its class. The car led for 56 laps and completed 709 laps to finish in second place both overall and in its class. Hunter-Reay finished 33rd in the DP drivers championship. The No. 10 VelocityWW entry finished second in the DP teams championship with 339 points.

==== IMSA Tudor United SportsCar Championship ====
Hunter-Reay began to compete in the IMSA Tudor United SportsCar Championship after the American Le Mans Series and the Rolex Grand-Am Sports Car Series merged in 2013. Hunter-Reay would drive for SRT Motorsports in the No. 91 Street and Racing Technology SRT Viper GTS-R-SRT 8.0 L V10 in the GTLM class. At the season-opening Rolex 24 at Daytona, Hunter-Reay co-drove with Dominik Farnbacher and Marc Goossens. The car would qualify on the pole position in its class and in 24th place overall. The car would complete 675 laps to finish in third place in its class and in twelfth place in its class. Hunter-Reay then competed in the second race of the season, the 12 Hours of Sebring. Hunter-Reay drove the same car with the same co-drivers from Daytona. The car started in tenth place in its class and in 35th place overall. The car would complete 284 laps to finish in seventh place in its class and in eighteenth place overall. Hunter-Reay would compete in the season-ending Petit Le Mans in the same car with Kuno Wittmer and Goosens. The car would start in 26th place and would finish in eleventh place overall with 392 laps complete. The car would finish in third place in its class. Hunter-Reay would finish in nineteenth place in the GTLM drivers championship with 87 points. The No. 91 SRT Motorsports entry would finish in third place in the GTLM teams championship with 314 points.

=== Race of Champions ===
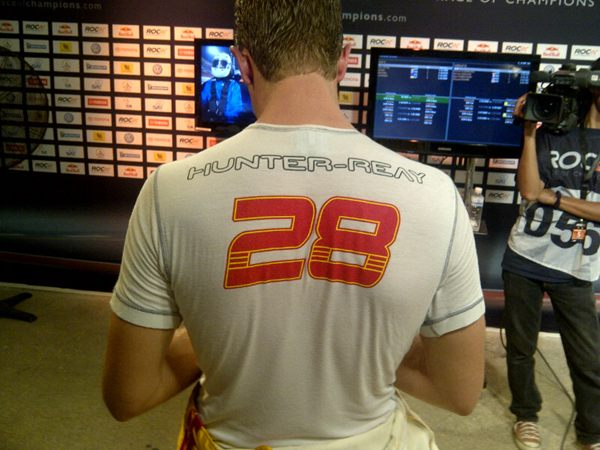
Hunter-Reay prior to the 2012 Race of Champions.

Hunter-Reay was invited to compete in the Race of Champions in 2012. Hunter-Reay was the only driver to compete to represent the IndyCar Series and would be the first driver since Bertrand Baguette in 2010 to represent the series. Hunter-Reay was part of the Americas team with Mexican driver Benito Guerra Jr. In the Group A races of the Nations Cup Hunter-Reay would have one win and two losses while Guerra would have two wins and one loss. The team's first race was against the All-Stars team. In Hunter-Reay's first race he raced against Tom Kristensen and the two each raced in Volkswagen Sciroccos. Kristensen would win the race with a time of one minute and 23.0759 seconds compared to Hunter-Reay's time of 1 minute and 24.5635 seconds. Guerra would win in his race against Jorge Lorenzo. The team's next race came against the Great Britain team. Hunter-Reay would compete against David Coulthard and the two each raced in KTM X-Bows. Hunter-Reay would win the race with a time of one minute and 19.1336 seconds compared to Coulthard's time of one minute and 16.2360 seconds, which had 5 seconds added to it due Coulthard making a false start. Guerra lost in his race against Andy Priaulx. The team's third and final race in Group A was against the France team. Hunter-Reay would race against Romain Grosjean and the two each raced in Audi R8 LMSes. Grosjean would beat Hunter-Reay in the race with a time of one minute and 16.5117 seconds compared to Hunter-Reay's time of one minute and 18.5096 seconds, which had five seconds added to it due to Hunter-Reay making a false start. Guerra would win in his race against Sébastien Ogier. The team would finish in third place in the Group A results behind the France and All-Stars teams. The team would fail to qualify for the semifinals. In the Race of Champions races Hunter-Reay would compete in Group D. In Hunter-Reay's first race, he competed against Kazuya Oshima and the two each raced in KTM X-Bows. In the race Hunter-Reay won with a time of one minute and 17.0206 seconds compared to Oshima's time of one minute and 22.5314 seconds, which had five seconds added to it due to Oshima making a false start. In Hunter-Reay's second race, he competed against Grosjean and each raced in ROC Cars. In the race Grosjean won with a time of one minute and 19.3890 seconds compared to Hunter-Reay's time of one minute and 26.2154 seconds, which five seconds added to it due to Hunter-Reay making a false start. In Hunter-Reay's final race in Group D he competed against Michael Schumacher and each raced in Euro Racecars. In the race, Schumacher won the race with a time of one minute and 17.8680 seconds compared to Hunter-Reay's time of one minute and 25.2427 seconds, which had five seconds added to it due to Hunter-Reay making a false start. Hunter-Reay would finish in third place in the Group D standings with one win and two losses, finishing behind Schumacher and Grosjean. Hunter-Reay would fail to qualify for the quarterfinals.

Hunter-Reay would return to the races in 2014 and would be the only representative of the Verizon IndyCar Series. In the team events Kurt Busch would be Hunter-Reay's teammate. Busch had been Hunter-Reay's teammate at Andretti Autosport for the 2014 Indianapolis 500.

=== Leadership and Management ===
In June of 2026 Hunter-Reay was announced as the Sporting Director of Arrow McLaren, with Tony Kanaan citing his racing career and overall attitude as driving factors behind the decision.

== Personal life ==
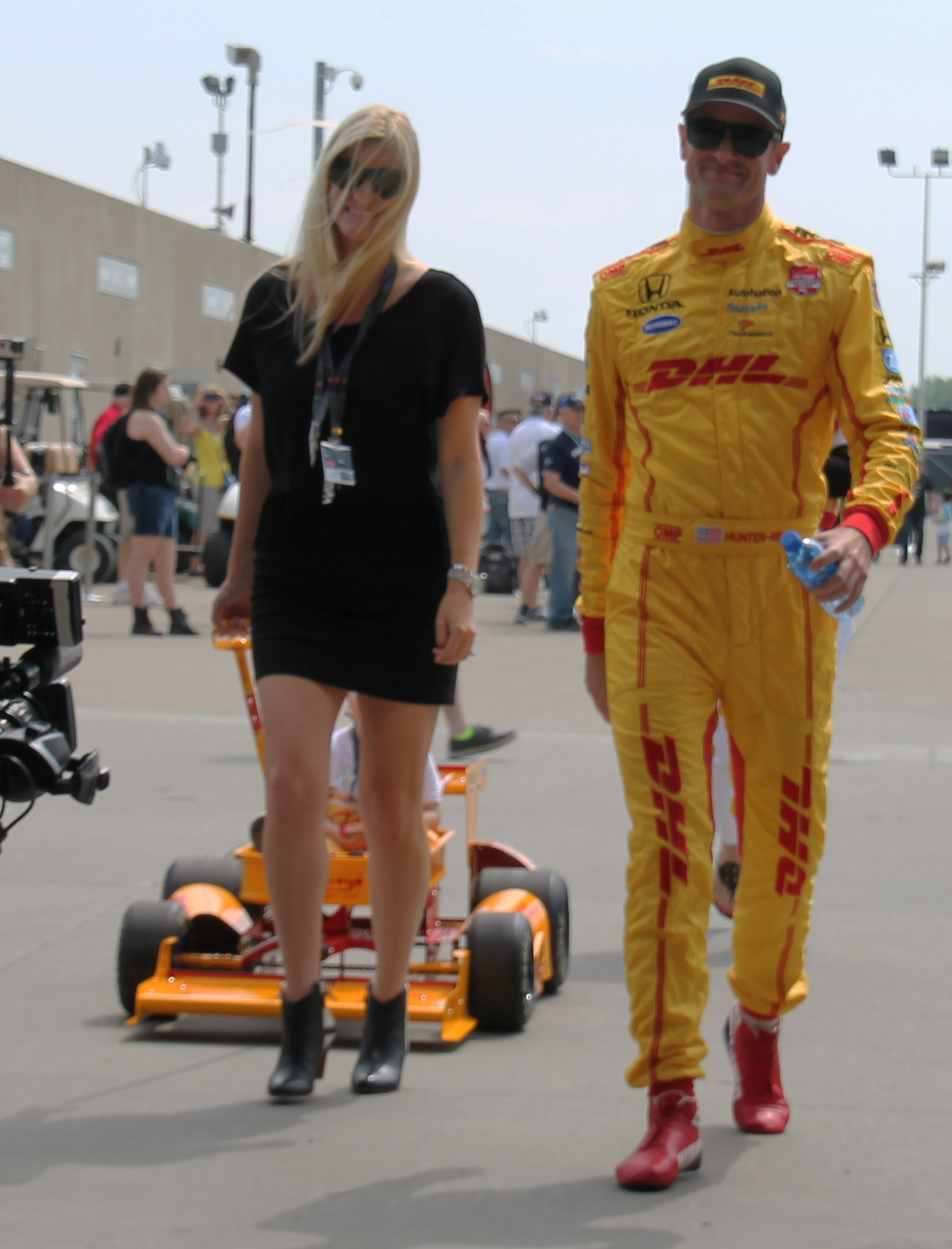
Hunter-Reay with his wife, Beccy Gordon

=== Marriage ===
Hunter-Reay is married to former Champ Car World Series pit reporter and off-road racing driver, Beccy Gordon, sister of former Champ Car, NASCAR Sprint Cup Series, and IndyCar Series driver and car owner Robby Gordon. Hunter-Reay has three children.

=== Number 28 ===
Since the 2011 season up until the 2021 season, Hunter-Reay's car number was the number 28. The number 28 was meant to represent the estimated 28 million people that live with cancer. In 2009, Hunter-Reay's mother died of colon cancer. During the 2013 season, Hunter-Reay, as the defending series champion, used number 1 as his car number. This would be the first time that a defending champion has used #1 in the IndyCar Series since Scott Dixon in 2004 (although Michael Andretti did use #1 in a one-off race during the 2006 season at the Indianapolis 500 due to the team winning the championship the previous season with Dan Wheldon). During the 2013 season a small 28 was placed inside of the 1.

=== Other ===
Hunter-Reay currently resides in Fort Lauderdale, Florida. He fishes in his spare time, stating "it's a great escape from anything". He owns a Yellowfin Yachts 42-foot yacht named Inside Line which he uses on his fishing trips.

== Media appearances ==
=== Television and film ===
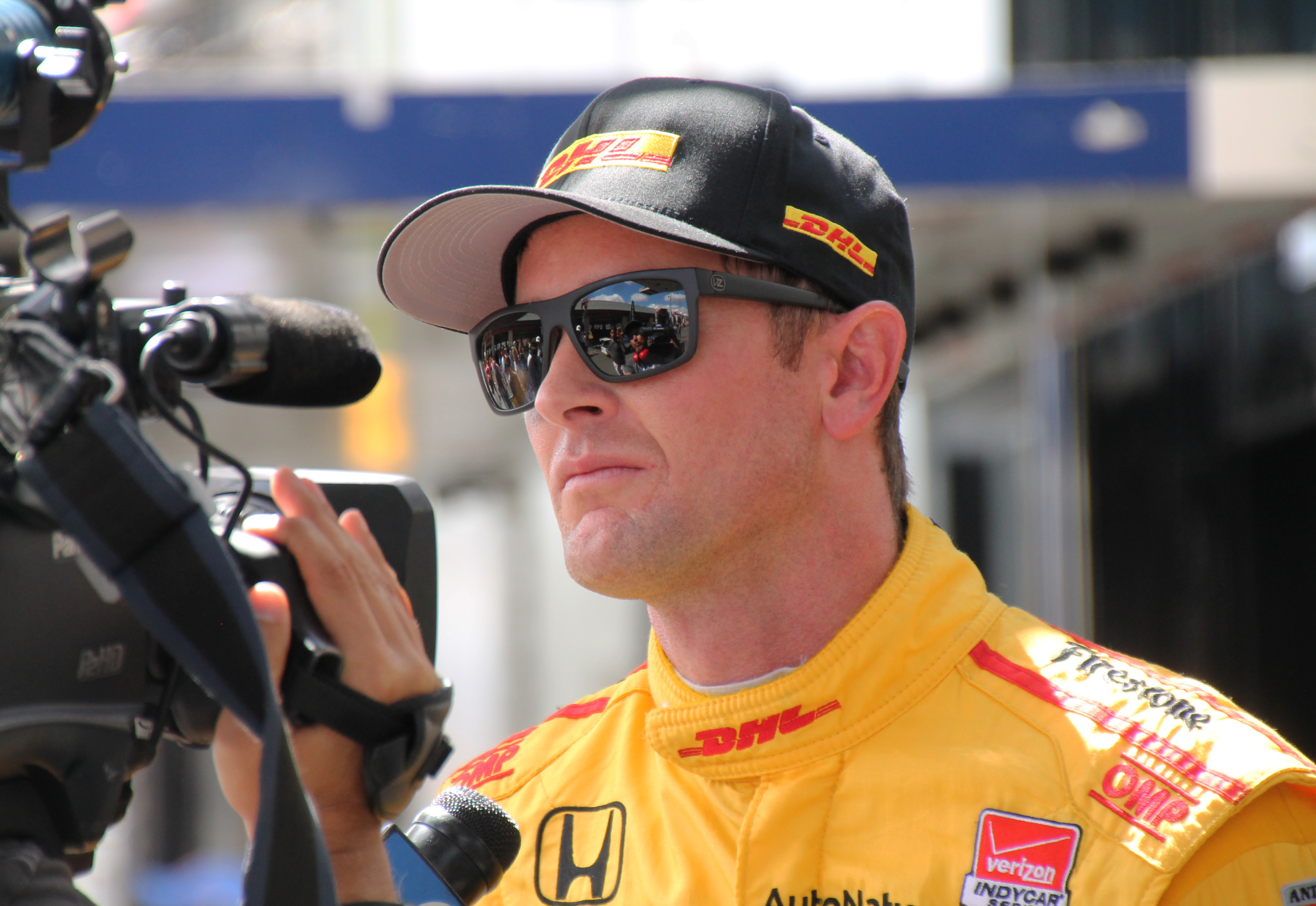
Hunter-Reay being interviewed by NBC Sports in 2015

Hunter-Reay was featured on the NBC Sports Network television series IndyCar 36. The episode was about Hunter-Reay's race weekend at the 2012 Toyota Grand Prix of Long Beach on the Streets of Long Beach. The episode was broadcast prior to the 2012 São Paulo Indy 300 on the Streets of São Paulo, where Hunter-Reay finished in 2nd place to Will Power, on April 29, 2012.

After Hunter-Reay won the 2012, championship a documentary was filmed, titled Ryan Hunter-Reay: An American Champion, that showed Hunter-Reay, his wife Beccy, and newborn son Ryden in the months after Hunter-Reay won the 2012 series championship. The film was broadcast on the NBC Sports Network.

== Racing record ==
=== American open–wheel racing results ===
==== Barber Dodge Pro Series ====
(key) (Races in bold indicate pole position)

Year	1	2	3	4	5	6	7	8	9	10	11	12	Rank	Points
1998	SEB	LRP	DET	WGI	CLE	GRA	MOH; 23	ROA	LS1	ATL	HMS; 22	LS2	40th	-
2000	SEB; 8	MIA; 8	NAZ; 2	LRP; 4	DET; 24	CLE; 9	MOH; 6	ROA; 3	**VAN**; 8	LS; 5	RAT; 10	HMS; 7	5th	104
2001	SEB; 2	PIR; 9	LRP1; 1	LRP2; 2	DET; 15	CLE; 19	TOR; 1	CHI; 20	MOH; 4	ROA; 9	VAN; 3	LS; 18	5th	114

==== Atlantic Championship ====
(key) (Races in bold indicate pole position)

Year	Team	1	2	3	4	5	6	7	8	9	10	11	12	Rank	Points
2002	Hylton Motorsports	MTY; Ret	LBH; 18	**MIL**; Ret	**LS**; 1	POR; 4	CHI; 1	TOR; 4	**CLE**; 1	TRR; 7	ROA; Ret	MTL; 22	DEN; Ret	6th	102

==== Champ Car World Series ====
(key) (Races in bold indicate pole position)

Year	Team	No.	Chassis	Engine	1	2	3	4	5	6	7	8	9	10	11	12	13	14	15	16	17	18	19	Rank	Points	Ref
2003	American Spirit Team Johansson	31	Reynard 02i	Ford Cosworth XFE	STP; 16	MTY; 12	LBH; 7	BRH; 16	LAU; 11	MIL; 16	LS; 12	POR; 17	CLE; 9	TOR; 11	VAN; 6	ROA; 10	MOH; 3	MTL; 17	DEN; 15	MIA; 12	MXC; 11	SRF; 1	FON; NH	14th	64	
2004	Herdez Competition	4	Lola B02/00	Ford Cosworth XFE	LBH; 7	MTY; 8	**MIL**; 1*	POR; 12	CLE; 11	TOR; 8	VAN; 8	ROA; 4	DEN; 16	MTL; 18	LS; 5	LVS; 13	SRF; 5	MXC; 19						9th	199^{^}	
2005	Rocketsports Racing	31	Lola B02/00	Ford Cosworth XFE	LBH; 13	MTY; 7	MIL; 17	POR; 15	CLE; 18	TOR; 6	EDM; 16	SJO; 14	DEN; 6	MTL; 12	LVS; 10	SRF	MXC							15th	110	

^{^} New points system implemented in 2004.

Years	Teams	Races	Poles	Wins	Podiums (Non-win)	Top 10s (Non-podium)	Championships
4	3	43	1	2	1	15	0

==== IndyCar Series ====
(key) (Races in bold indicate pole position)

Year	Team	No.	Chassis	Engine	1	2	3	4	5	6	7	8	9	10	11	12	13	14	15	16	17	18	19	Rank	Points	Ref
2007	Rahal Letterman Racing	17	Dallara IR05	Honda	HMS	STP	MOT	KAN	INDY	MIL	TXS	IOW	RIR	WGL	NSH	MOH; 7	MIS; 6	KTY; 15	SNM; 18	DET; 18	CHI; 7			19th	119	
2008	Rahal Letterman Racing	17	Dallara IR05	Honda	HMS; 7	STP; 17	MOT; 7	LBH; DNP	KAN; 18	INDY; 6	MIL; 15	TXS; 20	IOW; 8	RIR; 16	WGL; 1	NSH; 19	MOH; 10	EDM; 8	KTY; 9	SNM; 18	DET; 6	CHI; 9		8th	360	
2009	Vision Racing	21	Dallara IR05	Honda	STP; 2	LBH; 11	KAN; 15	INDY; 32	MIL; 12	TXS; 16														15th	298	
2009	A. J. Foyt Enterprises	14	Dallara IR05	Honda							IOW; 19	RIR; 15	WGL; 21	TOR; 7	EDM; 17	KTY; 14	MOH; 4	SNM; 19	CHI; 15	MOT; 21	HMS; 13			15th	298	
2010	Andretti Autosport	37	Dallara IR05	Honda	SAO; 2	STP; 11	ALA; 12	LBH; 1	KAN; 5	INDY; 18	TXS; 7	IOW; 8	WGL; 7	TOR; 3	EDM; 5	MOH; 10	SNM; 8	CHI; 4	KTY; 21	MOT; 9	HMS; 11			7th	445	
2011	Andretti Autosport	28	Dallara IR05	Honda	STP; 21	ALA; 14	LBH; 23	SAO; 18	INDY; DNQ	TXS; 19	TXS; 9	MIL; 26	IOW; 8	TOR; 3	EDM; 7	MOH; 3	NHM; 1	SNM; 10	BAL; 8	MOT; 24	KTY; 5	LVS^{1} C		7th	347	
2011	A. J. Foyt Enterprises	41	Dallara IR05	Honda					INDY; 23															7th	347	
2012	Andretti Autosport	28	Dallara DW12	Chevrolet	STP; 3	ALA; 12	LBH; 6	SAO; 2	INDY; 27	DET; 7	TXS; 21	MIL; 1	IOW; 1	TOR; 1	**EDM**; 7	MOH; 24	SNM; 18	BAL; 1	FON; 4					1st	468	
2013	Andretti Autosport	1	Dallara DW12	Chevrolet	STP; 18	**ALA**; 1	LBH; 24	**SAO**; 11	INDY; 3	DET; 2	DET; 18	TXS; 2	MIL; 1	IOW; 2	POC; 20	TOR; 18	TOR; 19	**MOH**; 5	SNM; 6	BAL; 20	HOU; 20	HOU; 21	FON; 9	7th	469	
2014	Andretti Autosport	28	Dallara DW12	Honda	STP; 2	**LBH**; 20	ALA; 1	IMS; 2	INDY; 1	DET; 16	DET; 19	TXS; 19	HOU; 7	HOU; 6	POC; 18	IOW; 1	TOR; 21	TOR; 14	MOH; 10	MIL; 21	SNM; 2	FON; 16		6th	563	
2015	Andretti Autosport	28	Dallara DW12	Honda	STP; 7	NLA; 19	LBH; 13	ALA; 5	IMS; 11	INDY; 15	DET; 13	DET; 8	TXS; 18	TOR; 19	FON; 16	MIL; 13	IOW; 1	MOH; 7	POC; 1	SNM; 2				6th	436	
2016	Andretti Autosport	28	Dallara DW12	Honda	STP; 3	PHX; 10	LBH; 18	ALA; 11	IMS; 9	INDY; 24	DET; 7	DET; 3	RDA; 4	IOW; 22	TOR; 12	MOH; 18	POC; 3	TXS; 13	WGL; 14	SNM; 4				12th	428	
2017	Andretti Autosport	28	Dallara DW12	Honda	STP; 4	LBH; 17	ALA; 11	PHX; 13	IMS; 3	INDY; 27	DET; 13	DET; 17	TXS; 19	ROA; 14	IOW; 3	TOR; 6	MOH; 8	POC; 8	GTW; 15	WGL; 3	SNM; 8			9th	421	
2018	Andretti Autosport	28	Dallara DW12	Honda	STP; 5	PHX; 5	LBH; 20	ALA; 2	IMS; 18	INDY; 5	DET; 2	DET; 1	TXS; 5	ROA; 2	IOW; 19	TOR; 16	MOH; 7	POC; 18	GTW; 20	POR; 2	**SNM**; 1			4th	566	
2019	Andretti Autosport	28	Dallara DW12	Honda	STP; 23	COA; 3	ALA; 8	LBH; 5	IMS; 17	INDY; 8	DET; 5	DET; 4	TXS; 5	ROA; 11	TOR; 16	IOW; 17	MOH; 3	POC; 19	GTW; 8	POR; 18	LAG; 10			8th	420	
2020	Andretti Autosport	28	Dallara DW12	Honda	TXS; 8	IMS; 13	ROA; 4	ROA; 22	IOW; 16	IOW; 22	INDY; 10	GTW; 7	GTW; 11	MOH; 5	MOH; 3	IMS; 19	IMS; 16	STP; 5						10th	315	
2021	Andretti Autosport	28	Dallara DW12	Honda	ALA; 24	STP; 14	TXS; 16	TXS; 10	IMS; 12	INDY; 22	DET; 21	DET; 11	ROA; 13	MOH; 24	NSH; 4	IMS; 18	GTW; 7	POR; 15	LAG; 11	LBH; 23				17th	256	
2023	Dreyer & Reinbold Racing	23	Dallara DW12	Chevrolet	STP	TXS	LBH	ALA	IMS	INDY; 11	DET													26th	131	
2023	Ed Carpenter Racing	20	Dallara DW12	Chevrolet								ROA; 17	MOH; 19	TOR; 26	IOW; 23	IOW; 24	NSH; 16	IMS; 20	GTW; 14	POR; 21	LAG; 10			26th	131	
2024	Dreyer & Reinbold Racing with Cusick Motorsports	23	Dallara DW12	Chevrolet	STP	THE	LBH	ALA	IMS	INDY; 26	DET	ROA	LAG	MOH	IOW	IOW	TOR	GTW	POR	MIL	MIL	NSH		42nd	6	
2025	Dreyer & Reinbold Racing with Cusick Motorsports	23	Dallara DW12	Chevrolet	STP	THE	LBH	ALA	IMS	INDY; 21	DET	GTW	ROA	MOH	IOW	IOW	TOR	LAG	POR	MIL	NSH			32nd	10	
2026	Arrow McLaren	31	Dallara DW12	Chevrolet	STP	PHX	ARL	ALA	LBH	IMS	INDY; 32	DET	GTW	ROA	MOH	NSH	POR	MRK	WSH	MIL	MIL	LAG		32nd	5	

* Season still in progress.

- ^{1} The Las Vegas Indy 300 was abandoned after Dan Wheldon died from injuries sustained in a 15-car crash on lap 11.

Years	Teams	Races	Poles	Wins	Top 5s	Top 10s	Indianapolis 500 Wins	Championships
17	4	252	6	16	72	138	1	1 (2012)

==== Indianapolis 500 ====
Year	Chassis	Engine	Start	Finish	Team
2008	Dallara	Honda	20	6	Rahal Letterman Racing
2009	Dallara	Honda	32	32	Vision Racing
2010	Dallara	Honda	17	18	Andretti Autosport
2011	Dallara	Honda	DNQ		Andretti Autosport
2011	Dallara	Honda	33	23	A. J. Foyt Enterprises
2012	Dallara	Chevrolet	3	27	Andretti Autosport
2013	Dallara	Chevrolet	7	3	Andretti Autosport
2014	Dallara	Honda	19	**1**	Andretti Autosport
2015	Dallara	Honda	16	15	Andretti Autosport
2016	Dallara	Honda	3	24	Andretti Autosport
2017	Dallara	Honda	10	27	Andretti Autosport
2018	Dallara	Honda	14	5	Andretti Autosport
2019	Dallara	Honda	22	8	Andretti Autosport
2020	Dallara	Honda	5	10	Andretti Autosport
2021	Dallara	Honda	7	22	Andretti Autosport
2023	Dallara	Chevrolet	18	11	Dreyer & Reinbold Racing
2024	Dallara	Chevrolet	12	26	Dreyer & Reinbold Racing w/ Cusick Motorsports
2025	Dallara	Chevrolet	25	21	Dreyer & Reinbold Racing w/ Cusick Motorsports
2026	Dallara	Chevrolet	22	32	Arrow McLaren

=== IMSA SportsCar Championship ===
Year	Entrant	No.	Class	Chassis	Engine	1	2	3	4	5	6	7	8	9	10	11	12	Rank	Points
2014	SRT Motorsports		GTLM	SRT Viper GTS-R	Dodge 8.0 L V10	DAY; 3	SEB; 7	LBH	LGA	WGL	MOS	IMS	ELK	VIR	COA	ATL; 3		19th	87
2015	Starworks Motorsport	7	P	Riley Mk XXVI DP	Dinan (BMW) 5.0 L V8	DAY; 9	SEB	LBH	LGA	DET	WGL	MOS	ELK	COA	PET			30th	23
2016	Visit Florida Racing	90	P	Coyotte Corvette DP	Chevrolet 5.5L V8	DAY; 3	SEB; 5	LBH; 6	LGA	DET	WGL	MOS	ELK	COA	PET; 7			15th	109
2017	Michael Shank Racing with Curb-Agajanian		GTD	Acura NSX GT3	Acura 3.5 L Turbo V6	DAY; 5	SEB	LBH	COA	DET	WGL	MOS	LIM	ELK	VIR	LGA		59th	26
2017	Wayne Taylor Racing	10	P	Cadillac DPi-V.R	Cadillac 6.2 L V8												PET; 9	38th	24
2018	Wayne Taylor Racing	10	P	Cadillac DPi-V.R	Cadillac 5.5 L V8	DAY; 15	SEB; 2	LBH	MOH	DET	WGL	MOS	ELK	LGA	PET; 1			26th	83
2019	Mazda Team Joest	55	DPi	Mazda RT24-P	Mazda MZ-2.0T 2.0 L Turbo I4	DAY	SEB	LBH	MOH; 3	DET	WGL	MOS	ELK	LGA	PET			29th	30
2020	Mazda Team Joest	55	DPi	Mazda RT24-P	Mazda MZ-2.0T 2.0 L Turbo I4	DAY; 6	DAY	SEB	ELK									12th	117
2020	Mazda Motorsports	55	DPi	Mazda RT24-P	Mazda MZ-2.0T 2.0 L Turbo I4					ATL; 2	MOH	PET; 6	LGA	SEB; 1				12th	117
2022	Cadillac Racing	01/02	DPi	Cadillac DPi-V.R	Cadillac 5.5 L V8	DAY	**SEB**; 7	LBH	LGA	MOH	DET	WGL	MOS	ELK	PET; 5			16th	567

=== Superstar Racing Experience ===
(key) * – Most laps led. ^{1} – Heat 1 winner. ^{2} – Heat 2 winner.

Superstar Racing Experience results
Year	No.	1	2	3	4	5	6	SRXC	Pts
2022	28	FIF; 8	SBO; 9	STA; 7^{1}	NSV; 10	I55; 13	SHA; 4	7th	118

Sporting positions
Preceded by Dario Franchitti	IndyCar Series Champion; 2012	Succeeded by Scott Dixon
Achievements
Preceded by Tony Kanaan	Indianapolis 500 Winner; 2014	Succeeded by Juan Pablo Montoya
Awards
Preceded by Marco Andretti	IndyCar Series Rookie of the Year; 2007	Succeeded by Hideki Mutoh
Preceded by Phil Giebler	Indianapolis 500 Rookie of the Year; 2008	Succeeded by Alex Tagliani
Preceded by Tony Stewart	Best Driver ESPY Award; 2013, 2014	Succeeded by Kevin Harvick
