= Zihai Li =

Immuno-Oncology researcher

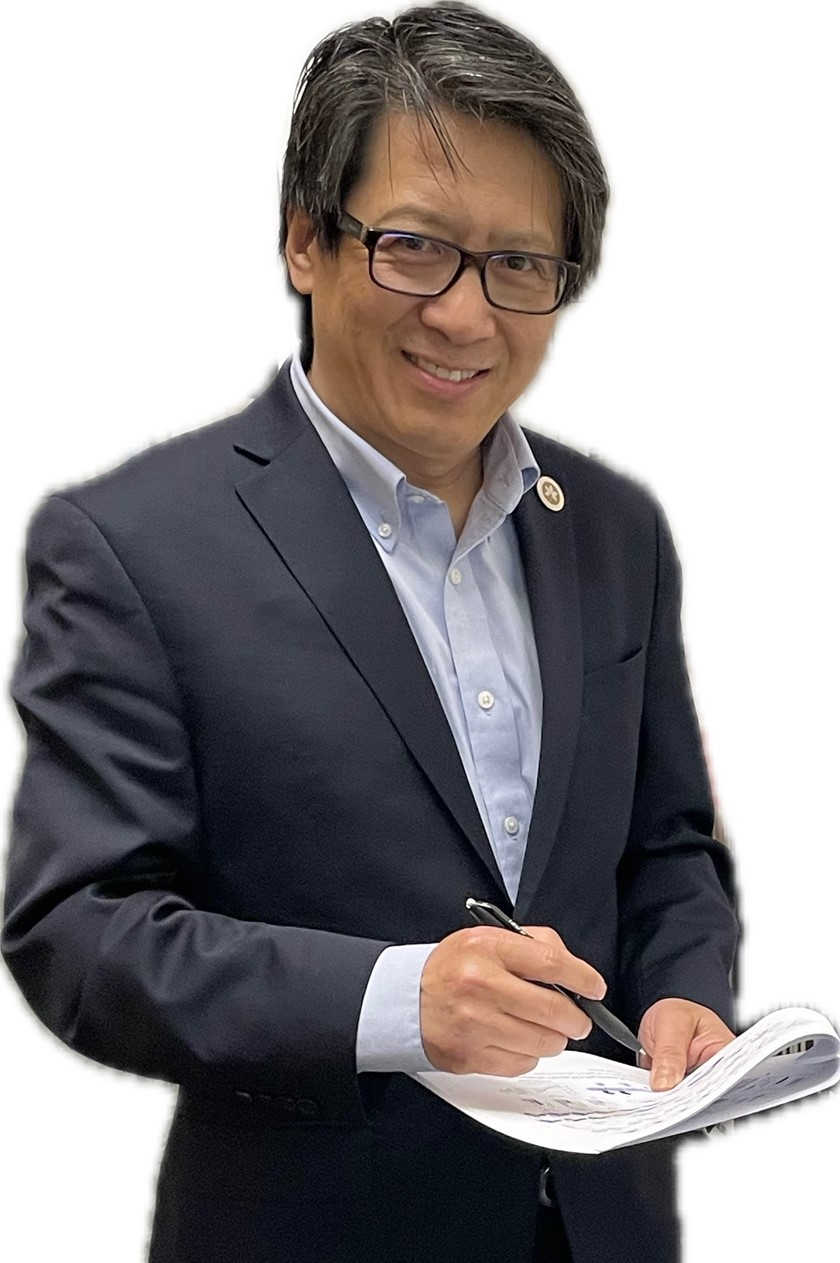

Zihai Li is an American Board of Internal Medicine-certified/eligible medical oncologist, cancer immunologist, and leader in academic medicine. He was recruited to Ohio State University Comprehensive Cancer Center – The James Cancer Hospital & Solove Research Institute (OSUCCC) in 2019 as the founding director of the Pelotonia Institute for Immuno-Oncology. He is a professor of medicine in the Division of Medical Oncology, holds the Klotz Memorial Chair for Cancer Research, and was appointed in 2023 as deputy director for translational research at OSUCCC.

Li's research interests primarily focus on the fields of proteostasis, chaperone biology, immune tolerance, cancer immunology and immunotherapy. He has been continuously funded by the National Institutes of Health (NIH) since 2000, with total funding of over $30 million.

== Career ==
Following his residency and fellowship, Li began his first joint faculty appointment in the Department of Immunology and Medicine at the University of Connecticut School of Medicine (Farmington, CT). In 2010, he was recruited to the Department of Microbiology and Immunology at the Medical University of South Carolina (MUSC), where he served as chair from 2010-2019. During his tenure as chair, the department doubled its NIH funding and increased its national NIH ranking from 79 to 31. Li was also appointed the leader of the Cancer Immunology Program at MUSC's Hollings Cancer Center (2010-2019). Li was inducted into the American Society of Clinical Investigation (2009) and the Association of American Physicians (2018) and is an elected fellow of the American Association for the Advancement of Science (2021) for his work in the interface of chaperone biology and cancer immunology. Recognizing his history of mentorship, he was awarded the Peggy Schachte Research Mentor Award in 2016 from MUSC. In 2022, he received the Mount Sinai Alumni Award for Achievement in Graduate Education.

== Contributions to science ==
=== Chaperone biology and immune regulation ===
Li has made groundbreaking discoveries studying the immune chaperone gp96 (also called GRP94), an endoplasmic reticulum-resident protein chaperon belonging to the HSP90 family of heat shock proteins. His research revealed that gp96 is pivotal in various physiological processes, including organ development, innate immunity, and immune tolerance. In cancer, gp96 expression is not only abundant but also further upregulated, driving oncogenesis through its growing client network.

Background: In the 1950s, Prehn, Main, Klein, Old, and others demonstrated the existence of protective immunity against cancer in mice using syngeneic tumor models. This was followed by decades of effort to identify tumor rejection antigens. Pramod Srivastava and Lloyd J. Old isolated a ubiquitous conserved protein, gp96, as a tumor rejection antigen from several chemically induced fibrosarcoma models.

Major contribution to gp96/GRP94 biology: Li defined the ATPase activity of gp96/GRP94, its client network, its structure-function relationship, and the co-chaperone CNPY3. Furthermore, he established its roles in immunity, hematopoiesis, and cancer. gp96/GRP94 was identified as a major luminal protein of the endoplasmic reticulum in multicellular organisms (not in yeast), inducible by metabolic stress. However, there were no previous publications regarding the function of gp96/GRP94 when Li began to study this molecule in the 1990s. It remained unclear how this unmutated protein could trigger an immune response in animals against the tumor from which it originated. Through a biochemical approach, Li was the first to demonstrate that gp96/GRP94 is a bona fide member of the HSP90 family, exhibiting ATP binding, intrinsic ATPase activity, and peptide chaperoning functions. The ability of gp96/GRP94 to form complexes with peptides provided a mechanistic explanation for its antigenicity: it is the chaperoned peptides, rather than gp96/GRP94 itself, that elicit immunogenicity.

However, the physiological role of gp96/GRP94 remained unclear at the time, partly because gp96/GRP94 is absent in yeast, a common genetic model used to study eukaryotic HSPs. Li was the first to use mammalian genetics to uncover the function of GRP94 at the organismal level. He discovered that GRP94 is a major chaperone for integrins,Toll-like receptors (TLRs), Wnt co-receptors LRP5/6, the platelet receptor for the von Willebrand factor, and the latent TGFβ docking receptor GARP (see illustration). gp96/GRP94 thus masterminds three major signals that regulate T cell immunity: antigens, TLRs, and TGFβ.

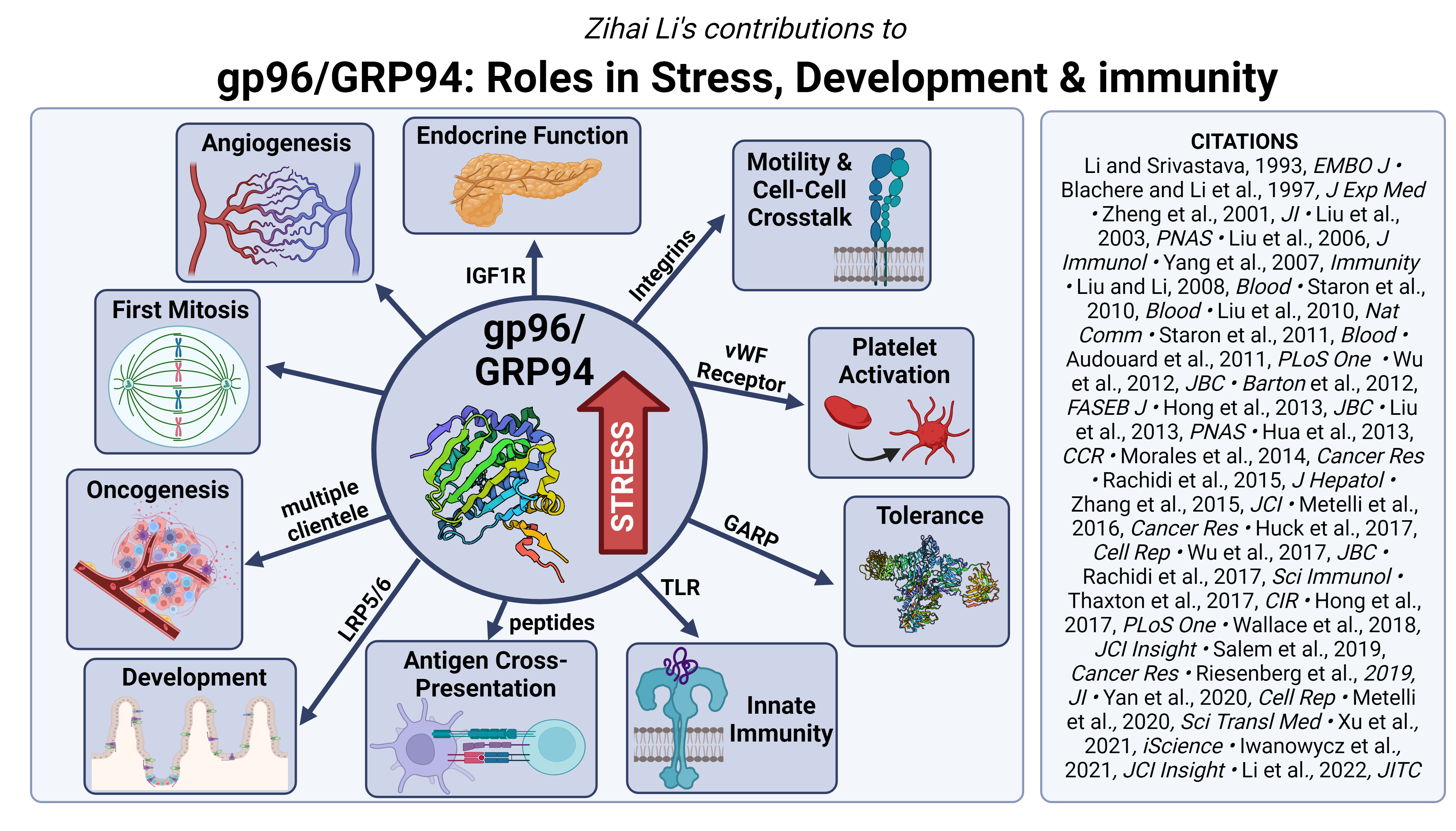
illustration of Zihai Li's Contributions to gp96/GRP94

Li also discovered that co-chaperones regulate gp96/GRP94 substrate specificity. For example, gp96/GRP94 folding of TLRs, LRP5/6, and integrins depends on co-chaperones CNPY3, MesD, and GRP78, respectively. Li's work advanced our understanding of the role of gp96/GRP94 as a key proteostatic switch for controlling innate immunity, immune tolerance, platelet function, and hematopoiesis. Conceptually, it catalyzes the revelation that ancient chaperones have gained specialized function in mammals, opening a new field of developing chaperone-based therapeutics for a variety of diseases. Li coined the term "immune chaperone" to describe this family of molecules.

=== Unraveling Proteostasis Collapse as the Root of T-Cell Exhaustion ===
In 2025, Li and colleagues at The Ohio State University Comprehensive Cancer Center – Arthur G. James Cancer Hospital and Richard J. Solove Research Institute reported a landmark discovery in Nature identifying proteostasis collapse as a key driver of T-cell exhaustion, a major barrier to effective cancer immunotherapy.

Li’s team discovered that exhausted T cells accumulate misfolded proteins that trigger a unique stress response termed the T-cell exhaustion–associated proteotoxic stress response (TexPSR). Unlike classical unfolded protein responses that down-regulate protein synthesis, TexPSR paradoxically amplifies it, causing runaway protein misfolding and the formation of stress granules that cripple immune cell function.

By selectively targeting molecular components of TexPSR, the group demonstrated restoration of T-cell function and enhanced antitumor immunity in preclinical models, revealing an entirely new therapeutic axis—protein quality control in T cells—for improving the durability of immune checkpoint blockade and adoptive cell therapy.

This work provides the first mechanistic link between proteostasis dysregulation and immune exhaustion, positioning Li as a pioneer in integrating protein-folding biology with translational immuno-oncology.

=== Other contributions ===
Li has also made a significant contribution to understanding sex as a biological variable in immune responses. He discovered the T cell-intrinsic roles of androgen receptors in conferring CD8+ T cell exhaustion in cancer. In addition, he contributed to the first report that loss of the Y chromosome in tumor cells causes T cell dysfunction and increased sensitivity to anti-PD-1 immunotherapy. Li's work has been fundamental in establishing the immunological basis of sex bias in cancer.

Li's other contributions to the field of medicine and biology include the discovery of a molecular key from platelets (via GARP) for cancer immune evasion and the first demonstration of CNPY2 as a critical sensor for PERK-mediated unfolded protein response.
