= Pelotonia =

Bike ride fundraiser in Ohio, US

PELOTONIA
- Formation: 2008; 18 years ago in Columbus, Ohio
- Founder: Tom Lennox
- Type: Non-profit
- Location: 2281 Kenny Road, Suite 450, Columbus, Ohio 43210
- Key people: Joe Apgar (CEO); Doug Ulman (Senior Advisor to the CEO)
- Staff: 17 (2023)
- Website: pelotonia.org

Pelotonia is an organization of events, centered around a two-day bicycle ride in the Columbus, Ohio area, to raise funds for cancer research at the Ohio State University Comprehensive Cancer Center – The James. Pelotonia, the Ride, includes a weekend of cycling, entertainment and volunteerism. As a 501(c)(3) not-for-profit organization, Pelotonia facilitates all of riders' and fundraisers' donation money contributing to cancer research, while corporate and philanthropic partners fund the administrative staff and functions.

== History ==
Pelotonia was founded in 2008 as a 501(c)(3) to create a cycling event to raise funds for cancer research. Formerly of the Dana–Farber Cancer Institute, Dr. Mike Caligiuri became CEO of James Cancer Hospital and Solove Research Institute at the start of 2008 and began exploring ways to expand community support and research funding. That summer, Caligiuri and Tom Lennox, cancer survivor and Abercrombie & Fitch executive, rode together in the Pan-Massachusetts Challenge (PMC). The PMC is one of the largest cancer fundraisers in the country and a signature event of Dana-Farber's The Jimmy Fund. Inspired to create a similarly structured event, Lennox left Abercrombie & Fitch that fall and founded Pelotonia.

The inaugural event, Pelotonia 2009 occurred from May 28–30, 2009, with 2,265 riders, including Lance Armstrong. Riders raised over $4.5 million at the end of the fundraising year. NetJets served as the primary sponsor for the 2009 administrative and promotional costs.

The event has continued occurring annually, usually over the first weekend of August.

In 2019, Pelotonia pledged $102,265,000 to found the Pelotonia Institute for Immuno-Oncology within The James. The institute was launched with a five-year plan for talent recruitment, fundraising, publication, and streamlined deployment of immunotherapies in cancer treatment. The institute is led by founding director, Zihai Li, MD PhD.

Since its founding in 2008, Pelotonia has raised more than $258 million.

== The James ==
All money raised for Pelotonia is donated for research at The Ohio State University Comprehensive Cancer Center – James Cancer Hospital and Solove Research Institute (OSUCCC - James), a part of Wexner Medical Center at The Ohio State University. As one of fifty-six hospitals designated a Comprehensive Cancer Center by the National Cancer Institute, The James conducts both phase I and phase II drug trials and other therapeutic and fundamental research.

Pelotonia funds are used to recruit and retain research talent, purchase equipment, fund research for students of all levels through the Pelotonia Fellowship program, and fund two-year faculty teams for treatment and prevention research through the Pelotonia Research Award Program.

The Pelotonia Research Award Program provides grants to scientists for research on better treatments and prevention strategies. By 2014, 108 research teams have received Pelotonia grants.

== Tragedy and controversy ==
During Pelotonia 2010, Michelle Kazlausky, a 57-year-old medical technologist in oncology at Ohio State's University Hospital East from Reynoldsburg, Ohio, was struck and killed by a truck. The truck was driven with faulty brakes on the closed route in Hocking County where Kazlausky was riding towards her 100-mile distance goal. Upon hearing the news, members of the public donated towards Kazlausky's Pelotonia account, surpassing her goal of less than $1,000 to over $28,000. The driver, Ervin Blackston of Rockbridge, Ohio, pleaded guilty to vehicular manslaughter the following spring.

Nearing the end of his third Pelotonia ride, 27-year-old Ohio State medical student Mason Fisher suffered a cardiac event on August 6, 2022. Before he died later that day, his last words were recalled by his mother, a cancer survivor, as "I'll be thinking of you tomorrow, Mom."

Multiple cyclists have been struck by drivers while training in the weeks ahead of their Pelotonia events. Among them, Michael Tighe, a 39-year-old cancer survivor, was struck and killed on the morning of June 4, 2019, riding in the berm.

In 2018, it was discovered by friends and fundraising supporters that John Looker, a prominent Pelotonia participant for at least seven years, was not battling cancer as he had claimed. Looker deceived his domestic partner, fellow Pelotonia participants, and the families of cancer patients that he had survived Stage IV brain cancer, only to claim that it had variously metastasized and reappeared over subsequent years. Upon learning that Looker had confessed to his deception, Pelotonia officials brought this to the attention of the Columbus Police Department and the Ohio Attorney General's office. They had previously heard concerns that Looker's story did not add up and removed him from Pelotonia marketing in 2015. The deception was emotionally harmful to people who believed they were supporting a cancer survivor and to the Pelotonia community, CEO Doug Ulman said in a statement, "There are still feelings of deep disappointment and a sense of betrayal over John’s deception." Looker had pocketed at least $1000 in funds raised for Pelotonia; the decentralized model relies on individual riders accurately reporting and turning in donations they have raised. He settled with the Ohio Attorney General's office, paying $1800 in restitution and a $2000 civil fine. Charges were not filed against Looker or Pelotonia.

== Event format ==
To participate in Pelotonia, riders sign up to bike one of several possible distances, ranging from 25 to 200 miles, with ascending mandatory minimum fundraising goals.

Pelotonia typically takes place the first weekend of August every year.

== See also ==
- List of health-related charity fundraisers
