= Pramod Kumar Srivastava =

- Born: August 15, 1955; India
- Education: University of Connecticut
- Known for: Research on cancer vaccines and tumor immunology
- Scientific career
- Fields: Immunology, Cancer immunotherapy
- Workplaces: University of Connecticut School of Medicine

Pramod Kumar Srivastava (born 15 August 1955) is an American immunologist and physician. He serves as the Eversource Energy chairman in experimental oncology at the University of Connecticut School of Medicine. His research focuses on cancer vaccines.

He is the scientific founder of Antigenics (AGEN), the New York-based biotech company.

== Early life and education ==
Srivastava received bachelor's and master's degrees from the University of Allahabad, with his master's degree in botany. He subsequently studied microbial genetics at Osaka University in Japan and completed his Ph.D. in biochemistry at the Centre for Cellular and Molecular Biology, Hyderabad, India. He later received an MD from the University of Connecticut School of Medicine.

In addition, he undertook postdoctoral research at Yale University and the Sloan Kettering Institute, where he worked in the laboratory of Lloyd J. Old.

== Career ==
In 1989, Srivastava joined the Mount Sinai School of Medicine as assistant professor in the Department of Pharmacology. He then joined Fordham University in 1993 as an associate professor of Biology and was later promoted to professor in 1995.

In 1997, he joined the University of Connecticut School of Medicine as a professor of medicine. He later became the founding director of the Center for Immunotherapy of Cancer and Infectious Diseases and also served as the founding chairman of the Department of Immunology. Since 2011, he has been the director of the Carole and Neag Comprehensive Cancer Center.

In 1994, he co-founded Antigenics (now Agenus), a biotechnology company developing cancer vaccines based on heat shock proteins. The company licensed patent rights arising from Srivastava’s research at Mount Sinai. He also chaired the company’s scientific advisory board and served on its board of directors.

=== Scientific and clinical work ===
Srivastava’s research has focused on neuroimmunology. His laboratory has studied the role of heat shock proteins in antigen presentation and immune activation. His work has also examined transient receptor potential vanilloid (TRPV) receptors on dendritic cells and their potential role in immune regulation in the gut.

In addition, his research has explored interactions between the nervous and immune systems, including the role of sympathetic nervous system signaling in neutrophil development and in the regulation of myeloid-derived suppressor cells and regulatory T cells.

== Recognitions ==
Srivastava was elected a Fellow of the National Academy of Inventors in 2015 and a Fellow of the American Association for the Advancement of Science in 2021.

In 2016, he received the Carole and Ray Neag Medal of Honor from the University of Connecticut. In 2020, he was among the recipients of the Society for Immunotherapy of Cancer's Team Science Award, which recognized scientists associated with Lloyd J. Old's laboratory. In addtion his earlier honors include the Gold Medal of the University of Allahabad, a First Independent Research Support and Transition award from the National Institutes of Health, the Irma T. Hirschl Award, an Investigator Award of the Cancer Research Institute, and induction to the UICC Roll of Honor. Since 1997, He has been member of the Scientific Advisory Council of the Cancer Research Institute and was founding section editor for stress and immunity at Cell Stress & Chaperones.

== Publications ==
Srivastava has authored more than 200 peer-reviewed publications in cancer immunology and related fields. His work has appeared in journals including Science, Nature Immunology, Immunity, The Journal of Experimental Medicine, and PNAS.

Selected publications include studies on:

- Heat shock protein–mediated antigen presentation
- CD91 as a receptor for heat shock proteins
- Mechanisms of cross-priming in CD8+ T cells
- Genomic profiling of mutational neoepitopes
- Sympathetic nervous system regulation of myeloid-derived suppressor cells
- Immune regulation in the gut and neuroimmunology interactions
