= Luca Filippi =

Italian racing driver

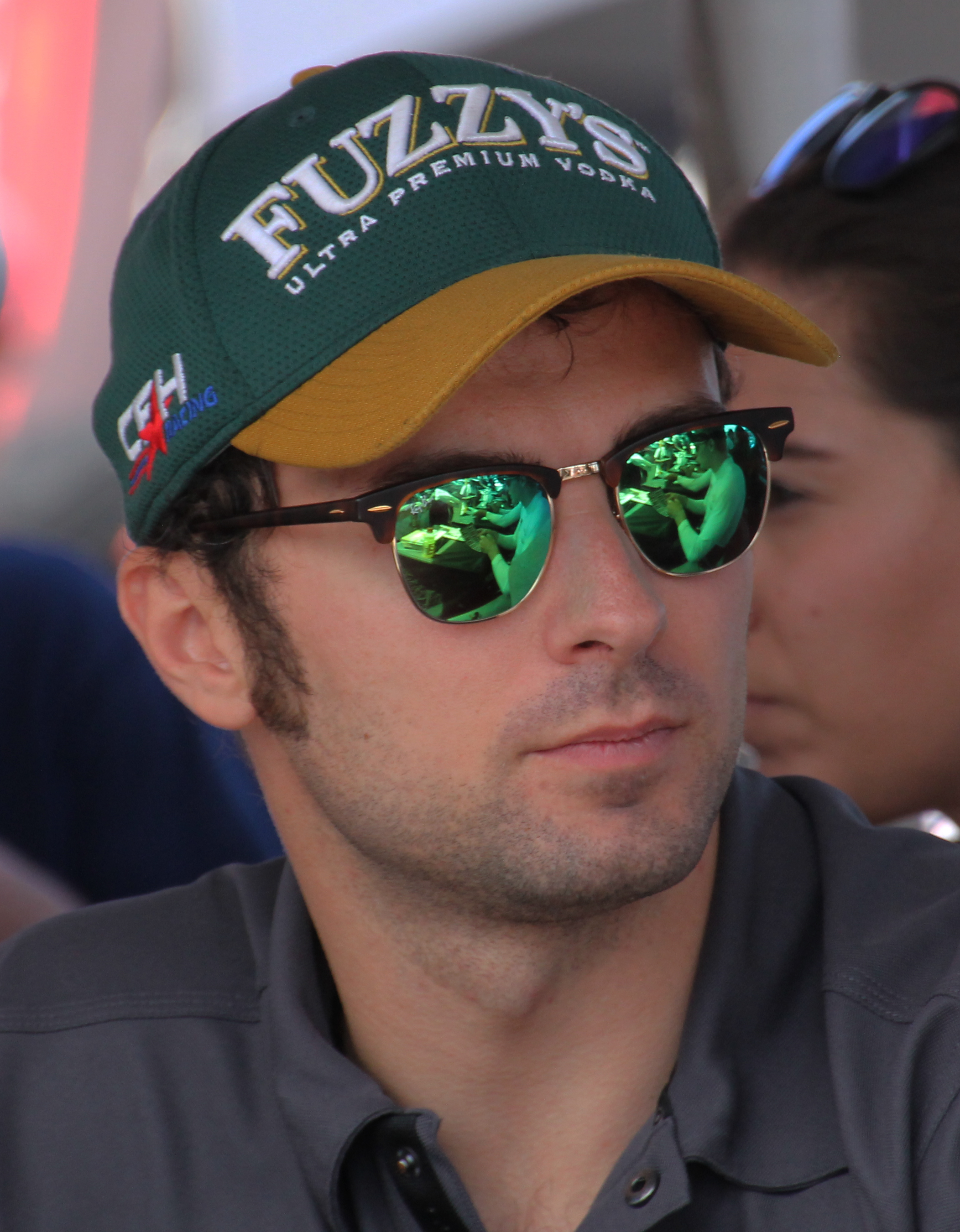
- Filippi at the 2015 GoPro Grand Prix of Sonoma
- Nationality: (Italy) Italian
- Born: 9 August 1985 (age 41) Savigliano, Italy

IndyCar Series career
- Debut season: 2013
- Categorisation: FIA Platinum (until 2021); FIA Gold (2022–)
- Former teams: Barracuda Racing, Rahal Letterman Lanigan Racing, CFH Racing, Dale Coyne Racing
- Starts: 22
- Wins: 0
- Podiums: 1
- Fastest laps: 1
- Best finish: 21st in 2015

Previous series
- 2008–2011 2008 2006 2005, 2007–08 2004–10 2003–04 2003–04 2003 2003: GP2 Asia Series; International GT Open; Renault Eurocup; Formula One testing Euro/Italian F3000/Auto GP; FR2000 Eurocup; Formula Renault 2000 Italia

Championship titles
- 2005: Italian F3000

Luca Filippi (born 9 August 1985 in Savigliano, Italy) is an Italian former auto racing driver. He competed in GP2 Series from 2006 to 2012, and the IndyCar Series from 2013 to 2016. In 2008, he was the official Honda Racing F1 test driver.

== Career ==
=== Formula Renault ===
Filippi made the step out of karting in 2003, competing in Formula Renault 2.0 Italia, where he finished third in 2004 behind Pastor Maldonado and Kohei Hirate.

=== Formula 3000 ===
Filippi stepped up to the Italian Formula 3000 series in 2005, driving for Giancarlo Fisichella's Fisichella Motorsport team. He also made his Formula One test debut in 2005 with Minardi in the team's last test.

=== GP2 Series ===
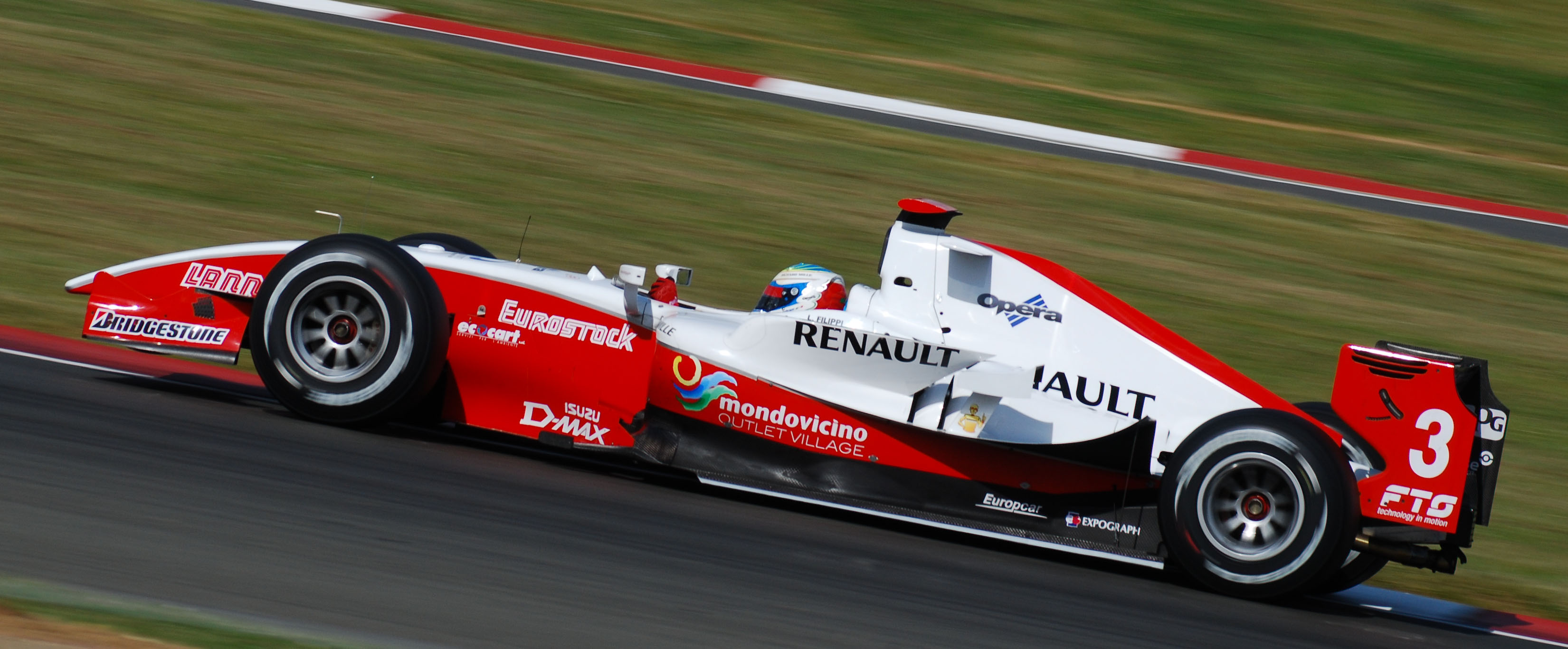
Filippi driving for ART Grand Prix at the Silverstone round of the 2008 GP2 Series season

Fisichella joined forces with the Coloni Motorsport GP2 Series team in 2006, and Filippi was selected as a driver for the team. However, he switched to the BCN Competición team mid-way through the season.

In 2007, Filippi continued in GP2 with Super Nova Racing and emerged as one of the series' top performers, finishing the season in fourth position.

On 14 November 2007, Filippi tested for Honda Racing F1. On 6 December Filippi tested for Super Aguri F1, being even faster than regular race driver Takuma Sato.

For the inaugural GP2 Asia Series season in early 2008, Filippi raced for Team Meritus, a Malaysian team who entered the series due to regular series team Racing Engineering not competing in the winter series. He only managed to score four points in ten races, finishing in seventeenth place.

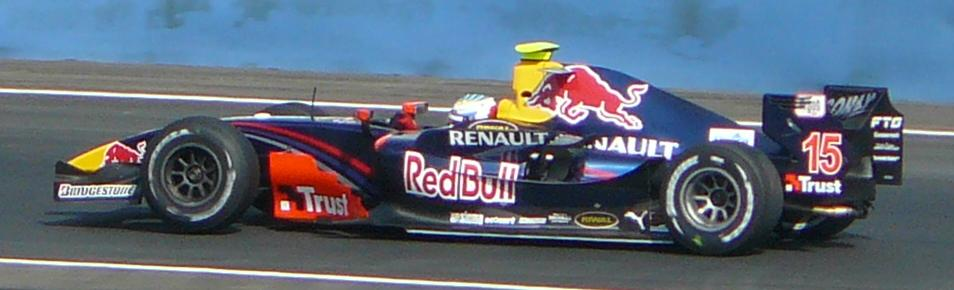
Filippi driving for Arden International at the Valencia round of the 2008 GP2 Series season

Filippi drove for the ART Grand Prix team in the first half of the 2008 GP2 Series season, alongside Romain Grosjean. Following a disappointing first half of the season, he left the team in favour of Sakon Yamamoto after ten races. Filippi was confirmed as a driver at the Arden International team two days later, where he replaced Yelmer Buurman. His results failed to improve and he finished nineteenth in the championship.

Filippi returned to BCN Competición for the 2008–09 GP2 Asia Series season, but was replaced by Fabrizio Crestani as a result of the team's purchase after the first round of the season.

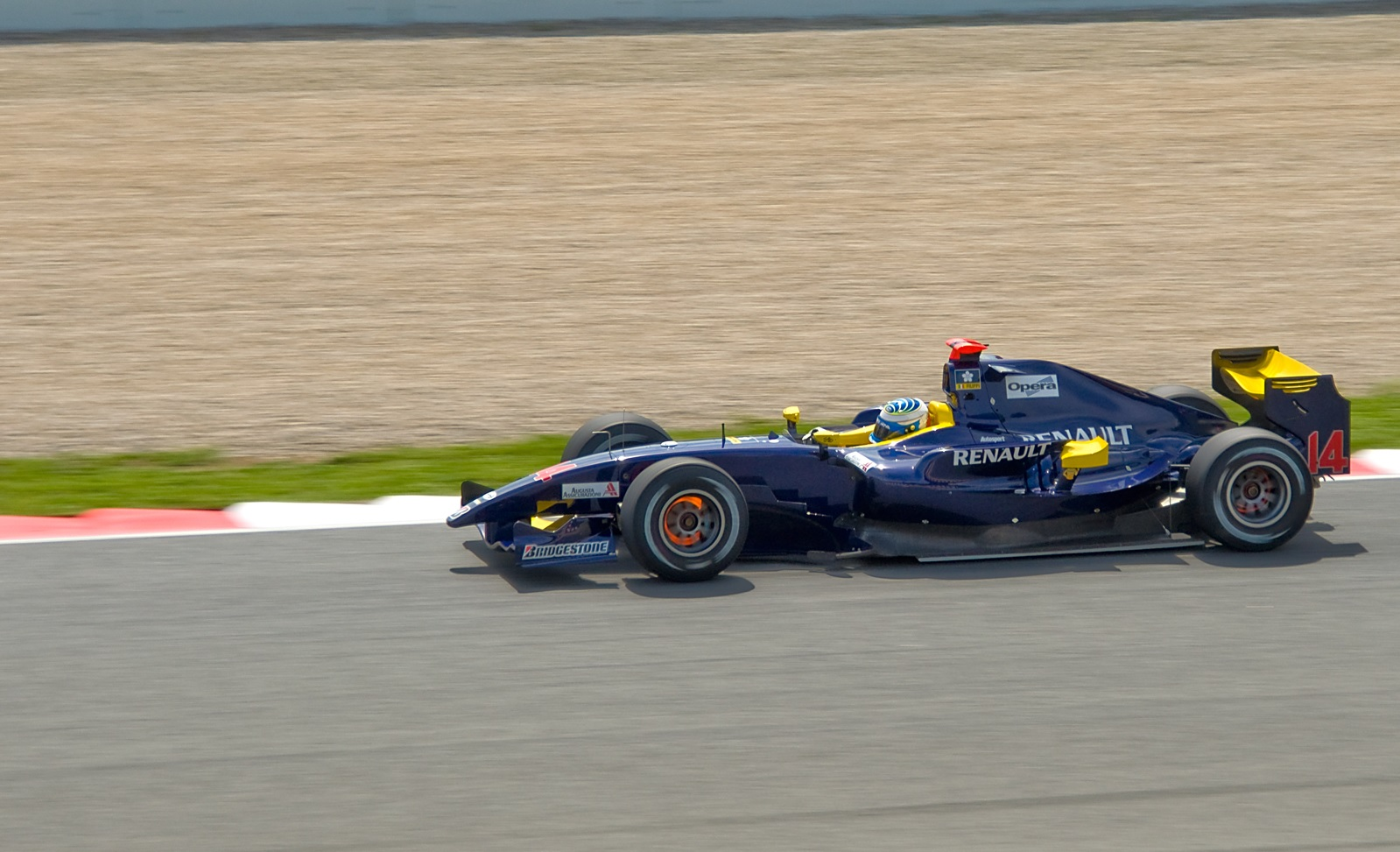
Filippi driving for Super Nova at the Catalunya round of the 2009 GP2 Series season

For the 2009 GP2 Series season, he returned to the Super Nova team and took the final win of the season at the Autódromo Internacional do Algarve. His result promoted him up to fifth overall in the championship standings.

Filippi returned to Team Meritus for the 2009–10 GP2 Asia Series season, and finished as runner-up in the championship standings, taking Meritus' first victory in the series in Bahrain.

Filippi began the 2010 GP2 Series season without a drive, but returned to Super Nova mid-season to replace the injured Josef Král. He took five points from ten races before Král returned for the season finale, finishing twentieth in the championship. During this period, Filippi became the most experienced GP2 driver in the series' history, beating Javier Villa's record of 82 race entries.

Filippi was drafted into the Scuderia Coloni team for the second round of the 2011 GP2 Asia Series season after regular driver James Jakes opted to move to the United States in order to pursue a career in the IndyCar Series. He returned once again to Super Nova for the main series, alongside Fairuz Fauzy. After five rounds of the championship, he switched back to Coloni, replacing Kevin Ceccon. He immediately registered an improvement in form, winning his first race for the team at the Nürburgring, which also marked his one-hundredth race in the series. He also won the Spa-Francorchamps sprint race and the Monza feature race, propelling him to a career-best second place in the drivers' championship.

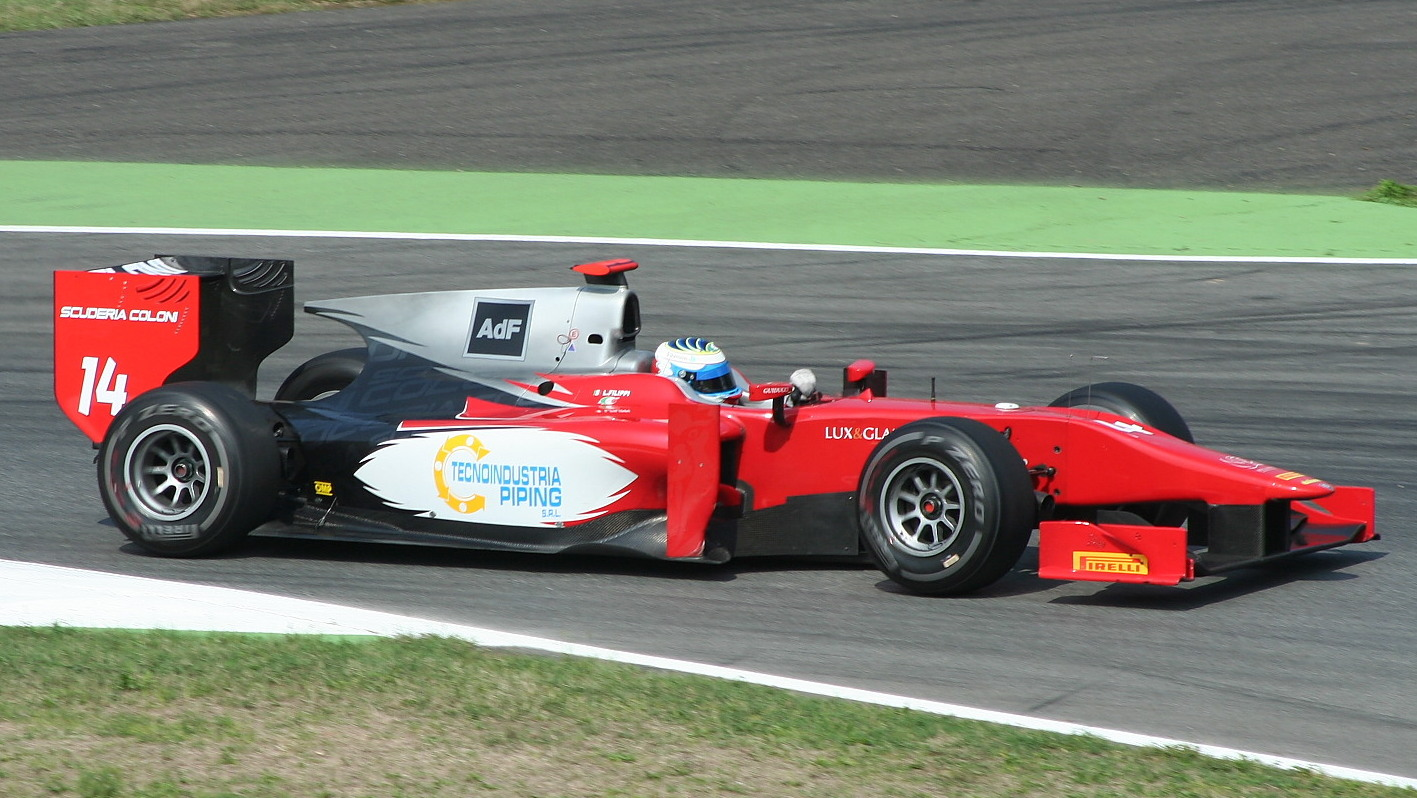
Filippi driving at Monza on his return to the GP2 Series.

After almost a year away from GP2, Filippi was again called up by Coloni as a replacement for Stefano Coletti for his home race of the 2012 championship at Monza. Despite his absence from the series, he won the feature race. He also secured pole position for the following (and final) round of the championship in Singapore, but crashed heavily during the feature race, damaging his car beyond immediate repair and thus non-starting the sprint race. Nevertheless, he still finished sixteenth in the drivers' championship despite contesting only four of the series' 24 races.

=== Auto GP ===
Filippi contested in the 2010 Auto GP season, where he finished fifth in the drivers' standings with two victories, topping and tailing the season with the first race at Brno and the last race at Monza. He returned to the series the following year, taking one pole position, three fastest laps, one win and five further podiums, finishing as runner-up to Kevin Ceccon by only three points despite having missed two races.

=== IndyCar ===
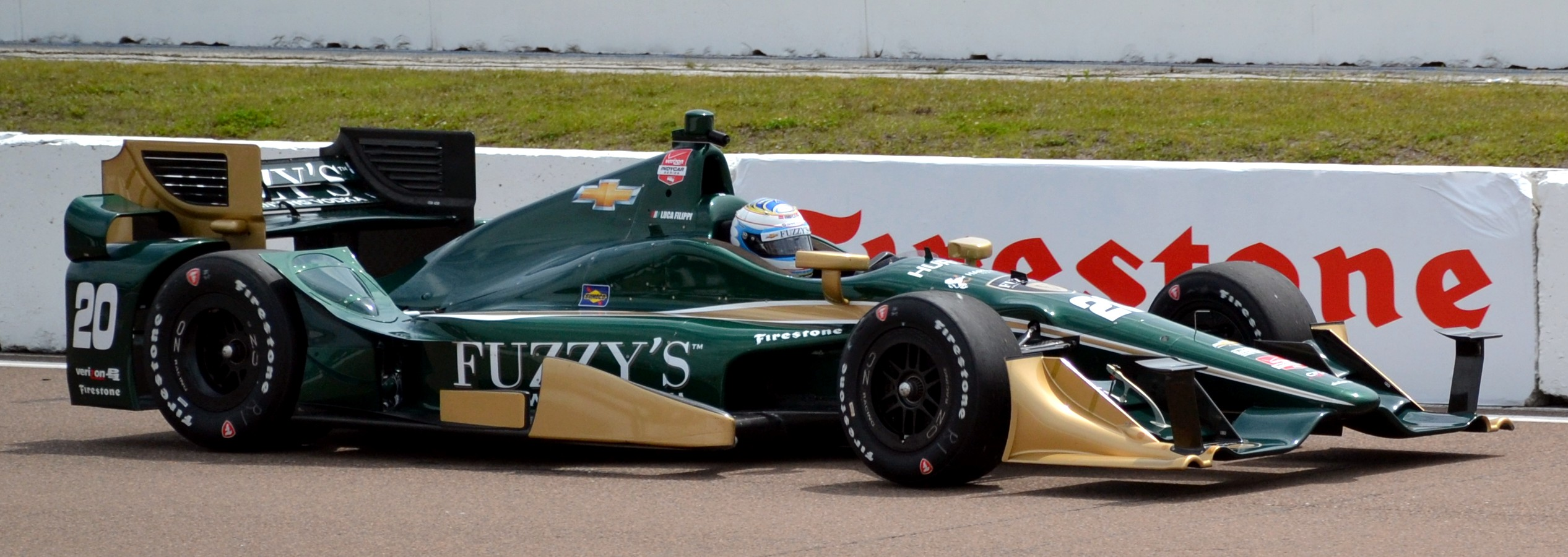
Filippi driving at the 2015 Firestone Grand Prix of St. Petersburg.

On 6 March 2012, it was announced that Filippi would join Rahal Letterman Lanigan Racing in the IndyCar series from the Indy 500 onwards. He would have partnered ex-Formula 1 driver Takuma Sato; despite this, he did not take part in the Indy 500 nor in the following races. He competed in four races in 2013 for Bryan Herta Autosport, scoring a best finish of fifteenth.

CFH Racing signed Filippi for the 2015 IndyCar season to compete at the road/street races.

For the 2016 season, Filippi signed with Dale Coyne Racing to compete in the whole season, ovals included. His first race on an oval track was in Phoenix, Arizona, where he finished in twentieth. A few days before the GP of Indianapolis, Coyne excluded Filippi from both Indy events and signed Gabby Chaves in place of the Italian driver.

=== Formula E ===
2017 saw Filippi join Nio in the all-electric FIA Formula E Championship alongside Oliver Turvey, where he picked up a point in his debut race with a tenth-place finish in the 2017 Hong Kong ePrix. Despite a strong debut, Filippi failed to pick up another point during the season. He missed the Paris ePrix, so that Ma Qinghua could fulfil a contract deal. He scored just one point to Turvey's 46 and was dropped by NIO for the 2018/19 season.

== Racing record ==
=== Career summary ===
Season	Series	Team name	Races	Poles	Wins	Podiums	Points	Position
2005	Italian Formula 3000	Fisichella Motor Sport	8	4	4	6	65	**1st**
2006	GP2 Series	Petrol Ofisi FMS International	6	0	0	0	2	19th
2006	GP2 Series	BCN Competición	12	0	0	0	5	19th
2007	GP2 Series	Super Nova International	21	2	1	6	59	4th
2008	GP2 Asia Series	Qi-Meritus Mahara	10	0	0	0	4	17th
2008	GP2 Series	ART Grand Prix	10	0	0	1	5	19th
2008	GP2 Series	Arden International	10	0	0	0	1	19th
2008	Formula One	Honda Racing F1 Team	Test driver					
2008–09	GP2 Asia Series	BCN Competición	2	0	0	0	0	NC
2009	GP2 Series	Super Nova Racing	21	0	1	4	40	5th
2009–10	GP2 Asia Series	MalaysiaQi-Meritus.com	8	1	1	3	39	**2nd**
2010	GP2 Series	Super Nova Racing	10	1	0	0	5	20th
2010	Auto GP	Euronova Racing	10	2	1	3	34	5th
2011	GP2 Series	Super Nova Racing	10	0	0	1	9	**2nd**
2011	GP2 Series	Scuderia Coloni	8	0	3	4	45	**2nd**
2011	GP2 Asia Series	Scuderia Coloni	2	0	0	0	0	20th
2011	Auto GP	Super Nova Racing	12	1	1	6	127	**2nd**
2012	GP2 Series	Scuderia Coloni	4	1	1	1	29	16th
2013	IndyCar Series	Barracuda Racing	4	0	0	0	53	30th
2014	IndyCar Series	Rahal Letterman Lanigan Racing	4	0	0	0	46	28th
2015	IndyCar Series	Carpenter Fisher Hartman Racing	10	0	0	1	182	21st
2016	IndyCar Series	Dale Coyne Racing	5	0	0	0	61	26th
2017	Blancpain GT Series Endurance Cup	Attempto Racing	0	0	0	0	0	NC
2017	Blancpain GT Series Endurance Cup	Orange 1 Team Lazarus	2	0	0	0	0	NC
2017	Intercontinental GT Challenge	Orange 1 Team Lazarus	1	0	0	0	0	NC
2017–18	Formula E	Nio Formula E Team	11	0	0	0	1	21st
2019	TCR Europe Touring Car Series	BRC Racing Team	14	1	0	1	99	16th
2020	World Touring Car Cup	Team Mulsanne	11	0	0	0	0	NC†
2020–21	Formula E	Nio 333 FE Team	Reserve driver					
2021	Pure ETCR Championship	Romeo Ferraris/M1RA	5	0	0	1	218	7th
2022	FIA ETCR – eTouring Car World Cup	Romeo Ferraris	6	0	0	0	181	12th

^{†} As Filippi was a guest driver, he was ineligible for points. ^{*} Season still in progress.

=== Complete Formula Renault 2.0 Italia results ===
(key) (Races in bold indicate pole position) (Races in italics indicate fastest lap)

Year	Entrant	1	2	3	4	5	6	7	8	9	10	11	12	13	14	15	16	17	DC	Points
2003	Euronova Junior Team	VLL; Ret	VLL; 19	MGI; Ret	SPA; 13	SPA; 16	A1R; 14	A1R; 9	MIS; 8	MIS; 8	VAR; 11	ADR; 19	MNZ; Ret						18th	16
2004	Euronova Junior Team	VLL; 1; 4	VLL; 2; 2	VAR; 3	MGI; 6	SPA; 1; 2	SPA; 2; 4	MNZ; 1; 3	**MNZ**; **2**; 26	MNZ; 3 Ret	MIS; 1; 9	MIS; 2; 5	MIS; 3; 2	ADR; 7	HOC; 1; 8	HOC; 2; 4	MNZ; 1; 3	MNZ; 2; 2	3rd	234

=== Complete Formula Renault 2.0 Eurocup results ===
(key) (Races in bold indicate pole position) (Races in italics indicate fastest lap)

Year	Entrant	1	2	3	4	5	6	7	8	9	10	11	12	13	14	15	16	17	DC	Points
2003	Euronova Junior Team	BRN; 1; 23	BRN; 2 Ret	ASS; 1 Ret	ASS; 2 Ret	OSC; 1	OSC; 2	DON; 1; 19	DON; 2 Ret										41st	0
2004	Euronova Junior Team	MNZ; 1; 12	MNZ; 2 Ret	VAL; 1	VAL; 2	MAG; 1	MAG; 2	HOC; 1; 23	HOC; 2; 14	BRN; 1	BRN; 2	DON; 1	DON; 2	SPA; 18	IMO; 1; 15	IMO; 2; 5	OSC; 1 Ret	OSC; 2; 12	20th	14

=== Complete Euro/Italian Formula 3000 Championship results ===
(key) (Races in bold indicate pole position) (Races in italics indicate fastest lap)

Year	Entrant	1	2	3	4	5	6	7	8	9	10	DC	Points
2004	Euronova Racing	BRN	EST	JER	MNZ	SPA	DON	DIJ	ZOL	NÜR1; 10†	NÜR2; Ret	20th	0
2005	Fisichella Motorsport	ADR; 3	**VLL**; Ret	**BRN**; 1	**IMO**; 1	**MUG**; 1	MGI; 5	MNZ; 1	MIS; 2			1st	65

=== Complete GP2 Series results ===
(key) (Races in bold indicate pole position) (Races in italics indicate fastest lap)

Year	Entrant	1	2	3	4	5	6	7	8	9	10	11	12	13	14	15	16	17	18	19	20	21	22	23	24	DC	Points
2006	Petrol Ofisi FMS International	VAL; FEA; Ret	VAL; SPR; Ret	IMO; FEA; 11	IMO; SPR; 5	NÜR; FEA; Ret	NÜR; SPR; Ret	CAT; FEA	CAT; SPR	MON; FEA																19th	7
2006	BCN Competición										SIL; FEA; Ret	SIL; SPR; 9	MAG; FEA; Ret	MAG; SPR; Ret	HOC; FEA; 21	HOC; SPR; 16	HUN; FEA; 12	HUN; SPR; Ret	IST; FEA; 10	IST; SPR; Ret	MNZ; FEA; 4	MNZ; SPR; 7				19th	7
2007	Super Nova International	**BHR**; **FEA**; 1	BHR; SPR; 3	CAT; FEA; Ret	CAT; SPR; 11	MON; FEA; 4	MAG; FEA; 4	MAG; SPR; 2	SIL; FEA; 5	SIL; SPR; 7	NÜR; FEA; Ret	NÜR; SPR; Ret	HUN; FEA; Ret	HUN; SPR; 16	**IST**; **FEA**; Ret	IST; SPR; 7	MNZ; FEA; 2	MNZ; SPR; 2	SPA; FEA; 2	SPA; SPR; 7	VAL; FEA; 18	VAL; SPR; 6				4th	59
2008	ART Grand Prix	CAT; FEA; 11	CAT; SPR; Ret	IST; FEA; 16	IST; SPR; 14	MON; FEA; Ret	MON; SPR; 12	MAG; FEA; 10	MAG; SPR; 3	SIL; FEA; 8	SIL; SPR; Ret															19th	6
2008	Arden International											HOC; FEA; Ret	HOC; SPR; Ret	HUN; FEA; 15	HUN; SPR; NC	VAL; FEA; 8	VAL; SPR; 13	SPA; FEA; 19	SPA; SPR; Ret	MNZ; FEA; Ret	MNZ; SPR; Ret					19th	6
2009	Super Nova Racing	CAT; FEA; 4	CAT; SPR; 7	MON; FEA; Ret	MON; SPR; NC	IST; FEA; 2	IST; SPR; Ret	SIL; FEA; 14	SIL; SPR; 16	NÜR; FEA; Ret	NÜR; SPR; 18	HUN; FEA; 6	HUN; SPR; 2	VAL; FEA; 7	VAL; SPR; Ret	SPA; FEA; Ret	SPA; SPR; Ret	MNZ; FEA; Ret	MNZ; SPR; Ret	POR; FEA; 2	POR; SPR; 1					5th	40
2010	Super Nova Racing	CAT; FEA	CAT; SPR	MON; FEA	MON; SPR	IST; FEA	IST; SPR	VAL; FEA	VAL; SPR	SIL; FEA; 20	SIL; SPR; 9	HOC; FEA; 10	HOC; SPR; 7	HUN; FEA; 14	HUN; SPR; 6	SPA; FEA; 5	SPA; SPR; Ret	MNZ; FEA; Ret	MNZ; SPR; 14	YMC; FEA	YMC; SPR					20th	5
2011	Super Nova Racing	IST; FEA; Ret	IST; SPR; 14	CAT; FEA; Ret	CAT; SPR; Ret	MON; FEA; 3	MON; SPR; 4	VAL; FEA; Ret	VAL; SPR; 15	SIL; FEA; 13	SIL; SPR; 12															**2nd**	**54**
2011	Scuderia Coloni											NÜR; FEA; 1	NÜR; SPR; 3	HUN; FEA; 6	HUN; SPR; Ret	SPA; FEA; 4	SPA; SPR; 1	MNZ; FEA; 1	MNZ; SPR; 5							**2nd**	**54**
2012	Scuderia Coloni	SEP; FEA	SEP; SPR	BHR1; FEA	BHR1; SPR	BHR2; FEA	BHR2; SPR	CAT; FEA	CAT; SPR	MON; FEA	MON; SPR	VAL; FEA	VAL; SPR	SIL; FEA	SIL; SPR	HOC; FEA	HOC; SPR	HUN; FEA	HUN; SPR	SPA; FEA	SPA; SPR	MNZ; FEA; 1	MNZ; SPR; 22	**MRN**; **FEA**; Ret	MRN; SPR; DNS	16th	29

==== Complete GP2 Asia Series results ====
(key) (Races in bold indicate pole position) (Races in italics indicate fastest lap)

Year	Entrant	1	2	3	4	5	6	7	8	9	10	11	12	DC	Points
2008	Qi-Meritus Mahara	DUB1; FEA; 5	DUB1; SPR; Ret	IDN; FEA; DSQ	SEN; SPR; 21	SEP; FEA; Ret	SEP; SPR; Ret	BHR; FEA; Ret	BHR; SPR; 11	DUB2; FEA; 12	DUB2; SPR; Ret			17th	4
2008–09	BCN Competición	SHI; FEA; Ret	SHI; SPR; Ret	DUB; FEA	DUB; SPR	BHR1; FEA	BHR1; SPR	LSL; FEA	LSL; SPR	SEP; FEA	SEP; SPR	BHR2; FEA	BHR2; SPR	NC	0
2009–10	MalaysiaQi-Meritus.com	YMC1; FEA; 2	YMC1; SPR; 8	YMC2; FEA; 14	YMC2; SPR; 17	BHR1; FEA; 2	BHR1; SPR; 18	**BHR2**; **FEA**; 1	BHR2; SPR; 8					**2nd**	**29**
2011	Scuderia Coloni	YMC; FEA	YMC; SPR	IMO; FEA; 20	IMO; SPR; 10									20th	0

=== Complete Auto GP series results ===
(key) (Races in bold indicate pole position) (Races in italics indicate fastest lap)

Year	Entrant	1	2	3	4	5	6	7	8	9	10	11	12	13	14	Pos	Points
2010	Euronova Racing	BRN; 1; 1	BRN; 2; 13	**IMO**; **1**; 12	IMO; 2 Ret	SPA; 1; 2	SPA; 2; 5	MAG; 1	MAG; 2							5th	34
2010	Super Nova Racing									NAV; 1; 7	NAV; 2 Ret	MNZ; 1; 7	MNZ; 2; 1			5th	34
2011	Super Nova Racing	MNZ; 1; 2	MNZ; 2; 6	**HUN**; **1**; 11	HUN; 2; 2	BRN; 1; 1	BRN; 2; 3	DON; 1; 2	DON; 2; 5	OSC; 1	OSC; 2	VAL; 1; 12	VAL; 2; 7	MUG; 1; 2	MUG; 2; 4	**2nd**	**127**

=== IndyCar Series results ===
(key) (Races in bold indicate pole position) (Races in italics indicate fastest lap)

Year	Team	No.	Chassis	Engine	1	2	3	4	5	6	7	8	9	10	11	12	13	14	15	16	17	18	19	Rank	Points	Ref
2013	Barracuda Racing	98	Dallara DW12	Honda	STP	ALA	LBH	SAO	INDY	DET	DET	TXS	MIL	IOW	POC	TOR	TOR	MDO; 16	SNM	BAL; 22	HOU; 10	HOU; 19	FON	30th	53	
2014	Rahal Letterman Lanigan Racing	16	Dallara DW12	Honda	STP	LBH	ALA	IMS	INDY	DET	DET	TXS	HOU; 21	HOU; 15	POC	IOW	TOR; 22	TOR; 16	MDO	MIL	SNM	FON		28th	46	
2015	CFH Racing	20	Dallara DW12	Chevrolet	STP; 9	NLA; 10	LBH; 22	ALA; 11	IMS; 14	INDY	DET; 9	DET; 17	TXS	TOR; 2	FON	MIL	IOW	MDO; 21	POC	SNM; 24				21st	182	
2016	Dale Coyne Racing	19	Dallara DW12	Honda	STP; 20	PHX; 20	LBH; 17	ALA; 18	IMS	INDY	DET	DET	RDA	IOW	TOR; 14	MDO	POC	TXS	WGL	SNM				26th	61	

=== Complete Formula E results ===
(key) (Races in bold indicate pole position; races in italics indicate fastest lap)

Year	Team	Chassis	Powertrain	1	2	3	4	5	6	7	8	9	10	11	12	Pos	Points
2017–18	Nio Formula E Team	Spark SRT01-e	NextEV Nio Sport 003	HKG; 10	HKG; Ret	MRK; 16	SCL; 12	MEX; 14	PDE; 13	RME; 13	PAR	BER; 17	ZUR; Ret	NYC; 15	NYC; Ret	21st	1

=== Complete TCR Europe Touring Car Series results ===
(key) (Races in bold indicate pole position) (Races in italics indicate fastest lap)

Year	Team	Car	1	2	3	4	5	6	7	8	9	10	11	12	13	14	DC	Points
2019	BRC Racing Team	Hyundai i30 N TCR	HUN; 1; 11	HUN; 2 Ret	HOC; 1 Ret	HOC; 2; 12	SPA; 1; 15	SPA; 2; 8	**RBR**; **1**; 2	RBR; 2; 21†	OSC; 1; 7	OSC; 2; 11	CAT; 1; 28†	CAT; 2; 25	MNZ; 1 Ret	MNZ; 2; 11	16th	99

^{†} Driver did not finish the race, but was classified as he completed over 90% of the race distance.

=== Complete World Touring Car Cup results ===
(key) (Races in bold indicate pole position) (Races in italics indicate fastest lap)

Year	Team	Car	1	2	3	4	5	6	7	8	9	10	11	12	13	14	15	16	DC	Points
2020	Team Mulsanne	Alfa Romeo Giulietta Veloce TCR	BEL; 1; 18	BEL; 2; 16	GER; 1	GER; 2	SVK; 1; 12	SVK; 2 Ret	SVK; 3 Ret	HUN; 1; 13	HUN; 2; 13	HUN; 3; 15	ESP; 1	ESP; 2	ESP; 3	ARA; 1 Ret	ARA; 2; 9	ARA; 3; 12	NC‡	0‡

^{‡} As Filippi was a Wildcard entry, he was ineligible to score points.

Sporting positions
Preceded by Nicky Pastorelli	Italian Formula 3000; Champion; 2005	Succeeded by Giacomo Ricci
