= 2015 Firestone Grand Prix of St. Petersburg =

(United States) 2015 St. Petersburg
Race details
1st round of the 2015 IndyCar Series season
Next race →
- Date: March 29, 2015
- Official name: Firestone Grand Prix of St. Petersburg
- Location: Streets of St. Petersburg
- Course: Temporary street circuit 1.800 mi / 2.897 km
- Distance: 110 laps 198.000 mi / 318.670 km

Pole position
- Driver: (Australia) Will Power (Team Penske)
- Time: 1:00.6931

Fastest lap
- Driver: (Brazil) Hélio Castroneves (Team Penske)
- Time: 1:01.8607 (on lap 95 of 110)

Podium
- First: (Colombia) Juan Pablo Montoya (Team Penske)
- Second: (Australia) Will Power (Team Penske)
- Third: (Brazil) Tony Kanaan (Chip Ganassi Racing)

Chronology
Previous	Next
2014	2016

The 2015 Firestone Grand Prix of St. Petersburg was the first round of the 2015 IndyCar Series, the race took place on March 29 in St. Petersburg, Florida, on the city's temporary street course. The race was won by Juan Pablo Montoya with Will Power finishing second, both racing for Team Penske. Tony Kanaan finished third ahead of Hélio Castroneves, and Simon Pagenaud. The top finishing rookie in the race was Gabby Chaves, in 17th position.

== Report ==
Key	Meaning
R	Rookie
W	Past winner

=== Qualifying ===
Pos	No.	Name	Grp.	Round 1	Round 2	Round 3
1	1	(Australia) Will Power W	2	1:00.8344	1:00.6509	1:00.6931
2	22	(France) Simon Pagenaud	1	1:01.4300	1:00.8645	1:00.7252
3	3	(Brazil) Hélio Castroneves W	2	1:01.0488	1:01.0425	1:00.8356
4	2	(Colombia) Juan Pablo Montoya	1	1:01.1878	1:00.9720	1:00.8532
5	14	(Japan) Takuma Sato	1	1:01.3370	1:00.9704	1:01.1496
6	11	(France) Sébastien Bourdais	2	1:01.4272	1:00.9378	1:01.1545
7	10	(Brazil) Tony Kanaan	1	1:01.4209	1:01.1182	
8	28	(United States) Ryan Hunter-Reay	1	1:01.4907	1:01.1670	
9	9	(New Zealand) Scott Dixon	2	1:01.1961	1:01.2285	
10	21	(United States) Josef Newgarden	1	1:01.4945	1:01.2478	
11	25	(Switzerland) Simona de Silvestro	1	1:01.5475	1:01.3657	
12	27	(United States) Marco Andretti	2	1:01.3776	1:01.4765	
13	83	(United States) Charlie Kimball	1	1:01.5727		
14	26	(Colombia) Carlos Muñoz	2	1:01.4890		
15	15	(United States) Graham Rahal W	1	1:01.5742		
16	5	(Canada) James Hinchcliffe W	2	1:01.5780		
17	4	(Monaco) Stefano Coletti R	1	1:01.6727		
18	8	(United States) Sage Karam R	2	1:01.8011		
19	20	(Italy) Luca Filippi	1	1:01.6736		
20	7	(United Kingdom) James Jakes	2	1:01.8323		
21	41	(United Kingdom) Jack Hawksworth	1	1:02.0095		
22	98	(Colombia) Gabby Chaves R	2	1:01.9705		
23	19	(Italy) Francesco Dracone R	1	1:04.2654		
24	18	(Colombia) Carlos Huertas	2	1:01.9716		
OFFICIAL BOX SCORE

=== Race results ===
Pos	No.	Driver	Team	Engine & Aero Kit	Laps	Time/Retired	Pit Stops	Grid	Laps Led	Pts.^{1}
1	2	(Colombia) Juan Pablo Montoya W	Team Penske	Chevrolet	110	2:16:58.1079	3	4	27	51
2	1	(Australia) Will Power W	Team Penske	Chevrolet	110	+0.9930	3	1	75	44
3	10	(Brazil) Tony Kanaan	Chip Ganassi Racing	Chevrolet	110	+11.1685	3	7		35
4	3	(Brazil) Hélio Castroneves W	Team Penske	Chevrolet	110	+11.4376	3	3	1	33
5	22	(France) Simon Pagenaud	Team Penske	Chevrolet	110	+12.3909	3	2	2	31
6	11	(France) Sébastien Bourdais	KV Racing Technology	Chevrolet	110	+16.4923	3	6		28
7	28	(United States) Ryan Hunter-Reay	Andretti Autosport	Honda	110	+27.7102	3	8		26
8	41	(United Kingdom) Jack Hawksworth	A. J. Foyt Enterprises	Honda	110	+34.9206	5	21	5	25
9	20	(Italy) Luca Filippi	CFH Racing	Chevrolet	110	+38.1564	3	19		22
10	27	(United States) Marco Andretti	Andretti Autosport	Honda	110	+38.6910	4	12		20
11	15	(United States) Graham Rahal W	Rahal Letterman Lanigan Racing	Honda	110	+40.3895	4	15		19
12	21	(United States) Josef Newgarden	CFH Racing	Chevrolet	110	+51.7710	3	10		18
13	14	(Japan) Takuma Sato	A. J. Foyt Enterprises	Honda	110	+52.2688	4	5		17
14	26	(Colombia) Carlos Muñoz	Andretti Autosport	Honda	110	+56.7210	5	14		16
15	9	(New Zealand) Scott Dixon	Chip Ganassi Racing	Chevrolet	110	+59.6613	6	9		15
16	5	(Canada) James Hinchcliffe W	Schmidt Peterson Motorsports	Honda	110	+1:02.4581	4	16		14
17	98	(Colombia) Gabby Chaves R	Bryan Herta Autosport	Honda	110	+1:03.0667	5	22		13
18	25	(Switzerland) Simona de Silvestro	Andretti Autosport	Honda	110	+1:03.1422	8	11		12
19	8	(United States) Sage Karam R	Chip Ganassi Racing	Chevrolet	109	+1 Lap	4	18		11
20	4	(Monaco) Stefano Coletti R	KV Racing Technology	Chevrolet	109	+1 Lap	6	17		10
21	83	(United States) Charlie Kimball	Chip Ganassi Racing	Chevrolet	109	+1 Lap	5	13		9
22	7	(United Kingdom) James Jakes	Schmidt Peterson Motorsports	Honda	100	+10 Laps	5	20		8
23	19	(Italy) Francesco Dracone R	Dale Coyne Racing	Honda	70	Engine	4	23		7
24	18	(Colombia) Carlos Huertas	Dale Coyne Racing	Honda	70	Steering	1	24		6
OFFICIAL BOX SCORE

Notes

^{1} Points include 1 point for leading at least 1 lap during a race, an additional 2 points for leading the most race laps, and 1 point for Pole Position.

== Championship standings after the race ==
Drivers' Championship standings

Pos	Driver	Points
1	(Colombia) Juan Pablo Montoya	51
2	(Australia) Will Power	44
3	(Brazil) Tony Kanaan	35
4	(Brazil) Hélio Castroneves	33
5	(France) Simon Pagenaud	31

- Note: Only the top five positions are included.

Previous race: None	IndyCar Series; 2015 season	Next race: 2015 Indy Grand Prix of Louisiana
Previous race: 2014 Firestone Grand Prix of St. Petersburg	Honda Grand Prix of St. Petersburg	Next race: 2016 Firestone Grand Prix of St. Petersburg
