= 2015 Indy Grand Prix of Louisiana =

(United States) 2015 New Orleans
Race details
2nd round of the 2015 IndyCar Series season
← Previous race	Next race →
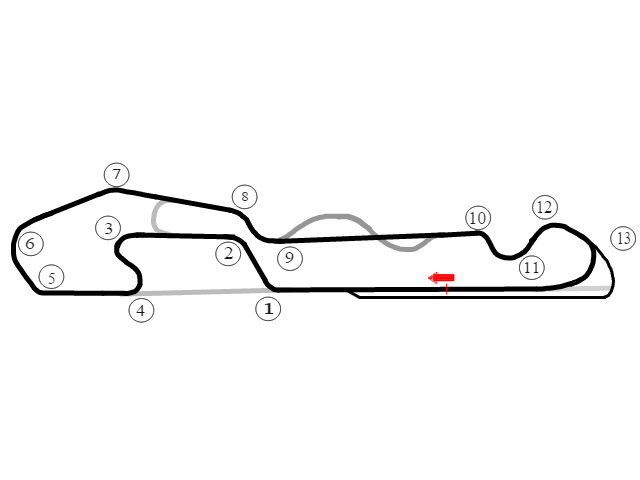
- Date: April 12, 2015
- Official name: Indy Grand Prix of Louisiana
- Location: NOLA Motorsports Park
- Course: Road course 2.75 mi / 4.42 km
- Distance: 47 laps 129.25 mi / 207.74 km
- Weather: Heavy rain

Pole position
- Driver: (Colombia) Juan Pablo Montoya (Team Penske)
- Time: Points

Fastest lap
- Driver: (New Zealand) Scott Dixon (Chip Ganassi Racing)
- Time: 1:28.5583 (on lap 40 of 47)

Podium
- First: (Canada) James Hinchcliffe (Schmidt Peterson Motorsports)
- Second: (Brazil) Hélio Castroneves (Team Penske)
- Third: (United Kingdom) James Jakes (Schmidt Peterson Motorsports)

The 2015 Indy Grand Prix of Louisiana was the second round of the 2015 IndyCar Series season, and the race took place on April 12 in New Orleans, Louisiana, at the NOLA Motorsports Park. The race was won by James Hinchcliffe for Schmidt Peterson Motorsports. Hélio Castroneves finished second for Team Penske. James Jakes finished third ahead of Simona de Silvestro, and Juan Pablo Montoya. The top finishing rookie in the race was Gabby Chaves, in 15th position.

== Report ==
Key	Meaning
R	Rookie
W	Past winner

=== Qualifying ===
Qualifying was cancelled as rain brought an early end to proceedings. The grid was set by entrant points standings from the previous race; the Grand Prix of St. Petersburg.

Pos	No.	Name	Entrant Points
1	2	(Colombia) Juan Pablo Montoya	51
2	1	(Australia) Will Power	44
3	10	(Brazil) Tony Kanaan	35
4	3	(Brazil) Hélio Castroneves	33
5	22	(France) Simon Pagenaud	31
6	11	(France) Sébastien Bourdais	28
7	28	(United States) Ryan Hunter-Reay	26
8	41	(United Kingdom) Jack Hawksworth	25
9	20	(Italy) Luca Filippi	22
10	27	(United States) Marco Andretti	20
11	15	(United States) Graham Rahal	19
12	21	(United States) Josef Newgarden	18
13	14	(Japan) Takuma Sato	17
14	26	(Colombia) Carlos Muñoz	16
15	9	(New Zealand) Scott Dixon	15
16	5	(Canada) James Hinchcliffe	14
17	98	(Colombia) Gabby Chaves R	13
18	25	(Switzerland) Simona de Silvestro	12
19	8	(United States) Sage Karam R	11
20	4	(Monaco) Stefano Coletti R	10
21	83	(United States) Charlie Kimball	9
22	7	(United Kingdom) James Jakes	8
23	19	(Italy) Francesco Dracone R	7
24	18	(Colombia) Carlos Huertas	6
Qualifications

=== Race results ===
Pos	No.	Driver	Team	Engine & Aero Kit	Laps	Time/Retired	Pit Stops	Grid	Laps Led	Pts.^{1}
1	5	(Canada) James Hinchcliffe	Schmidt Peterson Motorsports	Honda	47	1:47:19.4896	0	16	15	51
2	3	(Brazil) Hélio Castroneves	Team Penske	Chevrolet	47	+0.4279	0	4	1	41
3	7	(United Kingdom) James Jakes	Schmidt Peterson Motorsports	Honda	47	+0.8452	0	22		35
4	25	(Switzerland) Simona de Silvestro	Andretti Autosport	Honda	47	+1.2924	0	18		32
5	2	(Colombia) Juan Pablo Montoya	Team Penske	Chevrolet	47	+1.7564	0	1	31	33
6	10	(Brazil) Tony Kanaan	Chip Ganassi Racing	Chevrolet	47	+2.2638	0	3		28
7	1	(Australia) Will Power	Team Penske	Chevrolet	47	+3.0958	0	2		26
8	15	(United States) Graham Rahal	Rahal Letterman Lanigan Racing	Honda	47	+4.3495	0	11		24
9	21	(United States) Josef Newgarden	CFH Racing	Chevrolet	47	+5.7352	0	12		22
10	20	(Italy) Luca Filippi	CFH Racing	Chevrolet	47	+7.2115	0	9		20
11	9	(New Zealand) Scott Dixon	Chip Ganassi Racing	Chevrolet	47	+7.8421	0	15		19
12	26	(Colombia) Carlos Muñoz	Andretti Autosport	Honda	47	+9.0899	0	14		18
13	27	(United States) Marco Andretti	Andretti Autosport	Honda	47	+9.7817	0	10		17
14	83	(United States) Charlie Kimball	Chip Ganassi Racing	Chevrolet	47	+15.7221	0	21		16
15	98	(Colombia) Gabby Chaves R	Bryan Herta Autosport	Honda	46	+1 Lap	0	17		15
16	18	(Colombia) Carlos Huertas	Dale Coyne Racing	Honda	46	+1 Lap	0	24		14
17	4	(Monaco) Stefano Coletti R	KV Racing Technology	Chevrolet	44	+3 Laps	0	20		13
18	8	(United States) Sage Karam R	Chip Ganassi Racing	Chevrolet	44	+3 Laps	0	19		12
19	28	(United States) Ryan Hunter-Reay	Andretti Autosport	Honda	43	Crash T3	0	7		8
20	22	(France) Simon Pagenaud	Team Penske	Chevrolet	43	Crash T3	0	5		10
21	11	(France) Sébastien Bourdais	KV Racing Technology	Chevrolet	43	Crash T3	0	6		9
22	14	(Japan) Takuma Sato	A. J. Foyt Enterprises	Honda	39	Crash damage	0	13		8
23	19	(Italy) Francesco Dracone R	Dale Coyne Racing	Honda	23	Crash damage	0	23		7
24	41	(United Kingdom) Jack Hawksworth	A. J. Foyt Enterprises	Honda	19	Crash T13	0	8		6
OFFICIAL BOX SCORE

Notes

^{1} Points include 1 point for leading at least 1 lap during a race, an additional 2 points for leading the most race laps, and 1 point for Pole Position.

Race was scheduled for 75 laps but shortened due to time limit.

== Championship standings after the race ==
Drivers' Championship standings

	Pos	Driver	Points
	1	(Colombia) Juan Pablo Montoya	84
2	2	(Brazil) Hélio Castroneves	74
1	3	(Australia) Will Power	70
12	4	(Canada) James Hinchcliffe	65
2	5	(Brazil) Tony Kanaan	63

- Note: Only the top five positions are included.

Previous race: 2015 Firestone Grand Prix of St. Petersburg	IndyCar Series; 2015 season	Next race: 2015 Toyota Grand Prix of Long Beach
Previous race: None	Indy Grand Prix of Louisiana	Next race: None
