= 2015 IndyCar Series =

American auto racing season

2015 IndyCar season
- Verizon IndyCar Series

Season
- Races: 16
- Start date: March 29
- End date: August 30

Awards
- Drivers' champion: (New Zealand) Scott Dixon
- Manufacturers' Cup: (United States) Chevrolet
- Rookie of the Year: (Colombia) Gabby Chaves
- Indianapolis 500 winner: (Colombia) Juan Pablo Montoya

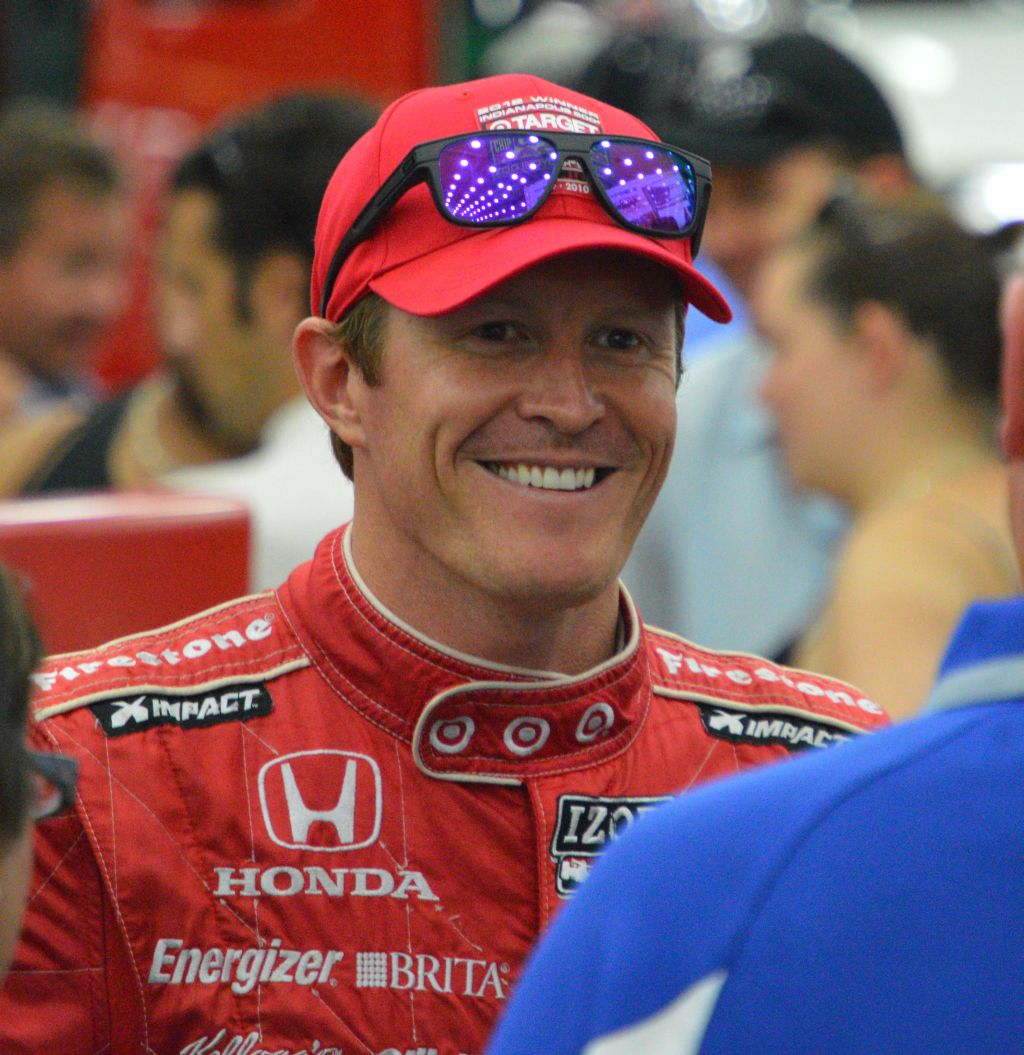
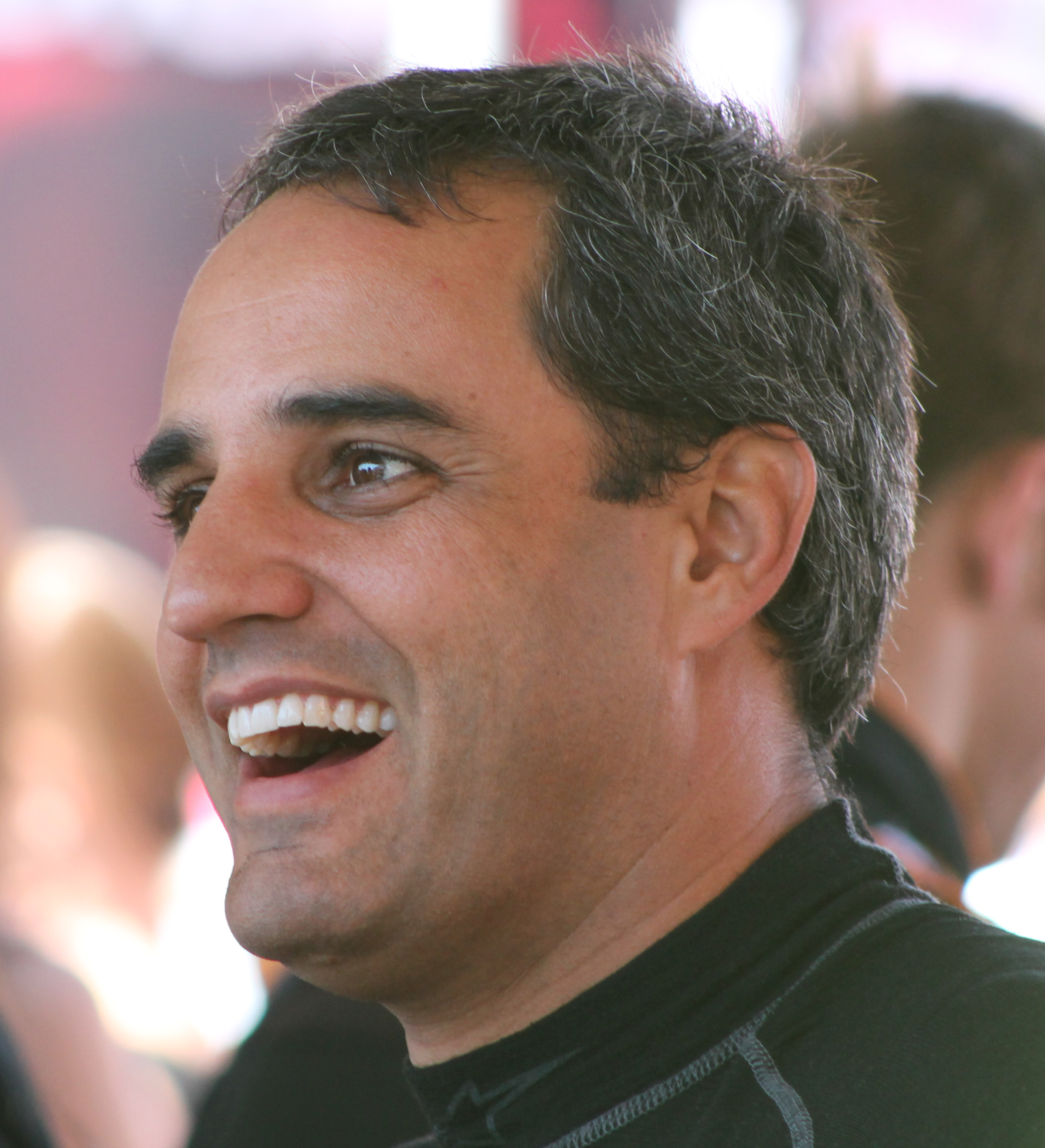
Scott Dixon (left) won his fourth Drivers' Championship while Juan Pablo Montoya (right) finished second in the championship on tiebreaker as Dixon had three race wins compared to Montoya who had only two race wins. In a remarkable end to the season, Dixon had to win the pole, the race and lead the most laps to equal Montoya's points tally.

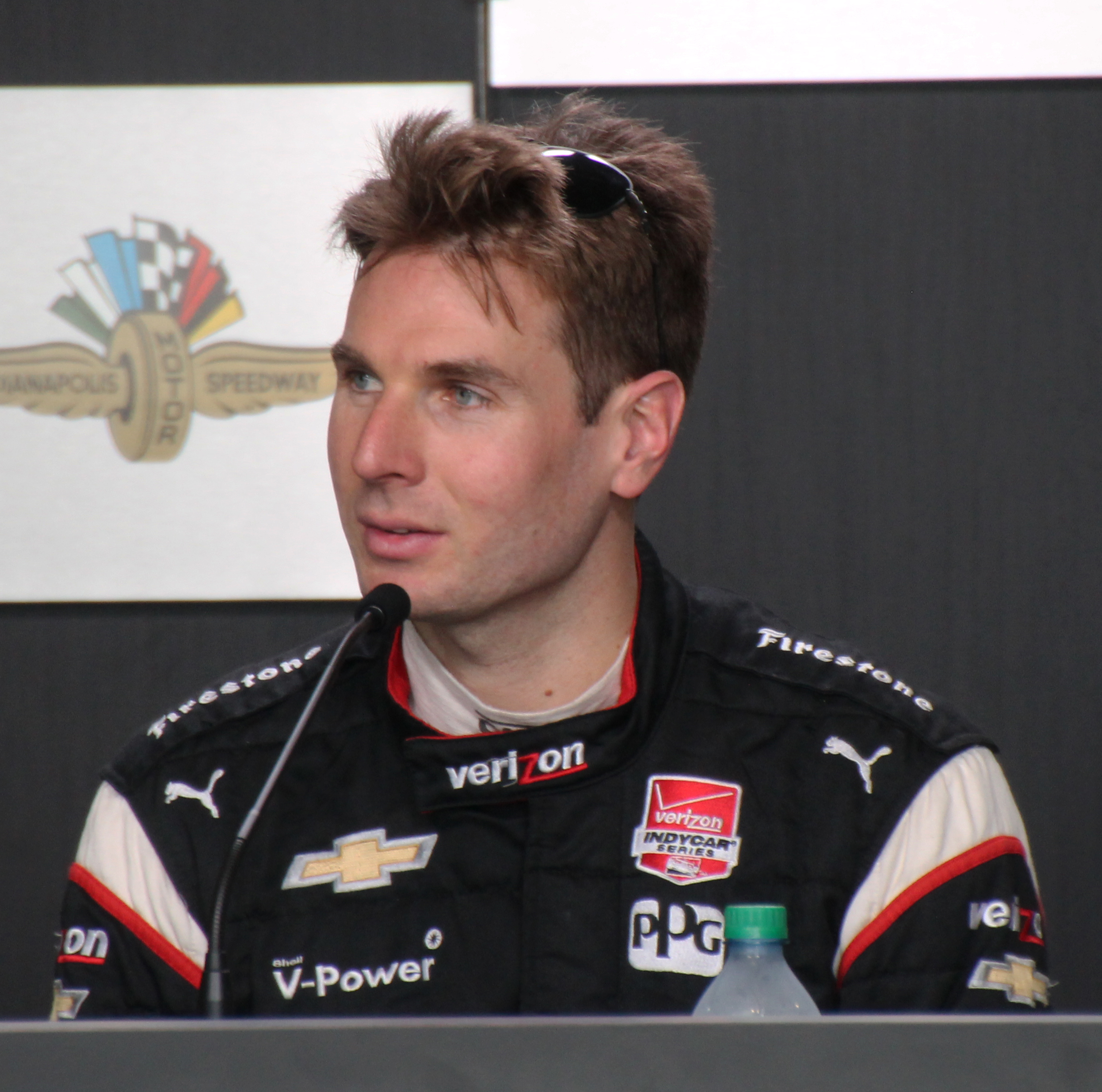
Defending champion Power took 3rd in the championship.

The 2015 Verizon IndyCar Series was the 20th season of the IndyCar Series and the 104th season of American open wheel racing. Its premier event was the 99th Indianapolis 500, which was held on May 24. Will Power returned as the reigning champion, while Ryan Hunter-Reay was the defending Indy 500 champion. Chevrolet entered the season as the reigning Manufacturers' champion. Indianapolis 500 and the season finale counted for double points.

The season was overshadowed by the death of driver Justin Wilson at Pocono, after being struck on the head by debris from Sage Karam's car.

A week after Wilson's fatal accident, the finale was held at Sonoma Raceway, where Scott Dixon secured his fourth career title after a low-key season that saw him win on a tiebreak against Juan Pablo Montoya following his third win of the season after many consistent finishes leading up to the finale. Montoya won the Indianapolis 500 earlier in the season. It was a very competitive season with no standout performers and many different race winners and pacesetters. Except Dixon's three race wins, he finished on the podium only once, but due to their consistent finishing Dixon and Montoya had a significant margin to reigning champion Will Power in third.

== Rules changes ==
- Aerokit modifications became specific to Honda and Chevy.
- Double points were awarded for the Indianapolis 500 race and for the season finale at Sonoma only. Previously double points were awarded at the three 500 mile oval events.
- Each team would continue to have two weeks of testing. Unlike past seasons, Promoter Days/Open Tests would count towards the testing allocation.
- The medical exemption was eliminated from pit selections. Pit selections are no longer based on drivers but teams' performance in the last race. This change eliminates a disadvantage by one IndyCar team that used a "two-platoon" system, with driver based on the circuit.
- Qualifying groups for qualifying at road/street course events was determined by the final practice session held before qualifying instead of by the first session of the weekend.
- Standing starts have been eliminated for 2015. The series says more development is needed before re-introducing them to the series, especially after numerous aborted standing starts and a crash at Houston during the 2013 season, and a start-line pile-up at the Indianapolis road course race in 2014.
- Each phase of the Indianapolis 500 Rookie Orientation Program saw see the speed requirements increased by 5 mph. Phase One consists of 10 laps at 205–210 mph, Phase Two of 15 laps at 210–215 mph and Phase Three of 15 laps at 215+ mph. The laps do not have to be consecutive. The phases and corresponding speeds may be adjusted based on track/weather conditions. The refresher program consisted of Phases Two and Three.

== Confirmed entries ==
The following teams, entries, and drivers were announced to compete in the 2015 Verizon IndyCar Series season. All teams used a spec Dallara DW12 chassis with manufacturer aero kits and Firestone tires.

Team	Engine	No.	Driver(s)	Round(s)
A. J. Foyt Enterprises	Honda	14	(Japan) Takuma Sato	All
A. J. Foyt Enterprises	Honda	41	(United Kingdom) Jack Hawksworth	All
A. J. Foyt Enterprises	Honda	48	(Canada) Alex Tagliani	6
Andretti Autosport	Honda	25	(Switzerland) Simona de Silvestro	1–2
Andretti Autosport	Honda	25	(United Kingdom) Justin Wilson	5–6, 12–15
Andretti Autosport	Honda	25	(Spain) Oriol Servià	16
Andretti Autosport	Honda	26	(Colombia) Carlos Muñoz	All
Andretti Autosport	Honda	27	(United States) Marco Andretti	All
Andretti Autosport	Honda	28	(United States) Ryan Hunter-Reay	All
Andretti Autosport	Honda	29	(Switzerland) Simona de Silvestro	6
Bryan Herta Autosport	Honda	98	(Colombia) Gabby Chaves R	All
CFH Racing	Chevrolet	6	(United States) J. R. Hildebrand	5–6
CFH Racing	Chevrolet	20	(Italy) Luca Filippi	1–5, 7–8, 10, 14, 16
CFH Racing	Chevrolet	20	(United States) Ed Carpenter	6, 9, 11–13, 15
CFH Racing	Chevrolet	67	(United States) Josef Newgarden	All
Chip Ganassi Racing	Chevrolet	8	(United States) Sage Karam R (Note: Not considered rookie for Indy 500.)	1–2, 4, 6–9, 11–15
Chip Ganassi Racing	Chevrolet	8	(Colombia) Sebastián Saavedra (Note: Conjunction with AFS Racing.)	3, 5, 10, 16
Chip Ganassi Racing	Chevrolet	9	(New Zealand) Scott Dixon	All
Chip Ganassi Racing	Chevrolet	10	(Brazil) Tony Kanaan	All
Chip Ganassi Racing	Chevrolet	17	(Colombia) Sebastián Saavedra	6
Chip Ganassi Racing	Chevrolet	83	(United States) Charlie Kimball	All
Dale Coyne Racing	Honda	18	(Colombia) Carlos Huertas (Note: Replaced after Indy 500 qualifying due to an inner ear infection.)	1–2, 5–6
Dale Coyne Racing	Honda	18	(United States) Rocky Moran Jr. R (Note: Injured during practice at Long Beach.)	3
Dale Coyne Racing	Honda	18	(United States) Conor Daly R	3
Dale Coyne Racing	Honda	18	(Venezuela) Rodolfo González R	4, 7–8, 10, 14, 16
Dale Coyne Racing	Honda	18	(France) Tristan Vautier	6
Dale Coyne Racing	Honda	18	(United Kingdom) Pippa Mann	9, 11–13, 15
Dale Coyne Racing	Honda	19	(Italy) Francesco Dracone R	1–5
Dale Coyne Racing	Honda	19	(Australia) James Davison R (Note: James Davison is considered a rookie in the IndyCar Series; however, he was not a rookie in the 2015 Indianapolis 500 as he participated in the Indy 500 in 2014.)	6
Dale Coyne Racing	Honda	19	(France) Tristan Vautier (Note: Vautier qualified the car at the Indy 500 for James Davison.)	6–16
Dale Coyne Racing	Honda	63	(United Kingdom) Pippa Mann	6
Dreyer & Reinbold - Kingdom Racing	Chevrolet	24	(United States) Townsend Bell	6
KV Racing Technology	Chevrolet	4	(Monaco) Stefano Coletti R	All
KVSH Racing	Chevrolet	11	(France) Sébastien Bourdais	All
KVSH Racing / Jonathan Byrd's Racing	Chevrolet	88	(United States) Bryan Clauson R	6
Lazier Partners Racing	Chevrolet	91	(United States) Buddy Lazier	6
Rahal Letterman Lanigan Racing	Honda	15	(United States) Graham Rahal	All
Rahal Letterman Lanigan Racing	Honda	32	(Spain) Oriol Servià	6
Schmidt Peterson Motorsports	Honda	5	(Canada) James Hinchcliffe (Note: Injured in practice for the Indy 500.)	1–6
Schmidt Peterson Motorsports	Honda	5	(Australia) Ryan Briscoe	6, 9, 11–16
Schmidt Peterson Motorsports	Honda	5	(United States) Conor Daly R	7–8, 10
Schmidt Peterson Motorsports	Honda	7	(United Kingdom) James Jakes	All
Schmidt Peterson Motorsports	Honda	43	(United States) Conor Daly R	6
Schmidt Peterson Motorsports	Honda	77	(Russia) Mikhail Aleshin	16
Team Penske	Chevrolet	1	(Australia) Will Power	All
Team Penske	Chevrolet	2	(Colombia) Juan Pablo Montoya	All
Team Penske	Chevrolet	3	(Brazil) Hélio Castroneves	All
Team Penske	Chevrolet	22	(France) Simon Pagenaud	All

=== Notes ===
- Bryan Clauson drove an entry fielded by Jonathan Byrd's Racing at the Indy 500 in 2015 and 2016. KV Racing Technology was confirmed to support the entry.
- Ed Carpenter Racing and Sarah Fisher Hartman Racing merged to form CFH Racing, and use Chevrolet engines and aerokits in 2015.
- Andretti Autosport re-signed Ryan Hunter-Reay and sponsor DHL to a multi-year contract.
- Josef Newgarden announced that he would drive the CFH Racing #67 entry full-time in 2015 with an option for an extension of the contract for a second year.
- Simon Pagenaud departed Schmidt Peterson Motorsports after three years and joined Team Penske in the No. 22 car.
- Team Penske president Tim Cindric confirmed on Twitter that defending series champion Will Power would be running the #1 car, as opposed to his usual #12.
- Ryan Briscoe did not return to Chip Ganassi Racing in 2015, and actively pursued another ride.
- James Hinchcliffe announced that he left Andretti Autosport to replace Pagenaud in the #5 Schmidt Peterson Racing car. He was joined in the team by James Jakes – replacing Mikhail Aleshin – who returned to the series after missing the 2014 season.
- Jack Hawksworth was confirmed to drive the #41 A. J. Foyt Enterprises car full-time in 2015. Takuma Sato returned to the team's #14 car.
- Mikhail Aleshin returned to Schmidt Peterson Motorsports in a 3rd entry at Sonoma.

== Schedule ==
Icon	Legend
O	Oval/Speedway
R	Road course
S	Street circuit
C	Cancelled race
BOLD	Fuzzy's Ultra Premium Vodka Triple Crown event.

Rd.	Date	Race name	Track	City
C	March 8	Itaipava Brasilia Indy 300	R Autódromo Internacional Nelson Piquet	Brasília, Brazil
1	March 29	Firestone Grand Prix of St. Petersburg	S Streets of St. Petersburg	St. Petersburg, Florida
2	April 12	Indy Grand Prix of Louisiana	R NOLA Motorsports Park	Avondale, Louisiana
3	April 19	Toyota Grand Prix of Long Beach	S Streets of Long Beach	Long Beach, California
4	April 26	Honda Indy Grand Prix of Alabama	R Barber Motorsports Park	Birmingham, Alabama
5	May 9	Angie's List Grand Prix of Indianapolis	R Indianapolis Motor Speedway Road Course	Speedway, Indiana
6	May 24	99th Indianapolis 500	O Indianapolis Motor Speedway	Speedway, Indiana
7	May 30	Chevrolet Indy Dual in Detroit	S Raceway at Belle Isle Park	Detroit, Michigan
8	May 31	Chevrolet Indy Dual in Detroit	S Raceway at Belle Isle Park	Detroit, Michigan
9	June 6	Firestone 600	O Texas Motor Speedway	Fort Worth, Texas
10	June 14	Honda Indy Toronto	S Exhibition Place	Toronto, Ontario
11	June 27	MAVTV 500	O Auto Club Speedway	Fontana, California
12	July 12	ABC Supply Wisconsin 250	O The Milwaukee Mile	West Allis, Wisconsin
13	July 18	Iowa Corn 300	O Iowa Speedway	Newton, Iowa
14	August 2	Honda Indy 200	R Mid-Ohio Sports Car Course	Lexington, Ohio
15	August 23	ABC Supply 500	O Pocono Raceway	Long Pond, Pennsylvania
16	August 30	GoPro Grand Prix of Sonoma	R Sonoma Raceway	Sonoma, California

=== Schedule changes and notes ===
- The Itaipava Brasília Indy 300 was scheduled to be held on March 8 at the Autódromo Internacional Nelson Piquet in Brasília, Brazil. On January 29, the race was cancelled by the Federal District officials newly elected in the 2014 national elections, where the incumbent Governor from the Workers' Party had been defeated, and replaced by the candidate from the Brazilian Socialist Party. As tires and fuel had already been shipped for the race, the series sent representatives to the Autódromo de Goiânia to check the viability of the venue to host the race.
- NOLA Motorsports Park was announced to have a race over the weekend of April 10–12, 2015.
- Texas Motor Speedway was confirmed to return to the June 4–6 weekend and that the race would be on NBCSN.
- Auto Club Speedway was confirmed to be scheduled for June 27, moved from their usual date at the end of the season.
- IndyCar & Mi-Jack Promotions announced on August 29, 2014, that the Houston doubleheader at NRG Park has been canceled for 2015 due to scheduling issues.
- The races at Barber Motorsports Park (April 26), Mid-Ohio Sports Car Course (August 2) and Sonoma Raceway (August 30) were confirmed by the release of the Pirelli World Challenge schedule; PWC supports those events on the IndyCar calendar as well as St. Petersburg, Long Beach & Detroit.
- The Toronto Sun reported that the Honda Indy Toronto would stay at Exhibition Place and would be run on the weekend of June 12–14, 2015, to avoid a clash with the 2015 Pan American Games, due to be held the following month in the city. Unlike the last two seasons, the race weekend only featured one race instead of two, making Detroit the only double-header weekend of the season.
- The ABC Supply Wisconsin 250 at the Milwaukee Mile was confirmed to be held on July 12, 2015, by the Milwaukee Journal Sentinel.
- The ABC Supply 500 at Pocono Raceway was moved from the July 4 weekend date the track had in 2013 and 2014 to the weekend of August 23 for the 2015 season.

== Results ==
Rd.	Race	Pole position	Fastest lap	Most laps led	Race Winner			Report
Rd.	Race	Pole position	Fastest lap	Most laps led	Driver	Team	Manufacturer	Report
1	St. Petersburg	(Australia) Will Power	(Brazil) Hélio Castroneves	(Australia) Will Power	(Colombia) Juan Pablo Montoya	Team Penske	Chevrolet	Report
2	New Orleans	(Colombia) Juan Pablo Montoya	(New Zealand) Scott Dixon	(Colombia) Juan Pablo Montoya	(Canada) James Hinchcliffe	Schmidt Peterson Motorsports	Honda	Report
3	Long Beach	(Brazil) Hélio Castroneves	(Monaco) Stefano Coletti	(New Zealand) Scott Dixon	(New Zealand) Scott Dixon	Chip Ganassi Racing	Chevrolet	Report
4	Birmingham	(Brazil) Hélio Castroneves	(United States) Ryan Hunter-Reay	(United States) Josef Newgarden	(United States) Josef Newgarden	CFH Racing	Chevrolet	Report
5	Indianapolis GP	(Australia) Will Power	(Canada) James Hinchcliffe	(Australia) Will Power	(Australia) Will Power	Team Penske	Chevrolet	Report
6	Indianapolis 500	(New Zealand) Scott Dixon	(United States) Charlie Kimball	(New Zealand) Scott Dixon	(Colombia) Juan Pablo Montoya	Team Penske	Chevrolet	Report
7	Detroit 1	(Australia) Will Power	(United Kingdom) Jack Hawksworth	(United States) Marco Andretti	(Colombia) Carlos Muñoz	Andretti Autosport	Honda	Report
8	Detroit 2	(Colombia) Juan Pablo Montoya	(France) Sébastien Bourdais	(Colombia) Juan Pablo Montoya	(France) Sébastien Bourdais	KV Racing Technology	Chevrolet	Report
9	Texas	(Australia) Will Power	(Australia) Will Power	(New Zealand) Scott Dixon	(New Zealand) Scott Dixon	Chip Ganassi Racing	Chevrolet	Report
10	Toronto	(Australia) Will Power	(Brazil) Hélio Castroneves	(Australia) Will Power (United States) Josef Newgarden	(United States) Josef Newgarden	CFH Racing	Chevrolet	Report
11	Fontana	(France) Simon Pagenaud	(Japan) Takuma Sato	(Australia) Will Power	(United States) Graham Rahal	Rahal Letterman Lanigan Racing	Honda	Report
12	Milwaukee	(United States) Josef Newgarden	(Brazil) Hélio Castroneves	(France) Sébastien Bourdais	(France) Sébastien Bourdais	KV Racing Technology	Chevrolet	Report
13	Iowa	(Brazil) Hélio Castroneves	(New Zealand) Scott Dixon	(United States) Josef Newgarden	(United States) Ryan Hunter-Reay	Andretti Autosport	Honda	Report
14	Mid-Ohio	(New Zealand) Scott Dixon	(Australia) Will Power	(United States) Graham Rahal	(United States) Graham Rahal	Rahal Letterman Lanigan Racing	Honda	Report
15	Pocono	(Brazil) Hélio Castroneves	(Colombia) Juan Pablo Montoya	(United States) Josef Newgarden	(United States) Ryan Hunter-Reay	Andretti Autosport	Honda	Report
16	Sonoma	(Australia) Will Power	(Brazil) Hélio Castroneves	(New Zealand) Scott Dixon	(New Zealand) Scott Dixon	Chip Ganassi Racing	Chevrolet	Report

== Race summaries ==
=== Round 1: St. Petersburg ===
The season opener at St. Petersburg was also the debut of unique aero kits for Honda and Chevrolet. Apprehension amongst the teams going into the race revolved around the complex, elaborate, and seemingly fragile front wings, and the lack of adequate replacement parts. The concerns were not unfounded, as dozens of on-track contacts throughout the field damaged countless wing components.

Will Power won the pole position, leading a Team Penske sweep of the first four positions on the grid. Power took the lead at the start, and led 75 laps. During the final round of pit stops, Juan Pablo Montoya grabbed the lead after he managed a quicker pit stop than Power. In the closing laps, Power chased down Montoya, and narrowed the gap to less than a second with 11 laps to go. Power tried to pass Montoya for the lead in turn 10, but the two cars touched, damaging Power's front wing. Montoya held the lead, and went on to win, his first road course victory in IndyCar racing since 1999.

=== Round 2: New Orleans ===
IndyCar made its first visit to NOLA Motorsports Park for the second round of the series. Lightning during qualifying in the middle of Round 1B cancelled the entire session, with the grid determined by entrant points, placing Juan Pablo Montoya on pole courtesy of having won the opening race in St. Petersburg. He was joined on the front row by Penske teammate Will Power.

The weather had eased on race day though not completely cleared, seeing the race begin in wet conditions. Montoya led the race early as conditions improved prompting a number of drivers to gamble on a switch to dry tires. Tony Kanaan and Ryan Hunter-Reay both stopped after 11 laps, a decision which proved too early as Kanaan spun off soon after. Conditions rapidly improved though and two laps later the leaders pitted for dry tires which promoted James Hinchcliffe into the lead, courtesy of an earlier stop. From there on the race was dictated by a series of caution periods as the drivers continued to struggle in the mixed conditions, the final caution period coming as Hunter-Reay, Sébastien Bourdais and Simon Pagenaud crashed together.

The series had announced a 1-hour and 45 minute time limit in the event of a wet race. Due to this time limit being reached in addition to the cautions, the race ended under yellow following the 3-car crash involving Hunter-Reay, Bourdais, and Pagenaud. Hinchcliffe won the race.

=== Round 3: Long Beach ===
Hélio Castroneves won the pole position with a track record of 1:06.7442, beating Sébastien Bourdais's mark set in Champ Car in 2006. Castroneves's Penske teammate Juan Pablo Montoya started alongside on the front row. At the start, Castroneves got the jump, and led into turn one.

During the first sequence of green flag pit stops on lap 29, Castoneves was briefly held in his pit box to avoid collision with Tony Kanaan, who was entering the stall just ahead. The delay cost Castroneves valuable track position, and allowed Scott Dixon to take over the lead. During the second round of pit stops on lap 55, Dixon was narrowly able to hold the lead, and cruised to victory, his first career win at Long Beach. With Dixon comfortably out in front, and Castroneves in second, the closing laps focused on a furious four-car battle for third place, led by Juan Pablo Montoya and Simon Pagenaud. Fifth place went to Tony Kanaan.

=== Round 4: Birmingham ===
With a second consecutive pole position, Hélio Castroneves took the front row with a time of 1:07.1925 alongside teammate Will Power, while a third-place effort by Simon Pagenaud made it another Penske 1-2-3 qualifying lock-out. Josef Newgarden took his first career victory, the fourth different winner in the four races thus far in the season.

Castroneves led early in the race, but lost the lead on lap 19 after another pit stop problem. The right-front tire changer lost a wheel nut, and that allowed Josef Newgarden to come to the lead. In the second half, Newgarden led, Scott Dixon was second, and Castroneves was third, but Graham Rahal was on a different pit strategy. As the leaders were attempting to save fuel and make it to the finish, Rahal pit on lap 70. With a full load of fuel, and new red option tires, Rahal went on a spirited charge to catch the leaders. He shaved 18 seconds off of Newgarden's lead, and passed Scott Dixon for second on the final lap. Newgarden held off the charge and won his first ever IndyCar race by just 2.2 seconds.

Castroneves ran out of fuel on the final lap, forcing him to pit, and he dropped to 15th. Will Power recovered from a collision exiting the pits (and subsequent drive-through penalty) on lap 24 to come home fourth. With Castroneves dropping to 15th at the finish, teammate Juan Pablo Montoya maintained the championship lead.

=== Round 5: Grand Prix of Indianapolis ===
Will Power won the pole position for the second annual Grand Prix of Indianapolis, continuing a dominating trend in 2015 for Penske Racing during qualifying. Penske cars qualified 1st, 3rd, 4th, and 5th, with Ganassi's Scott Dixon (2nd) situated on the outside of the front row.

At the start, a multi-car tangle in turn one saw Scott Dixon spin out in front of the entire field. Hélio Castroneves (in his milestone 300th Indy car start) was involved in contact, as was Josef Newgarden, and others. Will Power took the lead and dominated the race, leading 65 of 82 laps. Power became the fifth different winner in as many races for 2015.

=== Round 6: Indianapolis 500 ===
2008 winner Scott Dixon started from pole position for the 99th running of the Indianapolis 500. In a Three way shootout over the 14 remaining laps with Will Power and Scott Dixon, Juan Pablo Montoya was crowned with his second Indianapolis 500 title. During post qualifying practice on May 18, James Hinchcliffe had a life-threatening crash sidelining him from the remainder of the season. He would recover to return in 2016.

=== Round 7: Detroit (Sat.) ===
A southwesterly cold front drenching the circuit for Saturday's race 1 of the Belle Isle Detroit Grand Prix, it was Will Power on pole position. In a wet race on the composite circuit, Carlos Munoz took his first IndyCar win, lapping through 9th place in the process. Runner-up was Marco Andretti; Simon Pagenaud finished 3rd.

=== Round 8: Detroit (Sun.) ===
The remnant of yesterday's cold front lingered in a fog over a soaking wet Belle Isle circuit for Sunday's race 2 of the Detroit Grand Prix. Qualification scrubbed, the grid formed up on the basis of driver points, Juan Pablo Montoya on pole position, with Will Power alongside, row 1. The first 37 laps were run caution free. Yet, 50% of the last 31 laps run under caution, seldom were there ever more than three consecutive green flag laps run, over the remaining portion of the race. The driver hasn't gotten his strategy correct, Sébastien Bourdais led to the stripe with 6 laps to go, gapped the field, and earned his first win of the 2015 season, Takuma Sato finished 2nd, Graham Rahal - 3rd.

=== Round 9: Texas ===
Under a clear sky, high heat, and 63% humidity, 23 cars took to the D-shaped 1.5 mile Texas Motor Speedway circuit with Will Power on pole position. Ganassi drivers Scott Dixon and Tony Kanaan finished first and second respectively, 7.8 seconds apart, with second-place Kanaan about 10 seconds ahead of third-place Hélio Castroneves.

=== Round 10: Toronto ===
With light rain as the field approached for the green flag, starter's orders called for a mandatory single-file rolling start. Will Power earned pole position; Josef Newgarden won the race, holding off his CFH Racing teammate Luca Filippi by 1.4 seconds, ahead of third-place Castroneves, fourth-place Power and Sébastien Bourdais in fifth.

=== Round 11: Fontana ===
Simon Pagenaud won pole position, followed by Hélio Castroneves, Marco Andretti, Ed Carpenter, Juan Montoya and Tony Kanaan. The lead would subsequently alternate 80 times throughout the 500-mile race, an IndyCar Series record. On lap 241, Sato collided into Will Power, taking them both out of the race. This would set up a late sprint to the finish when the green flag waved on lap 247. On the penultimate lap of the race, the final incident of the day occurred when Sage Karam and Juan Pablo Montoya pinched Ryan Hunter-Reay into Ryan Briscoe, the latter of whom was sent airborne at a speed of 210 miles per hour (340 km/h). This allowed Rahal to complete the final two laps to the checkered flag under caution, for his first win of the year. This would be the final IndyCar race at this track as it was demolished in October 2023 for redevelopment.

=== Round 12: Milwaukee ===
Josef Newgarden picked up his first career pole in the Verizon Indycar Series. The first caution didn't came until 114 when James Jakes lost an engine in turn 1. The second caution didn't fly until 131 when Ryan Briscoe spun and hit his country mate Will Power in turn 4. The 3rd and final caution came in lap 222 when Justin Wilson lost an engine in turn 1. Sébastien Bourdais eventually lapped the entire field. He managed to hold off Hélio Castroneves and Graham Rahal to pick up his 2nd win of the year. Sébastien Bourdais got his first oval win since 2006 and the 34th of his career, tying Al Unser Jr. IndyCar would then go on hiatus from this track until the 2024 season.

=== Round 13: Iowa ===
Hélio Castroneves picked up his 3rd pole at Iowa. The start was waved off when Hélio Castroneves jumped his country mate and friend Tony Kanaan. The first caution waved on lap 10 when Championship leader Juan Pablo Montoya crashed in turn 2. The second caution came on lap 25 when Charlie Kimball and Stefano Coletti got together in turn 3. The third caution waved on lap 108 when Justin Wilson got up high in turn 2, eventually cutting a tire down. The fourth caution came out on lap 172 when Charlie Kimball crashed in turn 2. The fifth caution came on lap 195 when Stefano Coletti crashed in turn 2. The sixth and final caution waved on lap 262 when Takuma Sato hit the wall in turn 2. Ryan Hunter-Reay held off Josef Newgarden and Sage Karam to pick up his first win of the season. Ed Carpenter got out of his car after the race and confronted the 20 year old rookie driver from Nazareth Pennsylvania Sage Karam.

=== Round 14: Mid-Ohio ===
Scott Dixon captured the pole at Mid Ohio, his 2nd pole of the season. he was followed by Will Power, Sébastien Bourdais, Hélio Castroneves, Josef Newgarden, and Charlie Kimball. Early on Josef Newgarden ran Will Power off track in turn 4, the first caution came out when Charlie Kimball spun in turn 6, after getting his tire cut down from Will Power. The first restart came on lap 7. The 2nd caution came out when Stefano Coletti spun Takuma Sato in turn 4, and there was debris in various locations around the track. The next restart came on lap 26. The 3rd caution came when Sage Karam spun between turns 4 & 5. The next restart came on lap 70. The final caution came when Rodolfo González spun Charlie Kimball in turn 4. The final restart came on lap 84 when Graham Rahal held off a hard charging Justin Wilson for the win. Graham Rahal picked up his 2nd win of the season and 3rd of his career tying Ed Carpenter for wins, he was followed by Justin Wilson and Simon Pagenaud. Graham Rahal gained 33 points on Championship Leader Juan Pablo Montoya. The margin from 1st to 2nd in the championship was from 42 to 9.

=== Round 15: Pocono ===
Hélio Castroneves picked up his 4th pole of the season, and first at Pocono Raceway. The start was waved off twice when Hélio Castroneves jumped his teammate Simon Pagenaud. They finally waved the green flag on lap 2. The 2nd caution came when Jack Hawksworth lost a tire in turn 1, eventually Sage Karam and Juan Pablo Montoya dodged the lost tire from Jack Hawksworth. The restart came on lap 36. The 3rd caution came when Sébastien Bourdais wrecked in turn 2. The restart came on lap 42, the 4th caution came when Jack Hawksworth and Charlie Kimball getting together in turn 1. The next restart came on lap 92, the 5th caution came when Graham Rahal and Tristan Vautier crashed in turn 3. The next restart came on lap 103, the 6th caution came when debris from Ed Carpenter had contact from James Jakes, eventually the debris was on the frontstretch. The next restart came on lap 114, the 7th caution came when Tony Kanaan spun and hit the wall in turn 2. The next restart came on lap 138, the 8th caution came when Marco Andretti spun and hit wall in turn 2. The next restart came on lap 148, the 9th caution (season's record) came when a fox ran from the infield and through the catchfence. The next restart came on lap 166. The 10th caution came when Hélio Castroneves crashed in turn 1. The next restart came on lap 172. The 11th caution came when rookie Sage Karam spun and hit the wall in turn 1. As debris was strewn from the car, the nosecone section made contact with Justin Wilson's helmet inflicting severe brain damage. The unconscious Wilson then crashed into the infield at turn 1. The final restart came on lap 193, the 12th and final caution came on lap 197 when Rookie Gabby Chaves lost an engine. Ryan Hunter-Reay picked up his 2nd win of the season, and 2nd out of the last 3 races, he held off Josef Newgarden and Juan Pablo Montoya for the win. The race set a new record of caution flags flew at an Indycar race, the record was previously held by the 2007 Indianapolis 500. On August 24, Justin Wilson succumbed to his injuries 24 hours after the race. He had been in a coma following the injury he had received during the race. His death marked the first fatality for the Dallara DW12 and the first since Dan Wheldon at Las Vegas Motor Speedway during the IZOD IndyCar World Championship.

=== Round 16: Sonoma ===
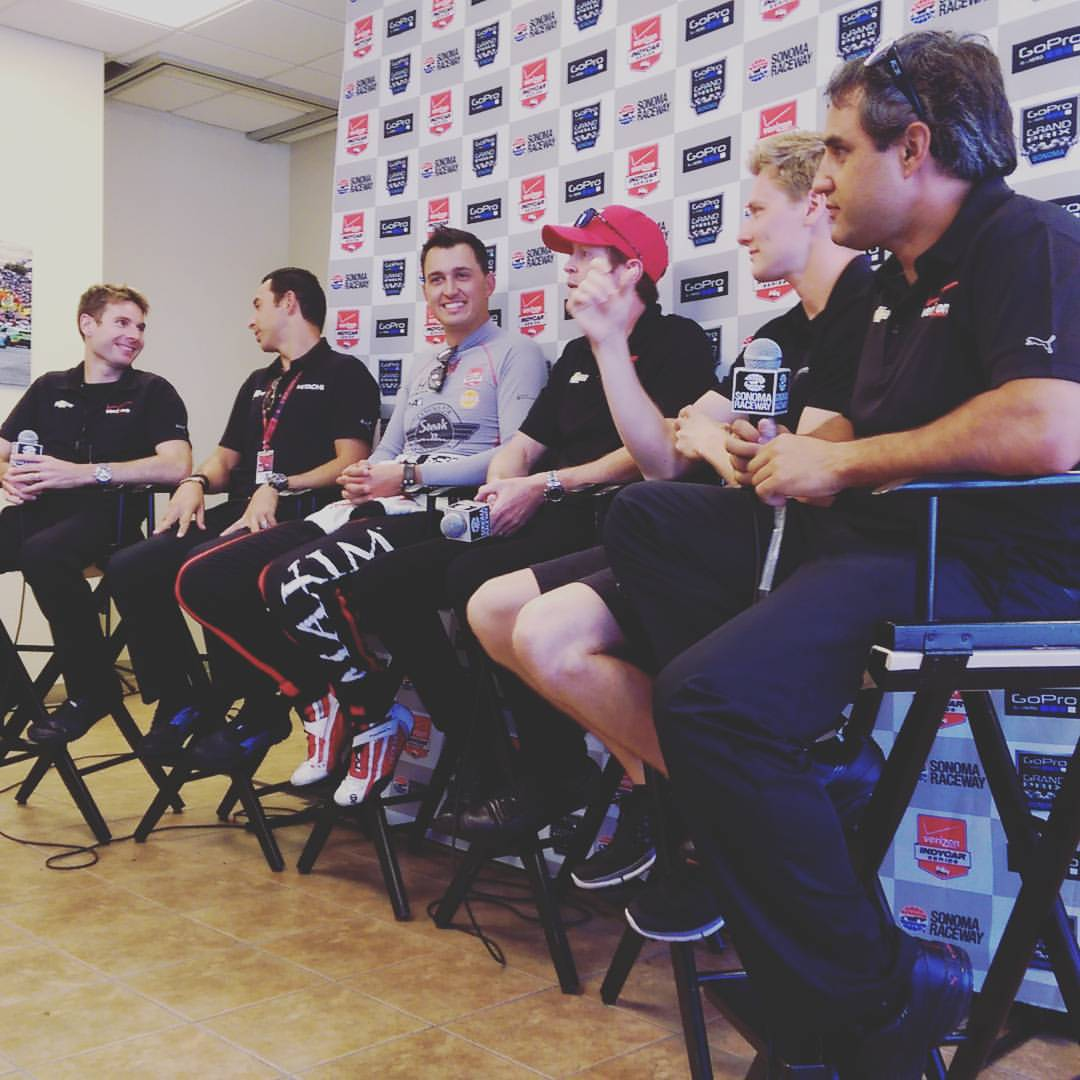
(l-r) Will Power, Hélio Castroneves, Graham Rahal, Scott Dixon, Josef Newgarden and Juan Pablo Montoya in a press conference at Sonoma Raceway

Heading into the final race of the 2015 season, six drivers had a mathematical chance of winning the championship. Those drivers were Juan Pablo Montoya, Graham Rahal, Scott Dixon, Will Power, Hélio Castroneves, and Josef Newgarden. Championship Contender Will Power picks up his 6th pole of the season, 5th at Sonoma, and his 35th pole in his career. He was followed by the other 4 championship contenders Newgarden (2nd), Montoya (5th), and Rahal (6th). The drivers who are not in the championship started in the top 6: Ryan Hunter-Reay (3rd) and Simon Pagenaud (4th). Other championship contenders Dixon started 9th and Castroneves started 15th. The race ran the first 32 laps without a caution until Luca Filippi brought out the first caution when he slow on the track. The first restart came on lap 38, it didn't take long to get the 2nd caution came on lap 39 when Championship Leader Juan Pablo Montoya took out his championship rival and teammate Will Power in turn 4. The next restart came on lap 42, the 3rd caution came on lap 65 when James Jakes crashed in turn 9. The next to last restart came on lap 69. The fourth and final caution came on lap 71 when Jack Hawksworth spun Carlos Muñoz in turn 7. The final restart came on lap 73, late in the race Sébastien Bourdais spun Championship Contender Graham Rahal in turn 7 and there was no caution for that because Graham Rahal got the car going, Bourdais got a drive thru penalty for avoidable contact. After the race Rahal got out of his car and went to confront Bourdais. Dixon won his third win at Sonoma Raceway, third of the year, and back to back wins at Sonoma Raceway like Will Power did in 2010 and 2011. Scott Dixon won his 4th championship tying Dario Franchitti, Sébastien Bourdais and Mario Andretti for U.S. open wheel titles. Dixon was followed by Ryan Hunter-Reay and Charlie Kimball. Scott Dixon won the tiebreaker over Juan Pablo Montoya because Dixon had 3 wins to Montoya's 2. This race marked the final race of eight-time race winner Ryan Briscoe's career as he would not return to Schmidt Peterson Motorsports for 2016, therefore bringing an end to his 11-season career.

== Points standings ==
- Ties are broken by number of wins, followed by number of 2nds, 3rds, etc., then by number of pole positions, followed by number of times qualified 2nd, etc.

=== Driver standings ===
- One championship point is awarded to any driver for each lap they lead during a race. Two additional championship points are awarded to the driver who leads most laps during a race.
- At all races except the Indy 500, the number 1 qualifier earns one point.
- Entrant-initiated engine change-outs will result in the loss of ten points.
- Qualification points were not awarded for the Indy 500 due to last minute regulatory changes.

Pos	Driver	STP	NOL	LBH	BAR	IGP	INDY	BEL		TMS	TOR	CAL	MIL	IOW	MOH	POC	SON	Pts
1	(New Zealand) Scott Dixon	15	11	1*	3	10	**4***	5	20	1*	8	6	7	18	**4**	9	1*	556
2	(Colombia) Juan Pablo Montoya	1	**5***^{c}	3	14	3	1	10	**10***^{c}	4	7	4	4	24	11	3	6	556
3	(Australia) Will Power	**2***	7	20	4	**1***	2	**4**	18	**13**	**4***	19*	22	10	14	4	**7**	493
4	(United States) Graham Rahal	11	8	11	2	2	5	23	3	15	9	1	3	4	1*	20	18	490
5	(Brazil) Hélio Castroneves	4	2	**2**	**15**	6	7	6	19	3	3	23	2	**11**	15	**16**	15	453
6	(United States) Ryan Hunter-Reay	7	19	13	5	11	15	13	8	18	19	16	13	1	7	1	2	436
7	(United States) Josef Newgarden	12	9	7	1*	20	9	8	21	21	1*	21	**5**	2*	13	2*	21	431
8	(Brazil) Tony Kanaan	3	6	5	13	7	26	20	13	2	6	2	6	21	5	19	4	431
9	(United States) Marco Andretti	10	13	8	10	16	6	2*	5	5	13	3	8	7	10	18	11	429
10	(France) Sébastien Bourdais	6	21	6	8	4	11	14	1	14	5	14	1*	9	17	23	20	406
11	(France) Simon Pagenaud	5	20	4	9	25	10	3	14	11	11	**9**	9	14	3	7	16	384
12	(United States) Charlie Kimball	21	14	15	12	5	3	22	11	7	20	8	12	22	23	12	3	372
13	(Colombia) Carlos Muñoz	14	12	9	6	13	20	1	23	6	22	11	15	5	9	5	22	349
14	(Japan) Takuma Sato	13	22	18	17	9	13	11	2	16	10	18	14	19	24	6	8	323
15	(Colombia) Gabby Chaves RY	17	15	16	16	15	16	18	9	10	15	20	11	16	12	11	14	281
16	(United Kingdom) James Jakes	22	3	19	22	18	18	12	15	9	21	7	23	15	16	10	25	257
17	(United Kingdom) Jack Hawksworth	8	24	14	21	23	24	7	7	23	14	10	17	13	8	22	19	256
18	(Australia) Ryan Briscoe						12			8		15	21	8	18	8	5	205
19	(Monaco) Stefano Coletti R	20	17	23	19	8	25	15	16	19	23	12	20	20	19	24	17	203
20	(United States) Sage Karam R	19	18		18		32	16	12	12		5	19	3	22	14		197
21	(Italy) Luca Filippi	9	10	22	11	14		9	17		2				21		24	182
22	(France) Tristan Vautier						28	17	4	20	17	17	16	12	6	21	23	172
23	(Canada) James Hinchcliffe	16	1	12	7	12	Wth											129
24	(United Kingdom) Justin Wilson					24	21						18	17	2	15^{†}		108
25	(Colombia) Sebastián Saavedra			10		17	23				16						13	96
26	(Venezuela) Rodolfo González R				20			21	22		18				20		9	94
27	(United States) Ed Carpenter						30			22		22	10	6		17		88
28	(United States) Conor Daly R			17			33	19	6		12							81
29	(United Kingdom) Pippa Mann						22			17		13	24	23		13		76
30	(Switzerland) Simona de Silvestro	18	4				19											66
31	(United States) J. R. Hildebrand					21	8											57
32	(Spain) Oriol Servià						29										12	46
33	(Russia) Mikhail Aleshin																10	40
34	(Italy) Francesco Dracone R	23	23	21	23	22												38
35	(United States) Townsend Bell						14											32
36	(Colombia) Carlos Huertas	24	16			19	Wth											31
37	(Canada) Alex Tagliani						17											27
38	(Australia) James Davison R						27											10
39	(United States) Bryan Clauson R						31											10
—	(United States) Buddy Lazier						DNQ											0
—	(United States) Rocky Moran Jr. R			Wth														0
Pos	Driver	STP	NOL	LBH	BAR	IGP	INDY	BEL		TMS	TOR	CAL	MIL	IOW	MOH	POC	SON	Pts

Color	Result
Gold	Winner
Silver	2nd place
Bronze	3rd place
Green	4th & 5th place
Light Blue	6th–10th place
Dark Blue	Finished (Outside Top 10)
Purple	Did not finish
Red	Did not qualify (DNQ)
Brown	Withdrawn (Wth)
Black	Disqualified (DSQ)
White	Did Not Start (DNS)
White	Race abandoned (C)
Blank	Did not participate

**In-line notation**
**Bold**	Pole position (1 point; except Indy)
Italics	Ran fastest race lap
*	Led most race laps (2 points)
DNS	Any driver who qualifies but does not start (DNS), earns half the points had they taken part.
^{c}	Qualifying canceled no bonus point awarded
^{†}	Fatal accident
RY Rookie of the Year
R Rookie

=== Entrant standings ===
- Based on the entrant, used for oval qualifications order, and starting grids when qualifying is cancelled.
- Only full-time entrants, and at-large part-time entrants shown.

Pos	Driver	STP	NOL	LBH	BAR	IGP	INDY	BEL		TMS	TOR	CAL	MIL	IOW	MOH	POC	SON	Pts
1	#9 Chip Ganassi Racing	15	11	1*	3	10	**4***	5	20	1*	8	6	7	18	**4**	9	1*	556
2	#2 Team Penske	1	**5***^{1}	3	14	3	1	10	**10***^{1}	4	7	4	4	24	11	3	6	556
3	#12 Team Penske	**2***	7	20	4	**1***	2	**4**	18	**13**	**4***	19*	22	10	14	4	**7**	493
4	#15 Rahal Letterman Lanigan Racing	11	8	11	2	2	5	23	3	15	9	1	3	4	1*	20	18	490
5	#3 Team Penske	4	2	**2**	**15**	6	7	6	19	3	3	23	2	**11**	15	**16**	15	453
6	#28 Andretti Autosport	7	19	13	5	11	15	13	8	18	19	16	13	1	7	1	2	436
7	#67 CFH Racing	12	9	7	1*	20	9	8	21	21	1*	21	**5**	2*	13	2*	21	431
8	#10 Chip Ganassi Racing	3	6	5	13	7	26	20	13	2	6	2	6	21	5	19	4	431
9	#27 Andretti Autosport	10	13	8	10	16	6	2*	5	5	13	3	8	7	10	18	11	429
10	#11 KVSH Racing	6	21	6	8	4	11	14	1	14	5	14	1*	9	17	23	20	406
11	#5 Schmidt Peterson Motorsports	16	1	12	7	12	12	19	6	8	12	15	21	8	18	8	5	392
12	#22 Team Penske	5	20	4	9	25	10	3	14	11	11	**9**	9	14	3	7	16	384
13	#83 Chip Ganassi Racing	21	14	15	12	5	3	22	11	7	20	8	12	22	23	12	3	372
14	#26 Andretti Autosport	14	12	9	6	13	20	1	23	6	22	11	15	5	9	5	22	349
15	#14 A. J. Foyt Enterprises	13	22	18	17	9	13	11	2	16	10	18	14	19	24	6	8	323
16	#98 Bryan Herta Autosport	17	15	16	16	15	16	18	9	10	15	20	11	16	12	11	14	281
17	#8 Chip Ganassi Racing	19	18	10	18	17	32	16	12	12	16	5	19	3	22	14	13	279
18	#20 CFH Racing	9	10	22	11	14	30	9	17	22	2	22	10	6	21	17	24	270
19	#7 Schmidt Peterson Motorsports	22	3	19	22	18	18	12	15	9	21	7	23	15	16	10	25	257
20	#41 A. J. Foyt Enterprises	8	24	14	21	23	24	7	7	23	14	10	17	13	8	22	19	256
21	#19 Dale Coyne Racing	23	23	21	23	22	27	17	4	20	17	17	16	12	6	21	23	210
22	#18 Dale Coyne Racing	24	16	17	20	19	28	21	22	17	18	13	24	23	20	13	9	208
23	#4 KV Racing Technology	20	17	23	19	8	25	15	16	19	23	12	20	20	19	24	17	203
24	#25 Andretti Autosport	18	4			24	21						18	17	2	15	12	188
Pos	Driver	STP	NOL	LBH	BAR	IGP	INDY	BEL		TMS	TOR	CAL	MIL	IOW	MOH	POC	SON	Pts

=== Manufacturer standings ===
Pos	Manufacturer	STP	NOL	LBH	BAR	IGP	INDY	BEL		TMS	TOR	CAL	MIL	IOW	MOH	POC	SON	Bonus	Penalties	Points
1	Chevrolet	1	2	1	1	1	1	3	1	1	1	2	1	2	3	2	1	80	480	1645
1	Chevrolet	2	5	2	3	3	2	4	10	2	2	4	2	3	4	3	3	80	480	1645
1	Chevrolet	3	6	3	4	4	3	5	11	3	3	5	4	6	5	4	4	80	480	1645
1	Chevrolet	**128***	**100***^{1}	**128***	**120***	**120***	**252***	**98**	**91***^{1}	**128***	**128***	**105***	**125***	**106***	**98**	**110***	**237***	80	480	1645
2	Honda	7	1	8	2	2	5	1	2	5	9	1	3	1	1	1	2	120	560	1179
2	Honda	8	3	9	5	9	6	2	3	6	10	3	8	4	2	5	5	120	560	1179
2	Honda	10	4	11	6	11	12	7	4	8	12	7	11	5	6	6	8	120	560	1179
2	Honda	70	117	65	98	81	152	118*	107	82	60	111	78	112	120*	108	188	120	560	1179

- The top three finishing drivers from each manufacturer in each race/qualifying score championship points for their respective manufacturer, provided they were using one of their four allotted engines.
- Two additional points are awarded to the manufacturer if one of their entrants leads most laps of a race.
- At all races except the Indy 500, the manufacturer who qualifies on pole earns one point.
- Manufacturers will earn ten points for each engine reaching the 2500-mile change-out threshold. Manufacturers will lose twenty points for each engine failing to reach the change-out threshold, or for a non-minor repair requiring a component change.
- A tie in points is broken, by number of wins, followed by number of 2nds, 3rds, etc., then by number of pole positions, followed by number of times qualified 2nd, etc.
