= Indy Grand Prix of Louisiana =

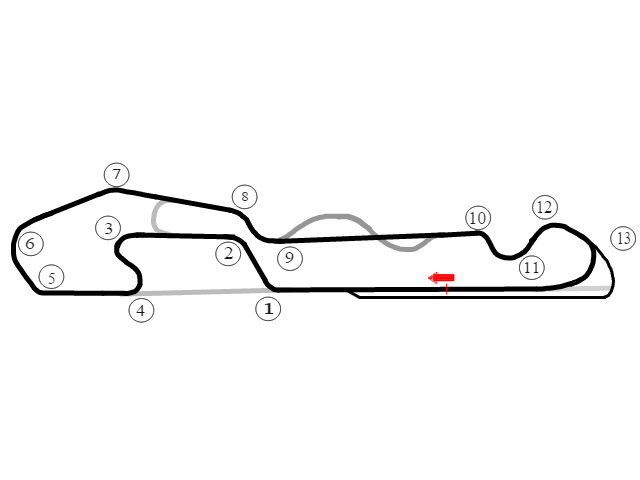

IndyCar Series
- Venue: NOLA Motorsports Park
- Location: Avondale, Louisiana; 29°53′1″N 90°11′52″W
- First race: 2015
- Last race: 2015
- Distance: 205.5 miles (330.7 km)
- Laps: 75

Circuit information
- Surface: Asphalt
- Length: 2.74 mi (4.41 km)
- Turns: 13

The Indy Grand Prix of Louisiana was an IndyCar Series race held at NOLA Motorsports Park in Avondale, Louisiana in 2015.

The only race held in 2015 was plagued by heavy rain, which turned much of the facility in a quagmire. Qualifying was cancelled, and the race was shortened with most of the laps run under caution. After the race, legal disputes erupted involving the promoter, the track, and other related parties. The event was a huge money-loser, and attracted only 10,000 spectators, in part due to the poor weather. Despite an initial three-year contract, the event was cancelled after only one running. This was the first major auto race held in the New Orleans area since the Grand Prix du Mardi Gras took place on the streets around the Louisiana Superdome as part of the 1995 IMSA GT Championship.

James Hinchcliffe was declared the winner of the 2015 race, just weeks before he suffered near-life-threatening injuries at Indianapolis.

== Past winners ==
Season	Date	Driver	Team	Chassis	Engine	Race Distance		Race Time	Average Speed (mph)	Report	Ref
Season	Date	Driver	Team	Chassis	Engine	Laps	Miles (km)	Race Time	Average Speed (mph)	Report	Ref
2015	April 12	(Canada) James Hinchcliffe	Schmidt Peterson Motorsports	Dallara	Honda	47*	128.78 (207.251)	1:47:19	71.995	Report	

- 2015: Race started late due to rain; race shortened due to time limit.
