= 2017 Honda Indy 200 =

(United States) 2017 Mid-Ohio
Race details
13th round of the 2017 IndyCar Series season
← Previous race	Next race →
- Date: July 30, 2017
- Official name: Honda Indy 200
- Location: Mid-Ohio Sports Car Course
- Course: Permanent racing facility 2.258 mi / 3.634 km
- Distance: 90 laps 203.2 mi / 327.02 km

Pole position
- Driver: (Australia) Will Power (Team Penske)
- Time: 1:04.1720

Fastest lap
- Driver: (United States) Alexander Rossi (Andretti Herta Autosport)
- Time: 1:05.9696 (on lap 42 of 90)

Podium
- First: (United States) Josef Newgarden (Team Penske)
- Second: (Australia) Will Power (Team Penske)
- Third: (United States) Graham Rahal (Rahal Letterman Lanigan Racing)

The 2017 Honda Indy 200 was an IndyCar Series event held on July 30, 2017, at the Mid-Ohio Sports Car Course in Lexington, Ohio. The race served as the 13th round of the 2017 IndyCar Series season. Australian Will Power started on pole position for the race, while his American teammate Josef Newgarden took victory.

== Qualifying ==
Qualifying was held on Saturday, July 29. Will Power, for the third time at the track, qualified on pole, recording a time of 1:04.1720. Alongside him on the front row was his Team Penske teammate Josef Newgarden, while Takuma Sato qualified third. Rounding out the fast six qualifiers were Graham Rahal, Hélio Castroneves, and Scott Dixon. One incident occurred in qualifying when Tony Kanaan spun in turn two, bringing out yellow flags. As per IndyCar rules, Kanaan's fastest lap from the session was thrown out, relegating him to a 17th place start.

== Race ==
The race was held on Sunday, July 30. The start of the race saw the top five qualifiers remain in grid order, while Simon Pagenaud managed to jump Scott Dixon in the first turn. Further back in the field, some drivers were able to make larger moves, such as Marco Andretti moving up from 14th to 10th. The opening laps were mostly uneventful aside from pit stops, as some, such as Carlos Muñoz and Max Chilton on lap 5. On lap 12, Alexander Rossi pitted having been the highest running driver using the softer option tires. He was followed the next lap by Ryan Hunter-Reay, Charlie Kimball, and James Hinchcliffe. At the same time as these pit stops, however, the battle for the lead suddenly heated up, with Josef Newgarden managing to pass Will Power on lap 13. Two laps later, third place exchanged hands, as Graham Rahal managed to make a pass on Takuma Sato.

The leaders made their stops shortly after, reemerging in the same order. During the sequence, a minor incident occurred when Hunter-Reay spun while attempting to pass Sato and Hélio Castroneves after their pit stops. No caution was waved for this. This order remained intact through to the next round of pit stops, following which the running order was Newgarden, Power, Rahal, Rossi, Pagenaud. On lap 55, Pagenaud managed to move around Rossi to take over the fourth spot. This order remained until the last round of pit stops which began at lap 62. Newgarden remained out front by a healthy margin of over 12 seconds after the stops.

On lap 67, Newgarden's gap was erased when the race's only caution period came due to Ed Jones spinning and stalling his car at turn 9. The restart came at the end of lap 70, with Newgarden's position protected by back marker Esteban Gutiérrez who had become wedged between Newgarden and Power. This allowed Newgarden to easily pull away and ensure his second consecutive victory and his third of the season. Behind him, Power managed to hold on to second place, despite heavy pressure from Graham Rahal in the closing laps. Fourth place when to Simon Pagenaud, while Takuma Sato managed to move back into the top five on the final restart to round out the top positions. All cars were listed as running at the end of the race.

Newgarden's victory allowed him to jump to the top of the points standings with only four races remaining in the season, placing him ahead of his teammate Hélio Castroneves and Scott Dixon.

This race featured no DNFs.

== Results ==
Key	Meaning
R	Rookie
W	Past winner

=== Qualifying ===
Pos	No.	Name	Grp.	Round 1	Round 2	Firestone Fast 6
1	12	(Australia) Will Power	2	1:04.2485	1:04.2505	1:04.1720
2	2	(United States) Josef Newgarden	2	1:04.2161	1:04.1920	1"04.3067
3	26	(Japan) Takuma Sato	1	1:04.3734	1:04.1847	1:04.6792
4	15	(United States) Graham Rahal W	2	1:04.1938	1:04.0828	1:04.7959
5	3	(Brazil) Hélio Castroneves W	1	1:04.4144	1:04.2536	1:04.8485
6	9	(New Zealand) Scott Dixon W	2	1:04.4104	1:04.2560	1:05.1927
7	1	(France) Simon Pagenaud W	1	1:04.3597	1:04.3008	
8	5	(Canada) James Hinchcliffe	1	1:04.8213	1:04.3784	
9	98	(United States) Alexander Rossi	2	1:04.3150	1:04.4906	
10	28	(United States) Ryan Hunter-Reay	2	1:04.4632	1:04.4928	
11	4	(United States) Conor Daly	1	1:04.9627	1:04.8745	
12	18	(Mexico) Esteban Gutiérrez R	1	1:04.7785	1:05.0368	
13	83	(United States) Charlie Kimball W	1	1:04.9930		
14	27	(United States) Marco Andretti	2	1:04.5929		
15	19	(United Arab Emirates) Ed Jones R	1	1:05.0337		
16	20	(United States) Spencer Pigot	2	1:04.6186		
17	10	(Brazil) Tony Kanaan	1	1:05.3200		
18	8	(United Kingdom) Max Chilton	2	1:04.8603		
19	21	(United States) J. R. Hildebrand	1	1:05.3382		
20	14	(Colombia) Carlos Muñoz	2	1:04.9440		
21	7	(Russia) Mikhail Aleshin	2	1:05.2441		
OFFICIAL BOX SCORE

Source for individual rounds:

=== Race results ===
Pos	No.	Driver	Team	Engine	Laps	Time/Retired	Pit Stops	Grid	Laps Led	Pts.^{1}
1	2	(United States) Josef Newgarden	Team Penske	Chevrolet	90	1:46:19.5989	3	2	73	53
2	12	(Australia) Will Power	Team Penske	Chevrolet	90	+5.1556	3	1	14	42
3	15	(United States) Graham Rahal W	Rahal Letterman Lanigan Racing	Honda	90	+6.3129	3	4	3	36
4	1	(France) Simon Pagenaud W	Team Penske	Chevrolet	90	+6.8807	3	7		32
5	26	(Japan) Takuma Sato	Andretti Autosport	Honda	90	+7.3092	3	3		30
6	98	(United States) Alexander Rossi	Andretti Herta Autosport	Honda	90	+9.0266	3	9		28
7	3	(Brazil) Hélio Castroneves W	Team Penske	Chevrolet	90	+11.6809	3	5		26
8	28	(United States) Ryan Hunter-Reay	Andretti Autosport	Honda	90	+12.3623	3	10		24
9	9	(New Zealand) Scott Dixon W	Chip Ganassi Racing	Honda	90	+18.1857	3	6		22
10	4	(United States) Conor Daly	A. J. Foyt Enterprises	Chevrolet	90	+20.5661	3	11		20
11	5	(Canada) James Hinchcliffe	Schmidt Peterson Motorsports	Honda	90	+27.3241	3	8		19
12	27	(United States) Marco Andretti	Andretti Autosport	Honda	90	+29.9928	3	14		18
13	83	(United States) Charlie Kimball W	Chip Ganassi Racing	Honda	90	+31.1248	3	13		17
14	7	(Russia) Mikhail Aleshin	Schmidt Peterson Motorsports	Honda	90	+32.5958	3	21		16
15	8	(United Kingdom) Max Chilton	Chip Ganassi Racing	Honda	90	+33.1095	3	18		15
16	10	(Brazil) Tony Kanaan	Chip Ganassi Racing	Honda	90	+36.1997	4	17		14
17	21	(United States) J. R. Hildebrand	Ed Carpenter Racing	Chevrolet	90	+1:00.8248	5	19		13
18	14	(Colombia) Carlos Muñoz	A. J. Foyt Enterprises	Chevrolet	89	+1 Lap	4	20		12
19	20	(United States) Spencer Pigot	Ed Carpenter Racing	Chevrolet	89	+1 Lap	5	16		11
20	18	(Mexico) Esteban Gutiérrez R	Dale Coyne Racing	Honda	89	+1 Lap	4	12		10
21	19	(United Arab Emirates) Ed Jones R	Dale Coyne Racing	Honda	88	+2 Laps	4	15		9
OFFICIAL BOX SCORE

Notes

^{1} Points include 1 point for leading at least 1 lap during a race, an additional 2 points for leading the most race laps, and 1 point for Pole Position.

Source for time gaps:

== Championship standings ==
Driver standings

	Pos	Driver	Points
3	1	(United States) Josef Newgarden	453
	2	(Brazil) Hélio Castroneves	446
2	3	(New Zealand) Scott Dixon	445
1	4	(France) Simon Pagenaud	436
	5	(Australia) Will Power	401

Manufacturer standings

Pos	Manufacturer	Points
1	(United States) Chevrolet	1,115
2	(Japan) Honda	1,080

- Note: Only the top five positions are included.

Previous race: 2017 Honda Indy Toronto	IndyCar Series; 2017 season	Next race: 2017 ABC Supply 500
Previous race: 2016 Honda Indy 200	Honda Indy 200	Next race: 2018 Honda Indy 200
