= 2017 GoPro Grand Prix of Sonoma =

(United States) 2017 Sonoma
Race details
17th round of the 2017 IndyCar Series season
← Previous race
- Date: September 17, 2017
- Official name: GoPro Grand Prix of Sonoma
- Location: Sonoma Raceway
- Course: Permanent racing facility 2.2 mi / 3.5 km
- Distance: 85 laps 195.755 mi / 315.037 km

Pole position
- Driver: (United States) Josef Newgarden (Team Penske)
- Time: 1:15.5205

Fastest lap
- Driver: (France) Simon Pagenaud (Team Penske)
- Time: 1:18.3576 (on lap 13 of 85)

Podium
- First: (France) Simon Pagenaud (Team Penske)
- Second: (United States) Josef Newgarden (Team Penske)
- Third: (Australia) Will Power (Team Penske)

The 2017 GoPro Grand Prix of Sonoma was the 17th and final round of the 2017 IndyCar Series season. The race was contested on September 17, 2017, on the IndyCar layout of Sonoma Raceway in Sonoma, California, and served as the season finale for the series. Josef Newgarden of Team Penske won the pole for the race; he would finish second, which allowed him to win the championship. Newgarden's teammate, Simon Pagenaud, won the race for his second consecutive Sonoma victory.

== Results ==
Key	Meaning
R	Rookie
W	Past winner

=== Qualifying ===
Pos	No.	Name	Grp.	Round 1	Round 2	Firestone Fast 6
1	2	(United States) Josef Newgarden	1	1:15.7917	1:15.7325	1:15.5205
2	12	(Australia) Will Power W	2	1:16.1236	1:15.9919	1:15.5556
3	1	(France) Simon Pagenaud W	2	1:16.2220	1:15.7120	1:15.6356
4	3	(Brazil) Hélio Castroneves W	2	1:16.5534	1:15.9602	1:15.8032
5	26	(Japan) Takuma Sato	1	1:16.5644	1:16.0497	1:16.2208
6	9	(New Zealand) Scott Dixon W	1	1:16.9169	1:16.0957	1:16.3978
7	28	(United States) Ryan Hunter-Reay	1	1:16.5554	1:16.1815	
8	98	(United States) Alexander Rossi	1	1:16.2045	1:16.1934	
9	15	(United States) Graham Rahal	2	1:16.4658	1:16.1968	
10	18	(France) Sébastien Bourdais	2	1:16.5847	1:16.5811	
11	27	(United States) Marco Andretti W	2	1:16.3298	1:16.8221	
12	10	(Brazil) Tony Kanaan W	1	1:17.0359	1:16.9718	
13	4	(United States) Conor Daly	1	1:17.1016		
14	8	(United Kingdom) Max Chilton	2	1:16.7581		
15	83	(United States) Charlie Kimball	1	1:17.1417		
16	5	(Canada) James Hinchcliffe	2	1:16.9539		
17	20	(United States) Spencer Pigot	1	1:17.2662		
18	19	(United Arab Emirates) Ed Jones R	2	1:17.0231		
19	7	(United Kingdom) Jack Harvey R	1	1:17.2722		
20	21	(United States) J. R. Hildebrand	2	1:17.1602		
21	13	(Canada) Zachary Claman DeMelo R	1	1:17.2814		
22	14	(Colombia) Carlos Muñoz	2	1:17.2507		
OFFICIAL BOX SCORE

=== Race results ===
Pos	No.	Driver	Team	Engine	Laps	Time/Retired	Pit Stops	Grid	Laps Led	Pts.^{1}
1	1	(France) Simon Pagenaud W	Team Penske	Chevrolet	85	1:55:52.6840	4	3	41	103
2	2	(United States) Josef Newgarden	Team Penske	Chevrolet	85	+1.0986	3	1	41	82
3	12	(Australia) Will Power W	Team Penske	Chevrolet	85	+1.6139	3	2	-	70
4	9	(New Zealand) Scott Dixon W	Chip Ganassi Racing	Honda	85	+12.0870	3	6	-	64
5	3	(Brazil) Hélio Castroneves W	Team Penske	Chevrolet	85	+22.5022	3	4	-	60
6	15	(United States) Graham Rahal	Rahal Letterman Lanigan Racing	Honda	85	+23.5289	3	9	-	56
7	27	(United States) Marco Andretti W	Andretti Autosport	Honda	85	+23.9788	3	11	-	52
8	28	(United States) Ryan Hunter-Reay	Andretti Autosport	Honda	85	+24.5140	3	7	-	48
9	18	(France) Sébastien Bourdais	Dale Coyne Racing	Honda	85	+49.9911	3	10	-	44
10	4	(United States) Conor Daly	A. J. Foyt Enterprises	Chevrolet	85	+55.6650	3	13	3	41
11	83	(United States) Charlie Kimball	Chip Ganassi Racing	Honda	85	+1:21.0203	4	15	-	38
12	8	(United Kingdom) Max Chilton	Chip Ganassi Racing	Honda	85	+1:24.5038	3	14	-	36
13	20	(United States) Spencer Pigot	Ed Carpenter Racing	Chevrolet	84	+1 Lap	4	17	-	34
14	21	(United States) J. R. Hildebrand	Ed Carpenter Racing	Chevrolet	84	+1 Lap	4	20	-	32
15	14	(Colombia) Carlos Muñoz	A. J. Foyt Enterprises	Chevrolet	84	+1 Lap	3	22	-	30
16	10	(Brazil) Tony Kanaan W	Chip Ganassi Racing	Honda	84	+1 Lap	5	12	-	28
17	13	(Canada) Zachary Claman DeMelo R	Rahal Letterman Lanigan Racing	Honda	84	+1 Lap	4	21	-	26
18	7	(United Kingdom) Jack Harvey R	Schmidt Peterson Motorsports	Honda	84	+1 Lap	4	19	-	24
19	19	(United Arab Emirates) Ed Jones R	Dale Coyne Racing	Honda	69	Off Course	4	18	-	22
20	26	(Japan) Takuma Sato	Andretti Autosport	Honda	62	Off Course	3	5	-	20
21	98	(United States) Alexander Rossi	Andretti Herta Autosport	Honda	60	+25 Laps	4	8	-	18
22	5	(Canada) James Hinchcliffe	Schmidt Peterson Motorsports	Honda	52	Electical	3	16	-	16
OFFICIAL BOX SCORE

Notes

^{1} Points include 1 point for leading at least 1 lap during a race, an additional 2 points for leading the most race laps, and 1 point for Pole Position.

== Championship standings ==
Driver standings

	Pos	Driver	Points
	1	(United States) Josef Newgarden	642
2	2	(France) Simon Pagenaud	629
1	3	(New Zealand) Scott Dixon	621
1	4	(Brazil) Hélio Castroneves	598
	5	(Australia) Will Power	562

Manufacturer standings

Pos	Manufacturer	Points
1	(United States) Chevrolet	1,489
2	(Japan) Honda	1,326

- Note: Only the top-five drivers in the standings are included.

Previous race: 2017 IndyCar Grand Prix at The Glen	IndyCar Series; 2017 season	Next race: None
Previous race: 2016 GoPro Grand Prix of Sonoma	GoPro Grand Prix of Sonoma	Next race: 2018 GoPro Grand Prix of Sonoma
