= 2017 Honda Indy Toronto =

(Canada) 2017 Toronto
Race details
12th round of the 2017 IndyCar Series season
← Previous race	Next race →
- Date: July 16, 2017
- Official name: Honda Indy Toronto
- Location: Exhibition Place
- Course: Temporary road course 1.786 mi / 2.874 km
- Distance: 85 laps 151.81 mi / 244.314 km
- Weather: Temperatures reaching up to 27.3 °C (81.1 °F); with temperatures dropping to 22.1 °C (71.8 °F) by the end of the event

Pole position
- Driver: (France) Simon Pagenaud (Team Penske)
- Time: 58.9124

Fastest lap
- Driver: (France) Simon Pagenaud (Team Penske)
- Time: 1:00.2357 (on lap 55 of 85)

Podium
- First: (United States) Josef Newgarden (Team Penske)
- Second: (United States) Alexander Rossi (Andretti Herta Autosport)
- Third: (Canada) James Hinchcliffe (Schmidt Peterson Motorsports)

The 2017 Honda Indy Toronto was an IndyCar Series event held on July 16, 2017 in Toronto, Ontario, Canada. The race served as the 12th round of the 2017 IndyCar Series season. Frenchman Simon Pagenaud qualified on pole position, while American Josef Newgarden took victory in the race.

== Pre-Race ==
Prior to the race, Schmidt Peterson Motorsports elected to replace Mikhail Aleshin in the No. 7 car, instead opting for veteran driver Sebastián Saavedra. The reasons for the change were undisclosed by the team.

== Qualifying ==
Qualifying was held on Saturday, July 15. Simon Pagenaud secured pole position, setting a new track record time of 58.9124 at an average speed of 109.14 mph (175.64 km/h). Alongside him on the front row was Graham Rahal. The remained of the top six was rounded out by Hélio Castroneves, Will Power, Scott Dixon, and James Hinchcliffe.

Qualifying saw two incidents during the course of its several sessions. During the second group of round 1 qualifying, Esteban Gutiérrez suffered a heavy crash in turn 11 that placed doubt on his participation in the race, both due to damage to the car and due to Gutiérrez displaying concussion-like symptoms. However, the car was repaired, and Guitérrez was cleared by IndyCar's doctors, allowing him to participate in the race. A second, more minor incident occurred in round 2 qualifying, when J. R. Hildebrand made contact with the wall in turn 8.

== Race ==
The race was held on Sunday, July 16. At the start, Hélio Castroneves managed to pass both Simon Pagenaud and Graham Rahal going into turn 1, giving him the lead of the race. Behind them, Scott Dixon managed to get to the inside of Will Power to move to third. However, as cars approached turn 3, Dixon moved wide to avoid hitting the back of Rahal, in the process making contact with Power and forcing him into the outside wall. Power's car suffered terminal suspension damage, relegating him to a last place finish. Dixon limped around the track with a flat tire, which, after repairs, dropped him to the tail-end of the field. He would then be assessed a drive-through penalty for entering a closed pit-lane. The incident brought out the race's first caution period.

Racing resumed on lap 6, with Castroneves leading Pagenaud, Rahal, Josef Newgarden, and James Hinchcliffe. The top five remained unchanged until lap 20, when Spencer Pigot, who had charged through the field, managed to move around Hinchcliffe. Shortly thereafter, drivers began making their first pit stops, including Hinchcliffe, Alexander Rossi, and Josef Newgarden. Just as Newgarden entered the pits, Tony Kanaan nosed into the wall in turn 1, bringing out the race's second caution, forcing the leaders and anyone else who had not pitted to make their first stop under caution and secede track position. Newgarden proved the biggest beneficiary of the caution, moving into the lead once the leaders came into pit lane. Behind him were Ed Jones, who had not yet pitted, Charlie Kimball, Rossi, and Hinchcliffe.

Racing resumed on lap 27 with the top five remaining intact. Further back, Takuma Sato suffered front wing damage and a punctured tire, forcing him to pit again. On lap 29, Jones began to fall back in the field due to his worn tires, losing position first to Kimball, then to Rossi, Hinchcliffe, and Marco Andretti before finally coming in to pit on lap 33. Several drivers began to make their second pit stops shortly thereafter, including Carlos Muñoz, Scott Dixon, and second-place running Kimball. This promoted Rossi to second, but Newgarden continued to extend his lead.

The running order remained the same until the leaders made their pit-stops at lap 54, when Newgarden led the entire top five into the pits. Max Chilton briefly inherited the lead before handing the lead over to Pagenaud with his stop on lap later. Pagenaud led until lap 57 when he pitted, allowing Newgarden to return to the lead of the race. The order now ran Newgarden, Rossi, Hinchcliffe, Dixon, Andretti, though Dixon would pit for the final time on lap 61, promoting Ryan Hunter-Reay into the top 5, though with heavy pressure from Pagenaud behind. The top five remained the same until lap 81, when Hunter-Reay ran wide at turn 7, allowing Pagenaud to move ahead for position. Up front, despite dealing with traffic from a dueling Takuma Sato and Conor Daly, Josef Newgarden held on to take his second victory of the 2017 season by a comfortable margin of 1.87 seconds over Alexander Rossi, while James Hinchcliffe came across the line third. Marco Andretti secured his first top 5 finish in IndyCar since the 2015 MAVTV 500 with his fourth-place finish.

In the point standings, Scott Dixon remained in the lead of the championship, but his lead dropped to only three points over Hélio Castroneves. Simon Pagenaud remained in third place, while Newgarden moved past his teammate Will Power thanks to his victory.

== Results ==
Key	Meaning
R	Rookie
W	Past winner

=== Qualifying ===
Pos	No.	Name	Grp.	Round 1	Round 2	Firestone Fast 6
1	1	(France) Simon Pagenaud	2	59.5570	59.2922	58.9124
2	15	(United States) Graham Rahal	1	59.3984	59.7432	59.2245
3	3	(Brazil) Hélio Castroneves	1	59.6836	59.6497	59.4345
4	12	(Australia) Will Power W	1	59.3910	59.6476	59.5430
5	9	(New Zealand) Scott Dixon W	2	59.7578	59.5732	59.7970
6	5	(Canada) James Hinchcliffe	2	1:00.0348	59.7201	1:00.1415
7	2	(United States) Josef Newgarden W	2	59.6609	59.8992	
8	98	(United States) Alexander Rossi	2	59.5577	1:00.0114	
9	8	(United Kingdom) Max Chilton	2	59.7555	1:00.1202	
10	26	(Japan) Takuma Sato	1	59.5527	1:00.1970	
11	27	(United States) Marco Andretti	1	59.7464	1:00.3384	
12	21	(United States) J. R. Hildebrand	1	59.6967	1:02.3040	
13	20	(United States) Spencer Pigot	1	59.7585		
14	10	(Brazil) Tony Kanaan	2	1:00.0607		
15	19	(United Arab Emirates) Ed Jones R	1	59.8686		
16	28	(United States) Ryan Hunter-Reay W	2	1:00.0926		
17	83	(United States) Charlie Kimball	1	59.9820		
18	4	(United States) Conor Daly	2	1:00.2713		
19	14	(Colombia) Carlos Muñoz	1	1:00.1650		
20	7	(Colombia) Sebastián Saavedra	2	1:00.6272		
21	18	(Mexico) Esteban Gutiérrez R	2	1:00.7441		
OFFICIAL BOX SCORE

Source for individual rounds:

=== Race results ===
Pos	No.	Driver	Team	Engine	Laps	Time/retired	Pit stops	Grid	Laps led	Pts.^{1}
1	2	(United States) Josef Newgarden W	Team Penske	Chevrolet	85	1:35:05.3522	2	7	58	53
2	98	(United States) Alexander Rossi	Andretti Herta Autosport	Honda	85	+1.8704	2	8		40
3	5	(Canada) James Hinchcliffe	Schmidt Peterson Motorsports	Honda	85	+4.7020	2	6		35
4	27	(United States) Marco Andretti	Andretti Autosport	Honda	85	+18.7408	2	11		32
5	1	(France) Simon Pagenaud	Team Penske	Chevrolet	85	+19.4274	2	1	2	32
6	28	(United States) Ryan Hunter-Reay W	Andretti Autosport	Honda	85	+27.3905	2	16		28
7	8	(United Kingdom) Max Chilton	Chip Ganassi Racing	Honda	85	+28.3386	2	9	1	27
8	3	(Brazil) Hélio Castroneves	Team Penske	Chevrolet	85	+28.9415	2	3	24	25
9	15	(United States) Graham Rahal	Rahal Letterman Lanigan Racing	Honda	85	+29.7693	2	2		22
10	9	(New Zealand) Scott Dixon W	Chip Ganassi Racing	Honda	85	+30.3369	4	5		20
11	7	(Colombia) Sebastián Saavedra	Schmidt Peterson Motorsports	Honda	85	+32.7668	2	20		19
12	83	(United States) Charlie Kimball	Chip Ganassi Racing	Honda	85	+36.4821	3	17		18
13	21	(United States) J. R. Hildebrand	Ed Carpenter Racing	Chevrolet	85	+52.8910	2	12		17
14	18	(Mexico) Esteban Gutiérrez R	Dale Coyne Racing	Honda	85	+53.9858	2	21		16
15	14	(Colombia) Carlos Muñoz	A. J. Foyt Enterprises	Chevrolet	85	+57.2777	3	19		15
16	26	(Japan) Takuma Sato	Andretti Autosport	Honda	85	+1:01.8457	3	10		14
17	4	(United States) Conor Daly	A. J. Foyt Enterprises	Chevrolet	85	+1:02.3752	4	18		13
18	20	(United States) Spencer Pigot	Ed Carpenter Racing	Chevrolet	84	+1 Lap	4	13		12
19	10	(Brazil) Tony Kanaan	Chip Ganassi Racing	Honda	83	+2 Laps	3	14		11
20	19	(United Arab Emirates) Ed Jones R	Dale Coyne Racing	Honda	75	Mechanical	2	15		10
21	12	(Australia) Will Power W	Team Penske	Chevrolet	0	Contact	0	4		9
OFFICIAL BOX SCORE

Notes

^{1} Points include 1 point for leading at least 1 lap during a race, an additional 2 points for leading the most race laps, and 1 point for Pole Position.

Source for time gaps:

== Championship standings ==
Driver standings

	Pos	Driver	Points
	1	(New Zealand) Scott Dixon	423
	2	(Brazil) Hélio Castroneves	420
	3	(France) Simon Pagenaud	404
1	4	(United States) Josef Newgarden	400
1	5	(Australia) Will Power	359

Manufacturer standings

Pos	Manufacturer	Points
1	(Japan) Honda	1,045
2	(United States) Chevrolet	1,022

- Note: Only the top five positions are included.

Previous race: 2017 Iowa Corn 300	IndyCar Series; 2017 season	Next race: 2017 Honda Indy 200
Previous race: 2016 Honda Indy Toronto	Honda Indy Toronto	Next race: 2018 Honda Indy Toronto
