= Ed Jones (racing driver) =

British racing driver (born 1995)

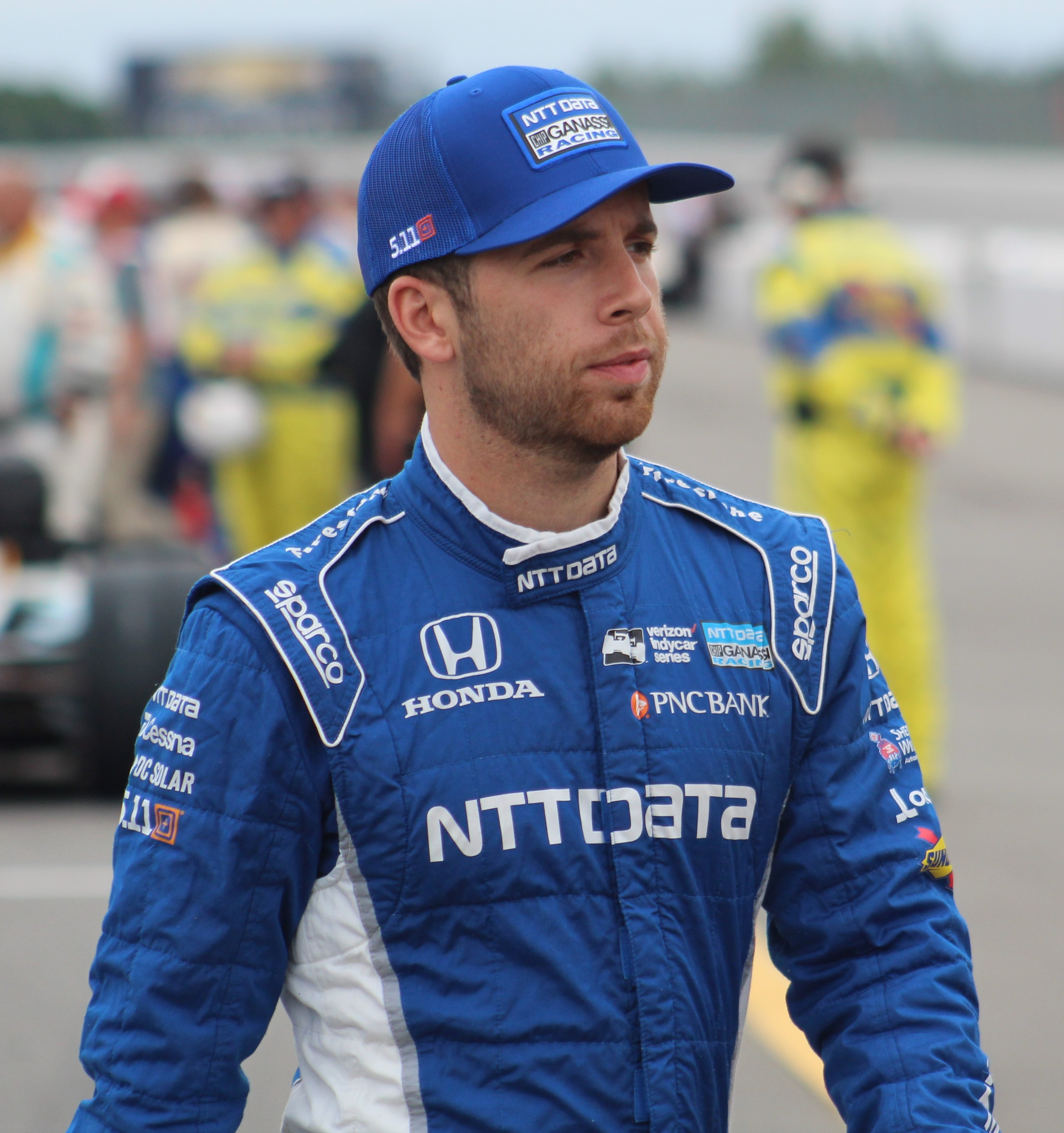
- Jones at the 2018 ABC Supply 500
- Nationality: (United Kingdom) British (United Arab Emirates) Emirati (Note: Jones is a British citizen who was born and raised in the United Arab Emirates. He has competed under the flags of both countries throughout his career.)
- Born: Edward Jones; 12 February 1995 (age 31) Dubai, United Arab Emirates
- Categorisation: FIA Gold

Previous series
- 2016 2014 2013 2012–13 2012 2011–13 2011 2011: Indy Lights; FIA European F3 Championship; British F3; European F3 Open Championship; Formula Renault 2.0 NEC; Eurocup Formula Renault 2.0; Formula Renault UK; InterSteps Championship

Championship titles
- 2013 2016: European F3 Open Championship; Indy Lights

Awards
- 2017: IndyCar Rookie of the Year

IndyCar Series career
- 63 races run over 4 years
- Team: No. 18 (Dale Coyne Racing with Vasser-Sullivan)
- 2019 position: 20th
- Best finish: 13th (2018)
- First race: 2017 Firestone Grand Prix of St. Petersburg (St. Petersburg)
- Last race: 2021 Acura Grand Prix of Long Beach (Long Beach)
Wins	Podiums	Poles
0	3	0

NASCAR O'Reilly Auto Parts Series career
- 5 races run over 1 year
- Car no., team: 24/26 (Sam Hunt Racing)
- 2024 position: 43rd
- Best finish: 43rd (2024)
- First race: 2024 Focused Health 250 (Circuit of the Americas)
- Last race: 2024 Drive for the Cure 250 (Charlotte Roval)
Wins	Top tens	Poles
0	1	0

NASCAR FedEx Freight Truck Series career
- 1 race run over 1 year
- 2023 position: 81st
- Best finish: 81st (2023)
- First race: 2023 XPEL 225 (Austin)
Wins	Top tens	Poles
0	0	0

Edward Jones (born 12 February 1995) is an Emirati-born British racing driver who last competed part-time in the IMSA SportsCar Championship, driving the No. 20 Oreca 07 for High Class Racing, and part-time in the NASCAR Xfinity Series, driving the Nos. 24/26 Toyota Supra for Sam Hunt Racing. Primarily an open-wheel racing driver, Jones previously competed in the Formula Renault Eurocup, Formula Three, Indy Lights, IndyCar Series and FIA World Endurance Championship.

Jones won the 2016 Indy Lights championship driving for Carlin Motorsport in just his second season in the series. He joined the IndyCar Series full-time in 2017 driving for Dale Coyne Racing and finished third in the 2017 Indianapolis 500. In 2018, he drove full-time for Chip Ganassi Racing and in 2019, he drove the majority of the IndyCar season in an entry fielded by Ed Carpenter Racing in a collaboration with sports car racing team Scuderia Corsa. In 2020, Jones was scheduled to leave IndyCar and compete in the Deutsche Tourenwagen Masters but did not end up running any races due to COVID-19 pandemic travel restrictions. In 2021, he returned to IndyCar and DCR, driving the team's joint entry with Vasser-Sullivan Racing. In 2022, he competed full-time in the FIA World Endurance Championship for Jota Sport.

At different points in his career, Jones has competed under both British and Emirati licences.

== Racing career ==
=== Karting ===
Born in Dubai, Jones began his racing career in karting in local championships at the age of nine. In 2005, he clinched the United Arab Emirates karting championship title. He collected six titles in various classes before he started a karting campaign in Europe in 2008. He raced in the Rotax Max and KF3 categories until 2010.

=== InterSteps and Formula Renault ===
In 2011, Jones made his debut in single-seaters taking part in the new-for-2011 InterSteps championship for Fortec Motorsport, finishing the championship in fourth place with one win. As well as this, Jones raced for Fortec in the Eurocup Formula Renault 2.0 and the British Formula Renault Championship, as well as the off-season Formula Renault UK Finals Series, finishing fifteenth in the standings with four-point-scoring finishes.

Jones continued his collaboration with Fortec into 2012, competing in Formula Renault 2.0 NEC and the Eurocup Formula Renault 2.0. His only points finish in the Eurocup was a ninth place at Le Castellet, that brought him 27th place in the series standings.

Jones remained at Fortec in 2013, competing again in some of the Formula Renault Eurocup rounds taking two podium positions at the Red Bull Ring in Spielburg, Austria. He finished eleventh in the championship with 45 points.

=== Formula Three ===
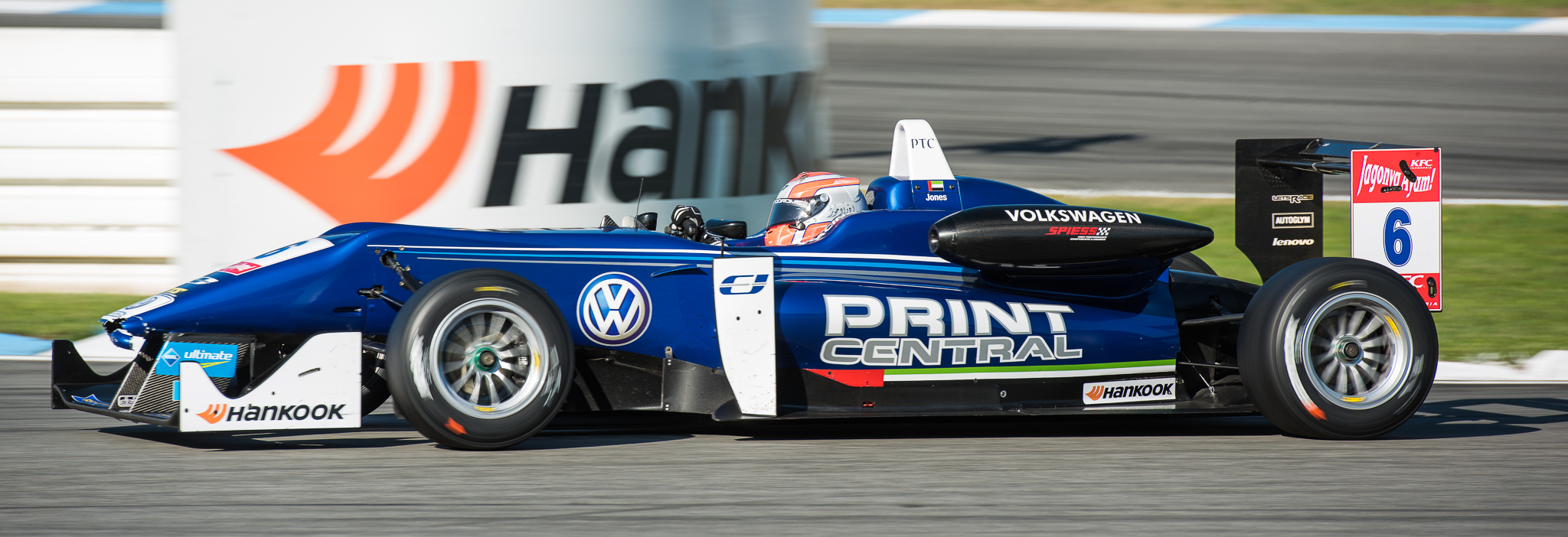
Ed Jones in F3 - Hockenheimring 2014

After contesting the final round of the 2012 European F3 Open Championship for Team West-Tec, Jones moved into the series full-time the following year, competing for the same team. Despite missing the opening round, he exceeded Sandy Stuvik in the championship battle with six wins and another four podiums.

Jones, who already competed for Fortec in the Hockenheimring round of the FIA European Formula Three Championship in 2013, raced for Carlin Motorsport in 2014.

=== Indy Lights ===
In 2015, Jones moved to the Indy Lights series, the recognised feeder championship for the IndyCar Series. He was signed to drive for Carlin, as he did in Formula 3, and took pole position and the race victory in both his and Carlin's first event in the series in St. Petersburg, Florida. He also won the second and third races of the season, and finished third in the championship standings.

In October 2015, it was announced that Jones would return with Carlin to the Indy Lights series for 2016. With two wins at Barber and Indianapolis, Jones would claim the Lights championship over Santiago Urrutia in a controversial ending. During the last lap of the last race of the 2016 series in Laguna Seca, Jones was holding the fifth position but was helped by his teammate Félix Serrallés who was holding fourth position in the race. Serrallés moved aside and gave his position to Jones, making him the champion by a slim points difference. Consequently he won the Earl Howe trophy for the best performance by a British driver in North America in 2016.

=== IndyCar ===
==== Dale Coyne Racing (2017) ====
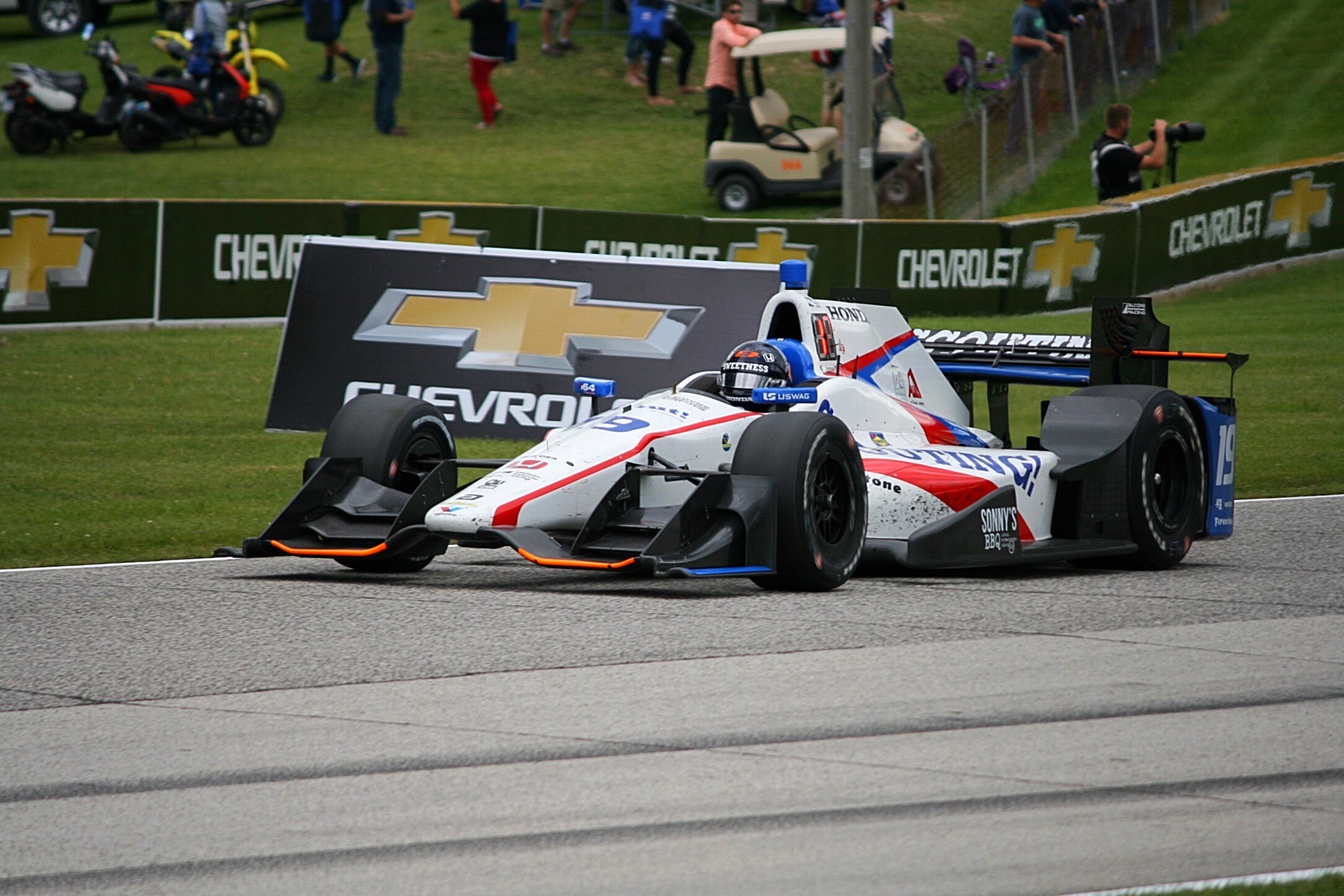
Jones racing at Road America in 2017 for Dale Coyne Racing

Having won the 2016 Indy Lights title, Jones stepped up to IndyCar for 2017. On 14 November 2016, he was announced as the driver of the No. 19 for Dale Coyne Racing alongside Sébastien Bourdais. He achieved his first podium finish in the series at the 2017 Indy 500. Jones was the 2017 Rookie of the Year.

==== Chip Ganassi Racing (2018) ====
On 25 October 2017, Jones was announced as the driver of the No. 10 for Chip Ganassi Racing alongside Scott Dixon for 2018. In September 2018, it was announced that he would be replaced for 2019 by Felix Rosenqvist.

==== Ed Carpenter Racing Scuderia Corsa (2019) ====
On 17 October 2018, it was confirmed that Jones would run all non-oval events as well as the 2019 Indianapolis 500 for a joint venture between Ed Carpenter Racing and Scuderia Corsa, driving the No. 20 in the road/street events and the No. 63 in the Indy 500. In his first race with the team, Jones broke a bone in his hand after a shunt that knocked him out of the race.

Jones with Scuderia Corsa placed in the Fast 9 in Indianapolis 500 qualifying and eventually placed fifth overall in the field. He also topped a practice session.

=== DTM ===
In December 2019, it was announced that Jones would be driving for Audi in the 2020 DTM series.

However, Jones was replaced by Harrison Newey in the beginning of the season as he was stuck in Dubai due to travel restrictions because of COVID-19.

=== Return to IndyCar ===
==== Return to Dale Coyne Racing (2021) ====
In January 2021, Dale Coyne Racing announced they had re-signed Jones to compete in the 2021 IndyCar season. Despite qualifying in eleventh place for the 2021 Indianapolis 500, Jones would end the race in 28th place and was a lap down behind the leading cars.

The team announced in December that Jones was to be replaced by David Malukas for 2022.

=== NASCAR ===
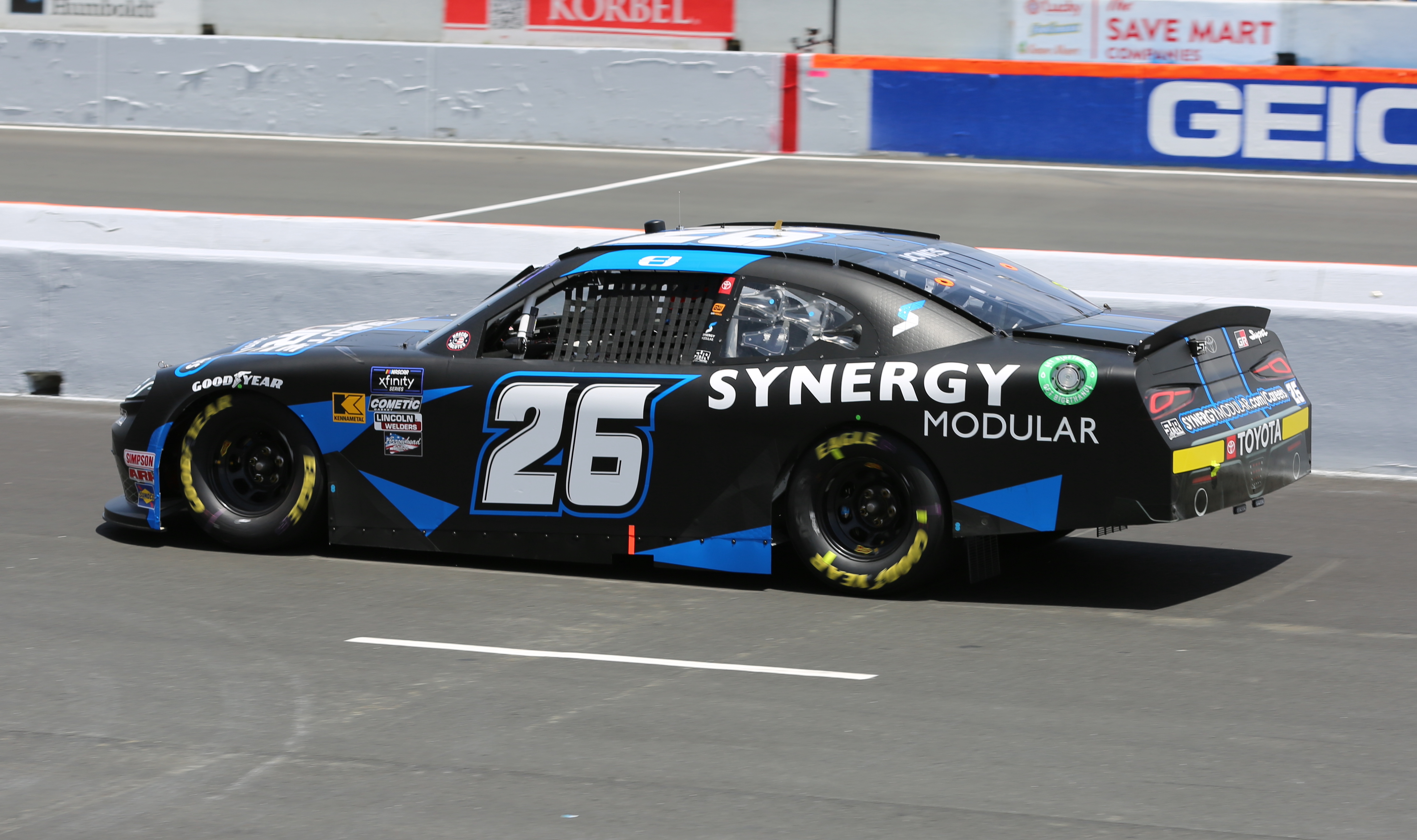
Jones' No. 26 car at Sonoma Raceway in 2024

On March 11, 2023, it was announced that Jones would make his debut in NASCAR, driving in the Truck Series race at Circuit of the Americas in the No. 20 truck for Young's Motorsports.

== Racing record ==
=== Career summary ===
Season	Series	Team	Races	Wins	Poles	FLaps	Podiums	Points	Position
2011	InterSteps Championship	Fortec Motorsports	20	1	5	3	9	427	4th
2011	Eurocup Formula Renault 2.0	Fortec Motorsports	6	0	0	0	0	0	NC†
2011	Formula Renault UK	Fortec Motorsports	6	0	0	0	0	0	NC†
2011	Formula Renault UK Finals Series	Fortec Motorsports	6	0	0	0	0	42	15th
2012	Eurocup Formula Renault 2.0	Fortec Motorsports	14	0	0	0	0	2	27th
2012	Formula Renault 2.0 NEC	Fortec Motorsports	11	0	0	0	1	85	20th
2012	European F3 Open	Team West-Tec F3	2	0	0	0	1	0	NC†
2013	European F3 Open	Team West-Tec F3	14	6	4	3	10	130	**1st**
2013	British Formula 3 Championship - National Class	Team West-Tec F3	6	5	4	4	5	103	**3rd**
2013	Eurocup Formula Renault 2.0	Fortec Motorsports	12	0	0	0	2	45	11th
2013	Formula Renault 2.0 NEC	Fortec Motorsports	5	0	0	0	0	43	29th
2013	FIA European Formula 3 Championship	Fortec Motorsports	3	0	0	0	0	0	NC†
2013	Macau Grand Prix	Fortec Motorsports	1	0	0	0	0	N/A	19th
2014	FIA European Formula 3 Championship	Carlin	20	0	0	0	2	70	13th
2015	Indy Lights	Carlin	16	3	3	3	7	324	3rd
2016	Indy Lights	Carlin	18	2	8	0	8	363	**1st**
2016	24H Series - 991	Lechner Racing Middle East							
2017	IndyCar Series	Dale Coyne Racing	17	0	0	0	1	354	14th
2018	IndyCar Series	Chip Ganassi Racing	17	0	0	0	2	343	13th
2019	IndyCar Series	Ed Carpenter Racing Scuderia Corsa	13	0	0	0	0	217	20th
2021	IndyCar Series	Dale Coyne Racing with Vasser-Sullivan	16	0	0	0	0	233	19th
2021	IMSA SportsCar Championship - GTD	Scuderia Corsa	1	0	0	0	0	194	68th
2022	FIA World Endurance Championship - LMP2	Jota	6	0	0	1	2	70	8th
2022	24 Hours of Le Mans - LMP2	Jota	1	0	0	0	0	N/A	**3rd**
2022	IMSA SportsCar Championship - LMP2	G-Drive Racing with APR	1	0	0	0	0	0	NC†
2023	IMSA SportsCar Championship - LMP2	High Class Racing	7	0	0	0	0	1605	6th
2023	NASCAR Craftsman Truck Series	Young's Motorsports	1	0	0	N/A	N/A	1	81st
2024	NASCAR Xfinity Series	Sam Hunt Racing	5	0	0	N/A	N/A	71	43rd

^{†} As Jones was a guest driver, he was ineligible for points.

=== Complete Eurocup Formula Renault 2.0 results ===
(key) (Races in bold indicate pole position) (Races in italics indicate fastest lap)

Year	Entrant	1	2	3	4	5	6	7	8	9	10	11	12	13	14	Pos	Points
2011	Fortec Motorsport	ALC; 1	ALC; 2	SPA; 1	SPA; 2	NÜR; 1	NÜR; 2	HUN; 1	HUN; 2	SIL; 1; 20	SIL; 2; 25	LEC; 1; 17	LEC; 2; 16	CAT; 1 Ret	CAT; 2 Ret	NC†	0
2012	Fortec Motorsports	ALC; 1; 18	ALC; 2; 25	SPA; 1; 16	SPA; 2; 31	NÜR; 1; 21	NÜR; 2; 16	MSC; 1; 18	MSC; 2 Ret	HUN; 1; 24	HUN; 2; 31	LEC; 1; 28	LEC; 2; 9	CAT; 1; 23	CAT; 2; 11	27th	2
2013	Fortec Motorsports	ALC; 1 Ret	ALC; 2; 14	SPA; 1	SPA; 2	MSC; 1; 20	MSC; 2; 10	RBR; 1; 3	RBR; 2; 3	HUN; 1; 27	HUN; 2; 7	LEC; 1 Ret	LEC; 2; 6	CAT; 1 Ret	CAT; 2; 17	11th	45

^{†} As Jones was a guest driver, he was ineligible for points.

=== Complete Formula Renault 2.0 NEC results ===
(key) (Races in bold indicate pole position) (Races in italics indicate fastest lap)

Year	Entrant	1	2	3	4	5	6	7	8	9	10	11	12	13	14	15	16	17	18	19	20	DC	Points
2012	Fortec Motorsports	HOC; 1; 33	HOC; 2; 25	HOC; 3; 13	NÜR; 1; 8	NÜR; 2 DNS	OSC; 1	OSC; 2	OSC; 3	ASS; 1; 5	ASS; 2; 8	RBR; 1	RBR; 2	MST; 1; 10	MST; 2; 18	MST; 3; 8	ZAN; 1	ZAN; 2	ZAN; 3	SPA; 1; 25	SPA; 2; 15	21st	85
2013	Fortec Motorsports	HOC; 1; 14	HOC; 2; 18	HOC; 3; 13	NÜR; 1; 11	NÜR; 2; 6	SIL; 1	SIL; 2	SPA; 1	SPA; 2	ASS; 1	ASS; 2	MST; 1	MST; 2	MST; 3	ZAN; 1	ZAN; 2	ZAN; 3				29th	43

=== Complete FIA Formula 3 European Championship results ===
(key)

Year	Entrant	Engine	1	2	3	4	5	6	7	8	9	10	11	12	13	14	15	16	17	18	19	20	21	22	23	24	25	26	27	28	29	30	31	32	33	DC	Points
2013	Fortec Motorsports	Mercedes	MNZ; 1	MNZ; 2	MNZ; 3	SIL; 1	SIL; 2	SIL; 3	HOC; 1; 20	HOC; 2; 23	HOC; 3; 20	BRH; 1	BRH; 2	BRH; 3	RBR; 1	RBR; 2	RBR; 3	NOR; 1	NOR; 2	NOR; 3	NÜR; 1	NÜR; 2	NÜR; 3	ZAN; 1	ZAN; 2	ZAN; 3	VAL; 1	VAL; 2	VAL; 3	HOC; 1	HOC; 2	HOC; 3				NC†	0†
2014	Carlin	Volkswagen	SIL; 1; 8	SIL; 2; 7	SIL; 3; 15	HOC; 1; 2	HOC; 2; 3	HOC; 3; 15	PAU; 1; 8	PAU; 2 Ret	PAU; 3; 17	HUN; 1	HUN; 2	HUN; 3	SPA; 1	SPA; 2	SPA; 3	NOR; 1	NOR; 2	NOR; 3	MSC; 1	MSC; 2	MSC; 3	RBR; 1 NC	RBR; 2; 6	RBR; 3; 6	NÜR; 1; 10	NÜR; 2; 8	NÜR; 3 DNS	IMO; 1; 13	IMO; 2; 13	IMO; 3 Ret	HOC; 1; 13	HOC; 2; 14	HOC; 3; 9	13th	70

^{†} As Jones was a guest driver, he was ineligible for points.

=== American open-wheel racing results ===
==== Indy Lights ====
Year	Team	1	2	3	4	5	6	7	8	9	10	11	12	13	14	15	16	17	18	Rank	Points	Ref
2015	Carlin	**STP**; 1	STP; 1	LBH; 1	ALA; 4	ALA; 11	IMS; 3	**IMS**; 4	INDY; 10	TOR; 5	TOR; 3	MIL; 8	IOW; 2	MOH; 9	MOH; 9	LAG; 3	LAG; 4			3rd	324	
2016	Carlin	STP; 10	STP; 7	PHX; 2	**ALA**; 1	**ALA**; 2	**IMS**; 1	**IMS**; 4	**INDY**; 2	RDA; 4	**RDA**; 13	**IOW**; 3	TOR; 6	TOR; 5	MOH; 6	MOH; 11	WGL; 2	LAG; 2	**LAG**; 4	1st	363	

==== IndyCar Series ====
(key)

Year	Team	No.	Chassis	Engine	1	2	3	4	5	6	7	8	9	10	11	12	13	14	15	16	17	Rank	Points	Ref
2017	Dale Coyne Racing	19	Dallara DW12	Honda	STP; 10	LBH; 6	ALA; 16	PHX; 11	IMS; 19	INDY; 3	DET; 9	DET; 22	TXS; 17	ROA; 7	IOW; 18	TOR; 20	MOH; 21	POC; 17	GTW; 13	WGL; 13	SNM; 19	14th	354	
2018	Chip Ganassi Racing	10	Dallara DW12	Honda	STP; 8	PHX; 20	LBH; 3	ALA; 20	IMS; 22	INDY; 31	DET; 6	DET; 3	TXS; 9	ROA; 9	IOW; 13	TOR; 12	MOH; 15	POC; 12	GTW; 8	POR; 24	SNM; 10	13th	343	
2019	Ed Carpenter Racing Scuderia Corsa	20	Dallara DW12	Chevrolet	STP; 21	COA; 14	ALA; 19	LBH; 16	IMS; 6		DET; 20	DET; 14	TXS	RDA; 22	TOR; 12	IOW	MOH; 13	POC	GTW	POR; 14	LAG; 23	20th	217	
2019	Ed Carpenter Racing Scuderia Corsa	63	Dallara DW12	Chevrolet						INDY; 13												20th	217	
2021	Dale Coyne Racing with Vasser-Sullivan	18	Dallara DW12	Honda	ALA; 15	STP; 20	TXS; 12	TXS; 22	IMS; 14	INDY; 28	DET; 9	DET; 17	ROA; 23	MOH; 26	NSH; 6	IMS; 14	GTW; 24	POR; 11	LAG; 10	LBH; 12		19th	233	

==== Indianapolis 500 ====
Year	Chassis	Engine	Start	Finish	Team
2017	Dallara	Honda	11	3	Dale Coyne Racing
2018	Dallara	Honda	29	31	Chip Ganassi Racing
2019	Dallara	Chevrolet	4	13	Scuderia Corsa with Ed Carpenter Racing
2021	Dallara	Honda	11	28	Dale Coyne Racing with Vasser-Sullivan

=== Complete IMSA SportsCar Championship results ===
(key) (Races in bold indicate pole position; races in italics indicate fastest lap)

Year	Entrant	Class	Make	Engine	1	2	3	4	5	6	7	8	9	10	11	12	Rank	Points	Ref
2021	Scuderia Corsa	GTD	Ferrari 488 GT3 Evo 2020	Ferrari F154CB 3.9 L Turbo V8	DAY; 14	SEB	MOH	DET	WGL	WGL	LIM	ELK	LGA	LBH	VIR	PET	68th	194	
2022	G-Drive Racing By APR	LMP2	Aurus 01	Gibson GK428 V8	DAY; 5†	SEB	LGA	MOH	WGL	ELK	PET						NC†	0†	
2023	High Class Racing	LMP2	Oreca 07	Gibson GK428 4.2 L V8	DAY; 8†	SEB; 6	LGA; 6	WGL; 8	ELK; 5	IMS; 7	PET; 6						6th	1605	

^{†} Points only counted towards the Michelin Endurance Cup, and not the overall LMP2 Championship.

=== Complete FIA World Endurance Championship results ===
(key) (Races in bold indicate pole position; races in italics indicate fastest lap)

Year	Entrant	Class	Car	Engine	1	2	3	4	5	6	Rank	Points
2022	Jota Sport	LMP2	Oreca 07	Gibson GK428 4.2 L V8	SEB; 5	SPA; Ret	LMS; 3	MNZ; 10	FUJ; 3	BHR; 7	8th	70

=== Complete 24 Hours of Le Mans results ===
Year	Team	Co-Drivers	Car	Class	Laps	Pos.	Class Pos.
2022	(United Kingdom) Jota Sport	(South Africa) Jonathan Aberdein (Denmark) Oliver Rasmussen	Oreca 07-Gibson	LMP2	368	7th	**3rd**

=== NASCAR ===
(key) (Bold – Pole position awarded by qualifying time. Italics – Pole position earned by points standings or practice time. * – Most laps led.)

==== Xfinity Series ====
NASCAR Xfinity Series results
Year	Team	No.	Make	1	2	3	4	5	6	7	8	9	10	11	12	13	14	15	16	17	18	19	20	21	22	23	24	25	26	27	28	29	30	31	32	33	NXSC	Pts	Ref
2024	Sam Hunt Racing	24	Toyota	DAY	ATL	LVS	PHO	COA; 35	RCH	MAR	TEX	TAL	DOV	DAR	CLT	PIR; 5																					43rd	71	
2024	Sam Hunt Racing	26	Toyota														SON; 15	IOW	NHA	NSH	CSC	POC	IND	MCH	DAY	DAR	ATL	GLN; 24	BRI	KAN	TAL	ROV; 37	LVS	HOM	MAR	PHO	43rd	71	

==== Craftsman Truck Series ====
NASCAR Craftsman Truck Series results
Year	Team	No.	Make	1	2	3	4	5	6	7	8	9	10	11	12	13	14	15	16	17	18	19	20	21	22	23	NCTC	Pts	Ref
2023	Young's Motorsports	20	Chevy	DAY	LVS	ATL	COA; 36	TEX	BRI	MAR	KAN	DAR	NWS	CLT	GTW	NSH	MOH	POC	RCH	IRP	MLW	KAN	BRI	TAL	HOM	PHO	81st	1	

== Notes ==
Sporting positions
Preceded by Niccolò Schirò	European F3 Open Championship; Champion; 2013	Succeeded by Sandy Stuvik
Preceded by Spencer Pigot	Indy Lights; Champion; 2016	Succeeded by Kyle Kaiser
