= 2017 Kohler Grand Prix =

(United States) 2017 Road America
Race details
10th round of the 2017 IndyCar Series season
← Previous race	Next race →
- Date: June 25, 2017
- Official name: Kohler Grand Prix
- Location: Road America
- Course: Permanent racing facility 4.048 mi / 6.458 km
- Distance: 55 laps 222.64 mi / 358.304 km

Pole position
- Driver: (Brazil) Hélio Castroneves (Team Penske)
- Time: 1:41.3007

Fastest lap
- Driver: (United States) Josef Newgarden (Team Penske)
- Time: 1:43.4651 (on lap 52 of 55)

Podium
- First: (New Zealand) Scott Dixon (Chip Ganassi Racing)
- Second: (United States) Josef Newgarden (Team Penske)
- Third: (Brazil) Hélio Castroneves (Team Penske)

The 2017 Kohler Grand Prix was an IndyCar Series event held at Road America in Elkhart Lake, Wisconsin. The race served as the 10th round of the 2017 IndyCar Series season. Hélio Castroneves qualified on pole position for the race, while Scott Dixon took victory.

== Background ==
For the 2017 event, the length of the race was extended by five laps.

Just prior to the race, Mikhail Aleshin ran into issues with his visa that temporarily prevented him from entering the United States following his participation in the 2017 24 Hours of Le Mans in France. DTM driver Robert Wickens was placed on stand-by to fill in for Aleshin if his issues were unable to be cleared in time for the race. Wickens completed practice in the No. 7 car, but Aleshin's visa issued were resolved shortly, allowing him to arrive at the track on Friday night and compete in all remaining sessions during the race weekend.

== Qualifying ==
Qualifying for the race took place on Saturday, June 24. Hélio Castroneves secured his 50th career pole position at an average speed of 143.85 mph (231.52 km/h) as Team Penske locked out the front two rows of the field, with Will Power starting second, Josef Newgarden third, and Simon Pagenaud fourth. Scott Dixon qualified fifth, making him fastest of cars outside of the Penske stable.

== Race ==
The race was held on Sunday, June 25. The start of the race saw Hélio Castroneves hold his lead, while Josef Newgarden managed to get around Will Power for second. Scott Dixon managed to get around Simon Pagenaud during the opening lap as well, while further back, Spencer Pigot suffered a broken front-wing after making contact with Ryan Hunter-Reay. This order remained intact for several laps, though Dixon pressured Power for the third position for several laps. On lap 6, some drivers, including Alexander Rossi, Graham Rahal, and Mikhail Aleshin began stops for what would be a four-stop strategy for them. The leaders, electing to use a three-stop strategy, did not pit until around lap 13. After the first stops, Castroneves held a narrow lead over Newgarden, while Dixon and Rossi both leapfrogged Power to take third and fourth place, respectively. Shortly thereafter, Pagenaud moved by Power, dropping Power out of the top five.

On lap 20, Newgarden was able to move around Castroneves and pull away, placing himself solidly in the lead. Castroneves soon began falling into the clutches of Dixon and Pagenaud when the second round of stops for the leaders came at lap 27. During the stops, Newgarden maintained his lead, but now was ahead of Dixon in second. Nearly immediately after the completion of the first round of stops came the race's first caution period as Takuma Sato spun and made contact with the wall in turn 11 on lap 29, though was able to continue after getting a bump start from the safety team. During the caution, the drivers on the four-stop strategy elected to pit.

The restart saw Dixon swing around the outside of Newgarden through turn 1 and successfully grab the lead, with Castroneves moving past Newgarden a few turns later. The top five remained the same until the final round of stops on around lap 41. Dixon maintained his lead of the race, while Newgarden successfully moved back around his teammate to put him back in second. Castroneves, Pagenaud, and Power rounded out the top five. On lap 45, the race saw its second caution period, as Tony Kanaan crashed heavily in turn 11 after breaking his front wing in an attempt to pass Alexander Rossi.

The restart came at lap 48 with the front runners remaining in the same order. Further back, Rossi, dealing with damage from the previous incident, was pushed off course and dropped down to 12th. Up front, no one was able to challenge Dixon for the remainder of the race, allowing him to secure his 41st career IndyCar victory, but his first of the 2017 season. Newgarden came across the line in second, while Castroneves came across the line third. Pagenaud and Power rounded out the top five. Dixon's victory allowed him to extend his lead in the championship, placing him 34 points ahead of Pagenaud.

== Report ==
Key	Meaning
R	Rookie
W	Past winner

=== Qualifying ===
Pos	No.	Name	Grp.	Round 1	Round 2	Firestone Fast 6
1	3	(Brazil) Hélio Castroneves	2	1:42.0758	1:41.8260	1:41.3007
2	12	(Australia) Will Power W	1	1:41.5032	1:42.1811	1:41.3611
3	2	(United States) Josef Newgarden	1	1:42.2200	1:42.0044	1:41.6608
4	1	(France) Simon Pagenaud	2	1:41.9478	1:42.2853	1:42.0385
5	9	(New Zealand) Scott Dixon	2	1:42.0824	1:42.6584	1:42.9308
6	15	(United States) Graham Rahal	1	1:42.6474	1:42.6954	1:45.0464
7	8	(United Kingdom) Max Chilton	1	1:42.6074	1:42.7566	
8	27	(United States) Marco Andretti	1	1:42.7931	1:42.8614	
9	5	(Canada) James Hinchcliffe	2	1:42.7941	1:43.2105	
10	83	(United States) Charlie Kimball	2	1:42.4088	1:43.3221	
11	19	(United Arab Emirates) Ed Jones R	2	1:42.7865	1:43.7959	
12	28	(United States) Ryan Hunter-Reay	1	1:42.5181	1:43.9786	
13	14	(Colombia) Carlos Muñoz	1	1:42.9039		
14	20	(United States) Spencer Pigot	2	1:42.8875		
15	98	(United States) Alexander Rossi	1	1:43.0171		
16	10	(Brazil) Tony Kanaan	2	1:42.9077		
17	18	(Mexico) Esteban Gutiérrez R	1	1:43.1652		
18	21	(United States) J. R. Hildebrand	2	1:42.9132		
19	7	(Russia) Mikhail Aleshin	1	1:43.8891		
20	26	(Japan) Takuma Sato	2	1:43.4111		
21	4	(United States) Conor Daly	2	1:44.1579		
OFFICIAL BOX SCORE

Source for individual rounds:

=== Race ===
Pos	No.	Driver	Team	Engine	Laps	Time/Retired	Pit Stops	Grid	Laps Led	Pts.^{1}
1	9	(New Zealand) Scott Dixon	Chip Ganassi Racing	Honda	55	1:47:18.9870	3	5	24	53
2	2	(United States) Josef Newgarden	Team Penske	Chevrolet	55	+0.5779	3	3	13	41
3	3	(Brazil) Hélio Castroneves	Team Penske	Chevrolet	55	+4.1918	3	1	17	37
4	1	(France) Simon Pagenaud	Team Penske	Chevrolet	55	+4.9721	3	4		32
5	12	(Australia) Will Power W	Team Penske	Chevrolet	55	+5.7227	3	2		30
6	83	(United States) Charlie Kimball	Chip Ganassi Racing	Honda	55	+14.7178	3	10	1	29
7	19	(United Arab Emirates) Ed Jones R	Dale Coyne Racing	Honda	55	+21.6338	3	11		26
8	15	(United States) Graham Rahal	Rahal Letterman Lanigan Racing	Honda	55	+22.2273	4	6		24
9	8	(United Kingdom) Max Chilton	Chip Ganassi Racing	Honda	55	+23.3076	3	7		22
10	7	(Russia) Mikhail Aleshin	Schmidt Peterson Motorsports	Honda	55	+24.3586	4	19		20
11	14	(Colombia) Carlos Muñoz	A. J. Foyt Enterprises	Chevrolet	55	+26.1402	4	13		19
12	20	(United States) Spencer Pigot	Ed Carpenter Racing	Chevrolet	55	+33.4983	5	14		18
13	98	(United States) Alexander Rossi	Andretti Herta Autosport	Honda	55	+38.1370	4	15		17
14	28	(United States) Ryan Hunter-Reay	Andretti Autosport	Honda	55	+39.8433	3	12		16
15	4	(United States) Conor Daly	A. J. Foyt Enterprises	Chevrolet	55	+43.1988	4	21		15
16	21	(United States) J. R. Hildebrand	Ed Carpenter Racing	Chevrolet	55	+1:16.5039	4	18		14
17	18	(Mexico) Esteban Gutiérrez R	Dale Coyne Racing	Honda	55	+1:28.4634	5	17		13
18	27	(United States) Marco Andretti	Andretti Autosport	Honda	54	+1 Lap	5	8		12
19	26	(Japan) Takuma Sato	Andretti Autosport	Honda	54	+1 Lap	4	20		11
20	5	(Canada) James Hinchcliffe	Schmidt Peterson Motorsports	Honda	53	+2 Laps	5	9		10
21	10	(Brazil) Tony Kanaan	Chip Ganassi Racing	Honda	44	Contact	4	16		9
OFFICIAL BOX SCORE

^{1} Points include 1 point for leading at least 1 lap during a race, an additional 2 points for leading the most race laps, and 1 point for Pole Position.

Source for time gaps:

== Championship standings ==
Driver standings

	Pos	Driver	Points
	1	(New Zealand) Scott Dixon	379
	2	(France) Simon Pagenaud	345
1	3	(Brazil) Hélio Castroneves	342
1	4	(Japan) Takuma Sato	323
2	5	(United States) Josef Newgarden	318

Manufacturer standings

Pos	Manufacturer	Points
1	(Japan) Honda	820
2	(United States) Chevrolet	774

- Note: Only the top five positions are included.

Previous race: 2017 Rainguard Water Sealers 600	IndyCar Series; 2017 season	Next race: 2017 Iowa Corn 300
Previous race: 2016 Kohler Grand Prix	Kohler Grand Prix	Next race: 2018 Kohler Grand Prix
