= J. R. Hildebrand =

American racing driver

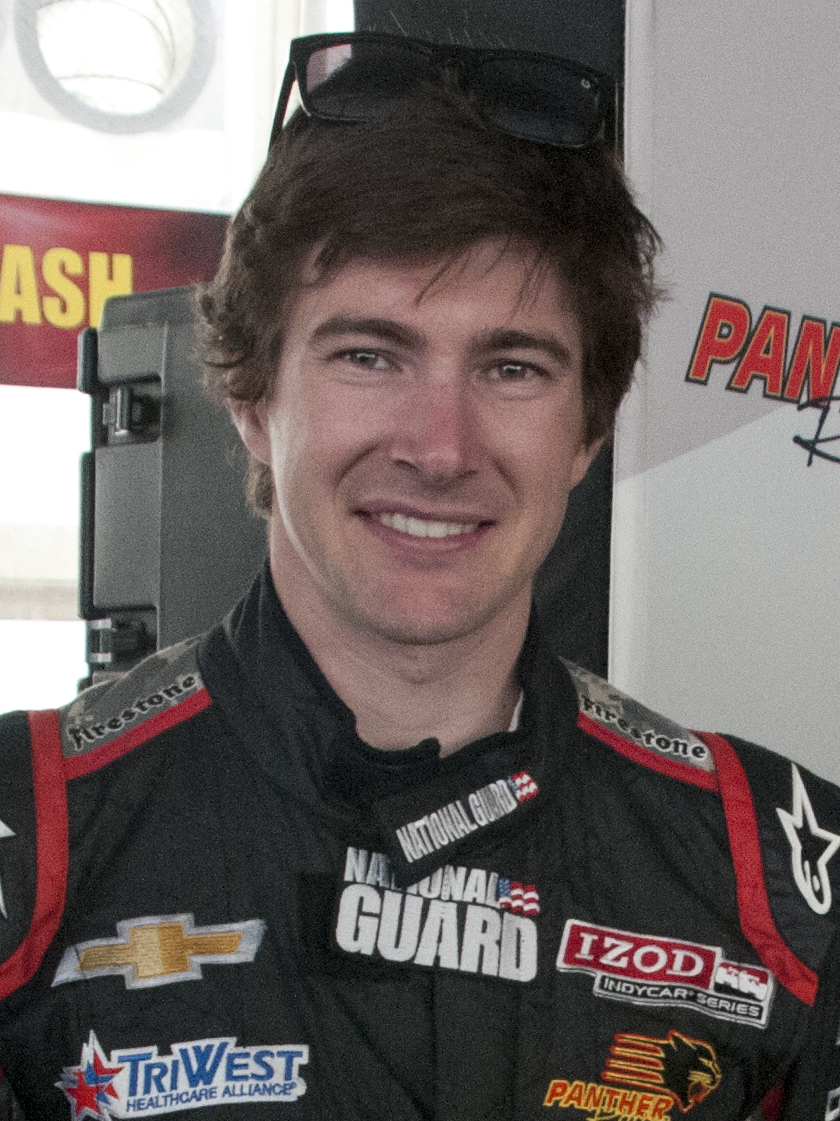
- Hildebrand at the 2013 Grand Prix of Long Beach
- Nationality: (United States) American
- Born: John Randal Hildebrand Jr. January 3, 1988 (age 38) Sausalito, California, U.S.
- Categorisation: FIA Gold

Previous series
- 2019 2009 2008–09 2007 2005–2006 2005 2004: Americas Rallycross Championship; Firestone Indy Lights; A1 Grand Prix; Champ Car Atlantic Series; U.S. F2000; Formula Palmer Audi Autumn Cup; SCCA Formula Russell

Championship titles
- 2009 2006 2004: Firestone Indy Lights; U.S. F2000; SCCA Formula Russell

Awards
- 2005 2011: Team USA Scholarship; Indianapolis 500 Rookie of the Year

IndyCar Series career
- 68 races run over 13 years
- 2022 position: 30th
- Best finish: 11th (2012)
- First race: 2010 Honda Indy 200 (Mid-Ohio)
- Last race: 2022 Indianapolis 500 (Indianapolis)
Wins	Podiums	Poles
0	3	0

John Randal Hildebrand Jr. (born January 3, 1988) is an American former race car driver. He last competed in the IndyCar Series driving part-time in the No. 11 Chevrolet for AJ Foyt Enterprises. Hildebrand won the 2009 Indy Lights championship and came close to winning the 2011 Indianapolis 500, hitting the wall on the final corner of the race and crossing the line in second place.

== Early career ==
At the age of fourteen, Hildebrand started racing go karts in the Jim Russell Arrive and Drive Championship at Infineon Raceway in Northern California; winning not only his first race but the championship that year. In 2003, he raced in the Jr. 80cc Shifter class finishing a close second, and at the end of that year made the transition from karts to cars by winning the Jim Russell Graduate Runoffs; racing in Formula Russell in 2004. That year, he went on to win the series championship; also participating in the Red Bull Driver Search. He then moved up to Pacific F2000 in 2005; finishing second overall as rookie of the year, also being chosen for the Team USA Scholarship, earning him a ride in the Formula Palmer Audi Autumn Trophy, in which he finished third. In 2006, he dominated the U.S. F2000 National Championship; winning the championship and twelve out of fourteen races.

In recognition of his impressive 2006 performance, Hildebrand won the Gorsline Scholarship and was elected to the AARWBA All American Auto Racing First Team.

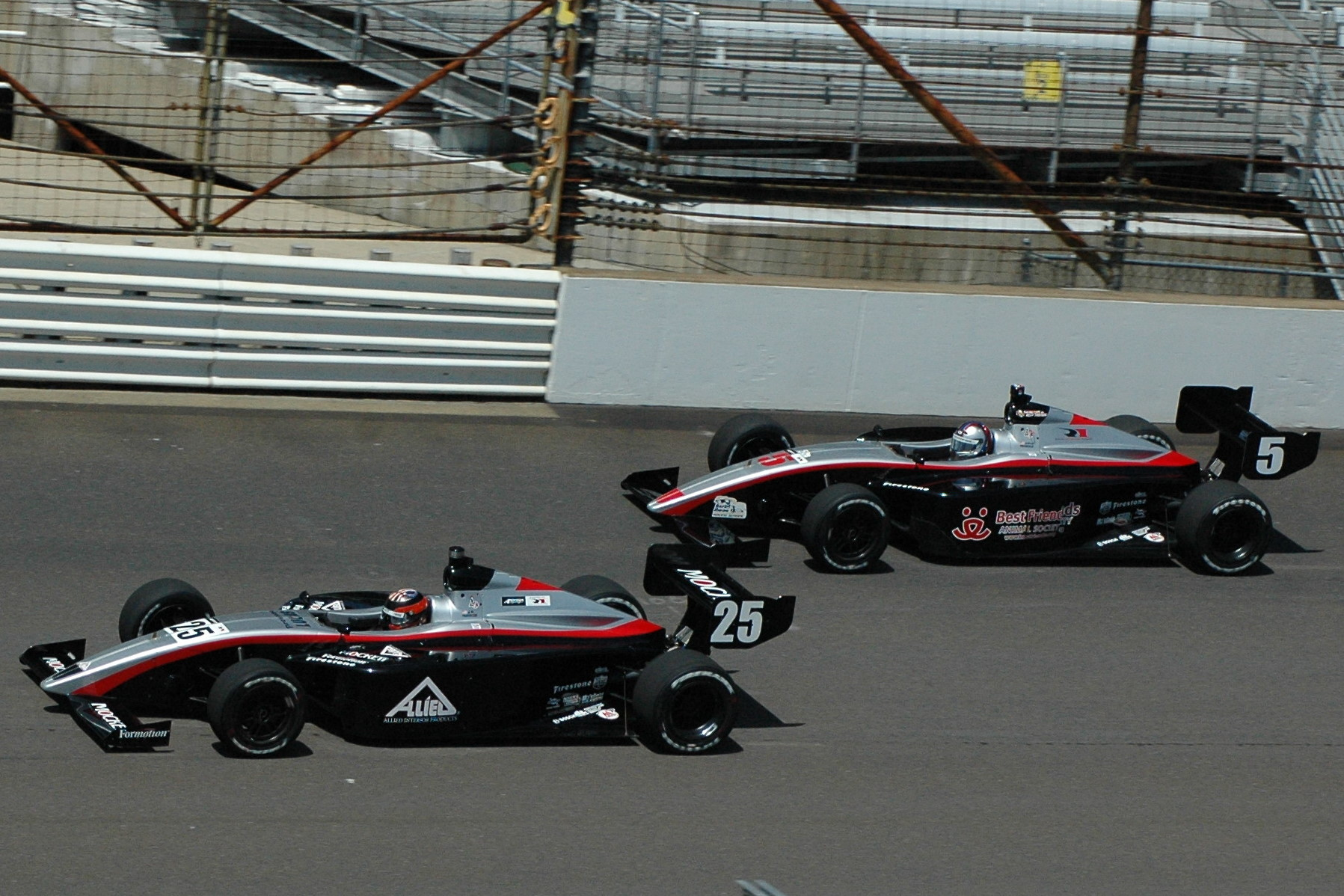
Hildebrand (inside) racing alongside teammate Andrew Prendeville in the 2008 Firestone Freedom 100

== Atlantics and Indy Lights ==
For 2007, Hildebrand moved to the Champ Car Atlantic series, driving for Newman Wachs Racing. He finished seventh in points and was the top US rookie in the series. After the season's conclusion he made two starts for RLR-Andersen Racing in the Indy Pro Series. Hildebrand then went on to contest the entire series schedule, which was renamed the Firestone Indy Lights Series, for RLR-Andersen in 2008. He captured his first series win in the fourth race of the season at Kansas Speedway, his second start on an oval. He finished fifth overall in the 2008 championship.

For the 2009 season, Hildebrand signed with defending championship-winning team AGR-AFS Racing, and after winning four races and taking five pole positions, he eventually claimed the title at the penultimate round at Chicagoland. That year, he also competed in the final round of the A1 Grand Prix series for A1 Team USA at Brands Hatch, finishing fourth in the Sprint race. He was again elected to the AARWBA All American Auto Racing First Team for 2009.

== American Le Mans Series ==
American Le Mans Series' Genoa Racing signed Hildebrand to race an LMPC class car for 2010. He contested the 12 Hours of Sebring and the Long Beach Grand Prix.

== Formula One ==
Hildebrand spent three days testing for the Force India Formula One team in December 2009, at the Jerez circuit, in a car shared with Paul di Resta.

== IndyCar ==
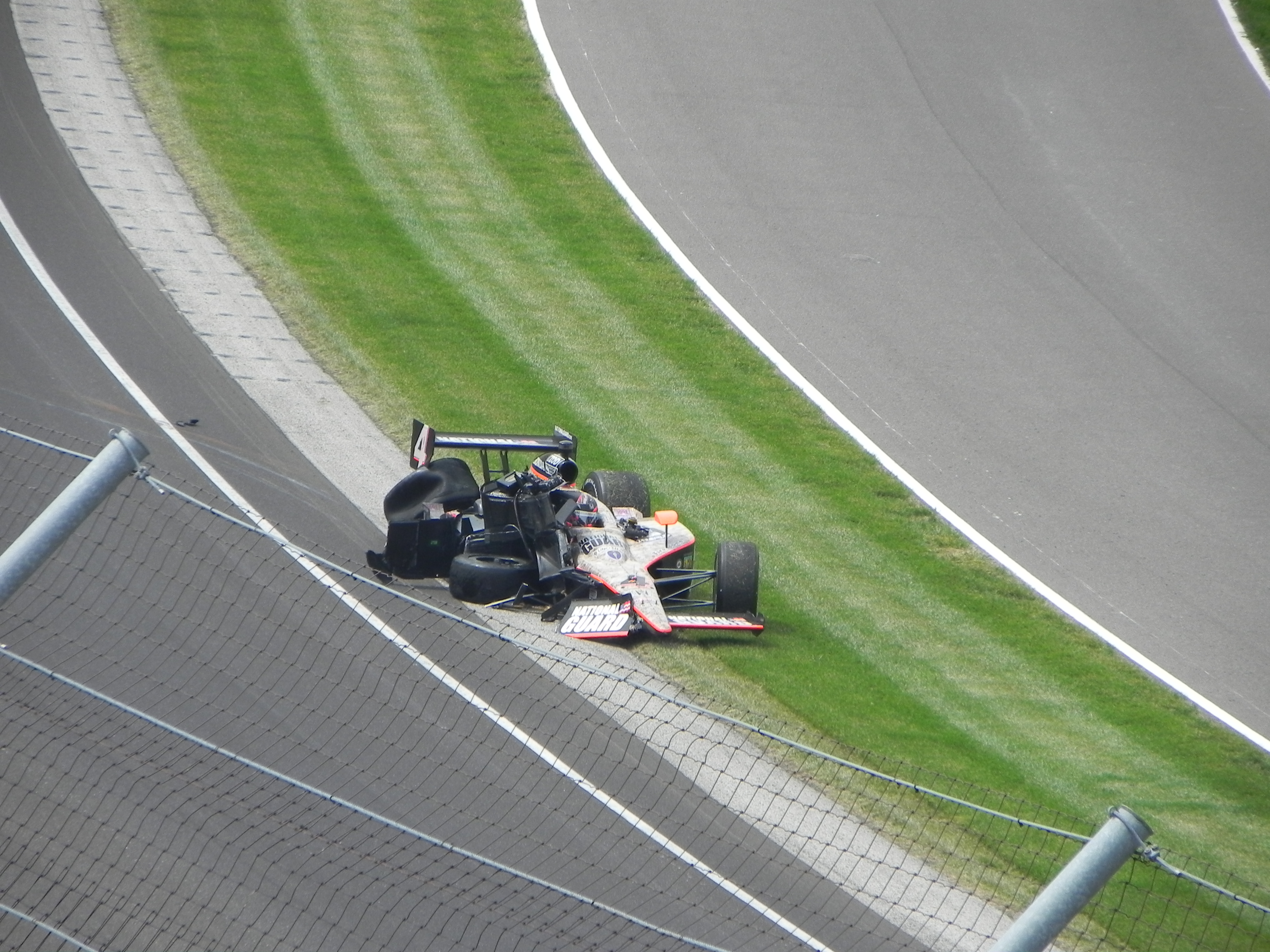
Hildebrand crashed on the final lap of the 2011 Indianapolis 500.

Hildebrand made his IndyCar Series debut in 2010, competing in two races for Dreyer & Reinbold Racing as a substitute driver for the injured Mike Conway. On Tuesday, December 14, 2010, it was announced that Hildebrand signed a multi–year contract to drive the No. 4 National Guard entry for Panther Racing, starting in 2011 after impressing the team during a test.

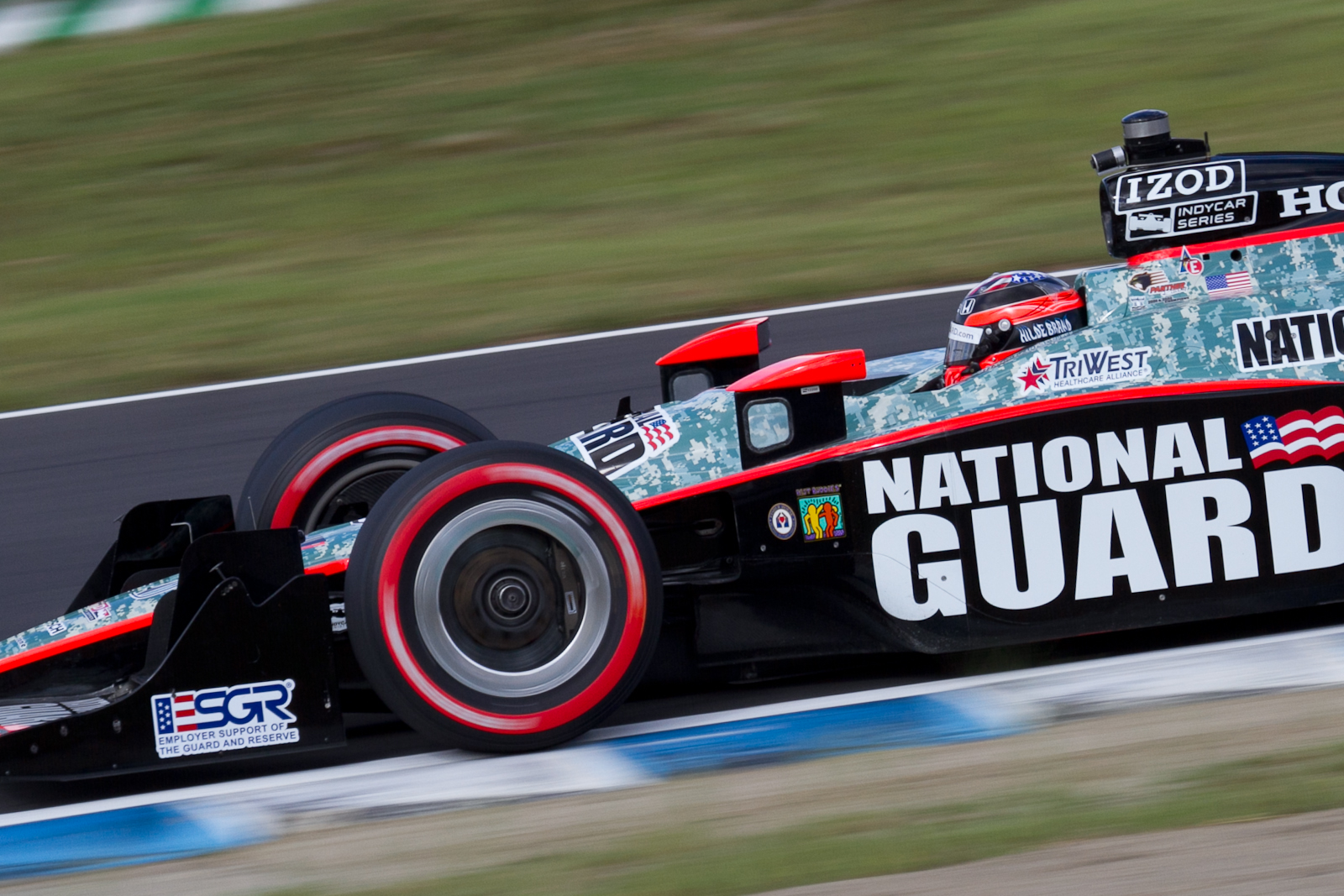
Hildebrand driving for Panther Racing at the 2011 Indy Japan 300.

Later in 2011, Hildebrand qualified for the Indianapolis 500 and was the most successful rookie during his premiere race. Hildebrand was able to lead at the halfway point for Panther Racing and stayed on the lead lap for the entire race. This allowed him to take a gamble during his last pit stop, stretching out his fuel load to an eventual lead on the final lap. On the very last turn, he slid out of the racing lane and into the retaining wall while passing rapidly slowing Charlie Kimball, allowing Dan Wheldon to take the victory. Despite the damage to his car – including the loss of a wheel – Hildebrand retained enough speed to cross the finish line in second place.

On October 16, 2011, Hildebrand was involved in a fifteen-car chain-reaction crash at Las Vegas Motor Speedway in the season-ending IZOD IndyCar World Championships. He sustained an injured sternum and was transported by ground ambulance to a Las Vegas area hospital, where he was admitted for treatment. The crash claimed the life of two-time Indy 500 winner and 2005 IndyCar Series champion Dan Wheldon.

Following a last-place finish in the 2013 Indianapolis 500, Hildebrand was released by Panther Racing. He had announced earlier in the year that he would be running selected Formula DRIFT races as a teammate to Tyler McQuarrie.

In 2014, Hildebrand joined Ed Carpenter Racing for the Indianapolis 500, driving the No. 21. On November 4, 2016, it was confirmed that Hildebrand would take over the Ed Carpenter Racing No. 21 car for the 2017 season, replacing Josef Newgarden. He finished 15th in the points standing for the season, achieving a second-place finish in Iowa and a third in Phoenix. Following the season Hildebrand was not retained by the team.

For 2018, Hildebrand was signed for by Dreyer & Reinbold Racing to pilot their car in the Indy 500 (their only entry of the season) and finished eleventh. He returned in the same role in 2019, finishing twentieth. He again returned in 2020 for the same one-race role, despite the team's increased commitment to a part-time schedule. He finished in 16th.

In 2021, Hildebrand drove a specially liveried car for A.J. Foyt Enterprises, commemorating the sixtieth anniversary of team owner A.J. Foyt's first of four Indianapolis 500 wins. He finished in fifteenth place. Hildebrand drove for the team for two races in 2022, finishing fourteenth at Texas and twelfth in the Indianapolis 500. After competing in every Indianapolis 500 since 2011, Hildebrand would not compete in the 2023 running of the race but would express interest in competing in 2024. However, 2022 remains his most recent Indianapolis 500 start.

== Pikes Peak Hillclimb ==
In 2018, Hildebrand competed in the Pikes Peak Hillclimb, driving a Porsche Cayman GT4 Clubsport, finishing 2nd in Porsche Trophy category behind Travis Pastrana.

In 2021 it was quietly announced Hildebrand would compete in the Open Wheel Class, driving an IndyCar. That effort fell through due to numerous technicalities which could not be overcome in time to compete.

On February 1, 2022, it was announced Hildebrand had entered the 2022 running of the event, competing in the Open Wheel Class, driving a 2022 Dallara IR18 Evo IndyCar. While not an IndyCar sanctioned event, all of the IndyCar suppliers are involved in it, as well as chassis manufacturer Dallara.

Hildebrand ran the 2025 Hill Climb in his own 1998 Kyle Petty Hot Wheels NASCAR Pontiac Grand Prix. The car was a crowd favorite.

== Personal life ==
In 2006, Hildebrand graduated from Redwood High School in Larkspur, California as a National Merit Scholar. While in high school, he also played varsity baseball. He applied and was accepted by several top universities, including the University of California Los Angeles (UCLA), Berkeley, and the Massachusetts Institute of Technology (MIT). MIT granted a three-year deferral, but he eventually allowed it to lapse as he continued to pursue his racing career.

== Racing record ==
=== American open–wheel racing results ===
(key)

==== USF2000 National Championship ====
Year	Entrant	1	2	3	4	5	6	7	8	9	10	11	12	13	14	Pos	Points
2006	Cape Motorsports	ATL1; 1	**ATL2**; 1	**MOH1**; 1	MOH2; 1	**PIR1**; 1	**PIR2**; 1	CLE1; 1	**CLE2**; 2	**TOR1**; 1	**TOR2**; 1	**MOH3**; 1	MOH4; 1	**ROA1**; 13	ROA2; 1	**1st**	**361**

==== Atlantic Championship ====
Year	Team	1	2	3	4	5	6	7	8	9	10	11	12	Rank	Points
2006	Newman Wachs Racing	LBH	HOU	MTY	POR	CLE1	CLE2	TOR	EDM	SJO	DEN	MTL	ROA; 19	43rd	2
2007	Newman Wachs Racing	LVG; 13	LBH; 30	HOU; 7	POR1; 6	POR2; 9	CLE; 2	MTT; 9	TOR; 19	EDM1; 21	EDM2; 5	SJO; 15	ROA; 9	7th	140
2008	Genoa Racing	LBH	LS	MTT	EDM1	EDM2	ROA1	ROA2	TRR	NJ	UTA	ATL; 15		26th	7

==== Indy Lights ====
Year	Team	1	2	3	4	5	6	7	8	9	10	11	12	13	14	15	16	Rank	Points
2007	RLR/Andersen Racing	HMS	STP1	STP2	INDY	MIL	IMS1	IMS2	IOW	WGL1	WGL2	NSH	MOH	KTY	SNM1; 22	SNM2; 20	CHI	37th	18
2008	RLR/Andersen Racing	HMS; 10	STP1; 5	STP2; 2	KAN; 1	INDY; 24	MIL; 5	IOW; 8	WGL1; 19	WGL2; 9	NSH; 4	MOH1; 5	MOH2; 6	KTY; 18	SNM1; 4	SNM2; 4	CHI; 22	5th	409
2009	AGR-AFS Racing	**STP1**; 3	STP2; 21	**LBH**; 1	KAN; 14	INDY; 2	MIL; 2	**IOW**; 6	WGL; 1	TOR; 2	**EDM**; 1	**KTY**; 17	MOH; 3	**SNM**; 1	CHI; 5	HMS; 2		1st	545

==== IndyCar Series ====
Year	Team	No.	Chassis	Engine	1	2	3	4	5	6	7	8	9	10	11	12	13	14	15	16	17	18	19	Rank	Points	Ref
2010	Dreyer & Reinbold Racing	24	Dallara IR-05	Honda	SAO	STP	ALA	LBH	KAN	INDY	TXS	IOW	WGL	TOR	EDM	MOH; 16	SNM; 24	CHI	KTY	MOT	HMS			35th	26	
2011	Panther Racing	4	Dallara IR-05	Honda	STP; 11	ALA; 13	LBH; 17	SAO; 10	INDY; 2	TXS; 23	TXS; 18	MIL; 21	IOW; 4	TOR; 8	EDM; 11	MOH; 25	NHM; 21	SNM; 23	BAL; 19	MOT; 7	KTY; 20	LVS^{1} C		14th	296	
2012	Panther Racing	4	Dallara DW12	Chevrolet	STP; 19	ALA; 15	LBH; 5	SAO; 7	INDY; 14	DET; 14	TXS; 5	MIL; 22	IOW; 22	TOR; 7	EDM; 21	MOH; 9	SNM; 8	BAL; 12	FON; 11					11th	294	
2013	Panther Racing	4	Dallara DW12	Chevrolet	STP; 19	ALA; 17	LBH; 5	SAO; 15	INDY; 33	DET	DET	TXS	MIL	IOW	POC	TOR	TOR	MOH						25th	112	
2013	Barracuda Racing	98	Dallara DW12	Honda															SNM; 16	BAL	HOU	HOU	FON; 11	25th	112	
2014	Ed Carpenter Racing	21	Dallara DW12	Chevrolet	STP	LBH	ALA	IMS	INDY; 10	DET	DET	TXS	HOU	HOU	POC	IOW	TOR	TOR	MOH	MIL	SNM	FON		26th	66	
2015	CFH Racing	6	Dallara DW12	Chevrolet	STP	NLA	LBH	ALA	IMS; 21	INDY; 8	DET	DET	TXS	TOR	FON	MIL	IOW	MOH	POC	SNM				31st	57	
2016	Ed Carpenter Racing	6	Dallara DW12	Chevrolet	STP	PHX	LBH	ALA	IMS; 22	INDY; 6	DET	DET	RDA	IOW	TOR	MOH	POC	TXS	WGL	SNM				23rd	84	
2017	Ed Carpenter Racing	21	Dallara DW12	Chevrolet	STP; 13	LBH; 11	ALA	PHX; 3	IMS; 14	INDY; 16	DET; 17	DET; 18	TEX; 12	ROA; 16	IOW; 2	TOR; 13	MOH; 17	POC; 19	GTW; 18	WGL; 15	SNM; 14			15th	347	
2018	Dreyer & Reinbold Racing	66	Dallara DW12	Chevrolet	STP	PHX	LBH	ALA	IMS	INDY; 11	DET	DET	TXS	RDA	IOW	TOR	MOH	POC	GTW	POR	SNM			33rd	38	
2019	Dreyer & Reinbold Racing	48	Dallara DW12	Chevrolet	STP	COA	ALA	LBH	IMS	INDY; 20	DET	DET	TXS	RDA	TOR	IOW	MOH	POC	GTW	POR	LAG			33rd	20	
2020	Dreyer & Reinbold Racing	67	Dallara DW12	Chevrolet	TXS	IMS	ROA	ROA	IOW	IOW	INDY; 16	GTW	GTW	MOH	MOH	IMS	IMS	STP						30th	28	
2021	A. J. Foyt Enterprises	1	Dallara DW12	Chevrolet	ALA	STP	TXS	TXS	IMS	INDY; 15	DET	DET	ROA	MOH	NSH	IMS	GTW	POR	LAG	LBH				33rd	30	
2022	A. J. Foyt Enterprises	11	Dallara DW12	Chevrolet	STP	TXS; 14	LBH	ALA	IMS	INDY; 12	DET	ROA	MOH	TOR	IOW	IOW	IMS	NSH	GTW	POR	LAG			30th	53	

^{*} Season still in progress.

^{1} Race cancelled due to death of Dan Wheldon

Years	Teams	Races	Poles	Wins	Podiums (non-win)	Top 10s (non-podium)	Indianapolis 500 wins	Championships
8	5	56	0	0	3	14	0	0

** Podium (non-win) indicates 2nd or 3rd place finishes.
*** Top 10s (non-podium) indicates 4th through 10th place finishes.

==== Indianapolis 500 ====
Year	Chassis	Engine	Start	Finish	Team
2011	Dallara	Honda	12	2	Panther Racing
2012	Dallara	Chevrolet	18	14	Panther Racing
2013	Dallara	Chevrolet	10	33	Panther Racing
2014	Dallara	Chevrolet	9	10	Ed Carpenter Racing
2015	Dallara	Chevrolet	10	8	CFH Racing
2016	Dallara	Chevrolet	15	6	Ed Carpenter Racing
2017	Dallara	Chevrolet	6	16	Ed Carpenter Racing
2018	Dallara	Chevrolet	27	11	Dreyer & Reinbold Racing
2019	Dallara	Chevrolet	21	20	Dreyer & Reinbold Racing
2020	Dallara	Chevrolet	32	16	Dreyer & Reinbold Racing
2021	Dallara	Chevrolet	22	15	A. J. Foyt Enterprises
2022	Dallara	Chevrolet	17	12	A. J. Foyt Enterprises

=== Complete American Le Mans Series results ===
Year	Entrant	Class	Chassis	Engine	Tyres	1	2	3	4	5	6	7	8	9	Rank	Points
2010	Genoa Racing	LMPC	Oreca FLM09	Chevrolet 6.2L V8	**M**	SEB ovr:25 cls:2	LNB ovr:7 cls:3	MON	UTA	LIM	MID	AME	MOS	PET	17th	36

=== Pikes Peak International Hill Climb ===
Year	Car	Time	Pos.	Class Pos.
2018	Porsche Cayman GT4 Clubsport	10:39.301	29th	2nd
2025	1999 Pontiac Grand Prix (NASCAR)	4:24:212	16th	4th
2026	2026 Chevrolet Corvette ZR1X	9:30.104	9th	1st

=== American rallycross racing results ===
==== Complete Americas Rallycross results ====
(key)

Year	Entrant	Car	No.	Driver	1	2	3	4	5	6	7	8	9	ARX2	Points
2019					MOH		GAT		TRR		COTA	MOH			
2019	Dreyer & Reinbold Racing	Olsbergs MSE	48	(United States) **J. R. Hildebrand**	4	4	3	4						9th	**79**

=== Complete WeatherTech SportsCar Championship results ===
(key) (Races in bold indicate pole position; races in italics indicate fastest lap)

Year	Entrant	Class	Make	Engine	1	2	3	4	5	6	7	8	9	10	11	12	Rank	Points
2021	NTE Sport	GTD	Audi R8 LMS Evo	Audi 5.2 L V10	DAY; 15	SEB	MOH	DET	WGL	WGL	LIM	ELK; 11	LGA	LBH	VIR	PET	42nd	394

Sporting positions
Preceded by Raphael Matos	Firestone Indy Lights; Champion; 2009	Succeeded by Jean-Karl Vernay
Awards and achievements
Preceded by Simona de Silvestro	Indianapolis 500; Rookie of the Year; 2011	Succeeded by Rubens Barrichello
