= 2017 IndyCar Series =

American auto racing season

2017 IndyCar season
- Verizon IndyCar Series

Season
- Races: 17
- Start date: March 12
- End date: September 17

Awards
- Drivers' champion: (United States) Josef Newgarden
- Manufacturers' Cup: (United States) Chevrolet
- Rookie of the Year: (United Arab Emirates) Ed Jones
- Indianapolis 500 winner: (Japan) Takuma Sato

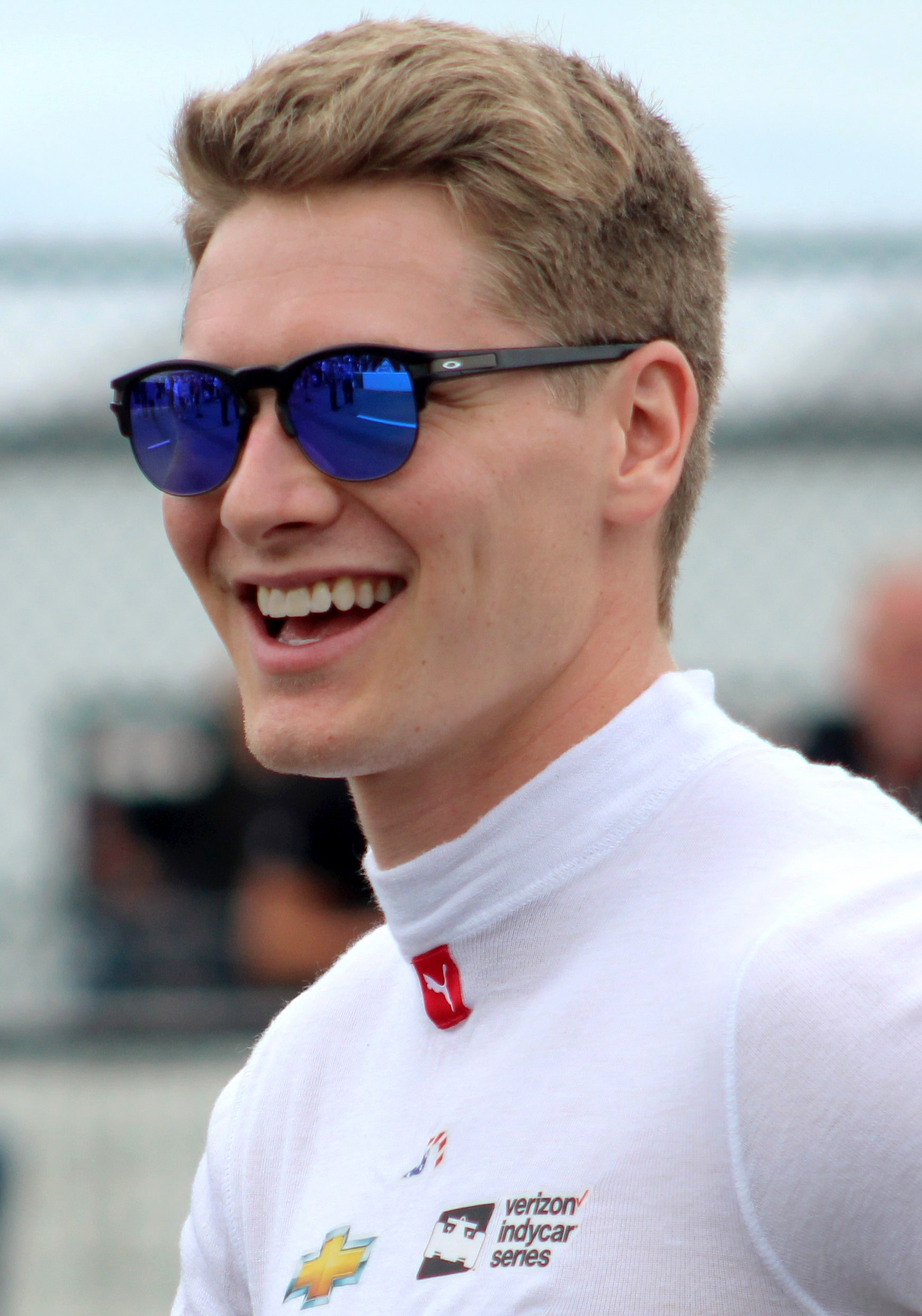
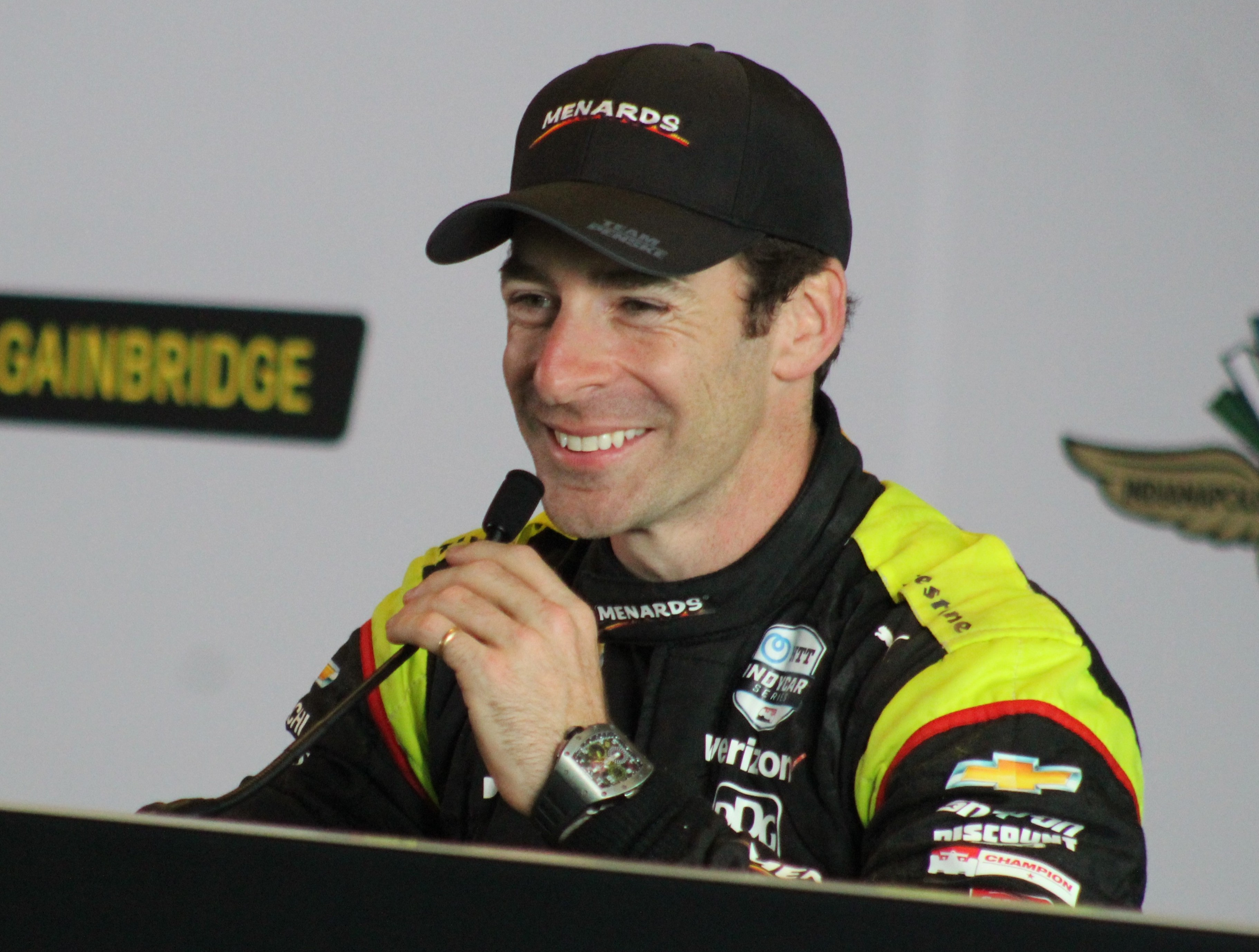
Josef Newgarden (left) won his first Drivers' Championship while Simon Pagenaud (right) finished second in the championship.

The 2017 Verizon IndyCar Series was the 22nd season of the Verizon IndyCar Series and the 106th official championship season of American open-wheel racing. The premier event was the 101st Indianapolis 500 won by Takuma Sato. Josef Newgarden, the 2011 Indy Lights champion, in his sixth full-time season in the IndyCar Series, won the championship. It was Newgarden's first season as part of Team Penske, and he collected four wins, one pole position, and ten top-five finishes. It was Team Penske's 15th Indy car season championship, and third in four years.

Simon Pagenaud entered the season as the defending IndyCar champion, and finished second in points behind his teammate Newgarden. The 2017 season was the final season for the Honda/Chevy aerokits introduced in 2015, as 2018 saw the introduction of a new spec-aerokit.

All events from 2016 returned to the schedule. In addition, the series returned to Gateway Motorsports Park for the first time since 2003.

== Series news ==
- On September 2, 2016, it was announced that Performance Friction Brakes has been selected as a brake rotor and pad supplier package for IndyCar Series starting from 2017 season onwards but Brembo remained as brake caliper until the end of 2017 season.

== Confirmed entries ==
The following teams, entries, and drivers have been announced to compete in the 2017 Verizon IndyCar Series season. All teams will use a spec Dallara DW12 chassis with manufacturer aero kits and Firestone tires.

Team	Engine	No.	Driver(s)	Round(s)
A. J. Foyt Enterprises	Chevrolet	4	(United States) Conor Daly	All
A. J. Foyt Enterprises	Chevrolet	14	(Colombia) Carlos Muñoz	All
A. J. Foyt Enterprises	Chevrolet	40	(United States) Zach Veach R	6
Andretti Autosport	Honda	26	(Japan) Takuma Sato	All
Andretti Autosport	Honda	27	(United States) Marco Andretti	All
Andretti Autosport	Honda	28	(United States) Ryan Hunter-Reay	All
McLaren-Honda-Andretti	Honda	29	(Spain) Fernando Alonso R	6
Andretti Herta Autosport with Curb Agajanian	Honda	98	(United States) Alexander Rossi	All
Chip Ganassi Racing	Honda	8	(United Kingdom) Max Chilton	All
Chip Ganassi Racing	Honda	9	(New Zealand) Scott Dixon	All
Chip Ganassi Racing	Honda	10	(Brazil) Tony Kanaan	All
Chip Ganassi Racing	Honda	83	(United States) Charlie Kimball	All
Dale Coyne Racing	Honda	18	(France) Sébastien Bourdais	1–6, 15–17
Dale Coyne Racing	Honda	18	(Australia) James Davison R (Note: James Davison is considered a rookie in the IndyCar Series; however, he was not a rookie in the 2017 Indianapolis 500 as he participated in the Indy 500 in 2014 and 2015.)	6
Dale Coyne Racing	Honda	18	(Mexico) Esteban Gutiérrez R	7–8, 10–14
Dale Coyne Racing	Honda	18	(France) Tristan Vautier	9
Dale Coyne Racing	Honda	19	(United Arab Emirates) Ed Jones R	All
Dale Coyne Racing	Honda	63	(United Kingdom) Pippa Mann	6
Dreyer & Reinbold Racing	Chevrolet	24	(United States) Sage Karam	6
Ed Carpenter Racing	Chevrolet	20	(United States) Spencer Pigot	1–3, 5, 7–8, 10, 12–13, 16–17
Ed Carpenter Racing	Chevrolet	20	(United States) Ed Carpenter	4, 6, 9, 11, 14–15
Ed Carpenter Racing	Chevrolet	21	(United States) J. R. Hildebrand	1–2, 4–17
Ed Carpenter Racing	Chevrolet	21	(United States) Zach Veach R	3
Harding Racing	Chevrolet	88	(Colombia) Gabby Chaves	6, 9, 14
Juncos Racing	Chevrolet	11	(United States) Spencer Pigot	6
Juncos Racing	Chevrolet	17	(Colombia) Sebastián Saavedra	6
Lazier Partners Racing	Chevrolet	44	(United States) Buddy Lazier	6
Michael Shank Racing with Andretti Autosport	Honda	50	(United Kingdom) Jack Harvey R	6
Rahal Letterman Lanigan Racing	Honda	13	(Canada) Zachary Claman DeMelo R	17
Rahal Letterman Lanigan Racing	Honda	15	(United States) Graham Rahal	All
Rahal Letterman Lanigan Racing	Honda	16	(Spain) Oriol Servià	6–8
Schmidt Peterson Motorsports	Honda	5	(Canada) James Hinchcliffe	All
Schmidt Peterson Motorsports	Honda	7	(Russia) Mikhail Aleshin (Note: In conjunction with Marotti Autosport at indy)	1–11, 13
Schmidt Peterson Motorsports	Honda	7	(Canada) Robert Wickens R	10 (Note: Practiced in relief of Aleshin)
Schmidt Peterson Motorsports	Honda	7	(Colombia) Sebastián Saavedra	12, 14–15
Schmidt Peterson Motorsports	Honda	7	(United Kingdom) Jack Harvey R	16–17
Schmidt Peterson Motorsports	Honda	77	(United Kingdom) Jay Howard	6
Team Penske	Chevrolet	1	(France) Simon Pagenaud	All
Team Penske	Chevrolet	2	(United States) Josef Newgarden	All
Team Penske	Chevrolet	3	(Brazil) Hélio Castroneves	All
Team Penske	Chevrolet	12	(Australia) Will Power	All
Team Penske	Chevrolet	22	(Colombia) Juan Pablo Montoya	5–6

=== Team changes ===
- Chip Ganassi Racing announced their discount retail giants sponsor Target, effective from the 2017 IndyCar season, has discontinued sponsorship after 27 straight years of direct participation. The team also announced on October 7, 2016, that they would be returning to Honda in a multi-year deal and thus discontinuing Chevrolet partnership. Ganassi had previously worked with Honda in 1996–99 (CART) and 2006–13 (IndyCar Series), when Jimmy Vasser, Alessandro Zanardi, Juan Pablo Montoya, Scott Dixon and Dario Franchitti won the CART and IndyCar title.
- Larry Foyt, president of A. J. Foyt Enterprises, confirmed on October 13 that the team was switching manufacturers from Honda to Chevrolet, with the formal announcement on January 17.
- KV Racing Technology will not race in 2017 due to Kevin Kalkhoven and James Sullivan withdrawing funding from the team. The team had been in negotiations with Carlin to sell their remaining equipment, but attempts to secure Indy Lights champion Ed Jones and Mikhail Aleshin fell through.
- On February 21, Juncos Racing confirmed it would field an entry for the 101st Indy 500 with support from Kevin Kalkhoven, following purchase of three cars and equipment from KV Racing Technology. The team entered two cars into the 101st Indy 500, opting to postpone the announcement of their drivers and engine partner until later. On May 9, the team announced that the first of their two entries would be driven by Spencer Pigot. Pigot had previously driven for the team in Indy Lights. On May 10, the team announced that Sebastián Saavedra would drive in the second car.
- On April 10, Harding Racing confirmed it would field an entry for the 101st Indy 500, driven by Gabby Chaves. On May 20, the team announced that it would also race at Texas Motor Speedway and Pocono Raceway in preparation for a possible full-season entry for 2018.

=== Driver changes ===
- On October 5, Team Penske announced that it had signed Josef Newgarden to drive the No. 2 car for 2017, demoting Juan Pablo Montoya to part-time driver status.
- On October 12, Dale Coyne Racing announced that it had signed Sébastien Bourdais to drive the No. 18 car for two seasons, replacing Conor Daly. Bourdais had driven for Coyne in 2011 after two seasons in Formula One.
- On October 31, Takuma Sato's manager confirmed that the Japanese driver would join Andretti Autosport as the driver of the No. 26 car for 2017, replacing Carlos Muñoz. The deal was officially announced by the team on December 2.
- Also on October 31, Team Penske announced Juan Pablo Montoya would return to the team to compete in the Indianapolis 500. The team later announced that Montoya would also be entered in the IndyCar Grand Prix.
- On November 4, it was confirmed that J. R. Hildebrand would take over the Ed Carpenter Racing No. 21 car for the 2017 season, replacing Josef Newgarden.
- On November 14, it was confirmed that 2016 Indy Lights champion Ed Jones signed with Dale Coyne Racing for the 2017 season to drive the No. 19 car, replacing Luca Filippi, Gabby Chaves, Pippa Mann, and R.C. Enerson.
- On November 15, A. J. Foyt Enterprises announced that Carlos Muñoz and Conor Daly would drive the teams No. 14 and No. 4 cars, respectively for the 2017 season, replacing Takuma Sato and Jack Hawksworth. Conor Daly debuted for Foyt in the 2013 Indianapolis 500.
- On January 16, news broke that Mikhail Aleshin had run into problems with his sponsor, placing his return for 2017 in doubt. Auto GP champion Luis Michael Dörrbecker and former Chip Ganassi Racing driver Sage Karam were in the picture for this seat as a replacement. However, on February 1, it was confirmed that Aleshin's sponsorship issues had been resolved and that he would return to the team for 2017.
- On February 2, Dreyer & Reinbold Racing announced that Sage Karam would return to the team to compete in the Indianapolis 500.
- On March 6, Schmidt Peterson Motorsports announced that Jay Howard would drive the No. 77 Honda in the Indianapolis 500. The entry would be supported by 1997 IndyCar Champion Tony Stewart.
- On March 28, Dale Coyne Racing announced that Pippa Mann would drive the No. 63 Honda in the Indianapolis 500. It would be the fifth consecutive year that Mann has driven for the team.
- On April 7, A. J. Foyt Enterprises announced that Firestone Indy Lights driver Zach Veach would drive the No. 40 Chevrolet at the Indianapolis 500.
- On April 9, Michael Shank Racing announced that Jack Harvey would drive the No. 50 Honda at the Indianapolis 500. The team would run with support from Andretti Autosport.
- On April 12, McLaren Honda announced a partnership with Andretti Autosport to enter a single car in the Indianapolis 500, to be driven by two-time F1 World Champion Fernando Alonso. The Spaniard skipped the Monaco Grand Prix in order to participate in the 500.
- On April 18, Ed Carpenter Racing announced that Zach Veach would fill in for J. R. Hildebrand for the race at Barber Motorsports Park. Hildebrand had suffered a broken bone in his left hand following an incident at the Grand Prix of Long Beach. Hildebrand was cleared to return for the following race at Phoenix International Raceway.
- On April 22, Buddy Lazier announced that he would be competing in the Indianapolis 500 for Lazier Partners Racing. It would be Lazier's 20th start in the race.
- On May 20, Sébastien Bourdais suffered multiple pelvic fractures and a fractured hip after a severe incident during qualifying for the Indy 500, forcing him to sit out the remainder of the season. The following day, Dale Coyne Racing announced that Indy 500 veteran James Davison would fill in for the 500.
- On June 1, Dale Coyne Racing announced that former Formula One driver Esteban Gutiérrez would pilot the No. 18 car at the Detroit Grand Prix. Following the race at Texas, Gutierrez was confirmed in the No. 18 car until Sébastien Bourdais' return at Gateway.
- On June 6, Dale Coyne Racing announced that Tristan Vautier would drive the No. 18 car at Texas Motor Speedway. Vautier was chosen after Gutiérrez was not able to complete an oval rookie test due to an IndyCar testing blackout period.
- On June 22, Schmidt Peterson Motorsports announced that Robert Wickens would drive the No. 7 car in place of Mikhail Aleshin for the Kohler Grand Prix due to issues with Aleshin's visa. Wickens partook in the first practice session, but Aleshin's visa issues were solved by Saturday, so Aleshin returned to the car for the rest of the weekend.
- On July 13, Schmidt Peterson Motorsports announced that Sebastián Saavedra would drive the No. 7 car in place of Mikhail Aleshin for the Honda Indy Toronto.
- On August 12, Schmidt Peterson Motorsports announced that Mikhail Aleshin would no longer race for the team. On August 16, the team announced that Sebastián Saavedra would return to the No. 7 car for the races at Pocono Raceway and Gateway Motorsports Park. On August 20, the team announced that Jack Harvey would drive the car for the final two races of the season at Watkins Glen and Sonoma.
- On August 23, Dale Coyne Racing announced that Sébastien Bourdais had recovered from his injuries sustained earlier in the season and would return to drive the final three races of the season.
- On September 6, Rahal Letterman Lanigan Racing announced that it would enter a second car for Zachary Claman DeMelo for the final race of the season at Sonoma.

== Schedule ==
All races were held in the United States, except the Toronto round.

Icon	Legend
O	Oval/Speedway
R	Road course
S	Street circuit

Rd.	Date	Race name	Track	City
1	March 12	Firestone Grand Prix of St. Petersburg	S Streets of St. Petersburg	St. Petersburg, Florida
2	April 9	Toyota Grand Prix of Long Beach	S Streets of Long Beach	Long Beach, California
3	April 23	Honda Indy Grand Prix of Alabama	R Barber Motorsports Park	Birmingham, Alabama
4	April 29	Desert Diamond West Valley Phoenix Grand Prix	O Phoenix International Raceway	Avondale, Arizona
5	May 13	IndyCar Grand Prix	R Indianapolis Motor Speedway Road Course	Speedway, Indiana
6	May 28	101st Indianapolis 500 presented by PennGrade	O Indianapolis Motor Speedway	Speedway, Indiana
7	June 3	Chevrolet Detroit Grand Prix presented by Lear Corporation	S The Raceway at Belle Isle Park	Detroit, Michigan
8	June 4	Chevrolet Detroit Grand Prix presented by Lear Corporation	S The Raceway at Belle Isle Park	Detroit, Michigan
9	June 10	Rainguard Water Sealers 600	O Texas Motor Speedway	Fort Worth, Texas
10	June 25	Kohler Grand Prix	R Road America	Elkhart Lake, Wisconsin
11	July 9	Iowa Corn 300	O Iowa Speedway	Newton, Iowa
12	July 16	Honda Indy Toronto	S Exhibition Place	Toronto, Ontario
13	July 30	Honda Indy 200	R Mid-Ohio Sports Car Course	Lexington, Ohio
14	August 20	ABC Supply 500	O Pocono Raceway	Long Pond, Pennsylvania
15	August 26	Bommarito Automotive Group 500 presented by Valvoline	O Gateway Motorsports Park	Madison, Illinois
16	September 3	Grand Prix at The Glen	R Watkins Glen International	Watkins Glen, New York
17	September 17	GoPro Grand Prix of Sonoma	R Sonoma Raceway	Sonoma, California

All 16 races from 2016 returned. Gateway Motorsports Park returns to the schedule for the first time since 2003. The only other schedule change is the move of the race at Phoenix from the first weekend in April to the last weekend in April to avoid a conflict with the Final Four being held in nearby Glendale, Arizona. The Long Beach race was the second race of the season as opposed to being the third race of the season in 2016.

The Grand Prix of Indianapolis was rebranded as the IndyCar Grand Prix for the 2017 running of the event following an announcement that Angie's List would no longer sponsor the event.

== Results ==
Rd.	Race	Pole position	Fastest lap	Most laps led	Race winners			Report
Rd.	Race	Pole position	Fastest lap	Most laps led	Driver	Team	Manufacturer	Report
1	St. Petersburg	(Australia) Will Power	(New Zealand) Scott Dixon	(France) Sébastien Bourdais	(France) Sébastien Bourdais	Dale Coyne Racing	Honda	Report
2	Long Beach	(Brazil) Hélio Castroneves	(Brazil) Hélio Castroneves	(New Zealand) Scott Dixon	(Canada) James Hinchcliffe	Schmidt Peterson Motorsports	Honda	Report
3	Birmingham	(Australia) Will Power	(Australia) Will Power	(Australia) Will Power	(United States) Josef Newgarden	Team Penske	Chevrolet	Report
4	Phoenix	(Brazil) Hélio Castroneves	(Australia) Will Power	(France) Simon Pagenaud	(France) Simon Pagenaud	Team Penske	Chevrolet	Report
5	Indianapolis GP	(Australia) Will Power	(United States) Josef Newgarden	(Australia) Will Power	(Australia) Will Power	Team Penske	Chevrolet	Report
6	Indianapolis 500	(New Zealand) Scott Dixon	(Japan) Takuma Sato	(United Kingdom) Max Chilton	(Japan) Takuma Sato	Andretti Autosport	Honda	Report
7	Detroit 1	(United States) Graham Rahal (Note: The qualification format for this race featured two separate qualification groups, with the fastest qualifier in each group earning a championship point; the faster of the two group fastest qualifiers would then start on pole, while the other would start from the outside of the front row. Rahal set the fastest overall lap, and was awarded the pole position. Hélio Castroneves set the fastest lap in the other qualifying group, and was also awarded a championship point.)	(United States) Josef Newgarden	(United States) Graham Rahal	(United States) Graham Rahal	Rahal Letterman Lanigan Racing	Honda	Report
8	Detroit 2	(Japan) Takuma Sato (Note: The qualification format for this race featured two separate qualification groups, with the fastest qualifier in each group earning a championship point; the faster of the two group fastest qualifiers would then start on pole, while the other would start from the outside of the front row. Sato set the fastest overall lap, and was awarded the pole position. Ryan Hunter-Reay set the fastest lap in the other qualifying group, and was also awarded a championship point.)	(United States) Josef Newgarden	(United States) Graham Rahal	(United States) Graham Rahal	Rahal Letterman Lanigan Racing	Honda	Report
9	Texas	(United States) Charlie Kimball	(Brazil) Tony Kanaan	(Australia) Will Power	(Australia) Will Power	Team Penske	Chevrolet	Report
10	Road America	(Brazil) Hélio Castroneves	(United States) Josef Newgarden	(New Zealand) Scott Dixon	(New Zealand) Scott Dixon	Chip Ganassi Racing	Honda	Report
11	Iowa	(Australia) Will Power	(Brazil) Hélio Castroneves	(Brazil) Hélio Castroneves	(Brazil) Hélio Castroneves	Team Penske	Chevrolet	Report
12	Toronto	(France) Simon Pagenaud	(France) Simon Pagenaud	(United States) Josef Newgarden	(United States) Josef Newgarden	Team Penske	Chevrolet	Report
13	Mid-Ohio	(Australia) Will Power	(United States) Alexander Rossi	(United States) Josef Newgarden	(United States) Josef Newgarden	Team Penske	Chevrolet	Report
14	Pocono	(Japan) Takuma Sato	(Brazil) Tony Kanaan	(New Zealand) Scott Dixon	(Australia) Will Power	Team Penske	Chevrolet	Report
15	Gateway	(Australia) Will Power	(United States) Josef Newgarden	(United States) Josef Newgarden	(United States) Josef Newgarden	Team Penske	Chevrolet	Report
16	Watkins Glen	(United States) Alexander Rossi	(France) Sébastien Bourdais	(United States) Alexander Rossi	(United States) Alexander Rossi	Andretti Herta Autosport with Curb Agajanian	Honda	Report
17	Sonoma	(United States) Josef Newgarden	(France) Simon Pagenaud	(France) Simon Pagenaud	(France) Simon Pagenaud	Team Penske	Chevrolet	Report

== Points standings ==
- Ties are broken by number of wins, followed by number of 2nds, 3rds, etc., then by number of pole positions, followed by number of times qualified 2nd, etc.

=== Driver standings ===
- One championship point is awarded to each driver who leads at least one race lap. Two additional championship points are awarded to the driver who leads most laps during a race.
- At all races except the Indy 500, the number 1 qualifier earns one point. At double header races, the fastest qualifier of each qualifying group earns one championship point.
- Entrant-initiated engine change-outs before the engines reach their required distance run will result in the loss of ten points.
  - NOTE: The distance run will be based on the total distance raced by that entrant with the engine in question, regardless of driver.

Pos	Driver	STP	LBH	BAR	PHX	IMS	INDY	BEL		TMS	ROA	IOW	TOR	MOH	POC	GTW	WGL	SON	Pts
1	(United States) Josef Newgarden	8	3	1	9	11	19^{22}	4	2	13	2	6	1*	1*	2	1*	18	**2**	642
2	(France) Simon Pagenaud	2	5	3	1*	4	14^{23}	16	5	3	4	7	**5**	4	4	3	9	1*	629
3	(New Zealand) Scott Dixon	3	4*	2	5	2	**32**^{1}	2	6	9	1*	8	10	9	6*	2	2	4	621
4	(Brazil) Hélio Castroneves	6	**9**	4	**4**	5	2^{19}	7	9	20	**3**	1*	8	7	7	4	4	5	598
5	(Australia) Will Power	**19**	13	**14***	2	**1***	23^{9}	18	3	1*	5	**4**	21	**2**	1	**20**	6	3	562
6	(United States) Graham Rahal	17	10	13	21	6	12^{14}	**1***	1*	4	8	5	9	3	9	12	5	6	522
7	(United States) Alexander Rossi	11	19	5	15	8	7^{3}	5	7	22	13	11	2	6	3	6	**1***	21	494
8	(Japan) Takuma Sato	5	18	9	16	12	1^{4}	8	**4**	10	19	16	16	5	**13**	19	19	20	441
9	(United States) Ryan Hunter-Reay	4	17	11	13	3	27^{10}	13	17	19	14	3	6	8	8	15	3	8	421
10	(Brazil) Tony Kanaan	12	15	7	6	20	5^{7}	15	10	2	21	9	19	16	5	16	20	16	403
11	(United Kingdom) Max Chilton	16	14	12	20	7	4*^{15}	11	15	8	9	14	7	15	18	17	8	12	396
12	(United States) Marco Andretti	7	20	21	18	16	8^{8}	12	13	6	18	17	4	12	11	14	16	7	388
13	(Canada) James Hinchcliffe	9	1	6	12	13	22^{17}	3	20	14	20	10	3	11	20	8	21	22	376
14	(United Arab Emirates) Ed Jones RY	10	6	16	11	19	3^{11}	9	22	17	7	18	20	21	17	13	13	19	354
15	(United States) J. R. Hildebrand	13	11		3	14	16^{6}	17	18	12	16	2	13	17	19	18	15	14	347
16	(Colombia) Carlos Muñoz	21	7	17	10	15	10^{24}	14	11	18	11	20	15	18	10	9	10	15	328
17	(United States) Charlie Kimball	18	21	15	8	21	25^{16}	21	8	**21**	6	15	12	13	16	7	7	11	327
18	(United States) Conor Daly	15	16	18	14	17	30^{26}	22	12	7	15	19	17	10	14	5	11	10	305
19	(Russia) Mikhail Aleshin	14	12	10	17	18	13^{13}	6	16	15	10	21		14					237
20	(United States) Spencer Pigot	20	8	20		9	18^{29}	10	21		12		18	19			12	13	218
21	(France) Sébastien Bourdais	1*	2	8	19	22	Wth									10	17	9	214
22	(United States) Ed Carpenter				7		11^{2}			11		12			12	21			169
23	(Colombia) Gabby Chaves						9^{25}			5					15				98
24	(Colombia) Juan Pablo Montoya					10	6^{18}												93
25	(Mexico) Esteban Gutiérrez R							19	14		17	13	14	20	22				91
26	(Colombia) Sebastián Saavedra						15^{31}						11		21	11			80
27	(Spain) Oriol Servià						21^{12}	20	19										61
28	(United Kingdom) Jack Harvey R						31^{27}										14	18	57
29	(Spain) Fernando Alonso R						24^{5}												47
30	(United Kingdom) Pippa Mann						17^{28}												32
31	(Canada) Zachary Claman DeMelo R																	17	26
32	(United Kingdom) Jay Howard						33^{20}												24
33	(United States) Zach Veach R			19			26^{32}												23
34	(United States) Sage Karam						28^{21}												23
35	(Australia) James Davison R						20^{33}												21
36	(France) Tristan Vautier									16									15
37	(United States) Buddy Lazier						29^{30}												14
Pos	Driver	STP	LBH	BAR	PHX	IMS	INDY	BEL		TMS	ROA	IOW	TOR	MOH	POC	GTW	WGL	SON	Pts

Color	Result
Gold	Winner
Silver	2nd place
Bronze	3rd place
Green	4th & 5th place
Light Blue	6th–10th place
Dark Blue	Finished (Outside Top 10)
Purple	Did not finish
Red	Did not qualify (DNQ)
Brown	Withdrawn (Wth)
Black	Disqualified (DSQ)
White	Did Not Start (DNS)
White	Race abandoned (C)
Blank	Did not participate

**In-line notation**
**Bold**	Pole position (1 point; except Indy)
Italics	Ran fastest race lap
*	Led most race laps (2 points)
DNS	Any driver who qualifies but does not start (DNS), earns half the points had they taken part.
^{1–33}	Indy 500 qualifying results, with points as follows: 42 points for 1st 40 points for 2nd and so on down to 1 point for 33rd.
^{c}	Qualifying canceled no bonus point awarded
RY	Rookie of the Year
R	Rookie

=== Entrant standings ===
- Based on the entrant, used for oval qualifications order, and starting grids when qualifying is cancelled.
- Only full-time entrants, and at-large part-time entrants shown.

Pos	Driver	STP	LBH	BAR	PHX	IMS	INDY	BEL		TMS	ROA	IOW	TOR	MOH	POC	GTW	WGL	SON	Pts
1	#2 Team Penske	8	3	1	9	11	19^{22}	4	2	13	2	6	1*	1*	2	1*	18	**2**	642
2	#1 Team Penske	2	5	3	1*	4	14^{23}	16	5	3	4	7	**5**	4	4	3	9	1*	629
3	#9 Chip Ganassi Racing	3	4*	2	5	2	**32**^{1}	2	6	9	1*	8	10	9	6*	2	2	4	621
4	#3 Team Penske	6	**9**	4	**4**	5	2^{19}	7	9	20	**3**	1*	8	7	7	4	4	5	598
5	#12 Team Penske	**19**	13	**14***	2	**1***	23^{9}	18	3	1*	5	**4**	21	**2**	1	**20**	6	3	562
6	#15 Rahal Letterman Lanigan Racing	17	10	13	21	6	12^{14}	**1***	1*	4	8	5	9	3	9	12	5	6	522
7	#98 Andretti Herta Autosport with Curb-Agajanian	11	19	5	15	8	7^{3}	5	7	22	13	11	2	6	3	6	**1***	21	494
8	#26 Andretti Autosport	5	18	9	16	12	1^{4}	8	**4**	10	19	16	16	5	**13**	19	19	20	441
9	#28 Andretti Autosport	4	17	11	13	3	27^{10}	13	17	19	14	3	6	8	8	15	3	8	421
10	#10 Chip Ganassi Racing	12	15	7	6	20	5^{7}	15	10	2	21	9	19	16	5	16	20	16	403
11	#8 Chip Ganassi Racing	16	14	12	20	7	4*^{15}	11	15	8	9	14	7	15	18	17	8	12	396
12	#27 Andretti Autosport with Yorrow	7	20	21	18	16	8^{8}	12	13	6	18	17	4	12	11	14	16	7	388
13	#5 Schmidt Peterson Motorsports	9	1	6	12	13	22^{17}	3	20	14	20	10	3	11	20	8	21	22	376
14	#21 Ed Carpenter Racing	13	11	19	3	14	16^{6}	17	18	12	16	2	13	17	19	18	15	14	358
15	#20 Ed Carpenter Racing	20	8	20	7	9	11^{2}	10	21	11	12	12	18	19	12	21	12	13	358
16	#19 Dale Coyne Racing	10	6	16	11	19	3^{11}	9	22	17	7	18	20	21	17	13	13	19	354
17	#18 Dale Coyne Racing	1*	2	8	19	22	20^{33}	19	14	16	17	13	14	20	22	10	17	9	341
18	#14 A. J. Foyt Enterprises	21	7	17	10	15	10^{24}	14	11	18	11	20	15	18	10	9	10	15	328
19	#83 Chip Ganassi Racing	18	21	15	8	21	25^{16}	21	8	**21**	6	15	12	13	16	7	7	11	327
20	#7 Schmidt Peterson Motorsports	14	12	10	17	18	13^{13}	6	16	15	10	21	11	14	21	11	14	18	324
21	#4 A. J. Foyt Enterprises	15	16	18	14	17	30^{26}	22	12	7	15	19	17	10	14	5	11	10	305
Pos	Driver	STP	LBH	BAR	PHX	IMS	INDY	BEL		TMS	ROA	IOW	TOR	MOH	POC	GTW	WGL	SON	Pts

=== Manufacturer standings ===
Pos	Manufacturer	STP	LBH	BAR	PHX	IMS	INDY	BEL		TMS	ROA	IOW	TOR	MOH	POC	GTW	WGL	SON	Bonus	Points
1	Chevrolet	2	3	1	1	1	2	4	2	1	2	1	1	1	1	1	4	1	70	1489
1	Chevrolet	6	5	3	2	4	10	7	3	3	3	2	5	2	2	3	6	2	70	1489
1	Chevrolet	**69**	**66**	**91***	**96***	**88***	61	58	75	90*	**76**	**96***	**86***	**96***	95	**91***	60	**186***	70	1489
2	Honda	1	1	2	5	2	1	1	1	2	1	3	2	3	3	2	1	4	85	1326
2	Honda	3	2	5	6	3	3	2	4	4	6	5	3	5	5	6	2	6	85	1326
2	Honda	90*	95*	70	58	75	**92***	**96***	**88***	**73**	83*	65	75	65	**66***	68	**96***	120	85	1326

- All manufacturer points (including qualifying points, race finish points, and race win bonus points) can only be earned by full-season entrants.
- The top two finishing entrants from each manufacturer in each race score championship points for their respective manufacturer. The manufacturer that wins each race will be awarded five additional points.
- At all races except the Indy 500, the manufacturer who qualifies on pole earns one point. At the Indy 500, the fastest Saturday qualifier earns one point, while the pole position winner on Sunday earns two points.
- For every full-season engine used during the Indy 500 that reaches 2,000 total miles run, the manufacturer earns bonus points equal to that engine's finishing position in the race.
- Ties are broken by number of wins, followed by number of 2nds, 3rds, etc.
