= 2017 Iowa Corn 300 =

(United States) 2017 Iowa Corn 300
Race details
11th round of the 2017 IndyCar Series season
← Previous race	Next race →
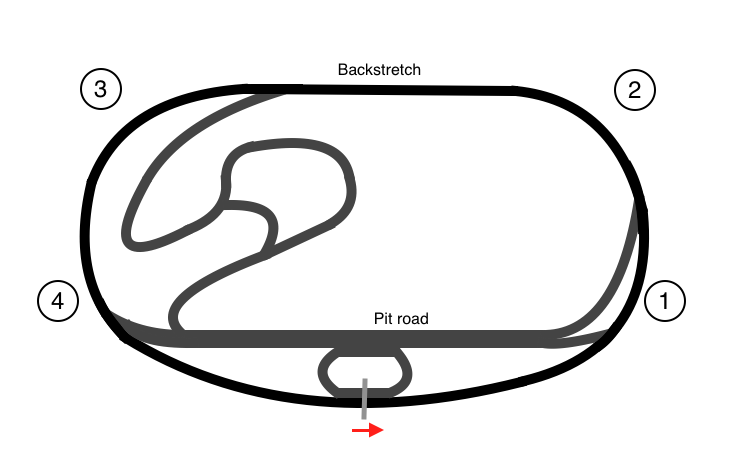
- Date: July 9, 2017
- Official name: Iowa Corn 300
- Location: Iowa Speedway
- Course: Permanent racing facility 0.875 mi / 1.400 km
- Distance: 300 laps 268.2 mi / 431.63 km

Pole position
- Driver: (Australia) Will Power (Team Penske)
- Time: 17.3929 + 17.3612 = 34.7541

Fastest lap
- Driver: (Brazil) Hélio Castroneves (Team Penske)
- Time: 18.1486 (on lap 144 of 300)

Podium
- First: (Brazil) Hélio Castroneves (Team Penske)
- Second: (United States) J. R. Hildebrand (Ed Carpenter Racing)
- Third: (United States) Ryan Hunter-Reay (Andretti Autosport)

The 2017 Iowa Corn 300 was an IndyCar Series event held at Iowa Speedway in Newton, Iowa on July 9, 2017. The event served as the 11th round of the 2017 IndyCar Series season. Will Power qualified on pole, while Hélio Castroneves snapped a three-year winless streak by taking victory.

== Qualifying ==
Qualifying was held on Saturday, July 8. Will Power took pole position with a two-lap time of 34.7541 (185.210 mph). Beside him on the front row was J. R. Hildebrand, who secured his first career front-row start. Rounding out the top five were Hélio Castroneves, Ed Carpenter, and Takuma Sato. Carlos Muñoz crashed during his qualifying attempt, relegating him to starting last. It was the third time in the last four events that Muñoz had registered no time in qualifying.

== Race ==
The race was held on Sunday, July 9. At the start, Will Power swept into the lead, while both Hélio Castroneves and Ed Carpenter passed J. R. Hildebrand for second and third, respectively. Takuma Sato rounded out the top five. On lap 20, Castroneves moved past his teammate Power for the lead and began puling away. Further back, Graham Rahal began a move through the field to third place, while Mikhail Aleshin moved up to fourth. Aleshin's run would come to an early end on lap 57, as he lost control of his car, spun, and crashed into the outside wall in turn two, bringing out the race's first caution period. During the caution, the field made their first pit stops, with Castroneves emerging still in the lead, with Power, Rahal, Carpenter, and Hildebrand behind.

Racing resumed on lap 67 with the leaders remaining in order. However, positions second through sixth battled after the restart, eventually resulting in Hildebrand moving up to second place on lap 93. Four laps later, Hildebrand caught and passed Castroneves for the lead of the race and began to pull away. Behind them, Ryan Hunter-Reay was able to move around Carpenter to move into the top 5. On lap 100, Castroneves dropped to third behind his teammate Power. By lap 109, the running order was Hildebrand, Power, Castroneves, Rahal, Hunter-Reay, and Josef Newgarden, who had moved ahead of Carpenter.

On lap 132, the race saw its second caution period when Carlos Muñoz hit the wall coming out of turn 4, bringing an end to his race. The caution period saw the race's second round of pit stops, during which Castroneves managed to leapfrog both Hildebrand and Power to reclaim the lead of the race, while Hunter-Reay moved into fourth ahead of Rahal. The race restarted on lap 142, with Power immediately passing Hildebrand for second and Rahal passing Hunter-Reay for fourth. After a few laps, though, Hildebrand once again passed Power and began to close on Castroneves. His charge was stopped when the race's third caution period waved as Conor Daly made contact with the front straight wall on lap 171. With the caution came another round of stops, with Castroneves emerging in front of Power, Hunter-Reay, and Hildebrand. The race lead belonged to Charlie Kimball, who had elected not to pit during this caution period.

Racing resumed again on lap 182, with Castroneves taking less than a lap to reclaim the lead, while behind, Rahal was able to get around Hildebrand. The leaders were able to quickly dispatch of Kimball and continue their pursuit of Castroneves. On lap 196, caution once again waved, this time for a passing rain shower. Most of the leaders stayed out, while a few drivers farther back in the field, including Newgarden, Scott Dixon, and Simon Pagenaud, elected to pit. On lap 208, the race was halted as the rain grew heavier, though only lasted for roughly 10 minutes.

Racing finally resumed on lap 210 with Castroneves in the lead, while Newgarden, on new tires, moved into the top six after only nine laps. Castroneves, though, managed to pull out a sizable lead before making his final pit stop on lap 253. However, after the cycle of stops, Hildebrand emerged ahead of Castroneves, having stopped for fresh tires seven laps before Castroneves. Castroneves quickly caught back up to Hildebrand and managed to move back in front after using a slower back-marker as a pick. Castroneves pulled away and lead the remainder of the race to take victory.

Castroneves's victory snapped a 54 race winless drought going back the 2014 Dual in Detroit. It also marked his 30th career victory in IndyCars. Hildebrand's second place matched his career best finish. Hunter-Reay rounded out the podium with a third-place finish. Rahal and Power finished out the top five. In the championship, Dixon maintained his lead in the points, but now stood only eight points in front of Castroneves. Pagenaud, Power, and Newgarden ran third through fifth in the points.

== Report ==
Key	Meaning
R	Rookie
W	Past winner

=== Qualifying ===
Pos	No.	Name	Lap 1	Lap 2	Total Time	Avg. Speed (mph)
1	12	(Australia) Will Power	17.3929	17.3612	34.7541	185.210
2	21	(United States) J. R. Hildebrand	17.4635	17.5550	35.0185	183.811
3	3	(Brazil) Hélio Castroneves	17.4323	17.6051	35.0374	183.712
4	20	(United States) Ed Carpenter	17.5087	17.5687	35.0774	183.503
5	26	(Japan) Takuma Sato	17.6313	17.6092	35.2405	182.653
6	7	(Russia) Mikhail Aleshin	17.6951	17.5840	35.2791	182.454
7	10	(Brazil) Tony Kanaan W	17.6533	17.6373	35.2906	182.394
8	19	(United Arab Emirates) Ed Jones R	17.6351	17.6756	35.3107	182.290
9	5	(Canada) James Hinchcliffe W	17.7812	17.7445	35.5257	181.187
10	15	(United States) Graham Rahal	17.8306	17.7047	35.5353	181.138
11	1	(France) Simon Pagenaud	17.7926	17.7429	35.5355	181.137
12	98	(United States) Alexander Rossi	17.7679	17.7678	35.5357	181.136
13	8	(United Kingdom) Max Chilton	17.7927	17.7841	35.5768	180.927
14	83	(United States) Charlie Kimball	17.8763	17.7130	35.5893	180.863
15	28	(United States) Ryan Hunter-Reay W	17.8020	17.8163	35.6183	180.716
16	2	(United States) Josef Newgarden W	17.8017	17.8903	35.6920	180.343
17	9	(New Zealand) Scott Dixon	17.8168	17.8834	35.7002	180.302
18	18	(Mexico) Esteban Gutiérrez R	18.0032	17.8785	35.8817	179.389
19	4	(United States) Conor Daly	18.0040	18.0336	36.0376	178.613
20	27	(United States) Marco Andretti W	18.4225	19.0640	37.4865	171.710
21	14	(Colombia) Carlos Muñoz	-	-	No Time	No Speed
OFFICIAL BOX SCORE

=== Race ===
Pos	No.	Driver	Team	Engine	Laps	Time/Retired	Pit Stops	Grid	Laps Led	Pts.^{1}
1	3	(Brazil) Hélio Castroneves	Team Penske	Chevrolet	300	1:55:11.2807	4	3	217	53
2	21	(United States) J. R. Hildebrand	Ed Carpenter Racing	Chevrolet	300	+3.9647	4	2	38	41
3	28	(United States) Ryan Hunter-Reay W	Andretti Autosport	Honda	300	+4.5845	4	15		35
4	12	(Australia) Will Power	Team Penske	Chevrolet	300	+5.7403	4	1	23	34
5	15	(United States) Graham Rahal	Rahal Letterman Lanigan Racing	Honda	300	+10.1811	4	10		30
6	2	(United States) Josef Newgarden W	Team Penske	Chevrolet	300	+11.0500	5	16	1	29
7	1	(France) Simon Pagenaud	Team Penske	Chevrolet	300	+12.2562	5	11	2	27
8	9	(New Zealand) Scott Dixon	Chip Ganassi Racing	Honda	300	+14.3653	5	17		24
9	10	(Brazil) Tony Kanaan W	Chip Ganassi Racing	Honda	300	+15.1184	4	7		22
10	5	(Canada) James Hinchcliffe W	Schmidt Peterson Motorsports	Honda	300	+15.8243	4	9		20
11	98	(United States) Alexander Rossi	Andretti Herta Autosport	Honda	299	+1 Lap	4	12		19
12	20	(United States) Ed Carpenter	Ed Carpenter Racing	Chevrolet	299	+1 Lap	4	4		18
13	18	(Mexico) Esteban Gutiérrez R	Dale Coyne Racing	Honda	299	+1 Lap	4	18		17
14	8	(United Kingdom) Max Chilton	Chip Ganassi Racing	Honda	299	+1 Lap	4	13	2	17
15	83	(United States) Charlie Kimball	Chip Ganassi Racing	Honda	298	+2 Laps	4	14	10	16
16	26	(Japan) Takuma Sato	Andretti Autosport	Honda	298	+2 Laps	5	5		14
17	27	(United States) Marco Andretti W	Andretti Autosport	Honda	298	+2 Laps	5	20	7	14
18	19	(United Arab Emirates) Ed Jones R	Dale Coyne Racing	Honda	297	+3 Laps	5	8		12
19	4	(United States) Conor Daly	A. J. Foyt Enterprises	Chevrolet	168	Contact	5	19		11
20	14	(Colombia) Carlos Muñoz	A. J. Foyt Enterprises	Chevrolet	130	Contact	3	21		10
21	7	(Russia) Mikhail Aleshin	Schmidt Peterson Motorsports	Honda	56	Contact	0	6		9
OFFICIAL BOX SCORE

^{1} Points include 1 point for leading at least 1 lap during a race, an additional 2 points for leading the most race laps, and 1 point for Pole Position.

Source for time gaps:

== Championship standings ==
Driver standings

	Pos	Driver	Points
	1	(New Zealand) Scott Dixon	403
1	2	(Brazil) Hélio Castroneves	395
1	3	(France) Simon Pagenaud	372
2	4	(Australia) Will Power	350
	5	(United States) Josef Newgarden	347

Manufacturer standings

Pos	Manufacturer	Points
1	(Japan) Honda	885
2	(United States) Chevrolet	866

- Note: Only the top five positions are included.

Previous race: 2017 Kohler Grand Prix	IndyCar Series; 2017 season	Next race: 2017 Honda Indy Toronto
Previous race: 2016 Iowa Corn 300	Iowa Corn 300	Next race: 2018 Iowa Corn 300
