= 2017 Bommarito Automotive Group 500 =

(United States) 2017 Gateway
Race details
15th round of the 2017 IndyCar Series season
← Previous race	Next race →
- Date: August 26, 2017
- Official name: Bommarito Automotive Group 500 Presented by Valvoline
- Location: Gateway Motorsports Park
- Course: Permanent racing facility 1.25 mi / 2.01 km
- Distance: 248 laps 310 mi / 499 km
- Weather: 72 °F (22 °C), clear skies

Pole position
- Driver: (Australia) Will Power (Team Penske)
- Time: 23.7206 + 23.7373 = 47.4579

Fastest lap
- Driver: (United States) Josef Newgarden (Team Penske)
- Time: 24.6317 (on lap 217 of 248)

Podium
- First: (United States) Josef Newgarden (Team Penske)
- Second: (New Zealand) Scott Dixon (Chip Ganassi Racing)
- Third: (France) Simon Pagenaud (Team Penske)

The 2017 Bommarito Automotive Group 500 was the 15th round of the 2017 IndyCar Series season. The race was held on August 26, 2017, at Gateway Motorsports Park in Madison, Illinois, just east of St. Louis, Missouri. Will Power qualified on pole for the race, while Josef Newgarden won the race after gaining the lead on lap 217.

== Background ==
On August 25, 2016, the IndyCar Series announced a multi-year deal with Gateway Motorsports Park—with the inaugural race scheduled for August 26, 2017. IndyCar's return to Gateway Motorsports Park marked the first premier-level open-wheel race in the Greater St. Louis area since 2003.

In July 2017, the entire racetrack was resurfaced as part of an effort by the track to update and upgrade the venue. Both IndyCar and NASCAR supported the repaving project. Other major upgrades to the venue included new catch fences, paving part of the inside track, and expanding the SAFER barrier.

The race saw the return of Sébastien Bourdais, who had not raced since fracturing his hip and pelvis in a violent crash during Indianapolis 500 qualifying.

== Qualifying ==
Qualifying was held on Friday, August 25. Will Power qualified on pole position with a two lap time of 47.4579 (189.642).

== Race ==
The newly repaved track surface, which had impressed drivers during testing, quickly became a source of concern after multiple incidents at the beginning of the race. Tony Kanaan's car spun on the pace lap and made contact with the SAFER barrier in turn 2. Kanaan was eventually able to re-enter the race three laps down, though his crash delayed the start of the race until lap 5. When the remaining field took the green flag, polesitter Will Power spun on the first green-flag lap of the race. The spin caused Power's car to hit the wall in turn 2. As Takuma Sato and Ed Carpenter attempted to avoid Power, the two cars made contact with each other. Both drivers subsequently contacted the wall, causing all three drivers to retire from the race.

Josef Newgarden passed Will Power for the lead on the outside of turn 1 immediately prior to Power's spin-out. Newgarden maintained the lead until pitting on lap 60. Sébastien Bourdais then led the race for the next 5 laps until he was forced to pit as well. Max Chilton became the race leader for a single lap before also making a pit stop. As both Bourdais and Chilton were on alternate pit strategies, Newgarden remained the effective leader of the race.

After Chilton's pit stop on lap 66, Newgarden officially regained the lead on lap 67. The third caution of the race came out when J. R. Hildebrand crashed into turn 4 on lap 102. During the caution period, all of the race leaders pitted. Hélio Castroneves beat Newgarden out of pit road to take the race lead.

The green flag came back out on lap 112. By lap 155, Castroneves had extended his lead to just over three seconds ahead of Newgarden. During a pit stop on lap 157, Castroneves stalled while exiting his pit box. Although his crew was able to restart his car almost immediately, the long stop dropped Castroneves from leading the race to fourth place. The incident also gave the race lead back to Newgarden.

The fourth caution occurred on lap 166 when Max Chilton spun into the outside wall of turn 4. During the caution, Chilton's teammate Tony Kanaan was called to the pit lane by team owner Chip Ganassi. Kanaan's car had been loose throughout the race, prompting Ganassi to park Kanaan's car for the remainder of the race. The decision was reminiscent of one from the previous race at Pocono, in which Ganassi parked Chilton's car.

The race returned to green flag conditions on lap 174. A notable incident occurred on lap 181 between Conor Daly and Charlie Kimball. Daly, running in eleventh place at the time, got a run on Kimball. As Daly began to pass Kimball on the inside of the track, Kimball abruptly swerved to his left. Daly was furious, as it appeared that Kimballs move was a clear attempt to block him. The incident was reviewed, but no action was taken against Kimball.

The fifth and final caution arose on lap 203 when Ryan Hunter-Reay entered turn 4 too high and brushed the SAFER barrier as he exited the turn. Simon Pagenaud gained the race lead over Josef Newgarden on lap 206 when both drivers made pit stops under caution.

Newgarden regained the lead on lap 217 after passing Pagenaud on the inside as the two entered turn 1. During the pass, the two cars' tires made slight contact, sending Pagenaud to the outside of the track. Although a crash was avoided, Pagenaud was forced to lift off the gas to avoid hitting the outside wall. Scott Dixon, who had been running in third, seized the opportunity and passed Pagenaud as well.

Shortly after retaking the lead, Newgarden pulled more than a second ahead of Dixon. Pagenaud held his position roughly a half-second behind Dixon. Newgarden held his position for the remainder of the race, clinching his fourth win of the season.

== Results ==
Key	Meaning
R	Rookie
W	Past winner

=== Qualifying ===
Pos	No.	Name	Lap 1 Time	Lap 2 Time	Total Time	Avg. Speed (mph)
1	12	(Australia) Will Power	23.7206	23.7373	00:47.5	189.642
2	2	(United States) Josef Newgarden	23.9311	23.861	00:47.8	188.316
3	3	(Brazil) Hélio Castroneves W	24.0149	23.9960	00:48.0	187.457
4	1	(France) Simon Pagenaud	24.153	24.0406	00:48.2	186.747
5	20	(United States) Ed Carpenter	24.3965	24.3766	00:48.8	184.528
6	26	(Japan) Takuma Sato	24.4513	24.4124	00:48.9	184.186
7	9	(New Zealand) Scott Dixon	24.4873	24.4663	00:49.0	183.848
8	14	(Colombia) Carlos Muñoz	24.5696	24.4448	00:49.0	183.620
9	98	(United States) Alexander Rossi	24.5769	24.4485	00:49.0	183.578
10	5	(Canada) James Hinchcliffe	24.5588	24.4801	00:49.0	183.528
11	4	(United States) Conor Daly	24.6002	24.5041	00:49.1	183.283
12	19	(United Arab Emirates) Ed Jones R	24.5747	24.6326	00:49.2	182.900
13	15	(United States) Graham Rahal	24.5780	24.6480	00:49.2	182.830
14	28	(United States) Ryan Hunter-Reay	24.7697	24.5376	00:49.3	182.529
15	21	(United States) J. R. Hildebrand	24.7475	24.5679	00:49.3	182.499
16	8	(United Kingdom) Max Chilton	24.7441	24.6328	00:49.4	182.271
17	10	(Brazil) Tony Kanaan	24.7556	24.6420	00:49.4	182.195
18	83	(United States) Charlie Kimball	24.7400	24.6733	00:49.4	182.137
19	18	(France) Sébastien Bourdais	24.8272	24.6652	00:49.5	181.846
20	27	(United States) Marco Andretti	24.8235	24.8478	00:49.7	181.191
21	7	(Colombia) Sebastián Saavedra	25.3628	25.2843	00:50.6	177.700
OFFICIAL BOX SCORE

Source for individual laps:

=== Race ===
Pos	No.	Driver	Team	Engine	Laps	Time/Retired	Pit Stops	Grid	Laps Led	Pts.^{1}
1	2	(United States) Josef Newgarden	Team Penske	Chevrolet	248	2:13:22.0358	4	2	170	53
2	9	(New Zealand) Scott Dixon	Chip Ganassi Racing	Honda	248	+0.6850	4	7	0	40
3	1	(France) Simon Pagenaud	Team Penske	Chevrolet	248	+0.9743	4	4	13	36
4	3	(Brazil) Hélio Castroneves W	Team Penske	Chevrolet	248	+1.5668	4	3	52	33
5	4	(United States) Conor Daly	A. J. Foyt Enterprises	Chevrolet	248	+1.7446	5	11	0	30
6	98	(United States) Alexander Rossi	Andretti Herta Autosport	Honda	248	+2.9101	4	9	0	28
7	83	(United States) Charlie Kimball	Chip Ganassi Racing	Honda	248	+4.2365	4	18	0	26
8	5	(Canada) James Hinchcliffe	Schmidt Peterson Motorsports	Honda	248	+4.8498	4	10	0	24
9	14	(Colombia) Carlos Muñoz	A. J. Foyt Enterprises	Chevrolet	248	+7.8832	5	8	0	22
10	18	(France) Sébastien Bourdais	Dale Coyne Racing	Honda	248	+8.1831	6	19	5	21
11	7	(Colombia) Sebastián Saavedra	Schmidt Peterson Motorsports	Honda	248	+8.6604	5	21	0	19
12	15	(United States) Graham Rahal	Rahal Letterman Lanigan Racing	Honda	248	+8.8457	4	13	0	18
13	19	(United Arab Emirates) Ed Jones R	Dale Coyne Racing	Honda	248	+12.3444	4	12	0	17
14	27	(United States) Marco Andretti	Andretti Autosport	Honda	248	+19.8702	7	20	0	16
15	28	(United States) Ryan Hunter-Reay	Andretti Autosport	Honda	205	Contact	4	14	0	15
16	10	(Brazil) Tony Kanaan	Chip Ganassi Racing	Honda	168	Mechanical	5	17	0	14
17	8	(United Kingdom) Max Chilton	Chip Ganassi Racing	Honda	164	Contact	4	16	3	14
18	21	(United States) J. R. Hildebrand	Ed Carpenter Racing	Chevrolet	100	Contact	1	15	0	12
19	26	(Japan) Takuma Sato	Andretti Autosport	Honda	6	Contact	0	6	0	11
20	12	(Australia) Will Power	Team Penske	Chevrolet	5	Contact	0	1	5	12
21	20	(United States) Ed Carpenter	Ed Carpenter Racing	Chevrolet	5	Contact	0	5	0	9
OFFICIAL BOX SCORE

Notes

^{1} Points include 1 point for leading at least 1 lap during a race, an additional 2 points for leading the most race laps, and 1 point for Pole Position.

Source for time gaps:

== Championship standings ==
Driver standings

Pos	Driver	Points
1	(United States) Josef Newgarden	547
2	(New Zealand) Scott Dixon	516
3	(Brazil) Hélio Castroneves	505
4	(France) Simon Pagenaud	504
5	(Australia) Will Power	464

Manufacturer standings

Pos	Manufacturer	Points
1	(United States) Chevrolet	1,293
2	(Japan) Honda	1,158

- Note: Only the top-five drivers in the standings are included.

Previous race: 2017 ABC Supply 500	IndyCar Series; 2017 season	Next race: 2017 IndyCar Grand Prix at The Glen
Previous race: 2003 Emerson Indy 250	Gateway Indy 250	Next race: 2018 Bommarito Automotive Group 500
