= 2016 Honda Indy Toronto =

(Canada) 2016 Toronto
Race details
11th round of the 2016 IndyCar Series season
| ← Previous race | Next race → |
- Date: July 17, 2016
- Official name: Honda Indy Toronto
- Location: Exhibition Place
- Course: Temporary road course 1.786 mi / 2.874 km
- Distance: 85 laps 151.81 mi / 244.314 km
- Weather: Temperatures reaching up to 26.1 °C (79.0 °F); with temperatures dropping to 20.6 °C (69.1 °F) by the end of the event

Pole position
- Driver: (New Zealand) Scott Dixon (Chip Ganassi)
- Time: 59.9073

Fastest lap
- Driver: (Brazil) Hélio Castroneves (Team Penske)
- Time: 1:00.8127 (on lap 80 of 85)

Podium
- First: (Australia) Will Power (Team Penske)
- Second: (Brazil) Hélio Castroneves (Team Penske)
- Third: (Canada) James Hinchcliffe (Schmidt Peterson Motorsports)

The 2016 Honda Indy Toronto was an open-wheel motorsport event held at Exhibition Place in Toronto, Ontario, Canada on the weekend of July 15–17, 2016. The event marked the 30th annual edition of the Toronto Indy, and the twelfth round of the 2016 Verizon IndyCar Series season. The race was the only event on the 2016 IndyCar season outside of the United States. The headline race was the 32nd IndyCar race to be held at the 1.755-mile (2.824 km) street circuit.

== Race background ==
The 2016 edition of the race moved back to its traditional mid-July date, after being held in June of 2015 to avoid conflicting with 2015 Pan American Games. The Exhibition Place circuit also featured changes to its layout, which represent the third modification to the layout since its inaugural race in 1986. Pitlane moved to the north side of the track, starting at Turn 9 and extending back onto Princes' Boulevard past Turn 11 before the start-finish line in order to accommodate the newly constructed Hotel X Toronto, opposite the Enercare Centre.

== Weekend support races ==
The NASCAR Pinty's Series was the Saturday headline race, with the series returning to the Toronto Indy for the first time since its 2010 and 2011 seasons. The weekend included races for the Indy Lights, Pro Mazda Championship, U.S. F2000 National Championship, Stadium Super Trucks and the IMSA GT3 Cup Challenge Canada.

== Race ==
Qualifying for the event took place on Saturday, July 16. Scott Dixon qualified on pole for the event with a time of 59.9073 at an average speed of 106 mph (170 km/h)- the slowest qualifying average speed of the year, and making only the second time on the 2016 season that a Team Penske driver had not started from first. It also marked Dixon's 24th pole position, tying him with Johnny Rutherford for 12th in all-time IndyCar poles. Penske cars, however, did take the next three positions, with Hélio Castroneves second, points leader Simon Pagenaud third, and Will Power fourth. Defending race winner Josef Newgarden qualified eighth.

The race began with Dixon jumping into the lead ahead of Castroneves and Pagenaud, while the rest of the field battled out behind them. The first lap was nearly completed cleanly, but in turn eight, Graham Rahal and Charlie Kimball made contact, sending Kimball into a spin and collecting Ryan Hunter-Reay, bringing out the day's first caution. All three drivers continued, but needed repairs for damage. The restart came on lap 5, where the lead order remained largely the same. Caution would wave again only one lap later, though, after Juan Pablo Montoya clipped the rear bumper-pod on Josef Newgarden's car, ripping the pod off and causing it to land on track between turns two and three. Newgarden was forced to pit to repair the damage, sending him to the back of the running order. The race restarted again on lap nine, and the race finally was allowed to get going. Dixon and Castroneves were able to pull out from their competitors behind, but on lap 25, the left front tire on Castroneves's car went flat, forcing him to pit and dropping him well down the order. This, in turn, allowed Dixon to hold a commanding lead.

The field was bunched up again for the third caution of the day on lap 45, when IndyCar officials were forced to do a track inspection in turn five after reports of the curbing be torn up and thrown across the race track. During this caution, some drivers, including James Hinchcliffe and Conor Daly, elected to go on an alternate strategy by pitting. The race restarted on lap 51, with Dixon and Pagenaud in the lead. Shortly after the restart, green flag pit stops began. This proved to be the pivotal moment of the race. On lap 58, Josef Newgarden, who was experiencing high fatigue in his right hand due to his injury from the Firestone 600 plus the bumps of the Toronto Circuit, crashed in turn five. The pit lane closed due to incident, but Will Power had been able to just make it into the pits before they were closed, giving him a huge advantage of Dixon and Pagenaud, who had not yet stopped. As those who had not stopped yet stopped pitted, Tony Kanaan, who was on an alternate strategy, inherited the lead.

The race restarted on lap 64. Kanaan pulled away from Power, but with a pit stop still ahead for him, Power was set for the lead. Kanaan finally pitted on lap 76, officially giving the lead to Power. Hélio Castroneves, meanwhile, had managed to recover from his early race puncture and moved into second place after passing James Hinchcliffe and Kanaan on the same lap. However, he appeared not to have enough time to be able to catch his teammate Power. That changed on lap 81, however, when Jack Hawksworth crashed into the wall in turn five. Shortly after his impact, Juan Pablo Montoya joined him in the same barrier. Montoya was able to continue on, but the damage to Hawksworth's car too much. This brought out the race's fifth caution. By the time Hawksworth's car was removed from turn five, only one lap of racing would remain at the restart. In a situation similar to the Kohler Grand Prix, Power was able to pull away easily from Castroneves using his saved push to passes. By the end of the final lap, Power had pulled out 1.5 seconds over his teammate to take victory. For Power, the victory was his third win in the last four races and moved him into second place in the championship standings, marking him the biggest threat to his teammate Simon Pagenaud's point lead. Hometown favorite James Hinchcliffe was able to hold on for a third-place finish due to his alternate pit strategy and the late race caution period. Scott Dixon, who had been so dominant until the ill-timed caution, was only able to recover to eighth, while Pagenaud finished directly behind him in ninth. Rookie drivers struggled heavily in the race, with Conor Daly's 15th place being the highest of all rookies in the race.

== Results ==
| Key | Meaning |
|---|---|
| R | Rookie |
| W | Past winner |

=== Qualifying ===
| Pos | No. | Name | Grp. | Round 1 | Round 2 | Round 3 |
|---|---|---|---|---|---|---|
| 1 | 9 | (New Zealand) Scott Dixon W | 2 | 1:00.1866 | 1:00.0143 | 59.9073 |
| 2 | 3 | (Brazil) Hélio Castroneves | 1 | 1:00.4910 | 59.8562 | 59.9425 |
| 3 | 22 | (France) Simon Pagenaud | 1 | 1:00.2386 | 1:00.0299 | 1:00.2293 |
| 4 | 12 | (Australia) Will Power W | 2 | 59.7747 | 1:00.0065 | 1:00.4085 |
| 5 | 11 | (France) Sébastien Bourdais W | 2 | 1:00.1466 | 1:00.1971 | 1:00.4221 |
| 6 | 5 | (Canada) James Hinchcliffe | 1 | 1:00.6291 | 1:00.4584 | 1:01.5637 |
| 7 | 18 | (United States) Conor Daly R | 1 | 1:00.4913 | 1:00.5693 | |
| 8 | 21 | (United States) Josef Newgarden W | 2 | 1:00.3688 | 1:00.5885 | |
| 9 | 2 | (Colombia) Juan Pablo Montoya | 2 | 59.9964 | 1:00.6532 | |
| 10 | 7 | (Russia) Mikhail Aleshin | 2 | 1:00.5384 | 1:00.6635 | |
| 11 | 19 | (Italy) Luca Filippi | 1 | 1:00.5552 | 1:00.7784 | |
| 12 | 10 | (Brazil) Tony Kanaan | 1 | 1:00.5297 | 1:00.8561 | |
| 13 | 41 | (United Kingdom) Jack Hawksworth | 1 | 1:00.6930 | | |
| 14 | 8 | (United Kingdom) Max Chilton R | 2 | 1:00.6372 | | |
| 15 | 26 | (Colombia) Carlos Muñoz | 1 | 1:00.7712 | | |
| 16 | 15 | (United States) Graham Rahal | 2 | 1:00.7088 | | |
| 17 | 83 | (United States) Charlie Kimball | 1 | 1:00.9060 | | |
| 18 | 28 | (United States) Ryan Hunter-Reay W | 2 | 1:00.8721 | | |
| 19 | 98 | (United States) Alexander Rossi R | 1 | 1:01.2087 | | |
| 20 | 14 | (Japan) Takuma Sato | 2 | 1:01.4012 | | |
| 21 | 20 | (United States) Spencer Pigot R | 1 | 1:01.3360 | | |
| 22 | 27 | (United States) Marco Andretti | 2 | 1:01.4384 | | |
OFFICIAL BOX SCORE

Source for individual rounds

=== Race results ===
| Pos | No. | Driver | Team | Engine | Laps | Time/Retired | Pit Stops | Grid | Laps Led | Pts.^{1} |
|---|---|---|---|---|---|---|---|---|---|---|
| 1 | 12 | (Australia) Will Power W | Team Penske | Chevrolet | 85 | 1:42:38.6925 | 2 | 4 | 10 | 51 |
| 2 | 3 | (Brazil) Hélio Castroneves | Team Penske | Chevrolet | 85 | +1.5275 | 2 | 2 | | 40 |
| 3 | 5 | (Canada) James Hinchcliffe | Schmidt Peterson Motorsports | Honda | 85 | +2.5303 | 2 | 6 | | 35 |
| 4 | 10 | (Brazil) Tony Kanaan | Chip Ganassi Racing | Chevrolet | 85 | +3.7758 | 3 | 12 | 16 | 33 |
| 5 | 14 | (Japan) Takuma Sato | A. J. Foyt Enterprises | Honda | 85 | +4.0568 | 2 | 20 | | 30 |
| 6 | 7 | (Russia) Mikhail Aleshin | Schmidt Peterson Motorsports | Honda | 85 | +5.1145 | 2 | 10 | | 28 |
| 7 | 11 | (France) Sébastien Bourdais W | KVSH Racing | Chevrolet | 85 | +5.6393 | 2 | 5 | 1 | 27 |
| 8 | 9 | (New Zealand) Scott Dixon W | Chip Ganassi Racing | Chevrolet | 85 | +6.1020 | 2 | 1 | 56 | 28 |
| 9 | 22 | (France) Simon Pagenaud | Team Penske | Chevrolet | 85 | +6.6355 | 2 | 3 | 1 | 23 |
| 10 | 27 | (United States) Marco Andretti | Andretti Autosport | Honda | 85 | +6.9746 | 2 | 22 | | 20 |
| 11 | 83 | (United States) Charlie Kimball | Chip Ganassi Racing | Chevrolet | 85 | +7.4782 | 4 | 17 | | 19 |
| 12 | 28 | (United States) Ryan Hunter-Reay W | Andretti Autosport | Honda | 85 | +8.0690 | 5 | 18 | | 18 |
| 13 | 15 | (United States) Graham Rahal | Rahal Letterman Lanigan Racing | Honda | 85 | +8.5989 | 5 | 16 | | 17 |
| 14 | 19 | (Italy) Luca Filippi | Dale Coyne Racing | Honda | 85 | +8.9217 | 2 | 11 | | 16 |
| 15 | 18 | (United States) Conor Daly R | Dale Coyne Racing | Honda | 85 | +9.4068 | 3 | 7 | 1 | 16 |
| 16 | 98 | (United States) Alexander Rossi R | Andretti Herta Autosport | Honda | 85 | +9.6896 | 2 | 19 | | 14 |
| 17 | 26 | (Colombia) Carlos Muñoz | Andretti Autosport | Honda | 85 | +10.0568 | 3 | 15 | | 13 |
| 18 | 8 | (United Kingdom) Max Chilton R | Chip Ganassi Racing | Chevrolet | 85 | +10.6502 | 4 | 14 | | 12 |
| 19 | 20 | (United States) Spencer Pigot R | Ed Carpenter Racing | Chevrolet | 85 | +11.4494 | 3 | 21 | | 11 |
| 20 | 2 | (Colombia) Juan Pablo Montoya | Team Penske | Chevrolet | 84 | +1 Lap | 3 | 9 | | 10 |
| 21 | 41 | (United Kingdom) Jack Hawksworth | A. J. Foyt Enterprises | Honda | 80 | Contact | 2 | 13 | | 9 |
| 22 | 21 | (United States) Josef Newgarden W | Ed Carpenter Racing | Chevrolet | 57 | Contact | 3 | 8 | | 8 |
OFFICIAL BOX SCORE

Notes

^{1} Points include 1 point for leading at least 1 lap during a race, an additional 2 points for leading the most race laps, and 1 point for Pole Position.

Source for time gaps:

== Championship standings after the race ==
Drivers' Championship standings

| | Pos | Driver | Points |
| | 1 | (France) Simon Pagenaud | 432 |
| 1 | 2 | (Australia) Will Power | 385 |
| 2 | 3 | (Brazil) Hélio Castroneves | 358 |
| | 4 | (New Zealand) Scott Dixon | 349 |
| 3 | 5 | (United States) Josef Newgarden | 344 |

- Note: Only the top five positions are included.

== Media ==
=== Television ===
The race was broadcast live by CNBC in the United States and by Sportsnet on Sportsnet 360 in Canada.

IndyCar Series on NBC
| Booth Announcers | | Pit reporters |
|---|---|---|
| Announcer | Leigh Diffey | Jon Beekhuis; Robin Miller; Kevin Lee; Katie Hargitt |
| Color | Townsend Bell; Paul Tracy | Jon Beekhuis; Robin Miller; Kevin Lee; Katie Hargitt |

=== Radio ===
The race was broadcast on radio by the IMS Radio Network and simulcast on Sirius / XM satellite radio and Indycar.com.

| Previous race: 2016 Iowa Corn 300 | IndyCar Series; 2016 season | Next race: 2016 Honda Indy 200 |
| Previous race: 2015 Honda Indy Toronto | Honda Indy Toronto | Next race: 2017 Honda Indy Toronto |
