= 2016 Iowa Corn 300 =

(United States) 2016 Iowa Corn 300
Race details
10th round of the 2016 IndyCar Series season
← Previous race	Next race →
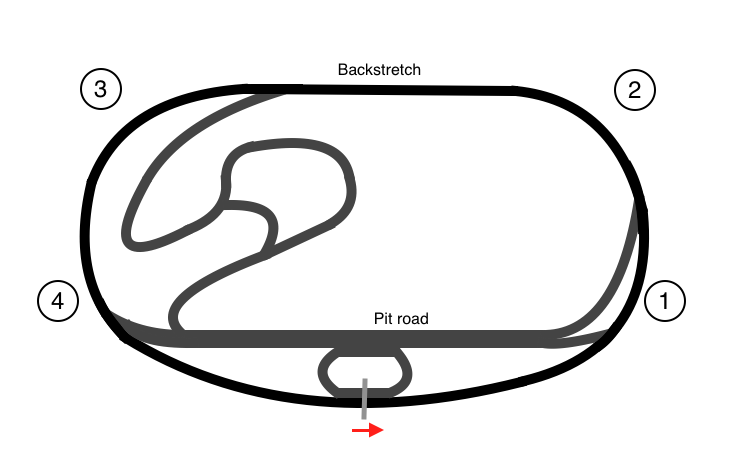
- Date: July 10, 2016
- Official name: Iowa Corn 300
- Location: Iowa Speedway
- Course: Permanent racing facility 0.875 mi / 1.400 km
- Distance: 300 laps 268.2 mi / 431.63 km

Pole position
- Driver: (France) Simon Pagenaud (Team Penske)
- Time: 34.6334

Fastest lap
- Driver: (United States) Josef Newgarden (Ed Carpenter Racing)
- Time: 17.9317 (on lap 265 of 300)

Podium
- First: (United States) Josef Newgarden (Ed Carpenter Racing)
- Second: (Australia) Will Power (Team Penske)
- Third: (New Zealand) Scott Dixon (Chip Ganassi Racing)

The 2016 Iowa Corn 300 was the 10th Round of the 2016 Verizon IndyCar Series season and the 10th consecutive year the Verizon IndyCar Series visited the Newton, Iowa short oval. The race was broadcast on NBCSN with Brian Till as the Lap-By-Lap Announcer. Ryan Hunter-Reay of Andretti Autosport entered as the defending winner of the race.

== Race Summary ==
The race was moved to a Sunday afternoon due to the Saturday Night slot on NBCSN taken up by the Quaker State 400 of the 2016 NASCAR Sprint Cup Series. Qualifying saw Simon Pagenaud take his fifth pole of the season while also giving Team Penske its 500th pole position across all series. Ryan Hunter-Reay started 20th, and would have to climb through the field to repeat his victory. The race started on schedule with Josef Newgarden taking the lead from Pagenaud and leading the first 50 laps. As pit stops began to cycle through, the lead would shuffle to Pagenaud, then to Max Chilton, and then Alexander Rossi, before Newgarden returned to the lead. The race saw its first yellow flag when defending winner Ryan Hunter-Reay suffered an engine failure on lap 108 and came to a halt on track. The caution flag ended Newgarden's chance to lap the field, as many previously lapped cars were waved around to the tail end of the lead lap. The race restarted on lap 128, where Newgarden once again began to pull away from the field. Caution flew once more on lap 179, when Juan Pablo Montoya suffered an engine failure and, like Hunter-Reay, came to a stop on course. The race returned to green flag racing on lap 188. The third and final caution came for a spin by Max Chilton in turn 2 on lap 246, which bunched the field up for a 40 lap sprint to the end. Newgarden, however, was still untouchable and cruised away to win by over four seconds over Will Power, despite suffering a broken wrist the previous weekend at Texas Motor Speedway. Only five cars remained on the lead lap by the time the checkered flag fell.

Newgarden's 282 laps led set a record for most laps led in a Verizon IndyCar Series race. His victory also moved him up to second place in the championship, making him a serious contender to take victory. Chevrolet was dominant again, as they had been for much of the season, with the top four positions all going to Chevrolet powered cars. Mikhail Aleshin's fifth-place finish made him the highest placed Honda driver. Alexander Rossi was the highest placed rookie in the field, coming in sixth. It was his best finish since his Indianapolis 500 victory. Only three drivers retired during the race; Juan Pablo Montoya, Conor Daly, and Ryan Hunter-Reay, all with engine related issues.

== Results ==
Key	Meaning
R	Rookie
W	Past winner

=== Qualifying ===
Pos	No.	Name	Lap 1 Time	Lap 2 Time	Total Time	Avg. Speed (mph)
1	22	(France) Simon Pagenaud	17.3089	17.3245	34.6334	185.855
2	21	(United States) Josef Newgarden	17.3314	17.3424	34.6738	185.639
3	3	(Brazil) Hélio Castroneves	17.3605	17.3517	34.7122	185.433
4	8	(United Kingdom) Max Chilton R	17.3768	17.3380	34.7148	185.419
5	83	(United States) Charlie Kimball	17.4438	17.4461	34.8899	184.489
6	10	(Brazil) Tony Kanaan W	17.4720	17.4291	34.9011	184.430
7	20	(United States) Ed Carpenter	17.4501	17.4681	34.9182	184.339
8	12	(Australia) Will Power	17.5366	17.4490	34.9856	183.984
9	7	(Russia) Mikhail Aleshin	17.6076	17.6135	35.2211	182.754
10	9	(New Zealand) Scott Dixon	17.6701	17.5716	35.2417	182.647
11	2	(Colombia) Juan Pablo Montoya	17.5590	17.6840	35.2430	182.641
12	15	(United States) Graham Rahal	17.6816	17.6364	35.3180	182.253
13	14	(Japan) Takuma Sato	17.7213	17.6556	35.3769	181.949
14	41	(United Kingdom) Jack Hawksworth	17.7138	17.7072	35.4255	181.700
15	26	(Colombia) Carlos Muñoz	17.8024	17.7469	35.5493	181.067
16	11	(France) Sébastien Bourdais	17.8887	17.6884	35.5771	180.925
17	98	(United States) Alexander Rossi R	17.7853	17.7929	35.5782	180.920
18	19	(Colombia) Gabby Chaves	17.8346	17.8481	35.6827	180.390
19	27	(United States) Marco Andretti W	17.7837	17.9196	35.7033	180.286
20	28	(United States) Ryan Hunter-Reay W	17.9788	17.8004	35.7792	179.903
21	18	(United States) Conor Daly R	18.0670	17.9641	36.0311	178.646
22	5	(Canada) James Hinchcliffe W	18.3330	18.4430	36.7760	175.027
OFFICIAL BOX SCORE

=== Race results ===
Pos	No.	Driver	Team	Engine	Laps	Time/Retired	Pit Stops	Grid	Laps Led	Pts.^{1}
1	21	(United States) Josef Newgarden	Ed Carpenter Racing	Chevrolet	300	1:52:16.3613	4	2	282	53
2	12	(Australia) Will Power	Team Penske	Chevrolet	300	+4.2828	4	8		40
3	9	(New Zealand) Scott Dixon	Chip Ganassi Racing	Chevrolet	300	+5.5085	4	10	1	36
4	22	(France) Simon Pagenaud	Team Penske	Chevrolet	300	+6.1827	4	1	11	34
5	7	(Russia) Mikhail Aleshin	Schmidt Peterson Motorsports	Honda	300	+7.0386	4	9		30
6	98	(United States) Alexander Rossi R	Andretti Herta Autosport	Honda	299	+1 Lap	4	17	4	29
7	10	(Brazil) Tony Kanaan W	Chip Ganassi Racing	Chevrolet	299	+1 Lap	4	6		26
8	11	(France) Sébastien Bourdais	KVSH Racing	Chevrolet	299	+1 Lap	5	16		24
9	5	(Canada) James Hinchcliffe W	Schmidt Peterson Motorsports	Honda	299	+1 Lap	4	22		22
10	83	(United States) Charlie Kimball	Chip Ganassi Racing	Chevrolet	299	+1 Lap	4	5		20
11	14	(Japan) Takuma Sato	A. J. Foyt Enterprises	Honda	298	+2 Laps	4	13		19
12	26	(Colombia) Carlos Muñoz	Andretti Autosport	Honda	298	+2 Laps	5	15		18
13	3	(Brazil) Hélio Castroneves	Team Penske	Chevrolet	298	+2 Laps	4	3		17
14	27	(United States) Marco Andretti W	Andretti Autosport	Honda	298	+2 Laps	4	19		16
15	41	(United Kingdom) Jack Hawksworth	A. J. Foyt Enterprises	Honda	298	+2 Laps	4	14		15
16	15	(United States) Graham Rahal	Rahal Letterman Lanigan Racing	Honda	297	+3 Laps	4	12		14
17	19	(Colombia) Gabby Chaves	Dale Coyne Racing	Honda	293	+7 Laps	5	18		13
18	20	(United States) Ed Carpenter	Ed Carpenter Racing	Chevrolet	284	+16 Laps	4	7		12
19	8	(United Kingdom) Max Chilton R	Chip Ganassi Racing	Chevrolet	274	+26 Laps	3	4	2	12
20	2	(Colombia) Juan Pablo Montoya	Team Penske	Chevrolet	179	Engine	3	11		10
21	18	(United States) Conor Daly R	Dale Coyne Racing	Honda	141	Mechanical	4	21		9
22	28	(United States) Ryan Hunter-Reay W	Andretti Autosport	Honda	105	Engine	1	20		8
OFFICIAL BOX SCORE

Notes

^{1} Points include 1 point for leading at least 1 lap during a race, an additional 2 points for leading the most race laps, and 1 point for Pole Position.

Source for time gaps:

== Championship standings after the race ==
Drivers' Championship standings

	Pos	Driver	Points
	1	(France) Simon Pagenaud	409
3	2	(United States) Josef Newgarden	336
	3	(Australia) Will Power	334
	4	(New Zealand) Scott Dixon	321
3	5	(Brazil) Hélio Castroneves	318

- Note: Only the top five positions are included.

Previous race: 2016 Kohler Grand Prix	IndyCar Series; 2016 season	Next race: 2016 Honda Indy Toronto
Previous race: 2015 Iowa Corn Indy 300	Iowa Corn 300	Next race: 2017 Iowa Corn 300
