= Max Chilton =

British racing driver (born 1991)

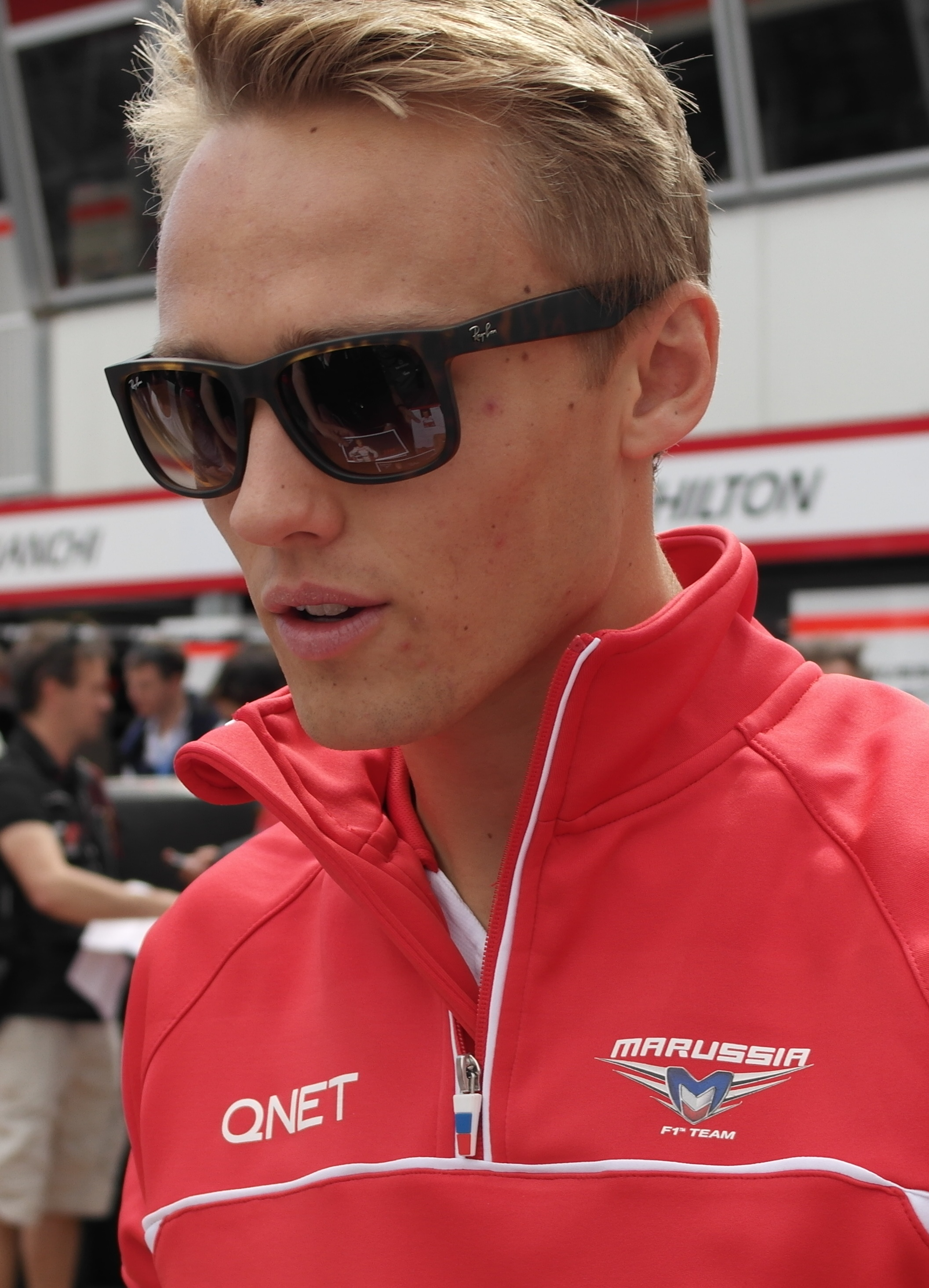
- Chilton at the 2013 Monaco Grand Prix
- Born: Maximilian Alexander Chilton; 21 April 1991 (age 35); Redhill, Surrey, England
- Spouse: Chloe Roberts (m. 2017)
- Children: 1
- Relatives: Tom Chilton (brother)

Formula One World Championship career
- Nationality: (United Kingdom) British
- Active years: 2013–2014
- Team: Marussia
- Car number: 4
- Entries: 35 (35 starts)
- Championships: 0
- Wins: 0
- Podiums: 0
- Career points: 0
- Pole positions: 0
- Fastest laps: 0
- First entry: 2013 Australian Grand Prix
- Last entry: 2014 Russian Grand Prix

IndyCar Series career
- 78 races run over 6 years
- Best finish: 11th (2017)
- First race: 2016 Grand Prix of St. Petersburg (St. Petersburg, Florida)
- Last race: 2021 Acura Grand Prix of Long Beach (Long Beach)
Wins	Podiums	Poles
0	0	0
- Categorisation: FIA Platinum

Previous series
- 2015; 2010–2012; 2009–2011; 2007–2009; 2005–2006: Indy Lights; GP2 Series; GP2 Asia Series; British F3; T Cars

Maximilian Alexander Chilton (born 21 April 1991) is a British former racing driver who competed in Formula One from 2013 to 2014, and the IndyCar Series from 2016 to 2021.

Born and raised in Redhill, Surrey, Chilton is the younger brother of racing driver Tom Chilton. He competed in the GP2 Series from 2010 to 2012, finishing fourth in the latter with Carlin. Chilton competed in Formula One for Marussia from 2013 to 2014. After Formula One, Chilton competed in the IndyCar Series from 2016 to 2021 for Chip Ganassi and Carlin. He holds the hillclimb record at the Goodwood Festival of Speed, set in 2022 in the McMurtry Spéirling.

== Early life ==
Chilton was born in Redhill and grew up in Reigate. His father, Grahame Chilton, is a businessman who co-owned the insurance company Benfield Group until 2008, when it was taken over by Aon plc for £738m. Chilton became vice-chairman of Aon after the deal and also collected around £77m for his stake. Chilton was educated at Ardingly College from 2000 to 2008. His brother, Tom Chilton, is also a racing driver.

== Career ==
=== Karting ===
Chilton started his racing career at the age of ten in karts where he spent two years learning the ropes in cadet karting before stepping up to junior TKM. He started to make a name for himself with J.I.C.A, where he made regular appearances on the podium, before turning his attention to car racing at the age of fourteen. Throughout this period, Chilton was racing in the Super 1 National Kart Championships.

=== T Cars ===
Chilton dovetailed his 2005 karting season with a season in the T Cars championship, for drivers between fourteen and seventeen years of age. He finished eighth in his first season, before going on to finish third in the Autumn Trophy. He continued in T Cars in 2006, where he finished as runner-up to Luciano Bacheta by three points. He won seven races to Bacheta's six.

=== Formula Three ===
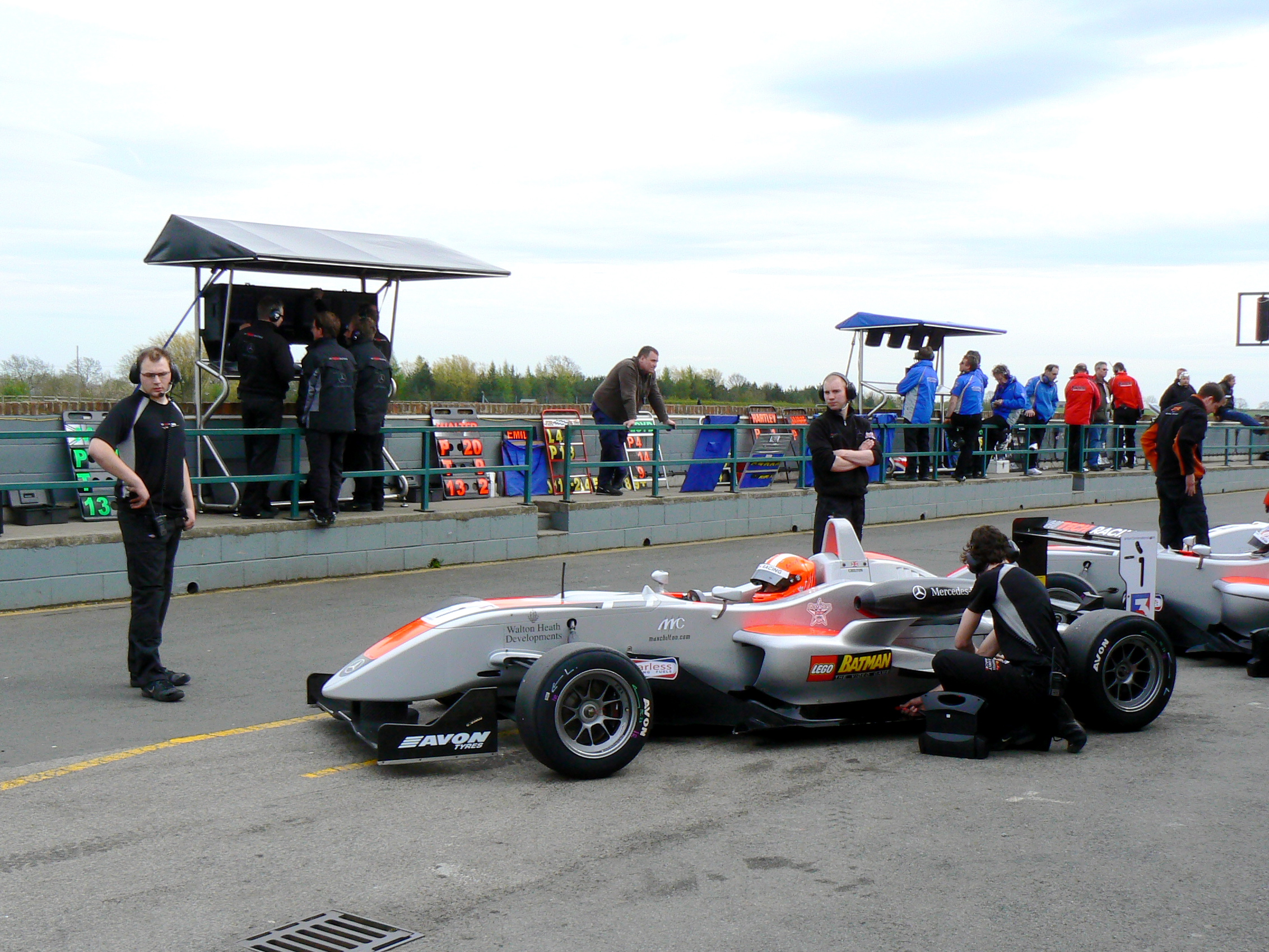
Chilton qualifying for Hitech Racing at the Croft round of the 2008 British Formula 3 season

Chilton made his debut at the second round of the 2007 British Formula 3 season for Arena International, despite being below the required age of sixteen to take part in the season opener having sought special dispensation on the eve of his sixteenth birthday. His best result was eleventh, in Bucharest and at Brands Hatch. He made one appearance in the Star Mazda Championship, at Laguna Seca – because he was a guest driver, Chilton was ineligible for points. He drove in the 2007 1000km of Silverstone for Arena with his brother Tom, and they finished sixth overall, eight laps down on the winning Peugeot 908 HDi FAP of Nicolas Minassian and Marc Gené.

For 2008, Chilton moved to David Hayle's Hitech Racing, and improved to tenth place in the championship. He recorded pole positions at Monza and Rockingham, and scored two podiums – second in the opening race at Oulton Park and third at Rockingham. He moved to Carlin Motorsport for the 2009 season, taking three pole positions in the first four races. He won twice during the season, the first at the Autódromo Internacional do Algarve in Portimão, and the second in his final Formula Three race at Brands Hatch.

=== GP2 Series ===
Chilton graduated to the GP2 Asia Series for the 2009–10 season, driving for Barwa Addax. From there Chilton moved to Ocean Racing Technology for the 2010 GP2 Series season championship with the highest place finish of fifth.

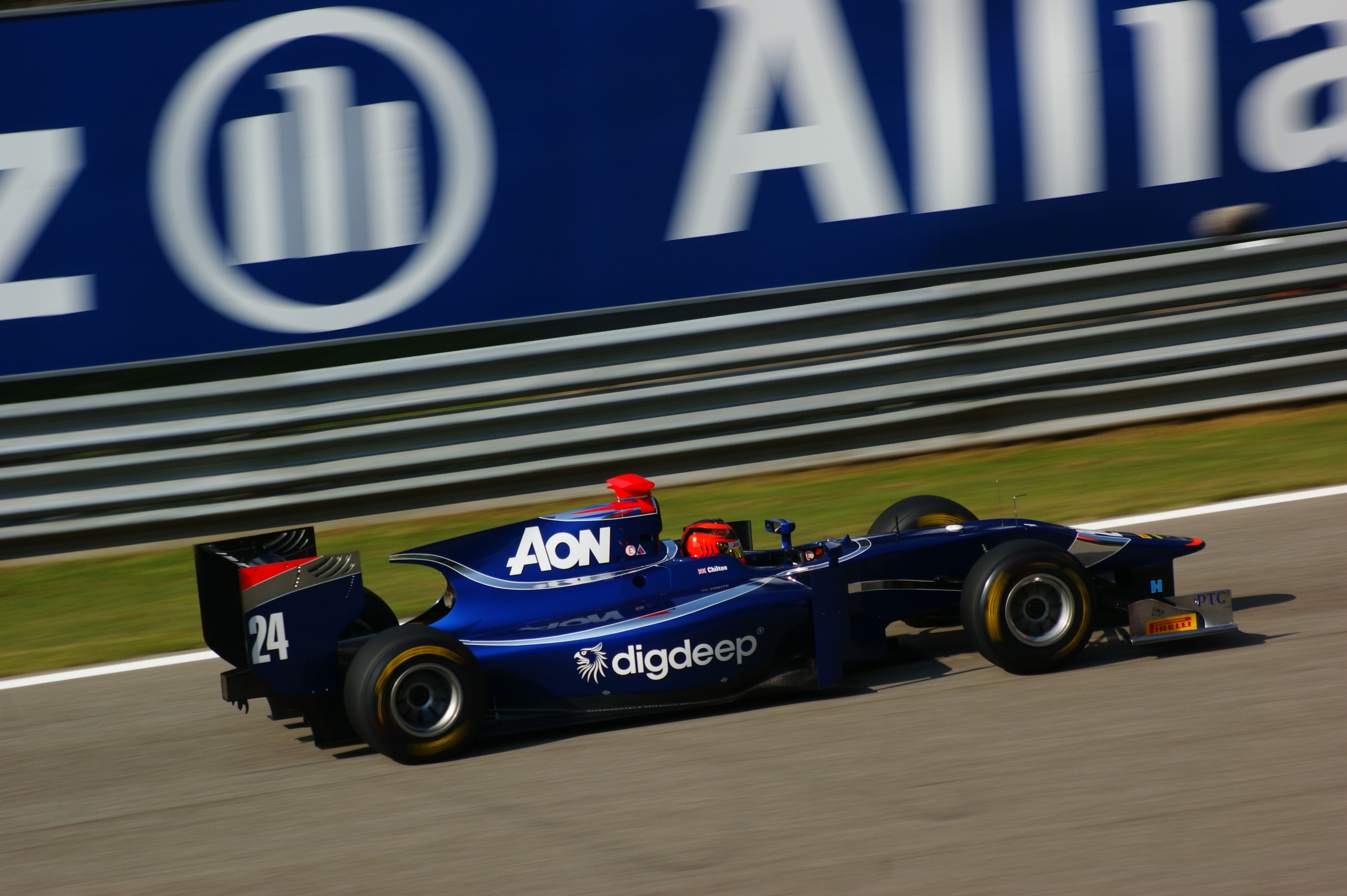
Chilton driving for Carlin at the Monza round of the 2011 GP2 Series season

In 2011, Chilton joined his father's Carlin team for the outfit's first foray into GP2, having previously driven for them in Formula Three. Partnered variously by reigning Formula Renault 3.5 Series champion Mikhail Aleshin and Álvaro Parente, he finished 22nd in the Asia series and 20th in the main series. He remained with the team, now with backing from the Marussia Formula One team, for the 2012 season alongside Rio Haryanto. He secured his first series podium finish in the feature race of the first round of the championship in Malaysia, and later his first pole position and race victory in the Hungarian feature race. This improvement in form, together with consistent points-scoring finishes throughout the season, resulted in Chilton rising to fourth place in the drivers' championship.

=== Formula One ===
==== Force India (2011) ====
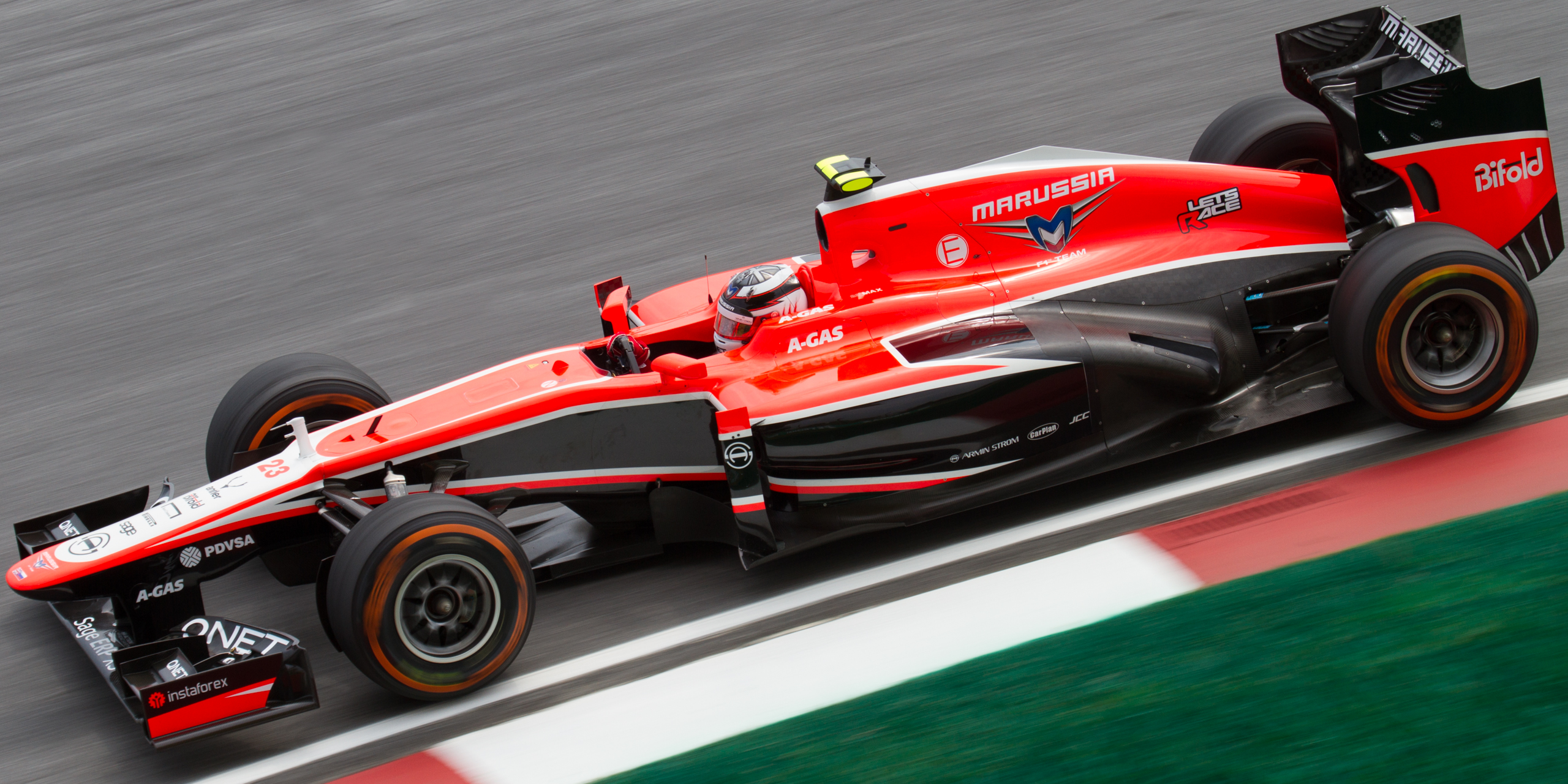
Chilton, driving for Marussia, at the 2013 Malaysian Grand Prix

In November 2011, Chilton drove for the Force India team in the Young Driver test at Abu Dhabi's Yas Marina Circuit. This was his second time driving Formula One machinery following a straight-line aerodynamic test for the team earlier in the year.

==== Marussia (2012–2014) ====
Chilton was appointed Marussia F1's testing and reserve driver for the second half of the 2012 season, starting from the Japanese Grand Prix. Chilton competed in the first practice session at the 2012 Abu Dhabi Grand Prix in November for Marussia F1.

In December 2012, Nikolai Fomenko, the engineering director of Marussia F1, announced that Chilton would race for the team full-time in 2013. The team confirmed the next day that Chilton would race. Chilton qualified twentieth on his debut at the Australian GP. He achieved his best finish of the season at the 2013 Monaco Grand Prix, when he finished in fourteenth place following several retirements. He achieved his best qualifying result of sixteenth position at the 2013 Belgian Grand Prix in a mixed-weather session where he was one of three drivers to go out on slick tyres at the end when the track's condition was improving.

Chilton is the only driver to have finished every race of his rookie season.

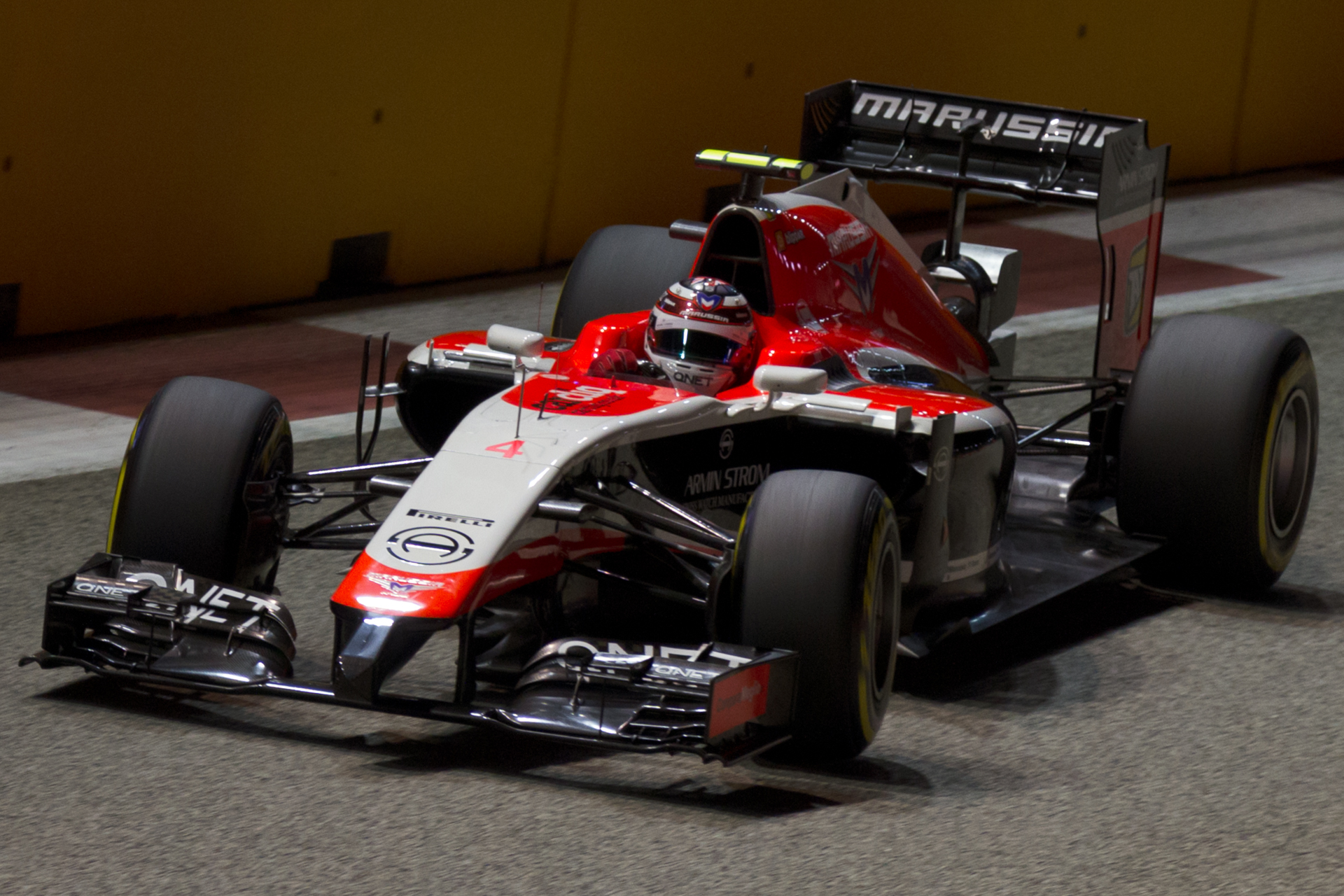
Chilton at the 2014 Singapore Grand Prix

On 11 January, it was announced that Marussia F1 would be retaining Chilton for the 2014 season. Chilton achieved his best finish to date at the Australian Grand Prix, finishing thirteenth. He finished 13th again at the Bahrain Grand Prix.

Chilton had finished every Formula One race he had contested until the 2014 Canadian Grand Prix, which meant that he had finished 25 consecutive races, nineteen of them in his rookie season. This was a record for most classified finishes in a rookie season. Lewis Hamilton holds the record for most consecutive classified finishes at 48. Chilton's Canadian Grand Prix retirement came when he collided with his teammate Jules Bianchi on the first lap, sending the Frenchman into the wall at Turn 4. Chilton received a three-place grid penalty at the following race. His season ended after Marussia went into administration and then closed down, resulting in Chilton missing the last three races of the season and having no seat for 2015.

=== IndyCar ===
==== Indy Lights ====
With no F1 seat for 2015, Chilton returned to Carlin for testing in order to assist them with their Indy Lights efforts, planning to move on to a full IndyCar Series drive in 2016. Chilton's maiden Indy Lights pole position and race win, taking place on the same weekend as Jules Bianchi's death, was dedicated to his former Formula One teammate and karting rival.

=== Chip Ganassi Racing (2016–2017) ===
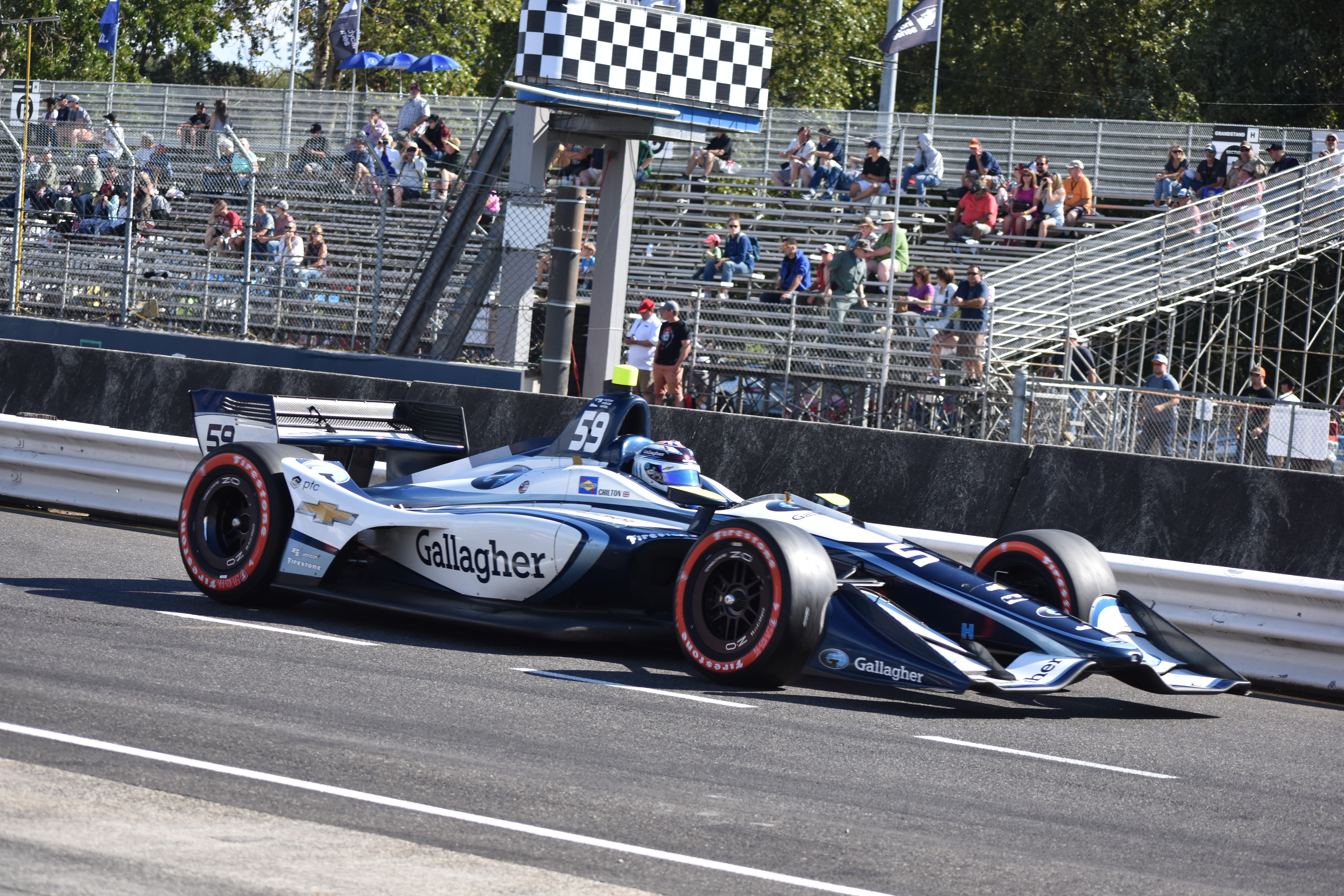
Chilton exiting out of the pits for qualifying in the 2018 Grand Prix of Portland

On 1 February 2016, Chilton joined Chip Ganassi Racing to compete in the IndyCar Series.

In the 2017 Indianapolis 500, Chilton dominated the latter part of the race and led 47 of the last 72 laps, but ultimately finished fourth. Chilton led the most laps total with 50.

=== Carlin (2018–2021) ===
On 13 December 2017, it was announced that Chilton would race for Carlin Motorsport for the 2018 IndyCar Series.

On 6 June 2019, it was announced that Chilton would no longer run races on oval tracks, with the exception of the Indy 500. Conor Daly would run the remainder of the oval races for the 2019 season for Carlin Motorsport.

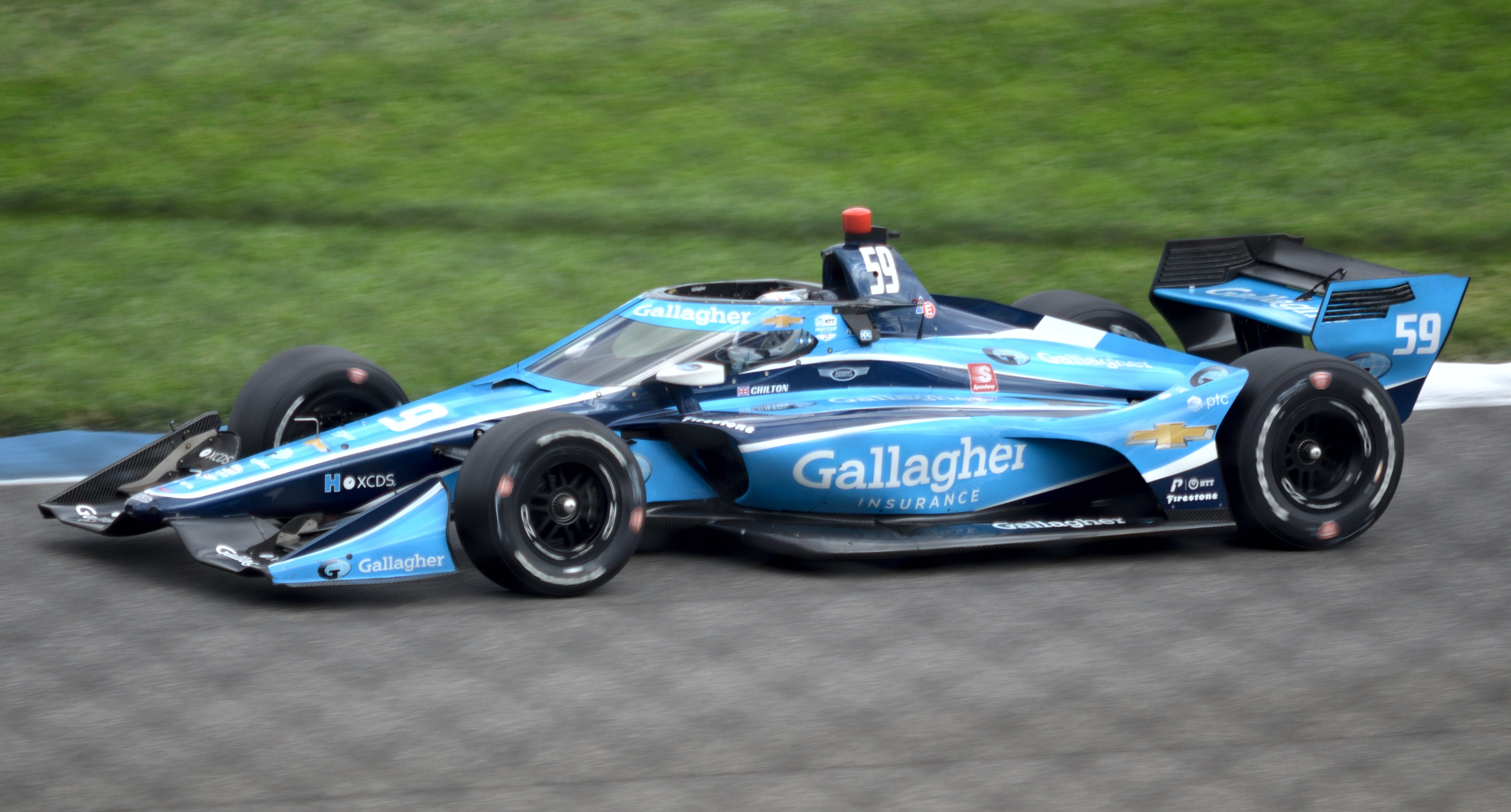
Chilton during the 2020 IndyCar Harvest GP

In February 2022, Chilton announced his retirement from IndyCar racing, in order to concentrate on other ventures, including the Le Mans Endurance Race.

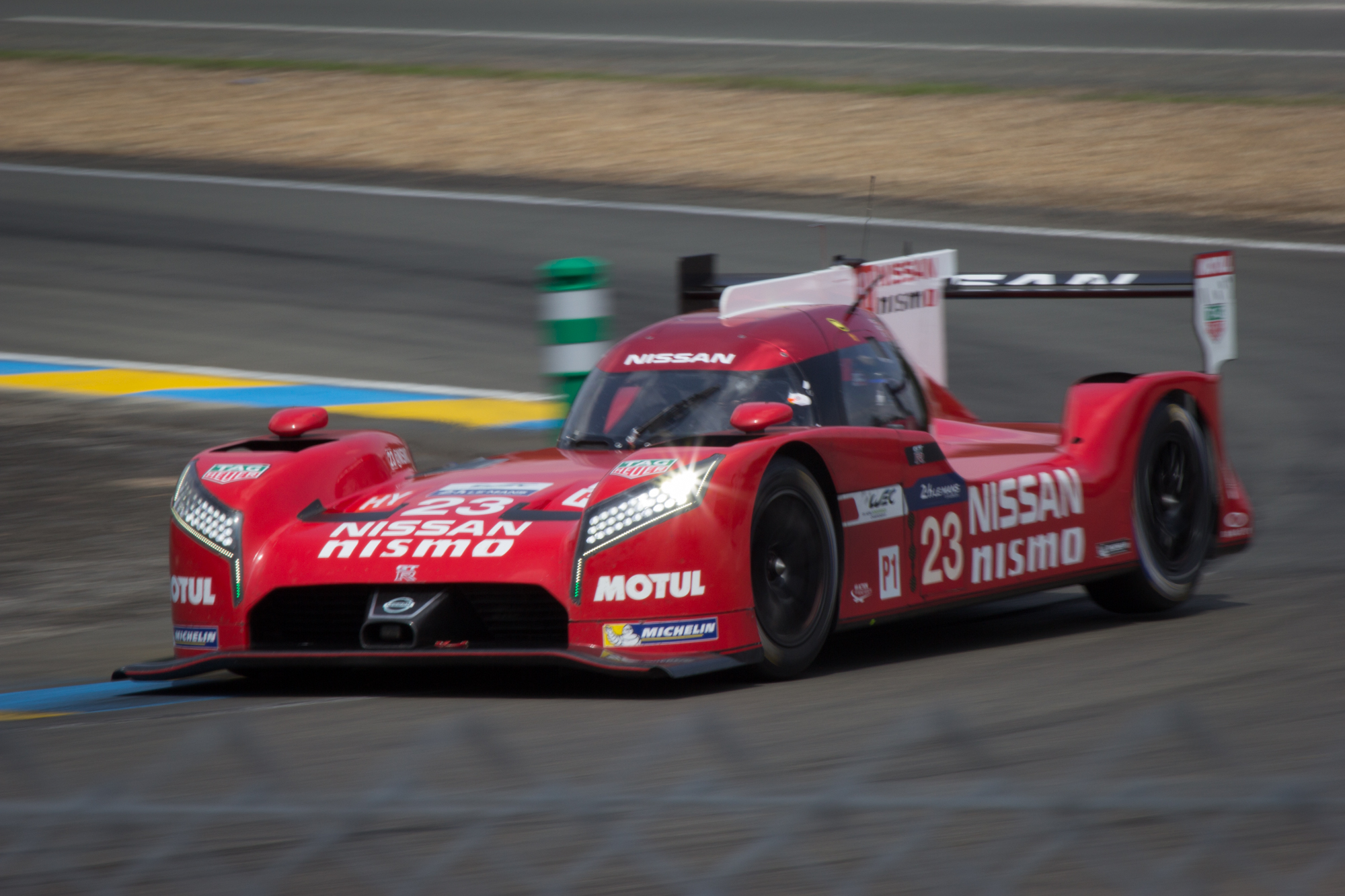
Chilton made his Le Mans debut in 2015 as a part of the short-lived Nissan GT-R LM Nismo effort

=== World Endurance Championship ===
==== Nissan (2015) ====
Chilton joined Nissan Motorsports to compete in the FIA World Endurance Championship in 2015. Chilton ran the 24 Hours of Le Mans for the team, retiring after 234 laps due to a suspension failure.

== Racing record ==
=== Career summary ===
Season	Series	Team name	Races	Wins	Poles	F/Laps	Podiums	Points	Position
2005	T Cars		?	?	?	?	7	?	8th
2005	T Cars Autumn Trophy		7	0	0	0	4	106	**3rd**
2006	T Cars	Tomax	20	7	7	?	14	167	**2nd**
2007	British Formula 3 Championship	Arena Motorsport	20	0	0	0	0	0	18th
2008	British Formula 3 Championship	Hitech Racing	22	0	2	1	2	72	10th
2009	British Formula 3 Championship	Carlin Motorsport	20	1	4	2	5	171	4th
2009	Formula Renault 3.5 Series	Comtec Racing	1	0	0	0	0	0	40th
2010	GP2 Series	Ocean Racing Technology	20	0	0	0	0	3	25th
2011	GP2 Series	Carlin	18	0	0	0	0	4	20th
2011	GP2 Final	Carlin	2	0	0	0	0	0	23rd
2011	Formula One	Sahara Force India F1 Team	Test driver						
2012	GP2 Series	Carlin	24	2	2	0	4	169	4th
2012	Formula One	Marussia F1 Team	Test/Reserve driver						
2013	Formula One	Marussia F1 Team	19	0	0	0	0	0	23rd
2014	Formula One	Marussia F1 Team	16	0	0	0	0	0	21st
2015	Indy Lights	Carlin Motorsport	13	1	3	2	6	258	5th
2015	FIA World Endurance Championship	Nissan Motorsports	1	0	0	0	0	0	34th
2016	IndyCar Series	Chip Ganassi Racing	16	0	0	1	0	267	19th
2017	IndyCar Series	Chip Ganassi Racing	17	0	0	0	0	396	11th
2018	IndyCar Series	Carlin	17	0	0	0	0	223	19th
2019	IndyCar Series	Carlin	12	0	0	0	0	184	22nd
2020	IndyCar Series	Carlin	9	0	0	0	0	147	22nd
2021	IndyCar Series	Carlin	12	0	0	0	0	135	25th
2022	Goodwood Festival of Speed		1	1	N/A	N/A	1	N/A	**1st**

=== Complete British Formula Three Championship results ===
(key) (Races in bold indicate pole position; races in italics indicate fastest lap)

Year	Entrant	Chassis	Engine	1	2	3	4	5	6	7	8	9	10	11	12	13	14	15	16	17	18	19	20	21	22	DC	Points	Ref
2007	Arena International Motorsport	Dallara F307	Mercedes	OUL; 1	OUL; 2	DON; 1; 20	DON; 2; 17	BUC; 1; 19	BUC; 2; 19	SNE; 1; 11	SNE; 2; 14	MNZ; 1; 13	MNZ; 2; 16	BRH; 1; 11	BRH; 2; 20	SPA; 1; 17	SPA; 2; 14	SIL; 1 Ret	SIL; 2; 26	THR; 1; 20	THR; 2 Ret	CRO; 1 Ret	CRO; 2 Ret	ROC; 1; 15	ROC; 2; 22	18th	0	
2008	Hitech Racing	Dallara F308	Mercedes HWA	OUL; 1; 2	OUL; 2; 14	CRO; 1; 22	CRO; 2; 10	MNZ; 1 Ret	**MNZ**; **2**; 4	**ROC**; **1**; 4	ROC; 2; 3	SNE; 1; 16	SNE; 2; 7	THR; 1; 14	THR; 2; 12	BRH; 1 Ret	BRH; 2; 10	SPA; 1; 17	SPA; 2; 10	SIL; 1; 7	SIL; 2; 10	BUC; 1; 6	BUC; 2; 16	DON; 1; 21	DON; 2; 11	10th	72	
2009	Carlin Motorsport	Dallara F309	Volkswagen	**OUL**; **1**; 17	OUL; 2; 4	**SIL1**; **1**; 2	**SIL1**; **2**; 3	ROC; 1; 5	ROC; 2; 10	HOC; 1; 5	HOC; 2; 16	SNE; 1; 6	SNE; 2; 7	DON; 1; 6	DON; 2; 7	SPA; 1; 8	SPA; 2; 6	SIL2; 1; 4	SIL2; 2; 7	ALG; 1; 6	**ALG**; **2**; 3	BRH; 1; 2	BRH; 2; 1			4th	171	

=== Complete GP2 Series results ===
(key) (Races in bold indicate pole position; races in italics indicate fastest lap)

Year	Entrant	1	2	3	4	5	6	7	8	9	10	11	12	13	14	15	16	17	18	19	20	21	22	23	24	DC	Points
2010	Ocean Racing Technology	CAT; FEA; 18	CAT; SPR; 16	MON; FEA; Ret	MON; SPR; 14	IST; FEA; 9	IST; SPR; 11	VAL; FEA; Ret	VAL; SPR; 11	SIL; FEA; 19	SIL; SPR; 19	HOC; FEA; 19	HOC; SPR; 16	HUN; FEA; 17	HUN; SPR; 16	SPA; FEA; 17	SPA; SPR; 11	MNZ; FEA; 8	MNZ; SPR; 5	YMC; FEA; 12	YMC; SPR; 12					24th	3
2011	Carlin	IST; FEA; Ret	IST; SPR; 17	CAT; FEA; 12	CAT; SPR; 11	MON; FEA; 7	MON; SPR; 6	VAL; FEA; Ret	VAL; SPR; Ret	SIL; FEA; Ret	SIL; SPR; 19	NÜR; FEA; 17	NÜR; SPR; 6	HUN; FEA; 18	HUN; SPR; Ret	SPA; FEA; 15	SPA; SPR; 16	MNZ; FEA; Ret	MNZ; SPR; 18							20th	4
2012	Carlin	SEP; FEA; 3	SEP; SPR; 7	BHR1; FEA; 4	BHR1; SPR; 5	BHR2; FEA; 5	BHR2; SPR; 13	CAT; FEA; 7	CAT; SPR; 5	MON; FEA; 5	MON; SPR; 2	VAL; FEA; 7	VAL; SPR; 4	SIL; FEA; 9	SIL; SPR; 19	HOC; FEA; 14	HOC; SPR; Ret	**HUN**; **FEA**; 1	HUN; SPR; 11	SPA; FEA; 12	SPA; SPR; 22	**MNZ**; **FEA**; 4	MNZ; SPR; 6	MRN; FEA; 1	MRN; SPR; 19	4th	169

==== Complete GP2 Asia Series results ====
(key) (Races in bold indicate pole position; races in italics indicate fastest lap)

Year	Entrant	1	2	3	4	5	6	7	8	DC	Points
2009–10	Barwa Addax Team	YMC1; FEA; 16	YMC1; SPR; 17			BHR1; FEA; 18	BHR1; SPR; 12	BHR2; FEA; 19	BHR2; SPR; 15	18th	2
2009–10	Ocean Racing Technology			YMC2; FEA; 8	YMC2; SPR; 6					18th	2
2011	Carlin	YMC; FEA; 12	YMC; SPR; 18	IMO; FEA; 22	IMO; SPR; 15					22nd	0

==== Complete GP2 Final results ====
(key) (Races in bold indicate pole position) (Races in italics indicate fastest lap)

Year	Entrant	1	2	DC	Points
2011	Carlin	YMC; FEA; Ret	YMC; SPR; 16	23rd	0

=== Complete Formula One results ===
(key) (Races in bold indicate pole position; races in italics indicates fastest lap)

Year	Entrant	Chassis	Engine	1	2	3	4	5	6	7	8	9	10	11	12	13	14	15	16	17	18	19	20	WDC	Points
2012	Marussia F1 Team	Marussia MR01	Cosworth CA2012 2.4 V8	AUS	MAL	CHN	BHR	ESP	MON	CAN	EUR	GBR	GER	HUN	BEL	ITA	SIN	JPN	KOR	IND	ABU; TD	USA	BRA	–	–
2013	Marussia F1 Team	Marussia MR02	Cosworth CA2013 2.4 V8	AUS; 17	MAL; 16	CHN; 17	BHR; 20	ESP; 19	MON; 14	CAN; 19	GBR; 17	GER; 19	HUN; 17	BEL; 19	ITA; 20	SIN; 17	KOR; 17	JPN; 19	IND; 17	ABU; 21	USA; 21	BRA; 19		23rd	0
2014	Marussia F1 Team	Marussia MR03	Ferrari 059/3 1.6 V6 t	AUS; 13	MAL; 15	BHR; 13	CHN; 19	ESP; 19	MON; 14	CAN; Ret	AUT; 17	GBR; 16	GER; 17	HUN; 16	BEL; 16	ITA; Ret	SIN; 17	JPN; 18	RUS; Ret	USA	BRA	ABU		21st	0

=== American open-wheel racing results ===
==== Indy Lights ====
Year	Team	1	2	3	4	5	6	7	8	9	10	11	12	13	14	15	16	Rank	Points	Ref
2015	Carlin Motorsport	STP; 12	STP; 4	LBH; 5	ALA; 5	ALA; 3	IMS; 4	IMS; 3	INDY; DNS	TOR	TOR	MIL; 6	**IOW**; 1	MOH; 2	MOH; 2	**LAG**; 11	**LAG**; 3	5th	258	

==== IndyCar Series ====
(key)

Year	Team	No.	Chassis	Engine	1	2	3	4	5	6	7	8	9	10	11	12	13	14	15	16	17	Rank	Points	Ref
2016	Chip Ganassi Racing	8	Dallara DW12	Chevrolet	STP; 17	PHX; 7	LBH; 14	ALA; 21	IMS; 14	INDY; 15	DET; 21	DET; 22	ROA; 20	IOW; 19	TOR; 18	MOH; 16	POC; 13	TXS; 15	WGL; 10	SNM; 16		19th	267	
2017	Chip Ganassi Racing	8	Dallara DW12	Honda	STP; 16	LBH; 14	ALA; 12	PHX; 20	IMS; 7	INDY; 4	DET; 11	DET; 15	TXS; 8	ROA; 9	IOW; 14	TOR; 7	MOH; 15	POC; 18	GTW; 17	WGL; 8	SNM; 12	11th	396	
2018	Carlin	59	Dallara DW12	Chevrolet	STP; 19	PHX; 18	LBH; 17	ALA; 22	IMS; 16	INDY; 22	DET; 20	DET; 11	TXS; 12	ROA; 17	IOW; 15	TOR; 23	MOH; 24	POC; 13	GTW; 17	POR; 18	SNM; 21	19th	223	
2019	Carlin	59	Dallara DW12	Chevrolet	STP; 16	COA; 21	ALA; 22	LBH; 14	IMS; 18	INDY; DNQ	DET; 17	DET; 15	TXS	RDA; 16	TOR; 14	IOW	MOH; 16	POC	GTW	POR; 11	LAG; 13	22nd	184	
2020	Carlin	59	Dallara DW12	Chevrolet	TXS	IMS; 16	ROA; 17	ROA; 15	IOW	IOW	INDY; 17	GTW	GTW	MOH; 16	MOH; 13	IMS; 11	IMS; 19	STP; 12				22nd	147	
2021	Carlin	59	Dallara DW12	Chevrolet	ALA; 20	STP; 24	TXS	TXS	IMS	INDY; 24	DET; 22	DET; 22	ROA; 10	MOH; 18	NSH; 18	IMS; 20	GTW	POR; 19	LAG; 21	LBH; 15		25th	134	

==== Indianapolis 500 ====
Year	Chassis	Engine	Start	Finish	Team
2016	Dallara	Chevrolet	22	15	Chip Ganassi Racing
2017	Dallara	Honda	15	4	Chip Ganassi Racing
2018	Dallara	Chevrolet	20	22	Carlin
2019	Dallara	Chevrolet	DNQ		Carlin
2020	Dallara	Chevrolet	30	17	Carlin
2021	Dallara	Chevrolet	29	24	Carlin

=== Complete FIA World Endurance Championship results ===
Year	Entrant	Class	Chassis	Engine	1	2	3	4	5	6	7	8	Rank	Points
2015	Nissan Motorsports	LMP1	Nissan GT-R LM Nismo	Nissan VRX30A 3.0 L Turbo V6	SIL	SPA	LMS; Ret	NÜR	COA	FUJ	SHA	BHR	34th	0

=== Complete 24 Hours of Le Mans results ===
Year	Team	Co-Drivers	Car	Class	Laps	Pos.	Class Pos.
2015	(Japan) Nissan Motorsports	(France) Olivier Pla (United Kingdom) Jann Mardenborough	Nissan GT-R LM Nismo	LMP1	234	DNF	DNF
