= 2017 IndyCar Grand Prix at The Glen =

(United States) 2017 Watkins Glen
Race details
16th round of the 2017 IndyCar Series season
← Previous race	Next race →
- Date: September 3, 2017
- Official name: Grand Prix at The Glen
- Location: Watkins Glen International
- Course: Permanent racing facility 3.370 mi / 5.423 km
- Distance: 60 laps 202.200 mi / 325.409 km

Pole position
- Driver: (United States) Alexander Rossi (Andretti Autosport)
- Time: 1:22.4639

Fastest lap
- Driver: (France) Sebastien Bourdais (Dale Coyne Racing)
- Time: 1:23.9166 (on lap 59 of 60)

Podium
- First: (United States) Alexander Rossi (Andretti Autosport)
- Second: (New Zealand) Scott Dixon (Chip Ganassi Racing)
- Third: (United States) Ryan Hunter-Reay (Andretti Autosport)

The 2017 IndyCar Grand Prix at The Glen was the 16th and penultimate round of the 2017 Verizon IndyCar Series. The race was on September 3, 2017. The pole position was won by Alexander Rossi, the first of his career. Rossi would go on to convert the pole into a win, the second of his career and first on a road course. As of 2026, this is the final IndyCar race at Watkins Glen, as well as the final win for Bryan Herta Autosport as Rossi would move to the #27 car at Andretti Autosport for the 2018 season.

== Results ==
Key	Meaning
R	Rookie
W	Past winner

=== Qualifying ===
Pos	No.	Name	Grp.	Round 1	Round 2	Firestone Fast 6
1	98	(United States) Alexander Rossi	1	1:23.0804	1:22.7961	1:22.4639
2	9	(New Zealand) Scott Dixon W	2	1:23.0382	1:22.4171	1:22.5168
3	2	(United States) Josef Newgarden	1	1:23.1305	1:22.9822	1:22.5169
4	26	(Japan) Takuma Sato	1	1:23.2479	1:22.8254	1:22.5660
5	83	(United States) Charlie Kimball	1	1:23.2775	1:22.9014	1:22.8081
6	3	(Brazil) Hélio Castroneves	1	1:23.2093	1:22.9662	1:23.3350
7	28	(United States) Ryan Hunter-Reay W	2	1:23.0438	1:22.9854	
8	12	(Australia) Will Power W	1	1:23.4104	1:23.0987	
9	18	(France) Sébastien Bourdais	2	1:23.1444	1:23.1459	
10	15	(United States) Graham Rahal	2	1:23.2932	1:23.2240	
11	14	(Colombia) Carlos Muñoz	2	1:23.5022	1:23.2959	
12	1	(France) Simon Pagenaud	1	1:23.3266	1:23.2981	
13	20	(United States) Spencer Pigot	1	1:23.4917		
14	4	(United States) Conor Daly	2	1:23.5089		
15	19	(United Arab Emirates) Ed Jones R	1	1:23.9851		
16	5	(Canada) James Hinchcliffe	2	1:23.6854		
17	10	(Brazil) Tony Kanaan	1	1:23.9982		
18	7	(United Kingdom) Jack Harvey R	2	1:24.1390		
19	8	(United Kingdom) Max Chilton	1	1:24.2012		
20	27	(United States) Marco Andretti	2	1:24.1779		
21	21	(United States) J. R. Hildebrand	2	1:24.4543		
OFFICIAL BOX SCORE

=== Race results ===
Pos	No.	Driver	Team	Engine	Laps	Time/Retired	Pit Stops	Grid	Laps Led	Pts.^{1}
1	98	(United States) Alexander Rossi	Andretti Herta Autosport	Honda	60	1:42:03.9024	4	1	32	54
2	9	(New Zealand) Scott Dixon W	Chip Ganassi Racing	Honda	60	+0.9514	4	2	2	41
3	28	(United States) Ryan Hunter-Reay W	Andretti Autosport	Honda	60	+7.1592	4	7	4	36
4	3	(Brazil) Hélio Castroneves	Team Penske	Chevrolet	60	+8.8938	4	6	13	33
5	15	(United States) Graham Rahal	Rahal Letterman Lanigan Racing	Honda	60	+11.8863	4	10	-	30
6	12	(Australia) Will Power W	Team Penske	Chevrolet	60	+15.3787	4	8	-	28
7	83	(United States) Charlie Kimball	Chip Ganassi Racing	Honda	60	+16.1639	4	5	-	26
8	8	(United Kingdom) Max Chilton	Chip Ganassi Racing	Honda	60	+28.0410	4	19	-	24
9	1	(France) Simon Pagenaud	Team Penske	Chevrolet	60	+28.2941	4	12	-	22
10	14	(Colombia) Carlos Muñoz	A. J. Foyt Enterprises	Chevrolet	60	+29.4972	4	11	-	20
11	4	(United States) Conor Daly	A. J. Foyt Enterprises	Chevrolet	60	+30.2436	4	14	-	19
12	20	(United States) Spencer Pigot	Ed Carpenter Racing	Chevrolet	60	+32.3478	5	13	8	19
13	19	(United Arab Emirates) Ed Jones R	Dale Coyne Racing	Honda	60	+33.1533	4	15	-	17
14	7	(United Kingdom) Jack Harvey R	Schmidt Peterson Motorsports	Honda	60	+35.6826	5	18	-	16
15	21	(United States) J. R. Hildebrand	Ed Carpenter Racing	Chevrolet	60	+41.5905	5	21	-	15
16	27	(United States) Marco Andretti	Andretti Autosport	Honda	60	+52.7948	4	20	-	14
17	18	(France) Sébastien Bourdais	Dale Coyne Racing	Honda	60	+54.0444	6	9	-	13
18	2	(United States) Josef Newgarden	Team Penske	Chevrolet	58	+2 Laps	7	3	1	13
19	26	(Japan) Takuma Sato	Andretti Autosport	Honda	56	+4 Laps	6	4	-	11
20	10	(Brazil) Tony Kanaan	Chip Ganassi Racing	Honda	46	Contact	4	17	-	10
21	5	(Canada) James Hinchcliffe	Schmidt Peterson Motorsports	Honda	5	Mechanical	1	16	-	9
OFFICIAL BOX SCORE

Notes

^{1} Points include 1 point for leading at least 1 lap during a race, an additional 2 points for leading the most race laps, and 1 point for Pole Position.

== Championship standings ==
Driver standings

Pos	Driver	Points
1	(United States) Josef Newgarden	560
2	(New Zealand) Scott Dixon	557
3	(Brazil) Hélio Castroneves	538
4	(France) Simon Pagenaud	526
5	(Australia) Will Power	492

Manufacturer standings

Pos	Manufacturer	Points
1	(United States) Chevrolet	1,353
2	(Japan) Honda	1,254

- Note: Only the top-five drivers in the standings are included.

Previous race: 2017 Bommarito Automotive Group 500	IndyCar Series; 2017 season	Next race: 2017 GoPro Grand Prix of Sonoma
Previous race: 2016 IndyCar Grand Prix at The Glen	Grand Prix at The Glen	Next race: None
