= 2017 ABC Supply 500 =

(United States) 2017 ABC Supply 500
Race details
14th round of the 2017 IndyCar Series season
← Previous race	Next race →
- Date: August 20, 2017
- Official name: ABC Supply 500
- Location: Pocono Raceway
- Course: Permanent racing facility 2.5 mi / 4.0 km
- Distance: 200 laps 500 mi / 800 km

Pole position
- Driver: (Japan) Takuma Sato (Andretti Autosport)
- Time: 40.9008 + 41.0518 = 1:21.9526

Fastest lap
- Driver: (Brazil) Tony Kanaan (Chip Ganassi Racing)
- Time: 41.2230 (on lap 182 of 200)

Podium
- First: (Australia) Will Power (Team Penske)
- Second: (United States) Josef Newgarden (Team Penske)
- Third: (United States) Alexander Rossi (Andretti Herta Autosport)

The 2017 ABC Supply 500 was the 14th round of the 2017 IndyCar Series season. The race was held on August 20 at Pocono Raceway in Long Pond, Pennsylvania. Takuma Sato qualified on pole for the race, while Will Power managed to take victory despite being over a lap down at one point. Power became the first driver to earn back-to-back Pocono 500 wins.

== Qualifying ==
Qualifying was held on Saturday, August 19. Despite being the last driver on track, Takuma Sato qualified on pole position with a two lap time of 1:21.9526 (219.639 mph), besting Simon Pagenaud, Charlie Kimball, Tony Kanaan, and Will Power. It was Sato's second pole of the season.

The session was marred by two major crashes. Hélio Castroneves crashed heavily in turn one during his qualifying attempt, relegating him to a 20th place start. Later in the session, Ryan Hunter-Reay crashed heavily in turn three, then made further contact with the inside wall on the front stretch. Accelerometers measured the impact with a lateral g-force of 138 g. Hunter-Reay walked away from the incident but suffered hip and left knee injuries and was transported to Lehigh Valley Hospital–Cedar Crest in Allentown for examination. He suffered no broken bones and was cleared to drive the following day, but was forced to start in 21st due to his incident.

Ed Carpenter made no attempt to qualifying after suffering damage to his car in a crash during the morning practice session.

== Race ==
The race was held on Sunday, August 20. The start of the race saw Tony Kanaan launch into the lead with Alexander Rossi taking up second place behind. Takuma Sato, despite his pole start, began to quickly drop through the field. Several drivers who started farther back in the field, including Scott Dixon, Josef Newgarden, and Hélio Castroneves, began to work their way forward quickly in the opening laps as well. At the front of the field, the lead changed on lap 12, as Rossi managed to pass Kanaan. On lap 23, the first of the race's caution periods came out after Esteban Gutiérrez made contact with the turn 3 wall, causing parts of his rear wing to break off and land on the track. Gutiérrez would be forced to retire from the race from the damage sustained in the incident. During the caution, teams took the opportunity to make their first round of pit stops, with Rossi retaining the lead, but now with Will Power running second, Kanaan third, and Dixon fourth. During the stops, Max Chilton lost several laps after suffering from turbo-wastegate issues that required repair by his crew.

The restart came at lap 27, with Kanaan managing to sweep back into the lead while Power moved into second. Rossi struggled on the restart and by the end of two laps had fallen down to sixth place. On lap 30, the lead of the race changed hands again, as Dixon managed to move to the front of the field. By roughly 50 laps in, Dixon remained the leader, but the order behind continued to shuffle as Rossi moved up to second and James Hinchcliffe and Josef Newgarden moved into the top five. Green flag pit stops came around lap 55, but the top five remained largely unchanged. On lap 60, Rossi briefly took over the lead, before being re-passed by Dixon five laps later. Behind them, Power began to plummet down the order as the snap-adjuster on his front wing broke. Power eventually had to stop to have this fixed, placing him one lap down.

Up front, the battle for the lead became saw Hinchcliffe add his name to contention, as he, Dixon, and Rossi exchanged the lead several times over the next several laps. Another round of green flag pit stops came and went, but Hinchcliffe dropped well down the order after overshooting his pit stall. Replacing him in the battle for the lead was Ryan Hunter-Reay, despite his injuries sustained during qualifying. This battle continued to lap 116, when green flag pit stops came again. However, midway through the cycle, Sebastián Saavedra made contact with the turn two wall, bringing out another caution. Several drivers, including Newgarden and Castroneves, were caught out by the caution and forced to pit when everyone else had already stopped. After the stops, Hunter-Reay led Graham Rahal, Kanaan, Dixon, and Rossi. During the yellow flag, Power was able to get back onto the lead lap by not pitting during the caution.

Racing resumed on lap 122, with both Rahal and Kanaan passing Hunter-Reay, moving Rahal into the lead, the next lap, Kanaan took the lead. Behind them, the caution came again as Hinchcliffe and J. R. Hildebrand tangled in turn 1. During the caution, Power pitted again, partly to repair damage sustained while attempting to avoid the incident, and partly to top off on fuel. Kanaan and Rahal continued out front.

Racing resumed again on lap 132, with Rahal moving back around Kanaan for the lead. This began a battle between the two that saw them exchange the lead nearly every lap through lap 150. Rahal and Kanaan had 15 lead changes in 18 laps. Many of the leaders pitted at this point, putting Will Power into the lead. Even after his pit stop on lap 161, Power maintained his lead over the field. One more round of pit stops remained, which Power emerged back out in front, while Newgarden and Rossi became the closest pursuers. However, Rossi suffered a broken fuel-nob, forcing him to remain in full-savings mode while Power and Newgarden went on ahead. In the closing laps, Newgarden managed to catch up to Power an attempt to make a pass, but eventually ran out of time, allowing Power to take his second consecutive win at Pocono. Rossi managed to hold onto third place, while the top five was rounded up by Simon Pagenaud and Tony Kanaan. Scott Dixon, who led the most laps of the race, finished sixth.

Power's victory moved him up to 8th in all time American open-wheel victories, while also allowing him to remain in championship contention. Newgarden, however, managed to extend his lead over everyone else thanks to his second-place finish, extending his point's lead to 18 points.

After the race, it was revealed that relations between Chip Ganassi Racing and its drivers had become heated after Max Chilton was parked by the team after completing only 129 laps of the race. While the car was three laps down, Chilton expressed extreme displeasure over the radio, saying, "[Whoever gave me] this instruction is brain dead. It's the first time I've had a decent car in a while. Why can't we learn, or are we a quitting team? Good riddance, [I] can't wait for next year."

== Results ==
Key	Meaning
R	Rookie
W	Past winner

=== Qualifying ===
Pos	No.	Name	Lap 1 Time	Lap 2 Time	Total Time	Avg. Speed (mph)
1	26	(Japan) Takuma Sato	40.9008	41.0518	1:21.9526	219.639
2	1	(France) Simon Pagenaud	41.0308	41.0129	1:22.0437	219.395
3	83	(United States) Charlie Kimball	41.0235	41.0301	1:22.0536	219.369
4	10	(Brazil) Tony Kanaan	41.1149	41.0725	1:22.1874	219.012
5	12	(Australia) Will Power W	41.0999	41.2093	1:22.3092	218.688
6	98	(United States) Alexander Rossi	41.3626	40.9712	1:22.3338	218.622
7	15	(United States) Graham Rahal	41.2368	41.2945	1:22.5313	218.099
8	88	(Colombia) Gabby Chaves	41.2375	41.3237	1:22.5612	218.020
9	9	(New Zealand) Scott Dixon W	41.2721	41.3655	1:22.6376	217.819
10	8	(United Kingdom) Max Chilton	41.2114	41.4530	1:22.6644	217.748
11	19	(United Arab Emirates) Ed Jones R	41.4143	41.3197	1:22.7340	217.565
12	5	(Canada) James Hinchcliffe	41.3224	41.4148	1:22.7372	217.556
13	18	(Mexico) Esteban Gutiérrez R	41.3359	41.5018	1:22.8377	217.292
14	2	(United States) Josef Newgarden	41.2537	41.6060	1:22.8597	217.235
15	7	(Colombia) Sebastián Saavedra	41.4527	41.5185	1:22.9712	216.943
16	27	(United States) Marco Andretti	41.3561	41.6693	1:23.0254	216.801
17	4	(United States) Conor Daly	41.6895	41.6576	1:23.3471	215.964
18	14	(Colombia) Carlos Muñoz	41.8369	41.8393	1:23.6762	215.115
19	21	(United States) J. R. Hildebrand	41.7134	42.0122	1:23.7256	214.988
20	3	(Brazil) Hélio Castroneves	-	-	No Time	No Speed
21	28	(United States) Ryan Hunter-Reay W	-	-	No Time	No Speed
22	20	(United States) Ed Carpenter	-	-	No Time	No Speed
OFFICIAL BOX SCORE

Source for individual laps:

=== Race ===
Pos	No.	Driver	Team	Engine	Laps	Time/Retired	Pit Stops	Grid	Laps Led	Pts.^{1}
1	12	(Australia) Will Power W	Team Penske	Chevrolet	200	2:43:16.6005	10	5	34	51
2	2	(United States) Josef Newgarden	Team Penske	Chevrolet	200	+0.5268	7	14	4	41
3	98	(United States) Alexander Rossi	Andretti Herta Autosport	Honda	200	+0.7112	6	6	44	36
4	1	(France) Simon Pagenaud	Team Penske	Chevrolet	200	+0.8770	6	2		32
5	10	(Brazil) Tony Kanaan	Chip Ganassi Racing	Honda	200	+2.9056	6	4	32	31
6	9	(New Zealand) Scott Dixon W	Chip Ganassi Racing	Honda	200	+3.3544	6	9	51	31
7	3	(Brazil) Hélio Castroneves	Team Penske	Chevrolet	200	+3.7273	6	20		26
8	28	(United States) Ryan Hunter-Reay W	Andretti Autosport	Honda	200	+4.0833	6	21	12	25
9	15	(United States) Graham Rahal	Rahal Letterman Lanigan Racing	Honda	200	+4.6884	6	7	9	23
10	14	(Colombia) Carlos Muñoz	A. J. Foyt Enterprises	Chevrolet	200	+6.9330	7	18		20
11	27	(United States) Marco Andretti	Andretti Autosport	Honda	200	+9.4607	7	16	9	20
12	20	(United States) Ed Carpenter	Ed Carpenter Racing	Chevrolet	200	+10.4503	6	22		18
13	26	(Japan) Takuma Sato	Andretti Autosport	Honda	200	+11.2388	6	1		18
14	4	(United States) Conor Daly	A. J. Foyt Enterprises	Chevrolet	200	+19.8050	9	17		16
15	88	(Colombia) Gabby Chaves	Harding Racing	Chevrolet	200	+20.6790	8	8		15
16	83	(United States) Charlie Kimball	Chip Ganassi Racing	Honda	200	+24.4523	7	3		14
17	19	(United Arab Emirates) Ed Jones R	Dale Coyne Racing	Honda	200	+25.0689	6	11		13
18	8	(United Kingdom) Max Chilton	Chip Ganassi Racing	Honda	129	Mechanical	8	10		12
19	21	(United States) J. R. Hildebrand	Ed Carpenter Racing	Chevrolet	124	Contact	4	19	2	12
20	5	(Canada) James Hinchcliffe	Schmidt Peterson Motorsports	Honda	124	Contact	4	12	3	11
21	7	(Colombia) Sebastián Saavedra	Schmidt Peterson Motorsports	Honda	114	Contact	3	15		9
22	18	(Mexico) Esteban Gutiérrez R	Dale Coyne Racing	Honda	23	Contact	1	13		8
OFFICIAL BOX SCORE

Notes

^{1} Points include 1 point for leading at least 1 lap during a race, an additional 2 points for leading the most race laps, and 1 point for Pole Position.

Source for time gaps:

== Championship standings ==
Driver standings

	Pos	Driver	Points
	1	(United States) Josef Newgarden	494
1	2	(New Zealand) Scott Dixon	476
1	3	(Brazil) Hélio Castroneves	472
	4	(France) Simon Pagenaud	468
	5	(Australia) Will Power	452

Manufacturer standings

Pos	Manufacturer	Points
1	(United States) Chevrolet	1,205
2	(Japan) Honda	1,118

- Note: Only the top five positions are included.

== Broadcasting ==
Saturday morning's one hour and fifteen minute practice session and the half hour final practice in the afternoon were both streamed live on the IndyCar YouTube channel. The qualifying session was televised by NBCSN.

The race was broadcast on NBCSN. The booth announcers were Kevin Lee, Paul Tracy, and Townsend Bell. Pit reporters were Jon Beekhuis, Katie Hargitt, Anders Krohn, and Robin Miller.

In the United States, the race got a 0.40 TV rating and 618,000 viewers. It was the most-watched IndyCar race on NBCSN in 2017.

Indianapolis Motor Speedway Radio Network provided coverage of the event on radio. Mark Jaynes and Zach Veach were the announcers in the booth. Reporting from the turns were Nick Yeoman and Jake Query. From pit road were Dave Furst and Jim Murphy.

Previous race: 2017 Honda Indy 200	IndyCar Series; 2017 season	Next race: 2017 Bommarito Automotive Group 500
Previous race: 2016 ABC Supply 500	ABC Supply 500	Next race: 2018 ABC Supply 500
