= Graham Rahal =

American racing driver (born 1989)

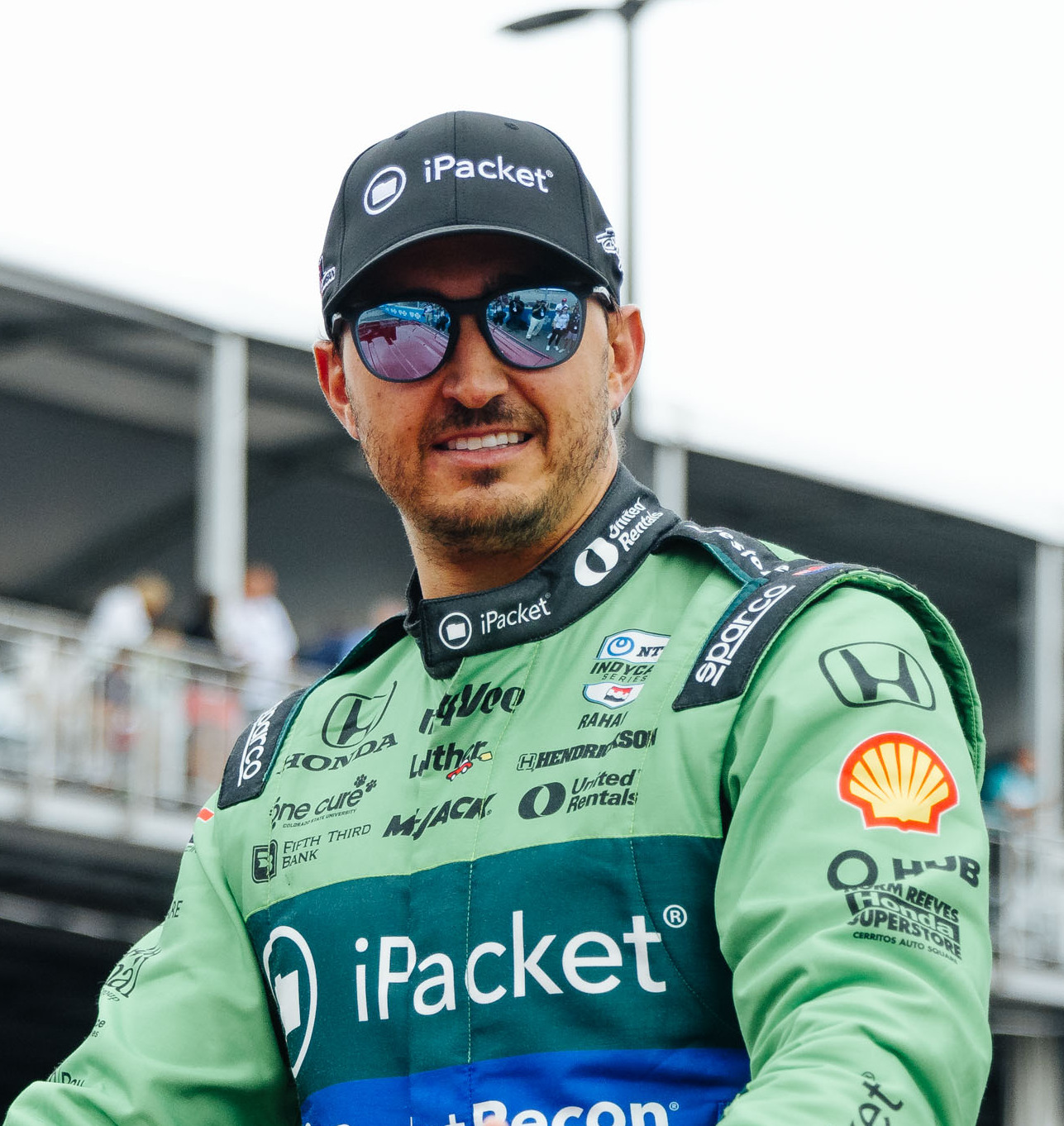
- Rahal at the 2024 Chevrolet Detroit Grand Prix
- Nationality: (United States) American
- Born: Graham Robert Rahal; January 4, 1989 (age 37); New Albany, Ohio, U.S.

IndyCar Series career
- 304 races run over 18 years
- Team: No. 15 (Rahal Letterman Lanigan Racing)
- Best finish: 4th (2015)
- First race: 2008 Honda Grand Prix of St. Petersburg (St. Petersburg)
- Last race: 2026 Mission Grand Prix of Monterey (Laguna Seca)
- First win: 2008 Honda Grand Prix of St. Petersburg (St. Petersburg)
- Last win: 2017 Detroit Grand Prix, Race 2 (Belle Isle)
Wins	Podiums	Poles
6	32	5

Champ Car career
- 15 races run over 1 year
- Years active: 2007
- Team: Newman/Haas/Lanigan Racing
- Best finish: 5th (2007)
- First race: 2007 Vegas Grand Prix (Las Vegas)
- Last race: 2007 Gran Premio Tecate (Mexico City)
Wins	Podiums	Poles
0	4	0
- Relatives: Bobby Rahal (father); Courtney Force (wife); Ashley Force Hood (sister-in-law); Brittany Force (sister-in-law) John Force (father-in-law); Robert Hight (brother-in-law)

Previous series
- 2007 2006 2005: Champ Car World Series; Champ Car Atlantic; Star Mazda Championship

Awards
- 2011: 24 Hours of Daytona winner

Graham Robert Rahal (/ˈreɪhɔːl/ RAY-hawl; born January 4, 1989) is an American racing driver and businessman. He currently races in the IndyCar Series for Rahal Letterman Lanigan Racing, a team partially owned by his father Bobby Rahal, the winner of the 1986 Indianapolis 500.

== Racing career ==
=== Early racing ===
In 2005, Rahal won the Formula Atlantic class at the SCCA Runoffs and finished fourth in Star Mazda Series standings. After the season concluded, Rahal raced with A1 Team Lebanon for the final three rounds of 2005-06 A1 Grand Prix season.

He moved to a full-time ride in the Champ Car Atlantic Series in 2006, where he won five races and finished second in the season standings. He also drove in the Indy Pro Series event on the Indianapolis Motor Speedway road course in conjunction with the 2006 United States Grand Prix and finished second.

Rahal would once again jump in A1GP's Team Lebanon car for one race in the second round of the 2006-07 A1 Grand Prix season. SpeedTV reported in August 2006 that Rahal would drive for Newman/Haas Racing in the Champ Car World Series in 2007.

=== 2007 ===
On January 27, 2007, Rahal drove in the 24 Hours of Daytona. One of four drivers of the Southard Motorsports Lexus Riley, the car ran into trouble early and finished 62nd out of seventy entries.

On March 18, he drove in the 12 Hours of Sebring American Le Mans Series race for his father's Rahal Letterman Racing team. He drove a Porsche 911 GT3-RSR with two other drivers, finishing sixth in the GT2 class and fifteenth overall.

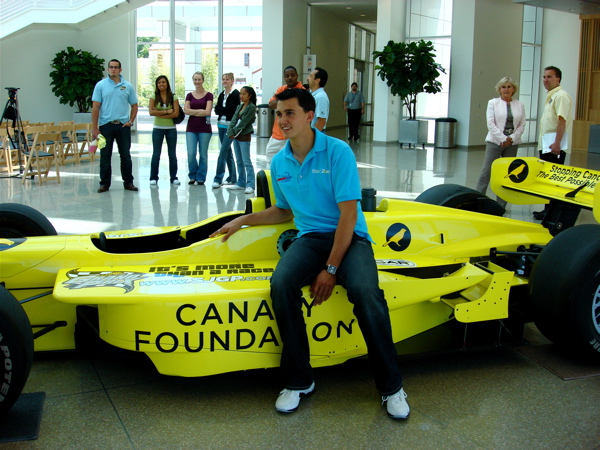
Rahal posing with the Canary Foundation show car for the 2007 San Jose Grand Prix

On March 27, news reports from the previous summer were confirmed. It was announced he would be the second driver for Newman/Haas/Lanigan Racing in the Champ Car World Series and drove the No. 2 Panoz DP01 sponsored by MEDI|ZONE alongside his teammate, three-time series champion Sébastien Bourdais.

On April 8, in his debut in the Champ Car World Series at the Vegas Grand Prix, Rahal hit the wall on the front stretch on the first lap and retired from the race. On April 15 at the Toyota Grand Prix of Long Beach, he finished his first Champ Car race, ending up eighth. On April 22, in just his third Champ Car race, he became the youngest ever podium finisher in Champ Car history after finishing second in Houston. Rahal completed his rookie season in fifth place in series points with four podium finishes, but was still without a race win.

=== 2008 ===
With the creation of a single American open-wheel racing series for 2008, Rahal and the Newman/Haas/Lanigan team became part of the IndyCar Series, including Rahal's first Indianapolis 500.

Rahal missed the Gainsco Auto Insurance Indy 300 due to a crash in testing, after which his team could not get his car repaired in time for the race. He made his series debut at the second race of the season, the Honda Grand Prix of St. Petersburg and despite an early spin in the race, Rahal won the race by 3.5192 seconds from the two-time defending winner of the race, Hélio Castroneves.

He became the youngest person at the time to win a major American open-wheel race – aged 19 years, 93 days – and the fourth to win in his first appearance in the IndyCar Series. The best finish Rahal would manage the rest of the year was a pair of eighth place finishes at Watkins Glen and Sonoma; he finished seventeenth in points, fourth among series rookies.

=== 2009 ===
Rahal returned to Newman/Haas/Lanigan for the 2009 IndyCar Series, taking over the No. 02 car with McDonald's as his sponsor. He began the season by taking pole at St. Petersburg, his first in his IndyCar career, thus becoming the youngest ever polesitter at age 20 years, 90 days. This was the first time a Rahal had won an IndyCar pole since his father started first at Toronto in 1992, which was Bobby's third in a row that season.

He finished seventh in the race after damaging the car in a first-lap crash. His season was also undermined by bad relations with his teammate Robert Doornbos – when Doornbos left midseason, Rahal commented "We could certainly have a second driver who is more of a team player." He finished the season 7th in points with two podium finishes.

Rahal was linked with the US F1 Team, the American-based Formula One team, that was set to debut in the 2010 World Championship. The team's sporting director, Peter Windsor, mentioned Rahal as a potential candidate for a seat with the Charlotte-based outfit. However, Windsor later decided against hiring either Rahal or Marco Andretti due to fears that they would not be able to get their FIA Super Licences in time for the 2010 season. Eventually, the team failed to compete in the 2010 Formula One season, with the team ultimately folding and banned from participating in any FIA-sanctioned championship.

=== 2010 ===
Rahal did not return to Newman/Haas/Lanigan Racing for the 2010 IndyCar Series, due to McDonald's discontinuing their sponsorship to focus on the 2010 Winter Olympics.

On March 10, 2010, Sarah Fisher Racing announced Rahal would pilot Fisher's No. 67 Dollar General car in the first two North American events of 2010, the Honda Grand Prix of St. Petersburg and the Indy Grand Prix of Alabama. Fisher was originally planning on driving in the races herself, in addition to seven oval races, before deciding that putting Rahal in the car could be a benefit to everyone, including Dollar General, who are based in Goodlettsville, Tennessee. On April 6, 2010, Sarah Fisher Racing announced the addition of the Grand Prix of Long Beach to Rahal's schedule. In those races, Rahal finished ninth, seventeenth, and 22nd (retired) respectively.

After the Grand Prix of Long Beach, Rahal was signed to drive for his father's team, Rahal Letterman Racing, in the 2010 Indianapolis 500. Rahal qualified in the seventh position for the race and finished twelfth. On June 10, 2010, Dreyer & Reinbold Racing announced the signing of Rahal for the Iowa Corn Indy 250 at Iowa Speedway, filling in for the injured Mike Conway in the No. 24 entry on a one-off basis.

Rahal returned to Newman/Haas Racing for six of the remaining 8 races of the 2010 season, starting with Toronto, and returned to Sarah Fisher Racing for the Kentucky Speedway race. Rahal's 2010 totals included twelve starts for four teams and a twentieth-place finish in points.

On October 10, 2010, Rahal finished runner-up at the RoboPong 200 all-star kart event at the New Castle Motorsports Park with teammate Conor Daly.

=== 2011–2012 ===
Rahal signed to drive the No. 38 car for Chip Ganassi Racing with a Service Central sponsorship beginning in 2011 as the team expanded from two to four cars and continued with the team into 2012.

Rahal co-drove the No. 01 TELMEX/Target Chip Ganassi Racing with Felix Sabates car to victory in the Rolex 24 at Daytona along with Scott Pruett, Memo Rojas, and Joey Hand. It came thirty years after his father, Bobby, won the race, partnering with Brian Redman and Bob Garretson.

=== 2013–2023 ===
From 2013 onwards, Rahal returned to his father's team, Rahal Letterman Lanigan Racing. While a second-place finish at the 2013 Long Beach Grand Prix showed promise early in the season, 2013 would be a building year for the new partnership.

In 2015 brought great results for Rahal with three podiums in the first half of the season; second at Barber Motorsports Park, second at the 2015 Grand Prix of Indianapolis, and a third at the Sunday race in Detroit.

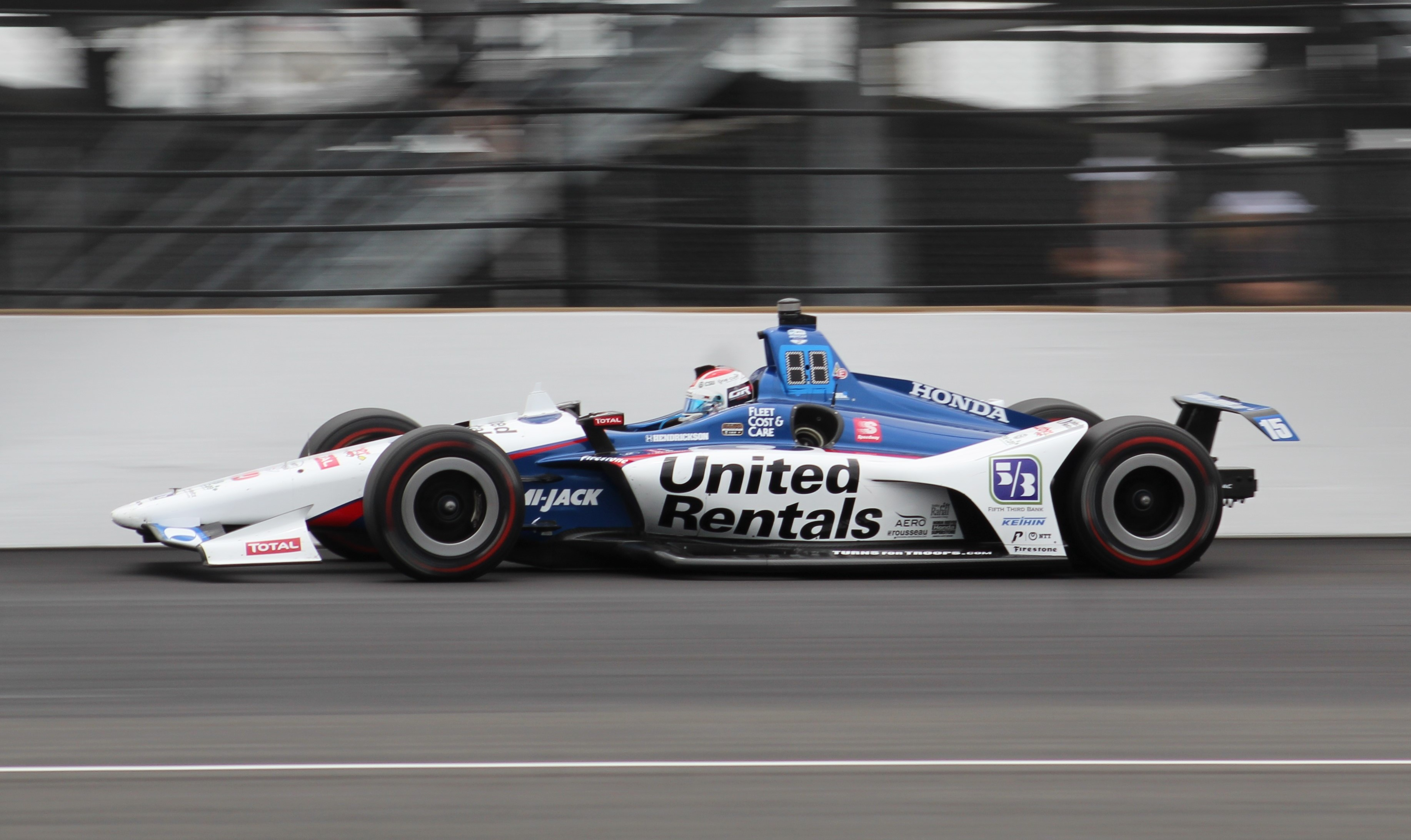
Graham Rahal driving at the 2019 Indianapolis 500.

In 2015 season, Rahal broke a 6+ year winless streak by winning the 2015 MAVTV 500 at Auto Club Speedway in Fontana, CA. Rahal won later in the season at the 2015 Honda Indy 200 at Mid-Ohio. The win was especially poignant for Rahal since he grew up in Ohio and also put Rahal in the championship hunt for the first time in his career. Rahal ended finishing fourth in the standings after a disappointing performance in the last two races.

In 2016 brought another win to Rahal's almost decade-long IndyCar career after winning the 2016 Firestone 600 at Texas Motor Speedway. The margin of victory was only .008 of a second, the fifth-closest finish in IndyCar history.

In 2017, Rahal had six top-five finishes, down from eight top-five finishes in both 2015 and 2016, but he did pick up wins in both races at the Detroit Grand Prix (June 3 and 4).

In 2018, Rahal scored a best finish of second at the streets of St. Petersburg and finished the championship eighth overall.

In 2019 marked the fifth-straight year Rahal finished in the top-ten for the IndyCar Series championship, finishing eighth overall with his best finish being third Texas Motor Speedway.

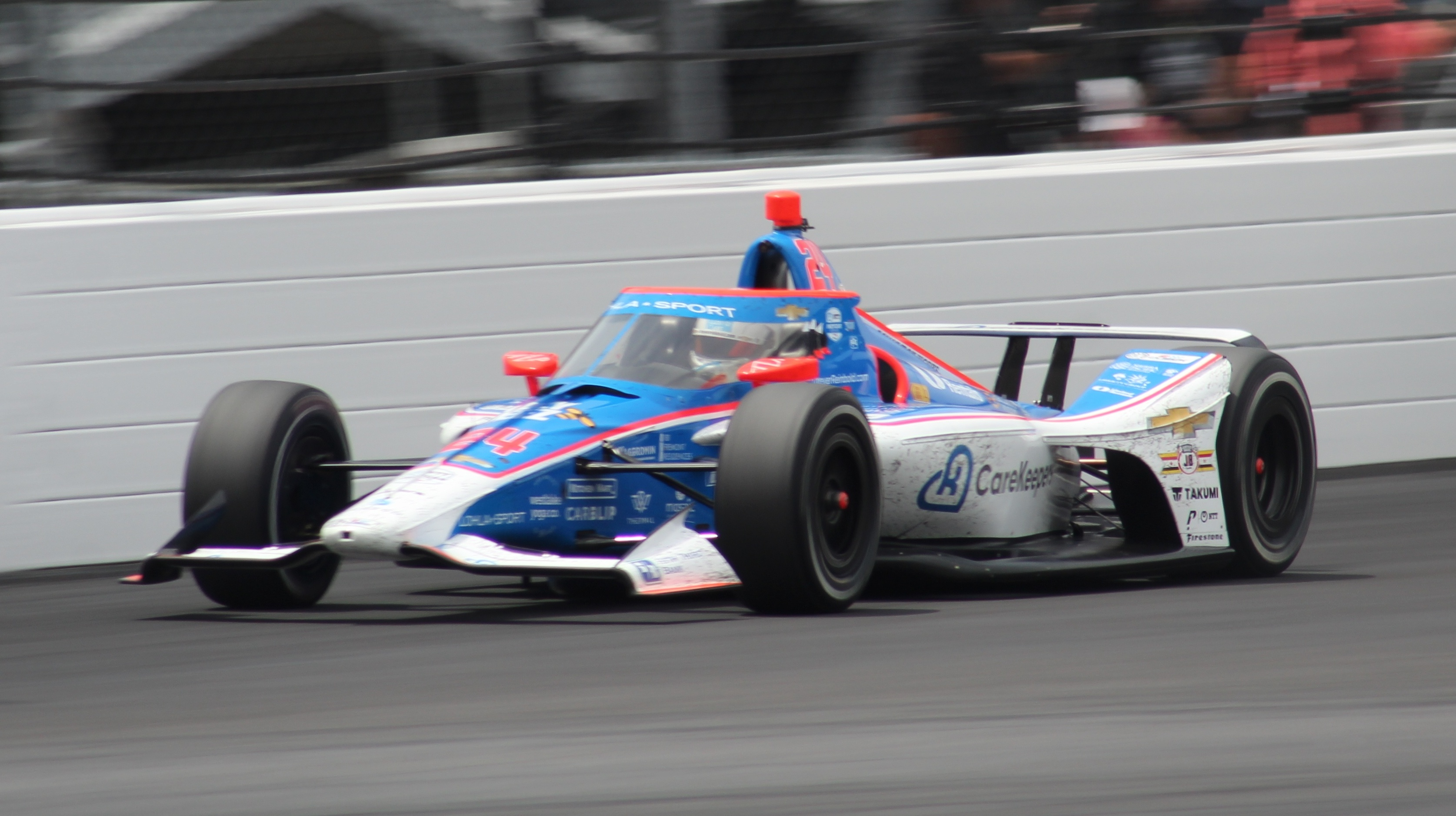
Rahal during the 2023 Indianapolis 500

Rahal finished second at the 2020 Indianapolis Grand Prix before earning two third place finishes at the second Iowa race and the Indianapolis 500 to finish sixth in the points

In 2021, he would only score one podium at Texas Motor Speedway to finish seventh in the points, and in 2022, he would finish eleventh in points with a best finish of fourth at Toronto, marking the first year since 2014 that he had finished outside the top-ten in points.

In 2023, Rahal initially appeared to miss out the Indianapolis 500 after teammate Jack Harvey bumped him out of the field in the last chance qualifying session. However, after Stefan Wilson was ruled out due to an injury after a crash in practice, Rahal was chosen as the replacement driver for the #24 Dreyer & Reinbold Racing / Cusick Motorsports Chevrolet. Rahal finished five laps down in 22nd in the race after being involved in an earlier accident. However, after the Indy 50, Rahal experienced a rebound in performance, taking pole positions at the second race on the IMS Road Course and at Portland and picking up his first podium on a road course in years.

== Business interests ==
Rahal is owner of Graham Rahal Brands (GR Brands) which operates Graham Rahal Performance (GRP), an exotic car sales, tuning, parts and accessories dealership in Zionsville, Indiana. The company also has Ducati and Piaggio motorcycle dealerships in Indiana and Ohio.

Additionally, Rahal is a junior partner with Bobby Rahal Automotive Group, a network of car dealerships in western and central Pennsylvania.

== Personal life ==
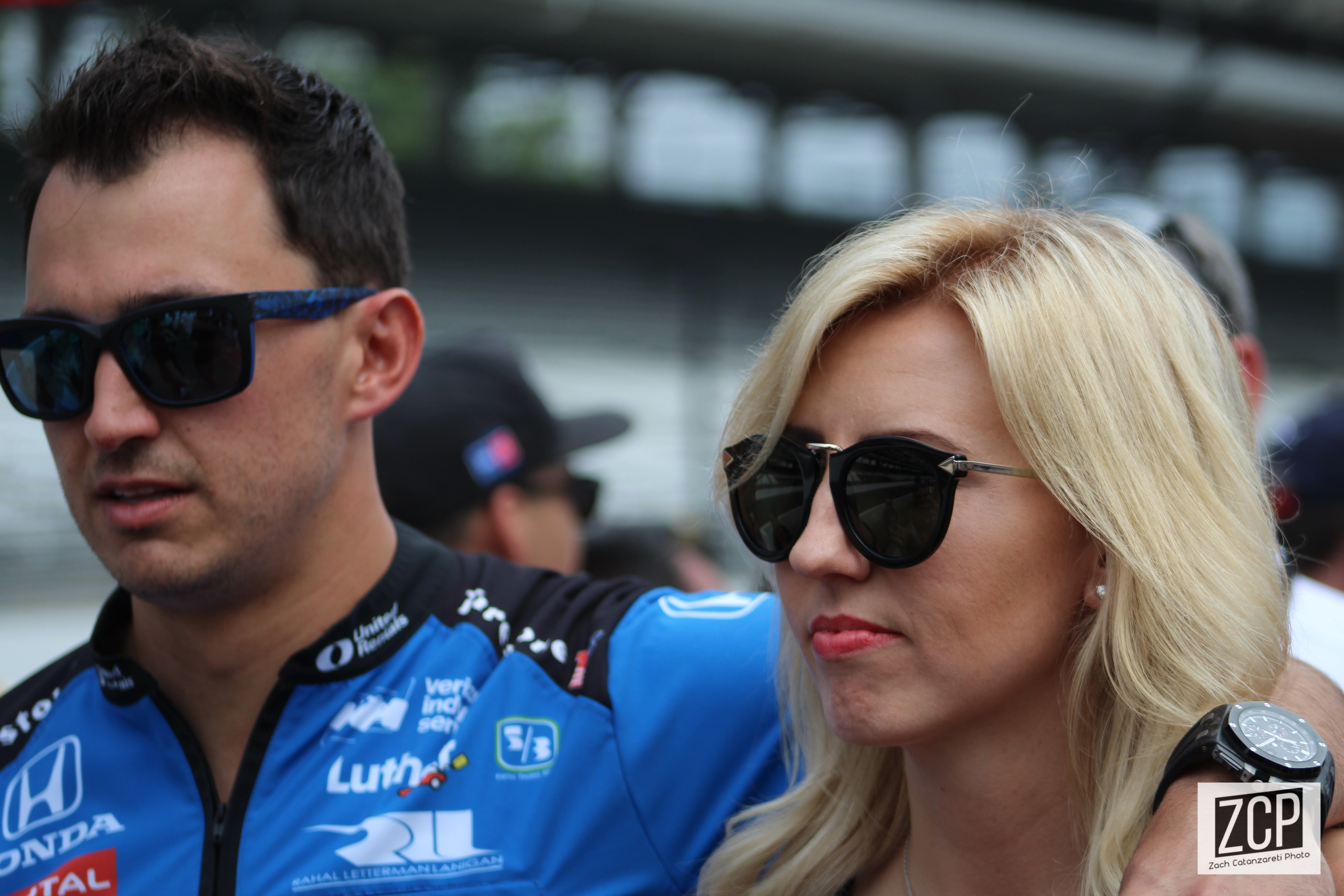
Graham Rahal with wife Courtney Force.

Rahal was born in Columbus, Ohio. He attended New Albany school systems in Ohio and graduated in June 2007 with plans to attend Denison University. Rahal is a die-hard Ohio State fan and enjoys NHL hockey and golf. He is a car enthusiast and owns a growing Ducati collection.

Rahal is married to former NHRA drag racer Courtney Force, daughter of 16-time NHRA drag racing champion and legend John Force. In May 2020, the pair announced they were expecting their first child; in November she gave birth to a daughter, Harlan Ann Rahal.

Rahal started the Graham Rahal Foundation in 2009 to support Alex's Lemonade Stand for Childhood Cancer and The Association of Hole in the Wall Camps (known as SeriousFun Children's Network as of April 2012). In 2019, Rahal and wife Courtney Force took on the foundation in a joint effort, changing the name to Graham & Courtney Rahal Foundation (GCRF). GCRF supports Turns for Troops, benefitting the national nonprofit SoldierStrong, and Colorado State University's One Cure

== Racing record ==
=== Career summary ===
Season	Series	Team name	Races	Wins	Poles	Points	Position
2004	Formula BMW USA	Vitesse Farm Racing	14	0	0	63	7th
2005	Star Mazda Series	Andersen Racing	12	1	0	370	4th
2005–06	A1 Grand Prix	A1 Team Lebanon	6	0	0	0	23rd †
2006	Champ Car Atlantic	Conquest Racing	12	5	0	242	**2nd**
2006	Indy Pro Series	Kenn Hardley Racing	1	0	1	43	28th
2006	American Le Mans Series	Alex Job Racing	1	0	0	12	26th
2006	Rolex 24 at Daytona	Tafel Racing	1	0	1	N/A	16th
2006–07	A1 Grand Prix	A1 Team Lebanon	2	0	0	0	23rd †
2007	Champ Car World Series	Newman/Haas/Lanigan Racing	14	0	0	243	5th
2007	Rolex 24 at Daytona	Southard Motorsports	1	0	0	N/A	28th
2007	American Le Mans Series	Rahal Letterman Racing	2	0	0	31	22nd
2008	IndyCar Series	Newman/Haas/Lanigan Racing	19	1	0	288	17th
2008	Rolex 24 at Daytona	Michael Shank Racing	1	0	0	N/A	6th
2009	IndyCar Series	Newman/Haas/Lanigan Racing	17	0	2	385	7th
2010	IndyCar Series	Sarah Fisher Racing	12	0	0	235	20th
2010	IndyCar Series	Rahal Letterman Racing	12	0	0	235	20th
2010	IndyCar Series	Dreyer & Reinbold Racing	12	0	0	235	20th
2010	IndyCar Series	Newman/Haas Racing	12	0	0	235	20th
2011	IndyCar Series	Chip Ganassi Racing	18	0	0	320	9th
2011	Rolex 24 at Daytona	Chip Ganassi Racing	1	1	0	N/A	**1st**
2012	IndyCar Series	Chip Ganassi Racing	15	0	0	333	10th
2012	Rolex 24 at Daytona	Chip Ganassi Racing	1	0	0	N/A	6th
2012	International V8 Supercars Championship	Kelly Racing	2	0	0	N/A	NC
2013	IndyCar Series	Rahal Letterman Lanigan Racing	19	0	0	319	18th
2014	IndyCar Series	Rahal Letterman Lanigan Racing	18	0	0	345	19th
2014	United SportsCar Championship - GTLM	BMW Team RLL	1	0	0	29	36th
2015	IndyCar Series	Rahal Letterman Lanigan Racing	16	2	0	490	4th
2015	United SportsCar Championship - GTLM	BMW Team RLL	1	0	0	29	23rd
2016	IndyCar Series	Rahal Letterman Lanigan Racing	16	1	0	484	5th
2016	IMSA SportsCar Championship - GTLM	BMW Team RLL	1	0	0	21	30th
2017	IndyCar Series	Rahal Letterman Lanigan Racing	17	2	1	522	6th
2017	IMSA SportsCar Championship - GTD	Michael Shank Racing with Curb-Agajanian	1	0	0	20	68th
2018	IndyCar Series	Rahal Letterman Lanigan Racing	17	0	0	392	8th
2018	IMSA SportsCar Championship - Prototype	Acura Team Penske	3	0	0	64	31st
2019	IndyCar Series	Rahal Letterman Lanigan Racing	17	0	0	389	10th
2019	IMSA SportsCar Championship - DPi	Acura Team Penske	1	0	0	30	30th
2020	IndyCar Series	Rahal Letterman Lanigan Racing	14	0	0	377	6th
2021	IndyCar Series	Rahal Letterman Lanigan Racing	16	0	0	389	7th
2022	IndyCar Series	Rahal Letterman Lanigan Racing	17	0	0	345	11th
2023	IndyCar Series	Rahal Letterman Lanigan Racing	16	0	2	276	15th
2023	IndyCar Series	Dreyer & Reinbold Racing / Cusick Motorsports	1	0	0	276	15th
2024	IndyCar Series	Rahal Letterman Lanigan Racing	17	0	0	251	18th
2025	IndyCar Series	Rahal Letterman Lanigan Racing	17	0	0	260	19th
2026	IndyCar Series	Rahal Letterman Lanigan Racing	18	0	0	302	16th

† Team result
* Season still in progress

=== Complete Formula BMW USA results ===
Year	Team	1	2	3	4	5	6	7	8	9	10	11	12	13	14	Rank	Points
2004	Vitesse Farm Racing	LIM; 1; 10	LIM; 2; 12	CGV; 1; 12	CGV; 2 Ret	IMS; 1; 9	IMS; 2; 10	CLE; 1; 8	CLE; 2; 6	ROA; 1; 4	ROA; 2; 7	DEN; 1; 4	DEN; 2; 3	LAG; 1; 6	LAG; 2; 5	7th	63

=== SCCA National Championship Runoffs ===
Year	Track	Car	Engine	Class	Finish	Start	Status
2005	Mid-Ohio	Swift 014.a	Toyota	Formula Atlantic	1	1	Running

=== Complete A1 Grand Prix results ===
(key) (Races in bold indicate pole position; races in italics indicate fastest lap)

Year	Entrant	1	2	3	4	5	6	7	8	9	10	11	12	13	14	15	16	17	18	19	20	21	22	DC	Points
2005–06	Lebanon	GBR; SPR	GBR; FEA	GER; SPR	GER; FEA	POR; SPR	POR; FEA	AUS; SPR	AUS; FEA	MYS; SPR	MYS; FEA	UAE; SPR	UAE; FEA	RSA; SPR	RSA; FEA	IDN; SPR	IDN; FEA	MEX; SPR; 13	MEX; FEA; 14	USA; SPR; Ret	USA; FEA; Ret	CHN; SPR; 18	CHN; FEA; 11	23rd	0
2006–07	Lebanon	NED; SPR	NED; FEA	CZE; SPR; 12	CZE; FEA; 12	CHN; SPR	CHN; FEA	MYS; SPR	MYS; FEA	IDN; SPR	IDN; FEA	NZL; SPR	NZL; FEA	AUS; SPR	AUS; FEA	RSA; SPR	RSA; FEA	MEX; SPR	MEX; FEA	CHN; SPR	CHN; FEA	GBR; SPR	GBR; SPR	23rd	0

=== American open-wheel racing results ===
(key) (Races in bold indicate pole position, races in italics indicate fastest race lap)

==== Star Mazda Series ====
Year	Team	1	2	3	4	5	6	7	8	9	10	11	12	Rank	Points
2005	Andersen Walko Racing	SEB; 3	ATL; 9	MOH; 10	CGV; 2	PPR; 2	INF; 31	INF; 17	POR; 1	ROA; 31	MOS; 5	ATL; 2	LAG; 3	4th	370

==== Champ Car Atlantic ====
Year	Team	1	2	3	4	5	6	7	8	9	10	11	12	Rank	Points
2006	Mi-Jack Conquest Racing	LBH; 5	HOU; 15	**MTY**; 1	**POR**; 27	CLE1; 1	CLE2; 1	**TOR**; 15	EDM; 2	SJO; 12	**DEN**; 1	MTL; 1	ROA; 20	**2nd**	**242**

==== Indy Pro Series ====
Year	Team	1	2	3	4	5	6	7	8	9	10	11	12	Rank	Points
2006	Kenn Hardley Racing	HMS	STP1	STP2	INDY	WGL	**IMS**; 2	NSH	MIL	KTY	SNM1	SNM2	CHI	**28th**	**43**

==== Champ Car World Series ====
Year	Team	No.	Chassis	Engine	1	2	3	4	5	6	7	8	9	10	11	12	13	14	Rank	Points	Ref
2007	Newman/Haas/Lanigan Racing	2	Panoz DP01	Cosworth XFE	LVG; 17	LBH; 8	HOU; 2	POR; 9	CLE; 8	MTT; 7	TOR; 11	EDM; 3	SJO; 6	ROA; 3	ZOL; 3	ASN; 9	SRF; 11	MXC; 4	**5th**	**243**	

==== IndyCar Series ====
(key)

Year	Team	No.	Chassis	Engine	1	2	3	4	5	6	7	8	9	10	11	12	13	14	15	16	17	18	19	Rank	Pts	Ref
2008	Newman/Haas/Lanigan Racing	06	Dallara IR-05	Honda	HMS	STP; 1	MOT		KAN; 12	INDY; 33	MIL; 25	TXS; 11	IOW; 10	RIR; 18	WGL; 8	NSH; 12	MOH; 16	EDM; 26	KTY; 25	SNM; 8	DET; 13	CHI; 19		17th	288	
2008	Newman/Haas/Lanigan Racing	06	Panoz DP01	Cosworth				LBH; 13																17th	288	
2009	Newman/Haas/Lanigan Racing	02	Dallara IR-05	Honda	**STP**; 7	LBH; 12	**KAN**; 7	INDY; 31	MIL; 4	TXS; 22	IOW; 11	RIR; 3	WGL; 13	TOR; 20	EDM; 7	KTY; 5	MOH; 8	SNM; 21	CHI; 5	MOT; 3	HMS; 11			7th	385	
2010	Sarah Fisher Racing	67	Dallara IR-05	Honda	SAO	STP; 9	ALA; 17	LBH; 22	KAN															20th	235	
2010	Sarah Fisher Racing	66	Dallara IR-05	Honda															KTY; 20					20th	235	
2010	Rahal Letterman Racing	30	Dallara IR-05	Honda						INDY; 12	TXS													20th	235	
2010	Dreyer & Reinbold Racing	24	Dallara IR-05	Honda								IOW; 9	WGL											20th	235	
2010	Newman/Haas Racing	02	Dallara IR-05	Honda										TOR; 5	EDM	MOH; 20	SNM; 9	CHI; 10		MOT; 8	HMS; 10			20th	235	
2011	Chip Ganassi Racing	38	Dallara IR-05	Honda	STP; 17	ALA; 18	LBH; 13	SAO; 2	INDY; 3	TXS; 9	TXS; 30	MIL; 2	IOW; 15	TOR; 13	EDM; 25	MOH; 24	NHM; 26	SNM; 8	BAL; 10	MOT; 12	KTY; 12	LVS^{3} C		9th	320	
2012	Chip Ganassi Racing	38	Dallara DW12	Honda	STP; 12	ALA; 4	LBH; 24	SAO; 16	INDY; 13	DET; 19	TXS; 2	MIL; 9	IOW; 9	TOR; 23	EDM; 4	MOH; 11	SNM; 5	BAL; 11	FON; 6					10th	333	
2013	Rahal Letterman Lanigan Racing	15	Dallara DW12	Honda	STP; 13	ALA; 21	LBH; 2	SAO; 22	INDY; 25	DET; 9	DET; 9	TXS; 21	MIL; 16	IOW; 5	POC; 18	TOR; 20	TOR; 13	MOH; 18	SNM; 11	BAL; 17	HOU; 7	HOU; 18	FON; 15	18th	319	
2014	Rahal Letterman Lanigan Racing	15	Dallara DW12	Honda	STP; 14	LBH; 13	ALA; 17	IMS; 21	INDY; 33	DET; 2	DET; 21	TXS; 12	HOU; 11	HOU; 16	POC; 19	IOW; 7	TOR; 6	TOR; 20	MOH; 5	MIL; 14	SNM; 20	FON; 18		19th	345	
2015	Rahal Letterman Lanigan Racing	15	Dallara DW12	Honda	STP; 11	NLA; 8	LBH; 11	ALA; 2	IMS; 2	INDY; 5	DET; 23	DET; 3	TXS; 15	TOR; 9	FON; 1	MIL; 3	IOW; 4	MOH; 1	POC; 20	SNM; 18				4th	490	
2016	Rahal Letterman Lanigan Racing	15	Dallara DW12	Honda	STP; 16	PHX; 5	LBH; 15	ALA; 2	IMS; 4	INDY; 14	DET; 4	DET; 11	ROA; 3	IOW; 16	TOR; 13	MOH; 4	POC; 11	TXS; 1	WGL; 21	SNM; 2				5th	484	
2017	Rahal Letterman Lanigan Racing	15	Dallara DW12	Honda	STP; 17	LBH; 10	ALA; 13	PHX; 21	IMS; 6	INDY; 12	**DET**; 1	DET; 1	TEX; 4	ROA; 8	IOW; 5	TOR; 9	MOH; 3	POC; 9	GTW; 12	WGL; 5	SNM; 6			6th	522	
2018	Rahal Letterman Lanigan Racing	15	Dallara DW12	Honda	STP; 2	PHX; 9	LBH; 5	ALA; 7	IMS; 9	INDY; 10	DET; 23	DET; 5	TXS; 6	ROA; 6	IOW; 7	TOR; 21	MOH; 9	POC; 14	GTW; 10	POR; 23	SNM; 23			8th	392	
2019	Rahal Letterman Lanigan Racing	15	Dallara DW12	Honda	STP; 12	COA; 4	ALA; 23	LBH; 4	IMS; 9	INDY; 27	DET; 7	DET; 7	TXS; 3	RDA; 4	TOR; 9	IOW; 8	MOH; 9	POC; 9	GTW; 18	POR; 23	LAG; 12			10th	389	
2020	Rahal Letterman Lanigan Racing	15	Dallara DW12	Honda	TXS; 17	IMS; 2	ROA; 7	ROA; 23	IOW; 12	IOW; 3	INDY; 3	GTW; 18	GTW; 20	MOH; 4	MOH; 4	IMS; 7	IMS; 7	STP; 9						6th	377	
2021	Rahal Letterman Lanigan Racing	15	Dallara DW12	Honda	ALA; 7	STP; 15	TXS; 5	TXS; 3	IMS; 5	INDY; 32	DET; 5	DET; 5	ROA; 11	MOH; 6	NSH; 5	IMS; 7	GTW; 23	POR; 10*	LAG; 4	LBH; 16				7th	389	
2022	Rahal Letterman Lanigan Racing	15	Dallara DW12	Honda	STP; 7	TXS; 22	LBH; 7	ALA; 8	IMS; 16	INDY; 14	DET; 26	ROA; 8	MOH; 12	TOR; 4	IOW; 9	IOW; 14	IMS; 7	NSH; 23	GTW; 10	POR; 5	LAG; 18			11th	345	
2023	Rahal Letterman Lanigan Racing	15	Dallara DW12	Honda	STP; 6	TXS; 24	LBH; 12	ALA; 17	IMS; 10	INDY; DNQ	DET; 25	ROA; 11	MOH; 7	TOR; 9	IOW; 28	IOW; 20	NSH; 15	**IMS**; 2*	GTW; 20	**POR**; 12	LAG; 27			15th	276	
2023	Dreyer & Reinbold Racing Cusick Motorsports	24	Dallara DW12	Chevrolet						INDY; 22														15th	276	
2024	Rahal Letterman Lanigan Racing	15	Dallara DW12	Honda	STP; 14	THE; 11	LBH; 17	ALA; 11	IMS; 9	INDY; 15	DET; 15	ROA; 10	LAG; 24	MOH; 18	IOW; 16	IOW; 8	TOR; 10	GTW; 23	POR; 9	MIL; 20	MIL; 23	NSH; 23		18th	251	
2025	Rahal Letterman Lanigan Racing	15	Dallara DW12	Honda	STP; 12	THE; 11	LBH; 22	ALA; 14	IMS; 6*	INDY; 17	DET; 20	GTW; 22	ROA; 20	MOH; 24	IOW; 11	IOW; 19	TOR; 7	LAG; 12	POR; 4	MIL; 24	NSH; 22			19th	260	
2026	Rahal Letterman Lanigan Racing	15	Dallara DW12	Honda	STP; 18	PHX; 9	ARL; 18	ALA; 3	LBH; 8	IMS; 3	INDY; 20	DET; 3	GTW; 23	ROA; 23	MOH; 12	NSH; 19	POR; 23	MRK; 9	WSH; 13	MIL; 23	MIL; 22	LAG; 19		16th	302	

* Season still in progress.

- ^{1} The Las Vegas Indy 300 was abandoned after Dan Wheldon died from injuries sustained in a 15-car crash on lap 11.

Years	Teams	Races	Poles	Wins	Top 5s	Top 10s	Indianapolis 500 wins	Championships
18	5	304	5	6	51	153	0	0

==== Indianapolis 500 ====
Year	Chassis	Engine	Start	Finish	Team
2008	Dallara	Honda	13	33	Newman/Haas/Lanigan Racing
2009	Dallara	Honda	4	31	Newman/Haas/Lanigan Racing
2010	Dallara	Honda	7	12	Rahal Letterman Racing
2011	Dallara	Honda	30	3	Chip Ganassi Racing
2012	Dallara	Honda	12	13	Chip Ganassi Racing
2013	Dallara	Honda	26	25	Rahal Letterman Lanigan Racing
2014	Dallara	Honda	20	33	Rahal Letterman Lanigan Racing
2015	Dallara	Honda	17	5	Rahal Letterman Lanigan Racing
2016	Dallara	Honda	26	14	Rahal Letterman Lanigan Racing
2017	Dallara	Honda	14	12	Rahal Letterman Lanigan Racing
2018	Dallara	Honda	30	10	Rahal Letterman Lanigan Racing
2019	Dallara	Honda	17	27	Rahal Letterman Lanigan Racing
2020	Dallara	Honda	8	3	Rahal Letterman Lanigan Racing
2021	Dallara	Honda	18	32	Rahal Letterman Lanigan Racing
2022	Dallara	Honda	21	14	Rahal Letterman Lanigan Racing
2023	Dallara	Honda	DNQ		Rahal Letterman Lanigan Racing
2023	Dallara	Chevrolet	33	22	Dreyer & Reinbold Racing/Cusick Motorsports
2024	Dallara	Honda	33	15	Rahal Letterman Lanigan Racing
2025	Dallara	Honda	28	17	Rahal Letterman Lanigan Racing
2026	Dallara	Honda	28	20	Rahal Letterman Lanigan Racing

=== IMSA SportsCar Championship ===
(key) (Races in bold indicate pole position)

Year	Entrant	Class	Make	Engine	1	2	3	4	5	6	7	8	9	10	11	12	Rank	Points	Ref
2014	BMW Team RLL	GTLM	BMW Z4 GTE	BMW 4.4 L V8	DAY; 4	SEB	LBH	LGA	WGL	MOS	IMS	ELK	VIR	AUS	ATL		30th	29	
2015	BMW Team RLL	GTLM	BMW Z4 GTE	BMW 4.4 L V8	DAY; 4	SEB	LBH	LGA	WGL	MOS	ELK	VIR	COA	PET			23rd	29	
2016	BMW Team RLL	GTLM	BMW M6 GTLM	BMW 4.4 L V8	DAY; 11	SEB	LBH	LGA	WGL	MOS	LRP	ELK	VIR	COA	PET		30th	21	
2017	Michael Shank Racing with Curb-Agajanian	GTD	Acura NSX GT3	Acura 3.5 L Turbo V6	DAY; 11	SEB	LBH	COA	DET	WGL	MOS	LIM	ELK	VIR	LGA	PET	68th	20	
2018	Acura Team Penske	P	Acura ARX-05	Acura AR35TT 3.5 L Turbo V6	DAY; 9	SEB; 15	LBH	MOH	DET	WGL	MOS	ELK	LGA	PET; 5			31st	64	
2019	Acura Team Penske	DPi	Acura ARX-05	Acura AR35TT 3.5 L Turbo V6	DAY	SEB	LBH	MOH	DET	WGL	MOS	ELK	LGA	PET; 3			30th	30	
