= Dreyer & Reinbold Racing =

Racing team

(United States) Dreyer & Reinbold Racing
- Owner: Vacant
- Base: Carmel, Indiana, U.S.
- Series: IndyCar Series; Nitrocross
- Race drivers: IndyCar Series: 24. (United States) Conor Daly; Nitrocross Group E 4. (Sweden) Robin Larsson; 14. (Norway) Andreas Bakkerud; 57. (United States) Lia Block; 35. (Jamaica) Fraser McConnell
- Manufacturer: IndyCar Series: Chevrolet (2012-2026); Honda (2027 onwards); Nitrocross: Dodge

Career
- Drivers' Championships: Total: 3 Global RallyCross Championship: 1 Nitrocross: 2
- Race victories: Total: 33; Indycar: 1 Nitrocross: 21; Global RallyCross Championship: 8 Americas RallyCross Championship: 3
- Pole positions: Indycar: 2

Dreyer & Reinbold Racing is an American automotive racing organization that competes in the IndyCar Series and Nitrocross. The team was founded by Indianapolis BMW, Infiniti, Volkswagen, MINI, and Subaru dealer Dennis Reinbold. The team is named in part for Reinbold's grandfather Floyd "Pop" Dreyer, a sidecar racer and race car constructor.

== IndyCar history ==
=== 2000–2006 ===
Founded in 2000, DRR was one of the few teams that consistently ran the Infiniti engine until they left the series, switched to Chevrolet, and finally to Honda in 2005. When Robbie Buhl retired from the cockpit in 2004, he placed Felipe Giaffone in the cockpit, followed by Roger Yasukawa with financial backing from Honda.

With Honda backing gone for 2006, some doubted if the team would continue, as Buhl had consistently stated that if running the team did not make financial sense, he would shut it down. However, sponsorship was found and the team named 2000 series champion Buddy Lazier their primary driver.

In 2002, the team ran a second car for Sarah Fisher, who became the first woman in North American motorsports history to win the pole position for a major-league open-wheel race, earning the pole at Kentucky Speedway. In the 2006 Indianapolis 500, the team's second car was driven by Al Unser Jr.

The team's only win came in their debut race, 2000 IRL season opener at Walt Disney World Speedway, when Buhl stunned the series with a win from the 22nd starting position. In 2006 the team scored their best finish in years when Ryan Briscoe showed great speed in the wet conditions at Watkins Glen International to get on the podium. During that time, other stellar results in season were rare, if not infrequent.

=== 2007–2009 ===
For 2007, the team recruited two ex-Fernandez Racing engineers and added a new sponsor. On January 31, 2007, the 2004 Indianapolis 500 winner Buddy Rice and Sarah Fisher would drive for the team. Rice brought in respectable performances, finishing 9th in points with three top-five finishes. Fisher struggled to place 17th place in points after playing secondary role to the "A Team," often being given inferior equipment. Subsequently, Fisher announced in late 2007 that she would leave the team due to a lack of commitment on the part of DRR.

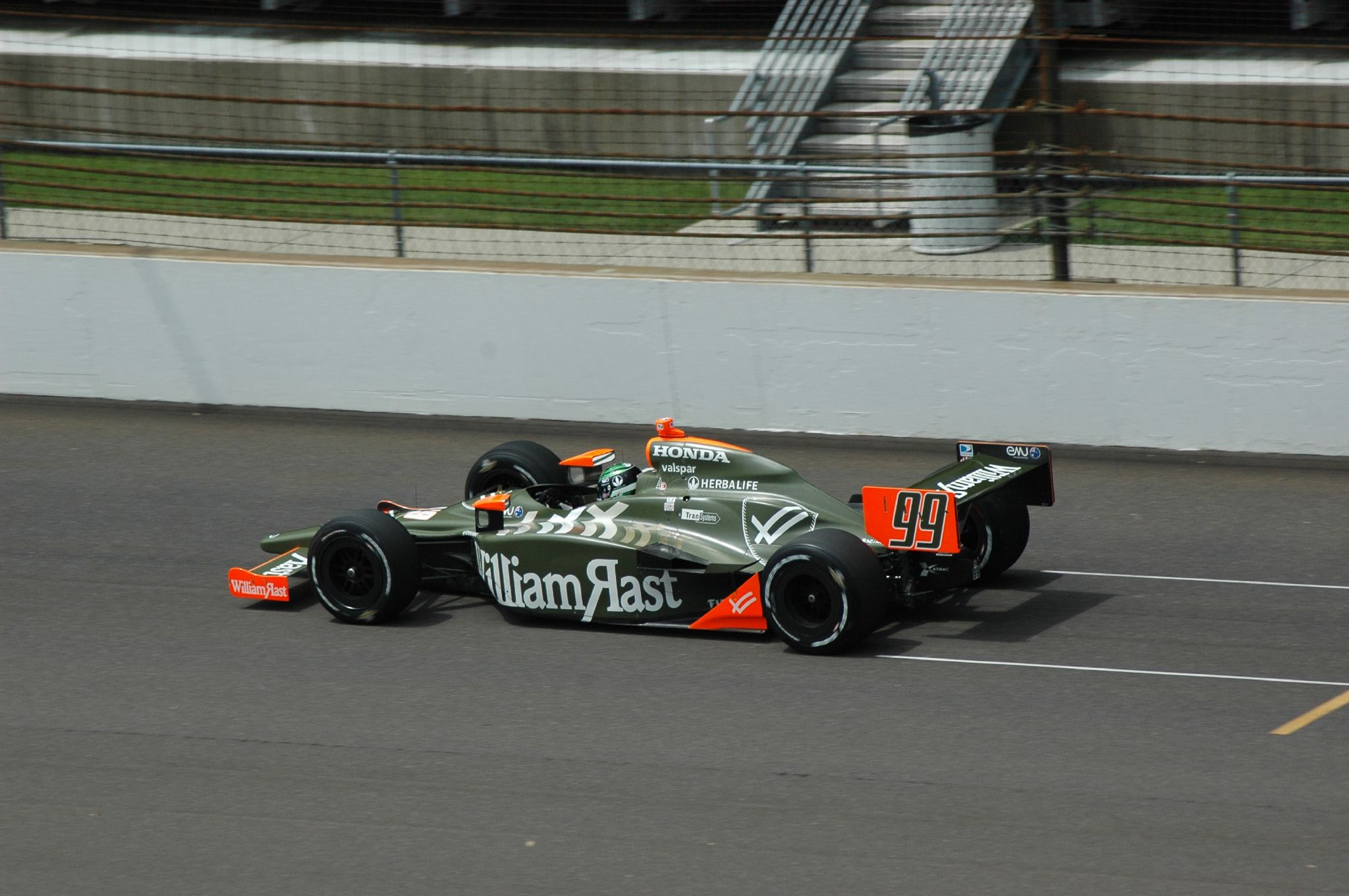
Townsend Bell at the 2008 Indianapolis 500

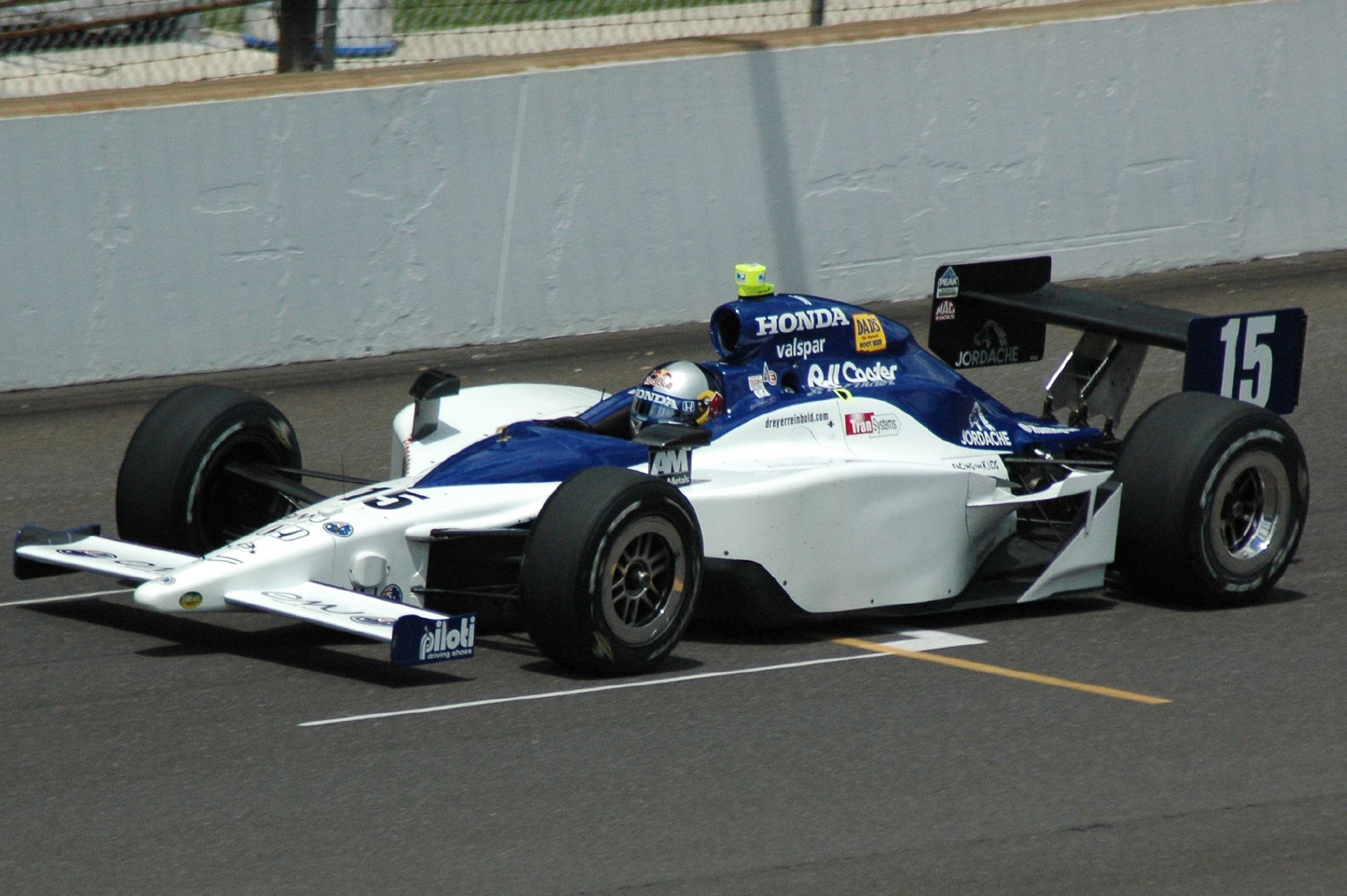
The team's No. 15 car driven by Buddy Rice in practice for the 2008 Indianapolis 500

Rice returned to the team in 2008 while the team's second car was shared by Milka Duno and Townsend Bell. All three of these drivers competed in the 2008 Indianapolis 500. Both Rice and Bell finished in the top-10 (8th and 10th respectively) while Duno finished 19th in the race. For the season, Rice finished 16th in points with a best finish of fourth at Watkins Glen.

The 2009 season saw Dreyer & Reinbold bring on a completely new driver lineup. Joining the team full-time was British rookie Mike Conway, who had previously competed in the GP2 Series. A second full-time entry was shared between Darren Manning (two races), Milka Duno, and Tomas Scheckter. In addition, Roger Yasukawa also returned to the team for the race at Twin Ring Motegi. The team also fielded cars for Richard Petty Motorsports driven by John Andretti, and for Kingdom Racing and driver Davey Hamilton in the 2009 Indianapolis 500.

The cars of Duno, Andretti, and Conway all struggled to qualify for the 2009 Indianapolis 500, but made the field on bump day, the final day of qualifications. Conway, Andretti, and Duno were the last-placed cars running at the finish in the 18th, 19th, and 20th positions respectively. Throughout the rest of the season, Conway struggled for consistency, only finishing nine of the seventeen races, but was fast occasionally on the road courses, finishing on the podium in third place at Infineon Raceway.

=== 2010–2011 ===
Justin Wilson at the 2010 São Paulo Indy 300

Mike Conway at the 2009 Indy Grand Prix of Sonoma

On February 2, 2010, it was announced that Justin Wilson would be joining Dreyer & Reinbold Racing for the 2010 IndyCar season. He would be driving the No. 22 Z-Line Designs car. Wilson was slotted to partner with returning driver Mike Conway throughout the season

For the opening race in Brazil, they were joined by Ana Beatriz. For the 94th running of the Indianapolis 500 the team was expanded to four cars to include Tomas Scheckter and Ana Beatriz. After Conway was sidelined for an accident in the closing stages of the Indy 500, Wilson was partnered with Tomas Scheckter, Graham Rahal and Paul Tracy.

It was announced that Wilson would be joined by J. R. Hildebrand who would be making his Indycar debut at Mid-Ohio. The Toronto event was Wilson's breakthrough event of the season, after being in the top two in each of the three practice sessions, he dominated qualifying. Wilson made it to the Firestone Fast Six shootout without using a single set of the faster red-walled (alternate compound) tires, and easily took the pole after posting a record lap time of 1:00.2710s. Wilson went on to lead much of the race; however, after losing grip coming off of turn 11 on a restart late in the race, his car spun and relinquished the lead to Will Power. Even after Wilson found himself pointing the wrong way in turn 8, he was able to rebound with a seventh-place finish.

After healing from his Indy 500 racing accident, Conway left DRR for Andretti Autosport for the 2011 IndyCar season and was replaced by rookie Ana Beatriz and her sponsor Petroleo Ipiranga. On November 11, 2010 an announcement was made confirming Wilson would remain with Dreyer & Reinbold for a second year.

=== 2012–2013 ===
On November 17, 2011, Dreyer & Reinbold Racing and Group Lotus PLC announced that DRR would serve as a Lotus factory partner team. Additionally, the historic auto manufacturer provided DRR entries with its new Lotus IndyCar V-6 racing engine for the 2012 IndyCar season. On January 17, 2012, the team announced Oriol Servia as the team's full-time entry

On April 23, Dreyer & Reinbold and Lotus mutually agreed to end their existing engine contract. Subsequently, on May 7, the team announced a strategic alliance with Panther Racing to provide technical support as well as the use of the second Chevrolet engine contract held by Panther. The team's performance dramatically improved, with back-to-back top-5 finishes at Indy and Detroit. Servia would finish the season with 3 more top 10s, eventually finishing the season 13th in points.

Dreyer & Reinbold Racing continued their partnership with Panther Racing for the 2013 season with driver Oriol Servia; however, the team decided to withdraw from the 2013 season after the Indianapolis 500 due to lack of sponsorship. The decision did not affect Panther Racing.

=== 2014–2026: Part-time team ===
Ryan Hunter-Reay at 2023 Indianapolis 500

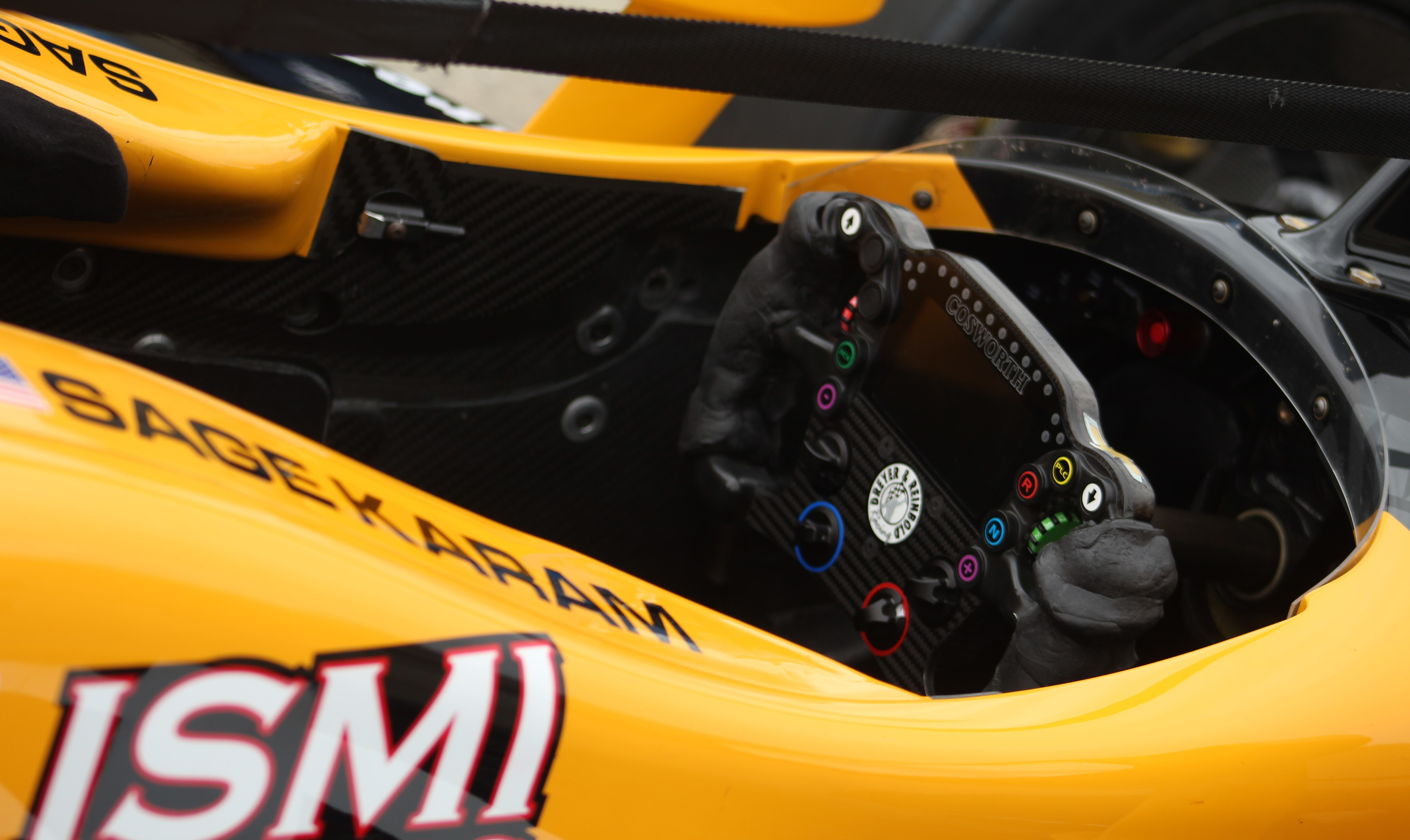
Sage Karam's steering wheel at the 2019 Indy 500.

After the 2013 Indianapolis 500, the team cut its staff and pulled out of IndyCar competition due to losing its primary sponsorship. The team made its return in the 2014 Indianapolis 500 with the help of Kingdom Racing and driver Sage Karam. Despite starting 31st, Karam would ultimately finish 9th. Townsend Bell was another Dreyer & Reinbold Kingdom Racing driver in the 2015 Indianapolis 500 where he finished 14th. Sage Karam returned for the 2016 Indianapolis 500; however, he crashed midway through the race.

In 2017, Karam drove for Dreyer & Reinbold Kingdom Racing at the Indianapolis 500, retiring with mechanical problems. In addition, Reinbold became a technical partner of Harding Racing, who entered Gabby Chaves to compete at the three 500 mile races.

In 2018 and 2019, Dreyer & Reinbold entered both Karam and J. R. Hildebrand. The best finish they would manage would be 11th by Hildebrand in 2018.

On January 7, 2020, Dreyer & Reinbold announced that they would be expanding their race schedule to at least four races. These races included the Firestone Grand Prix of St. Petersburg, GMR Grand Prix, Indianapolis 500, and Honda Indy Toronto. Karam drove all four races while Hildebrand returned for the Indianapolis 500.

After a battle with cancer, Dennis Reinbold died in June 2026.

=== 2026–present: Return to full time and Honda reunion from 2027 ===
In July 2026, Dreyer & Reinbold Racing purchased a charter from Rahal Letterman Lanigan Racing and will return to full time IndyCar competition in 2027.

== Rallycross ==
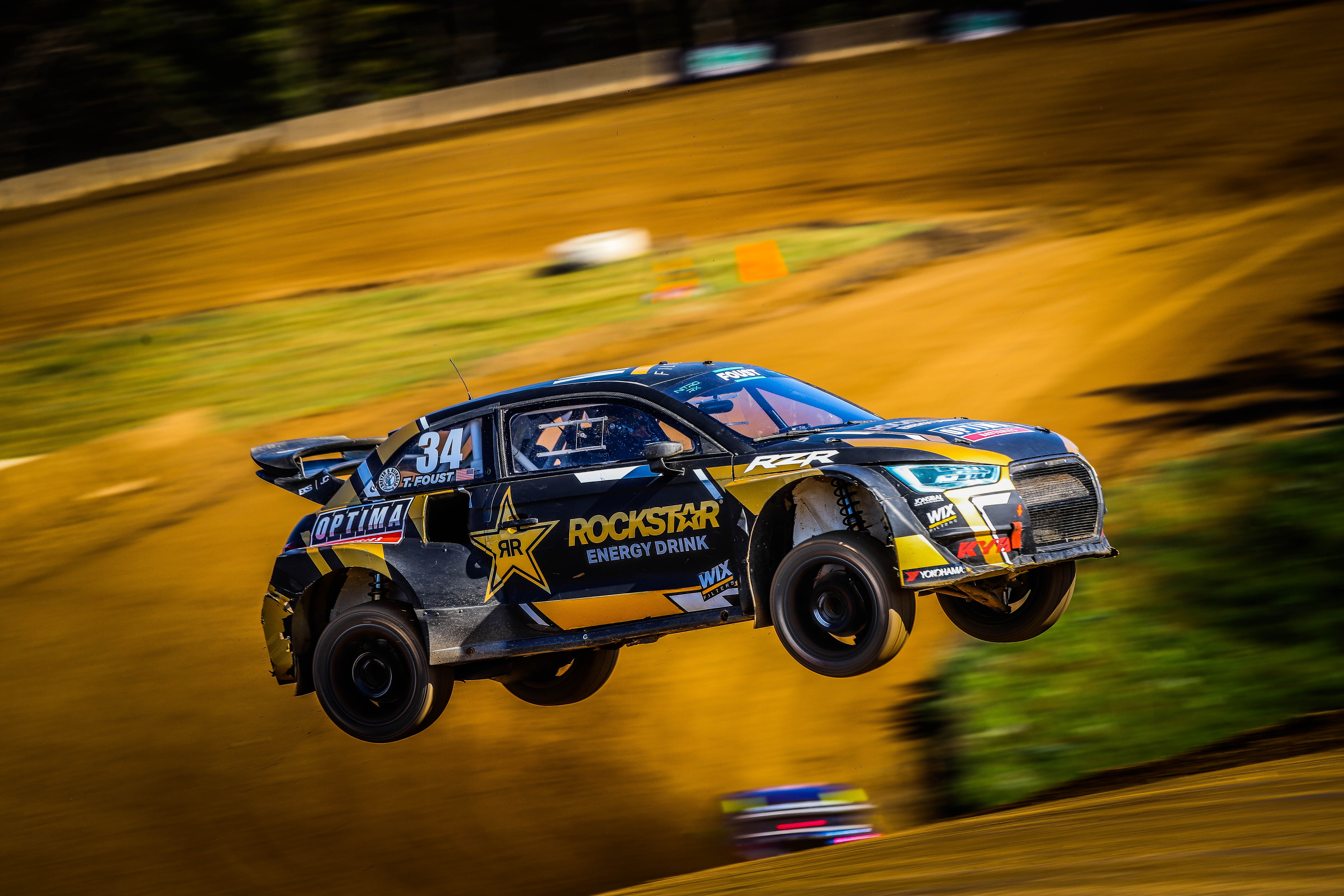
A DRR entry driven by Tanner Foust

Dreyer & Reinbold Racing debuted in rallycross in 2016 by entering the Global RallyCross Championship, where Cabot Bigham was the GRC Lites champion. In 2017, Christian Brooks finished second and Travis PeCoy finished third. The team switched to the new Americas Rallycross Championship in 2018, where Christian Brooks was runner-up in the ARX2 class. In 2021, Cole Keatts was runner-up and Conner Martell was third, meanwhile Sage Karam claimed a win and four runner-up finishes in a part-time ARX2 entry.

In 2021, DRR signed a partnership with KYB EKS JC to compete in Nitro Rallycross. For the 2022–23 season, the team allied with JC Raceteknik and expanded to a four-car program in NRX's Group E class. Robin Larsson won the championship with their two other full-time drivers, Andreas Bakkerud and Fraser McConnell, came in second and third. Additionally, the Dreyer & Reinbold Racing JC team handily won the team championship.

== Drivers ==
- (United States) John Andretti (2009)
- (United States) Townsend Bell (2008, 2015)
- (Brazil) Ana Beatriz (2010–2011)
- (Australia) Ryan Briscoe (2006)
- (United States) Jeff Bucknum (2005)
- (United States) Robbie Buhl (2000–2004)
- (United Kingdom) Mike Conway (2009–2010)
- (Venezuela) Milka Duno (2008–2009)
- (United States) Santino Ferrucci (2022)
- (United States) Sarah Fisher (2002–2003, 2006–2007)
- (Brazil) Felipe Giaffone (2004)
- (Mexico) Memo Gidley (2002)
- (United States) Davey Hamilton (2009, 2011)
- (United States) J. R. Hildebrand (2010, 2018–2019)
- (United States) Ryan Hunter-Reay (2023–2025)
- (United States) Conor Daly (2024)
- (United States) Sage Karam (2014; 2016–2022)
- (United States) Steve Knapp (2000)
- (United States) Buddy Lazier (2004, 2006)
- (United Kingdom) Darren Manning (2009)
- (France) Simon Pagenaud (2011)
- (Italy) Giorgio Pantano (2011)
- (United States) Graham Rahal (2010, 2023)
- (United States) Buddy Rice (2007–2008)
- (South Africa) Tomas Scheckter (2009–2010)
- (Spain) Oriol Servià (2012–2013)
- (Canada) Paul Tracy (2010–2011)
- (United States) Al Unser Jr. (2006)
- (United Kingdom) Justin Wilson (2010–2011)
- (United Kingdom) Stefan Wilson (2023)
- (United States) Roger Yasukawa (2005, 2007, 2009)

== Racing results ==
=== Complete IndyCar results ===
(key)

Year	Chassis	Engine	Drivers	No.	1	2	3	4	5	6	7	8	9	10	11	12	13	14	15	16	17	18	19	Pts Pos	Pos
2000					WDW	PHX	LSV	INDY	TXS	PPIR	ATL	KTY	TXS												
2000	G-Force GF05	Oldsmobile Aurora V8	(United States) Steve Knapp	23				19																38th	11
2000	G-Force GF05	Oldsmobile Aurora V8	(United States) Robbie Buhl	24	1*	7	5	26																8th	190
2000	G-Force GF05	Infiniti VRH35ADE V8	(United States) Robbie Buhl	24					18	23	6	13	18											8th	190
2001					PHX	HMS	ATL	INDY	TXS	PPIR	RIR	KAN	NSH	KTY	GAT	CHI	TXS								
2001	G-Force GF05B	Infiniti VRH35ADE V8	(United States) Robbie Buhl	24	11	24	20	15	21	3	9	21	13	9	5	22	3							12th	237
2002					HMS	PHX	FON	NAZ	INDY	TXS	PPIR	RIR	KAN	NSH	MCH	KTY	GAT	CHI	TXS						
2002	G-Force GF05C	Infiniti VRH35ADE V8	(United States) Robbie Buhl	22	12	13	DNS		16	20	23	13	21	21	24	10	6	20	18					17th	177
2002	G-Force GF05C	Infiniti VRH35ADE V8	(United States) Sarah Fisher	23				4	24			16	14	22	8	8	20	22	11					18th	161
2002	G-Force GF05C	Infiniti VRH35ADE V8	(United States) Memo Gidley	24			21																	46th	9
2003					HMS	PHX	MOT	INDY	TXS	PPIR	RIR	KAN	NSH	MCH	GAT	KTY	NAZ	CHI	FON	TXS					
2003	Dallara IR-03	Chevrolet Indy V8	(United States) Robbie Buhl	22	19	12	10	23	22	15	15	12	21	13	12	7	9	10	12	11				14th	261
2003	Dallara IR-03	Chevrolet Indy V8	(United States) Sarah Fisher	23	15	8	23	31	15	20	19	11	20	15	13	14	DNS	18	19	12				18th	211
2004					HMS	PHX	MOT	INDY	TXS	RIR	KAN	NSH	MIL	MCH	KTY	PPIR	NAZ	CHI	FON	TXS					
2004	Dallara IR-04	Chevrolet Indy V8	(United States) Robbie Buhl	24	10	18	21																	24th	44
2004	Dallara IR-04	Chevrolet Indy V8	(Brazil) Felipe Giaffone	24				15	9	10	16	15	13	16	16	16	16	8	20	11				20th	214
2005					HMS	PHX	STP	MOT	INDY	TXS	RIR	KAN	NSH	MIL	MCH	KTY	PPIR	SNM	CHI	WGL	FON				
2005	Dallara IR-05	Honda HI6R V8	(United States) Roger Yasukawa	24	17	18	11	18	18	15	16	22	11	15	18	17	15	11	15	15	16			17th	246
2005	Dallara IR-05	Honda HI6R V8	(United States) Jeff Bucknum (R)	44				22	22															25th	63
2005	Dallara IR-05	Honda HI6R V8	(Brazil) Thiago Medeiros (R)	44																	DNS			32nd	12
2006					HMS	STP	MOT	INDY	WGL	TXS	RIR	KAN	NSH	MIL	MCH	KTY	SNM	CHI							
2006	Dallara IR-05	Honda HI6R V8	(United States) Buddy Lazier	5	14	14	14	12		19	16	15			15									18th	122
2006	Dallara IR-05	Honda HI6R V8	(Australia) Ryan Briscoe	5					3				9	18			16							21st	83
2006	Dallara IR-05	Honda HI6R V8	(United States) Sarah Fisher	5												12		16						25th	32
2006	Dallara IR-05	Honda HI6R V8	(United States) Al Unser Jr.	31				24																35th	12
2007					HMS	STP	MOT	KAN	INDY	MIL	TXS	IOW	RIR	WGL	NSH	MOH	MCH	KTY	SNM	DET	CHI				
2007	Dallara IR-05	Honda HI7R V8	(United States) Buddy Rice	15	10	10	10	20	25	18	8	4	5	6	17	8	5	12	11	7	9			9th	360
2007	Dallara IR-05	Honda HI7R V8	(United States) Sarah Fisher	5	11	15	14	12	18	14	10	7	16	16	15	15	16	14	17	16	12			17th	275
2007	Dallara IR-05	Honda HI7R V8	(United States) Roger Yasukawa	24					21															30th	12
2008					HMS	STP	MOT	LBH	KAN	INDY	MIL	TXS	IOW	RIR	WGL	NSH	MOH	EDM	KTY	SNM	DET	CHI	SRF^{1}		
2008	Dallara IR-05	Honda HI7R V8	(United States) Buddy Rice	15	11	15	12		20	8	10	8	22	22	4	7	20	11	10	11	19	25		16th	306
2008	Dallara IR-05	Honda HI7R V8	(Venezuela) Milka Duno	23	20				16	19		17	24		20	17	23		21		23	14		25th	140
2008	Dallara IR-05	Honda HI7R V8	(United States) Townsend Bell	23		21	10				11			8				25		19				26th	117
2008	Dallara IR-05	Honda HI7R V8	(United States) Townsend Bell	99						10														26th	117
2009					STP	LBH	KAN	INDY	MIL	TXS	IOW	RIR	WGL	TOR	EDM	KTY	MOH	SNM	CHI	MOT	HMS				
2009	Dallara IR-05	Honda HI7R V8	(United Kingdom) Mike Conway (R)	24	22	21	19	18	20	19	8	18	6	22	20	17	20	3	16	22	15			17th	261
2009	Dallara IR-05	Honda HI7R V8	(United Kingdom) Darren Manning	23	8	16																		31st	38
2009	Dallara IR-05	Honda HI7R V8	(Venezuela) Milka Duno	23			16	20		23			17			20	21	17	21		17			24th	113
2009	Dallara IR-05	Honda HI7R V8	(United States) Roger Yasukawa	23																20				39th	12
2009	Dallara IR-05	Honda HI7R V8	(South Africa) Tomas Scheckter	23					13		6	11		16	19									20th	195
2009	Dallara IR-05	Honda HI7R V8	(South Africa) Tomas Scheckter	43						13						22			8	23	9			20th	195
2009	Dallara IR-05	Honda HI7R V8	(United States) John Andretti	43				19^{2}																37th	12
2009	Dallara IR-05	Honda HI7R V8	(United States) Davey Hamilton	44				29^{3}																40th	10
2010					SAO	STP	ALA	LBH	KAN	INDY	TXS	IOW	WGL	TOR	EDM	MOH	SNM	CHI	KTY	MOT	HMS				
2010	Dallara IR-05	Honda HI7R V8	(United Kingdom) Justin Wilson	22	11	2	7	2	18	7	19	24	10	7*	21	27	6	7	11	16	21			11th	361
2010	Dallara IR-05	Honda HI7R V8	(Brazil) Ana Beatriz (R)	23	13																			30th	55
2010	Dallara IR-05	Honda HI7R V8	(Brazil) Ana Beatriz (R)	24														24			26			30th	55
2010	Dallara IR-05	Honda HI7R V8	(Brazil) Ana Beatriz (R)	25						21														30th	55
2010	Dallara IR-05	Honda HI7R V8	(South Africa) Tomas Scheckter	23						15														29th	89
2010	Dallara IR-05	Honda HI7R V8	(South Africa) Tomas Scheckter	24							13			15	19									29th	89
2010	Dallara IR-05	Honda HI7R V8	(United Kingdom) Mike Conway	24	8	19	9	10	14	19														25th	110
2010	Dallara IR-05	Honda HI7R V8	(United States) Graham Rahal	24								9												20th	235
2010	Dallara IR-05	Honda HI7R V8	(Canada) Paul Tracy	24									14						12	22				27th	91
2010	Dallara IR-05	Honda HI7R V8	(United States) J. R. Hildebrand (R)	24												16	24							35th	26
2011					STP	ALA	LBH	SAO	INDY	TXS		MIL	IOW	TOR	EDM	MOH	NHA	SNM	BAL	MOT	KTY	LSV			
2011	Dallara IR-05	Honda HI7R V8	(United Kingdom) Justin Wilson	22	10	19	22	7	16	17	21	10	12	15	5	Wth								24th	183
2011	Dallara IR-05	Honda HI7R V8	(South Africa) Tomas Scheckter	22													23							32nd	52
2011	Dallara IR-05	Honda HI7R V8	(Italy) Giorgio Pantano (R)	22														17	26	16				36th	37
2011	Dallara IR-05	Honda HI7R V8	(United States) Townsend Bell	22																	11	C^{4}		35th	40
2011	Dallara IR-05	Honda HI7R V8	(France) Simon Pagenaud (R)	22												13								31st	56
2011	Dallara IR-05	Honda HI7R V8	(France) Simon Pagenaud (R)	24		8																		31st	56
2011	Dallara IR-05	Honda HI7R V8	(Brazil) Ana Beatriz	24	14		19	24	21	22	22	17	23	11	13	17	14	13	16	19	24	C^{4}		21st	212
2011	Dallara IR-05	Honda HI7R V8	(United States) Davey Hamilton	11					24	27	25											C^{4}		41st	26
2011	Dallara IR-05	Honda HI7R V8	(Canada) Paul Tracy	23					25															29th	68
2012					STP	ALA	LBH	SAO	INDY	DET	TEX	MIL	IOW	TOR	EDM	MOH	SNM	BAL	FON						
2012	Dallara DW12	Lotus DC00 V6t	(Spain) Oriol Servià^{5}	22	16	13	16	11																13th	287
2012	Dallara DW12	Chevrolet IndyCar V6t	(Spain) Oriol Servià^{5}	22					4	5	20	4	21	5	24	25	19	7	19					13th	287
2013					STP	ALA	LBH	SAO	INDY	DET		TXS	MIL	IOW	POC	TOR		MOH	SNM	BAL	HOU		FON		
2013	Dallara DW12	Chevrolet IndyCar V6t	(Spain) Oriol Servià^{5}	22	17	15	6	4	11															22nd	233
2014					STP	LBH	ALA	IMS	INDY	DET		TXS	HOU		POC	IOW	TOR		MOH	MIL	SNM	FON			
2014	Dallara DW12	Chevrolet IndyCar V6t	(United States) Sage Karam (R)	22					9^{3}															27th	57
2015					STP	NLA	LBH	ALA	IMS	INDY	DET		TXS	TOR	FON	MIL	IOW	MOH	POC	SNM					
2015	Dallara DW12	Chevrolet IndyCar V6t	(United States) Townsend Bell	24						14^{3}														35th	32
2016					STP	PHX	LBH	ALA	IMS	INDY	DET		ROA	IOW	TOR	MOH	POC	TXS	WGL	SNM					
2016	Dallara DW12	Chevrolet IndyCar V6t	(United States) Sage Karam	24						32^{3}														32nd	22
2017					STP	LBH	ALA	PHX	IMS	INDY	DET		TEX	ROA	IOW	TOR	MOH	POC	GAT	WGL	SNM				
2017	Dallara DW12	Chevrolet IndyCar V6t	(United States) Sage Karam	24						28^{3}														34th	23
2018					STP	PHX	LBH	ALA	IMS	INDY	DET		TEX	ROA	IOW	TOR	MOH	POC	GAT	POR	SNM				
2018	Dallara DW12	Chevrolet IndyCar V6t	(United States) Sage Karam	24						26														40th	10
2018	Dallara DW12	Chevrolet IndyCar V6t	(United States) J. R. Hildebrand	66						11														33rd	38
2019					STP	COTA	ALA	LBH	IMS	INDY	DET		TEX	ROA	IOW	TOR	MOH	POC	GAT	POR	LAG				
2019	Dallara DW12	Chevrolet IndyCar V6t	(United States) Sage Karam	24						19														27th	39
2019	Dallara DW12	Chevrolet IndyCar V6t	(United States) J. R. Hildebrand	48						20														33rd	20
2020					TEX	IMS	ROA	ROA	IOW	IOW	INDY	GTW	GTW	MOH	MOH	IMS	IMS	STP							
2020	Dallara DW12	Chevrolet IndyCar V6t	(United States) Sage Karam	24		23					24					23	24							29th	32
2020	Dallara DW12	Chevrolet IndyCar V6t	(United States) J. R. Hildebrand	67							16													30th	28
2021					ALA	STP	TXS		IMS	INDY	DET		ROA	MOH	NSH	IMS	GAT	POR	LAG	LBH					
2021	Dallara DW12	Chevrolet IndyCar V6t	(United States) Sage Karam	24						7														30th	53
2022					STP	TXS	LBH	ALA	IMS	INDY	DET	ROA	MOH	TOR	IOW		IMS	NSH	GAT	POR	LAG				
2022	Dallara DW12	Chevrolet IndyCar V6t	(United States) Santino Ferrucci	23						10														26th *	71*
2022	Dallara DW12	Chevrolet IndyCar V6t	(United States) Sage Karam	24						23														33rd*	14*
2023					STP	TXS	LBH	ALA	IMS	INDY	DET	ROA	MOH	TOR	IOW		IMS	NSH	GAT	POR	LAG				
2023	Dallara DW12	Chevrolet IndyCar V6t	(United States) Ryan Hunter-Reay	23						11														26th	131
2023	Dallara DW12	Chevrolet IndyCar V6t	(United Kingdom) Stefan Wilson	24						Wth														—	0*
2023	Dallara DW12	Chevrolet IndyCar V6t	(United States) Graham Rahal	24						22														15th	276
2024					STP	THE^{1}	LBH	ALA	IMS	INDY	DET	ROA	LAG	MOH	IOW		TOR	GAT	POR	MIL		NSH			
2024	Dallara DW12	Chevrolet IndyCar V6t	(United States) Ryan Hunter-Reay	23						26														42nd	6
2024	Dallara DW12	Chevrolet IndyCar V6t	(United States) Conor Daly	24						10														26th	119
2025					STP	THE	LBH	ALA	IMS	INDY	DET	GAT	ROA	MOH	IOW		TOR	LAG	POR	MIL	NSH				
2025	Dallara DW12	Chevrolet IndyCar V6t	(United States) Ryan Hunter-Reay	23						21														32nd	10
2025	Dallara DW12	Chevrolet IndyCar V6t	(United Kingdom) Jack Harvey	24						19														31st	12
2026					STP	PHX	ARL	ALA	LBH	IMS	INDY	DET	GAT	ROA	MOH	NSH	POR	MAR	D.C.	MIL		LAG			
2026	Dallara DW12	Chevrolet IndyCar V6t	(United States) Conor Daly	23							12													26th*	24*
2026	Dallara DW12	Chevrolet IndyCar V6t	(United Kingdom) Jack Harvey	24							22													28th*	8*

1. Non-points-paying, exhibition race.
2. In conjunction with Richard Petty Motorsports.
3. In conjunction with Kingdom Racing.
4. The final race at Las Vegas was abandoned after Dan Wheldon died from injuries sustained in a 15-car crash on lap 11.
5. In conjunction with Panther Racing.

=== IndyCar win ===
#	Season	Date	Sanction	Track / Race	No.	Winning driver	Chassis	Engine	Tire	Grid	Laps Led
1	2000	January 29	IRL	Walt Disney World Speedway (O)	24	(United States) Robbie Buhl	G-Force GF05	Oldsmobile Aurora V8	Firestone	22	49

=== Complete Global RallyCross results ===
(key)

==== GRC Lites ====
Year	Entrant	Car	No.	Driver	1	2	3	4	5	6	7	8	9	10	11	12	Lites	Points
2016	Dreyer & Reinbold Racing	Lites Ford Fiesta	2	(United States) Cabot Bigham	PHO1; 4	PHO2; 2	DAL; 2	DAY1; 7	DAY2; 6	MCAS1	MCAS2; C	DC; 1	AC; 5	SEA; 10	LA1; 3	LA2; 1	1st	452
2016	Dreyer & Reinbold Racing	Lites Ford Fiesta	24	(United States) Alex Keyes	PHO1; 3	PHO2; 8	DAL	DAY1	DAY2	MCAS1	MCAS2; C	DC; 5	AC; 1	SEA	LA1; 1	LA2; 7	6th	268
2016	Dreyer & Reinbold Racing	Lites Ford Fiesta	24	(United States) Tanner Whitten	PHO1	PHO2	DAL; 3	DAY1; 2	DAY2; 1	MCAS1	MCAS2; C	DC	AC	SEA; 8	LA1	LA2	9th	188
2017	Dreyer & Reinbold Racing	Lites Ford Fiesta	3	(United States) Travis PeCoy	MEM; 8	LOU; 8	THO1; 3	THO2; 5	OTT1; 4	OTT2; 2	INDY; 3	AC1; 4	AC2; 3	SEA1; 3	SEA2; 7	LA; 4	3rd	672
2017	Dreyer & Reinbold Racing	Lites Ford Fiesta	24	(United States) Alex Keyes	MEM; 9	LOU; 10	THO1; 5	THO2; 6	OTT1; 8	OTT2; 3	INDY; 8	AC1; 3	AC2; 5	SEA1; 6	SEA2; 3	LA; 2	5th	603
2017	Dreyer & Reinbold Racing	Lites Ford Fiesta	44	(United States) Christian Brooks	MEM; 3	LOU; 1	THO1; 2	THO2; 3	OTT1; 9	OTT2; 10	INDY; 1	AC1; 8	AC2; 2	SEA1; 2	SEA2; 1	LA; 3	2nd	692

=== Complete Americas Rallycross results ===
(key)

==== ARX2 ====
Year	Entrant	Car	No.	Driver	1	2	3	4	5	6	7	8	9	ARX2	Points
2018					COTA	TRR		COTA							
2018	Dreyer & Reinbold Racing	Olsbergs MSE	44	(United States) Christian Brooks	2	2	2	5	3					2nd	114
2018	Dreyer & Reinbold Racing	Olsbergs MSE	24	(United States) Matt Carpoff	8	10	7	8	9					7th	60
2018	Dreyer & Reinbold Racing	Olsbergs MSE	3	(United States) Travis PeCoy	9	3	9	9	8					8th	56
2018	Dreyer & Reinbold Racing	Olsbergs MSE	2	(United States) Cabot Bigham	DNP	4	10	6	4					10th	51
2019					MOH		GAT		TRR		COTA	MOH			
2019	Dreyer & Reinbold Racing	Olsbergs MSE	53	(United States) Cole Keatts	5	6	2	5	3	3	6	2	4	2nd	186
2019	Dreyer & Reinbold Racing	Olsbergs MSE	21	(United States) Conner Martell	DNP	DNP	1	1	2	2	3	4	DNQ	3rd	155
2019	Dreyer & Reinbold Racing	Olsbergs MSE	28	(United States) Gray Leadbetter	DNQ	5	DNQ	DNQ	4	4	5	DNQ	DNQ	5th	132
2019	Dreyer & Reinbold Racing	Olsbergs MSE	24	(United States) Sage Karam	2	2	DNP	DNP	DNP	DNP	2	1	2	6th	129
2019	Dreyer & Reinbold Racing	Olsbergs MSE	48	(United States) J. R. Hildebrand	4	4	3	4	DNP	DNP	DNP	DNP	DNP	9th	79
2019	Dreyer & Reinbold Racing	Olsbergs MSE	55	(United States) Lane Vacala	DNP	DNP	DNP	DNP	5	6	9	6	6	10th	71

=== Complete Nitro RallyCross results ===
==== Supercar ====
Year	Car	No.	Driver	1	2	3	4	5	Supercar	Points
2021				UMC	ERX	WHP	GHR	FIRM		
2021	Audi S1	34	(United States) Tanner Foust	7	7	6	13	6	6th	82
2021	Audi S1	02	(United States) Cabot Bigham	10	12	5	15	13	12th	30

==== NEXT ====
Year	Car	No.	Driver	1	2	3	4	5	6	7	8	9	10	NEXT	Points
2021				UMC		ERX		WHP		GHR		FIRM			
2021	Olsbergs MSE	24	(United States) Sage Karam	DNS	5	7	1	1	1	3	2	1	1	2nd	385
2021	Olsbergs MSE	55	(United States) Lane Vacala	3	4	4	3	4	4	7	4	7	8	5th	310
2021	Olsbergs MSE	21	(United States) Conner Martell					3	5	4	5	3	4	7th	210
2021	Olsbergs MSE	44	(United States) John Holtger			3	5							9th	70
2021	Olsbergs MSE	52	(United States) Simon Olofsson	5	7									10th	50

==== Group E ====
Year	Car	No.	Driver	1	2	3	4	5	6	7	8	9	10	Group E	Points
2022–23				LYD	STR	ERX	GHR	WHP		CTR	GHR				
2022–23	FC1-X	3	(Sweden) Johan Kristoffersson		3									12th	43
2022–23	FC1-X	4	(Sweden) Robin Larsson	1	2	2	2	5	1	3	8	4	1	1st	403
2022–23	FC1-X	13	(Norway) Andreas Bakkerud	2	1	4	3	3	8	7	1	3	3	2nd	371
2022–23	FC1-X	15	(United States) Andrew Carlson			6								15th	30
2022–23	FC1-X	35	(Jamaica) Fraser McConnell	4	4	3	1	6	6	4	2	9	2	3rd	348
2022–23	FC1-X	52	(Norway) Ole Christian Veiby	5										10th	32
2023–24	FC1-X			MID	UMC		WHP		GHR		LAS				
2023–24	FC1-X	4	(Sweden) Robin Larsson	2	6	1	2	1	3	1	2	1		1st	582
2023–24	FC1-X	13	(Norway) Andreas Bakkerud	2	3	5	5	6	6	9	6	8		4th	365
2023–24	FC1-X	15	(Sweden) Timmy Hansen								3	2		10th	139
2023–24	FC1-X	24	(United States) Conor Daly	8	5	11								9th	97
2023–24	FC1-X	35	(Jamaica) Fraser McConnell	1	11	4	1	2	5	2	1	4		2nd	504
2023–24	FC1-X	38	(United States) Brian Deegan				9	8	8	7				8th	155
2024–25				RIC		UMC		FMP		MIA		LAS			
2024–25	Dodge Hornet R/T FC1-X	4	(Sweden) Robin Larsson	1	4	2	2							1st*	219*
2024–25	Dodge Hornet R/T FC1-X	13	(Norway) Andreas Bakkerud	7	8	1	1							3rd*	191*
2024–25	Dodge Hornet R/T FC1-X	35	(Jamaica) Fraser McConnell	3	2	4	7							4th*	177*
2024–25	Dodge Hornet R/T FC1-X	57	(United States) Lia Block	6	6	9	5							8th*	114*
