= Cabot Bigham =

American racecar driver

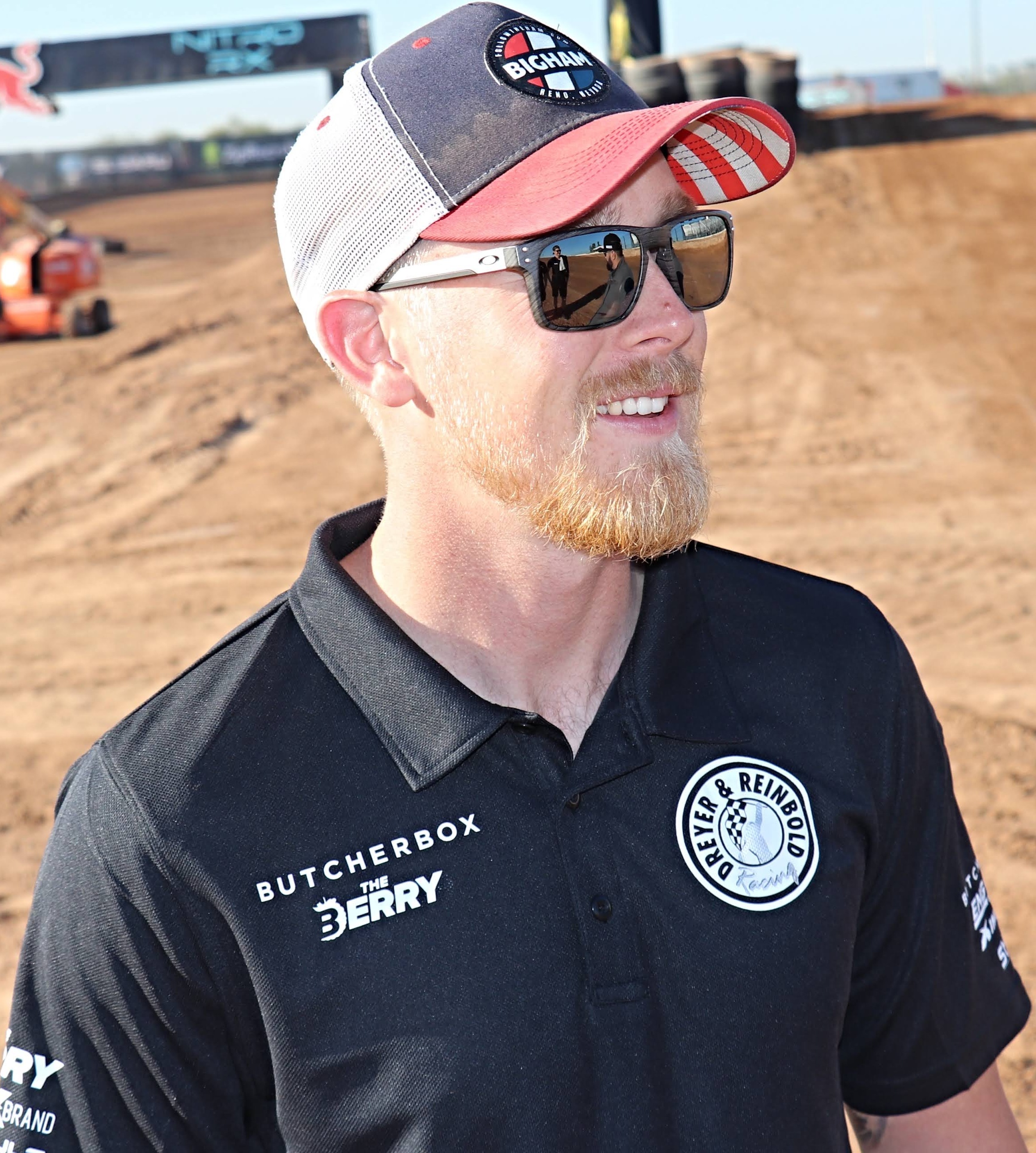
- Bigham at the 2021 Phoenix Nitro RX round
- Nationality: American
- Born: October 7, 1996 (age 30)

Nitro Rallycross career
- Debut season: 2021
- Car number: 02
- Former teams: Dreyer & Reinbold Racing
- Starts: 5
- Finished last season: 12th (2021)

Previous series
- 2016–2017 2018 2018–2019: Global Rallycross; Lucas Oil Off Road Racing Series; Americas Rallycross Championship

Championship titles
- 2016: Global Rallycross Lites

Cabot Bigham (born October 7, 1996) is an American racing driver. He last competed in Nitro Rallycross with Dreyer & Reinbold Racing. In 2016, he won the Global Rallycross championship in the Lites class.

== Racing record ==
=== Career summary ===
Season	Series	Team	Races	Wins	Podiums	Points	Position
2016	Global RallyCross Championship - GRC Lites	Dreyer & Reinbold Racing	11	2	5	452	1st
2017	Global RallyCross Championship	Bryan Herta Rallysport	10	0	0	473	10th
2018	Americas Rallycross Championship	Dreyer & Reinbold Racing	4	0	0	51	10th
2019	Americas Rallycross Championship	Volkswagen Andretti Rallycross	6	0	1	94	7th
2021	Nitro Rallycross Championship	Dreyer & Reinbold Racing	5	0	0	30	12th
2023	Michelin Pilot Challenge - TCR	Deily Motorsports	8	0	0	1620	18th

== Motorsports career results ==
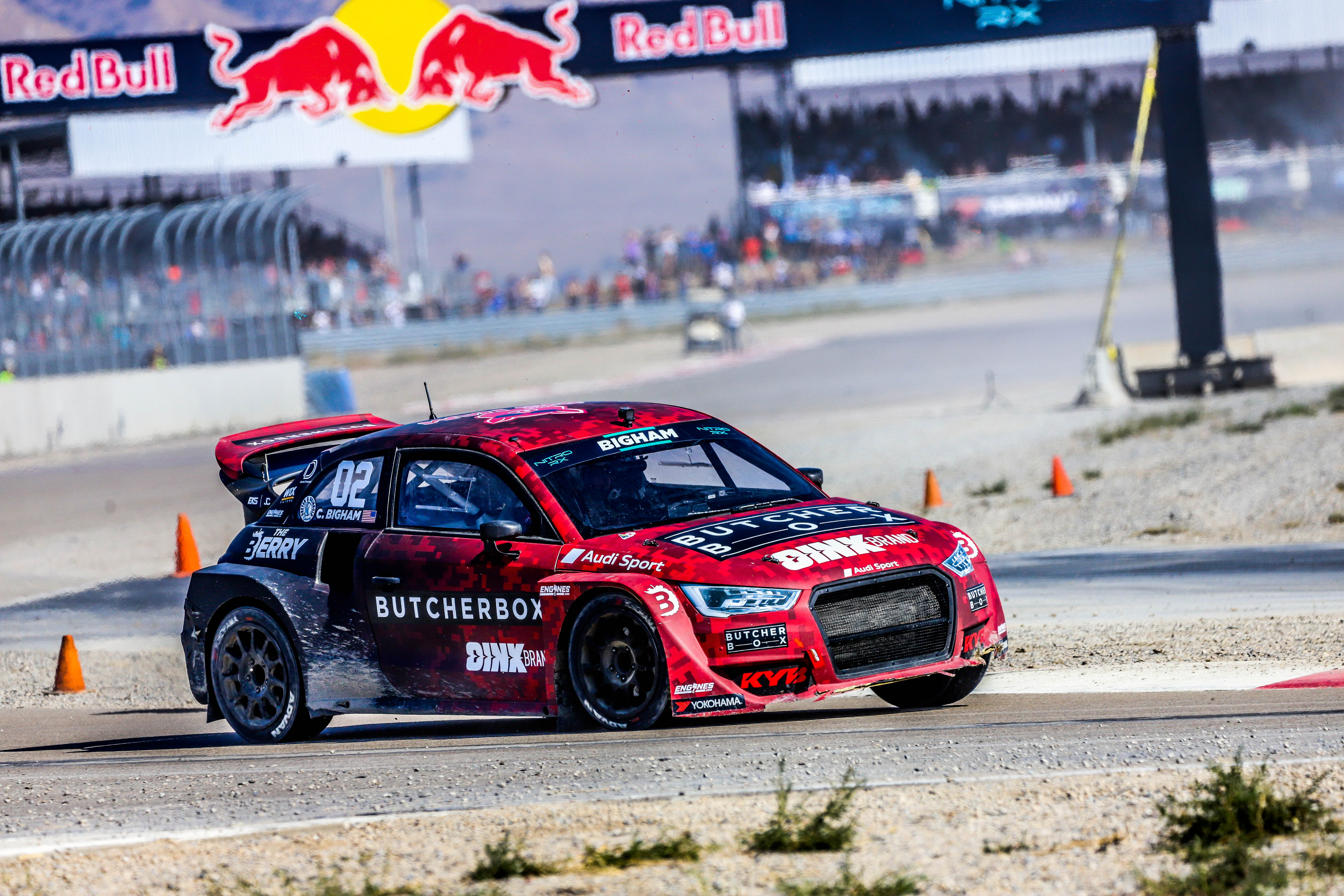
Bigham driving at Utah Motorsports Campus in Nitro Rallycross.

=== Complete Global RallyCross results ===
==== Lites ====
Year	Entrant	Car	No.	1	2	3	4	5	6	7	8	9	10	11	12	Lites	Points
2016				WHP		DAL	DAY		MCAS		RFK	ATC	EVG	LA			
2016	Dreyer & Reinbold Racing	Olsbergs MSE RX2	2	4	2	2	7	6	4	C	1	5	10	3	1	1st	452

==== Supercar ====
Year	Entrant	Car	No.	1	2	3	4	5	6	7	8	9	10	11	12	Supercar	Points
2017				MIR	KEC	TSM		OTT		IRP	ATC		EVG		LA		
2017	Bryan Herta Rallysport	Ford Fiesta ST	2	6	8	8	10	7	8	9	8	6			4	10th	473

=== Complete Americas RallyCross results ===
==== ARX2 ====
Year	Entrant	Car	No.	1	2	3	4	5	ARX2	Points
2018				COTA	TRR		COTA			
2018	Dreyer & Reinbold Racing	Olsbergs MSE RX2	2		4	10	6	4	10th	51

==== Supercar ====
Year	Entrant	Car	No.	1	2	3	4	5	6	Supercar	Points
2019				MOH	WWTR		TRR	COTA	MOH		
2019	Volkswagen Andretti Rallycross	Volkswagen Beetle	02	7	7	7	2	6	8	7th	94

=== Complete Nitro RallyCross results ===
==== Supercar ====
Year	Entrant	Car	No.	1	2	3	4	5	Supercar	Points
2021				UMC	ERX	WHP	GHR	FIRM		
2021	Dreyer & Reinbold Racing	Audi S1	02	10	12	5	15	13	12th	30

== Personal life ==
Bigham currently lives in Reno, Nevada. He graduated from the College of Marin with a degree in business administration and attended Woodside Priory School. Additionally, he started a clothing line called Oink Brand, named after his nickname, "The Big Ham".
