= 2021 Nitro Rallycross Championship =

Rallycross racing competition

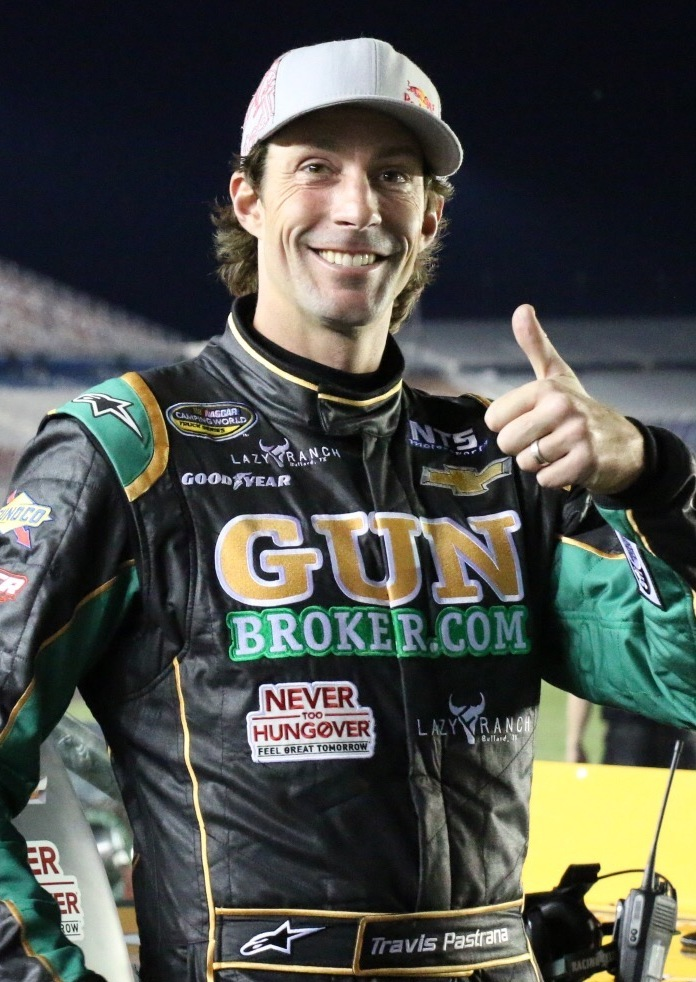
Travis Pastrana, the series founder and champion.

The 2021 Nitro Rallycross Championship was the first year of Nitro Rallycross (Nitro RX) competition as a standalone series. The season began on September 24–25 at Utah Motorsports Campus and ended at the Florida International Rally & Motorsports Park on December 4–5.

== Schedule ==
The 2021 schedule was revealed on March 11, 2021. A revised calendar came out on June 17 following the closure of Wild West Motorsports Park; the track was replaced by Glen Helen Raceway.

Rnd	Event	Date	Venue	Class	Winner	Team
1	NRX of Utah	September 24–25	Utah Motorsports Campus, Grantsville	Supercar	(Sweden) Timmy Hansen	(Sweden) Red Bull Hansen
1	NRX of Utah	September 24–25	Utah Motorsports Campus, Grantsville	NEXT (Day 1)	(Sweden) Casper Jansson	(Sweden) Enlunds Motorsport
1	NRX of Utah	September 24–25	Utah Motorsports Campus, Grantsville	NEXT (Day 2)	(United States) George Megennis	(Sweden) #Yellow Squad
2	NRX of Minnesota	October 2–3	ERX Motor Park, Elk River	Supercar	(United States) Scott Speed	(United States) Subaru Motorsports USA
2	NRX of Minnesota	October 2–3	ERX Motor Park, Elk River	NEXT (Day 1)	(Sweden) Martin Enlund	(Sweden) Enlunds Motorsport
2	NRX of Minnesota	October 2–3	ERX Motor Park, Elk River	NEXT (Day 2)	(United States) Sage Karam	(United States) Dreyer & Reinbold Racing
3	NRX of Arizona	November 13–14	Wild Horse Pass Motorsports Park, Phoenix	Supercar	(United States) Travis Pastrana	(United States) Subaru Motorsports USA
3	NRX of Arizona	November 13–14	Wild Horse Pass Motorsports Park, Phoenix	NEXT (Day 1)	(United States) Sage Karam	(United States) Dreyer & Reinbold Racing
3	NRX of Arizona	November 13–14	Wild Horse Pass Motorsports Park, Phoenix	NEXT (Day 2)	(United States) Sage Karam	(United States) Dreyer & Reinbold Racing
4	NRX of California	November 20–21	Glen Helen Raceway, San Bernardino	Supercar	(United States) Travis Pastrana	(United States) Subaru Motorsports USA
4	NRX of California	November 20–21	Glen Helen Raceway, San Bernardino	NEXT (Day 1)	(Sweden) Casper Jansson	(Sweden) Enlunds Motorsport
4	NRX of California	November 20–21	Glen Helen Raceway, San Bernardino	NEXT (Day 2)	(Sweden) Casper Jansson	(Sweden) Enlunds Motorsport
5	NRX of Florida	December 4–5	Florida International Rally and Motorsports Park, Starke	Supercar	(Sweden) Timmy Hansen	(Sweden) Red Bull Hansen
5	NRX of Florida	December 4–5	Florida International Rally and Motorsports Park, Starke	NEXT (Day 1)	(United States) Sage Karam	(United States) Dreyer & Reinbold Racing
5	NRX of Florida	December 4–5	Florida International Rally and Motorsports Park, Starke	NEXT (Day 2)	(United States) Sage Karam	(United States) Dreyer & Reinbold Racing

== Drivers ==
=== Supercar ===
Manufacturer	Team	Car	No.	Driver	Rounds
Audi	(United States) Dreyer & Reinbold Racing with EKS JC	Audi S1	02	(United States) Cabot Bigham	All
Audi	(United States) Dreyer & Reinbold Racing with EKS JC	Audi S1	34	(United States) Tanner Foust	All
Audi	(United Kingdom) Monster Energy RX Cartel	Audi S1	4	(Sweden) Robin Larsson	All
Audi	(United Kingdom) Monster Energy RX Cartel	Audi S1	33	(United Kingdom) Liam Doran	All
Ford	(Sweden) Olsbergs MSE	Ford Fiesta ST	16	(Sweden) Oliver Eriksson	All
Ford	(Sweden) Olsbergs MSE	Ford Fiesta ST	35	(Jamaica) Fraser McConnell	All
Honda	(Sweden) Olsbergs MSE	Honda Civic Coupe	15	(United States) Andrew Carlson	2
Honda	(Sweden) Olsbergs MSE	Honda Civic Coupe	23	(Sweden) Kevin Eriksson	All
Honda	(Sweden) Olsbergs MSE	Honda Civic Coupe	81	(Latvia) Ronalds Baldins	3–5
Hyundai	(United States) GRX Loenbro	Hyundai i20	00	(Canada) Steve Arpin	All
Mini	(United Kingdom) Xite Energy Racing	Mini Cooper	42	(United Kingdom) Oliver Bennett	All
Peugeot	(Sweden) Red Bull Hansen	Peugeot 208	9	(Sweden) Kevin Hansen	All
Peugeot	(Sweden) Red Bull Hansen	Peugeot 208	21	(Sweden) Timmy Hansen	All
Subaru	(United States) Subaru Motorsports USA	Subaru WRX STI	13	(Norway) Andreas Bakkerud	1–2, 4
Subaru	(United States) Subaru Motorsports USA	Subaru WRX STI	41	(United States) Scott Speed	All
Subaru	(United States) Subaru Motorsports USA	Subaru WRX STI	199	(United States) Travis Pastrana	All
Subaru	(United States) ZipRecruiter #GONITRO	Subaru WRX STI	9A	(United States) Chase Elliott	5
Subaru	(United States) ZipRecruiter #GONITRO	Subaru WRX STI	51	(United States) Kyle Busch	3

=== NEXT ===
Constructor	Entrant	Car	No.	Drivers	Rounds
OMSE	(United States) STS RX	Olsbergs MSE RX2			
OMSE	(United States) STS RX	Olsbergs MSE RX2	05	(United States) Kyle Schwartz	5–8
OMSE	(United States) STS RX	Olsbergs MSE RX2	52	(Sweden) Simon Olofsson	5–8
OMSE	(Sweden) #Yellow Squad	Olsbergs MSE RX2	9	(United States) George Megennis	All
OMSE	(United States) Dreyer & Reinbold Racing	Olsbergs MSE RX2	21	(United States) Connor Martell	5–8
OMSE	(United States) Dreyer & Reinbold Racing	Olsbergs MSE RX2	24	(United States) Sage Karam	All
OMSE	(United States) Dreyer & Reinbold Racing	Olsbergs MSE RX2	44	(United States) John Holtger	3–4
OMSE	(United States) Dreyer & Reinbold Racing	Olsbergs MSE RX2	52	(Sweden) Simon Olofsson	1–2
OMSE	(United States) Dreyer & Reinbold Racing	Olsbergs MSE RX2	55	(United States) Lane Vacala	All
OMSE	(Sweden) Enlunds Motorsport	Olsbergs MSE RX2			
OMSE	(Sweden) Enlunds Motorsport	Olsbergs MSE RX2	36	(Sweden) Casper Jansson	All
OMSE	(Sweden) Enlunds Motorsport	Olsbergs MSE RX2	60	(Sweden) Martin Enlund	All
OMSE	(United States) Bak40 Motorsports	Olsbergs MSE RX2	99	(United States) Eric Gordon	All

== Results and standings ==
=== Results ===
Round	Event	Heat 1 winner	Heat 2 winner	Heat 3 winner	Semi-Final 1 winner	Semi-Final 2 winner	Final winner	NEXT winner Day 1	NEXT winner Day 2
1	Utah	(Sweden) Timmy Hansen	(United States) Travis Pastrana		(United States) Scott Speed	(Norway) Andreas Bakkerud	(Sweden) Timmy Hansen	(Sweden) Casper Jansson	(United States) George Megennis
2	Minnesota	(United States) Travis Pastrana	(United States) Scott Speed		(Canada) Steve Arpin	(Sweden) Timmy Hansen	(United States) Scott Speed	(Sweden) Martin Enlund	(United States) Sage Karam
3	Arizona	(United States) Travis Pastrana	(Sweden) Timmy Hansen		(United States) Scott Speed	(Canada) Steve Arpin	(United States) Travis Pastrana	(United States) Sage Karam	(United States) Sage Karam
4	California	(United States) Travis Pastrana	(United States) Scott Speed		(Norway) Andreas Bakkerud	(Canada) Steve Arpin	(United States) Travis Pastrana	(Sweden) Casper Jansson	(Sweden) Casper Jansson
5	Florida	(United States) Travis Pastrana	(Sweden) Timmy Hansen	(United States) Scott Speed	(Sweden) Kevin Hansen	(Canada) Steve Arpin	(Sweden) Timmy Hansen	(United States) Sage Karam	(United States) Sage Karam

=== Drivers' championship ===
1st / 2nd / 3rd / 4th / 5th / 6th / 7th / 8th / 9th / 10th; 50 / 45 / 40 / 35 / 30 / 25 / 20 / 15 / 10 / 5	Bonuses: Battle winner / 1

==== Supercar ====
Rank	Driver	(Utah) UMC	(Minnesota) ERX	(Arizona) WHP (Note: Final was limited to eight cars.)	(California) HLN	(Florida) FIR	Pts
1	(United States) Travis Pastrana	6^{3}	2^{2}	1^{4}	1^{3}	4^{2}	219
2	(United States) Scott Speed	5^{4}	1^{3}	3^{1}	2^{2}	3^{4}	219
3	(Sweden) Timmy Hansen	1^{1}	4^{1}	2^{2}	5^{1}	1^{3}	218
4	(Sweden) Kevin Hansen	3^{1}	3^{4}	7^{1}	9^{4}	2^{2}	157
5	(Canada) Steve Arpin	2^{2}	9^{2}	8^{3}	6	7^{1}	123
6	(United States) Tanner Foust	7^{1}	7	6	13	6^{1}	82
7	(Sweden) Robin Larsson	11	6^{1}	9^{1}	8	5^{1}	73
8	(Norway) Andreas Bakkerud	9	6		3^{1}		71
9	(Jamaica) Fraser McConnell	4^{2}	5^{1}	10^{1}	11^{2}	15	71
10	(Sweden) Kevin Eriksson	13	13	14^{2}	4^{1}	10	38
11	(United States) Kyle Busch			4			35
12	(United States) Cabot Bigham	10 (Note: Cabot Bigham did not start the Final due to damage suffered in the LCQ. He did not receive any points.)	12	5	15	13	30
13	(Sweden) Oliver Eriksson	8	10	11	10^{1}	9^{1}	27
14	(Latvia) Ronalds Baldins			12	7	12	20
15	(United States) Chase Elliott					8	15
16	(United Kingdom) Oliver Bennett	12^{1}	11	13	14	14	1
17	(United Kingdom) Liam Doran	14	14^{1}	15	12	11	1
18	(United States) Andrew Carlson		15				0

Key
Colour	Result
Gold	Winner
Silver	2nd place
Bronze	3rd place
Green	Other finishing position
Blue	Non Points finish
Purple	Did not finish
Pink	Did not qualify (DNQ)
Black	Disqualified (DSQ)
White	Did not start (DNS)
White	Withdrew (WD)
White	Race cancelled (C)

Notes:
^{1 2 3 4} – Battle Wins

==== NEXT ====
Rank	Driver	(Utah) UMC		(Minnesota) ERX		(Arizona) WHP		(California) HLN		(Florida) FIR		Pts
1	(Sweden) Casper Jansson	1	3	2	6	7	3	1	1	5	2	395
2	(United States) Sage Karam	DNS	5	7	1	1	1	3	2	1	1	385
3	(Sweden) Martin Enlund	2	2	1	2	5	6	6	3	4	3	380
4	(United States) George Megennis	6	1	5	7	2	2	2	7	2	7	345
5	(United States) Lane Vacala	3	4	4	3	4	4	7	4	7	8	310
6	(United States) Eric Gordon	4	6	6	4	6	7	5	6	8	6	260
7	(United States) Conner Martell					3	5	4	5	3	4	210
8	(United States) Kyle Schwartz					DNS	DNS	8	8	6	5	85
9	(United States) John Holtger			3	5							70
10	(Sweden) Simon Olofsson	5	7			DNS	DNS	DNS	DNS			50
