= Scott Speed =

American racing driver (born 1983)

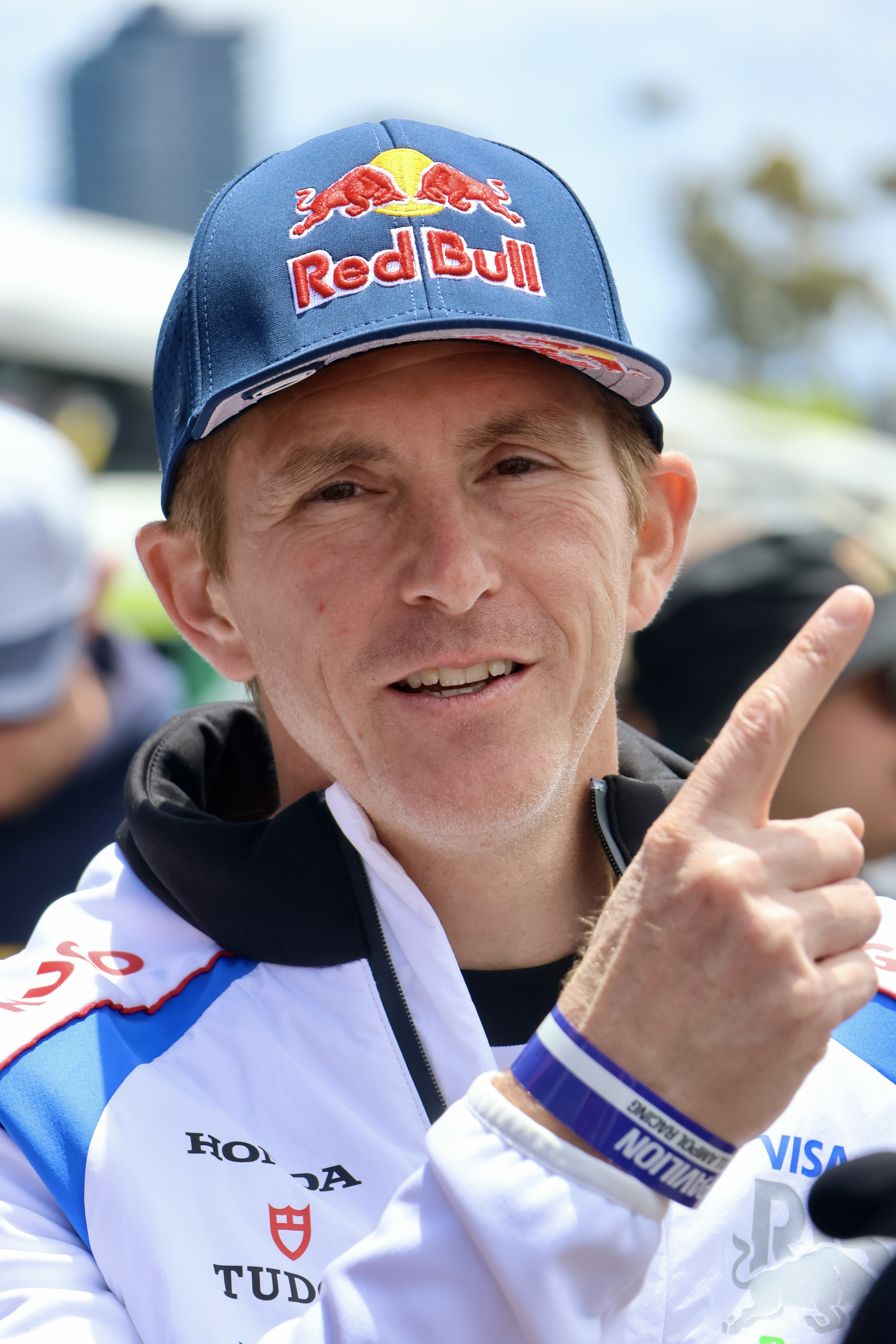
- Speed at the 2025 Adelaide Grand Final
- Born: Scott Andrew Speed; January 24, 1983 (age 43) Manteca, California, U.S.

Nitro Rallycross career
- Debut season: 2021
- Current team: Subaru Motorsports USA
- Categorisation: FIA Platinum
- Car number: 41
- Starts: 5
- Wins: 1
- Podiums: 4
- Best finish: 2nd in 2021

Previous series
- 2018–2019 2013–2017 2014–15 2014 2011 2009 2007–2008 2006–2007 2005–06 2005 2004 2004 2004 2003 2002 2002 2001: Americas Rallycross Championship; Global Rallycross Championship; Formula E Super Trofeo North America; IndyCar Series; Rolex Sports Car Series; ARCA Racing Series; Formula One; A1 Grand Prix; GP2 Series; Formula Renault 2000 Eurocup; Formula Renault 2000 Germany; Asian Formula Renault; British Formula Three; Star Mazda; Formula Dodge; Formula Russell

Championship titles
- 2018 2015–2017 2004 2004: Americas Rallycross; Global Rallycross; Formula Renault 2000 Eurocup; Formula Renault 2000 Germany

NASCAR Cup Series career
- 118 races run over 6 years
- 2013 position: 41st
- Best finish: 30th (2010)
- First race: 2008 TUMS QuikPak 500 (Martinsville)
- Last race: 2013 AdvoCare 500 (Atlanta)
Wins	Top tens	Poles
0	4	0

NASCAR O'Reilly Auto Parts Series career
- 29 races run over 3 years
- Best finish: 34th (2009)
- First race: 2009 Sam's Town 300 (Las Vegas)
- Last race: 2012 Feed the Children 300 (Kentucky)
Wins	Top tens	Poles
0	9	1

NASCAR FedEx Freight Truck Series career
- 16 races run over 1 year
- Best finish: 21st (2008)
- First race: 2008 American Commercial Lines 200 (Atlanta)
- Last race: 2008 Ford 200 (Homestead)
- First win: 2008 AAA Insurance 200 (Dover)
Wins	Top tens	Poles
1	9	1

Formula One World Championship career
- Nationality: (United States) American
- Active years: 2006–2007
- Team: Toro Rosso
- Entries: 28 (28 starts)
- Championships: 0
- Wins: 0
- Podiums: 0
- Career points: 0
- Pole positions: 0
- Fastest laps: 0
- First entry: 2006 Bahrain Grand Prix
- Last entry: 2007 European Grand Prix
Medal record
Representing United States
Summer X Games
Gold medal – first place	2015 Austin	RallyCross
Gold medal – first place	2014 Austin	RallyCross
Gold medal – first place	2013 Foz do Iguaçu	RallyCross
- Statistics up to date as of July 22, 2016.

Scott Andrew Speed (born January 24, 1983) is an American auto racing driver who has competed in numerous disciplines, including open-wheel, stock car, and rallycross racing.

In 2006, Speed became the first American driver to race in Formula One since Michael Andretti in 1993, when he made his début at the 2006 Bahrain Grand Prix for Scuderia Toro Rosso. He contested 28 races before he was replaced midway through the 2007 season by Sebastian Vettel. Speed later turned his career towards stock car racing, specifically NASCAR where he drove for Team Red Bull, Whitney Motorsports and Leavine Family Racing in the Cup Series. Subsequently, he moved into Global Rallycross with Andretti Autosport, winning the title in 2015, 2016 and 2017. He won the 2018 Americas Rallycross Championship with Andretti before racing in 2019 with Subaru Rally Team USA.

== Early years ==
Speed was born in Manteca, California and graduated from East Union High School in 2001. Speed's career started at the age of ten in karting, his stint there lasting from 1993 until 2001, winning the SKUSA Super Pro Title for JM Racing driving a Tony Kart Swedetech Honda in 2000, two IKF Grand Nationals driving a six-year-old kart, and three IKF regional titles. He also won the 2002 Rock Island GP in 125cc Shifter Karts. He moved up to the Formula series in 2001, competing in US Formula Russell and becoming champion. He drove in both the Formula Dodge National Championship and Star Mazda in 2002, finishing third and eighth respectively.

In 2003, Speed drove for Alan Docking Racing in the British Formula Three Championship after winning the Red Bull Driver Search programme. During that year, he fell ill with ulcerative colitis, a form of inflammatory bowel disease, and was forced to return to the United States for treatment.

After returning in 2004, Speed won two championship titles, with him first winning the Formula Renault 2000 Eurocup and later the Formula Renault 2000 Germany, despite his worsening colitis. His performances resulted in a drive in the inaugural season of GP2 Series for 2005, as number two at iSport International, to Can Artam. Speed was later promoted to the first driver for the team, as he collected five podiums and twelve top-five finishes in 24 races. He ended the season third place in the drivers' championship standings behind Nico Rosberg and Heikki Kovalainen.

At the end of 2005, Speed drove the first three races of the new A1 Grand Prix series for A1 Team USA, achieving a best result of fourth in the Portugal feature race.

== Formula One ==
=== Red Bull (2005) ===
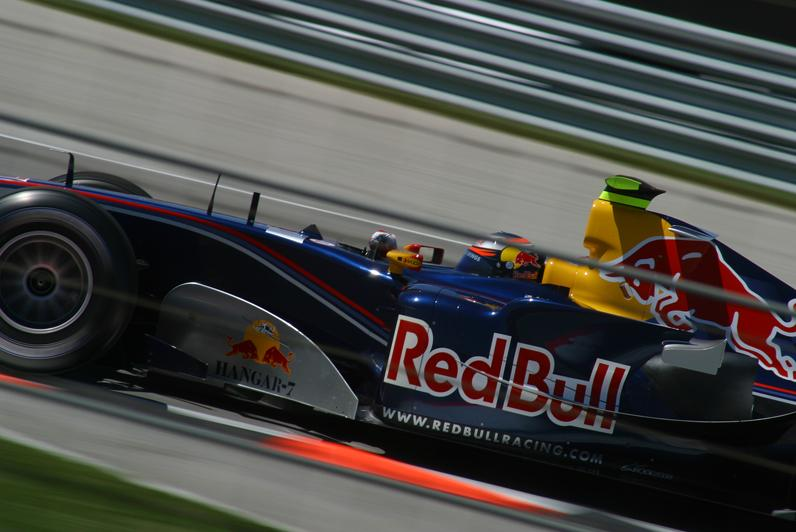
Speed as Red Bull's third driver at the 2005 United States Grand Prix

In 2005 at the Canadian Grand Prix, Speed took part as a test driver for Red Bull Racing; becoming the first American driver to participate in a Formula One event since Michael Andretti's 1993 stint. He was also the test driver at the United States Grand Prix.

Following its purchase of Minardi, Red Bull Racing announced the creation of Scuderia Toro Rosso with Speed and Vitantonio Liuzzi as its drivers in 2006.

=== Toro Rosso (2006–07) ===
==== 2006 ====
In his debut race at the Bahrain Grand Prix, Speed finished thirteenth. A week later at the Malaysian Grand Prix he retired after 41 laps due to a clutch failure. After the Australian Grand Prix it looked as if he had scored his and Toro Rosso's first point. Later on, however, he had 25 seconds added to his race time for overtaking under yellow flags, dropping him to ninth place and out of the points. He was also fined $5000 for using inappropriate language towards David Coulthard during a post-race stewards hearing.

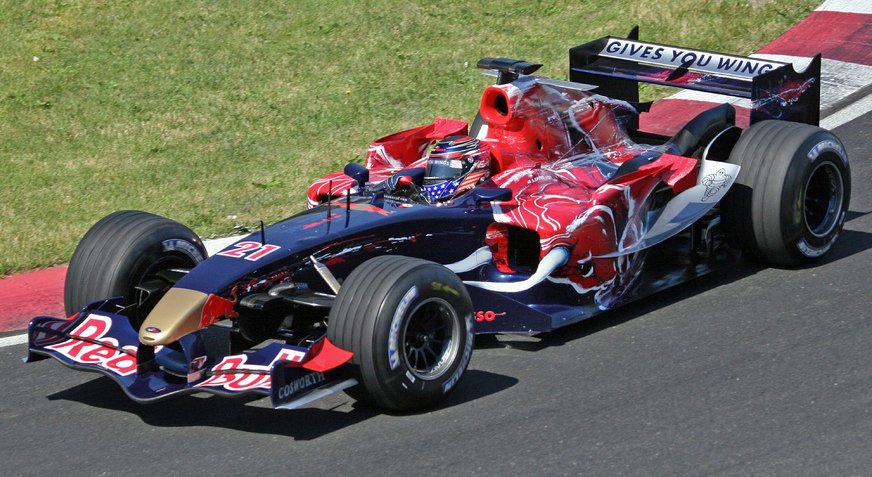
Speed at the 2006 Canadian Grand Prix

Speed finished the San Marino Grand Prix in fifteenth place. A week later and after a decent run at the European Grand Prix, he finished eleventh. He retired from the Spanish Grand Prix with an engine failure and in his first Monaco Grand Prix he finished thirteenth. He retired from the British Grand Prix on the opening lap with accident damage after colliding with Ralf Schumacher. Speed bounced back and ran rather well at the Canadian Grand Prix finishing tenth.

At the United States Grand Prix, Speed qualified a career-best thirteenth only to be taken out in a first-lap collision. In turn 2, McLaren's Juan Pablo Montoya nudged his teammate Kimi Räikkönen into a spin. Montoya then clouted Honda's Jenson Button whose front right tyre got caught by BMW Sauber's Nick Heidfeld who was launched into a triple barrel roll. Speed was caught up in the resulting melee. None of the drivers were injured. His teammate Liuzzi finished eighth and scored the team's first World Championship point. At the French Grand Prix he finished tenth, matching David Coulthard's pace throughout, after suffering from back pains and breathing problems, consequences from a Friday practice accident.

After crashing during the first qualifying session for the German Grand Prix, Speed finished twelfth in the race. At the Hungarian Grand Prix he finished eleventh and four laps behind the leader in very wet and changeable conditions. At the Turkish Grand Prix, Speed started in eighteenth and finished thirteenth, from fifteen classified runners. At the next round, the Italian Grand Prix, Speed qualified fifteenth in Toro Rosso's home race and made two places to finish thirteenth. At the Chinese Grand Prix, Speed qualified in eleventh place in wet conditions, but an equally wet race saw him slip back to fourteenth by the end. At the next round in Japan, Speed started the race in nineteenth. Suffering a power steering failure with five laps remaining, Speed was unable to finish but was classified in seventeenth place. Finally, at the season-ending Brazilian Grand Prix, Speed finished eleventh of the seventeen cars classified after starting down in seventeenth.

After much speculation, Scuderia Toro Rosso confirmed on February 24, 2007, that Speed had signed to continue driving for the team in the 2007 Formula One season. He once again teamed up with Vitantonio Liuzzi.

==== 2007 ====
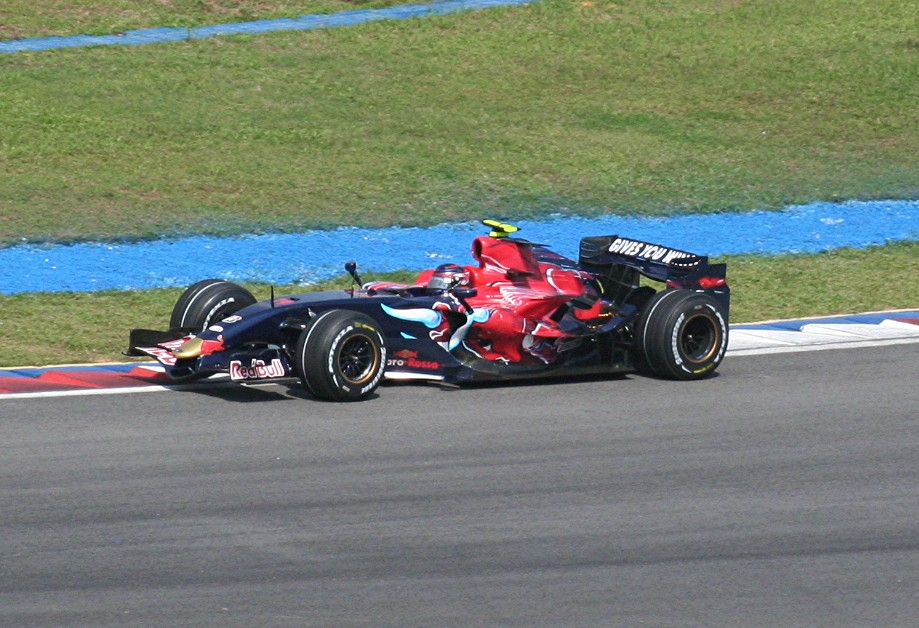
Speed driving for STR at the 2007 Malaysian Grand Prix

Speed's 2007 season was largely disappointing, punctuated with poor reliability and several crashes. He had two separate collisions with Alexander Wurz at Silverstone and at Canada which put him out of the race. He then spun off in the wet at the European Grand Prix, in what would be his last race for the team. After the race, it was reported that he was involved in a physical altercation with team principal Franz Tost, although Tost has since denied this. Speed also went on a verbal offensive against the team, claiming that they wanted to get rid of both him and Liuzzi. Speed's future with Toro Rosso remained very much in doubt for the rest of that season. The doubts were seemingly calmed after continued testing for the team. From the pre-season through the Nürburgring, he and the team had endured constant speculation over the status of his tenure.

However, it was announced before the Hungarian Grand Prix that he had been replaced by BMW third driver Sebastian Vettel. The best result of Speed's season was ninth place at Monaco from 18th on the grid, just missing out on a championship point but finishing just ahead of the Hondas of Rubens Barrichello and Jenson Button.

On July 31, 2007, Speed was released from his contract at Scuderia Toro Rosso and replaced by BMW Sauber test driver Sebastian Vettel, who was under contract to Red Bull's driver development programme. Speed has said that no amount of money would get him to work with the Toro Rosso team bosses in the future. Nevertheless, Speed's relationship with Red Bull as a whole remained good, and he secured a Red Bull-backed drive in the U.S. for 2008.

== ARCA Re/MAX Series ==
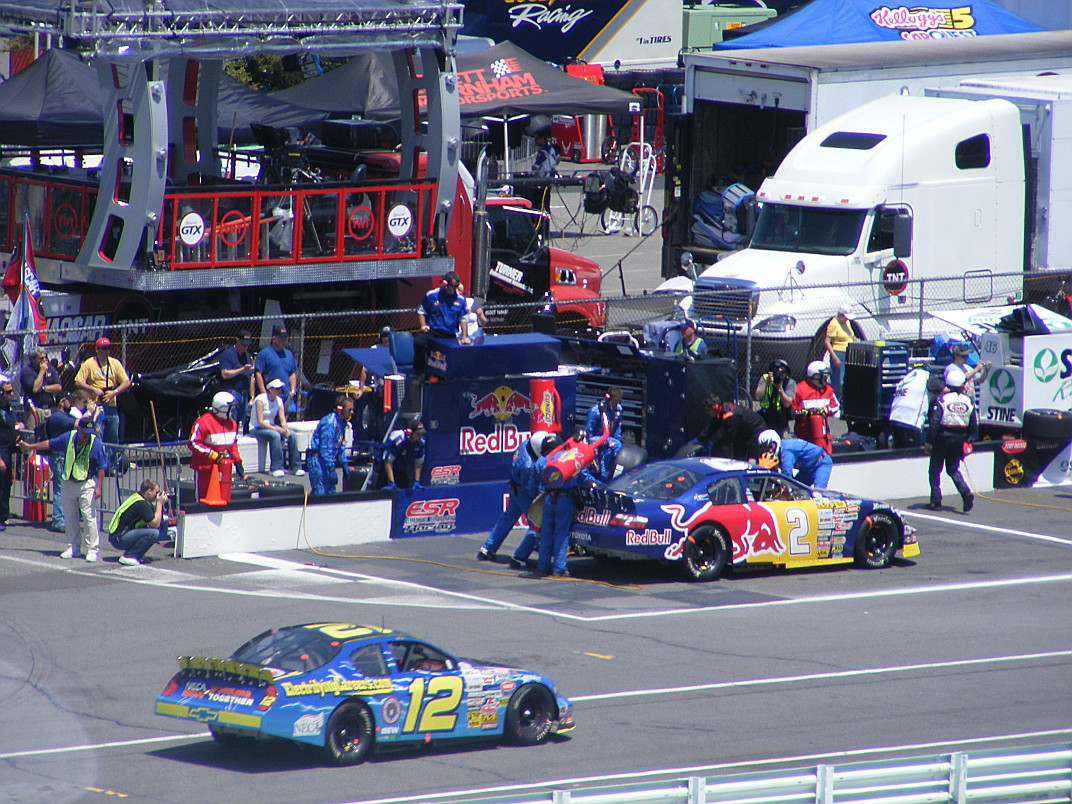
Speed pits the No. 2 Red Bull Toyota at Pocono Raceway, during the 2008 Pocono 200.

In preparation for his impending NASCAR career, Speed entered into the Automobile Racing Club of America (ARCA) series in selected races in 2007, and a full season in 2008. Driving the Red Bull-sponsored Toyota for Eddie Sharp Racing with teammates Ken Butler Jr & Pierre Bourque, Speed finished fifth in ARCA RE/MAX Series points in 2008. He was in prime position to win the championship, but in the final race, he was wrecked by Ricky Stenhouse Jr. who was another contender for the championship. Speed, along with car owner Sharp, earned the Hoosier Tire Superspeedway Challenge title in 2008. In 22 career starts from 2007, Speed scored ten top-five finishes and eighteen top-tens including four wins at Kansas Speedway, Kentucky Speedway, Berlin Raceway and Nashville Superspeedway, all occurring in 2008. Speed was a championship contender in the 2008 season, however the season ended in controversy, and without a championship for Speed and Eddie Sharp Racing.

During the finale of the 2008 ARCA season, Speed and championship contender, Ricky Stenhouse Jr. were battling for position. Stenhouse hit the rear of Speed's car, sending him into the wall, effectively ending Speed's chances of a good finish, and possibly a championship. After visiting the pits for repairs, Speed's car was well off the pace and was lapped within two laps of the restart. As Stenhouse came by to lap Speed, Speed accelerated and slammed his car into Stenhouse, sending both cars into the wall. Neither driver was injured, however ARCA officials parked Speed for the day, which ended his chances for a championship.

== NASCAR ==
=== 2008 ===
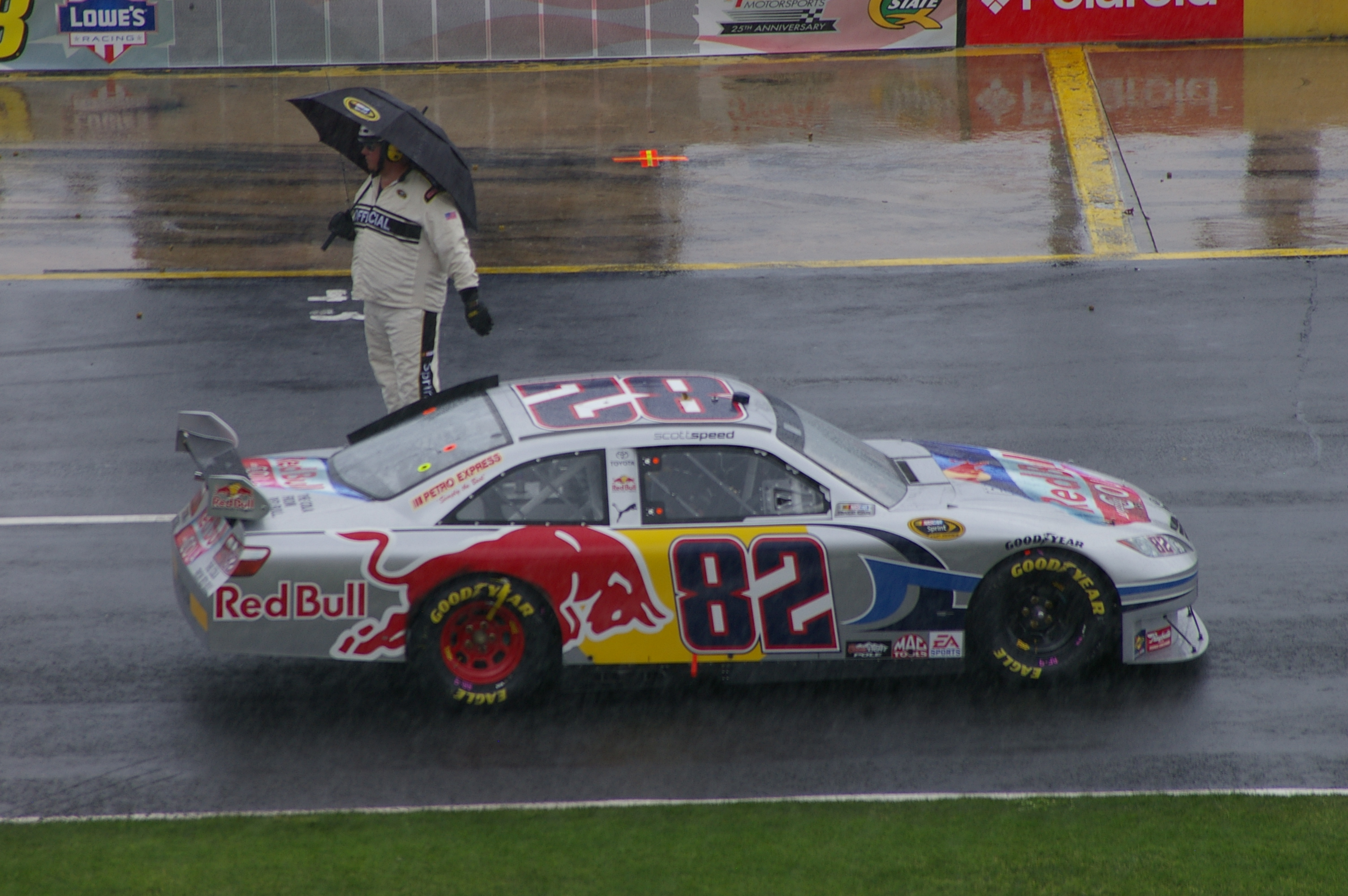
Speed's No. 82 at the 2009 Coca-Cola 600

Speed made his NASCAR Craftsman Truck Series debut at Atlanta Motor Speedway on March 7, 2008, driving for Morgan-Dollar Motorsports No. 46 Chevy with Red Bull sponsorship. He recorded his first career top-ten finish in NASCAR in just his second race when he finished tenth at Martinsville Speedway. On April 25, 2008, he won his first ARCA race at Kansas Speedway in just his fourth start. On April 26, 2008; Speed recorded a back-to-back top-ten finish in the NASCAR Craftsman Truck Series at Kansas Speedway by finishing in eighth place in the No. 22 Red Bull Toyota for Bill Davis Racing, and won his first career race the following week at Dover. Two races after his first win, Speed scored another top-five at Michigan International Speedway. On July 18, 2008, Speed won his second ARCA race at Kentucky Speedway. On Sunday, October 19, 2008, Speed started his first NASCAR Cup Series event at Martinsville Speedway, finishing in thirtieth place. He finished the season in the No. 84 Team Red Bull Toyota Camry.

=== 2009 ===
For the 2009 Sprint Cup season, Speed's car was renumbered to No. 82. He was eligible to race in the 31st Annual Budweiser Shootout at Daytona International Speedway, as his car was one of the top six Toyotas in points. He began his quest for Rookie of the Year in 2009, and he won his first-ever Rookie of the Race honors at the Daytona 500. Speed won the pole for the Sam's Town 300 in his Nationwide Series debut on February 28, 2009; he also broke the track record with a speed of 182.451 mph (293.626 km/h) and a lap time of 29.597 seconds. However, he collided with Kyle Busch early on and finished fortieth.

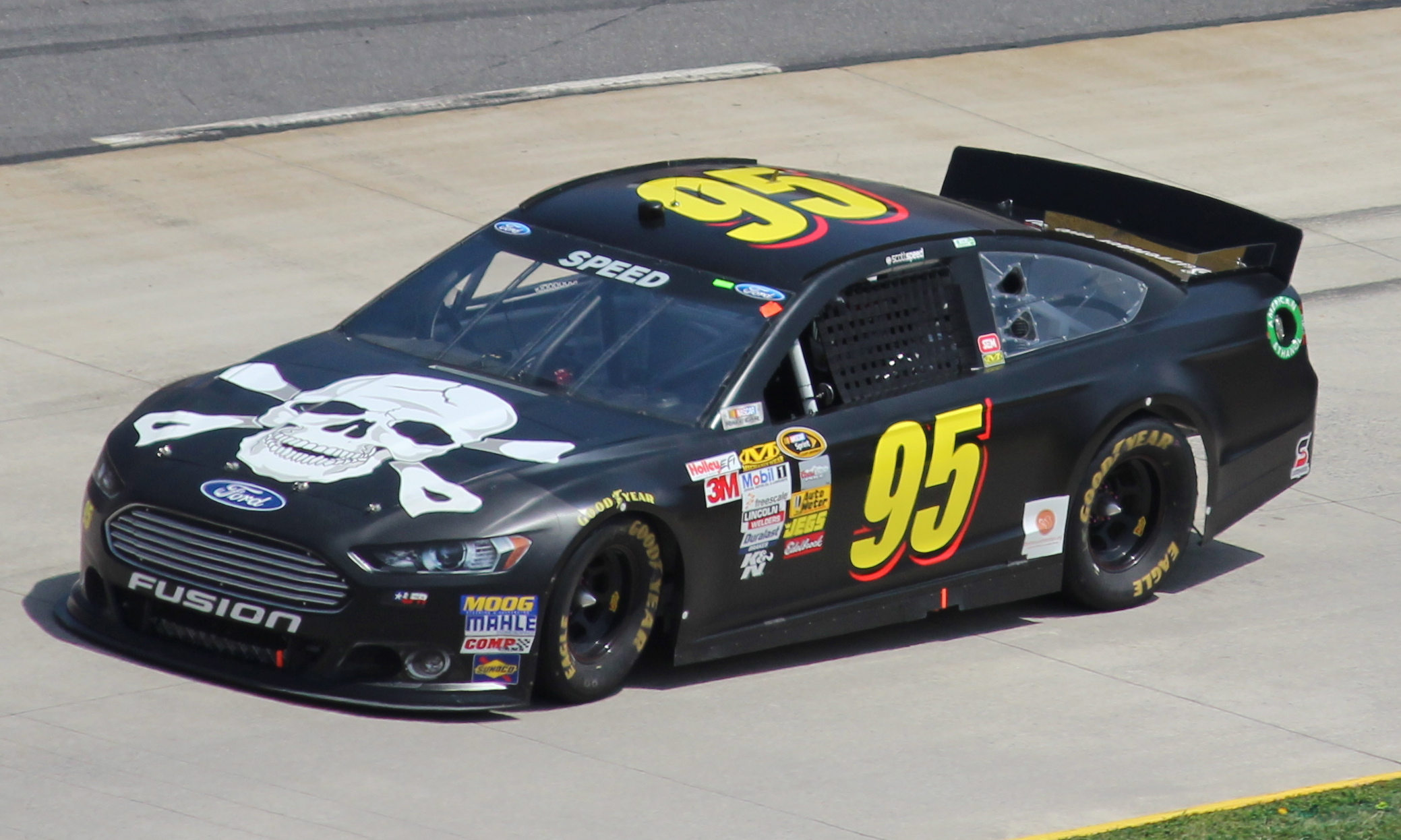
Speed competing in the 2013 STP Gas Booster 500

After failing to qualify for Darlington and Sonoma, Speed competed in Joe Nemechek's No. 87 Toyota. He failed to qualify for the April Texas race.

=== 2010 ===
Red Bull Racing's No. 82 finished 36th in the 2009 owner's points standings, missing a guaranteed entry into the first five races of 2010 by one position. Speed successfully qualified for the 2010 Daytona 500. He led several laps late in the race after not going to the pits with about nineteen laps to go. The next week at Auto Club Speedway, during a rain caution, Speed did not pit and ultimately ran out of gas. Speed was in the top-twelve after the Food City 500 which guaranteed him a spot in the top-35. During the Michigan race in June, an incident occurred between Speed and his temporary teammate Casey Mears; when they were running 34th and 35th respectively, Mears collided with Speed and he spun out, causing a caution. Mears was replaced by Reed Sorenson for the remainder of the season. On November 26, 2010, Speed was released from his contract at Red Bull Racing to make room for the returning Brian Vickers who underwent heart surgery in June 2010; causing Speed to file a lawsuit against Red Bull accusing them of violating his contract. Speed's best finish with Red Bull Racing was fifth at Talladega in the 2009 Aaron's 499.

=== 2011–13 ===
Speed was without a ride for most of the 2011 season; he drove for Whitney Motorsports for several races at the end of the year. In 2012, he ran a limited schedule for Leavine Family Racing in the No. 95 Ford; it was announced in August that he would return to the team for 2013 to run the majority of the season.

Despite scoring Leavine's first top-ten finish at Talladega, Speed was released from the team after Atlanta in September. He has not raced since.

== IndyCar ==
Speed attempted to qualify for the 2011 Indianapolis 500 with Dragon Racing. However, he struggled to get the car up to speed and was replaced on the final day of qualifying by Patrick Carpentier, who promptly crashed the car in practice. Speed also turned down a chance to earn $5 million as part of a promotion at Las Vegas Motor Speedway for drivers not running the full IndyCar season to participate in the 2011 IZOD IndyCar World Championships. Just hours after the crash that claimed the life of Dan Wheldon, Speed said it was too dangerous for IndyCars to run on oval tracks.

== Rallycross ==
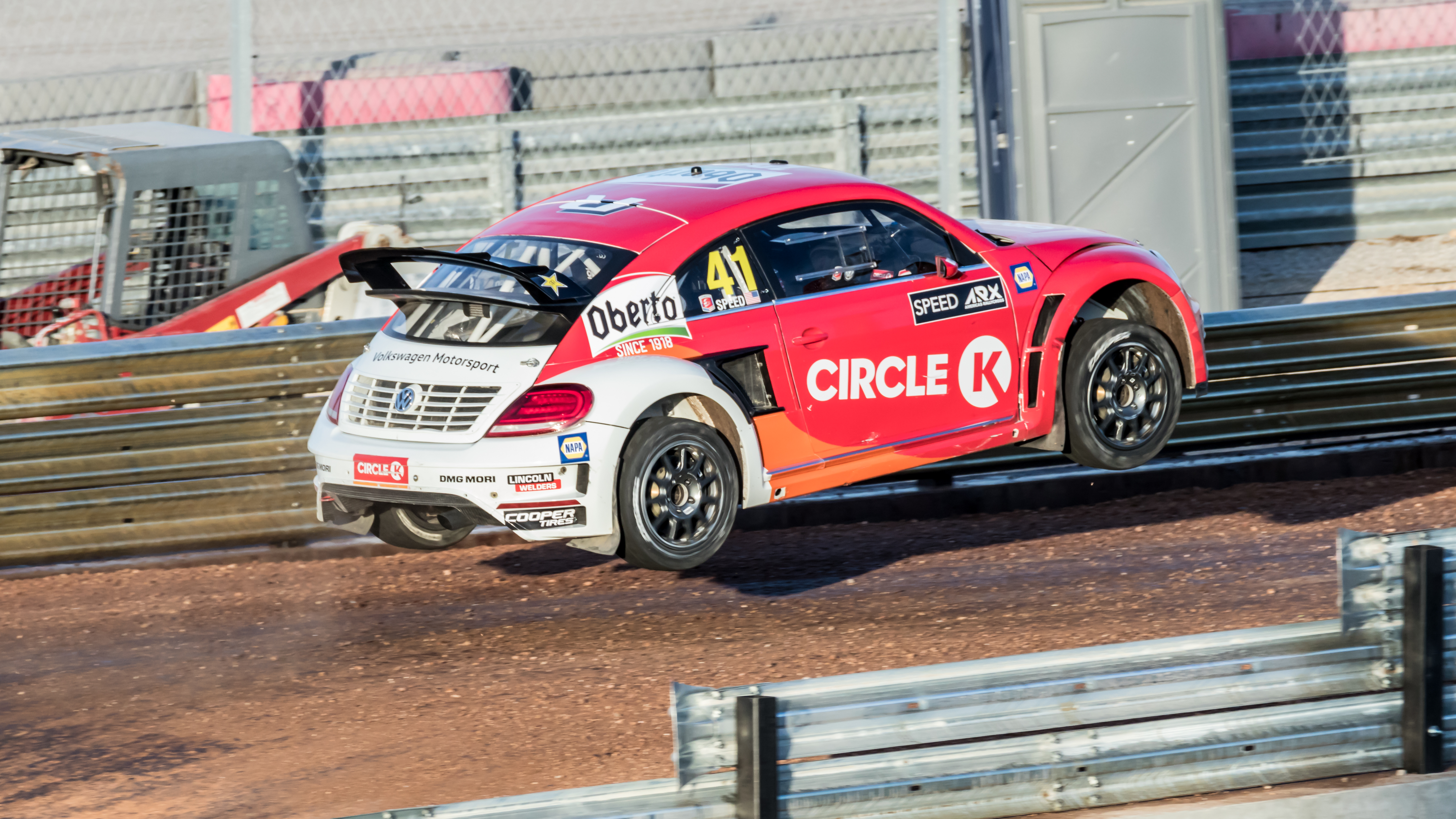
Speed competing in the 2018 Americas Rallycross Championship

Speed won a gold medal at the 2013 X Games in Foz do Iguaçu in his first ever rallycross race. He won a second gold medal at round 8 of the Global RallyCross Championship in Charlotte Motor Speedway.

Speed joined Andretti Autosport in 2014 to drive a factory-backed Volkswagen Polo and later a Volkswagen Beetle. He finished third in points with three wins. He won the Global RallyCross Championship in 2015, 2016, and 2017, collecting a total of ten wins. In 2018, he won the Americas Rallycross Championship (ARX), also with Volkswagen Andretti Rallycross, claiming two wins.

On November 1, 2018, Speed announced that he would be joining Subaru Rally Team USA for the 2019 Americas Rallycross Championship. In August 2019, he fractured his vertebrae in a crash at the Nitro World Games 2019, forcing him to miss the remainder of the ARX season. At the time of his injury, he was the points leader.

Speed returned with the Subaru factory team for the 2021 Nitro Rallycross Championship, where he was runner-up with one win and four podiums in five races.

== Formula E ==
Speed competed for Andretti Autosport in the fifth race of the 2014–15 Formula E season in Miami. He raced alongside Jean-Éric Vergne, replacing Marco Andretti. On March 14, 2015, Speed qualified 11th and charged through the field to finish second behind race winner Nicolas Prost.

== Racing record ==
=== Career summary ===
Season	Series	Team name	Races	Poles	Wins	Points	Position
2001	US Formula Russell	?	?	?	?	?	**1st**
2002	Formula Dodge National Championship	?	11	5	2	135	**3rd**
2002	Star Mazda North American Championship	Doublefield Racing	4	2	1	218	18th
2003	British Formula 3 International Series	Alan Docking Racing	14	0	0	3	23rd
2004	Formula Renault 2000 Eurocup	Motopark Academy	16	9	8	402	**1st**
2004	Formula Renault 2000 Germany	Motopark Academy	14	3	4	293	**1st**
2004	Asian Formula Renault Challenge	Shangsai FRD GT Tires Team	2	1	1	N/A	NC†
2005	Formula One	Red Bull Racing	Test driver				
2005	GP2 Series	iSport International	23	1	0	67.5	**3rd**
2005–06	A1 Grand Prix	A1 Team USA	6	0	0	23‡	16th‡
2006	Formula One	Scuderia Toro Rosso	18	0	0	0	20th
2007	Formula One	Scuderia Toro Rosso	10	0	0	0	21st
2007	ARCA Re/Max Series	Eddie Sharp Racing	1	0	0	195	111th
2008	ARCA Re/Max Series	Eddie Sharp Racing	21	3	4	5150	5th
2008	NASCAR Craftsman Truck Series	Morgan-Dollar Motorsports	2	0	0	2058	21st
2008	NASCAR Craftsman Truck Series	Bill Davis Racing	14	1	1	2058	21st
2008	NASCAR Sprint Cup Series	Team Red Bull	5	0	0	366	55th
2009	NASCAR Sprint Cup Series	Team Red Bull	33	0	0	2690	35th
2009	NASCAR Sprint Cup Series	NEMCO Motorsports	2	0	0	2690	35th
2009	NASCAR Nationwide Series	Michael Waltrip Racing	13	0	0	1591	34th
2009	Rolex Sports Car Series - DP	Chip Ganassi Racing	1	0	0	21	62nd
2010	NASCAR Sprint Cup Series	Team Red Bull	36	0	0	3178	30th
2011	NASCAR Sprint Cup Series	Max Q Motorsports	3	0	0	0	68th†
2011	NASCAR Sprint Cup Series	Whitney Motorsports	10	0	0	0	68th†
2011	NASCAR Nationwide Series	Kevin Harvick Incorporated	1	0	0	53	59th
2011	NASCAR Nationwide Series	Key Motorsports	4	0	0	53	59th
2011	IndyCar Series	Dragon Racing	0	0	0	0	NC
2012	NASCAR Sprint Cup Series	Hamilton Means Racing	0	0	0	124	42nd
2012	NASCAR Sprint Cup Series	Leavine Family Racing	11	0	0	124	42nd
2012	NASCAR Sprint Cup Series	Go Green Racing	2	0	0	124	42nd
2012	NASCAR Nationwide Series	The Motorsports Group	11	0	0	0	140th†
2013	NASCAR Sprint Cup Series	Leavine Family Racing	14	0	0	99	41st
2013	Global RallyCross Championship	Olsbergs MSE	9	N/A	2	94	5th
2014	Global RallyCross Championship	Volkswagen Andretti Rallycross	10	N/A	3	344	**3rd**
2014	Lamborghini Super Trofeo North America	Jota Corse	2	1	0	0	NC†
2014–15	Formula E	Andretti Autosport	4	0	0	18	15th
2015	Global RallyCross Championship	Volkswagen Andretti Rallycross	12	N/A	2	456	**1st**
2016	Global RallyCross Championship	Volkswagen Andretti Rallycross	11	N/A	4	571	**1st**
2016	Audi Sport TT Cup	Audi Sport	2	0	0	0	NC†
2017	Global RallyCross Championship	Volkswagen Andretti Rallycross	12	N/A	4	826	**1st**
2018	Americas Rallycross Championship	Volkswagen Andretti Rallycross	4	N/A	2	112	**1st**
2019	Americas Rallycross Championship	Subaru Rally Team USA	4	N/A	1	100	6th
2021	Nitro Rallycross Championship	Subaru Motorsports USA	5	N/A	1	219	**2nd**
2021	SRX Series	N/A	2	0	0	64	11th
2026	Nürburgring Langstrecken-Serie - Cup3	Mühlner Motorsport					

^{†} Ineligible for championship points.
^{‡} Includes points scored by other drivers for A1 Team USA.

=== Single-seater racing ===
==== Complete British Formula Three Championship results ====
(key) (Races in bold indicate pole position; races in italics indicate fastest lap)

British Formula 3 International Series results
Year	Entrant	Chassis	Engine	1	2	3	4	5	6	7	8	9	10	11	12	13	14	15	16	17	18	19	20	21	22	23	24	DC	Points
2003	Alan Docking Racing	Dallara F303	Mugen-Honda	DON1; 1; 26	DON1; 2; 27	SNE; 1; 9	SNE; 2 Ret	CRO; 1; 13	CRO; 2; 16	KNO; 1; 14	KNO; 2; 18	SIL; 1; 14	SIL; 2; 11	CAS; 1; 10	CAS; 2; 18	OUL; 1; 13	OUL; 2; 17	ROC; 1 DNS	ROC; 2 DNS	THR; 1	THR; 2	SPA; 1	SPA; 2	DON2; 1	DON2; 2	BRH; 1; 16	BRH; 2 Ret	23rd	3

==== Complete Formula Renault 2000 Germany results ====
(key) (Races in bold indicate pole position; races in italics indicate fastest lap)

Formula Renault 2000 Germany results
Year	Entrant	1	2	3	4	5	6	7	8	9	10	11	12	13	14	DC	Points
2004	Motopark Oschersleben	OSC; 1; 18	OSC; 2; 1	ASS; 1; 3	ASS; 2; 1	SAL; 1; 2	SAL; 2; 2	SAC; 1; 2	SAC; 2; 1	NÜR; 1; 3	**NÜR**; **2** Ret	LAU; 1; 2	LAU; 2; 8	**OSC**; **1**; 3	**OSC**; **2**; 1	1st	293

==== Complete Formula Renault 2000 Eurocup results ====
(key) (Races in bold indicate pole position; races in italics indicate fastest lap)

Formula Renault 2000 Eurocup results
Year	Entrant	1	2	3	4	5	6	7	8	9	10	11	12	13	14	15	16	17	DC	Points
2004	Motopark Academy	**MNZ**; **1**; 2	**MNZ**; **2**; 12	VAL; 1; 7	VAL; 2 DSQ	MAG; 1; 7	MAG; 2; 3	**HOC**; **1**; 1	HOC; 2; 1	**BRN**; **1**; 1	**BRN**; **2**; 1	**DON**; **1**; 4	DON; 2; 7	**SPA**; 1	IMO; 1; 2	IMO; 2; 1	**OSC**; **1**; 1	**OSC**; **2**; 1	1st	370

==== Complete GP2 Series results ====
(key) (Races in bold indicate pole position; races in italics indicate fastest lap)

GP2 Series results
Year	Entrant	1	2	3	4	5	6	7	8	9	10	11	12	13	14	15	16	17	18	19	20	21	22	23	DC	Points
2005	iSport International	IMO; FEA; 3	IMO; SPR; Ret	**CAT**; **FEA**; 2	CAT; SPR; 3	MON; FEA; 4	NÜR; FEA; 16	NÜR; SPR; 12	MAG; FEA; 15	MAG; SPR; 18	SIL; FEA; 4	SIL; SPR; 2	HOC; FEA; 4	HOC; SPR; 3	HUN; FEA; Ret	HUN; SPR; 19	IST; FEA; 5	IST; SPR; 4	MNZ; FEA; Ret	MNZ; SPR; 15	SPA; FEA; 4	SPA; SPR; 4	BHR; FEA; Ret	BHR; SPR; 19	3rd	67.5

==== Complete Formula One results ====
(key)

Formula One results
Year	Entrant	Chassis	Engine	1	2	3	4	5	6	7	8	9	10	11	12	13	14	15	16	17	18	19	WDC	Points
2005	Red Bull Racing	Red Bull RB1	Cosworth TJ2005 3.0 V10	AUS	MAL	BHR	SMR	ESP	MON	EUR	CAN; TD	USA; TD	FRA	GBR	GER	HUN	TUR	ITA	BEL	BRA	JPN	CHN	–	–
2006	Scuderia Toro Rosso	Toro Rosso STR1	Cosworth TJ2006 3.0 V10 14 Series	BHR; 13	MAL; Ret	AUS; 9	SMR; 15	EUR; 11	ESP; Ret	MON; 13	GBR; Ret	CAN; 10	USA; Ret	FRA; 10	GER; 12	HUN; 11	TUR; 13	ITA; 13	CHN; 14	JPN; 18^{†}	BRA; 11		20th	0
2007	Scuderia Toro Rosso	Toro Rosso STR2	Ferrari 056 2.4 V8	AUS; Ret	MAL; 14	BHR; Ret	ESP; Ret	MON; 9	CAN; Ret	USA; 13	FRA; Ret	GBR; Ret	EUR; Ret	HUN	TUR	ITA	BEL	JPN	CHN	BRA			21st	0

^{†} Driver did not finish the Grand Prix but was classified as he completed over 90% of the race distance.

==== Complete A1 Grand Prix results ====
(key)

A1 Grand Prix results
Year	Entrant	1	2	3	4	5	6	7	8	9	10	11	12	13	14	15	16	17	18	19	20	21	22	DC	Points
2005–06	USA	GBR; SPR; 11	GBR; FEA; Ret	GER; SPR; Ret	GER; FEA; Ret	POR; SPR; 13	POR; FEA; 4	AUS; SPR	AUS; FEA	MYS; SPR	MYS; FEA	UAE; SPR	UAE; FEA	RSA; SPR	RSA; FEA	IDN; SPR	IDN; FEA	MEX; SPR	MEX; FEA	USA; SPR	USA; FEA	CHN; SPR	CHN; FEA	16th	23

==== American open–wheel racing results ====
(key) (Races in bold indicate pole position) (Races in italics indicate fastest lap)

===== IndyCar =====
IndyCar Series results
Year	Team	No.	Chassis	Engine	1	2	3	4	5	6	7	8	9	10	11	12	13	14	15	16	17	18	Rank	Points	Ref
2011	Dragon Racing	20	Dallara	Honda	STP	ALA	LBH	SAO	INDY; DNQ	TXS1	TXS2	MIL	IOW	TOR	EDM	MDO	NHM	SNM	BAL	MOT	KTY	LVS	NC	-	

==== Indianapolis 500 ====
Year	Chassis	Engine	Start	Finish	Team
2011	Dallara	Honda	DNQ		Dragon Racing

==== Complete Formula E results ====
(key) (Races in bold indicate pole position; races in italics indicate fastest lap)

Formula E results
Year	Team	Chassis	Powertrain	1	2	3	4	5	6	7	8	9	10	11	Pos	Points
2014–15	Andretti Autosport	Spark SRT01-e	SRT01-e	BEI	PUT	PDE	BUE	MIA; 2	LBH; Ret	MCO; 12	BER; 13	MSC	LDN	LDN	15th	18

=== NASCAR ===
(key) (Bold – Pole position awarded by qualifying time. Italics – Pole position earned by points standings or practice time. * – Most laps led.)

==== Sprint Cup Series ====
NASCAR Sprint Cup Series results
Year	Team	No.	Make	1	2	3	4	5	6	7	8	9	10	11	12	13	14	15	16	17	18	19	20	21	22	23	24	25	26	27	28	29	30	31	32	33	34	35	36	NSCC	Pts	Ref
2008	Team Red Bull	82	Toyota	DAY	CAL	LVS	ATL	BRI	MAR	TEX	PHO	TAL	RCH	DAR	CLT	DOV	POC	MCH	SON	NHA	DAY	CHI	IND	POC	GLN	MCH	BRI	CAL	RCH	NHA	DOV	KAN	TAL	CLT; DNQ						55th	366	
2008	Team Red Bull	84	Toyota																																MAR; 30	ATL; 34	TEX; 33	PHO; 41		55th	366	
2008	Team Red Bull	83	Toyota																																				HOM; 16	55th	366	
2009	Team Red Bull	82	Toyota	DAY; 35	CAL; 41	LVS; 21	ATL; 35	BRI; 28	MAR; 39	TEX; DNQ	PHO; 34	TAL; 5	RCH; 33	DAR; DNQ	CLT; 18	DOV; 37	POC; 32	MCH; 37	SON; DNQ	NHA; 36	DAY; 31	CHI; 36	IND; 31	POC; 23	GLN; 22	MCH; 34	BRI; 15	ATL; 24	RCH; 36	NHA; 31	DOV; 25	KAN; 27	CAL; 21	CLT; 28	MAR; 31	TAL; 27	TEX; 18	PHO; 33	HOM; 27	35th	2690	
2009	NEMCO Motorsports	87	Toyota											DAR; 26					SON; 37																					35th	2690	
2010	Team Red Bull	82	Toyota	DAY; 19	CAL; 11	LVS; 22	ATL; 10	BRI; 31	MAR; 33	PHO; 21	TEX; 16	TAL; 15	RCH; 35	DAR; 28	DOV; 23	CLT; 30	POC; 20	MCH; 28	SON; 18	NHA; 27	DAY; 10	CHI; 30	IND; 25	POC; 26	GLN; 43	MCH; 25	BRI; 33	ATL; 34	RCH; 24	NHA; 36	DOV; 32	KAN; 19	CAL; 24	CLT; 19	MAR; 23	TAL; 29	TEX; 27	PHO; 35	HOM; 23	30th	3178	
2011	Max Q Motorsports	37	Ford	DAY	PHO	LVS	BRI	CAL	MAR	TEX	TAL	RCH	DAR	DOV	CLT	KAN	POC	MCH	SON	DAY	KEN	NHA	IND; 39	POC; 40	GLN; 39	MCH														68th	0^{1}	
2011	Whitney Motorsports	46	Ford																								BRI; 42	ATL; 32	RCH; 43	CHI; 35	NHA; 41	DOV; 42	KAN; 33	CLT; DNQ	TAL; DNQ	MAR; 37	TEX; 39	PHO; 39	HOM; DNQ	68th	0^{1}	
2012	Hamilton Means Racing	52	Toyota	DAY	PHO	LVS	BRI	CAL	MAR; DNQ																															42nd	89	
2012	Leavine Family Racing	95	Ford							TEX; 43	KAN	RCH; 43	TAL		CLT; 37				SON; 25	KEN; 39	DAY	NHA	IND; 38	POC	GLN; 17	MCH	BRI; DNQ	ATL; 37	RCH	CHI; 41	NHA; 38	DOV; 40	TAL	CLT; 40	KAN; 34	MAR; 37	TEX; 30	PHO	HOM	42nd	89	
2012	Go Green Racing	79	Ford											DAR; 42		DOV; 43	POC	MCH																						42nd	89	
2013	Leavine Family Racing	95	Ford	DAY; 23	PHO; 41	LVS; 41	BRI; 40	CAL	MAR; 41	TEX; DNQ	KAN	RCH	TAL; 9	DAR; 41	CLT; 43	DOV	POC	MCH	SON	KEN	DAY; 28	NHA	IND; DNQ	POC	GLN	MCH; 41	BRI; 40	ATL; 43	RCH	CHI	NHA	DOV	KAN	CLT	TAL	MAR	TEX	PHO	HOM	41st	99	

===== Daytona 500 =====
Year	Team	Manufacturer	Start	Finish
2009	Team Red Bull	Toyota	38	35
2010	Team Red Bull	Toyota	30	19
2013	Leavine Family Racing	Ford	31	23

==== Nationwide Series ====
NASCAR Nationwide Series results
Year	Team	No.	Make	1	2	3	4	5	6	7	8	9	10	11	12	13	14	15	16	17	18	19	20	21	22	23	24	25	26	27	28	29	30	31	32	33	34	35	NNSC	Pts	Ref
2009	Michael Waltrip Racing	99	Toyota	DAY	CAL	**LVS**; 40	BRI; 8	TEX	NSH	PHO	TAL	RCH; 27	DAR; 13	CLT; 11	DOV; 7	NSH	KEN	MLW	NHA; 8	DAY	CHI	GTY	IRP	IOW	GLN; 10	MCH	BRI	CGV	ATL	RCH; 10	DOV; 8	KAN; 8	CAL; 27	CLT	MEM	TEX	PHO	HOM; 9	34th	1591	
2011	Kevin Harvick Inc	33	Chevy	DAY	PHO	LVS	BRI	CAL	TEX	TAL	NSH	RCH	DAR	DOV	IOW	CLT	CHI	MCH	ROA	DAY	KEN	NHA	NSH	IRP	IOW	GLN	CGV; 6	BRI	ATL	RCH	CHI	DOV	KAN						59th	53	
2011	Key Motorsports	47	Chevy																															CLT; 41	TEX; 43	PHO; 37			59th	53	
2011	Key Motorsports	42	Chevy																																		HOM; 41		59th	53	
2012	The Motorsports Group	47	Chevy	DAY; DNQ	PHO; 42	LVS; 42	BRI; 41	CAL; 41	TEX; 41	RCH; 40	TAL; 42	DAR; 42	IOW	CLT; 42	DOV; 38	MCH	ROA	KEN; 43	DAY	NHA	CHI	IND	IOW	GLN	CGV	BRI	ATL	RCH	CHI	KEN	DOV	CLT	KAN	TEX	PHO	HOM			140th	0^{1}	

==== Craftsman Truck Series ====
NASCAR Craftsman Truck Series results
Year	Team	No.	Make	1	2	3	4	5	6	7	8	9	10	11	12	13	14	15	16	17	18	19	20	21	22	23	24	25	NCTC	Pts	Ref
2008	Morgan-Dollar Motorsports	46	Chevy	DAY	CAL	ATL; 27	MAR; 10																						21st	2058	
2008	Bill Davis Racing	22	Toyota					KAN; 8	CLT; 33	MFD; 15	DOV; 1	TEX; 26	MCH; 3	MLW	MEM	KEN	IRP	NSH	**BRI**; 3	GTW	NHA	LVS; 21	TAL; 15	MAR; 7	ATL; 5	TEX; 10	PHO; 14	HOM; 10	21st	2058	

^{*} Season still in progress
^{1} Ineligible for series points

=== ARCA Menards Series ===
(key) (Bold – Pole position awarded by qualifying time. Italics – Pole position earned by points standings or practice time. * – Most laps led.)

ARCA Racing Series results
Year	Team	No.	Make	1	2	3	4	5	6	7	8	9	10	11	12	13	14	15	16	17	18	19	20	21	22	23	ARSC	Pts	Ref
2007	Julie Bowsher	21	Toyota	DAY	USA	NSH	SLM	KAN	WIN	KEN	TOL	IOW	POC	MCH	BLN	KEN	POC	NSH	ISF	MIL	GTW	DSF	CHI	SLM	TAL; 7	TOL	111th	195	
2008	Eddie Sharp Racing	2	Toyota	DAY; 39	SLM; 5	IOW; 6	KEN; 1	CAR; 35	KEN; 2	TOL; 6	**POC**; 2	**MCH**; 4	CAY; 8	KEN; 1*	BLN; 1	**POC**; 2*	NSH; 1	ISF; 8	DSF; 8	CHI; 3	SLM; 8	NJE; 8	TAL; 23	TOL; 34			5th	5150	

=== Rallycross ===
(key)

==== Complete Global Rallycross Championship results ====
Global RallyCross Championship results
Year	Entrant	Car	1	2	3	4	5	6	7	8	9	10	11	12	GRC	Points
2013	OMSE2	Ford Fiesta	BRA; 1	MUN; 9	MUN; 14	LOU; 9	BRI; 13	IRW; 9	ATL; 7	CHA; 1	VEG; 9				5th	94
2014	Volkswagen Andretti Rallycross	Volkswagen Polo	BAR; 1	AUS; 1	WDC; 6	NYC; 9	CHA; 5	DAY; 10	LOS; 1	LOS; 6					3rd	344
2014	Volkswagen Andretti Rallycross	Volkswagen Beetle									SEA; 6	VEG; 4			3rd	344
2015	Volkswagen Andretti Rallycross	Volkswagen Beetle	FTA; 2	DAY; DNS	DAY; 9	MCAS; DNS	DET; 2	DET; 2	WDC; 7	LOS; 1	LOS; 1	BAR; 2	BAR; 2	VEG; 3	1st	456
2016	Volkswagen Andretti Rallycross	Volkswagen Beetle	PHX; 5	PHX; 2	DAL; 4	DAY; 7	DAY; 2	MCAS; 1	MCAS; C	WDC; 1	ATL; 1	SEA; 4	LOS; 1	LOS; 2	1st	571
2017	Volkswagen Andretti Rallycross	Volkswagen Beetle	MEM; 1	LOU; 3	THO; 2	THO; 2	OTT; 10	OTT; 2	INDY; 1	ATL; 1	ATL; 1	SEA; 2	SEA; 2	LOS; 2	1st	826

==== Complete Americas Rallycross Championship results ====
Year	Entrant	Car	1	2	3	4	5	6	Rank	Points
2018	Volkswagen Andretti Rallycross	Volkswagen Beetle	SIL; 2	AUS1; 1	TRO; 1	AUS2; 2			1st	112
2019	Subaru Rally Team USA	Subaru Impreza WRX STi	MO1; 1	GTW1; 4	GTW2; 2	TRO; 3	AUS	MO2	6th	100

==== Complete Nitro Rallycross results ====
Year	Entrant	Car	1	2	3	4	5	Rank	Points
2021	Subaru Motorsports USA	Subaru WRX STi	UTA; 5	ERX; 1	WHP; 3	GHR; 2	FIRM; 3	2nd	219

=== Superstar Racing Experience ===
(key) * – Most laps led. ^{1} – Heat 1 winner. ^{2} – Heat 2 winner.

Superstar Racing Experience results
Year	No.	1	2	3	4	5	6	SRXC	Pts
2021	41	STA	KNX	ELD; 6	IRP; 3^{1}	SLG	NSV	11th	64

^{*} Season still in progress

== See also ==
- List of people diagnosed with ulcerative colitis

Sporting positions
Preceded by Esteban Guerrieri	Eurocup Formula Renault 2.0; Champion; 2004	Succeeded by Kamui Kobayashi
Preceded by Ryan Sharp	German Formula Renault; Champion; 2004	Succeeded by Pekka Saarinen
Preceded by Joni Wiman	Global RallyCross Championship; Supercar Champion; 2015–2017	Succeeded by None (Series ended)
Preceded by Inaugural	Americas Rallycross Championship; Supercar Champion; 2018	Succeeded by Tanner Foust
