= 2018 Americas Rallycross Championship =

The 2018 Americas Rallycross Championship is the first season of the Americas Rallycross Championship, a feeder championship to the FIA World Rallycross Championship representing North America. This championship can be seen as the spiritual successor to the Red Bull Global Rallycross Championship, which folded in early 2018. The season consists of four rounds across two categories; Supercar and ARX2. The season commenced on 27 May with the special round at Silverstone in the UK, and culminated on 30 September in Austin at the Circuit of the Americas.

== Calendar ==
Rnd.	Event	Dates	Venue	Class	Winner	Team	Report
1	(United Kingdom) World RX of Great Britain	27 May	Silverstone Circuit, Silverstone	Supercar	(United States) Tanner Foust	(United States) Volkswagen Andretti Rallycross	Report
2	(United States) Dirtfish ARX of COTA	14 July	Circuit of the Americas, Austin	Supercar	(United States) Scott Speed	(United States) Volkswagen Andretti Rallycross	Report
2	(United States) Dirtfish ARX of COTA	14 July	Circuit of the Americas, Austin	ARX2	(United States) Conner Martell	(United States) Dirtfish	Report
3	World RX of Canada	4–5 August	Circuit Trois-Rivières, Trois-Rivières	Supercar	(United States) Scott Speed	(United States) Volkswagen Andretti Rallycross	Report
3	World RX of Canada	4–5 August	Circuit Trois-Rivières, Trois-Rivières	ARX2 (Day 1)	(United States) Conner Martell	(United States) Dirtfish	Report
3	World RX of Canada	4–5 August	Circuit Trois-Rivières, Trois-Rivières	ARX2 (Day 2)	(United States) Conner Martell	(United States) Dirtfish	Report
4	World RX of the United States	30 September	Circuit of the Americas, Austin	Supercar	(United States) Tanner Foust	(United States) Volkswagen Andretti Rallycross	Report
4	World RX of the United States	30 September	Circuit of the Americas, Austin	ARX2 (Day 1)	(United States) Alex Keyes	(United States) Robbie Buhl	Report
4	World RX of the United States	30 September	Circuit of the Americas, Austin	ARX2 (Day 2)	(United States) Alex Keyes	(United States) Robbie Buhl	Report

== Entries ==
=== Supercar ===
Americas RX Teams
Constructor	Entrant	Car	No.	Drivers	Rounds
BMW	(United Kingdom) Xite Racing	BMW MINI Cooper	42	(United Kingdom) Oliver Bennett	2–4
Citroën	(United Kingdom) LD Motorsports	Citroën DS3	33	(United Kingdom) Liam Doran	1, 4
Renault	(France) GC Kompetition	Renault Mégane R.S	33	(United Kingdom) Liam Doran	1, 4
Ford	(United States) Hoonigan Racing Division	Ford Focus RS RX	43	(United States) Ken Block	2–4
Ford	(United States) Hoonigan Racing Division	Ford Focus RS RX	100	(Canada) Steve Arpin	2–4
Peugeot	(United Kingdom) Albatec Racing	Peugeot 208	26	(United Kingdom) Andy Scott	1
Renault	(France) G-Fors	Renault Clio R.S.	121	(France) Philippe Maloigne	1
SEAT	(Germany) Münnich Motorsport	SEAT Ibiza	44	(Germany) Timo Scheider	1
SEAT	(Germany) Münnich Motorsport	SEAT Ibiza	77	(Germany) René Münnich	1
Ford	(Germany) Münnich Motorsport	Ford Fiesta	77	(Germany) René Münnich	3
Subaru	(United States) Subaru Rally Team USA	Subaru Impreza WRX STi	18	(Sweden) Patrik Sandell	All
Subaru	(United States) Subaru Rally Team USA	Subaru Impreza WRX STi	55	(Australia) Chris Atkinson	All
Subaru	(United States) Subaru Rally Team USA	Subaru Impreza WRX STi	75	(Isle of Man) David Higgins	1
Subaru	(United States) Subaru Rally Team USA	Subaru Impreza WRX STi	199	(United States) Travis Pastrana	2
Subaru	(United States) Subaru Rally Team USA	Subaru Impreza WRX STi	12	(Canada) Jacques Villeneuve	3
Subaru	(United States) Subaru Rally Team USA	Subaru Impreza WRX STi	57	(Finland) Toomas Heikkinen	4
Volkswagen	(United States) Volkswagen Andretti Rallycross	Volkswagen Beetle	34	(United States) Tanner Foust	All
Volkswagen	(United States) Volkswagen Andretti Rallycross	Volkswagen Beetle	41	(United States) Scott Speed	All

=== ARX2 ===
ARX2 Teams
Constructor	Entrant	Car	No.	Drivers	Rounds
OMSE	(United States) Dreyer & Reinbold Racing	Olsbergs MSE RX2	2	(United States) Cabot Bigham	2–3
OMSE	(United States) Dreyer & Reinbold Racing	Olsbergs MSE RX2	3	(United States) Travis PeCoy	All
OMSE	(United States) Dreyer & Reinbold Racing	Olsbergs MSE RX2	24	(United States) Matt Carpoff	All
OMSE	(United States) Dreyer & Reinbold Racing	Olsbergs MSE RX2	44	(United States) Christian Brooks	All
OMSE	(United States) Robbie Buhl	Olsbergs MSE RX2	4	(United States) Alex Keyes	All
OMSE	(United States) Dirtfish	Olsbergs MSE RX2	21	(United States) Conner Martell	All
OMSE	(United States) Dirtfish	Olsbergs MSE RX2	25	(United States) James Rimmer	All
OMSE	(United States) Dirtfish	Olsbergs MSE RX2	35	(Jamaica) Fraser McConnell	All
OMSE	(United States) Dirtfish	Olsbergs MSE RX2	77	(United States) Scott Anderson	All
OMSE	(United States) Keatts Motorsport	Olsbergs MSE RX2	53	(United States) Cole Keatts	All

== Results and standings ==
Championship points are scored as follows:

	Position															
Round	1st	2nd	3rd	4th	5th	6th	7th	8th	9th	10th	11th	12th	13th	14th	15th	16th
Heats	16	15	14	13	12	11	10	9	8	7	6	5	4	3	2	1
Semi-Finals	6	5	4	3	2	1										
Final	8	5	4	3	2	1										

- A red background denotes drivers who did not advance from the round

=== Supercar ===
(key)

Pos.	Driver	GBR (United Kingdom)	USA1 (United States)	CAN (Canada)	USA2 (United States)	Points
1	(United States) Scott Speed	2	1	1	2	112
2	(United States) Tanner Foust	1	3	2	1	107
3	(Sweden) Patrik Sandell	4	5	4	5	75
4	(United States) Ken Block		2	3	6	68
5	(Australia) Chris Atkinson	8	6	5	7	66
6	(Canada) Steve Arpin		7	6	3	54
7	(United Kingdom) Oliver Bennett		8	9	9	32
8	(United Kingdom) Liam Doran	3			8	30
9	(Germany) René Münnich	7		7		29
10	(Germany) Timo Scheider	5				21
11	(United States) Travis Pastrana		4			17
12	(Finland) Toomas Heikkinen				4	17
13	(Isle of Man) David Higgins	6				16
14	(Canada) Jacques Villeneuve			8		12
15	(United Kingdom) Andy Scott	9				10
16	(France) Philippe Maloigne	10				9
Pos.	Driver	GBR (United Kingdom)	USA1 (United States)	CAN (Canada)	USA2 (United States)	Points

=== ARX2 ===
(key)

Pos.	Driver	USA1 (United States)	CAN1 (Canada)	CAN2 (Canada)	USA2 (United States)	USA3 (United States)	Points
1	(United States) Conner Martell	1	1	1	2	6	131
2	(United States) Christian Brooks	2	2	2	5	3	114
3	(United States) Alex Keyes	5	8	3	1	1	110
4	(Jamaica) Fraser McConnell	4	9	6	4	2	96
5	(United States) Scott Anderson	6	7	5	3	7	86
6	(United States) Cole Keatts	3	6	8	7	5	82
7	(United States) Matt Carpoff	8	10	7	8	9	60
8	(United States) Travis PeCoy	9	3	9^{a}	9	8	56
9	(United States) James Rimmer	7	5	4			54
10	(United States) Cabot Bigham		4	10^{a}	6	4	51
Pos.	Driver	USA1 (United States)	CAN1 (Canada)	CAN2 (Canada)	USA2 (United States)	USA3 (United States)	Points

^{a} Did not finish the event and so got no points.

== See also ==
- 2018 in rallycross
