= Americas Rallycross Championship =

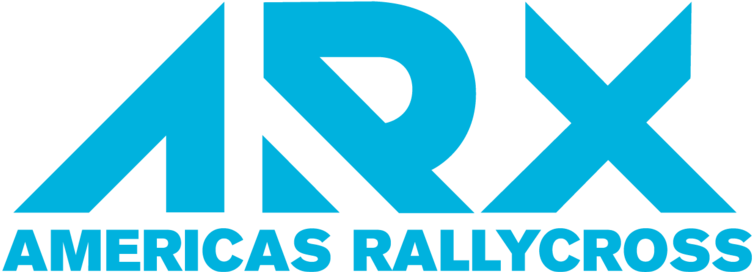
- Country: United States; Canada
- Region: North America
- Inaugural season: 2018
- Folded: 2019
- Tire suppliers: Cooper Tire
- Last Drivers' champion: (United States) Tanner Foust
- Last Teams' champion: (United States) Subaru Rally Team USA

The Americas Rallycross Championship, also known as ARX Rallycross, was an American rallycross series organized by IMG Motorsport. Formed in 2018, it was a feeder series to the FIA World Rallycross Championship. After two seasons, ARX shut down in late 2019.

== History ==
In March 2018, IMG founded the Americas Rallycross Championship as a competitor to the GRC Rallycross until the latter folded due to financial issues. Former GRC teams like Andretti Autosport and Subaru Rally Team USA moved to ARX.

ARX's inaugural race was held in May at Silverstone Circuit as a support to the World RX of Great Britain; Tanner Foust won the event. The first American round took place in July at Circuit of the Americas, won by Scott Speed. Speed ended the 2018 season as the champion, his fourth consecutive title in a rallycross series. The series also hosted the ARX2 class, a second-tier league with spec Ford Fiestas. In 2019, ARX conducted a six-race schedule with rounds on new rallycross courses at Mid-Ohio Sports Car Course and World Wide Technology Raceway at Gateway. Foust went on to win the championship.

On November 15, 2019, IMG announced the series would fold after just two seasons following a failed search for commercial partners.

== Format ==
Each event consists of the following:

- Four qualifying heats: Each heat has five cars at most in a four-lap race. Starting positions for the first heat are determined by random draw, while the second through fourth heats use the first event's race times to set the grid.
- Two Semi-Finals: The top twelve drivers in the heats advance to the Semi-Finals, with odd-numbered drivers in the first and even in the second.
- Final: The top three drivers in the semi-finals advance to the Final.

== Champions ==
Season	ARX Champion			ARX2 Champion	
Season	Driver	Team	Car	Driver	Team
2018	(United States) Scott Speed	(United States) Volkswagen Andretti Rallycross	Volkswagen Beetle	(United States) Conner Martell	(United States) DirtFish Motorsports
2019	(United States) Tanner Foust	(United States) Volkswagen Andretti Rallycross	Volkswagen Beetle	(Jamaica) Fraser McConnell	(United States) DirtFish Motorsports
