= Curb Agajanian Performance Group =

American motorsports team

Curb-Agajanian Racing
- Owner(s): Mike Curb; Cary Agajanian
- Principal(s): Mike Curb
- Series: IndyCar Series
- Race drivers: IndyCar Series: 27. Kyle Kirkwood; 60. Felix Rosenqvist; 66. Marcus Armstrong
- Manufacturer: IndyCar Series: Honda
- Opened: 1980

Career
- Debut: 2001 XM Satellite Radio Indy 200 (Phoenix)
- Latest race: 2022 Sonsio Grand Prix at Road America (Road America)
- Drivers' Championships: 13 (Silver Crown, 2010, 2011, 2012, 2013, Sprint Car 2012, 2013, Midget 2011, 2013, 2014, 2016, 2017, 2018, 2021), USAC
- Indy 500 victories: 3 (2011, 2016, 2026)
- Race victories: 6
- Pole positions: 7

The Curb Agajanian Performance Group is an American motorsports team, currently competing as a co-entrant in IndyCar and IMSA. It is owned by record executive Mike Curb and racing personality Cary Agajanian, the son of the late J. C. Agajanian, a race promoter and race car owner. It has fielded an IndyCar entry or co-entry in various races since 2001. Curb also was involved with NASCAR in both the Xfinity Series and Sprint Cup Series, owning Curb Racing from 1984 to 2011. Curb had several business partners in the NASCAR operation over the years, including Agajanian from 1998 to 2006.

CAPG has won three Indianapolis 500 races as a co-owner, in 2011 with Dan Wheldon, in 2016 with Alexander Rossi and in 2026 with Felix Rosenqvist.

== History ==
For the 2001 season, the team partnered with Beck Motorsports and returned to full-time competition with veteran driver Billy Boat. Boat finished 2nd at Nashville Superspeedway and finished 4th in points.

Boat went on to form Agajanian/Boat Racing with Cary Agajanian in 2002 and captured the pole at Nashville and finished 13th in points. In 2003 Agajanian joined forces with Sam Schmidt Motorsports at the Indy 500 to field a car for Richie Hearn who was knocked out by an accident.

In 2004, CURB/Agajanian/Beck Motorsports came into being and P. J. Jones drove their entry in the Indy 500 to a 28th place DNF. In 2005, the team fielded a last-minute Indy 500 entry for rookie Arie Luyendyk Jr., however the car never handled properly and Luyendyk's best speed was easily bumped by Felipe Giaffone, leaving Luyendyk and the C/A/B team the only entry bumped from the field that year.

The team merged with Team Leader Motorsports to field 2 cars for the 2006 Indianapolis 500. The first team with driver P. J. Jones was Beck Motorsports owned by Greg Beck which was founded in 1995. The second team driven by Stephan Gregoire was owned by Kent Baker which was founded in 1988. Both Baker and Beck had many years experience working with their own and various other Indy Car teams. They were joined by Cary Agajanian and Mike Curb of Curb Agajanian Motorsports. The two teams ended their partnership for 2007 with P. J. Jones competing for Team Leader Motorsports.

The team made a surprise entry into the 2007 XM Satellite Radio Indy 300 at Homestead-Miami Speedway and participated in it, the Kansas Speedway race and the Indy 500. Alex Barron drove in all 3 races and finished 15th in the Indy 500, 1 lap down.

The team made its 2008 debut at Twin Ring Motegi with Roger Yasukawa at the controls. Yasukawa also attempted to qualify the Curb Records car in the Indianapolis 500 as well but was bumped from the field.

In 2009, the team fielded a full-time IndyCar Series entry, beginning the season with NASCAR driver Stanton Barrett behind the wheel. Barrett and sports marketer Steve Sudler both joined as partners of the team and the new name was CURB/Agajanian/3G Racing (3 Guys Racing). Jaques Lazier was brought on to replace Barrett at Texas Motor Speedway after the team went home after a practice crash the previous week at the Milwaukee Mile. Lazier drove the next three oval races and Richard Antinucci was brought in to drive the remaining road and street course races of the schedule. Barrett drove at Twin Ring Motegi, where he had sponsorship, and Lazier drove on all other remaining ovals.

For the 2010 Indianapolis 500, Curb Agajanian provided a co-entry for KV Racing Technology driver Mario Moraes. For the 2011 Indianapolis 500, Curb Agajanian provided a co-entry for Bryan Herta Autosport driver and Dan Wheldon who went on to win the race, CAPG's first Indy 500 win.

For the 2016 IndyCar Series, Curb Agajanian provided a co-entry for Andretti Herta Autosport driver Alexander Rossi. Alexander Rossi won the 2016 Indy 500 in this ride, the second Indy 500 win for CAPG. They remain listed a co-entrant in the car, now driven and co-owned by Marco Andretti.

=== Driver history ===
==== Curb-Agajanian ====
- Tony Bettenhausen Jr. (1980)
- Mike Chandler (1983)
- Roger Mears (1980)

==== CURB/Agajanian/Beck ====
- Alex Barron (2007)
- Billy Boat (2001–2002)
- P. J. Jones (2004)
- Roger Yasukawa (2008)

==== Team Leader Motorsports ====
- Stephan Gregoire (2006)
- P. J. Jones (2006)

==== CURB/Agajanian/3G Racing ====
- Richard Antinucci (2009)
- Stanton Barrett (2009)
- Jaques Lazier (2009)

== USAC ==
=== 2012 ===
In 2012, Curb Agajanian became the first car owner to win all three USAC Championships in the same year (Silver Crown, Sprint Car and Midget).

=== 2013 ===
In 2013, Curb Agajanian again won all three USAC Championships in the same year (Silver Crown, Sprint Car and Midget).

== Indy Racing League/IndyCar Series results ==
(key) (Results in bold indicate pole position; results in italics indicate fastest lap)

Year	Chassis	Engine	Drivers	No.	1	2	3	4	5	6	7	8	9	10	11	12	13	14	15	16	17	18	19
Curb-Agajanian-Beck Motorsports
2001					PHX	HMS	ATL	INDY	TXS	PPIR	RIR	KAN	NSH	KTY	GAT	CHI	TXS						
2001	Dallara IR-01	Oldsmobile Aurora V8	Billy Boat	98	5	13	14	9	5	4	18	9	2	6	6	12	12						
Boat-Agajanian Racing
2002					HMS	PHX	FON	NAZ	INDY	TXS	PPIR	RIR	KAN	NSH	MCH	KTY	GAT	CHI	TXS				
2002	Dallara IR-02	Chevrolet Indy V8	Billy Boat	98	16	8	18	8	18	7	14	22	9	**14**	14	19	23	19	24				
Sam Schmidt Motorsports
2003					HMS	PHX	MOT	INDY	TXS	PPIR	RIR	KAN	NSH	MCH	GAT	KTY	NAZ	CHI	FON	TXS			
2003	G-Force	Toyota	Richie Hearn	99				28															
Curb-Agajanian-Beck Motorsports
2004					HMS	PHX	MOT	INDY	TXS	RIR	KAN	NSH	MIL	MCH	KTY	PPIR	NAZ	CHI	FON	TXS			
2004	Dallara IR-04	Chevrolet Indy V8	P. J. Jones	98				28															
2005					HMS	PHX	STP	MOT	INDY	TXS	RIR	KAN	NSH	MIL	MCH	KTY	PPIR	SNM	CHI	WGL	FON		
2005	Dallara IR-05	Chevrolet Indy V8	Arie Luyendyk Jr. **(R)**	98					DNQ														
Team Leader Motorsports
2006					HMS	STP	MOT	INDY	WGL	TXS	RIR	KAN	NSH	MIL	MCH	KTY	SNM	CHI					
2006	Panoz	Honda HI6R V8	Stéphan Grégoire	98				29															
2006	Panoz	Honda HI6R V8	P. J. Jones	99				19															
Curb-Agajanian-Beck Motorsports
2007					HMS	STP	MOT	KAN	INDY	MIL	TXS	IOW	RIR	WGL	NSH	MDO	MCH	KTY	SNM	DET	CHI		
2007	Dallara IR-05	Honda HI7R V8	Alex Barron	98	19			16	15														
2008					HMS	STP	MOT	LBH	KAN	INDY	MIL	TXS	IOW	RIR	WGL	NSH	MDO	EDM	KTY	SNM	DET	CHI	SRF^{1}
2008	Dallara IR-05	Honda HI7R V8	Roger Yasukawa	77			14																
2008	Dallara IR-05	Honda HI7R V8	Roger Yasukawa	99						DNQ													
CURB/Agaganian/3G Racing
2009					STP	LBH	KAN	INDY	MIL	TXS	IOW	RIR	WGL	TOR	EDM	KTY	MDO	SNM	CHI	MOT	HMS		
2009	Dallara IR-05	Honda HI7R V8	Stanton Barrett **(R)**	98	12	17	17	DNQ	DNS											19			
2009	Dallara IR-05	Honda HI7R V8	Jaques Lazier	98						18	13	20				23			19		23		
2009	Dallara IR-05	Honda HI7R V8	Richard Antinucci **(R)**	98									19	21	22		18	15					
KV Racing Technology
2010					SAO	STP	ALA	LBH	KAN	INDY		TXS	IOW	WGL	TOR	EDM	MDO	SNM	CHI	KTY	MOT	HMS	
2010					SAO	STP	ALA	LBH	KAN	QL	500	TXS	IOW	WGL	TOR	EDM	MDO	SNM	CHI	KTY	MOT	HMS	
2010	Dallara IR-05	Honda HI7R V8	Mario Moraes	32						13	31												
Bryan Herta Autosport
2011					STP	ALA	LBH	SAO	INDY		TXS		MIL	IOW	TOR	EDM	MDO	NHA	SNM	BAL	MOT	KTY	LSV
2011					STP	ALA	LBH	SAO	QL	500	R1	R2	MIL	IOW	TOR	EDM	MDO	NHA	SNM	BAL	MOT	KTY	LSV
2011	Dallara IR-05	Honda HI7R V8	Dan Wheldon	98					6	1													
Andretti Herta Autosport with Curb-Agajanian
2016					STP	PHX	LBH	ALA	IGP	INDY		DET		ROA	IOW	TOR	MDO	POC	TEX	WGL	SNM		
2016					STP	PHX	LBH	ALA	IGP	QL	500	DET		ROA	IOW	TOR	MDO	POC	TEX	WGL	SNM		
2016	Dallara DW-12	Honda	Alexander Rossi **(R)**	98	12	14	20	15	10	11	1	10	12	15	6	16	14	20	11	8	5		
Andretti Herta Autosport with Curb-Agajanian
2017					STP	LBH	ALA	PHX	IMS	INDY		DET		TXS	ROA	IOW	TOR	MDO	POC	GAT	WGL	SNM	
2017					STP	LBH	ALA	PHX	IMS	QL	500	DET		TXS	ROA	IOW	TOR	MDO	POC	GAT	WGL	SNM	
2017	Dallara DW-12	Honda	Alexander Rossi	98	11	19	5	15	8	3	7	5	7	22	13	11	2	6	3	6	**1***	21	
Andretti Herta Autosport with Curb-Agajanian
2018					STP	PHX	LBH	ALA	IMS	INDY	DET		TXS	ROA	IOW	TOR	MDO	POC	GTW	POR	SNM		
2018	Dallara DW12	Honda	Marco Andretti	98	9	12	6	10	13	12	**4**	9	14	11	16	10	11	7	14	25	5		
Andretti Herta Autosport with Marco Andretti & Curb Agajanian
2019					STP	COA	ALA	LBH	IMS	INDY	DET		TEX	ROA	TOR	IOW	MDO	POC	GAT	POR	LAG		
2019	Dallara DW12	Honda	Marco Andretti	98	13	6	14	13	13	26	16	6	10	23	10	21	15	15	10	13	14		
Andretti Herta Autosport with Marco Andretti & Curb Agajanian
2020					TEX	IMS	ROA		IOW		INDY	GTW		MDO		IMS		STP					
2020	Dallara DW12	Honda	Marco Andretti	98	14	22	22	19	22	10	**13**	23	15	23	20	25	22	20					
Andretti Autosport with Curb Agajanian
2021					ALA	STP	TXS	TXS	IMS	INDY	DET		ROA	MDO	**NSH**	IMS	GTW	POR	**LAG**	LBH			
2021	Dallara DW12	Honda	Colton Herta	26					13	16	14	**4**	2	13	**19***	3	18	8	**1***	1*			
2021	Dallara DW12	Honda	Andretti Herta-Haupert Autosport with Marco Andretti & Curb Agajanian																				
2021	Dallara DW12	Honda	Marco Andretti	98						19													
Andretti Autosport with Curb Agajanian
2022					STP	TXS	LBH	ALA	IMS	INDY	DET	ROA	MDO	TOR	IOW	IOW	IMS	NSH	GTW	POR	LAG		
2022	Dallara DW12	Honda	Colton Herta	26	4	12	**23**	10	1	30	8	5	15	**2**	24	12	24	5	11	6	11		
2022	Dallara DW12	Honda	Andretti Herta Autosport with Marco Andretti & Curb Agajanian																				
2022	Dallara DW12	Honda	Marco Andretti	98						22													
Andretti Autosport with Curb Agajanian
2023					STP	TXS	LBH	ALA	IGP1	INDY	DET	ROA	MDO	TOR	IOW		NSH	IGP2	GTW	POR	LAG		
2023	Dallara DW12	Honda	Colton Herta	26	20	7	4	14	9	9	11	**5**	**11**	3	19	7	21	13	6	13	23		
2023	Dallara DW12	Honda	Andretti Herta Autosport with Marco Andretti & Curb Agajanian																				
2023	Dallara DW12	Honda	Marco Andretti	98						17													
Andretti Global with Curb Agajanian
2024					STP	THE	LBH	ALA	IGP	INDY	DET	ROA	LAG	MDO	IOW		TOR	GTW	POR	MIL		NSH	
2024	Dallara DW12	Honda	Colton Herta	26	3	4	2	8	7	23	**19**	6	2	4	**11**	5	**1***	5	4	22	3	1	
2024	Dallara DW12	Honda	Andretti Herta with Marco and Curb Agajanian																				
2024	Dallara DW12	Honda	Marco Andretti	98						25													
Andretti Global with Curb Agajanian
2025					STP	THE	LBH	ALA	IGP	INDY	DET	ROA	LAG	MDO	IOW		TOR	GTW	POR	MIL	NSH		
2025	Dallara DW12	Honda	Colton Herta	26	16	4	7	7	25	14	3	17	16	4	13	20	4	3	10	11	11		
2025	Dallara DW12	Honda	Andretti Herta with Marco and Curb Agajanian																				
2025	Dallara DW12	Honda	Marco Andretti	98						29													

== See also ==
- Curb Racing – Curb's former NASCAR team, partly owned by Agajanian for 12 years.
