= Marco Andretti =

American racing driver (born 1987)

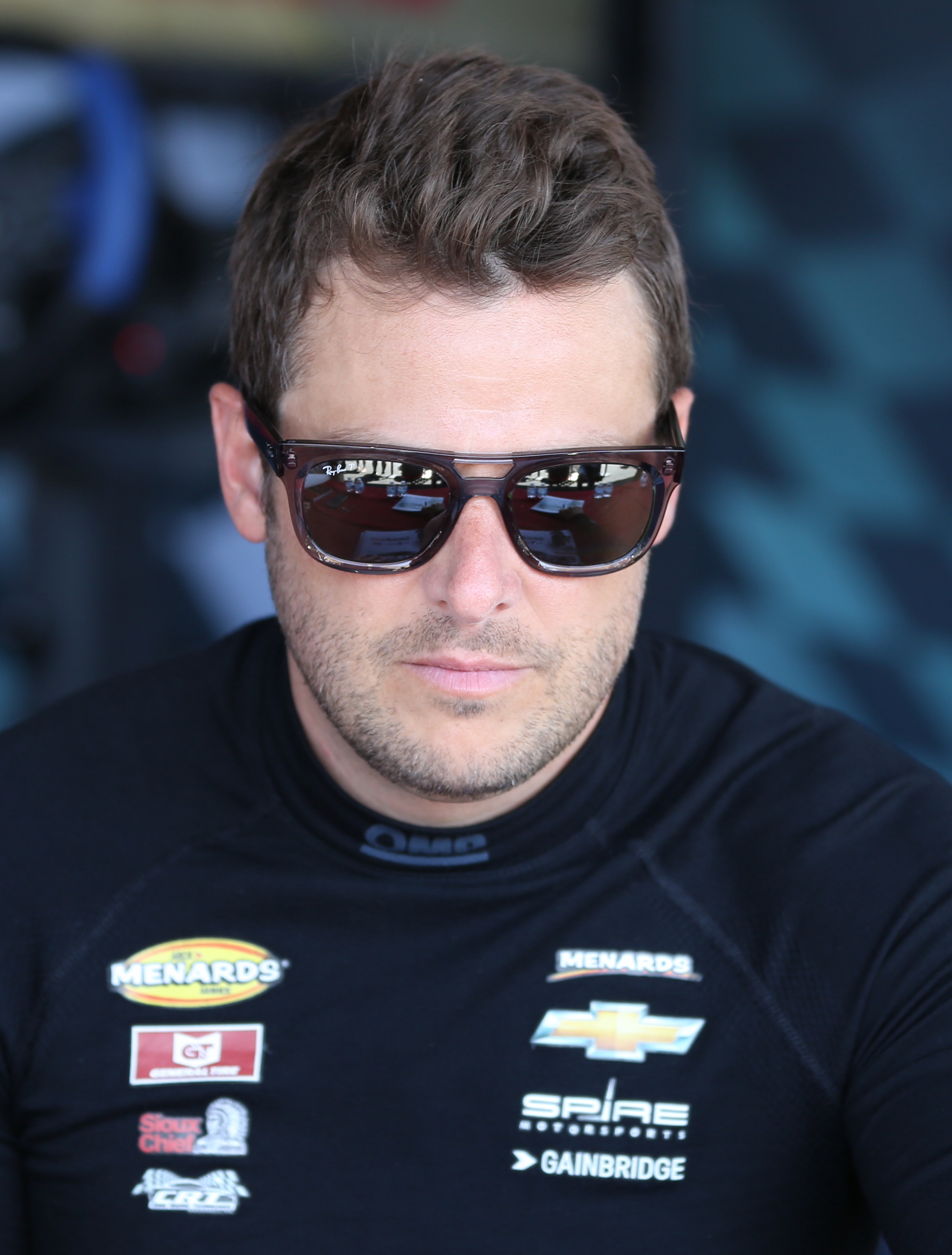
- Andretti at Sonoma Raceway in 2024
- Nationality: (United States) American
- Born: Marco Michael Andretti; March 13, 1987 (age 39); Nazareth, Pennsylvania, U.S.

IndyCar Series career
- 252 races run over 19 years
- Best finish: 5th (2013)
- First race: 2006 Toyota Indy 300 (Homestead)
- Last race: 2025 Indianapolis 500 (Indianapolis)
- First win: 2006 Indy Grand Prix of Sonoma (Sonoma)
- Last win: 2011 Iowa Corn Indy 250 (Iowa)
Wins	Podiums	Poles
2	20	6

NASCAR O'Reilly Auto Parts Series career
- 1 race run over 1 year
- 2022 position: 72nd
- Best finish: 72nd (2022)
- First race: 2022 Drive for the Cure 250 (Charlotte Roval)
Wins	Top tens	Poles
0	0	0

NASCAR FedEx Freight Truck Series career
- 8 races run over 2 years
- 2024 position: 46th
- Best finish: 42nd (2023)
- First race: 2023 O'Reilly Auto Parts 150 at Mid-Ohio (Mid-Ohio)
- Last race: 2024 Baptist Health 200 (Homestead)
Wins	Top tens	Poles
0	0	0

ARCA Menards Series career
- 11 races run over 1 year
- Best finish: 16th (2024)
- First race: 2024 Hard Rock Bet 200 (Daytona)
- Last race: 2024 Reese's 150 (Kansas)
Wins	Top tens	Poles
0	4	0

ARCA Menards Series East career
- 5 races run over 1 year
- Best finish: 13th (2024)
- First race: 2024 General Tire 150 (Dover)
- Last race: 2024 Bush's Beans 200 (Bristol)
Wins	Top tens	Poles
0	2	0

ARCA Menards Series West career
- 4 races run over 1 year
- Best finish: 23rd (2024)
- First race: 2024 General Tire 150 (Phoenix)
- Last race: 2024 Desert Diamond Casino West Valley 100 (Phoenix)
Wins	Top tens	Poles
0	1	0

Previous series
- 2014–15 2012 2008–09 2008 2005 2005: Formula E International V8 Supercars Championship; A1 Grand Prix; American Le Mans Series; Infiniti Pro Series; Star Mazda Championship

Championship titles
- 2022: Camping World SRX Series Champion

Awards
- 2006 2006: Indianapolis 500 Rookie of the Year; IndyCar Series Rookie of the Year
- Statistics up to date as of November 15, 2024.

Marco Michael Andretti (born March 13, 1987) is an American retired auto racing driver who competed in the IndyCar Series from 2006 to 2025. He is the grandson of racing legend Mario Andretti, the son of CART champion Michael Andretti, and the cousin of Trans-Am Series driver Adam Andretti.

After coming up through the ranks of junior open-wheel racing series, Andretti competed in the IndyCar Series for 15 years with his family's team Andretti Herta Autosport. During his time in IndyCar, Andretti won two races and finished a career-high fifth in points in 2013 and was the 2006 IndyCar Series Rookie of the Year. In addition to IndyCar, he also has raced in the NASCAR Xfinity Series, Formula E, IMSA SportsCar Championship, and raced in the 2010 24 Hours of Le Mans. From 2021 to 2023, Andretti raced in the Superstar Racing Experience, in which he was named the 2022 SRX Series champion. In 2024, he competed in selected NASCAR Craftsman Truck and ARCA Menards events

Though his racing career was winding down, Andretti was still primarily focused on competing in the Indianapolis 500. In total, he has competed in 253 IndyCar races. On October 29, 2025, the 20-time Indianapolis 500 starter, 2020 Indy 500 pole winner, and two-time IndyCar Series race winner announced the decision to retire on social media.

== Early life and education ==
Andretti was born in Nazareth, Pennsylvania on March 13, 1987, to Sandra Spinozzi and eventual IndyCar champion Michael Andretti. His paternal grandfather is Mario Andretti, a highly successful racing driver who raced professionally for four decades and won the Formula One Drivers' Championship in 1978. Other members of the extended Andretti family have also had success in various categories of racing.

Andretti attended Notre Dame High School in Easton, Pennsylvania, graduating in 2005.

== Career ==
Andretti won eight races in the 2003 Barber Formula Dodge Eastern Championship, and was champion in the Barber National and Southern class the following year.

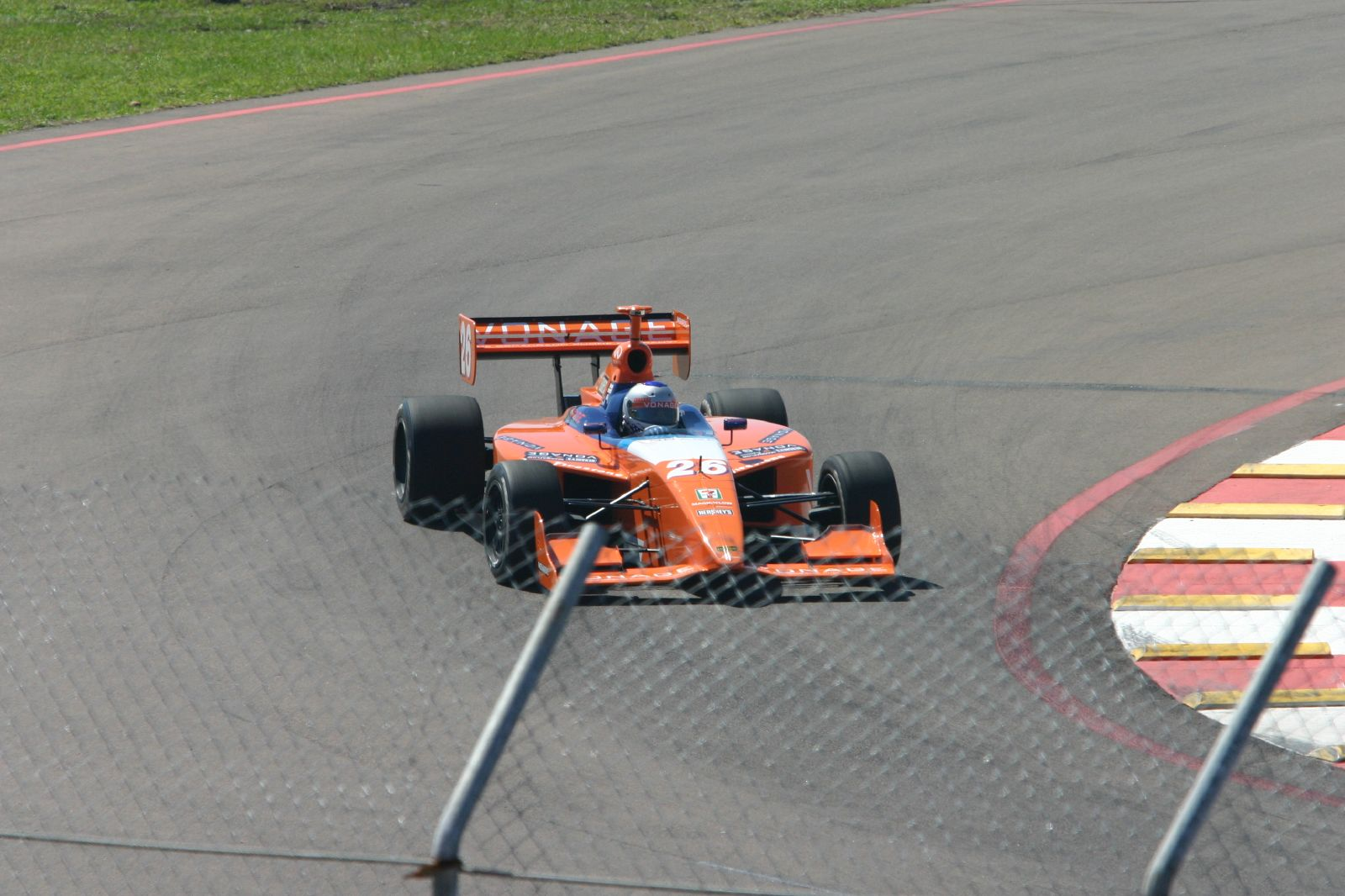
Andretti making his Indy Pro Series debut in 2005 on the Streets of St. Petersburg, where he finished first

In 2005, Andretti raced in the Star Mazda series and made six starts in the Indy Pro Series. He won three times – at St. Petersburg, the Liberty Challenge, and Sonoma – and finished 10th in points despite only starting half the races.

Motorsports journalist Gordon Kirby suggested at the Champ Car finale in Mexico City that the youngest Andretti would be replacing Dan Wheldon in his No. 26 Jim Beam Dallara-Honda for 2006 with Michael Andretti coming out of retirement to run a fifth car for his Andretti Green Racing team at the Indianapolis 500. Though a novel proposition to some, it was later confirmed in a December 15 press conference that he would move up to the Indy Racing League full-time as the youngest driver in series history and would trade sponsors – the New York Stock Exchange and Motorola – with Dario Franchitti, as Andretti was not old enough to run an alcohol-sponsored car.

=== IndyCar Series ===
==== 2006 ====
In his rookie start on March 26, 2006, at Homestead-Miami Speedway in the No. 26 New York Stock Exchange Dallara Honda, Andretti started 13th but broke a half shaft in his first pitstop, eliminating him from the race.

With his Rookie of the Year performance in May at the Indianapolis 500, he became the third Andretti to finish in the top-five in his first Indianapolis 500 appearance, after father Michael (fifth in 1984 Indianapolis 500) and grandfather Mario, who finished third in 1965. Andretti finished second to Sam Hornish Jr. in the second-closest finish in Indianapolis 500 history at a margin of 0.0635 seconds.

On August 27, 2006, Andretti became the youngest winner – at the age of 19 years, 167 days – of a major open-wheel racing event (later to be replaced by Graham Rahal) as he scored his first career Indy Racing League victory at Infineon Raceway in Sonoma, California. He held the record until April 2008, when Graham Rahal won the 2008 Honda Grand Prix of St. Petersburg aged 74 days younger. Andretti's win established him as the 2006 Bombardier Rookie of the Year.

==== 2007 ====
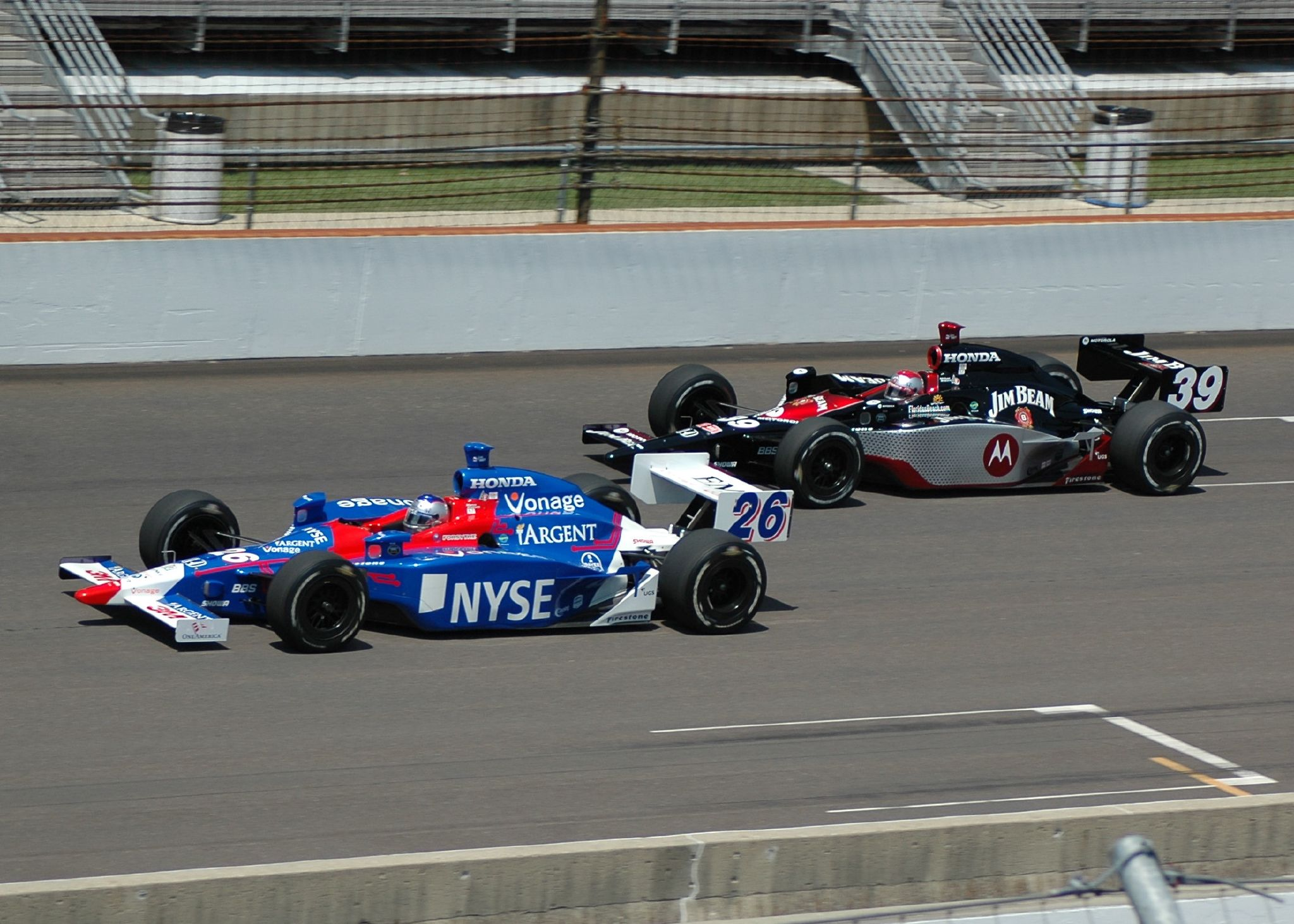
Marco (left) practicing with Michael Andretti at the 2007 Indianapolis 500

The 2007 season was not as successful for Andretti. He failed to finish ten times and only completed seven races. The team struggled to find balance on 1.5-mile (2.4 km) ovals, with accidents eliminating him from the races in Japan, Indianapolis, Milwaukee, and Chicago, as well as the Mid Ohio road course. After finishing second at Michigan, Andretti finished eleventh place overall with 350 points.

==== 2008 ====
Andretti ran his first night race at Homestead-Miami Speedway, the first race of the 2008 season, with a 2nd-place finish behind Scott Dixon. He also led the most laps of the race – leading 85 – and received an additional three points. At St. Petersburg, Andretti snapped a half-shaft on his car trying to leave the pits, causing him to retire. In the third race of the season at Motegi, Japan, Andretti spun out on the first lap of the race. At the 2008 Indianapolis 500, Andretti finished third, after leading several laps. During the race, he passed teammate, Tony Kanaan, who then crashed into the wall, blaming Andretti.

A week later, Andretti captured his first IndyCar Series pole at the Milwaukee Mile and became the youngest IndyCar pole winner at the time – at the age of 21 years, 79 days – but crashed out with three laps to go in the race. His car slipped up the track, collecting Ed Carpenter, which in turn caused Vítor Meira to go airborne as he drove over Andretti's tire. The eventual winner, Ryan Briscoe just missed the wreckage, as Andretti finished 21st. At Texas Motor Speedway, Andretti had one of the best cars and was able to drive the high line all night, but Ryan Hunter-Reay and Andretti made contact with just a few laps to go.

Andretti finished third at Iowa, and then ran a strong race at Richmond but lost position when he pitted under green and a subsequent caution allowed the race leaders to pit under yellow; he finished ninth. Andretti finished fifth at Watkins Glen before mechanical failure caused his car to crash out at Nashville. He also raced earlier the same day in the American Le Mans Series race at Lime Rock Park. At Mid-Ohio, Andretti got caught up in a four-car wreck on a restart on lap 42 which ended his race, before a seventeenth place finish at Edmonton after contact with his teammate Danica Patrick. At Kentucky, Andretti took the lead from Scott Dixon, but as the race neared its end, all drivers had to pit for more fuel and Dixon took the win, while Andretti finished third. Andretti failed to finish higher than eighth in the final three races, as he finished seventh in points.

==== 2009 ====
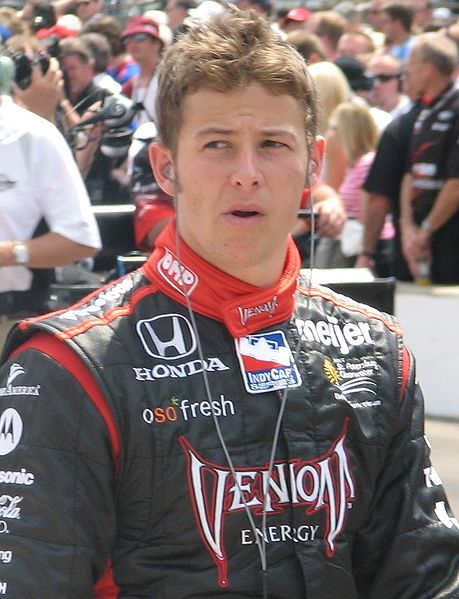
Andretti at Indianapolis Motor Speedway in May 2009

The 2009 season began on two street circuits, allowing Andretti to show the benefits of his A1 Grand Prix experience. At St. Petersburg he tangled late in the race with veteran Alex Tagliani, finishing thirteenth, but overcame a nineteenth place start in Long Beach to finish 6th due to a different pitting sequence. This was Andretti's first time at Long Beach, a circuit at which both his father and grandfather won multiple times. After a sixth place finish at Kansas. Andretti looked to Indianapolis, where he had been second and third in two of his three starts. Starting eighth, Andretti attempted to pass KV Racing Technology's Mario Moraes on the outside of the South chute between turns 1 and 2. Moraes moved towards the wall, apparently unaware that Andretti was outside of him, and both cars collected the wall. Both Andretti and Moraes expressed their displeasure with each other in their on-air interviews. Andretti called the second-year driver "clueless" and said that "he doesn't get it and never will. I should have known who I was racing with."

The remainder of the year did not yield much success, as Andretti's best finish of the year was fourth at Texas. He continued his improved form on the road and street courses, finishing fifth at Watkins Glen, eighth in his first race in Toronto – where his father won a record seven times – and sixth at Mid-Ohio before finishing eighth in the final standings.

==== 2011 and 2012 ====
In 2011, Andretti placed ninth at Indianapolis after starting 27th. On June 25, 2011, Andretti won his second IndyCar Series race at Iowa Speedway. It was his first win in 79 races since his win at Sonoma Raceway in 2006.

In 2012, Andretti started the year with fourteenth place at St. Petersburg, eleventh at Alabama, 25th at Long Beach, and fourteenth at São Paulo. He led the most laps (59) at Indianapolis but hit the turn 1 wall on Lap 188. Andretti continued the season with eleventh at Detroit, seventeenth at Texas, fifteenth at Milwaukee, and a best finish of the season at Iowa, where he finished second. Following his runner-up at Iowa, he had sixteenth at Toronto, fourteenth at Edmonton, eighth at Mid-Ohio, and 25th place at Sonoma. At Baltimore, Andretti made another finish in the back of the field, finishing fourteenth. Just as the season was about to end, he achieved the second pole position of his career at Fontana, finishing the race eighth. Andretti finished sixteenth in the point standings.

=== 2013 ===
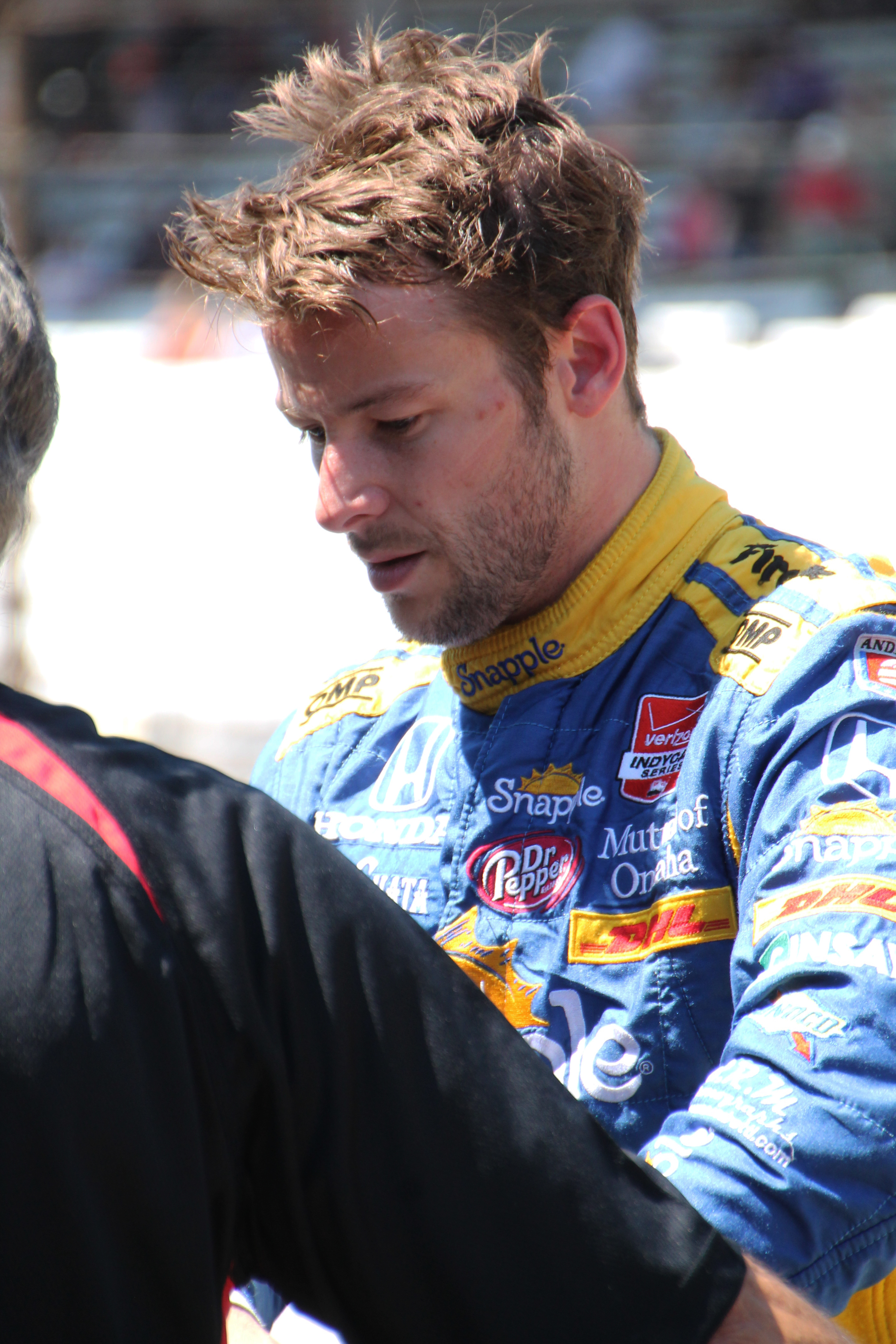
Andretti after practice at Indianapolis Motor Speedway prior to the 2015 Indianapolis 500

Andretti started the 2013 season with a third-place finish at St. Petersburg. This was followed by two seventh place finishes at Barber and Long Beach, matching his top-ten tally from the 2012 season. In the fourth race of the season at São Paulo, Andretti finished third and was able to move to second in the championship thirteen points behind Takuma Sato. He also led his first seven laps of the season. At the Indy 500, Andretti qualified third and was consistently in the top-five throughout the race. He led 31 laps and finished fourth after two late yellow flags that prevented him from moving forward in the field. After the race, Andretti said he was "frustrated" with the finish because he had not been below fourth all race. However, after the 500 he took the points lead by eleven points over Sato.

Andretti continued his season with the first doubleheader at Detroit, finishing twentieth in the first race – his lowest finish of the season – and 6th in the second race, marking improvement between the two. At Texas, he performed relatively well, staying within the top-ten for most of the race, and later finishing fifth. He claimed his third pole position at Milwaukee, but despite his success in qualifying, his engine blew after the first pit stop, leaving him with a twentieth place finish, before he finished ninth at Iowa. At Pocono, where his grandfather and father had once raced, he was at the top of his game, setting the track record for the fastest lap, and gaining a fourth career pole. Despite leading early in the race, he faded to a tenth place finish in the end. At the Toronto doubleheader, he qualified and finished in the top-ten, staying consistently well during the race. He finished fourth in race one, and finished ninth in the other race at Toronto, without any other events altering his finish. At Mid-Ohio, he finished ninth, without having many eventful occurrences throughout the race. He finished the season fifth in points.

==== 2018 ====
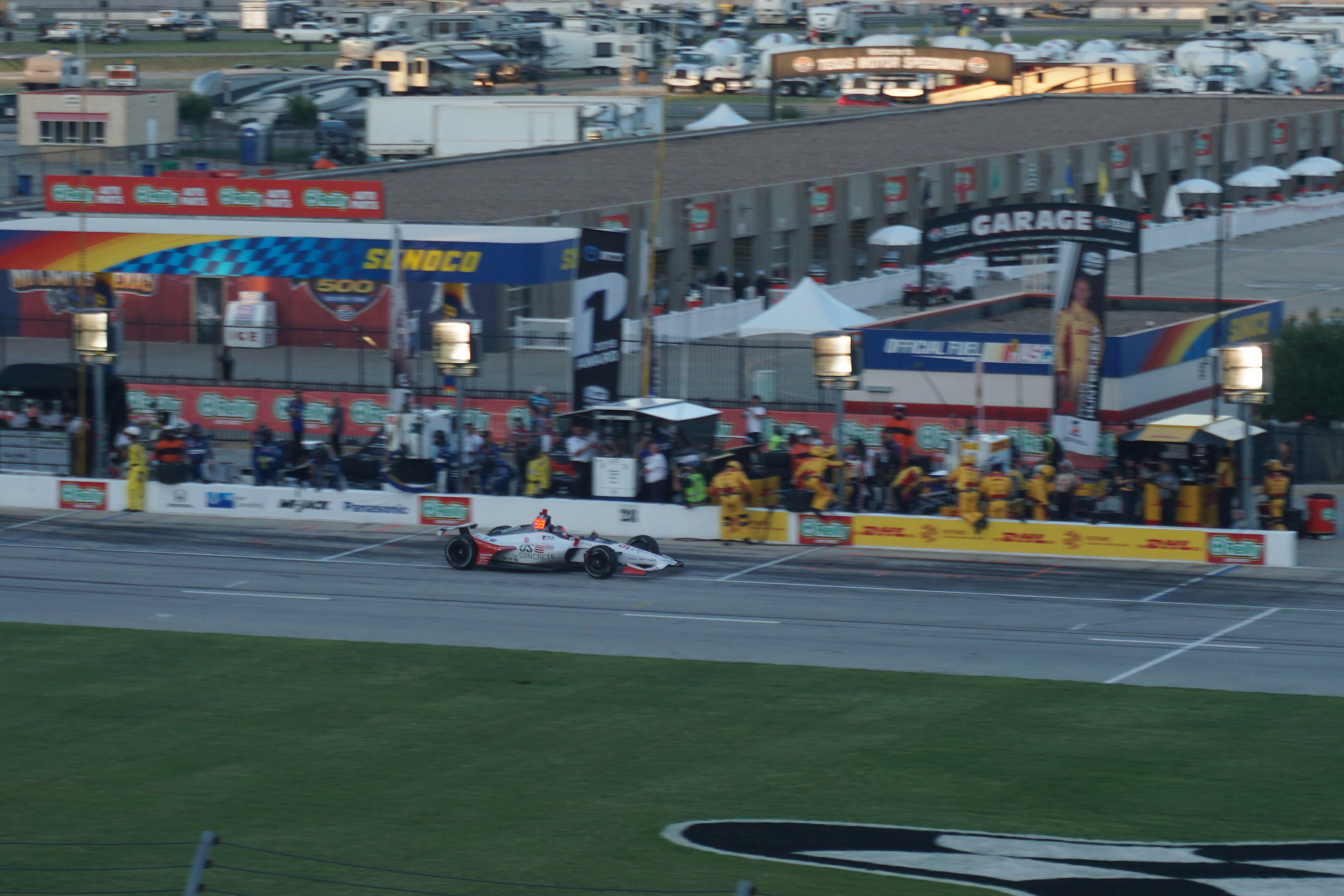
Andretti at Texas Motor Speedway in 2019

On December 7, 2017, Andretti Autosport announced plans for Andretti to swap car numbers with teammate Alexander Rossi for the 2018 season. Rossi would move to the No. 27 team while Andretti took over Rossi's No. 98.

==== 2020 ====
Following disappointing 2018 and 2019 seasons in which he failed to secure any podium finishes, Andretti qualified for the pole position at the 2020 Indianapolis 500, posting an average speed of 231.068 MPH—the first time an Andretti had sat on the pole for the Indy 500 since his grandfather Mario in 1987. The high point in his season proved short-lived, however, as he quickly faded after the race's start and ended up finishing thirteenth. Andretti would finish no higher than tenth during the pandemic-shortened 2020 season.

=== IndyCar ===
In January 2021, Andretti announced that he would "step away" from full-time IndyCar racing, though he will continue to work with the Andretti Autosport team in a testing and development role. He placed 19th in the 2021 Indianapolis 500. He finished 22nd in the 2022 Indianapolis 500, 17th in the 2023 Indianapolis 500, 25th in the 2024 Indianapolis 500 and 29th in the 2025 Indianapolis 500. On October 29, 2025, Andretti would announce his retirement from motor racing and the Indianapolis 500.

== Sponsorship ==
In February 2018, U.S. Concrete announced that they would be sponsoring Andretti in six of the upcoming races including the Indianapolis 500 and the GP of Long Beach. other sponsors include Verizon and PennGrade Motor Oil. Andretti was partnered with KULR Technology Group as a driver and ambassador, and KULR served as a sponsor for his No. 98 entry in the Indianapolis 500 for 2022 and 2023. 2024 and 2025 saw Andretti with primary sponsorship from Mapei, one of the world’s leading manufacturers of chemical products for the building industry.

== Formula One ==
=== Honda Racing F1 tests ===
Honda Racing F1 announced in December 2006 that Andretti would be presented with an opportunity to test their Formula One car, and on December 15, Andretti drove their Formula One car at Jerez in Spain. Honda sporting director Gil de Ferran commented that he had done a good job. Andretti said that he had greatly enjoyed the test but also told reporters that he wishes to enter Formula One only after he has won the Indianapolis 500.

On February 7–8, 2007, Andretti participated in a second Honda Racing F1 test for two days in Jerez, Spain. As in the previous test, Andretti drove the team's 2006 Formula One car. His (unofficial) fastest lap of the day on February 7 was less than 1.5 seconds slower than Honda team driver Jenson Button's fastest time. His (unofficial) fastest time on February 8, in changeable conditions, was less than one second slower than that of the 2005 and 2006 Formula One World Drivers' Champion Fernando Alonso's fastest lap, although several seconds slower than Honda driver Rubens Barrichello.

== American Le Mans Series ==
=== 12 Hours of Sebring ===
Andretti drove in the ALMS Sebring 12-hour endurance race for the Andretti Green Racing XM Satellite Radio car in March 2008. He was able to put in times in the 1-minute 48-second range that neither of his co-drivers was able to match. Although the car was retired early from the race, it was in the position for a podium finish.

On July 12, 2008, Andretti raced in the American LeMans race at Lime Rock Park, Conn in the AGR XM Acura. Later that same day, he raced in the IndyCar Series race in Nashville.

Andretti, Franck Montagny, and Tony Kanaan raced at the Petit Le Mans on October 4, 2008. A late-race incident retired the No. 26 XM Radio Acura early, with a seventh-place finish in LMP2 and sixteenth overall.

== GRAND-AM Rolex Sports Car Series ==
Andretti made his Rolex Sports Car Series debut in the 2012 24 Hours of Daytona, driving the No. 2 Starworks Motorsport Riley-Ford with Ryan Hunter-Reay, Michael Valiante, Scott Mayer and Miguel Potolicchio, finishing 10th overall.

== SRX Racing ==
After stepping away from full-time IndyCar racing, Andretti joined Tony Stewart and Ray Evernham's new Superstar Racing Experience where he would run the full six-race season in the No. 98 stock car. Andretti would perform exceptionally well in the series, with him winning the race in Slinger Speedway late in the season. It was his first victory in any form of motorsports since his final IndyCar win in 2011.

Andretti won the 2022 SRX Series championship, besting Ryan Newman by two points. The championship victory came despite not winning a race during the course of the year.

== A1 Grand Prix ==
=== 2008–09 season ===
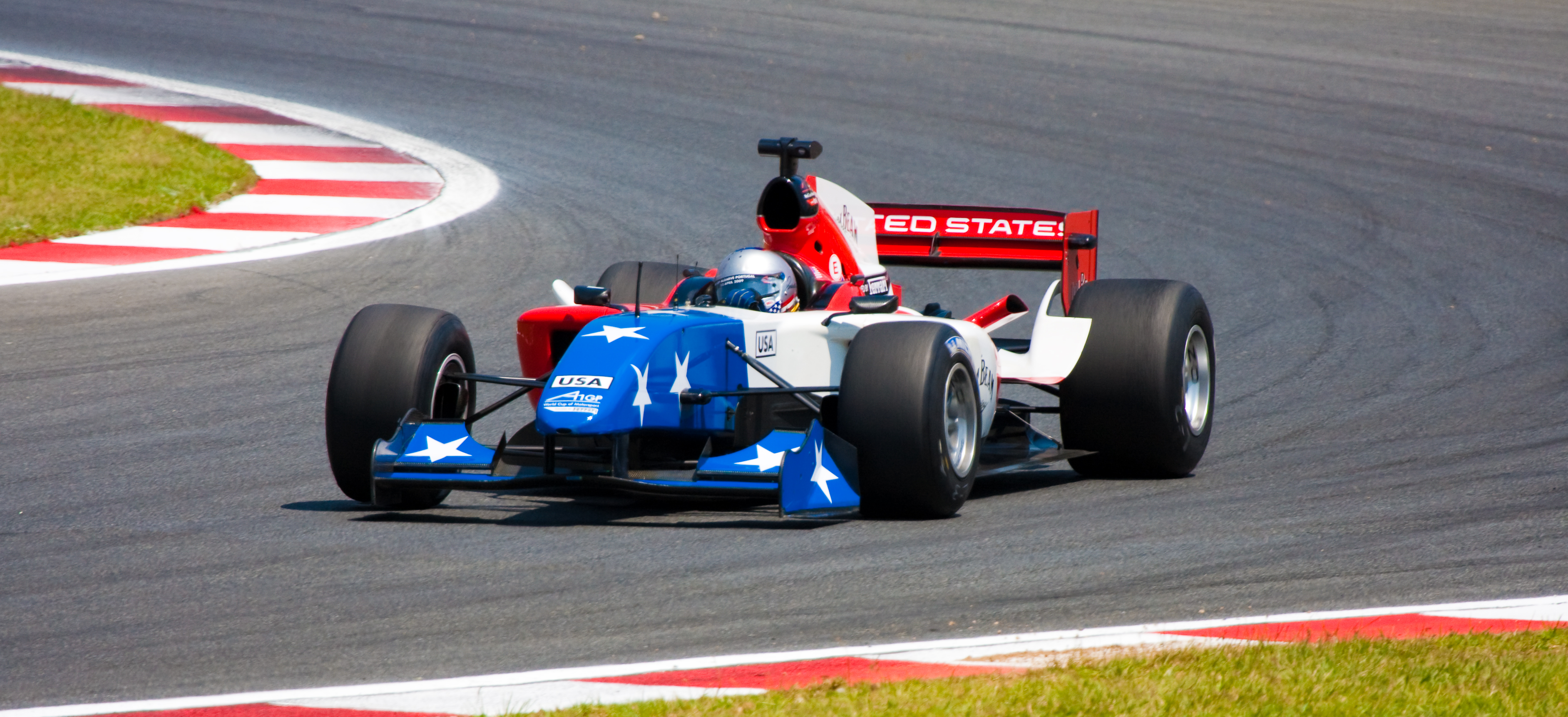
Andretti competing for A1 Team USA at the 2008–09 A1 Grand Prix of Nations, South Africa

On November 3, 2008, Andretti was confirmed to be racing for A1 Team USA at the second round of the 2008–09 A1 Grand Prix season. Andretti was given the opportunity to race after Andretti Green Racing was revealed to be taking over the management of A1 Team USA starting with the 2008–09 season, and his father Michael Andretti became seat holder.

== Formula E ==
Andretti competed for Andretti Autosport in the fourth round of the 2014–15 Formula E season in Buenos Aires, replacing Matthew Brabham. For the fifth round in Miami, Andretti was replaced by Scott Speed.

== NASCAR ==
=== Xfinity Series ===
Andretti made his NASCAR Xfinity Series debut in 2022 at the Charlotte Roval in the No. 48 Chevrolet Camaro for Big Machine Racing. He would finish 36th after being involved in an accident with 22 laps remaining.

=== Craftsman Truck Series ===
In 2023, Andretti made his NASCAR Craftsman Truck Series debut at the Mid-Ohio Sports Car Course, driving the No. 7 Chevrolet Silverado for Spire Motorsports, where he would finish in nineteenth position after starting in seventh. He would then run the final two races of the Truck season for Spire, finishing eighteenth at Homestead-Miami Speedway, and 35th at Phoenix Raceway due to a crash with Chris Hacker.

At the Circuit of the Americas in 2024, Andretti finished 31st after the rear end assembly completely detached from his truck.

=== ARCA Menards Series ===
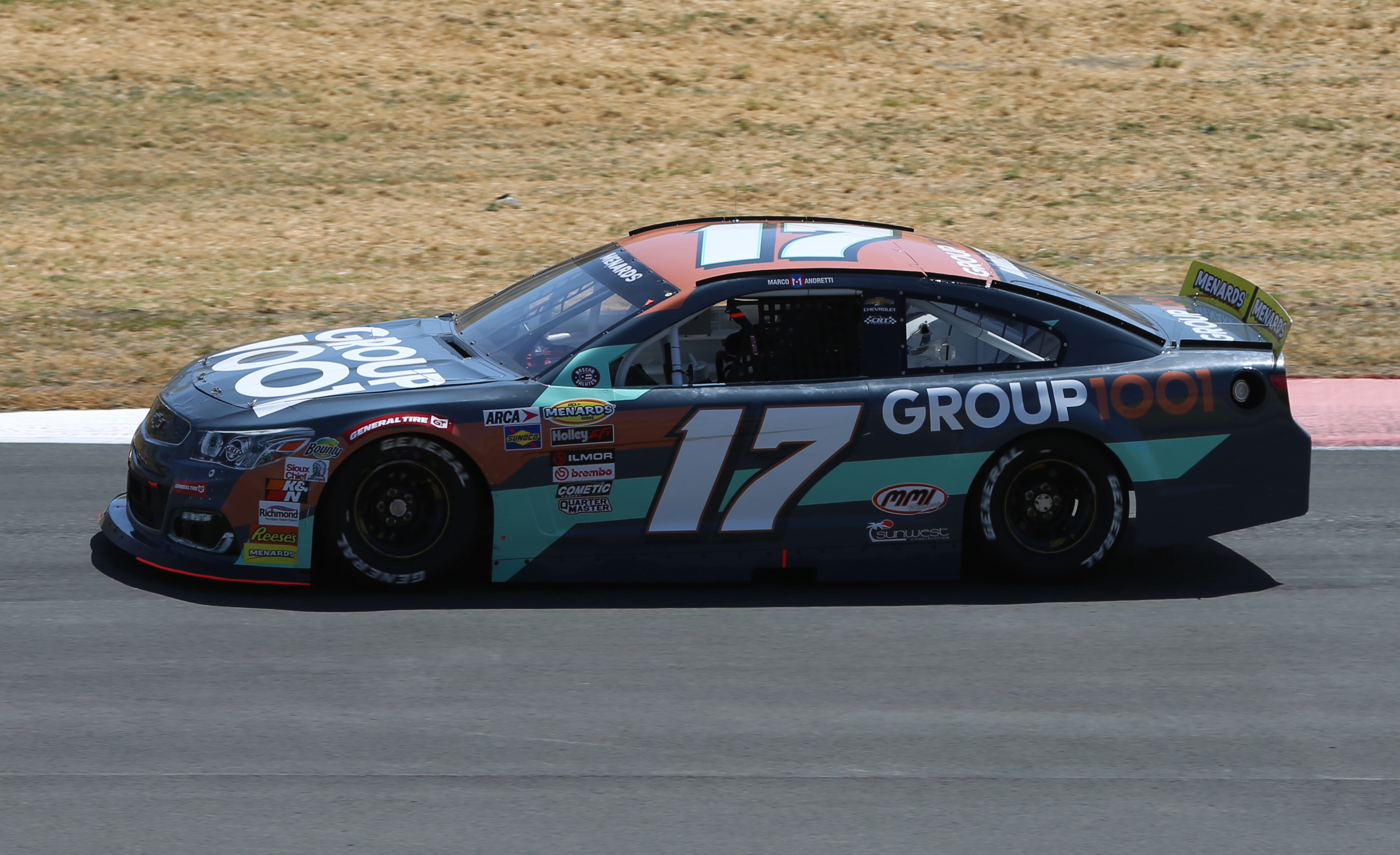
Andretti's No. 17 car at Sonoma Raceway in 2024

In 2024, it was revealed that Andretti would participate in the pre-season test at Daytona International Speedway for the ARCA Menards Series, driving for McGowan Motorsports with Cook Racing Technologies. Shortly thereafter, it was revealed that Andretti would run up to fourteen races driving the No. 17 Chevrolet for CRT across the main ARCA Menards Series, ARCA Menards Series East, and ARCA Menards Series West.

== Personal life ==
Off the track, Andretti spends his time in Nazareth, Pennsylvania, having purchased his childhood home from his father, Michael, for $2 million.

In September 2017, after the conclusion of the 2017 IndyCar Series, Andretti married his long-time girlfriend, model Marta Krupa, sister of model and former Real Housewives of Miami star Joanna Krupa. On December 11, 2021, Andretti announced on Instagram that he and Krupa were "parting ways in a very friendly way." Andretti became a father to a baby girl Miura on the 17th of September 2024.

In May 2025, Andretti presented a plan to convert his grandparents' house in Bethlehem, Pennsylvania into a multi-unit development. Despite neighbors' protestations, the plan was approved by the city's planning commission.

== Racing record ==
=== American open–wheel racing results ===
(key) (Races in bold indicate pole position)

==== Skip Barber National Championship ====
Year	1	2	3	4	5	6	7	8	9	10	11	12	13	14	Rank	Points
2004	SEB; 7	SEB; 3	VIR; 3	VIR; 2	ROA; 2	ROA; 1	HAL; 3	HAL; 2	MOS; 5	MOS; 7	MTT; 5	MTT; 2	ROA; 2	ROA; 8	1st	191

==== Star Mazda ====
Year	Team	1	2	3	4	5	6	7	8	9	10	11	12	Rank	Points
2004	G&W Motorsports	SEB	MOH	LRP; 26	SNM	POR	MOS	ROA	ATL	PHX	LAG			NC	0
2005	MJ Motorsports	SEB; 19	ATL; 6	MOH; 4	MTL; 5	PPIR; 8	SNM; 2	SNM; 6	POR; 19	ROA; 24	MOS; 6	ATL; 9	LAG; DSQ	5th	288

==== Indy Lights ====
Year	Team	1	2	3	4	5	6	7	8	9	10	11	12	13	14	Rank	Points
2005	Andretti Green Racing	HMS	PHX	**STP**; 1	INDY; 16	TXS	**IMS**; 1	NSH	MIL	KTY; 3	PPIR	**SNM**; 1	CHI	WGL; 2	FON	10th	250

==== IndyCar Series ====
(key)

Year	Team	No.	Chassis	Engine	1	2	3	4	5	6	7	8	9	10	11	12	13	14	15	16	17	18	19	Rank	Pts	Ref
2006	Andretti Green Racing	26	Dallara IR-05	Honda	HMS; 15	STP; 15	MOT; 12	INDY; 2	WGL; 16	TXS; 14	RIR; 4	KAN; 9	NSH; 8	MIL; 5	MIS; 8	KTY; 17	SNM; 1	CHI; 18						7th	325	
2007	Andretti Green Racing	26	Dallara IR-05	Honda	HMS; 20	STP; 4	MOT; 16	KAN; 19	INDY; 24	MIL; 15	TXS; 19	IOW; 2	RIR; 12	WGL; 5	NSH; 5	MOH; 18	MIS; 2	KTY; 4	SNM; 16	DET; 17	CHI; 22			11th	350	
2008	Andretti Green Racing	26	Dallara IR-05	Honda	HMS; 2	STP; 25	MOT^{1} 18	LBH^{1}	KAN; 5	INDY; 3	**MIL**; 21	TXS; 19	IOW; 3	RIR; 9	WGL; 5	NSH; 24	MOH; 25	EDM; 17	KTY; 3	SNM; 14	DET; 18	CHI; 8		7th	363	
2009	Andretti Green Racing	26	Dallara IR-05	Honda	STP; 13	LBH; 6	KAN; 6	INDY; 30	MIL; 7	TXS; 4	IOW; 12	RIR; 7	WGL; 5	TOR; 8	EDM; 10	KTY; 10	MOH; 6	SNM; 14	CHI; 11	MOT; 7	HMS; 22			8th	380	
2010	Andretti Autosport	26	Dallara IR-05	Honda	SAO; 23	STP; 12	ALA; 5	LBH; 14	KAN; 13	INDY; 3	TXS; 3	IOW; 15	WGL; 13	TOR; 8	EDM; 11	MOH; 9	SNM; 12	CHI; 3	KTY; 6	MOT; 11	HMS; 7			8th	392	
2011	Andretti Autosport	26	Dallara IR-05	Honda	STP; 24	ALA; 4	LBH; 26	SAO; 14	INDY; 9	TXS; 13	TXS; 6	MIL; 13	IOW; 1	TOR; 4	EDM; 14	MOH; 7	NHM; 24	SNM; 24	BAL; 25	MOT; 3	KTY; 27	LVS^{2} C		8th	337	
2012	Andretti Autosport	26	Dallara DW12	Chevrolet	STP; 14	ALA; 11	LBH; 25	SAO; 14	INDY; 24	DET; 11	TXS; 17	MIL; 15	IOW; 2	TOR; 16	EDM; 14	MOH; 8	SNM; 25	BAL; 14	**FON**; 8					16th	278	
2013	Andretti Autosport	25	Dallara DW12	Chevrolet	STP; 3	ALA; 7	LBH; 7	SAO; 3	INDY; 4	DET; 20	DET; 6	TXS; 5	**MIL**; 20	IOW; 9	**POC**; 10	TOR; 4	TOR; 9	MOH; 9	SNM; 4	BAL; 10	HOU; 13	HOU; 20	FON; 7	5th	484	
2014	Andretti Autosport	25	Dallara DW12	Honda	STP; 22	LBH; 8	ALA; 2	IMS; 14	INDY; 3	DET; 10	DET; 16	TXS; 22	HOU; 8	HOU; 9	POC; 9	IOW; 18	TOR; 16	TOR; 8	MOH; 22	MIL; 13	SNM; 8	FON; 11		9th	463	
2015	Andretti Autosport	27	Dallara DW12	Honda	STP; 10	NLA; 13	LBH; 8	ALA; 10	IMS; 16	INDY; 6	DET; 2	DET; 5	TXS; 5	TOR; 13	FON; 3	MIL; 8	IOW; 7	MOH; 10	POC; 18	SNM; 11				9th	429	
2016	Andretti Autosport	27	Dallara DW12	Honda	STP; 15	PHX; 13	LBH; 19	ALA; 12	IMS; 15	INDY; 13	DET; 16	DET; 9	RDA; 12	IOW; 14	TOR; 10	MOH; 13	POC; 12	TXS; 12	WGL; 12	SNM; 8				16th	339	
2017	Andretti Autosport	27	Dallara DW12	Honda	STP; 7	LBH; 20	ALA; 21	PHX; 18	IMS; 16	INDY; 8	DET; 12	DET; 13	TXS; 6	ROA; 18	IOW; 17	TOR; 4	MOH; 12	POC; 11	GTW; 14	WGL; 16	SNM; 7			12th	388	
2018	Andretti Herta Autosport with Curb Agajanian	98	Dallara DW12	Honda	STP; 9	PHX; 12	LBH; 6	ALA; 10	IMS; 13	INDY; 12	**DET**; 4	DET; 9	TXS; 14	ROA; 11	IOW; 16	TOR; 10	MOH; 11	POC; 7	GTW; 14	POR; 25	SNM; 5			9th	392	
2019	Andretti Herta Autosport with Marco Andretti & Curb Agajanian	98	Dallara DW12	Honda	STP; 13	COA; 6	ALA; 14	LBH; 13	IMS; 13	INDY; 26	DET; 16	DET; 6	TXS; 10	RDA; 23	TOR; 10	IOW; 21	MOH; 15	POC; 15	GTW; 10	POR; 13	LAG; 14			16th	303	
2020	Andretti Herta Autosport with Marco Andretti & Curb Agajanian	98	Dallara DW12	Honda	TXS; 14	IMS; 22	ROA; 22	ROA; 19	IOW; 22	IOW; 10	**INDY**; 13	GTW; 23	GTW; 15	MOH; 23	MOH; 20	IMS; 25	IMS; 22	STP; 20						20th	176	
2021	Andretti Herta-Haupert Autosport with Marco Andretti & Curb Agajanian	98	Dallara DW12	Honda	ALA	STP	TXS	TXS	IMS	INDY; 19	DET	DET	ROA	MOH	NSH	IMS	GTW	POR	LAG	LBH				35th	22	
2022	Andretti Herta Autosport with Marco Andretti & Curb Agajanian	98	Dallara DW12	Honda	STP	TXS	LBH	ALA	IMS	INDY; 22	DET	ROA	MOH	TOR	IOW	IOW	IMS	NSH	GTW	POR	LAG			33rd	17	
2023	Andretti Herta Autosport with Marco Andretti & Curb Agajanian	98	Dallara DW12	Honda	STP	TXS	LBH	ALA	IMS	INDY; 17	DET	ROA	MOH	TOR	IOW	IOW	NSH	IMS	GTW	POR	LAG			35th	13	
2024	Andretti Herta Autosport with Marco Andretti & Curb Agajanian	98	Dallara DW12	Honda	STP	THE	LBH	ALA	IMS	INDY; 25	DET	ROA	LAG	MOH	IOW	IOW	TOR	GTW	POR	MIL	MIL	NSH		43rd	5	
2025	Andretti Herta Autosport with Marco Andretti & Curb Agajanian	98	Dallara DW12	Honda	STP	THE	LBH	ALA	IMS	INDY; 29	DET	GTW	ROA	MOH	IOW	IOW	TOR	LAG	POR	MIL	NSH			34th	5	

* Season still in progress.

- ^{1} Run on same day.
- ^{2} The Las Vegas Indy 300 was abandoned after Dan Wheldon died from injuries sustained in a 15-car crash on lap 11.

Years	Teams	Races	Poles	Wins	Top 5s	Top 10s	Laps led	RAF	Indianapolis 500 wins	Championships
15	1	248	6	2	42	107	1032	200	0	0

==== Indianapolis 500 ====
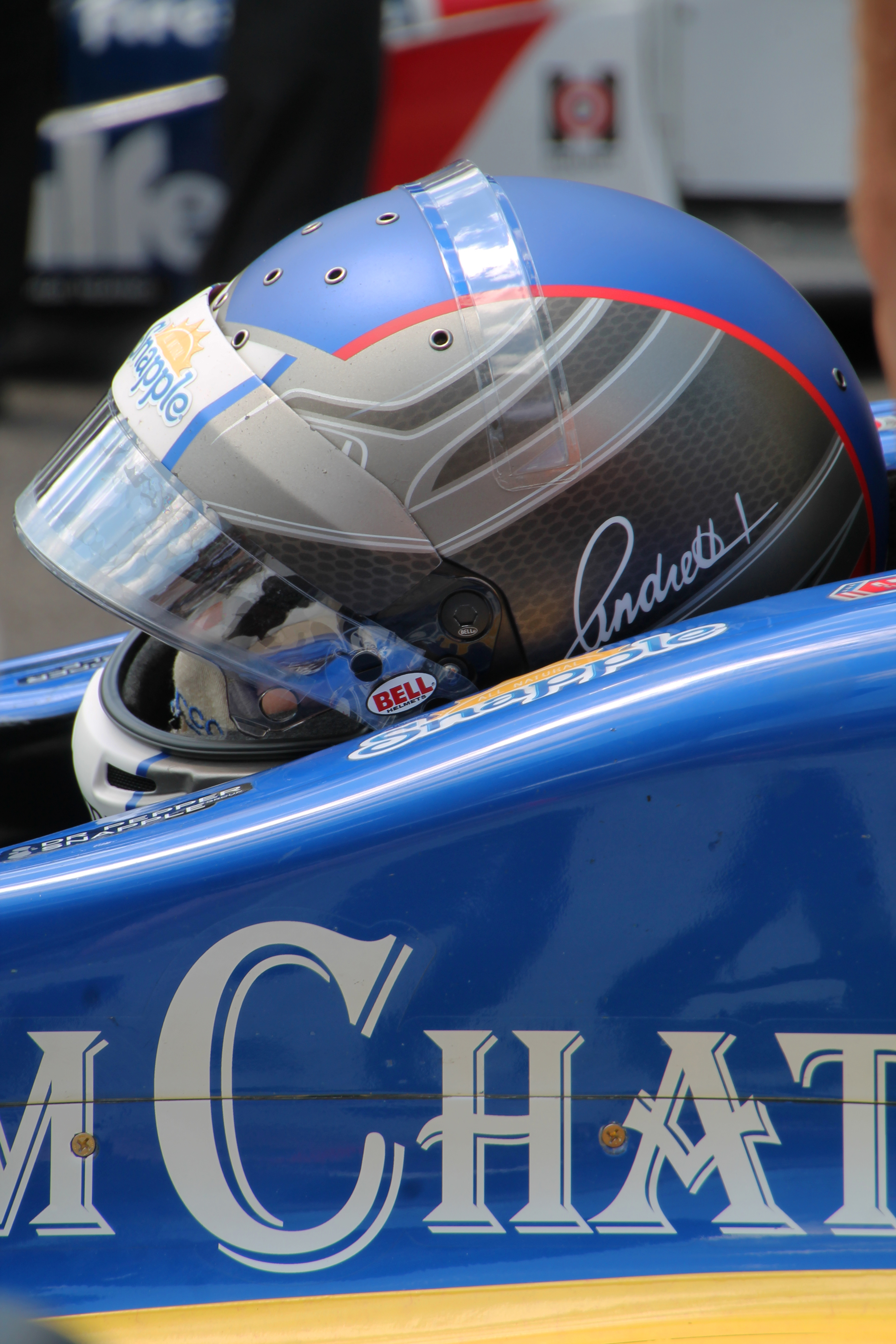
Andretti participating in the Pit Stop Challenge on Carb Day at the Indianapolis Motor Speedway, 2015

Year	Chassis	Engine	Start	Finish	Team
2006	Dallara	Honda	9	2	Andretti Green
2007	Dallara	Honda	9	24	Andretti Green
2008	Dallara	Honda	7	3	Andretti Green
2009	Dallara	Honda	8	30	Andretti Green
2010	Dallara	Honda	16	3	Andretti Autosport
2011	Dallara	Honda	27	9	Andretti Autosport
2012	Dallara	Chevrolet	4	24	Andretti Autosport
2013	Dallara	Chevrolet	3	4	Andretti Autosport
2014	Dallara	Honda	6	3	Andretti Autosport
2015	Dallara	Honda	8	6	Andretti Autosport
2016	Dallara	Honda	14	13	Andretti Autosport
2017	Dallara	Honda	8	8	Andretti Autosport with Yarrow
2018	Dallara	Honda	12	12	Andretti Herta Autosport with Curb-Agajanian
2019	Dallara	Honda	10	26	Andretti Herta Autosport with Curb-Agajanian
2020	Dallara	Honda	**1**	13	Andretti Herta Autosport with Curb-Agajanian
2021	Dallara	Honda	25	19	Andretti Herta-Haupert Autosport with Curb-Agajanian
2022	Dallara	Honda	23	22	Andretti Herta Autosport with Curb-Agajanian
2023	Dallara	Honda	24	17	Andretti Herta Autosport with Curb-Agajanian
2024	Dallara	Honda	19	25	Andretti Herta Autosport with Curb-Agajanian
2025	Dallara	Honda	29	29	Andretti Global

=== Complete American Le Mans Series results ===
Year	Entrant	Class	Chassis	Engine	Tyres	1	2	3	4	5	6	7	8	9	10	11	Rank	Points
2008	Andretti Green Racing	LMP2	Acura ARX-01b	Acura 3.4L V8	**M**	SEB ovr:18 cls:6	STP	LNB	UTA	LIM ovr:6 cls:5	MID	AME	MOS	DET	PET ovr:16 cls:7	MON	24th	38

=== Complete A1 Grand Prix results ===
(key)

Year	Entrant	1	2	3	4	5	6	7	8	9	10	11	12	13	14	DC	Points
2008–09	A1 Team USA	NED; SPR	NED; FEA	CHN; SPR; 15	CHN; FEA; 8	MYS; SPR; Ret	MYS; FEA; 3	NZL; SPR; 11	NZL; FEA; 11	RSA; SPR; 17	RSA; FEA; 8	POR; SPR; 12	POR; FEA; Ret	GBR; SPR	GBR; SPR	11th	24

=== 24 Hours of Le Mans results ===
Year	Team	Co-drivers	Car	Class	Laps	Pos.	Class pos.
2010	(Switzerland) Rebellion Racing	(France) Nicolas Prost (Switzerland) Neel Jani	Lola B10/60-Rebellion	LMP1	175	DNF	DNF

=== Complete Formula E results ===
(key) (Races in bold indicate pole position; races in italics indicate fastest lap)

Year	Team	Chassis	Powertrain	1	2	3	4	5	6	7	8	9	10	11	Pos	Points
2014–15	Andretti Autosport	Spark SRT01-e	SRT01-e	BEI	PUT	PDE	BUE; 12	MIA	LBH	MCO	BER	MSC	LDN	LDN	30th	0

=== Superstar Racing Experience ===
(key) * – Most laps led. ^{1} – Heat 1 winner. ^{2} – Heat 2 winner.

Superstar Racing Experience results
Year	No.	1	2	3	4	5	6	SRXC	Pts
2021	98	STA; 10	KNX; 7	ELD; 4^{2}	IRP; 4	SLG; 1^{1}	NSV; 11	4th	171
2022	98	FIF; 7	SBO; 8	STA; 2*	NSV; 2	I55; 2	SHA; 9	**1st**	195
2023	1	STA; 6	STA II; 3	MMS; 9	BER; 4	ELD; 6	LOS; 6	2nd	167

^{*} Season still in progress

=== Complete IMSA SportsCar Championship results ===
(key) (Races in bold indicate pole position; races in italics indicate fastest lap)

Year	Entrant	Class	Make	Engine	1	2	3	4	5	6	7	Rank	Points
2021	Andretti Autosport	LMP3	Ligier JS P320	Nissan VK56DE 5.6 L V8	DAY	SEB	MOH	WGL; 4	WGL	ELK	PET	21st	312

=== NASCAR ===
(key) (Bold – Pole position awarded by qualifying time. Italics – Pole position earned by points standings or practice time. * – Most laps led. ** – All laps led.)

==== Xfinity Series ====
NASCAR Xfinity Series results
Year	Team	No.	Make	1	2	3	4	5	6	7	8	9	10	11	12	13	14	15	16	17	18	19	20	21	22	23	24	25	26	27	28	29	30	31	32	33	NXSC	Pts	Ref
2022	Big Machine Racing	48	Chevy	DAY	CAL	LVS	PHO	ATL	COA	RCH	MAR	TAL	DOV	DAR	TEX	CLT	PIR	NSH	ROA	ATL	NHA	POC	IRC	MCH	GLN	DAY	DAR	KAN	BRI	TEX	TAL	ROV; 36	LVS	HOM	MAR	PHO	72nd	1	

==== Craftsman Truck Series ====
NASCAR Craftsman Truck Series results
Year	Team	No.	Make	1	2	3	4	5	6	7	8	9	10	11	12	13	14	15	16	17	18	19	20	21	22	23	NCTC	Pts	Ref
2023	Spire Motorsports	7	Chevy	DAY	LVS	ATL	COA	TEX	BRD	MAR	KAN	DAR	NWS	CLT	GTW	NSH	MOH; 19	POC	RCH	IRP	MLW	KAN	BRI	TAL	HOM; 18	PHO; 35	42nd	39	
2024	Roper Racing	04	Chevy	DAY	ATL	LVS	BRI	COA; 31	MAR	TEX	KAN	DAR	NWS	CLT	GTW	NSH	POC	IRP; 25	RCH	MLW; 31	BRI; DNQ	KAN; 34	TAL	HOM; 30	MAR	PHO	46th	34	

^{*} Season still in progress
^{1} Ineligible for series points

=== ARCA Menards Series ===
(key) (Bold – Pole position awarded by qualifying time. Italics – Pole position earned by points standings or practice time. * – Most laps led.)

ARCA Menards Series results
Year	Team	No.	Make	1	2	3	4	5	6	7	8	9	10	11	12	13	14	15	16	17	18	19	20	AMSC	Pts	Ref
2024	Cook Racing Technologies	17	Chevy	DAY; 25	PHO; 21	TAL	DOV; 19	KAN; 9	CLT	IOW; 22	MOH; 5	BLN	IRP; 7	SLM	ELK	MCH	ISF	MLW; 10	DSF	GLN; 14	BRI; 22	KAN; 23	TOL	16th	307	

==== ARCA Menards Series East ====
ARCA Menards Series East results
Year	Team	No.	Make	1	2	3	4	5	6	7	8	AMSEC	Pts	Ref
2024	Cook Racing Technologies	17	Chevy	FIF	DOV; 19	NSV	FRS	IOW; 22	IRP; 7	MLW; 10	BRI; 22	13th	190	

==== ARCA Menards Series West ====
ARCA Menards Series West results
Year	Team	No.	Make	1	2	3	4	5	6	7	8	9	10	11	12	AMSWC	Pts	Ref
2024	Cook Racing Technologies	17	Chevy	PHO; 21	KER	PIR; 7	SON; 11	IRW	IRW	SHA	TRI	MAD	AAS	KER		23rd	120	
2024	Venturini Motorsports	25	Toyota												PHO; 17	23rd	120	

Awards and achievements
Preceded by Danica Patrick	Indianapolis 500; Rookie of the Year; 2006	Succeeded by Phil Giebler
Preceded by Danica Patrick	IndyCar Series; Rookie of the Year; 2006	Succeeded by Ryan Hunter-Reay
