= IndyCar Series at Iowa Speedway =

American motorsport race series

IndyCar Series
- Venue: Iowa Speedway
- First race: 2007
- Last race: 2025
- Distance: 240.625 miles (387.248 km)
- Laps: 275

Events in the NTT IndyCar Series were held annually at the Iowa Speedway in Newton, Iowa from 2007 until 2025.

== History ==
=== Racing in Iowa ===
The first Championship Car race in Iowa took place on July 9, 1915. AAA held a 100-mile (160 km) race at Tri-State Fair Grounds in Burlington, Iowa, won by Bob Burman. Additional AAA races were held at Des Moines Speedway in Valley Junction, a one-mile (1.6 km) wooden board track, in 1915 and 1916. Only two championship car races, won by Ralph Mulford and Ralph DePalma respectively, were held at Des Moines, as the track closed and was dismantled shortly thereafter.

On August 6, 2006, IndyCar & Iowa Speedway officials announced the first IndyCar race at Iowa Speedway would be held June 24, 2007. The race itself was a crashfest with the 10th-place finisher of Scott Dixon finishing 77 laps down to the winning driver of Dario Franchitti.

In October 2013, Iowa Speedway announced that the 2014 race was extended to 300 laps.

In most years since its inception, the race has been held as a Sunday afternoon event. In 2011, 2012, 2014, 2015 and 2019, it was held as a Saturday night race under the lights.

In 2020 IndyCar had two 250-lap races at the track using a double header format with both races taking place at night on July 17 and 18. On September 30, 2020, IndyCar revealed their 2021 schedule and announced that due to financial issues with the Iowa Speedway their date had been dropped from the schedule along with Richmond Raceway, the latter not hosting a race in 2020 due to COVID-19 restrictions in the state of Virginia.

Iowa was left off the calendar for 2021, to the disappointment of fans and drivers alike. Former series champion and team owner Bobby Rahal managed to secure new sponsorship for the event from Iowa supermarket chain Hy-Vee and was successful in returning IndyCar racing to the speedway on a multi year agreement starting in 2022. A double header race weekend will be used as the format for the event going forward, with one 250 lap race and one 300 lap race. For 2025, Sukup Manufacturing sponsored the races and extended the race from 250 laps to 275 laps. On September 16, it was confirmed that Iowa would not return to the calendar.

== Race 1 ==
Synk 275 Powered by Sukup
IndyCar Series
- Venue: Iowa Speedway
- First race: 2007
- Last race: 2025
- Distance: 240.625 miles (387.248 km)
- Laps: 275
- Previous names: Iowa Corn Indy 250 (2007–2013); Iowa Corn Indy 300 (2014–2015); Iowa Corn 300 (2016–2018); Iowa 300 (2019); Iowa IndyCar 250 (2020); Hy-VeeDeals.com 250 presented by DoorDash (2022); Hy-Vee Homefront 250 presented by Instacart (2023–2024)
- Most wins (driver): Josef Newgarden (6)
- Most wins (team): Team Penske (6)
- Most wins (manufacturer): Chassis: Dallara (18); Engine: Chevrolet (11)

The Synk 275 Powered by Sukup is an IndyCar Series race held at Iowa Speedway in Newton, Iowa. Pato O'Ward was the final race winner.

=== Past winners ===
Season	Date	Driver	Team	Chassis	Engine	Race Distance		Race Time	Average Speed	Report
Season	Date	Driver	Team	Chassis	Engine	Laps	Miles (km)	Race Time	Average Speed	Report
2007	June 24	(United Kingdom) Dario Franchitti	Andretti Green Racing	Dallara	Honda	250	218.75 (352.044)	1:48:14	123.896 mph (199.391 km/h)	Report
2008	June 22	(United Kingdom) Dan Wheldon	Chip Ganassi Racing	Dallara	Honda	250	218.75 (352.044)	1:38:36	136.007 mph (218.882 km/h)	Report
2009	June 21	(United Kingdom) Dario Franchitti (2)	Chip Ganassi Racing (2)	Dallara	Honda	250	218.75 (352.044)	1:39:48	134.371 mph (216.249 km/h)	Report
2010	June 20	(Brazil) Tony Kanaan	Andretti Autosport (2)	Dallara	Honda	250	218.75 (352.044)	1:42:13	131.205 mph (211.154 km/h)	Report
2011	June 25	(United States) Marco Andretti	Andretti Autosport (3)	Dallara	Honda	250	218.75 (352.044)	1:53:00	118.671 mph (190.982 km/h)	Report
2012	June 23	(United States) Ryan Hunter-Reay	Andretti Autosport (4)	Dallara	Chevrolet	250	218.75 (352.044)	1:43:39	129.371 mph (208.202 km/h)	Report
2013	June 23	(Canada) James Hinchcliffe	Andretti Autosport (5)	Dallara	Chevrolet	250	218.75 (352.044)	1:30:16	148.559 mph (239.083 km/h)	Report
2014	July 12	(United States) Ryan Hunter-Reay (2)	Andretti Autosport (6)	Dallara	Honda	300	262.5 (422.452)	2:01:59	131.923 mph (212.309 km/h)	Report
2015	July 18	(United States) Ryan Hunter-Reay (3)	Andretti Autosport (7)	Dallara	Honda	300	262.5 (422.452)	2:03:50	129.943 mph (209.123 km/h)	Report
2016	July 10	(United States) Josef Newgarden	Ed Carpenter Racing	Dallara	Chevrolet	300	262.5 (422.452)	1:52:16	143.330 mph (230.667 km/h)	Report
2017	July 9	(Brazil) Hélio Castroneves	Team Penske	Dallara	Chevrolet	300	262.5 (422.452)	1:55:11	139.702 mph (224.829 km/h)	Report
2018	July 8	(Canada) James Hinchcliffe	Schmidt Peterson Motorsports	Dallara	Honda	300	262.5 (422.452)	1:47:32	149.636 mph (240.816 km/h)	Report
2019*	July 20–21*	(United States) Josef Newgarden (2)	Team Penske (2)	Dallara	Chevrolet	300	262.5 (422.452)	1:56:53	137.664 mph (221.549 km/h)	Report
2020	July 17	(France) Simon Pagenaud	Team Penske (3)	Dallara	Chevrolet	250	218.75 (352.044)	1:41:25	132.220 mph (212.787 km/h)	Report
2021	Not held									
2022	July 23	(United States) Josef Newgarden (4)	Team Penske (5)	Dallara	Chevrolet	250	218.75 (352.044)	1:39:34	134.674 mph (216.737 km/h)	Report
2023	July 22	(United States) Josef Newgarden (5)	Team Penske (6)	Dallara	Chevrolet	250	223.5 (359.688)	1:33:40	143.155 mph (230.386 km/h)	Report
2024	July 13	(New Zealand) Scott McLaughlin	Team Penske (8)	Dallara	Chevrolet	250	223.5 (359.688)	1:44:41	128.098 mph (206.154 km/h)	Report
2025	July 12	(Mexico) Pato O'Ward (2)	Arrow McLaren (2)	Dallara	Chevrolet	275	240.625 (387.248)	1:46:00	139.146 mph (223.934 km/h)	Report

- 2019: Race finished after midnight on Sunday after being postponed same day due to lightning policy.

== Race 2 ==
Farm to Finish 275 Powered by Sukup
IndyCar Series
- Venue: Iowa Speedway
- First race: 2020
- Last race: 2025
- Distance: 240.625 miles (387.248 km)
- Laps: 275
- Previous names: Iowa IndyCar 250 (2020); Hy-Vee Salute to Farmers 300 presented by Google (2022); Hy-Vee One Step 250 presented by Gatorade (2023–2024)
- Most wins (driver): Josef Newgarden (2)
- Most wins (team): Team Penske (3)
- Most wins (manufacturer): Chassis: Dallara (5); Engine: Chevrolet (4)

The Farm to Finish 275 Powered by Sukup is an IndyCar Series race held at Iowa Speedway in Newton, Iowa. Álex Palou was the final race winner.

=== Past winners ===
Season	Date	Driver	Team	Chassis	Engine	Race Distance		Race Time	Average Speed	Report
Season	Date	Driver	Team	Chassis	Engine	Laps	Miles (km)	Race Time	Average Speed	Report
2020	July 18	(United States) Josef Newgarden (3)	Team Penske (4)	Dallara	Chevrolet	250	218.75 (352.044)	1:38:40	135.900 mph (218.710 km/h)	Report
2021	Not held									
2022	July 24	(Mexico) Pato O'Ward	Arrow McLaren SP	Dallara	Chevrolet	300	262.5 (422.452)	1:54:23	140.681 mph (226.404 km/h)	Report
2023	July 23	(United States) Josef Newgarden (6)	Team Penske (7)	Dallara	Chevrolet	250	223.5 (359.688)	1:40:25	133.527 mph (214.891 km/h)	Report
2024	July 14	(Australia) Will Power	Team Penske (9)	Dallara	Chevrolet	250	223.5 (359.688)	1:26:38	154.768 mph (249.075 km/h)	Report
2025	July 13	(Spain) Álex Palou	Chip Ganassi Racing (3)	Dallara	Honda	275	240.625 (387.248)	1:48:39	135.761 mph (218.486 km/h)	Report

== Support winners ==
=== Indy Pro Series/Indy Lights/Indy NXT ===
Season	Date	Driver	Team	Chassis	Engine	Race Distance		Race Time	Average Speed
Season	Date	Driver	Team	Chassis	Engine	Laps	Miles (km)	Race Time	Average Speed
Indy Pro Series
2007	June 23	(United Kingdom) Alex Lloyd	Sam Schmidt Motorsports	Dallara	Infiniti	115	100.625 (161.94)	0:53:19	115.707 mph (186.212 km/h)
Indy Lights
2008	June 21	(United Kingdom) Dillon Battistini	Panther Racing	Dallara	Infiniti	115	100.625 (161.94)	0:47:06	130.986 mph (210.802 km/h)
2009	June 20	(Brazil) Ana Beatriz	Sam Schmidt Motorsports	Dallara	Infiniti	115	100.625 (161.94)	0:48:05	128.285 mph (206.455 km/h)
2010	June 19	(Colombia) Sebastián Saavedra	Bryan Herta Autosport	Dallara	Infiniti	115	100.625 (161.94)	0:46:10	133.614 mph (215.031 km/h)
2011	June 25	(United States) Josef Newgarden	Sam Schmidt Motorsports	Dallara	Infiniti	115	100.625 (161.94)	0:40:27	152.478 mph (245.390 km/h)
2012	June 23	(Argentina) Esteban Guerrieri	Sam Schmidt Motorsports	Dallara	Infiniti	115	100.625 (161.94)	0:40:59	150.530 mph (242.255 km/h)
2013	June 22	(United States) Sage Karam	Schmidt Peterson Motorsports	Dallara	Infiniti	115	100.625 (161.94)	0:39:59	154.274 mph (248.280 km/h)
2014	Not held								
2015	July 18	(United Kingdom) Max Chilton	Carlin	Dallara	Mazda	100	87.5 (140.817)	0:36:50	145.621 mph (234.354 km/h)
2016	July 10	(Puerto Rico) Félix Serrallés	Carlin	Dallara	Mazda	100	87.5 (140.817)	0:34:45	154.396 mph (248.476 km/h)
2017	July 9	(Brazil) Matheus Leist	Carlin	Dallara	Mazda	100	87.5 (140.817)	0:37:08	144.436 mph (232.447 km/h)
2018	July 8	(Mexico) Patricio O'Ward	Andretti Autosport	Dallara	Mazda	100	87.5 (140.817)	0:34:37	154.935 mph (249.344 km/h)
2019 – 2021	Not held								
2022	July 23	(New Zealand) Hunter McElrea	Andretti Autosport	Dallara	AER	75	67.05 (107.907)	0:29:52	134.693 mph (216.767 km/h)
Indy NXT
2023	July 22	(Denmark) Christian Rasmussen	HMD Motorsports with Dale Coyne Racing	Dallara	AER	75	67.05 (107.907)	0:27:54	144.126 mph (231.948 km/h)
2024	July 13	(United Kingdom) Louis Foster	Andretti Global	Dallara	AER	55	67.05 (107.907)	0:27:28	107.372 mph (172.798 km/h)
2025	July 12	(United States) Myles Rowe	Abel Motorsports with Force Indy	Dallara	AER	75	67.05 (107.907)	0:28:05	143.200 mph (230.458 km/h)

=== ARCA ===
Starting in 2015 until 2020, the race was held as a support race for the IndyCar weekend.

Year	Date	Driver	Manufacturer	Race Distance		Race Time	Average Speed	Ref
Year	Date	Driver	Manufacturer	Laps	Miles (km)	Race Time	Average Speed	Ref
2015	July 17	Mason Mitchell	Chevrolet	159*	139.125 (223.90)	1:42:36	81.364 mph (130.943 km/h)	
2016	July 17	Chase Briscoe	Ford	150	131.25 (211.23)	1:14:42	105.403 mph (169.630 km/h)	
2017	July 8	Dalton Sargeant	Ford	150	131.25 (211.23)	1:27:30	90.395 mph (145.477 km/h)	
2018	July 7	Sheldon Creed	Toyota	150	131.25 (211.23)	1:19:56	98.521 mph (158.554 km/h)	
2019	July 19	Chandler Smith	Toyota	150	131.25 (211.23)	1:20:40	97.624 mph (157.111 km/h)	
2020	July 18	Ty Gibbs	Toyota	150	131.25 (211.23)	1:22:23	95.590 mph (153.837 km/h)	

- 2015: Race extended due to NASCAR overtime.

=== U.S. F2000 National Championship ===
Season	Date	Driver	Team	Race Distance		Race Time	Average Speed
Season	Date	Driver	Team	Laps	Miles (km)	Race Time	Average Speed
2010	June 19	Sage Karam	Andretti Autosport	50	43.75 (70.393)	0:21:04.212	??
2011 – 2016	Not held						
2017	July 9	Oliver Askew	Cape Motorsports	60	52.50 (84.491)	0:24:48.4972	126.970 mph (204.338 km/h)

=== Pro Mazda ===
Season	Date	Driver	Team	Race Distance		Race Time	Average Speed
Season	Date	Driver	Team	Laps	Miles (km)	Race Time	Average Speed
2009	July 10	Peter Dempsey	Juncos Racing	100	87.500 (140.7875)	0:55:14.150	??
2010	June 19	Conor Daly	Juncos Racing	100	87.500 (140.7875)	0:42:53.893	122.383 mph (196.956 km/h)
2011	June 25	Sage Karam	Andretti Autosport	100	87.500 (140.7875)	0:39:01.725	137.437 mph (221.183 km/h)
2012	June 23	Sage Karam	Andretti Autosport	91	79.625 (128.1166)	0:40:09.461	121.552 mph (195.619 km/h)
2013 – 2014	Not held						
2015	July 18	Weiron Tan	Andretti Autosport	100	87.50 (140.8176)	0:42:28.9554	123.580 mph (198.883 km/h)

=== USAC National Midget Championship ===
Season	Date	Driver	Race Distance	
Season	Date	Driver	Laps	Miles (km)
2009	June 19	Bobby Santos III	30	26.25 mi (42.25 km)
2011	June 24	Caleb Armstrong	50	43.75 mi (70.41 km)
2012	June 22	Bobby Santos III	30	26.25 mi (42.25 km)

=== USAC Silver Crown Series ===
Season	Date	Driver	Race Distance	
Season	Date	Driver	Laps	Miles (km)
2011	June 24	Bobby East	100	87.50 mi (140.82 km)
2012	June 22	Bobby East	100	87.50 mi (140.82 km)
