= 2025 Sukup IndyCar Race Weekend =

IndyCar races held in Newton, Iowa

(United States) 2025 Sukup IndyCar Race Weekend
Race details
11th and 12th round of the 2025 IndyCar season
← Previous race	Next race →
- Layout of the Iowa Speedway circuit
- Date: July 12–13, 2025
- Official name: Sukup IndyCar Race Weekend
- Location: Iowa Speedway
- Course: Permanent racing facility 0.894 mi / 1.439 km
- Distance: 275 laps 240.625 mi / 387.248 km

Podium

Chronology
Previous	Next
2024	2026

The 2025 Sukup IndyCar Race Weekend were a pair of IndyCar motor races held on July 12, 2025, and July 13, 2025, at Iowa Speedway in Newton, Iowa. They were the 11th and 12th rounds of the 2025 IndyCar season.

== Practice ==
The first and only practice session was originally scheduled to be held on Friday, July 11, at 3:30 PM ET, but was postponed due to inclement weather. Practice was rescheduled for Saturday, July 12, at 10:00 AM ET and would last for 60 minutes. Scott McLaughlin, driving for Team Penske, was the fastest in the session with a lap time of 00:17:6211.

Top Practice Speeds
Pos	No.	Driver	Team	Engine	Lap Time
1	3	(New Zealand) Scott McLaughlin W	Team Penske	Chevrolet	00:17.5376
2	6	(United States) Nolan Siegel R	Arrow McLaren	Chevrolet	00:17.6211
3	20	(United States) Alexander Rossi	ECR	Chevrolet	00:17.6339
Practice results

== Race 1 - Synk 275 Powered by Sukup ==
(United States) 2025 Synk 275 Powered by Sukup
Race details
- 11th round of the 2025 IndyCar season
- Layout of the Iowa Speedway circuit
- Date: July 12, 2025
- Official name: Synk 275 Powered by Sukup
- Location: Iowa Speedway
- Course: Permanent racing facility 0.894 mi / 1.439 km
- Distance: 275 laps 240.625 mi / 387.248 km

Pole position
- Driver: (United States) Josef Newgarden (Team Penske)
- Time: 00:17.4914

Fastest lap
- Driver: (Mexico) Pato O'Ward (Arrow McLaren)
- Time: 00:18.0170 (on lap 275 of 275)

Podium
- First: (Mexico) Pato O'Ward (Arrow McLaren)
- Second: (United States) Josef Newgarden (Team Penske)
- Third: (Australia) Will Power (Team Penske)

The 2025 Synk 275 Powered by Sukup was the eleventh round of the 2025 IndyCar season. The race was held on July 12, 2025, in Newton, Iowa at Iowa Speedway. The race was contested of 275 laps. Pato O'Ward won the race in his 100th IndyCar Series start, Josef Newgarden finished 2nd, and Will Power finished 3rd. Scott McLaughlin and Álex Palou rounded out the top five, while Christian Rasmussen, Conor Daly, Santino Ferrucci, Marcus Armstrong, and Scott Dixon rounded out the top ten.

=== Entry list ===
Key	Meaning
R	Rookie
W	Past winner

No.	Driver	Team	Engine
2	(United States) Josef Newgarden W	Team Penske	Chevrolet
3	(New Zealand) Scott McLaughlin W	Team Penske	Chevrolet
4	(United States) David Malukas	A. J. Foyt Racing	Chevrolet
5	(Mexico) Pato O'Ward W	Arrow McLaren	Chevrolet
6	(United States) Nolan Siegel R	Arrow McLaren	Chevrolet
7	(Denmark) Christian Lundgaard	Arrow McLaren	Chevrolet
8	(Cayman Islands) Kyffin Simpson	Chip Ganassi Racing	Honda
9	(New Zealand) Scott Dixon	Chip Ganassi Racing	Honda
10	(Spain) Álex Palou	Chip Ganassi Racing	Honda
12	(Australia) Will Power W	Team Penske	Chevrolet
14	(United States) Santino Ferrucci	A. J. Foyt Racing	Chevrolet
15	(United States) Graham Rahal	Rahal Letterman Lanigan Racing	Honda
18	(Netherlands) Rinus VeeKay	Dale Coyne Racing	Honda
20	(United States) Alexander Rossi	ECR	Chevrolet
21	(Denmark) Christian Rasmussen	ECR	Chevrolet
26	(United States) Colton Herta	Andretti Global with Curb-Agajanian	Honda
27	(United States) Kyle Kirkwood	Andretti Global	Honda
28	(Sweden) Marcus Ericsson	Andretti Global	Honda
30	(Canada) Devlin DeFrancesco	Rahal Letterman Lanigan Racing	Honda
45	(United Kingdom) Louis Foster R	Rahal Letterman Lanigan Racing	Honda
51	(United States) Jacob Abel R	Dale Coyne Racing	Honda
60	(Sweden) Felix Rosenqvist	Meyer Shank Racing	Honda
66	(New Zealand) Marcus Armstrong	Meyer Shank Racing	Honda
76	(United States) Conor Daly	Juncos Hollinger Racing	Chevrolet
77	(United States) Sting Ray Robb	Juncos Hollinger Racing	Chevrolet
83	(Israel) Robert Shwartzman R	Prema Racing	Chevrolet
90	(United Kingdom) Callum Ilott	Prema Racing	Chevrolet

=== Qualifying ===
Qualifying was scheduled to be held at 12:00 PM ET on July 12, 2025, but was postponed to 1:30 PM ET. For qualifying, each entrant turned two consecutive laps, with their first lap time counting towards Race 1 qualifying and their second lap counting for Race 2 qualifying. Josef Newgarden, driving for Team Penske, would earn the pole for the first race.

==== Qualifying classification ====
Pos	No.	Driver	Team	Engine	Time	Final grid							
Pos	No.	Driver	Team	Engine	Time	Final grid	1	2	(United States) Josef Newgarden W	Team Penske	Chevrolet	00:17.4914	1
Pos	No.	Driver	Team	Engine	2	Final grid	76	(United States) Conor Daly	Juncos Hollinger Racing	Chevrolet	00:17.5185	2	
3	60	(Sweden) Felix Rosenqvist	Meyer Shank Racing	Honda	00:17.5261	3							
4	10	(Spain) Álex Palou	Chip Ganassi Racing	Honda	00:17.5298	4							
5	5	(Mexico) Pato O'Ward W	Arrow McLaren	Chevrolet	00:17.5777	5							
6	9	(New Zealand) Scott Dixon	Chip Ganassi Racing	Honda	00:17.5942	6							
7	12	(Australia) Will Power W	Team Penske	Chevrolet	00:17.6038	7							
8	6	(United States) Nolan Siegel R	Arrow McLaren	Chevrolet	00:17.6055	8							
9	14	(United States) Santino Ferrucci	A. J. Foyt Racing	Chevrolet	00:17.6104	9							
10	4	(United States) David Malukas	A. J. Foyt Racing	Chevrolet	00:17.6258	10							
11	66	(New Zealand) Marcus Armstrong	Meyer Shank Racing	Honda	00:17.6367	11							
12	45	(United Kingdom) Louis Foster R	Rahal Letterman Lanigan Racing	Honda	00:17.6466	12							
13	20	(United States) Alexander Rossi	ECR	Chevrolet	00:17.6894	13							
14	15	(United States) Graham Rahal	Rahal Letterman Lanigan Racing	Honda	00:17.7344	14							
15	28	(Sweden) Marcus Ericsson	Andretti Global	Honda	00:17.7358	15							
16	83	(Israel) Robert Shwartzman R	Prema Racing	Chevrolet	00:17.7499	16							
17	90	(United Kingdom) Callum Ilott	Prema Racing	Chevrolet	00:17.7560	17							
18	27	(United States) Kyle Kirkwood	Andretti Global	Honda	00:17.7685	18							
19	21	(Denmark) Christian Rasmussen	ECR	Chevrolet	00:17.7707	19							
20	30	(Canada) Devlin DeFrancesco	Rahal Letterman Lanigan Racing	Honda	00:17.7717	20							
21	7	(Denmark) Christian Lundgaard	Arrow McLaren	Chevrolet	00:17.8825	21							
22	8	(Cayman Islands) Kyffin Simpson	Chip Ganassi Racing	Honda	00:17.8834	22							
23	26	(United States) Colton Herta	Andretti Global with Curb-Agajanian	Honda	00:17.9528	23							
24	77	(United States) Sting Ray Robb	Juncos Hollinger Racing	Chevrolet	00:17.9914	24							
25	18	(Netherlands) Rinus VeeKay	Dale Coyne Racing	Honda	00:18.1669	25							
26	51	(United States) Jacob Abel R	Dale Coyne Racing	Honda	00:18.3641	26							
27	3	(New Zealand) Scott McLaughlin W	Team Penske	Chevrolet	—	27							
Qualifying results

=== Race ===
The race was held at 5:00 PM ET on July 12, 2025. Pato O'Ward, driving for Arrow McLaren, would earn his eighth-career win in his 100th start.

==== Race classification ====
Pos	No.	Driver	Team	Engine	Laps	Time/Retired	Pit Stops	Grid	Laps Led	Pts.
1	5	(Mexico) Pato O'Ward W	Arrow McLaren	Chevrolet	275	01:46:00.6760	4	5	33	51
2	2	(United States) Josef Newgarden W	Team Penske	Chevrolet	275	+0.2352	4	1	232	44
3	12	(Australia) Will Power W	Team Penske	Chevrolet	275	+1.2128	4	7	3	36
4	3	(New Zealand) Scott McLaughlin W	Team Penske	Chevrolet	275	+2.3576	4	27	0	32
5	10	(Spain) Álex Palou	Chip Ganassi Racing	Honda	275	+3.0020	4	4	4	31
6	21	(Denmark) Christian Rasmussen	ECR	Chevrolet	275	+3.6218	4	19	0	28
7	76	(United States) Conor Daly	Juncos Hollinger Racing	Chevrolet	275	+3.7720	4	2	0	26
8	14	(United States) Santino Ferrucci	A. J. Foyt Racing	Chevrolet	275	+4.0938	4	9	0	24
9	66	(New Zealand) Marcus Armstrong	Meyer Shank Racing	Honda	275	+4.9885	4	11	3	23
10	9	(New Zealand) Scott Dixon	Chip Ganassi Racing	Honda	275	+5.5263	4	6	0	20
11	15	(United States) Graham Rahal	Rahal Letterman Lanigan Racing	Honda	275	+6.1942	4	14	0	19
12	4	(United States) David Malukas	A. J. Foyt Racing	Chevrolet	275	+6.3619	4	10	0	18
13	26	(United States) Colton Herta	Andretti Global with Curb-Agajanian	Honda	275	+7.2357	4	23	0	17
14	45	(United Kingdom) Louis Foster R	Rahal Letterman Lanigan Racing	Honda	275	+7.9742	5	12	0	16
15	28	(Sweden) Marcus Ericsson	Andretti Global	Honda	275	+8.2510	5	15	0	15
16	18	(Netherlands) Rinus VeeKay	Dale Coyne Racing	Honda	274	+1 Lap	4	25	0	14
17	60	(Sweden) Felix Rosenqvist	Meyer Shank Racing	Honda	274	+1 Lap	4	3	0	13
18	8	(Cayman Islands) Kyffin Simpson	Chip Ganassi Racing	Honda	274	+1 Lap	4	22	0	12
19	30	(Canada) Devlin DeFrancesco	Rahal Letterman Lanigan Racing	Honda	274	+1 Lap	4	20	0	11
20	83	(Israel) Robert Shwartzman R	Prema Racing	Chevrolet	274	+1 Lap	4	16	0	10
21	7	(Denmark) Christian Lundgaard	Arrow McLaren	Chevrolet	274	+1 Lap	4	21	0	9
22	77	(United States) Sting Ray Robb	Juncos Hollinger Racing	Chevrolet	274	+1 Lap	4	24	0	8
23	90	(United Kingdom) Callum Ilott	Prema Racing	Chevrolet	261	Contact	6	17	0	7
24	6	(United States) Nolan Siegel R	Arrow McLaren	Chevrolet	246	Contact	3	8	0	6
25	20	(United States) Alexander Rossi	ECR	Chevrolet	236	Mechanical	3	13	0	5
26	27	(United States) Kyle Kirkwood	Andretti Global	Honda	151	Contact	1	18	0	5
27	51	(United States) Jacob Abel R	Dale Coyne Racing	Honda	72	Contact	0	26	0	5
Fastest lap: (Mexico) Pato O'Ward (Arrow McLaren) – 18.0170 (lap 275)
Race results

=== Championship standings after the race ===
Drivers' Championship standings

	Pos.	Driver	Points
Unchanged	1	(Spain) Álex Palou	461
1	2	(Mexico) Pato O'Ward	356 (–105)
1	3	(United States) Kyle Kirkwood	322 (–139)
Unchanged	4	(New Zealand) Scott Dixon	302 (–159)
Unchanged	5	(Denmark) Christian Lundgaard	272 (–189)

Engine manufacturer standings

	Pos.	Manufacturer	Points
Unchanged	1	Honda	969
Unchanged	2	Chevrolet	797 (–172)

- Note: Only the top five positions are included.

== Race 2 - Farm to Finish 275 Powered by Sukup ==
(United States) 2025 Farm to Finish 275 Powered by Sukup
Race details
- 12th round of the 2025 IndyCar season
- Layout of the Iowa Speedway circuit
- Date: July 13, 2025
- Official name: Farm to Finish 275 Powered by Sukup
- Location: Iowa Speedway
- Course: Permanent racing facility 0.894 mi / 1.439 km
- Distance: 275 laps 240.625 mi / 387.248 km

Pole position
- Driver: (Spain) Álex Palou (Chip Ganassi Racing)
- Time: 00:17.4900

Fastest lap
- Driver: (United States) David Malukas (A. J. Foyt Racing)
- Time: 00:17.8838 (on lap 275 of 275)

Podium
- First: (Spain) Álex Palou (Chip Ganassi Racing)
- Second: (New Zealand) Scott Dixon (Chip Ganassi Racing)
- Third: (New Zealand) Marcus Armstrong (Meyer Shank Racing)

The 2025 Farm to Finish 275 Powered by Sukup was the twelfth round of the 2025 IndyCar season. The race was held on July 13, 2025, in Newton, Iowa at Iowa Speedway. The race was contested of 275 laps. Álex Palou won the race, Scott Dixon finished 2nd, and Marcus Armstrong finished 3rd. David Malukas and Pato O'Ward rounded out the top five, while Christian Lundgaard, Felix Rosenqvist, Christian Rasmussen, Robert Shwartzman, and Josef Newgarden rounded out the top ten.

=== Entry list ===
Key	Meaning
R	Rookie
W	Past winner

No.	Driver	Team	Engine
2	(United States) Josef Newgarden W	Team Penske	Chevrolet
3	(New Zealand) Scott McLaughlin W	Team Penske	Chevrolet
4	(United States) David Malukas	A. J. Foyt Racing	Chevrolet
5	(Mexico) Pato O'Ward W	Arrow McLaren	Chevrolet
6	(United States) Nolan Siegel R	Arrow McLaren	Chevrolet
7	(Denmark) Christian Lundgaard	Arrow McLaren	Chevrolet
8	(Cayman Islands) Kyffin Simpson	Chip Ganassi Racing	Honda
9	(New Zealand) Scott Dixon	Chip Ganassi Racing	Honda
10	(Spain) Álex Palou	Chip Ganassi Racing	Honda
12	(Australia) Will Power W	Team Penske	Chevrolet
14	(United States) Santino Ferrucci	A. J. Foyt Racing	Chevrolet
15	(United States) Graham Rahal	Rahal Letterman Lanigan Racing	Honda
18	(Netherlands) Rinus VeeKay	Dale Coyne Racing	Honda
20	(United States) Alexander Rossi	ECR	Chevrolet
21	(Denmark) Christian Rasmussen	ECR	Chevrolet
26	(United States) Colton Herta	Andretti Global with Curb-Agajanian	Honda
27	(United States) Kyle Kirkwood	Andretti Global	Honda
28	(Sweden) Marcus Ericsson	Andretti Global	Honda
30	(Canada) Devlin DeFrancesco	Rahal Letterman Lanigan Racing	Honda
45	(United Kingdom) Louis Foster R	Rahal Letterman Lanigan Racing	Honda
51	(United States) Jacob Abel R	Dale Coyne Racing	Honda
60	(Sweden) Felix Rosenqvist	Meyer Shank Racing	Honda
66	(New Zealand) Marcus Armstrong	Meyer Shank Racing	Honda
76	(United States) Conor Daly	Juncos Hollinger Racing	Chevrolet
77	(United States) Sting Ray Robb	Juncos Hollinger Racing	Chevrolet
83	(Israel) Robert Shwartzman R	Prema Racing	Chevrolet
90	(United Kingdom) Callum Ilott	Prema Racing	Chevrolet

=== Qualifying ===
Qualifying for Race 2 will take place at the same time as for Race 1, with their first lap time counting towards Race 1 qualifying and their second lap counting for Race 2 qualifying. Álex Palou, driving for Chip Ganassi Racing, would earn his tenth career pole and fourth of the season, with a time of 00:17.4900.

==== Qualifying classification ====
Pos	No.	Driver	Team	Engine	Time	Final grid							
Pos	No.	Driver	Team	Engine	Time	Final grid	1	10	(Spain) Álex Palou	Chip Ganassi Racing	Honda	00:17.4900	1
Pos	No.	Driver	Team	Engine	2	Final grid	60	(Sweden) Felix Rosenqvist	Meyer Shank Racing	Honda	00:17.4937	2	
3	4	(United States) David Malukas	A. J. Foyt Racing	Chevrolet	00:17.5515	3							
4	2	(United States) Josef Newgarden W	Team Penske	Chevrolet	00:17.5566	4							
5	6	(United States) Nolan Siegel R	Arrow McLaren	Chevrolet	00:17.5683	5							
6	12	(Australia) Will Power W	Team Penske	Chevrolet	00:17.5800	6							
7	76	(United States) Conor Daly	Juncos Hollinger Racing	Chevrolet	00:17.5924	7							
8	9	(New Zealand) Scott Dixon	Chip Ganassi Racing	Honda	00:17.6192	8							
9	5	(Mexico) Pato O'Ward W	Arrow McLaren	Chevrolet	00:17.6211	9							
10	15	(United States) Graham Rahal	Rahal Letterman Lanigan Racing	Honda	00:17.6361	10							
11	83	(Israel) Robert Shwartzman R	Prema Racing	Chevrolet	00:17.6406	11							
12	66	(New Zealand) Marcus Armstrong	Meyer Shank Racing	Honda	00:17.6439	12							
13	90	(United Kingdom) Callum Ilott	Prema Racing	Chevrolet	00:17.6627	13							
14	28	(Sweden) Marcus Ericsson	Andretti Global	Honda	00:17.6686	14							
15	20	(United States) Alexander Rossi	ECR	Chevrolet	00:17.6985	15							
16	45	(United Kingdom) Louis Foster R	Rahal Letterman Lanigan Racing	Honda	00:17.7025	16							
17	21	(Denmark) Christian Rasmussen	ECR	Chevrolet	00:17.7146	17							
18	8	(Cayman Islands) Kyffin Simpson	Chip Ganassi Racing	Honda	00:17.7235	18							
19	26	(United States) Colton Herta	Andretti Global with Curb-Agajanian	Honda	00:17.7350	19							
20	14	(United States) Santino Ferrucci	A. J. Foyt Racing	Chevrolet	00:17.7611	20							
21	27	(United States) Kyle Kirkwood	Andretti Global	Honda	00:17.7635	21							
22	7	(Denmark) Christian Lundgaard	Arrow McLaren	Chevrolet	00:17.7891	22							
23	30	(Canada) Devlin DeFrancesco	Rahal Letterman Lanigan Racing	Honda	00:17.8143	23							
24	77	(United States) Sting Ray Robb	Juncos Hollinger Racing	Chevrolet	00:18.1132	24							
25	51	(United States) Jacob Abel R	Dale Coyne Racing	Honda	00:18.1682	25							
26	18	(Netherlands) Rinus VeeKay	Dale Coyne Racing	Honda	00:18.8407	26							
27	3	(New Zealand) Scott McLaughlin W	Team Penske	Chevrolet	—	27							
Qualifying results

=== Race ===
The race was held at 1:00 PM ET on July 13, 2025. Before the race, Nolan Siegel was not cleared by IndyCar Medical and would not compete. Álex Palou, driving for Chip Ganassi Racing, would earn his 18th career victory and seventh of the year.

==== Race classification ====
Pos	No.	Driver	Team	Engine	Laps	Time/Retired	Pit Stops	Grid	Laps Led	Pts.
1	10	(Spain) Álex Palou	Chip Ganassi Racing	Honda	275	01:48:39.2641	4	1	194	54
2	9	(New Zealand) Scott Dixon	Chip Ganassi Racing	Honda	275	+0.5280	4	8	0	40
3	66	(New Zealand) Marcus Armstrong	Meyer Shank Racing	Honda	275	+2.7436	4	12	0	35
4	4	(United States) David Malukas	A. J. Foyt Racing	Chevrolet	275	+4.0007	4	3	0	32
5	5	(Mexico) Pato O'Ward W	Arrow McLaren	Chevrolet	275	+4.8250	4	9	0	30
6	7	(Denmark) Christian Lundgaard	Arrow McLaren	Chevrolet	275	+6.4378	4	22	0	28
7	60	(Sweden) Felix Rosenqvist	Meyer Shank Racing	Honda	275	+6.9021	4	2	0	26
8	21	(Denmark) Christian Rasmussen	ECR	Chevrolet	275	+7.8354	4	17	0	24
9	83	(Israel) Robert Shwartzman R	Prema Racing	Chevrolet	275	+9.0457	4	11	0	22
10	2	(United States) Josef Newgarden W	Team Penske	Chevrolet	275	+10.1300	5	4	72	21
11	51	(United States) Jacob Abel R	Dale Coyne Racing	Honda	275	+11.8122	5	25	0	19
12	18	(Netherlands) Rinus VeeKay	Dale Coyne Racing	Honda	275	+11.8317	4	26	0	18
13	8	(Cayman Islands) Kyffin Simpson	Chip Ganassi Racing	Honda	275	+13.4066	3	18	0	17
14	45	(United Kingdom) Louis Foster R	Rahal Letterman Lanigan Racing	Honda	275	+14.5475	4	16	0	16
15	14	(United States) Santino Ferrucci	A. J. Foyt Racing	Chevrolet	274	+1 Lap	4	20	0	15
16	76	(United States) Conor Daly	Juncos Hollinger Racing	Chevrolet	274	+1 Lap	4	7	0	14
17	20	(United States) Alexander Rossi	ECR	Chevrolet	274	+1 Lap	4	15	0	13
18	27	(United States) Kyle Kirkwood	Andretti Global	Honda	274	+1 Lap	3	21	1	13
19	15	(United States) Graham Rahal	Rahal Letterman Lanigan Racing	Honda	272	+3 Laps	5	10	0	11
20	26	(United States) Colton Herta	Andretti Global with Curb-Agajanian	Honda	252	Accident	3	19	0	10
21	90	(United Kingdom) Callum Ilott	Prema Racing	Chevrolet	173	Accident	2	13	0	9
22	28	(Sweden) Marcus Ericsson	Andretti Global	Honda	127	Accident	1	14	0	8
23	77	(United States) Sting Ray Robb	Juncos Hollinger Racing	Chevrolet	48	Accident	1	24	0	7
24	12	(Australia) Will Power W	Team Penske	Chevrolet	21	Mechanical	0	6	0	6
25	30	(Canada) Devlin DeFrancesco	Rahal Letterman Lanigan Racing	Honda	0	Accident	0	23	0	5
26	3	(New Zealand) Scott McLaughlin W	Team Penske	Chevrolet	0	Accident	0	27	0	5
27	6	(United States) Nolan Siegel R	Arrow McLaren	Chevrolet	0	Did Not Start	0	5	0	3
Fastest lap: (United States) David Malukas (A. J. Foyt Racing) – 00:17.8838 (lap 275)
Race results

=== Championship standings after the race ===
Drivers' Championship standings

	Pos.	Driver	Points
Unchanged	1	(Spain) Álex Palou	515
Unchanged	2	(Mexico) Pato O'Ward	386 (–129)
1	3	(New Zealand) Scott Dixon	342 (–173)
1	4	(United States) Kyle Kirkwood	335 (–180)
Unchanged	5	(Denmark) Christian Lundgaard	300 (–215)

Engine manufacturer standings

	Pos.	Manufacturer	Points
Unchanged	1	Honda	1147
Unchanged	2	Chevrolet	939 (–208)

- Note: Only the top five positions are included.

Previous race: 2025 Honda Indy 200	NTT IndyCar Series; 2025 season	Next race: 2025 Ontario Honda Dealers Indy Toronto
Previous race: 2024 Hy-Vee IndyCar Race Weekend	IndyCar Series at Iowa Speedway	Next race: Last race
