= 2010 USAC Silver Crown Series =

The 2010 USAC Silver Crown Champ Car Series season was the 39th season of the USAC Silver Crown Series. The series began with the Copper on Dirt at USA Raceway on February 20, and ended on October 16 at the Rollie Beale Classic at Toledo Speedway. Bud Kaeding began the season as the defending champion, and Levi Jones was the season champion.

== Schedule/Results ==
No.	Date	Race title	Track	Winning driver
1	February 20	Copper on Dirt	USA Raceway, Tucson, Arizona	Levi Jones
2	May 22	Casey’s General Stores USAC Triple Crown Pride of Iowa	Iowa Speedway, Newton, Iowa	AJ Fike
3	May 28	Hoosier Hundred	Indiana State Fairgrounds, Indianapolis, Indiana	Shane Hmiel
4	July 22	JD Byrider 100	Lucas Oil Raceway at Indianapolis, Clermont, Indiana	Tracy Hines
5	August 12	Great Lakes 150	Berlin Raceway, Marne, Michigan	Tanner Swanson
6	August 26	Bettenhausen 100	Illinois State Fairgrounds Racetrack, Springfield, Illinois	Rained out
7	September 5	Ted Horn Memorial 100	DuQuoin State Fairgrounds Racetrack, DuQuoin, Illinois	Kody Swanson
8	September 25	Four Crown Nationals	Eldora Speedway, Rossburg, Ohio	Bryan Clauson
9	October 9	Sumar Classic	Terre Haute Action Track, Terre Haute, Indiana	Levi Jones
10	October 14	Rollie Beale 150	Toledo Speedway, Toledo, Ohio	Jerry Coons Jr.

Dirt oval
Pavement oval
