= 2025 Honda Indy 200 =

IndyCar race held in Lexington, Ohio

(United States) 2025 Honda Indy 200
Race details
10th round of the 2025 IndyCar season
| ← Previous race | Next race → |
- Layout of the Mid-Ohio Sports Car Course circuit
- Date: July 6, 2025
- Official name: Honda Indy 200
- Location: Mid-Ohio Sports Car Course, Lexington, Ohio
- Course: Permanent road course 2.258 mi / 3.634 km
- Distance: 90 laps 203.22 mi / 327.05 km

Pole position
- Driver: (Spain) Álex Palou (Chip Ganassi Racing)
- Time: 01:05.0215

Fastest lap
- Driver: (New Zealand) Scott McLaughlin (Team Penske)
- Time: 01:06.5919 (on lap 83 of 90)

Podium
- First: (New Zealand) Scott Dixon (Chip Ganassi Racing)
- Second: (Spain) Álex Palou (Chip Ganassi Racing)
- Third: (Denmark) Christian Lundgaard (Arrow McLaren)

Chronology
| Previous | Next |
|---|---|
| 2024 | 2026 |

The 2025 Honda Indy 200 was the tenth round of the 2025 IndyCar season. The race was held on July 6, 2025, in Lexington, Ohio at the Mid-Ohio Sports Car Course. The race was contested of 90 laps. Scott Dixon won the race, Álex Palou finished 2nd, and Christian Lundgaard finished 3rd. Colton Herta and Pato O'Ward rounded out the top five, while Felix Rosenqvist, Marcus Armstrong, Kyle Kirkwood, Rinus VeeKay, and Kyffin Simpson rounded out the top ten.

== Entry list ==
| Key | Meaning |
|---|---|
| R | Rookie |
| W | Past winner |

| No. | Driver | Team | Engine |
|---|---|---|---|
| 2 | (United States) Josef Newgarden W | Team Penske | Chevrolet |
| 3 | (New Zealand) Scott McLaughlin W | Team Penske | Chevrolet |
| 4 | (United States) David Malukas | A. J. Foyt Racing | Chevrolet |
| 5 | (Mexico) Pato O'Ward W | Arrow McLaren | Chevrolet |
| 6 | (United States) Nolan Siegel R | Arrow McLaren | Chevrolet |
| 7 | (Denmark) Christian Lundgaard | Arrow McLaren | Chevrolet |
| 8 | (Cayman Islands) Kyffin Simpson | Chip Ganassi Racing | Honda |
| 9 | (New Zealand) Scott Dixon W | Chip Ganassi Racing | Honda |
| 10 | (Spain) Álex Palou W | Chip Ganassi Racing | Honda |
| 12 | (Australia) Will Power W | Team Penske | Chevrolet |
| 14 | (United States) Santino Ferrucci | A. J. Foyt Racing | Chevrolet |
| 15 | (United States) Graham Rahal W | Rahal Letterman Lanigan Racing | Honda |
| 18 | (Netherlands) Rinus VeeKay | Dale Coyne Racing | Honda |
| 20 | (United States) Alexander Rossi W | ECR | Chevrolet |
| 21 | (Denmark) Christian Rasmussen | ECR | Chevrolet |
| 26 | (United States) Colton Herta W | Andretti Global with Curb-Agajanian | Honda |
| 27 | (United States) Kyle Kirkwood | Andretti Global | Honda |
| 28 | (Sweden) Marcus Ericsson | Andretti Global | Honda |
| 30 | (Canada) Devlin DeFrancesco | Rahal Letterman Lanigan Racing | Honda |
| 45 | (United Kingdom) Louis Foster R | Rahal Letterman Lanigan Racing | Honda |
| 51 | (United States) Jacob Abel R | Dale Coyne Racing | Honda |
| 60 | (Sweden) Felix Rosenqvist | Meyer Shank Racing | Honda |
| 66 | (New Zealand) Marcus Armstrong | Meyer Shank Racing | Honda |
| 76 | (United States) Conor Daly | Juncos Hollinger Racing | Chevrolet |
| 77 | (United States) Sting Ray Robb | Juncos Hollinger Racing | Chevrolet |
| 83 | (Israel) Robert Shwartzman R | Prema Racing | Chevrolet |
| 90 | (United Kingdom) Callum Ilott | Prema Racing | Chevrolet |

== Practice ==
=== Practice 1 ===
The first practice session was held on Friday, July 4, at 4:30 PM ET, and lasted for 75 minutes. Kyle Kirkwood, driving for Andretti Global, set the fastest lap in the session with a lap of 01:05.8272 and a speed of 123.487 mph (197.949 km/h).

Top Practice Speeds
| Pos | No. | Driver | Team | Engine | Lap Time |
|---|---|---|---|---|---|
| 1 | 27 | (United States) Kyle Kirkwood | Andretti Global | Honda | 01:05.8272 |
| 2 | 5 | (Mexico) Pato O'Ward W | Arrow McLaren | Chevrolet | 01:06.0160 |
| 3 | 10 | (Spain) Álex Palou W | Chip Ganassi Racing | Honda | 01:06.0409 |
Practice 1 results

=== Practice 2 ===
The second and final practice session was held on Saturday, July 5, at 10:30 AM ET, and lasted for 75 minutes. Álex Palou, driving for Chip Ganassi Racing, set the fastest lap in the session with a lap of 01:05.3961 and a speed of 124.301 mph (186.4 km/h).

Top Practice Speeds
| Pos | No. | Driver | Team | Engine | Lap Time |
|---|---|---|---|---|---|
| 1 | 10 | (Spain) Álex Palou W | Chip Ganassi Racing | Honda | 01:05.3961 |
| 2 | 7 | (Denmark) Christian Lundgaard | Arrow McLaren | Chevrolet | 01:05.5529 |
| 3 | 45 | (United Kingdom) Louis Foster R | Rahal Letterman Lanigan Racing | Honda | 01:05.5962 |
Practice 2 results

== Qualifying ==
Qualifying was held at 2:30 PM ET on July 5, 2025. Álex Palou, driving for Chip Ganassi Racing, would earn his ninth career pole, with a time of 01:05.0215, and a speed of 125.017 mph (201.195 km/h).

=== Qualifying classification ===
| Pos | No. | Driver | Team | Engine | Time | Final grid | | | | | | | |
|---|---|---|---|---|---|---|---|---|---|---|---|---|---|
| Pos | No. | Driver | Team | Engine | Time | Final grid | 1 | 10 | (Spain) Álex Palou W | Chip Ganassi Racing | Honda | **01:05.0215** | 1 |
| Pos | No. | Driver | Team | Engine | 2 | Final grid | 7 | (Denmark) Christian Lundgaard | Arrow McLaren | Chevrolet | 01:05.2126 | 2 | |
| 3 | 8 | (Cayman Islands) Kyffin Simpson | Chip Ganassi Racing | Honda | 01:05.7555 | 3 | | | | | | | |
| 4 | 6 | (United States) Nolan Siegel R | Arrow McLaren | Chevrolet | 01:05.9262 | 4 | | | | | | | |
| 5 | 26 | (United States) Colton Herta W | Andretti Global with Curb-Agajanian | Honda | 01:06.1218 | 5 | | | | | | | |
| 6 | 45 | (United Kingdom) Louis Foster R | Rahal Letterman Lanigan Racing | Honda | 01:06.2398 | 6 | | | | | | | |
| 7 | 27 | (United States) Kyle Kirkwood | Andretti Global | Honda | 01:05.4443 | 7 | | | | | | | |
| 8 | 66 | (New Zealand) Marcus Armstrong | Meyer Shank Racing | Honda | 01:05.5469 | 8 | | | | | | | |
| 9 | 9 | (New Zealand) Scott Dixon W | Chip Ganassi Racing | Honda | 01:05.5570 | 9 | | | | | | | |
| 10 | 21 | (Denmark) Christian Rasmussen | ECR | Chevrolet | 01:05.5861 | 10 | | | | | | | |
| 11 | 28 | (Sweden) Marcus Ericsson | Andretti Global | Honda | 01:05.5952 | 11 | | | | | | | |
| 12 | 20 | (United States) Alexander Rossi W | ECR | Chevrolet | 01:05.9275 | 12 | | | | | | | |
| 13 | 76 | (United States) Conor Daly | Juncos Hollinger Racing | Chevrolet | 01:05.7573 | 13 | | | | | | | |
| 14 | 4 | (United States) David Malukas | A. J. Foyt Racing | Chevrolet | 01:05.6384 | 14 | | | | | | | |
| 15 | 5 | (Mexico) Pato O'Ward W | Arrow McLaren | Chevrolet | 01:05.7726 | 15 | | | | | | | |
| 16 | 60 | (Sweden) Felix Rosenqvist | Meyer Shank Racing | Honda | 01:05.6392 | 16 | | | | | | | |
| 17 | 14 | (United States) Santino Ferrucci | A. J. Foyt Racing | Chevrolet | 01:05.8138 | 17 | | | | | | | |
| 18 | 2 | (United States) Josef Newgarden W | Team Penske | Chevrolet | 01:05.6489 | 18 | | | | | | | |
| 19 | 77 | (United States) Sting Ray Robb | Juncos Hollinger Racing | Chevrolet | 01:05.8303 | 19 | | | | | | | |
| 20 | 15 | (United States) Graham Rahal W | Rahal Letterman Lanigan Racing | Honda | 01:05.6728 | 20 | | | | | | | |
| 21 | 3 | (New Zealand) Scott McLaughlin W | Team Penske | Chevrolet | 01:05.8530 | 21 | | | | | | | |
| 22 | 12 | (Australia) Will Power W | Team Penske | Chevrolet | 01:05.6745 | 22 | | | | | | | |
| 23 | 30 | (Canada) Devlin DeFrancesco | Rahal Letterman Lanigan Racing | Honda | 01:06.0593 | 23 | | | | | | | |
| 24 | 90 | (United Kingdom) Callum Ilott | Prema Racing | Chevrolet | 01:05.6757 | 24 | | | | | | | |
| 25 | 51 | (United States) Jacob Abel R | Dale Coyne Racing | Honda | 01:06.6460 | 25 | | | | | | | |
| 26 | 18 | (Netherlands) Rinus VeeKay | Dale Coyne Racing | Honda | 01:05.8516 | 26 | | | | | | | |
| 27 | 83 | (Israel) Robert Shwartzman R | Prema Racing | Chevrolet | 01:06.3827 | 27 | | | | | | | |
Qualifying results

Notes

- **Bold text** indicates fastest time.

== Warmup ==
The warmup was held on Sunday, July 6, at 9:30 AM ET. Felix Rosenqvist, driving for Meyer Shank Racing, set the fastest lap in the session with a lap of 01:06.228 and a speed of 122.739 mph (197.527 km/h)

Top Practice Speeds
| Pos | No. | Driver | Team | Engine | Lap Time |
|---|---|---|---|---|---|
| 1 | 60 | (Sweden) Felix Rosenqvist | Meyer Shank Racing | Honda | 01:06.228 |
| 2 | 66 | (New Zealand) Marcus Armstrong | Meyer Shank Racing | Honda | 01:06.541 |
| 3 | 10 | (Spain) Álex Palou W | Chip Ganassi Racing | Honda | 01:06.566 |
Warmup results

== Race ==
The race was held at 1:00 PM ET on July 6, 2025.

=== Race classification ===
| Pos | No. | Driver | Team | Engine | Laps | Laps Led | Pit Stops | Time/Retired | Grid | Pts. |
|---|---|---|---|---|---|---|---|---|---|---|
| 1 | 9 | (New Zealand) Scott Dixon W | Chip Ganassi Racing | Honda | 90 | 11 | 2 | 01:49:41.0967 | 9 | 51 |
| 2 | 10 | (Spain) Álex Palou W | Chip Ganassi Racing | Honda | 90 | 75 | 3 | +0.4201 | 1 | 44 |
| 3 | 7 | (Denmark) Christian Lundgaard | Arrow McLaren | Chevrolet | 90 | 0 | 3 | +2.1222 | 2 | 35 |
| 4 | 26 | (United States) Colton Herta W | Andretti Global with Curb-Agajanian | Honda | 90 | 3 | 3 | +7.2620 | 5 | 33 |
| 5 | 5 | (Mexico) Pato O'Ward W | Arrow McLaren | Chevrolet | 90 | 0 | 3 | +10.3286 | 14 | 30 |
| 6 | 60 | (Sweden) Felix Rosenqvist | Meyer Shank Racing | Honda | 90 | 0 | 2 | +27.6686 | 15 | 28 |
| 7 | 66 | (New Zealand) Marcus Armstrong | Meyer Shank Racing | Honda | 90 | 0 | 3 | +28.8640 | 8 | 26 |
| 8 | 27 | (United States) Kyle Kirkwood | Andretti Global | Honda | 90 | 0 | 3 | +31.8748 | 7 | 24 |
| 9 | 18 | (Netherlands) Rinus VeeKay | Dale Coyne Racing | Honda | 90 | 0 | 2 | +33.9777 | 26 | 22 |
| 10 | 8 | (Cayman Islands) Kyffin Simpson | Chip Ganassi Racing | Honda | 90 | 1 | 2 | +34.9879 | 3 | 21 |
| 11 | 6 | (United States) Nolan Siegel R | Arrow McLaren | Chevrolet | 90 | 0 | 3 | +35.3276 | 4 | 19 |
| 12 | 28 | (Sweden) Marcus Ericsson | Andretti Global | Honda | 90 | 0 | 3 | +38.3348 | 10 | 18 |
| 13 | 90 | (United Kingdom) Callum Ilott | Prema Racing | Chevrolet | 90 | 0 | 4 | +39.8048 | 24 | 17 |
| 14 | 45 | (United Kingdom) Louis Foster R | Rahal Letterman Lanigan Racing | Honda | 90 | 0 | 3 | +40.2151 | 6 | 16 |
| 15 | 20 | (United States) Alexander Rossi W | ECR | Chevrolet | 90 | 0 | 3 | +43.7343 | 11 | 15 |
| 16 | 14 | (United States) Santino Ferrucci | A. J. Foyt Racing | Chevrolet | 90 | 0 | 3 | +45.8651 | 17 | 14 |
| 17 | 4 | (United States) David Malukas | A. J. Foyt Racing | Chevrolet | 90 | 0 | 3 | +47.9888 | 13 | 13 |
| 18 | 77 | (United States) Sting Ray Robb | Juncos Hollinger Racing | Chevrolet | 90 | 0 | 3 | +48.7960 | 19 | 12 |
| 19 | 76 | (United States) Conor Daly | Juncos Hollinger Racing | Chevrolet | 90 | 0 | 3 | +57.3140 | 12 | 11 |
| 20 | 30 | (Canada) Devlin DeFrancesco | Rahal Letterman Lanigan Racing | Honda | 90 | 0 | 5 | +57.6819 | 23 | 10 |
| 21 | 83 | (Israel) Robert Shwartzman R | Prema Racing | Chevrolet | 90 | 0 | 3 | +58.8091 | 27 | 9 |
| 22 | 51 | (United States) Jacob Abel R | Dale Coyne Racing | Honda | 90 | 0 | 3 | +59.3303 | 25 | 8 |
| 23 | 3 | (New Zealand) Scott McLaughlin W | Team Penske | Chevrolet | 89 | 0 | 5 | -1 Lap | 21 | 7 |
| 24 | 15 | (United States) Graham Rahal W | Rahal Letterman Lanigan Racing | Honda | 89 | 0 | 4 | -1 Lap | 20 | 6 |
| 25 | 21 | (Denmark) Christian Rasmussen | ECR | Chevrolet | 36 | 0 | 3 | Retired | 16 | 5 |
| 26 | 12 | (Australia) Will Power W | Team Penske | Chevrolet | 11 | 0 | 2 | Mechanical | 22 | 5 |
| 27 | 2 | (United States) Josef Newgarden W | Team Penske | Chevrolet | 1 | 0 | 0 | Contact | 18 | 5 |
Fastest lap: (New Zealand) Scott McLaughlin — 1:06.5919 (lap 83)
Official results

== Championship standings after the race ==
Drivers' Championship standings

| | Pos. | Driver | Points |
|---|---|---|---|
| Unchanged | 1 | (Spain) Álex Palou | 430 |
| Unchanged | 2 | (United States) Kyle Kirkwood | 317 (–113) |
| Unchanged | 3 | (Mexico) Pato O'Ward | 305 (–125) |
| Unchanged | 4 | (New Zealand) Scott Dixon | 282 (–148) |
| 1 | 5 | (Denmark) Christian Lundgaard | 263 (–167) |

Engine manufacturer standings

| | Pos. | Manufacturer | Points |
|---|---|---|---|
| Unchanged | 1 | Honda | 915 |
| Unchanged | 2 | Chevrolet | 701 (–214) |

- Note: Only the top five positions are included.

| Previous race: 2025 XPEL Grand Prix at Road America | NTT IndyCar Series; 2025 season | Next race: 2025 Sukup IndyCar Race Weekend |
| Previous race: 2024 Honda Indy 200 | Indy 200 at Mid-Ohio | Next race: 2026 Honda Indy 200 |
