= 2012 USAC Traxxas Silver Crown Series =

The 2012 USAC Traxxas Silver Crown Champ Car Series season was the 41st season of the USAC Silver Crown Series. The series began with the Hall of Fame Classic at Indianapolis Raceway Park on May 19, and ended on October 13 at the Sumar Classic at the Terre Haute Action Track. Levi Jones began the season as the defending champion, and Bobby East was the season champion.

== Schedule/Results ==
No.	Date	Race title	Track	Winning driver
1	May 19	Hall of Fame Classic	Lucas Oil Raceway at Indianapolis, Clermont, Indiana	Bobby Santos III
2	May 25	Hoosier Hundred	Indiana State Fairgrounds, Indianapolis, Indiana	Jerry Coons Jr.
3	June 22	Casey's General Store USAC Challenge	Iowa Speedway, Newton, Iowa	Bobby East
4	June 29	Rollie Beale 150	Toledo Speedway, Toledo, Ohio	Jerry Coons Jr.
5	July 27	JD Byrider Rich Vogler Classic 100	Lucas Oil Raceway at Indianapolis, Clermont, Indiana	Bobby Santos III
6	August 18	Bettenhausen 100	Illinois State Fairgrounds Racetrack, Springfield, Illinois	AJ Fike
7	September 2	Ted Horn Memorial 100	DuQuoin State Fairgrounds Racetrack, DuQuoin, Illinois	Rained out
8	September 22	Four Crown Nationals	Eldora Speedway, Rossburg, Ohio	Bryan Clauson
9	October 13	Sumar Classic	Terre Haute Action Track, Terre Haute, Indiana	Bobby East

Dirt oval
Pavement oval
