= 2019 Firestone Grand Prix of Monterey =

Indycar race held in Monterey, California

(United States) 2019 Firestone Grand Prix of Monterey
Race details
17th round of the 2019 IndyCar season
← Previous race
- Layout of the WeatherTech Raceway Laguna Seca
- Date: September 22, 2019
- Official name: Firestone Grand Prix of Monterey
- Location: WeatherTech Raceway Laguna Seca, Monterey, California
- Course: Permanent road course 2.238 mi / 3.602 km
- Distance: 90 laps 201.42 mi / 324.18 km

Pole position
- Driver: (United States) Colton Herta (Harding Steinbrenner Racing)
- Time: 01:10.1405

Fastest lap
- Driver: (New Zealand) Scott Dixon (Chip Ganassi Racing)
- Time: 01:12.2310 (on lap 5 of 90)

Podium
- First: (United States) Colton Herta (Harding Steinbrenner Racing)
- Second: (Australia) Will Power (Team Penske)
- Third: (New Zealand) Scott Dixon (Chip Ganassi Racing)

The 2019 Firestone Grand Prix of Monterey was the seventeenth and final round of the 2019 IndyCar season. The race was held on September 22, 2019, in Monterey, California at the WeatherTech Raceway Laguna Seca, and marked the return of open-wheel racing to the track for the first time since Champ Car's 2004 race. The race consisted of 90 laps & was won by rookie Colton Herta.

At the end of the race, Josef Newgarden won his second IndyCar championship in three years, while Felix Rosenqvist narrowly won rookie of the year honors, fending off Colton Herta.

== Entry list ==
Key	Meaning
R	Rookie
W	Past winner

No.	Driver	Team	Engine
2	(United States) Josef Newgarden	Team Penske	Chevrolet
4	(Brazil) Matheus Leist	A. J. Foyt Enterprises	Chevrolet
5	(Canada) James Hinchcliffe	Arrow Schmidt Peterson Motorsports	Honda
7	(Sweden) Marcus Ericsson R	Arrow Schmidt Peterson Motorsports	Honda
9	(New Zealand) Scott Dixon	Chip Ganassi Racing	Honda
10	(Sweden) Felix Rosenqvist R	Chip Ganassi Racing	Honda
12	(Australia) Will Power	Team Penske	Chevrolet
14	(Brazil) Tony Kanaan	A. J. Foyt Enterprises	Chevrolet
15	(United States) Graham Rahal	Rahal Letterman Lanigan Racing	Honda
18	(France) Sébastien Bourdais	Dale Coyne Racing with Vasser Sullivan	Honda
19	(United States) Santino Ferrucci R	Dale Coyne Racing	Honda
20	(United Arab Emirates) Ed Jones	Ed Carpenter Racing Scuderia Corsa	Chevrolet
21	(United States) Spencer Pigot	Ed Carpenter Racing	Chevrolet
22	(France) Simon Pagenaud	Team Penske	Chevrolet
23	(United States) Charlie Kimball	Carlin	Chevrolet
25	(United States) Conor Daly	Andretti Autosport	Honda
26	(United States) Zach Veach	Andretti Autosport	Honda
27	(United States) Alexander Rossi	Andretti Autosport	Honda
28	(United States) Ryan Hunter-Reay	Andretti Autosport	Honda
30	(Japan) Takuma Sato	Rahal Letterman Lanigan Racing	Honda
59	(United Kingdom) Max Chilton	Carlin	Chevrolet
60	(United Kingdom) Jack Harvey	Meyer Shank Racing with Arrow Schmidt Peterson	Honda
88	(United States) Colton Herta R	Harding Steinbrenner Racing	Honda
98	(United States) Marco Andretti	Andretti Herta Autosport w/ Marco Andretti & Curb-Agajanian	Honda

== Practice ==
=== Practice 1 ===
Top Practice Speeds
Pos	No.	Driver	Team	Engine	Lap Time
1	88	(United States) Colton Herta R	Harding Steinbrenner Racing	Honda	01:10.7335
2	10	(Sweden) Felix Rosenqvist R	Chip Ganassi Racing	Honda	01:10.8054
3	19	(United States) Santino Ferrucci R	Dale Coyne Racing	Honda	01:10.8837

=== Practice 2 ===
Top Practice Speeds
Pos	No.	Driver	Team	Engine	Lap Time
1	28	(United States) Ryan Hunter-Reay	Andretti Autosport	Honda	01:09.9105
2	10	(Sweden) Felix Rosenqvist R	Chip Ganassi Racing	Honda	01:09.9305
3	88	(United States) Colton Herta R	Harding Steinbrenner Racing	Honda	01:09.9317

== Qualifying ==
Qualifying started at 4:35 PM ET on September 21, 2019.

=== Qualifying classification ===
Pos	No.	Driver	Team	Engine	Time				Final grid
Pos	No.	Driver	Team	Engine	Round 1		Round 2	Round 3	Final grid
Pos	No.	Driver	Team	Engine	Group 1	Group 2	Round 2	Round 3	Final grid
1	88	(United States) Colton Herta **R**	Harding Steinbrenner Racing	Honda	N/A	**01:10.2892**	**01:09.9828**	**01:10.1405**	1
2	9	(New Zealand) Scott Dixon	Chip Ganassi Racing	Honda	01:10.3256	N/A	01:10.0845	01:10.1831	2
3	27	(United States) Alexander Rossi	Andretti Autosport	Honda	01:10.3097	N/A	01:10.2332	01:10.2105	3
4	2	(United States) Josef Newgarden	Team Penske	Chevrolet	**01:10.3081**	N/A	01:10.2674	01:10.6719	4
5	5	(Canada) James Hinchcliffe	Arrow Schmidt Peterson Motorsports	Honda	N/A	01:10.6462	01:10.4387	01:10.8003	5
6	22	(France) Simon Pagenaud	Team Penske	Chevrolet	01:10.4809	N/A	01:10.6031	01:10.8616	6
7	12	(Australia) Will Power	Team Penske	Chevrolet	N/A	01:10.4489	01:10.6086	N/A	7
8	15	(United States) Graham Rahal	Rahal Letterman Lanigan Racing	Honda	N/A	01:10.7920	01:10.6296	N/A	8
9	28	(United States) Ryan Hunter-Reay	Andretti Autosport	Honda	01:10.5860	N/A	01:10.6919	N/A	9
10	59	(United Kingdom) Max Chilton	Carlin	Chevrolet	01:10.5276	N/A	01:10.7257	N/A	10
11	7	(Sweden) Marcus Ericsson **R**	Arrow Schmidt Peterson Motorsports	Honda	N/A	01:10.5296	01:11.1666	N/A	11
12	19	(United States) Santino Ferrucci **R**	Dale Coyne Racing	Honda	N/A	01:10.7253	01:12.4137	N/A	12
13	25	(United States) Conor Daly	Andretti Autosport	Honda	01:10.7787	N/A	N/A	N/A	13
14	10	(Sweden) Felix Rosenqvist **R**	Chip Ganassi Racing	Honda	N/A	01:10.5649 (Note: Although Felix Rosenqvist's listed time should have allowed him into the second round of qualifying, his fasted 2 laps for the session were disallowed.)	N/A	N/A	14
15	21	(United States) Spencer Pigot	Ed Carpenter Racing	Chevrolet	01:10.8275	N/A	N/A	N/A	15
16	30	(Japan) Takuma Sato	Rahal Letterman Lanigan Racing	Honda	N/A	01:10.8393	N/A	N/A	16
17	26	(United States) Zach Veach	Andretti Autosport	Honda	01:10.8407	N/A	N/A	N/A	17
18	20	(United Arab Emirates) Ed Jones	Ed Carpenter Racing Scuderia Corsa	Chevrolet	N/A	01:10.9806	N/A	N/A	18
19	18	(France) Sébastien Bourdais	Dale Coyne Racing with Vasser Sullivan	Honda	01:11.0095	N/A	N/A	N/A	19
20	23	(United States) Charlie Kimball	Carlin	Chevrolet	N/A	01:10.9865	N/A	N/A	20
21	14	(Brazil) Tony Kanaan	A. J. Foyt Enterprises	Chevrolet	01:11.2454	N/A	N/A	N/A	21
22	98	(United States) Marco Andretti	Andretti Herta Autosport w/ Marco Andretti & Curb-Agajanian	Honda	N/A	01:11.0527	N/A	N/A	22
23	4	(Brazil) Matheus Leist	A. J. Foyt Enterprises	Chevrolet	01:11.5180	N/A	N/A	N/A	23
24	60	(United Kingdom) Jack Harvey	Meyer Shank Racing with Arrow Schmidt Peterson	Honda	N/A	01:11.2710	N/A	N/A	24

Notes

- **Bold text** indicates fastest time set in session.

== Warmup ==
Top Practice Speeds
Pos	No.	Driver	Team	Engine	Lap Time
1	27	(United States) Alexander Rossi	Andretti Autosport	Honda	01:10.0988
2	28	(United States) Ryan Hunter-Reay	Andretti Autosport	Honda	01:10.8926
3	88	(United States) Colton Herta R	Harding Steinbrenner Racing	Honda	01:10.8950

== Race ==
The race started at 3:15 PM ET on September 22, 2019.

=== Race classification ===
Pos	No.	Driver	Team	Engine	Laps	Time/Retired	Pit Stops	Grid	Laps Led	Pts.
1	88	(United States) Colton Herta R	Harding Steinbrenner Racing	Honda	90	01:53:56.9845	3	1	83	104
2	12	(Australia) Will Power	Team Penske	Chevrolet	90	+0.5878	3	7	6	81
3	9	(New Zealand) Scott Dixon	Chip Ganassi Racing	Honda	90	+6.2404	3	2		70
4	22	(France) Simon Pagenaud	Team Penske	Chevrolet	90	+6.3545	3	6	1	65
5	10	(Sweden) Felix Rosenqvist R	Chip Ganassi Racing	Honda	90	+9.5206	3	14		60
6	27	(United States) Alexander Rossi	Andretti Autosport	Honda	90	+10.3637	3	3		56
7	18	(France) Sébastien Bourdais	Dale Coyne Racing with Vasser Sullivan	Honda	90	+10.6831	3	19		52
8	2	(United States) Josef Newgarden	Team Penske	Chevrolet	90	+19.0447	3	4		48
9	5	(Canada) James Hinchcliffe	Arrow Schmidt Peterson Motorsports	Honda	90	+22.8186	3	5		44
10	28	(United States) Ryan Hunter-Reay	Andretti Autosport	Honda	90	+24.7944	3	9		40
11	7	(Sweden) Marcus Ericsson R	Arrow Schmidt Peterson Motorsports	Honda	90	+25.7806	3	11		38
12	15	(United States) Graham Rahal	Rahal Letterman Lanigan Racing	Honda	90	+26.6517	3	8		36
13	59	(United Kingdom) Max Chilton	Carlin	Chevrolet	90	+27.0743	3	10		34
14	98	(United States) Marco Andretti	Andretti Herta Autosport w/ Marco Andretti & Curb-Agajanian	Honda	90	+54.4314	3	22		32
15	23	(United States) Charlie Kimball	Carlin	Chevrolet	90	+56.5862	3	20		30
16	14	(Brazil) Tony Kanaan	A. J. Foyt Enterprises	Chevrolet	90	+65.8739	3	21		28
17	4	(Brazil) Matheus Leist	A. J. Foyt Enterprises	Chevrolet	90	+66.5640	3	23		26
18	26	(United States) Zach Veach	Andretti Autosport	Honda	90	+67.9267	3	17		24
19	60	(United Kingdom) Jack Harvey	Meyer Shank Racing with Arrow Schmidt Peterson	Honda	90	+70.7956	5	24		22
20	21	(United States) Spencer Pigot	Ed Carpenter Racing	Chevrolet	89	+1 Lap	3	15		20
21	30	(Japan) Takuma Sato	Rahal Letterman Lanigan Racing	Honda	89	+1 Lap	5	16		18
22	25	(United States) Conor Daly	Andretti Autosport	Honda	89	+1 Lap	4	13		16
23	20	(United Arab Emirates) Ed Jones	Ed Carpenter Racing Scuderia Corsa	Chevrolet	51	Mechanical	4	18		14
24	19	(United States) Santino Ferrucci R	Dale Coyne Racing	Honda	48	Contact	2	12		12
Fastest lap: (New Zealand) Scott Dixon (Chip Ganassi Racing) – 01:12.2310 (lap 5)

== Championship standings after the race ==
Drivers' Championship standings

	Pos.	Driver	Points
Unchanged	1	(United States) Josef Newgarden	641
1	2	(France) Simon Pagenaud	616
1	3	(United States) Alexander Rossi	608
Unchanged	4	(New Zealand) Scott Dixon	578
Unchanged	5	(Australia) Will Power	550

Engine manufacturer standings

	Pos.	Manufacturer	Points
Unchanged	1	Honda	1436
Unchanged	2	Chevrolet	1387

- Note: Only the top five positions are included.

== Footnotes ==
Previous race: 2019 Grand Prix of Portland	IndyCar Series; 2019 season	Next race: 2020 Genesys 300
Previous race: 2004 Bridgestone Grand Prix of Monterey	Firestone Grand Prix of Monterey	Next race: 2021 Firestone Grand Prix of Monterey
