= 2019 Honda Indy Grand Prix of Alabama =

(United States) 2019 Alabama
Race details
3rd round of the 2019 IndyCar season
← Previous race	Next race →
- Date: April 7, 2019
- Official name: Honda Indy Grand Prix of Alabama Presented by AmFirst
- Location: Barber Motorsports Park
- Course: Permanent racing facility 2.380 mi / 3.830 km
- Distance: 90 laps 214.200 mi / 344.700 km

Pole position
- Driver: Takuma Sato (Rahal Letterman Lanigan Racing)
- Time: 1:08.5934

Fastest lap
- Driver: Will Power (Team Penske)
- Time: 1:10.4818 (on lap 12 of 90)

Podium
- First: Takuma Sato (Rahal Letterman Lanigan Racing)
- Second: Scott Dixon (Chip Ganassi Racing)
- Third: Sébastien Bourdais (Dale Coyne Racing with Vasser-Sullivan)

The 2019 Honda Indy Grand Prix of Alabama Presented by AmFirst was the 3rd round of the 2019 IndyCar season. The race was held on April 7, 2019, in Birmingham, Alabama. Takuma Sato won the race from the pole position scoring his fourth career IndyCar victory.

== Results ==
Key	Meaning
R	Rookie
W	Past winner

=== Qualifying ===
Pos	No.	Name	Grp.	Round 1	Round 2	Firestone Fast 6
1	30	(Japan) Takuma Sato	2	1:08.7171	1:08.6234	1:08.5934
2	15	(United States) Graham Rahal	2	1:08.5104	1:08.6996	1:08.6971
3	9	(New Zealand) Scott Dixon	2	1:08.4996	1:08.6123	1:08.8081
4	5	(Canada) James Hinchcliffe	2	1:08.7545	1:08.4074	1:08.8476
5	18	(France) Sébastien Bourdais	1	1:08.5930	1:08.7860	1:09.0189
6	21	(United States) Spencer Pigot	1	1:08.3548	1:08.5951	1:09.6074
7	12	(Australia) Will Power W	2	1:08.5397	1:08.8248	
8	27	(United States) Alexander Rossi	1	1:08.8013	1:08.8866	
9	88	(United States) Colton Herta R	1	1:08.3762	1:08.9130	
10	19	(United States) Santino Ferrucci R	1	1:08.5672	1:09.0213	
11	28	(United States) Ryan Hunter-Reay W	2	1:08.6872	1:09.0764	
12	60	(United Kingdom) Jack Harvey	1	1:08.8605	1:09.2967	
13	98	(United States) Marco Andretti	1	1:08.8950		
14	22	(France) Simon Pagenaud W	2	1:08.7943		
15	4	(Brazil) Matheus Leist	1	1:08.9477		
16	2	(United States) Josef Newgarden W	2	1:08.8700		
17	10	(Sweden) Felix Rosenqvist R	1	1:08.9630		
18	31	(Mexico) Patricio O'Ward R	2	1:08.9011		
19	14	(Brazil) Tony Kanaan	1	1:09.0327		
20	7	(Sweden) Marcus Ericsson R	2	1:08.9226		
21	20	(United Arab Emirates) Ed Jones	1	1:09.0441		
22	59	(United Kingdom) Max Chilton	2	1:09.0566		
23	26	(United States) Zach Veach	1	1:09.4478		
24	81	(United Kingdom) Ben Hanley R	2	1:10.4165		
OFFICIAL BOX SCORE

=== Race ===
Pos	No.	Driver	Team	Engine	Laps	Time/Retired	Pit Stops	Grid	Laps Led	Pts.
1	30	(Japan) Takuma Sato	Rahal Letterman Lanigan Racing	Honda	90	1:55:46.8076	3	1	74	54
2	9	(New Zealand) Scott Dixon	Chip Ganassi Racing	Honda	90	+2.3874	3	3	2	41
3	18	(France) Sébastien Bourdais	Dale Coyne Racing with Vasser-Sullivan	Honda	90	+2.7933	2	5	8	36
4	2	(United States) Josef Newgarden W	Team Penske	Chevrolet	90	+7.9721	3	16		32
5	27	(United States) Alexander Rossi	Andretti Autosport	Honda	90	+8.8518	3	8	3	31
6	5	(Canada) James Hinchcliffe	Arrow Schmidt Peterson Motorsports	Honda	90	+9.4356	3	4	2	29
7	7	(Sweden) Marcus Ericsson R	Arrow Schmidt Peterson Motorsports	Honda	90	+13.7580	3	20		26
8	28	(United States) Ryan Hunter-Reay W	Andretti Autosport	Honda	90	+15.2506	3	11		24
9	22	(France) Simon Pagenaud W	Team Penske	Chevrolet	90	+22.7848	3	14		22
10	10	(Sweden) Felix Rosenqvist R	Chip Ganassi Racing	Honda	90	+26.2450	4	17		20
11	12	(Australia) Will Power W	Team Penske	Chevrolet	90	+31.8178	4	7		19
12	26	(United States) Zach Veach	Andretti Autosport	Honda	90	+33.9035	4	23		18
13	60	(United Kingdom) Jack Harvey	Meyer Shank Racing with Arrow Schmidt Peterson	Honda	90	+34.9655	3	12		17
14	98	(United States) Marco Andretti	Andretti Herta Autosport w/ Marco Andretti & Curb-Agajanian	Honda	90	+39.3119	4	13		16
15	19	(United States) Santino Ferrucci R	Dale Coyne Racing	Honda	90	+40.0094	4	10		15
16	31	(Mexico) Patricio O'Ward R	Carlin Racing	Chevrolet	90	+40.6728	6	18		14
17	21	(United States) Spencer Pigot	Ed Carpenter Racing	Chevrolet	90	+42.5718	3	6		13
18	14	(Brazil) Tony Kanaan	A. J. Foyt Enterprises	Chevrolet	89	+1 Lap	5	19		12
19	20	(United Arab Emirates) Ed Jones	Ed Carpenter Racing Scuderia Corsa	Chevrolet	89	+1 Lap	5	21		11
20	4	(Brazil) Matheus Leist	A. J. Foyt Enterprises	Chevrolet	89	+1 Lap	4	15		10
21	81	(United Kingdom) Ben Hanley R	DragonSpeed	Chevrolet	88	+2 Laps	4	24		9
22	59	(United Kingdom) Max Chilton	Carlin Racing	Chevrolet	88	+2 Laps	5	22		8
23	15	(United States) Graham Rahal	Rahal Letterman Lanigan Racing	Honda	55	Mechanical	2	2	1	8
24	88	(United States) Colton Herta R	Harding Steinbrenner Racing	Honda	51	+39 Laps	2	9		6
OFFICIAL BOX SCORE

Notes: ^{1} Points include 1 point for leading at least 1 lap during a race, an additional 2 points for leading the most race laps, and 1 point for Pole Position.

== Championship standings after the race ==
Drivers' Championship standings

	Pos	Driver	Points
	1	(United States) Josef Newgarden	125
1	2	(New Zealand) Scott Dixon	98
11	3	(Japan) Takuma Sato	91
	4	(United States) Alexander Rossi	84
3	5	(United States) Colton Herta	81

Manufacturer standings

Pos	Manufacturer	Points
1	(Japan) Honda	258
2	(United States) Chevrolet	210

- Note: Only the top five positions are included.

Previous race: 2019 IndyCar Classic	IndyCar Series; 2019 season	Next race: 2019 Acura Grand Prix of Long Beach
Previous race: 2018 Honda Indy Grand Prix of Alabama	Honda Indy Grand Prix of Alabama	Next race: 2021 Honda Indy Grand Prix of Alabama
