= 2019 Grand Prix of Portland =

(United States) 2019 Portland
Race details
16th round of the 2019 IndyCar season
← Previous race	Next race →
- Portland International Raceway Track Layout
- Date: September 1, 2019
- Official name: Grand Prix of Portland
- Location: Portland International Raceway
- Course: Permanent Road Course; 1.964 mi / 3.142 km
- Distance: 105 laps 206.220 mi / 329.952 km
- Weather: Sunny with partly cloudy skies 82 °F (28 °C)

Pole position
- Driver: (United States) Colton Herta (Harding Steinbrenner Racing)
- Time: 57.8111 seconds

Fastest lap
- Driver: (France) Sébastien Bourdais (DCR w/Vasser Sullivan)
- Time: 59.0022 seconds (on lap 41 of 105)

Podium
- First: (Australia) Will Power (Team Penske)
- Second: (Sweden) Felix Rosenqvist (Chip Ganassi Racing)
- Third: (United States) Alexander Rossi (Andretti Autosport)

The 2019 Grand Prix of Portland was the 16th And penultimate round of the 2019 IndyCar Series season. The race was held on September 1 at Portland International Raceway, in Portland, Oregon. Colton Herta started on pole but, the race was won by Will Power with Felix Rosenqvist finishing second and Alexander Rossi third.

== Results ==
=== Race ===
All cars utilized Dallara chassis with the Universal Aero Kit 18, and Firestone Firehawk tires.

Pos.	No.	Driver	Team	Engine	Laps	Time/Retired	Pit stops	Grid	Laps led	Pts.
1	12	(Australia) Will Power	Team Penske	Chevrolet	105	1:58:43 (104.225 mph)	2	2	52	53
2	10	(Sweden) Felix Rosenqvist	Chip Ganassi Racing	Honda	105	+2.7885	2	5	3	41
3	27	(United States) Alexander Rossi	Andretti Autosport	Honda	105	+4.5839	2	7	0	35
4	88	(United States) Colton Herta	Harding Steinbrenner Racing	Honda	105	+5.2280	2	1	36	34
5	2	(United States) Josef Newgarden	Team Penske	Chevrolet	105	+5.8539	2	13	0	30
6	21	(United States) Spencer Pigot	Ed Carpenter Racing	Chevrolet	105	+6.7477	3	10	0	28
7	22	(France) Simon Pagenaud	Team Penske	Chevrolet	105	+7.9418	2	18	0	26
8	4	(Brazil) Matheus Leist	A. J. Foyt Enterprises	Chevrolet	105	+8.1898	4	21	0	24
9	18	(France) Sébastien Bourdais	Dale Coyne Racing with Vasser Sullivan	Honda	105	+9.5957	3	12	3	23
10	23	(United States) Charlie Kimball	Carlin Racing	Chevrolet	105	+10.1665	2	22	0	20
11	59	(United Kingdom) Max Chilton	Carlin Racing	Chevrolet	104	+1 lap	4	20	0	19
12	14	(Brazil) Tony Kanaan	A. J. Foyt Enterprises	Chevrolet	104	+1 lap	4	19	0	18
13	98	(United States) Marco Andretti	Andretti Autosport	Honda	104	+1 lap	5	16	0	17
14	20	(United Arab Emirates) Ed Jones	Ed Carpenter Racing	Chevrolet	104	+1 lap	5	23	0	16
15	30	(Japan) Takuma Sato	Rahal Letterman Lanigan Racing	Honda	103	+2 lap	6	17	0	15
16	9	(New Zealand) Scott Dixon	Chip Ganassi Racing	Honda	102	+3 lap	4	3	11	15
17	19	(United States) Santino Ferrucci	Dale Coyne Racing	Honda	96	Mechanical	4	14	0	13
18	28	(United States) Ryan Hunter-Reay	Andretti Autosport	Honda	81	Contact	4	6	0	12
19	60	(United Kingdom) Jack Harvey	Michael Shank Racing	Honda	13	Contact	0	4	0	11
20	5	(Canada) James Hinchcliffe	Schmidt Peterson Motorsports	Honda	0	Contact	0	8	0	10
21	7	(United States) Conor Daly	Schmidt Peterson Motorsports	Honda	0	Contact	0	9	0	9
22	26	(United States) Zach Veach	Andretti Autosport	Honda	0	Contact	0	11	0	8
23	15	(United States) Graham Rahal	Rahal Letterman Lanigan Racing	Honda	0	Contact	0	15	0	7

Graham Rahal was given a time penalty to where instead of finishing behind car numbers 7, 5, and 26 whom were terminally disabled behind him, he finished behind those cars instead.

Previous race: 2019 Bommarito Automotive Group 500	IndyCar Series; 2019 season	Next race: 2019 Firestone Grand Prix of Monterey
Previous race: 2018 Grand Prix of Portland	Grand Prix of Portland	Next race: 2021 Grand Prix of Portland
