= 2019 Acura Grand Prix of Long Beach =

(United States) 2019 Acura Grand Prix of Long Beach
Race details
4th round of the 2019 IndyCar season
← Previous race	Next race →
- Date: April 14, 2019
- Official name: Acura Grand Prix of Long Beach
- Location: Streets of Long Beach
- Course: Temporary street circuit 1.968 mi / 3.167 km
- Distance: 85 laps 167.28 mi / 269.21 km

Pole position
- Driver: (United States) Alexander Rossi (Andretti Autosport)
- Time: 1:06.4811

Fastest lap
- Driver: (United States) Ryan Hunter-Reay (Andretti Autosport)
- Time: 1:07.6943 (on lap 27 of 85)

Podium
- First: (United States) Alexander Rossi (Andretti Autosport)
- Second: (United States) Josef Newgarden (Team Penske)
- Third: (New Zealand) Scott Dixon (Chip Ganassi Racing)

Chronology
Previous	Next
2018	2021

The 2019 Acura Grand Prix of Long Beach was the fourth round of the 2019 IndyCar season and the 45th annual running of the Acura Grand Prix of Long Beach. The 85 lap race was held on April 14, 2019, in Long Beach Street Circuit. Alexander Rossi dominated the race from the pole position scoring his sixth career IndyCar victory.

== Results ==
Key	Meaning
R	Rookie
W	Past winner

=== Qualifying ===
Pos	No.	Name	Grp.	Round 1	Round 2	Firestone Fast 6
1	27	(United States) Alexander Rossi W	2	1:06.8621	1:06.7644	1:06.4811
2	9	(New Zealand) Scott Dixon W	2	1:07.0080	1:06.6566	1:06.7479
3	12	(Australia) Will Power W	1	1:08.0121	1:06.9620	1:06.8748
4	2	(United States) Josef Newgarden	1	1:07.7836	1:07.0710	1:06.9096
5	22	(France) Simon Pagenaud W	2	1:07.1474	1:06.9328	1:07.1877
6	15	(United States) Graham Rahal	1	1:07.8102	1:07.0414	1:07.3052
7	28	(United States) Ryan Hunter-Reay W	1	1:07.7307	1:07.1520	
8	30	(Japan) Takuma Sato W	1	1:07.7245	1:07.2626	
9	31	(Mexico) Patricio O'Ward R	2	1:07.2620	1:07.2764	
10	88	(United States) Colton Herta R	2	1:07.2201	1:07.7721	
11	98	(United States) Marco Andretti	2	1:07.2040	1:08.3746	
12	10	(Sweden) Felix Rosenqvist R	1	1:08.0811	1:08.4410	
13	19	(United States) Santino Ferrucci R	1	1:08.1008		
14	18	(France) Sébastien Bourdais W	2	1:07.3135		
15	5	(Canada) James Hinchcliffe W	1	1:08.1811		
16	59	(United Kingdom) Max Chilton	2	1:07.4577		
17	20	(United Arab Emirates) Ed Jones	1	1:08.7711		
18	60	(United Kingdom) Jack Harvey	2	1:07.5287		
19	7	(Sweden) Marcus Ericsson R	1	1:08.9516		
20	4	(Brazil) Matheus Leist	2	1:07.7317		
21	14	(Brazil) Tony Kanaan	1	3:22.3800		
22	26	(United States) Zach Veach	2	1:07.7822		
23	21	(United States) Spencer Pigot	2	1:07.8763		
OFFICIAL BOX SCORE

=== Race ===
Pos	No.	Driver	Team	Engine	Laps	Time/Retired	Pit Stops	Grid	Laps Led	Pts.
1	27	(United States) Alexander Rossi W	Andretti Autosport	Honda	85	1:41:35.5999	2	1	80	54
2	2	(United States) Josef Newgarden	Team Penske	Chevrolet	85	+20.2359	2	4	2	41
3	9	(New Zealand) Scott Dixon W	Chip Ganassi Racing	Honda	85	+25.5745	2	2		35
4	15	(United States) Graham Rahal	Rahal Letterman Lanigan Racing	Honda	85	+26.4589	2	6		32
5	28	(United States) Ryan Hunter-Reay W	Andretti Autosport	Honda	85	+29.3447	2	7		30
6	22	(France) Simon Pagenaud W	Team Penske	Chevrolet	85	+31.5193	2	5		28
7	12	(Australia) Will Power W	Team Penske	Chevrolet	85	+33.0529	2	3	2	27
8	30	(Japan) Takuma Sato W	Rahal Letterman Lanigan Racing	Honda	85	+34.2879	2	8	1	25
9	5	(Canada) James Hinchcliffe W	Arrow Schmidt Peterson Motorsports	Honda	85	+40.4643	2	15		22
10	10	(Sweden) Felix Rosenqvist R	Chip Ganassi Racing	Honda	85	+41.3241	2	12		20
11	18	(France) Sébastien Bourdais W	Dale Coyne Racing with Vasser-Sullivan	Honda	85	+49.9110	2	14		19
12	31	(Mexico) Patricio O'Ward R	Carlin Racing	Chevrolet	84	+1 Lap	2	9		18
13	98	(United States) Marco Andretti	Andretti Herta Autosport w/ Marco Andretti & Curb-Agajanian	Honda	84	+1 Lap	2	11		17
14	59	(United Kingdom) Max Chilton	Carlin Racing	Chevrolet	84	+1 Lap	2	16		16
15	4	(Brazil) Matheus Leist	A. J. Foyt Enterprises	Chevrolet	84	+1 Lap	3	20		15
16	20	(United Arab Emirates) Ed Jones	Ed Carpenter Racing Scuderia Corsa	Chevrolet	84	+1 Lap	3	17		14
17	26	(United States) Zach Veach	Andretti Autosport	Honda	84	+1 Lap	3	22		13
18	21	(United States) Spencer Pigot	Ed Carpenter Racing	Chevrolet	84	+1 Lap	3	23		12
19	14	(Brazil) Tony Kanaan	A. J. Foyt Enterprises	Chevrolet	83	+2 Laps	3	21		11
20	7	(Sweden) Marcus Ericsson R	Arrow Schmidt Peterson Motorsports	Honda	83	+2 Laps	4	19		10
21	19	(United States) Santino Ferrucci R	Dale Coyne Racing	Honda	83	+2 Laps	2	13		9
22	60	(United Kingdom) Jack Harvey	Meyer Shank Racing with Arrow Schmidt Peterson	Honda	82	+3 Laps	4	18		8
23	88	(United States) Colton Herta R	Harding Steinbrenner Racing	Honda	50	Contact	1	10		7
OFFICIAL BOX SCORE

Notes: ^{1} Points include 1 point for leading at least 1 lap during a race, an additional 2 points for leading the most race laps, and 1 point for Pole Position.

== Championship standings after the race ==
Drivers' Championship standings

	Pos	Driver	Points
	1	(United States) Josef Newgarden	166
2	2	(United States) Alexander Rossi	138
1	3	(New Zealand) Scott Dixon	133
1	4	(Japan) Takuma Sato	116
3	5	(United States) Ryan Hunter-Reay	96

Manufacturer standings

Pos	Manufacturer	Points
1	(Japan) Honda	349
2	(United States) Chevrolet	278

- Note: Only the top five positions are included.

Previous race: 2019 Honda Indy Grand Prix of Alabama	IndyCar Series; 2019 season	Next race: 2019 IndyCar Grand Prix
Previous race: 2018 Toyota Grand Prix of Long Beach	Acura Grand Prix of Long Beach	Next race: 2021 Acura Grand Prix of Long Beach
