= 2018 Toyota Grand Prix of Long Beach =

(United States) 2018 Toyota Grand Prix of Long Beach
Race details
3rd round of the 2018 IndyCar Series season
← Previous race	Next race →
- Date: April 15, 2018
- Official name: Toyota Grand Prix of Long Beach
- Location: Streets of Long Beach
- Course: Temporary street circuit 1.968 mi / 3.167 km
- Distance: 85 laps 167.28 mi / 269.21 km

Pole position
- Driver: (United States) Alexander Rossi (Andretti Autosport)
- Time: 1:06.5528

Fastest lap
- Driver: (United States) Josef Newgarden (Team Penske)
- Time: 1:07.5511 (on lap 30 of 85)

Podium
- First: (United States) Alexander Rossi (Andretti Autosport)
- Second: (Australia) Will Power (Team Penske)
- Third: (United Arab Emirates) Ed Jones (Chip Ganassi Racing)

Chronology
Previous	Next
2017	2019

The 2018 Toyota Grand Prix of Long Beach was the third round of the 2018 IndyCar Series and the 44th annual running of the Toyota Grand Prix of Long Beach. The race was contested over 85 laps on a temporary street circuit in Long Beach, California on April 15, 2018. Alexander Rossi won both the pole and the race.

== Report ==
=== Race ===
Rossi maintained the lead position on the start. Will Power, who had qualified alongside Rossi on the front row, also held his position in second. Behind the leaders, Graham Rahal made contact with Simon Pagenaud, forcing the latter into the wall and out of the race. Rossi's lead remained at about 3.5 seconds from lap seven to lap 25, when he made his first pit stop. He would regain the lead after the other drivers made their own stops, holding it for most of the rest of the race. Rossi's victory moved him to the lead in the Drivers' Championship points standings, 23 points ahead of Josef Newgarden, who finished seventh in the race.

== Results ==
Key	Meaning
R	Rookie
W	Past winner

=== Qualifying ===
Pos	No.	Name	Grp.	Round 1	Round 2	Firestone Fast 6
1	27	(United States) Alexander Rossi	2	1:07.1718	1:06.8326	1:06.5528
2	12	(Australia) Will Power W	2	1:07.5874	1:06.5709	1:06.9054
3	22	(France) Simon Pagenaud W	2	1:07.5481	1:06.9057	1:06.9107
4	9	(New Zealand) Scott Dixon W	1	1:07.7897	1:06.8341	1:07.0483
5	15	(United States) Graham Rahal	1	1:08.0364	1:07.0903	1:07.1275
6	1	(United States) Josef Newgarden	1	1:07.8123	1:06.8833	1:07.1922
7	28	(United States) Ryan Hunter-Reay W	1	1:07.7058	1:07.1415	
8	5	(Canada) James Hinchcliffe W	2	1:07.6893	1:07.1899	
9	18	(France) Sébastien Bourdais W	2	1:07.5662	1:07.1943	
10	6	(Canada) Robert Wickens R	1	1:07.9894	1:07.2289	
11	14	(Brazil) Tony Kanaan	2	1:07.8917	1:07.3478	
12	20	(United Kingdom) Jordan King R	1	1:08.2933	1:07.6427	
13	10	(United Arab Emirates) Ed Jones	1	1:08.3844		
14	4	(Brazil) Matheus Leist R	2	1:08.1622		
15	59	(United Kingdom) Max Chilton	1	1:08.7167		
16	26	(United States) Zach Veach R	2	1:08.1763		
17	60	(United Kingdom) Jack Harvey R	1	1:08.8207		
18	21	(United States) Spencer Pigot	2	1:08.2739		
19	88	(Colombia) Gabby Chaves	1	1:08.8623		
20	98	(United States) Marco Andretti	2	1:08.5294		
21	19	(Canada) Zachary Claman DeMelo R	1	1:09.1429		
22	30	(Japan) Takuma Sato W	2	1:08.6340		
23	23	(United States) Charlie Kimball	1	1:09.7481		
24	32	(United States) Kyle Kaiser R	2	No time		
OFFICIAL BOX SCORE

=== Race ===
Pos	No.	Driver	Team	Engine	Laps	Time/Retired	Pit Stops	Grid	Laps Led	Pts.^{1}
1	27	(United States) Alexander Rossi	Andretti Autosport	Honda	85	1:53:15.2434	2	1	71	54
2	12	(Australia) Will Power W	Team Penske	Chevrolet	85	+1.2413	2	2	6	41
3	10	(United Arab Emirates) Ed Jones	Chip Ganassi Racing	Honda	85	+9.2906	3	13		35
4	26	(United States) Zach Veach R	Andretti Autosport	Honda	85	+10.1050	2	16		32
5	15	(United States) Graham Rahal	Rahal Letterman Lanigan Racing	Honda	85	+10.7466	5	5		30
6	98	(United States) Marco Andretti	Andretti Herta Autosport with Curb-Agajanian	Honda	85	+11.5513	2	20		28
7	1	(United States) Josef Newgarden	Team Penske	Chevrolet	85	+12.2175	3	6	3	27
8	14	(Brazil) Tony Kanaan	A. J. Foyt Enterprises	Chevrolet	85	+16.1048	3	11		24
9	5	(Canada) James Hinchcliffe W	Schmidt Peterson Motorsports	Honda	85	+16.4757	3	8		22
10	23	(United States) Charlie Kimball	Carlin	Chevrolet	85	+17.0119	4	23		20
11	9	(New Zealand) Scott Dixon W	Chip Ganassi Racing	Honda	85	+17.3301	3	4		19
12	60	(United Kingdom) Jack Harvey R	Meyer Shank Racing with Schmidt Peterson	Honda	85	+18.3469	3	17		18
13	18	(France) Sébastien Bourdais W	Dale Coyne Racing with Vasser-Sullivan	Honda	85	+18.9443	4	9	4	18
14	4	(Brazil) Matheus Leist R	A. J. Foyt Enterprises	Chevrolet	85	+18.9466	3	14		16
15	21	(United States) Spencer Pigot	Ed Carpenter Racing	Chevrolet	84	+1 Lap	3	18		15
16	32	(United States) Kyle Kaiser R	Juncos Racing	Chevrolet	84	+1 Lap	6	24		14
17	59	(United Kingdom) Max Chilton	Carlin	Chevrolet	84	+1 Lap	5	15		13
18	20	(United Kingdom) Jordan King R	Ed Carpenter Racing	Chevrolet	84	+1 Lap	5	12		12
19	88	(Colombia) Gabby Chaves	Harding Racing	Chevrolet	83	+2 Laps	6	19		11
20	28	(United States) Ryan Hunter-Reay W	Andretti Autosport	Honda	81	+4 Laps	5	7	1	11
21	30	(Japan) Takuma Sato W	Rahal Letterman Lanigan Racing	Honda	74	+11 Laps	5	22		9
22	6	(Canada) Robert Wickens R	Schmidt Peterson Motorsports	Honda	73	+12 Laps	7	10		8
23	19	(Canada) Zachary Claman DeMelo R	Dale Coyne Racing	Honda	27	Contact	3	21		7
24	22	(France) Simon Pagenaud W	Team Penske	Chevrolet	0	Contact	0	3		6
OFFICIAL BOX SCORE

Notes: ^{1} Points include 1 point for leading at least 1 lap during a race, an additional 2 points for leading the most race laps, and 1 point for Pole Position.

== Championship standings after the race ==
Drivers' Championship standings

	Pos	Driver	Points
1	1	(United States) Alexander Rossi	126
1	2	(United States) Josef Newgarden	104
1	3	(United States) Graham Rahal	93
1	4	(France) Sébastien Bourdais	88
	5	(Canada) James Hinchcliffe	83

Manufacturer standings

Pos	Manufacturer	Points
1	(Japan) Honda	263
2	(United States) Chevrolet	193

- Note: Only the top five positions are included.

Previous race: 2018 Desert Diamond West Valley Phoenix Grand Prix	IndyCar Series; 2018 season	Next race: 2018 Honda Indy Grand Prix of Alabama
Previous race: 2017 Toyota Grand Prix of Long Beach	Toyota Grand Prix of Long Beach	Next race: 2019 Acura Grand Prix of Long Beach
