= 2019 IndyCar Classic =

(United States) 2019 Austin
Race details
2nd round of the 2019 IndyCar season
← Previous race	Next race →
- Date: March 24, 2019
- Official name: IndyCar Classic
- Location: Circuit of the Americas
- Course: Permanent racing facility 3.410 mi / 5.488 km
- Distance: 60 laps 204.600 mi / 329.272 km

Pole position
- Driver: Will Power (Team Penske)
- Time: 1:46.0177

Fastest lap
- Driver: Colton Herta (Harding Steinbrenner Racing)
- Time: 1:48.8953 (on lap 54 of 60)

Podium
- First: Colton Herta (Harding Steinbrenner Racing)
- Second: Josef Newgarden (Team Penske)
- Third: Ryan Hunter-Reay (Andretti Autosport)

The 2019 IndyCar Classic was the 2nd round of the 2019 IndyCar season. The race was held on March 24, 2019, in Austin, Texas. Will Power qualified on pole position, while rookie Colton Herta took his first career victory becoming the youngest IndyCar race winner of all time.

== Results ==
Key	Meaning
R	Rookie
W	Past winner

=== Qualifying ===
Pos	No.	Name	Grp.	Round 1	Round 2	Firestone Fast 6
1	12	(Australia) Will Power	2	1:46.4360	1:46.0221	1:46.0177
2	27	(United States) Alexander Rossi	2	1:47.4689	1:45.9263	1:46.1761
3	28	(United States) Ryan Hunter-Reay	1	1:46.5890	1:46.0057	1:46.3228
4	88	(United States) Colton Herta R	1	1:46.7559	1:45.9665	1:46.3594
5	10	(Sweden) Felix Rosenqvist R	1	1:46.2744	1:45.4542	1:46.5680
6	9	(New Zealand) Scott Dixon	1	1:46.2076	1:46.3075	1:46.9375
7	2	(United States) Josef Newgarden	2	1:46.2993	1:46.3438	
8	31	(Mexico) Patricio O'Ward R	1	1:46.8246	1:46.3807	
9	26	(United States) Zach Veach	2	1:46.5227	1:46.5421	
10	15	(United States) Graham Rahal	2	1:46.5180	1:46.9676	
11	19	(United States) Santino Ferrucci R	1	1:46.6126	1:47.3956	
12	4	(Brazil) Matheus Leist	2	1:47.4313	1:48.0634	
13	59	(United Kingdom) Max Chilton	1	1:46.8253		
14	30	(Japan) Takuma Sato	2	1:47.7109		
15	5	(Canada) James Hinchcliffe	1	1:46.8670		
16	7	(Sweden) Marcus Ericsson R	2	1:48.4259		
17	18	(France) Sébastien Bourdais	1	1:47.0702		
18	20	(United Arab Emirates) Ed Jones	2	1:48.4523		
19	21	(United States) Spencer Pigot	1	1:48.4895		
20	98	(United States) Marco Andretti	2	1:48.6521		
21	32	(United States) Kyle Kaiser R	1	1:48.6343		
22	22	(France) Simon Pagenaud	2	1:48.9030		
23	60	(United Kingdom) Jack Harvey	1	1:49.1795		
24	14	(Brazil) Tony Kanaan	2	1:50.0743		

=== Race ===
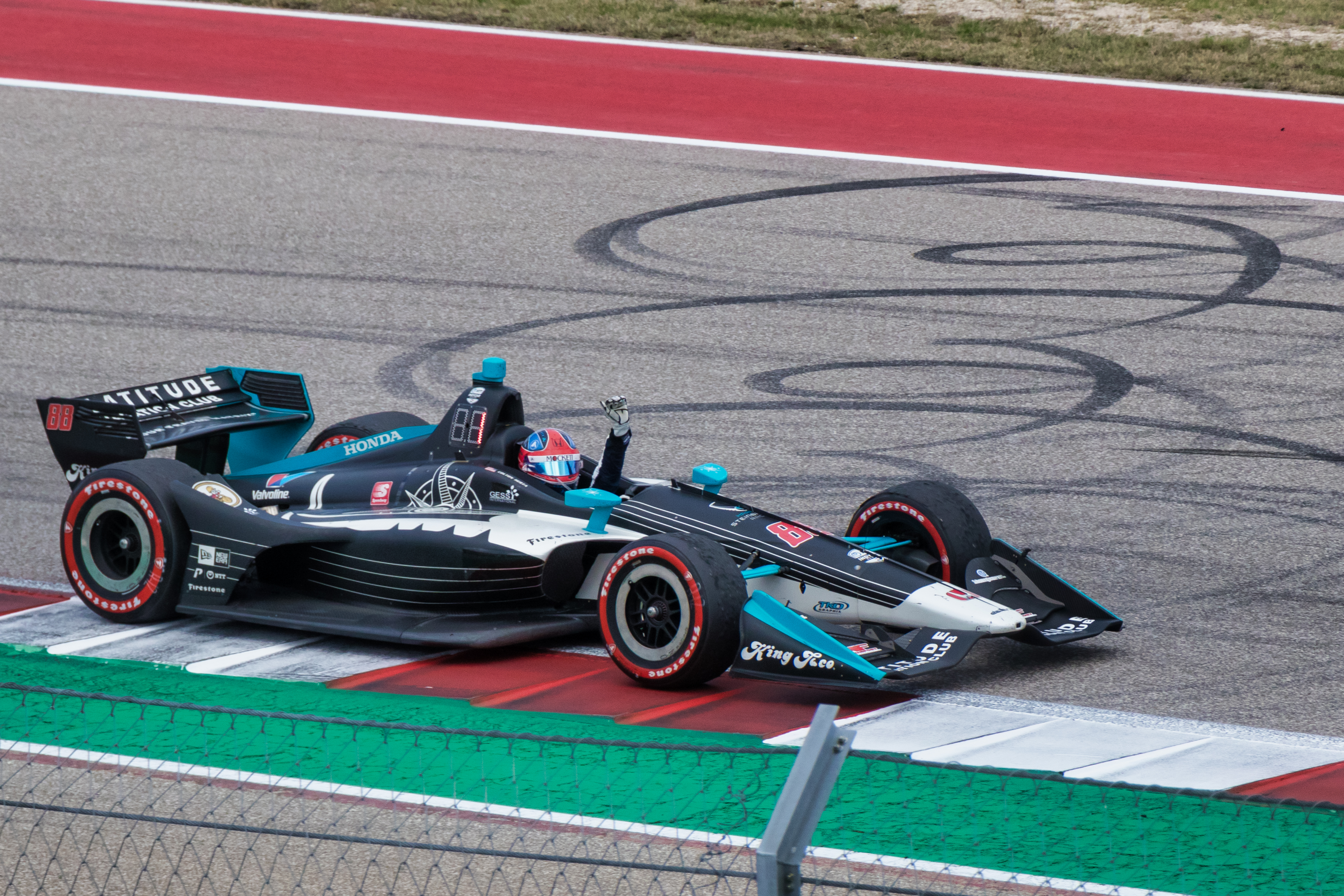
Colton Herta wins at Texas

Pos	No.	Driver	Team	Engine	Laps	Time/Retired	Pit Stops	Grid	Laps Led	Pts.
1	88	(United States) Colton Herta R	Harding Steinbrenner Racing	Honda	60	2:00:02.0587	3	4	15	51
2	2	(United States) Josef Newgarden	Team Penske	Chevrolet	60	+2.7182	3	7		40
3	28	(United States) Ryan Hunter-Reay	Andretti Autosport	Honda	60	+3.2311	3	3		35
4	15	(United States) Graham Rahal	Rahal Letterman Lanigan Racing	Honda	60	+8.0612	3	10		32
5	18	(France) Sébastien Bourdais	Dale Coyne Racing with Vasser-Sullivan	Honda	60	+15.4015	3	17		30
6	98	(United States) Marco Andretti	Andretti Herta Autosport w/ Marco Andretti & Curb-Agajanian	Honda	60	+19.8494	3	20		28
7	30	(Japan) Takuma Sato	Rahal Letterman Lanigan Racing	Honda	60	+22.1467	3	14		26
8	31	(Mexico) Patricio O'Ward R	Carlin Racing	Chevrolet	60	+23.2628	3	8		24
9	27	(United States) Alexander Rossi	Andretti Autosport	Honda	60	+23.5279	3	2		22
10	60	(United Kingdom) Jack Harvey	Meyer Shank Racing with Arrow Schmidt Peterson	Honda	60	+23.9532	3	23		20
11	21	(United States) Spencer Pigot	Ed Carpenter Racing	Chevrolet	60	+24.3838	3	19		19
12	14	(Brazil) Tony Kanaan	A. J. Foyt Enterprises	Chevrolet	60	+27.0568	3	24		18
13	9	(New Zealand) Scott Dixon	Chip Ganassi Racing	Honda	60	+31.0677	3	6		17
14	20	(United Arab Emirates) Ed Jones	Ed Carpenter Racing Scuderia Corsa	Chevrolet	60	+35.6602	3	18		16
15	7	(Sweden) Marcus Ericsson R	Arrow Schmidt Peterson Motorsports	Honda	60	+36.2308	3	16		15
16	5	(Canada) James Hinchcliffe	Arrow Schmidt Peterson Motorsports	Honda	60	+36.7699	4	15		14
17	4	(Brazil) Matheus Leist	A. J. Foyt Enterprises	Chevrolet	60	+39.2619	5	12		13
18	32	(United States) Kyle Kaiser R	Juncos Racing	Chevrolet	60	+46.2357	3	21		12
19	22	(France) Simon Pagenaud	Team Penske	Chevrolet	60	+55.0378	5	22		11
20	19	(United States) Santino Ferrucci R	Dale Coyne Racing	Honda	60	+1:53.6876	6	11		10
21	59	(United Kingdom) Max Chilton	Carlin Racing	Chevrolet	59	+1 Lap	4	13		9
22	26	(United States) Zach Veach	Andretti Autosport	Honda	58	+2 Laps	5	9		8
23	10	(Sweden) Felix Rosenqvist R	Chip Ganassi Racing	Honda	55	+5 Laps	4	5		7
24	12	(Australia) Will Power	Team Penske	Chevrolet	46	Mechanical	2	1	45	10

Notes: ^{1} Points include 1 point for leading at least 1 lap during a race, an additional 2 points for leading the most race laps, and 1 point for Pole Position.

== Championship standings after the race ==
Drivers' Championship standings

	Pos	Driver	Points
	1	(United States) Josef Newgarden	93
6	2	(United States) Colton Herta	75
1	3	(New Zealand) Scott Dixon	57
1	4	(United States) Alexander Rossi	53
7	5	(United States) Graham Rahal	50

Manufacturer standings

Pos	Manufacturer	Points
1	(Japan) Honda	162
2	(United States) Chevrolet	156

- Note: Only the top five positions are included.

Previous race: 2019 Firestone Grand Prix of St. Petersburg	IndyCar Series; 2019 season	Next race: 2019 Honda Indy Grand Prix of Alabama
Previous race: None	IndyCar Classic	Next race: 2020 Auto Nation IndyCar Callenge (Canceled Due Covid-19)
