= 2019 IndyCar Series =

American auto racing season

2019 IndyCar season
- NTT IndyCar Series

Season
- Races: 17
- Start date: March 10
- End date: September 22

Awards
- Drivers' champion: (United States) Josef Newgarden
- Manufacturers' Cup: (Japan) Honda
- Rookie of the Year: (Sweden) Felix Rosenqvist
- Indianapolis 500 winner: (France) Simon Pagenaud

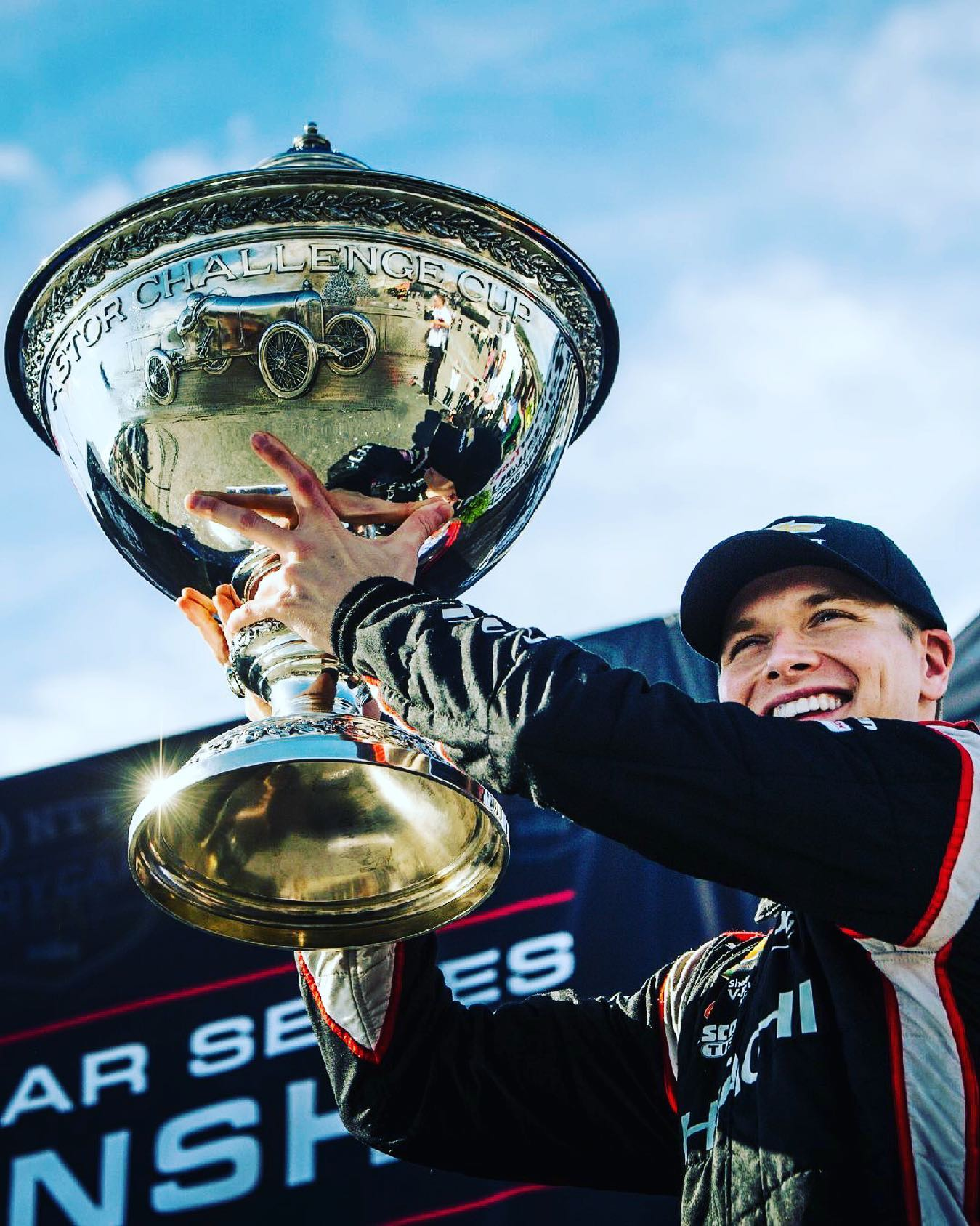
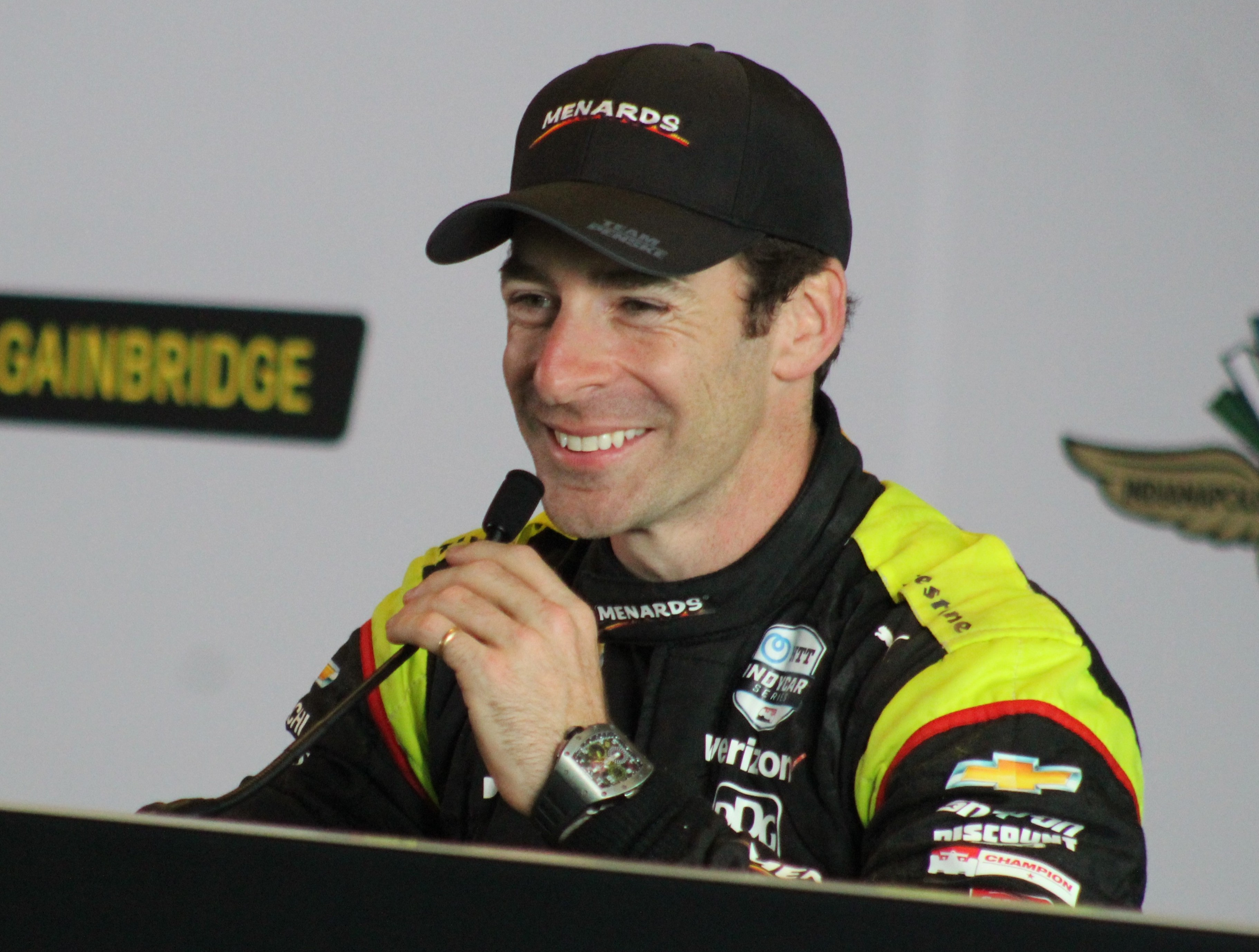
Josef Newgarden (left) won his second Driver's Championship while Simon Pagenaud (right) finished second in the championship.

The 2019 NTT IndyCar Series was the 24th season of the IndyCar Series and the 108th official championship season of American open-wheel racing. The premier event was the 2019 Indianapolis 500, with Will Power entering as the defending winner. Honda entered as the defending Manufacturers' Cup champion. Scott Dixon entered the season as the defending National Champion.

Josef Newgarden won his second Drivers' Championship, while Honda won the Manufacturers' Championship for the second year in a row, and it was the manufacturer's first championship of the Reiwa era. Rookie of the Year honors went to Felix Rosenqvist.

== Series news ==
- On March 21, 2018, NBC Sports announced that it would become the sole United States television rights holder under a new three-year contract, replacing the previous split between ABC and NBC Sports' cable network NBCSN (whose involvement in the series dated back to its tenure as Versus, prior to Comcast's acquisition of NBC). Eight races per-season will air on NBC, including the Indianapolis 500 (ending a run of 54 consecutive editions aired by ABC), and supplemental digital content is offered through NBC Sports' subscription product NBC Sports Gold. As with the previous contracts, the majority of races air on NBCSN.
- On November 5, 2018, IndyCar announced that it had formed a new division known as IndyCar Media to manage the series' international media rights (replacing ESPN International).
- On November 27, 2018, IndyCar announced that Speedway had signed a multi-year sponsorship agreement to be the official fuel provider of IndyCar beginning in 2019, replacing Sunoco after nine years as a fuel provider as the company elected to concentrating on NASCAR and NHRA fuel partnerships.
- All entrants will use 2018-specification engines through the 2020 season as the series concentrates on developing the new 2021 engines.
- On December 17, 2018, it was announced that Jay Frye had been promoted to president of IndyCar.
- On January 15, 2019, IndyCar announced NTT as the new series title sponsor on a multi-year deal, along with becoming the official technology partner of the series and Indianapolis 500. Verizon Communications had previously ended its title sponsorship of the series after the 2018 season.
- On February 6, 2019, it was announced that Firestone Tire and Rubber Company had signed an extension to remain as the series' sole tire supplier through the 2025 season.

== Confirmed entries ==
The following teams, entries, and drivers have been announced to compete in the 2019 NTT IndyCar Series season. All teams will use a spec Dallara DW12 chassis with UAK18 aero kit and Firestone tires.

Team	Engine	No.	Driver(s)	Round(s)
A. J. Foyt Enterprises	Chevrolet	4	(Brazil) Matheus Leist	All
A. J. Foyt Enterprises	Chevrolet	14	(Brazil) Tony Kanaan	All
Andretti Autosport	Honda	25	(United States) Conor Daly	6, 17
Andretti Autosport	Honda	26	(United States) Zach Veach	All
Andretti Autosport	Honda	27	(United States) Alexander Rossi	All
Andretti Autosport	Honda	28	(United States) Ryan Hunter-Reay	All
Andretti Herta Autosport w/ Marco Andretti & Curb-Agajanian	Honda	98	(United States) Marco Andretti	All
Arrow Schmidt Peterson Motorsports	Honda	5	(Canada) James Hinchcliffe	All
Arrow Schmidt Peterson Motorsports	Honda	7	(Sweden) Marcus Ericsson R	1–15, 17
Arrow Schmidt Peterson Motorsports	Honda	7	(United States) Conor Daly	16
MotoGator Team Stange Racing with Arrow Schmidt Peterson	Honda	77	(Spain) Oriol Servià	6
Carlin	Chevrolet	23	(United States) Charlie Kimball	1, 6, 9, 14–17
Carlin	Chevrolet	31	(Mexico) Patricio O'Ward R	2–8, 10
Carlin	Chevrolet	31	(United States) Sage Karam	11–12
Carlin	Chevrolet	31	(United States) R. C. Enerson R	13
Carlin	Chevrolet	59	(United Kingdom) Max Chilton	1–8, 10–11, 13, 16–17
Carlin	Chevrolet	59	(United States) Conor Daly	9, 12, 14–15
Chip Ganassi Racing	Honda	9	(New Zealand) Scott Dixon	All
Chip Ganassi Racing	Honda	10	(Sweden) Felix Rosenqvist R	All
Clauson-Marshall Racing	Chevrolet	39	(United Kingdom) Pippa Mann	6
Dale Coyne Racing	Honda	19	(United States) Santino Ferrucci R	All
Dale Coyne Racing with Byrd/Hollinger/Belardi	Honda	33	(Australia) James Davison R (Note: James Davison is considered a rookie in the IndyCar Series; however, he was not a rookie in the 2019 Indianapolis 500 as he participated in the Indy 500 in 2014, 2015, 2017, and 2018.)	6
Dale Coyne Racing with Vasser Sullivan	Honda	18	(France) Sébastien Bourdais	All
DragonSpeed	Chevrolet	81	(United Kingdom) Ben Hanley R	1, 3, 6
Dreyer & Reinbold Racing	Chevrolet	24	(United States) Sage Karam	6
Dreyer & Reinbold Racing	Chevrolet	48	(United States) J. R. Hildebrand	6
Ed Carpenter Racing	Chevrolet	21	(United States) Spencer Pigot	All
Ed Carpenter Racing	Chevrolet	20	(United States) Ed Carpenter	6, 9, 12, 14–15
Ed Carpenter Racing Scuderia Corsa	Chevrolet	20	(United Arab Emirates) Ed Jones	1–5, 7–8, 10–11, 13, 16–17
Ed Carpenter Racing Scuderia Corsa	Chevrolet	63	(United Arab Emirates) Ed Jones	6
Harding Steinbrenner Racing (Note: Technical partnership with Andretti Autosport.)	Honda	88	(United States) Colton Herta R	All
Juncos Racing	Chevrolet	32	(United States) Kyle Kaiser R	2, 6
McLaren Racing (Note: Technical partnership with Carlin.)	Chevrolet	66	(Spain) Fernando Alonso R (Note: Fernando Alonso is considered a rookie in the IndyCar Series; however, he was not a rookie in the 2019 Indianapolis 500 as he participated in the 2017 Indianapolis 500.)	6
Meyer Shank Racing with Arrow Schmidt Peterson (Note: In order to promote Honda's Acura marque as the new title sponsor of the Grand Prix of Long Beach, Jack Harvey's Meyer Shank Racing entry ran a Honda engine with Acura badging for the Long Beach round.)	Honda	60	(United Kingdom) Jack Harvey	1–6, 10, 13, 16–17
Rahal Letterman Lanigan Racing	Honda	15	(United States) Graham Rahal	All
Rahal Letterman Lanigan Racing	Honda	30	(Japan) Takuma Sato	All
Rahal Letterman Lanigan Racing	Honda	42	(United Kingdom) Jordan King	6
Team Penske	Chevrolet	2	(United States) Josef Newgarden	All
Team Penske	Chevrolet	3	(Brazil) Hélio Castroneves	5–6
Team Penske	Chevrolet	12	(Australia) Will Power	All
Team Penske	Chevrolet	22	(France) Simon Pagenaud	All

R Eligible for Rookie of the Year

=== Team changes ===
On September 19, 2018, it was announced that George Michael Steinbrenner IV's Steinbrenner Racing would join forces with Harding Racing to form a planned two-car operation under the name Harding Steinbrenner Racing. On February 11, it was revealed that the team's second engine lease was only for the Indianapolis 500.

Meyer Shank Racing, after running a 6-race schedule in 2018, expanded their season to 10 races in the 2019 season with driver Jack Harvey.

On October 17, 2018, it was announced that Ed Carpenter Racing and Scuderia Corsa would team up to field Ed Jones in all road and street course events and the Indianapolis 500.

On November 10, 2018, it was announced that McLaren Racing would return to the IndyCar Series at the 2019 Indianapolis 500 with Fernando Alonso behind the wheel. On November 26, 2018, it was revealed that McLaren's entry would be powered by Chevrolet.

On December 6, 2018, it was also announced that Harding Steinbrenner Racing will switch to Honda engines from 2019 season beyond after spending two seasons with Chevrolet engines.

On December 17, 2018, it was announced that DragonSpeed would make their IndyCar debut in 2019, in a 5-race program including the 2019 Indianapolis 500. The entry will be powered by Chevrolet and piloted by Ben Hanley, who will make his IndyCar debut along with the team.

On February 28, 2019, Dreyer & Reinbold Racing announced that they would once again return to run the Indy 500, retaining driver Sage Karam for the fourth consecutive year. On April 22, the team announced that J. R. Hildebrand would return to drive for the team at the Indy 500 for the second year in a row, this time driving with the No. 48 to honor Dan Gurney.

=== Driver changes ===
After both running the final race of the 2018 season at Sonoma with Harding Racing, 2018 Indy Lights champion Patricio O'Ward and runner-up Colton Herta were announced to run the full season with the new partnership of Harding Steinbrenner Racing. However, on February 11, O'Ward and HSR parted ways after the team was unable to support a full-season program for O'Ward. O'Ward later moved to Carlin where he will drive the No. 31 car in 13 races, including the Indianapolis 500 as the team's third entry as Charlie Kimball will race the No. 23 car at the event.

On September 28, 2018, Chip Ganassi Racing announced that they had signed Felix Rosenqvist to drive for the team during the 2019 season. He will replace Ed Jones in the No. 10 car.

On October 17, 2018, Ed Carpenter Racing announced Ed Jones would replace Jordan King driving the No. 20 car on road courses and street circuits. Jones will also drive the No. 63 car in the Indianapolis 500 as Ed Carpenter will continue driving the No. 20 car on ovals.

On October 30, 2018, Schmidt Peterson Motorsports announced that Formula One driver Marcus Ericsson would join the team for the 2019 season to replace the disabled Robert Wickens, though Ericsson will be racing the No. 7 car instead of Wickens' No. 6, which remains open if or "when he wants and is able to return".

On November 14, 2018, Rahal Letterman Lanigan Racing announced that Jordan King would join the team for the Indianapolis 500.

On January 30, 2019, Andretti Autosport announced that Conor Daly would join the team for the Indianapolis 500. On August 8, 2019, Andretti Autosport announced that Daly would return to the team for the final race of the season at Laguna Seca.

On May 31, 2019, Trevor Carlin revealed that Patricio O'Ward would not be competing at the Iowa and Gateway rounds, but the second Carlin car would be run at those two events. In late June, Red Bull announced that O'Ward would be replacing Dan Ticktum at Team Mugen in Super Formula. With this move to another series, and well-known budgetary restrictions after his crash at Indianapolis, O'Ward's rookie IndyCar season was cut short after only 8 races. On July 2, Carlin announced that Sage Karam would take O'Ward's seat in the No. 31 car at Toronto, which was then extended to Iowa. On July 23, Carlin announced that RC Enerson would drive the No. 31 car for the round at Mid-Ohio. Charlie Kimball filled in the final two gaps in the schedule at Gateway and Portland, expanding his planned 5-race schedule to 7 races.

On June 4, 2019, Carlin announced that Max Chilton would not be competing in the last 4 oval events of the season at Texas, Iowa, Pocono, and Gateway. Conor Daly was announced as the driver of the No. 59 car at Texas on the same day, and the No. 59 car will continue to be run for the full season. It was announced on August 12 that Daly would compete in the last two oval races at Pocono and Gateway in the No. 59 car.

On August 29, 2019, it was announced that Marcus Ericsson had been called up by Alfa Romeo Racing in Formula One to be on reserve driver duty at the Belgian Grand Prix. Conor Daly was announced at the same time to be replacing Ericsson for the round at Portland.

== Schedule ==
All races were in the United States apart from the Toronto round.

Icon	Legend
O	Oval/Speedway
R	Road course
S	Street circuit

Rd.	Date	Race Name	Track	City
1	March 10	Firestone Grand Prix of St. Petersburg	S Streets of St. Petersburg	St. Petersburg, Florida
2	March 24	IndyCar Classic	R Circuit of the Americas	Austin, Texas
3	April 7	Honda Indy Grand Prix of Alabama presented by AmFirst	R Barber Motorsports Park	Birmingham, Alabama
4	April 14	Acura Grand Prix of Long Beach	S Streets of Long Beach	Long Beach, California
5	May 11	IndyCar Grand Prix	R Indianapolis Motor Speedway Road Course	Speedway, Indiana
6	May 26	103rd Running of the Indianapolis 500 presented by Gainbridge	O Indianapolis Motor Speedway	Speedway, Indiana
7	June 1	Chevrolet Detroit Grand Prix presented by Lear Corporation	S The Raceway on Belle Isle	Detroit, Michigan
8	June 2	Chevrolet Detroit Grand Prix presented by Lear Corporation	S The Raceway on Belle Isle	Detroit, Michigan
9	June 8	DXC Technology 600	O Texas Motor Speedway	Fort Worth, Texas
10	June 23	REV Group Grand Prix at Road America	R Road America	Elkhart Lake, Wisconsin
11	July 14	Honda Indy Toronto	S Exhibition Place	Toronto, Ontario
12	July 20/21 (Note: The race began late Saturday night and finished at about 1:00 AM Sunday morning.)	Iowa 300	O Iowa Speedway	Newton, Iowa
13	July 28	Honda Indy 200 at Mid-Ohio	R Mid-Ohio Sports Car Course	Lexington, Ohio
14	August 18	ABC Supply 500	O Pocono Raceway	Long Pond, Pennsylvania
15	August 24	Bommarito Automotive Group 500 presented by Axalta and Valvoline	O World Wide Technology Raceway	Madison, Illinois
16	September 1	Grand Prix of Portland	R Portland International Raceway	Portland, Oregon
17	September 22	Firestone Grand Prix of Monterey	R WeatherTech Raceway Laguna Seca	Monterey, California

=== Schedule changes and notes ===
- On June 22, 2018, it was announced that the Phoenix race at ISM Raceway would not be on the 2019 schedule.
- On June 24, 2018, IndyCar and Road America announced a three-year contract extension, keeping the circuit under contract through the 2021 season.
- On July 17, 2018, it was announced that Laguna Seca will be added to the schedule on a three-year contract and will be the 2019 season finale. The event will replace the Indy Grand Prix of Sonoma. It will be the first event there since the 2004 Champ Car season.
- On July 30, 2018, it was announced the Iowa 300 will return to a Saturday night race.
- On August 10, 2018, it was announced that Pocono Raceway will return in 2019.
- On August 16, 2018, an interview with IndyCar's Stephen Starks revealed that Portland would return, while Barber's date could move to early April which in the final schedule it did.
- On August 23, 2018, Texas Motor Speedway confirmed a multi-year agreement to host the IndyCar Series through 2022.
- On September 4, 2018, a March 24, 2019 race was announced at Circuit of the Americas. The Austin American-Statesman reported a 5-year contract for the venue.

== Results ==
Rd.	Race	Pole position	Fastest lap	Most laps led	Race Winner			Report
Rd.	Race	Pole position	Fastest lap	Most laps led	Driver	Team	Manufacturer	Report
1	St. Petersburg	(Australia) Will Power	(United States) Josef Newgarden	(United States) Josef Newgarden	(United States) Josef Newgarden	Team Penske	Chevrolet	Report
2	Austin	(Australia) Will Power	(United States) Colton Herta	(Australia) Will Power	(United States) Colton Herta	Harding Steinbrenner Racing	Honda	Report
3	Birmingham	(Japan) Takuma Sato	(Australia) Will Power	(Japan) Takuma Sato	(Japan) Takuma Sato	Rahal Letterman Lanigan Racing	Honda	Report
4	Long Beach	(United States) Alexander Rossi	(United States) Ryan Hunter-Reay	(United States) Alexander Rossi	(United States) Alexander Rossi	Andretti Autosport	Honda	Report
5	Indianapolis GP	(Sweden) Felix Rosenqvist	(Mexico) Patricio O'Ward	(New Zealand) Scott Dixon	(France) Simon Pagenaud	Team Penske	Chevrolet	Report
6	Indianapolis 500	(France) Simon Pagenaud	(New Zealand) Scott Dixon	(France) Simon Pagenaud	(France) Simon Pagenaud	Team Penske	Chevrolet	Report
7	Detroit 1	(United States) Alexander Rossi (Note: The qualification format for this race featured two separate qualification groups, with the fastest qualifier in each group earning a championship point; the faster of the two group fastest qualifiers would then start on pole, while the other would start from the outside of the front row. Rossi set the fastest overall lap, and was awarded the pole position. Josef Newgarden set the fastest lap in the other qualifying group, and was also awarded a championship point.)	(United States) Josef Newgarden	(United States) Josef Newgarden	(United States) Josef Newgarden	Team Penske	Chevrolet	Report
8	Detroit 2	(United States) Josef Newgarden (Note: The qualification format for this race featured two separate qualification groups, with the fastest qualifier in each group earning a championship point; the faster of the two group fastest qualifiers would then start on pole, while the other would start from the outside of the front row. Newgarden set the fastest overall lap, and was awarded the pole position. Alexander Rossi set the fastest lap in the other qualifying group, and was also awarded a championship point.)	(France) Simon Pagenaud	(New Zealand) Scott Dixon	(New Zealand) Scott Dixon	Chip Ganassi Racing	Honda	Report
9	Texas	(Japan) Takuma Sato	(Japan) Takuma Sato	(United States) Ryan Hunter-Reay	(United States) Josef Newgarden	Team Penske	Chevrolet	Report
10	Road America	(United States) Colton Herta	(United States) Colton Herta	(United States) Alexander Rossi	(United States) Alexander Rossi	Andretti Autosport	Honda	Report
11	Toronto	(France) Simon Pagenaud	(Sweden) Marcus Ericsson	(France) Simon Pagenaud	(France) Simon Pagenaud	Team Penske	Chevrolet	Report
12	Iowa	(France) Simon Pagenaud	(United States) Josef Newgarden	(United States) Josef Newgarden	(United States) Josef Newgarden	Team Penske	Chevrolet	Report
13	Mid-Ohio	(Australia) Will Power	(Canada) James Hinchcliffe	(New Zealand) Scott Dixon	(New Zealand) Scott Dixon	Chip Ganassi Racing	Honda	Report
14	Pocono	(United States) Josef Newgarden (Note: Qualifying for the ABC Supply 500 was canceled due to weather and starting grid was set by entrant points, so Josef Newgarden was gifted the pole position. Because of this, he was not awarded the bonus point typically awarded for qualifying on pole position.)	(Australia) Will Power	(France) Simon Pagenaud	(Australia) Will Power	Team Penske	Chevrolet	Report
15	Gateway	(United States) Josef Newgarden	(United States) Josef Newgarden	(United States) Santino Ferrucci	(Japan) Takuma Sato	Rahal Letterman Lanigan Racing	Honda	Report
16	Portland	(United States) Colton Herta	(France) Sébastien Bourdais	(Australia) Will Power	(Australia) Will Power	Team Penske	Chevrolet	Report
17	Laguna Seca	(United States) Colton Herta	(New Zealand) Scott Dixon	(United States) Colton Herta	(United States) Colton Herta	Harding Steinbrenner Racing	Honda	Report

== Points standings ==
- Ties are broken by number of wins, followed by number of 2nds, 3rds, etc.; then by finishing position in the previous race; then by random draw.

=== Driver standings ===
- At all races except the Indy 500, the pole position qualifier earns one point. The top nine Indy 500 qualifiers receive points, descending from 9 points for the pole position. At double header races, the fastest qualifier of each qualifying group earns one point.
- One point is awarded to each driver who leads at least one race lap. Two additional points are awarded to the driver who leads most laps during a race.
- Entrant-initiated engine change-outs before the engine reaches their required distance run will result in the loss of ten points.

Pos	Driver	STP	COA	BAR	LBH	IGP	INDY	BEL		TMS	ROA	TOR	IOW	MOH	POC	GTW	POR	LAG	Pts
1	(United States) Josef Newgarden	1^{L}*	2	4	2^{L}	15^{L}	4^{8L}	1^{L}*	**19**^{L}	1^{L}	3	4	1^{L}*	14^{L}	**5**^{cL}	**7**^{L}	5	8	641
2	(France) Simon Pagenaud	7	19	9	6	1^{L}	**1**^{1L}*	6	17	6	9	**1**^{L}*	**4**^{L}	6	3^{L}*	5	7	4^{L}	616
3	(United States) Alexander Rossi	5^{L}	9	5^{L}	**1**^{L}*	22	2^{9L}	**2**^{L}	5	2^{L}	1^{L}*	3	6	5	18	13	3	6	608
4	(New Zealand) Scott Dixon	2	13	2^{L}	3	2^{L}*	17^{L}	22	1^{L}*	17^{L}	5	2	2^{L}	1^{L}*	2^{L}	20	16^{L}	3	578
5	(Australia) Will Power	**3**^{L}	**24**^{L}*	11	7^{L}	7	5^{6L}	18	3^{L}	9	2	18	15^{L}	**4**^{L}	1^{L}	22^{L}	1^{L}*	2^{L}	550
6	(Sweden) Felix Rosenqvist RY	4^{L}	23	10	10	**8**^{L}	28^{L}	4	16	12	6	5	14	2^{L}	22	11^{L}	2^{L}	5	425
7	(United States) Colton Herta R	8	1^{L}	24	23	23	33^{5}	12	12	18	**8**	7	18	8	16	9^{L}	**4**^{L}	**1**^{L}*	420
8	(United States) Ryan Hunter-Reay	23	3	8	5	17	8	5	4	5^{L}*	11	16	17	3	19	8	18	10	420
9	(Japan) Takuma Sato	19	7	**1**^{L}*	8^{L}	14	3^{L}	3	13	**15**^{L}	10	22^{L}	20	19	21	1^{L}	15	21	415
10	(United States) Graham Rahal	12	4	23^{L}	4	9^{L}	27	7	7	3^{L}	4^{L}	9	8	9	9	18	23	12	389
11	(France) Sébastien Bourdais	24	5	3^{L}	11	11^{L}	30^{7}	11	9	8^{L}	12	8	9^{L}	11	7	19^{L}	9^{L}	7	387
12	(Canada) James Hinchcliffe	6	16	6^{L}	9	16	11	9	18	19	7	6	3	22	20	12^{L}	20	9	370
13	(United States) Santino Ferrucci R	9	20	15	21	10	7^{L}	19	10^{L}	4	19	11	12	12	4	4^{L}*	17	24	351
14	(United States) Spencer Pigot	11	11	17	18	5	14^{3L}	10	21	14	14	15	5	7	17	21	6	20	335
15	(Brazil) Tony Kanaan	15	12	18	19	20	9	15	22	16	21	17	10	20	8	3	12	16	304
16	(United States) Marco Andretti	13	6	14	13	13	26	16	6	10	23	10	21	15	15	10^{L}	13	14	303
17	(Sweden) Marcus Ericsson R	20	15	7	20	24	23	13	2^{L}	7^{L}	13	20	11	23	12	16^{L}		11	290
18	(United States) Zach Veach	14	22	12	17	12	29	8	8	20	18	13^{L}	7	21	13	14	22	18	271
19	(Brazil) Matheus Leist	22	17	20	15	4	15	21	20	22	20	19	16	18	14	17	8	17	261
20	(United Arab Emirates) Ed Jones	21	14	19	16	6	13^{4}	20	14		22	12		13			14	23	217
21	(United Kingdom) Jack Harvey	10	10	13	22	3	21				15			10			19	19	186
22	(United Kingdom) Max Chilton	16	21	22	14	18	DNQ	17	15		16	14		16			11	13	184
23	(United States) Ed Carpenter						6^{2L}			13			19		6	2			161
24	(United States) Conor Daly						10			11			13		11	6^{L}	21	22	149
25	(United States) Charlie Kimball	17					25			21					10	15	10	15	117
26	(Mexico) Patricio O'Ward R		8	16	12	19	DNQ	14	11		17								115
27	(United States) Sage Karam						19					21	22						39
28	(Australia) James Davison R						12												36
29	(Brazil) Hélio Castroneves					21	18												33
30	(United Kingdom) Ben Hanley R	18		21			32												31
31	(United Kingdom) Pippa Mann						16												28
32	(United States) Kyle Kaiser R		18				31												22
33	(United States) J. R. Hildebrand						20												20
34	(Spain) Oriol Servià						22												16
35	(United States) R. C. Enerson R													17					13
36	(United Kingdom) Jordan King						24												12
–	(Spain) Fernando Alonso R						DNQ												–
Pos	Driver	STP	COA	BAR	LBH	IMS	INDY	BEL		TMS	ROA	TOR	IOW	MOH	POC	GTW	POR	LAG	Pts

Color	Result
Gold	Winner
Silver	2nd-place finish
Bronze	3rd-place finish
Green	Top 5 finish
Light Blue	Top 10 finish
Dark Blue	Other flagged position
Purple	Did not finish
Red	Did not qualify (DNQ)
Brown	Withdrew (Wth)
Black	Disqualified (DSQ)
White	Did Not Start (DNS)
White	Race abandoned (C)
Blank	Did not participate

**In-line notation**
**Bold**	Pole position (1 point; except Indy)
Italics	Ran fastest race lap
^{L}	Led race lap (1 point)
*	Led most race laps (2 points)
^{1–9}	Indy 500 "Fast Nine" bonus points
^{c}	Qualifying canceled (no bonus point)
RY	Rookie of the Year
R	Rookie

=== Entrant standings ===
- Based on the entrant, used for oval qualifications order, and starting grids when qualifying is cancelled.
- Only full-time entrants, and at-large part-time entrants shown.

Pos	Driver	STP	COA	BAR	LBH	IGP	INDY	BEL		TMS	ROA	TOR	IOW	MOH	POC	GTW	POR	LAG	Pts
1	#2 Team Penske	1^{L}*	2	4	2^{L}	15^{L}	4^{8L}	1^{L}*	**19**^{L}	1^{L}	3	4	1^{L}*	14^{L}	**5**^{L}	**7**^{L}	5	8	641
2	#22 Team Penske	7	19	9	6	1^{L}	**1**^{1L}*	6	17	6	9	**1**^{L}*	**4**^{L}	6	3^{L}*	5	7	4^{L}	616
3	#27 Andretti Autosport	5^{L}	9	5^{L}	**1**^{L}*	22	2^{9L}	**2**^{L}	5	2^{L}	1^{L}*	3	6	5	18	13	3	6	608
4	#9 Chip Ganassi Racing	2	13	2^{L}	3	2^{L}*	17^{L}	22	1^{L}*	17^{L}	5	2	2^{L}	1^{L}*	2^{L}	20	16^{L}	3	578
5	#12 Team Penske	**3**^{L}	**24**^{L}*	11	7^{L}	7	5^{6L}	18	3^{L}	9	2	18	15^{L}	**4**^{L}	1^{L}	22^{L}	1^{L}*	2^{L}	550
6	#10 Chip Ganassi Racing	4^{L}	23	10	10	**8**^{L}	28^{L}	4	16	12	6	5	14	2^{L}	22	11^{L}	2^{L}	5	425
7	#88 Harding Steinbrenner Racing	8	1^{L}	24	23	23	33^{5}	12	12	18	**8**	7	18	8	16	9^{L}	**4**^{L}	**1**^{L}*	420
8	#28 Andretti Autosport	23	3	8	5	17	8	5	4	5^{L}*	11	16	17	3	19	8	18	10	420
9	#30 Rahal Letterman Lanigan Racing	19	7	**1**^{L}*	8^{L}	14	3^{L}	3	13	**15**^{L}	10	22^{L}	20	19	21	1^{L}	15	21	415
10	#15 Rahal Letterman Lanigan Racing	12	4	23^{L}	4	9^{L}	27	7	7	3^{L}	4^{L}	9	8	9	9	18	23	12	389
11	#18 Dale Coyne Racing with Vasser Sullivan	24	5	3^{L}	11	11^{L}	30^{7}	11	9	8^{L}	12	8	9^{L}	11	7	19^{L}	9^{L}	7	387
12	#5 Arrow Schmidt Peterson Motorsports	6	16	6^{L}	9	16	11	9	18	19	7	6	3	22	20	12^{L}	20	9	370
13	#19 Dale Coyne Racing	9	20	15	21	10	7^{L}	19	10^{L}	4	19	11	12	12	4	4^{L}*	17	24	351
14	#20 Ed Carpenter Racing	21	14	19	16	6	13^{4}	20	14	13	22	12	19	13	6	2	14	23	338
15	#21 Ed Carpenter Racing	11	11	17	18	5	14^{3L}	10	21	14	14	15	5	7	17	21	6	20	335
16	#14 A. J. Foyt Enterprises	15	12	18	19	20	9	15	22	16	21	17	10	20	8	3	12	16	304
17	#98 Andretti Herta Autosport w/ Marco Andretti & Curb-Agajanian	13	6	14	13	13	26	16	6	10	23	10	21	15	15	10^{L}	13	14	303
18	#7 Arrow Schmidt Peterson Motorsports	20	15	7	20	24	23	13	2^{L}	7^{L}	13	20	11	23	12	16^{L}	21	11	299
19	#26 Andretti Autosport	14	22	12	17	12	29	8	8	20	18	13^{L}	7	21	13	14	22	18	271
20	#59 Carlin	16	21	22	14	18	DNQ	17	15	11	16	14	13	16	11	6^{L}	11	13	268
21	#23/31 Carlin	17	8	16	12	19	25	14	11	21	17	21	22	17	10	15	10	15	262
22	#4 A. J. Foyt Enterprises	22	17	20	15	4	15	21	20	22	20	19	16	18	14	17	8	17	261
23	#60 Meyer Shank Racing with Arrow Schmidt Peterson	10	10	13	22	3	21				15			10			19	19	186
Pos	Driver	STP	COA	BAR	LBH	IMS	INDY	BEL		TMS	ROA	TOR	IOW	MOH	POC	GTW	POR	LAG	Pts

=== Manufacturer standings ===
- All manufacturer points (including qualifying points, race finish points, and race win bonus points) can only be earned by full-season entrants, (Note: Rule 12.6.5.) and provided they are using their four engine allocation. (Note: Rule 16.2.3.2.) Ineligible cars are removed from the finishing order used for race finish points. (Note: Rule 16.2.3.3.)
- The top two finishing entrants from each manufacturer in each race score points for their respective manufacturer. The manufacturer that wins each race will be awarded five additional points.
- At all races except the Indy 500, the manufacturer who qualifies on pole earns one point. At the Indy 500, the fastest Saturday qualifier earns one point, while the pole position winner on Sunday earns two points.
- For every full-season engine used during the Indy 500 that reaches 2,000 total miles run, the manufacturer earns bonus points equal to that engine's finishing position in the race.

Pos	Manufacturer	STP	COA	BAR	LBH	IGP	INDY	BEL		TMS	ROA	TOR	IOW	MOH	POC	GTW	POR	LAG	Bonus	Pts
1	Honda	2	1	1	1	2	2	2	1	2	1	2	2	1	1	2	7	1	75	1436
1	Honda	4	3	2	3	7	3	3	2	3	4	3	3	2	3	5	8	3	75	1436
1	Honda	72	**90**	**96**^{P}	**91**^{P}	67^{P}	75	76^{P}	**95**	76^{P}	**88**^{P}	75	75	**95**	**85**	70	50	85	75	1436
2	Chevrolet	1	2	4	2	1	1	1	3	1	2	1	1	5	2	1	1	2	82	1387
2	Chevrolet	3	8	9	6	3	4	6	11	6	3	4	4	6	4	3	2	5	82	1387
2	Chevrolet	**91**^{P}	65^{P}	54	68	**90**	**90**^{P}	**83**	55^{P}	**83**	75	**88**^{P}	**88**^{P}	58	72	**85**	**90**	70	82	1387

Manufacturer Championship results breakdown
Entrant	STP	COA	BAR	LBH	IMS	INDY	BEL		TMS	ROA	TOR	IOW	MOH	POC	GTW	POR	LAG
Chevrolet
#2 Penske	1	2	4	2	14	4	1	**19**	1	3	4	1	12	Ineligible			
#4 Foyt	20	16	19	15	3	12	21	20	22	19	19	16	16	10	11	3	9
#12 Penske	**3**	**22**	11	7	6	5	18	3	9	2	18	15	Ineligible				
#14 Foyt	14	11	17	19	19	9	15	22	16	20	17	10	18	4	1	6	8
#20 ECR	19	13	18	16	5	6	20	14	13	21	12	19	11	Ineligible			
#21 ECR	10	10	16	18	4	11	10	21	14	14	15	5	6	12	14	1	11
#22 Penske	7	17	9	6	1	**1**	6	17	6	9	**1**	**4**	5	2	3	2	2
#23 Carlin	16	8	15	12	18	15	14	11	21	16	21	22	15	6	9	4	7
#59 Carlin	15	19	20	14	17	DNQ	17	15	11	15	14	13	14	7	4	5	5
Race Finish	85	64	54	68	85	82	78	54	78	75	82	82	58	72	85	90	66
Indy Bonus	-	-	-	-	-	82	-	-	-	-	-	-	-	-	-	-	-
Pole Bonus	1	1	-	-	-	3	-	1	-	-	1	1	0	0	0	-	-
Win Bonus	5	-	-	-	5	5	5	-	5	-	5	5	-	0	-	0	-
Total points	91	65	54	68	90	172	83	55	83	75	88	88	58	72	85	90	70
Honda
#5 SPM	6	15	6	9	15	10	9	18	19	7	6	3	20	14	7	11	Inel.
#7 SPM	18	14	7	20	22	14	13	2	7	13	20	11	21	8	10	12	3
#9 Ganassi	2	12	2	3	2	13	22	1	17	5	2	2	1	1	13	8	1
#10 Ganassi	4	21	10	10	**7**	18	4	16	12	6	5	14	2	Ineligible			
#15 RLL	11	4	21	4	8	17	7	7	3	4	9	8	8	5	12	14	4
#18 Coyne	22	5	3	11	10	20	11	9	8	12	8	9	9	Ineligible			
#19 Coyne	9	18	14	21	9	7	19	10	4	18	11	12	10	3	2	9	Inel.
#26 Andretti	13	20	12	17	11	19	8	8	20	17	13	7	19	9	8	13	10
#27 Andretti	5	9	5	**1**	20	2	**2**	5	2	1	3	6	4	Ineligible			
#28 Andretti	21	3	8	5	16	8	5	4	5	11	16	17	3	13	5	10	Inel.
#30 RLL	17	7	**1**	8	13	3	3	13	**15**	10	22	20	17	15	Ineligible		
#88 Harding	8	1	22	22	21	21	12	12	18	**8**	7	18	7	Ineligible			
#98 Herta	12	6	13	13	12	16	16	6	10	22	10	21	13	11	6	7	6
Race Finish	72	85	90	85	66	75	75	90	75	82	75	75	90	85	70	50	85
Indy Bonus	-	-	-	-	-	75	-	-	-	-	-	-	-	-	-	-	
Pole Bonus	-	-	1	1	1	-	1	-	1	1	-	-	-	-	-	0	0
Win Bonus	-	5	5	5	-	-	-	5	-	5	-	-	5	-	0	-	0
Total points	72	90	96	91	67	150	76	95	76	88	75	75	95	85	70	50	85

== See also ==
- 2019 Indy Lights
- 2019 Indy Pro 2000 Championship
- 2019 U.S. F2000 National Championship
