= 2020 12 Hours of Sebring =

68th 12 Hours of Sebring race

Sebring International Raceway

The 2020 12 Hours of Sebring (formally known as the 68th Mobil 1 Twelve Hours of Sebring Presented by Advance Auto Parts) was an endurance sports car race held at Sebring International Raceway near Sebring, Florida from 11–14 November 2020, after being postponed from its original date on 14–15 March 2020 due to the COVID-19 outbreak. The race was the final round of the 2020 WeatherTech SportsCar Championship, as well as the final round of the Michelin Endurance Cup. Action Express Racing entered as the defending overall winners of the 12-hour event.

== Background ==
The 2020 12 Hours of Sebring event was supposed to run in conjunction with the 2020 1000 Miles of Sebring, held on the Friday before the 12 Hours of Sebring. The two events usually are run in conjunction with each other as an agreement between the International Motor Sports Association (IMSA), the governing body of the WeatherTech SportsCar Championship, and the FIA, to be a joint weekend, known colloquially as “Super Sebring.” The first joint weekend between the two events was run a year prior in 2019, to massive success, providing some of the largest attendance figures ever recorded in the history of the 12 Hours of Sebring. Initially announced on a one-year deal, the success of the 2019 Super Sebring would lead to confirmation that the 1000 Miles of Sebring and 12 Hours of Sebring would run together again for the following year, however due to travel restrictions brought about by COVID-19 the 1000 Miles of Sebring would not return until 2022.

Then International Motor Sports Association's (IMSA) president Scott Atherton confirmed the race was part of the schedule for the 2020 IMSA SportsCar Championship (IMSA SCC) in August 2019. It was the seventh consecutive year it was part of the IMSA SCC, and the 68th 12 Hours of Sebring. The event was originally scheduled to be held at the 17-turn, 3.741-mile (6.021 km) Sebring International Raceway in Sebring, Florida on March 15, 2020, however due to travel restrictions brought about by COVID-19, the race was postponed to November 14, 2020. As a result, the 12 Hours of Sebring became the eleventh and final round of the 2020 season and the fourth event of the Michelin Endurance Cup (MEC). Additionally, the event clashed with the FIA World Endurance Championship round at Bahrain and the GT World Challenge Europe round at Circuit Paul Ricard.

Before the race, Helio Castroneves and Ricky Taylor led the DPi Drivers' Championship with 242 points, ahead of Ryan Briscoe and Renger van der Zande with 240 points, and Pipo Derani with 233 points. With 161 points, Patrick Kelly led the LMP2 Drivers' Championship, ahead of Simon Trummer with 126 points. Antonio García and Jordan Taylor led the GTLM Drivers' Championship with 325 points, ahead of Oliver Gavin and Tommy Milner with 290 points. In GTD, Mario Farnbacher and Matt McMurry led the Drivers' Championship, 7 points ahead of Ryan Hardwick and Patrick Long in second, and Aaron Telitz in third with 248 points. Cadillac, Chevrolet, and Acura were leading their respective Manufacturers' Championships, while Acura Team Penske, PR1/Mathiasen Motorsports, Corvette Racing, and Meyer Shank Racing with Curb-Agajanian each led their own Teams' Championships.

=== Entries ===
A total of 31 cars took part in the event split across four classes. 8 cars were entered in DPi, 4 in LMP2, 6 in GTLM, and 13 in GTD. In DPi, Gabby Chaves subbed for Filipe Albuquerque in the Whelen Engineering Racing entry due to a clash with the FIA World Endurance Championship round at Bahrain. Scott Andrews joined Stephen Simpson and Matheus Leist in the #85 JDC-Miller MotorSports entry. In LMP2, Tower Motorsport By Starworks, Performance Tech Motorsports, and Inter Europol Competition returned after skipping the previous event at Laguna Seca. Guy Cosmo and Patrick Byrne joined Don Yount in the Performance Tech Motorsports entry. In GTLM, Neel Jani subbed for Mathieu Jaminet in the #912 Porsche GT Team entry due to a clash with the GT World Challenge Europe round at Circuit Paul Ricard. Earl Bamber subbed for Matt Campbell in the #911 Porsche GT Team entry due to a clash with the GT World Challenge Europe round at Circuit Paul Ricard. In GTD, Marc Miller subbed for Ben Keating in the Riley Motorsports entry due to a clash with the FIA World Endurance Championship round at Bahrain. Joey Hand subbed for Álvaro Parente in the #57 Heinricher Racing with MSR Curb-Agajanian. Nick Yelloly subbed for Bill Auberlen in the Turner Motorsport entry due to quarantine. GRT Grasser Racing Team made their first appearance since the TireRack.com Grand Prix at Road Atlanta. Pierre Kaffer joined Andrew Davis and Robert Ferriol in the Team Hardpoint entry.

== Practice ==
There were three practice sessions preceding the start of the race on Saturday, all three were on Thursday. The first session held Thursday morning lasted one hour. The second session held Thursday afternoon lasted 75 minutes. The final session held Thursday evening lasted 90 minutes.

=== Practice 1 ===
The first practice session took place at 10:05 am ET on Thursday and ended with Hélio Castroneves topping the charts for Acura Team Penske, with a lap time of 1:49.360. Simon Trummer was fastest in LMP2 with a time of 1:52.040. Frédéric Makowiecki set the fastest time in GTLM with a time of 1:58.717. The GTD class was topped by the #14 AIM Vasser Sullivan Lexus RC F GT3 of Jack Hawksworth with a lap time of 2:02.961.

Pos.	Class	No.	Team	Driver	Time	Gap
1	DPi	7	Acura Team Penske	Hélio Castroneves	1:49.360	_
2	DPi	5	JDC-Mustang Sampling Racing	Sébastien Bourdais	1:49.395	+0.035
3	DPi	85	JDC-Miller MotorSports	Matheus Leist	1:49.828	+0.468

=== Practice 2 ===
The second practice session took place at 2:35 pm ET on Thursday and ended with Renger van der Zande topping the charts for Konica Minolta Cadillac, with a lap time of 1:47.478. Mikkel Jensen set the fastest time in LMP2. The GTLM class was topped by the #912 Porsche GT Team Porsche 911 RSR-19 of Laurens Vanthoor with a time of 1:57.975. Frédéric Makowiecki was second in the #911 Porsche GT Team car and Jordan Taylor rounded out the top 3. The GTD class was topped by the #11 GRT Grasser Racing Team Lamborghini Huracán GT3 Evo of Steijn Schothorst with a time of 2:02.352.

Pos.	Class	No.	Team	Driver	Time	Gap
1	DPi	10	Konica Minolta Cadillac	Renger van der Zande	1:47.478	_
2	DPi	5	JDC-Mustang Sampling Racing	Sébastien Bourdais	1:47.645	+0.167
3	DPi	31	Whelen Engineering Racing	Pipo Derani	1:48.241	+0.763

=== Practice 3 ===
The third and final practice session took place at 6:15 pm ET on Thursday and ended with Ricky Taylor topping the charts for Acura Team Penske, with a lap time of 1:48.358. Mikkel Jensen was fastest in LMP2 with a time of 1:50.127. The GTLM class was topped by the #911 Porsche GT Team Porsche 911 RSR-19 of Nick Tandy with a time of 1:58.170. Laurens Vanthoor was second in the #912 Porsche GT Team car and Connor De Phillippi rounded out the top 3. The GTD class was topped by the #11 GRT Grasser Racing Team Lamborghini Huracán GT3 Evo of Franck Perera with a time of 2:02.510.

Pos.	Class	No.	Team	Driver	Time	Gap
1	DPi	7	Acura Team Penske	Ricky Taylor	1:48.358	_
2	DPi	31	Whelen Engineering Racing	Pipo Derani	1:48.535	+0.177
3	DPi	77	Mazda Motorsports	Oliver Pla	1:48.617	+0.259

== Qualifying ==
Friday's morning qualifying was broken into three sessions, with one session for the DPi and LMP2, GTLM, and GTD classes, which lasted for 15 minutes each, and a ten minute interval between the sessions. The rules dictated that all teams nominated a driver to qualify their cars, with the Pro-Am (LMP2/GTD) classes requiring a Bronze/Silver Rated Driver to qualify the car. The competitors' fastest lap times determined the starting order. IMSA then arranged the grid to put DPis ahead of the LMP2, GTLM, and GTD cars.

The first was for cars in GTD class. Jan Heylen qualified on pole for the class driving the #16 car for Wright Motorsports.

The second session of qualifying was for cars in the GTLM class. Antonio García qualified on pole driving the #3 car for Corvette Racing, beating Connor De Phillippi in the #25 BMW Team RLL entry by over six tenths of a second.

The final session of qualifying was for the DPi class. Ricky Taylor qualified on pole driving the #7 car for Acura Team Penske, beating Renger van der Zande in the #10 Konica Minolta Cadillac DPi-V.R car by over two tenths of a second. Patrick Kelly set the fastest time in LMP2 driving the #52 PR1/Mathiasen Motorsports car.

=== Qualifying results ===
Pole positions in each class are indicated in bold and by ‡.

Pos.	Class	No.	Team	Driver	Time	Gap	Grid
1	**DPi**	**7**	**(United States) Acura Team Penske**	**(United States) Ricky Taylor**	**1:46.874**	**_**	1‡
2	DPi	10	(United States) Konica Minolta Cadillac	(Netherlands) Renger van der Zande	1:47.125	+0.251	2
3	DPi	6	(United States) Acura Team Penske	(United States) Dane Cameron	1:47.140	+0.266	3
4	DPi	5	(United States) JDC-Mustang Sampling Racing	(France) Sébastien Bourdais	1:47.209	+0.335	4
5	DPi	55	(Canada) Mazda Motorsports	(United Kingdom) Harry Tincknell	1:47.245	+0.371	5
6	DPi	31	(United States) Whelen Engineering Racing	(Brazil) Pipo Derani	1:47.327	+0.453	6
7	DPi	77	(Canada) Mazda Motorsports	(United Kingdom) Oliver Jarvis	1:47.474	+0.600	7
8	DPi	85	(United States) JDC-Miller MotorSports	(Brazil) Matheus Leist	1:47.696	+0.822	8
9	**LMP2**	**52**	**(United States) PR1/Mathiasen Motorsports**	**(United States) Patrick Kelly**	**1:51.373**	**+4.499**	9‡
10	LMP2	51	(Poland) Inter Europol Competition	(United States) Naveen Rao	1:53.147	+6.273	10
11	LMP2	38	(United States) Performance Tech Motorsports	(United States) Don Yount	1:54.045	+7.171	11
12	LMP2	8	(United States) Tower Motorsports by Starworks	(Canada) John Farano	1:54.194	+7.320	12^{1}
13	**GTLM**	**3**	**(United States) Corvette Racing**	**(Spain) Antonio García**	**1:55.456**	**+8.582**	13‡
14	GTLM	25	(United States) BMW Team RLL	(United States) Connor De Phillippi	1:56.116	+9.242	14
15	GTLM	24	(United States) BMW Team RLL	(Finland) Jesse Krohn	1:56.316	+9.442	15
16	GTLM	4	(United States) Corvette Racing	(United States) Tommy Milner	1:56.446	+9.572	16
17	GTLM	911	(United States) Porsche GT Team	(United Kingdom) Nick Tandy	1:56.840	+9.966	17^{2}
18	GTLM	912	(United States) Porsche GT Team	(Switzerland) Neel Jani	1:57.774	+10.900	18^{3}
19	**GTD**	**16**	**(United States) Wright Motorsports**	**(Belgium) Jan Heylen**	**2:00.844**	**+13.970**	19‡
20	GTD	30	(United States) Team Hardpoint	(United States) Andrew Davis	2:01.546	+14.672	20
21	GTD	14	(Canada) AIM Vasser Sullivan	(United States) Aaron Telitz	2:01.605	+14.731	21
22	GTD	11	(Austria) GRT Grasser Racing Team	(United States) Richard Heistand	2:01.652	+14.778	22
23	GTD	63	(United States) Scuderia Corsa	(United States) Cooper MacNeil	2:01.802	+14.928	23
24	GTD	12	(Canada) AIM Vasser Sullivan	(United States) Frankie Montecalvo	2:01.839	+14.965	24
25	GTD	96	(United States) Turner Motorsport	(United States) Robby Foley	2:02.210	+15.336	25
26	GTD	86	(United States) Meyer Shank Racing with Curb-Agajanian	(Japan) Shinya Michimi	2:02.286	+15.412	26
27	GTD	48	(United States) Paul Miller Racing	(United States) Madison Snow	2:02.435	+15.561	27
28	GTD	74	(United States) Riley Motorsports	(United States) Gar Robinson	2:02.689	+15.815	28
29	GTD	23	(United States) Heart of Racing Team	(United Kingdom) Ian James	2:02.705	+15.831	29
30	GTD	57	(United States) Heinricher Racing with MSR Curb-Agajanian	(Canada) Misha Goikhberg	2:03.153	+16.279	30
31	GTD	44	(United States) GRT Magnus	(United States) John Potter	2:04.363	+17.489	31

- ^{1} The No. 8 Tower Motorsport by Starworks entry was moved to the back of the LMP2 field as per Article 40.1.4 of the Sporting regulations (Change of starting tires).
- ^{2} The No. 911 Porsche GT Team entry was moved to the back of the GTLM field as per Article 40.1.4 of the Sporting regulations (Change of starting tires).
- ^{3} The No. 912 Porsche GT Team entry was moved to the back of the GTLM field as per Article 40.1.4 of the Sporting regulations (Change of starting tires).

== Post-race ==
Helio Castroneves and Ricky Taylor took the DPi Drivers' Championship with 265 points. They were 1 point ahead of Briscoe and van der Zande in second position. Bomarito and Tincknell followed in third place with 260 points, ahead of Derani in fourth with 258 points. Bourdais was fifth with 249 points. With 196 points, Kelly won the LMP2 Drivers' Championship, 34 points ahead of Trummer in second. Antonio García and Jordan Taylor took the GTLM Drivers' Championship with 351 points. They were 32 points ahead of Edwards and Krohn in second with 319 points. Gavin and Milner followed in third with 315 points, ahead of De Phillippi and Spengler with 313 points. With 286 points, Farnbacher and McMurry won the GTD Drivers' Championship, 2 points ahead of Hardwick and Long in second. Telitz was in third position with 267 points and Hawksworth was fourth with 265 points. Chevrolet took the GTLM Manufactures' Championship while Acura won the DPi and GTD Manufactures' Championships. Acura Team Penske, PR1/Mathiasen Motorsports, Corvette Racing, and Meyer Shank Racing with Curb-Agajanian on their respective Teams' Championships.

=== Results ===
Class winners are denoted in bold and ‡.

Pos	Class	No	Team	Drivers	Chassis	Laps	Time/Retired
Pos	Class	No	Team	Drivers	Engine	Laps	Time/Retired
1	**DPi**	**55**	**(Canada) Mazda Motorsports**	**(United States) Jonathan Bomarito (United States) Ryan Hunter-Reay (United Kingdom) Harry Tincknell**	**Mazda RT24-P**	**348**	**12:00:36.538‡**
1	**DPi**	**55**	**(Canada) Mazda Motorsports**	**(United States) Jonathan Bomarito (United States) Ryan Hunter-Reay (United Kingdom) Harry Tincknell**	**Mazda MZ-2.0T 2.0 L Turbo I4**	**348**	**12:00:36.538‡**
2	DPi	6	(United States) Acura Team Penske	(United States) Dane Cameron (Colombia) Juan Pablo Montoya (France) Simon Pagenaud	Acura ARX-05	348	+10.154
2	DPi	6	(United States) Acura Team Penske	(United States) Dane Cameron (Colombia) Juan Pablo Montoya (France) Simon Pagenaud	Acura AR35TT 3.5 L Turbo V6	348	+10.154
3	DPi	77	(Canada) Mazda Motorsports	(United Kingdom) Oliver Jarvis (United States) Tristan Nunez (France) Olivier Pla	Mazda RT24-P	348	+11.704
3	DPi	77	(Canada) Mazda Motorsports	(United Kingdom) Oliver Jarvis (United States) Tristan Nunez (France) Olivier Pla	Mazda MZ-2.0T 2.0 L Turbo I4	348	+11.704
4	DPi	85	(United States) JDC-Miller Motorsports	(Australia) Scott Andrews (Brazil) Matheus Leist (South Africa) Stephen Simpson	Cadillac DPi-V.R	347	+1 Lap
4	DPi	85	(United States) JDC-Miller Motorsports	(Australia) Scott Andrews (Brazil) Matheus Leist (South Africa) Stephen Simpson	Cadillac 5.5 L V8	347	+1 Lap
5	DPi	5	(United States) JDC-Mustang Sampling Racing	(France) Sébastien Bourdais (France) Loïc Duval (France) Tristan Vautier	Cadillac DPi-V.R	346	+2 Laps
5	DPi	5	(United States) JDC-Mustang Sampling Racing	(France) Sébastien Bourdais (France) Loïc Duval (France) Tristan Vautier	Cadillac 5.5 L V8	346	+2 Laps
6	DPi	31	(United States) Whelen Engineering Racing	(Colombia) Gabby Chaves (Brazil) Pipo Derani (Brazil) Felipe Nasr	Cadillac DPi-V.R	346	+2 Laps
6	DPi	31	(United States) Whelen Engineering Racing	(Colombia) Gabby Chaves (Brazil) Pipo Derani (Brazil) Felipe Nasr	Cadillac 5.5 L V8	346	+2 Laps
7	DPi	10	(United States) Konica Minolta Cadillac	(Australia) Ryan Briscoe (New Zealand) Scott Dixon (Netherlands) Renger van der Zande	Cadillac DPi-V.R	341	+7 Laps
7	DPi	10	(United States) Konica Minolta Cadillac	(Australia) Ryan Briscoe (New Zealand) Scott Dixon (Netherlands) Renger van der Zande	Cadillac 5.5 L V8	341	+7 Laps
8	DPi	7	(United States) Acura Team Penske	(Brazil) Hélio Castroneves (United States) Alexander Rossi (United States) Ricky Taylor	Acura ARX-05	341	+7 Laps
8	DPi	7	(United States) Acura Team Penske	(Brazil) Hélio Castroneves (United States) Alexander Rossi (United States) Ricky Taylor	Acura AR35TT 3.5 L Turbo V6	341	+7 Laps
9	**LMP2**	**52**	**(United States) PR1/Mathiasen Motorsports**	**(United States) Scott Huffaker (United States) Patrick Kelly (Switzerland) Simon Trummer**	**Oreca 07**	**340**	**+8 Laps‡**
9	**LMP2**	**52**	**(United States) PR1/Mathiasen Motorsports**	**(United States) Scott Huffaker (United States) Patrick Kelly (Switzerland) Simon Trummer**	**Gibson GK428 4.2 L V8**	**340**	**+8 Laps‡**
10	LMP2	8	(United Kingdom) Tower Motorsports by Starworks	(Canada) John Farano (Denmark) David Heinemeier Hansson (Denmark) Mikkel Jensen	Oreca 07	338	+10 Laps
10	LMP2	8	(United Kingdom) Tower Motorsports by Starworks	(Canada) John Farano (Denmark) David Heinemeier Hansson (Denmark) Mikkel Jensen	Gibson GK428 4.2 L V8	338	+10 Laps
11	LMP2	38	(United States) Performance Tech Motorsports	(United States) Patrick Byrne (United States) Guy Cosmo (United States) Don Yount	Oreca 07	332	+16 Laps
11	LMP2	38	(United States) Performance Tech Motorsports	(United States) Patrick Byrne (United States) Guy Cosmo (United States) Don Yount	Gibson GK428 4.2 L V8	332	+16 Laps
12	**GTLM**	**911**	**(United States) Porsche GT Team**	**(New Zealand) Earl Bamber (France) Frédéric Makowiecki (United Kingdom) Nick Tandy**	**Porsche 911 RSR-19**	**332**	**+16 Laps‡**
12	**GTLM**	**911**	**(United States) Porsche GT Team**	**(New Zealand) Earl Bamber (France) Frédéric Makowiecki (United Kingdom) Nick Tandy**	**Porsche 4.2 L Flat-6**	**332**	**+16 Laps‡**
13	GTLM	912	(United States) Porsche GT Team	(New Zealand) Earl Bamber (Switzerland) Neel Jani (Belgium) Laurens Vanthoor	Porsche 911 RSR-19	332	+16 Laps
13	GTLM	912	(United States) Porsche GT Team	(New Zealand) Earl Bamber (Switzerland) Neel Jani (Belgium) Laurens Vanthoor	Porsche 4.2 L Flat-6	332	+16 Laps
14	GTLM	24	(United States) BMW Team RLL	(United States) John Edwards (Brazil) Augusto Farfus (Finland) Jesse Krohn	BMW M8 GTE	331	+17 Laps
14	GTLM	24	(United States) BMW Team RLL	(United States) John Edwards (Brazil) Augusto Farfus (Finland) Jesse Krohn	BMW S63 4.0 L Turbo V8	331	+17 Laps
15	GTLM	25	(United States) BMW Team RLL	(United States) Connor De Phillippi (United States) Colton Herta (Canada) Bruno Spengler	BMW M8 GTE	330	+18 Laps
15	GTLM	25	(United States) BMW Team RLL	(United States) Connor De Phillippi (United States) Colton Herta (Canada) Bruno Spengler	BMW S63 4.0 L Turbo V8	330	+18 Laps
16	GTLM	3	(United States) Corvette Racing	(Netherlands) Nicky Catsburg (Spain) Antonio García (United States) Jordan Taylor	Chevrolet Corvette C8.R	323	+25 Laps
16	GTLM	3	(United States) Corvette Racing	(Netherlands) Nicky Catsburg (Spain) Antonio García (United States) Jordan Taylor	Chevrolet 5.5 L V8	323	+25 Laps
17	LMP2	51	(Poland) Inter Europol Competition	(United Kingdom) Matthew Bell (United States) Naveen Rao (Poland) Jakub Śmiechowski	Oreca 07	320	+28 Laps
17	LMP2	51	(Poland) Inter Europol Competition	(United Kingdom) Matthew Bell (United States) Naveen Rao (Poland) Jakub Śmiechowski	Gibson GK428 4.2 L V8	320	+28 Laps
18	**GTD**	**16**	**(United States) Wright Motorsports**	**(United States) Ryan Hardwick (Belgium) Jan Heylen (United States) Patrick Long**	**Porsche 911 GT3 R**	**319**	**+29 Laps‡**
18	**GTD**	**16**	**(United States) Wright Motorsports**	**(United States) Ryan Hardwick (Belgium) Jan Heylen (United States) Patrick Long**	**Porsche 4.0 L Flat-6**	**319**	**+29 Laps‡**
19	GTD	23	(United States) Heart of Racing Team	(Canada) Roman De Angelis (United Kingdom) Ian James (United Kingdom) Darren Turner	Aston Martin Vantage AMR GT3	319	+29 Laps
19	GTD	23	(United States) Heart of Racing Team	(Canada) Roman De Angelis (United Kingdom) Ian James (United Kingdom) Darren Turner	Aston Martin 4.0 L Turbo V8	319	+29 Laps
20	GTD	86	(United States) Meyer Shank Racing w/Curb-Agajanian	(Germany) Mario Farnbacher (United States) Matt McMurry (Japan) Shinya Michimi	Acura NSX GT3 Evo	319	+29 Laps
20	GTD	86	(United States) Meyer Shank Racing w/Curb-Agajanian	(Germany) Mario Farnbacher (United States) Matt McMurry (Japan) Shinya Michimi	Acura 3.5 L Turbo V6	319	+29 Laps
21	GTD	63	(United States) Scuderia Corsa	(Italy) Alessandro Balzan (United States) Cooper MacNeil (United States) Jeff Westphal	Ferrari 488 GT3	319	+29 Laps
21	GTD	63	(United States) Scuderia Corsa	(Italy) Alessandro Balzan (United States) Cooper MacNeil (United States) Jeff Westphal	Ferrari F154CB 3.9 L Turbo V8	319	+29 Laps
22	GTD	30	(United States) Team Hardpoint	(United States) Andrew Davis (United States) Robert Ferriol (Germany) Pierre Kaffer	Audi R8 LMS Evo	319	+29 Laps
22	GTD	30	(United States) Team Hardpoint	(United States) Andrew Davis (United States) Robert Ferriol (Germany) Pierre Kaffer	Audi 5.2 L V10	319	+29 Laps
23	GTD	57	(United States) Heinricher Racing w/MSR Curb-Agajanian	(Canada) Mikhail Goikhberg (United States) Trent Hindman (United States) Joey Hand	Acura NSX GT3 Evo	319	+29 Laps
23	GTD	57	(United States) Heinricher Racing w/MSR Curb-Agajanian	(Canada) Mikhail Goikhberg (United States) Trent Hindman (United States) Joey Hand	Acura 3.5 L Turbo V6	319	+29 Laps
24	GTD	44	(United States) GRT Magnus Racing	(United States) Andy Lally (United States) John Potter (United States) Spencer Pumpelly	Lamborghini Huracán GT3 Evo	319	+29 Laps
24	GTD	44	(United States) GRT Magnus Racing	(United States) Andy Lally (United States) John Potter (United States) Spencer Pumpelly	Lamborghini 5.2 L V10	319	+29 Laps
25	GTD	48	(United States) Paul Miller Racing	(United States) Corey Lewis (United States) Bryan Sellers (United States) Madison Snow	Lamborghini Huracán GT3 Evo	318	+30 Laps
25	GTD	48	(United States) Paul Miller Racing	(United States) Corey Lewis (United States) Bryan Sellers (United States) Madison Snow	Lamborghini 5.2 L V10	318	+30 Laps
26 DNF	GTD	74	(United States) Riley Motorsports	(United States) Lawson Aschenbach (United States) Marc Miller (United States) Gar Robinson	Mercedes-AMG GT3 Evo	312	Collision damage
26 DNF	GTD	74	(United States) Riley Motorsports	(United States) Lawson Aschenbach (United States) Marc Miller (United States) Gar Robinson	Mercedes-AMG M159 6.2 L V8	312	Collision damage
27	GTLM	4	(United States) Corvette Racing	(Switzerland) Marcel Fässler (United Kingdom) Oliver Gavin (United States) Tommy Milner	Chevrolet Corvette C8.R	292	+56 Laps
27	GTLM	4	(United States) Corvette Racing	(Switzerland) Marcel Fässler (United Kingdom) Oliver Gavin (United States) Tommy Milner	Chevrolet 5.5 L V8	292	+56 Laps
28 DNF	GTD	12	(Canada) AIM Vasser Sullivan	(United States) Townsend Bell (United States) Frankie Montecalvo (United States) Michael de Quesada	Lexus RC F GT3	266	Accident damage
28 DNF	GTD	12	(Canada) AIM Vasser Sullivan	(United States) Townsend Bell (United States) Frankie Montecalvo (United States) Michael de Quesada	Lexus 5.0 L V8	266	Accident damage
29 DNF	GTD	11	(Austria) GRT Grasser Racing Team	(United States) Richard Heistand (France) Franck Perera (Netherlands) Steijn Schothorst	Lamborghini Huracán GT3 Evo	263	Driveshaft
29 DNF	GTD	11	(Austria) GRT Grasser Racing Team	(United States) Richard Heistand (France) Franck Perera (Netherlands) Steijn Schothorst	Lamborghini 5.2 L V10	263	Driveshaft
30 DNF	GTD	96	(United States) Turner Motorsport	(United States) Robby Foley (United States) Dillon Machavern (United Kingdom) Nick Yelloly	BMW M6 GT3	235	Brakes
30 DNF	GTD	96	(United States) Turner Motorsport	(United States) Robby Foley (United States) Dillon Machavern (United Kingdom) Nick Yelloly	BMW 4.4 L Turbo V8	235	Brakes
31 DNF	GTD	14	(Canada) AIM Vasser Sullivan	(United Kingdom) Jack Hawksworth (United States) Kyle Kirkwood (United States) Aaron Telitz	Lexus RC F GT3	70	Accident
31 DNF	GTD	14	(Canada) AIM Vasser Sullivan	(United Kingdom) Jack Hawksworth (United States) Kyle Kirkwood (United States) Aaron Telitz	Lexus 5.0 L V8	70	Accident
Scources:

== Standings after the race ==
DPi Drivers' Championship standings
Pos.	+/–	Driver	Points
1		(Brazil) Helio Castroneves (United States) Ricky Taylor	265
2		(Australia) Ryan Briscoe (Netherlands) Renger van der Zande	264
3	1	(United States) Jonathan Bomarito (United Kingdom) Harry Tincknell	260
4	1	(Brazil) Pipo Derani	258
5		(France) Sébastien Bourdais	249

LMP2 Drivers' Championship standings
Pos.	+/–	Driver	Points
1		(United States) Patrick Kelly	196
2		(Switzerland) Simon Trummer	161
3	3	(United States) Scott Huffaker	98
4	4	(Canada) John Farano	95
5	2	(United States) Dwight Merriman (United Kingdom) Kyle Tilley	92

GTLM Drivers' Championship standings
Pos.	+/–	Driver	Points
1		(Spain) Antonio García (United States) Jordan Taylor	351
2	1	(United States) John Edwards (Finland) Jesse Krohn	319
3	1	(United Kingdom) Oliver Gavin (United States) Tommy Milner	315
4		(United States) Connor De Phillippi (Canada) Bruno Spengler	313
5		(France) Frédéric Makowiecki (United Kingdom) Nick Tandy	297

GTD Drivers' Championship standings
Pos.	+/–	Driver	Points
1		(Germany) Mario Farnbacher (United States) Matt McMurry	286
2		(United States) Ryan Hardwick (United States) Patrick Long	284
3		(United States) Aaron Telitz	267
4		(United Kingdom) Jack Hawksworth	265
5		(United States) Robby Foley	256

- Note: Only the top five positions are included for all sets of standings.

DPi Teams' Championship standings
Pos.	+/–	Team	Points
1		(United States) #7 Acura Team Penske	265
2		(United States) #10 Konica Minolta Cadillac DPi-V.R	264
3	1	(Canada) #55 Mazda Motorsports	260
4	1	(United States) #31 Whelen Engineering Racing	258
5		(United States) #5 Mustang Sampling Racing / JDC-Miller MotorSports	249

LMP2 Teams' Championship standings
Pos.	+/–	Team	Points
1		(United States) #52 PR1/Mathiasen Motorsports	196
2		(United States) #38 Performance Tech Motorsports	126
3	1	(United States) #8 Tower Motorsport by Starworks	95
4	1	(United States) #18 Era Motorsport	92
5		(United States) #81 DragonSpeed USA	61

GTLM Teams' Championship standings
Pos.	+/–	Team	Points
1		(United States) #3 Corvette Racing	351
2	1	(United States) #24 BMW Team RLL	319
3	1	(United States) #4 Corvette Racing	315
4		(United States) #25 BMW Team RLL	313
5		(United States) #911 Porsche GT Team	297

GTD Teams' Championship standings
Pos.	+/–	Team	Points
1		(United States) #86 Meyer Shank Racing with Curb-Agajanian	286
2		(United States) #16 Wright Motorsports	284
3		(Canada) #14 AIM Vasser Sullivan	265
4		(United States) #96 Turner Motorsport	256
5		(Canada) #12 AIM Vasser Sullivan	251

- Note: Only the top five positions are included for all sets of standings.

DPi Manufacturers' Championship standings
Pos.	+/–	Manufacturer	Points
1	1	(Japan) Acura	294
2	1	(United States) Cadillac	293
3		(Japan) Mazda	286

GTLM Manufacturers' Championship standings
Pos.	+/–	Manufacturer	Points
1		(United States) Chevrolet	366
2		(Germany) BMW	350
3		(Germany) Porsche	321
4		(Italy) Ferrari	28

GTD Manufacturers' Championship standings
Pos.	+/–	Manufacturer	Points
1		(Japan) Acura	299
2	1	(Germany) Porsche	291
3	1	(Japan) Lexus	290
4		(Germany) BMW	273
5		(Italy) Lamborghini	270

- Note: Only the top five positions are included for all sets of standings.
- Note: Bold names include the Drivers', Teams', and Manufactures' Champion respectively.

IMSA SportsCar Championship
Previous race: Hyundai Monterey Sports Car Championship	2020 season	Next race: Motul Pole Award 100; 2021 Season
