= 2019 IndyCar Grand Prix =

(United States) 2019 IndyCar Grand Prix
Race details
5th round of the 2019 IndyCar season
← Previous race	Next race →
- Road course at the Indianapolis Motor Speedway
- Date: May 11, 2019
- Official name: IndyCar Grand Prix
- Location: Indianapolis Motor Speedway
- Course: Permanent racing facility 2.439 mi / 3.925 km
- Distance: 85 laps 207.315 mi / 333.64 km

Pole position
- Driver: (Sweden) Felix Rosenqvist (Chip Ganassi Racing)
- Time: 1:08.2785

Fastest lap
- Driver: (Mexico) Patricio O'Ward (Carlin)
- Time: 1:09.7962 (on lap 4 of 85)

Podium
- First: (France) Simon Pagenaud (Team Penske)
- Second: (New Zealand) Scott Dixon (Chip Ganassi Racing)
- Third: (United Kingdom) Jack Harvey (Meyer Shank Racing with Arrow Schmidt Peterson)

Chronology
Previous	Next
2018	2020

The 2019 IndyCar Grand Prix was the fifth round of the 2019 IndyCar season. The race took place over 85 laps on the infield road course at Indianapolis Motor Speedway in Speedway, Indiana. Simon Pagenaud, who drove for Team Penske, made a late race pass on Scott Dixon to win his first race since 2017.

== Results ==
Icon	Meaning
R	Rookie
W	Past winner

=== Qualifying ===
Pos	No.	Name	Grp.	Round 1	Round 2	Firestone Fast 6
1	10	(Sweden) Felix Rosenqvist R	1	1:08.3014	1:08.0188	1:08.2785
2	9	(New Zealand) Scott Dixon	2	1:08.2483	1:08.1563	1:08.2979
3	60	(United Kingdom) Jack Harvey	1	1:08.3481	1:08.1101	1:08.3238
4	88	(United States) Colton Herta R	2	1:08.1921	1:07.8887	1:08.3743
5	20	(United Arab Emirates) Ed Jones	1	1:08.4681	1:08.1700	1:08.4609
6	12	(Australia) Will Power W	1	1:08.6030	1:08.1521	1:08.7901
7	15	(United States) Graham Rahal	2	1:08.2893	1:08.2153	
8	22	(France) Simon Pagenaud W	2	1:08.3362	1:08.2445	
9	7	(Sweden) Marcus Ericsson R	2	1:08.2677	1:08.2497	
10	18	(France) Sébastien Bourdais	1	1:08.2670	1:08.2998	
11	30	(Japan) Takuma Sato	1	1:08.0663	1:08.3300	
12	21	(United States) Spencer Pigot	2	1:08.3730	1:08.4697	
13	2	(United States) Josef Newgarden	1	1:08.6240		
14	19	(United States) Santino Ferrucci R	2	1:08.4499		
15	3	(Brazil) Helio Castroneves	1	1:08.6497		
16	28	(United States) Ryan Hunter-Reay	2	1:08.6235		
17	27	(United States) Alexander Rossi	1	1:08.6994		
18	5	(Canada) James Hinchcliffe	2	1:08.7710		
19	31	(Mexico) Patricio O'Ward R	1	1:08.7487		
20	26	(United States) Zach Veach	2	1:08.8170		
21	4	(Brazil) Matheus Leist	1	1:08.7751		
22	59	(United Kingdom) Max Chilton	2	1:08.9572		
23	98	(United States) Marco Andretti	1	1:08.8995		
24	14	(Brazil) Tony Kanaan	2	1:09.1230		
OFFICIAL BOX SCORE

=== Race ===
Pos	No.	Driver	Team	Engine	Laps	Time/Retired	Pit Stops	Grid	Laps Led	Pts.
1	22	(France) Simon Pagenaud W	Team Penske	Chevrolet	85	2:00:28.1166	3	8	5	51
2	9	(New Zealand) Scott Dixon	Chip Ganassi Racing	Honda	85	+2.0469	3	2	39	43
3	60	(United Kingdom) Jack Harvey	Meyer Shank Racing with Arrow Schmidt Peterson	Honda	85	+3.7683	3	3		35
4	4	(Brazil) Matheus Leist	A.J. Foyt Enterprises	Chevrolet	85	+5.4378	3	21		32
5	21	(United States) Spencer Pigot	Ed Carpenter Racing	Chevrolet	85	+6.0938	3	12		30
6	20	(United Arab Emirates) Ed Jones	Ed Carpenter Racing Scuderia Corsa	Chevrolet	85	+7.1027	3	5		28
7	12	(Australia) Will Power W	Team Penske	Chevrolet	85	+7.5853	3	6		26
8	10	(Sweden) Felix Rosenqvist R	Chip Ganassi Racing	Honda	85	+8.7080	4	1	15	26
9	15	(United States) Graham Rahal	Rahal Letterman Lanigan Racing	Honda	85	+9.1802	3	7	4	23
10	19	(United States) Santino Ferrucci R	Dale Coyne Racing	Honda	85	+12.7201	3	14		20
11	18	(France) Sébastien Bourdais	Dale Coyne Racing with Vasser-Sullivan	Honda	85	+16.6131	4	10	2	20
12	26	(United States) Zach Veach	Andretti Autosport	Honda	85	+19.6145	4	20		18
13	98	(United States) Marco Andretti	Andretti Herta Autosport w/ Marco Andretti & Curb-Agajanian	Honda	85	+26.9994	4	23		17
14	30	(Japan) Takuma Sato	Rahal Letterman Lanigan Racing	Honda	85	+28.0345	4	11		16
15	2	(United States) Josef Newgarden	Team Penske	Chevrolet	85	+28.4598	4	13	20	16
16	5	(Canada) James Hinchcliffe	Arrow Schmidt Peterson Motorsports	Honda	85	+28.6403	5	18		14
17	28	(United States) Ryan Hunter-Reay	Andretti Autosport	Honda	85	+29.1217	4	16		13
18	59	(United Kingdom) Max Chilton	Carlin	Chevrolet	85	+32.0458	4	22		12
19	31	(Mexico) Patricio O'Ward R	Carlin	Chevrolet	85	+1:12.0400	7	19		11
20	14	(Brazil) Tony Kanaan	A.J. Foyt Enterprises	Chevrolet	83	+2 Laps	4	24		10
21	3	(Brazil) Helio Castroneves	Team Penske	Chevrolet	83	+2 Laps	4	15		9
22	27	(United States) Alexander Rossi	Andretti Autosport	Honda	81	+4 Laps	3	17		8
23	88	(United States) Colton Herta R	Harding Steinbrenner Racing	Honda	15	Contact	0	4		7
24	7	(Sweden) Marcus Ericsson R	Arrow Schmidt Peterson Motorsports	Honda	11	Contact	0	9		6
OFFICIAL BOX SCORE

Notes: ^{1} Points include 1 point for leading at least 1 lap during a race, an additional 2 points for leading the most race laps, and 1 point for Pole Position.

== Championship standings after the race ==
Drivers' Championship standings

	Pos	Driver	Points
	1	(United States) Josef Newgarden	182
1	2	(New Zealand) Scott Dixon	176
1	3	(United States) Alexander Rossi	146
7	4	(France) Simon Pagenaud	138
1	5	(Japan) Takuma Sato	132

Manufacturer standings

Pos	Manufacturer	Points
1	(Japan) Honda	416
2	(United States) Chevrolet	368

- Note: Only the top five positions are included.

Previous race: 2019 Acura Grand Prix of Long Beach	IndyCar Series; 2019 season	Next race: 2019 Indianapolis 500
Previous race: 2018 IndyCar Grand Prix	INDYCAR Grand Prix (Month of May)	Next race: 2021 GMR Grand Prix; No May race in 2020.
