= Matheus Leist =

Brazilian racing driver (born 1998)

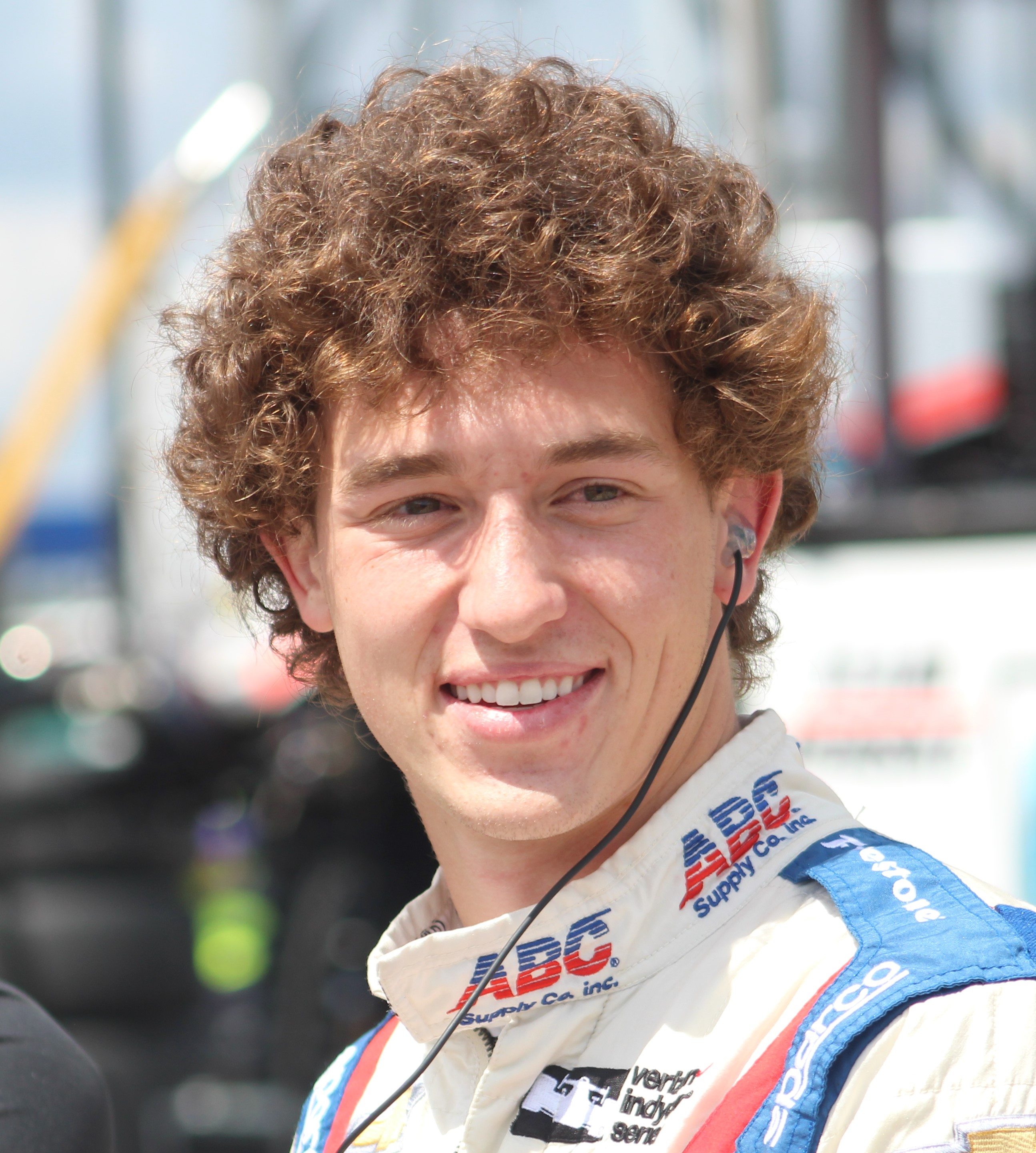
- Leist at the 2018 ABC Supply 500
- Nationality: Brazil
- Born: Matheus Tobias Leist; 8 September 1998 (age 28) Novo Hamburgo, Brazil
- Relatives: Arthur Leist (brother)

WeatherTech SportsCar Championship career
- Debut season: 2020
- Current team: JDC-Miller MotorSports
- Categorisation: FIA Gold
- Starts: 5
- Wins: 0
- Poles: 0
- Best finish: 11th in 2020

Previous series
- 2018–2019 2017 2016 2015-16 2015 2014: IndyCar Series; Indy Lights; BRDC British Formula 3 Championship; MRF Challenge; MSA Formula; Brazilian Formula Three Championship

Championship titles
- 2016: BRDC British Formula 3 Championship

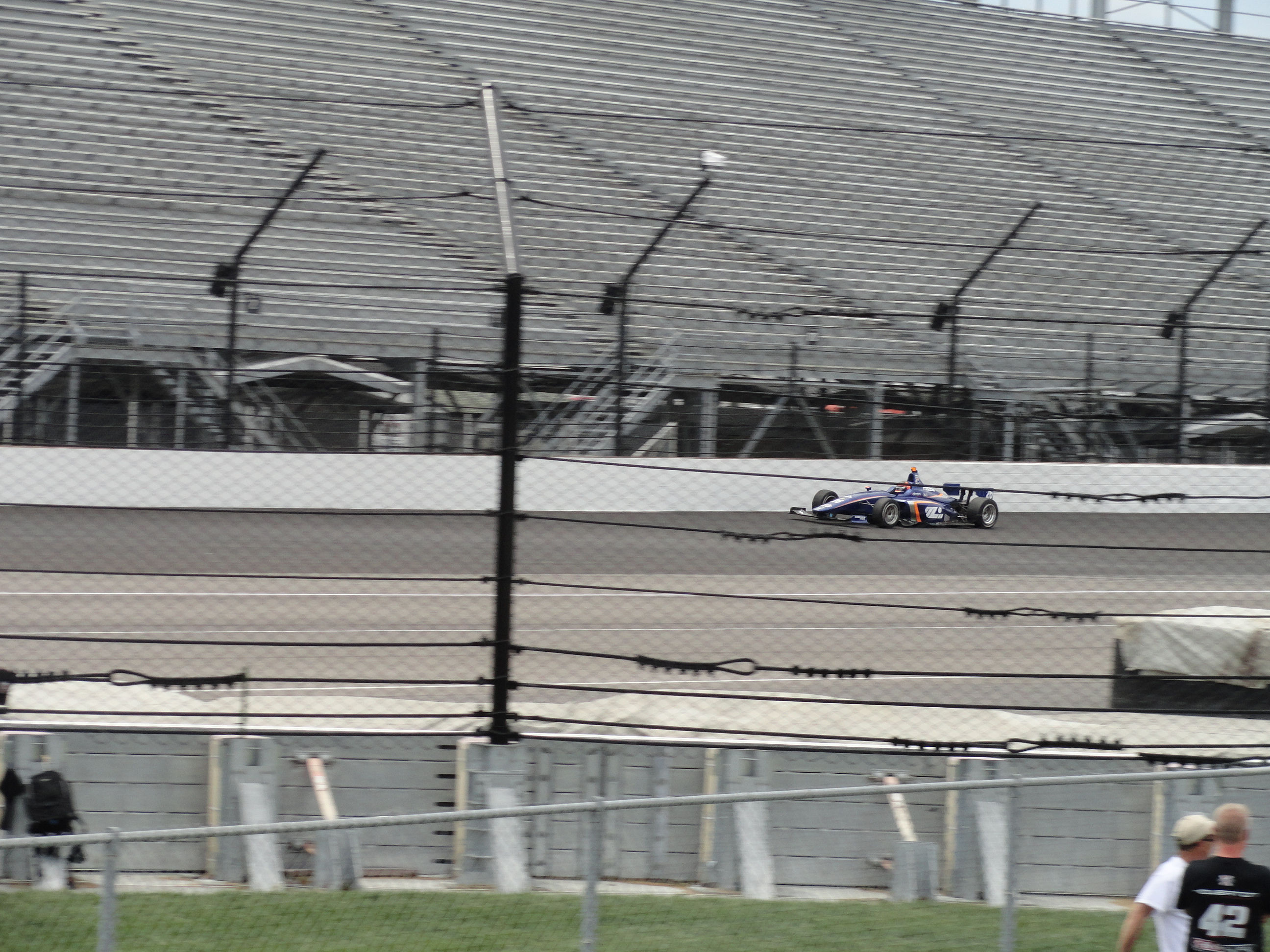
Matheus Leist, winner of the 2017 Freedom 100

Matheus Tobias Leist (born September 8, 1998) is a Brazilian racing driver who last raced for JDC-Miller MotorSports in the WeatherTech SportsCar Championship. He has previously competed in the IndyCar Series, the BRDC British Formula 3 Championship, and Indy Lights.

== Career ==
=== Karting ===
Leist began karting in 2009 at the age of eleven. In 2013, he finished as runner-up in the Petrobras Karting Championship.

=== Lower formulas ===
In 2014, Leist graduated to single-seaters, racing in the B class of the Brazilian F3 Championship, finishing runner-up to Vitor Baptista.

The following year, Leist switched to MSA Formula in Britain with Double R Racing. He scored two victories and finished fifth in the standings.

=== British F3 ===
In 2016, Leist reunited with Double R Racing and graduated to BRDC British F3. Scoring four wins, two poles and six fastest laps, Leist took the title at the final round after a close fight with Ricky Collard throughout the season.

=== GP3 Series ===
In November 2016, it was announced Leist would partake in the GP3 post-season test at Yas Marina with ART Grand Prix, Arden International and Trident Racing.

=== Indy Lights ===
In February 2017, Leist signed with Carlin for the Indy Lights Championship. During his first season, Leist picked up his first podium at the Grand Prix of Indianapolis before taking pole and winning the Freedom 100 less than two weeks later, having led from start to finish.

=== IndyCar Series ===
In November 2017, A.J. Foyt Enterprises announced that the team hired Leist to drive the No. 4 Chevrolet in 2018. Leist partners veteran Brazilian driver Tony Kanaan and made his IndyCar debut at the Firestone Grand Prix of St. Petersburg on March 11, 2018. Leist completed two full seasons of IndyCar with Foyt, with a best finish of fourth at the 2019 IndyCar Grand Prix. He was replaced at Foyt with Charlie Kimball for 2020.

=== IMSA ===
Leist joined JDC–Miller MotorSports for the Endurance Cup rounds of the 2020 IMSA SportsCar Championship plus the Laguna Seca round. Following a best finish of fourth in the season-ending 12 Hours of Sebring, JDC-Miller downsized to one car for the 2021 season leaving Leist without a drive.

== Personal life ==
Leist's younger brother Arthur is also a racing driver, currently competing in Stock Car Brasil.

== Racing record ==
=== Career summary ===
Season	Series	Team	Races	Wins	Poles	F/Laps	Podiums	Points	Position
2014	Fórmula 3 Brasil - Class B	Hitech Racing	16	2	0	0	9	115	**2nd**
2015	MSA Formula Championship	Double R Racing	30	2	1	1	7	273	5th
2015	FIA Formula 3 European Championship	Double R Racing	3	0	0	0	0	0	41st
2015-16	MRF Challenge Formula 2000	MRF Racing	2	0	0	0	0	20	14th
2016	BRDC British Formula 3 Championship	Double R Racing	24	4	2	6	11	493	**1st**
2017	Indy Lights	Carlin	16	3	2	1	4	279	4th
2018	IndyCar Series	A. J. Foyt Enterprises	17	0	0	0	0	253	18th
2019	IndyCar Series	A. J. Foyt Enterprises	17	0	0	0	0	261	19th
2020	IMSA Sports Car Championship - DPi	JDC-Miller MotorSports	5	0	0	0	0	123	11th
2021	Ferrari Challenge North America - Trofeo Pirelli (Pro)		6	0	0	0	6	72	**3rd**
2024	GT4 America Series - Pro-Am	RENNtech Motorsport	13	2	2	1	4	130	4th
2025	GT4 America Series - Pro-Am	NolaSport	5	0	1	0	0	39	7th
2025	Porsche Carrera Cup North America	NOLASPORT	14	0	0	0	0	87	10th
2026	Michelin Pilot Challenge - GS	VPX Motorsports	2	0	0	0	0	390	43rd
2026	GT4 America Series - Pro-Am	NOLASport	13	1	1	1	7	170	**3rd**

=== Complete Fórmula 3 Brasil results ===
(key) (Races in bold indicate pole position) (Races in italics indicate fastest lap)

Year	Team	Class	1	2	3	4	5	6	7	8	9	10	11	12	13	14	15	16	Rank	Points
2014	Hitech Racing	Class B	TAR; 1; 7	TAR; 2 Ret	SCS; 1; 5	SCS; 2 Ret	BRA; 1 Ret	BRA; 2 Ret											2nd	115
2014	Cesário F3	Class B							INT; 1; 7	INT; 2; 7	CUR1; 1; 3	CUR1; 2; 3	**VEL**; **1**; 3	VEL; 2 Ret	**CUR2**; **1**; 9	CUR2; 2; 5	GOI; 1; 4	GOI; 2 Ret	2nd	115

=== Complete MSA Formula Championship results ===
(key) (Races in bold indicate pole position) (Races in italics indicate fastest lap)

Year	Team	1	2	3	4	5	6	7	8	9	10	11	12	13	14	15	16	17	18	19	20	21	22	23	24	25	26	27	28	29	30	DC	Points
2015	Double R Racing	BHI; 1; 3	BHI; 2; 8	BHI; 3; 3	DON; 1; 7	DON; 2; 1	DON; 3 Ret	THR; 1; 2	THR; 2; 5	THR; 3; 4	OUL; 1; 5	OUL; 2; 2	OUL; 3 DSQ	CRO; 1; 5	CRO; 2; 5	CRO; 3; 6	SNE; 1; 7	SNE; 2 Ret	SNE; 3 DNS	KNO; 1; 9	KNO; 2; 6	KNO; 3; 11	ROC; 1; 5	ROC; 2; 4	ROC; 3; 6	**SIL**; **1**; 4	SIL; 2; 3	SIL; 3; 1	BHGP; 1 Ret	BHGP; 2; 14	BHGP; 3; 7	5th	273

=== Complete FIA Formula 3 European Championship results ===
(key) (Races in bold indicate pole position) (Races in italics indicate fastest lap)

Year	Team	1	2	3	4	5	6	7	8	9	10	11	12	13	14	15	16	17	18	19	20	21	22	23	24	25	26	27	28	29	30	31	32	33	DC	Points
2015	Double R Racing	SIL; 1	SIL; 2	SIL; 3	HOC; 1	HOC; 2	HOC; 3	PAU; 1	PAU; 2	PAU; 3	MNZ; 1	MNZ; 2	MNZ; 3	SPA; 1	SPA; 2	SPA; 3	NOR; 1	NOR; 2	NOR; 3	ZAN; 1	ZAN; 2	ZAN; 3	RBR; 1; 27	RBR; 2; 24	RBR; 3; 27	ALG; 1	ALG; 2	ALG; 3	NÜR; 1	NÜR; 2	NÜR; 3	HOC; 1	HOC; 2	HOC; 3	41st	0

=== Complete MRF Challenge Formula 2000 Championship results ===
(key) (Races in bold indicate pole position) (Races in italics indicate fastest lap)

Year	1	2	3	4	5	6	7	8	9	10	11	12	13	14	DC	Points
2015-16	ABU; 1	ABU; 2	ABU; 3	ABU; 4	BHR; 1; 5	BHR; 2; 5	DUB; 1	DUB; 2	DUB; 3	DUB; 4	CHE; 1	CHE; 2	CHE; 3	CHE; 4	14th	20

=== Complete BRDC British Formula 3 Championship results ===
(key) (Races in bold indicate pole position) (Races in italics indicate fastest lap)

Year	Team	1	2	3	4	5	6	7	8	9	10	11	12	13	14	15	16	17	18	19	20	21	22	23	24	DC	Points
2016	Double R Racing	SNE1; 1; 10	SNE1; 2; 1	SNE1; 3; 4	**BRH**; **1**; 1	BRH; 2 Ret	BRH; 3 Ret	ROC; 1; 3	ROC; 2; 4	ROC; 3; 2	OUL; 1; 4	OUL; 2; 4	OUL; 3; 5	SIL; 1; 1	SIL; 2; 3	SIL; 3 C	SPA; 1; 2	SPA; 2; 5	SPA; 3; 2	SNE2; 1; 2	SNE2; 2; 6	SNE2; 3; 2	DON; 1; 1	DON; 2; 5	DON; 3; 5	1st	493

=== American open-wheel racing ===
(key) (Races in bold indicate pole position; races in italics indicate fastest lap)

==== Indy Lights ====
Year	Team	1	2	3	4	5	6	7	8	9	10	11	12	13	14	15	16	Rank	Points
2017	Carlin	STP; 15	STP; 11	ALA; 4	ALA; 7	IMS; 5	IMS; 3	**INDY**; 1	**RDA**; 1	RDA; 4	IOW; 1	TOR; 13	TOR; 5	MOH; 11	MOH; 10	GMP; 10	WGL; 4	4th	279

==== IndyCar Series ====
(key)

Year	Team	Chassis	No.	Engine	1	2	3	4	5	6	7	8	9	10	11	12	13	14	15	16	17	Rank	Points	Ref
2018	A. J. Foyt Enterprises	Dallara DW12	4	Chevrolet	STP; 24	PHX; 19	LBH; 14	ALA; 12	IMS; 21	INDY; 13	DET; 15	DET; 14	TXS; 22	RDA; 15	IOW; 22	TOR; 15	MOH; 19	POC; 11	GTW; 16	POR; 14	SNM; 19	18th	253	
2019	A. J. Foyt Enterprises	Dallara DW12	4	Chevrolet	STP; 22	COA; 17	ALA; 20	LBH; 15	IMS; 4	INDY; 15	DET; 21	DET; 20	TXS; 22	RDA; 20	TOR; 19	IOW; 16	MOH; 18	POC; 14	GTW; 17	POR; 8	LAG; 17	19th	261	

* Season still in progress.

==== Indianapolis 500 ====
Year	Chassis	Engine	Start	Finish	Team
2018	Dallara	Chevrolet	11	13	A. J. Foyt Enterprises
2019	Dallara	Chevrolet	24	15	A. J. Foyt Enterprises

=== WeatherTech SportsCar Championship results ===
(key) (Races in bold indicate pole position; results in italics indicate fastest lap)

Year	Team	Class	Chassis	Engine	1	2	3	4	5	6	7	8	9	Rank	Points
2020	JDC-Miller MotorSports	DPi	Cadillac DPi-V.R	Cadillac 5.5 L V8	DAY; 5	DAY	SEB	ELK	ATL; 8	MOH	PET; 8	LGA; 8	SEB; 4	11th	123

Sporting positions
Preceded by Will Palmer (British F4 champion)	BRDC British Formula 3 Championship; Champion; 2016	Succeeded by Enaam Ahmed
