= 2019 Firestone Grand Prix of St. Petersburg =

(United States) 2019 St. Petersburg
Race details
1st round of the 2019 IndyCar season
Next race →
- Date: March 10, 2019
- Official name: Firestone Grand Prix of St. Petersburg
- Location: Streets of St. Petersburg
- Course: Temporary street circuit 1.800 mi / 2.897 km
- Distance: 110 laps 198.000 mi / 318.670 km

Pole position
- Driver: (Australia) Will Power (Team Penske)
- Time: 1:00.4594

Fastest lap
- Driver: (United States) Josef Newgarden (Team Penske)
- Time: 1:01.7350 (on lap 52 of 110)

Podium
- First: (United States) Josef Newgarden (Team Penske)
- Second: (New Zealand) Scott Dixon (Chip Ganassi Racing)
- Third: (Australia) Will Power (Team Penske)

Chronology
Previous	Next
2018	2020

The 2019 Firestone Grand Prix of St. Petersburg was the 1st round of the 2019 IndyCar season. The race was held on March 10, 2019, in St. Petersburg, Florida. Will Power qualified on pole position, while Josef Newgarden took victory in the 110-lap race.

== Results ==
Key	Meaning
R	Rookie
W	Past winner

=== Qualifying ===
Pos	No.	Name	Grp.	Round 1	Round 2	Firestone Fast 6
1	12	(Australia) Will Power W	2	1:00.6828	1:00.3011	1:00.4594
2	2	(United States) Josef Newgarden	1	1:04.2860	1:00.2003	1:00.5570
3	10	(Sweden) Felix Rosenqvist R	1	1:03.8696	1:00.8100	1:00.6884
4	9	(New Zealand) Scott Dixon	2	1:00.8373	1:00.5370	1:00.8544
5	28	(United States) Ryan Hunter-Reay	2	1:00.1548	1:00.4135	1:01.0784
6	27	(United States) Alexander Rossi	1	1:03.2100	1:00.7086	1:01.7739
7	60	(United Kingdom) Jack Harvey	2	1:00.7970	1:00.9531	
8	23	(United States) Charlie Kimball	1	1:02.9944	1:01.0146	
9	5	(Canada) James Hinchcliffe W	1	1:03.1731	1:01.0185	
10	15	(United States) Graham Rahal W	2	1:00.5933	1:01.0944	
11	88	(United States) Colton Herta R	2	1:00.4618	1:01.4182	
12	81	(United Kingdom) Ben Hanley R	1	1:04.1477	1:02.3703	
13	22	(France) Simon Pagenaud	1	1:04.6298		
14	26	(United States) Zach Veach	2	1:00.9061		
15	20	(United Arab Emirates) Ed Jones	1	1:06.1422		
16	21	(United States) Spencer Pigot	2	1:00.9495		
17	98	(United States) Marco Andretti	1	No time		
18	7	(Sweden) Marcus Ericsson R	2	1:01.1345		
19	18	(France) Sébastien Bourdais W	1	No time		
20	30	(Japan) Takuma Sato	2	1:01.1511		
21	14	(Brazil) Tony Kanaan	1	No time		
22	4	(Brazil) Matheus Leist	2	1:01.1579		
23	19	(United States) Santino Ferrucci R	1	No time		
24	59	(United Kingdom) Max Chilton	2	1:01.3785		

=== Race ===
Pos	No.	Driver	Team	Engine	Laps	Time/Retired	Pit Stops	Grid	Laps Led	Pts.
1	2	(United States) Josef Newgarden	Team Penske	Chevrolet	110	2:04:18.2588	3	2	60	53
2	9	(New Zealand) Scott Dixon	Chip Ganassi Racing	Honda	110	+2.8998	3	4		40
3	12	(Australia) Will Power W	Team Penske	Chevrolet	110	+12.7442	3	1	17	37
4	10	(Sweden) Felix Rosenqvist R	Chip Ganassi Racing	Honda	110	+14.5858	3	3	31	33
5	27	(United States) Alexander Rossi	Andretti Autosport	Honda	110	+18.3616	3	6	2	31
6	5	(Canada) James Hinchcliffe W	Arrow Schmidt Peterson Motorsports	Honda	110	+31.1596	3	9		28
7	22	(France) Simon Pagenaud	Team Penske	Chevrolet	110	+31.4401	3	13		26
8	88	(United States) Colton Herta R	Harding Steinbrenner Racing	Honda	110	+40.4700	3	11		24
9	19	(United States) Santino Ferrucci R	Dale Coyne Racing	Honda	110	+57.6029	3	23		22
10	60	(United Kingdom) Jack Harvey	Meyer Shank Racing with Arrow Schmidt Peterson	Honda	110	+59.1909	3	7		20
11	21	(United States) Spencer Pigot	Ed Carpenter Racing	Chevrolet	110	+1:02.6866	4	16		19
12	15	(United States) Graham Rahal W	Rahal Letterman Lanigan Racing	Honda	109	+1 Lap	4	10		18
13	98	(United States) Marco Andretti	Andretti Herta Autosport w/ Marco Andretti & Curb-Agajanian	Honda	109	+1 Lap	4	17		17
14	26	(United States) Zach Veach	Andretti Autosport	Honda	109	+1 Lap	3	14		16
15	14	(Brazil) Tony Kanaan	A. J. Foyt Enterprises	Chevrolet	109	+1 Lap	3	21		15
16	59	(United Kingdom) Max Chilton	Carlin Racing	Chevrolet	109	+1 Lap	4	24		14
17	23	(United States) Charlie Kimball	Carlin Racing	Chevrolet	109	+1 Lap	4	8		13
18	81	(United Kingdom) Ben Hanley R	DragonSpeed	Chevrolet	108	+2 Laps	5	12		12
19	30	(Japan) Takuma Sato	Rahal Letterman Lanigan Racing	Honda	75	Gearbox	2	20		11
20	7	(Sweden) Marcus Ericsson R	Arrow Schmidt Peterson Motorsports	Honda	54	Water pressure	2	18		10
21	20	(United Arab Emirates) Ed Jones	Ed Carpenter Racing Scuderia Corsa	Chevrolet	25	Crash T9	1	15		9
22	4	(Brazil) Matheus Leist	A. J. Foyt Enterprises	Chevrolet	25	Crash T9	1	22		8
23	28	(United States) Ryan Hunter-Reay	Andretti Autosport	Honda	19	Engine	1	5		7
24	18	(France) Sébastien Bourdais W	Dale Coyne Racing with Vasser-Sullivan	Honda	11	Engine	1	19		6

Notes: ^{1} Points include 1 point for leading at least 1 lap during a race, an additional 2 points for leading the most race laps, and 1 point for Pole Position.

== Championship standings after the race ==
Drivers' Championship standings

Pos	Driver	Points
1	(United States) Josef Newgarden	53
2	(New Zealand) Scott Dixon	40
3	(Australia) Will Power	37
4	(Sweden) Felix Rosenqvist	33
5	(United States) Alexander Rossi	31

Manufacturer standings

Pos	Manufacturer	Points
1	(United States) Chevrolet	91
2	(Japan) Honda	72

- Note: Only the top five positions are included.

Previous race: None	IndyCar Series; 2019 season	Next race: 2019 IndyCar Classic
Previous race: 2018 Firestone Grand Prix of St. Petersburg	Firestone Grand Prix of St. Petersburg	Next race: 2020 Firestone Grand Prix of St. Petersburg
