= Felix Rosenqvist =

Swedish racing driver (born 1991)

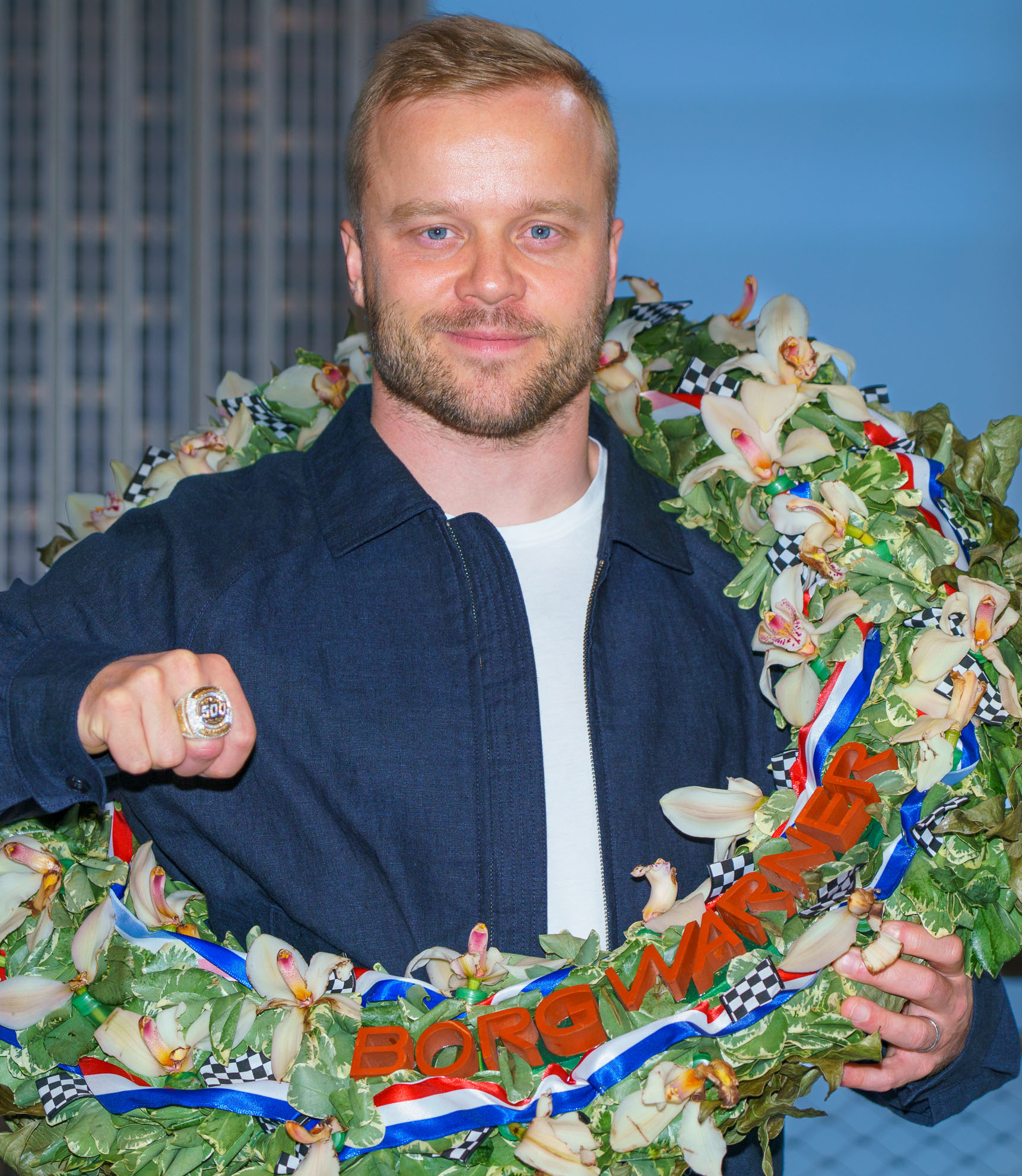
- Rosenqvist in 2026
- Nationality: (Sweden) Swedish
- Born: Karl Felix Helmer Rosenqvist; 7 November 1991 (age 35); Värnamo, Sweden

IndyCar Series career
- 126 races run over 8 years
- Team: No. 7 (Arrow McLaren)
- Best finish: 6th (2019, 2025)
- First race: 2019 Grand Prix of St. Petersburg (St. Petersburg)
- Last race: 2026 Mission Grand Prix of Monterey (Laguna Seca)
- First win: 2020 REV Group Grand Prix, Race 2 (Road America)
- Last win: 2026 Indianapolis 500 (Indianapolis)
Wins	Podiums	Poles
2	11	8

Formula E career
- Debut season: 2016–17
- Categorisation: FIA Gold
- Car number: 94
- Former teams: Mahindra Racing
- Starts: 25
- Championships: 0
- Wins: 3
- Podiums: 7
- Poles: 6
- Fastest laps: 3

Previous series
- 2016 2012–2015 2011–12 2010 2009 2009 2008 2007–08: DTM; European Formula 3 Formula 3 Euro Series; German Formula Three; Formula Renault 2.0 NEZ; Formula Renault 2.0 Sweden; Formula Asia 2.0; Asian Formula Renault

Championship titles
- 2015 2009 2009 2008: European Formula 3 Championship; Formula Renault 2.0 NEZ; Formula Renault 2.0 Sweden; Formula Asia 2.0

Super Formula career
- Debut season: 2017
- Car number: 7
- Former teams: SUNOCO Team LeMans
- Starts: 7
- Wins: 1
- Poles: 0
- Fastest laps: 2
- Statistics up to date as of 9 August 2026.

Karl Felix Helmer Rosenqvist (born 7 November 1991) is a Swedish professional racing driver who currently drives the No. 7 Chevrolet for Arrow McLaren in the IndyCar Series. He was named the 2019 IndyCar Rookie of the Year and won the 2026 Indianapolis 500.

== Racing career ==
=== Formula Renault ===
Rosenqvist started his single-seater career in Asia, where he won the Formula Renault 2.0 Asia in 2008, and the Formula Renault 2.0 Sweden/NEZ title in 2009.

=== German Formula 3 Championship ===
In 2010, Rosenqvist was fifth in the German Formula Three Championship with two victories, eight podiums, and one pole position. He also qualified seventh in his debut, with the same Swedish/British racing team Performance Racing, finishing ninth in the 2010 Macau Grand Prix Formula Three.

=== European Formula 3 Championship ===
In 2011, Rosenqvist graduated to the Formula 3 Euro Series, with the Mücke Motorsport team, where he finished his rookie year fifth, with one win, ten podiums, and five fastest laps, and won the Masters of Formula 3.

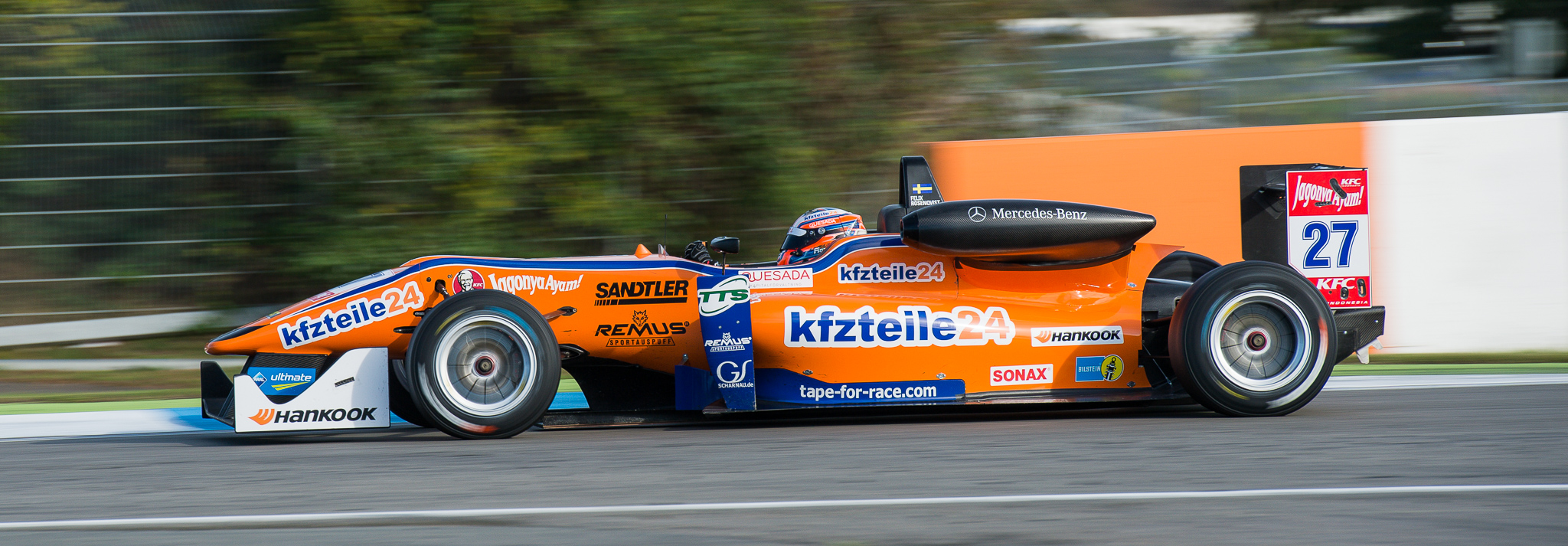
Rosenqvist driving at Hockenheim in European Formula 3.

In 2012, Rosenqvist finished third in the 2012 European Formula 3 Championship and finished second in Macau Grand Prix.

The year after, Rosenqvist narrowly missed out on the 2013 European Formula 3 Championship title to Raffaele Marciello, however, he won for a second time from the pole position, the Masters of Formula 3. he started the race from the front row, but collided with Raffaele Marciello and Pipo Derani to retire from the race in the first lap, in the Macau Grand Prix 2013.

In his fourth year with Mücke Motorsport, Rosenqvist finished eighth in the 2014 European Formula 3 Championship. He ended 2014 with a win from pole position ahead of teammate Lucas Auer in the Macau Grand Prix.

In 2015, Rosenqvist switched to Prema Powerteam, claiming the 2015 European Formula 3 Championship title with 13 victories, 24 podiums, and 17 pole positions. He would also take his second consecutive victory, again from pole position, in the 2015 Macau Grand Prix. His extended Formula 3 career meant that he would become the most successful Formula 3 racer of all time.

=== Indy Lights ===
In February 2016, Rosenqvist announced that he would compete in the 2016 Indy Lights series for Belardi Auto Racing as he failed to bring the budget for a continued programme in GP2 Series with Prema Powerteam. Rosenqvist had a reduced programme in the series, competing in only ten of the eighteen races, as he later in the season would have clashing commitments with his sportscar programme with Mercedes-Benz in Europe. He scored three wins in his campaign. He had a successful test in IndyCar with Chip Ganassi Racing at Mid-Ohio Sports Car Course, saying he would be happy to return to the American racing scene later in his career.

=== GT Racing ===
Rosenqvist joined the 2016 Blancpain GT Series Sprint Cup together with French Tristan Vautier, driving a Mercedes-AMG GT3 for AKKA-ASP Team, where they together scored one victory, three podiums out of the ten races and finished seventh in the overall standings. The same duo together with Renger van der Zande lined up for the classic 2016 24 Hours of Spa where they reached second place.

=== DTM ===
Rosenqvist started 2016 with the role of official reserve driver, having continued his long partnership with Mercedes-Benz before being promoted to a race seat with one of the cars run by ART Grand Prix following Esteban Ocon's departure to Manor Racing in Formula One. He made an impressive debut in Moscow where he finished tenth and scored points in his first-ever race in the Deutsche Tourenwagen Masters.

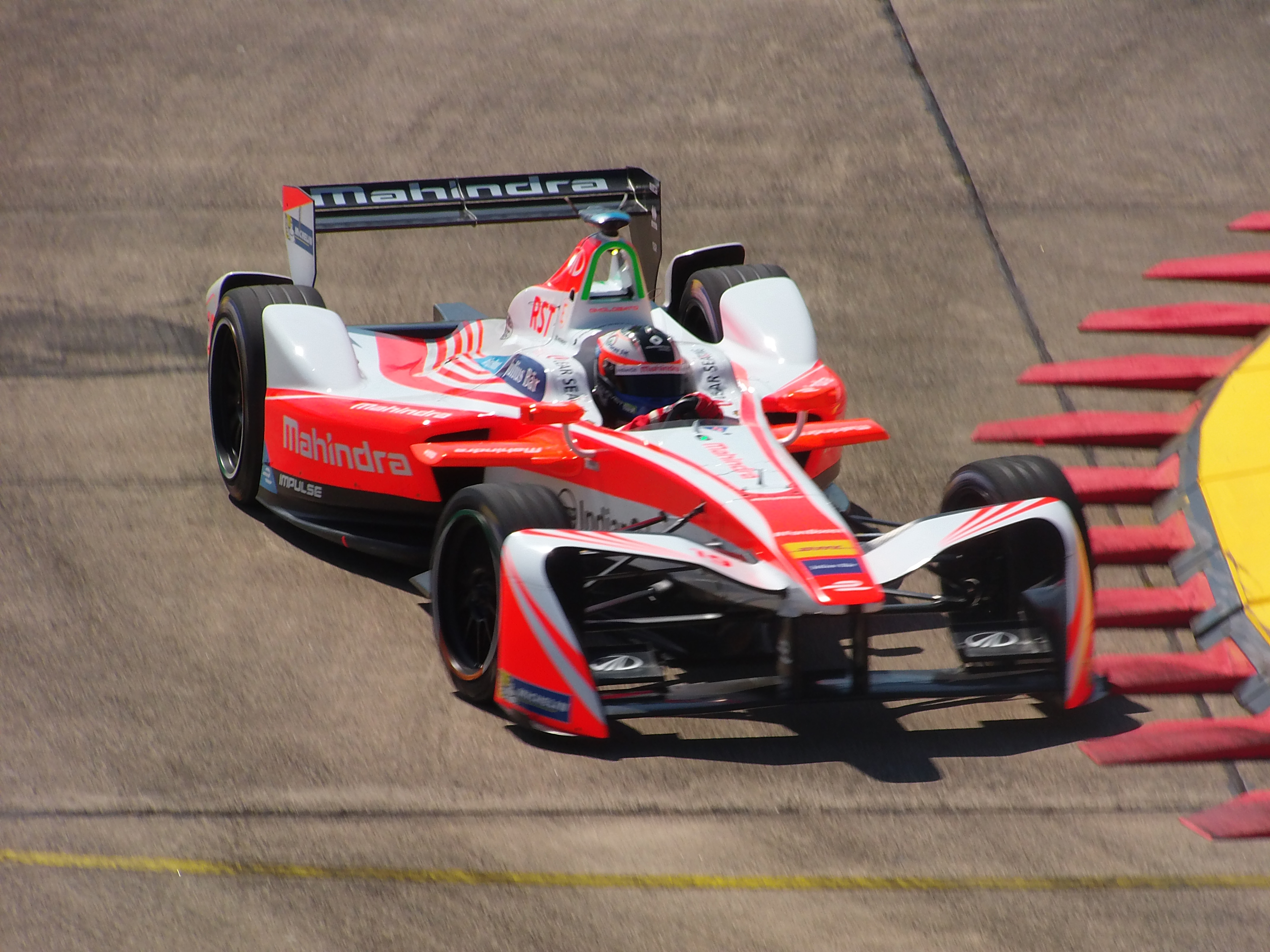
Rosenqvist driving for Mahindra Racing at the 2017 Berlin ePrix

=== Formula E ===
In August 2016, it was announced that Rosenqvist would partner with former Formula One driver Nick Heidfeld at the Mahindra Formula E team for the 2016–17 Formula E season. On 10 June 2017, he won the first race at the Berlin ePrix. It would be the first victory for him, as well as for his team. At the end of 2018, he made his last race start in Formula E before moving on to the IndyCar Series.

=== Super Formula and Super GT ===
Rosenqvist raced in the Super Formula series for the 2017 season with Team LeMans.

Rosenqvist raced in the Super GT series for the 2018 season with Team LeMans, the same team he raced in the Super Formula series the year before. He replaced Andrea Caldarelli's position in the team.

=== IndyCar Series ===
==== Chip Ganassi Racing (2019) ====
Subsequently, Rosenqvist signed with Chip Ganassi Racing for the 2019 IndyCar Series. He went on to win Rookie of the Year honors that year after finishing sixth in the championship standings. In the 2020 season, Rosenqvist won his first IndyCar race at the REV Group Grand Prix at Road America.

==== Arrow McLaren (2020–2023) ====
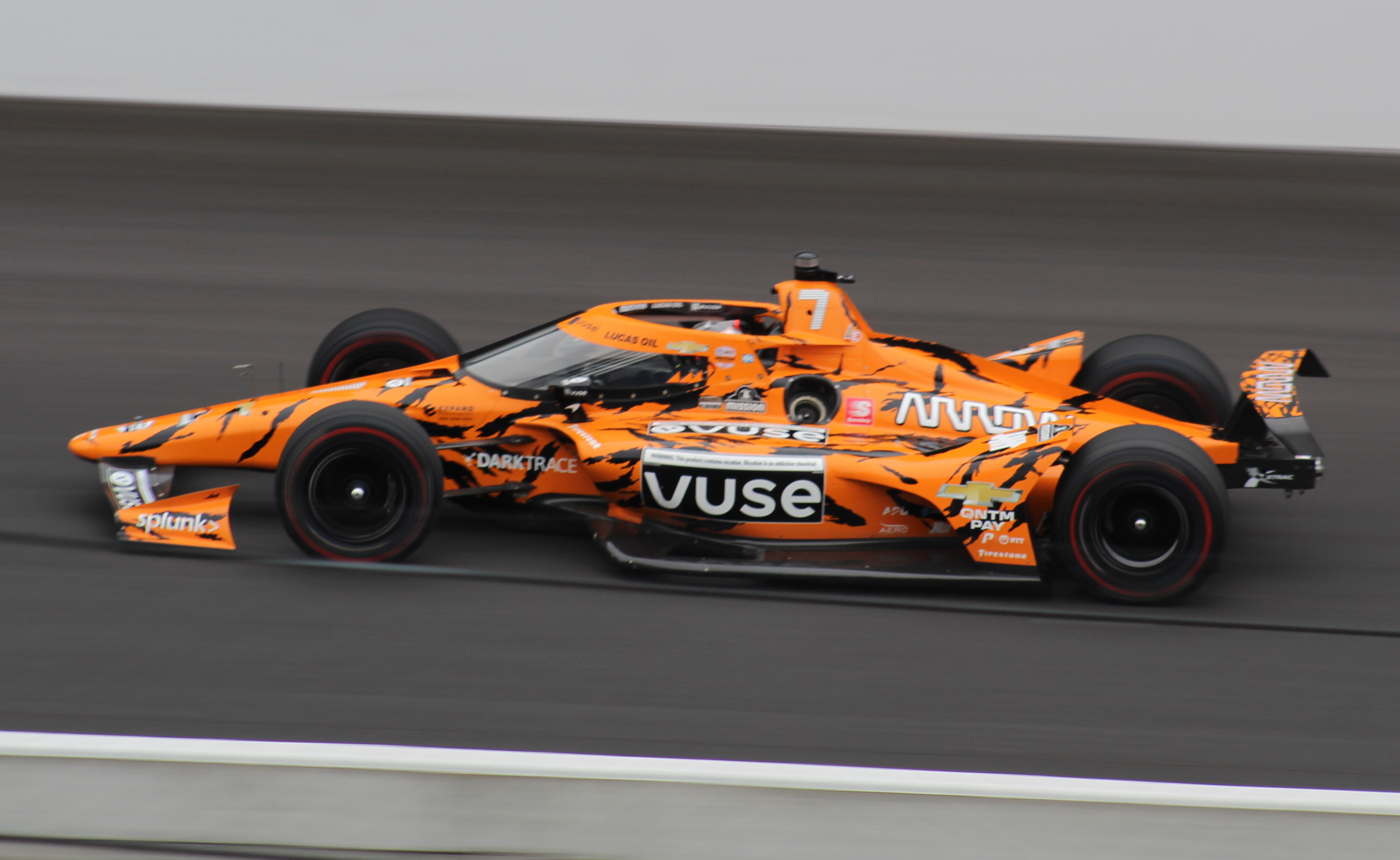
Rosenqvist driving for Arrow McLaren SP at the 2021 Indianapolis 500

On 13 October 2020, it was announced Rosenqvist would leave CGR and join Arrow McLaren SP in 2021, replacing Oliver Askew in the organization's No. 7 entry.

On 12 June 2021, in the first race at the Chevrolet Detroit Grand Prix weekend doubleheader, Rosenqvist suffered a significant crash on lap 28 as his car experienced a stuck throttle, and as a result, his car crashed hard into the wall. He did not suffer any life-threatening injuries, but was taken to a downtown Detroit hospital for further evaluation. Rosenqvist was released the following day from the hospital, but was not cleared to participate in the second Detroit race nor the following race a week later at Road America. He was replaced in those races by Oliver Askew and Kevin Magnussen, with Magnussen making his IndyCar debut.

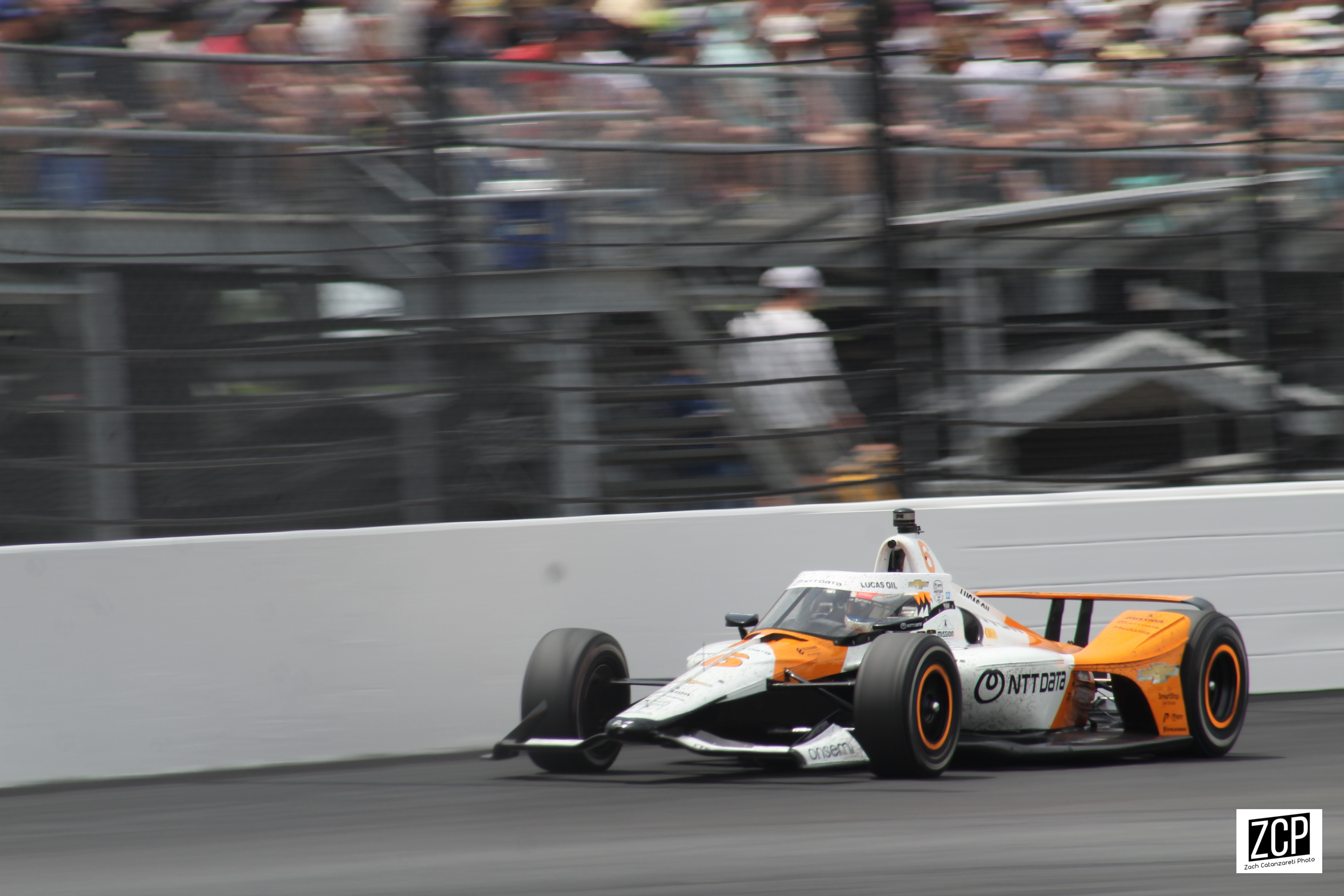
Rosenqvist during the 2023 Indianapolis 500

Rosenqvist stayed with McLaren for 2022, and picked up his first podium with the team at Toronto. It was announced in September that he would also be driving for the team in 2023. Rosenqvist picked up three pole positions on the season at Texas, the IMS Road Course, and Laguna Seca. However, he was again unable to pick up a race win for Arrow McLaren, with his best finish on the season being second at Portland.

==== Meyer Shank Racing (2024–2026) ====
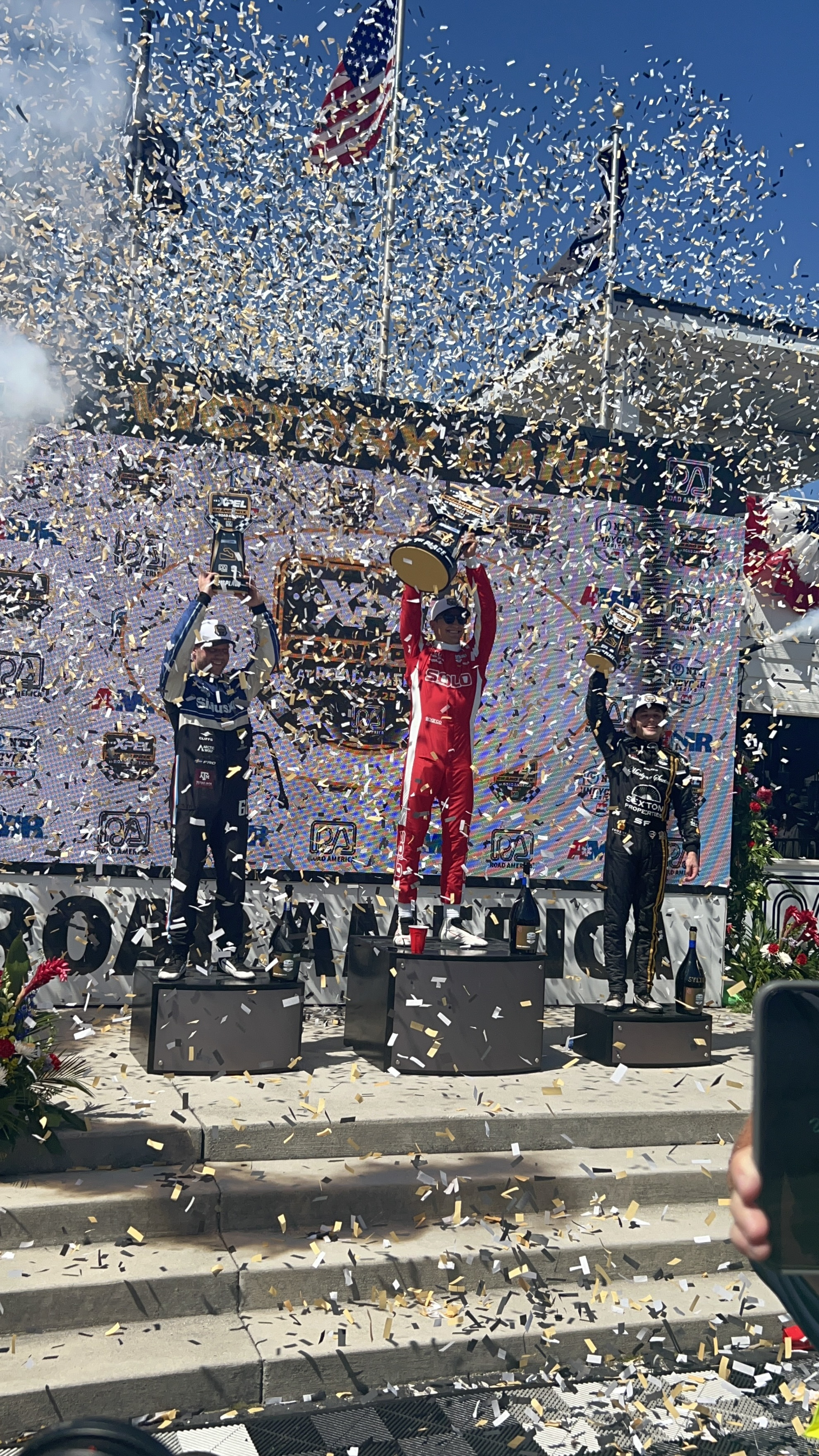
Rosenqvist celebrating at the podium at Road America

On 5 September 2023, Meyer Shank Racing (MSR) announced that Rosenqvist would drive the No. 60 Honda in a multi-year deal beginning in the 2024 season. In the early portion of the season, Rosenqvist led a significant uptick in performance at Meyer Shank Racing, starting near the front of the field at St. Petersburg and taking pole at Long Beach, the latter of which gave Meyer Shank Racing their first ever IndyCar pole position.

Rosenqvist then had a mid-season slump, including at the 2024 Indianapolis 500. He finished the season with 306 points, 12th in the standings. In 2025, he took a big step forward with MSR. He sat fourth in points after three races. At the 2025 Indianapolis 500, he qualified for the Firestone Fast Six, qualified fifth for the race, and finished fourth in the race. He then followed that up with a second at Road America after charging from 12th position, tying MSR's best non-Indy 500 result. He finished sixth in points with 372 pts.

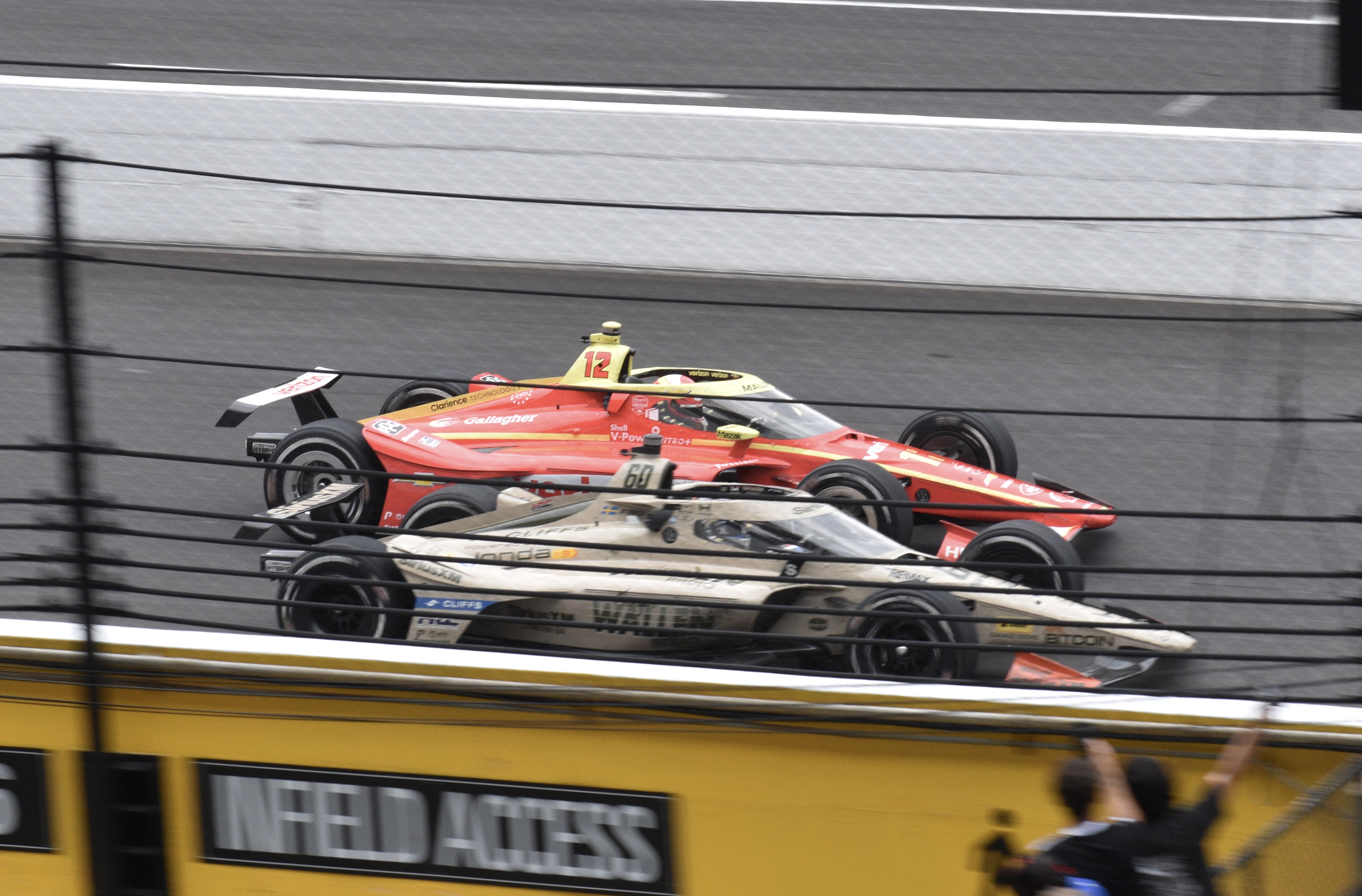
Rosenqvist passes Malukas to win the 2026 Indianapolis 500

In 2026, Rosenqvist had a rough first four races, finishing outside the top-ten in each of those races. Nonetheless, he earned the pole position at Long Beach and earned a podium finish. Rosenqvist started the month of May with a 23rd place DNF at the Indianapolis Road Course. For the Indianapolis 500, he was the fastest through the first two rounds of qualifying. His speed during qualification allowed him to earn a spot in the Firestone Fast Six, qualifying fourth for the race. Then, in what would be the closest finish in Indianapolis 500 history, he beat Penske's David Malukas to the yard of bricks by the closest of margins (0.0233 seconds) to win his first Indianapolis 500. At the end of June, Meyer Shank announced Rosenqvist's departure from the team at the conclusion of the season. On July 13, he went to the White House to help promote the Freedom 250 Grand Prix along with Álex Palou and Malukas.

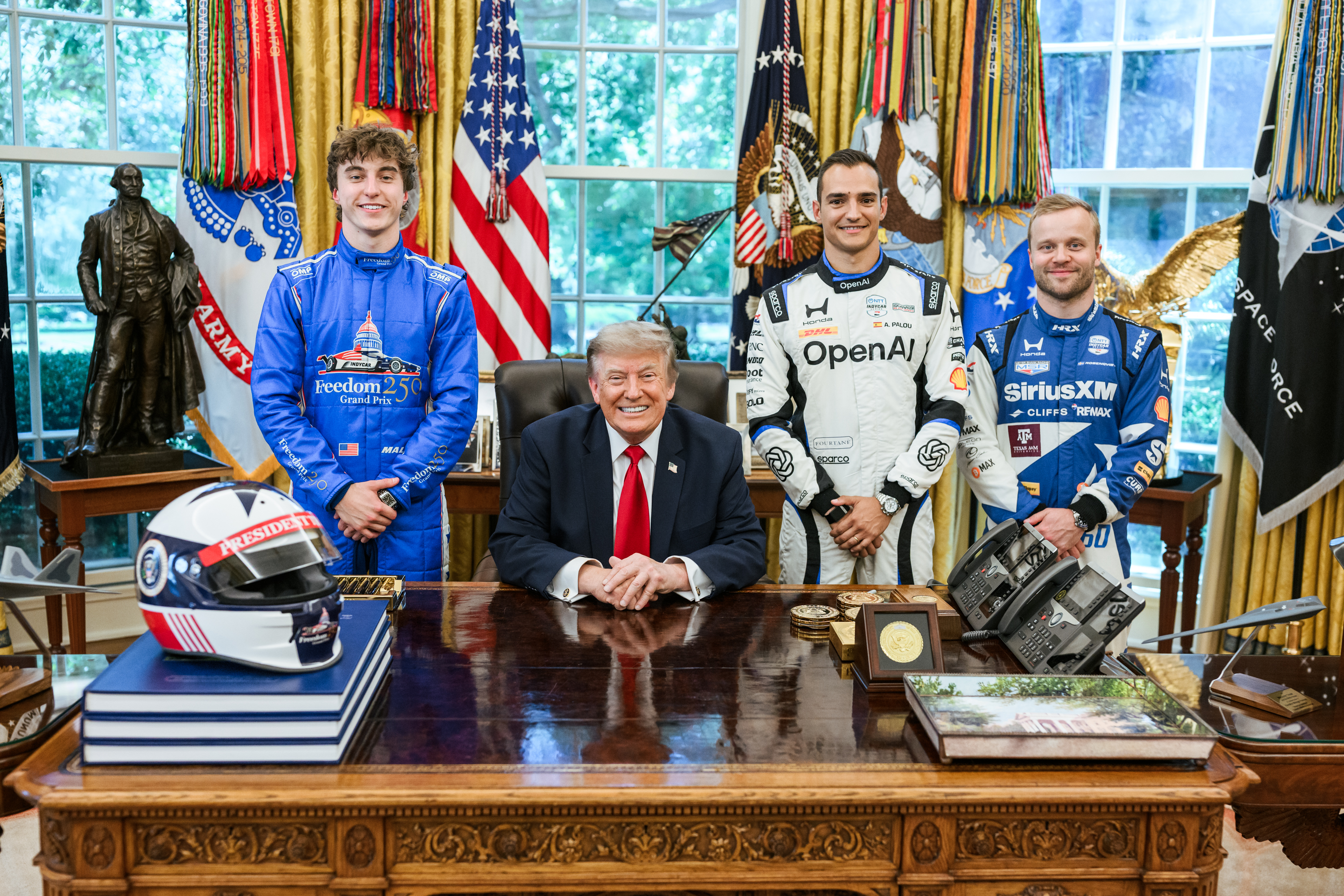
President Donald Trump (center) with three drivers involved in the race; from left to right: Malukas, Álex Palou and Rosenqvist.

==== Second stint at Arrow McLaren (2027–) ====
For 2027, Rosenqvist will return to Arrow McLaren with Pato O'Ward and Scott Dixon. It was announced on September 22nd that he will drive the No. 7 Chevrolet for them.

== Driving style ==
=== Street circuits ===
Rosenqvist is known to be a street circuit specialist, having won and earned poles at St. Petersburg, Toronto, Grand Prix de Pau, Norisring, Macau Grand Prix (two wins) and Long Beach, where he has started multiple times from the front row.

== Personal life ==
In November 2023, Rosenqvist became engaged to his long-term girlfriend Emille Sutt in Tanzania. They married on 24 September 2024 in Sweden and have one daughter, born 4 May 2026.

== Racing record ==
=== Career summary ===
Season	Series	Team	Races	Wins	Poles	F/Laps	Podiums	Points	Position
2007	Asian Formula Renault Challenge	March3 Racing	14	1	1	1	6	193	4th
2007	Formula Renault 2.0 NEC	Trakstar Racing	2	0	0	0	0	0	NC
2008	Formula Renault 2.0 Asia	March3 Racing	13	10	8	5	12	215	**1st**
2008	Asian Formula Renault Challenge	March3 Racing	2	2	0	1	2	60	8th
2008	Formula Renault 2.0 Italy	Prema Powerteam	2	0	0	0	0	0	NC
2009	Formula Renault 2.0 Sweden	BS Motorsport	14	6	6	3	13	115	**1st**
2009	Formula Renault 2.0 NEZ	BS Motorsport	10	3	2	1	9	193	**1st**
2009	Formula Palmer Audi	PalmerSport	3	2	0	2	2	48	21st
2010	German Formula 3 Championship	Performance Racing	18	2	1	0	8	83	5th
2011	Formula 3 Euro Series	Mücke Motorsport	27	1	0	5	10	219	5th
2011	Masters of Formula 3	Mücke Motorsport	1	1	0	1	1	N/A	**1st**
2011	Macau Grand Prix	Mücke Motorsport	1	0	0	0	0	N/A	DNF
2012	Formula 3 Euro Series	Mücke Motorsport	24	4	3	3	9	212.5	4th
2012	FIA Formula 3 European Championship	Mücke Motorsport	20	4	3	3	7	192	**3rd**
2012	Masters of Formula 3	Mücke Motorsport	1	0	0	0	0	N/A	9th
2012	Macau Grand Prix	Mücke Motorsport	1	0	0	0	1	N/A	**2nd**
2013	FIA Formula 3 European Championship	Mücke Motorsport	30	10	4	10	18	457	**2nd**
2013	Masters of Formula 3	Mücke Motorsport	1	1	1	1	1	N/A	**1st**
2013	Macau Grand Prix	Mücke Motorsport	1	0	0	0	0	N/A	DNF
2014	FIA Formula 3 European Championship	Mücke Motorsport	33	1	1	3	2	198	8th
2014	Macau Grand Prix	Mücke Motorsport	1	1	1	0	1	N/A	**1st**
2014	Formula Acceleration 1	Acceleration Team Sweden	4	2	1	2	3	73	5th
2015	FIA Formula 3 European Championship	Prema Powerteam	33	13	16	13	24	518	**1st**
2015	Macau Grand Prix	Prema Powerteam	1	1	1	1	1	N/A	**1st**
2016	Indy Lights	Belardi Auto Racing	10	3	3	3	3	185	12th
2016	Blancpain GT Series Sprint Cup	AKKA ASP	10	1	1	1	3	51	7th
2016	Blancpain GT Series Endurance Cup	AKKA ASP	1	0	0	0	1	18	23rd
2016	Intercontinental GT Challenge	AMG – Team AKKA ASP	1	1	0	0	1	25	7th
2016	Deutsche Tourenwagen Masters	Mercedes-Benz DTM Team ART	8	0	0	0	0	5	25th
2016	ADAC GT Masters	AMG – Team Zakspeed	2	0	0	0	0	13	37th
2016	IMSA SportsCar Championship – PC	Starworks Motorsport	1	0	0	0	0	1	31st
2016	Macau Grand Prix	Prema Powerteam	1	0	0	1	1	N/A	**2nd**
2016–17	Formula E	Mahindra Racing	12	1	3	2	5	127	**3rd**
2017	Super Formula	SUNOCO Team LeMans	7	0	0	2	3	28.5	**3rd**
2017	Porsche Carrera Cup Scandinavia	Mtech Competition	4	3	4	3	3	0	NC†
2017	24 Hours of Le Mans – LMP2	DragonSpeed – 10 Star	1	0	0	0	0	N/A	12th
2017	FIA GT World Cup	Scuderia Corsa	0	0	0	0	0	N/A	DNS
2017–18	Formula E	Mahindra Racing	12	2	3	1	2	96	6th
2018	Super GT	Lexus Team LeMans Wako's	7	0	0	0	1	41	10th
2018	IMSA SportsCar Championship – Prototype	Jackie Chan DCR JOTA	1	0	0	0	0	20	55th
2018	Blancpain GT Series Endurance Cup	Ram Racing	1	0	0	0	0	0	NC
2018	Blancpain GT Series Endurance Cup – Pro-Am	Ram Racing	1	0	1	0	0	5	24th
2018	Porsche Supercup	Dr. Ing h. c. F. Porsche AG	1	0	0	0	0	0	NC†
2018–19	Formula E	Mahindra Racing	1	0	0	0	0	0	25th
2019	IndyCar Series	Chip Ganassi Racing	17	0	1	0	2	425	6th
2020	IndyCar Series	Chip Ganassi Racing	14	1	0	2	1	306	11th
2021	IndyCar Series	Arrow McLaren SP	14	0	0	0	0	205	21st
2021	Porsche Carrera Cup Scandinavia	Porsche Experience Racing	2	0	1	0	2	38	14th
2022	IndyCar Series	Arrow McLaren SP	17	0	2	0	1	393	8th
2022	Porsche Carrera Cup Scandinavia	Porsche Experience Racing	2	0	1	0	0	8	25th
2023	IndyCar Series	Arrow McLaren	17	0	2	1	2	324	12th
2024	IndyCar Series	Meyer Shank Racing	18	0	1	0	1	306	12th
2024	IMSA SportsCar Championship - LMP2	United Autosports USA	1	0	0	0	0	226	55th
2025	IndyCar Series	Meyer Shank Racing	17	0	0	1	1	372	6th
2025	IMSA SportsCar Championship - GTP	Acura Meyer Shank Racing w/Curb-Agajanian	1	0	0	0	1	345	33rd
2026	IndyCar Series	Meyer Shank Racing with Curb-Agajanian	18	1	2	0	3	412	9th

^{†} As Rosenqvist was a guest driver, he was ineligible for points.
* Season still in progress

=== Complete German Formula Three Championship results ===
(key)

Year	Entrant	Chassis	Engine	1	2	3	4	5	6	7	8	9	10	11	12	13	14	15	16	17	18	DC	Points
2010	Performance Racing	Dallara F305	Volkswagen	OSC1; 1 Ret	OSC1; 2; 11	SAC; 1; 2	SAC; 2 Ret	HOC; 1 Ret	HOC; 2; 8	ASS1; 1; 1	ASS1; 2; 2	NÜR1; 1; 2	NÜR1; 2; 2	ASS2; 1; 6	**ASS2**; **2**; 1	LAU; 1; 8	LAU; 2; 2	NÜR2; 1; 5	NÜR2; 2; 4	OSC2; 1; 11	OSC2; 2; 2	5th	83

=== Complete Formula 3 Euro Series results ===
(key)

Year	Entrant	Engine	1	2	3	4	5	6	7	8	9	10	11	12	13	14	15	16	17	18	19	20	21	22	23	24	25	26	27	DC	Points
2011	Mücke Motorsport	Mercedes	LEC; 1; 2	LEC; 2; 4	LEC; 3 Ret	HOC; 1; 5	HOC; 2; 5	HOC; 3; 3	ZAN; 1; 2	ZAN; 2; 3	ZAN; 3; 2	RBR; 1 Ret	RBR; 2; 10	RBR; 3 Ret	NOR; 1 DSQ	NOR; 2; 5	NOR; 3; 5	NÜR; 1; 3	NÜR; 2; 2	NÜR; 3; 4	SIL; 1; 4	SIL; 2; 7	SIL; 3 Ret	VAL; 1; 2	VAL; 2; 6	VAL; 3; 4	HOC; 1; 2	HOC; 2; 1	HOC; 3 Ret	5th	219
2012	Mücke Motorsport	Mercedes	HOC; 1; 3	HOC; 2; 3	HOC; 3; 3	BRH; 1; 7	BRH; 2; 5	BRH; 3 Ret	RBR; 1; 9	RBR; 2 Ret	**RBR**; **3**; 11	NOR; 1; 6	NOR; 2; 4	NOR; 3; 14	NÜR; 1; 4	NÜR; 2; 3	NÜR; 2 Ret	ZAN; 1; 1	ZAN; 2; 6	ZAN; 3; 4	VAL; 1; 13	VAL; 2; 8	VAL; 3; 1	**HOC**; **1**; 1	HOC; 2; 9	**HOC**; **3**; 1				4th	212.5

=== Complete Macau Grand Prix results ===
Year	Team	Car	Qualifying	Quali Race	Main race
2011	(Germany) Mücke Motorsport	Dallara F308	8th	21st	DNF
2012	(Germany) Mücke Motorsport	Dallara F312	4th	**2nd**	**2nd**
2013	(Germany) Mücke Motorsport	Dallara F312	**2nd**	**2nd**	DNF
2014	(Germany) Mücke Motorsport	Dallara F312	**1st**	**1st**	**1st**
2015	(Italy) Prema Powerteam	Dallara F315	**1st**	**1st**	**1st**
2016	(Italy) Prema Powerteam	Dallara F315	8th	6th	**2nd**

=== Complete FIA Formula 3 European Championship results ===
(key)

Year	Entrant	Engine	1	2	3	4	5	6	7	8	9	10	11	12	13	14	15	16	17	18	19	20	21	22	23	24	25	26	27	28	29	30	31	32	33	DC	Points
2012	Mücke Motorsport	Mercedes	HOC; 1; 3	HOC; 2; 3	PAU; 1; 4	PAU; 2; 6	BRH; 1; 7	BRH; 2 Ret	RBR; 1; 9	**RBR**; **2**; 11	NOR; 1; 6	NOR; 2; 14	SPA; 1; 9	SPA; 2 Ret	NÜR; 1; 4	NÜR; 2 Ret	ZAN; 1; 1	ZAN; 2; 4	VAL; 1; 13	VAL; 2; 1	**HOC**; **1**; 1	**HOC**; **2**; 1														3rd	192
2013	Mücke Motorsport	Mercedes	MNZ; 1 Ret	MNZ; 2; 4	MNZ; 3; 11	SIL; 1; 3	SIL; 2; 1	SIL; 3; 2	HOC; 1; 8	HOC; 2; 10	HOC; 3; 1	BRH; 1; 4	BRH; 2; 5	BRH; 3; 3	RBR; 1; 1	RBR; 2; 1	RBR; 3; 1	**NOR**; **1**; 2	NOR; 2; 2	NOR; 3; 1	NÜR; 1; 3	NÜR; 2; 9	NÜR; 3; 5	ZAN; 1; 2	**ZAN**; **2**; 1	**ZAN**; **3**; 1	VAL; 1; 10	VAL; 2; 9	VAL; 3; 6	HOC; 1; 1	**HOC**; **2**; 1	HOC; 3; 2				2nd	457
2014	Mücke Motorsport	Mercedes	SIL; 1; 9	SIL; 2; 14	SIL; 3; 7	HOC; 1; 5	HOC; 2; 7	HOC; 3 Ret	PAU; 1; 14	PAU; 2 Ret	PAU; 3; 1	HUN; 1; 3	HUN; 2; 4	HUN; 3; 17	SPA; 1; 7	SPA; 2; 4	SPA; 3; 9	**NOR**; **1**; 6	NOR; 2; 6	NOR; 3; 11	MSC; 1; 8	MSC; 2; 7	MSC; 3; 5	RBR; 1; 4	RBR; 2 Ret	RBR; 3 Ret	NÜR; 1; 8	NÜR; 2; 7	NÜR; 3 Ret	IMO; 1; 4	IMO; 2; 9	IMO; 3 Ret	HOC; 1; 5	HOC; 2; 6	HOC; 3; 4	8th	198
2015	Prema Powerteam	Mercedes	**SIL**; **1**; 1	SIL; 2; 7	SIL; 3; 12	**HOC**; **1**; 2	**HOC**; **2**; 1	**HOC**; **3**; 2	PAU; 1; 14	PAU; 2; 5	PAU; 3; 6	**MNZ**; **1**; 1	**MNZ**; **2**; 1	**MNZ**; **3**; 1	**SPA**; **1**; 2	SPA; 2 Ret	SPA; 3; 5	NOR; 1; 3	NOR; 2; 17	NOR; 3; 13	ZAN; 1; 2	**ZAN**; **2**; 1	ZAN; 3; 3	**RBR**; **1**; 2	**RBR**; **2**; 1	RBR; 3; 2	ALG; 1; 3	**ALG**; **2**; 1	**ALG**; **3**; 1	**NÜR**; **1**; 1	**NÜR**; **2**; 1	**NÜR**; **3**; 1	**HOC**; **1**; 3	HOC; 2; 3	HOC; 3; 1	1st	518

=== American open-wheel racing results ===
==== Indy Lights ====
Year	Team	1	2	3	4	5	6	7	8	9	10	11	12	13	14	15	16	17	18	Rank	Points
2016	Belardi Auto Racing	STP; 7	**STP**; 1	PHX; 15	ALA; 14	ALA; 8	IMS; 4	IMS; 6	INDY; 9	RDA	RDA	IOW	**TOR**; 1	**TOR**; 1	MOH	MOH	WGL	LAG	LAG	12th	185

==== IndyCar Series ====
(key)

Year	Team	No.	Chassis	Engine	1	2	3	4	5	6	7	8	9	10	11	12	13	14	15	16	17	18	Rank	Points	Ref
2019	Chip Ganassi Racing	10	Dallara DW12	Honda	STP; 4	COA; 23	ALA; 10	LBH; 10	**IMS**; 8	INDY; 28	DET; 4	DET; 16	TXS; 12	RDA; 6	TOR; 5	IOW; 14	MOH; 2	POC; 22	GTW; 11	POR; 2	LAG; 5		6th	425	
2020	Chip Ganassi Racing	10	Dallara DW12	Honda	TXS; 20	IMS; 15	ROA; 18	ROA; 1	IOW; 14	IOW; 15	INDY; 12	GTW; 8	GTW; 7	MOH; 6	MOH; 22	IMS; 5	IMS; 11	STP; 18					11th	306	
2021	Arrow McLaren SP	7	Dallara DW12	Chevrolet	ALA; 21	STP; 12	TXS; 13	TXS; 16	IMS; 17	INDY; 27	DET; 25	DET	ROA	MOH; 23	NSH; 8	IMS; 13	GTW; 16	POR; 6	LAG; 19	LBH; 13			21st	205	
2022	Arrow McLaren SP	7	Dallara DW12	Chevrolet	STP; 17	**TXS**; 21	LBH; 11	ALA; 16	IMS; 6	INDY; 4	DET; 10	ROA; 6	MOH; 27	TOR; 3	IOW; 26	IOW; 7	**IMS**; 9	NSH; 7	GTW; 16	POR; 10	LAG; 4		8th	393	
2023	Arrow McLaren	6	Dallara DW12	Chevrolet	STP; 19	**TXS**; 26	LBH; 7	ALA; 9	IMS; 5	INDY; 27	DET; 3	ROA; 20	MOH; 25	TOR; 10	IOW; 13	IOW; 4	NSH; 22	IMS; 27	GTW; 8	POR; 2	**LAG**; 19		12th	324	
2024	Meyer Shank Racing	60	Dallara DW12	Honda	STP; 5	THE; 3	**LBH**; 9	ALA; 4	IMS; 10	INDY; 27	DET; 8	ROA; 14	LAG; 11	MOH; 14	IOW; 13	IOW; 26	TOR; 23	GTW; 6	POR; 14	MIL; 13	MIL; 11	NSH; 27	12th	306	
2025	Meyer Shank Racing w/ Curb Agajanian	60	Dallara DW12	Honda	STP; 7	THE; 5	LBH; 4	ALA; 13	IMS; 10	INDY; 4	DET; 21	GTW; 16	ROA; 2	MOH; 6	IOW; 17	IOW; 7	TOR; 19	LAG; 24	POR; 9	MIL; 22	NSH; 7		6th	372	
2026	Meyer Shank Racing w/ Curb Agajanian	60	Dallara DW12	Honda	STP; 12	PHX; 12	ARL; 19	ALA; 13	**LBH**; 2*	IMS; 23	INDY; 1	DET; 6	GTW; 14	ROA; 8*	MOH; 13	NSH; 5	**POR**; 2	MRK; 24	WSH; 19	MIL; 17	MIL; 20	LAG; 4	9th	412	

* Season still in progress.

==== Indianapolis 500 ====
Year	Chassis	Engine	Start	Finish	Team
2019	Dallara	Honda	29	28	Chip Ganassi Racing
2020	Dallara	Honda	14	12	Chip Ganassi Racing
2021	Dallara	Chevrolet	14	27	Arrow McLaren SP
2022	Dallara	Chevrolet	8	4	Arrow McLaren SP
2023	Dallara	Chevrolet	3	27	Arrow McLaren
2024	Dallara	Honda	9	27	Meyer Shank Racing
2025	Dallara	Honda	5	4	Meyer Shank Racing
2026	Dallara	Honda	4	**1**	Meyer Shank Racing

=== Complete Blancpain GT Series Sprint Cup results ===
Year	Team	Car	Class	1	2	3	4	5	6	7	8	9	10	Pos.	Points
2016	AKKA ASP	Mercedes-AMG GT3	Pro	MIS; QR; 7	MIS; CR; 32	BRH; QR; 9	BRH; CR; 9	NÜR; QR; 27	NÜR; CR; 10	**HUN**; **QR**; 2	HUN; CR; 4	CAT; QR; 3	CAT; CR; 1	7th	51

=== Complete Deutsche Tourenwagen Masters results ===
(key) (Races in bold indicate pole position) (Races in italics indicate fastest lap)

Year	Team	Car	1	2	3	4	5	6	7	8	9	10	11	12	13	14	15	16	17	18	Pos	Points
2016	Mercedes-Benz DTM Team ART	Mercedes-AMG C63 DTM	HOC; 1	HOC; 2	SPL; 1	SPL; 2	LAU; 1	LAU; 2	NOR; 1	NOR; 2	ZAN; 1	ZAN; 2	MSC; 1; 10	MSC; 2; 20	NÜR; 1; 12	NÜR; 2; 18	HUN; 1; 8	HUN; 2; 11	HOC; 1 Ret	HOC; 2 Ret	25th	5

=== Complete Formula E results ===
(key) (Races in bold indicate pole position; races in italics indicate fastest lap)

Year	Team	Chassis	Powertrain	1	2	3	4	5	6	7	8	9	10	11	12	13	Pos	Points
2016–17	Mahindra Racing	Spark SRT01-e	Mahindra M3Electro	HKG; 15	**MRK**; 3	BUE; 18	MEX; 16†	MCO; 6	PAR; 4	BER; 1	**BER**; 2	NYC; 15	NYC; 2	MTL; 9	**MTL**; 2		3rd	127
2017–18	Mahindra Racing	Spark SRT01-e	Mahindra M4Electro	HKG; 14	**HKG**; 1	MRK; 1	SCL; 4	**MEX**; Ret	PDE; 5	**RME**; Ret	PAR; 8	BER; 11	ZUR; 15	NYC; 14	NYC; 5		6th	96
2018–19	Mahindra Racing	Spark SRT05e	Mahindra M5Electro	ADR; Ret	MRK	SCL	MEX	HKG	SYX	RME	PAR	MCO	BER	BRN	NYC	NYC	NC	0

^{†} Driver did not finish the race but was classified as he completed more than 90% of the race distance.

=== Complete Super Formula results ===
(Races in bold indicate pole position)

Year	Team	Engine	1	2	3	4	5	6	7	8	9	DC	Points
2017	SUNOCO Team LeMans	Toyota	SUZ; 11	OKA; 12	OKA; 4	FUJ; 2	MOT; 3	AUT; 2	SUG; 5	SUZ; C	SUZ; C	3rd	28.5

=== 24 Hours of Le Mans results ===
Year	Team	Co-Drivers	Car	Class	Laps	Pos.	Class Pos.
2017	(United States) Dragonspeed – 10 Star	(Sweden) Henrik Hedman (United Kingdom) Ben Hanley	Oreca 07-Gibson	LMP2	343	14th	12th

=== Complete IMSA SportsCar Championship ===
Year	Team	Class	Make	Engine	1	2	3	4	5	6	7	8	9	10	11	Rank	Points	Ref
2016	Starworks Motorsport	PC	Oreca FLM09	Chevrolet LS3 6.2 L V8	DAY; 7†	SEB	LBH	LGA	DET	WGL	MOS	LIM	ELK	COA	PET	31st	1	
2018	Jackie Chan DCR JOTA	P	Oreca 07	Gibson GK428 4.2 L V8	DAY; 11	SEB	LBH	MOH	DET	WGL	MOS	ELK	LGA	PET		55th	20	
2024	United Autosports USA	LMP2	Oreca 07	Gibson GK428 4.2 L V8	DAY; 11	SEB	WGL	MOS	ELK	IMS	PET					55th	226	
2025	Acura Meyer Shank Racing w/Curb-Agajanian	GTP	Acura ARX-06	Acura AR24e 2.4 L Turbo V6	DAY; 2	SEB	LBH	LGA	DET	WGL	ELK	IMS	PET			33rd	345	

^{†} Rosenqvist did not complete sufficient laps in order to score full points.

=== 24 Hours of Daytona ===
Year	Team	Co-drivers	Car	Class	Laps	Pos.	Class pos.
2016	(United States) Starworks Motorsport	(United States) Sean Johnston (Germany) Maro Engel (United States) Mark Kvamme	Oreca FLM09-Chevrolet	PC	179	DNF	DNF
2018	(China) Jackie Chan DCR JOTA	(Netherlands) Robin Frijns (Spain) Daniel Juncadella (Canada) Lance Stroll	Oreca 07-Gibson	P	777	15th	11th
2024	(United States) United Autosports USA	(United Kingdom) Paul di Resta (United States) Bijoy Garg (United States) Dan Goldburg	Oreca 07-Gibson	LMP2	128	DNF	DNF
2025	(United States) Acura Meyer Shank-Racing w/Curb-Agajan	(United Kingdom) Tom Blomqvist (United States) Colin Braun (New Zealand) Scott Dixon	Acura ARX-06	GTP	781	2nd	2nd

=== Complete Super GT results ===
Year	Team	Car	Class	1	2	3	4	5	6	7	8	DC	Points
2018	Lexus Team LeMans Wako's	Lexus LC 500	GT500	OKA; 4	FUJ; 5	SUZ	CHA; 2	FUJ; 7	SUG; 11	AUT; 9	MOT; 6	10th	41

Sporting positions
Preceded by Álex Palou	Indianapolis 500; Winner; 2026	Succeeded by Incumbent
Preceded by Inaugural	Formula Renault 2.0 Asia; Champion; 2008	Succeeded by None (Series ended)
Preceded by Daniel Roos	Formula Renault 2.0 NEZ; Champion; 2009	Succeeded by Jesse Krohn
Preceded by Steffen Møller (2006)	Formula Renault 2.0 Sweden; Champion; 2009	Succeeded by Daniel Roos
Preceded by Valtteri Bottas	Masters of Formula 3 Winner; 2011	Succeeded by Daniel Juncadella
Preceded by Daniel Juncadella	Masters of Formula 3 Winner; 2013	Succeeded by Max Verstappen
Preceded by Alex Lynn	Macau Grand Prix; Winner; 2014–2015	Succeeded by António Félix da Costa
Preceded by Esteban Ocon	FIA Formula 3 European Championship; Champion; 2015	Succeeded by Lance Stroll
