= 2015 Macau Grand Prix =

Formula Three motor race

Race details
Date	22 November 2015
Official name	62nd Suncity Groupo Macau Grand Prix
Location	Guia Circuit, Macau
Course	Temporary street circuit 6.120 km (3.803 mi)
Distance	Qualifying Race; 10 laps, 61.200 km (38.028 mi); Main Race; 15 laps, 91.800 km (57.042 mi)
Weather	Qualifying Race: Cloudy; air 26 °C (79 °F), track 27 °C (81 °F); Main Race: Cloudy; air 28 °C (82 °F), track 32 °C (90 °F)
- Qualifying Race

Pole
Driver	(Sweden) Felix Rosenqvist	Theodore Racing by Prema
Time	2:10.474

Fastest Lap
Driver	(Sweden) Felix Rosenqvist	Theodore Racing by Prema
Time	2:10.330 (on lap 9)

Podium
First	(Sweden) Felix Rosenqvist	Theodore Racing by Prema
Second	(Monaco) Charles Leclerc	Van Amersfoort Racing
Third	(United Kingdom) Alexander Sims	Double R Racing
- Main Race

Pole
Driver	(Sweden) Felix Rosenqvist	Theodore Racing by Prema

Fastest Lap
Driver	(Brazil) Sérgio Sette Câmara	Motopark
Time	2:10.186 (on lap 15)

Podium
First	(Sweden) Felix Rosenqvist	Theodore Racing by Prema
Second	(Monaco) Charles Leclerc	Van Amersfoort Racing
Third	(United Kingdom) Alexander Sims	Double R Racing

The 2015 Macau Grand Prix (formally the 62nd Suncity Group Macau Grand Prix - FIA F3 Intercontinental Cup) was a motor race for Formula Three cars that was held on the streets of Macau on 22 November 2015. Unlike other races, such as the Masters of Formula 3, the 2015 Macau Grand Prix was not a part of any Formula Three championship, but was open to entries from all Formula Three championships. The race itself was made up of two races: a ten-lap qualifying race that decided the starting grid for the fifteen-lap main race. The 2015 race was the 62nd running of the Macau Grand Prix and the 33rd for Formula Three cars.

The Grand Prix was won by Theodore Racing by Prema driver Felix Rosenqvist from pole position, having won the Qualification Race the previous afternoon after the on the road victor Antonio Giovinazzi was penalised 20 seconds for a first lap crash. Rosenqvist led the majority of the main race to clinch his second consecutive Macau Grand Prix victory, the first time this had happened since Edoardo Mortara won the 2009 and 2010 races. Second place went to the highest placed rookie driver, Charles Leclerc for Van Amersfoort Racing, while the podium was completed by Double R Racing driver Alexander Sims.

== Entry list and background ==
The Macau Grand Prix is a Formula Three race considered to be a stepping stone to higher motor racing categories such as Formula One and is the territory's most prestigious international sporting event. The 2015 Macau Grand Prix was the 62nd running of the event and the 33rd time that the race was held to Formula Three regulations. It took place on the 6.2 km (3.9 mi) 22-turn Guia Circuit on 22 November 2015 with three preceding days of practice and qualifying.

In order to compete in Macau, drivers had to compete in a Fédération Internationale de l'Automobile (FIA)-regulated championship meeting during the calendar year, in either the FIA Formula Three European Championship or one of the domestic championships, with drivers placed high up in the rankings of these respective championships given priority in receiving an invitation to the meeting. Within the 28-car grid of the event, two of the three major Formula Three series were represented by their respective champion. Defending race winner Felix Rosenqvist, the Formula Three European champion, was joined in Macau by Japanese series winner Nick Cassidy. As was the case in 2014, Euroformula Open racer Yu Kanamaru was a late addition to the entry list at Carlin after George Russell was withdrawn from the race.

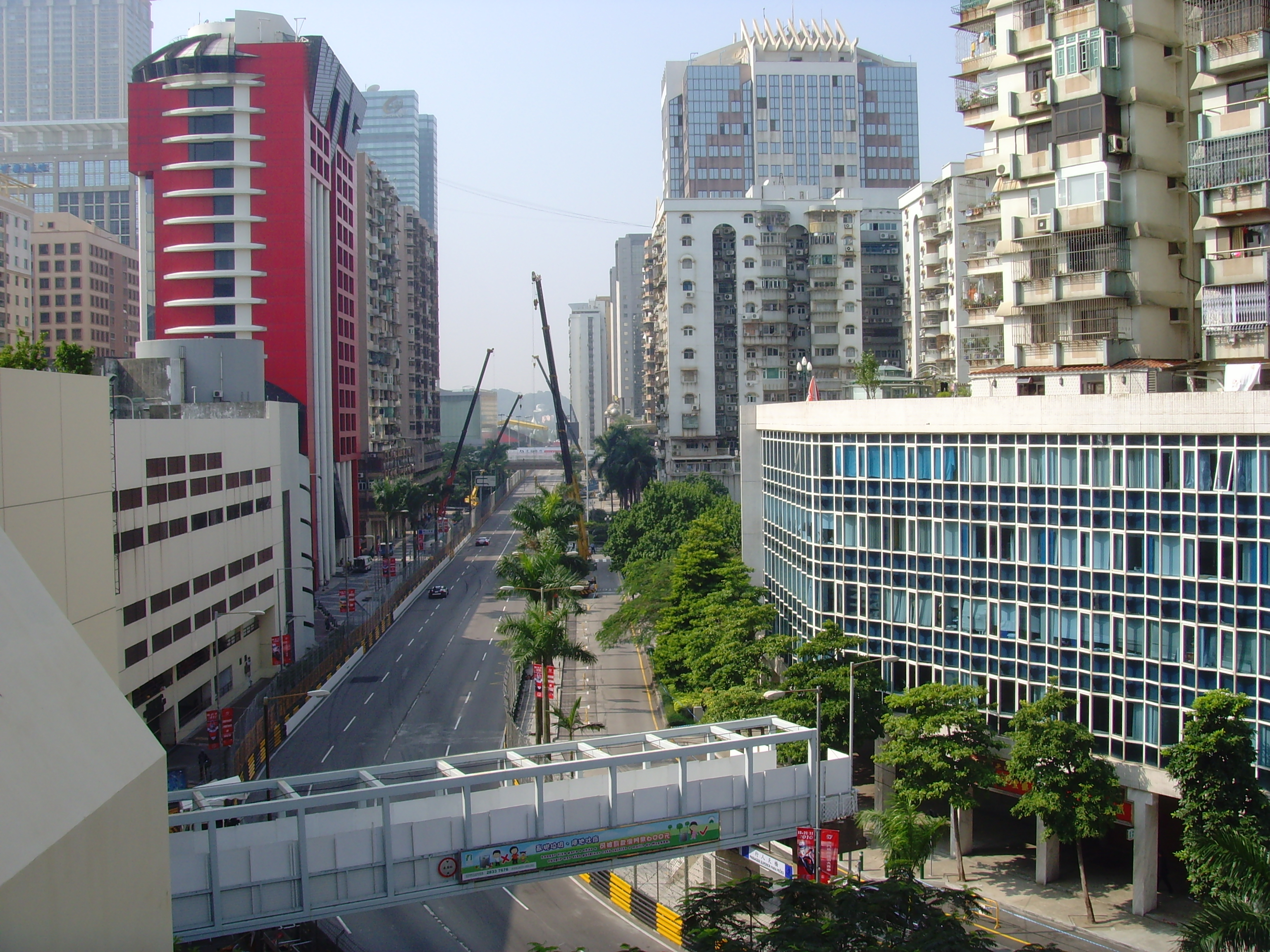
The Guia Circuit, where the race was held

Three drivers who mainly competed in other series outside of Formula Three in 2015 became eligible for the Macau race: British GT driver Alexander Sims competed in the Formula Three European Championship in the Algarve International Circuit round in order to become eligible. Deutsche Tourenwagen Masters racer Daniel Juncadella had to wait until his main series campaign had concluded before sealing his eligibility; he took part in the Euroformula Open Championship, a second-tier Formula Three series in Europe, in its season-ending round at the Hockenheimring. Super GT participant Yuhi Sekiguchi sealed his eligibility for the Macau Grand Prix by competing in the All-Japan Formula Three round at Twin Ring Motegi.

At the start of 2015, the Macau Grand Prix coordinator Barry Bland discussed the implementation of the virtual safety car (VSC) system with race director Charlie Whiting during the drawing up of the race's sporting regulations. Provision for the system was implemented into the regulations and would help save a large amount of time as well as aiding drivers in blind corners. Thus the Grand Prix was designated a "test race" for the VSC in order for the system to be written into the 2016 Formula Three European Championship regulations.

== Practice and qualifying ==
There were two 45-minute practice sessions preceding the Sunday race: one on Thursday morning and one on Friday morning. Antonio Giovinazzi set the fastest lap for Carlin in the opening practice session of 2 minutes, 13.829 seconds, nearly eight-tenths of a second faster than anyone else. His closest challenger was Felix Rosenqvist who fought Giovinazzi for the top spot. Markus Pommer was third-fastest, ahead of the Japanese trio of Kenta Yamashita, Sekiguchi and Kanamaru. Cassidy, Lance Stroll, Mitsunori Takaboshi and Alexander Albon rounded out the session's top ten drivers. The session was red flagged twice: Jake Dennis crashed into the right-hand wall at the Solitude Esses after sustaining a puncture 20 minutes in, and Callum Ilott struck the barrier at the left-hand turn before Faraway corner with nine minutes left. Two other drivers, Sims and Zhi Cong Li, crashed at Lisboa turn but no stoppages were necessitated because both cars were retrieved from the track without difficulty.

Qualifying was divided into two sessions; the first was held on Thursday afternoon and ran for 40 minutes with the second held on Friday afternoon and lasting for 30 minutes. The fastest time set by each driver from either session counted towards his final starting position for the qualification race. The first qualifying session had Rosenqvist come out on top with a time of 2 minutes, 11.842 seconds on the session's final lap with new tyres. He was eight-tenths of a second quicker than Ilott in second with teammate Giovinazzi another thousandth of a second slower in third. Ilott and Giovinazzi led at various points in the session before Rosenqvist's last lap effort. Sam MacLeod improved on his last lap to finish fourth after four new tyres were installed at his pit stop. On his last timed lap, Juncadella recovered from an earlier free practice gearbox problem to place provisionally fifth. Having been in contention, Pommer finished sixth, with Sekiguci and Mikkel Jensen in close proximity on the time sheets. Gustavo Menezes and Sims rounded out the top ten. Following them were Charles Leclerc, Kanamaru, Stroll and Arjun Maini, Alessio Lorandi, Dennis–whose air restrictor fell off his car and then had gearbox issues–Dorian Boccolacci, Yamashita, Santino Ferrucci, Cassidy, Albon, Sérgio Sette Câmara, Martin Cao, Ryan Tveter, Takaboshi, Matt Solomon, Zhi Cong Li and Wing Chung Chang. The session passed relatively smoothly, with only Sette Câmara crashing and then stopping at San Francisco Hill to prevent further damage en route to the pit lane.

In the second 45-minute practice session, Pommer fought with Rosenqvist and Leclerc for the top spot until the former set a benchmark past the midpoint of the session and the time he set of 2 minutes, 11.102 (which was the fastest of the race meeting at that point) remained fastest until the conclusion of the second practice session. Rosenqvist followed three-tenths of a second adrift in second and Leclerc continued his progression up the time sheets to third. Giovinazzi was the last driver to be within one second of the pace set by Pommer's in fourth. Stroll, Juncadella, Dennis, Jensen and the British pairing of MacLeod and Ilott composed positions six to ten. Three crashes occurred during the session as Stroll went straight into a barrier at the Melco hairpin and Boccalacci triggered the sole stoppage with an error that heavily damaged his car against the wall at the exit of San Francisco Bend. Cao lost control of his vehicle at Paiol corner and damaged its right-hand side suspension in an impact with the barrier but entered the pit lane for repairs.

The second qualifying session was delayed due to multiple crashes during qualifying for the FIA GT World Cup support race. When the session did begin and before any competitor could record a timed lap, the first of two red flags was waved for Ilott who hit a barrier exiting the San Francisco Bend. Later Melco hairpin was blocked when Menezes attempted to return to pit lane after a driver error at Moorish turn. He could not get enough steering lock and understeered into a wall. Lorandi could not react quickly enough and ploughed into Menezes's rear. Lorandi's rear in turn was hit by a Signature car. Rosenqvist continued his strong form from Thursday's qualifying and set the pace again before Leclerc usurped his time halfway through. Rosenqvist had new tyres installed and returned to the top. He later improved with a lap of 2 minutes, 10.474 seconds in response to Juncadella getting close to his pace. The session was abandoned with four minutes remaining when Giovinazzi crashed at the left-hand corner before Maternity Bend. Thus, Rosenqvist took pole position by 0.213 seconds from Juncadella. Leclerc moved from eleventh to start third and was the best placed rookie driver. Giovinazzi fell from third to fourth. Pommer was in the top three for most of the session before finishing fifth. However he incurred a two-place grid penalty for impeding another car during qualifying. MacLeod and Sette Câmara inherited fifth and sixth as a result of Pommer's penalty. Pommer was ahead of a close trio of cars driven by Macau rookies. Maini, Lorandi and Stroll were in positions eight through ten. The sixth row was adorned by the Mücke Motorsport cars of Ferrucci and Jensen. The rest of the grid lined up as the British duo of Sims and Dennis, Albon, Sekiguchi, Tveter, Ilott, the Japanese pair of Kanamaru and Takaboshi, Chang, Cao, Yamashita, Cassidy, Menezes, Boccolacci, Solomon and Zhi.

=== Qualifying classification ===
Each of the driver's fastest lap times from the two qualifying sessions are denoted in bold.

Final qualifying classification
Pos	No.	Driver	Team	Q1 Time	Rank	Q2 Time	Rank	Gap	Grid
1	1	(Sweden) Felix Rosenqvist	Prema Powerteam	2:11.841	1	**2:10.474**	1	—	1
2	21	(Spain) Daniel Juncadella	Fortec Motorsport	2:13.412	5	**2:10.687**	2	+0.213	2
3	15	(Monaco) Charles Leclerc	Van Amersfoort Racing	2:14.099	11	**2:10.796**	3	+0.322	3
4	7	(Italy) Antonio Giovinazzi	Carlin	2:12.824	3	**2:11.034**	4	+0.560	4
5	19	(Germany) Markus Pommer	Motopark	2:13.741	6	**2:11.091**	5	+0.617	7^{1}
6	29	(United Kingdom) Sam MacLeod	Team West-Tec F3	2:13.109	4	**2:11.523**	6	+1.049	5
7	20	(Brazil) Sérgio Sette Câmara	Motopark	2:15.206	22	**2:11.721**	7	+1.247	6
8	27	(India) Arjun Maini	ThreeBond with T-Sport	2:14.281	14	**2:11.722**	8	+1.248	8
9	16	(Italy) Alessio Lorandi	Van Amersfoort Racing	2:14.314	15	**2:11.732**	9	+1.249	9
10	3	(Canada) Lance Stroll	Prema Powerteam	2:14.244	13	**2:11.794**	10	+1.320	10
11	24	(United States) Santino Ferrucci	Mücke Motorsport	2:14.548	19	**2:11.965**	11	+1.491	11
12	25	(Denmark) Mikkel Jensen	Mücke Motorsport	2:13.757	8	**2:12.026**	12	+1.552	12
13	30	(United Kingdom) Alexander Sims	Double R Racing	2:13.950	10	**2:12.036**	13	+1.562	13
14	2	(United Kingdom) Jake Dennis	Prema Powerteam	2:14.332	16	**2:12.053**	14	+1.579	14
15	17	(Thailand) Alexander Albon	Signature	2:15.159	21	**2:12.054**	15	+1.580	15
16	12	(Japan) Yuhi Sekiguchi	B-Max Engineering	2:13.744	7	**2:12.197**	16	+1.723	16
17	28	(United States) Ryan Tveter	Team West-Tec F3	2:15.700	24	**2:12.474**	27	+2.000	17
18	10	(United Kingdom) Callum Ilott	Carlin	**2:12.663**	2	—	—	+2.189	18
19	9	(Japan) Yu Kanamaru	Carlin	2:14.238	12	**2:12.723**	18	+2.249	19
20	11	(Japan) Mitsunori Takaboshi	B-Max Engineering	2:16.249	25	**2:12.836**	19	+2.362	20
21	22	(Macau) Wing Chung Chang	Fortec Motorsport	2:21.501	28	**2:12.879**	20	+2.405	21
22	23	(China) Martin Cao	Fortec Motorsport	2:15.316	23	**2:12.969**	21	+2.495	22
23	5	(Japan) Kenta Yamashita	TOM'S	2:14.546	18	**2:13.027**	22	+2.553	23
24	6	(New Zealand) Nick Cassidy	TOM'S	2:14.631	20	**2:13.162**	23	+2.688	24
25	8	(United States) Gustavo Menezes	Carlin	2:13.903	9	**2:13.369**	24	+2.895	25
26	18	(France) Dorian Boccolacci	Signature	2:14.463	17	**2:13.683**	25	+3.209	26
27	31	(Hong Kong) Matt Solomon	Double R Racing	2:16.766	26	**2:13.736**	28	+3.262	27
28	25	(China) Zhi Cong Li	Jo Zeller Racing	2:18.800	27	**2:14.525**	26	+4.051	28
110% qualifying time: 2:23.5214
**Bold time** indicates the faster of the two times that determined the grid order.

Notes:

- **^1** – Markus Pommer was penalised two places on the grid for impeding another car during second qualifying.

== Qualifying race ==
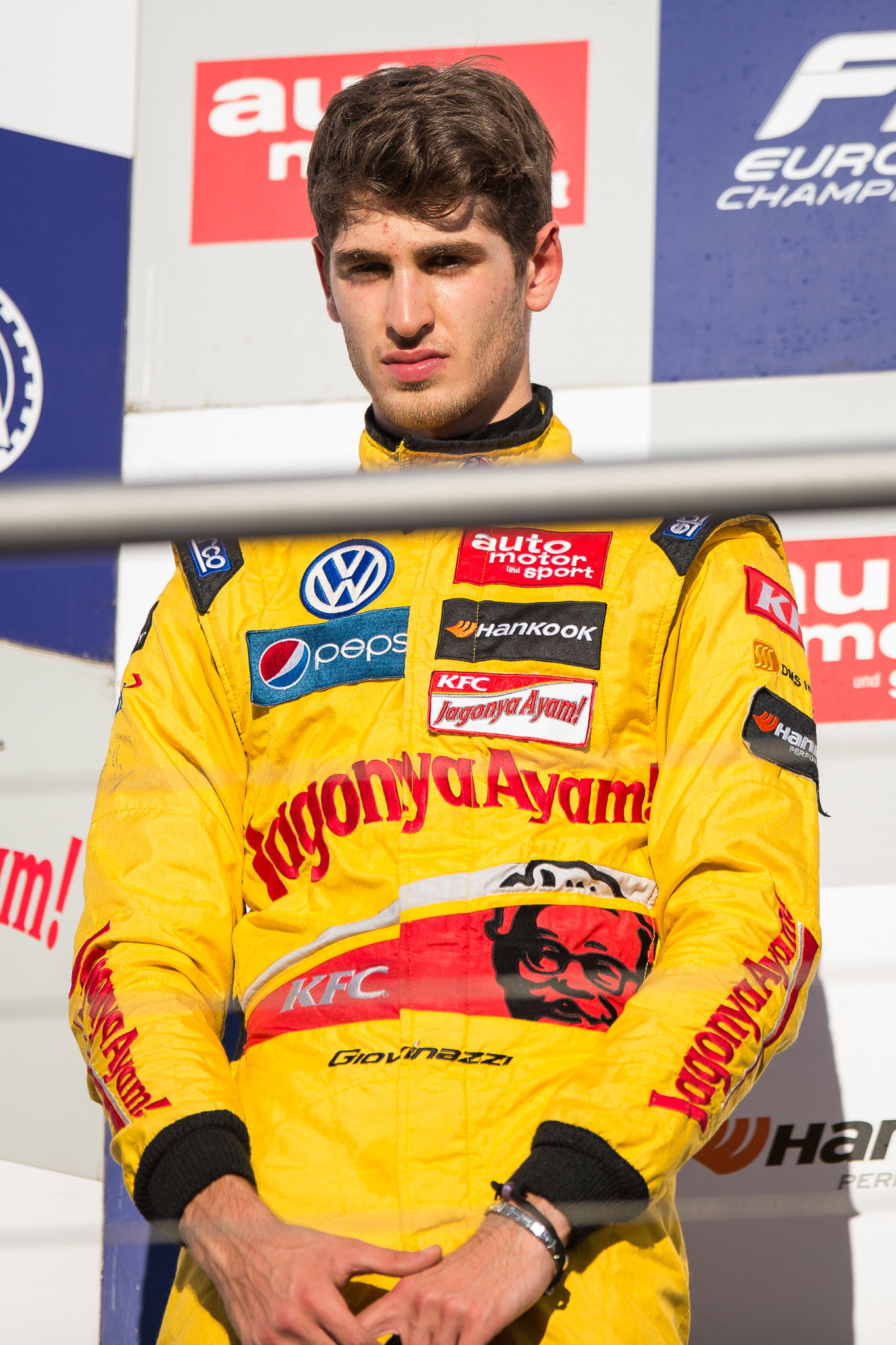
Antonio Giovinazzi (pictured in 2014) finished the qualification race first on the road but was penalised twenty seconds for contact with Daniel Juncadella on the first lap.

The qualifying race to set the grid order for the main race started at 13:45 Macau Standard Time (UTC+08:00) on 21 November. The weather at the start was dry and cloudy with the air temperature 26 °C (79 °F) and the track temperature 27 °C (81 °F). On the grid, Rosenqvist made a clean start to lead the field into Lisboa corner with Juncadella slotting behind in second position. Giovinazzi made a similarly good start and passed Leclerc for third and attempted to pass Juncadella. By the time the two reached the turn's braking area, Giovinazzi muscled himself to the inside of Juncadella and his front-right tyre made contact with the latter's left-rear wheel. Juncadella was sent spinning across the track and into the inside barrier. Tveter battled Dennis for position but had no room to negotiate and slammed into the stationary Juncadella. Tveter was hit in turn by Ilott which bruised and cut Ilott's hand. Behind the duo, Jensen struck the rear of Albon's car and the resulting pile up partially blocked the circuit and necessitated the safety car's deployment.

Under the safety car, Jensen, Kanamaru, Sekiguichi and Chang chose to make pit stops for car repairs. The safety car was withdrawn after one lap and racing resumed on lap three. Giovinazzi slipstreaming onto the back of Rosenqvist soon after and overtook him around the outside before the braking point for Lisboa corner to move into the lead. Giovinazzi slid going into Lisboa corner but regained control of his car. Zhi become another retiree when he crashed at Police turn after the restart. Sims passed Sette Câmara and then MacLeod before Lisboa turn to claim fourth on the fourth lap. He began to focus on lowering the time deficit to the leading trio of cars with consecutive fastest laps. At the front, Giovinazzi extended his lead to 1½ seconds and drew clear from Rosenqvist. Ferrucci passed Maini and Lorandi to settle for seventh by its conclusion. Giovinazzi struggled for grip, and Rosenqvist reduced his lead to eight-tenths of a second by the start of the final lap. Rosenqvist then slipstreamed up behind Giovinazzi into Lisboa corner.

Rosenqvist moved out of the slipstream but made an error at the Melco hairpin after over-adjusting his brake bias to compensate for brake locking. Leclerc closed to within half a second of Rosenqvist although he could not draw close enough to challenge him. Giovinazzi opened up a 1.9-second lead and maintained it to finish first on the road. Soon after Giovinazzi incurred a drive-through penalty for his role in the Juncadella clash on the first lap. This subsequently increased to a 20-second time penalty and Giovnazzi was demoted to tenth. After the race, his team discussed the penalty with the stewards who decided no change was needed. Thus, Rosenqvist took the qualifying race victory and pole position for the Grand Prix itself. He was joined on the grid's front row by Leclerc, while Sims completed the podium. Behind him, MacLeod finished fourth, ahead of a close up consisting of Pommer, Sette Câmara, Ferrucci, Lorandi and Maini. Outside the top ten, Dennis took 11th ahead of Boccolacci. Stroll, Cao, Yamashita, Sekiguchi, Cassidy, Chang, Menezes, Kanamaru, Solomon and Jensen rounded out the top 22 classified finishers.

=== Qualifying race classification ===
Final qualification race classification
Pos	No.	Driver	Team	Laps	Time/Retired	Grid
1	1	(Sweden) Felix Rosenqvist	Prema Powerteam	10	24:52.619	1
2	15	(Monaco) Charles Leclerc	Van Amersfoort Racing	10	+0.503	3
3	30	(United Kingdom) Alexander Sims	Double R Racing	10	+2.701	13
4	29	(United Kingdom) Sam MacLeod	Team West-Tec F3	10	+8.399	6
5	19	(Germany) Markus Pommer	Motopark	10	+9.412	5
6	20	(Brazil) Sérgio Sette Câmara	Motopark	10	+13.993	7
7	24	(United States) Santino Ferrucci	Mücke Motorsport	10	+15.538	11
8	16	(Italy) Alessio Lorandi	Van Amersfoort Racing	10	+16.627	9
9	27	(India) Arjun Maini	ThreeBond with T-Sport	10	+17.360	8
10	7	(Italy) Antonio Giovinazzi	Carlin	10	+17.871	4^{2}
11	2	(United Kingdom) Jake Dennis	Prema Powerteam	10	+18.131	14
12	18	(France) Dorian Boccolacci	Signature	10	+20.682	26
13	3	(Canada) Lance Stroll	Prema Powerteam	10	+21.872	13
14	23	(China) Martin Cao	Fortec Motorsport	10	+25.606	14
15	5	(Japan) Kenta Yamashita	TOM'S	10	+26.323	23
16	12	(Japan) Yuhi Sekiguchi	B-Max Engineering	10	+29.468	16
17	6	(New Zealand) Nick Cassidy	TOM'S	10	+29.931	24
18	22	(Macau) Wing Chung Chang	Fortec Motorsport	10	+36.386	25
19	8	(United States) Gustavo Menezes	Carlin	10	+41.342	27
20	9	(Japan) Yu Kanamaru	Carlin	10	+1:31.509	19
21	31	(Hong Kong) Matt Solomon	Double R Racing	10	+1:41.666	27
22	25	(Denmark) Mikkel Jensen	Mücke Motorsport	10	+2:00.925	12
Ret	11	(Japan) Mitsunori Takaboshi	B-Max Engineering	6	Retired	20
Ret	32	(China) Zhi Cong Li	Jo Zeller Racing	3	Retired	28
Ret	21	(Spain) Daniel Juncadella	Fortec Motorsport	0	Retired	2
Ret	17	(Thailand) Alexander Albon	Signature	0	Retired	15
Ret	28	(United States) Ryan Tveter	Team West-Tec F3	0	Retired	17
Ret	10	(United Kingdom) Callum Ilott	Carlin	0	Retired	18
Fastest lap: Felix Rosenqvist, 2:10.330, 169.05 km/h (105.04 mph) on lap 9

Note

- ^2 – Antonio Giovinazzi had twenty seconds added to his race time for colliding with Daniel Juncadella on the first lap.

== Main race ==
The race started at 15:30 local time on 22 November. The weather at the beginning was dry and sunny with an air temperature of 28 °C (82 °F) and a track temperature at 32 °C (90 °F). Juncadella failed to start the event after his crash during the qualification race damaged the tub of his car. When the race began from its standing start, Rosenqvist led the field into Lisboa corner and Leclerc challenged him. Leclerc steered onto the outside and overtook Rosenqvist braking at Lisboa corner for the lead. A slow exit from Leclerc leaving the final turn as he was completing the first lap allowed Rosenqvist to run in his slipstream and turned onto the inside to reclaim first place. Leclerc then moved into Rosenqvist's slipstream and executed an identical move from the first lap to overtake him around the outside for the lead. Soon after a large crash involving Menezes and Tveter and Takaboshi at Fisherman's Bend stopped the race since debris was littered across the track. All three were unhurt.

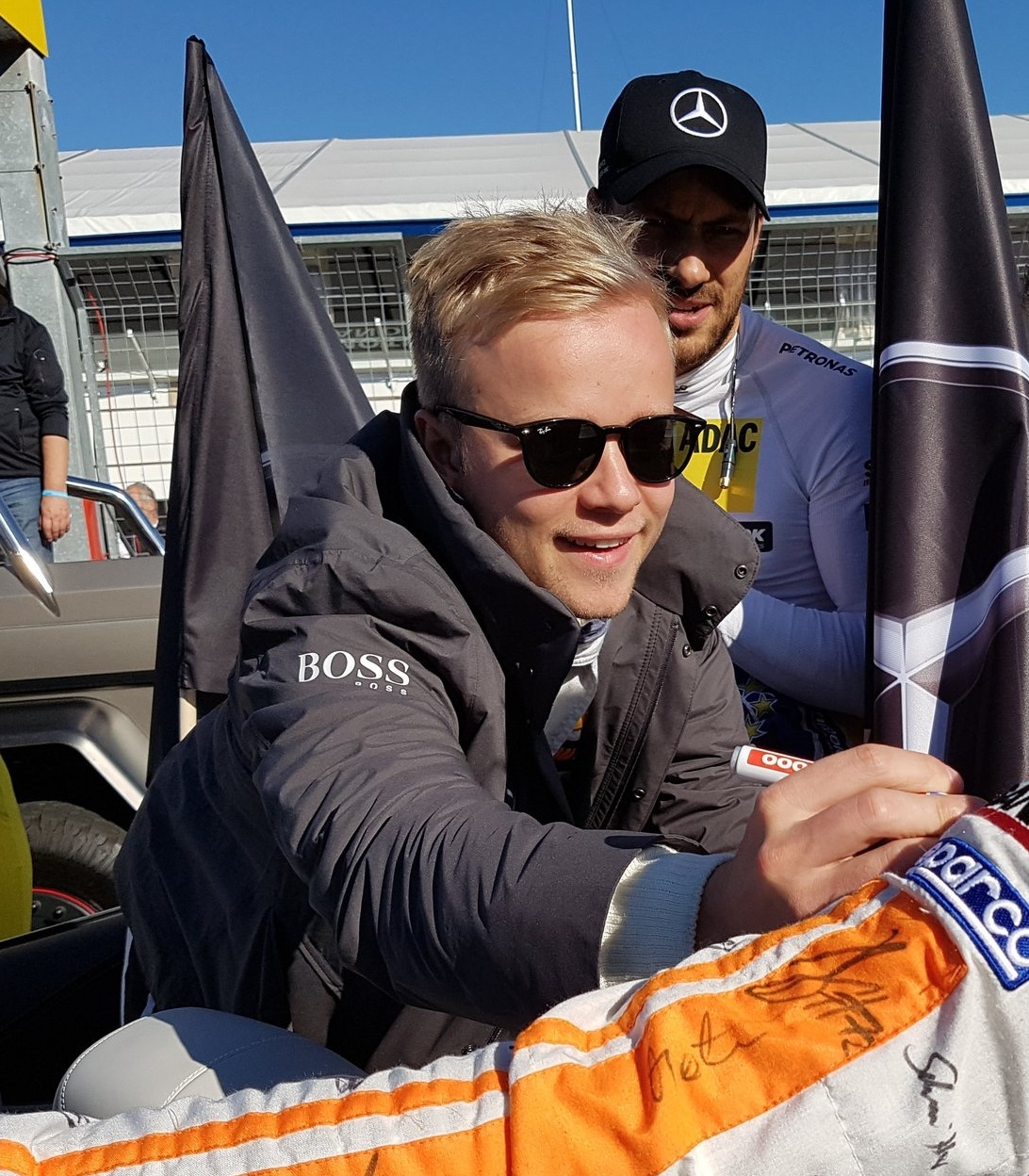
Felix Rosenqvist (pictured in 2016) became the first driver since Edoardo Mortara to win two consecutive editions of the Macau Grand Prix.

All cars were ordered to park in the pit lane while marshals cleared the track of debris. 20 minutes later, the race was restarted behind the safety car. Racing resumed on lap four, with Leclerc leading the field back up to speed. He could not hold off Rosenqvist who retook the lead through the Mandarin Bend while MacLeod used this to pass Leclerc braking for Lisboa turn for third. On the following lap, Sims attempted to line up a pass on Leclerc but could not successfully take third place from him. As Rosenqvist opened up a two-second lead, Leclerc overtook MacLeod on the outside for second at Lisboa corner on lap seven. MacLeod fell out of the top three as he slid his car at Moorish corner and made contact with the wall. MacLeod was forced to limp back to the pit lane to replace a punctured right-rear tyre. At that point in the race, Rosenqvist led Leclerc, Sims, Giovinazzi, Pommer, Ferrucci, Stroll and Lorandi. Soon after, Ilott became the race's final retiree after crashing at Police corner and stopped on the escape road.

The record for the fastest ever lap around the Guia Circuit was surpassed several times with Sette Câmara lowering it to a time of 2 minutes, 10.186 seconds on the final lap. Leclerc reduced Rosenqvist's lead over the rest of the field from about two to 1.1 seconds but he could not get close enough to mount a serious challenge for the win. Thus, Rosenqvist held the lead to claim his second Macau Grand Prix victory, becoming the first driver to win it consecutively since Edoardo Mortara won the 2009 and 2010 races. Lelcerc finished second once again, 1.168 seconds behind, while Sims completed the podium in a repeat of Saturday's top three placings. Off the podium, Giovinazzi gained six places from tenth to finish fourth but could not overtake Sims. Pommer secured fifth with Ferrucci a further five seconds adrift in sixth and Lorandi took seventh. The top ten was rounded out by Prema teammates Stroll and Dennis along with Maini. Outside the top ten, Boccolacci finished 11th and Cassidy closely followed him. Albon, Chang, Yamashita, Sekiguchi, Cao, Solomon, Jensen, MacLeod, Zhi and Sette Câmara were the final classified finishers.

=== Main race classification ===
Final main race classification
Pos	No.	Driver	Team	Laps	Time/Retired	Grid
1	1	(Sweden) Felix Rosenqvist	Prema Powerteam	15	36:25.280	1
2	15	(Monaco) Charles Leclerc	Van Amersfoort Racing	15	+1.168	2
3	30	(United Kingdom) Alexander Sims	Double R Racing	15	+5.075	3
4	7	(Italy) Antonio Giovinazzi	Carlin	15	+5.948	10
5	19	(Germany) Markus Pommer	Motopark	15	+11.703	5
6	24	(United States) Santino Ferrucci	Mücke Motorsport	15	+16.863	7
7	16	(Italy) Alessio Lorandi	Van Amersfoort Racing	15	+18.775	8
8	3	(Canada) Lance Stroll	Prema Powerteam	15	+22.546	13
9	2	(United Kingdom) Jake Dennis	Prema Powerteam	15	+24.355	11
10	27	(India) Arjun Maini	ThreeBond with T-Sport	15	+24.863	9
11	18	(France) Dorian Boccolacci	Signature	15	+28.259	12
12	6	(New Zealand) Nick Cassidy	TOM'S	15	+28.871	17
13	17	(Thailand) Alexander Albon	Signature	15	+30.255	26
14	22	(Macau) Wing Chung Chang	Fortec Motorsport	15	+32.791	18
15	5	(Japan) Kenta Yamashita	TOM'S	15	+33.546	15
16	12	(Japan) Yuhi Sekiguchi	B-Max Engineering	15	+34.154	16
17	23	(China) Martin Cao	Fortec Motorsport	15	+47.075	14
18	31	(Hong Kong) Matt Solomon	Double R Racing	15	+47.369	21
19	25	(Denmark) Mikkel Jensen	Mücke Motorsport	15	+49.240	22
20	29	(United Kingdom) Sam MacLeod	Team West-Tec F3	15	+57.064	4
21	32	(China) Zhi Cong Li	Jo Zeller Racing	15	+1:16.973	28
22	20	(Brazil) Sérgio Sette Câmara	Motopark	15	+2:00.679	6
Ret	10	(United Kingdom) Callum Ilott	Carlin	9	Retired	28
Ret	9	(Japan) Yu Kanamaru	Carlin	8	Retired	20
Ret	8	(United States) Gustavo Menezes	Carlin	0	Retired	19
Ret	11	(Japan) Mitsunori Takaboshi	B-Max Engineering	0	Retired	23
Ret	28	(United States) Ryan Tveter	Team West-Tec F3	0	Retired	27
DNS	21	(Spain) Daniel Juncadella	Fortec Motorsport	—	Did Not Start	^{3}
Fastest lap: (Brazil) Sérgio Sette Câmara, 2:10.186, 169.23 km/h (105.15 mph) on lap 15

Note

- ^3 – Daniel Juncadella did not start the Grand Prix because of damage to the tub of his car.

== See also ==
- 2015 FIA GT World Cup
- 2015 Guia Race of Macau
