= 2014 Macau Grand Prix =

Formula Three motor race

Race details
| Date | 16 November 2014 |
| Official name | 61st Formula Three Suncity Group Macau Grand Prix |
| Location | Guia Circuit, Macau |
| Course | Temporary street circuit 6.120 km (3.803 mi) |
| Distance | Qualifying Race; 10 laps, 61.200 km (38.028 mi); Main Race; 15 laps, 91.800 km (57.042 mi) |
| Weather | Qualifying Race: Sunny; air 24 °C (75 °F), track 38 °C (100 °F); Main Race: Sunny; air 27 °C (81 °F), track 37 °C (99 °F) |
- Qualifying Race

Pole
| Driver | (Sweden) Felix Rosenqvist | Mücke Motorsport |
| Time | 2:11.506 |

Fastest Lap
| Driver | (Sweden) Felix Rosenqvist | Mücke Motorsport |
| Time | 2:12.944 (on lap 4) |

Podium
| First | (Sweden) Felix Rosenqvist | Mücke Motorsport |
| Second | (Austria) Lucas Auer | Mücke Motorsport |
| Third | (United Kingdom) Tom Blomqvist | Jagonya Ayam with Carlin |
- Main Race

Pole
| Driver | (Sweden) Felix Rosenqvist | Mücke Motorsport |

Fastest Lap
| Driver | (Netherlands) Max Verstappen | Van Amersfoort Racing |
| Time | 2:11.748 (on lap 13) |

Podium
| First | (Sweden) Felix Rosenqvist | Mücke Motorsport |
| Second | (Austria) Lucas Auer | Mücke Motorsport |
| Third | (New Zealand) Nick Cassidy | ThreeBond with T-Sport |

The 2014 Macau Grand Prix (formally the 61st Formula Three Suncity Group Macau Grand Prix) was a motor race for Formula Three cars that was held on the streets of Macau on 16 November 2014. Unlike other races, such as the Masters of Formula 3, the 2014 Macau Grand Prix was not a part of any Formula Three championship, but was open to entries from all Formula Three championships. The race itself was made up of two races: a ten-lap qualifying race that decided the starting grid for the fifteen-lap main race. The 2014 race was the 61st running of the Macau Grand Prix and the 32nd for Formula Three cars.

The Grand Prix was won by Mücke Motorsport driver Felix Rosenqvist, having won the event's Qualification Race the previous afternoon. Rosenqvist led the majority of the main race to become the first Swedish driver to win the Grand Prix itself since Rickard Rydell won the 1992 event. His victory also allowed him to become the first person to win the three major Formula Three races – the Macau Grand Prix, the Pau Grand Prix, and the Masters of Formula 3. Second place went to Rosenqvist's teammate Lucas Auer, while the podium was completed by the highest placed rookie driver, Nick Cassidy of ThreeBond with T-Sport.

== Entry list and background ==
The Macau Grand Prix is a Formula Three race considered to be a stepping stone to higher motor racing categories such as Formula One and is Macau's most prestigious international sporting event. The 2014 Macau Grand Prix was the 61st running of the event and the 32nd time that the race was held to Formula Three regulations. It took place on the 6.2 km (3.9 mi) 22-turn Guia Circuit on 16 November 2014 with three preceding days of practice and qualifying.

In order to compete in Macau, drivers had to compete in a Fédération Internationale de l'Automobile (FIA)-regulated championship meeting during the calendar year, in either the FIA Formula Three European Championship or one of the domestic championships, with drivers placed high up in the rankings of these respective championships given priority in receiving an invitation to the meeting. Within the 28-car grid of the event, three of the four major Formula Three series were represented by their respective champion. Esteban Ocon, the FIA Formula Three European champion, was joined in Macau by British champion Martin Cao and German series winner Markus Pommer. All-Japan Formula Three title holder Nobuharu Matsushita did not enter the race and so the highest-placed Japanese series driver in Macau was the runner-up Kenta Yamashita. The entry list included one woman driver, Tatiana Calderón, the first female entrant in Macau since Cathy Muller raced in the 1983 edition. Euroformula Open driver Yu Kanamaru was called up by Carlin as a late replacement for Jake Dennis who opted to withdraw from the race.

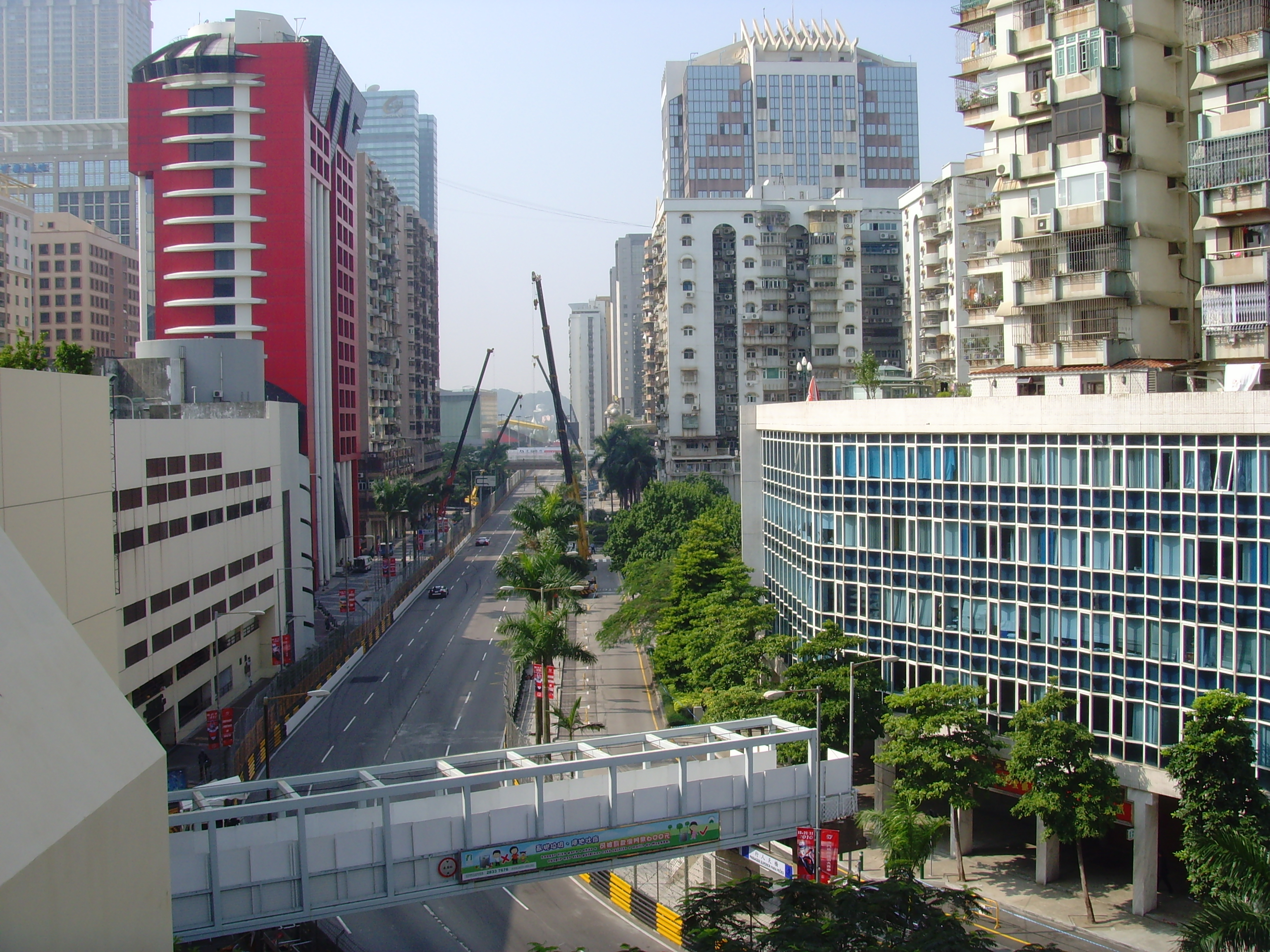
The Guia Circuit, where the race was held

Five drivers who mainly competed in other series outside of Formula Three in 2014 became eligible for the race: Formula Renault 3.5 Series competitor William Buller and GP2 Series driver Stefano Coletti took part in the European Formula Three Championship – at the Autodromo Enzo e Dino Ferrari round, and the season-closing Hockenheimring event respectively in order to become eligible. while Formula Renault 3.5 Series title contender Roberto Merhi competed in the British Formula Three round at Circuit de Spa Francochamps to prepare for Macau. Dan Wells, a Formula Masters China competitor earned qualification for the Macau race by entering the Brands Hatch round of the British Formula Three Championship, and Nick Cassidy of the Eurocup Formula Renault 2.0 became eligible with his participation of the final two events of the European Formula Three Championship.

Preparations for the race began in July, which saw the track repaved over the holiday season and the catch fences installed. After the FIA's race director Charlie Whiting inspected the circuit in August 2014, he suggested to race officials the gate barriers be moved and increased in size to ease traffic congestion and erect protection nets to protect pedestrians in case of an accident. For the first time in the event's history, the Macau Grand Prix Committee imposed an average noise limit level to a maximum of 115 decibels to support environmental initiatives and reduce residential disturbance.

== Practice and qualifying ==
A total of two 45-minute practice sessions preceded the Sunday race: one on Thursday morning and one on Friday morning. Lucas Auer lapped fastest for Theodore Racing by Prema in the opening practice session—which was delayed for one hour to facilitate barrier repairs at Police corner after a support race crash —at 2 minutes, 14.645 seconds. 0.055 seconds faster than any one else. His closest challenger was Antonio Giovinazzi ahead of teammate Tom Blomqvist, Buller, Jordan King, Felix Rosenqvist, Max Verstappen, Nicholas Latifi, Coletti and Sean Gelael. Cao and Gelael made contact at Lisboa corner and Sam MacLeod crashed into the barrier at Police corner. Wells spun into the wall at Fisherman's bend and Mitsunori Takaboshi stopped the session by hitting the Moorish Hill turn barrier. Ocon was caught off guard by the accident and damaged his left-front suspension by swiping Takaboshi's car. Spike Goddard hit the Moorish Hill corner wall in the closing minutes and prevented improvements on drivers' quickest lap times.

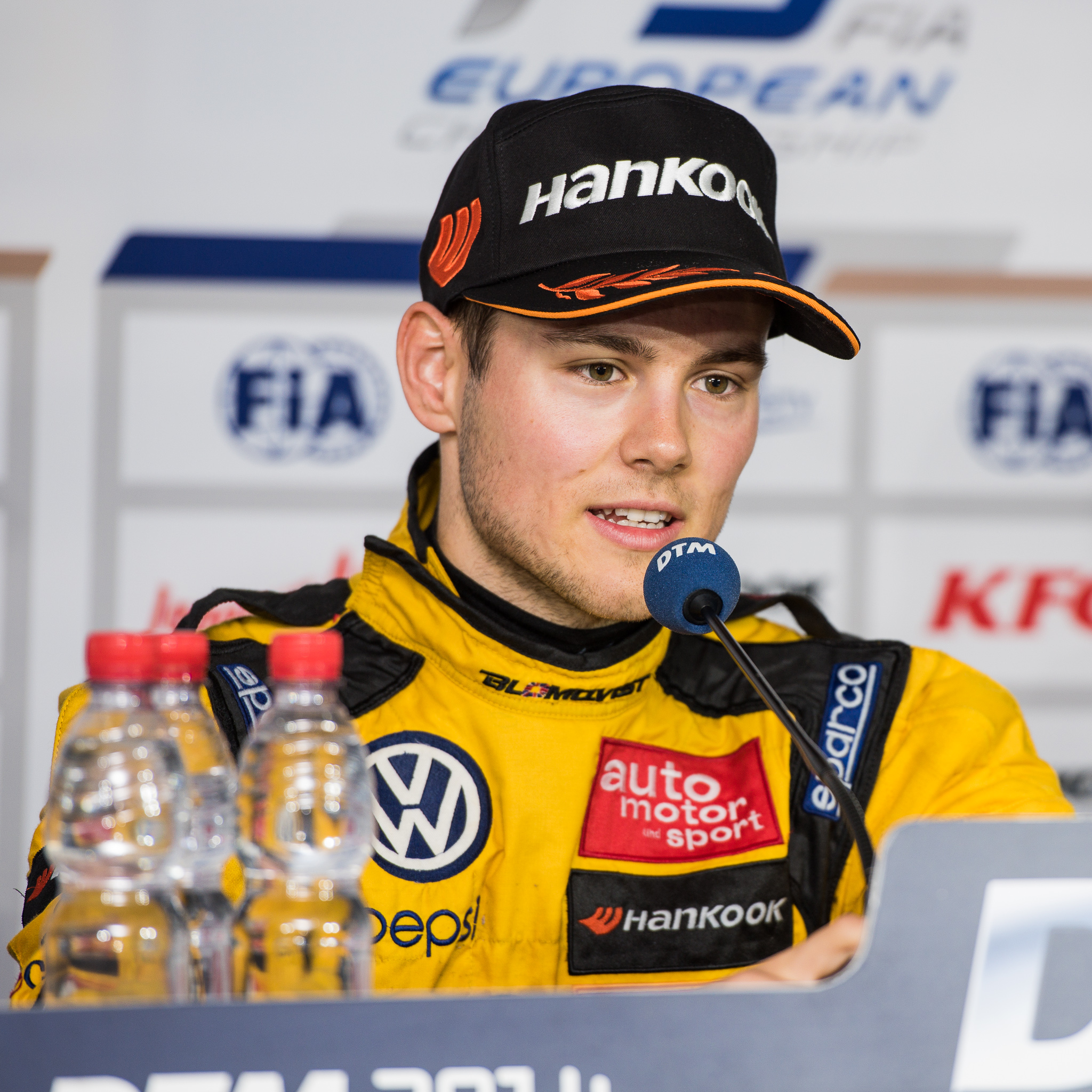
Tom Blomqvist took provisional pole in Thursday qualifying and later ended up starting in third position for the qualifying race.

Qualifying was divided into two sessions; the first was held on Thursday afternoon and ran for 40 minutes with the second held on Friday afternoon and lasted 30 minutes. The fastest time set by each driver from either session counted towards their final starting position for the qualification race. The first qualifying session was delayed by 25 minutes following crashes in practice for the Guia Race of Macau and the CTM Touring Car Cup support races. When the session did start, Blomqvist came out on top with a 2 minutes, 11.922 seconds lap having led most of qualifying, 0.115 seconds faster than Giovinazzi. Cassidy improved late on to be the best placed rookie in third, with Auer in fourth battling Blomqvist early on. King finished fifth on his final timed lap and early leader Verstappen was sixth. Latifi improved late on to place seventh ahead of Buller. Rosenqvist and Ocon—who used two new tyres to begin qualifying—were ninth and tenth. Coletti was the fastest driver not to reach the top ten despite running fifth in qualifying's opening minutes. Following him were Gelael, Antonio Fuoco, Santino Ferrucci, Félix Serrallés, Pommer, Álex Palou, Kanamaru, Merhi and Gustavo Menezes, Yamashita, Goddard, Wells, Cao, Calderón, MacLeod, Wing Chung Chang and Takaboshi. The session passed relatively smoothly with only Cao crashing into the barrier at Fisherman's Bend and Calderón hitting the wall at Police corner. For missing the red light that ordered them to enter the weighbridge in first practice, Ocon and Verstappen were each given two-place grid penalties, and MacLeod was penalised one grid position for illegally crossing the pit exit line.

In the second 45-minute practice session, Rosenqvist set a benchmark time of 2 minutes, 11.743 seconds with around ten minutes to go and held the head to the conclusion of practice. King was nearly three-tenths of a second slower in second. Ocon, Verstappen, Auer, Giovinazzi, Latifi, Coletti, Cassidy and Merhi made up positions four through ten. Fuoco crashed heavily at Fisherman's Bend after ten minutes; a red flag was not necessitated since marshals were able to remove his car from the track. MacLeod was forced to make a pit stop after hitting the barriers on the Mountain Bend. The session ended early when Rosenqvist removed his car's front wing after he hit the wall at Maternity Bend.

At the start of the second qualifying session, multiple yellow flag periods were caused by cars reportedly sliding on oil laid on track by the CTM Touring Car Cup and the GT Cup support races and onto the Lisboa corner run-off area. Auer was qualifying's early pace setter before Ocon, looking to record as fast a time as possible in order to minimise his potential grid loss, moved ahead soon after. Rosenqvist gradually moved up the order before sealing pole position with his final lap of the session at 2 minutes, 11.506 seconds. He was joined on the grid's front row by Auer whose fastest lap was 0.332 seconds slower. Blomqvist in third failed to improve on his quickest time. Ocon and Verstappen's two-place grid penalties moved them from second and third respectively to fourth and fifth. King fell to sixth with Cassidy seventh. Giovinazzi was another driver who failed to improve his best lap and fell to eighth. The top ten was completed by Latifi and Merhi. Behind them the rest of the field lined up as Pommer, Coletti (competing with a broken finger), Gelael, Palou, Buller (ill with food poisoning), Serrallés, Fuoco, Ferrucci, Kanamaru, Cao, Calderón, Goddard, Yamashita, Menezes, Wells, Takaboshi, Chang and MacLeod. The session was twice disrupted: firstly for Coletti who crashed at Police turn and was moved quickly by a recovery crane to allow running to continue unaffected, and secondly for Palou whose crash at the Esses and stoppage at Farway Hill corner soon after caused qualifying to end early with two minutes remaining.

=== Qualifying classification ===
Final qualifying classification
| Pos | No. | Driver | Team | Q1 Time | Rank | Q2 Time | Rank | Gap | Grid |
|---|---|---|---|---|---|---|---|---|---|
| 1 | 20 | (Sweden) Felix Rosenqvist | Mücke Motorsport | 2:12.931 | 9 | 2:11.506 | 1 | — | 1 |
| 2 | 1 | (France) Esteban Ocon | Theodore Racing by Prema | 2:13.028 | 11 | 2:11.742 | 2 | +0.246 | 4^{1} |
| 3 | 5 | (Netherlands) Max Verstappen | Van Amersfoort Racing | 2:12.811 | 6 | 2:11.747 | 3 | +0.251 | 5^{1} |
| 4 | 19 | (Austria) Lucas Auer | Mücke Motorsport | 2:12.621 | 4 | 2:11:838 | 4 | +0.332 | 2 |
| 5 | 14 | (United Kingdom) Tom Blomqvist | Jagonya Ayam with Carlin | 2:11.922 | 1 | 2:12.013 | 5 | +0.416 | 3 |
| 6 | 17 | (United Kingdom) Jordan King | GR Asia with Carlin | 2:12.742 | 5 | 2:11.953 | 5 | +0.447 | 6 |
| 7 | 27 | (New Zealand) Nick Cassidy | ThreeBond with T-Sport | 2:12.546 | 3 | 2:11.979 | 6 | +0.473 | 7 |
| 8 | 15 | (Italy) Antonio Giovinazzi | Jagonya Ayam with Carlin | 2:12.037 | 2 | 2:12,436 | 12 | +0.531 | 8 |
| 9 | 3 | (Canada) Nicholas Latifi | Theodore Racing by Prema | 2:12.839 | 7 | 2:12.067 | 8 | +0.561 | 9 |
| 10 | 28 | (Spain) Roberto Merhi | Double R Racing | 2:14.505 | 19 | 2:12.129 | 9 | +0.623 | 10 |
| 11 | 22 | (Germany) Markus Pommer | Motopark | 2:14.018 | 16 | 2:12.259 | 10 | +0.753 | 11 |
| 12 | 29 | (Monaco) Stefano Coletti | EuroInternational | 2:13.066 | 11 | 2:12.429 | 11 | +0.923 | 12 |
| 13 | 16 | (Indonesia) Sean Gelael | Jagonya Ayam with Carlin | 2:13.173 | 12 | 2:12.524 | 13 | +1.018 | 13 |
| 14 | 11 | (Spain) Álex Palou | Fortec Motorsports | 2:14.411 | 17 | 2:12.631 | 14 | +1.125 | 14 |
| 15 | 31 | (United Kingdom) William Buller | Signature | 2:12.871 | 8 | 2:13.255 | 17 | +1;366 | 15 |
| 16 | 23 | (Puerto Rico) Félix Serrallés | Team West-Tec F3 | 2:14.000 | 15 | 2:12.952 | 15 | +1.446 | 16 |
| 17 | 2 | (Italy) Antonio Fuoco | Theodore Racing by Prema | 2:13.867 | 13 | 2:13.066 | 16 | +1.569 | 17 |
| 18 | 10 | (United States) Santino Ferrucci | Fortec Motorsports | 2:13.944 | 14 | 2:13.581 | 18 | +2.075 | 18 |
| 19 | 18 | (Japan) Yu Kanamaru | Carlin | 2:14.468 | 18 | 2:13.731 | 19 | +2.225 | 19 |
| 20 | 9 | (China) Martin Cao | Fortec Motorsports | 2:16.919 | 24 | 2:14.112 | 20 | +2.606 | 20 |
| 21 | 21 | (Colombia) Tatiana Calderón | Mücke Motorsport | 2:16.975 | 25 | 2:14:112 | 21 | +2.606 | 21 |
| 22 | 26 | (Australia) Spike Goddard | ThreeBond with T-Sport | 2:15.672 | 22 | 2:14.122 | 22 | +2.616 | 22 |
| 23 | 7 | (Japan) Kenta Yamashita | TOM'S | 2:15.144 | 21 | 2:14:471 | 23 | +2.965 | 23 |
| 24 | 6 | (United States) Gustavo Menezes | Van Amersfoort Racing | 2:14.801 | 20 | 2:14.555 | 24 | +3.049 | 24 |
| 25 | 30 | (United Kingdom) Dan Wells | Toda Racing | 2:16.569 | 23 | 2:15.373 | 25 | +3.869 | 25 |
| 26 | 12 | (Japan) Mitsunori Takaboshi | B-Max Engineering | 2:19.157 | 28 | 2:15.974 | 26 | +4.468 | 26 |
| 27 | 25 | (Macau) Wing Chung Chang | Team West-Tec F3 | 2:17.597 | 27 | 2:16.135 | 27 | +4.629 | 27 |
| 28 | 8 | (United Kingdom) Sam MacLeod | TOM'S | 2:17.516 | 26 | 2:16.859 | 28 | +5.353 | 28^{2} |
110% qualifying time:2:24.656
Bold time indicates the faster of the two times that determined the grid order.

Notes:

^1 – Esteban Ocon and Max Verstappen were penalised two places on the grid for missing the red light that ordered them to enter the weighbridge.
^2 – Sam MacLeod was handed a one-place grid penalty for illegally crossing the pit exit line.

== Qualifying race ==
The qualifying race to set the grid order for the main race started at 13:45 Macau Standard Time (UTC+08:00) on 15 November. The weather at the start was dry and sunny with the air temperature 24 °C (75 °F) and the track temperature 38 °C (100 °F). At the start, Auer accelerated faster than Rosenqvist off the line and slipstreamed up behind his teammate and moved into the lead before entering Mandarin Oriental corner. Verstappen made a fast getaway and moved from fifth to second. Pommer stalled on the grid when the race started and fell to the rear of the pack. Further down the field, Giovinazzi was knocked off his line and hit a barrier at Mandarin Oriental. The momentum of the incident caused Giovinazzi to make contact with Palou at Lisboa turn. As Giovinazzi slid violently across the circuit, he hit Gelael, who made an unscheduled pit stop and Buller did the same after sustaining car damage. Merhi made a brisk start and was sixth by the end of the first lap. He got involved in a battle between Blomqvist and Ocon for fourth. Rosenqvist attacked Verstappen but the latter blocked him from passing into Lisboa corner.

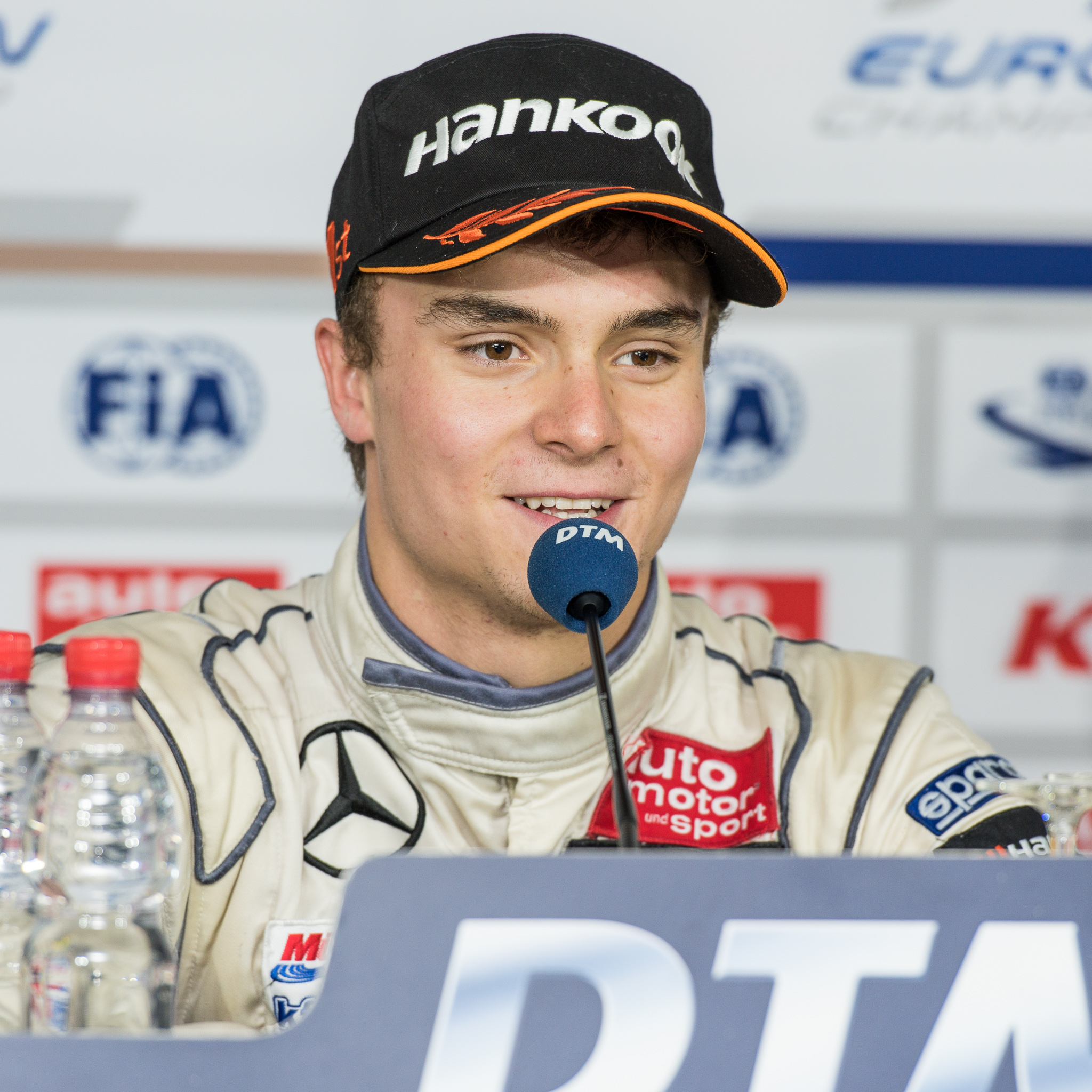
Lucas Auer led the first seven laps of the qualifying race but eventually settled for second position.

Rosenqvist tried passing Verstappen for a second time entering Lisboa corner but the latter again held his position. Auer now held a two-second advantage over the rest of the field, with the hope that no accidents would occur that would necessitate the safety car's deployment. However, this would not happen as on the fourth lap, Verstappen lost control of his vehicle under braking in the Solitude Esses. He broke his front-left suspension in an impact with a wall after a rear brake locking meant he missed the apex by approximately 3 cm (1.2 in). This caused the wheel to dangle off the car and he sustained a rear-left puncture. Verstappen lost all turning room while attempting to get round the Melco hairpin but retired in the pit lane. In the group behind King overtook Latifi while Fuoco and Serrallés drew closer to Coletti. The safety car was required on the same lap when MacLeod crashed and blocked half the track at Paiol corner since no recovery cranes were in the area. Confusion was created under the safety car when it did not pick up race leader Auer but Goddard instead. Gelael retired to the pit lane to stop himself impeding other drivers. The safety car drove into the pit lane on lap seven and racing resumed with Auer leading Rosenqvist.

Auer was aware Rosenqvist would trouble him; while Rosenqvist flat-spotted his front-left tyre during his battle with Verstappen, he slipstreamed onto the back of his teammate and steered onto the outside through turn one and overtook Auer for the lead. Further down the field, Cassidy passed Merhi to move into fifth. Blomqvist resisted a pass from Ocon to maintain third, while Latifi retook seventh from King and Coletti lost ninth to Serrallés. Rosenqvist quickly built up a one and a half-second lead over teammate Auer who then lowered it to nine-tenths of a second, but Rosenqvist maintained the lead for the rest of the qualifying race to win and claim the pole position for the Grand Prix itself. Blomqvist fended off further attacks from Ocon to clinch third. Cassidy was fifth and Merhi sixth. Behind the trio, Latifi, King, Serrallés and Coletti followed in positions seven to ten. Outside the top ten, Fuoco took 11th ahead of Ferrucci. The Japanese duo of Kanamaru and Yamashita, Menezes, Calderón, Cao, Goddard, Pommer, Takaboshi, Chang and Wells rounded out the classified finishers. Buller finished but was not classified as he was two laps behind the winner.

=== Qualifying race classification ===
Final qualification race classification
| Pos | No. | Driver | Team | Laps | Time/Retired | Grid |
|---|---|---|---|---|---|---|
| 1 | 20 | (Sweden) Felix Rosenqvist | Mücke Motorsport | 10 | 27:11.512 | 1 |
| 2 | 19 | (Austria) Lucas Auer | Mücke Motorsport | 10 | +0.935 | 2 |
| 3 | 14 | (United Kingdom) Tom Blomqvist | Jagonya Ayam with Carlin | 10 | +2.494 | 3 |
| 4 | 1 | (France) Esteban Ocon | Theodore Racing by Prema | 10 | +3.657 | 4 |
| 5 | 27 | (New Zealand) Nick Cassidy | ThreeBond with T-Sport | 10 | +4.544 | 7 |
| 6 | 28 | (Spain) Roberto Merhi | Double R Racing | 10 | +6.650 | 10 |
| 7 | 3 | (Canada) Nicholas Latifi | Theodore Racing by Prema | 10 | +7.429 | 9 |
| 8 | 17 | (United Kingdom) Jordan King | GR Asia with Carlin | 10 | +7.857 | 6 |
| 9 | 23 | (Puerto Rico) Félix Serrallés | Team West-Tec F3 | 10 | +8.419 | 16 |
| 10 | 29 | (Monaco) Stefano Coletti | EuroInternational | 10 | +9.391 | 12 |
| 11 | 2 | (Italy) Antonio Fuoco | Theodore Racing by Prema | 10 | +10.705 | 17 |
| 12 | 10 | (United States) Santino Ferrucci | Fortec Motorsports | 10 | +11.730 | 18 |
| 13 | 18 | (Japan) Yu Kanamaru | Carlin | 10 | +12.437 | 19 |
| 14 | 7 | (Japan) Kenta Yamashita | TOM'S | 10 | +14.010 | 23 |
| 15 | 6 | (United States) Gustavo Menezes | Van Amersfoort Racing | 10 | +15.027 | 24 |
| 16 | 21 | (Colombia) Tatiana Calderón | Mücke Motorsport | 10 | +16.114 | 21 |
| 17 | 9 | (China) Martin Cao | Fortec Motorsports | 10 | +17.198 | 20 |
| 18 | 26 | (Australia) Spike Goddard | ThreeBond with T-Sport | 10 | +18.721 | 22 |
| 19 | 22 | (Germany) Markus Pommer | Motopark | 10 | +19.683 | 11 |
| 20 | 12 | (Japan) Mitsunori Takaboshi | B-Max Engineering | 10 | +21.925 | 26 |
| 21 | 25 | (Macau) Wing Chung Chang | Team West-Tec F3 | 10 | +25.016 | 27 |
| 22 | 30 | (United Kingdom) Dan Wells | Toda Racing | 10 | +25.267 | 25 |
| NC | 31 | (United Kingdom) William Buller | Signature | 8 | +2 Laps | 15 |
| Ret | 5 | (Netherlands) Max Verstappen | Van Amersfoort Racing | 4 | Accident | 5 |
| Ret | 16 | (Indonesia) Sean Gelael | Jagonya Ayam with Carlin | 4 | Accident damage | 13 |
| Ret | 8 | (United Kingdom) Sam MacLeod | TOM'S | 3 | Accident | 28 |
| Ret | 15 | (Italy) Antonio Giovinazzi | Jagonya Ayam with Carlin | 0 | Collision | 7 |
| Ret | 11 | (Spain) Álex Palou | Fortec Motorsports | 0 | Collision | 14 |
Fastest lap: Felix Rosenqvist, 2:12.944, 165.724 km/h (102.976 mph) on lap 4

== Main race ==
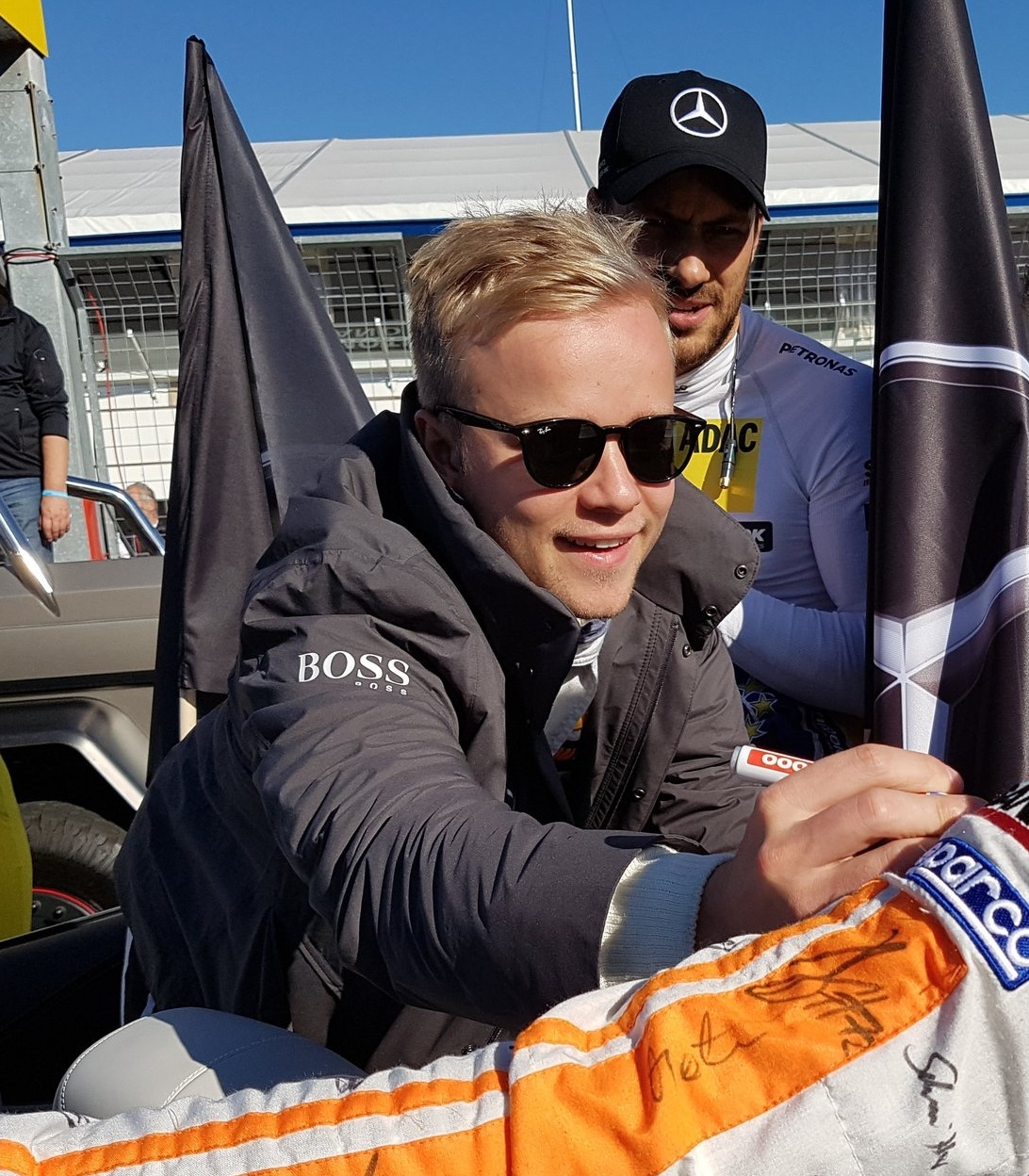
Felix Rosenqvist (pictured in 2016) won his maiden Macau Grand Prix at the fifth attempt and became the first driver to win all three major Formula Three races.

The weather at the beginning of the race was dry and sunny with the air temperature of 27 °C (81 °F) and the track temperature at 37 °C (99 °F). When it began from its standing start at 15:30 local time on 16 November, Auer moved into the lead into Lisboa corner for the second day running from the slow-starting Rosenqvist whom Blomqvist and Ocon overtook to demote him to fourth. Blomqvist and Ocon were alongside Auer on both sides of the track, but Auer braked too late and left space for cars behind to pass through by running wide onto the run-off area. Blomqvist took avoiding action when he steered to take the corner but made contact with Ocon's wheel at the turn's apex. Ocon's front-left suspension was deranged and he understeered into the San Francisco Bend barrier taking Blomqvist with him. Ocon's car protruded across the circuit, but drivers such as Rosenqvist, Auer and Cassidy passed by safely. This triggered a multi-car pileup that started when King braked too late and Kanamaru was launched airborne over his teammate's car. Kanamaru landed on top of a wall with his right-rear wheel inches from striking Ocon's helmet.

Buller, Verstappen, Chang, Cao, Goddard were also caught up in the incident. Additionally, one of Pommer's front wheels dangled off its suspension rod and Fuoco appeared to have sustained bodywork damage. Merhi switched to a worn tyre as he sustained a puncture on carbonfibre shrapnel. Since the track was blocked with multiple cars stranded, the race was stopped. Several cars were repaired by their teams to allow their drivers to continue racing. The cars of Ocon, Blomqvist, Cao, Goddard and Kanamaru were too heavily damaged and were retired. 70 minutes later, the race was restarted behind the safety car. Fuoco chose to drive into the pit lane since his team repaired the front of his car until the last minute before the restart. The safety car was withdrawn after two laps and racing resumed with Rosenqvist leading teammate Auer. Auer slipstreamed onto the back of Rosenqvist and passed him into Lisboa corner for the lead. However Auer again out-braked himself and ran deep at the turn. Cassidy took advantage to claim third. On the same lap, King lost sixth to Coletti, Wells overtook Cheng for 15th and Verstappen passed Buller.

"For once in my life I’m completely out of words. It's fantastic. And after this year which has been my hardest season so far. Only 8th in the European championship so this was my last shot and everything ended well. This time luck was with me and the car was quick I’ve been haunted by bad luck but now everything has come good for me. Unbelievable. Honestly I don't remember what happened in the race right now, maybe in one or two hours. I like street circuits and this is special. I’ve never won the European championship but to win the big ones (Pau, Zandvoort and Macau) is very special.”

— Felix Rosenqvist, on winning his first Macau Grand Prix at the fifth attempt.

Soon after, King was another retiree as he parked his car two laps after the restart with a punctured tyre, while Serrallés drove slowly to the pit lane to replace a dislodged front wing. Further back, Verstappen advanced through the field to eleventh. He drew closer to Calderón ahead of him for a top-ten placing. At the front, Rosenqvist led Cassidy by more than four seconds, as Auer pressured the latter. However Auer could not take advantage of Cassidy's handicap and the latter pulled clear. At the end, Cassidy glanced the wall with the rear of his car, and lost time in the track's final sector. Auer slipstreamed up to the rear of Cassidy and temporarily moved into second on lap 13. He ran wide at Lisboa corner for a third time, allowing Cassidy back through to second. Auer retook the position later in the lap. Cassidy opted not to challenge Auer and refocused himself on the closing Merhi. On lap 11, Fuoco was retired by his team due to brake issues.

Despite car floor damage and an oil leak, Verstappen's pace allowed him to overtake teammate Menezes, Yamashita into Lisboa corner and Ferrucci settled for seventh. Merhi lacked straightline speed and pushed hard at the R Bend in an effort to cling onto Cassidy's slipstream but defended from Latifi after an error. On his fifth appearance at Macau, it was Rosenqvist's victory, achieving the first win for a Swedish driver in the Grand Prix since Rickard Rydell won the 1992 race. Rosenqvist was the first driver to win the three main Formula Three races – the Macau Grand Prix, the Pau Grand Prix and the Masters of Formula 3. Auer finished second, 4.372 seconds later and Cassidy completed the podium on his debut in Macau. Off the podium, Merhi took fourth and fended off an late-race attack from fifth-placed Latifi. Coletti was a distant sixth and made contact with the Mandarin Bend wall on the first lap. Verstappen was close behind in seventh. The top ten was completed by Ferrucci, Yamashita and Menezes. Outside the top ten, Pommer finished 11th having moved up eight from his starting position, and was ahead of Giovinazzi. Calderón, Buller, Gelael, Palou, Wells, Takaboshi, Chang, MacLeod and Serrallés were the last of the classified finishers.

=== Main race classification ===
Final main race classification
| Pos | No. | Driver | Team | Laps | Time/Retired | Grid |
|---|---|---|---|---|---|---|
| 1 | 20 | (Sweden) Felix Rosenqvist | Mücke Motorsport | 15 | 1:08.46.691 | 1 |
| 2 | 19 | (Austria) Lucas Auer | Mücke Motorsport | 15 | +4.372 | 2 |
| 3 | 27 | (New Zealand) Nick Cassidy | ThreeBond with T-Sport | 15 | +8.999 | 5 |
| 4 | 28 | (Spain) Roberto Merhi | Double R Racing | 15 | +9.799 | 6 |
| 5 | 3 | (Canada) Nicholas Latifi | Theodore Racing by Prema | 15 | +10.413 | 7 |
| 6 | 29 | (Monaco) Stefano Coletti | EuroInternational | 15 | +24.000 | 10 |
| 7 | 5 | (Netherlands) Max Verstappen | Van Amersfoort Racing | 15 | +24.455 | 24 |
| 8 | 10 | (United States) Santino Ferrucci | Fortec Motorsports | 15 | +31.081 | 12 |
| 9 | 7 | (Japan) Kenta Yamashita | TOM'S | 15 | +34.334 | 14 |
| 10 | 8 | (United States) Gustavo Menezes | Van Amersfoort Racing | 15 | +35.246 | 15 |
| 11 | 22 | (Germany) Markus Pommer | Motopark | 15 | +36.576 | 19 |
| 12 | 15 | (Italy) Antonio Giovinazzi | Jagonya Ayam with Carlin | 15 | +37.319 | 27 |
| 13 | 21 | (Colombia) Tatiana Calderón | Mücke Motorsport | 15 | +41.930 | 16 |
| 14 | 31 | (United Kingdom) William Buller | Signature | 15 | +43.986 | 23 |
| 15 | 16 | (Indonesia) Sean Gelael | Jagonya Ayam with Carlin | 15 | +44.972 | 25 |
| 16 | 11 | (Spain) Álex Palou | Fortec Motorsports | 15 | +48.063 | 28 |
| 17 | 30 | (United Kingdom) Dan Wells | Toda Racing | 15 | +52.724 | 22 |
| 18 | 12 | (Japan) Mitsunori Takaboshi | B-Max Engineering | 15 | +57.034 | 20 |
| 19 | 25 | (Macau) Wing Chung Chang | Team West-Tec F3 | 15 | +1:08.334 | 21 |
| 20 | 8 | (United Kingdom) Sam MacLeod | TOM'S | 15 | +1:49.990 | 26 |
| 21 | 23 | (Puerto Rico) Félix Serrallés | Team West-Tec F3 | 15 | +2:14.441 | 9 |
| Ret | 2 | (Italy) Antonio Fuoco | Theodore Racing by Prema | 11 | Brakes | 11 |
| Ret | 17 | (United Kingdom) Jordan King | GR Asia with Carlin | 4 | Puncture | 8 |
| Ret | 14 | (United Kingdom) Tom Blomqvist | Jagonya Ayam with Carlin | 0 | Collision | 3 |
| Ret | 1 | (France) Esteban Ocon | Theodore Racing by Prema | 0 | Collision | 4 |
| Ret | 9 | (China) Martin Cao | Fortec Motorsports | 0 | Collision | 17 |
| Ret | 18 | (Japan) Yu Kanamaru | Carlin | 0 | Collision | 13 |
| Ret | 26 | (Australia) Spike Goddard | ThreeBond with T-Sport | 0 | Collision | 18 |
Fastest lap: Max Verstappen, 2:11.748, 167.228 km/h (103.911 mph), on lap 13

== See also ==
- 2014 Guia Race of Macau
