= Hélio Castroneves =

Brazilian racing driver (born 1975)

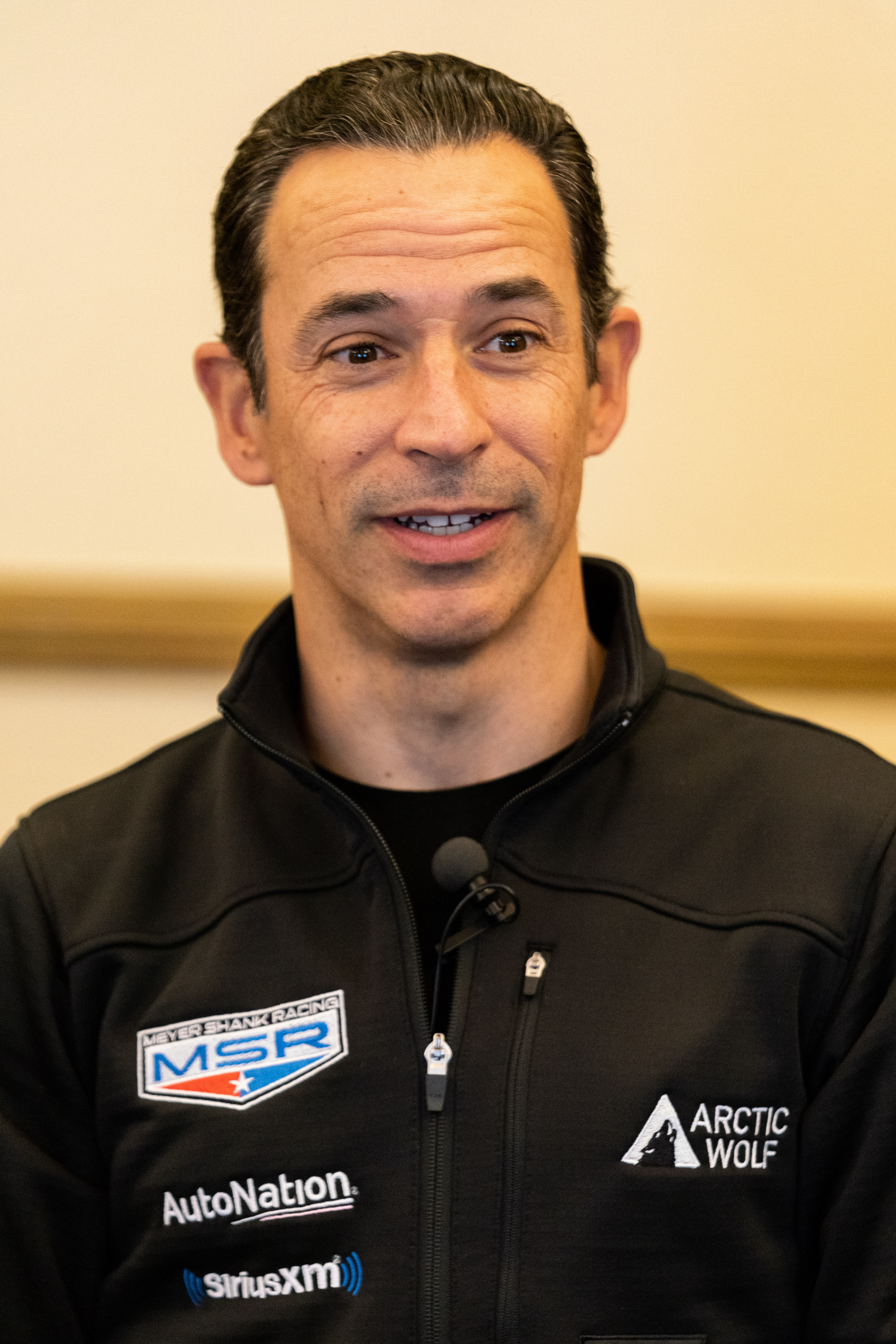
- Castroneves in 2022
- Nationality: Brazilian
- Born: Hélio Alves de Castro Neves; 10 May 1975 (age 51) Ribeirão Preto, São Paulo, Brazil
- Categorisation: FIA Platinum

IndyCar Series career
- 316 races run over 25 years
- Team: No. 06 (Meyer Shank Racing)
- Best finish: 2nd (2002, 2008, 2013, 2014)
- First race: 2001 Pennzoil Copper World Indy 200 (Phoenix)
- Last race: 2026 Indianapolis 500 (Indianapolis)
- First win: 2001 Indianapolis 500 (Indianapolis)
- Last win: 2021 Indianapolis 500 (Indianapolis)
Wins	Podiums	Poles
25	84	48

Champ Car career
- 79 races run over 4 years
- Years active: 1998–2001
- Teams: Bettenhausen Racing; Hogan Racing; Team Penske
- Best finish: 4th (2001)
- First race: 1998 Marlboro Grand Prix of Miami (Homestead)
- Last race: 2001 Marlboro 500 (Fontana)
- First win: 2000 Tenneco Automotive Grand Prix of Detroit (Belle Isle)
- Last win: 2001 Miller Lite 200 (Mid-Ohio)
Wins	Podiums	Poles
6	10	7

Previous series
- 1993–1994 1995 1996–1997: Formula 3 Sudamericana; British Formula Three Championship; Indy Lights

Championship titles
- IMSA SportsCar Championship DPi class (2020); Major victories; Indianapolis 500 (2001, 2002, 2009, 2021); 24 Hours of Daytona (2021, 2022, 2023); Petit Le Mans (2022, 2023)

NASCAR Cup Series career
- 1 race run over 1 year
- 2025 position: 61st
- Best finish: 61st (2025)
- First race: 2025 Daytona 500 (Daytona)
Wins	Top tens	Poles
0	0	0

ARCA Menards Series career
- 1 race run over 1 year
- Best finish: 93rd (2025)
- First race: 2025 Ride the 'Dente 200 (Daytona)
Wins	Top tens	Poles
0	1	0
- Statistics up to date as of November 6, 2025.

Hélio Castroneves (Portuguese pronunciation: [ˈɛlju ˈkastɾu ˈnɛvis]; born Hélio Alves de Castro Neves; 10 May 1975) is a Brazilian auto racing driver. He currently competes in the Stock Car Pro Series for Mercado Livre Racing and competes part-time in the IndyCar Series, driving the No. 06 Dallara-Honda for Meyer Shank Racing.

Castroneves is one of four drivers to have won the Indianapolis 500 a record four times: in 2001, 2002, 2009, and 2021. He was runner-up in the IndyCar Series drivers' championship in 2002, 2008, 2013, and 2014. He has also competed in the IMSA SportsCar Championship, where he won the overall championship in 2020 with Team Penske. He is a three-time winner of the 24 Hours of Daytona, consecutively in 2021 with Wayne Taylor Racing and 2022 and 2023 with Meyer Shank, and won Petit Le Mans two times.

Castroneves began competitive go-karting at age 10, before progressing to car racing, in the Formula Chevrolet Brazil, Formula 3 Sudamericana, the British Formula Three Championship, and Indy Lights. He entered Championship Auto Racing Teams (CART) in 1998 with Bettenhausen Racing and with Hogan Racing in 1999, achieving one second place each with both teams. Castroneves moved to Team Penske in place of Greg Moore for 2000 and 2001, winning three races in both years.

Castroneves debuted in the Indy Racing League (IRL) in 2001, competing in two races for Penske and winning the Indianapolis 500. Castroneves drove full time in the IRL from 2002, winning the Indy 500 for a second straight year and finishing runner-up to Sam Hornish Jr. in the championship. He finished third in 2003 and 2006 and was runner-up to Scott Dixon in 2008. During the 2009 season, he won the Indianapolis 500 for the third time and finished fourth in the points standings. He was fourth again in two of the next three seasons, before coming second to Dixon in 2013 and his Penske teammate Will Power in 2014. Castroneves achieved one further series win in 2017 before leaving full-time IndyCar racing to make his IMSA SportsCar Championship debut with Penske at the 2017 Petit Le Mans, paired with Ricky Taylor. He won one race and finished seventh in the 2018 Prototype standings and improved to third with five podiums in 2019. In 2020, he would win four races en route to his first auto racing title.

One of the most popular drivers in IndyCar, Castroneves's celebration of climbing the fencing beside the track after a victory, would earn him the nickname "Spider-Man". Castroneves has represented IndyCar in the International Race of Champions series, the Race of Champions event, and the Superstar Racing Experience. Among other media appearances, Castroneves won the fifth season of Dancing with the Stars with professional dancer Julianne Hough.

== Early and personal life ==
Castroneves was born in São Paulo, Brazil on 10 May 1975, to automobile dealer Hélio Castro Neves and former school teacher Sandra Alves de Castro Neves. He has an elder sister, Katiucia, who is his business manager. In 1977, the family moved to Ribeirão Preto, an agroindustrial town about 150 mi (240 km) northwest of São Paulo, to allow his father to find business in the region's thriving ethanol processing industry. He was educated in the São Paulo school system. In 2000, he changed his surname from Castro Neves to Castroneves to stop the media misidentifying him as "Helio Neves" or "Helio Castro". Castroneves has a daughter with his long-time partner Adriana Henao.

== Karting career ==
From early 1981 to 1986, Castroneves observed his father's minor stock car team race on weekends by being sneaked into a car's trunk in racing overalls and helmet, allowing him into a circuit. (Note: Since the minimum age of admittance to a Brazilian race track was sixteen, Castroneves hid between his father, another karter and equipment to prevent circuit officials from spotting him.) At age seven, he was given a child-sized motorized car for frequent driving on the streets of his gated community and asked his father about a go-kart. On his 11th birthday, Castroneves received his first go-kart from race car driver Alfredo Guaraná Menezes, and began driving at a karting track in São Paulo. His mother disliked racing, urging him to focus on schooling and enrolling him in less dangerous sports, such as association football, judo, swimming, tennis, and volleyball. Castroneves played those sports infrequently before telling his mother he wanted to focus on racing. He was inspired by Ayrton Senna, a three-time Formula One world champion.

His father enrolled him in the Karting State Championships in São Paulo in early 1987. Castroneves won his first trophy mid-year by bettering himself, as his father sold his Rio de Janeiro property to establish and finance a karting team around his son. At the age of thirteen, he was taken off full-time schooling to learn more about karting from his father and team members. Castroneves' mother disapproved because she believed he could opt to stop karting and was fearful of him not having a backup career. Castroneves won the 1989 Brazilian National Go-Kart Championship at the age of fourteen. Around this time, he and his family began watching Championship Auto Racing Teams (CART) and Formula One racing on television. From October 1989 to March 1990, Castroneves did weightlifting and played tennis to improve his physique.

In 1990, Castroneves forfeited the Brazilian National Go-Kart Championship and flew to Italy to enter the Karting World Cup to acquaint himself with the more powerful and grippier European go-karts. A mix-up of his registration papers with the Confederação Brasileira de Automobilismo (English: Brazilian Autosport Confederation) and talks with the Commission Internationale de Karting in Switzerland prevented him from entering until a fellow karter sustained an arm injury. Castroneves finished the race sixteenth. He raced in the 1991 Karting World Cup in France without registration trouble, finishing 25th, and won more races in Brazil.

== Junior car racing career ==
Aged 16 in late 1991, Castroneves progressed into car racing, competing in Formula Chevrolet Brazil, a series for finishing go-karters. His parents hired a trainer to help him lift weights for better car control and took him to a local recreational center. Negotiations to drive for the Arisco team fell through when it asked for $200,000 in sponsorship, causing his father to spend $250,000 on his team. Driving a Copral-Berta-Chevrolet car, Castroneves was championship runner-up with one victory and 92 points in the eight-round season. He moved to the higher-tier Formula 3 (F3) Sudamericana in 1993 driving a Ralt RT34-Mugen Honda car with Copral and later the funded Amir Nasr Racing Team. (Note: A test for the Cesário Fórmula team did not lead to a drive because it asked for $250,000 in sponsorship.) Castroneves' five-year-old car was worn and had no aerial to communicate to his team by radio. (Note: Castroneves' father relayed instructions to him via placards attached to a pipe.) He was championship runner-up to Argentinean driver Fernando Croceri with four victories, eight podium finishes and 57 points. (Note: Castroneves lost the championship when four drivers behind him stopped on track during the final lap of the season-ending race to allow Croceri into second and claim the title for himself.)

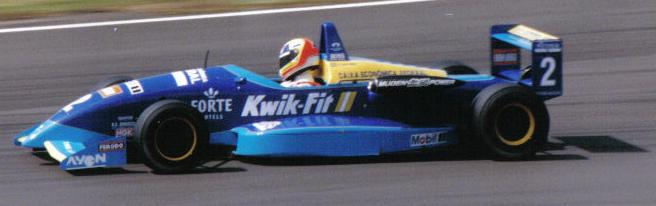
Castroneves driving for Paul Stewart Racing at the Silverstone Circuit round of the 1995 British Formula Three Championship

Castroneves progressed to the Brazilian Formula Three Championship in 1994 with the Amir Nasr Racing Team, finishing second overall with three victories, four pole positions and 52 points from eight races. For 1995, Castroneves drove a Dallara F395-Mugen Honda car for Paul Stewart Racing in the British Formula Three Championship. His father obtained sponsorship from a Brazilian bank, and mid-way through 1995, sold his business assets, private company and Katicia's university apartment to help finance his son's career. Castroneves was third in the drivers' championship with 169 points, six podiums and a win at Donington Park. He finished third in the Masters of Formula 3 at Circuit Zandvoort and crashed out of the Macau Grand Prix.

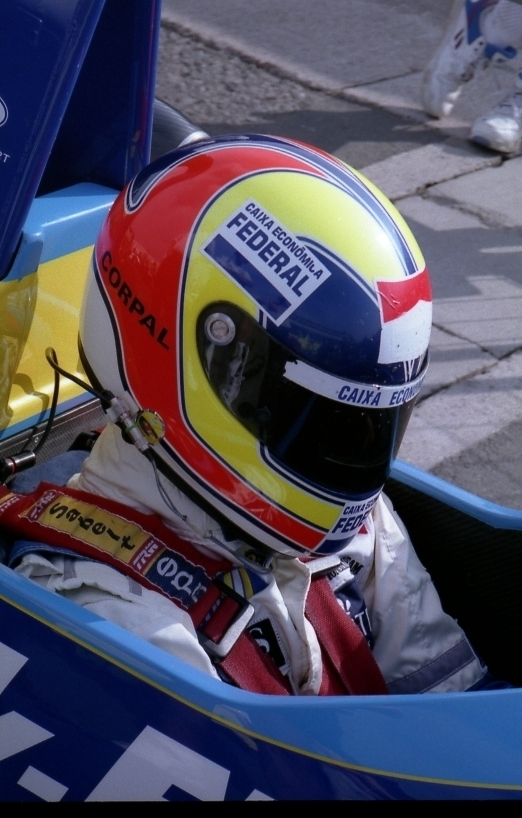
Helio Castro Neves, Paul Stewart Racing, British F3, Donington, 1995

In November 1995, a Philip Morris International executive asked Castroneves whether he wanted to enter a four-day Indy Lights (CART's developmental series) test session at Phoenix International Raceway's oval track against nine other drivers. Although he did not finish the test due to exhaustion, he signed to drive Tasman Motorsports' third car with partial funding from the team and the rest from a corporate sponsor after another year in F3 was financially unfeasible. Driving the No. 8 Lola T93/20-Buick car in the 1996 season, Castroneves won at Circuit Trois-Rivières and achieved seven top-tens for seventh overall with 84 points. A series of accidents and Castroneves' lack of English frustrated him, and he briefly spoke to a sports psychologist for help mid-season. (Note: Castroneves had lost enough confidence that he told his parents he wanted to stop racing but was encouraged by both of them to continue. The sports psychologist gave him a rubber band to be worn around his wrist and snap it if he felt negative.)

For the 1997 season, Castroneves remained at Tasman Motorsport, but was told his sponsor was leaving, forcing Katicia to promote him to several Brazilian companies. He and team owner Steve Horne agreed if he won five races, Horne would retain all prize monies until Castroneves paid him what he was owed, effectively driving for free. Driving the No. 29 Lola T97/20-Buick car, Castroneves was championship runner-up to teammate Tony Kanaan, winning three of the twelve races, six top tens, four pole positions, and 152 points. On 11 June 1997, the two-time Indianapolis 500 winner Emerson Fittipaldi became Castroneves' manager and sponsorship finder.

== CART ==
=== 1998–1999 ===
In January 1998, Bettenhausen Racing owner Tony Bettenhausen Jr. invited him to test for his CART team at Sebring International Raceway; Castroneves signed to drive its No. 16 Reynard 98I-Mercedes-Benz car in the 1998 season, and was assigned former Penske Racing employee Tom Brown as his race engineer. During practice for the season-opening Grand Prix of Miami at Homestead–Miami Speedway, Castroneves sustained a sore head in an accident but medical officials cleared him to race. Castroneves achieved his first career top-ten finish in CART, a ninth at the Grand Prix of Long Beach, followed by a season-high second in the Miller 200 at Milwaukee Mile. He was seventeenth in the drivers' championship with 36 points, and was second to Kanaan in the Rookie of the Year standings.

In mid-1998, Chip Ganassi Racing (CGR) wanted Castroneves to replace the Formula One-bound Alex Zanardi; Team Rahal were also interested in him. Fittipaldi blocked both deals as he felt Mercedes-Benz was CART's best engine. Bettenhausen Racing fired Castroneves in January 1999, and replaced him with the sponsored Shigeaki Hattori. Castroneves agreed with team owner Carl Hogan on 26 January to drive for Hogan Racing in 1999 in place of JJ Lehto on the condition he paid $3 million in sponsorship to the team. He drove the unreliable No. 9 Lola B99/00-Mercedes-Benz car with an engine inconsistent in producing power. Castroneves was ninth in the Firestone Firehawk 500K at Twin Ring Motegi, before coming second in the Motorola 300 at Gateway International Raceway. In the Miller Lite 225 at Milwaukee, Castroneves achieved his first CART pole position. The rest of the season saw him achieve four more top-tens and finished fifteenth in the points standings with 48.

=== 2000–2001 ===
Post-season, Hogan closed his CART team because Fittipaldi was unable to provide him with the requested sponsorship money and consequently, stopped paying Castroneves a salary. Castroneves and his sister negotiated without Fittipaldi's help with Walker Racing to replace the outgoing Gil de Ferran and also Team Rahal without success. Following Greg Moore's death in an accident at the season-ending Marlboro 500 at California Speedway, Penske owner Roger Penske, team president Tim Cindric, attorneys, and sports agent Alan Miller hired Castroneves on a three-year contract for Castroneves after pressure from sponsor Marlboro to find a replacement driver by that date. Castroneves ended his working relationship with Fittipaldi soon after for career mismanagement. (Note: Fittipaldi sued Castroneves for breach of contract, which was decided in favor of the latter on 30 March 2005.)

For the 2000 season, Penske stopped building cars, switched to a Reynard 2KI, changed engine manufacturers from Mercedes-Benz to Honda, and tire supplier from Goodyear to Firestone in a bid to improve performance. Castroneves found the Honda engine's driveability different from Mercedes-Benz's, and was at first, not friends with his teammate de Ferran because they were competitors. He finished second at the Grand Prix of Long Beach, his only points finish in the first six races. He led the final 24 laps of the Grand Prix of Detroit in his first series victory after Juan Pablo Montoya retired with mechanical trouble. Castroneves won the Miller Lite 200 at Mid-Ohio, took five top-tens, and a third victory in the Grand Prix of Monterey at Laguna Seca. He was seventh in the drivers' championship with 129 points, and was named the inaugural winner of the Greg Moore Legacy Award as "the driver who best typifies Moore's outstanding talent on the track as well as displaying a dynamic personality with the fans, media, and the CART community."

In 2001, Castroneves drove the No. 3 Reynard 01I-Honda, and journalist David Phillips considered him a championship contender. Castroneves changed his strategy on a race-by-race basis, getting support from de Ferran and his teammate's pit crew. At the season's second race, the Grand Prix of Long Beach, he led all 82 laps from pole position for his fourth career win. Castroneves started from pole position in the Firestone Firehawk 500 at Motegi, leading more laps than any other driver to finish second, and led every lap of the Grand Prix of Detroit for his second victory of 2001. He achieved a third win at the Miller Lite 200 to go one point behind championship leader Kenny Bräck, and overtook the latter after finishing seventh in the Motorola 220. Castroneves lost the points lead after coming eighteenth in Indy Vancouver, but claimed three top sixes in the final six races to finish fourth in the drivers' standings with 141 points.

== IndyCar Series ==
=== 2001–2004 ===
Castroneves debuted in the Indy Racing League (IRL) in 2001, driving Penske's No. 68 Dallara IR-01-Oldsmobile car, at the season-opening Pennzoil Copper World Indy 200 at Phoenix to understand the series before the Indianapolis 500. Castroneves started seventeenth but retired with engine failure after three-quarters race distance. He qualified eleventh for his first Indianapolis 500 and led the final 52 laps to win the race at his first attempt.

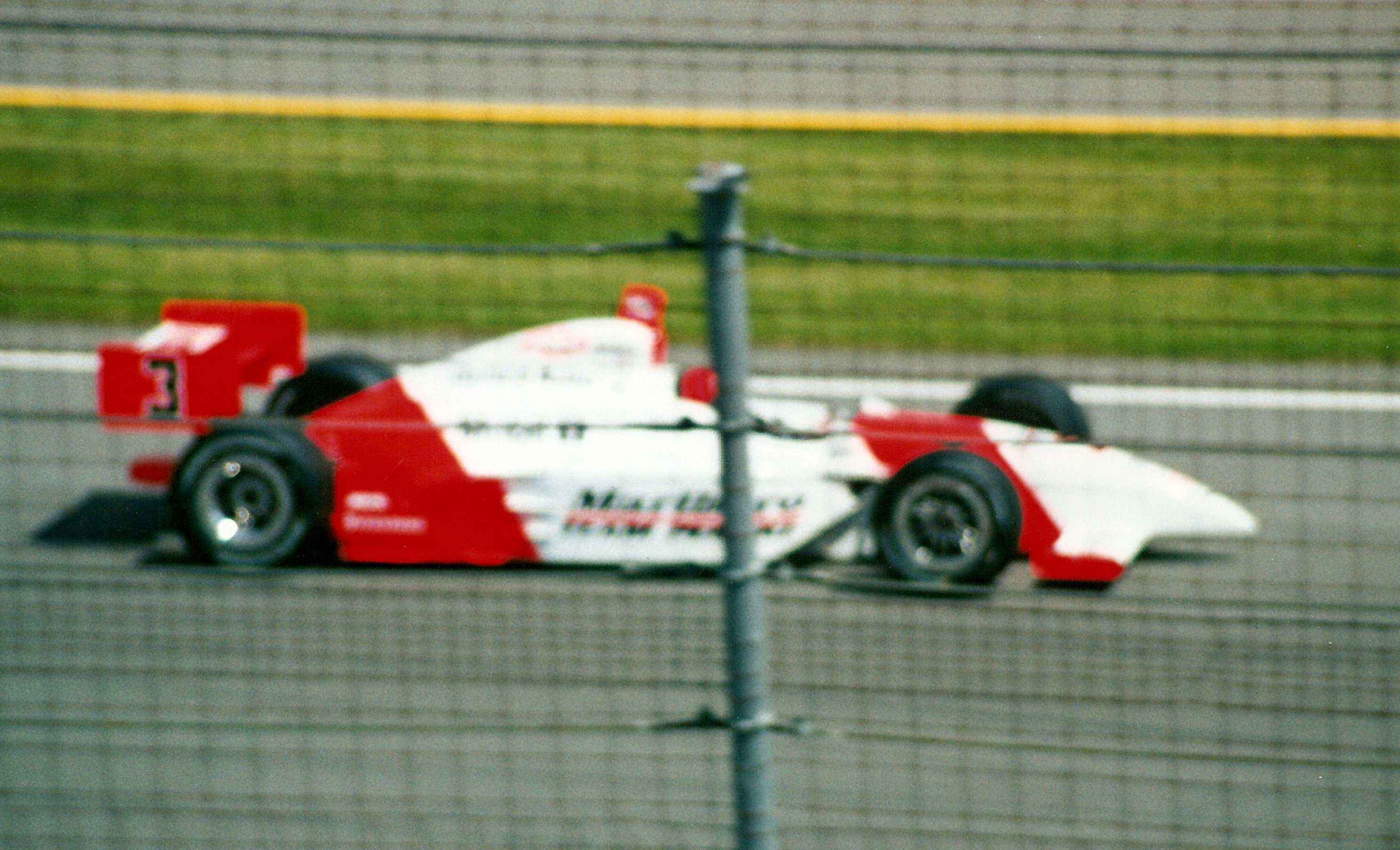
Castroneves en route to winning the 2002 Indianapolis 500, his second of four victories at the race.

Castroneves switched to the IRL from the 2002 season since Marlboro wanted Penske to focus on the American market. Penske changed engine manufacturers from Oldsmobile to Chevrolet for its Dallara IR-02 car. At Phoenix for the season's second race, he won from pole position after passing his teammate de Ferran on the 183rd lap. Castroneves' season highlight was the Indianapolis 500, which he won in controversial circumstances. With one-and-a-half laps remaining, CART driver Paul Tracy overtook Castroneves for the lead, just as the yellow caution flag light came on for a two-car accident between Buddy Lazier and Laurent Redon. IRL officials' rejected an appeal from Tracy's squad Team Green, upholding Castroneves' second successive Indianapolis 500 victory. (Note: Castroneves was the first driver since Al Unser in 1970 and 1971 to win the Indianapolis 500 in consecutive years. He was also the youngest driver to win the race in successive years and the first to win it at his first two attempts.) He finished no lower than ninth in the next nine races, battling his teammate De Ferran and Panther Racing's Sam Hornish Jr. for the championship. Before the final round at Texas Motor Speedway Castroneves was 12 points behind Hornish and needed to win the race and for Hornish to finish third or lower to claim the championship. He finished second, 0.010 seconds behind Hornish, ending the season runner-up with 511 points.

Before the 2003 season, Penske allowed Castroneves to test for the Toyota Formula One team at Circuit Paul Ricard in France before possible contract renewal. He impressed Toyota with his performance but was told CART champion Cristiano da Matta signed as a race driver for 2003. Castroneves told Penske he would stay with the team, citing his fair and loyal treatment towards him. The beginning of the season saw Castroneves earn two top threes in Homestead-Miami, Phoenix, and the Indianapolis 500. Castroneves took two straight second places at Richmond International Raceway and Kansas Speedway and won at Gateway International Raceway and Nazareth Speedway to take the points to lead. A gearbox failure at Chicagoland Speedway leaving him twentieth and a sixth in California meant he entered the season-ending Chevy 500 at Texas as one of five championship contenders and equal on points with CGR's Scott Dixon. A minor collision with Tony Kanaan took Castroneves out of title contention. He was third in points with 484 scored.

For the 2004 season, Hornish joined Castroneves at Penske after De Ferran retired from IndyCar; at first, the two did not speak to each other often because of their differing personalities. He led most of the season-opening Toyota Indy 300 before Hornish passed him on the final lap to win. Castroneves qualified eighth for his fourth Indianapolis 500. A lack of horsepower against the Honda-powered cars caused him to finish the rain-shortened race ninth. Two races later, Castroneves' first pole position of the season came in the SunTrust Indy Challenge at Richmond, where he finished third. He took eight more top tens, four pole positions, and overtook Andretti Green Racing's Dan Wheldon to lead the final 21 laps of the season-ending race at Texas for his only win of 2004. Castroneves' finished fourth in the drivers' championship with 440 points.

=== 2005–2008 ===
Penske's performance in 2004 saw Castroneves being viewed as an outsider for the 2005 title. He began the season with a fifth place in the Toyota Indy 300 and a second at the following XM Satellite Radio 200. Starting the Indianapolis 500 from fifth position, Castroneves finished the race four places lower in ninth. At Richmond for the SunTrust Indy Challenge two races later, he qualified second and led a race-high 112 laps to win. The relationship between Castroneves and his teammate Hornish cooled after failed overtakes causing both drivers to collide. He qualified on the pole position at Pikes Peak International Raceway and Watkins Glen International and took six top-tens in the final ten races, finishing with 440 points for sixth in the drivers' championship.

Before the 2006 season, Penske changed engine manufacturers from the under-powered Toyota to the more powerful Honda in its Dallara IR-05 car after Toyota withdrew from IndyCar. Castroneves started fifth and led 40 laps for his first series road course win in the Grand Prix of St. Petersburg. He took a second successive victory at Motegi, leading 184 laps from pole position to lead Wheldon by 42 championship points entering the Indianapolis 500. After qualifying second, handling difficulties caused him to strike the turn four concrete barrier, leaving him 25th after 109 laps. Castroneves won the Bombardier LearJet 500 after strategic errors by his teammate Hornish and CGR before tire problems at Richmond and a sixth place at Kansas lost him the points lead to Hornish. A victory at Michigan International Speedway gave Castroneves a one-point lead over Hornish going into the final race, the Peak Antifreeze Indy 300 at Chicago. A fourth-place put him third in points with 473.

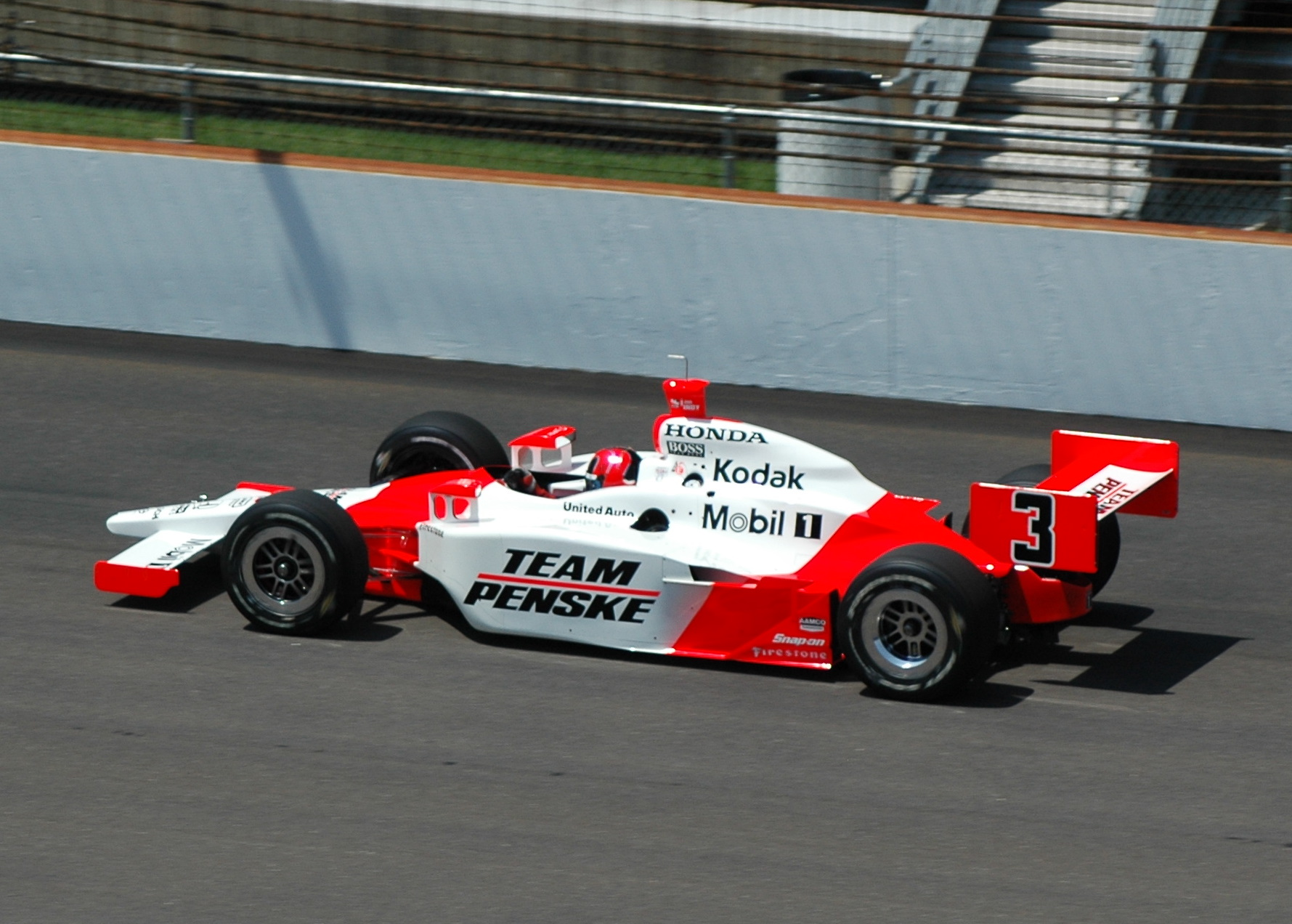
Castroneves practicing for the 2007 Indianapolis 500

For the 2007 season, Castroneves believed the competition would be stronger than in 2006. The relationship between him and Hornish became cordial and the two shared information. He began the year with four top nines, leading 95 laps from pole position to win the Grand Prix of St. Petersburg. He took his third career Indianapolis 500 pole position, finishing the rain-shortened race third after pre-race electrical and fueling problems. At the ABC Supply Company A.J. Foyt 225 at Milwaukee a week later, he took his third pole position of 2007, but a rear wing mounting failure on lap 201 caused him to crash while leading. Castroneves took six top-nines, and three more pole positions in the final ten races for sixth overall in points with 446.

Castroneves began the 2008 season by finishing no lower than fourth in the first four rounds with consecutive second places at St. Petersburg and Motegi to take the early points lead. He qualified fourth for the Indianapolis 500; Castroneves lost the points lead to Dixon when front wing damage relegated him to fourth. He finished second in both Texas and Richmond with consecutive pole positions at Nashville and Mid-Ohio, both of which did not result in a race victory. Castroneves won the Peak Antifreeze Indy Grand Prix at Infineon Raceway leading a race-high 51 laps from pole position to end a 29-race winless streak. After finishing second in Detroit for illegally blocking Justin Wilson, he entered the season-ending Peak Antifreeze Indy 300 30 points behind championship leader Dixon. Castroneves needed to win the race and for Dixon to finish eleventh or lower to become the champion. He began in 28th due to a track limit penalty, beating Dixon by 0.0033 seconds in the second-closest finish in series history, ending the season second in points with 629.

=== Tax evasion trial ===
In late 2008, an Internal Revenue Service (IRS) jury charged Castroneves with conspiracy and six counts of tax evasion for failing to report $5.5 million of income earned from 1999 to 2004. (Note: Taxes of $550,000 from a 1999 to 2001 sponsorship agreement and a $5 million from a "Deferred Royalty Contract" from his 2000 to 2002 Penske contract and under-reporting his income were the specific charges Castroneves faced.) The issue came about when Alan Miller signed Castroneves to his first contract with Penske in early November 1999 following Greg Moore's sudden death at the 1999 Marlboro 500. With heavy pressure from sponsors to fill Moore's vacant seat, the deal had to be completed in a matter of days. Due to time constraints, Miller rushed through the contract negotiations for Penske, simply striking out Moore's name on the contract documents, and hand-writing in Castroneves' name. He also struck out the name of Moore's promotion company (Greg Moore Enterprises, which Moore owned) and wrote in Seven Promotions, erroneously implying and identifying Castroneves as owning that company. Castroneves, who had been investigated by the IRS since 2004 when it issued 150 subpoenas to businesses and individuals who did business with him, pleaded not guilty to the charges on 3 October, and was ordered released on a $10 million bail. The IRS said he owed them $2.3 million in taxes. The trial was held in March 2009 at the U.S. District Court in Miami. A guilty verdict in the trial would have likely sent Castroneves to prison, and ended his driving career.

During the trial, his indictment centered around whether he used Seven Promotions as a tax shelter to avoid paying U.S. taxes. The defense claimed Seven Promotions was a Panamanian company created by Castroneves' father (Helio Sr.) in early 1999 to improve his son's image in Brazil and to recruit sponsors. Prosecutors called that a lie, showing jurors documents they claimed indicated that Castroneves himself owned Seven Promotions, and that it was merely a shell corporation set up to obscure taxable income. An IRS agent testified Castroneves owed every amount of taxable income despite the driver not receiving any of it. (Note: The payments were invested in a deferred compensation agreement with the Dutch firm Fintage Licensing for athletes with relatively short careers and are at risk of injury or worse.) The defense argued Castroneves focused on racing rather than his income; he was unaware of his finances and disliked Dutch and Panamanian business dealings. They said he was uninterested and could not understand his finances and signed papers without knowing their meaning. They also affirmed that the listing of Castroneves as the owner of Seven Promotions in the original Penske contract was a 'clerical error', and that other holes were later discovered in the contract, a result of haphazardly rushing through the negotiations.

The trial ended with closing arguments on 10 April 2009. If found guilty, Castroneves faced a maximum prison sentence of 6 1/2 years with subsequent deportation because he was a non-American citizen, and the loss of his contracts with companies he endorsed and with Team Penske. The jury deliberated until 17 April, when it acquitted Castroneves of the six counts of criminal tax evasion but hung on the conspiracy charge. On 22 May, with Castroneves at Indianapolis and back to driving, prosecutors dropped the remaining criminal conspiracy charge. A few months later, Castroneves and his attorneys hand-delivered a check to the IRS for back taxes owed, seemingly closing the issue once and for all. About two years later, the IRS filed a $6.21 million civil lawsuit against Castroneves for additional taxes and fraud penalties. The suit was settled before going to court for approximately 10 percent of what the IRS claimed.

=== 2009–2013 ===
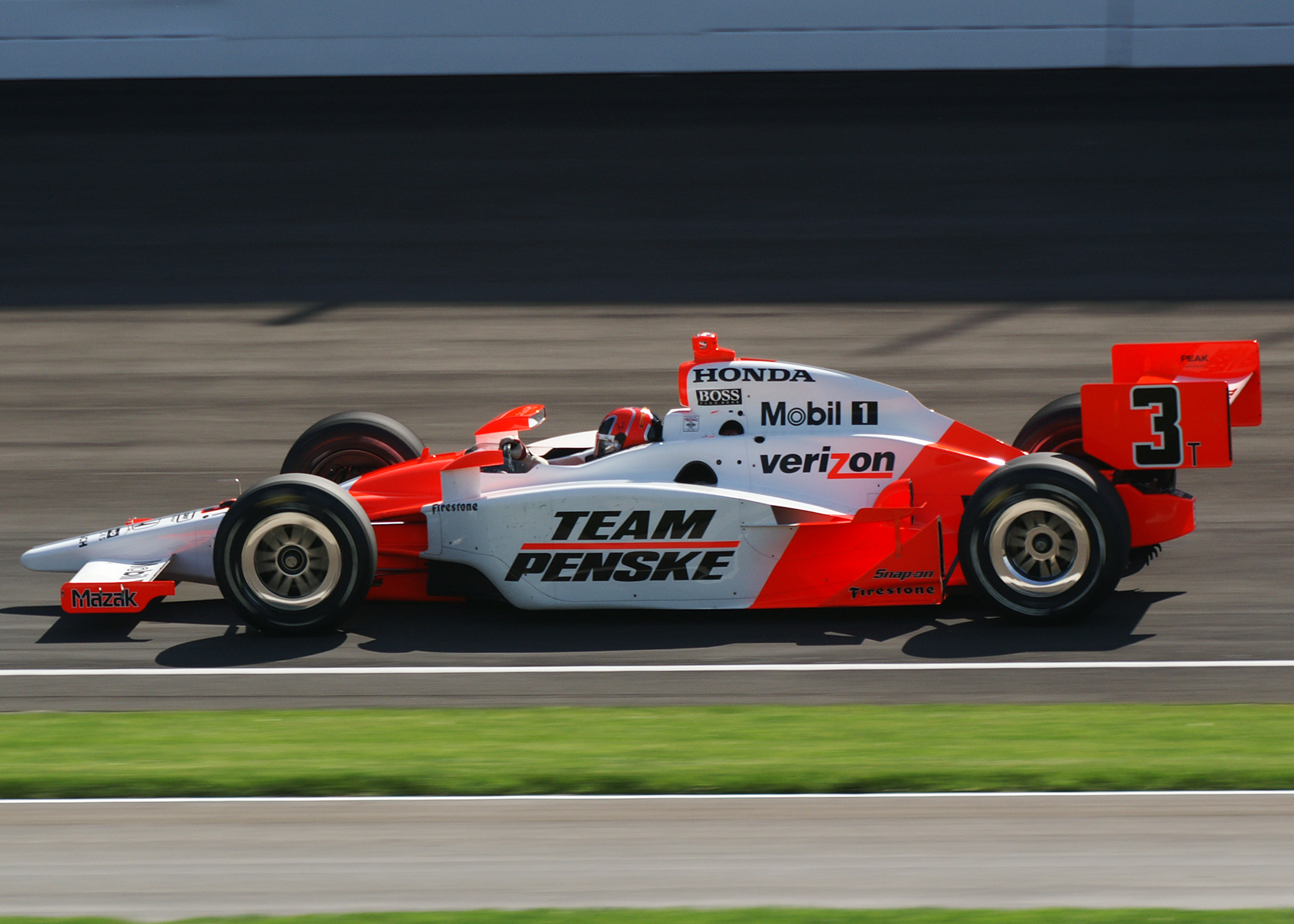
Castroneves driving in the 2009 Indianapolis 500, his third victory at the race.

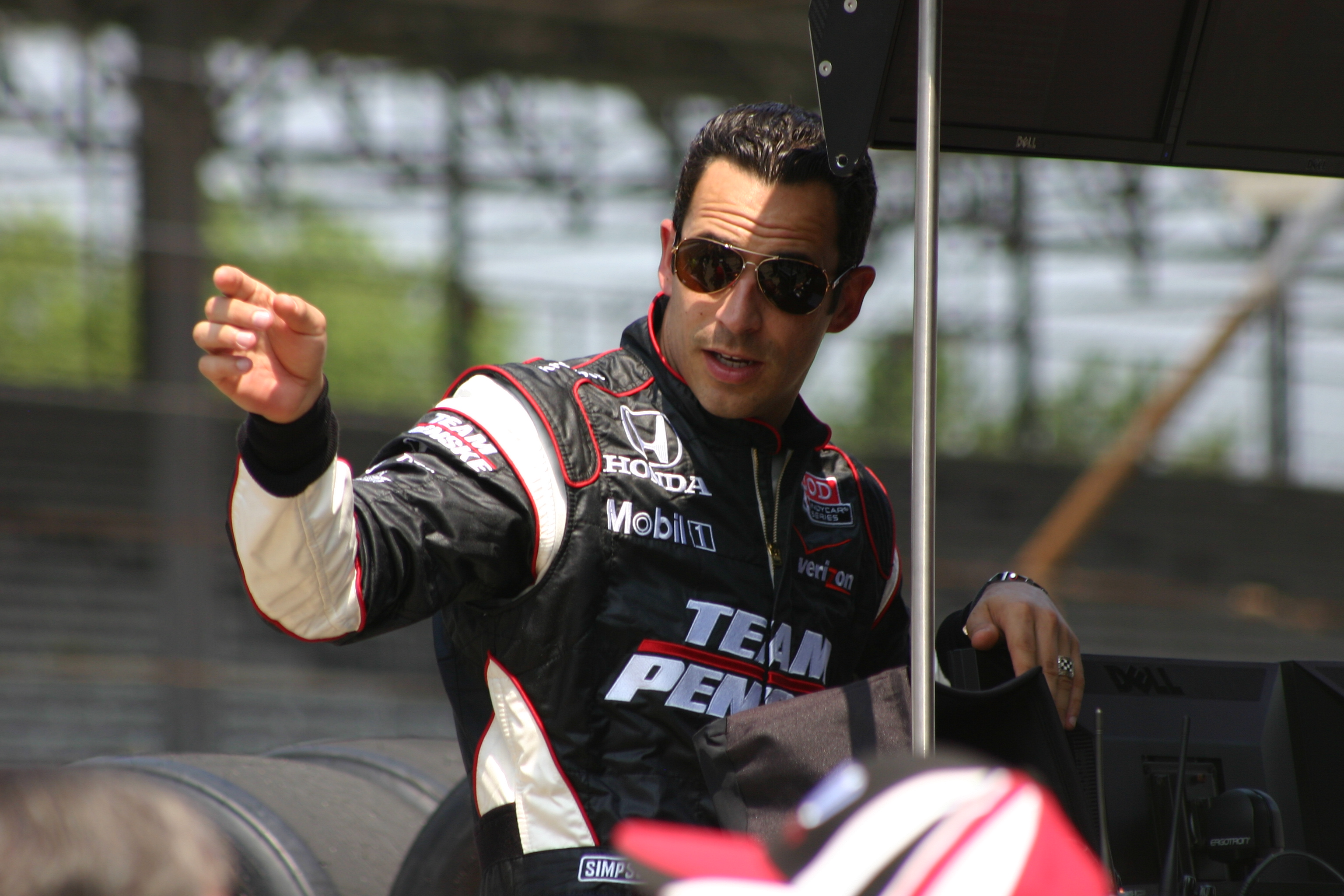
Castroneves at Carb Day prior to the 2010 Indianapolis 500

Castroneves signed a multi-year contract with Penske from the 2009 season; Will Power replaced him for the season-opening St. Petersburg race before Castroneves returned for the Grand Prix of Long Beach. Castroneves' season highlight was the Indianapolis 500, where he qualified fastest, and led twice for a total of 66 laps for his third victory there. In the Bombardier Learjet 550 at Texas two races later, Castroneves achieved his second victory of 2009. He took six more top-tens, including a second place in the Edmonton Indy, and pole position in the Iowa Corn Indy 250 at Iowa Speedway. Castroneves was eliminated from championship contention at Chicago, and finished fourth overall with 433 points.

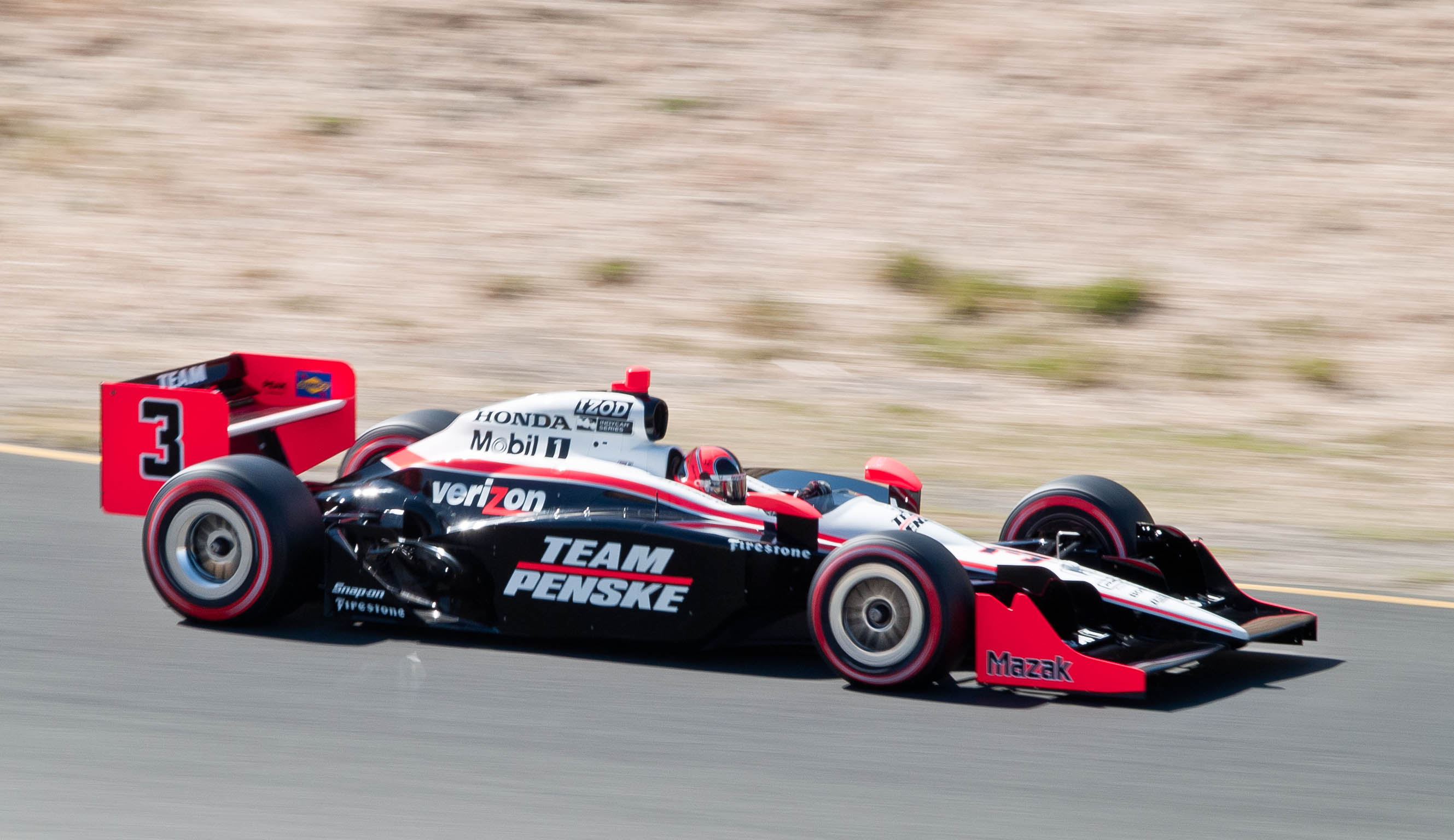
Castroneves qualifying for the 2010 Indy Grand Prix of Sonoma

For the 2010 season, Castroneves felt Penske had reached the potential of its ageing Dallara-Honda car, and feared other teams would exploit this to close the performance gap. He won the inaugural Indy Grand Prix of Alabama to extend his record of winning a race to ten straight seasons. After qualifying on pole position for the Indianapolis 500, a stall in a pit stop relegated him to ninth. Five races later, at the Honda Indy Edmonton, Castroneves was the first to finish, but was demoted to tenth after he was deemed to have blocked his teammate Power. He won two consecutive races, at Kentucky Speedway and Motegi, before ending the season with a fifth at Homestead-Miami. With 531 points, Castroneves was fourth in the drivers' standings.

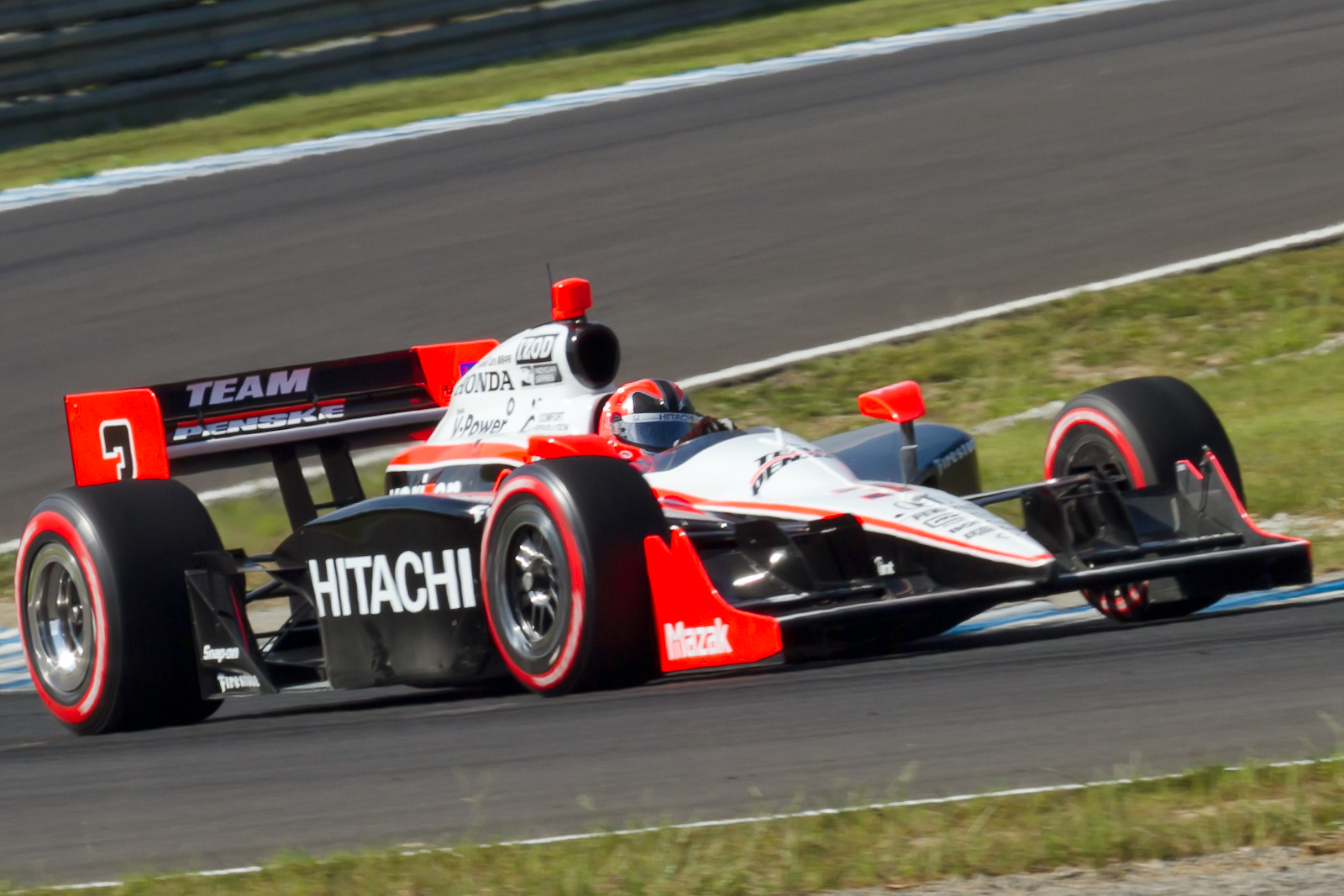
Castroneves driving in the 2011 Indy Japan: The Final

The beginning of the 2011 season saw Castroneves struggle in comparison with his previous years at Penske. He finished poorly as a result of three collisions in the first four races in St. Petersburg, Long Beach and São Paulo; his best result in that period was a seventh at Birmingham, putting him 17th overall by the time of the Indianapolis 500 in May. Castroneves qualified sixteenth for the race; a flat tire and vibration left him one lap down in seventeenth. The rest of Castroneves' season included two-second places at Edmonton and Sonoma, and three top-nines. He was 11th overall with 312 points, his lowest finish since he was sixth in both 2005 and 2007. The 2011 season was the first since 1999 in which Castroneves did not achieve a race win.

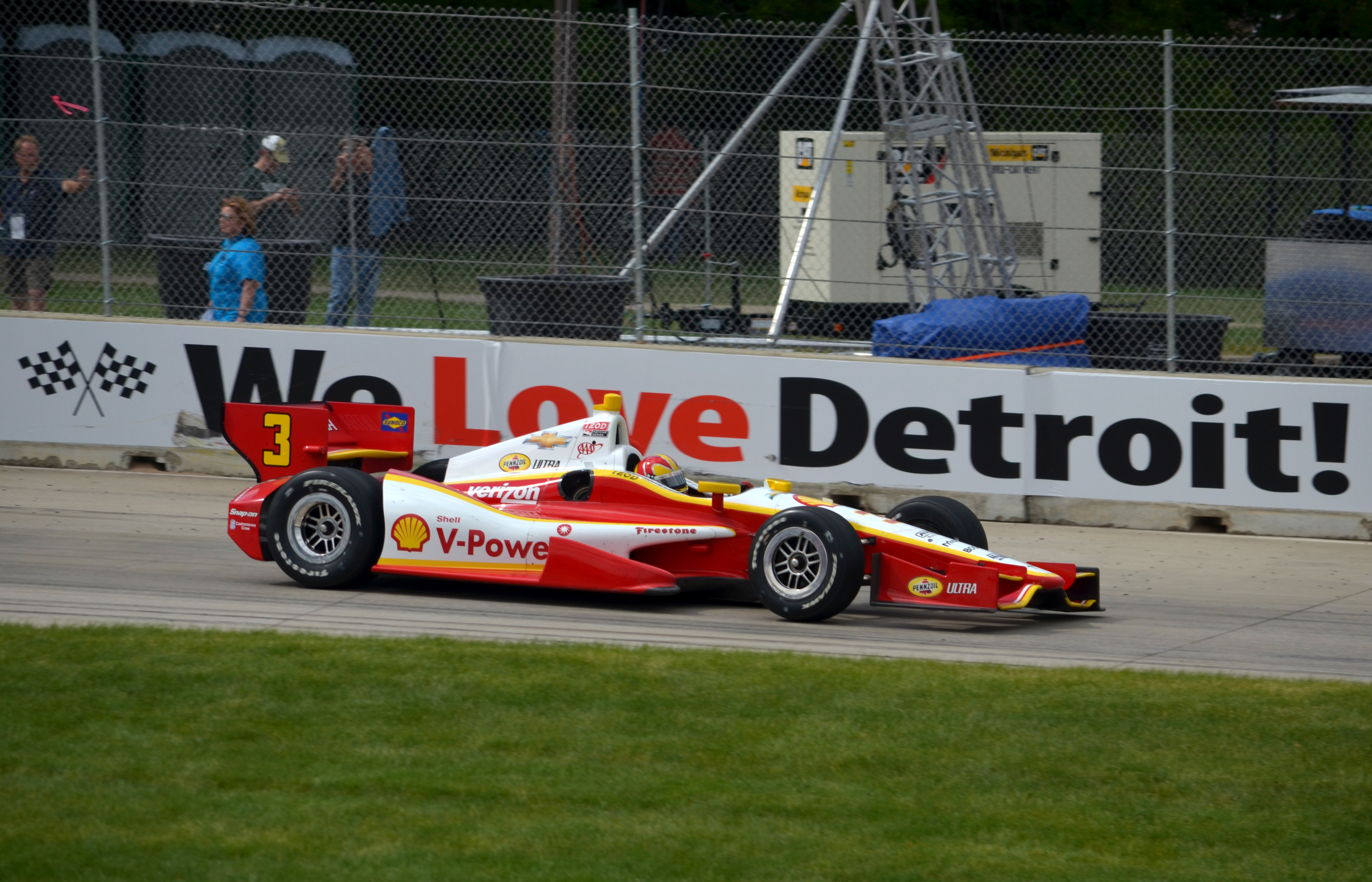
Castroneves competing in the 2012 Chevrolet Detroit Belle Isle Grand Prix

Castroneves signed a contract extension with Penske prior to the 2012 season. At the season-opening Grand Prix of St. Petersburg, Castroneves passed J. R. Hildebrand with 26 laps to go to win. He took pole position for the following Indy Grand Prix of Alabama and finished third. In the Indianapolis 500, Castroneves qualified sixth, but finished tenth due to his car lacking downforce. He then took three sixth places at Milwaukee, Iowa and Toronto. and won the Edmonton Indy to draw within 23 points of championship leader Ryan Hunter-Reay. Castroneves ended the season with three more top-tens for fourth overall with 431 points.

Castroneves re-signed with Penske for the 2013 season; the team modified his car in the off-season. Two podiums in the season-opening Grand Prix of St. Petersburg and the following Honda Indy Grand Prix of Alabama gave him the points lead. Castroneves fell to third after finishing thirteenth in the São Paulo Indy 300, He qualified eighth for the Indianapolis 500; rev limiter issues left him in sixth. In the Firestone 550 at Texas, Castroneves led the final 132 laps to win, breaking a tie with Marco Andretti for the points lead. Castroneves took two more second places at Milwaukee and the second Toronto race and finished no lower than ninth in the next eight races. An opportunity for him to win the championship before the season was over came to nothing when gearbox problems in the Grand Prix of Houston double leader dropped 25 points behind Dixon. To win the championship in the season-ending MAVTV 500 IndyCar World Championships, Castroneves needed to finish nine positions higher than Dixon. A sixth place for Castroneves and a fifth for Dixon gave Castroneves second overall with 550 points.

=== 2014–2017 ===
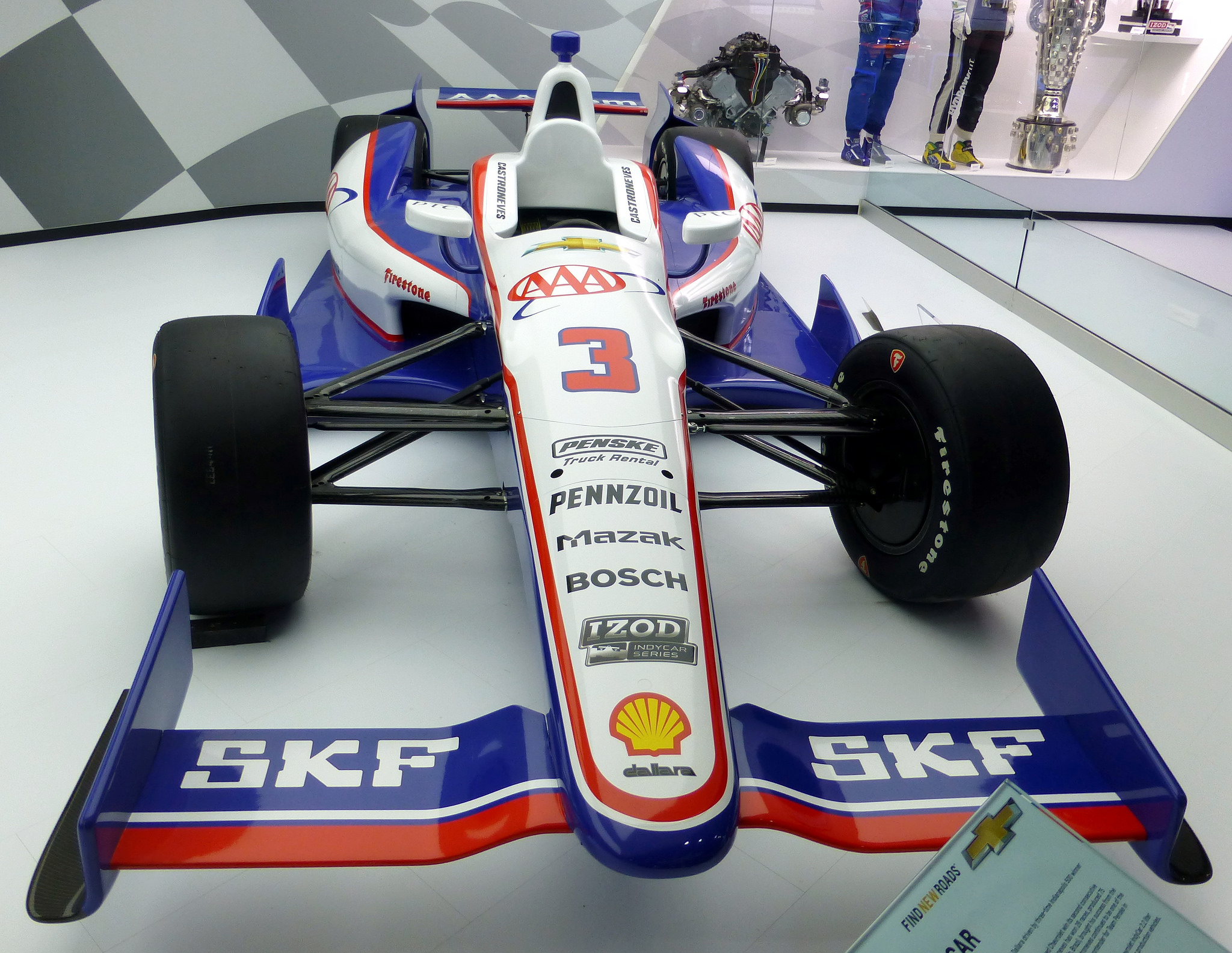
The Dallara DW12 car Castroneves drove in the 2014 season

Castroneves remained with Penske for the 2014 season. Castrovenes finished third at the season-opening Grand Prix of St. Petersburg and the Grand Prix of Indianapolis three races later. He qualified fourth for the Indianapolis 500, and finished second, 0.0600 seconds behind Hunter-Reay in the second-closest finish in event history after a late race duel for the victory. He took pole position for the first Detroit Belle Isle Grand Prix race and won the second. After three straight sub-par results, Castroneves finished second in the Pocono IndyCar 500 at Pocono Raceway to tie his teammate Will Power for the points lead, which took after finishing eighth in the Iowa Corn Indy 300. He relinquished the points lead after a throttle problem left him nineteenth in the Honda Indy 200 at Mid-Ohio. Entering the final race, the MAVTV 500 IndyCar World Championships, Castroneves was 51 points behind Power. After winning the one point for the pole position, he had to claim victory and for Power to finish seventh or lower to become the champion. Castroneves placed 14th for second overall with 609 points.

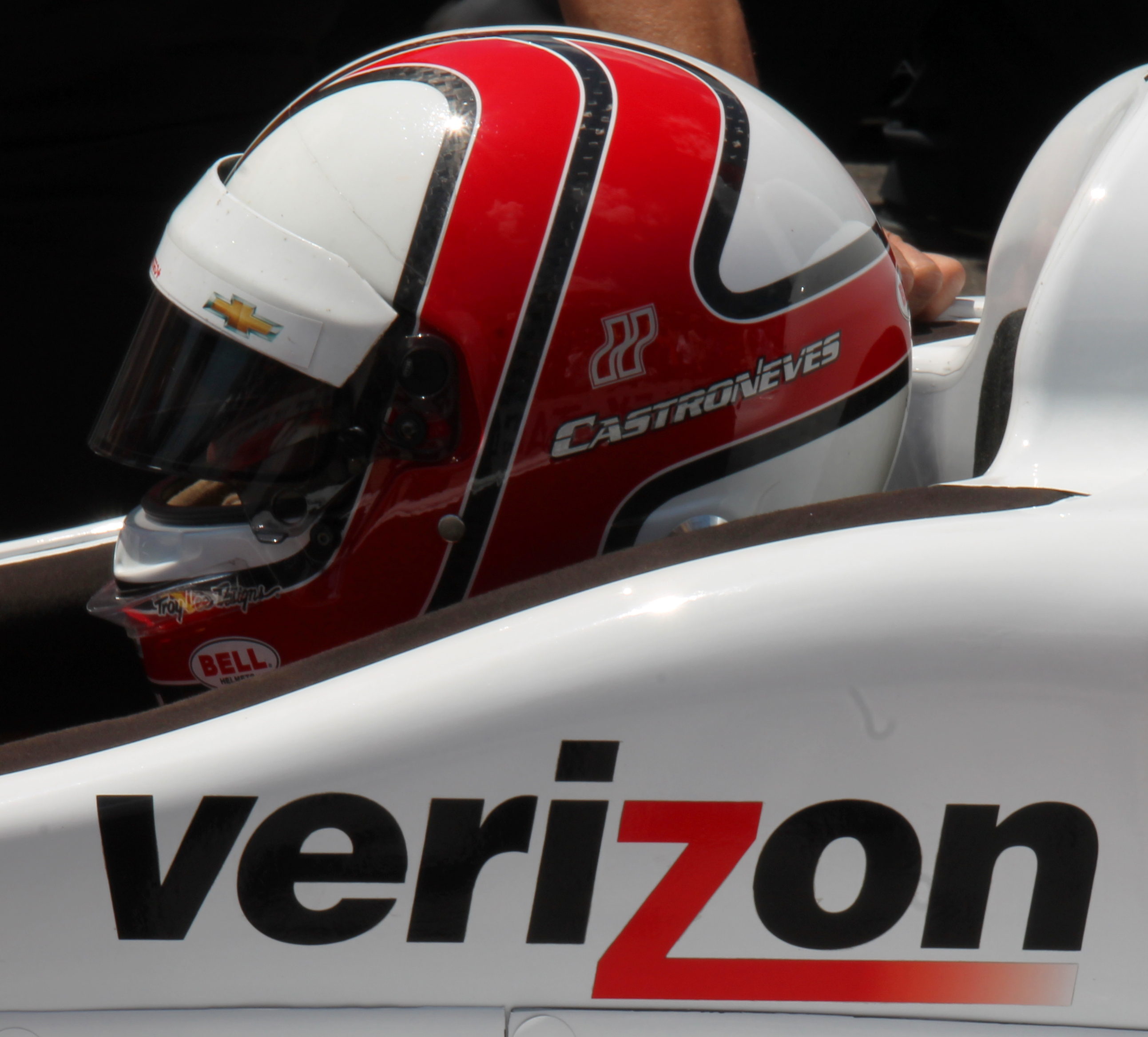
Castroneves sitting in his car on the final day of practice for the 2015 Indianapolis 500

For the 2015 season, Castroneves' Penske car was fitted with Chevrolet's updated aerodynamic package. He achieved consecutive second places in the Indy Grand Prix of Louisiana and the Grand Prix of Long Beach and two pole positions. During practice for the Indianapolis 500, he lost control of his car in the first turn, and struck the barrier, flipping his car over 180 degrees and landing upside down. He started fifth and ran consistently within the top five but finished seventh. The rest of the season saw Castroneves achieve consecutive third places in the Firestone 600 and the Honda Indy Toronto and was second in the ABC Supply Wisconsin 250 along with two more pole positions for fourth overall with 453 points.

Castroneves stayed with Penske for the 2016 season. At the Grand Prix of Long Beach, he led a race-high 47 laps from pole position but a strategy error left him third. Castroneves took another podium finish two races later, a second place at the Grand Prix of Indianapolis. After qualifying ninth for the Indianapolis 500, he led 24 laps, finishing eleventh after a lap-160 collision with Hildebrand dislodged Castroneves' left-rear bumper pod. Castroneves achieved two more podium finishes, a second in the Honda Indy Toronto, and a third in the IndyCar Grand Prix at the Glen. In the ABC Supply 500 at Pocono, the top of his vehicle was mounted by Alexander Rossi's airborne car after Rossi and Charlie Kimball collided in the pit lane. Castroneves was uninjured from the impact. With 504 points, Castroneves was fourth in the drivers' championship.

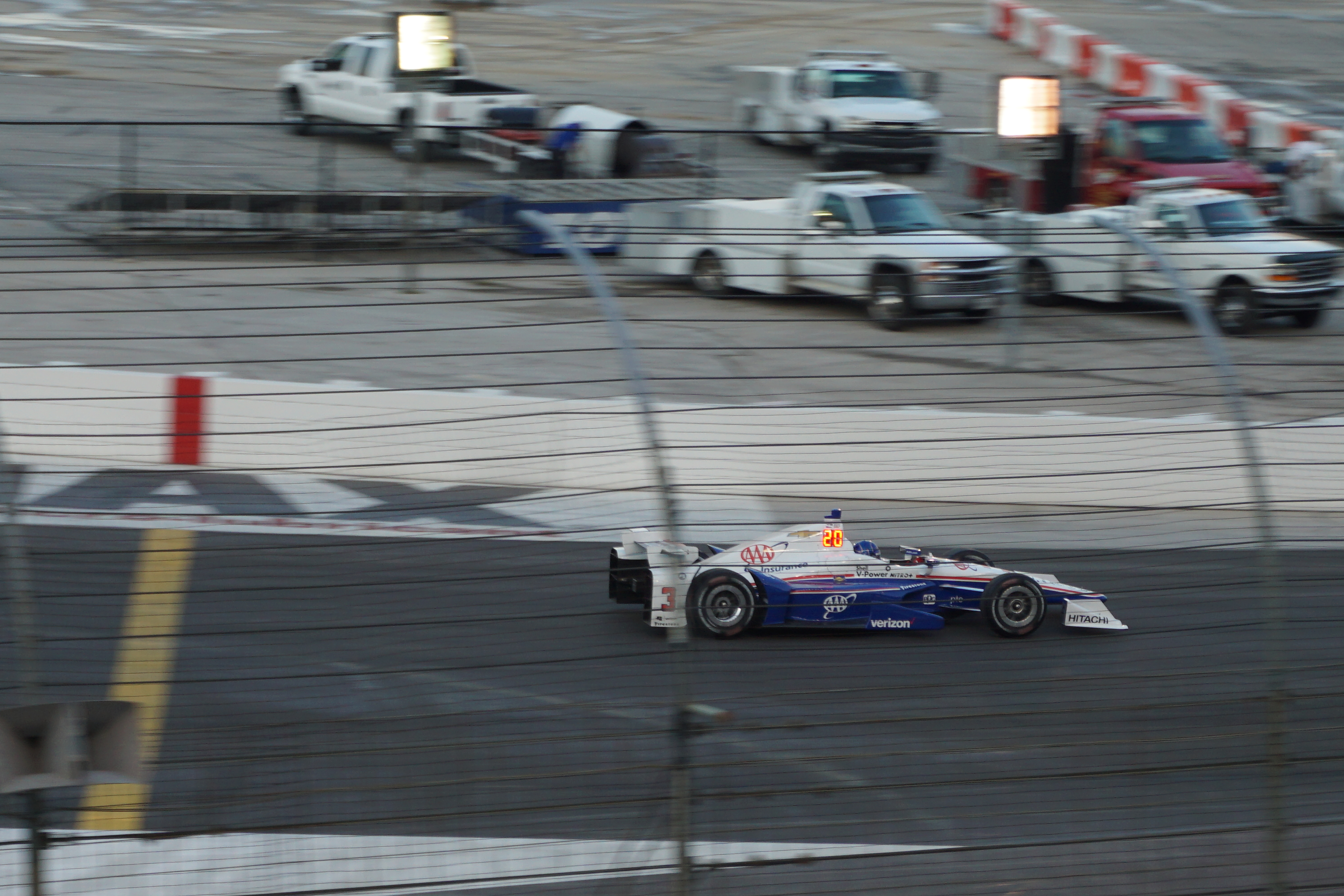
Castroneves driving in the 2017 Rainguard Water Sealers 600

Castroneves remained at Penske for the 2017 season. He began with his third successive pole position at the Grand Prix of Long Beach; electrical problems left him ninth. He led the first 73 laps of the Desert Diamond West Valley Phoenix Grand Prix for fourth after winning pole. Castroneves began from a career-low 19th in the Indianapolis 500, moving through the field to finish second after a late race duel for the win with Takuma Sato. He earned his 50th pole position in the Kohler Grand Prix at Road America, and went on to lead 214 laps in his first victory in 54 races in the Iowa Corn 300. Castroneves finished no lower than eighth in the next five races, and entered the season's final race, the Grand Prix of Sonoma 22 points behind championship leader and teammate Josef Newgarden and nineteen behind Dixon. A victory and Newgarden finishing third or lower and Dixon second or worse would give Castroneves the title. He finished in fifth place to be fourth overall with 598 points.

=== 2018–2026 ===
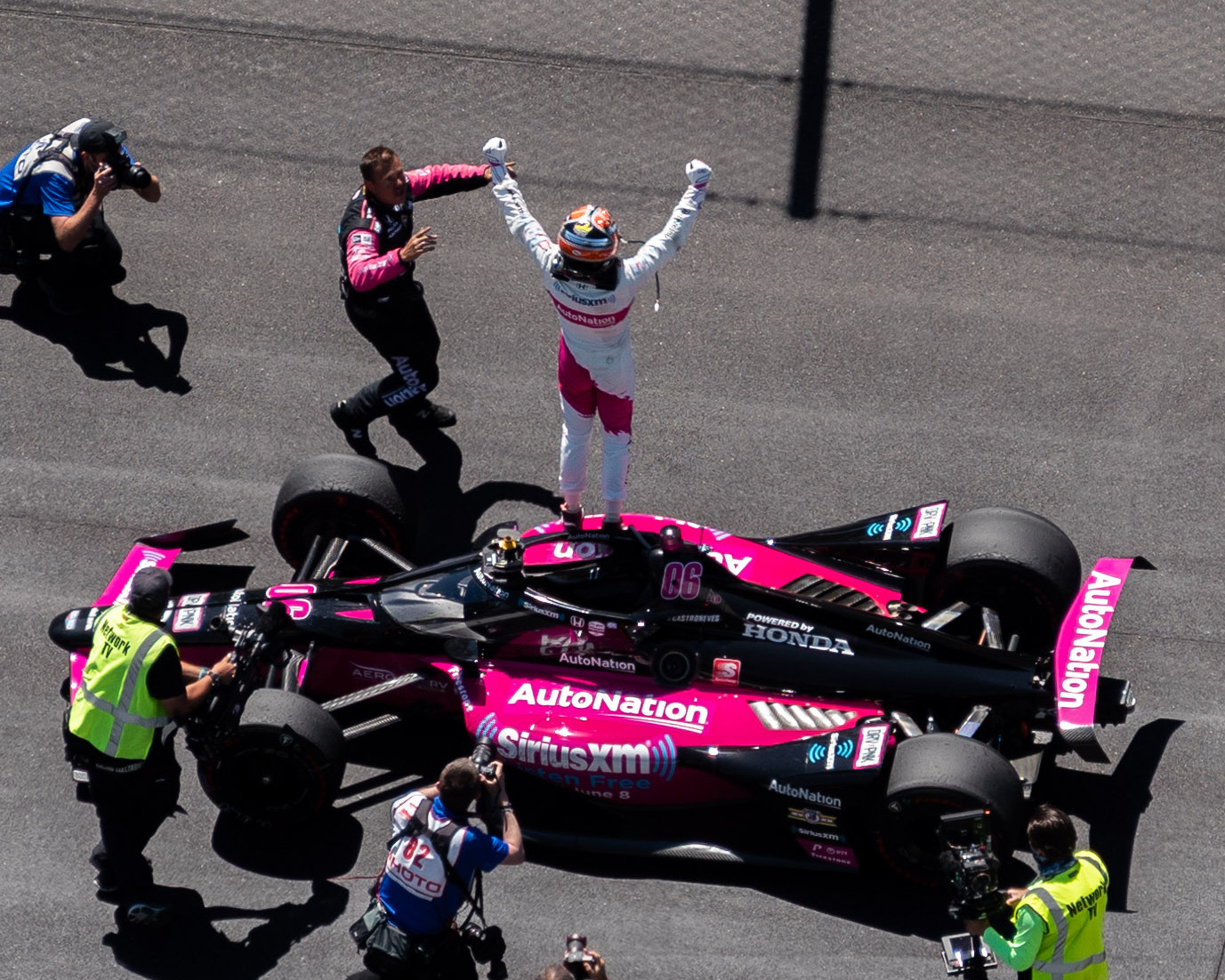
Castroneves celebrating his win at the 2021 Indianapolis 500, his record-tying fourth victory in the race.

Post-season, Castroneves stepped down from IndyCar full-time to move to Penske's IMSA SportsCar Championship program. He was entered into both the IndyCar Grand Prix and the Indianapolis 500 as part of his 2018 campaign; he prepared for the races by sharing notes with his teammates and familiarizing himself with the car. Castroneves' team employed a strategy allowing him to finish sixth in the IndyCar Grand Prix. At the Indianapolis 500, he started from eighth place, before losing control of his car in turn four and crashing on the 146th lap for a 27th-place finish. In the 2019 season, he again entered both the IndyCar Grand Prix and the Indianapolis 500. Castroneves finished the IndyCar Grand Prix two laps behind the leaders in 21st. He started twelfth in the Indianapolis 500, finishing the race eighteenth following a pit lane collision with the rear of James Davison's car earning him a drive-through penalty. He began the 2020 Indianapolis 500 from 27th and finished the race in eleventh.

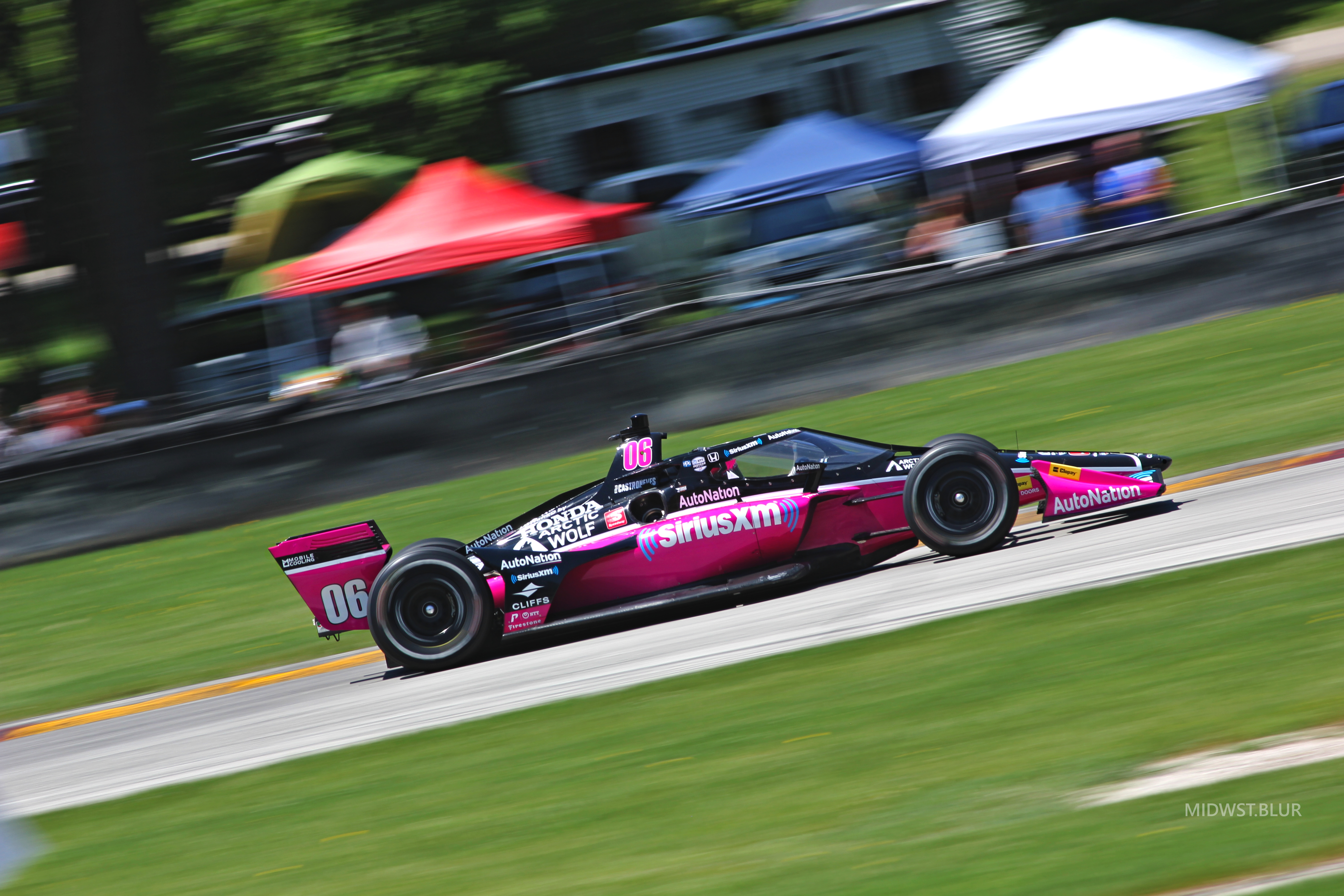
Castroneves during the 2022 Sonsio Grand Prix at Road America

Castroneves signed to race for Arrow McLaren SP in place of the unfit Oliver Askew at the Harvest Grand Prix in his first IndyCar start for a team other than Penske since 1999. He finished twentieth in the first race and 21st in the second. Following an approach by team owner Michael Shank in late 2020, Castroneves signed for the small Meyer Shank Racing (MSR) team to compete at six races in the 2021 season, feeling the growing team would give him the opportunity to win a fourth Indianapolis 500. He had asked MSR to enter him in more races but the request was denied. At the Indianapolis 500, Castroneves achieved his record-tying fourth career victory in the event after a late-race pass on Álex Palou. He struggled with his form after his victory, and he went on to score one more top ten finish at Nashville in his final five races of 2021 to finish 22nd overall with 158 points.

In July 2021, Castroneves signed a contract extension with MSR to drive for the whole of the 2022 season – his first full-time season for five years. Castroneves achieved a season-best result of seventh at the Indianapolis 500 and scored two other top-ten finishes at Long Beach and Mid-Ohio in placing 18th overall with 263 points accumulated, which was his least successful full-time IndyCar season in his career and he did not finish on the podium over a whole year for the first time in his career. In August 2022, he signed a one-year contract extension to remain at MSR for the 2023 championship. During the season, Castroneves finished in the top ten once at Texas, the season's second round, and scored 217 points for eighteenth in the championship standings.

Castroneves stopped full-time IndyCar racing at the start of the 2024 season, having become a minority partner in MSR's ownership group and a driver coach. He was replaced by IMSA driver Tom Blomqvist but was set to continue to compete in just the Indianapolis 500 in MSR's third car. Castroneves qualified and finished the Indianapolis 500 in 20th. He replaced Blomqvist in the No. 66 car for the Chevrolet Detroit Grand Prix and the following XPEL Grand Prix at Road America after Blomqvist under performed relative to teammate Rosenqvist. Castroneves finished 25th in Detroit and nineteenth at Road America. He entered the 2025 Indianapolis 500 and finished the race in thirteenth after qualifying in 22nd. His finishing position was elevated to 10th place following post-race penalties for technical infractions by other competitors. Castroneves again competed in the Indianapolis 500 in 2026, finishing 25th.

== Sports car career ==
Castroneves made his endurance racing debut in the 2006 Mil Milhas Brasil, winning after 374 laps in a shared GTP1-class Aston Martin DBR9 with Nelson Piquet, Nelson Piquet Jr., and Christophe Bouchut. He entered at the 2007 24 Hours of Daytona (part of the Rolex Sports Car Series), sharing Michael Shank Racing's No. 60 Riley Daytona Prototype (DP) car with Hornish, Oswaldo Negri Jr. and Mark Patterson and finishing ninth. Two months later, Castroneves drove the No. 7 Penske Porsche RS Spyder Evo car with Timo Bernhard and Romain Dumas in the Le Mans Prototype 2 (LMP2) category of the 12 Hours of Sebring (part of the American Le Mans Series), finishing third in class and fifth overall. He returned to the Rolex Sports Car Series to share the No. 9 Penske-Taylor Racing Riley DP car with Ryan Briscoe and Kurt Busch in the 2008 24 Hours of Daytona. finishing thirteenth after starting third. For the 2008 Petit Le Mans and the following 2008 Monterey Sports Car Championships Castroneves shared Penske's No. 5 Porsche RS Spyder Evo car with Briscoe, winning the LMP2 category at Petit Le Mans.

In 2016, Roger Penske asked Castroneves if he wanted a full time sports car career. Although Castroneves wanted to remain in IndyCar, he solicited advice from Indianapolis 500 winner Rick Mears because he had doubts about staying at Penske. Mears told Castroneves to remain at Penske because of Roger Penske's personality. Talks with several teams came close to employment but Castroneves decided to remain with Penske out of loyalty. To prepare for the 2018 IMSA SportsCar Championship in an Acura ARX-05 car in the Daytona Prototype International (DPi) category, he drove the final race of the 2017 season, the Petit Le Mans. Teamed with Montoya and Simon Pagenaud, he qualified the No. 6 Oreca 07-Gibson LMP2 car on pole position, finishing the race third after a collision with Matteo Cressoni's Ferrari.

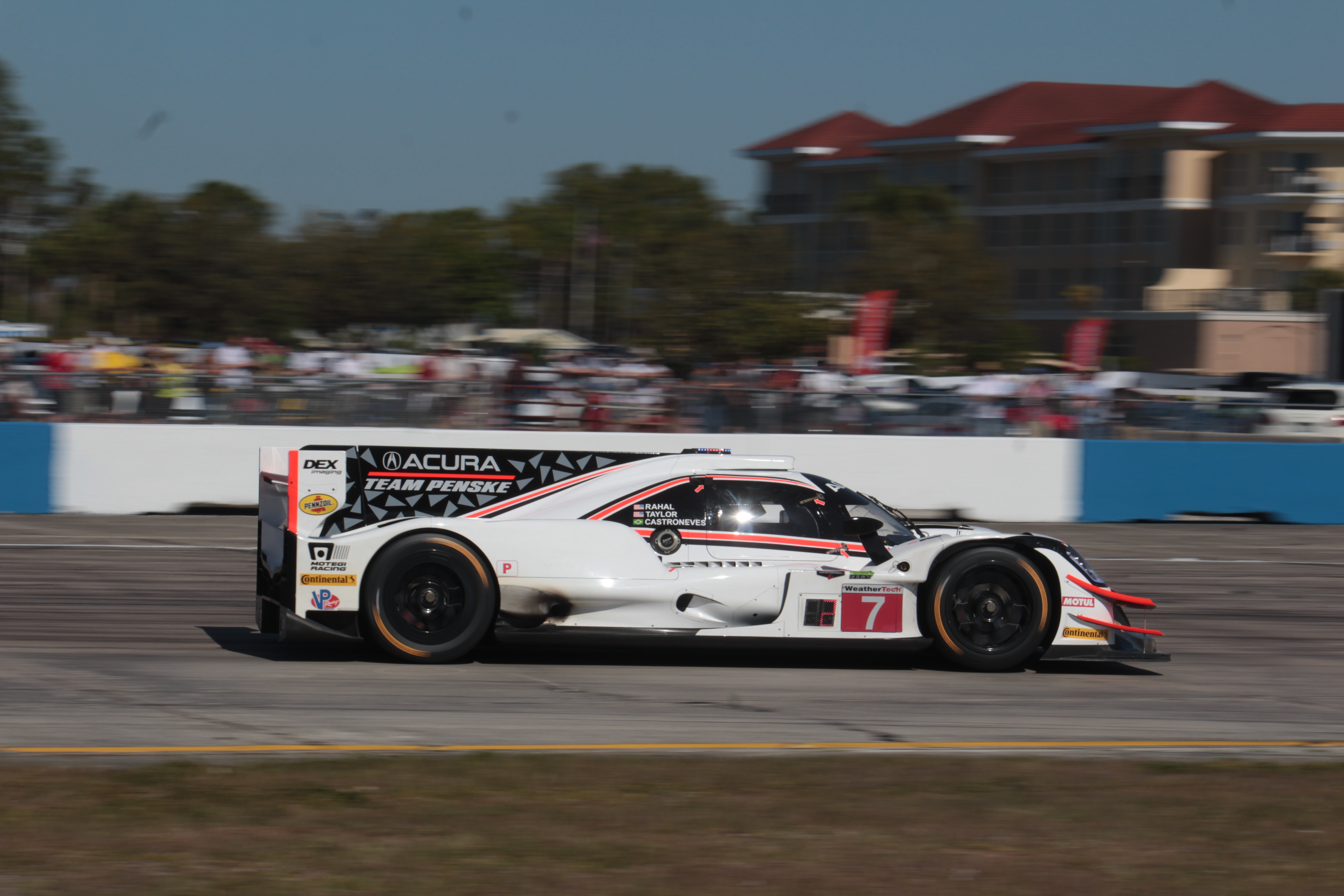
The Acura ARX-05 car of Castroneves, Graham Rahal and Ricky Taylor in the 2018 12 Hours of Sebring.

Castroneves formally joined Penske's 2018 IMSA program in October 2017. He was joined by Ricky Taylor for the entire season, and by Graham Rahal for the 24 Hours of Daytona, the 12 Hours of Sebring and Petit Le Mans. He referenced his teammates Dane Cameron and Montoya, and communicated constantly with his race engineer and Taylor. Their car started second for the Daytona race, and finished ninth, after Castroneves and Action Express Racing's Felipe Nasr collided in the sixteenth hour. After starting third at Sebring, he retired after six hours with a loss of oil pressure. In the Sports Car Challenge of Mid-Ohio at Mid-Ohio he and Taylor led 87 laps from pole for his first series victory. The final six races saw him achieve four top tens and finish second in the Chevrolet Sports Car Classic at Detroit. Castroneves was seventh in the Prototype drivers' standings with 243 points and was third in the North American Endurance Cup.

For the 2019 season, Castroneves remained at Penske in the new DPi class. He again partnered Taylor in the No. 7 car, joined by Rossi at the 24 Hours of Daytona and 12 Hours of Sebring and Rahal in the season-ending Petit Le Mans. Castroneves and his co-drivers finished the rain-shortened Daytona season-opener third from starting second. A fourth place at Sebring and a second in the following BUBBA Burger Sports Car Grand Prix at Long Beach moved him and Taylor to a season-high second in the DPi standings. The rest of the season saw Castroneves and Taylor achieve two third places in the Chevrolet Sports Car Classic and the Petit Le Mans and a second place in the Monterey Grand Prix at Laguna Seca. With 284 points, he finished third in the DPi standings and was joint fifth with Oliver Jarvis and Tristan Nunez of Mazda Team Joest in the North American Endurance Cup.

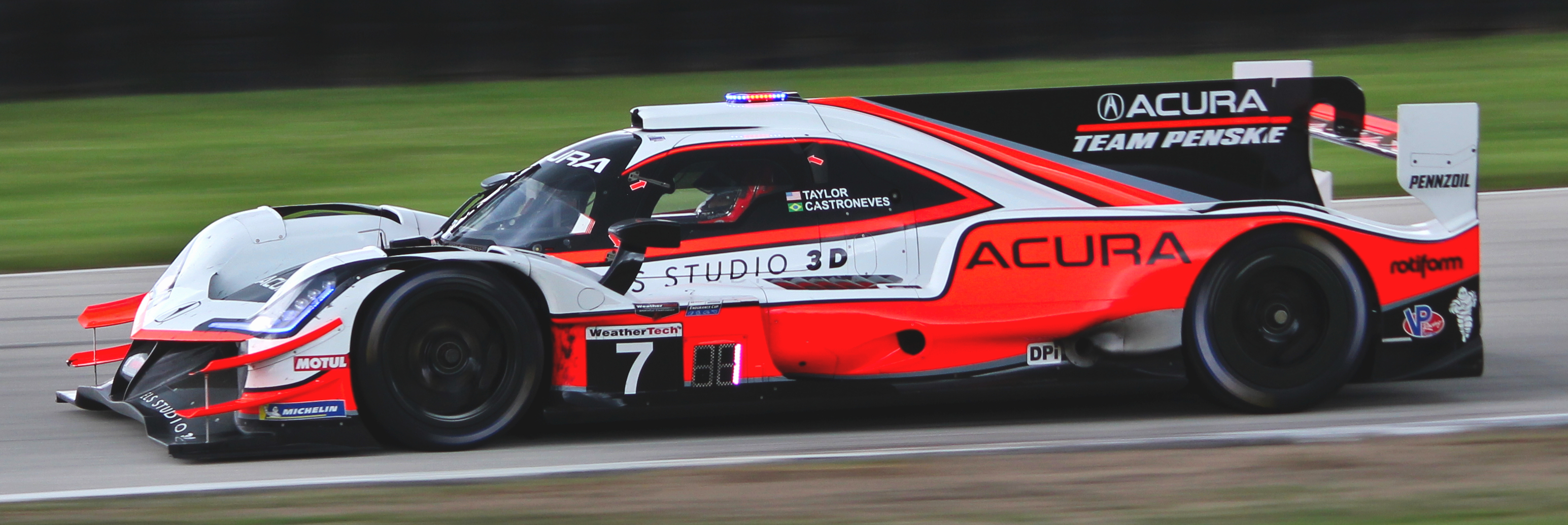
Castroneves competing at the 2020 IMSA SportsCar Weekend, the first of four wins during the 2020 season.

Castroneves remained at Penske's IMSA program in 2020. He was again teamed with Taylor in the No. 7 vehicle, with Rossi joining them for the endurance races. Castroneves' team was comprised in the fourth hour of the season-opening 24 Hours of Daytona following a collision with Harry Tincknell restricting them to finishing 22 laps down in eighth. He won consecutive races in the rain-affected Road Race Showcase at Road America from pole position, the Grand Prix of Road Atlanta, and the Sports Car Challenge at Mid-Ohio. Castroneves and Taylor won the championship at the season-ending 12 Hours of Sebring, his first in auto racing, by one point over Briscoe and Renger van der Zande.

In the 2021 IMSA SportsCar Championship, Castroneves won the 2021 24 Hours of Daytona as an endurance driver, sharing the No. 10 Wayne Taylor Racing Acura ARX-05 car with Filipe Albuquerque, Rossi and Taylor. He replaced Olivier Pla in the No. 60 MSR Acura ARX-05 DPi car he shared with Montoya and Cameron at the season-ending Petit Le Mans. He shared MSR's No. 60 Acura ARX-05 entry for the Endurance Cup races of the 2022 IMSA season alongside full-season racers Tom Blomqvist and Jarvis as he returned to competing in IndyCar full-time. Castroneves fended off Taylor in the final laps of the 2022 24 Hours of Daytona to win the event for the second year in succession. Although he was set to enter both the 12 Hours of Sebring and the IndyCar round at Texas that were held on the same weekend, he later withdrew from the Sebring race due to logistical complications and he was replaced by Stoffel Vandoorne. Castroneves went on to win the season-ending Petit Le Mans alongside Blomqvist and Jarvis.

At the 2023 24 Hours of Daytona, Castroneves achieved his third consecutive victory in the race, sharing the No. 60 MSR Acura ARX-06 LMDh entry with Blomqvist, Colin Braun and Pagenaud as an endurance driver in the GTP category. He then finished sixth at the 12 Hours of Sebring following a left-rear wheel suspension failure. Castroneves, Blomqvist and Braun won the season-ending Petit Le Mans after overcoming a collision with a slower GT car that necessitated a toe-link replacement. MSR left IMSA following the race primarily due to IMSA deciding that the team manipulated tire pressure data at Daytona, so Castroneves did not compete at the 2024 24 Hours of Daytona.

== Other racing ventures ==
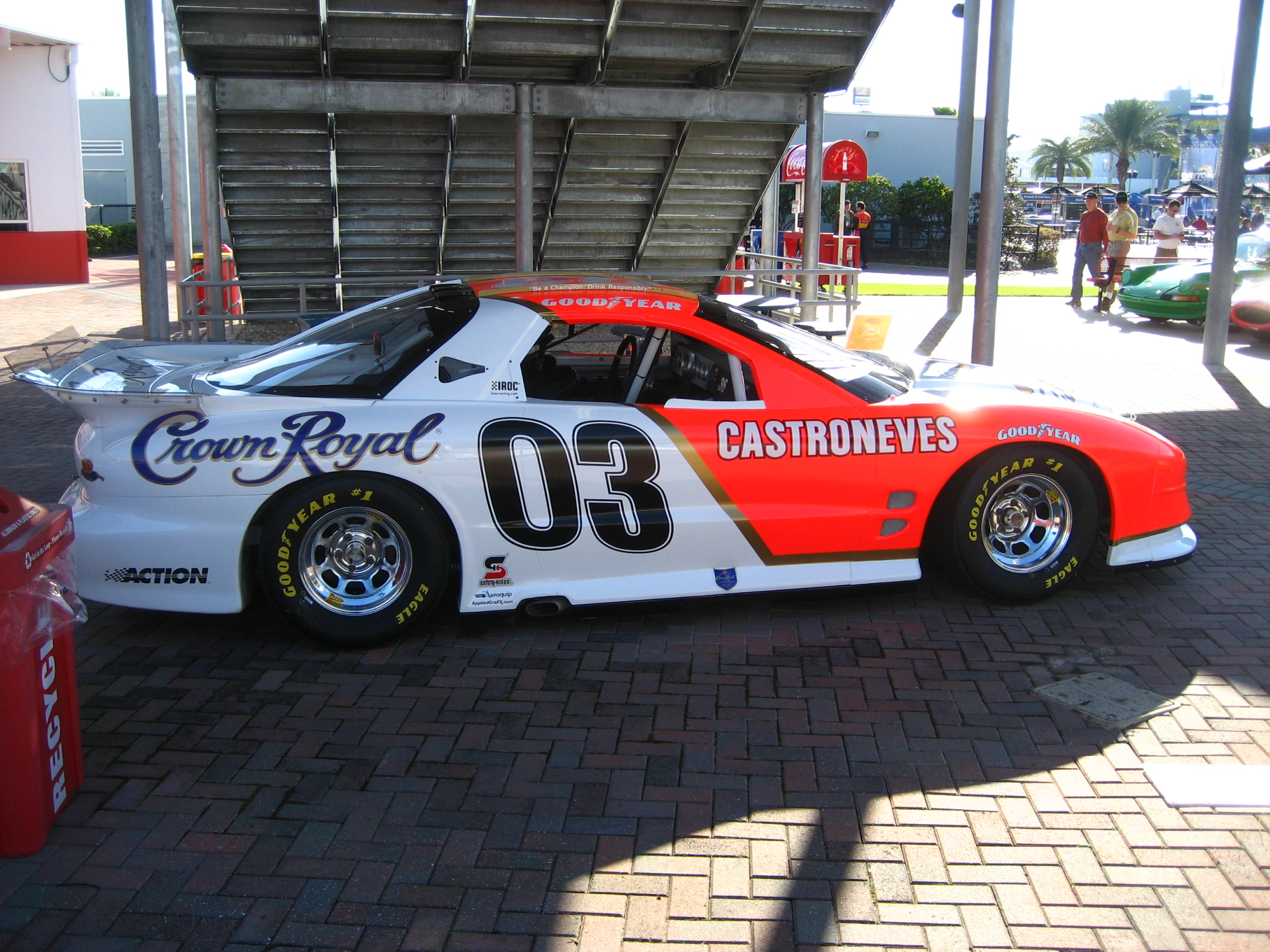
Castroneves' International Race of Champions car

Castroneves was invited to compete in the International Race of Champions in 2002, 2003, 2004, and 2005. Driving a Pontiac Firebird Trans Am, his best in the series was eighth with two podium finishes in 2002. In the 2010 V8 Supercar Championship Series, Castroneves joined James Rosenberg Racing in its No. 47 Ford FG Falcon as Tim Slade's international co-driver for the Gold Coast 600 double header. He visited the team's factory for a seat fitting as preparation. Castroneves and Slade finished outside the top ten in both races. The following year, he again joined Slade at James Rosenberg at the Gold Coast 600 race of the 2011 International V8 Supercars Championship. The duo finished the first race twelfth and tenth in the second.

In late 2012, Castroneves joined Shell Racing in the season-ending Stock Car Brasil race, the Stock Car Corrida do Milhão, after a sponsor invited him to enter with Roger Penske's support. He placed 14th in a Peugeot 408. Castroneves was signed as a guest driver for Shell Racing in the seventh round of the 2013 Stock Car Brasil at Ribeirão Preto Street Circuit; doctors ordered his withdrawal due to sustaining bruised ribs, neck sprain and a deep shin cut in a practice accident.

In the 2017 off-season, Castroneves paired with Gabriel Glusman at the Latin America team in the 2017 Race of Champions Nations Cup, being eliminated at the group stages. He returned with the same team for the 2018 Race of Champions Nations Cup, this time with Montoya, finishing runner-up to Team Germany's Bernhard and René Rast. At the 2019 Race of Champions, Castroneves joined Formula E champion Lucas di Grassi at Team Brazil, being knocked out of the semi-finals of the Nations Cup by Team Germany's Mick Schumacher and Sebastian Vettel. He competed in the Superstar Racing Experience in 2021, finishing fifth in the points standings with six top-ten finishes.

For the 2022 Race of Champions, Castroneves competed in the individual competition and for Team Latin America in the Nations Cup alongside rally driver Benito Guerra Jr. He was eliminated in the first round of both events. Castroneves made his NASCAR Cup Series debut at the 2025 Daytona 500, joining Trackhouse Racing's Project91 programme and driving the team's No. 91 Chevrolet ZL1, finishing 39th after being involved in a seven-car accident. He raced for Pinnacle Racing Group in its No. 82 Chevrolet SS in the season-opening Daytona ARCA 200 race (part of the ARCA Menards Series) as preparation for the Daytona 500. Castroneves finished the race in fifth place.

Castroneves accepted an invitation from Stock Car Pro Series CEO Lincoln Oliveira to drive a Chevrolet Tracker fielded by the RTR Sport Team in the 2025 Stock Car Pro Series. He ended the season 30th in the points standings with 216 points.

== Media appearances ==
Castroneves was encouraged by Apolo Ohno, an Olympic speed skater, to participate on dance program Dancing with the Stars in 2007. He was accepted onto its fifth season by the casting director and producers, who watched a video of him and his teammate's Hornish driving styles in different locations. (Note: Castroneves was certain of an early elimination that he made preparations for a 15-day run.) He was paired with professional dancer Julianne Hough, with whom he built a rapport due to their similar personalities. He prepared by watching episodes of the fourth season and instruction videos. (Note: He prepared for each dance by practicing for up to eight hours per day.) The couple lasted until the finals, which they won with a higher percentage of the public vote than singer Mel B. When he won Dancing with the Stars Castroneves appeared on The Oprah Winfrey Show in February 2008. From 2007 to 2010, he was a correspondent on Dancing with the Stars for Entertainment Tonight.

In 2010, Castroneves collaborated with writer Marissa Matteo on his autobiography, Victory Road: The Ride of My Life. He was inspired to write the book to convey his negative emotions in his tax evasion trial and how he dealt with them. He was selected to be a judge on Miss Universe 2011, a beauty pageant held that September in São Paulo. In 2012 Castroneves appeared on Dancing with the Stars' 15th season and was partnered with Chelsie Hightower. The couple were eliminated in the competition's third week. Castroneves appeared on the 17 December 2012 edition of The Jeff Probst Show, and featured on an episode of Celebrity Wife Swap's third season in 2014. In 2016, he was chosen to take part on American Ninja Warrior, and teamed up with IndyCar drivers Conor Daly, James Hinchcliffe, Tony Kanaan and Will Power on Celebrity Family Feud that same year.

== Public image and other interests ==
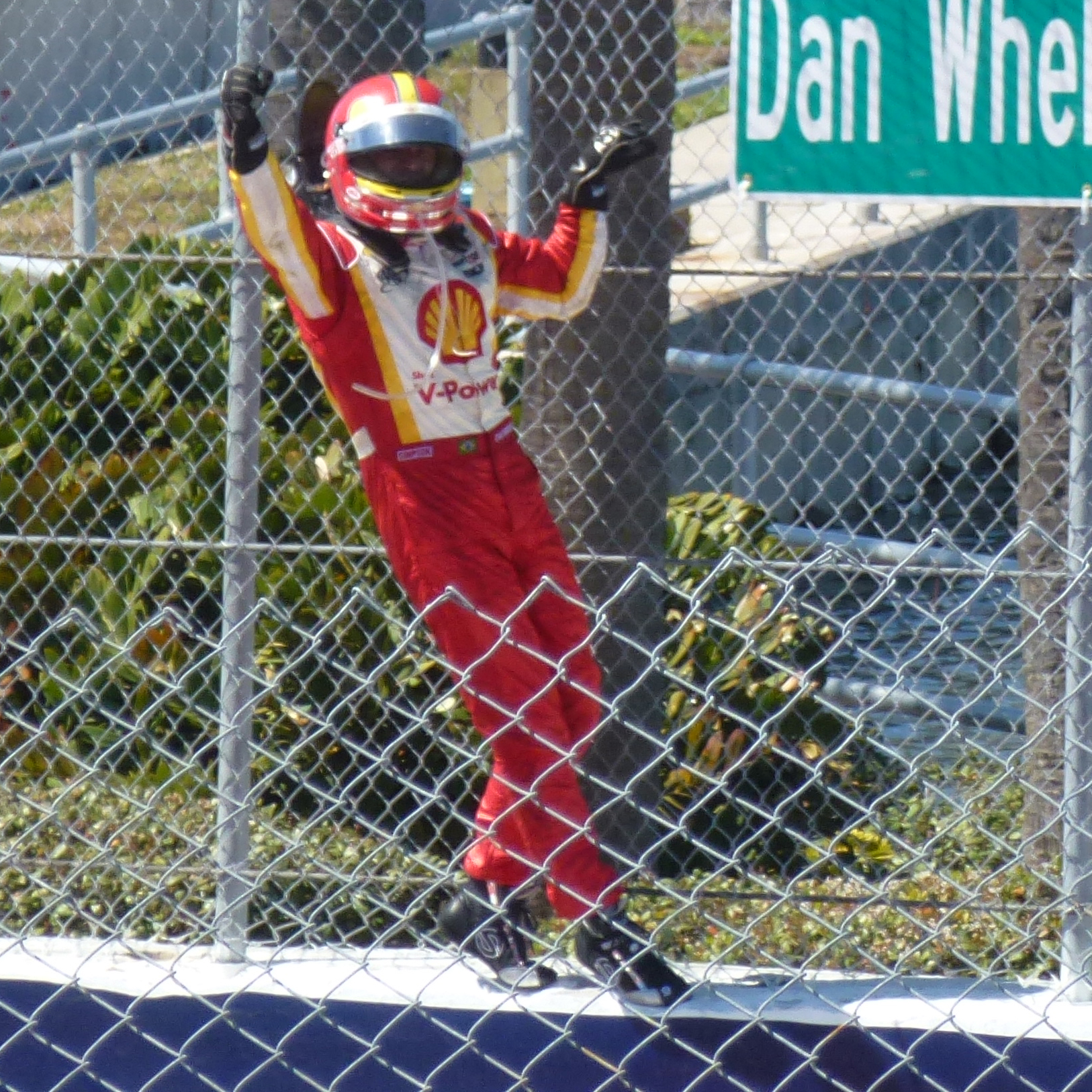
Castroneves climbing the fence to celebrate his win in the 2012 Honda Grand Prix of St. Petersburg

Castroneves is one of IndyCar's most popular drivers; Dave Caldwell of The New York Times noted Castroneves' personality transcends IndyCar through his achievements and media attention outside it. J.J. O'Malley of Auto Racing Digest wrote that Castroneves received some coverage for "his charisma and personality", adding, "The driver seems to permanently wear a smile, and he's not afraid to show his emotions." After 2007, he became more recognized for winning Dancing with the Stars than his sporting achievements. A merchandise sales tallying company attributed Castroneves' popularity outside racing for increasing IndyCar attendances by 68 percent in 2008. (Note: Increased television and press coverage focused on Castroneves during the 2008 pre-season testing period.) Of his IndyCar Series legacy, NBC Sports' Tony DiZinno said, "With four championship runners-up in 2002, 2008, 2013 and 2014, Castroneves is your equivalent Dan Marino, Buffalo Bills or Mark Martin of IndyCar. He'll forever be acknowledged as one of the best, but perhaps known more as the driver who never quite won a title".

After winning a race, Castroneves celebrated by stopping his car, and climbing the catchfence to send a message of delight in achieving success. He began the tradition with his first CART victory in Detroit in 2000 and repeated it each time he won a race. After this celebration, John Kernan, host of RPM 2Night, first gave Castroneves the nickname "Spider-Man", and has been mimicked by other drivers in the following years.

His photogenic looks have been picked up the press, Including People, ESPN The Magazine, and Cosmopolitan. Castroneves has done business with oil companies Pennzoil, Shell, and electronics company SMS Audio.

In December 2004, he had an audience with Pope John Paul II and spoke to a congress on how Catholicism impacted his life and racing career. Castroneves was part of the National Motorsports Coalition that spoke about spectators returning to race tracks and his season to the Congressional Motorsports Caucus in June 2021. He won the 2001 Indianapolis 500 Rookie of the Year and the 2004 Scott Brayton Award for "displaying the character that best exemplifies the racing spirit of the late Scott Brayton."

Castroneves was inducted into the Indy Lights Hall of Fame in 2014 as a 1997 graduate, the Long Beach Motorsports Walk of Fame and the Texas Motorsports Hall of Fame in 2018, the Team Penske Hall of Fame in December 2020, the Motorsports Hall of Fame of America as part of the class of 2022, and the Indianapolis Motor Speedway Hall of Fame as the only member of the class of 2025. He is a São Paulo FC fan.

== Racing record ==
=== Complete British Formula Three Championship results ===
(key) (Races in bold indicate pole position) (small number denotes finishing position)

Year	Team	Chassis	Engine	1	2	3	4	5	6	7	8	9	10	11	12	13	14	15	16	17	18	Pos	Points
1995	Paul Stewart Racing	Dallara F395	Mugen-Honda	SIL; Ret	SIL; DNS	THR; 2	THR; 6	**DON**; 1	SIL; 4	SIL; 6	DON; 4	DON; 4	OUL; 4	BRH; 2	BRH; 4	SNE; 2	PEM; 2	PEM; 6	SIL; 2	SIL; Ret	THR; 6	3rd	169

=== American open–wheel racing results ===
(key) (Races in bold indicate pole position) (small number denotes finishing position)

==== Indy Lights ====
Year	Team	1	2	3	4	5	6	7	8	9	10	11	12	13	Rank	Points
1996	Tasman Motorsports	MIA; DNS	LBH; 4	NAZ; 17	MIS; 5	MIL; 11	DET; 17	POR; 8	CLE; 3	TOR; 23	**TRO**; 1	VAN; 10	LS; 2		**7th**	**84**
1997	Tasman Motorsports	**MIA**; 14	**LBH**; 1	NAZ; 4	**SAV**; 1	STL; 3	MIL; 12	DET; 2	**POR**; 2	TOR; 1	TRO; 20	VAN; 19	LS; 3	FON; 5	**2nd**	**152**

==== CART results ====
(key) (Races in bold indicate pole position) (small number denotes finishing position)

Year	Team	No.	1	2	3	4	5	6	7	8	9	10	11	12	13	14	15	16	17	18	19	20	Rank	Points	Ref
1998	Bettenhausen Racing	16	MIA; 24	MOT; 11	LBH; 9	NAZ; 23	RIO; 23	GAT; 7	MIL; 2	DET; 12	POR; 13	CLE; 27	TOR; 10	MCH; 12	MOH; 17	ROA; 26	VAN; 24	LAG; 23	HOU; 24	SRF; 21	FON; 10		**17th**	**36**	
1999	Hogan Racing	9	MIA; 17	MOT; 9	LBH; 19	NAZ; 21	RIO; 25	GAT; 2	**MIL**; 26	POR; 26	CLE; 26	ROA; 16	TOR; 27	MCH; 25	DET; 7	MOH; 7	CHI; 5	VAN; 8	LAG; 26	HOU; 26	SRF; 21	FON; 20	**15th**	**48**	
2000	Team Penske	3	MIA; 25	LBH; 2	RIO; 24	MOT; 13	NAZ; 16	MIL; 16	DET; 1	**POR**; 7	CLE; 21	**TOR**; 16	MCH; 5*	CHI; 21	MOH; 1*	ROA; 9	VAN; 20	**LAG**; 1*	GAT; 9	HOU; 5	SRF; 6	FON; 9	**7th**	**129**	
2001	Team Penske	3	MTY; 8	**LBH**; 1*	NAZ; 11	**MOT**; 2*	MIL; 26	**DET**; 1*	POR; 17	CLE; 12	TOR; 19	MCH; 8	CHI; 7	MOH; 1*	ROA; 7*	VAN; 18	LAU; 12	ROC; 4	HOU; 5	LAG; 6	SRF; 20	FON; 22	**4th**	**141**	

==== IndyCar Series ====
(key) (Races in bold indicate pole position) (small number denotes finishing position)

Year	Team	No.	Chassis	Engine	1	2	3	4	5	6	7	8	9	10	11	12	13	14	15	16	17	18	19	Rank	Points	Ref
2001	Marlboro Team Penske	68	Dallara	Oldsmobile	PHX; 18	HMS	ATL	INDY; 1	TXS	PPR	RIR	KAN	NSH	KTY	GTW	CHI	TXS							24th	64	
2002	Marlboro Team Penske	3	Dallara	Chevrolet	HMS; 3	**PHX**; 1	FON; 5	NAZ; 5	INDY; 1	TXS; 4	PPR; 2	RIR; 17	KAN; 3	NSH; 9	MIS; 6	KTY; 5	GTW; 2	CHI; 4	TXS; 2					2nd	511	
2003	Marlboro Team Penske	3	Dallara	Toyota	HMS; 3	PHX; 2	MOT; 22	**INDY**; 2	TXS; 7	PPR; 12	RIR; 2	KAN; 2	NSH; 3	MIS; 17	**GTW**; 1	KTY; 5	NAZ; 1	CHI; 20	**FON**; 6	TXS; 13				3rd	484	
2004	Marlboro Team Penske	3	Dallara	Toyota	HMS; 2	PHX; 6	MOT; 3	INDY; 9	TXS; 12	**RIR**; 3	KAN; 7	NSH; 3	MIL; 12	MIS; 10	KTY; 12	PPR; 6	**NAZ**; 5	**CHI**; 10	**FON**; 7	**TXS**; 1				4th	446	
2005	Marlboro Team Penske	3	Dallara	Toyota	HMS; 5	PHX; 2	STP; 20	MOT; 11	INDY; 9	TXS; 5	RIR; 1	KAN; 8	NSH; 5	MIL; 16	MIS; 21	KTY; 5	**PPR**; 4	SNM; 21	CHI; 2	**WGL**; 12	FON; 9			6th	440	
2006	Marlboro Team Penske	3	Dallara	Honda	HMS; 2	STP; 1	**MOT**; 1	INDY; 25	**WGL**; 7	TXS; 1	**RIR**; 10	KAN; 6	NSH; 5	**MIL**; 14	**MIS**; 1	**KTY**; 3	SNM; 5	CHI; 4						3rd	473	
2007	Team Penske	3	Dallara	Honda	HMS; 9	**STP**; 1	**MOT**; 7	KAN; 3	**INDY**; 3	**MIL**; 16	TXS; 16	IOW; 8	RIR; 11	**WGL**; 18	NSH; 6	**MOH**; 3	MIS; 17	KTY; 9	SNM; 2	**DET**; 14	CHI; 4			6th	446	
2008	Team Penske	3	Dallara	Honda	HMS; 4	STP; 2	**MOT**^{1} 2	LBH^{1}	KAN; 4	INDY; 4	MIL; 5	TXS; 2	IOW; 14	RIR; 2	WGL; 16	**NSH**; 3	**MOH**; 2	EDM; 2	KTY; 2	**SNM**; 1	DET; 2	CHI; 1		2nd	629	
2009	Penske Racing	3	Dallara	Honda	STP	LBH; 7	KAN; 2	**INDY**; 1	MIL; 11	TXS; 1	**IOW**; 7	RIR; 17	WGL; 4	TOR; 18	EDM; 2	KTY; 4	MOH; 12	SNM; 18	CHI; 20	MOT; 10	HMS; 5			4th	433	
2010	Team Penske	3	Dallara	Honda	SAO; 9	STP; 4	ALA; 1	LBH; 7	KAN; 4	**INDY**; 9	TXS; 20	IOW; 2	WGL; 9	TOR; 24	EDM; 10	MOH; 3	SNM; 5	CHI; 6	KTY; 1	**MOT**; 1	HMS; 5			4th	531	
2011	Team Penske	3	Dallara	Honda	STP; 20	ALA; 7	LBH; 12	SAO; 21	INDY; 17	TXS; 10	TXS; 4	MIL; 9	IOW; 7	TOR; 17	EDM; 2	MOH; 19	NHM; 17	SNM; 2	BAL; 17	MOT; 22	KTY; 29	LVS^{2} C		11th	312	
2012	Team Penske	3	Dallara DW12	Chevrolet	STP; 1	**ALA**; 3	LBH; 13	SAO; 4	INDY; 10	DET; 17	TXS; 7	MIL; 6	IOW; 6	TOR; 6	EDM; 1	MOH; 16	SNM; 6	BAL; 10	FON; 5					4th	431	
2013	Team Penske	3	Dallara DW12	Chevrolet	STP; 2	ALA; 3	LBH; 10	SAO; 13	INDY; 6	DET; 5	DET; 8	TXS; 1	MIL; 2	**IOW**; 8	POC; 8	TOR; 6	TOR; 2	MOH; 6	SNM; 7	BAL; 9	HOU; 18	**HOU**; 23	FON; 6	2nd	550	
2014	Team Penske	3	Dallara DW12	Chevrolet	STP; 3	LBH; 11	ALA; 19	IMS; 3	INDY; 2	**DET**; 5	DET; 1	TXS; 8	HOU; 9	**HOU**; 21	POC; 2	IOW; 8	TOR; 2	**TOR**; 12	MOH; 19	MIL; 11	SNM; 18	**FON**; 14		2nd	609	
2015	Team Penske	3	Dallara DW12	Chevrolet	STP; 4	NLA; 2	**LBH**; 2	**ALA**; 15	IMS; 6	INDY; 7	DET; 6	DET; 19	TXS; 3	TOR; 3	FON; 23	MIL; 2	**IOW**; 11	MOH; 15	**POC**; 16	SNM; 15				5th	453	
2016	Team Penske	3	Dallara DW12	Chevrolet	STP; 4	**PHX**; 11	**LBH**; 3	ALA; 7	IMS; 2	INDY; 11	DET; 5	DET; 14	ROA; 5	IOW; 13	TOR; 2	MOH; 15	POC; 19	TXS; 5	WGL; 3	SNM; 7				3rd	504	
2017	Team Penske	3	Dallara DW12	Chevrolet	STP; 6	**LBH**; 9	ALA; 4	**PHX**; 4	IMS; 5	INDY; 2	DET; 7	DET; 9	TXS; 20	**ROA**; 3	IOW; 1	TOR; 8	MOH; 7	POC; 7	GTW; 4	WGL; 4	SNM; 5			4th	598	
2018	Team Penske	3	Dallara DW12	Chevrolet	STP	PHX	LBH	ALA	IMS; 6	INDY; 27	DET	DET	TXS	ROA	IOW	TOR	MOH	POC	GTW	POR	SNM			32nd	40	
2019	Team Penske	3	Dallara DW12	Chevrolet	STP	COA	ALA	LBH	IMS; 21	INDY; 18	DET	DET	TXS	ROA	TOR	IOW	MOH	POC	GTW	POR	LAG			29th	33	
2020	Team Penske	3	Dallara DW12	Chevrolet	TXS	IMS	ROA	ROA	IOW	IOW	INDY; 11	GTW	GTW	MOH	MOH									27th	57	
2020	Arrow McLaren SP	7	Dallara DW12	Chevrolet												IMS; 20	IMS; 21	STP						27th	57	
2021	Meyer Shank Racing	06	Dallara DW12	Honda	ALA	STP	TXS	TXS	IMS	INDY; 1	DET	DET	ROA	MOH	NSH; 9	IMS; 21	GTW	POR; 23	LAG; 24	LBH; 20				22nd	158	
2022	Meyer Shank Racing	06	Dallara DW12	Honda	STP; 14	TXS; 23	LBH; 9	ALA; 21	IMS; 14	INDY; 7	DET; 25	ROA; 22	MOH; 8	TOR; 17	IOW; 16	IOW; 21	IMS; 19	NSH; 13	GTW; 15	POR; 17	LAG; 19			18th	263	
2023	Meyer Shank Racing	06	Dallara DW12	Honda	STP; 23	TXS; 10	LBH; 21	ALA; 21	IMS; 22	INDY; 15	DET; 19	ROA; 15	MOH; 21	TOR; 21	IOW; 14	IOW; 16	NSH; 11	IMS; 15	GTW; 23	POR; 14	LAG; 13			18th	217	
2024	Meyer Shank Racing w/ Curb-Agajanian	06	Dallara DW12	Honda	STP	THE	LBH	ALA	IMS	INDY; 20														35th	26	
2024	Meyer Shank Racing	66	Dallara DW12	Honda							DET; 25	ROA; 19	LAG	MOH	IOW	IOW	TOR	GTW	POR	MIL	MIL	NSH		35th	26	
2025	Meyer Shank Racing w/ Curb-Agajanian	06	Dallara DW12	Honda	STP	THE	LBH	ALA	IMS	INDY; 10	DET	GTW	ROA	MOH	IOW	IOW	TOR	LAG	POR	MIL	NSH			29th	20	
2026	Meyer Shank Racing w/ Curb-Agajanian	06	Dallara DW12	Honda	STP	PHX	ARL	ALA	LBH	IMS	INDY; 25	DET	GTW	ROA	MOH	NSH	POR	MRK	WSH	MIL	MIL	LAG		30th	5	

* Season still in progress.

- ^{1} Run on same day
- ^{2} The 2011 IZOD IndyCar World Championship was abandoned after Dan Wheldon died from injuries sustained in a 15-car crash on lap 11.

Years	Teams	Races	Poles	Wins	Top 5s	Top 10s	Indianapolis 500 wins	Championships
21	3	273	48	25	125	236	4 (2001, 2002, 2009, 2021)	0

==== Indianapolis 500 ====
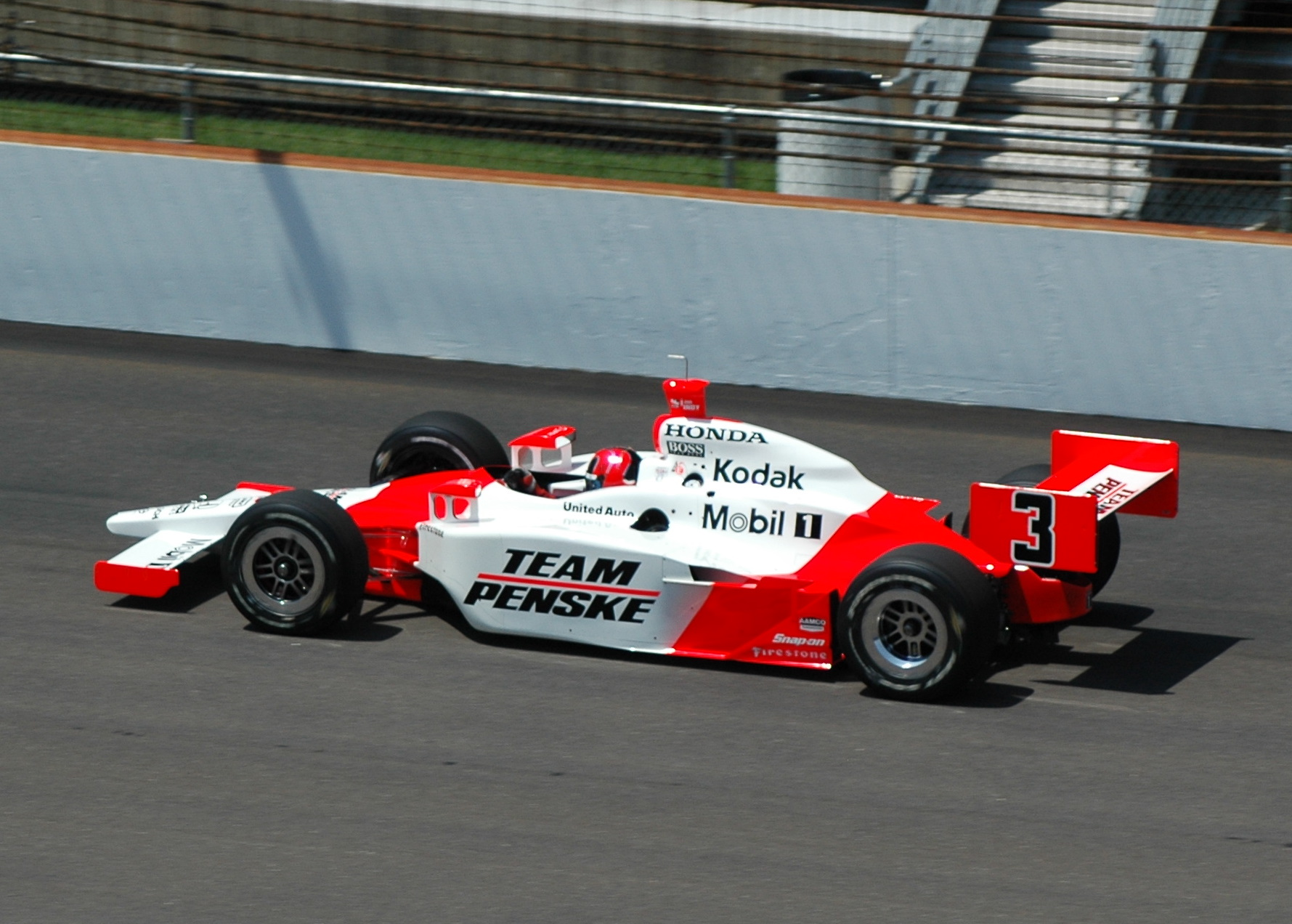
Practicing for the 2007 Indianapolis 500.

Year	Chassis	Engine	Start	Finish	Team
2001	Dallara	Oldsmobile	11	**1**	Team Penske
2002	Dallara	Chevrolet	13	**1**	Team Penske
2003	Dallara	Toyota	**1**	2	Team Penske
2004	Dallara	Toyota	8	9	Team Penske
2005	Dallara	Toyota	5	9	Team Penske
2006	Dallara	Honda	2	25	Team Penske
2007	Dallara	Honda	**1**	3	Team Penske
2008	Dallara	Honda	4	4	Team Penske
2009	Dallara	Honda	**1**	**1**	Team Penske
2010	Dallara	Honda	**1**	9	Team Penske
2011	Dallara	Honda	16	17	Team Penske
2012	Dallara	Chevrolet	6	10	Team Penske
2013	Dallara	Chevrolet	8	6	Team Penske
2014	Dallara	Chevrolet	4	2	Team Penske
2015	Dallara	Chevrolet	5	7	Team Penske
2016	Dallara	Chevrolet	9	11	Team Penske
2017	Dallara	Chevrolet	19	2	Team Penske
2018	Dallara	Chevrolet	8	27	Team Penske
2019	Dallara	Chevrolet	12	18	Team Penske
2020	Dallara	Chevrolet	28	11	Team Penske
2021	Dallara	Honda	8	**1**	Meyer Shank Racing
2022	Dallara	Honda	27	7	Meyer Shank Racing
2023	Dallara	Honda	20	15	Meyer Shank Racing
2024	Dallara	Honda	20	20	Meyer Shank Racing
2025	Dallara	Honda	22	10	Meyer Shank Racing
2026	Dallara	Honda	14	25	Meyer Shank Racing

=== NASCAR ===
(key) (Bold – Pole position awarded by qualifying time. Italics – Pole position earned by points standings or practice time. * – Most laps led.)

==== Cup Series ====
NASCAR Cup Series results
Year	Team	No.	Make	1	2	3	4	5	6	7	8	9	10	11	12	13	14	15	16	17	18	19	20	21	22	23	24	25	26	27	28	29	30	31	32	33	34	35	36	NCS	Pts	Ref
2025	Trackhouse Racing	91	Chevy	DAY; 39	ATL	COA	PHO	LVS	HOM	MAR	DAR	BRI	TAL	TEX	KAN	CLT	NSH	MCH	MXC	POC	ATL	CSC	SON	DOV	IND	IOW	GLN	RCH	DAY	DAR	GTW	BRI	NHA	KAN	ROV	LVS	TAL	MAR	PHO	61st	0^{1}	

===== Daytona 500 =====
Year	Team	Manufacturer	Start	Finish	Ref
2025	Trackhouse Racing	Chevrolet	41	39	

=== ARCA Menards Series ===
ARCA Menards Series results
Year	Team	No.	Make	1	2	3	4	5	6	7	8	9	10	11	12	13	14	15	16	17	18	19	20	AMSC	Pts	Ref
2025	Pinnacle Racing Group	82	Chevy	DAY; 5	PHO	TAL	KAN	CLT	MCH	BLN	ELK	LRP	DOV	IRP	IOW	GLN	ISF	MAD	DSF	BRI	SLM	KAN	TOL	93rd	39	

=== Touring/Sports Cars ===
==== Complete American Le Mans Series results ====
Year	Entrant	Class	Chassis	Engine	1	2	3	4	5	6	7	8	9	10	11	12	Rank	Points
2007	DHL Team Penske Porsche	LMP2	Porsche RS Spyder Evo	Porsche MR6 3.4L V8	SEB; 3	STP	LBH	TXS	UTA	LIM	MOH	ROA	MOS	DET	PET	MON	23rd	19
2008	DHL Team Penske Porsche	LMP2	Porsche RS Spyder Evo	Porsche MR6 3.4L V8	SEB	STP	LBH	UTA	LIM	MOH	ROA	MOS	DET	PET; 1	MON; 4		19th	45

==== V8 Supercar results ====
Year	Team	1	2	3	4	5	6	7	8	9	10	11	12	13	14	15	16	17	18	19	20	21	22	23	24	25	26	27	28	Pos	Points
2010	James Rosenberg Racing	YMC; R1	YMC; R2	BHR; R3	BHR; R4	ADE; R5	ADE; R6	HAM; R7	HAM; R8	QLD; R9	QLD; R10	WIN; R11	WIN; R12	HDV; R13	HDV; R14	TOW; R15	TOW; R16	PHI; R17	BAT; R18	SUR; R19; 18	SUR; R20; 19	SYM; R21	SYM; R22	SAN; R23	SAN; R24	SYD; R25	SYD; R26			NC	0 +
2011	James Rosenberg Racing	YMC; R1	YMC; R2	ADE; R3	ADE; R4	HAM; R5	HAM; R6	PER; R7	PER; R8	PER; R9	WIN; R10	WIN; R11	HDV; R12	HDV; R13	TOW; R14	TOW; R15	QLD; R16	QLD; R17	QLD; R18	PHI; R19	BAT; R20	SUR; R21; 12	SUR; R22; 10	SYM; R23	SYM; R24	SAN; R25	SAN; R26	SYD; R27	SYD; R28	63rd	147

+ Not Eligible for points

==== Complete Stock Car Pro Series results ====
Year	Team	Chassis	1	2	3	4	5	6	7	8	9	10	11	12	13	14	15	16	17	18	19	20	21	22	23	Rank	Points
2012	Shell Racing	Peugeot 408	INT	CTB	VEL	RBP	LON	RIO	SAL	CAS	TAR	CTB	BSB	INT; 14												NC†	0†
2013	Shell Racing	Peugeot 408	INT	CUR	TAR	SAL	BRA	CAS	RBP; WD	BRA	VEL	CUR	GOI	INT												NC†	0†
2025	AMattheis Motorsport	Chevrolet Tracker	INT; 1; 15	CAS; 1	CAS; 2	VEL; 1; 17	VEL; 2; 23	VCA; 1; 25	VCA; 2 Ret	CRS; 1 Ret	CRS; 2; 19	CAS; 1; 27	CAS; 2; 22	VCA; 1; 14	VCA; 2; 13	VCA; 1; 7	VCA; 2; 20	MOU; 1; 18	MOU; 2; 18	CUI; 1; 30	CUI; 2; 16	BRA; 1 DSQ	BRA; 2 Ret	INT; 1 Ret	INT; 2 Ret	30th	216
2026	Mercado Livre Racing	Toyota Corolla Cross	CRS; 1; 21	CRS; 2; 24	CAS; 1; 26	CAS; 2; 19	INT; 1; 15	INT; 2; 22	GOI; 1	GOI; 2	CUI; 1; 21	CUI; 2; 10	VCA; 1; 19	VCA; 2 Ret	SCZ; 1; 24	SCZ; 2; 18	CRS; 1; 22	CRS; 2; 22	BRA; 1; 11	CAS; 1; 25	CAS; 2; 20	VEL; 1	INT; 1	INT; 2		27th*	230*

^{†} Ineligible for championship points.

=== IMSA SportsCar Championship ===
Year	Entrant	No.	Class	Chassis	Engine	1	2	3	4	5	6	7	8	9	10	Rank	Points
2017	Acura Team Penske	6	P	Oreca 07	Gibson GK428 4.2 L V8	DAY	SEB	LBH	COA	DET	WGL	MOS	ELK	LGA	PET; 3	30th	30
2018	Acura Team Penske	7	P	Acura ARX-05	Acura AR35TT 3.5 L Turbo V6	DAY; 9	SEB; 15	LBH; 6	**MOH**; 1	DET; 2	WGL; 12	MOS; 5	ELK; 10	LGA; 10	PET; 5	7th	243
2019	Acura Team Penske	7	DPi	Acura ARX-05	Acura AR35TT 3.5 L Turbo V6	DAY; 3	SEB; 4	**LBH**; 2	MOH; 5	DET; 3	WGL; 5	MOS; 5	ELK; 7	**LGA**; 2	PET; 3	3rd	284
2020	Acura Team Penske	7	DPi	Acura ARX-05	Acura AR35TT 3.5 L Turbo V6	DAY; 8	**DAY**; 8	SEB; 7	**ELK**; 1	**ATL**; 1	MOH; 1	PET; 2	LGA; 1	**SEB**; 8		1st	265
2021	Konica Minolta Acura	10	DPi	Acura ARX-05	Acura AR35TT 3.5 L Turbo V6	DAY; 1	SEB	MOH	DET	WGL	WGL	ELK	LGA	LBH		16th	654
2021	Meyer Shank Racing with Curb-Agajanian	60	DPi	Acura ARX-05	Acura AR35TT 3.5 L Turbo V6										PET; 6	16th	654
2022	Meyer Shank Racing with Curb-Agajanian	60	DPi	Acura ARX-05	Acura AR35TT 3.5 L Turbo V6	DAY; 1	SEB	LBH	LGA	MOH	DET	WGL	MOS	ELK	**PET**; 1	13th	763
2023	Meyer Shank Racing with Curb-Agajanian	60	GTP	Acura ARX-06	Acura AR24e 2.4 L V6	DAY; 1	SEB; 6	LBH	LGA	WGL	MOS	ELK	IMS	PET; 1		14th	839

=== Complete 24 Hours of Daytona results ===
Year	Team	Co-Drivers	Car	Class	Laps	Pos.	Class Pos.
2007	(United States) Michael Shank Racing	(United States) Sam Hornish Jr. (Brazil) Oswaldo Negri Jr. (United States) Mark Patterson	Riley Mk XI–Lexus	DP	628	9th	9th
2008	(United States) Penske–Taylor Racing	(Australia) Ryan Briscoe (United States) Kurt Busch	Riley Mk XI–Pontiac	DP	689	**3rd**	**3rd**
2018	(United States) Acura Team Penske	(United States) Graham Rahal (United States) Ricky Taylor	Acura ARX-05	P	793	9th	9th
2019	(United States) Acura Team Penske	(United States) Alexander Rossi (United States) Ricky Taylor	Acura ARX-05	DPi	593	**3rd**	**3rd**
2020	(United States) Acura Team Penske	(United States) Alexander Rossi (United States) Ricky Taylor	Acura ARX-05	DPi	811	8th	8th
2021	(United States) Konica Minolta Acura ARX-05	(Portugal) Filipe Albuquerque (United States) Alexander Rossi (United States) Ricky Taylor	Acura ARX-05	DPi	807	**1st**	**1st**
2022	(United States) Meyer Shank Racing with Curb-Agajanian	(United Kingdom) Oliver Jarvis (United Kingdom) Tom Blomqvist (France) Simon Pagenaud	Acura ARX-05	DPi	761	**1st**	**1st**
2023	(United States) Meyer Shank Racing with Curb-Agajanian	(United States) Colin Braun (United Kingdom) Tom Blomqvist (France) Simon Pagenaud	Acura ARX-06	GTP	783	**1st**	**1st**

=== International Race of Champions ===
(key) (Bold – Pole position. * – Most laps led.)

International Race of Champions results
Year	Make	1	2	3	4	Pos.	Points	Ref
2002	Pontiac	DAY; 11	CAL; 7	CHI; 3	IND; 2	4th	43	
2003	Pontiac	DAY; 11	TAL; 12	**CHI**; 11	**IND**; 8*	12th	23	
2004	Pontiac	DAY; 6	TEX; 7	RCH; 8	ATL; 11	9th	28	
2005	Pontiac	DAY; 8	TEX; 10	RCH; 11	ATL; 4	9th	32	

=== Superstar Racing Experience ===
(key) * – Most laps led. ^{1} – Heat 1 winner. ^{2} – Heat 2 winner.

Superstar Racing Experience results
Year	No.	1	2	3	4	5	6	SRXC	Pts
2021	3	STA; 4	KNX; 5	ELD; 3	IRP; 9^{2}	SLG; 10	NSV; 9^{2}	5th	140
2022	06	FIF; 1^{2}	SBO; 5^{2}	STA	NSV; 5	I55	SHA	12th	45
2023	06	STA	STA II	MMI; 6	BER; 8	ELD	LOS; 9	16th	0^{1}

== Bibliography ==
- Johnson, Paul, ed. (2002). "Helio Castroneves". Indy Review 2001. Vol. 11. St. Paul, Minnesota: MBI Publishing Company. ISBN 0-7603-1320-2 – via Internet Archive.
- L. Evers, John (2004). "Helio Castroneves (May 10, 1975–)". In L. Porter, David (ed.). Latino and African American Athletes Today: A Biographical Dictionary. Westport, Connecticut: Greenwood Press. ISBN 978-0-313-32048-4.
- C. Friedman, Ian (2007). "Castroneves, Hélio (1975 –) auto racer". Latino Athletes. New York City, New York: Facts on File. ISBN 978-0-8160-6384-0.
- Hummel, Alan (2007). Penske Racing Team: 40 Years of Excellence. Pepin, Wisconsin: Enthusiast Books. ISBN 978-1-58388-195-8 – via Internet Archive.
- Hollar, Sherman (2010). "Castroneves, Hélio". In Jacobs Sparks, Karen; C. Shepherd, Melinda (eds.). Britannica Book of the Year 2010. Chicago, United States: Encyclopedia Britannica, Inc. ISBN 978-1-61535-366-8.
- Castroneves, Hélio; Matteo, Marissa (2010). Victory Road: The Ride of My Life. London, England: Penguin Publishing Group. ISBN 978-0-451-22737-9 – via Internet Archive.

== Notes ==
Sporting positions
Preceded by Juan Pablo Montoya	Indianapolis 500; Winner; 2001–2002	Succeeded by Gil de Ferran
Preceded by Scott Dixon	Indianapolis 500; Winner; 2009	Succeeded by Dario Franchitti
Preceded by Juan Pablo Montoya; Dane Cameron	IMSA SportsCar Championship; Champion; 2020; With: Ricky Taylor	Succeeded by Pipo Derani; Felipe Nasr
Preceded by Takuma Sato	Indianapolis 500; Winner; 2021	Succeeded by Marcus Ericsson
Awards and achievements
Preceded by Juan Pablo Montoya	Indianapolis 500 Rookie of the Year; 2001	Succeeded by Alex Barron; Tomas Scheckter
Preceded by Buddy Lazier	Scott Brayton Award; 2004	Succeeded by Kenny Bräck
Preceded by Apolo Anton Ohno & Julianne Hough	Dancing with the Stars (US) winners Season 5 With: Julianne Hough	Succeeded by Kristi Yamaguchi and Mark Ballas
