= 2011 Winton 300 =

2011 V8 Supercar championship race

(Victoria (state)) 2011 Winton 300
Event Information
- Round 5 of 14 in the 2011 International V8 Supercars Championship
- Date: 20–22 May 2011
- Location: Benalla, Victoria
- Venue: Winton Motor Raceway
- Weather: Fine, overcast

Results
Race 1
Distance	40 laps	120 km
Pole position	Craig Lowndes; Triple Eight Race Engineering	1:22.0979
Winner	Jamie Whincup; Triple Eight Race Engineering	1:01:09.0173
Race 2
Distance	67 laps	200 km
Pole position	Mark Winterbottom; Ford Performance Racing	1:22.5338
Winner	Jason Bright; Brad Jones Racing	1:40:15.5814

The 2011 Winton 300 was a motor race for the Australian sedan-based V8 Supercars racing cars. It was the fifth event of the 2011 International V8 Supercars Championship. It was held on the weekend of May 20 to 22 at the Winton Motor Raceway near Benalla, Victoria.

The event hosted races 10 and 11 of the 2011 season. A 40 lap, 120-kilometre race was held on Saturday while a 67 lap, 200-kilometre race was held on Sunday. Both races were preceded by a 20-minute qualifying session to decide the grid.

Jamie Whincup continued his strong start to the season with a win and a second place. Jason Bright took his second win in as many events by taking out the second race. Steven Johnson recorded his first podium finish for the year, only narrowly beaten to second place in the Saturday race by Lee Holdsworth. Whincup increased his championship lead to 262 points.

== Standings ==
- After 11 of 28 races.

Pos	No	Name	Team	Points
1	88	Jamie Whincup	Triple Eight Race Engineering	1234
2	888	Craig Lowndes	Triple Eight Race Engineering	972
3	2	Garth Tander	Holden Racing Team	935
4	8	Jason Bright	Brad Jones Racing	920
5	9	Shane van Gisbergen	Stone Brothers Racing	913
