= Trevor Carlin =

British motor racing team owner

- Born: Trevor John Carlin; 13 March 1963 (age 63); St Albans, United Kingdom
- Occupation: Motorsport team owner

Trevor John Carlin (born 13 March 1963) is a British motorsports team manager. He founded Carlin Motorsport and ran the team under that name (1996–2008), Carlin (2009–2022) and Rodin Carlin (2023).

== Career ==
As a schoolboy in Hertfordshire, Carlin began working as a gofer with the PRS Formula Ford 1600 company of his uncles Vic and Steve Hollman. After leaving school, he worked with PRS as a mechanic, building the company's FF1600 and Formula Ford 2000 cars. He then joined Formula 2 and 3 powerhouse Ralt, and during the mid-1980s was sent by the company to the United States to work at its Ralt America offshoot, working with customers in Formula Atlantic and Formula Super Vee.

In 1988, Steve Hollman formed Bowman Racing to compete in British Formula 3. Carlin returned from the US to act as team manager. From 1988 to 1992 the team competed in British F3, winning the overall championship and the Macau Grand Prix with David Brabham in 1989, and claiming race victories with Gary Brabham, Philippe Adams and Steve Robertson – all in Ralt cars. Bowman also constructed its own F3 cars from 1991, designed by former Ralt staffer Bruce Carey. While at Bowman, Carlin worked with engineers Adrian Burgess and Anthony 'Boyo' Hieatt – the nucleus of the early days of Carlin Motorsport.

After Bowman Racing pulled out of British F3, Carlin attempted to set up a team for 1993 using the Dallara car – then the pacesetting machine in Europe – with Robertson driving. Without finance to make this happen, he accepted a job to work as a mechanic for Walker Racing in the CART Indycar series. He had just returned to England to collect his belongings when he received a call from West Surrey Racing boss Dick Bennetts. Carlin accepted the job of team manager for the British F3 season and was later reunited with Hieatt and Carey, who also joined WSR. After the Dallara showed amazing form in the some early-season British F3 races in 1993, WSR switched from Reynard to the Italian car. By 1994 nearly every car on the grid was a Dallara. With WSR, Carlin won British F3 races with Marc Goossens, Vincent Radermecker and Cristiano da Matta.

For 1996, WSR switched from F3 to the British Touring Car Championship as the works team for Ford, with Paul Radisich and Robertson driving. The project was underfunded and uncompetitive, and Carlin left. Along with AMT founder Martin Stone, he began running the Williams Pitstop Challenge for the F1 team – a travelling road show. Meanwhile, veteran driver coach and ex-Ralt F3 race winner Rob Wilson introduced a young protégé Henry Stanton to Carlin. This allowed Carlin and Stone the means to establish an F3 team – Carlin Motorsport – from a barn on a farm in Woking, with Stanton driving. The team began competing in 1997, but the farm was sold to McLaren to build its new McLaren Technology Centre. Carlin Motorsport moved into the Byfleet former premises of Weylock Racing before heading to Aldershot.

In 1998, the team began running Narain Karthikeyan after testing a young karter called Jenson Button, who was managed by Steve Robertson and his father David, to assess his potential for car racing. Suitably encouraged, the Robertsons found Button a seat in Formula Ford. Karthikeyan, meanwhile, gave Carlin Motorsport its first race win in the Madras Grand Prix in January 1999 and its first British F3 victory at Brands Hatch in April of that year.

Karthikeyan was friends with an inexperienced young Japanese driver called Takuma Sato, who joined Carlin Motorsport in 2000. In 2001, Sato gave the team its first championship title in British F3, also winning the Macau GP and Marlboro Masters of F3 at Zandvoort. Across the year, Sato won 17 races across all competitions and team-mate Anthony Davidson, an F3 rookie, won eight; they were engineered by Hieatt and Burgess respectively.

This established Carlin Motorsport as the pre-eminent force in British F3, and the team won another title with Alan van der Merwe in 2003. Over the winter of 2004–05, Carlin was appointed by new Jordan F1 managing director Colin Kolles, whose F3 Euro Series team Carlin had helped, as team principal. Burgess also joined Jordan as sporting director, while Hieatt left Carlin Motorsport to establish Räikkönen Robertson Racing with the Robertson family. Carlin left Jordan in the middle of the 2005 season, while Burgess soon left too to work very successfully in Australian V8 Supercars. Carlin Motorsport itself went from strength to strength, with Alvaro Parente winning the British F3 title in 2005, Jaime Alguersuari doing the same in 2008, and Daniel Ricciardo following suit in 2009. The team had also become established as a leading contender in World Series by Nissan and then World Series by Renault, winning races with drivers including Tiago Monteiro, Will Power, Sebastian Vettel and Robert Wickens. Further race victories had come in Porsche Supercup in 2001 (the team run by Carlin's uncle Steve Hollman) and in Formula BMW UK from 2004 to 2007.

At the end of the 2009 season, Carlin relinquished overall control of the team to Capsicum Motorsport, the company of Grahame Chilton (father of Max Chilton, who drove for the team in F3 and GP2) and Rupert Swallow, but continued as team principal of the squad, which was now rebranded simply as Carlin. In 2011, the team moved into a new facility on the outskirts of Farnham.

With Carlin leading from the front, the team continued under the umbrella of Capsicum until early 2023, when the Capsicum share transferred to Rodin Cars impresario David Dicker. The company continued as Rodin Carlin in 2023, again with Carlin heading the operation, until he departed late in the year, followed by wife Stephanie, who left her deputy team principal role and joined the McLaren F1 team as business operations director.

During the 2010-2023 period, Carlin took the team into F3 Euro Series/FIA European F3, GP2/Formula 2, GP3/FIA Formula 3, Formula E (one season running Mahindra's team), British F4, BRDC British F3/GB3, Euroformula Open, Asian Le Mans Series, Spanish F4 and F1 Academy. Carlin also established a US arm to compete first in Indy Lights and then in IndyCar with Max Chilton, initially in the former premises of Dyson Racing in New York State and then in Florida. This closed at the end of 2021.

Further championship wins in the 2010-2023 period in Carlin-run cars were achieved by Mikhail Aleshin (2010 World Series by Renault), Jean-Éric Vergne (2010 British F3), Robert Wickens (2011 World Series by Renault), Felipe Nasr (2011 British F3), Jack Harvey (2012 British F3), Antonio Felix da Costa (2012 and 2016 Macau GP), Jordan King (2013 British F3), Alex Lynn (2014 GP3), Lando Norris (2015 British F4 and 2017 FIA F3 European Championship), Ed Jones (2016 Indy Lights), Max Fewtrell (2016 British F4), Enaam Ahmed (2017 BRDC British F3), Jamie Caroline (2017 British F4), Clement Novalak (2019 BRDC British F3), Zane Maloney (2019 British F4), Kaylen Frederick (2020 BRDC British F3), Zak O'Sullivan (2021 GB3), Callum Voisin (2023 GB3) and Louis Sharp (2023 British F4).

Under Carlin as team principal, the Carlin team secured overall victory in almost 500 races from 1999 to 2023. No fewer than 28 of its graduates have gone on to race in F1: Sebastian Vettel, Lando Norris, George Russell, Carlos Sainz Jr., Daniel Ricciardo, Yuki Tsunoda, Kevin Magnussen, Nico Rosberg, Robert Kubica, Takuma Sato, Bruno Senna, Anthony Davidson, Narain Karthikeyan, Tiago Monteiro, Marcus Ericsson, Antonio Giovinazzi, Daniil Kvyat, Jean-Éric Vergne, Jaime Alguersuari, Sébastien Buemi, Jolyon Palmer, Felipe Nasr, Brendon Hartley, Max Chilton, Logan Sargeant, Nicholas Latifi, Will Stevens and Rio Haryanto.

Those to drive under Carlin at his team have also claimed IndyCar championship titles (Will Power and Josef Newgarden), Indy 500 victories (Sato, Power, Ericsson and Newgarden), Le Mans 24 Hours wins (Buemi, Hartley, Giovinazzi and James Calado), and top-class World Endurance Championship crowns (Buemi, Davidson and Hartley).

In late 2026 it was announced that Carlin would become team principal of Vanwall's German Formula 4 team for the 2027 season. Carlin would be responsible for overseeing the team's activities within the championship, bringing extensive experience in junior single-seater racing.

== See also ==
- Carlin race results
