= Carlin race results =

The list comprises all Carlin race results.

== Complete former series results ==
=== FIA Formula 2 ===
Year	Chassis	Engine	Tyres	Drivers	Races	Wins	Poles	F. Laps	Podiums	D.C.	Pts	T.C.	Pts
2018	Dallara; F2 2018	Mecachrome; V634T V6 t	P	(Brazil) Sérgio Sette Câmara	22	0	1	3	8	6th	164	1st	383
2018	Dallara; F2 2018	Mecachrome; V634T V6 t	P	(United Kingdom) Lando Norris	24	1	1	1	9	**2nd**	**219**	1st	383
2019	Dallara; F2 2018	Mecachrome; V634T V6 t	P	(Switzerland) Louis Delétraz	22	0	0	0	3	8th	92	4th	236
2019	Dallara; F2 2018	Mecachrome; V634T V6 t	P	(Japan) Nobuharu Matsushita	22	2	1	4	5	6th	144	4th	236
2020	Dallara; F2 2018	Mecachrome; V634T V6 t	P	(Japan) Yuki Tsunoda	24	3	4	1	7	**3rd**	**200**	3rd	272
2020	Dallara; F2 2018	Mecachrome; V634T V6 t	P	(India) Jehan Daruvala	24	1	0	1	2	12th	72	3rd	272
2021	Dallara; F2 2018	Mecachrome; V634T V6 t	P	(United Kingdom) Dan Ticktum	23	2	0	1	7	4th	159.5	**3rd**	**272.5**
2021	Dallara; F2 2018	Mecachrome; V634T V6 t	P	(India) Jehan Daruvala	23	2	0	1	5	7th	113	**3rd**	**272.5**
2022	Dallara; F2 2018	Mecachrome; V634T V6 t	P	(New Zealand) Liam Lawson	28	4	0	3	10	**3rd**	**149**	2nd	297
2022	Dallara; F2 2018	Mecachrome; V634T V6 t	P	(United States) Logan Sargeant	28	2	2	0	4	4th	148	2nd	297
2023	Dallara; F2 2018	Mecachrome; V634T V6 t	P	(Barbados) Zane Maloney	26	0	0	1	4	10th	96	3rd	220
2023	Dallara; F2 2018	Mecachrome; V634T V6 t	P	(Brazil) Enzo Fittipaldi	26	1	0	1	5	7th	124	3rd	220

==== In detail ====
Year	Drivers	1	2	3	4	5	6	7	8	9	10	11	12	13	14	15	16	17	18	19	20	21	22	23	24	25	26	27	28	T.C.	Points
2018		BHR; FEA	BHR; SPR	BAK; FEA	BAK; SPR	CAT; FEA	CAT; SPR	MCO; FEA	MCO; SPR	LEC; FEA	LEC; SPR	RBR; FEA	RBR; SPR	SIL; FEA	SIL; SPR	HUN; FEA	HUN; SPR	SPA; FEA	SPA; SPR	MNZ; FEA	MNZ; SPR	SOC; FEA	SOC; SPR	YMC; FEA	YMC; SPR					1st	383
2018	(Brazil) Sérgio Sette Câmara	2	3	4	DSQ	7	Ret	DNS	DNS	2	6	6	3	Ret	17^{F}	7^{P}	3	2	9	7^{F}	3^{F}	5	2	16	10					1st	383
2018	(United Kingdom) Lando Norris	1^{P F}	4	6	4	3	3	6	3	16	5	2	11	10	3	2	4	4	2	6	5	Ret	Ret	5	2					1st	383
2019		BHR; FEA	BHR; SPR	BAK; FEA	BAK; SPR	CAT; FEA	CAT; SPR	MCO; FEA	MCO; SPR	LEC; FEA	LEC; SPR	RBR; FEA	RBR; SPR	SIL; FEA	SIL; SPR	HUN; FEA	HUN; SPR	SPA; FEA	SPA; SPR	MNZ; FEA	MNZ; SPR	SOC; FEA	SOC; SPR	YMC; FEA	YMC; SPR					4th	236
2019	(Switzerland) Louis Delétraz	5	5	Ret	Ret	12	11	7	2	NC	7	7	Ret	7	2	Ret	13	C	C	Ret	8	3	14	4	6					4th	236
2019	(Japan) Nobuharu Matsushita	9	12	13^{P F}	12	11	Ret	2^{F}	9	9	9^{F}	1	5	9	7	7	2^{F}	C	C	1	5	6	Ret	2	7					4th	236
2020		RBR; FEA	RBR; SPR	RBR; FEA	RBR; SPR	HUN; FEA	HUN; SPR	SIL; FEA	SIL; SPR	SIL; FEA	SIL; SPR	CAT; FEA	CAT; SPR	SPA; FEA	SPA; SPR	MNZ; FEA	MNZ; SPR	MUG; FEA	MUG; SPR	SOC; FEA	SOC; SPR	BHR; FEA	BHR; SPR	BHR; FEA	BHR; SPR					3rd	272
2020	(Japan) Yuki Tsunoda	18	11	2^{P}	Ret	16	18	3	Ret	6	1	4	4	1^{P}	9	4	NC^{F}	16	19	2^{P}	6	6	15	1^{P}	2					3rd	272
2020	(India) Jehan Daruvala	12	16	12	9	6	7	12	4	12^{F}	9	17	17	19	16	10	6	10	7	5	11	3	Ret	7	1					3rd	272
2021		BHR; SP1	BHR; SP2	BHR; FEA	MCO; SP1	MCO; SP2	MCO; FEA	BAK; SP1	BAK; SP2	BAK; FEA	SIL; SP1	SIL; SP2	SIL; FEA	MNZ; SP1	MNZ; SP2	MNZ; FEA	SOC; SP1	SOC; SP2	SOC; FEA	JED; SP1	JED; SP2	JED; FEA	YMC; SP1	YMC; SP2	YMC; FEA					3rd	272.5
2021	(United Kingdom) Dan Ticktum	8	Ret	2	6	1	Ret	2	6	8^{F}	8	3	2	Ret	11	3	1	C	5	7	4	10	6	4	6					3rd	272.5
2021	(India) Jehan Daruvala	2	4	6	11	8	Ret	4	3	7	12	19	10^{F}	9	1	5	12	C	3	10	14	11	1	7	11					3rd	272.5
2022		BHR; SPR	BHR; FEA	JED; SPR	JED; FEA	IMO; SPR	IMO; FEA	CAT; SPR	CAT; FEA	MCO; SPR	MCO; FEA	BAK; SPR	BAK; FEA	SIL; SPR	SIL; FEA	RBR; SPR	RBR; FEA	LEC; SPR	LEC; FEA	HUN; SPR	HUN; FEA	SPA; SPR	SPA; FEA	ZAN; SPR	ZAN; FEA	MNZ; SPR	MNZ; FEA	YMC; SPR	YMC; FEA	2nd	297
2022	(New Zealand) Liam Lawson	3	2	1	Ret	8	Ret	9	9	8	Ret	3	15	20	3	Ret	10	1^{F}	6	6	7	1^{F}	3	4	12	5	13	1^{F}	3	2nd	297
2022	(United States) Logan Sargeant	6	7	Ret	12	6	7	3	4	10	9	6	2	7	1^{P}	7	1	8	Ret^{P}	Ret	10	Ret	5	8	Ret	4	Ret	6	5	2nd	297
2023		BHR; SPR	BHR; FEA	JED; SPR	JED; FEA	ALB; SPR	ALB; FEA	BAK; SPR	BAK; FEA	MCO; SPR	MCO; FEA	CAT; SPR	CAT; FEA	RBR; SPR	RBR; FEA	SIL; SPR	SIL; FEA	HUN; SPR	HUN; FEA	SPA; SPR	SPA; FEA	ZAN; SPR	ZAN; FEA	MNZ; SPR	MNZ; FEA	YMC; SPR	YMC; FEA			3rd	220
2023	(Barbados) Zane Maloney	9	3	Ret	17	5	5	Ret	11	5	3	14	16	18^{F}	15	10	2	12	16	10	4	5	2	14	Ret	9	17†			3rd	220
2023	(Brazil) Enzo Fittipaldi	8	9	13	7	DNS	Ret	5	2	10	Ret	10	2	Ret	6	4	7	11	8	1^{F}	3	15	7	15	4	2	14			3rd	220

=== FIA Formula 3 ===
Year	Chassis	Engine	Tyres	Driver	Races	Wins	Poles	F. Laps	Podiums	D.C.	Pts	T.C.	Pts
2019	Dallara; F3 2019	Mecachrome; V634 V6	P	(Japan) Teppei Natori	16	0	0	0	0	24th	1	9th	14
2019	Dallara; F3 2019	Mecachrome; V634 V6	P	(Brazil) Felipe Drugovich	16	0	0	1	0	16th	8	9th	14
2019	Dallara; F3 2019	Mecachrome; V634 V6	P	(United States) Logan Sargeant	16	0	0	1	0	19th	5	9th	14
2020	Dallara; F3 2019	Mecachrome; V634 V6	P	(United Kingdom) Clément Novalak	18	0	0	2	2	12th	45	8th	46
2020	Dallara; F3 2019	Mecachrome; V634 V6	P	(United Kingdom) Enaam Ahmed	6	0	0	0	0	32nd	0	8th	46
2020	Dallara; F3 2019	Mecachrome; V634 V6	P	(United Kingdom) Ben Barnicoat	4	0	0	0	0	22nd	1	8th	46
2020	Dallara; F3 2019	Mecachrome; V634 V6	P	(Italy) Leonardo Pulcini	2	0	0	0	0	33rd	0	8th	46
2020	Dallara; F3 2019	Mecachrome; V634 V6	P	(Germany) David Schumacher	6	0	0	0	0	28th	0	8th	46
2020	Dallara; F3 2019	Mecachrome; V634 V6	P	(United States) Cameron Das	18	0	0	0	0	25th	0	8th	46
2021	Dallara; F3 2019	Mecachrome; V634 V6	P	(Israel) Ido Cohen	20	0	0	0	0	24th	0	10th	25
2021	Dallara; F3 2019	Mecachrome; V634 V6	P	(United States) Kaylen Frederick	13	0	0	0	0	22nd	2	10th	25
2021	Dallara; F3 2019	Mecachrome; V634 V6	P	(United Kingdom) Jake Hughes	3	0	0	0	0	27th	0	10th	25
2021	Dallara; F3 2019	Mecachrome; V634 V6	P	(United Kingdom) Jonny Edgar	20	0	0	0	0	18th	23	10th	25
2022	Dallara; F3 2019	Mecachrome; V634 V6	P	(United Kingdom) Zak O'Sullivan	18	0	1	1	2	11th	54	7th	57
2022	Dallara; F3 2019	Mecachrome; V634 V6	P	(United States) Brad Benavides	18	0	0	0	0	23rd	3	7th	57
2022	Dallara; F3 2019	Mecachrome; V634 V6	P	(Italy) Enzo Trulli	18	0	0	0	0	34th	0	7th	57
2023	Dallara; F3 2019	Mecachrome; V634 V6	P	(United Kingdom) Oliver Gray	18	0	0	0	0	28th	0	10th	2
2023	Dallara; F3 2019	Mecachrome; V634 V6	P	(United States) Hunter Yeany	10	0	0	0	0	30th	0	10th	2
2023	Dallara; F3 2019	Mecachrome; V634 V6	P	(United States) Max Esterson	4	0	0	0	0	35th	0	10th	2
2023	Dallara; F3 2019	Mecachrome; V634 V6	P	(Italy) Francesco Simonazzi	4	0	0	0	0	26th	0	10th	2
2023	Dallara; F3 2019	Mecachrome; V634 V6	P	(Israel) Ido Cohen	18	0	0	0	0	24th	2	10th	2

* Season still in progress

==== In detail ====
(key)

Year	Drivers	1	2	3	4	5	6	7	8	9	10	11	12	13	14	15	16	17	18	19	20	21	T.C.	Points
2019		CAT; FEA	CAT; SPR	LEC; FEA	LEC; SPR	RBR; FEA	RBR; SPR	SIL; FEA	SIL; SPR	HUN; FEA	HUN; SPR	SPA; FEA	SPA; SPR	MNZ; FEA	MNZ; SPR	SOC; FEA	SOC; SPR						9th	14
2019	(Japan) Teppei Natori	24	15	Ret	Ret	Ret	22	25	16	20	Ret	11	8	11	29†	20	19						9th	14
2019	(Brazil) Felipe Drugovich	11	10	19^{F}	10	12	14	13	10	6	Ret	18	9	16	12	25	15						9th	14
2019	(United States) Logan Sargeant	15	14	12	8	22	26	26^{F}	13	10	8	13	Ret	9	10	15	10						9th	14
2020		RBR; FEA	RBR; SPR	RBR; FEA	RBR; SPR	HUN; FEA	HUN; SPR	SIL; FEA	SIL; SPR	SIL; FEA	SIL; SPR	CAT; FEA	CAT; SPR	SPA; FEA	SPA; SPR	MNZ; FEA	MNZ; SPR	MUG; FEA	MUG; SPR				8th	46
2020	(United Kingdom) Clément Novalak	10	3	29	25	9	12	8^{F}	2	12	9	4	11	NC	15	13	Ret^{F}	24	14				8th	46
2020	(United Kingdom) Enaam Ahmed	23	24	19	15	14	21																8th	46
2020	(United Kingdom) Ben Barnicoat							20	12	10	Ret												8th	46
2020	(Italy) Leonardo Pulcini											16	24										8th	46
2020	(Germany) David Schumacher													17	14	19	Ret	15	19				8th	46
2020	(United States) Cameron Das	22	Ret	24	Ret	17	22	21	24	11	11	19	17	25	22	15	16	23	25				8th	46
2021		CAT; SP1	CAT; SP2	CAT; FEA	LEC; SP1	LEC; SP2	LEC; FEA	RBR; SP1	RBR; SP2	RBR; FEA	HUN; SP1	HUN; SP2	HUN; FEA	SPA; SP1	SPA; SP2	SPA; FEA	ZAN; SP1	ZAN; SP2	ZAN; FEA	SOC; SP1	SOC; SP2	SOC; FEA	10th	25
2021	(Israel) Ido Cohen	29	20	22	24	Ret	24	Ret	20	16	28†	27	Ret	Ret	20	20	12	26†	16	27	C	Ret	10th	25
2021	(United States) Kaylen Frederick	22	17	30	20	22	17	9	Ret	DNS							20	11	21	23	C	13	10th	25
2021	(United Kingdom) Jake Hughes										16	17	13										10th	25
2021	(United Kingdom) Jonny Edgar	5	6	16	28	23	14	6	5	10	Ret	26	Ret	21	17	19	19	25	15	18	C	14	10th	25
2022		BHR; SPR	BHR; FEA	IMO; SPR	IMO; FEA	CAT; SPR	CAT; FEA	SIL; SPR	SIL; FEA	RBR; SPR	RBR; FEA	HUN; SPR	HUN; FEA	SPA; SPR	SPA; FEA	ZAN; SPR	ZAN; FEA	MNZ; SPR	MNZ; FEA				7th	57
2022	(United Kingdom) Zak O'Sullivan	6	18	Ret	6	18	27†	14	2^{P}	12	17	18	4^{F}	20	13	3	23	Ret	11				7th	57
2022	(United States) Brad Benavides	21	20	14	Ret	25	Ret	NC	20	20	20	Ret	22	8	18	26	Ret	18	14				7th	57
2022	(Italy) Enzo Trulli	20	26	22	24	22	24	27	17	25	18	24	19	DSQ	24	23	17	20	22				7th	57
2023		BHR; SPR	BHR; FEA	ALB; SPR	ALB; FEA	MCO; SPR	MCO; FEA	CAT; SPR	CAT; FEA	RBR; SPR	RBR; FEA	SIL; SPR	SIL; FEA	HUN; SPR	HUN; FEA	SPA; SPR	SPA; FEA	MNZ; SPR	MNZ; FEA				10th	2
2023	(United Kingdom) Oliver Gray	21	21	20	14	22	19	15	18	Ret	14	25	20	14	27	20	Ret	Ret	16				10th	2
2023	(United States) Hunter Yeany	20	22	22	17	27	20	16	Ret	19	21												10th	2
2023	(United States) Max Esterson											24	Ret	18	21								10th	2
2023	(Italy) Francesco Simonazzi															14	24	18	11				10th	2
2023	(Israel) Ido Cohen	18	18	Ret	Ret	19	Ret	Ret	26	17	Ret	9	24	Ret	22	Ret	Ret	21	Ret				10th	2

=== Macau Grand Prix ===
Macau Grand Prix results
Year	Car	Driver	Races	Wins	Poles	F/Laps	Podiums	Qualifying	Race 1 Pos	Race 2 Pos	Drivers' Series
2005	Dallara F305 Mugen-Honda	(Poland) Robert Kubica	2	0	0	1	2	**3rd**	**2nd**	**2nd**	FR3.5
2005	Dallara F305 Mugen-Honda	(United States) Charlie Kimball	2	0	0	0	0	13th	9th	Ret	British F3
2005	Dallara F305 Mugen-Honda	(Denmark) Christian Bakkerud	2	0	0	0	0	15th	11th	7th	British F3
2006	Dallara F306 Mugen-Honda	(Germany) Sebastian Vettel	2	0	0	9	9	10th	Ret	23rd	F3 Euro Series
2006	Dallara F306 Mugen-Honda	(United Kingdom) Oliver Jarvis	2	0	0	0	0	22nd	11th	15th	British F3
2006	Dallara F306 Mugen-Honda	(Switzerland) Sébastien Buemi	2	0	0	0	0	17th	12th	4th	F3 Euro Series
2006	Dallara F306 Mugen-Honda	(Germany) Maro Engel	2	0	0	0	0	14th	Ret	9th	British F3
2007	Dallara F307 Mercedes-HWA	(New Zealand) Brendon Hartley	2	0	0	0	0	21st	12th	12th	FR2.0
2007	Dallara F307 Mercedes-HWA	(United Kingdom) Sam Bird	2	0	0	0	0	16th	5th	6th	British F3
2007	Dallara F307 Mercedes-HWA	(Republic of Ireland) Niall Breen	2	0	0	0	0	17th	10th	Ret	British F3
2007	Dallara F307 Mercedes-HWA	(Macau) Lei Kit Meng	2	0	0	0	0	29th	Ret	21st	China Circuit Champ.
2008	Dallara F308 Mercedes-HWA	(United Kingdom) Oliver Turvey	2	0	0	0	0	8th	4th	7th	British F3
2008	Dallara F308 Mercedes-HWA	(Spain) Jaime Alguersuari	2	0	0	0	0	9th	6th	10th	British F3
2008	Dallara F308 Mercedes-HWA	(New Zealand) Brendon Hartley	2	0	0	0	0	11th	Ret	**3rd**	British F3
2008	Dallara F308 Mercedes-HWA	(Sweden) Marcus Ericsson	2	0	0	0	0	15th	8th	Ret	British F3
2009	Dallara F309 Volkswagen	(Australia) Daniel Ricciardo	2	0	0	0	0	5th	6th	Ret	British F3
2009	Dallara F309 Volkswagen	(New Zealand) Brendon Hartley	2	0	0	0	0	12th	24th	Ret	F3 Euro Series
2009	Dallara F309 Volkswagen	(United Kingdom) Max Chilton	2	0	0	0	0	17th	15th	Ret	British F3
2009	Dallara F309 Volkswagen	(United Kingdom) Henry Arundel	2	0	0	0	0	27th	Ret	16th	British F3
2010	Dallara F308 Volkswagen	(France) Jean-Éric Vergne	2	0	0	0	0	11th	7th	7th	British F3
2010	Dallara F308 Volkswagen	(United Kingdom) James Calado	2	0	0	0	0	17th	Ret	19th	British F3
2010	Dallara F308 Volkswagen	(Malaysia) Jazeman Jaafar	2	0	0	0	0	14th	13th	14th	British F3
2010	Dallara F308 Volkswagen	(Portugal) António Félix da Costa	2	0	0	0	0	13th	9th	6th	F3 Euro Series
2011	Dallara F308 Volkswagen	(Brazil) Felipe Nasr	2	0	0	0	2	6th	**2nd**	**2nd**	British F3
2011	Dallara F308 Volkswagen	(Denmark) Kevin Magnussen	2	0	0	0	0	7th	19th	14th	British F3
2011	Dallara F308 Volkswagen	(Malaysia) Jazeman Jaafar	2	0	0	0	0	17th	17th	8th	British F3
2011	Dallara F308 Volkswagen	(Colombia) Carlos Huertas	2	0	0	0	0	9th	19th	14th	British F3
2012	Dallara F312 Volkswagen	(Brazil) Felipe Nasr	2	0	0	0	0	6th	9th	5th	GP2
2012	Dallara F312 Volkswagen	(Germany) Daniel Abt	2	0	0	0	0	9th	15th	12th	GP3
2012	Dallara F312 Volkswagen	(Portugal) António Félix da Costa	2	2	1	1	2	**2nd**	**1st**	**1st**	GP3
2012	Dallara F312 Volkswagen	(Spain) Carlos Sainz Jr.	2	0	0	0	0	5th	4th	7th	European F3
2012	Dallara F312 Volkswagen	(United Kingdom) William Buller	2	0	0	0	0	17th	14th	10th	European F3
2012	Dallara F312 Volkswagen	(United Kingdom) Jack Harvey	2	0	0	0	0	13th	12th	Ret	European F3
2013	Dallara F312 Volkswagen	(Portugal) António Félix da Costa	2	0	0	0	1	5th	4th	**2nd**	FR3.5
2013	Dallara F312 Volkswagen	(Spain) Carlos Sainz Jr.	2	0	0	0	0	14th	9th	7th	GP3
2013	Dallara F312 Volkswagen	(United Kingdom) Harry Tincknell	2	0	0	0	0	9th	Ret	14th	European F3
2013	Dallara F312 Volkswagen	(Malaysia) Jazeman Jaafar	2	0	0	0	0	8th	12th	6th	FR3.5
2013	Dallara F312 Volkswagen	(United Kingdom) Jordan King	2	0	0	0	0	10th	7th	5th	British F3
2013	Dallara F312 Volkswagen	(Canada) Nicholas Latifi	2	0	0	0	0	16th	13th	9th	European F3
2014	Dallara F312 Volkswagen	(United Kingdom) Tom Blomqvist	2	0	1	0	1	7th	**3rd**	Ret	European F3
2014	Dallara F312 Volkswagen	(United Kingdom) Jordan King	2	0	0	0	0	5th	8th	Ret	European F3
2014	Dallara F312 Volkswagen	(Italy) Antonio Giovinazzi	2	0	0	0	0	12th	Ret	12th	European F3
2014	Dallara F312 Volkswagen	(Indonesia) Sean Gelael	2	0	0	0	0	13th	Ret	15th	European F3
2014	Dallara F312 Volkswagen	(Japan) Yu Kanamaru	2	0	0	0	0	19th	13th	Ret	Euroformula
2015	Dallara F312 Volkswagen	(Italy) Antonio Giovinazzi	2	0	0	0	0	4th	10th	4th	European F3
2015	Dallara F312 Volkswagen	(United States) Gustavo Menezes	2	0	0	0	0	25th	19th	Ret	European F3
2015	Dallara F312 Volkswagen	(Japan) Yu Kanamaru	2	0	0	0	0	19th	20th	Ret	FR3.5
2015	Dallara F312 Volkswagen	(United Kingdom) Callum Ilott	2	0	0	0	0	18th	Ret	Ret	European F3
2016	Dallara F312 Volkswagen	(United Kingdom) Lando Norris	2	0	0	0	0	9th	Ret	11th	FR2.0
2016	Dallara F312 Volkswagen	(Brazil) Sérgio Sette Câmara	2	0	0	0	2	4th	**3rd**	**3rd**	European F3
2016	Dallara F312 Volkswagen	(United Kingdom) Jake Hughes	2	0	0	0	0	6th	10th	6th	GP3
2016	Dallara F312 Volkswagen	(Portugal) António Félix da Costa	2	2	1	0	2	**3rd**	**1st**	**1st**	Formula E
2017	Dallara F312 Volkswagen	(United Kingdom) Lando Norris	2	0	0	0	1	**2nd**	7th	**2nd**	European F3
2017	Dallara F312 Volkswagen	(India) Jehan Daruvala	2	0	0	0	0	19th	16th	10th	European F3
2017	Dallara F312 Volkswagen	(Austria) Ferdinand Habsburg	2	0	0	0	0	5th	5th	4th	European F3
2017	Dallara F312 Volkswagen	(France) Sacha Fenestraz	2	0	0	0	0	11th	12th	7th	FR2.0
2017	Dallara F312 Volkswagen	(Canada) Devlin DeFrancesco	2	0	0	0	0	14th	21st	Ret	Euroformula
2018	Dallara F312 Volkswagen	(India) Jehan Daruvala	2	0	0	0	0	19th	17th	12th	European F3
2018	Dallara F312 Volkswagen	(United Kingdom) Callum Ilott	2	0	0	0	1	**2nd**	**3rd**	7th	GP3
2018	Dallara F312 Volkswagen	(France) Sacha Fenestraz	2	0	0	0	1	**3rd**	4th	**3rd**	European F3
2018	Dallara F312 Volkswagen	(Japan) Yoshiaki Katayama	2	0	0	0	0	27th	Ret	17th	All-Japan F3
2019	Dallara F3 2019-Mecachrome	(United States) Logan Sargeant	2	0	0	0	1	10th	6th	**3rd**	FIA F3
2019	Dallara F3 2019-Mecachrome	(United Kingdom) Dan Ticktum	2	0	0	0	0	13th	Ret	13th	Formula Regional
2019	Dallara F3 2019-Mecachrome	(Brazil) Felipe Drugovich	2	0	0	0	0	16th	Ret	24th	FIA F3

=== BRDC British Formula 3 Championship / GB3 Championship ===
Year	Car	Drivers	Races	Wins	Poles	F/Laps	Podiums	Points	D.C.	T.C.
2016	Tatuus-Cosworth F4-016	(United Kingdom) Ricky Collard	23	5	4	4	9	466	**2nd**	N/A
2016	Tatuus-Cosworth F4-016	(United Kingdom) Lando Norris	11	4	4	3	8	247	8th	N/A
2016	Tatuus-Cosworth F4-016	(United States) Colton Herta	6	1	1	2	3	109	19th	N/A
2016	Tatuus-Cosworth F4-016	(India) Ameya Vaidyanathan	15	0	0	0	1	95	22nd	N/A
2016	Tatuus-Cosworth F4-016	(Russia) Nikita Mazepin	3	1	0	0	1	51	23rd	N/A
2016	Tatuus-Cosworth F4-016	(United Kingdom) James Pull	3	0	0	0	0	33	26th	N/A
2017	Tatuus-Cosworth F4-016	(United Kingdom) Enaam Ahmed	24	13	8	13	18	654	**1st**	N/A
2017	Tatuus-Cosworth F4-016	(United Kingdom) James Pull	24	0	1	0	14	490	**2nd**	N/A
2017	Tatuus-Cosworth F4-016	(United States) Cameron Das	24	1	4	3	7	425	5th	N/A
2018	Tatuus-Cosworth F4-016	(Denmark) Nicolai Kjærgaard	23	5	3	4	10	446	**2nd**	N/A
2018	Tatuus-Cosworth F4-016	(United Kingdom) Billy Monger	23	0	2	3	4	301	6th	N/A
2018	Tatuus-Cosworth F4-016	(China) Sun Yueyang	23	1	0	0	2	240	10th	N/A
2018	Tatuus-Cosworth F4-016	(United Kingdom) Jamie Caroline	9	2	1	1	4	164	13th	N/A
2018	Tatuus-Cosworth F4-016	(United Kingdom) Clément Novalak	11	0	1	0	0	120	18th	N/A
2019	Tatuus-Cosworth F4-016	(United Kingdom) Clément Novalak	24	2	2	1	8	505	**1st**	N/A
2019	Tatuus-Cosworth F4-016	(United States) Kaylen Frederick	24	2	1	3	4	305	9th	N/A
2019	Tatuus-Cosworth F4-016	(Sweden) Lucas Petersson	24	1	0	1	1	206	13th	N/A
2020	Tatuus-Cosworth BF3-020	(United States) Kaylen Frederick	24	9	8	12	12	499	**1st**	N/A
2020	Tatuus-Cosworth BF3-020	(Malaysia) Nazim Azman	24	2	0	0	8	370	5th	N/A
2020	Tatuus-Cosworth BF3-020	(Brazil) Guilherme Peixoto	7	0	0	0	0	67	19th	N/A
2021	Tatuus-Cosworth BF3-020	(United Kingdom) Zak O'Sullivan	24	7	5	8	14	535	**1st**	**1st**
2021	Tatuus-Cosworth BF3-020	(Australia) Christian Mansell	24	2	0	1	5	371	**3rd**	**1st**
2021	Tatuus-Cosworth BF3-020	(United States) Bryce Aron	24	0	0	0	0	237	12th	**1st**
2022	Tatuus-Cosworth MSV-022	(United Kingdom) Callum Voisin	24	3	5	4	6	359	4th	**2nd**
2022	Tatuus-Cosworth MSV-022	(Brazil) Roberto Faria	24	0	0	3	6	316.5	5th	**2nd**
2022	Tatuus-Cosworth MSV-022	(Spain) Javier Sagrera	24	0	0	1	1	257.5	9th	**2nd**
2023	Tatuus-Cosworth MSV-022	(United Kingdom) Callum Voisin	23	2	6	1	11	484	**1st**	**2nd**
2023	Tatuus-Cosworth MSV-022	(United Kingdom) John Bennett	23	0	2	0	1	217	10th	**2nd**
2023	Tatuus-Cosworth MSV-022	(Australia) Costa Toparis	23	0	0	0	0	151	15th	**2nd**

* Season still in progress

† Hedley drove for VRD by Arden until round 2 and for Chris Dittmann Racing in round 8.

=== F4 British Championship ===
F4 British Championship results
Year	Car	Drivers	Races	Wins	Poles	F/Laps	Podiums	Points	D.C.	T.C.
2015	Mygale M14-F4	(Romania) Petru Florescu	30	0	0	0	0	99	11th	**1st**
2015	Mygale M14-F4	(United States) Colton Herta	30	4	3	7	12	355	**3rd**	**1st**
2015	Mygale M14-F4	(United Kingdom) Lando Norris	30	8	10	9	14	413	**1st**	**1st**
2016	Mygale M14-F4	(Romania) Petru Florescu	30	5	6	6	8	260	6th	**1st**
2016	Mygale M14-F4	(United Kingdom) Max Fewtrell	30	3	3	3	16	358	**1st**	**1st**
2016	Mygale M14-F4	(Canada) Devlin DeFrancesco	30	3	1	2	10	265	5th	**1st**
2016	Mygale M14-F4	(United Kingdom) James Pull	30	2	1	4	8	291	4th	**1st**
2017	Mygale M14-F4	(Germany) Lucas Alecco Roy	24	0	0	0	0	8	16th	**1st**
2017	Mygale M14-F4	(Finland) Patrik Pasma	24	0	0	1	4	142.5	8th	**1st**
2017	Mygale M14-F4	(United States) Logan Sargeant	24	1	1	2	8	283	**3rd**	**1st**
2017	Mygale M14-F4	(United Kingdom) Jamie Caroline	24	10	4	6	13	364	**1st**	**1st**
2018: "Carlin" did not compete.
2019	Mygale M14-F4	(Barbados) Zane Maloney	30	10	6	5	15	427	**1st**	**2nd**
2019	Mygale M14-F4	(United Kingdom) Joe Turney	15	0	1	2	2	111	10th	**2nd**
2020	Mygale M14-F4	(Australia) Christian Mansell	26	1	0	0	5	163	7th	**1st**
2020	Mygale M14-F4	(United Kingdom) Zak O'Sullivan	26	9	3	5	18	408.5	**2nd**	**1st**
2020	Mygale M14-F4	(Peru) Matías Zagazeta	26	0	0	0	0	34	12th	**1st**
2021	Mygale M14-F4	(United Kingdom) James Hedley †	29	4	2	1	8	226	5th	4th
2021	Mygale M14-F4	(United Kingdom) Kai Askey	30	0	0	0	5	132	8th	4th
2021	Mygale M14-F4	(Thailand) Tasanapol Inthraphuvasak	30	1	0	0	3	123	10th	4th
2021	Mygale M14-F4	(Japan) Dougie Bolger †	30	1	0	0	1	79	15th	4th
2021	Mygale M14-F4	(Poland) Roman Bilinski	12	0	0	0	1	50	17th	4th
2022	Tatuus F4-T421	(United Kingdom) Oliver Gray	30	2	2	0	16	343	**2nd**	**1st**
2022	Tatuus F4-T421	(United States) Ugo Ugochukwu	30	2	3	8	11	290	**3rd**	**1st**
2022	Tatuus F4-T421	(New Zealand) Louis Sharp	27	2	0	1	12	272	4th	**1st**
2023	Tatuus F4-T421	(New Zealand) Louis Sharp	30	6	4	4	14	384	**1st**	**1st**
2023	Tatuus F4-T421	(India) Dion Gowda	29	4	3	1	6	226	4th	**1st**
2023	Tatuus F4-T421	(Australia) Noah Lisle	27	3	2	4	6	156	10th	**1st**
2023	Tatuus F4-T421	(United Kingdom) Josh Irfan	30	2	0	0	3	105	12th	**1st**

* Season still in progress

†Hedley drove for Fortec Motorsport until round 5. Bolger drove for JHR Developments in round 10.

=== Formula 4 UAE Championship ===
Formula 4 UAE Championship results
Year	Car	Drivers	Races	Wins	Poles	F/Laps	Podiums	Points	D.C.	T.C.
2023	Tatuus F4-T421	(United Kingdom) Dion Gowda	15	0	0	0	0	5	25th	12th
2023	Tatuus F4-T421	(Brazil) Fernando Barrichello	9	0	0	0	0	0	42nd	12th

=== F4 Spanish Championship ===
F4 Spanish Championship results
Year	Car	Drivers	Races	Wins	Poles	F/Laps	Podiums	Points	D.C.	T.C.
2023	Tatuus F4-T421	(Australia) Alex Ninovic	21	0	0	0	1	54	10th	5th
2023	Tatuus F4-T421	(Australia) Noah Lisle	18	0	0	0	0	44	11th	5th
2023	Tatuus F4-T421	(United Arab Emirates) Federico Al Rifai	21	0	0	0	0	3	21st	5th

=== F1 Academy ===
F1 Academy results
Year	Car	Drivers	Races	Wins	Poles	F/Laps	Podiums	Points	D.C.	T.C.
2023	Tatuus F4-T421	(United Kingdom) Abbi Pulling	21	0	2	4	7	177	5th	**3rd**
2023	Tatuus F4-T421	(United Kingdom) Jessica Edgar	21	1	1	1	4	112	8th	**3rd**
2023	Tatuus F4-T421	(Canada) Megan Gilkes	21	0	0	0	0	31	13th	**3rd**

=== British Formula 3 Championship ===
British Formula 3 Championship results
Year	Car	Drivers	Races	Wins	Poles	F/Laps	Podiums	Points	D.C.
1997	Dallara F397-Mugen Honda	(United Kingdom) Jamie Spence	1	0	0	0	0	18	14th†
1997	Dallara F397-Mugen Honda	(United Kingdom) Henry Stanton	9	0	0	0	0	2	24th
1998	Dallara F398-Mugen Honda	(India) Narain Karthikeyan	5	0	0	0	2	44	12th†
1998	Dallara F398-Mugen Honda	(Macau) Lei Kit Meng	2	0	0	0	0	0	32nd
1999	Dallara F399-Mugen Honda	(India) Narain Karthikeyan	16	2	2	3	4	104	6th
1999	Dallara F399-Mugen Honda	(United Kingdom) Michael Bentwood	16	0	0	0	0	50	8th
2000	Dallara F300-Mugen Honda	(Japan) Takuma Sato	14	4	5	4	6	129	**3rd**
2000	Dallara F300-Mugen Honda	(United Kingdom) Ben Collins	14	1	1	0	2	67	8th
2000	Dallara F300-Mugen Honda	(United Kingdom) Rob Austin	1	0	0	0	0	0	19th
2001	Dallara F301-Mugen Honda	(Japan) Takuma Sato	26	12	6	15	17	345	**1st**
2001	Dallara F301-Mugen Honda	(United Kingdom) Anthony Davidson	26	6	7	4	14	272	**2nd**
2001	Dallara F301-Mugen Honda	(Japan) Kazuki Hoshino [B]	24	0	0	1	4	133	7th [B]
2002	Dallara F302-Mugen Honda	(Australia) James Courtney	24	5	12	12	11	269	**2nd**
2002	Dallara F302-Mugen Honda	(Republic of Ireland) Michael Keohane	20	2	0	0	8	169	5th
2002	Dallara F302-Mugen Honda	(South Africa) Alan van der Merwe	26	1	0	0	1	98	8th
2002	Dallara F302-Mugen Honda	(Japan) Shinya Hosokawa	24	1	0	0	1	51	12th
2002	Dallara F302-Mugen Honda	(United Kingdom) Derek Hayes	2	0	1	1	2	25	16th
2003	Dallara F303-Mugen Honda	(South Africa) Alan van der Merwe	24	9	4	4	15	308	**1st**
2003	Dallara F303-Mugen Honda	(United Kingdom) Jamie Green	24	4	3	4	12	237	**2nd**
2003	Dallara F303-Mugen Honda	(United States) Richard Antinucci	24	0	0	2	4	125.5	4th
2003	Dallara F303-Mugen Honda	(Denmark) Ronnie Bremer	23	0	0	0	2	121	6th
2003	Dallara F303-Mugen Honda	(Republic of Ireland) Michael Keohane	16	0	0	0	2	42	13th
2003	Dallara F303-Mugen Honda	(Portugal) Álvaro Parente	2	0	0	0	0	7	22nd
2004	Dallara F304-Mugen Honda	(Monaco) Clivio Piccione	24	2	2	0	6	161	4th
2004	Dallara F304-Mugen Honda	(Brazil) Danilo Dirani	24	0	3	3	5	146	5th
2004	Dallara F304-Mugen Honda	(Portugal) Álvaro Parente	24	2	2	0	4	137	7th
2004	Dallara F304-Mugen Honda	(Brazil) Xandinho Negrão	2	0	0	0	0	1	19th
2005	Dallara F305-Mugen Honda	(Portugal) Álvaro Parente	18	11	9	7	15	289	**1st**
2005	Dallara F305-Mugen Honda	(United States) Charlie Kimball	22	5	6	6	13	246	**2nd**
2005	Dallara F305-Mugen Honda	(Denmark) Christian Bakkerud	22	0	0	1	4	124	7th
2005	Dallara F305-Mugen Honda	(Japan) Keiko Ihara	22	0	0	0	0	12	17th
2005	Dallara F305-Mugen Honda	(Angola) Ricardo Teixeira [B]	18	0	0	0	0	61	9th [B]
2006	Dallara F306-Mugen Honda	(United Kingdom) Oliver Jarvis	22	2	5	3	10	250	**2nd**
2006	Dallara F306-Mugen Honda	(Germany) Maro Engel	22	1	3	2	6	174	5th
2006	Dallara F306-Mugen Honda	(Denmark) Christian Bakkerud	22	1	0	3	5	129	6th
2006	Dallara F306-Mugen Honda	(Japan) Keiko Ihara	22	0	0	0	0	4	17th
2006	Dallara F304-Mugen Honda	(Angola) Ricardo Teixeira [B]	14	0	0	0	2	74	7th [B]
2006	Dallara F304-Mugen Honda	(Brazil) Mario Moraes [G]	4	0	0	0	0	3	NC [G]
2007	Dallara F307-AMG Mercedes	(Germany) Maro Engel	22	3	4	1	8	208	**2nd**
2007	Dallara F307-AMG Mercedes	(United Kingdom) Sam Bird	22	2	0	1	10	180	4th
2007	Dallara F307-AMG Mercedes	(Republic of Ireland) Niall Breen	22	1	0	0	5	145	5th
2007	Dallara F307-AMG Mercedes	(Brazil) Alberto Valério	21	0	0	1	4	114	8th
2007	Dallara F307-AMG Mercedes	(Brazil) Mario Moraes	22	0	0	0	0	42	14th
2008	Dallara F308-AMG Mercedes	(Spain) Jaime Alguersuari	22	5	6	5	12	251	**1st**
2008	Dallara F308-AMG Mercedes	(United Kingdom) Oliver Turvey	22	4	4	4	12	234	**2nd**
2008	Dallara F308-AMG Mercedes	(New Zealand) Brendon Hartley	22	5	5	4	11	208	**3rd**
2008	Dallara F308-AMG Mercedes	(Australia) Sam Abay	22	0	0	0	0	71	11th
2008	Dallara F305-Mugen Honda	(United Kingdom) Andrew Meyrick [B]	12	7	9	7	8	174	5th [B]
2008	Dallara F305-Mugen Honda	(Iceland) Kristján Einar [B]	20	0	0	0	1	101	7th [B]
2008	Dallara F305-Mugen Honda	(United Kingdom) Henry Surtees [B]	2	1	0	0	2	35	11th [B]
2008	Dallara F305-Mugen Honda	(Brazil) Adriano Buzaid [B]	2	0	0	0	1	22	13th [B]
2008	Dallara F305-Mugen Honda	(United Kingdom) Martin O'Connell [B]	2	0	0	0	0	6	15th [B]
2009	Dallara F309-Volkswagen	(Australia) Daniel Ricciardo	20	6	5	4	12	275	**1st**
2009	Dallara F309-Volkswagen	(United Kingdom) Max Chilton	20	1	4	0	5	171	4th
2009	Dallara F309-Volkswagen	(United Kingdom) Henry Arundel	20	0	0	0	1	90	9th
2009	Dallara F309-Volkswagen	(United Kingdom) Oliver Oakes	4	0	0	0	0	7	18th
2009	Dallara F309-Volkswagen	(Canada) Robert Wickens	2	0	0	0	1	12	16th
2009	Dallara F309-Volkswagen	(Canada) Philip Major	12	0	0	0	0	10	17th
2009	Dallara F309-Volkswagen	(United States) Jake Rosenzweig [G]	2	0	0	0	0	0	NC
2009	Dallara F305-Mugen Honda	(Lebanon) Joe Ghanem [B]	4	0	0	0	3	39	5th [B]
2010	Dallara F308-Volkswagen	(France) Jean-Éric Vergne	30	13	12	13	19	392	**1st**
2010	Dallara F308-Volkswagen	(United Kingdom) James Calado	29	5	2	4	13	293	**2nd**
2010	Dallara F308-Volkswagen	(Brazil) Adriano Buzaid	30	2	2	2	10	283	4th
2010	Dallara F308-Volkswagen	(United Kingdom) Rupert Svendsen-Cook	30	1	0	0	4	131	7th
2010	Dallara F308-Volkswagen	(Malaysia) Jazeman Jaafar	30	0	0	0	2	85	12th
2010	Dallara F308-Volkswagen	(Brazil) Lucas Foresti	30	0	0	0	1	45	13th
2011	Dallara F308-Volkswagen	(Brazil) Felipe Nasr	30	7	4	9	15	318	**1st**
2011	Dallara F308-Volkswagen	(Denmark) Kevin Magnussen	30	7	8	6	8	237	**2nd**
2011	Dallara F308-Volkswagen	(Colombia) Carlos Huertas	30	1	0	0	8	222	**3rd**
2011	Dallara F308-Volkswagen	(United Kingdom) Rupert Svendsen-Cook	30	2	3	1	9	191	5th
2011	Dallara F308-Volkswagen	(Malaysia) Jazeman Jaafar	30	0	0	0	4	187	6th
2011	Dallara F308-Volkswagen	(United Kingdom) Jack Harvey	30	1	0	1	4	112	9th
2012	Dallara F312-Volkswagen	(United Kingdom) Jack Harvey	28	7	10	5	12	319	**1st**
2012	Dallara F312-Volkswagen	(Malaysia) Jazeman Jaafar	28	2	0	3	14	306	**2nd**
2012	Dallara F312-Volkswagen	(United Kingdom) Harry Tincknell	28	4	0	1	8	226	5th
2012	Dallara F312-Volkswagen	(Spain) Carlos Sainz Jr.	25	4	1	2	9	224	6th
2012	Dallara F312-Volkswagen	(Brazil) Pietro Fantin	28	0	0	3	5	195	7th
2013	Dallara F312-Volkswagen	(United Kingdom) Jordan King	12	3	2	2	8	176	**1st**
2013	Dallara F312-Volkswagen	(Canada) Nicholas Latifi	11	0	2	1	1	97	5th
2013	Dallara F312-Volkswagen	(United Kingdom) Jann Mardenborough	12	0	0	0	1	85	6th
2013	Dallara F312-Volkswagen	(Malaysia) Jazeman Jaafar	3	2	2	0	3	58	9th
2013	Dallara F312-Volkswagen	(China) Zhi Cong Li	3	0	0	0	0	7	13th
2014	Dallara F312-Volkswagen	(China) Zhi Cong Li	21	0	0	0	3	118	5th
2014	Dallara F312-Volkswagen	(United Kingdom) Alice Powell	3	0	0	0	1	16	15th
2014	Dallara F312-Volkswagen	(Russia) Egor Orudzhev	3	1	0	1	1	26	12th
2014	Dallara F312-Volkswagen	(United Kingdom) Sam MacLeod	9	4	4	5	6	121	4th
2014	Dallara F312-Volkswagen	(Indonesia) Sean Gelael [G]	3	0	0	0	3	0	NC
2014	Dallara F312-Volkswagen	(United Arab Emirates) Ed Jones [G]	3	3	2	0	3	0	NC

[B] Drivers and classification in the B or National class.

[G] Guest drivers, no points awarded.

=== GP2 Series ===
GP2 Series results
Year	Car	Drivers	Races	Wins	Poles	F/Laps	Points	D.C.	T.C.
2011	Dallara GP2/11-Mecachrome	(United Kingdom) Max Chilton	18	0	0	0	4	20th	13th
2011	Dallara GP2/11-Mecachrome	(Russia) Mikhail Aleshin	6	0	0	0	0	32nd	13th
2011	Dallara GP2/11-Mecachrome	(United Kingdom) Oliver Turvey	2	0	0	0	0	25th	13th
2011	Dallara GP2/11-Mecachrome	(Portugal) Álvaro Parente	8	0	0	0	8	16th	13th
2012	Dallara GP2/11-Mecachrome	(United Kingdom) Max Chilton	24	2	2	0	169	4th	5th
2012	Dallara GP2/11-Mecachrome	(Indonesia) Rio Haryanto	24	0	1	1	38	14th	5th
2013	Dallara GP2/11-Mecachrome	(Brazil) Felipe Nasr	22	0	0	0	154	4th	**2nd**
2013	Dallara GP2/11-Mecachrome	(United Kingdom) Jolyon Palmer	22	2	1	2	119	7th	**2nd**
2014	Dallara GP2/11-Mecachrome	(Brazil) Felipe Nasr	22	4	1	2	224	**3rd**	**2nd**
2014	Dallara GP2/11-Mecachrome	(Colombia) Julián Leal	22	0	0	1	68	10th	**2nd**
2015	Dallara GP2/11-Mecachrome	(Colombia) Julián Leal	16	0	0	0	38	14th	9th
2015	Dallara GP2/11-Mecachrome	(United Kingdom) Dean Stoneman	5	0	0	0	1	24th	9th
2015	Dallara GP2/11-Mecachrome	(Denmark) Marco Sørensen	8	0	0	0	0	33rd	9th
2015	Dallara GP2/11-Mecachrome	(Venezuela) Johnny Cecotto Jr.	6	0	0	0	0	28th	9th
2015	Dallara GP2/11-Mecachrome	(Indonesia) Sean Gelael	8	0	0	0	0	30th	9th
2015	Dallara GP2/11-Mecachrome	(United Kingdom) Jann Mardenborough	2	0	0	0	0	35th	9th
2016	Dallara GP2/11-Mecachrome	(Austria) René Binder	4	0	0	0	0	23rd†	10th
2016	Dallara GP2/11-Mecachrome	(Spain) Sergio Canamasas	18	0	0	0	17	19th	10th
2016	Dallara GP2/11-Mecachrome	(Germany) Marvin Kirchhöfer	20	0	0	0	21	17th	10th
2016	Dallara GP2/11-Mecachrome	(Switzerland) Louis Delétraz	2	0	0	0	0	26th	10th

† — Includes points scored for ART Grand Prix

=== In detail ===
(key) (Races in bold indicate pole position) (Races in italics indicate fastest lap)

Year	Chassis Engine Tyres	Drivers	1	2	3	4	5	6	7	8	9	10	11	12	13	14	15	16	17	18	19	20	21	22	23	24	T.C.	Points
2011	GP2/11; Mecachrome; **P**		IST; FEA	IST; SPR	CAT; FEA	CAT; SPR	MON; FEA	MON; SPR	VAL; FEA	VAL; SPR	SIL; FEA	SIL; SPR	NÜR; FEA	NÜR; SPR	HUN; FEA	HUN; SPR	SPA; FEA	SPA; SPR	MNZ; FEA	MNZ; SPR							13th	4
2011	GP2/11; Mecachrome; **P**	(United Kingdom) Max Chilton	Ret	17	12	11	7	6	Ret	Ret	Ret	19	17	6	18	Ret	15	16	Ret	18							13th	4
2011	GP2/11; Mecachrome; **P**	(Russia) Mikhail Aleshin	DNS	DNS	16	18									15	15	Ret	Ret									13th	4
2011	GP2/11; Mecachrome; **P**	(United Kingdom) Oliver Turvey					14	8																			13th	4
2011	GP2/11; Mecachrome; **P**	(Portugal) Álvaro Parente							Ret	18	9	9	20^{†}	Ret					12	12							13th	4
2012	GP2/11; Mecachrome; **P**		SEP; FEA	SEP; SPR	BHR1; FEA	BHR1; SPR	BHR2; FEA	BHR2; SPR	CAT; FEA	CAT; SPR	MON; FEA	MON; SPR	VAL; FEA	VAL; SPR	SIL; FEA	SIL; SPR	HOC; FEA	HOC; SPR	HUN; FEA	HUN; SPR	SPA; FEA	SPA; SPR	MNZ; FEA	MNZ; SPR	MRN; FEA	MRN; SPR	5th	207
2012	GP2/11; Mecachrome; **P**	(United Kingdom) Max Chilton	3	7	4	5	5	13	7	5	5	2	7	4	9	19^{†}	14	Ret	**1**	11	12	22	**4**	6	1	19	5th	207
2012	GP2/11; Mecachrome; **P**	(Indonesia) Rio Haryanto	12	10	9	15	6	6	16	15	14	11	5	Ret	10	12	17	11	12	7	**10**	7	19	12	9	11	5th	207
2013	GP2/11; Mecachrome; **P**		SEP; FEA	SEP; SPR	BHR; FEA	BHR; SPR	CAT; FEA	CAT; SPR	MON; FEA	MON; SPR	SIL; FEA	SIL; SPR	NÜR; FEA	NÜR; SPR	HUN; FEA	HUN; SPR	SPA; FEA	SPA; SPR	MNZ; FEA	MNZ; SPR	MRN; FEA	MRN; SPR	YMC; FEA	YMC; SPR			2nd	273
2013	GP2/11; Mecachrome; **P**	(Brazil) Felipe Nasr	4	2	4	2	2	3	4	4	Ret	7	9	4	3	5	Ret	8	Ret	12	2	16	7	18			2nd	273
2013	GP2/11; Mecachrome; **P**	(United Kingdom) Jolyon Palmer	6	9	5	6	10	4	Ret	12	6	Ret	24	11	1	12	15	6	Ret	10	**1**	17	2	Ret			2nd	273
2014	GP2/11; Mecachrome; **P**		BHR; FEA	BHR; SPR	CAT; FEA	CAT; SPR	MON; FEA	MON; SPR	RBR; FEA	RBR; SPR	SIL; FEA	SIL; SPR	HOC; FEA	HOC; SPR	HUN; FEA	HUN; SPR	SPA; FEA	SPA; SPR	MNZ; FEA	MNZ; SPR	SOC; FEA	SOC; SPR	YMC; FEA	YMC; SPR			2nd	292
2014	GP2/11; Mecachrome; **P**	(Brazil) Felipe Nasr	8	4	3	1	3	Ret	1	Ret	7	1	5	2	**6**	3	4	1	6	6	17	3	4	2			2nd	292
2014	GP2/11; Mecachrome; **P**	(Colombia) Julián Leal	2	3	4	5	Ret	16	13	7	5	5	16	18	Ret	15	13	10	13	17	9	17	12	11			2nd	292
2015	GP2/11; Mecachrome; **P**		BHR; FEA	BHR; SPR	CAT; FEA	CAT; SPR	MON; FEA	MON; SPR	RBR; FEA	RBR; SPR	SIL; FEA	SIL; SPR	HUN; FEA	HUN; SPR	SPA; FEA	SPA; SPR	MNZ; FEA	MNZ; SPR	SOC; FEA	SOC; SPR	BHR; FEA	BHR; SPR	YMC; FEA	YMC; SPR			9th	39
2015	GP2/11; Mecachrome; **P**	(Colombia) Julián Leal	8	5	Ret	16	6	5	14	22	9	12	16	15	4	11	12	9									9th	39
2015	GP2/11; Mecachrome; **P**	(United Kingdom) Dean Stoneman																	9	16	21	12	Ret	C			9th	39
2015	GP2/11; Mecachrome; **P**	(Denmark) Marco Sørensen	Ret	21	19	22	Ret	20	18	16																	9th	39
2015	GP2/11; Mecachrome; **P**	(Venezuela) Johnny Cecotto Jr.									13	25															9th	39
2015	GP2/11; Mecachrome; **P**	(Indonesia) Sean Gelael											18	20	20	21			19	20	23	15	Ret	C			9th	39
2015	GP2/11; Mecachrome; **P**	(United Kingdom) Jann Mardenborough															19	20									9th	39
2016	GP2/11; Mecachrome; **P**		CAT; FEA	CAT; SPR	MON; FEA	MON; SPR	BAK; FEA	BAK; SPR	RBR; FEA	RBR; SPR	SIL; FEA	SIL; SPR	HUN; FEA	HUN; SPR	HOC; FEA	HOC; SPR	SPA; FEA	SPA; SPR	MNZ; FEA	MNZ; SPR	SEP; FEA	SEP; SPR	YMC; FEA	YMC; SPR			10th	38
2016	GP2/11; Mecachrome; **P**	(Spain) Sergio Canamasas	5	9	12	10	Ret	6	Ret	10	13	9	18	9			12	7	Ret	13	10	15	12	16			10th	38
2016	GP2/11; Mecachrome; **P**	(Austria) René Binder													13	15											10th	38
2016	GP2/11; Mecachrome; **P**	(Germany) Marvin Kirchhöfer	15	15	7	2	Ret	10	Ret	19	12	8	14	13	10	14	Ret	14	18	8	15	11					10th	38
2016	GP2/11; Mecachrome; **P**	(Switzerland) Louis Delétraz																					Ret	17			10th	38

=== GP2 Final ===
(key) (Races in bold indicate pole position) (Races in italics indicate fastest lap)

Year	Chassis Engine Tyres	Drivers	1	2	T.C.	Points
2011	GP2/11; Mecachrome; **P**		YMC; FEA	YMC; SPR	12th	0
2011	GP2/11; Mecachrome; **P**	(United Kingdom) Max Chilton	Ret	16	12th	0
2011	GP2/11; Mecachrome; **P**	(Czech Republic) Jan Charouz	Ret	17	12th	0

=== Formula Nissan/Renault 3.5 Series ===
Formula Nissan/Renault 3.5 Series results
Year	Car	Drivers	Races	Wins	Poles	F/Laps	Podiums	Points	D.C.	T.C.
2003	Dallara SN01-Nissan VQ	(India) Narain Karthikeyan	18	0	0	0	4	121	4th	4th
2003	Dallara SN01-Nissan VQ	(France) Bruce Jouanny	18	0	2	0	2	62	10th	4th
2004	Dallara SN01-Nissan VQ	(Portugal) Tiago Monteiro	18	5	4	2	9	154	**2nd**	**2nd**
2004	Dallara SN01-Nissan VQ	(France) Olivier Pla	18	1	0	0	2	66	9th	**2nd**
2005	Dallara T05-Renault	(Austria) Andreas Zuber	16	1	1	4	4	73	6th	4th
2005	Dallara T05-Renault	(Australia) Will Power	13	2	3	0	4	64	7th	4th
2005	Dallara T05-Renault	(Switzerland) Giorgio Mondini	2	0	0	0	0	0	24th†	4th
2006	Dallara T05-Renault	(Russia) Mikhail Aleshin	17	0	1	0	2	41	11th	4th
2006	Dallara T05-Renault	(South Africa) Adrian Zaugg	6	0	1	0	2	33	13th	4th
2006	Dallara T05-Renault	(Germany) Sebastian Vettel	3	2	1	0	2	28	15th	4th
2006	Dallara T05-Renault	(United States) Colin Fleming	4	0	0	0	0	19	18th	4th
2006	Dallara T05-Renault	(South Africa) Gavin Cronje	2	0	0	0	0	0	33rd	4th
2007	Dallara T05-Renault	(Germany) Sebastian Vettel	7	1	1	1	4	74	5th	**3rd**
2007	Dallara T05-Renault	(Russia) Mikhail Aleshin	17	1	1	0	1	44	12th	**3rd**
2007	Dallara T05-Renault	(Germany) Michael Ammermüller	5	0	1	0	0	12	22nd	**3rd**
2007	Dallara T05-Renault	(Canada) Robert Wickens	4	0	0	0	0	6	25th	**3rd**
2008	Dallara T08-Renault	(Russia) Mikhail Aleshin	16	0	0	0	3	73	5th	5th
2008	Dallara T08-Renault	(Canada) Robert Wickens	17	1	1	3	4	55	12th	5th
2009	Dallara T08-Renault	(United Kingdom) Oliver Turvey	17	1	2	0	5	93	4th	**2nd**
2009	Dallara T08-Renault	(Spain) Jaime Alguersuari	17	1	1	1	3	88	6th	**2nd**
2010	Dallara T08-Renault	(Russia) Mikhail Aleshin	17	3	1	2	8	138	**1st**	**3rd**
2010	Dallara T08-Renault	(United States) Jake Rosenzweig	16	0	1	0	0	13	19th	**3rd**
2011	Dallara T08-Renault	(Canada) Robert Wickens	17	5	7	4	10	241	**1st**	**1st**
2011	Dallara T08-Renault	(France) Jean-Éric Vergne	17	5	4	1	9	232	**2nd**	**1st**
2012	Dallara T12-Zytek	(Denmark) Kevin Magnussen	17	1	3	0	3	106	7th	5th
2012	Dallara T12-Zytek	(United Kingdom) Will Stevens	17	0	0	0	1	59	12th	5th
2013	Dallara T12-Zytek	(Colombia) Carlos Huertas	17	1	0	1	1	30	14th	11th
2013	Dallara T12-Zytek	(Malaysia) Jazeman Jaafar	15	0	0	0	1	24	17th	11th
2015	Dallara T12-Zytek	(Indonesia) Sean Gelael	9	0	0	0	0	4	18th	4th
2015	Dallara T12-Zytek	(France) Tom Dillmann	9	0	0	0	1	69	6th	4th

†Includes points scored with EuroInternational.

=== FIA Formula E ===
FIA Formula E Championship results
Year	Team	Chassis	Tyres	No.	Drivers	1	2	3	4	5	6	7	8	9	10	11	D.C.		T.C.	
2014–15	Mahindra Racing	Spark-Renault SRT 01E	**M**			BEI	PUT	PDE	BNA	MIA	LBH	MON	BER	MSC	LON	LON	Points	Position	Points	Position
2014–15	Mahindra Racing	Spark-Renault SRT 01E	**M**	5	(India) Karun Chandhok	5	6	13	Ret	14	12	13	18	12	12	13	18	17th	58	8th
2014–15	Mahindra Racing	Spark-Renault SRT 01E	**M**	21	(Brazil) Bruno Senna	Ret‡	14‡	6	5‡	Ret‡	5	Ret	17	16	16	4	40	10th	58	8th

‡ FanBoost in Formula E.

† These drivers also drove for other teams during the season and their final positions include all team results.

D.C. = Drivers' Championship position, T.C. = Teams' Championship position, NC = Not Classified.

=== GP3 Series ===
GP3 Series results
Year	Car	Drivers	Races	Wins	Poles	F/Laps	Podiums	Points	D.C.	T.C.
2010	Dallara GP3/10-Renault	(United Kingdom) Dean Smith	16	0	0	0	1	24	7th	5th
2010	Dallara GP3/10-Renault	(United States) Josef Newgarden	16	0	1	0	0	8	18th	5th
2010	Dallara GP3/10-Renault	(Brazil) Lucas Foresti	10	0	0	0	1	7	19th	5th
2010	Dallara GP3/10-Renault	(Russia) Mikhail Aleshin	2	0	0	0	0	0	37th	5th
2010	Dallara GP3/10-Renault	(Portugal) António Félix da Costa	4	0	0	0	0	3	26th	5th
2011	Dallara GP3/10-Renault	(France) Tom Dillmann	2	0	1	0	1	15	14th†	9th
2011	Dallara GP3/10-Renault	(United States) Conor Daly	16	0	0	0	0	10	17th	9th
2011	Dallara GP3/10-Renault	(Brazil) Leonardo Cordeiro	16	0	0	0	0	0	30th	9th
2011	Dallara GP3/10-Renault	(Canada) Daniel Morad	4	0	0	0	0	0	33rd	9th
2012	Dallara GP3/10-Renault	(Portugal) António Félix da Costa	16	3	1	6	6	132	**3rd**	**3rd**
2012	Dallara GP3/10-Renault	(United Kingdom) William Buller	16	1	0	0	1	20	15th	**3rd**
2012	Dallara GP3/10-Renault	(United Kingdom) Alex Brundle	16	0	0	0	1	19	16th	**3rd**
2013	Dallara GP3/13-AER	(United Kingdom) Nick Yelloly	16	0	0	1	4	107	6th	4th
2013	Dallara GP3/13-AER	(United Kingdom) Alexander Sims	6	1	0	1	3	77	8th†	4th
2013	Dallara GP3/13-AER	(Argentina) Eric Lichtenstein	10	0	0	0	0	0	22nd	4th
2013	Dallara GP3/13-AER	(Macau) Luís Sá Silva	16	0	0	0	0	0	23rd	4th
2014	Dallara GP3/13-AER	(United Kingdom) Alex Lynn	18	3	2	3	8	207	**1st**	**1st**
2014	Dallara GP3/13-AER	(United Kingdom) Emil Bernstorff	18	1	0	1	5	134	5th	**1st**
2014	Dallara GP3/13-AER	(Macau) Luís Sá Silva	18	0	0	0	0	6	19th	**1st**
2015	Dallara GP3/13-AER	(Italy) Antonio Fuoco	18	0	0	0	2	88	6th	5th
2015	Dallara GP3/13-AER	(United Kingdom) Jann Mardenborough	14	0	0	0	2	58	9th	5th
2015	Dallara GP3/13-AER	(Hong Kong) Adderly Fong	2	0	0	0	0	0	23rd	5th
2015	Dallara GP3/13-AER	(Australia) Mitchell Gilbert	18	0	0	0	0	1	22nd	5th

=== In detail ===
(key) (Races in bold indicate pole position) (Races in italics indicate fastest lap)

Year	Chassis Engine Tyres	Drivers	1	2	3	4	5	6	7	8	9	10	11	12	13	14	15	16	17	18	T.C.	Points
2010	GP3/10; Renault; **P**		CAT; FEA	CAT; SPR	IST; FEA	IST; SPR	VAL; FEA	VAL; SPR	SIL; FEA	SIL; SPR	HOC; FEA	HOC; SPR	HUN; FEA	HUN; SPR	SPA; FEA	SPA; SPR	MNZ; FEA	MNZ; SPR			5th	42
2010	GP3/10; Renault; **P**	(United States) Josef Newgarden	Ret	16	10	23	Ret	26	16	10	**18**^{†}	19	7	Ret	Ret	21	7	5			5th	42
2010	GP3/10; Renault; **P**	(United Kingdom) Dean Smith	4	5	22^{†}	10	17	23	6	22	9	12	5	3	6	4	Ret	16			5th	42
2010	GP3/10; Renault; **P**	(Brazil) Lucas Foresti	7	2			21	28	18	16	Ret	14					20	Ret			5th	42
2010	GP3/10; Renault; **P**	(Russia) Mikhail Aleshin			Ret	22															5th	42
2010	GP3/10; Renault; **P**	(Portugal) António Félix da Costa											6	17	Ret	12					5th	42
2011	GP3/10; Renault; **P**		IST; FEA	IST; SPR	CAT; FEA	CAT; SPR	VAL; FEA	VAL; SPR	SIL; FEA	SIL; SPR	NÜR; FEA	NÜR; SPR	HUN; FEA	HUN; SPR	SPA; FEA	SPA; SPR	MNZ; FEA	MNZ; SPR			9th	21
2011	GP3/10; Renault; **P**	(United States) Conor Daly	21	25	21	22	12	7	13	7	6	8	13	11	5	7	6	Ret			9th	21
2011	GP3/10; Renault; **P**	(France) Tom Dillmann	**3**	9																	9th	21
2011	GP3/10; Renault; **P**	(Canada) Daniel Morad			24	14	15	Ret	DNS	DNS											9th	21
2011	GP3/10; Renault; **P**	(United Kingdom) Callum MacLeod									29	21	26	18	Ret	Ret	11	5			9th	21
2011	GP3/10; Renault; **P**	(Brazil) Leonardo Cordeiro	Ret	22	23	15	10	17	17	23	17	19	20	15	21	18	13	Ret			9th	21
2012	GP3/10; Renault; **P**		CAT; FEA	CAT; SPR	MON; FEA	MON; SPR	VAL; FEA	VAL; SPR	SIL; FEA	SIL; SPR	HOC; FEA	HOC; SPR	HUN; FEA	HUN; SPR	SPA; FEA	SPA; SPR	MNZ; FEA	MNZ; SPR			3rd	171
2012	GP3/10; Renault; **P**	(United Kingdom) Alex Brundle	10	8	10	Ret	16	14	7	10	DSQ	13	15	3	19	11	DSQ	10			3rd	171
2012	GP3/10; Renault; **P**	(Portugal) António Félix da Costa	**14**	7	7	2	Ret	8	1	6	Ret	Ret	1	1	2	2	15	5			3rd	171
2012	GP3/10; Renault; **P**	(United Kingdom) William Buller	23	9	12	Ret	10	9	Ret	1	9	Ret	23	12	13	8	10	12			3rd	171
2013	GP3/13; AER; **P**		CAT; FEA	CAT; SPR	VAL; FEA	VAL; SPR	SIL; FEA	SIL; SPR	NÜR; FEA	NÜR; SPR	HUN; FEA	HUN; SPR	SPA; FEA	SPA; SPR	MNZ; FEA	MNZ; SPR	YMC; FEA	YMC; SPR			4th	168
2013	GP3/13; AER; **P**	(Macau) Luís Sá Silva	13	12	Ret	22	17	12	Ret	22	Ret	22	12	21^{†}	Ret	19	18	17			4th	168
2013	GP3/13; AER; **P**	(United Kingdom) Nick Yelloly	4	Ret	12	9	6	2	5	3	15	13	6	4	2	Ret	3	6			4th	168
2013	GP3/13; AER; **P**	(Argentina) Eric Lichtenstein	18	10	Ret	Ret	14	10	Ret	21	18	16									4th	168
2013	GP3/13; AER; **P**	(United Kingdom) Alexander Sims											5	1	5	6	2	7			4th	168
2014	GP3/13; AER; **P**		CAT; FEA	CAT; SPR	RBR; FEA	RBR; SPR	SIL; FEA	SIL; SPR	HOC; FEA	HOC; SPR	HUN; FEA	HUN; SPR	SPA; FEA	SPA; SPR	MNZ; FEA	MNZ; SPR	SOC; FEA	SOC; SPR	YMC; FEA	YMC; SPR	1st	347
2014	GP3/13; AER; **P**	(United Kingdom) Alex Lynn	**1**	18	**1**	20	2	6	2	3	4	4	8	1	6	2	7	5	5	2	1st	347
2014	GP3/13; AER; **P**	(United Kingdom) Emil Bernstorff	Ret	8	2	1	4	3	3	Ret	5	7	9	6	4	4	Ret	8	4	3	1st	347
2014	GP3/13; AER; **P**	(Macau) Luís Sá Silva	16	10	8	22	18	9	17	10	17	18	16	23^{†}	14	7	17	15	Ret	17	1st	347
2015	GP3/13; AER; **P**		CAT; FEA	CAT; SPR	RBR; FEA	RBR; SPR	SIL; FEA	SIL; SPR	HUN; FEA	HUN; SPR	SPA; FEA	SPA; SPR	MNZ; FEA	MNZ; SPR	SOC; FEA	SOC; SPR	BHR; FEA	BHR; SPR	YMC; FEA	YMC; SPR	5th	147
2015	GP3/13; AER; **P**	(Italy) Antonio Fuoco	8	4	2	Ret	18	23	8	Ret	4	Ret	Ret	11	6	4	9	5	7	2	5th	147
2015	GP3/13; AER; **P**	(United Kingdom) Jann Mardenborough	4	3	5	13	17	15	Ret	17	Ret	12			5	3	7	Ret			5th	147
2015	GP3/13; AER; **P**	(Hong Kong) Adderly Fong																	Ret	22	5th	147
2015	GP3/13; AER; **P**	(Australia) Mitchell Gilbert	22^{†}	22	Ret	11	20	21	11	10	11	11	10	9	12	15	15	11	14	17	5th	147

=== A1 Grand Prix Series ===
A1 Grand Prix Results
Year	Car	Team	Wins	Poles	F/Laps	Points	T.C.
2005–06	Lola A1GP-Zytek	A1 Team Portugal	0	0	0	66	9th
2005–06	Lola A1GP-Zytek	A1 Team Japan	0	0	0	8	21st
2005–06	Lola A1GP-Zytek	A1 Team Lebanon	0	0	0	0	23rd
2006–07	Lola A1GP-Zytek	A1 Team Lebanon	0	0	0	0	23rd
2007–08	Lola A1GP-Zytek	A1 Team Lebanon	0	0	0	0	20th
2008–09	A1GP-Ferrari	(South Korea) A1 Team Korea	0	0	0	4	19th

=== Eurocup Formula Renault 2.0 ===
Eurocup Formula Renault 2.0 results
Year	Car	Drivers	Races	Wins	Poles	F/Laps	Podiums	Points	D.C.	T.C.
2007	Tatuus-Renault	(United Kingdom) Alexander Khateeb	4	0	0	0	0	0	44th	NC
2007	Tatuus-Renault	(Lebanon) Khalil Beschir	2	0	0	0	0	0	48th	NC
2007	Tatuus-Renault	(South Africa) Jimmy Auby	2	0	0	0	0	0	49th	NC
2007	Tatuus-Renault	(Lebanon) Joe Ghanem	8	0	0	0	0	0	42nd	NC

=== Porsche Supercup ===
Porsche Supercup results
Year	Car	Drivers	Races	Wins	Poles	Podiums	Points	D.C.	T.C.
2001	Porsche 996 GT3 Cup	(Germany) Sascha Maassen	10	1	1	4	125	5th	**3rd**
2001	Porsche 996 GT3 Cup	(Australia) Alex Davison	1	0	0	0	0	NC	**3rd**
2001	Porsche 996 GT3 Cup	(Italy) Giovanni Anapoli	4	0	0	0	0	NC	**3rd**
2001	Porsche 996 GT3 Cup	(Belgium) Vincent Radermecker	9	0	0	0	34	13th	**3rd**

=== Formula 3 Euro Series ===
Formula 3 Euro Series results
Year	Car	Drivers	Races	Wins	Poles	F/Laps	Podiums	Points	D.C.	T.C.
2008	Dallara F308-Mercedes	(France) Richard Philippe	20	0	0	0	0	0	28th	9th
2008	Dallara F308-Mercedes	(Venezuela) Rodolfo González	18	0	0	0	0	0.5	24th	9th
2008	Dallara F308-Mercedes	(New Zealand) Brendon Hartley	8	0	0	0	0	0	NC	9th
2008	Dallara F308-Mercedes	(United Kingdom) Oliver Oakes	2	0	0	0	0	0	NC	9th
2009	Dallara F308-Mercedes	(New Zealand) Brendon Hartley	16	1	0	0	1	15	11th	8th
2009	Dallara F308-Mercedes	(United States) Jake Rosenzweig	20	0	0	0	1	6	18th	8th
2009	Dallara F308-Mercedes	(Italy) Mirko Bortolotti	2	0	0	0	0	0	NC	8th
2011	Dallara F308-Volkswagen	(Malaysia) Jazeman Jaafar	3	0	0	0	0	0	NC	NC
2011	Dallara F308-Volkswagen	(France) Tom Dillmann	3	0	0	0	0	0	NC	NC
2011	Dallara F308-Volkswagen	(Colombia) Carlos Huertas	3	0	0	0	0	0	NC	NC
2012†	Dallara F312-Volkswagen	(United Kingdom) William Buller	24	2	1	1	9	182.5	5th	**3rd**
2012†	Dallara F312-Volkswagen	(Spain) Carlos Sainz Jr.	24	0	2	1	2	112	9th	**3rd**
2012†	Dallara F312-Volkswagen	(United Kingdom) Harry Tincknell	6	0	0	0	0	0	NC	**3rd**
2012†	Dallara F312-Volkswagen	(Malaysia) Jazeman Jaafar	12	0	0	0	0	0	NC	**3rd**
2012†	Dallara F312-Volkswagen	(United Kingdom) Jack Harvey	3	0	0	0	0	0	NC	**3rd**
2012†	Dallara F312-Volkswagen	(Brazil) Pietro Fantin	3	0	0	0	0	0	NC	**3rd**
2012†	Dallara F312-Volkswagen	(Brazil) Felipe Nasr	3	0	0	0	0	0	NC	**3rd**

† The 2012 Formula 3 Euro Series was run in partnership with the 2012 European Formula 3 Championship, with eight of the ten European F3 rounds counting towards the F3 Euro Series point tallies.

=== FIA European Formula 3 Championship ===
==== As Carlin ====
European Formula 3 Championship results
Year	Car	Drivers	Races	Wins	Poles	F/Laps	Podiums	Points	D.C.	T.C.
2012	Dallara F312-Volkswagen	(United Kingdom) William Buller	16	0	1	0	5	137	6th	NA
2012	Dallara F312-Volkswagen	(Spain) Carlos Sainz Jr.	20	1	2	2	3	161	5th	NA
2012	Dallara F312-Volkswagen	(United Kingdom) Harry Tincknell	8	0	0	0	0	0	NC	NA
2012	Dallara F312-Volkswagen	(Malaysia) Jazeman Jaafar	12	0	0	0	4	0	NC	NA
2012	Dallara F312-Volkswagen	(United Kingdom) Jack Harvey	6	0	0	0	0	0	NC	NA
2012	Dallara F312-Volkswagen	(Brazil) Pietro Fantin	6	0	0	0	0	0	NC	NA
2012	Dallara F312-Volkswagen	(Brazil) Felipe Nasr	2	0	0	0	0	0	NC	NA
2012	Dallara F312-Volkswagen	(United Kingdom) Richard Bradley	2	0	0	0	0	0	NC	NA
2013	Dallara F312-Volkswagen	(United Kingdom) Harry Tincknell	30	1	2	0	2	227	5th	**3rd**
2013	Dallara F312-Volkswagen	(United Kingdom) Jordan King	30	0	0	0	4	176	6th	**3rd**
2013	Dallara F312-Volkswagen	(Canada) Nicholas Latifi	30	0	0	0	0	45	15th	**3rd**
2013	Dallara F312-Volkswagen	(United Kingdom) Jann Mardenborough	30	0	0	0	0	12	21st	**3rd**
2013	Dallara F312-Volkswagen	(Russia) Daniil Kvyat [G]	21	1	5	1	7	0	NC	**3rd**
2013	Dallara F312-Volkswagen	(New Zealand) Nick Cassidy [G]	6	0	0	0	0	0	NC	**3rd**
2014	Dallara F312-Volkswagen	(United Kingdom) Jordan King	33	0	0	0	6	217	7th	5th
2014	Dallara F312-Volkswagen	(United Arab Emirates) Ed Jones	21	0	0	0	2	70	13th	5th
2014	Dallara F312-Volkswagen	(United Kingdom) Jake Dennis	33	0	0	0	3	174	9th	5th
2015	Dallara F312-Volkswagen	(United Kingdom) Callum Ilott	24	0	0	0	1	65.5	12th	4th
2015	Dallara F312-Volkswagen	(United Kingdom) George Russell	24	1	0	0	3	203	6th	4th
2015	Dallara F312-Volkswagen	(Colombia) Tatiana Calderón	24	0	0	0	0	0	27th	4th
2016	Dallara F312-Volkswagen	(China) Zhi Cong Li	10	0	0	0	0	0	23rd	6th
2016	Dallara F312-Volkswagen	(Italy) Alessio Lorandi	21	1	1	1	2	96	14th	6th
2016	Dallara F312-Volkswagen	(United States) Ryan Tveter	18	0	0	0	0	25	17th	6th
2016	Dallara F312-Volkswagen	(South Africa) Raoul Hyman	3	0	0	0	0	1	22nd	6th
2016	Dallara F312-Volkswagen	(Malaysia) Weiron Tan	9	0	0	0	0	0	25th	6th
2016	Dallara F312-Volkswagen	(United Kingdom) William Buller	3	0	0	0	0	0	24th	6th
2016	Dallara F312-Volkswagen	(United Kingdom) Jake Hughes	3	0	0	0	1	27	16th	6th
2016	Dallara F312-Volkswagen	(United Kingdom) Lando Norris [G]	3	0	0	0	0	0	NC	6th
2016	Dallara F312-Volkswagen	(United Kingdom) Dan Ticktum [G]	3	0	0	0	0	0	NC	6th
2017	Dallara F312-Volkswagen	(United Kingdom) Jake Dennis	9	0	0	0	1	41	17th	**2nd**
2017	Dallara F312-Volkswagen	(Canada) Devlin DeFrancesco	6	0	0	0	0	0	NC	**2nd**
2017	Dallara F312-Volkswagen	(India) Jehan Daruvala	30	1	1	0	3	191	6th	**2nd**
2017	Dallara F312-Volkswagen	(Austria) Ferdinand Habsburg	30	1	0	2	4	187	7th	**2nd**
2017	Dallara F312-Volkswagen	(United Kingdom) Lando Norris	30	9	8	8	20	441	**1st**	**2nd**
2017	Dallara F312-Volkswagen	(France) Sacha Fenestraz	3	0	0	0	0	1	20th	**2nd**
2018	Dallara F312-Volkswagen	(India) Jehan Daruvala	30	1	1	1	5	136.5	10th	4th
2018	Dallara F312-Volkswagen	(France) Sacha Fenestraz	30	1	2	1	3	121	11th	4th
2018	Dallara F312-Volkswagen	(Russia) Nikita Troitskiy	30	1	0	2	1	37	15th	4th
2018	Dallara F312-Volkswagen	(Canada) Devlin DeFrancesco	6	0	0	0	0	0	25th	4th
2018	Dallara F312-Volkswagen	(India) Ameya Vaidyanathan	29	0	0	0	0	0	23rd	4th
2018	Dallara F312-Volkswagen	(Austria) Ferdinand Habsburg	30	0	0	2	1	87	13th	4th

==== As Jagonya Ayam with Carlin ====
European Formula 3 Championship results
Year	Car	Drivers	Races	Wins	Poles	F/Laps	Podiums	Points	D.C.	T.C.
2014	Dallara F312-Volkswagen	(Italy) Antonio Giovinazzi	33	2	2	3	7	238	6th	2nd
2014	Dallara F312-Volkswagen	(Indonesia) Sean Gelael	33	0	0	0	0	25	18th	2nd
2014	Dallara F312-Volkswagen	(United Kingdom) Tom Blomqvist	33	6	6	8	14	420	**2nd**	2nd
2015	Dallara F312-Volkswagen	(Italy) Antonio Giovinazzi	24	6	4	4	20	412.5	**2nd**	2nd
2015	Dallara F312-Volkswagen	(United States) Gustavo Menezes	24	0	0	1	0	65	13th	2nd
2015	Dallara F312-Volkswagen	(United States) Ryan Tveter	24	0	0	0	0	2	23rd	2nd

In 2014 and 2015, Carlin competed with two teams in European F3, under the names of Carlin and Jagonya Ayam with Carlin.

=== IndyCar Series ===
(key)

Year	Chassis	Engine	Drivers	No.	1	2	3	4	5	6	7	8	9	10	11	12	13	14	15	16	17	Pos.	Pts.
2018					STP	PHX	LBH	ALA	IMS	INDY	DET		TXS	ROA	IOW	TOR	MOH	POC	GAT	POR	SNM		
2018	Dallara DW12	Chevrolet IndyCar V6t	(United States) Charlie Kimball	23	20	17	10	23	20	18	19	8	10	18	14	5	16	9	19	7	22	17th	287
2018	Dallara DW12	Chevrolet IndyCar V6t	(United Kingdom) Max Chilton	59	19	18	17	22	16	22	20	11	12	17	15	23	24	13	17	18	21	19th	223
2019					STP	COA	ALA	LBH	IMS	INDY	DET		TXS	ROA	TOR	IOW	MOH	POC	GAT	POR	LAG		
2019	Dallara DW12	Chevrolet IndyCar V6t	(United States) Charlie Kimball	23	17					25			21					10	15	10	15	25th	117
2019	Dallara DW12	Chevrolet IndyCar V6t	(Mexico) Patricio O'Ward **(R)**	31		8	16	12	19	DNQ	14	11		17								26th	115
2019	Dallara DW12	Chevrolet IndyCar V6t	(United States) Sage Karam	31											21	22						27th	39
2019	Dallara DW12	Chevrolet IndyCar V6t	(United States) RC Enerson **(R)**	31													17					35th	13
2019	Dallara DW12	Chevrolet IndyCar V6t	(United Kingdom) Max Chilton	59	16	21	22	14	18	DNQ	17	15		16	14		16			11	13	22nd	184
2019	Dallara DW12	Chevrolet IndyCar V6t	(United States) Conor Daly	59									11			13		11	6			24th	149
2020					TXS	IMS	ROA		IOW		INDY	GAT		MOH		IMS		STP					
2020	Dallara DW12	Chevrolet IndyCar V6t	(United States) Conor Daly	59	6				**8**	13		10	8									17th	237
2020	Dallara DW12	Chevrolet IndyCar V6t	(United Kingdom) Max Chilton	59		16	17	15			17			16	13	11	19	12				22nd	147
2021					ALA	STP	TXS		IMS	INDY	DET		ROA	MOH	NSH	IMS	GAT	POR	LAG	LBH			
2021	Dallara DW12	Chevrolet IndyCar V6t	(United Kingdom) Max Chilton	59	20	24			Wth	24	22	22	10	18	18	20		19	21	15		25th	134
2021	Dallara DW12	Chevrolet IndyCar V6t	(United States) Conor Daly	59			21	24									11					18th	235

=== Euroformula Open Championship ===
Euroformula Open Championship results
Year	Car	Driver	Races	Wins	Poles	F/Laps	Podiums	Points	D.C.	T.C.
2016	Dallara F312-Toyota	(Germany) Keyvan Andres Soori	16	0	0	0	0	42	12th	4th
2016	Dallara F312-Toyota	(United States) Colton Herta	16	4	5	4	7	199	**3rd**	4th
2016	Dallara F312-Toyota	(India) Ameya Vaidyanathan	16	0	0	0	0	26	15th	4th
2017	Dallara F312-Toyota	(India) Tarun Reddy	16	0	0	0	0	22	13th	**2nd**
2017	Dallara F312-Toyota	(Canada) Devlin DeFrancesco	16	0	0	0	2	57	6th	**2nd**
2017	Dallara F312-Toyota	(India) Ameya Vaidyanathan	16	1	0	1	3	94	**3rd**	**2nd**
2018	Dallara F312-Toyota	(United States) Cameron Das	16	0	0	1	4	159	5th	**2nd**
2018	Dallara F312-Toyota	(Brazil) Matheus Iorio	16	0	0	0	5	178	4th	**2nd**
2018	Dallara F312-Toyota	(United States) Dev Gore	8	0	0	0	0	11	17th	**2nd**
2019	Dallara F317-Volkswagen	(Japan) Teppei Natori	14	1	2	1	3	115	6th	**2nd**
2019	Dallara F317-Volkswagen	(Brazil) Christian Hahn	18	0	0	0	0	84	10th	**2nd**
2019	Dallara F317-Volkswagen	(United Kingdom) Billy Monger	18	1	1	0	2	89	9th	**2nd**
2019	Dallara F317-Volkswagen	(Denmark) Nicolai Kjærgaard	18	0	0	1	5	111	7th	**2nd**
2019	Dallara F317-Volkswagen	(Japan) Nobuharu Matsushita	2	0	1	1	1	20	18th	**2nd**
2019	Dallara F317-Volkswagen	(Israel) Ido Cohen	4	0	0	0	0	N/A	N/A	**2nd**
2020	Dallara 320-Volkswagen	(Israel) Ido Cohen	18	0	0	0	2	114	7th	4th
2020	Dallara 320-Volkswagen	(Barbados) Zane Maloney	18	0	0	0	2	113	8th	4th
2020	Dallara 320-Volkswagen	(United Kingdom) Ben Barnicoat	2	1	1	0	2	41	13th	4th
2021	Dallara 320-Volkswagen	(Italy) Enzo Trulli †	21	0	0	1	3	144	7th	4th
2021	Dallara 320-Volkswagen	(Australia) Christian Mansell †	9	0	0	0	1	79	11th	4th
2021	Dallara 320-Volkswagen	(United States) Brad Benavides	9	0	0	0	0	39	13th	4th

†Trulli drove for Drivex School until round 3. Mansell drove for Team Motopark from round 7 onwards.

=== Indy Lights ===
Indy Lights results
Year	Car	Drivers	Races	Wins	Poles	F/Laps	Podiums	Points	D.C.	T.C.
2015	Dallara IL-15	(United Arab Emirates) Ed Jones	16	3	3	3	7	324	**3rd**	**2nd**
2015	Dallara IL-15	(United Kingdom) Max Chilton	13	1	3	2	6	258	5th	**2nd**
2015	Dallara IL-15	(Brazil) Nelson Piquet Jr.	2	0	1	0	0	28	15th	**2nd**
2016	Dallara IL-15	(United Arab Emirates) Ed Jones	18	2	8	0	8	363	**1st**	**1st**
2016	Dallara IL-15	(Puerto Rico) Félix Serrallés	18	2	0	2	5	311	6th	**1st**
2016	Dallara IL-15	(United States) Neil Alberico	18	0	0	1	0	193	11th	**1st**
2017	Dallara IL-15	(Brazil) Matheus Leist	16	3	2	1	4	279	4th	**3rd**
2017	Dallara IL-15	(Canada) Zachary Claman DeMelo	16	1	0	3	4	274	5th	**3rd**
2017	Dallara IL-15	(United States) Neil Alberico	16	0	0	0	2	225	8th	**3rd**
2017	Dallara IL-15	(United States) Garth Rickards	15	0	0	0	0	146	14th	**3rd**
2021	Dallara IL-15	(Australia) Alex Peroni	14	0	0	0	1	228	10th	4th
2021	Dallara IL-15	(United States) Christian Bogle	20	0	0	0	0	227	11th	4th

==== In detail ====
Indy Lights results
Year	Chassis	Engine	Drivers	No.	1	2	3	4	5	6	7	8	9	10	11	12	13	14	15	16	17	18	Points		Position	
2015					STP	STP	LBH	ALA	ALA	IMS	IMS	INDY	TOR	TOR	MIL	IOW	MOH	MOH	LAG	LAG			D.C.	T.C.	D.C.	T.C.
2015	Dallara IL-15	Mazda-AER MZR-R 2.0 Turbo I4	(United Arab Emirates) Ed Jones **(R)**	11	**1**	**1***	1*	4	11	3	**4**	10	5	3	8	2	9	9*	3	4			324	363	**3rd**	**2nd**
2015	Dallara IL-15	Mazda-AER MZR-R 2.0 Turbo I4	(United Kingdom) Max Chilton **(R)**	14	12	4	5	5	3	4	3	DNS			6	**1***	2	2	**11**	**3**			258	363	5th	**2nd**
2015	Dallara IL-15	Mazda-AER MZR-R 2.0 Turbo I4	(Brazil) Nelson Piquet Jr. **(R)**	14									**7**	8									28	363	15th	**2nd**
2016					STP	STP	PHX	ALA	ALA	IMS	IMS	INDY	ROA	ROA	IOW	TOR	TOR	MOH	MOH	BOS	LAG	LAG	D.C.	T.C.	D.C.	T.C.
2016	Dallara IL-15	Mazda-AER MZR-R 2.0 Turbo I4	(Puerto Rico) Félix Serrallés	4	1	4	7	2	15	7	5	6	3	14	1	2	10	4	10	7	8	5	311	413	6th	**1st**
2016	Dallara IL-15	Mazda-AER MZR-R 2.0 Turbo I4	(United Arab Emirates) Ed Jones	11	10	7	2	**1***	**2**	**1***	**4**	**2**	4	**13**	**3**	6	5	6	11	2	2	**4**	363	413	**1st**	**1st**
2016	Dallara IL-15	Mazda-AER MZR-R 2.0 Turbo I4	(United States) Neil Alberico **(R)**	22	12	15	9	12	14	11	13	7	11	11	11	12	8	12	8	5	6	10	193	413	11th	**1st**
2017					STP	STP	ALA	ALA	IMS	IMS	INDY	ROA	ROA	IOW	TOR	TOR	MOH	MOH	GAT	WGL			D.C.	T.C.	D.C.	T.C.
2017	Dallara IL-15	Mazda-AER MZR-R 2.0 Turbo I4	(United States) Garth Rickards **(R)**	11	11	13	14	12	10	12	7	13	13	13	9	8	13	14	13	DNS			146	365	14th	**3rd**
2017	Dallara IL-15	Mazda-AER MZR-R 2.0 Turbo I4	(Canada) Zachary Claman DeMelo	13	8	7	5	14	2	11	6	10	1*	6	2	3	5	4	6	6			274	365	5th	**3rd**
2017	Dallara IL-15	Mazda-AER MZR-R 2.0 Turbo I4	(United States) Neil Alberico	22	3	15	3	4	4	6	4	7	8	11	8	14	6	9	12	11			225	365	8th	**3rd**
2017	Dallara IL-15	Mazda-AER MZR-R 2.0 Turbo I4	(Brazil) Matheus Leist **(R)**	26	15	11	4	7	5	3	**1***	**1***	4	1*	13	5	11	10	10	4			279	365	4th	**3rd**

(key)

=== Japanese Formula 3 Championship ===
==== As OIRC team YTB by Carlin ====
Year	Car	Drivers	Races	Wins	Poles	F/Laps	Podiums	Points	D.C.	T.C.
2019	Dallara F317-Spiess	(France) Charles Milesi	15	0	0	0	0	13	9th	4th
2019	Dallara F317-Spiess	(Belgium) Esteban Muth	3	0	0	0	0	0	15th	4th
2019	Dallara F315-Spiess	(Japan) Yoshiaki Katayama	20	1	0	0	2	34	7th	4th
