= Carlin Motorsport =

British former auto racing team

(United Kingdom) Carlin
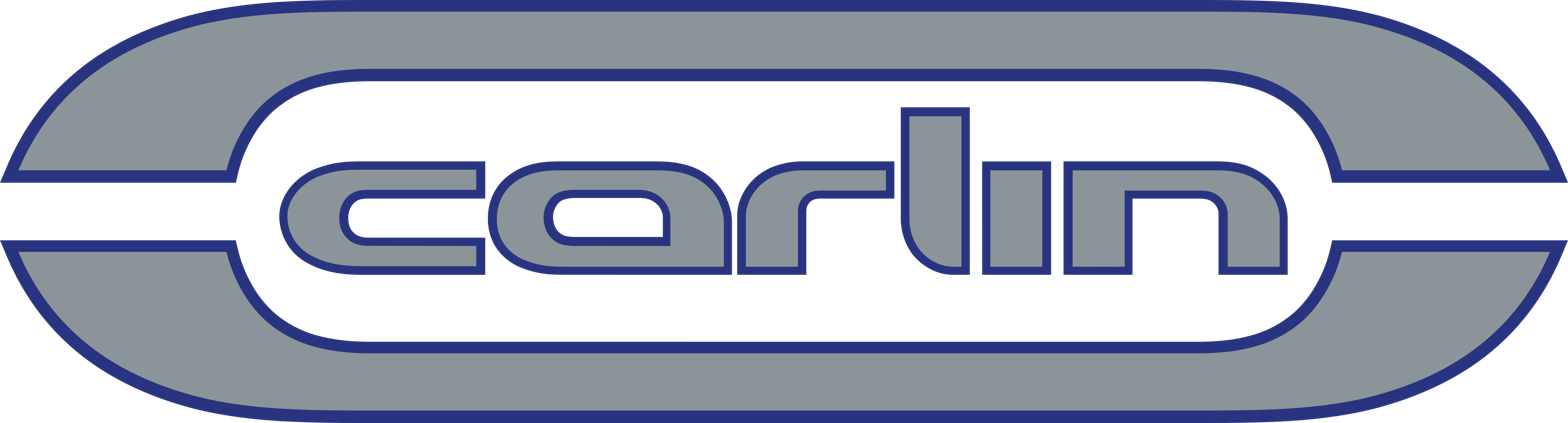
- Founded: 1996
- Founder(s): Trevor Carlin; Martin Stone
- Folded: 2023
- Former names: Carlin Motorsport; Rodin Carlin
- Base: Farnham, Surrey, England
- Team principal(s): Trevor Carlin; Stephanie Carlin
- Former series: FIA Formula 2 Championship; FIA Formula 3 Championship; GB3 Championship; F1 Academy; F4 British Championship; F4 Spanish Championship; Formula 4 UAE Championship; ESkootr Championship; Formula Winter Series; A1 Grand Prix (Note: Operation Team at A1 Team Japan, A1 Team Korea, A1 Team Lebanon, A1 Team Portugal); Porsche Supercup; Eurocup Formula Renault 2.0; Formula Renault 2.0 UK; Formula 3 Euro Series; British Formula 3 International Series; GP3 Series; Formula Renault 3.5 Series; Formula E (Note: Operation Team at Mahindra Racing team); GP2 Series; FIA European F3; European Le Mans Series; Asian Le Mans Series; Euroformula Open Championship; Indy Lights; IndyCar Series
- Teams' Championships: Formula Renault 3.5 Series: 2011; GP3 Series: 2014; F4 British Championship: 2015-2017 2020 2022-2023; Indy Lights: 2016; FIA Formula 2 Championship: 2018
- Drivers' Championships: British Formula 3 International Series: 2001: Takuma Sato; 2003: Alan van der Merwe; 2005: Álvaro Parente; 2008: Jaime Alguersuari; 2009: Daniel Ricciardo; 2010: Jean-Éric Vergne; 2011: Felipe Nasr; 2012: Jack Harvey; 2013: Jordan King; Formula Renault 3.5 Series: 2010: Mikhail Aleshin; 2011: Robert Wickens; GP3 Series: 2014: Alex Lynn; F4 British Championship: 2015: Lando Norris; 2016: Max Fewtrell; 2017: Jamie Caroline; 2019: Zane Maloney; 2023: Louis Sharp; Indy Lights: 2016: Ed Jones; BRDC British F3 Championship: 2017: Enaam Ahmed; 2019: Clément Novalak; FIA F3 European Championship: 2017: Lando Norris

Carlin, formerly known as Carlin Motorsport and Rodin Carlin, was a motor racing team based in the United Kingdom. It primarily competed in junior racing championships such as FIA Formula 2 and FIA Formula 3. Carlin also competed in top level series such as the IndyCar Series and the European Le Mans Series.

Originally founded in 1996 by Trevor Carlin and Martin Stone, Carlin has competed in Porsche Supercup, Nissan World Series, Formula BMW UK, World Series by Renault, F3 Euro Series, British F3, FIA European F3 Championship, FIA Formula E, GP3 Series, GP2 Series all with race winning success.

In 2009, Carlin Motorsport was reborn as Carlin, part of the Capsicum Motorsport Group headed up by Grahame Chilton, father of Max Chilton, and Rupert Swallow. In 2023, New Zealand–based manufacturer Rodin Cars became the majority shareholder following investment from founder David Dicker, in a deal that saw the team rebrand as Rodin Carlin. After a fallout between Dicker and the Carlins, Trevor and Stephanie Carlin both departed the team in late 2023, with Dicker taking over fully and renaming the company Rodin Motorsport.

For many, Carlin has provided a gateway to the higher echelons of the sport, including F1 drivers Sebastian Vettel, Nico Rosberg, Robert Kubica, Takuma Sato, Anthony Davidson, Jaime Alguersuari, Daniel Ricciardo, Max Chilton, Jean-Éric Vergne, Kevin Magnussen, Felipe Nasr, Narain Karthikeyan, Rio Haryanto, George Russell, Carlos Sainz Jr. and Lando Norris. Other notable Carlin drivers are Josef Newgarden, Patricio O'Ward, Conor Daly, Jamie Green, Oliver Jarvis, Oliver Turvey, Álvaro Parente, Charlie Kimball, Robert Wickens, Sérgio Sette Câmara and Ed Jones.

== History ==
Founded in 1996 as Carlin Motorsport, for the 2010 season, the team underwent a restructuring, with a significant investment from Grahame Chilton's Capsicum Motorsport. The team became known as simply Carlin, who sought the partnership in order to secure the long-term future of the team.

=== A1 GP ===
In the 2005-06 A1 Grand Prix season, Carlin were contracted to run the Lebanon, Portugal and Japan entries. The team stuck with just the Lebanon team for the 2006–07 and 2007–08 seasons before switching to the Korea team in 2008–09 before the series folded next season.

=== British Formula 3 ===
The team has been competing in the British Formula 3 Championship since 1997. The team achieved their first victory with Narain Karthikeyan in 1999 and since 2001, has won 9 championships to become the most successful team in British F3 history. The champions are Takuma Sato (2001), Alan van der Merwe (2003), Álvaro Parente (2005), Jaime Alguersuari (2008), Daniel Ricciardo (2009), Jean-Éric Vergne (2010), Felipe Nasr (2011) Jack Harvey (2012), Jordan King (2013) and Enaam Ahmed (2017).

=== Formula 3 Euro Series and European Formula 3 ===
Carlin joined the Formula 3 Euro Series in 2008. In 2012, after poor results in the first three seasons, William Buller finished fifth and Carlos Sainz Jr. finished ninth. Carlin also entered the 2012 FIA European Formula 3 Championship, where Sainz finished fifth and Buller sixth.

In the 2013 FIA European Formula 3 Championship, Harry Tincknell was fifth and Jordan King was sixth. In 2014, Antonio Giovinazzi finished sixth, King seventh and Jake Dennis ninth. In 2015, Giovinazzi was runner-up and George Russell finished sixth. 2016 was a rough year for Carlin as none of its drivers finished in top 10 in the series.

However, in 2017, Lando Norris won the FIA European Formula 3 Championship as a rookie driver with Carlin, making Carlin the only team other than Prema to ever win the title in this series. Jehan Daruvala finished sixth and Ferdinand Habsburg was seventh. 2018 was the final year of FIA European Formula 3 Championship, in which Daruvala was tenth, Sacha Fenestraz was eleventh and Habsburg was thirteenth.

=== Formula 3 Macau Grand Prix ===
Carlin has entered the Formula 3 Macau Grand Prix since 1998. Takuma Sato won in 2001, Robert Kubica was second in 2005, Sébastien Buemi was fourth in 2006, Brendon Hartley was third in 2008, Felipe Nasr was second in 2011, António Félix da Costa was first in 2012 and again in 2016, and Antonio Giovinazzi was fourth in 2015.

=== Formula Nissan/Renault 3.5 Series ===
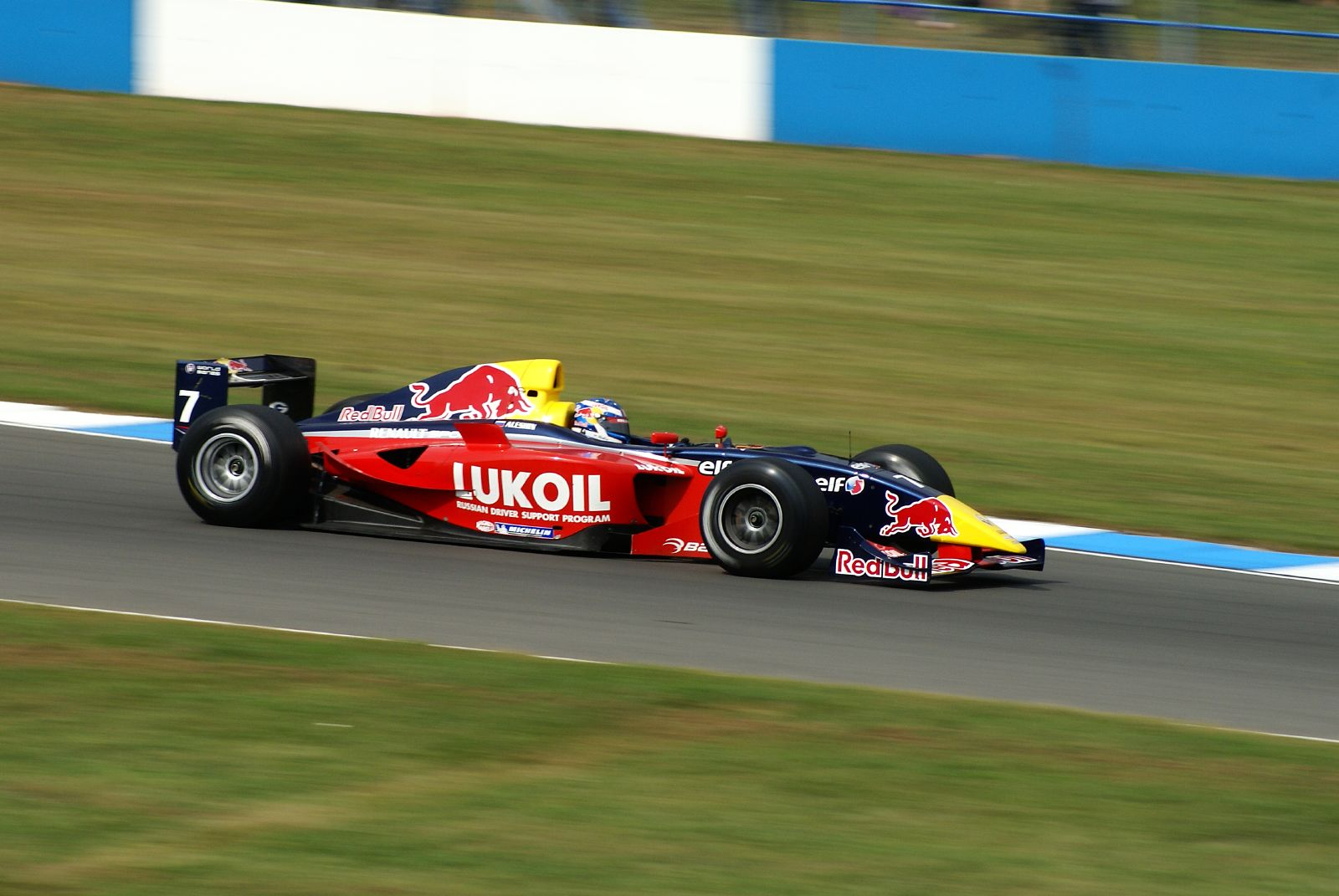
Mikhail Aleshin driving for Carlin at the Donington Park round of the 2007 World Series by Renault season.

The team has been contesting in the series since 2003, and have won a race in the series every year since then. The team has won two drivers titles and one team championship. The champions are Mikhail Aleshin and Robert Wickens in 2010 and 2011 respectively.

Carlin took a year sabbatical in 2014 due to driver and budgetary issues. They returned in 2015, replacing Czech outfit ISR Racing, before withdrawing once again after the series lost its Renault backing. Carlin was replaced in the 2016 Formula V8 3.5 Championship by RP Motorsport.

=== GP3 ===
The team joined the GP3 Series in 2010 for its inaugural season, which it finished 5th in the championship with 42 points overall. In its second season in 2011, the team finished 9th overall. In the 2012 the team finished third in the teams' standings and third in the drivers' championship after a strong season from António Félix da Costa and teammates Alex Brundle and Will Buller. Carlin were fourth in the teams' standings at the end of the 2013 season whilst Arden's Daniil Kvyat claimed the Driver's Championship. The following year, they claimed the Constructor's title in addition to Red Bull Junior driver Alex Lynn's title win. For the 2015 season, Jann Mardenborough, Mitch Gilbert and Ferrari Academy driver Antonio Fuoco will race for Carlin.

At the end of the 2015 season, Carlin withdrew from the series.

=== GP2 ===
The team joined the GP2 Series in 2011 for the first time. The team's lead driver was Max Chilton—a former Carlin driver in British F3—whilst the second seat was initially taken by Mikhail Aleshin, who had won the Formula Renault 3.5 Series championship with the team the previous year. He soon ran out of financial support and was replaced by Oliver Turvey (another former Carlin driver in other series), who made a one-off appearance before being replaced in turn by Álvaro Parente (the 2005 British F3 champion with Carlin).

For the 2012 season, the team formed a partnership with the Marussia Formula One team. Chilton retained his seat and improved dramatically, taking two race victories on his way to fourth place in the drivers' championship. His teammate was Rio Haryanto, promoted from the Marussia-backed Manor Motorsport GP3 Series team. He finished 14th in the championship with a pole position and a fastest lap, and Carlin improved to fifth place in the teams' championship.

In the 2013 season, Carlin improved once again with drivers Felipe Nasr and Jolyon Palmer, taking two wins in total and nine podiums. Nasr was a contender for the drivers' title up until the final stages of the season. An eventful season finale saw the team lose out on the teams' championship to Russian Time, with both finishing on equal points but Russian Time taking more wins over the course of the season.

Nasr left the team at the end of the 2014 season to race for Sauber in Formula One, while his co-driver Julián Leal was retained for 2015 and paired with Marco Sorensen. The team struggled throughout the season (often having to change drivers) and finished 9th overall, marking the first time since 2012 that Carlin failed to finish in the top two.

Carlin signed Marvin Kirchhofer and Sergio Canamasas for the 2016 season and finished tenth in the standings. The team withdrew from the series the following year.

=== Indy Lights ===
On 1 November 2014, Carlin announced that the team would be joining the U.S. IndyCar feeder series, Indy Lights. They will start racing in the 2015 Indy Lights season, operating out of a new U.S. base in Poughkeepsie, New York. Dallara, AER and Cooper will be suppliers to the series, companies which Carlin has experience working with from previous series.

Ed Jones moved to Carlin's Indy Lights team in 2015 after driving in their Formula 3 efforts. He was joined in Carlin's debut season by former Formula 1 drivers and Carlin graduates Max Chilton and temporarily Nelson Piquet Jr.

2016 saw Jones continue with the team, partnered by Félix Serrallés and Neil Alberico. Jones took the drivers championship on the season, while Carlin won the teams championship.

2017 saw only Alberico remain, while Zachary Claman DeMelo, Matheus Leist, and Garth Rickards joined the team. The highlight of the season was Leist winning the Freedom 100. Following the 2017 season, Carlin ended its Indy Lights program to focus on joining the IndyCar Series from 2018.

However, the team announced a return to the series for the 2021 season, becoming a part of the Jay Howard Driver Development ladder, with Alex Peroni and a yet to be announced driver forming their two car entry

=== Formula One ===
In April 2006, Trevor Carlin confirmed that the team had applied for a place in the Formula One World Championship from the 2008 season, although this was later rejected, in favour of the Prodrive F1 application. They were linked with applying again in 2011, but the team denied this insisting it was concentrating on success in the junior formulas. Carlin again bid to join Formula One in 2023.

=== Lets Race to Reality ===
In 2014, Carlin announced that they had teamed up with Surrey-based simulator experience company, Lets Race. Open to any driver over 16, Lets Race to Reality's first round is held at the Lets Race simulator facility in Horley. The winners of the first round are invited to a karting event at Buckmore Park kart circuit in Kent, before a final selection process at Carlin's factory in Farnham. Finalists take part in various exercises, including a session in the team's professional simulator with a race engineer. The candidates then take part in an interview process with racing professionals, including Trevor Carlin and John Surtees. The winner of the event will receive a full day's testing in a Formula 3 car at Pembrey Circuit in Wales.

Piers Prior won the first competition in 2014, and completed his test at Pembrey in Jake Dennis' car.

=== Formula E ===
In 2014, Carlin became the technical service provider of Mahindra Racing, running the outfit for the 2014–15 Formula E season. Mahindra and Carlin split, and Mahindra have since partnered with Spanish team Campos Racing.

=== IndyCar Series ===
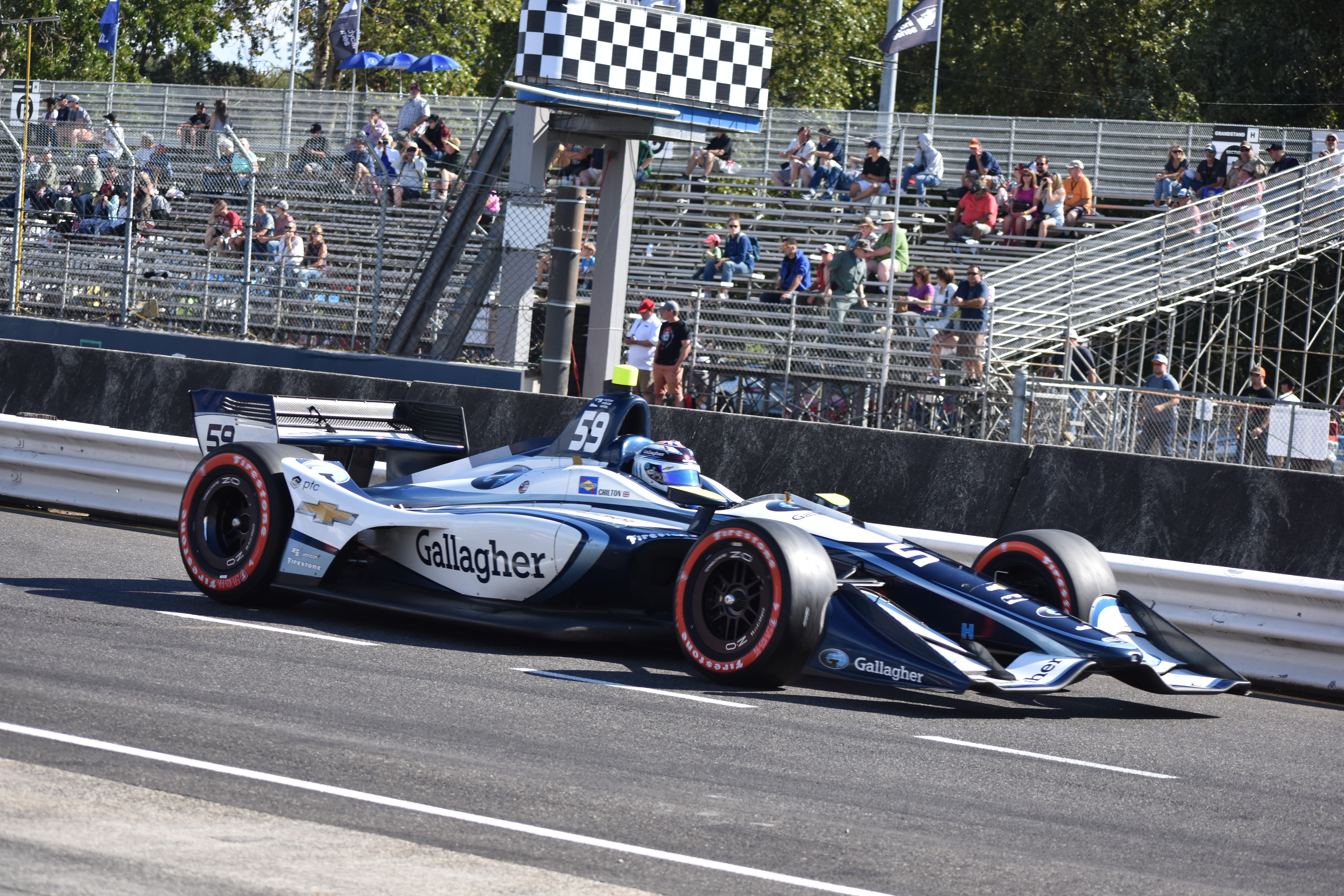
Max Chilton in 2018.

In December 2017, Carlin announced it would enter the IndyCar Series beginning with the 2018 season with two full-time entries that would be driven by two of its former drivers from Formula 3, Max Chilton and Charlie Kimball. Carlin's entry to the IndyCar Series marked the team's debut in a non-junior open wheel formula, fulfilling a long-held dream for the team. At the end of the 2021 season, Carlin pulled out of the series and sold its assets to Juncos Hollinger Racing.

=== FIA Formula 2 Championship ===
In 2018, Carlin joined FIA Formula 2 Championship, after withdrawing from the year before. They grabbed the teams' title from their first attempt with Sérgio Sette Câmara and Lando Norris. In the drivers' championship, Norris finished in 2nd place and Sérgio Sette Câmara was in sixth. In 2019 Nobuharu Matsushita and Louis Delétraz represented the Carlin team and finished sixth and eighth respectively. 2020 saw another good results for Carlin, as their rookie driver Yuki Tsunoda finished in 3rd place in the drivers' championship and Carlin finished in third in teams' championship with four race wins to its name. Jehan Daruvala was in twelfth. Daruvala was retained for the 2021 season and Dan Ticktum joined the team to replace F1-bound Yuki Tsunoda.

=== Formula 3 ===
In October 2018, Carlin was listed as one of ten teams that would participate in the inaugural FIA Formula 3 Championship. In January 2019, Carlin entered into a partnership with Japanese investment firm Buzz, with the Honda-backed Teppei Natori joining their Formula 3 team as part of the deal, and partook in the Japanese Formula 3 Championship in collaboration with OIRC team YTB, fielding French driver Charles Milesi. In 2020 Carlin achieved their first podium in F3 with Clement Novalak who finished 12th in the standings.

=== Sportscars ===
Having previously run Sascha Maassen in the 2001 Porsche Supercup, Carlin made a long-awaited return to sportscars by entering the 2019 European Le Mans Series LMP2 category with the only Dallara P217 on the grid. Piloting the #45 would be Jack Manchester, Harry Tincknell and Ben Barnicoat, with Olivier Pla and Harrison Newey featuring as one off replacements across the season.

=== eSkootr Championship ===
Carlin became the first team to announce their participation in the eSkootr Championship (eSc), an international electric racing scooter series, and the team's first involvement in a two-wheeled series.

=== Extreme E ===
In 2023, Lewis Hamilton's X44 will partner with Carlin for the 2023 season and will be led by team principal Stephanie Carlin.

== Notable drivers ==
=== Current Formula One drivers ===
- Carlos Sainz Jr., raced in 2012 and 2013 for Carlin at Macau. He drove for Scuderia Toro Rosso in 2016 and 2017 after making his debut in 2015. He drives for Williams, after previously racing for Ferrari, Renault and McLaren.
- Lando Norris, raced for Carlin from 2015 to 2018 in the MSA Formula Championship, BRDC British Formula 3 Championship (part-time), FIA Formula 3 European Championship and FIA Formula 2 Championship. He won the MSA Formula Championship in 2015 and FIA Formula 3 European Championship in 2017. He was Reserve Driver and test driver for McLaren in 2018 after joining the McLaren junior driver programme in 2017 and was promoted to a full-time race seat in Formula One with McLaren in 2019 alongside former Carlin driver Carlos Sainz Jr. In 2021 and 2022 he was joined by Ricciardo.
- George Russell, former Formula 2 and GP3 Champion, made his debut with Williams in 2019, and stood in for Lewis Hamilton at Mercedes at the 2020 Sakhir Grand Prix, before moving to Mercedes as full-time driver alongside Hamilton in 2022. Drove for Carlin in the FIA Formula 3 European Championship in 2015.
- Yuki Tsunoda, who has raced for AlphaTauri/Racing Bulls since the 2021 season, drove for Carlin in the FIA Formula 2 Championship in 2020.
- Liam Lawson, who drives for Red Bull Racing in the 2025 season, drove for Carlin in the FIA Formula 2 Championship in 2022.

=== All Formula One drivers that drove for Carlin ===
Sebastian Vettel, four time Formula One World Champion with Red Bull Racing. Drove for Carlin in FR3.5 and F3 in 2006 & 2007.

Robert Kubica drove for Carlin at the 2005 Macau Grand Prix. He went on to complete 76 races with BMW Sauber and Renault. He returned to Formula 1 in 2019 for one year after he secured race seat with Williams alongside another former Carlin driver George Russell after a year of being Williams reserve and test driver in 2018. He currently races for BMW Orlen Team ART in the 2020 DTM Championship.

Brendon Hartley raced for Carlin over a number of years, and subsequently drove for Porsche in the World Endurance Championship. He was the test driver for Red Bull, and Mercedes. He now is a development driver for Scuderia Ferrari after previously driving for Scuderia Toro Rosso, having made his debut at the 2017 United States Grand Prix.

Felipe Nasr raced for Carlin in F3 and GP2 between 2012 and 2014. He formerly raced for Sauber after making his debut in 2015. He currently races in the WeatherTech SportsCar Championship also known as IMSA.

Rio Haryanto drove for Carlin in the GP2 Series in 2012. He formerly raced for Manor Racing after making his debut at the 2016 Australian Grand Prix.

Jolyon Palmer drove for Carlin for the 2013 GP2 Series season, and formerly raced for Renault Sport F1 Team.

Narain Karthikeyan drove for Carlin in the 2003 World Series by Nissan season, and for Jordan & HRT between 2005 and 2012. He most recently raced in Super Formula.

Tiago Monteiro raced in the 2004 World Series by Nissan season, and had two seasons in F1 with Jordan and Midland/Spyker in 2005 and 2006.

Jaime Alguersuari drove for Carlin in the 2009 Formula Renault 3.5 Series season. He had 3 seasons with Scuderia Toro Rosso between 2009 and 2011.

Sébastien Buemi raced at the 2006 Macau Grand Prix for Carlin. He drove for Scuderia Toro Rosso for 3 seasons between 2009 and 2011 alongside Alguersuari.

Bruno Senna races for Mahindra Racing Formula E team, run by Carlin. He competed for HRT, Renault and Williams between 2010 and 2012.

Karun Chandhok raced for Carlin-operated Mahindra Racing in the 2014-15 Formula E Season. He drove for HRT and Lotus in 2010 and 2011. He last competed in the 2017 24 Hours of Le Mans with Tockwith Motorsports and is currently as an analyst for Sky Sports's F1 coverage.

Oliver Turvey raced in Formula Renault and GP2 for Carlin and is the McLaren test & reserve driver. Won the 2014 24 Hours of Le Mans LMP2 class.

Anthony Davidson drove for the team in F3. He was the 2014 World Endurance Championship champion with Toyota Racing, and completed 24 races in F1.

Max Chilton, raced in 2013 and 2014 for Marussia. Drove for Carlin in F3 and GP2 between 2009 and 2012. In 2015 Chilton rejoined Carlin to race in Indy Lights, and graduated to join Chip Ganassi Racing for the 2016 IndyCar season. For the 2018 IndyCar season, he moved back to Carlin to head their new IndyCar effort.

Jean-Éric Vergne, drove for Scuderia Toro Rosso until the end of 2014, when he was replaced by Max Verstappen and Carlos Sainz Jr. Drove for Carlin in the 2011 Formula Renault 3.5 Series season. He currently races in FIA Formula E championship with the Techeetah and is the 2017/2018 FIA Formula E champion.

Will Stevens made his F1 debut with Caterham F1 at the 2014 Abu Dhabi Grand Prix, and raced for Manor Marussia F1 Team for the 2015 Formula One season. He now races for Manor Motorsport in the 2016 FIA World Endurance Championship.

Daniil Kvyat raced for Carlin in European F3 in 2013. He has raced for Red Bull Racing and Scuderia Toro Rosso, making his debut at the 2014 Australian Grand Prix. He made his return to Formula 1 with Scuderia Toro Rosso for 2019 and 2020.

Kevin Magnussen drove for Carlin in the 2012 Formula Renault 3.5 Series season. His debut season in F1 was with McLaren, and he spent 2015 as a test driver for the team, before joining Renault for 2016. He then raced for Haas until the end of 2020, before moving on to WeatherTech SportsCar Championship in 2021. He came back in F1 for the 2022 season with Haas.

Logan Sargeant drove for Carlin in the 2022 Formula 2 Championship. His debut F1 season in 2023 was alongside Alex Albon with Williams.

Carlos Sainz Jr., raced in 2012 and 2013 for Carlin at Macau. He drove for Scuderia Toro Rosso in 2016 and 2017 after making his debut in 2015. He drives for Williams, after previously racing for Ferrari, Renault and McLaren.

Lando Norris, raced for Carlin from 2015 to 2018 in the MSA Formula Championship, BRDC British Formula 3 Championship (part-time), FIA Formula 3 European Championship and FIA Formula 2 Championship. He won the MSA Formula Championship in 2015 and FIA Formula 3 European Championship in 2017. He was Reserve Driver and test driver for McLaren in 2018 after joining the McLaren junior driver programme in 2017 and was promoted to a full-time race seat in Formula One with McLaren in 2019 alongside former Carlin driver Carlos Sainz Jr. In 2021 and 2022 he was joined by Ricciardo.

George Russell, former Formula 2 and GP3 Champion, made his debut with Williams in 2019, and stood in for Lewis Hamilton at Mercedes at the 2020 Sakhir Grand Prix, before moving to Mercedes as full-time driver alongside Hamilton in 2022. Drove for Carlin in the FIA Formula 3 European Championship in 2015.

Yuki Tsunoda, who has raced for AlphaTauri/Racing Bulls since the 2021 season, drove for Carlin in the FIA Formula 2 Championship in 2020.

Liam Lawson, who drives for Red Bull Racing in the 2025 season, drove for Carlin in the FIA Formula 2 Championship in 2022.

Other drivers like Jenson Button may not of driven for Carlin, but they did testing with Carlin which then helped them reach Formula One.

=== Other notable drivers ===
- Sebastian Vettel, four time Formula One World Champion with Red Bull Racing. Drove for Carlin in FR3.5 and F3 in 2006 & 2007.
- Robert Kubica drove for Carlin at the 2005 Macau Grand Prix. He went on to complete 76 races with BMW Sauber and Renault. He returned to Formula 1 in 2019 for one year after he secured race seat with Williams alongside another former Carlin driver George Russell after a year of being Williams reserve and test driver in 2018. He currently races for BMW Orlen Team ART in the 2020 DTM Championship
- Brendon Hartley raced for Carlin over a number of years, and subsequently drove for Porsche in the World Endurance Championship. He was the test driver for Red Bull, and Mercedes. He now is a development driver for Scuderia Ferrari after previously driving for Scuderia Toro Rosso, having made his debut at the 2017 United States Grand Prix.
- Felipe Nasr raced for Carlin in F3 and GP2 between 2012 and 2014. He formerly raced for Sauber after making his debut in 2015. He currently races in the WeatherTech SportsCar Championship
- Marcus Ericsson drove for Carlin at the 2008 Macau Grand Prix. He drove in 2014 for Caterham F1 and has driven for Sauber between 2015 and 2018. He currently drives in the Indycar Series.
- Rio Haryanto drove for Carlin in the GP2 Series in 2012. He formerly raced for Manor Racing after making his debut at the 2016 Australian Grand Prix.
- Jolyon Palmer drove for Carlin for the 2013 GP2 Series season, and formerly raced for Renault Sport F1 Team.
- Narain Karthikeyan drove for Carlin in the 2003 World Series by Nissan season, and for Jordan & HRT between 2005 and 2012. He most recently raced in Super Formula.
- Tiago Monteiro raced in the 2004 World Series by Nissan season, and had two seasons in F1 with Jordan and Midland/Spyker in 2005 and 2006.
- Jaime Alguersuari drove for Carlin in the 2009 Formula Renault 3.5 Series season. He had 3 seasons with Scuderia Toro Rosso between 2009 and 2011.
- Sébastien Buemi raced at the 2006 Macau Grand Prix. He drove for Scuderia Toro Rosso for 3 seasons between 2009 and 2011 alongside Alguersuari.
- Bruno Senna races for Mahindra Racing Formula E team, run by Carlin. He competed for HRT, Renault and Williams between 2010 and 2012.
- Karun Chandhok raced for Carlin-operated Mahindra Racing in the 2014-15 Formula E Season. He drove for HRT and Lotus in 2010 and 2011. He last competed in the 2017 24 Hours of Le Mans with Tockwith Motorsports and is currently as an analyst for Sky Sports's F1 coverage.
- Alan van der Merwe raced for Carlin in British F3 in 2002 and 2003. He currently drives the medical car in F1.
- Oliver Turvey raced in Formula Renault and GP2 for Carlin, and is the McLaren test & reserve driver. Won the 2014 24 Hours of Le Mans LMP2 class.
- Will Power raced for Carlin in the 2005 Formula Renault 3.5 Series season, and was the 2014 IndyCar Series and 2018 Indianapolis 500 champion with Team Penske.
- Anthony Davidson drove for the team in F3. He was the 2014 World Endurance Championship champion with Toyota Racing, and completed 24 races in F1.
- Max Chilton, raced in 2013 and 2014 for Marussia. Drove for Carlin in F3 and GP2 between 2009 and 2012. In 2015 Chilton rejoined Carlin to race in Indy Lights, and graduated to join Chip Ganassi Racing for the 2016 IndyCar season. For the 2018 IndyCar season, he moved back to Carlin to head their new IndyCar effort.
- Conor Daly raced for Carlin in the 2011 GP3 Series Championship, returning to Carlin part-time in the 2019 IndyCar season to drive ovals in place of Chilton. He claimed Carlin's first Indycar Series pole position at the 2020 Iowa IndyCar 250s for the first race of the doubleheader.
- Jean-Éric Vergne, drove for Scuderia Toro Rosso until the end of 2014, when he was replaced by Max Verstappen and Carlos Sainz Jr. Drove for Carlin in the 2011 Formula Renault 3.5 Series season. He currently races in FIA Formula E championship with the Techeetah and is the 2017/2018 FIA Formula E champion.
- Will Stevens made his F1 debut with Caterham F1 at the 2014 Abu Dhabi Grand Prix, and raced for Manor Marussia F1 Team for the 2015 Formula One season. He now races for Manor Motorsport in the 2016 FIA World Endurance Championship.
- Josef Newgarden raced for Carlin in the 2010 GP3 Series and won the 2017 and 2019 IndyCar Series championship with Team Penske.
- Robert Wickens raced for Carlin in the Formula Renault 3.5 Series and British Formula 3 between 2007 and 2011. He was driving in the IndyCar Series for Schmidt Peterson Motorsports in 2018. He won a pole at the 2018 Firestone Grand Prix of St. Petersburg, his first race in the series.
- Charlie Kimball raced for Carlin in the 2005 British Formula 3 International Series. He joined Chip Ganassi Racing for his rookie IndyCar season in 2011. He picked up his first and only win at Mid-Ohio in the 2013. He rejoined Carlin for their IndyCar effort in the 2018 season.
- Takuma Sato raced for Carlin in British Formula 3 from 2000 to 2001. He formerly raced for Jordan Grand Prix, British American Racing, and Super Aguri in Formula One. He later went on to win the 2017 Indianapolis 500 with Andretti Autosport and the 2020 Indianapolis 500 with Rahal Letterman Lanigan Racing.
- Daniil Kvyat raced for Carlin in European F3 in 2013. He has raced for Red Bull Racing and Scuderia Toro Rosso, making his debut at the 2014 Australian Grand Prix. He made his return to Formula 1 with Scuderia Toro Rosso for 2019 and 2020.
- Sérgio Sette Câmara drove for Carlin in 2018 FIA Formula 2 Championship alongside Lando Norris. He previously raced in Formula E with NIO/ERT.
- Tom Blomqvist drove for Carlin the 2014 FIA Formula 3 European Championship, where he finished runner-up in the championship. He will race in the 2024 IndyCar season for Meyer Shank Racing and in the 2024 IMSA SportsCar Championship with Cadillac Racing for the Michelin Endurance Cup rounds.
- Daniel Ricciardo, had raced for Red Bull Racing and for Scuderia Toro Rosso. He drove for Carlin in the 2009 Macau Grand Prix. He moved to the Renault F1 team in 2019 and 2020, and McLaren in 2021 and 2022 alongside former Carlin Driver Lando Norris. He most recently raced for RB Formula One Team alongside Yuki Tsunoda in 2024.
- Kevin Magnussen drove for Carlin in the 2012 Formula Renault 3.5 Series season. His debut season in F1 was with McLaren, and he spent 2015 as a test driver for the team, before joining Renault for 2016. He then raced for Haas until the end of 2020, before moving on to WeatherTech SportsCar Championship in 2021. He came back in F1 for the 2022 season with Haas.
- Logan Sargeant drove for Carlin in the 2022 Formula 2 Championship. His debut F1 season in 2023 was alongside Alex Albon with Williams.

== Timeline ==
Former series
British Formula Three Championship	1997–2014
Porsche Supercup	2001
World Series by Nissan	2003–2004
Formula BMW UK	2004–2007
3000 Pro Series	2005
Italian Formula Three Championship	2005
A1 Grand Prix	2005–2009
Formula Renault 3.5 Series	2005–2013, 2015
Eurocup Formula Renault 2.0	2007
British Formula Renault Championship	2007
Formula 3 Euro Series	2008–2009, 2011–2012
GP3 Series	2010–2015
GP2 Asia Series	2011
GP2 Series	2011–2016
FIA Formula 3 European Championship	2012–2018
Formula E	2014–2015
Indy Lights	2015–2017, 2021
F4 British Championship	2015–2017, 2019–2023
Euroformula Open Championship	2016–2021
GB3 Championship	2016–2023
IndyCar Series	2018–2021
FIA Formula 2 Championship	2018–2023
Japanese Formula 3 Championship	2019
European Le Mans Series	2019
Asian Le Mans Series	2019–2020
FIA Formula 3 Championship	2019–2023
ESkootr Championship	2022
Formula 4 UAE Championship	2023
F4 Spanish Championship	2023
Extreme E	2023
F1 Academy	2023

== Footnotes ==
Achievements
Preceded by Tech 1 Racing	Formula Renault 3.5 Series Teams' Champion; 2011	Succeeded by Tech 1 Racing
Preceded by ART Grand Prix	GP3 Series Teams' Champion; 2014	Succeeded by ART Grand Prix
Preceded by Schmidt Peterson Motorsports	Indy Lights Teams' Champion; 2016	Succeeded by Belardi Auto Racing
Preceded by Russian Time	FIA Formula 2 Teams' Champion; 2018	Succeeded by DAMS
