= 2024 Indianapolis 500 =

American motor race

108th Indianapolis 500

Indianapolis Motor Speedway

Indianapolis 500
- Sanctioning body: IndyCar
- Season: 2024 IndyCar season
- Date: May 26, 2024
- Winner: (United States) Josef Newgarden
- Winning team: Team Penske
- Winning Chief Mechanic: Chad Gordon
- Time of race: 2:58:49.4079
- Average speed: 167.763 mph (269.988 km/h)
- Pole position: (New Zealand) Scott McLaughlin
- Pole speed: 234.220 mph (376.940 km/h)
- Rookie of the Year: (United States) Kyle Larson
- Most laps led: (New Zealand) Scott McLaughlin (66)

Pre-race ceremonies
- National anthem: Jordin Sparks
- "Back Home Again in Indiana": Jim Cornelison
- Starting command: Roger Penske
- Pace car: Chevrolet Corvette E-Ray 3LZ
- Pace car driver: Ken Griffey Jr.
- Starter: Aaron Likens
- Honorary starter: Austin Butler and Jodie Comer

Television in the United States
- Network: NBC
- Announcers: Leigh Diffey, Townsend Bell, James Hinchcliffe
- Nielsen ratings: 2.6 (5.344 million viewers)

Chronology
| Previous | Next |
|---|---|
| 2023 | 2025 |

The 2024 Indianapolis 500, branded as the 108th Running of the Indianapolis 500 presented by Gainbridge for sponsorship reasons, was a 500-mile (804.5 km, 200 lap) race in the 2024 IndyCar Series, that was held on Sunday, May 26, 2024, at the Indianapolis Motor Speedway in Speedway, Indiana, United States. The month of May activities formally began on Saturday, May 11 with the Sonsio Grand Prix on the combined road course. Practice on the oval began on Tuesday May 14. Time trials were held on May 18–19, and Carb Day, the traditional final day of practice, along with the Pit Stop Challenge, took place on May 24. It was the final Indy 500 to air on NBC because less than a month later, Fox would gain the rights to the NTT IndyCar Series from NBC.

Josef Newgarden of Team Penske entered the race as the defending winner. His teammate Scott McLaughlin won the pole position with a four-lap average speed of 234.220 miles per hour (376.941 km/h), the fastest pole position speed (and second-fastest qualifying speed) in Indy history. McLaughlin, Newgarden, and their teammate Will Power took all three spots on the front row, the first for a single team since Penske did so in 1988.

A heavy thunderstorm swept through the area on the morning of the race. The race was delayed by four hours, but was run to completion without further interruption. Josef Newgarden won the race after passing Pato O'Ward in turn three on the final lap for his second-consecutive Indianapolis 500 victory. It was the fourth Indianapolis 500 to end in a last-lap pass after 2006, 2011, and 2023. Newgarden became the first driver to win the race two years in a row since Hélio Castroneves won in 2001–2002, as well as the first driver to ever win multiple runnings of the Indianapolis 500 with last-lap passes. It was the record-extending 20th Indy victory for Team Penske and car owner Roger Penske, and second victory for the team since Penske bought the track in late 2019. Newgarden's victory, however, is mildly controversial. One year later, Team Penske was penalized for using illegally modified attenuators. Newgarden's winning car was discovered to have had the same unapproved part installed.

For the first time since 2014, a driver attempted "Double Duty": Kyle Larson attempted to compete in the Indianapolis 500 and the Coca-Cola 600 at Charlotte on the same day. But rain delayed the start of the race at Indy, and the race at Charlotte was ended early due to rain, foiling Larson's attempt. Larson led 4 laps during the race, finished 18th, and was named rookie of the year. Later in the season, Larson won the Brickyard 400, in becoming the 7th driver to race in the Indy 500 and Brickyard 400 in the same year.

== Race background ==
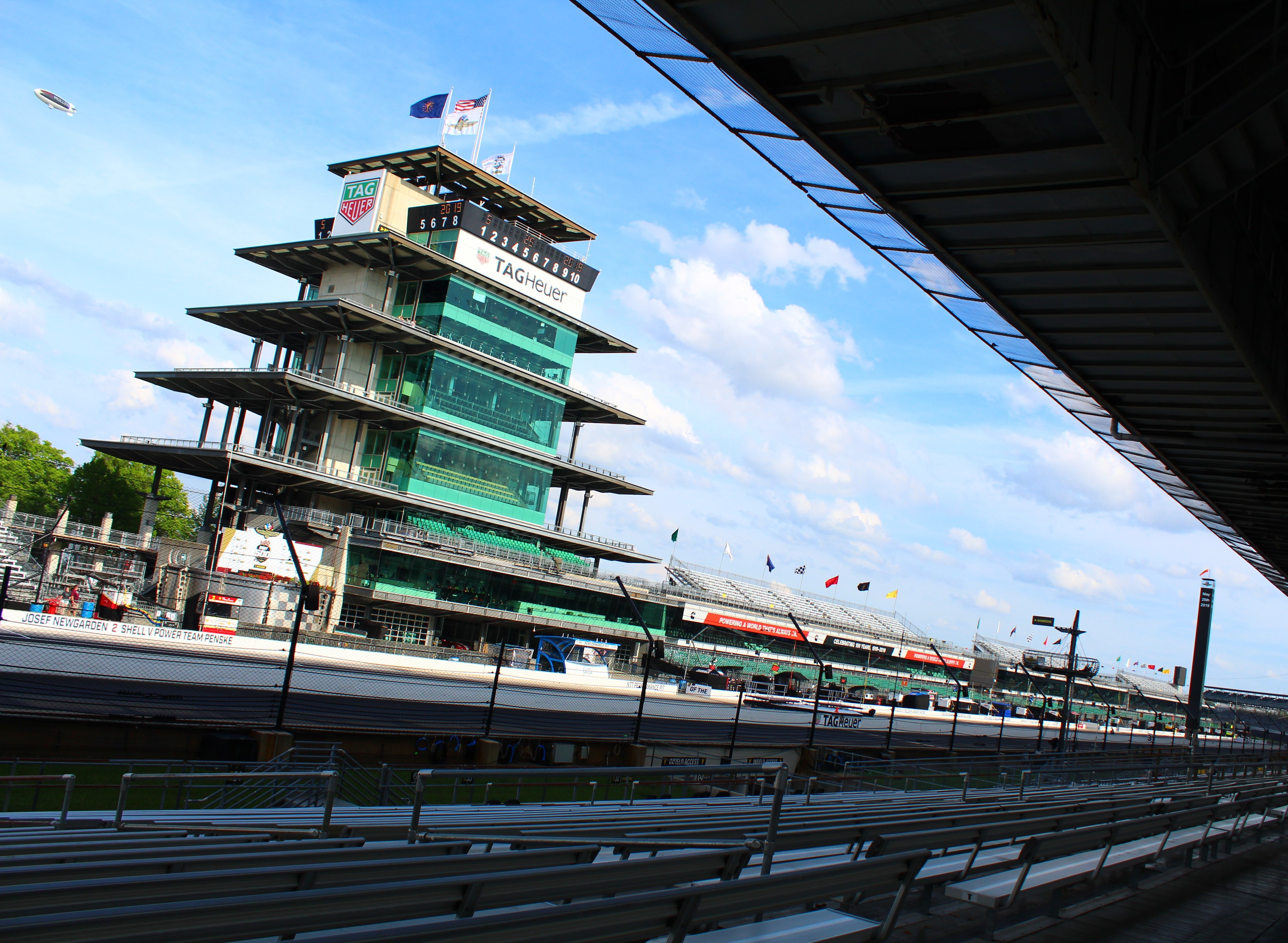
The Pagoda, the control tower, which houses officials, broadcasting, and hospitality suites, is an icon at the Indianapolis Motor Speedway.

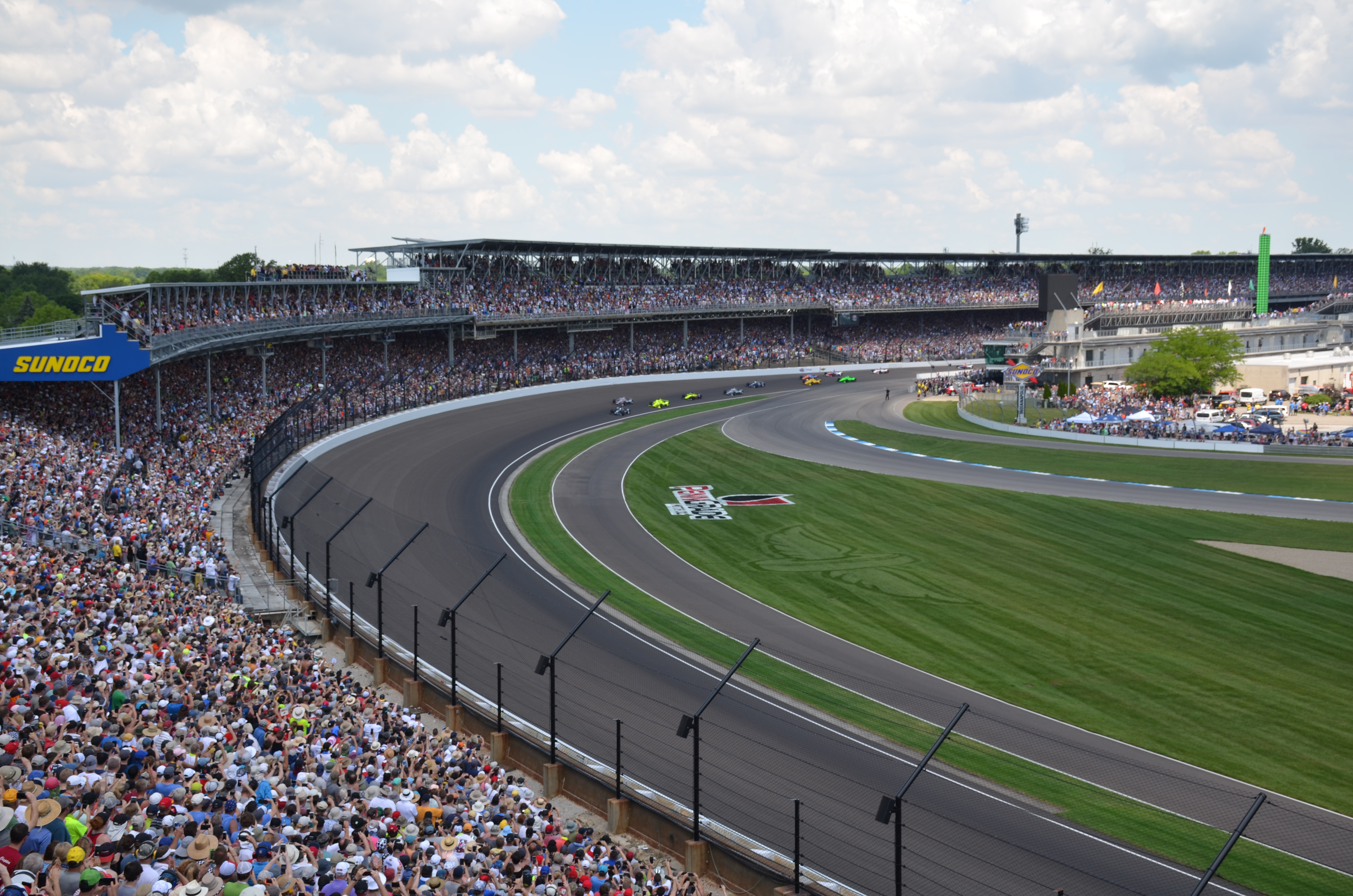
Turn one at the Indianapolis Motor Speedway.

The Indianapolis 500, commonly called the Indy 500, is held at the Indianapolis Motor Speedway, a 2.5-mile (4.02 km) paved oval. It is a points-paying race of the NTT IndyCar Series. The event is contested by "Indy cars", a formula of professional-level, single-seat, open cockpit, open-wheel, purpose-built race cars. The race is the most prestigious event of the IndyCar calendar, and one of the oldest and most important automobile races in the world.

=== Rule changes ===
- Plans to debut a brand new 2.4-L displacement hybrid engine formula for 2024 were scrapped in late 2022. An amended plan was proposed to modify the existing 2.2L twin-turbocharged V6 engines with an energy recovery system. This innovative hybrid assist system was scheduled to debut at St. Petersburg on March 10. However, on December 7, 2023, IndyCar announced that its introduction would be delayed until after the Indianapolis 500.
- Car weight will be reduced by approximately 30 pounds (14 kg) due to the integration of new lightweight parts and components, and all cars will be required to use new, stronger rear suspension uprights for all oval events. The new suspension parts were introduced in response to an incident during the 2023 race in which a wheel assembly broke free from Kyle Kirkwood's car and was launched over the catch fencing.
- Cars are allowed 9° of inclination on the rear wing, up from 5° previously, and Gurney flaps have been deleted from the trailing edge of the underwing flaps. Trimmed sidewalls at the exit of diffusers have been banned; full-width sidewalls are now required. Lastly, inner bargeboards have been banned while outer bargeboards are still permitted.
- Drivers will be prohibited from going below the white line in "breaking the draft" moves that extends from the exit of turn four to the pit attenuator on the mainstretch. The move, commonly seen at NASCAR, and in the past, INDYCAR races most notably at Pocono Raceway, occurs at Indianapolis in both series where drivers deliberately veer on straights in order to defend from other cars drafting and making slingshot passes. In the 2022 and 2023 races, drivers have increasingly been overtly aggressive in breaking the draft, using the apron at the exit of Turn 2 and Turn 4 (which also serves as Turn 1 of the car road course and Turn 16 of the motorcycle configuration), perilously close to the pit attenuator in blocking. This practice is now prohibited.
- Each entry was permitted 37 sets of tires for the entirety of the event. The total was increased from 34 to 37 after the second day of the Open Test was rained out.

==== Track improvements ====
- 1,700 feet of catchfence was installed along the inside of turn three.
- 800 feet of new SAFER barrier was installed along the inside of turn four
- 85 feet of new SAFER barrier was installed along the inside of the north short chute, replacing old Armco-style guardrail.
- All existing SAFER barriers was upgraded with new foam.
- The Indianapolis Motor Speedway Museum closed in November 2023 for substantial renovations. It reopened in 2025 after a $89 million renovation and modernization project.

=== Sponsorship ===
On May 25, 2022, it was announced that online financial services company Gainbridge reached a multiyear agreement to extend their presenting sponsorship of the Indianapolis 500. The extension was for an undisclosed length. This will be the second year under the current deal. Gainbridge originally signed a four-year deal which was in place from 2019 to 2022.

=== 2024 IndyCar Series ===
The 2024 Indianapolis 500 was the fifth points-paying race (and sixth overall) of the 2024 NTT IndyCar Series season. Five different drivers won the first five point-paying races. Josef Newgarden initially won the season opener at St. Petersburg, but on April 24 he was disqualified for violating push-to-pass parameters. Pato O'Ward was declared the winner. Álex Palou won the non-points event at the Thermal Club, Scott Dixon won at Long Beach and Scott McLaughlin won at Alabama. Álex Palou won the Sonsio Grand Prix on the Indianapolis Motor Speedway road course and led the championship points standings going into the Indy 500.

After an internal investigation in the aftermath of the aforementioned push-to-pass violations, Team Penske suspended four team members for both the Sonsio Grand Prix and the Indianapolis 500. The four members were: team president Tim Cindric (race strategist for Josef Newgarden), managing director Ron Ruzewski, Luke Mason (race engineer for Josef Newgarden), and Senior Data Engineer Robbie Atkinson (data specialist for Will Power).

== Race schedules ==
The 2024 IndyCar Series schedule was announced on September 25, 2023, with the Indianapolis 500 scheduled for Sunday, May 26, 2024. Practice, time trials, and other ancillary events are scheduled for the two weeks leading up to the race. The Speedway hosted an eclipse-viewing event on April 8 in conjunction with Purdue University, followed by the annual Open Test held on April 10–11. The test days included additional rookie orientation sessions and refresher tests as needed. The Sonsio Grand Prix, including the Indy NXT and other USF Pro (formerly the "Road to Indy") races, served as the opening weekend of track activity on May 10–11.

Race schedule — April 2024
| Sun | Mon | Tue | Wed | Thu | Fri | Sat |
|---|---|---|---|---|---|---|
| 7 | 8 | 9 | 10; Open test | 11; Open test | 12 | 13 |
Race schedule — May 2024
| | | | 1 | 2 | 3 | 4 Mini-Marathon |
| 5 | 6 | 7 | 8 | 9 USF Pro testing | 10; USF, NXT Race; IndyCar Qual. | 11; Grand Prix (USF, NXT, NICS) |
| 12 | 13 | 14; Practice | 15; Practice | 16; Practice | 17; Fast Friday | 18; Time Trials (13–30) |
| 19; Time Trials (1–12, 31–33) | 20; Practice | 21 | 22 | 23 | 24; Carb Day | 25; Parade |
| 26; Indianapolis 500 | 27; Memorial Day | 28 | 29 | 30 | 31 | |

| Color | Notes |
|---|---|
| Green | Practice |
| Blue | Time trials |
| Silver | Race day |
| Red | Rained out* |
| Blank | No track activity |

* Includes days where track
activity was significantly limited due to rain

Source: 2024 Indianapolis 500 Event Schedule

== Entry list ==
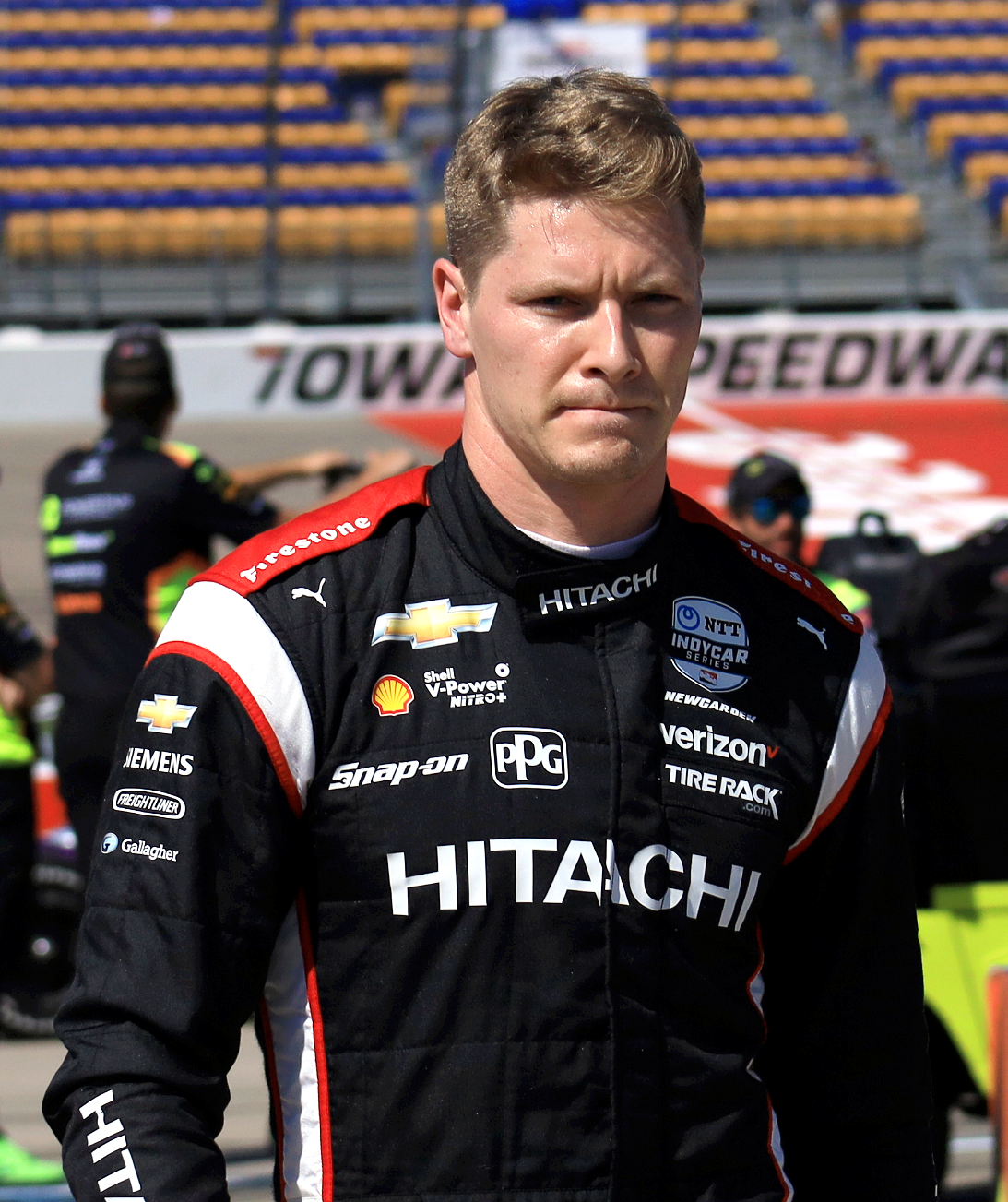
Josef Newgarden entered as the defending race winner.

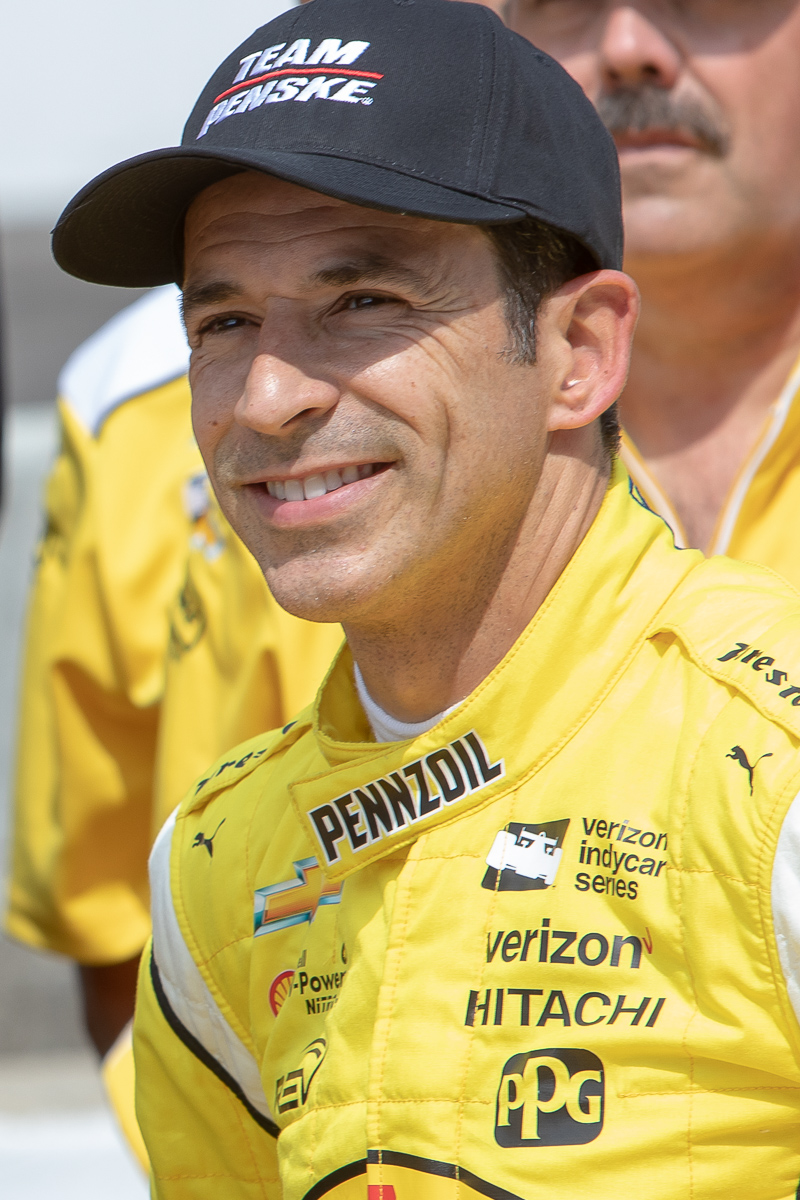
Four-time race winner Hélio Castroneves (2001, 2002, 2009, 2021) had the most previous starts in the field with 23.

All entries utilized a spec Dallara IR18 chassis with universal aero kit and 2020-adopted aeroscreen. Honda (HRC) and Chevrolet (Ilmor) are the current engine providers. Firestone was the exclusive tire supplier. There were 34 confirmed entries for the race, including eight former winners and seven race rookies. A tentative 35th entry by Abel Motorsports (R. C. Enerson) was withdrawn on May 3.

Four-time race winner Hélio Castroneves entered for the 24th time (all consecutive), the most of any active driver. 2019 winner Simon Pagenaud did not participate, as he was still recovering from injuries suffered in a crash at Mid-Ohio in July 2023. 2021 NASCAR Cup Series champion Kyle Larson entered with a view to becoming the fifth driver to complete "Double Duty", racing the Indianapolis 500 and Coca-Cola 600 in the same day. Former winner Tony Kanaan retired after the 2023 race, but was named a potential replacement in the No. 17 should a conflict arise which would preclude Larson's participation in the 500.

Callum Ilott substituted for the injured David Malukas in the No. 6 Arrow McLaren entry during the April Open test. Ilott later replaced Malukas entirely for the 500 after Malukas was released from the McLaren team in late April.

The official entry list was released on May 13.

| No. | Driver | Team | Engine | Ref. |
|---|---|---|---|---|
| 2 | (United States) Josef Newgarden W | Team Penske | Chevrolet | |
| 3 | (New Zealand) Scott McLaughlin | Team Penske | Chevrolet | |
| 4 | (Cayman Islands) Kyffin Simpson R | Chip Ganassi Racing | Honda | |
| 5 | (Mexico) Pato O'Ward | Arrow McLaren | Chevrolet | |
| 6 | (United Kingdom) Callum Ilott | Arrow McLaren | Chevrolet | |
| 06 | (Brazil) Hélio Castroneves W | Meyer Shank Racing with Curb-Agajanian | Honda | |
| 7 | (United States) Alexander Rossi W | Arrow McLaren | Chevrolet | |
| 8 | (Sweden) Linus Lundqvist R | Chip Ganassi Racing | Honda | |
| 9 | (New Zealand) Scott Dixon W | Chip Ganassi Racing | Honda | |
| 10 | (Spain) Álex Palou | Chip Ganassi Racing | Honda | |
| 11 | (New Zealand) Marcus Armstrong R | Chip Ganassi Racing | Honda | |
| 12 | (Australia) Will Power W | Team Penske | Chevrolet | |
| 14 | (United States) Santino Ferrucci | A. J. Foyt Enterprises | Chevrolet | |
| 15 | (United States) Graham Rahal | Rahal Letterman Lanigan Racing | Honda | |
| 17 | (United States) Kyle Larson R | Arrow McLaren/Rick Hendrick | Chevrolet | |
| 18 | (United States) Nolan Siegel R | Dale Coyne Racing | Honda | |
| 20 | (United States) Ed Carpenter | Ed Carpenter Racing | Chevrolet | |
| 21 | (Netherlands) Rinus VeeKay | Ed Carpenter Racing | Chevrolet | |
| 23 | (United States) Ryan Hunter-Reay W | DRR-Cusick Motorsports | Chevrolet | |
| 24 | (United States) Conor Daly | DRR-Cusick Motorsports | Chevrolet | |
| 26 | (United States) Colton Herta | Andretti Global with Curb-Agajanian | Honda | |
| 27 | (United States) Kyle Kirkwood | Andretti Global | Honda | |
| 28 | (Sweden) Marcus Ericsson W | Andretti Global | Honda | |
| 30 | (Brazil) Pietro Fittipaldi | Rahal Letterman Lanigan Racing | Honda | |
| 33 | (Denmark) Christian Rasmussen R | Ed Carpenter Racing | Chevrolet | |
| 41 | (United States) Sting Ray Robb | A. J. Foyt Enterprises | Chevrolet | |
| 45 | (Denmark) Christian Lundgaard | Rahal Letterman Lanigan Racing | Honda | |
| 51 | (United Kingdom) Katherine Legge | Dale Coyne Racing with RWR | Honda | |
| 60 | (Sweden) Felix Rosenqvist | Meyer Shank Racing | Honda | |
| 66 | (United Kingdom) Tom Blomqvist R | Meyer Shank Racing | Honda | |
| 75 | (Japan) Takuma Sato W | Rahal Letterman Lanigan Racing | Honda | |
| 77 | (France) Romain Grosjean | Juncos Hollinger Racing | Chevrolet | |
| 78 | (Argentina) Agustín Canapino | Juncos Hollinger Racing | Chevrolet | |
| 98 | (United States) Marco Andretti | Andretti Herta with Marco and Curb-Agajanian | Honda | |

- W Former Indianapolis 500 winner
- R Indianapolis 500 rookie

== Testing and Rookie Orientation ==
Rookie rules for the Indianapolis 500 include the mandate that a driver pass a supervised high-speed oval test before he/she is allowed to participate in the official Rookie Orientation Program (ROP) at the Indianapolis Motor Speedway. Approved venues for the initial high-speed oval track test include Texas Motor Speedway, Homestead–Miami Speedway, and a few other select venues.

The Rookie Orientation Program at Indianapolis consists of three phases. For phase 1, each driver was required to complete ten laps between 205–210 mph (330–338 km/h), while demonstrating satisfactory car control, proper racing line, and safe interaction with other cars on the circuit. The laps do not have to be consecutive. Phase 2 was fifteen laps between 210–215 mph (338–346 km/h), and phase 3 was fifteen laps over 215 mph (346 km/h). Veteran drivers that have not competed in an IndyCar oval race since the previous year's Indy 500 are required to take a refresher test. The refresher test consists of phase 2 and phase 3 of the aforementioned rookie test.

=== Rookie Orientation – October 2023 ===
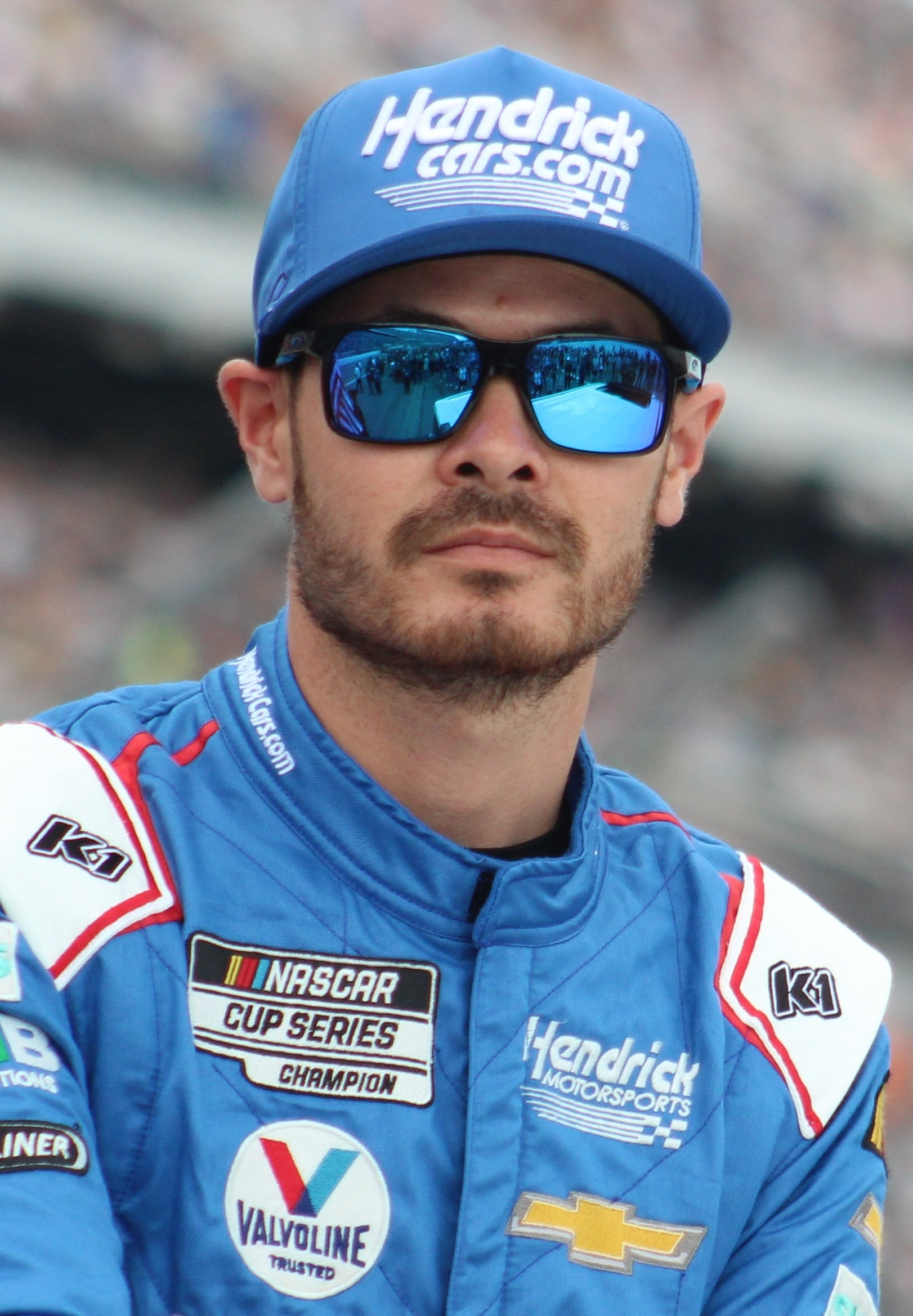
Kyle Larson completed Rookie Orientation on October 12.

The Rookie Orientation Program was held October 11–12, 2023. Four drivers were scheduled to participate: Marcus Armstrong, Linus Lundqvist, Tom Blomqvist and 2021 NASCAR Cup Series champion Kyle Larson. Armstrong, Lundqvist, and Blomqvist had each participated the previous month in high-speed oval rookie test at Texas, which gave them eligibility to participate. Rookie Kyffin Simpson was ineligible to participate, having yet to complete the Texas test. The officials ruled that Larson exempt from the Texas test due to his extensive experience on high-speed ovals in NASCAR competition.

Armstrong, Lundqvist, and Blomqvist each passed all three phases of the rookie test on Wednesday. The three drivers completed a total of 285 laps without major incident. Lundqvist reportedly suffered some mechanical problems, but was able to return to the track and finish his test. Larson, who is preparing to do "Double Duty", arrived and completed his test on Thursday. Larson took his first ever laps in an Indy car, logging a total of 72 laps without incident.

Top speeds
| Pos | No. | Driver | Team | Engine | Speed (mph) | Speed (km/h) |
|---|---|---|---|---|---|---|
| 1 | 60 | (United Kingdom) Tom Blomqvist R | Meyer Shank Racing | Honda | 220.176 | 354.339 |
| 2 | 20 | (Sweden) Linus Lundqvist R | Chip Ganassi Racing | Honda | 219.504 | 353.257 |
| 3 | 11 | (New Zealand) Marcus Armstrong R | Chip Ganassi Racing | Honda | 219.252 | 352.852 |
| 4 | 6 | (United States) Kyle Larson R | Arrow McLaren | Chevrolet | 217.898 | 350.673 |
Official Report

=== Hybrid testing – October 2023 ===
A private offseason test was held October 12–13, 2023 for hybrid energy recovery system testing. Two Honda teams, Andretti Global (Colton Herta & Marcus Ericsson) and Chip Ganassi Racing (Álex Palou) and two Chevrolet teams, Arrow McLaren (Alexander Rossi & David Malukas) and Team Penske (Will Power) participated. The six drivers completed a total of 1,325 laps with no incidents reported.

=== Oval evaluation testing (Phoenix) – February 2024 ===
Race rookie Kyle Larson conducted an oval evaluation test with Arrow McLaren at Phoenix Raceway on February 5. It was Larson's first time driving an Indy car since he participated in rookie orientation the previous October. Larson completed 172 laps without major incident. During his final stint, Larson reported that he nearly spun out in turn one, but was able to regain control of the car.

=== Rookie oval test (Texas) – March 2024 ===
The series hosted a high-speed oval rookie evaluation test at Texas Motor Speedway on March 27. Three drivers participated: Kyffin Simpson, Christian Rasmussen, and Nolan Siegel. Veteran drivers Ed Carpenter and Álex Palou were also there in compliance with Series rules to shake down their team cars and establish a base setup. Rasmussen completed 134 laps, Simpson completed 202 laps, and Siegel completed 146 laps. All three drivers completed their evaluations and were approved to take the Rookie Orientation Program at the April Open Test at Indianapolis.

=== Open Test Day 1 — Wednesday April 10, 2024 ===
- Weather: 60 °F (16 °C); cloudy early, rain in the afternoon.
- Summary: The first day of the Open Test was scheduled for 9:00 a.m. to 6:30 p.m. The day began with Install laps, followed by veteran testing from 9:05 a.m. to 11 a.m. Josef Newgarden turned the fastest lap during the morning session, running a lap at 228.811 mph (368.236 km/h). Rookie Kyle Larson was second fastest in the session at 226.384 mph (364.330 km/h). The session was ended a few minutes early due to light rain.

The track was reserved for Rookie and Refresher tests from 11 a.m. to 1 p.m. Kyffin Simpson, Nolan Siegel, and Christian Rasmussen all successfully completed their rookie orientation tests, while Marco Andretti, Katherine Legge, and Pietro Fittipaldi completed their veteran refresher tests.

The remainder of the day was scheduled to be available for all cars. Rain began falling only a few minutes into the session and intensified through the afternoon, leading officials to end the session early due to the weather just past 4:00 p.m. Colton Herta was fastest during the few laps turned in the afternoon session, running a lap at 225.907 mph (363.562 km/h).

Top speeds
| Pos | No. | Driver | Team | Engine | Speed (mph) | Speed (km/h) |
|---|---|---|---|---|---|---|
| 1 | 2 | (United States) Josef Newgarden W | Team Penske | Chevrolet | 228.811 | 368.236 |
| 2 | 17 | (United States) Kyle Larson R | Arrow McLaren/Rick Hendrick | Chevrolet | 226.384 | 364.330 |
| 3 | 9 | (New Zealand) Scott Dixon W | Chip Ganassi Racing | Honda | 226.346 | 364.269 |
Official Report

=== Open Test Day 2 — Thursday April 11, 2024 ===
- Weather: 59 °F (15 °C); rain.

The second scheduled day of the Open Test was canceled due to rainfall throughout the day.

== Practice ==
=== Opening Day — Tuesday May 14 ===
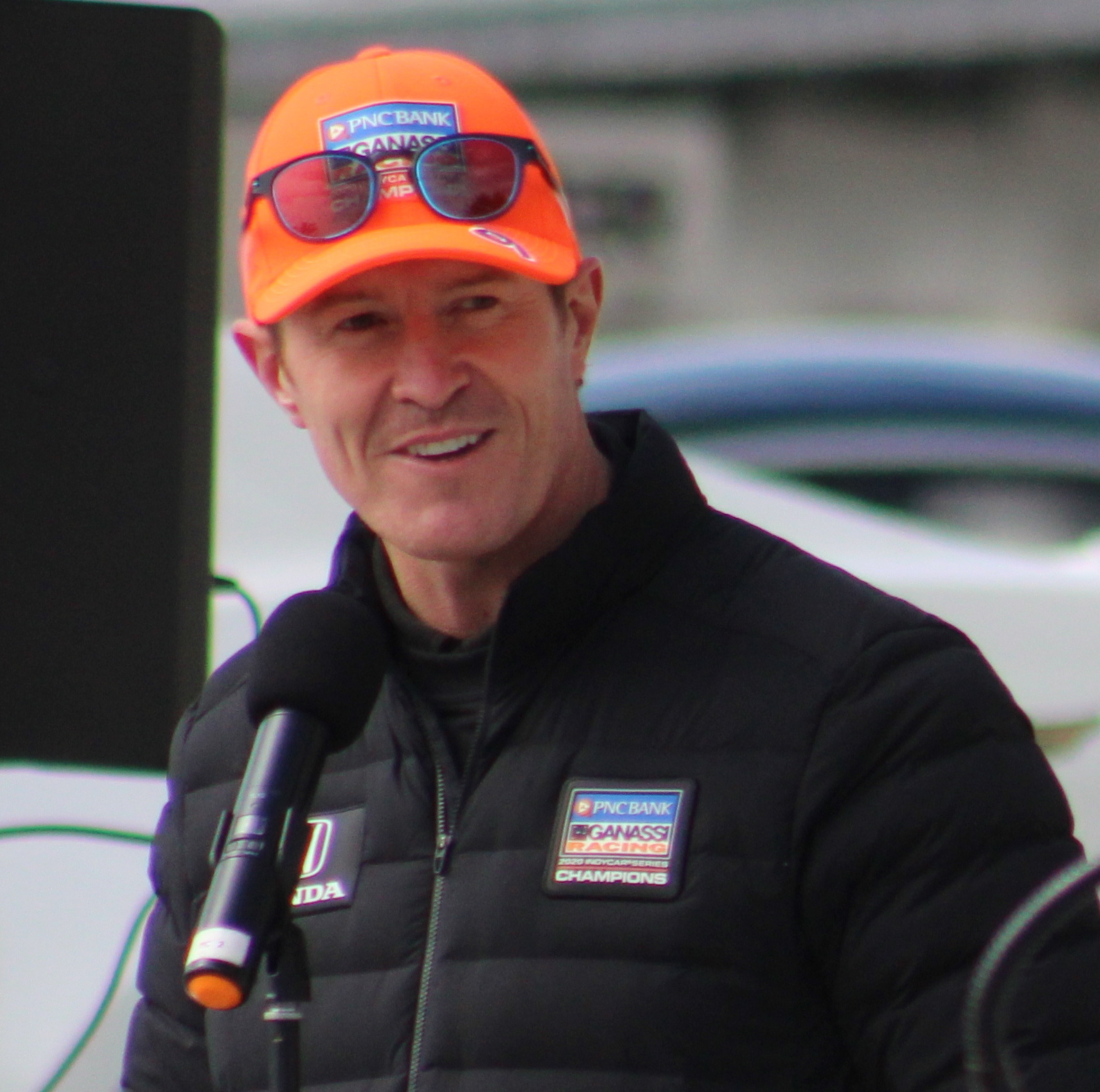
Scott Dixon was fastest on the opening day of practice.

- Weather: 64 °F (18 °C), Rain
- Summary: The opening day of practice saw the track open at 9:00 a.m. and was scheduled to last until 6:00 p.m. However, rain began falling after only 23 minutes, ending running for the day. Scott Dixon was fastest in the brief session, running a lap at 229.107 mph (368.712 km/h). A total of 31 of the 34 entries managed to take laps, but at least five were limited to running "install" laps only. No incidents were reported.

Top speeds
| Pos | No. | Driver | Team | Engine | Speed (mph) | Speed (km/h) |
|---|---|---|---|---|---|---|
| 1 | 9 | (New Zealand) Scott Dixon | Chip Ganassi Racing | Honda | 229.107 | 368.712 |
| 2 | 98 | (United States) Marco Andretti | Andretti Herta Autosport w/ Marco Andretti & Curb-Agajanian | Honda | 228.399 | 367.573 |
| 3 | 75 | (Japan) Takuma Sato | Rahal Letterman Lanigan Racing | Honda | 225.551 | 362.989 |
Official Report

=== Wednesday May 15 ===
- Weather: 73 °F (23 °C), Light rain in the morning and early afternoon, Mostly cloudy with occasional light rain in the late afternoon
- Summary: With the previous day's practice being weather-shortened, officials extended track time, with the track scheduled to open at 10:00 a.m. and closing at 7:00 p.m. Rain in the morning and early afternoon, however, delayed the session again. The track was finally dried and opened for practice at 3:06 p.m. Brief rain showers brought occasional halts to the session before more sustained rain at roughly 6:00 p.m. effectively ended proceedings. Officials called the session at 6:55 p.m. with no additional laps turned. Drivers had roughly two hours total of green-flag running during the day and combined turned 2,084 laps. Scott McLaughlin was fastest during Wednesday practice, running a lap at 229.493 mph (369.333 km/h). Takuma Sato ran the fastest "no-tow" lap – a lap run without the assistance of aerodynamic drafting – at 221.219 mph (356.017 km/h). There were no incidents reported during the day.

Top speeds
| Pos | No. | Driver | Team | Engine | Speed (mph) | Speed (km/h) |
|---|---|---|---|---|---|---|
| 1 | 3 | (New Zealand) Scott McLaughlin | Team Penske | Chevrolet | 229.493 | 369.333 |
| 2 | 12 | (Australia) Will Power | Team Penske | Chevrolet | 228.767 | 368.165 |
| 3 | 26 | (United States) Colton Herta | Andretti Global w/ Curb-Agajanian | Honda | 227.858 | 366.702 |
Official Report

=== Thursday May 16 ===
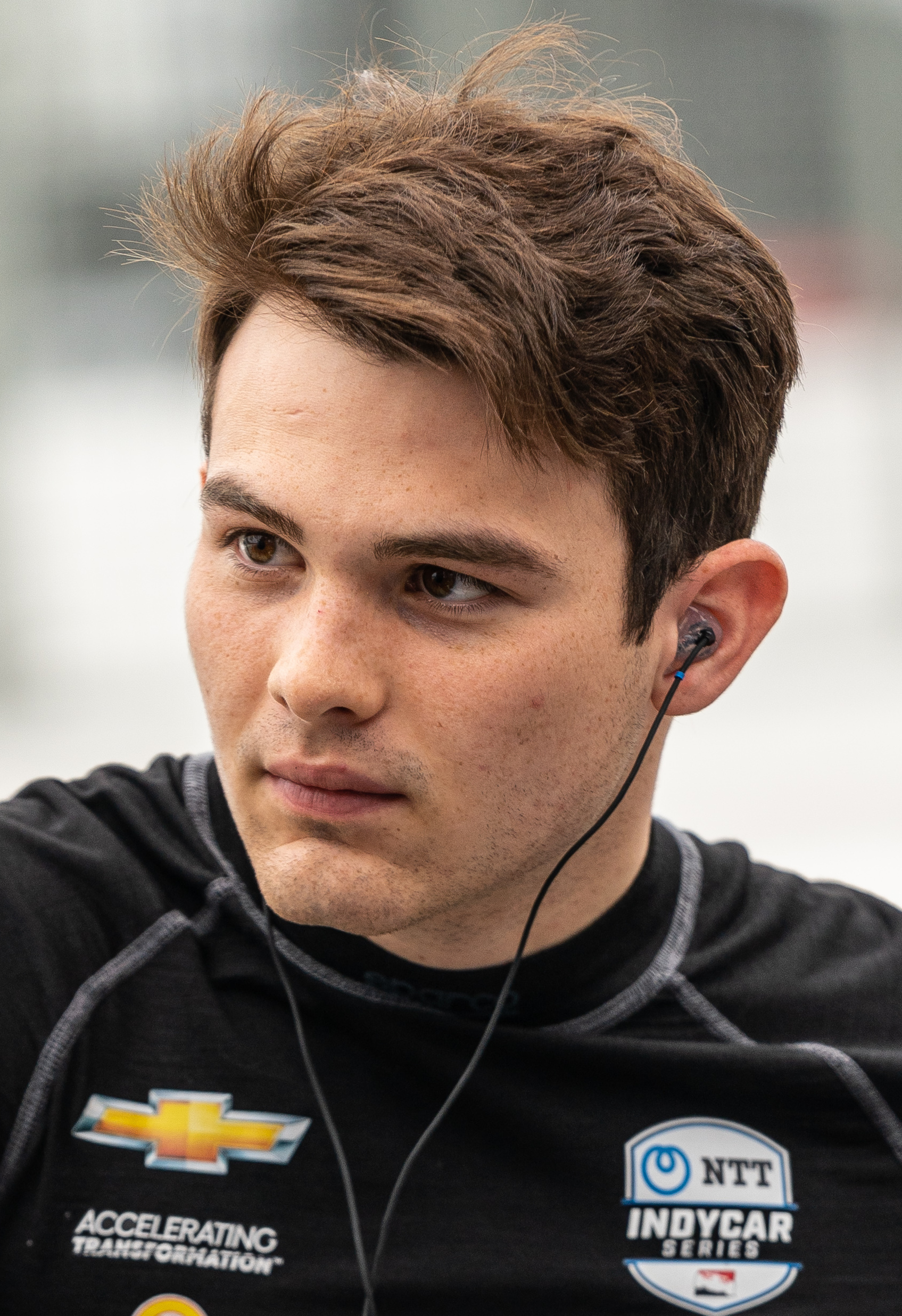
Pato O'Ward was fastest on Thursday.

- Weather: 74 °F (23 °C), Mostly cloudy with occasional light rain in the late afternoon
- Summary: Thursday practice was held from 10:00 a.m. to 6:00 p.m. Overnight, the Arrow McLaren team elected to change the engine in Kyle Larson's car after issues the day before. The first major incident of the month occurred at 11:29 a.m. when Linus Lundqvist lost control of his car in turn 2 and impacted the outside wall with the right-rear of his car. Lundqvist was uninjured in the accident. Alexander Rossi suffered mechanical issues during the morning, stalling on pit lane with apparent driveline issues. At 3:49 p.m., the second major incident of the day occurred when Marcus Ericsson lost control of his car in turn 4 and heavily impacted the outside wall. He slid across the track, making contact with the inside wall, then the pit attenuator before coming to a halt at the entrance to pit lane. Ericsson was also uninjured. Just before 4:30 p.m., light rain began falling, delaying running for roughly an hour. The track was dried and reopened to running with 25 minutes remaining in the session, but was halted again when Conor Daly slowed on track with suspension issues with his car. More light rain began to fall soon after, and no further running occurred before time expired on the day. Pato O'Ward was the fastest driver during Thursday practice, running a lap at 228.861 mph (368.316 km/h). Colton Herta ran the fastest "no-tow" lap at 224.182 mph (360.786 km/h).

Top speeds
| Pos | No. | Driver | Team | Engine | Speed (mph) | Speed (km/h) |
|---|---|---|---|---|---|---|
| 1 | 5 | (Mexico) Pato O'Ward | Arrow McLaren | Chevrolet | 228.861 | 368.316 |
| 2 | 3 | (New Zealand) Scott McLaughlin | Team Penske | Chevrolet | 227.316 | 365.830 |
| 3 | 10 | (Spain) Álex Palou | Chip Ganassi Racing | Honda | 226.915 | 365.184 |
Official Report

=== Fast Friday — Friday May 17 ===
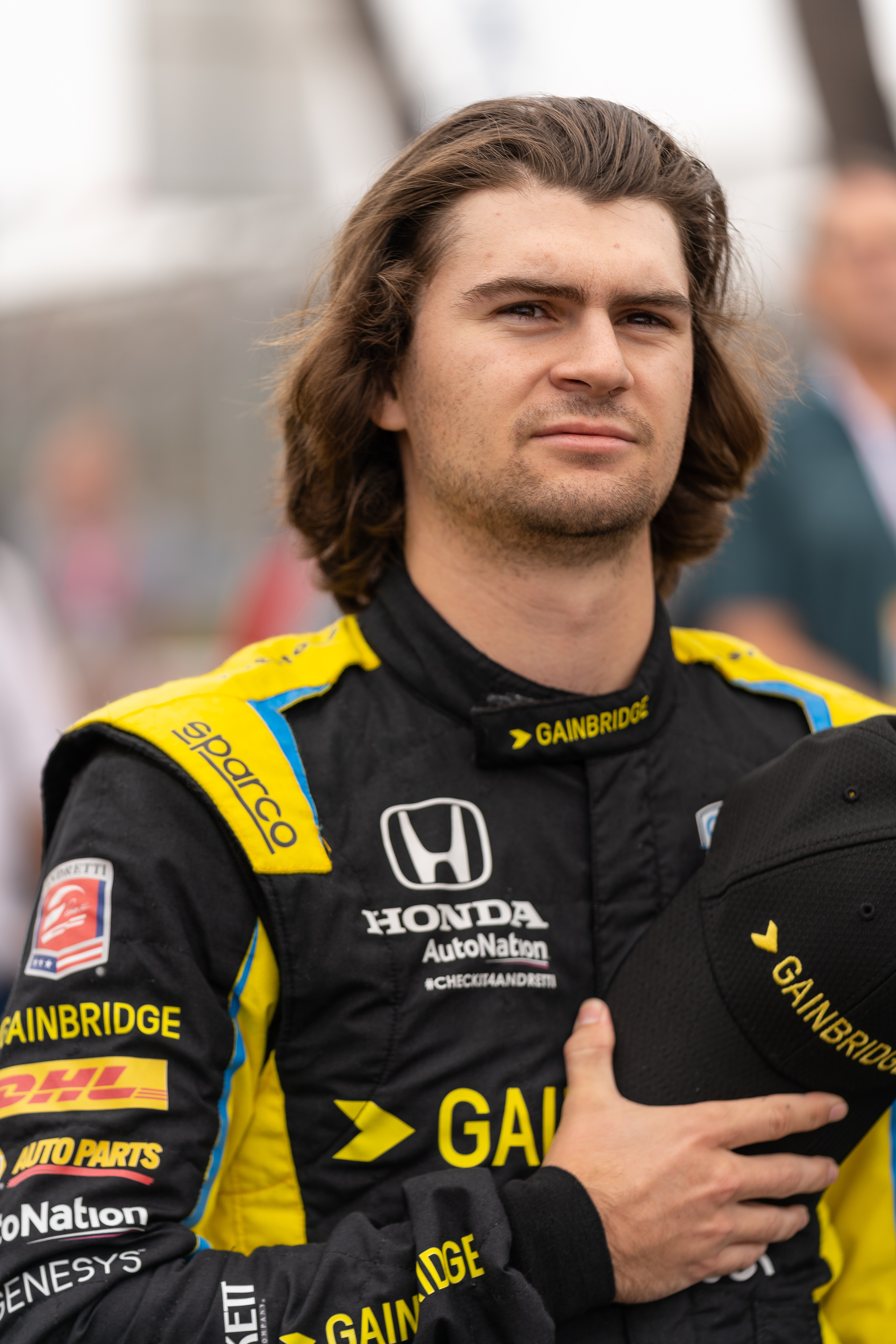
Colton Herta had the fastest lap on Fast Friday.

- Weather: 73 °F (23 °C), Mostly cloudy
- Summary: Friday practice was held from 12:00 p.m. to 6:00 p.m. Teams were allowed to increase their turbocharger boost levels to qualifying levels, resulting in higher speeds. Most of the day was spent by teams practicing qualifying runs for the following day. At 1:38 p.m., rookie Nolan Siegel suffered an incident after losing control of his car in turn 2 and impacting the outside wall. As Siegel's car slid after the impact, the rear of the car lifted off the ground and flipped the car over, with the car coming to a rest still upside down. Siegel was uninjured in the accident. At 3:16 p.m., Álex Palou suffered an apparent engine issue, which brought a brief stoppage in running while safety crews cleaned fluid dropped from his ailing car. Colton Herta was fastest during the session, running a lap at 234.974 mph (378.154 km/h). Josef Newgarden ran the fastest "no-tow" lap of the day at 234.260 mph (377.005 km/h), which was fast enough for third fastest lap overall on the day. Newgarden also ran the fastest 4-lap average – a simulation of a qualifying run for the race – at 234.063 mph (376.688 km/h).

Following practice, the random draw to determine qualifying order was conducted.

Top speeds
| Pos | No. | Driver | Team | Engine | Speed (mph) | Speed (km/h) |
|---|---|---|---|---|---|---|
| 1 | 26 | (United States) Colton Herta | Andretti Global w/ Curb-Agajanian | Honda | 234.974 | 378.154 |
| 2 | 17 | (United States) Kyle Larson R | Arrow McLaren/Rick Hendrick | Chevrolet | 234.271 | 377.023 |
| 3 | 2 | (United States) Josef Newgarden | Team Penske | Chevrolet | 234.260 | 377.005 |
Official Report

== Time trials ==
=== Saturday, May 18 ===
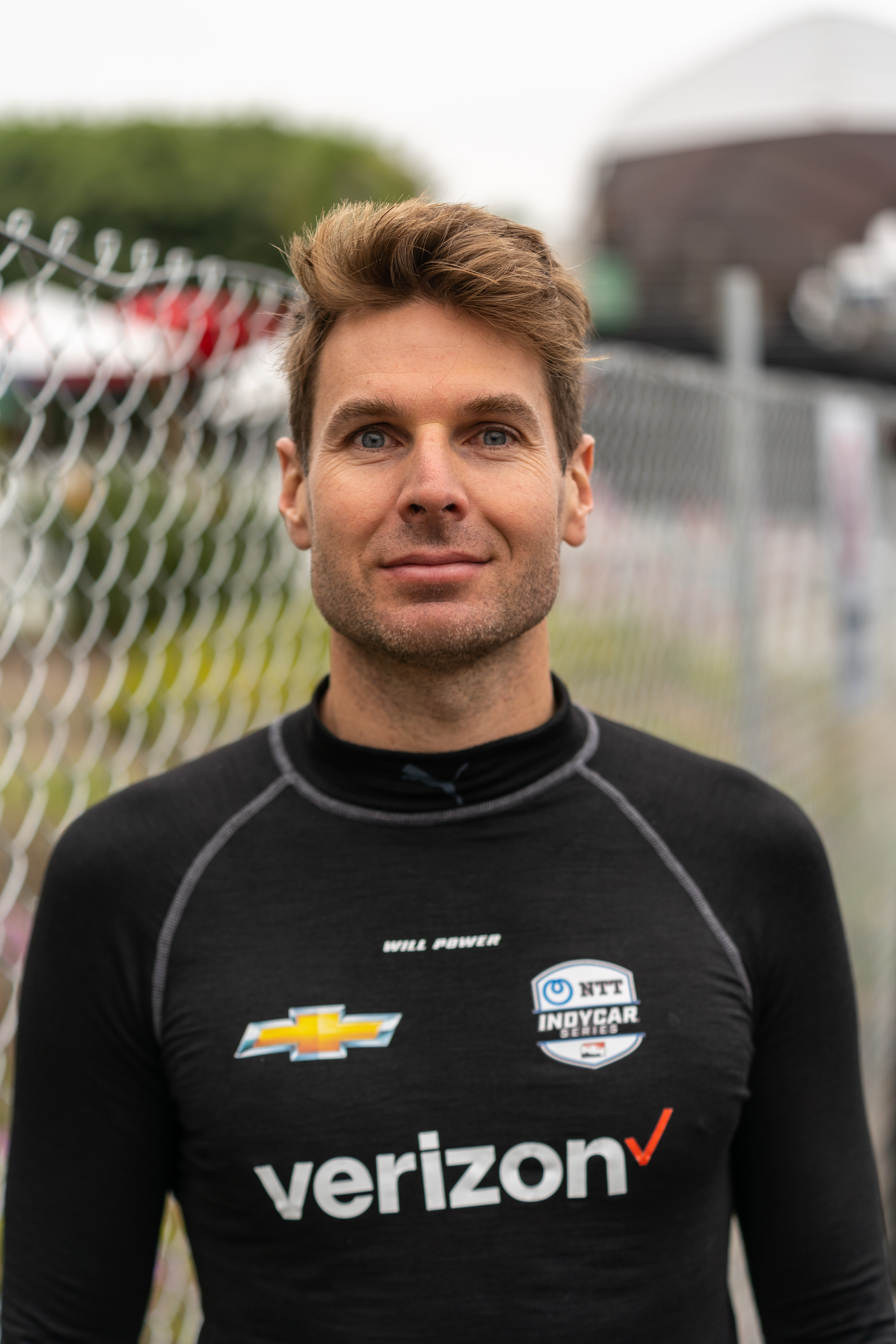
Will Power was fastest in Saturday qualifying.

- Weather: 79 °F (26 °C), Partly cloudy
- Summary: The first day of qualifying was scheduled from 11:00 a.m. to 5:50 p.m. Cars qualifying 1st–12th advanced to the Top 12 Qualifying session on Sunday. Cars qualifying in positions 13th–30th were locked-in to those positions. Cars qualifying 31st–34th moved on to take part in the Last Chance Qualifying session on Sunday to determine the final row of the starting grid. All entered cars were eligible for guaranteed attempt on Saturday, then unlimited additional attempts were permitted, time-permitting, until 5:50 p.m.

Team Penske dominated the day, with their cars taking the top three spots. Will Power ran the fastest four-lap average of the trio at 233.758 mph (376.197 km/h). Chevrolet-powered cars occupied the majority of the "Top 12", with nine cars advancing to Sunday's qualifying. Rinus VeeKay suffered an accident during his first qualifying attempt, after losing control of his car in turn 3 and impacting the outside wall. His Ed Carpenter Racing team was able to repair the car and he completed a qualifying attempt later in the day (he ranked 29th). However, in a surprise move, with 8 minutes left in the day, VeeKay withdrew his time. He bumped his way into the "Top 12" with a speed of 232.419 mph (374.042 km/h).

With only the top 30 cars locked in during Saturday qualifying, the slowest four qualifiers would need to qualify again on Sunday in the Last Chance Qualifying session. For the second year in a row, Graham Rahal was too slow to make the top 30 and would participate in the Last Chance session. Also relegated to Last Chance Qualifying were Katherine Legge, former 500 winner Marcus Ericsson, and rookie Nolan Siegel, the latter two of which had suffered accidents during pre-qualifying practice sessions.

Though the Chevrolet-powered cars appeared to have better performance than the Hondas, several of the Chevrolet entries suffered engine issues. Arrow McLaren drivers Pato O'Ward and Kyle Larson both suffered a sudden loss of power from their engines during their first attempts, though both successfully completed runs later in the day. During late afternoon running, Conor Daly, Agustín Canapino, Ed Carpenter and Christian Rasmussen all aborted attempts to improve qualifying times after suffering similar losses of power. Representatives from Chevrolet explained after the session that the loss of power was a result of fuel in the plenum burning off in some cases upon drivers shifting down gears, causing the fuel-air charge in the chamber to evaporate and causing a temporary engine shut-off.

| Pos | No. | Driver | Team | Engine | Speed (mph) | Speed (km/h) |
Top 12 qualifiers – Participate in Sunday Rounds
| 1 | 12 | (Australia) Will Power W | Team Penske | Chevrolet | 233.758 | 376.197 |
| 2 | 3 | (New Zealand) Scott McLaughlin | Team Penske | Chevrolet | 233.332 | 375.511 |
| 3 | 2 | (United States) Josef Newgarden W | Team Penske | Chevrolet | 233.293 | 375.449 |
| 4 | 7 | (United States) Alexander Rossi W | Arrow McLaren | Chevrolet | 233.069 | 375.088 |
| 5 | 27 | (United States) Kyle Kirkwood | Andretti Global | Honda | 232.764 | 374.597 |
| 6 | 17 | (United States) Kyle Larson R | Arrow McLaren/Hendrick Motorsports | Chevrolet | 232.563 | 374.274 |
| 7 | 60 | (Sweden) Felix Rosenqvist | Meyer Shank Racing | Honda | 232.547 | 374.248 |
| 8 | 14 | (United States) Santino Ferrucci | A. J. Foyt Racing | Chevrolet | 232.496 | 374.166 |
| 9 | 75 | (Japan) Takuma Sato W | Rahal Letterman Lanigan Racing | Honda | 232.473 | 374.129 |
| 10 | 5 | (Mexico) Pato O'Ward | Arrow McLaren | Chevrolet | 232.434 | 374.066 |
| 11 | 21 | (Netherlands) Rinus VeeKay | Ed Carpenter Racing | Chevrolet | 232.419 | 374.042 |
| 12 | 23 | (United States) Ryan Hunter-Reay W | Dreyer & Reinbold Racing w/ Cusick Motorsports | Chevrolet | 232.385 | 373.987 |
Positions 13–30
| 13 | 26 | (United States) Colton Herta | Andretti Global w/ Curb-Agajanian | Honda | 232.316 | 373.876 |
| 14 | 10 | (Spain) Álex Palou | Chip Ganassi Racing | Honda | 232.306 | 373.860 |
| 15 | 6 | (United Kingdom) Callum Ilott | Arrow McLaren | Chevrolet | 232.230 | 373.738 |
| 16 | 11 | (New Zealand) Marcus Armstrong R | Chip Ganassi Racing | Honda | 232.183 | 373.662 |
| 17 | 20 | (United States) Ed Carpenter | Ed Carpenter Racing | Chevrolet | 232.017 | 373.395 |
| 18 | 4 | (Cayman Islands) Kyffin Simpson R | Chip Ganassi Racing | Honda | 231.948 | 373.284 |
| 19 | 98 | (United States) Marco Andretti | Andretti Herta Autosport w/ Marco Andretti & Curb-Agajanian | Honda | 231.890 | 373.191 |
| 20 | 06 | (Brazil) Hélio Castroneves W | Meyer Shank Racing w/ Curb-Agajanian | Chevrolet | 231.871 | 373.160 |
| 21 | 9 | (New Zealand) Scott Dixon W | Chip Ganassi Racing | Honda | 231.851 | 373.128 |
| 22 | 78 | (Argentina) Agustín Canapino | Juncos Hollinger Racing | Chevrolet | 231.847 | 373.122 |
| 23 | 41 | (United States) Sting Ray Robb | A. J. Foyt Racing | Chevrolet | 231.826 | 373.088 |
| 24 | 33 | (Denmark) Christian Rasmussen R | Ed Carpenter Racing | Chevrolet | 231.682 | 372.856 |
| 25 | 66 | (United Kingdom) Tom Blomqvist R | Meyer Shank Racing | Honda | 231.578 | 372.689 |
| 26 | 77 | (France) Romain Grosjean | Juncos Hollinger Racing | Chevrolet | 231.514 | 372.586 |
| 27 | 8 | (Sweden) Linus Lundqvist R | Chip Ganassi Racing | Honda | 231.506 | 372.573 |
| 28 | 45 | (Denmark) Christian Lundgaard | Rahal Letterman Lanigan Racing | Honda | 231.465 | 372.507 |
| 29 | 24 | (United States) Conor Daly | Dreyer & Reinbold Racing w/ Cusick Motorsports | Chevrolet | 231.243 | 372.150 |
| 30 | 30 | (Brazil) Pietro Fittipaldi | Rahal Letterman Lanigan Racing | Honda | 231.100 | 371.919 |
Did not qualify – Relegated to Last Chance Qualifiers
| 31 | 51 | (United Kingdom) Katherine Legge | Dale Coyne Racing w/ Rick Ware Racing | Honda | 230.830 | 371.485 |
| 32 | 28 | (Sweden) Marcus Ericsson W | Andretti Global | Honda | 230.765 | 371.380 |
| 33 | 15 | (United States) Graham Rahal | Rahal Letterman Lanigan Racing | Honda | 230.685 | 371.252 |
| 34 | 18 | (United States) Nolan Siegel R | Dale Coyne Racing | Honda | 228.841 | 368.284 |
Official Report

=== Sunday, May 19 ===
- Weather: 86 °F (30 °C), partly cloudy
- Summary: Sunday qualifications were divided into three sessions. The first session was the Top 12 qualifying session at 3:00 p.m., during which the top six qualifiers would advance to the Fast Six session later in the day, while positions 7–12 would be locked in place. The second session of the day was the Last Chance Qualifying session from 4:00 p.m. to 5:00 p.m., which would determine positions 31–33 and the one entry failing to qualify for the race. The final session of the day was the Fast Six session beginning at 5:15 p.m., which would set the top six starting positions.

A two-hour practice session was held from 12 p.m. to 2 p.m. The first hour was reserved for the "Top 12" participants, and the second hour was set aside for the "Last Chance" qualifiers. Josef Newgarden (234.052 mph) turned the fastest lap of the session. All eligible drivers took laps except for Rinus VeeKay. During the second hour, Graham Rahal reported a vibration while on a practice run, which turned out to be a loose lug nut. Rahal was able to keep the car under control, and drove back to the pits without incident. Katherine Legge (231.304 mph) was the quickest of the "Last Chance" drivers.

==== Top 12 qualifying ====
- Summary: Top 12 qualifying began at 3:00 p.m. Team Penske cars locked out the top three spots for the second consecutive session, with Scott McLaughlin qualifying fastest with an average of 233.492 mph (375.769 km/h). Will Power was second quickest, only 0.009 mph (0.014 km/h) slower than McLaughlin. Josef Newgarden, Alexander Rossi, Kyle Larson, and Santino Ferrucci also advanced to the Fast 6 session.

| Pos | No. | Driver | Team | Engine | Speed (mph) | Speed (km/h) |
Fast Six qualifiers
| 1 | 3 | (New Zealand) Scott McLaughlin | Team Penske | Chevrolet | 233.492 | 375.769 |
| 2 | 12 | (Australia) Will Power W | Team Penske | Chevrolet | 233.483 | 375.754 |
| 3 | 2 | (United States) Josef Newgarden W | Team Penske | Chevrolet | 233.286 | 375.437 |
| 4 | 7 | (United States) Alexander Rossi W | Arrow McLaren | Chevrolet | 233.071 | 375.091 |
| 5 | 17 | (United States) Kyle Larson R | Arrow McLaren / Rick Hendrick | Chevrolet | 232.788 | 374.636 |
| 6 | 14 | (United States) Santino Ferrucci | A. J. Foyt Racing | Chevrolet | 232.723 | 374.531 |
Positions 7–12
| 7 | 21 | (Netherlands) Rinus VeeKay | Ed Carpenter Racing | Chevrolet | 232.610 | 374.350 |
| 8 | 5 | (Mexico) Pato O'Ward | Arrow McLaren | Chevrolet | 232.584 | 374.308 |
| 9 | 60 | (Sweden) Felix Rosenqvist | Meyer Shank Racing | Honda | 232.305 | 373.859 |
| 10 | 75 | (Japan) Takuma Sato W | Rahal Letterman Lanigan Racing | Honda | 232.171 | 373.643 |
| 11 | 27 | (United States) Kyle Kirkwood | Andretti Global | Honda | 230.993 | 371.747 |
| 12 | 23 | (United States) Ryan Hunter-Reay W | Dreyer & Reinbold Racing w/ Cusick Motorsports | Chevrolet | 230.567 | 371.062 |
Official Report

==== Last Chance Qualifying ====
- Summary: Last Chance Qualifying began at 4:00 p.m. and ran until 5:00 p.m. The session determined positions 31–33 for the starting grid and which car would not qualify. Each car was given one guaranteed attempt, with subsequent attempts allowed but requiring the withdrawal of a previous attempt. Marcus Ericsson was slowest after the guaranteed runs after misjudging which of his four laps he was completing and slowing too early. With 25 minutes remaining, Ericsson deliberately ran a slow qualifying attempt in order to cool his engine (a tactic similar to previous years of the three-round system, when the top six teams that advanced to the final qualifying round for the pole were given a few laps under the safety car to cool their engines down) of 3:33.0358 for a speed of 168.986 miles per hour (271.957 km/h). Track action remained silent for the next twenty minutes.

With six minutes remaining, rookie Nolan Siegel was on the bubble. Ericsson returned to the track with six minutes remaining in the session and ran an average of 230.027 miles per hour (370.193 km/h) to bump himself into the field, in the process bumping Nolan Siegel out of the field. Siegel returned to the track shortly after Ericsson's run in a last ditch effort to improve his speed, but on his second lap made contact with the outside wall in turn 1, causing him to lose control and crash heavily in to the turn 2 SAFER barrier. Siegel was uninjured, but failed to qualify for the race.

| Pos | No. | Driver | Team | Engine | Speed (mph) | Speed (km/h) |
Positions 31–33
| 31 | 51 | (United Kingdom) Katherine Legge | Dale Coyne Racing w/ Rick Ware Racing | Honda | 230.092 | 370.297 |
| 32 | 28 | (Sweden) Marcus Ericsson W | Andretti Global | Honda | 230.027 | 370.193 |
| 33 | 15 | (United States) Graham Rahal | Rahal Letterman Lanigan Racing | Honda | 229.974 | 370.107 |
Failed to Qualify
| 34 | 18 | (United States) Nolan Siegel R | Dale Coyne Racing | Honda | 229.566 | 369.451 |
Official Report

==== Fast Six Qualifying ====
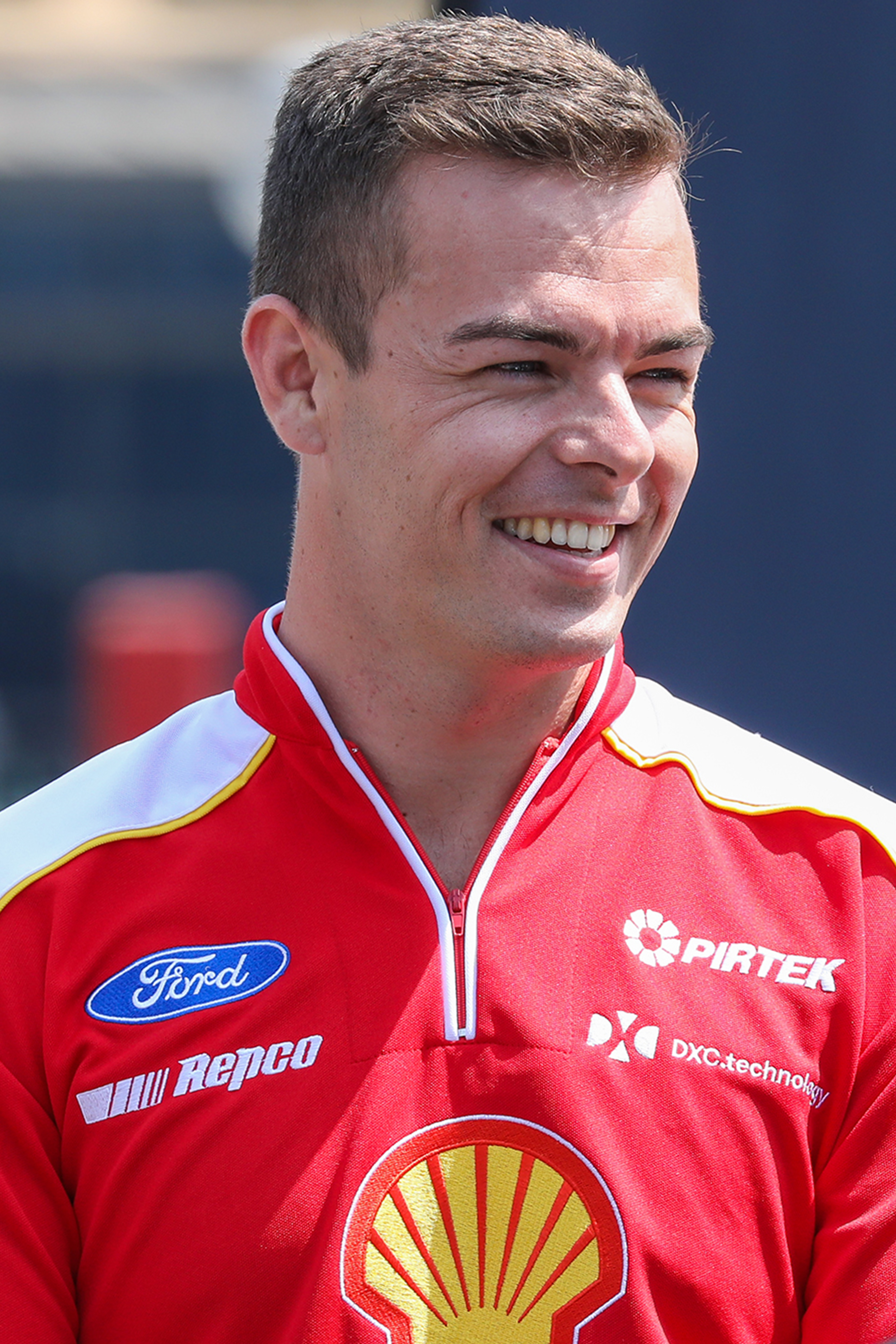
Scott McLaughlin qualified on pole with a new pole speed record.

- Summary: Fast Six qualifications began at 5:20 p.m. after a slight delay while crews cleaned the wreckage of Nolan Siegel's car from the Last Chance session. All drivers were give one attempt to qualify. Scott McLaughlin qualified on pole position, setting a new record for fastest Indianapolis 500 pole run with a speed of 234.220 miles per hour (376.941 km/h), eclipsing the mark set the previous year. Team Penske swept the entire front row of the grid, the second time the team had done so in their history (the first time coming in 1988).

| Pos | No. | Driver | Team | Engine | Speed (mph) | Speed (km/h) |
Positions 1–6
| 1 | 3 | (New Zealand) Scott McLaughlin | Team Penske | Chevrolet | 234.220 | 376.941 |
| 2 | 12 | (Australia) Will Power W | Team Penske | Chevrolet | 233.917 | 376.453 |
| 3 | 2 | (United States) Josef Newgarden W | Team Penske | Chevrolet | 233.808 | 376.278 |
| 4 | 7 | (United States) Alexander Rossi W | Arrow McLaren | Chevrolet | 233.090 | 375.122 |
| 5 | 17 | (United States) Kyle Larson R | Arrow McLaren/Rick Hendrick | Chevrolet | 232.846 | 374.729 |
| 6 | 14 | (United States) Santino Ferrucci | A. J. Foyt Racing | Chevrolet | 232.692 | 374.481 |
Official Report

== Post-qualifying practice ==
=== Post-qualifying practice — Monday May 20 ===
- Weather: 84 °F (29 °C), Mostly cloudy
- Summary: Post qualifying practice was held from 1:00 to 3:00 p.m. With qualifying completed, teams returned to their race-day turbo boost levels. Hot pit stops were allowed in the later part of the session. Josef Newgarden was fastest in the two-hour session, running a lap at 226.238 miles per hour (364.095 km/h). One minor incident occurred during hot pit stops, when Tom Blomqvist spun leaving his pit stall, though avoided damaging the car and did not cause a stoppage of the session.

Top practice speeds
| Pos | No. | Driver | Team | Engine | Speed (mph) | Speed (km/h) |
|---|---|---|---|---|---|---|
| 1 | 2 | (United States) Josef Newgarden | Team Penske | Chevrolet | 226.238 | 364.095 |
| 2 | 26 | (United States) Colton Herta | Andretti Global w/ Curb-Agajanian | Honda | 226.222 | 364.069 |
| 3 | 12 | (Australia) Will Power | Team Penske | Chevrolet | 226.137 | 363.932 |
Official Report

=== Carb Day – Friday May 24 ===
- Weather: 79 °F (26 °C), Partly cloudy
- Summary: Carb Day practice—the final practice before the race—was scheduled for two hours from 11:00 a.m. to 1:00 p.m. One minor incident occurred during the session when Kyle Larson ran out of fuel and came to a stop on track in turn 3 with roughly 15 minutes left in the session. Scott Dixon was fastest in the final practice session, running a lap at 227.206 mph (365.653 km/h). Following practice, participating teams moved on to the annual Pit Stop Challenge.

Top practice speeds
| Pos | No. | Driver | Team | Engine | Speed (mph) | Speed (km/h) |
|---|---|---|---|---|---|---|
| 1 | 9 | (New Zealand) Scott Dixon | Chip Ganassi Racing | Honda | 227.206 | 365.653 |
| 2 | 06 | (Brazil) Hélio Castroneves | Meyer Shank Racing | Honda | 226.939 | 365.223 |
| 3 | 5 | (Mexico) Pato O'Ward | Arrow McLaren | Chevrolet | 226.666 | 364.784 |
Official Report

== Pit Stop Challenge ==
The 45th annual Pit Stop Challenge was held Friday, May 24 after the completion of Carb Day practice. The participating teams were announced the day before the competition. A total of 14 teams competeted, with two teams (Will Power and Scott Dixon) receiving a first-round bye. Team Penske won the competition with Josef Newgarden's crew, defeating Arrow McLaren with Pato O'Ward's crew in a best-of-three final. It was the 19th win for Team Penske in the event and the second for Newgarden.

Round 1
7 | Alexander Rossi (Arrow McLaren) | 11.492
2 | Josef Newgarden (Team Penske) | 11.312
45 | Christian Lundgaard (Rahal Letterman) | 12.303
51 | Katherine Legge (Dale Coyne with RWR) | 19.888
78 | Agustín Canapino (Juncos Hollinger) | 13.071
77 | Romain Grosjean (Juncos Hollinger) | 12.251
27 | Kyle Kirkwood (Andretti Global) | 15.344
10 | Álex Palou (Chip Ganassi Racing) | 12.851
26 | Colton Herta (Andretti Global) | 11.954
15 | Graham Rahal (Rahal Letterman) | 12.122
5 | Pato O'Ward (Arrow McLaren) | 11.583
60 | Felix Rosenqvist (Meyer Shank Racing) | 12.882

Quarterfinals
12 | Will Power (Team Penske) | 12.103
2 | Josef Newgarden (Team Penske) | 11.152
45 | Christian Lundgaard (Rahal Letterman) | 13.671
77 | Romain Grosjean (Juncos Hollinger) | 12.524
9 | Scott Dixon (Chip Ganassi Racing) | 11.244
10 | Álex Palou (Chip Ganassi Racing) | 12.332
26 | Colton Herta (Andretti Global) | 13.817
5 | Pato O'Ward (Arrow McLaren) | 12.358

Semifinals
2 | Josef Newgarden (Team Penske) | 11.998
77 | Romain Grosjean (Juncos Hollinger) | 12.161
9 | Scott Dixon (Chip Ganassi Racing) | 14.536
5 | Pato O'Ward (Arrow McLaren) | 11.395

Finals (Best of 3)
2 | Josef Newgarden (Team Penske) | 11.333 | 10.792 | N/A | 2
5 | Pato O'Ward (Arrow McLaren) | 12.121 | 12.647 | N/A | 0

- Source for results:

== Starting grid ==
| Row | Inside | | Middle | | Outside | |
|---|---|---|---|---|---|---|
| 1 | 3 | (New Zealand) Scott McLaughlin | 12 | (Australia) Will Power W | 2 | (United States) Josef Newgarden W |
| 2 | 7 | (United States) Alexander Rossi W | 17 | (United States) Kyle Larson R | 14 | (United States) Santino Ferrucci |
| 3 | 21 | (Netherlands) Rinus VeeKay | 5 | (Mexico) Pato O'Ward | 60 | (Sweden) Felix Rosenqvist |
| 4 | 75 | (Japan) Takuma Sato W | 27 | (United States) Kyle Kirkwood | 23 | (United States) Ryan Hunter-Reay W |
| 5 | 26 | (United States) Colton Herta | 10 | (Spain) Álex Palou | 6 | (United Kingdom) Callum Ilott |
| 6 | 11 | (New Zealand) Marcus Armstrong R | 20 | (United States) Ed Carpenter | 4 | (Cayman Islands) Kyffin Simpson R |
| 7 | 98 | (United States) Marco Andretti | 06 | (Brazil) Hélio Castroneves W | 9 | (New Zealand) Scott Dixon W |
| 8 | 78 | (Argentina) Agustín Canapino | 41 | (United States) Sting Ray Robb | 33 | (Denmark) Christian Rasmussen R |
| 9 | 66 | (United Kingdom) Tom Blomqvist R | 77 | (France) Romain Grosjean | 8 | (Sweden) Linus Lundqvist R |
| 10 | 45 | (Denmark) Christian Lundgaard | 24 | (United States) Conor Daly | 30 | (Brazil) Pietro Fittipaldi |
| 11 | 51 | (United Kingdom) Katherine Legge | 28 | (Sweden) Marcus Ericsson W | 15 | (United States) Graham Rahal |

Failed to qualify

| No. | Driver | Team | Reason |
|---|---|---|---|
| 18 | (United States) Nolan Siegel R | Dale Coyne Racing | Fourth fastest in Last Chance Qualifying. Bumped from the field, crashed on final attempt. |

R Indianapolis 500 rookie
W Indianapolis 500 winner

== Race report ==
Cars completing a parade lap before the start of the race.

- Weather: 75 °F (24 °C), severe thunderstorms in the early afternoon, mostly cloudy in the late afternoon and evening.

The race was scheduled to begin at 12:45 p.m. on May 26. However, strong thunderstorms delayed the start of the race.

At the 2:30 p.m. weather update, Speedway president J. Douglas Boles notified the next potential band of storms could reach the Speedway vicinity after 8:00 p.m., which would be a concern. The priority is to avoid lightning and get the race in officially at 101 laps. As the track drying began at 2:42 p.m., the Speedway and Marion County authorities announced with sunset at 9:03 p.m. local time, and no floodlights, a time-certain finish would be set at 8:15 p.m. local time (EDT). If 101 laps had been completed by then, the race would conclude at the specified time regardless of how many laps were remaining. The Speedway hoped to avoid a repeat of the 2017 Brantley Gilbert Big Machine 400 NASCAR event, which ended less than ten minutes from sunset.

The green flag waved 4:44 p.m., the latest start time in the race's history, second latest start time to a major Speedway race (the 1995 Brickyard 400 started at 4:25 p.m. EST, or 5:25 p.m. EDT) .

=== First half ===
Before the race, Callum Ilott's car had mechanical problems and came to the pit lane. Ilott was able to take the start of the race, but started from the rear of the field.

At the start, Scott McLaughlin moved in to the lead from his pole position start. The race almost immediately fell in to a caution period, as farther in the field, Tom Blomqvist lost control of his car in turn 1 and collected Marcus Ericsson, causing both drivers to make contact with the outside wall. As cars attempted to avoid Blomqvist and Ericsson, Pietro Fittipaldi and Ilott made contact, causing Fittipaldi to lose control of his car and impact the wall in the south short-chute. Blomqvist, Ericsson, and Fittipaldi all retired from the race from the incident. Fittipaldi was held in the infield medical center for an extended check, but was released after being deemed to have no injuries. During the caution period to clean up the accident, Marcus Armstrong also fell out of the race after suffering an engine failure in his car. Racing resumed on lap 9, with McLaughlin maintaining his lead over his Team Penske teammates Josef Newgarden and Will Power. The race's second caution period came at lap 23, when Katherine Legge slowed on the race track with an engine failure. During the caution, the majority of the field made pit stops for the first time, with McLaughlin emerging first. A small number of drivers who had pitted during the first caution stayed out on track, resulting in Sting Ray Robb taking the lead of the race.

Racing resumed on lap 26, with Conor Daly, who had also stayed out during the caution, moving in to the lead. Two laps later, the third caution of the race came, as Linus Lundqvist lost control of his car after entering turn 1 four-wide with other cars, causing him to impact the outside wall. Racing resumed at lap 32, with Scott McLaughlin taking the lead back. McLaughlin and Pato O'Ward battled for the lead, while Daly remained in the lead pack until needing to make his next scheduled pit stop. The fourth caution of the race came at lap 56, when Felix Rosenqvist suffered an engine failure in his car and stopped on the back stretch. After more pit stops, Conor Daly returned to the lead of the race.

Racing resumed on lap 64. One lap later, Sting Ray Robb passed Daly to take the lead of the race. Once he and Daly pitted again, McLaughlin returned to the lead of the race. Colton Herta, who had started 13th, steadily moved up the field and eventually took second place behind McLaughlin, but on lap 86 lost control of his car in turn 1 and made contact with the outside wall, drawing the race's fifth caution period. Herta climbed from the car, but later returned to the race after the crew found the damage repairable – Herta would ultimately complete 170 laps before retiring from the race. Racing resumed at lap 91. As pit stops cycled through, several drivers took brief turns leading the race, including Rinus VeeKay and Christian Lundgaard. As the pit cycle was completed, Josef Newgarden inherited the lead at the halfway point.

=== Second half ===
The race's sixth caution period came at lap 107, when Ryan Hunter-Reay and Scott Dixon made contact on the back straight, causing Hunter-Reay to spin. The damage to Hunter-Reay's car would force him out of the race. Racing resumed at lap 114 with McLaughlin taking the lead back from Newgarden, but the race's seventh caution period came almost immediately, as Marco Andretti lost control of his car in turn 1 and impacted the outside wall. Racing resumed again on lap 118. McLaughlin and Newgarden remained in the lead, while Alexander Rossi and Santino Ferrucci also joined them in the lead battle. Kyle Larson served a drive-through penalty on lap 132 after speeding when entering pit road on the previous lap. As the leaders made their penultimate pit-stops around lap 135, Scott Dixon and Pato O'Ward, who were on alternate pit strategies, moved to the lead of the race. When they pitted, Conor Daly and Sting Ray Robb were shuffled to the front again as they ran their off-sequence pit strategy, while Dixon and O'Ward managed to remain ahead of Newgarden and McLaughlin.

The eighth and final caution period of the day came at lap 147, when Will Power lost control of his car in turn 1 and impacted the outside wall. Robb and Daly pitted during the caution, handing the lead to Dixon. The race restarted on lap 155. The lead battle was between Dixon, O'Ward, and Alexander Rossi as the field worked toward their final pit stops. Newgarden and Álex Palou ran just behind them. Scott McLaughlin, who had led much of the early running, began to slip down the order with problems with the clutch on his car slowing him.

=== Finish ===
Josef Newgarden celebrates his win.

The final round of pit stops came around lap 170. After the final pit stops, Josef Newgarden emerged ahead of Scott Dixon, with the Arrow McLaren teammates Alexander Rossi and Pato O'Ward behind. Rossi moved past Dixon and began a battle with Newgarden, with the two exchanging the lead several times. On lap 187, O'Ward passed Dixon for 3rd, and on lap 190 passed Rossi for 2nd and began to battle Newgarden. On the final lap, O'Ward successfully completed a pass to take the lead in turn one, but was passed back by Newgarden as they entered turn 3. Newgarden held the lead through the final corner to take victory for the second year in a row. The race finished at 7:43 p.m. local time, the latest it has ended, and 32 minutes before curfew.

Newgarden became the first driver to win back-to-back Indianapolis 500s since Hélio Castroneves in 2001 and 2002. He also became sixth driver in the history of the race to win consecutive runnings of the race, joining Castroneves, Wilbur Shaw, Mauri Rose, Bill Vukovich, and Al Unser. Additionally, Newgarden received a $440,000 bonus prize from BorgWarner for winning consecutive runnings. Newgarden received a record $4.288 million from a purse of $18,456,000. The victory was the 20th Indianapolis 500 win for Team Penske. The series initially announced 18 drivers led at least one lap during the race, but after review published a revised box score with only 16 leaders – the leader count was still a new record for most leaders in a single running of the Indianapolis 500. Kyle Larson was voted rookie of the year after qualifying fifth and finishing 18th in the race.

=== Aftermath ===
Following the discovery of modified attenuators on the Team Penske cars of Josef Newgarden and Will Power during qualifying ahead of the 2025 Indianapolis 500, both drivers were penalized and forced to start from the back of the grid for the 2025 race, among other sanctions. Journalists that visited Newgarden's 2024 race-winning car kept on display at the Indianapolis Motor Speedway Museum found the same modified attenuator installed that failed inspection.

== Box score ==
| Finish | No. | Driver | Team | Chassis | Engine | Laps | Status | Pit Stops | Grid | Pts.^{1} |
|---|---|---|---|---|---|---|---|---|---|---|
| 1 | 2 | (United States) Josef Newgarden W | Team Penske | Dallara UAK18 | Chevrolet | 200 | 167.763 mph | 5 | 3 | 61 |
| 2 | 5 | (Mexico) Pato O'Ward | Arrow McLaren | Dallara UAK18 | Chevrolet | 200 | +0.3417 | 6 | 8 | 46 |
| 3 | 9 | (New Zealand) Scott Dixon W | Chip Ganassi Racing | Dallara UAK18 | Honda | 200 | +0.9097 | 6 | 21 | 36 |
| 4 | 7 | (United States) Alexander Rossi W | Arrow McLaren | Dallara UAK18 | Chevrolet | 200 | +1.1691 | 5 | 4 | 42 |
| 5 | 10 | (Spain) Álex Palou | Chip Ganassi Racing | Dallara UAK18 | Honda | 200 | +1.5079 | 5 | 14 | 31 |
| 6 | 3 | (New Zealand) Scott McLaughlin | Team Penske | Dallara UAK18 | Chevrolet | 200 | +2.0593 | 5 | 1 | 43 |
| 7 | 27 | (United States) Kyle Kirkwood | Andretti Global | Dallara UAK18 | Honda | 200 | +2.5379 | 6 | 11 | 29 |
| 8 | 14 | (United States) Santino Ferrucci | A. J. Foyt Racing | Dallara UAK18 | Chevrolet | 200 | +3.6143 | 5 | 6 | 32 |
| 9 | 21 | (Netherlands) Rinus VeeKay | Ed Carpenter Racing | Dallara UAK18 | Chevrolet | 200 | +3.9560 | 5 | 7 | 29 |
| 10 | 24 | (United States) Conor Daly | Dreyer & Reinbold Racing with Cusick Motorsports | Dallara UAK18 | Chevrolet | 200 | +4.6071 | 6 | 29 | 21 |
| 11 | 6 | (United Kingdom) Callum Ilott | Arrow McLaren | Dallara UAK18 | Chevrolet | 200 | +4.9652 | 7 | 15 | 20 |
| 12 | 33 | (Denmark) Christian Rasmussen R | Ed Carpenter Racing | Dallara UAK18 | Chevrolet | 200 | +5.3234 | 6 | 24 | 18 |
| 13 | 45 | (Denmark) Christian Lundgaard | Rahal Letterman Lanigan Racing | Dallara UAK18 | Honda | 200 | +6.1824 | 7 | 28 | 18 |
| 14 | 75 | (Japan) Takuma Sato W | Rahal Letterman Lanigan Racing | Dallara UAK18 | Honda | 200 | +6.6893 | 6 | 10 | 19 |
| 15 | 15 | (United States) Graham Rahal | Rahal Letterman Lanigan Racing | Dallara UAK18 | Honda | 200 | +7.3608 | 7 | 33 | 15 |
| 16 | 41 | (United States) Sting Ray Robb | A. J. Foyt Racing | Dallara UAK18 | Chevrolet | 200 | +8.5098 | 5 | 23 | 15 |
| 17 | 20 | (United States) Ed Carpenter | Ed Carpenter Racing | Dallara UAK18 | Chevrolet | 200 | +8.9081 | 6 | 17 | 14 |
| 18 | 17 | (United States) Kyle Larson R | Arrow McLaren with Rick Hendrick | Dallara UAK18 | Chevrolet | 200 | +9.4846 | 6 | 5 | 21 |
| 19 | 77 | (France) Romain Grosjean | Juncos Hollinger Racing | Dallara UAK18 | Chevrolet | 200 | +9.8312 | 7 | 26 | 11 |
| 20 | 06 | (Brazil) Hélio Castroneves W | Meyer Shank Racing with Curb-Agajanian | Dallara UAK18 | Honda | 200 | +10.3602 | 5 | 20 | 10 |
| 21 | 4 | (Cayman Islands) Kyffin Simpson R | Chip Ganassi Racing | Dallara UAK18 | Honda | 200 | +11.0931 | 8 | 18 | 10 |
| 22 | 78 | (Argentina) Agustín Canapino | Juncos Hollinger Racing | Dallara UAK18 | Chevrolet | 199 | -1 Lap | 6 | 22 | 8 |
| 23 | 26 | (United States) Colton Herta | Andretti Global with Curb-Agajanian | Dallara UAK18 | Honda | 170 | Contact | 4 | 13 | 7 |
| 24 | 12 | (Australia) Will Power W | Team Penske | Dallara UAK18 | Chevrolet | 145 | Contact | 4 | 2 | 17 |
| 25 | 98 | (United States) Marco Andretti | Andretti Herta Autosport with Marco Andretti and Curb-Agajanian | Dallara UAK18 | Honda | 113 | Contact | 5 | 19 | 5 |
| 26 | 23 | (United States) Ryan Hunter-Reay W | Dreyer & Reinbold Racing with Cusick Motorsports | Dallara UAK18 | Chevrolet | 107 | Contact | 4 | 12 | 6 |
| 27 | 60 | (Sweden) Felix Rosenqvist | Meyer Shank Racing | Dallara UAK18 | Honda | 55 | Mechanical | 1 | 9 | 9 |
| 28 | 8 | (Sweden) Linus Lundqvist R | Chip Ganassi Racing | Dallara UAK18 | Honda | 27 | Contact | 2 | 27 | 5 |
| 29 | 51 | (United Kingdom) Katherine Legge | Dale Coyne Racing with Rick Ware Racing | Dallara UAK18 | Honda | 22 | Mechanical | 1 | 31 | 5 |
| 30 | 11 | (New Zealand) Marcus Armstrong R | Chip Ganassi Racing | Dallara UAK18 | Honda | 6 | Mechanical | 0 | 16 | 5 |
| 31 | 66 | (United Kingdom) Tom Blomqvist R | Meyer Shank Racing | Dallara UAK18 | Honda | 0 | Contact | 0 | 25 | 5 |
| 32 | 30 | (Brazil) Pietro Fittipaldi | Rahal Letterman Lanigan Racing | Dallara UAK18 | Honda | 0 | Contact | 0 | 30 | 5 |
| 33 | 28 | (Sweden) Marcus Ericsson W | Andretti Global | Dallara UAK18 | Honda | 0 | Contact | 0 | 32 | 5 |
Official Box Score

W Former Indianapolis 500 winner

R Indianapolis 500 Rookie

All entrants utilized Firestone tires.

^{1} Points include qualification points from time trials, 1 point for leading a lap, and 2 points for most laps led.

=== Race statistics ===
Lap Leaders
| Laps | Leader |
|---|---|
| 1–23 | Scott McLaughlin |
| 24–26 | Sting Ray Robb |
| 27–31 | Conor Daly |
| 32 | Sting Ray Robb |
| 33–35 | Scott McLaughlin |
| 36–42 | Conor Daly |
| 43–57 | Scott McLaughlin |
| 58–64 | Conor Daly |
| 65–76 | Sting Ray Robb |
| 77–87 | Scott McLaughlin |
| 88–91 | Rinus VeeKay |
| 92–93 | Christian Lundgaard |
| 94–96 | Rinus VeeKay |
| 97–99 | Christian Lundgaard |
| 100–112 | Josef Newgarden |
| 113–125 | Scott McLaughlin |
| 126–129 | Josef Newgarden |
| 130 | Scott McLaughlin |
| 131 | Alexander Rossi |
| 132 | Santino Ferrucci |
| 133–134 | Scott Dixon |
| 135–136 | Pato O'Ward |
| 137–140 | Scott Dixon |
| 141–143 | Conor Daly |
| 144–150 | Sting Ray Robb |
Official Box Score

Lap Leaders (con't)
| Laps | Leader |
|---|---|
| 151–154 | Scott Dixon |
| 155 | Pato O'Ward |
| 156–159 | Alexander Rossi |
| 160 | Pato O'Ward |
| 161–163 | Alexander Rossi |
| 164 | Pato O'Ward |
| 165 | Alexander Rossi |
| 166–169 | Pato O'Ward |
| 170–171 | Scott Dixon |
| 172 | Álex Palou |
| 173 | Rinus VeeKay |
| 174–175 | Kyle Kirkwood |
| 176 | Callum Ilott |
| 177–179 | Ed Carpenter |
| 180–183 | Kyle Larson |
| 184–186 | Kyffin Simpson |
| 187 | Alexander Rossi |
| 188–190 | Josef Newgarden |
| 191–192 | Alexander Rossi |
| 193–194 | Josef Newgarden |
| 195 | Pato O'Ward |
| 196–198 | Josef Newgarden |
| 199 | Pato O'Ward |
| 200 | Josef Newgarden |
Official Box Score

Total laps led
| Driver | Laps |
|---|---|
| Scott McLaughlin | 66 |
| Josef Newgarden | 26 |
| Sting Ray Robb | 23 |
| Conor Daly | 22 |
| Scott Dixon | 12 |
| Alexander Rossi | 12 |
| Pato O'Ward | 11 |
| Rinus VeeKay | 8 |
| Christian Lundgaard | 5 |
| Kyle Larson | 4 |
| Ed Carpenter | 3 |
| Kyffin Simpson | 3 |
| Kyle Kirkwood | 2 |
| Álex Palou | 1 |
| Santino Ferrucci | 1 |
| Callum Ilott | 1 |
Official Box Score

Cautions: 8 for 46 laps
| Laps | Reason |
|---|---|
| 1–8 | Blomqvist, Fittipaldi, Ericsson crash in turn 2 |
| 22–25 | Legge blown engine |
| 28–31 | Lundqvist crash in turn 1 |
| 56–63 | Rosenqvist blown engine |
| 86–90 | Herta crash in turn 2 |
| 107–112 | Hunter-Reay contact with Dixon and spin on the backstraight |
| 114–117 | Andretti crash in turn 1 |
| 147–154 | Power crash in turn 1 |
Official Box Score

== Broadcasting ==
=== Television ===
The race was carried live on television in the United States on NBC Sports. This was NBC's last Indy 500 under their full-time relationship with IndyCar which began in 2019; 2025's race was aired on Fox. Originally, it was planned for the race to be blacked out in the Indianapolis market, keeping in line with IndyCar's long standing blackout policies; a tape-delayed broadcast would have been shown on local NBC affiliate WTHR. After a weather delay, WTHR announced that the race would air live in Indianapolis. It was the first time the race has aired live in Indianapolis since 2021, when attendance restrictions stemming from the COVID-19 pandemic limited the tickets sold.

On May 14, NBC announced that Jimmie Johnson would join the broadcast team for pre-race coverage and in-race analysis before leaving Indianapolis to compete in the Coca-Cola 600 later in the day. On May 16, NBC announced that both Danica Patrick and Mike Tirico would reprise their roles in pre-race and post-race coverage that they had held for several years. NBC's NASCAR commentator Jeff Burton and pit reporter Kim Coon joined the broadcast as roaming reporters.

NBC
| Booth announcers | Pre/Post-race | Pit/garage reporters |
|---|---|---|
| Announcer: Leigh Diffey; Color: Townsend Bell; Color: James Hinchcliffe | NBC Host: Mike Tirico; Studio Analyst: Danica Patrick; Analyst/Features: Jimmie Johnson; Features: Jeff Burton; Features: Kim Coon | Marty Snider; Dillon Welch; Dave Burns; Kevin Lee |

=== Radio ===
The race and all official sessions for the event were broadcast by the Indianapolis Motor Speedway Radio Network. The chief announcer was Mark Jaynes, with Davey Hamilton as driver analyst.

IMS Radio Network
| Booth Announcers | Turn Reporters | Pit/garage reporters |
|---|---|---|
| Chief Announcer: Mark Jaynes; Driver expert: Davey Hamilton | Turn 1: Nick Yeoman; Turn 2: Michael Young; Turn 3: Jake Query; Turn 4: Chris Denari | Alex Wollf; Rob Blackman; Ryan Myrehn; Rich Nye |

| Previous race: 2024 Sonsio Grand Prix | IndyCar Series; 2024 season | Next race: 2024 Chevrolet Detroit Grand Prix |
| Previous race: 2023 Indianapolis 500 | Indianapolis 500 | Next race: 2025 Indianapolis 500 |
