= Pit Stop Challenge =

Competition in Speedway, Indiana

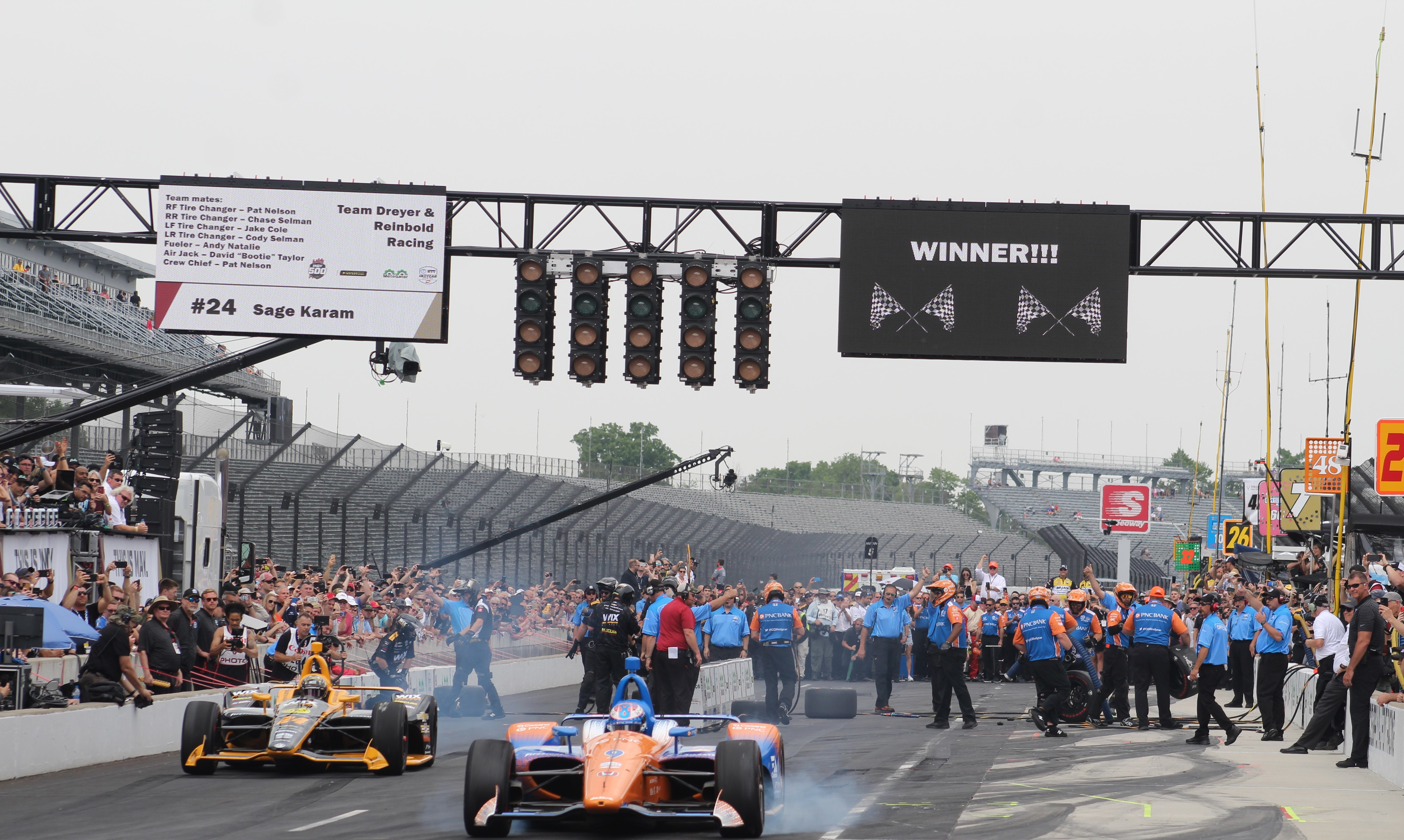
- Action during the 2019 Pit Stop Challenge
- Sport: American open-wheel car racing
- Competition: Pit stop contest
- Discipline: IndyCar Series
- Awarded for: Outstanding performance by a pit crew

History
- First award: 1977
- First winner: Jim McElreath (Carillo Racing)
- Most wins: Team Penske (20)
- Most recent: Josef Newgarden (Team Penske)

The Pit Stop Challenge is a single elimination, pit stop competition held before the Indianapolis 500 at the Indianapolis Motor Speedway in Speedway, Indiana. It takes place after the final practice session on Carb Day, which is held two days before the race. (Note: From 1977 to 2004, the event was held three days before the race on Thursday. Starting in 2005, Carb Day was moved to Friday and the event moved to Friday along with the Freedom 100, an Indy Lights race.) First held in 1977, the contest has pit crews compete head-to-head in single-round eliminations for three rounds. In each round they conduct a standard pit stop—switching all four tires on a racing vehicle and simulating refueling via a fuel hose connection to the fuel tank—in the shortest possible time in a drag race–style event that happens in a specially constructed dual pit lane. (Note: Previously, tire fitting was restricted to a racing car's right-hand side.) Each round commences with the green lights being illuminated to signal to both drivers who are lined up side-by-side to begin from a standing start. They enter the pit box and stop there before crossing the finish line, which is 200 ft (61 m) away, as fast as possible. While no fuel is actually flowing, the fuel hose must be connected to the fuel tank for a minimum of three seconds. The time a team's car spends in its pit box determines the winner, and the fastest team in each pairing advances to the next round. Squads may be assessed time penalties if they exit their pit box with an incorrectly fitted tire, if pit crews or equipment leave their designated area, or if a driver runs over pit equipment such as an air hose.

Since 2017, the top two teams have competed in a three-round final. The team with the fastest time in the semi-finals gets to select their preferred lane for the final, and the team with the fastest time in the final gets to choose their favored lane for the third and deciding round. The tournament bracket is decided by a blind draw, and the top four teams receive a bye from the first round to the quarter-finals, with the remaining squads beginning in the first round. Contest participants are selected from IndyCar Series–registered teams and Indianapolis 500 entrants. Qualification for the contest is based on pit stop performance after the last Indianapolis 500, current season IndyCar entrant standings positions, and one-off Indianapolis 500 entries. (Note: Previous criteria included pit stop time trials held during the race week and a selection made by the race's promoter.) The winning team and driver share the winners' prize of $50,000 from $150,000 total prize money. (Note: The prize money given to the winning team has been variously set at $8,250, $10,000, $20,000, $25,000, $35,000, $37,500, $40,000, and $42,500.) Each crew member receives pit lane equipment from prize donors at a Gasoline Alley giveaway as well as Jostens custom-designed rings.

The competition allows pit crews for the Indianapolis 500 to adjust their routines, practice to reduce errors, and become acquainted with their pit lane box. Past sponsors of the competition include Miller, Coors, Checkers/Rally's, McDonald's, Izod, TAG Heuer, and Ruoff Mortgage. It was canceled in 2008 and 2026 due to rain, and all advertised prize monies were donated to charity; it was also canceled in both 2020 and 2021 because of the COVID-19 pandemic in Indiana. As of May 2025, the record for the most victories is held by Team Penske with 20 wins since their first win in the 1981 final. Galles Racing are in second place with six wins, and Chip Ganassi Racing are third with four victories. Hélio Castroneves has the most victories among drivers, with eight, followed by Scott Dixon and Danny Sullivan with four wins each. Rick Rinaman has four wins, more than any other chief mechanic. Matt Jonsson, Travis Law, and Owen Snyder follow in second place with three victories each. The inaugural winner was Jim McElreath of Carrillo Racing in the 1977 final, while the most recent winner was Josef Newgarden of Team Penske in the 2025 final.

== Winners and runner-ups ==
Key
†	Indicates driver won the contest and the Indianapolis 500 in the same year
2–1	Denotes an entrant's winning score from 2017–present
s	Time in seconds

Winners and runners-up of the Pit Stop Challenge
Year	Winner				Score	Runner-up				Ref
Year	Team	Driver	Chief Mechanic	Time (s)	Score	Team	Driver	Chief Mechanic	Time (s)	Ref
1977	Carrillo	Jim McElreath	Dave Klym	15.09	N/A	Patrick Racing	Wally Dallenbach Sr.	George Bignotti	15.82	
1978	Team McLaren	Johnny Rutherford	Steve Roby	13.80	N/A	Polak Racing	Larry Dickson	Chuck Looper	17.27	
1978	Team McLaren	Johnny Rutherford	Phil Sharp	13.80	N/A	Polak Racing	Larry Dickson	Chuck Looper	17.27	
1979	Team McLaren	Johnny Rutherford	Steve Roby	13.51	N/A	Jerry O’Connell	Tom Sneva	Jud Phillips	13.94	
1980	AMI Racing Division	Tom Bigelow	Paul Leffler	14.04	N/A	AMI Racing Division	Greg Leffler	Paul Leffler	14.50	
1981	Team Penske	Bobby Unser†	Laurie Gerrish	13.00	N/A	Kraco Racing	Larry Cannon	Phil Trasher	23.20	
1982	Team Penske	Rick Mears	Peter Parrott	13.930	N/A	A. J. Foyt Enterprises	A. J. Foyt	Jack Starne	18.050	
1983	Team Penske	Rick Mears	Peter Parrott	13.860	N/A	Alex Morales	Pancho Carter	Johnny Caples	15.528	
1984	Kraco Racing	Michael Andretti	Brian Stewart	18.520	N/A	Mayer Motor Racing	Howdy Holmes	Steve Roby	18.948	
1985	Team Penske	Danny Sullivan†	Chuck Sprague	11.742	N/A	Forsythe Racing	Howdy Holmes	Barry Green	11.734	
1986	Team Penske	Danny Sullivan	Chuck Sprague	20.288	N/A	Truesports	Bobby Rahal	Steve Horne	22.734	
1987	Newman/Haas Racing	Mario Andretti	Colin Duff	18.050	N/A	Truesports	Bobby Rahal	Steve Horne	23.270	
1988 (Note: The 1988 Pit Stop Challenge final was re-run after both teams received penalties in the first final: Danny Sullivan because a tire fitter went over the barrier too soon and Mario Andretti for fitting the wrong tires.)	Team Penske	Danny Sullivan	Chuck Sprague	14.782	N/A	Newman/Haas Racing	Mario Andretti	Colin Duff	15.006	
1989	Galles Racing	Al Unser Jr.	Owen Snyder	14.716	N/A	Newman/Haas Racing	Mario Andretti	Colin Duff	26.582 (Note: Mario Andretti was penalized five seconds for having a loose wheel fitted to his car.)	
1990	Galles-Kraco Racing	Al Unser Jr.	Owen Snyder	14.094	N/A	Galles-Kraco Racing	Bobby Rahal	Jim Prescott	No Time (Note: The pit crew of Bobby Rahal was unable to record a time due to a cross-threaded left rear lug nut.)	
1991	Patrick Racing	Danny Sullivan	Mike Hull	13.114	N/A	Galles-Kraco Racing	Bobby Rahal	Jim Prescott	13.382	
1992	Rahal-Hogan Racing	Bobby Rahal	Jim Prescott	13.324	N/A	Chip Ganassi Racing	Eddie Cheever	Chris Griffis	No Time (Note: Eddie Cheever did not record a time because he did not leave his pit stall.)	
1993	Galles-Kraco Racing	Al Unser Jr.	Owen Snyder	13.118	N/A	Newman/Haas Racing	Mario Andretti	John Simmonds	16.104	
1994	Forsythe Green Racing	Jacques Villeneuve	Kyle Moyer	12.867	N/A	Team LOSI	John Paul Jr.	Randy Bain	13.590	
1995	Team Green	Jacques Villeneuve†	Kyle Moyer	14.556	N/A	Newman/Haas Racing	Michael Andretti	Tim Bumps	14.660	
1996	Galles Racing	Davy Jones	Mitch Davis	14.176	N/A	Pagan Racing	Roberto Guerrero	Doug Barnes	16.368	
1997	Galles Racing	Kenny Bräck	Gary Armentrout	14.284	N/A	Team Cheever	Eddie Cheever	Mitch Davis	15.133	
1998	Panther Racing	Scott Goodyear	Kevin Blanch	17.307 (Note: A loose lugnut added five seconds to Panther Racing's original time of 12.307 seconds. Team Menard did not record a time because Robbie Buhl stalled and he was unable to leave his pit box.)	N/A	Team Menard	Robbie Buhl	John O'Gara	No Time	
1999	Galles Racing	Davey Hamilton	Darren Russell	12.680	N/A	A. J. Foyt Enterprises	Kenny Bräck	Bill Spencer	14.560	
2000	Panther Racing	Scott Goodyear	Kevin Blanch	11.190	N/A	Treadway Racing	Robby McGehee	Rick Hurford	12.720 (Note: For allowing a tire to leave the pit box, Treadway Racing was imposed a three-second time penalty.)	
2001	Kelley Racing	Scott Sharp	Robert Perez	9.20	N/A	Galles Racing	Al Unser Jr.	Russ Marr	12.67	
2002	Team Penske	Hélio Castroneves†	Rick Rinaman	8.555	N/A	Chip Ganassi Racing	Jeff Ward	Barry Wasner	10.3433	
2003	Cheever Racing	Buddy Rice	David Meehan	8.8401	N/A	Team Penske	Hélio Castroneves	Rick Rinaman	9.1341	
2004	Rahal Letterman Racing	Buddy Rice†	Ricardo Nault	12.3365	N/A	Team Penske	Hélio Castroneves	Rick Rinaman	24.4430 (Note: Team Penske was penalized ten seconds for Hélio Castroneves driving over an air hose as he exited the pit box.)	
2005	Team Penske	Sam Hornish Jr.	Matt Jonsson	8.9704	N/A	Andretti Green Racing	Bryan Herta	Jeff Grahn	9.9170	
2006	Team Penske	Hélio Castroneves	Rick Rinaman	8.0852	N/A	Andretti Green Racing	Dario Franchitti	Dave Popielarz	8.4428	
2007	Team Penske	Hélio Castroneves	Rick Rinaman	8.335	N/A	Team Penske	Sam Hornish Jr.	Matt Jonsson	8.888	
2008	Canceled due to rain									
2009	Team Penske	Hélio Castroneves†	Rick Rinaman	7.962	N/A	Andretti Green Racing	Marco Andretti	Jeff Grahn	9.456	
2010	Team Penske	Hélio Castroneves	Sean Hanrahan	8.001	N/A	Newman/Haas Racing	Hideki Mutoh	Todd Phillips	9.548	
2011	Team Penske	Ryan Briscoe	Matt Jonsson	7.882	N/A	Chip Ganassi Racing	Dario Franchitti	Kevin O'Donnell	8.481	
2012	Chip Ganassi Racing	Scott Dixon	Kevin O'Donnell	13.769	N/A	Dreyer & Reinbold Racing	Oriol Servià	Chris Hogue	17.194	
2013	Team Penske	Hélio Castroneves	Sean Hanrahan	14.475	N/A	Chip Ganassi Racing	Dario Franchitti	Kevin O'Donnell	14.854	
2014	Chip Ganassi Racing	Scott Dixon	Blair Julian	11.658	N/A	Dreyer & Reinbold Racing	Sage Karam	Mark Weida	12.163	
2015	Team Penske	Hélio Castroneves	Travis Law	12.561	N/A	Chip Ganassi Racing	Charlie Kimball	Mark Sampson	13.017	
2016	Team Penske	Hélio Castroneves	Travis Law	12.235	N/A	Schmidt Peterson Motorsports	Mikhail Aleshin	Taylor Kiel	19.381	
2017	Team Penske	Will Power	Matt Jonsson	11.614	2–1	Schmidt Peterson Motorsports	James Hinchcliffe	N/A	13.223	
2018	Chip Ganassi Racing	Scott Dixon	Blair Julian	11.614	2–1	Schmidt Peterson Motorsports	James Hinchcliffe	N/A	12.495	
2019	Arrow Schmidt Peterson Motorsports	Marcus Ericsson	Bob Jansen	11.794	2–1	Chip Ganassi Racing	Scott Dixon	Blair Julian	13.132	
2020	Canceled due to the COVID-19 pandemic in Indiana									
2021	Canceled due to the COVID-19 pandemic in Indiana									
2022	Team Penske	Josef Newgarden	Travis Law	10.949	2–0	Chip Ganassi Racing	Scott Dixon	Blair Julian	11.911	
2023	Chip Ganassi Racing	Scott Dixon	Tyler Rees	11.012	2–1	Team Penske	Will Power	Trevor Lacasse	12.552	
2024	Team Penske	Josef Newgarden†	Chad Gordon	10.792	2–0	Arrow McLaren	Pato O'Ward	Chris Nash	12.647	
2025	Team Penske	Josef Newgarden	Chad Gordon	10.263	2–1	Team Penske	Will Power	Trevor Lacasse	10.503	
2026	Canceled due to rain									

== Statistics ==
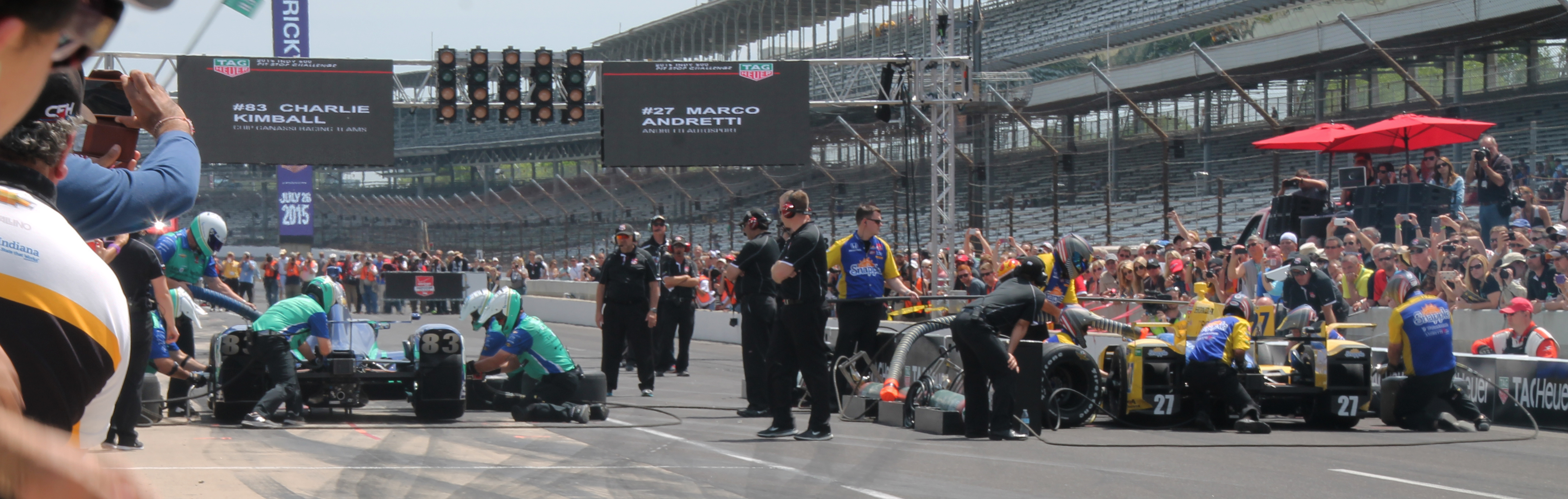
Action from the 2015 Pit Stop Challenge

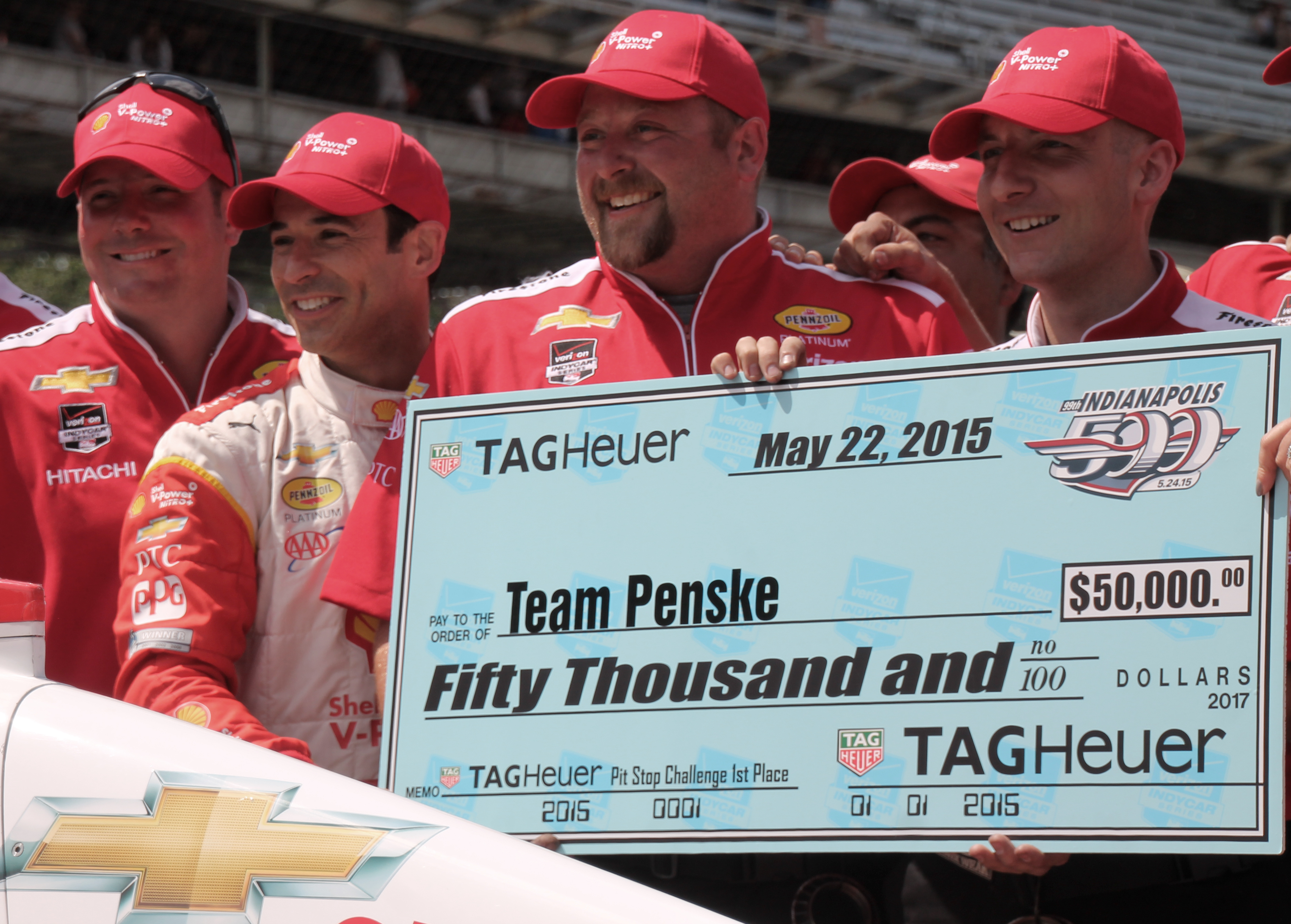
Team Penske won the 2015 Pit Stop Challenge

Multiple wins by team
Team	Wins	First win	Last win
Team Penske	20	1981	2025
Galles Racing	6	1989	1999
Chip Ganassi Racing	4	2012	2023
Andretti Green Racing	2	1994	1995
Panther Racing	2	1998	2000
Rahal Letterman Racing	2	1992	2004
Team McLaren	2	1978	1979

Multiple wins by driver
Driver	Wins	First win	Last win
Hélio Castroneves	8	2002	2016
Scott Dixon	4	2012	2023
Danny Sullivan	4	1985	1991
Josef Newgarden	3	2022	2025
Al Unser Jr.	3	1989	1993
Scott Goodyear	2	1998	2000
Rick Mears	2	1982	1983
Buddy Rice	2	2003	2004
Johnny Rutherford	2	1978	1979
Jacques Villeneuve	2	1994	1995

Multiple wins by chief mechanic
Chief mechanic	Wins	First win	Last win
Rick Rinaman	4	2002	2009
Matt Jonsson	3	2005	2017
Travis Law	3	2015	2022
Owen Snyder	3	1989	1993
Chuck Sprague	3	1985	1988
Kevin Blanch	2	1998	2000
Chad Gordon	2	2024	2025
Sean Hanrahan	2	2010	2013
Blair Julian	2	2014	2018
Kyle Moyer	2	1994	1995
Peter Parrott	2	1982	1983
Steve Roby	2	1978	1979

== See also ==
- Pit Crew Challenge

== Bibliography ==
- Ash, Russell (2010). "The 10 Latest Winners of the Indy 500 Pit Stop Challenge". Top 10 for Men: Over 250 Lists That Matter!. London: Hamlyn. ISBN 978-0-600-62070-9 – via the Internet Archive.
