= Push-to-pass =

Auto racing temporary speed boost system

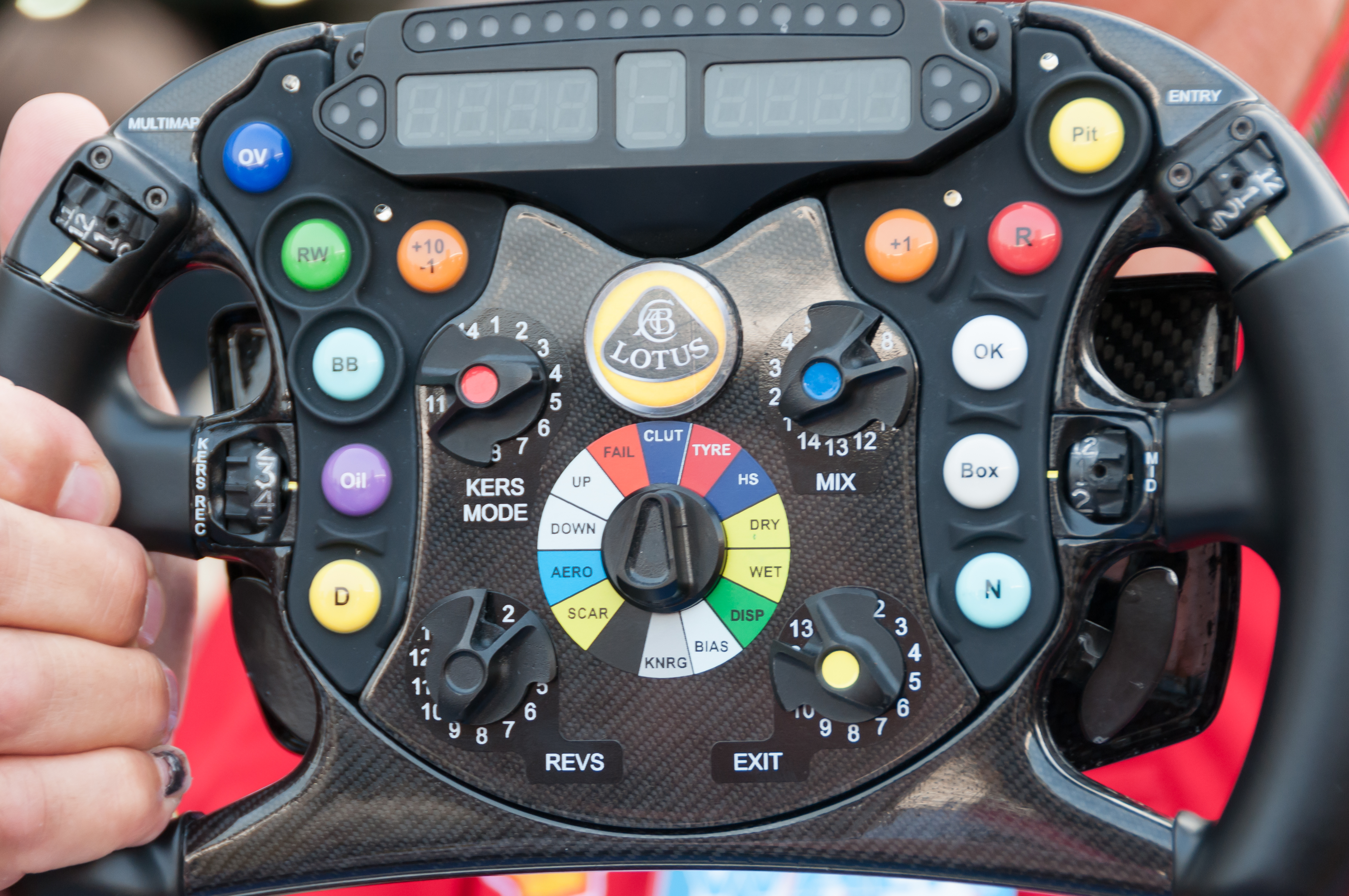
Overtake button (blue with letters "OV") on a Formula 1 steering wheel from 2012

Push-to-pass is a mechanism on a race car which provides the driver with the ability to increase the car's power for short periods, usually via a button on the steering wheel. The system is designed to make overtaking easier, and hence make the sport more exciting to watch. The increased power can stem from various mechanisms, for example by changing engine modes or utilizing energy stored in an extra battery. Presently, all racing associations except drag racing ban nitrous oxide for use in boosting of internal combustion engines.

== Use ==
Several racing series have implemented push-to-pass systems, including the former Champ Car series, the A1GP series (who refer to their system as PowerBoost), Audi Sport TT Cup (since 2015), DTM (since 2019), Indy Lights (since 2015), IndyCar Series (who refer to the system as an overtake button), Super Formula (since 2021), and Formula Regional EU (since 2022).

=== IndyCar ===
In every non-oval race, drivers are budgeted between 150 and 200 seconds of extra power per race, to “on the button” at their discretion to either attempt a pass, defend from a car behind, or even decrease their lap times. These 200 seconds of extra power can be activated for up to 20 seconds at a time, giving drivers a minimum of 10 power deliveries per race.

=== Super Formula ===
Since the 2021 season, Super Formula has adopted a similar system to IndyCar's push-to-pass system as Overtake System (OTS). Each driver is allocated up to 200 seconds of OTS (20 seconds for each usage), followed by an at least 100-second cooldown period, depending on the race.

=== Formula Regional EU ===
Since the 2022 season, the Formula Regional European Championship has adopted the push-to-pass system. Each driver gets five presses of the button per race, with a maximum of 15 seconds of usage of the additional engine performance per push, unless a race is red-flagged and restarted in which case the allowance could be reset.

=== Formula E ===
Starting with its debut season, Formula E featured Fanboost, where fans were able to vote for their favourite driver via various social media channels to give them an extra power boost at each race. For the 2018–19 season, an Attack Mode was also introduced, where drivers receive a boost by driving through a designated area of the circuit off the racing line. They can then press the attack mode button in a designated attack mode zone to activate the engine boost. Before the 2022–23 season, Fanboost was removed from Formula E.

=== Formula 1 ===
In Formula One, the kinetic energy recovery system (KERS) functions in a similar manner; however, it relies on regenerative braking to store energy for later use, rather than simply increasing the engine's power, as is the case in some other systems. The drag reduction system (DRS), by contrast, increases acceleration and top speed by moving an element of the rear wing to reduce drag rather than by boosting power; its use in races is more restricted.

== Use other than for overtaking ==
No requirement limits the system’s use only when attempting to overtake another car. For example, a driver may choose to operate the system to defend a position, or to improve lap time during qualifying or during a race while performing an undercut or overcut. The amount of extra power, the amount of boost time and the number of boost activations available during the race vary from series to series.

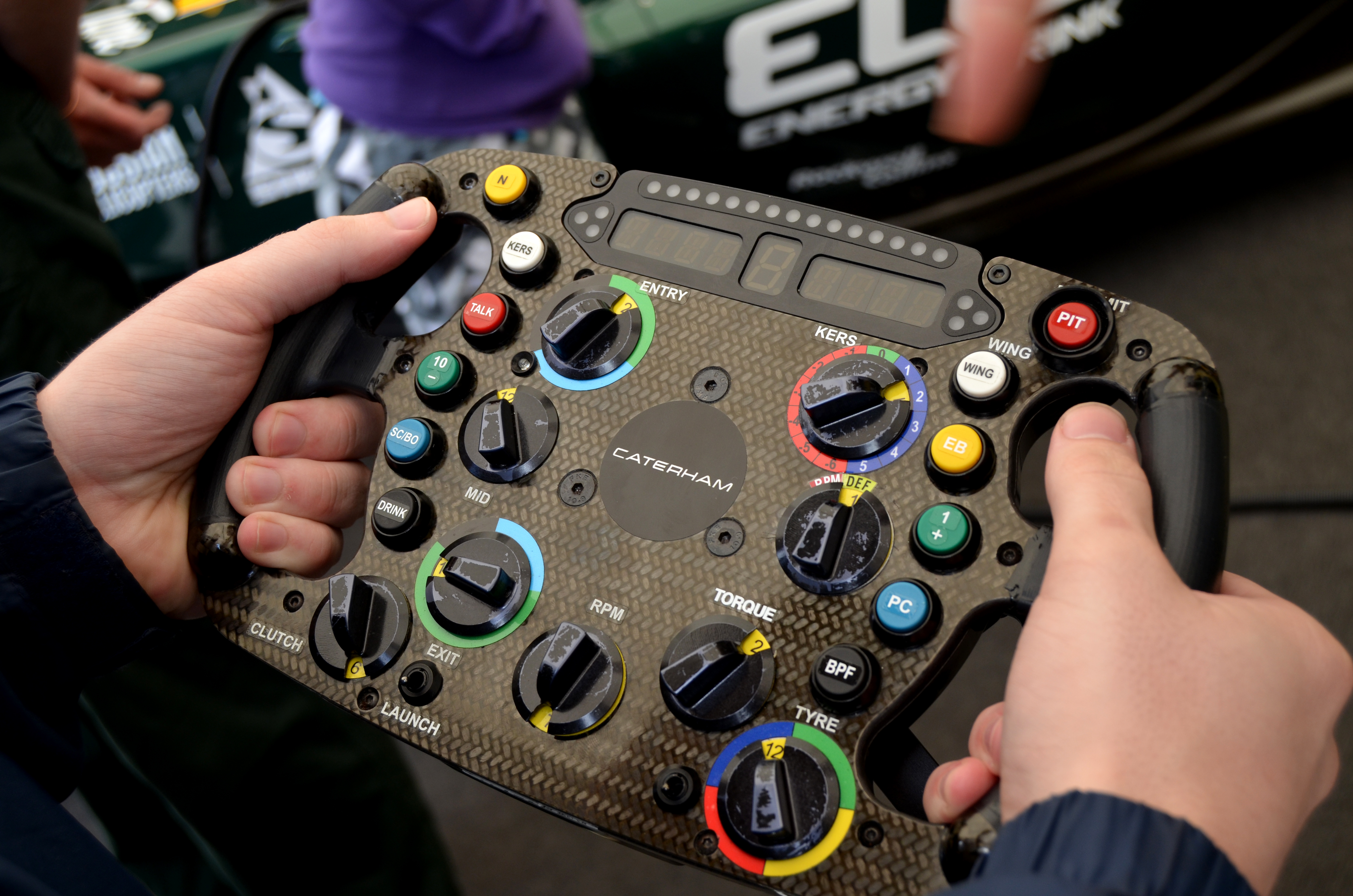
White KERS button on the left side of a 2012 Formula 1 steering wheel from Caterham

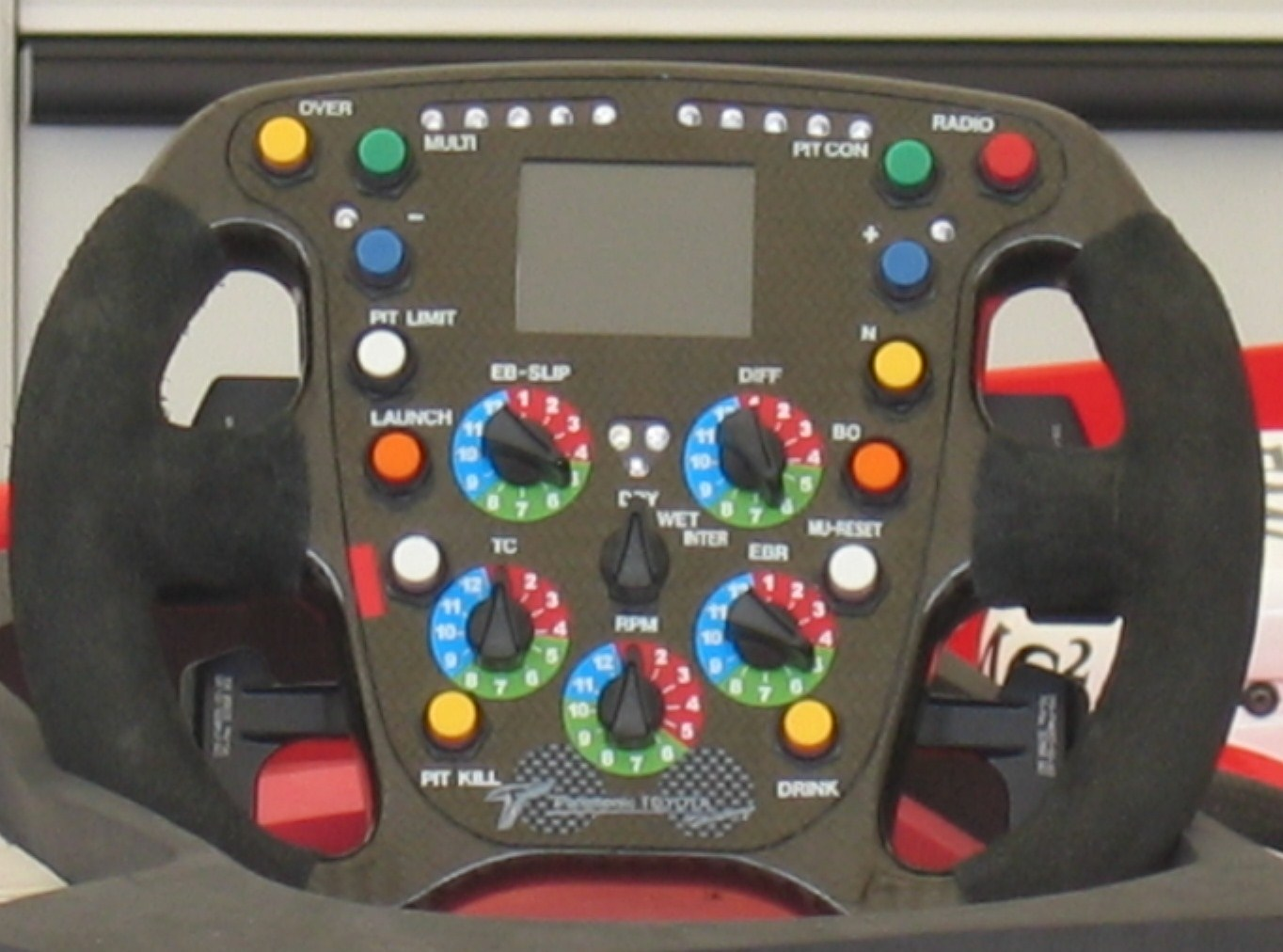
Yellow button marked "over" on the top left side of a 2008 Formula 1 steering wheel Toyota
