= List of NASCAR on NBC broadcasters =

The following is a list of current and former broadcasters for NASCAR on NBC.

== Current commentators ==
=== NASCAR Cup Series ===
NBC's 2026 lineup of broadcasters for the Cup Series is as follows:

==== Booth announcers ====
- Leigh Diffey (play-by-play)
- Jeff Burton (color commentator)
- Steve Letarte (color commentator)

==== Pit reporters ====
- Trevor Bayne
- Dave Burns
- Kim Coon
- Marty Snider

==== Pre and post-race show ====
- Marty Snider (host)
- Dale Jarrett (analyst)
- Brad Daugherty (analyst)

== Broadcast lineups by year ==
2024

NASCAR Cup Series
Booth announcers

- Rick Allen (play-by-play, first 8 races)
- Leigh Diffey (play-by-play, last 12 races)
- Steve Letarte (color commentator)
- Jeff Burton (color commentator)
- Mike Bagley (commentator for the Chicago Street Course and Watkins Glen radio-style broadcasts)
- Dillon Welch (commentator for the Chicago Street Course and Watkins Glen radio-style broadcasts)

=== Pit reporters ===
- Dave Burns
- Kim Coon
- Parker Kligerman
- Marty Snider
- Dillon Welch

Note: NBC usually has 3 or 4 pit reporters per Cup race and 2 or 3 per Xfinity race. All 5 of them take turns, and the pit reporters that aren't on the broadcast are usually pit reporting for an IndyCar race for NBC or IMSA race if there is one on the same day and/or weekend. Coon and Welch also split time between NBC and Motor Racing Network.

Pre and post-race show

- Marty Snider (host)
- Brad Daugherty (rotating analyst)
- Dale Jarrett (rotating analyst)
- Kyle Petty (rotating analyst)
- Jeff Burton (rotating analyst)
- Steve Letarte (rotating analyst)
- Jimmie Johnson (rotating analyst)

NASCAR Xfinity Series
Booth announcers

- Rick Allen (play-by-play)
- Dave Burns (alternative play-by-play)
- Steve Letarte (color commentator)
- Jeff Burton (color commentator)
- Dale Jarrett (color commentator)
- Mike Bagley (commentator for the Chicago Street Course and Watkins Glen radio-style broadcasts)
- Dillon Welch (commentator for the Chicago Street Course and Watkins Glen radio-style broadcasts)

Pit reporters

- Dave Burns
- Kim Coon
- Marty Snider
- Dillon Welch

Note: NBC usually has 3 or 4 pit reporters per Cup race and 2 or 3 per Xfinity race. All 4 of them take turns, and the pit reporters that aren't on the broadcast are usually pit reporting for an IndyCar race for NBC or IMSA race if there is one on the same day and/or weekend. Coon and Welch also split time between NBC and Motor Racing Network.

Pre and post-race show

- Marty Snider (host)
- Brad Daugherty (rotating analyst)
- Dale Jarrett (rotating analyst)
- Kyle Petty (rotating analyst)
- Jeff Burton (rotating analyst)
- Steve Letarte (rotating analyst)

ARCA Menards Series East and West

- Charles Krall (play-by-play)
2022

NASCAR Cup Series
Booth announcers

- Rick Allen (lap-by-lap, all races except New Hampshire and Michigan)
- Steve Letarte (color commentator, all races except Phoenix)
- Jeff Burton (color commentator)
- Dale Earnhardt Jr. (color commentator)
- Mike Bagley (commentator for radio-style broadcasts at the road course races)

Pit reporters

- Dave Burns
- Kim Coon
- Parker Kligerman
- Marty Snider
- Dillon Welch

Cityview reporter

- Rutledge Wood (select races)

Pre and post-race show

- Marty Snider (host)
- Dale Jarrett (rotating analyst)
- Kyle Petty (rotating analyst)
- Brad Daugherty (rotating analyst starting at Michigan in 2020 and 2021)

NASCAR Xfinity Series
Booth announcers

- Rick Allen (lap-by-lap, most races)
- Dave Burns (lap–by–lap at Darlington)
- Steve Letarte (color commentator, most races)
- Jeff Burton (color commentator, most races)
- Dale Earnhardt Jr. (color commentator, most races)
- Mike Bagley (commentator for radio-style broadcasts at the road course races)
- Brad Daugherty (alternate color commentator)
- James Hinchcliffe (alternate color commentator)
- Dale Jarrett (alternate color commentator)

Pit reporters

- Dave Burns
- Kim Coon
- Parker Kligerman
- Marty Snider
- Dillon Welch

Pre and post-race show

- Marty Snider (host)
- Dale Jarrett (rotating analyst)
- Kyle Petty (rotating analyst)
- Brad Daugherty (rotating analyst)

ARCA Menards Series East and West

- Charlie Krall (play-by-play)
- Adam Mackey (color commentator)
- Jessie Punch (pit reporter)
- Rick Allen (pre and post-race show host)
Krall also commentated the pre and post-race shows himself at Dover and Irwindale in Rick Allen's absence.

== Former commentators ==
- Rick Allen – lead play-by-play announcer for the Cup and Xfinity Series (2015–2024) After NBC's first 8 Cup Series races in 2024, NBC replaced him with Leigh Diffey, their former IndyCar play-by-play, after NBC lost the TV rights for IndyCar to Fox. Allen would finish the year as their Xfinity Series play-by-play only. Now works for the Carolina Panthers as a PA announcer, The CW as a college football alternate play-by-play and as an alternate CARS Tour play-by-play
- Mike Bagley – commentator for the radio-style broadcasts on road courses (2017–2019, 2021–2024)
- Allen Bestwick – play-by-play announcer (1999–2004), pit reporter (2005–2006)
- Ato Boldon – roving reporter (2017)
- Landon Cassill – fill-in Xfinity Series pit reporter (2018)
- Jac Collinsworth – pre-race show host/roving reporter (2021)
- Bob Costas – guest host for pre-race show at Cup race at Homestead only (2017)
- Lindsay Czarniak – fill-in pit reporter for standalone Busch Series races (2005–2006) Czarniak still works for NBC covering the Summer Olympics in 2021 and the Winter Olympics in 2022.
- Wally Dallenbach Jr. – color commentator (2001–2006) Dallenbach also returned to NBC for a cameo appearance on the pre-race show of the 2020 Cup Series race at the Daytona Road Course.
- Dale Earnhardt Jr. – color commentator for the Cup and Xfinity Series (2018–2023). he left to join Amazon and TNT's broadcast teams starting in 2025 at the start of the next NASCAR Cup Series TV contract.
- Carl Edwards – color commentator for Xfinity Series race at Richmond only (2015)
- Ray Evernham – alternate Xfinity Series color commentator (2015)
- Brendan Gaughan – fill-in Xfinity Series pit reporter (2018)
- Joe Gibbs – color commentator (1999)
- Alex Hayden – fill-in pit reporter for standalone Xfinity Series races (2015–2016)
- James Hinchcliffe – alternate Xfinity Series color commentator (2022) and studio analyst at Indianapolis (2023). He moved over to Fox in 2025, continuing as an IndyCar TV color commentator after NBC lost the TV rights for the IndyCar Series to Fox.
- Ned Jarrett – guest color commentator at Darlington only (2015–2017)
- Jimmie Johnson – rotating analyst on a few Cup Series pre and post-race shows (2024)
- Parker Kligerman – alternate and permanent pit reporter, Cup and Xfinity Series (2015–2025)
- Kevin Lee – fill-in pit reporter for standalone Xfinity Series races (2018–2019 and 2023). Lee still works for NBC as a pit reporter and play-by-play on their IndyCar coverage and IMSA coverage.
- Carolyn Manno – host of NASCAR Victory Lap (2014–2018). Manno still works for NBC, but is no longer a commentator for NASCAR.
- Mike Massaro – pit reporter (2015–2016)
- Jamie McMurray – color commentator for Xfinity Series race at Chicagoland only (2015)
- Jim Noble – fill-in pit reporter for standalone Xfinity Series races (2015–2016)
- Benny Parsons – color commentator (2000–2006)
- Kyle Petty – pre and post-race show analyst (2015–2025)
- Dorsey Schroeder – pit reporter (1999)
- Ken Squier – guest play-by-play announcer at Darlington only (2015–2017)
- Kelli Stavast – pit reporter (2015–2021)
- Frank Stoddard – alternate Xfinity Series color commentator (2015)
- Danielle Trotta – host of NASCAR Victory Lap (2019)
- Brian Vickers – NASCAR America analyst and rotating/alternate pre/post-race show analyst (2015–2016)
- Krista Voda – host (2015–2020)
- Mike Wallace – color commentator (1999)
- Bill Weber – pre-race show host/pit reporter (2001–2004), pre-race show host/play-by-play announcer (2005–2006). Weber also filled-in for the injured Allen Bestwick as the play-by-play for the races at Talladega and Kansas in 2004.
- Dillon Welch – alternate pit reporter
- Brian Williams – studio host (1999)
- Rutledge Wood – roving reporter (2015–2022). Wood still works for NBC hosting Hot Wheels: Ultimate Challenge
- Matt Yocum – permanent pit reporter (2000–2006), fill-in pit reporter for standalone Xfinity Series race at Road America (2023). Yocum still pit reports IMSA races for NBC.

== See also ==
- List of NASCAR on Fox broadcasters
