= 2017 Indianapolis 500 =

American motor race

101st Indianapolis 500

Indianapolis Motor Speedway

Indianapolis 500
- Sanctioning body: IndyCar
- Season: 2017 IndyCar season
- Date: May 28, 2017
- Winner: (Japan) Takuma Sato
- Winning team: Andretti Autosport
- Winning Chief Mechanic: Rolando Coronado
- Time of race: 3:13:03.3584
- Average speed: 155.395 mph (250.084 km/h)
- Pole position: (New Zealand) Scott Dixon
- Pole speed: 232.164 mph (373.632 km/h)
- Fastest qualifier: (New Zealand) Scott Dixon
- Rookie of the Year: (Spain) Fernando Alonso
- Most laps led: (United Kingdom) Max Chilton (50)

Pre-race ceremonies
- National anthem: Bebe Rexha
- "Back Home Again in Indiana": Jim Cornelison
- Starting command: Tony George
- Pace car: Chevrolet Corvette Grand Sport
- Pace car driver: Jeffrey Dean Morgan
- Two-seater: Mario Andretti (driver); Zedd (passenger)
- Starter: Paul Blevin
- Honorary starter: Jake Gyllenhaal & Jeff Bauman

Television in the United States
- Network: ABC (blacked out locally)
- Announcers: Allen Bestwick, Scott Goodyear, Eddie Cheever
- Nielsen ratings: 3.6

Chronology
Previous	Next
2016	2018

The 2017 Indianapolis 500 (branded as the 101st Running of the Indianapolis 500 presented by PennGrade Motor Oil for sponsorship reasons) was a Verizon IndyCar Series race held on Sunday May 28, 2017, at the Indianapolis Motor Speedway in Speedway, Indiana, United States. The race was the premier event and the sixth race of the 2017 Verizon IndyCar Series season.

Despite a threatening weather forecast in the days leading up to the event, the race ran its scheduled distance of 200 laps (500 miles) and was won by Japanese driver Takuma Sato of Andretti Autosport. Sato, who also finished on the podium at the 2004 U.S. Grand Prix on the road course at Indianapolis, became the first Asian driver to win the Indianapolis 500. Sato assumed the lead with six laps to go and held off Hélio Castroneves over the final fifteen miles.

Two violent crashes occurred during the month, involving Sébastien Bourdais (during time trials) and Scott Dixon (during the race), respectively. Bourdais suffered a broken pelvis and other injuries, forcing him to sit out the event, while Dixon suffered a minor ankle injury.

Alexander Rossi entered the race as the defending champion. The event also featured Fernando Alonso, the first active Formula One World Championship driver to contest the race since Teo Fabi in 1984. Alonso was voted Rookie of the Year, having led 27 laps before retiring in the closing stages of the race.

The month of May activities formally began on May 13 with the fourth running of the IndyCar Grand Prix on the combined road course. Practice for the Indianapolis 500 began on May 15, and time trials were held on May 20–21. Scott Dixon, the 2008 winner, won the pole position, his third career Indy pole. Dixon's qualifying speed of 232.164 mph (373.632 km/h) was the fastest pole speed since 1996. Carb Day—the traditional final day of practice, as well as the annual Pit Stop Challenge and Indy Lights Freedom 100, were held on May 26. Support races featuring the Road to Indy were also held during the month.

== Race background ==
The Indianapolis Motor Speedway is a 2.5-mile oval circuit with four turns banked at 9°.

The 2017 race was the third and final year contested with the Chevrolet and Honda aero kits outfitted to the Dallara DW12 chassis. Beginning in 2018, all DW12 chassis were outfitted with a universal bodywork kit. Furthermore, a development freeze was implemented for 2017, and all aero kits had to adhere to the established specifications carried over from 2016.

Among the major offseason moves, Chip Ganassi Racing switched engine manufactures from Chevrolet to Honda. Conversely, A. J. Foyt Enterprises switched from Honda to Chevrolet. KV Racing Technology, who won the 2013 race with driver Tony Kanaan, was sold to Juncos Racing, an established team in the ladder system, scheduled to make its debut at the Indianapolis 500. After losing his seat at KV Racing, Sébastien Bourdais subsequently signed with Dale Coyne Racing. Among the other high-profile moves, Josef Newgarden departed Ed Carpenter Racing and joined Team Penske.

=== Regulations and rule changes ===
A series of procedural rule changes were implemented by the series for the 2017 season, however, none of the rule changes significantly affected the Indianapolis 500. The IndyCar Grand Prix, which opens the on-track activities for the month, a three-day event, had only two days for the Verizon IndyCar Series. That mirrors similar changes made to other races event weekends on the schedule.

- Each entry was allowed 36 sets of tires (Firestone) total, for practice, time trials, and for the race. This remained the same from 2015 to 2016. The special compound "red" tires are not used for oval events. Entries taking part in the Rookie Orientation Program received an additional three sets for that session, and entries taking part in a refresher test received two additional sets.
- All entries are subject to engine change-out rules. The standard minimum change-out mileage milestone per engine is set at 2,500 miles. Full-time entries are allotted up to two fresh engines for the month of May on-track activities, plus a third engine that is left over from the previous IndyCar Series races. Teams must first mileage-out their engine from the previous races during practice before they can install a fresh engine for Fast Friday practice and/or qualifying. The second fresh engine is intended to be installed for Carb Day and race day, however each team has a certain amount of latitude as to their installation decisions. Both the engine used for Fast Friday/qualifying and the engine used for Carb Day/race day must be re-utilized and properly mileaged out later in the IndyCar season. Unapproved engine changes are subject to penalty. Teams participating in the Pit Stop Challenge are permitted to utilize a back-up car for that event, with one of the older engines installed.
- Engines are permitted 130 kPa of turbocharger "boost" during practice from May 15–18. Cars are allowed 140 kPa of "boost" on Fast Friday practice, and during time trials. The "boost" level reverts to 130 kPa for Carb day and race day.

=== 2017 IndyCar season ===
The 101st Indianapolis 500 was the sixth round of the 2017 Verizon IndyCar Series season, and the 22nd sanctioned as part of the Indy Racing League/IndyCar Series. There were five different winners in the first five races leading up to the Indianapolis 500. The season began March 12 at St. Petersburg, with Sébastien Bourdais a surprise winner. Bourdais won from last place on the starting grid. James Hinchcliffe won at Long Beach, his first victory since suffering a near-fatal accident during practice for 2015 Indianapolis 500. Josef Newgarden won at Barber, and defending series champion Simon Pagenaud won at Phoenix. The IndyCar Grand Prix was won by Will Power, his second victory in the event.

Entering the month of May at Indy, Honda-powered teams were the prohibitive favorites over the Chevys. As the week began, Honda teams were even being accused of "sandbagging." However, each day saw a different driver lead the speed charts, split almost evenly between both manufacturers. Honda began experiencing multiple engine failures, raising significant concerns around the garage area of their reliability.

== Entry list ==
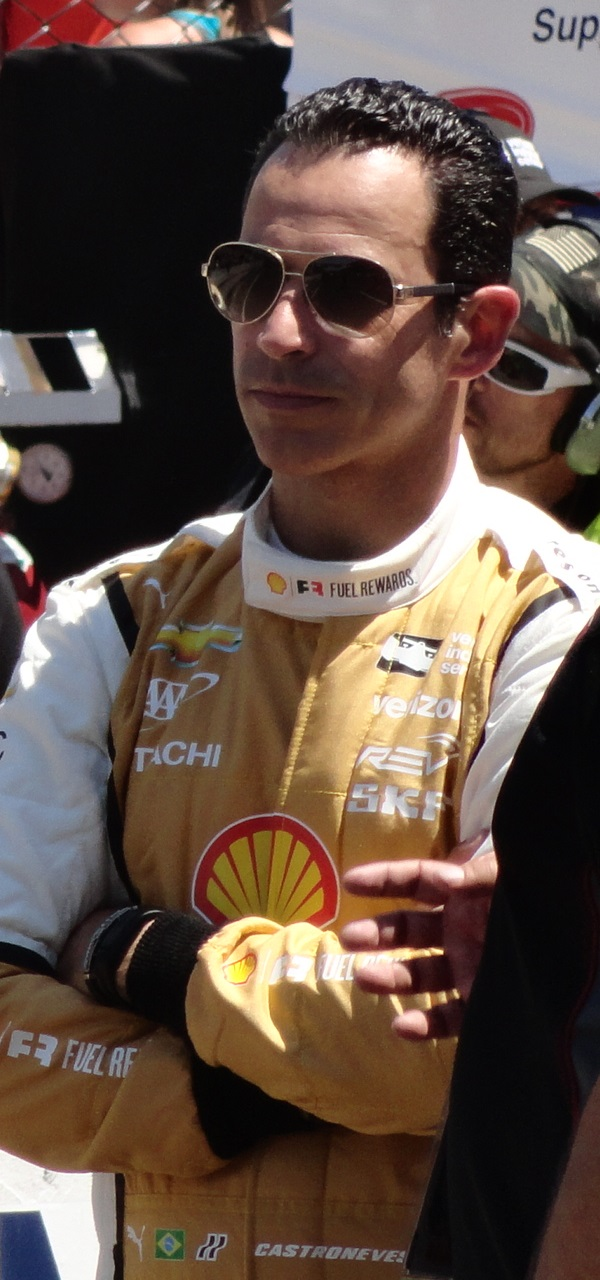
Hélio Castroneves is a three-time winner of the Indianapolis 500 (2001, 2002, 2009) and four-time pole position winner.

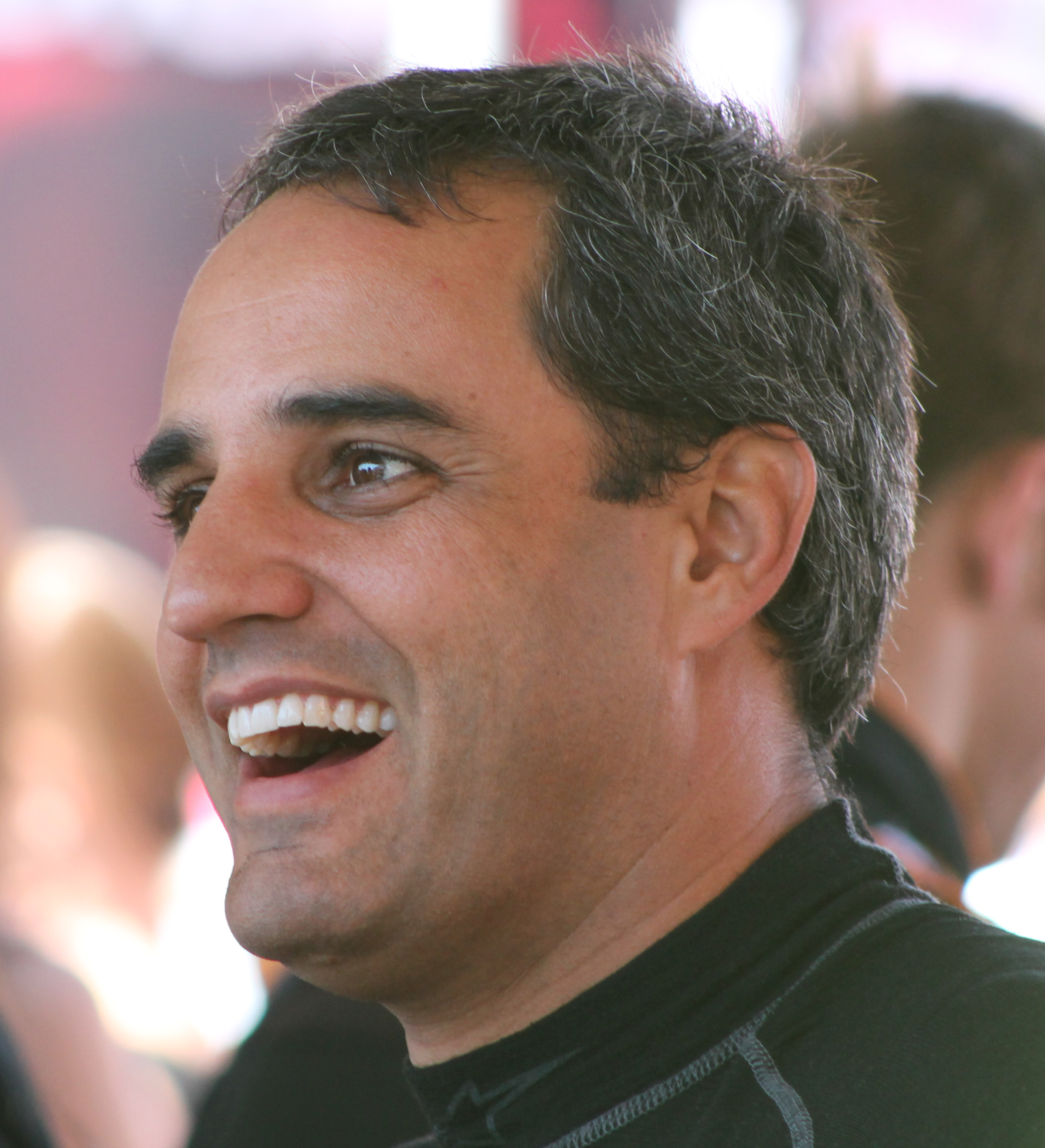
Juan Pablo Montoya is a two-time race winner (2000, 2015).

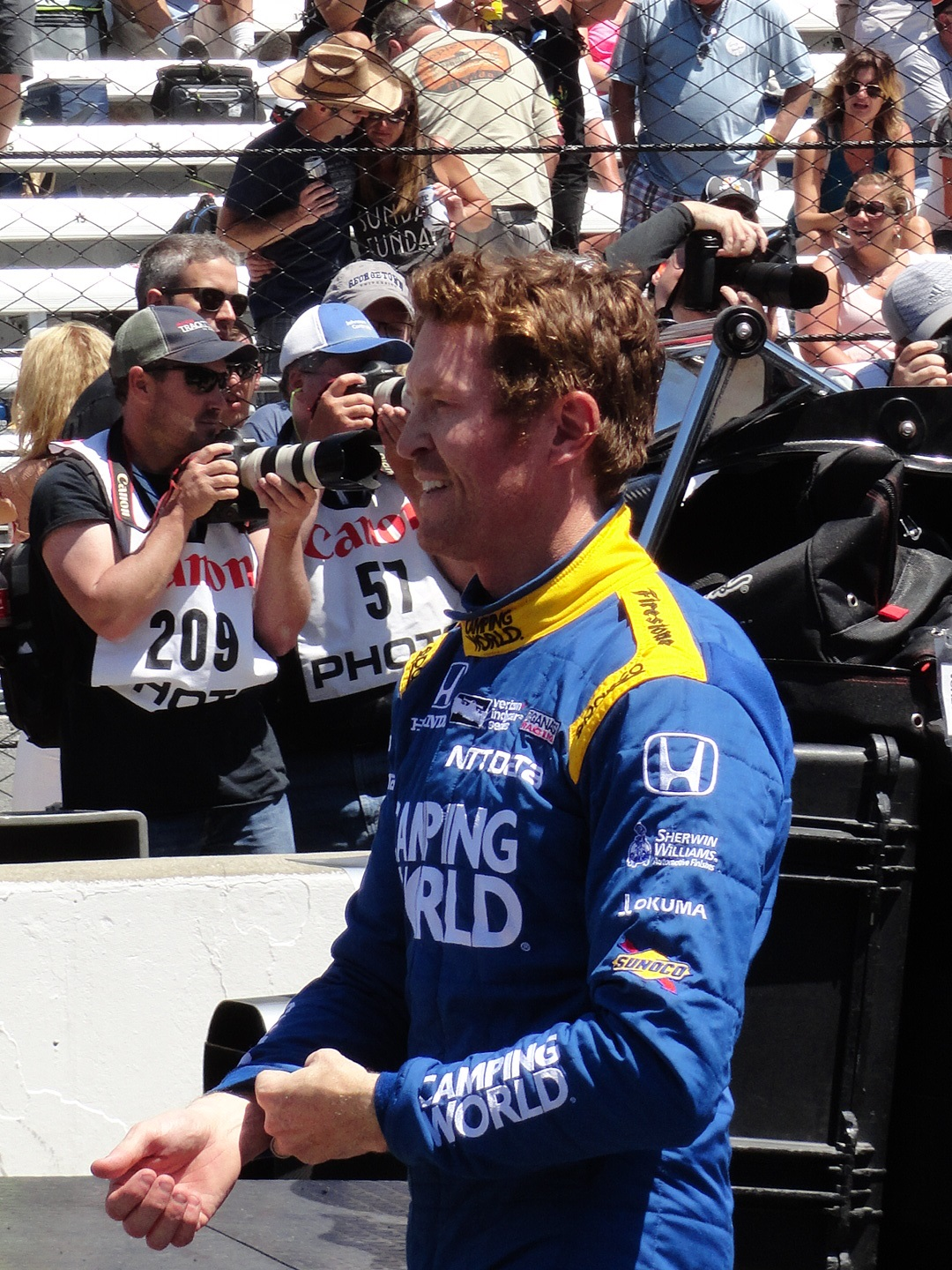
Scott Dixon is a former winner, and two-time former pole winner.

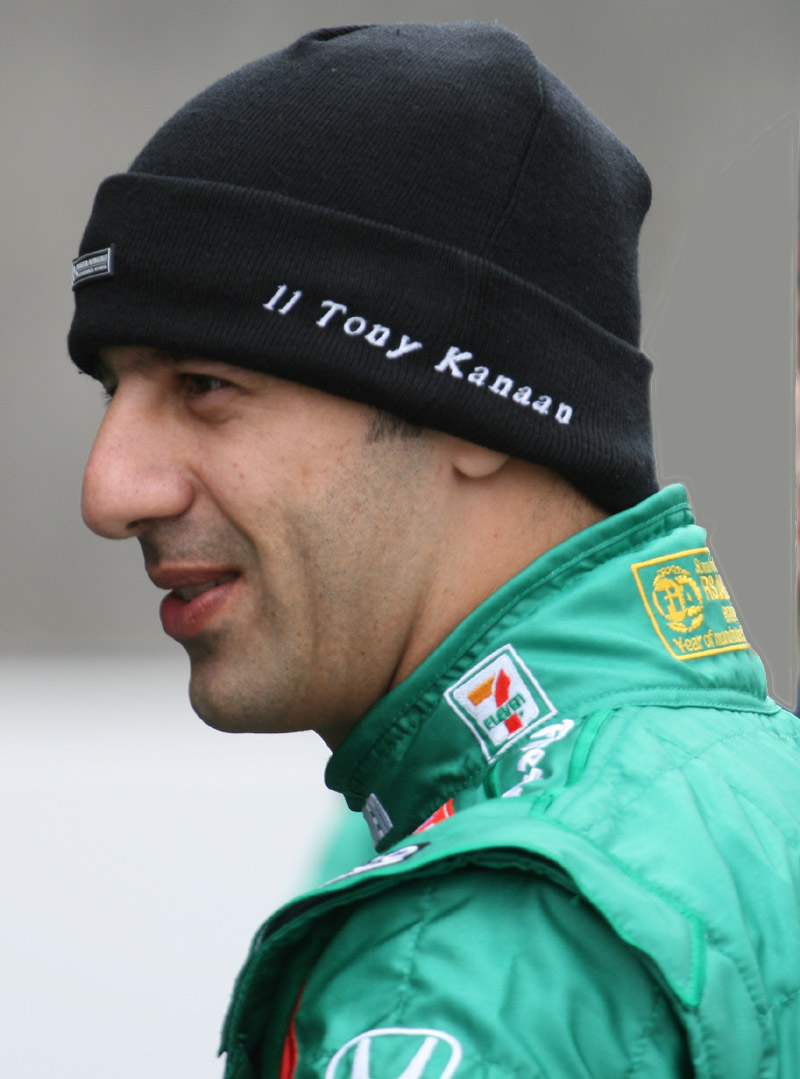
Tony Kanaan is a former race winner and pole winner.

See 2017 IndyCar Series § Teams and drivers for further information.

Former Indianapolis 500 winners that were entered include Hélio Castroneves, Juan Pablo Montoya, Buddy Lazier, Scott Dixon, Tony Kanaan, Ryan Hunter-Reay, and Alexander Rossi. Former IndyCar Series champions that entered include Lazier, Dixon, Kanaan, Hunter-Reay, Will Power and Simon Pagenaud. In addition, Juan Pablo Montoya is a former CART series champion, and Sébastien Bourdais is a four-time champion of the Champ Car World Series. Montoya, after three years in a full-time role at Team Penske, went down to a part-time role for 2017, driving in the IndyCar Grand Prix and Indianapolis 500 only.

On April 12, it was announced that two-time Formula 1 World Champion Fernando Alonso planned to drive a Honda with the support of McLaren for Andretti Autosport. Alonso skipped the 2017 Monaco Grand Prix in order to compete at Indianapolis.

Rookies that entered included Alonso, Jack Harvey, Ed Jones, and Zach Veach. The official entry list was released on May 14.

No.	Driver	Team	Engine
1	(France) Simon Pagenaud	Team Penske	Chevrolet
2	(United States) Josef Newgarden	Team Penske	Chevrolet
3	(Brazil) Hélio Castroneves W	Team Penske	Chevrolet
4	(United States) Conor Daly	A. J. Foyt Enterprises	Chevrolet
5	(Canada) James Hinchcliffe	Schmidt Peterson Motorsports	Honda
7	(Russia) Mikhail Aleshin	Schmidt Peterson Motorsports	Honda
8	(United Kingdom) Max Chilton	Chip Ganassi Racing	Honda
9	(New Zealand) Scott Dixon W	Chip Ganassi Racing	Honda
10	(Brazil) Tony Kanaan W	Chip Ganassi Racing	Honda
11	(United States) Spencer Pigot	Juncos Racing	Chevrolet
12	(Australia) Will Power	Team Penske	Chevrolet
14	(Colombia) Carlos Muñoz	A. J. Foyt Enterprises	Chevrolet
15	(United States) Graham Rahal	Rahal Letterman Lanigan Racing	Honda
16	(Spain) Oriol Servià	Rahal Letterman Lanigan Racing	Honda
17	(Colombia) Sebastián Saavedra	Juncos Racing	Chevrolet
18	(France) Sébastien Bourdais (replaced by (Australia) James Davison)	Dale Coyne Racing	Honda
19	(United Arab Emirates) Ed Jones R	Dale Coyne Racing	Honda
20	(United States) Ed Carpenter	Ed Carpenter Racing	Chevrolet
21	(United States) J. R. Hildebrand	Ed Carpenter Racing	Chevrolet
22	(Colombia) Juan Pablo Montoya W	Team Penske	Chevrolet
24	(United States) Sage Karam	Dreyer & Reinbold Racing	Chevrolet
26	(Japan) Takuma Sato	Andretti Autosport	Honda
27	(United States) Marco Andretti	Andretti Autosport with Yorrow	Honda
28	(United States) Ryan Hunter-Reay W	Andretti Autosport	Honda
29	(Spain) Fernando Alonso R	McLaren-Honda-Andretti	Honda
40	(United States) Zach Veach R	A. J. Foyt Enterprises	Chevrolet
44	(United States) Buddy Lazier W	Lazier Racing Partners	Chevrolet
50	(United Kingdom) Jack Harvey R	Michael Shank Racing with Andretti Autosport	Honda
63	(United Kingdom) Pippa Mann	Dale Coyne Racing	Honda
77	(United Kingdom) Jay Howard	Schmidt Peterson Motorsports	Honda
83	(United States) Charlie Kimball	Chip Ganassi Racing	Honda
88	(Colombia) Gabby Chaves	Harding Racing	Chevrolet
98	(United States) Alexander Rossi W	Andretti Herta Autosport with Curb Agajanian	Honda
OFFICIAL REPORT

- W Former winner
- R Indy 500 Rookie

== Schedule ==
Race schedules — May 2017
Sun	Mon	Tue	Wed	Thu	Fri	Sat
	1	2	3 Testing	4	5	6 Mini-Marathon
7	8	9	10	11; Road to Indy; Practice	12; Grand Prix; Qualifying	13; IndyCar; Grand Prix
14	15; ROP; Practice	16; Practice	17; Practice	18; Practice	19; Practice; Fast Friday	20; Time Trials
21; Time Trials	22; Practice; Indy Lights Test	23	24	25; Indy Lights; Qualifying	26; Carb Day; Freedom 100	27; Legends Day; Parade
28; Indianapolis; 500	29; Memorial; Day	30	31			

Color	Notes
Green	Practice
Dark Blue	Time trials
Silver	Race day
Red	Rained out*
Blank	No track activity

* Includes days where track
activity was significantly limited due to rain

- Sources: 101st Running of the Indy 500 presented by PennGrade Motor Oil Event Schedule & Road to Indy.

== Testing and rookie orientation ==
=== Private testing – Friday, March 24 ===
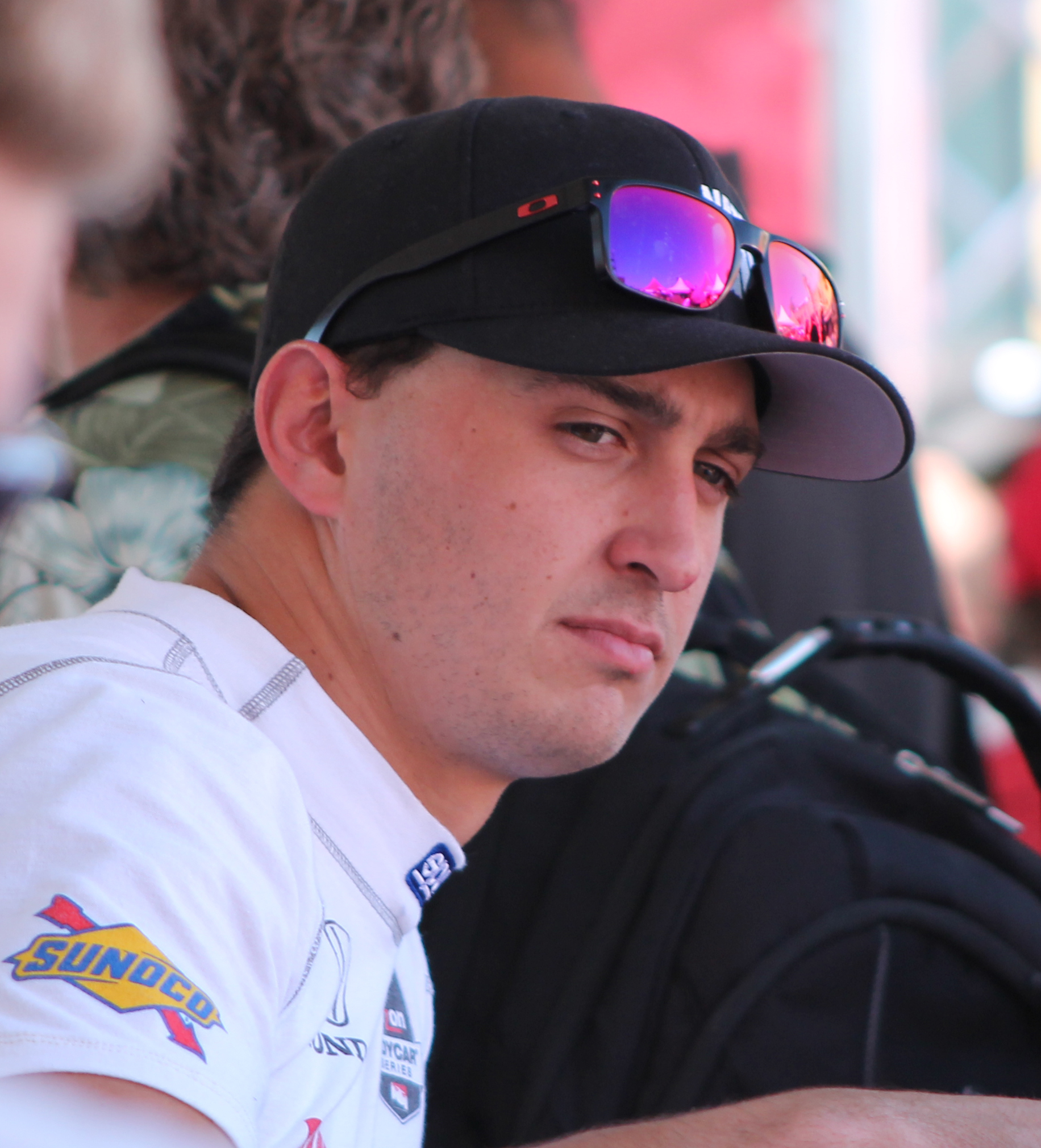
Graham Rahal, one of the Honda entries, participated in the first private test.

A private manufacturers test for Honda teams was scheduled for Friday March 24. The test was moved up one day due to inclement weather predicted for Saturday. Three Honda teams, Chip Ganassi Racing, Rahal Letterman Lanigan Racing, and Schmidt Peterson Motorsports, tested along with one Chevy team (Team Penske). A total of eleven drivers took to the track on a warm, but windy day. No incidents were reported. Speeds were not reported. Attention during the test focused on Ganassi taking their first laps at the Speedway with Honda power since 2013, after a highly publicized switch from Chevrolet to Honda during the offseason.

Private testing — Participants
No.	Driver	Team	Engine
1	(France) Simon Pagenaud	Team Penske	Chevrolet
2	(United States) Josef Newgarden	Team Penske	Chevrolet
3	(Brazil) Hélio Castroneves	Team Penske	Chevrolet
5	(Canada) James Hinchcliffe	Schmidt Peterson Motorsports	Honda
7	(Russia) Mikhail Aleshin	Schmidt Peterson Motorsports	Honda
8	(United Kingdom) Max Chilton	Chip Ganassi Racing	Honda
9	(New Zealand) Scott Dixon	Chip Ganassi Racing	Honda
10	(Brazil) Tony Kanaan	Chip Ganassi Racing	Honda
12	(Australia) Will Power	Team Penske	Chevrolet
15	(United States) Graham Rahal	Rahal Letterman Lanigan Racing	Honda
83	(United States) Charlie Kimball	Chip Ganassi Racing	Honda

=== Private testing – Sunday, April 2 ===
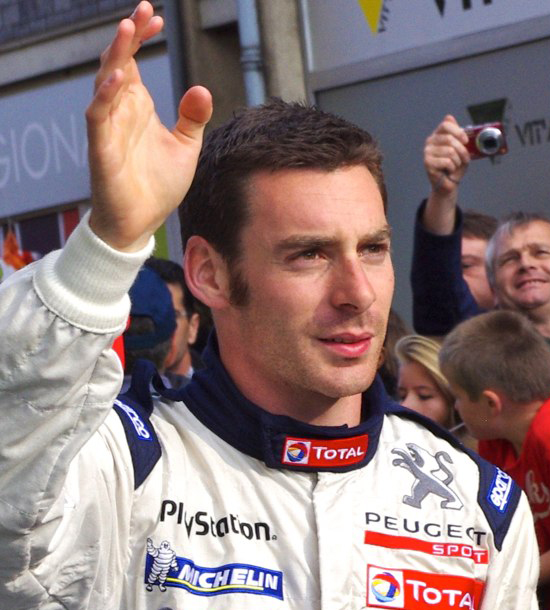
Simon Pagenaud was among the drivers who participated in testing.

A private test conducted by Chevrolet teams was scheduled for Saturday April 1. Cold temperatures postponed the test until Sunday April 2. Three Chevrolet teams were scheduled to participate. No incidents were reported.

Private testing — Participants
No.	Driver	Team	Engine
1	(France) Simon Pagenaud	Team Penske	Chevrolet
2	(United States) Josef Newgarden	Team Penske	Chevrolet
3	(Brazil) Hélio Castroneves	Team Penske	Chevrolet
4	(United States) Conor Daly	A. J. Foyt Enterprises	Chevrolet
12	(Australia) Will Power	Team Penske	Chevrolet
14	(Colombia) Carlos Muñoz	A. J. Foyt Enterprises	Chevrolet
20	(United States) Ed Carpenter	Ed Carpenter Racing	Chevrolet
21	(United States) J. R. Hildebrand	Ed Carpenter Racing	Chevrolet

=== Private testing – Wednesday May 3 ===
A private test was scheduled for May 3 involving Fernando Alonso. Marco Andretti started the day off, shaking the car down shortly after 9:00 a.m. Alonso took to the track and passed all three phases of his rookie test. Alonso completed 110 laps with a best lap of 222.548 mph. Due to rain approaching the area, the test schedule for the day was slightly compressed, in order to complete all three phases before the weather arrived. The test was broadcast as a live stream through IndyCar's social media channels, with combined live viewership of the test was estimated to be in excess of 2 million.

Private test — Participant
No.	Driver	Team	Engine
29	(Spain) Fernando Alonso R	McLaren-Honda-Andretti	Honda

=== Rookie orientation – Monday May 15 ===
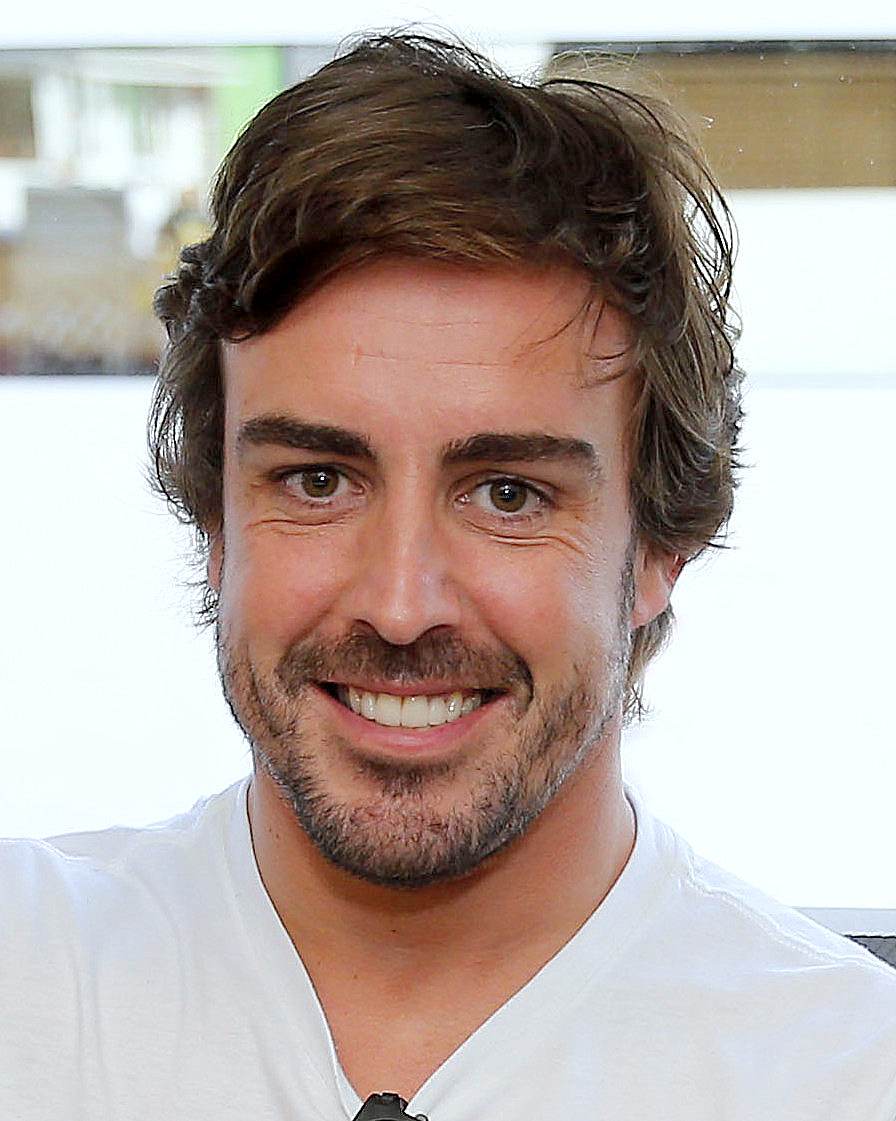
Fernando Alonso completed the three-phase rookie test on May 3 during a private test session.

The Rookie Orientation Program (ROP) was scheduled for Monday from 12:00 p.m. to 2:00 p.m. Four rookies were slated to participate in the session, Fernando Alonso, Jack Harvey, Ed Jones, and Zach Veach. Track time for refresher tests was also available for Jay Howard, Oriol Servià, and Sebastián Saavedra. The three-phase rookie test requirements for 2017 consisted of ten laps at 205-210 mph, fifteen laps at 210-215 mph, and fifteen laps at over 215 mph. The two-phase refresher test consists of ten laps at 210-215 mph and fifteen laps at over 215 mph.

Alonso had passed his rookie test previously on May 3, but was permitted the additional track time during the session. Ed Jones passed his rookie test at 1:08 p.m., while Jack Harvey experienced gearbox trouble, which delayed him taking to the track for almost one hour. Harvey passed only the first phase of the test after fuel pressure issues sidelined him even further. Veach made no attempt to complete his rookie program, turning in only three laps late in the session. Veterans Howard, Servià, and Saavedra all completed their refresher programs during this time.

Top Practice Speeds — Rookie Orientation & Refresher Tests
Pos	No.	Driver	Team	Engine	Speed
1	29	(Spain) Fernando Alonso R	McLaren-Honda-Andretti	Honda	221.634
2	16	(Spain) Oriol Servià	Rahal Letterman Lanigan Racing	Honda	220.759
3	19	(United Arab Emirates) Ed Jones R	Dale Coyne Racing	Honda	219.288
OFFICIAL REPORT

== Practice ==
=== Monday, May 15 ===
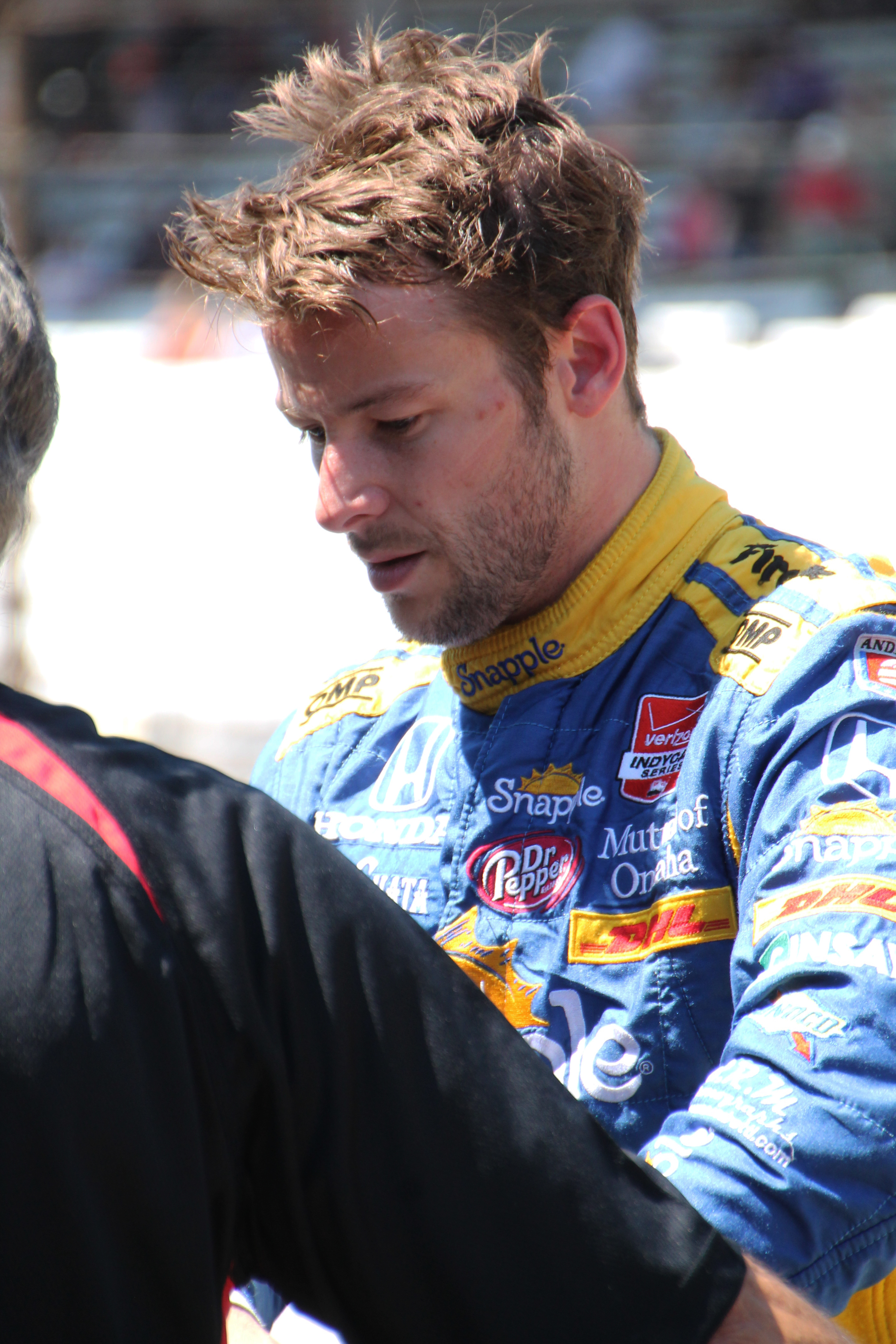
Marco Andretti led practice on May 15.

- Weather: 83 °F (28 °C), Sunny
- Practice summary: Veteran practice was scheduled from 2:00 p.m. to 6:00 p.m. The green flag came out just after 2 p.m., and Juan Pablo Montoya earned the distinction of first car out on the track and first driver to complete a lap. At roughly 4:00 p.m., Jack Harvey became the first driver to crash during practice when a mechanical failure caused him to drift out of the warm-up lane and into the turn 2 wall. Harvey was uninjured in the incident. Graham Rahal suffered an engine failure just past 5:00 p.m., bringing his day to an end early as well. Marco Andretti led the speed charts for the day, with a fast lap at 226.338 mph. Ed Carpenter was the fastest of cars running Chevrolet engines, with a speed of 224.969 mph; good enough for third place overall. Honda dominated the day, however, placing eight cars in the top ten. The fastest "no-tow" lap for the day was turned in by Tony Kanaan in a Honda at 223.554 mph.

Top Practice Speeds — Practice
Pos	No.	Driver	Team	Engine	Speed
1	27	(United States) Marco Andretti	Andretti Autosport with Yorrow	Honda	226.338
2	9	(New Zealand) Scott Dixon	Chip Ganassi Racing	Honda	225.296
3	20	(United States) Ed Carpenter	Ed Carpenter Racing	Chevrolet	224.969
OFFICIAL REPORT

=== Tuesday, May 16 ===
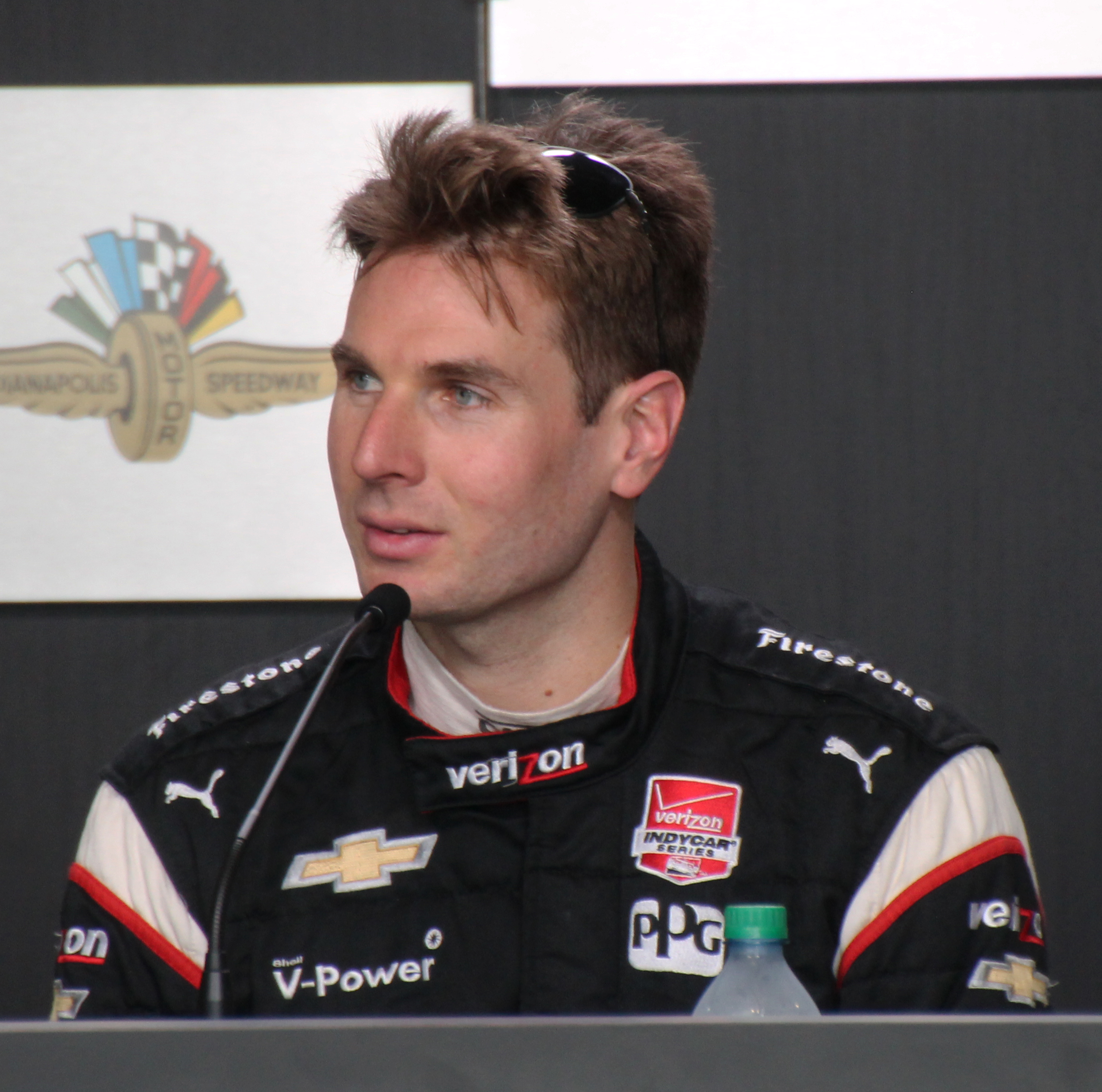
Will Power went fastest on May 16.

- Weather: 86 °F (30 °C), Sunny and windy
- Practice summary: Warmer temperatures and stronger winds kept speeds lower than the previous day. During the session, Zach Veach and Jack Harvey both completed their rookie orientation programs. Chevrolet engines proved quicker on the day, taking the top three spots and seven out of the top ten. Will Power of Team Penske turned the fastest lap of the day at 224.656 mph. Ed Carpenter held the fastest "no-tow" lap, with a speed of 222.842 mph. No major incidents occurred during the session.

Top Practice Speeds — Practice
Pos	No.	Driver	Team	Engine	Speed
1	12	(Australia) Will Power	Team Penske	Chevrolet	224.656
2	3	(Brazil) Hélio Castroneves	Team Penske	Chevrolet	224.287
3	88	(Colombia) Gabby Chaves	Harding Racing	Chevrolet	223.991
OFFICIAL REPORT

=== Wednesday, May 17 ===
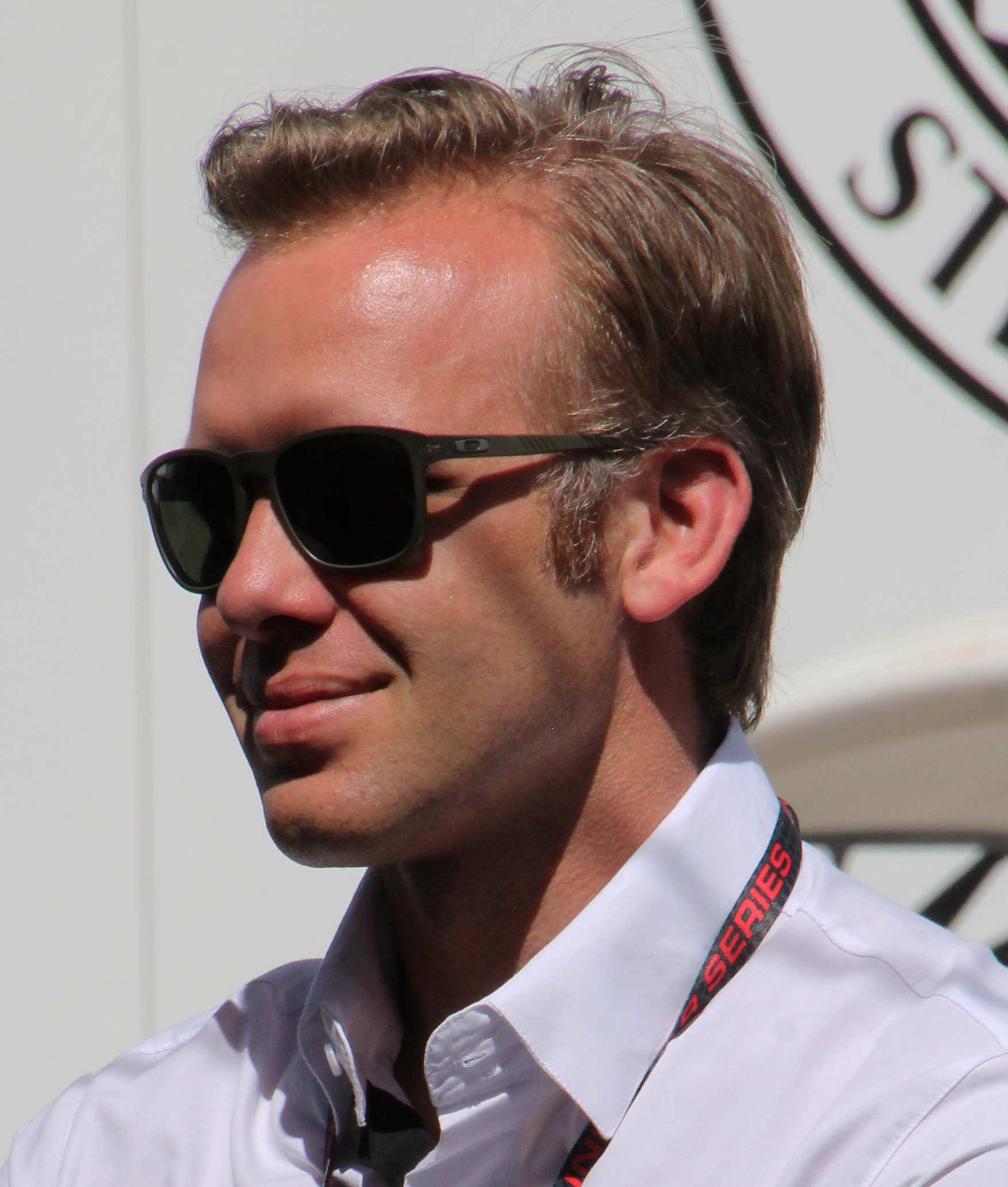
Ed Carpenter held the fastest overall and "no-tow" lap on Wednesday

- Weather: 83 °F (28 °C), Partly cloudy with sustained winds at 25-30 mph, and gusts up to 45 mph.
- Practice summary: Gusty winds kept most cars off the track, as only 21 drivers took to the track, completing only 408 laps. Only 14 drivers attempted any laps at speed, the remaining seven drivers took only a handful of installation laps, some concentrating on pit stop practice. Team Penske parked their cars for the day, and Fernando Alonso was the only Andretti Autosport driver to take any laps at speed. Ed Carpenter (222.894 mph) was the fastest driver of the day, both overall and with "no-tow".

Top Practice Speeds — Practice
Pos	No.	Driver	Team	Engine	Speed
1	20	(United States) Ed Carpenter	Ed Carpenter Racing	Chevrolet	222.894
2	9	(New Zealand) Scott Dixon	Chip Ganassi Racing	Honda	222.599
3	21	(United States) J. R. Hildebrand	Ed Carpenter Racing	Chevrolet	220.553
OFFICIAL REPORT

=== Thursday, May 18 ===
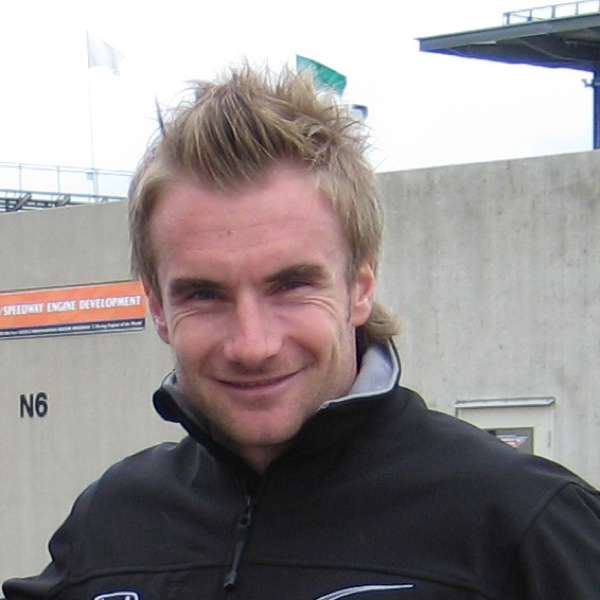
Jay Howard set the fastest time of month up to May 18

- Weather: 86 °F (30 °C), Mostly sunny
- Practice summary: For the first time during the month, all 33 entries turned in at least an installation lap, as Buddy Lazier appeared on track for the first time. The first major crash of the month occurred just after 1:00 p.m., when Josef Newgarden lost control of his car in turn 1 and crashed hard into the outside wall. One further incident occurred later in the session, when Sébastien Bourdais's engine failed on the backstraight, the second Honda engine failure in three days of practice. Jay Howard was fastest of the day, setting a lap of 226.744 mph; the fastest of the month thus far. Takuma Sato (224.734 mph) set the fastest "no-tow" lap of the day.

Top Practice Speeds — Practice
Pos	No.	Driver	Team	Engine	Speed
1	77	(United Kingdom) Jay Howard	Schmidt Peterson Motorsports	Honda	226.744
2	28	(United States) Ryan Hunter-Reay	Andretti Autosport	Honda	225.826
3	27	(United States) Marco Andretti	Andretti Autosport with Yorrow	Honda	225.709
OFFICIAL REPORT

=== Fast Friday — Friday, May 19 ===
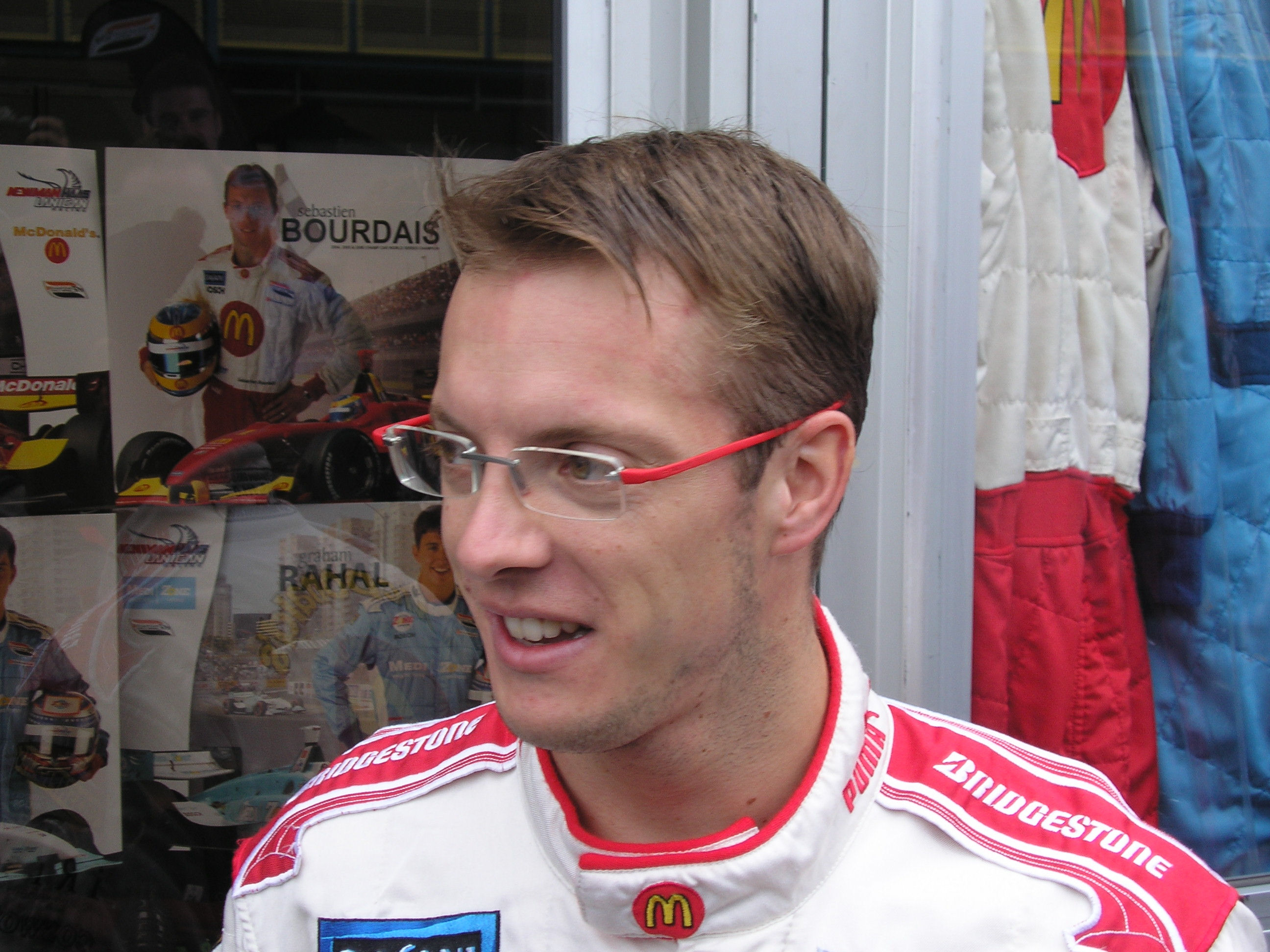
Sebastien Bourdais led the speed chart on "Fast Friday".

- Weather: 77 °F (25 °C), Thunderstorms in early afternoon
- Practice summary: An eventful final day of practice saw over two and a half hours lost due to rain, and two major crashes. Fast Friday practice began on time at 12 noon, with a threat of rain approaching. Entries were permitted 140 kPa of turbocharger "boost", up from 130 kPa earlier in the week. A busy first hour saw Sébastien Bourdais set a fast lap of 233.116 mph, while Ryan Hunter-Reay set the fastest "no-tow" lap at 231.273 mph. Jack Harvey blew an engine after only 11 laps, the fifth Honda engine failure for the week. A heavy thunderstorm shut the track down at 1:30 p.m., but pushed through the area quickly, and the track re-opened at 4:30 p.m. During the later session, two separate crashes involved Spencer Pigot and Zach Veach. Neither driver was injured, but both cars were heavily damaged. Following the conclusion of practice, the qualifying draw was held in the Pagoda Plaza.

Top Practice Speeds — Practice
Pos	No.	Driver	Team	Engine	Speed
1	18	(France) Sébastien Bourdais	Dale Coyne Racing	Honda	233.116
2	28	(United States) Ryan Hunter-Reay	Andretti Autosport	Honda	232.132
3	26	(Japan) Takuma Sato	Andretti Autosport	Honda	231.969
OFFICIAL REPORT

== Time trials first day ==
=== First Day — Saturday, May 20 ===
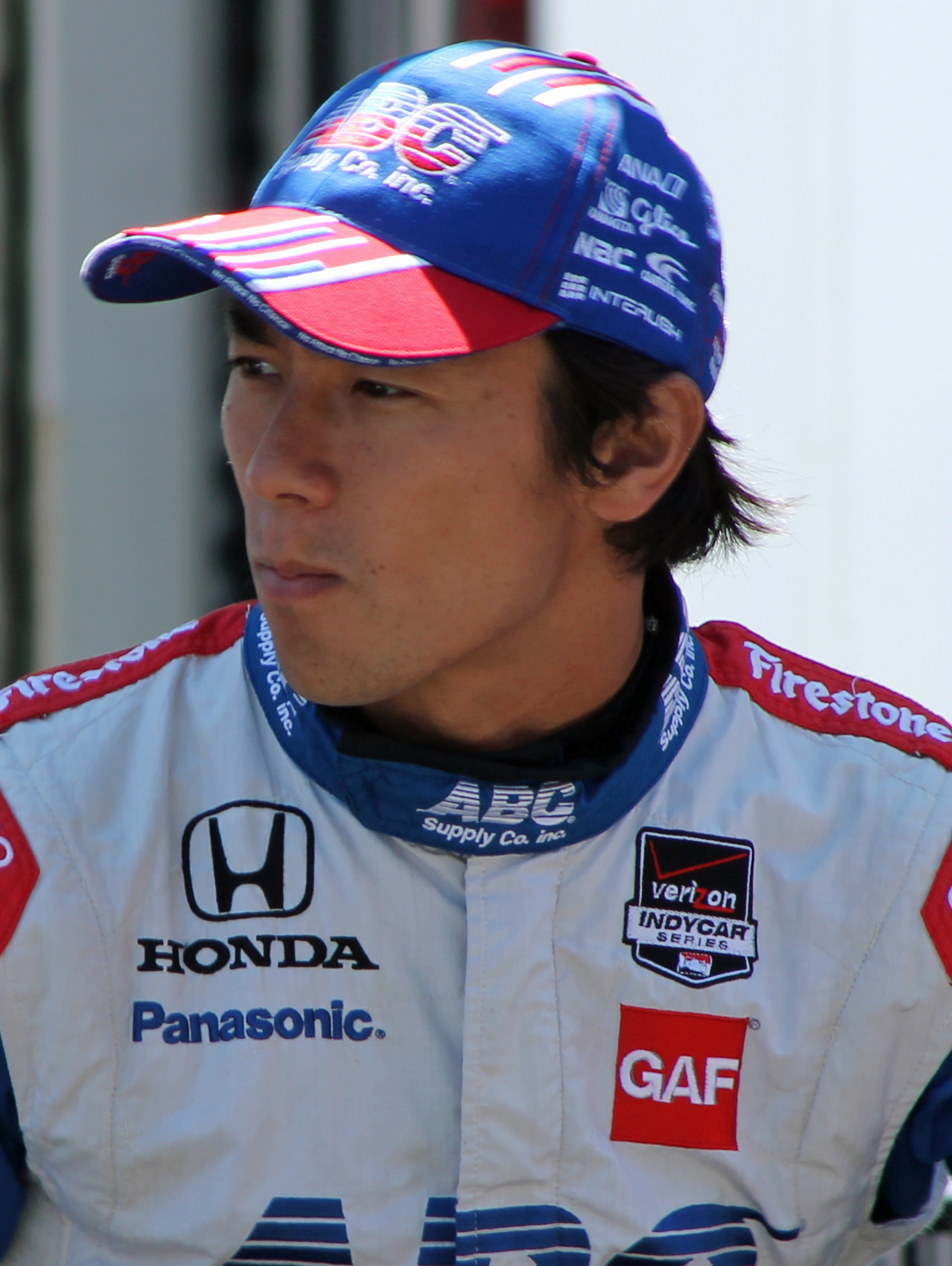
Takuma Sato made the Fast Nine Shootout.

- Weather: 81 °F (27 °C), Heavy rain in late morning and early afternoon, partly cloudy later

The first day of time trials locks in the 33 cars that will comprise the starting field, and determines the nine cars eligible to participate in the Fast Nine Shootout for the pole position on Sunday. The start of qualifications was delayed until 4:01 p.m. due to a heavy thunderstorm. As a result of the delays, all drivers were given only one qualifying attempt.

==== Sébastien Bourdais crash ====
The day was marred by a heavy accident involving Sébastien Bourdais. After completing his first two laps at 231.472 mph and 231.595 mph (the two fastest laps of the day), Bourdais lost control and crashed nearly head-on into the SAFER Barrier in turn two and did a half-flip before coming to rest upright part-way down the backstretch. Bourdais was extracted from his car and immediately sent to Indiana University Health Methodist Hospital where he was diagnosed with multiple pelvic fractures and a hip fracture, rendering him unable to compete in the race.

==== Remainder of day 1 ====
Despite Honda's dominance in the speed charts during the week, it was Chevrolet driver Ed Carpenter who turned the fastest attempt of the day, with a four lap average of 230.468 mph. Joining him in the Fast Nine were Takuma Sato, Scott Dixon, J. R. Hildebrand, Alexander Rossi, Will Power, Fernando Alonso, Tony Kanaan, and Marco Andretti. Rookie Ed Jones was the first driver outside the Fast Nine. Team Penske was surprisingly lackluster during the session, with four of the team's five drivers failing to make the Fast Nine; Power being the lone exception. Rookie Zach Veach made no attempt to qualify on the day due to damage from a crash in the previous day's practice. The only other minor incident of the day involved Pippa Mann, the first car out to qualify on the green track. After a clean first lap, the car stepped out in turn three and nearly tagged the wall in the north short chute. Mann's last three laps dropped off substantially, but she completed the four-lap run 219.282 mph, the slowest car of the day.

Pos.	No.	Driver	Team	Engine	Speed
Fast Nine Qualifiers
1	20	(United States) Ed Carpenter	Ed Carpenter Racing	Chevrolet	230.468
2	26	(Japan) Takuma Sato	Andretti Autosport	Honda	230.382
3	9	(New Zealand) Scott Dixon W	Chip Ganassi Racing	Honda	230.333
4	21	(United States) J. R. Hildebrand	Ed Carpenter Racing	Chevrolet	230.205
5	98	(United States) Alexander Rossi W	Andretti Herta Autosport	Honda	230.148
6	12	(Australia) Will Power	Team Penske	Chevrolet	230.072
7	29	(Spain) Fernando Alonso R	Andretti Autosport	Honda	230.034
8	10	(Brazil) Tony Kanaan W	Chip Ganassi Racing	Honda	230.007
9	27	(United States) Marco Andretti	Andretti Autosport with Yorrow	Honda	229.924
Positions 10–33
10	19	(United Arab Emirates) Ed Jones R	Dale Coyne Racing	Honda	229.717
11	83	(United States) Charlie Kimball	Chip Ganassi Racing	Honda	229.713
12	8	(United Kingdom) Max Chilton	Chip Ganassi Racing	Honda	229.636
13	28	(United States) Ryan Hunter-Reay W	Andretti Autosport	Honda	229.533
14	3	(Brazil) Hélio Castroneves W	Team Penske	Chevrolet	229.390
15	7	(Russia) Mikhail Aleshin	Schmidt Peterson Motorsports	Honda	229.217
16	15	(United States) Graham Rahal	Rahal Letterman Lanigan Racing	Honda	228.835
17	2	(United States) Josef Newgarden	Team Penske	Chevrolet	228.696
18	22	(Colombia) Juan Pablo Montoya W	Team Penske	Chevrolet	228.645
19	5	(Canada) James Hinchcliffe	Schmidt Peterson Motorsports	Honda	228.557
20	1	(France) Simon Pagenaud	Team Penske	Chevrolet	228.393
21	24	(United States) Sage Karam	Dreyer & Reinbold Racing	Chevrolet	227.943
22	77	(United Kingdom) Jay Howard	Schmidt Peterson Motorsports	Honda	227.853
23	14	(Colombia) Carlos Muñoz	A. J. Foyt Enterprises	Chevrolet	227.438
24	16	(Spain) Oriol Servià	Rahal Letterman Lanigan Racing	Honda	227.150
25	50	(United Kingdom) Jack Harvey R	Andretti Autosport	Honda	226.894
26	88	(Colombia) Gabby Chaves	Harding Racing	Chevrolet	226.875
27	4	(United States) Conor Daly	A. J. Foyt Enterprises	Chevrolet	225.912
28	17	(Colombia) Sebastián Saavedra	Juncos Racing	Chevrolet	225.815
29	11	(United States) Spencer Pigot	Juncos Racing	Chevrolet	223.631
30	44	(United States) Buddy Lazier W	Lazier Partners Racing	Chevrolet	221.427
31	63	(United Kingdom) Pippa Mann	Dale Coyne Racing	Honda	219.282
	18	(France) Sébastien Bourdais	Dale Coyne Racing	Honda	Crash
	40	(United States) Zach Veach R	A. J. Foyt Enterprises	Chevrolet	No Attempt
OFFICIAL REPORT

== Time trials second day ==
=== Positions 33 through 10 — Sunday, May 21 ===
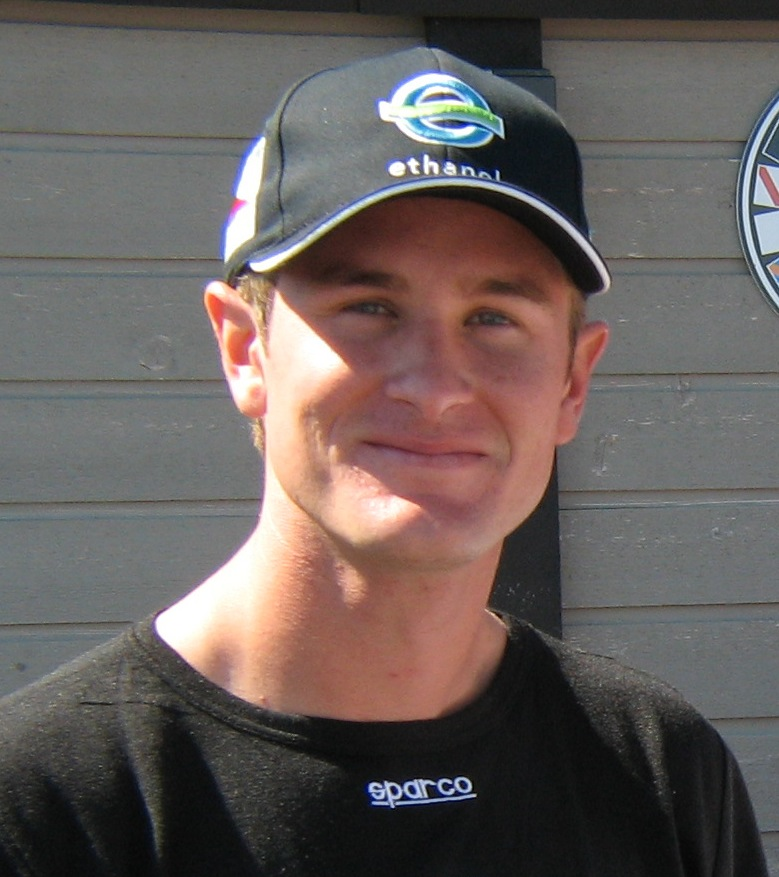
Ryan Hunter-Reay led the 10th-33rd group of qualifiers.

- Weather: 74 °F (23 °C), Showers in morning, mostly sunny in afternoon
- Qualifying Summary (Positions 10–33):

Early showers slightly delayed the morning warm-up session, but the skies stayed clear for the rest of the day and qualifying was run as scheduled. Prior to qualifying, Dale Coyne Racing announced that James Davison would fill in for the injured Bourdais in the No. 18 car. As Davison had not driven in a Verizon IndyCar Series race since 2015, he was prohibited from participating in Sunday's qualifying session under Rule 4.3.8.7, an Indianapolis 500-specific rule mandating a driver who had not participated in an oval race prior to the previous year's Indianapolis 500 pass the refresher test (the second and third phases of the rookie test). Furthermore, the backup #18 car needed to be converted from road course to oval trim.

The group from positions 10-33 began qualifying first at 2:45 p.m., running in the reverse order of how drivers qualified in the previous day's session. Zach Veach, having made no attempt on Saturday, was first on course. The day saw, for most drivers, faster speeds thanks to lower temperatures and more rubber on the track than the previous day. Ryan Hunter-Reay was fastest of the session with a four-lap average of 231.442 mph; nearly a full mph faster than anyone else in the first group. Alongside him in the 4th row were Ed Jones and Oriol Servià. Team Penske once again struggled, with Juan Pablo Montoya in 18th being their highest qualifier in the group. No major incidents occurred during the session, though a few drivers, including Jack Harvey and Charlie Kimball, scraped the wall in turn 2 during their runs.

Pos.	No.	Driver	Team	Engine	Speed
Positions 10–33
10	28	(United States) Ryan Hunter-Reay W	Andretti Autosport	Honda	231.442
11	19	(United Arab Emirates) Ed Jones R	Dale Coyne Racing	Honda	230.578
12	16	(Spain) Oriol Servià	Rahal Letterman Lanigan Racing	Honda	230.309
13	7	(Russia) Mikhail Aleshin	Schmidt Peterson Motorsports	Honda	230.271
14	15	(United States) Graham Rahal	Rahal Letterman Lanigan Racing	Honda	230.253
15	8	(United Kingdom) Max Chilton	Chip Ganassi Racing	Honda	230.068
16	83	(United States) Charlie Kimball	Chip Ganassi Racing	Honda	229.956
17	5	(Canada) James Hinchcliffe	Schmidt Peterson Motorsports	Honda	229.860
18	22	(Colombia) Juan Pablo Montoya W	Team Penske	Chevrolet	229.565
19	3	(Brazil) Hélio Castroneves W	Team Penske	Chevrolet	229.515
20	77	(United Kingdom) Jay Howard	Schmidt Peterson Motorsports	Honda	229.414
21	24	(United States) Sage Karam	Dreyer & Reinbold Racing	Chevrolet	229.380
22	2	(United States) Josef Newgarden	Team Penske	Chevrolet	228.501
23	1	(France) Simon Pagenaud	Team Penske	Chevrolet	228.093
24	14	(Colombia) Carlos Muñoz	A. J. Foyt Enterprises	Chevrolet	227.921
25	88	(Colombia) Gabby Chaves	Harding Racing	Chevrolet	226.921
26	4	(United States) Conor Daly	A. J. Foyt Enterprises	Chevrolet	226.439
27	50	(United Kingdom) Jack Harvey R	Andretti Autosport	Honda	225.742
28	63	(United Kingdom) Pippa Mann	Dale Coyne Racing	Honda	225.008
29	11	(United States) Spencer Pigot	Juncos Racing	Chevrolet	224.052
30	44	(United States) Buddy Lazier W	Lazier Partners Racing	Chevrolet	223.417
31	17	(Colombia) Sebastián Saavedra	Juncos Racing	Chevrolet	221.142
32	40	(United States) Zach Veach R	A. J. Foyt Enterprises	Chevrolet	221.081
	18	(Australia) James Davison	Dale Coyne Racing	Honda	NT / 136 Pts
OFFICIAL REPORT

NOTE: Per INDYCAR Rule 8.4.9, Davison, who was ineligible to participate in qualifying, was classified by the Entrant Points of the #18 car during the current season.

=== Firestone Fast 9 — Sunday, May 21 ===
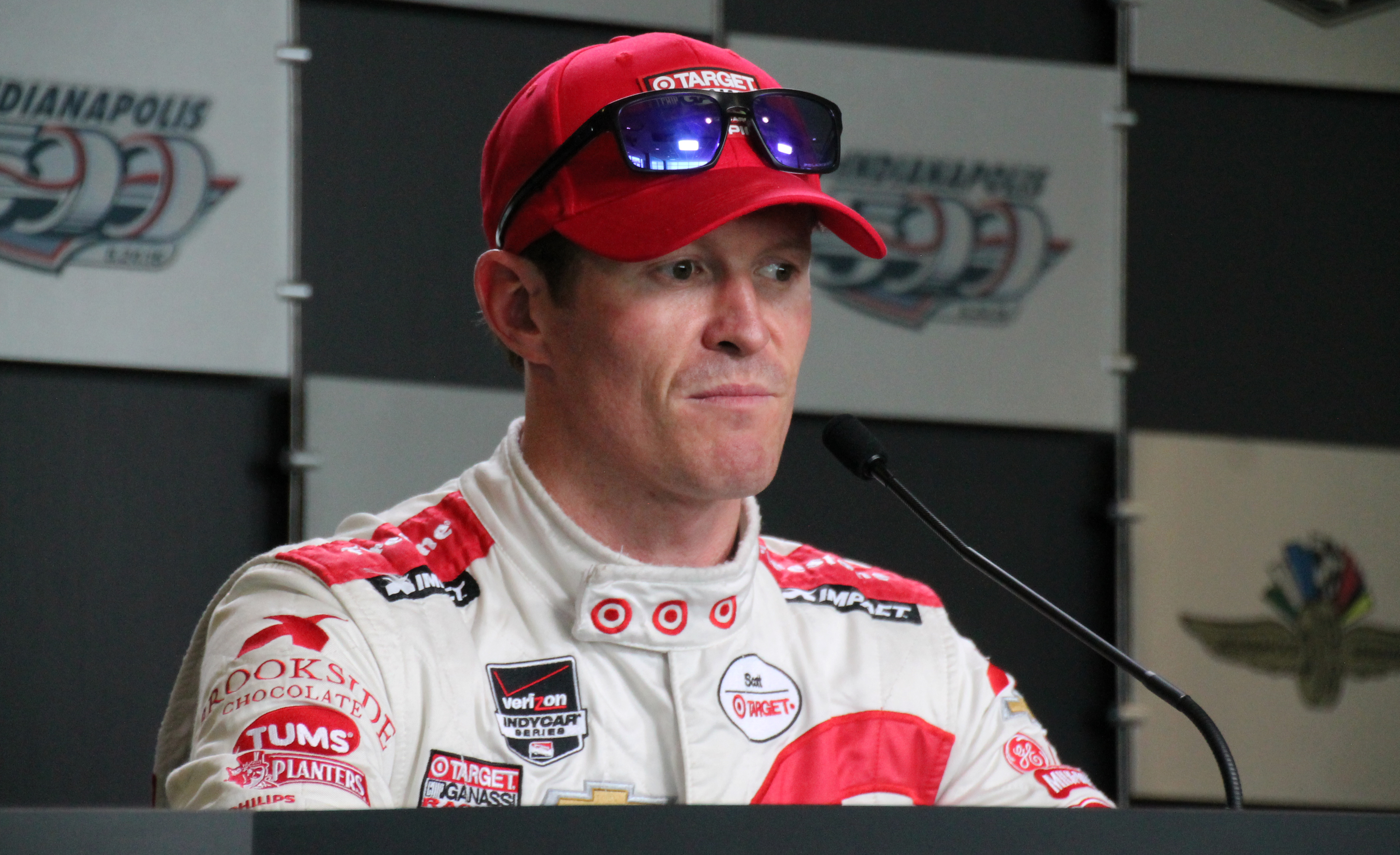
Scott Dixon won the pole position, his third career Indy 500 pole.

Fast Nine qualifying began at 5:00 p.m., with each driver given one shot to reach pole position. Scott Dixon took the pole position with a four-lap average of 232.164 mph; the fastest four-lap average since Arie Luyendyk's track record run in 1996. In addition, his first lap of 232.565 mph was the fastest since Luyendyk's track-record 237.498 mph lap, also in 1996. The run was the third fastest pole speed in 500 history, behind only Scott Brayton's 1996 run and Roberto Guerrero's 1992 run. Joining Dixon on the front row were Ed Carpenter, the highest qualified Chevrolet, and defending winner Alexander Rossi. Fernando Alonso stunned during the session, qualifying fifth in his first ever start on an oval circuit.

Alonso's day did not start out entirely smooth, as Honda officials ordered a last-minute engine change in the car. After examining data from the engine, it was decided to install a new engine, with only an hour and a half until the car was due to be in line for technical inspection. The team scrambled to finish the work, and got the car prepared with only minutes to spare. Takuma Sato had a potential front row starting position until his handling went away on his final two laps, and he subsequently brushed the wall in turn two.

Pos.	No.	Driver	Team	Engine	Speed
Firestone Fast Nine Shootout
1	9	(New Zealand) Scott Dixon	Chip Ganassi Racing	Honda	232.164
2	20	(United States) Ed Carpenter	Ed Carpenter Racing	Chevrolet	231.664
3	98	(United States) Alexander Rossi	Andretti Herta Autosport	Honda	231.487
4	26	(Japan) Takuma Sato	Andretti Autosport	Honda	231.365
5	29	(Spain) Fernando Alonso R	Andretti Autosport	Honda	231.300
6	21	(United States) J. R. Hildebrand	Ed Carpenter Racing	Chevrolet	230.889
7	10	(Brazil) Tony Kanaan	Chip Ganassi Racing	Honda	230.828
8	27	(United States) Marco Andretti	Andretti Autosport with Yarrow	Honda	230.474
9	12	(Australia) Will Power	Team Penske	Chevrolet	230.200

== Post-qualifying practice & Carb Day ==
=== Post-qualifying practice — Monday, May 22 ===
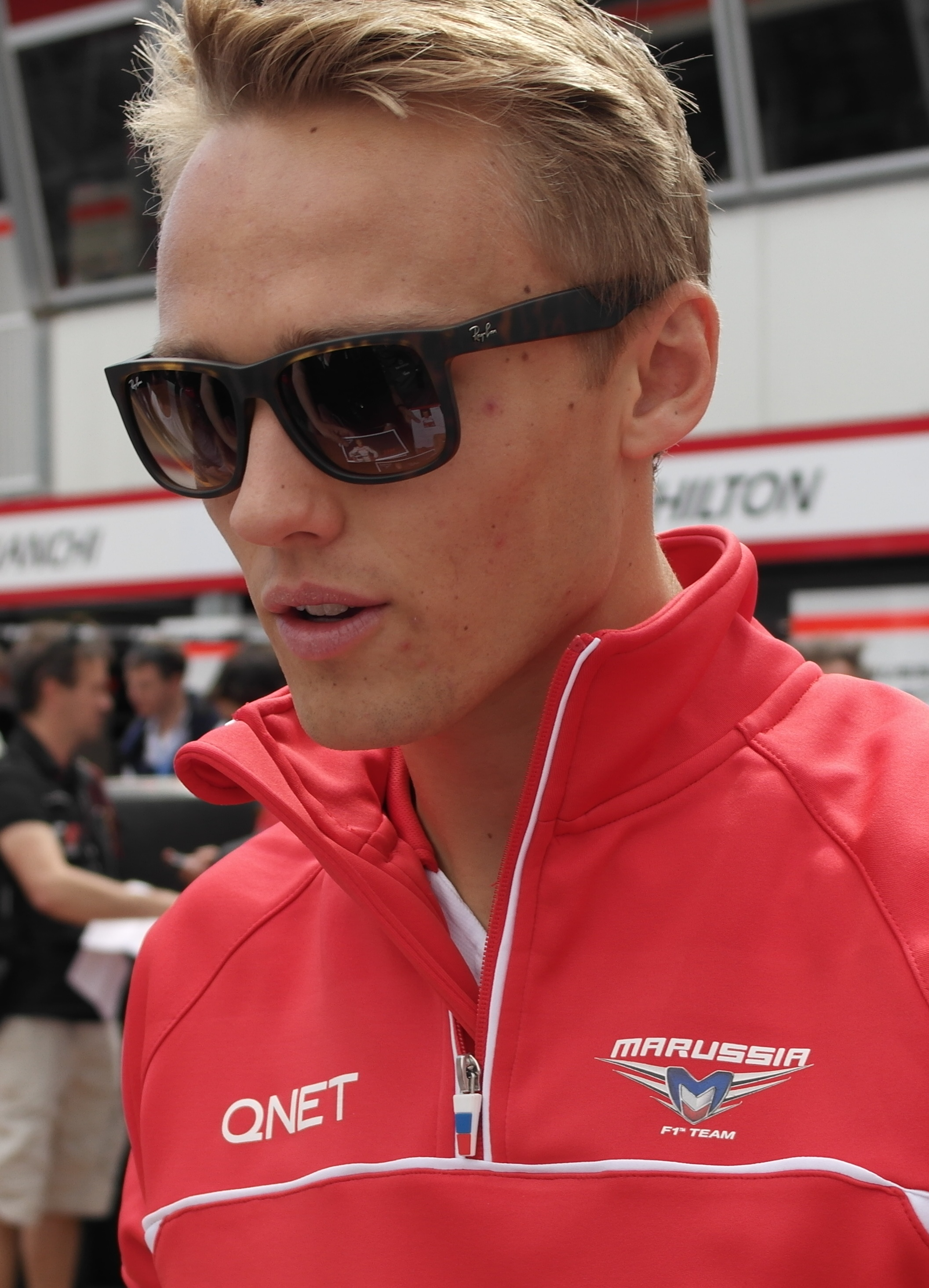
Max Chilton went fastest in post-qualifying practice

- Weather: 77 °F (25 °C), Sunny
- Practice summary: During the first of two post-qualifying practices (the other is Friday), cars returned to their race boost levels, bringing speeds back down. The morning practice session was reserved for Indy Lights cars. The first afternoon session started 30 minutes earlier for James Davison to take the refresher test. The practice session ran from 12:30 p.m. to 4:00 p.m., and the second Indy Lights session began at 4:30 p.m. to conclude the day. The day's lone incident came early in the session, when the engine on Oriol Servià's car failed, bringing a short halt to practice. Max Chilton went fastest on the day with a speed of 228.592 mph. Off the track, news focused on pole position winner Scott Dixon. Late Sunday night, after the conclusion of time trials, Dixon accompanied by former driver Dario Franchitti, were robbed at gunpoint at a Taco Bell drive-thru about a mile away from the track. Neither driver was injured in the altercation.

Top practice speeds
Pos	No.	Driver	Team	Engine	Speed
1	8	(United Kingdom) Max Chilton	Chip Ganassi Racing	Honda	228.592
2	19	(United Arab Emirates) Ed Jones R	Dale Coyne Racing	Honda	228.118
3	9	(New Zealand) Scott Dixon	Chip Ganassi Racing	Honda	227.165
OFFICIAL REPORT

=== Carb Day practice — Friday, May 26 ===
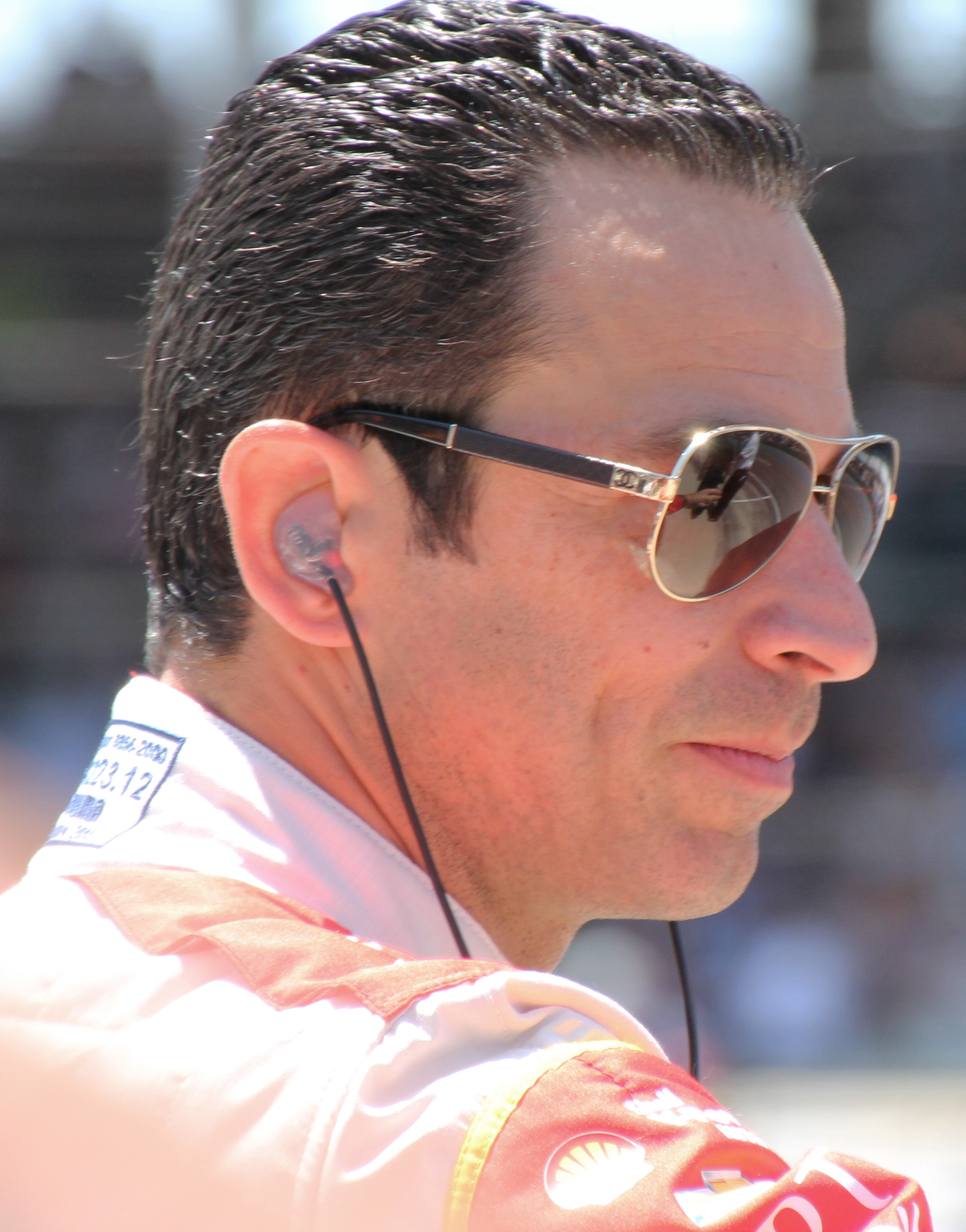
Hélio Castroneves turned the fastest lap during Carb Day practice.

- Weather: 82 °F (28 °C), Mostly cloudy
- Practice summary: The final one-hour practice session was held on Carb Day. Hélio Castroneves led the speed chart, with a total of four Team Penske cars in the top eleven. Polesitter Scott Dixon also ranked in the top five. A total of 960 laps were completed by the field without any wall major contact, however, James Hinchcliffe blew an engine, believed to be Honda's seventh engine failure dating to the IndyCar Grand Prix earlier in the month. Going into the session, Honda teams were limited by the manufacturer to a maximum of 40 laps. Takuma Sato reportedly ran over debris and cut a tire, and later Conor Daly reportedly brushed the wall on the main stretch, which brought two of the several yellow flags during the session.

Top practice speeds
Pos	No.	Driver	Team	Engine	Speed
1	3	(Brazil) Hélio Castroneves	Team Penske	Chevrolet	227.377
2	26	(Japan) Takuma Sato	Andretti Autosport	Honda	226.802
3	10	(Brazil) Tony Kanaan	Chip Ganassi Racing	Honda	226.757
OFFICIAL REPORT

=== Pit Stop Challenge ===
The 40th annual Pit Stop Challenge was scheduled for Friday May 26. For the first time in event history, the finals were a best-of-three format. In addition, the set up was revised such that both cars start the race on asphalt pavement. Previously, one lane was asphalt and one was concrete, putting one lane at a grip disadvantage. Due to an earlier engine failure in James Hinchcliffe's #5 car, Hinchcliffe drove Jay Howard's #77 car for the Pit Stop Challenge.

First Round
3	Team Penske (Hélio Castroneves)	12.211
24	Dreyer & Reinbold (Sage Karam)	14.149
83	Ganassi Racing (Charlie Kimball)	13.722
7	Schmidt Peterson (Mikhail Aleshin)	13.294

Quarterfinals
77	Schmidt Peterson (James Hinchcliffe)	12.112
3	Team Penske (Hélio Castroneves)	13.658
20	Ed Carpenter (Ed Carpenter)	18.654 (+5)
15	Rahal Letterman (Graham Rahal)	14.635
12	Team Penske (Will Power)	12.138
7	Schmidt Peterson (Mikhail Aleshin)	14.108
28	Andretti Autosport (Ryan Hunter-Reay)	16.284
9	Ganassi Racing (Scott Dixon)	12.692

Semifinals
77	Schmidt Peterson (James Hinchcliffe)	12.297
15	Rahal Letterman (Graham Rahal)	14.378
12	Team Penske (Will Power)	11.955
9	Ganassi Racing (Scott Dixon)	12.476

Finals
77	Schmidt Peterson (James Hinchcliffe)	1
12	Team Penske (Will Power)	2

In the second quarterfinals heat, Ed Carpenter was assessed a 5-second penalty due to an unsecured lug nut on the left-front wheel. In the final round, Schmidt Peterson Motorsports (James Hinchcliffe) faced Team Penske (Will Power) in a best two-out-of-three matchup. By virtue of the fastest individual time during the semifinals, Power was awarded lane choice for the first finals heats, and selected the left lane. The teams swapped for the second heat. Power had the best time from the first two finals heats, and was awarded lane choice for the third and final heat. He subsequently selected the left lane again. It was Team Penske's record 17th victory in the event.

Finals
12	Team Penske (Will Power)	11.803	12.300	11.619
77	Schmidt Peterson (James Hinchcliffe)	12.843	12.017	13.223

== Starting grid ==
(R) = Indianapolis 500 rookie; (W) = Former Indianapolis 500 winner

Row	Inside		Middle		Outside	
1	9	(New Zealand) Scott Dixon (W)	20	(United States) Ed Carpenter	98	(United States) Alexander Rossi (W)
2	26	(Japan) Takuma Sato	29	(Spain) Fernando Alonso (R)	21	(United States) J. R. Hildebrand
3	10	(Brazil) Tony Kanaan (W)	27	(United States) Marco Andretti	12	(Australia) Will Power
4	28	(United States) Ryan Hunter-Reay (W)	19	(United Arab Emirates) Ed Jones (R)	16	(Spain) Oriol Servià
5	7	(Russia) Mikhail Aleshin	15	(United States) Graham Rahal	8	(United Kingdom) Max Chilton
6	83	(United States) Charlie Kimball	5	(Canada) James Hinchcliffe	22	(Colombia) Juan Pablo Montoya (W)
7	3	(Brazil) Hélio Castroneves (W)	77	(United Kingdom) Jay Howard	24	(United States) Sage Karam
8	2	(United States) Josef Newgarden	1	(France) Simon Pagenaud	14	(Colombia) Carlos Muñoz
9	88	(Colombia) Gabby Chaves	4	(United States) Conor Daly	50	(United Kingdom) Jack Harvey (R)
10	63	(United Kingdom) Pippa Mann	11	(United States) Spencer Pigot	44	(United States) Buddy Lazier (W)
11	17	(Colombia) Sebastián Saavedra	40	(United States) Zach Veach (R)	18	(Australia) James Davison

=== Withdrew ===
- (France) Sébastien Bourdais (#18) — injured during a qualifying crash; replaced by James Davison

== Race ==
=== First half ===
==== Start ====
Race day saw temperatures in the mid 70 °F (21 °C) range with partly cloudy skies. For the first time since 2014, all 33 cars were able to take the green flag to start the race. At the start, Scott Dixon moved into the lead, while Will Power managed to jump up to second from his ninth place start. However, he soon faded and Tony Kanaan moved into second. On lap 6, Kanaan moved past his teammate Dixon for the lead, while Alexander Rossi held third. Indy 500 rookie Fernando Alonso made a slow start, but quickly began moving his way back up to sixth by lap 19. As pit stops neared, Dixon began to slip down the order, losing second to Rossi and third to Ed Carpenter. The first round of stops came at lap 29, with Kanaan being the first of the leaders to pit. After the sequence, however, Carpenter had moved into the lead, with Rossi second, Alonso third, Kanaan fourth, and Takuma Sato fifth. During the cycle, Jay Howard ran out of fuel, placing him several laps off the pace.

The Andretti Autosport teammates Rossi and Alonso soon dispatched Carpenter, and on lap 37 Alonso moved into the lead. The two dueled for the lead, with Rossi taking back the lead on lap 43, before Alonso returned the favor on lap 48.

==== Lap 53 crash & red flag ====
On the 53rd lap of the race, Jay Howard drifted wide in turn 2 after being passed by Ryan Hunter-Reay, sending him into the wall. Howard's car drifted across the track after the impact and straight into the path of Scott Dixon. Dixon's car was launched off the back of Howard's, sending Dixon into an airborne flip, before crashing down into the inside wall and piercing a hole in the catch fencing. The force of the crash ripped nearly the entire rear assembly from Dixon's machine. Miraculously, neither Dixon nor Howard were injured in the incident. However, extensive repairs were needed for the catch fencing, forcing the race to be red flagged. After 18 minutes of red flag time for the repairs, cars were fired back up and the race resumed under caution with Fernando Alonso still in the lead after subsequent yellow flag pit stops. During the caution, Hélio Castroneves was forced to make repairs to his car after taking minor damage in his attempt to avoid Dixon's car, forcing him back to 22nd.

==== Second quarter ====
When racing finally resumed, Alonso held the lead over his teammates Rossi and Takuma Sato. On lap 61, Rossi returned to the lead, while Sato and Ryan Hunter-Reay both moved past Alonso for position. On lap 65, Sato moved into the lead for the first time of the race. Two laps later came the race's second caution period, as Conor Daly lost control of his car in turn 3 and crashed into the outside wall while trying to make a pass. In the midst of the wreck, Jack Harvey spun attempting to avoid Daly's debris, sending him into the inside wall in the North "short-chute," taking him out of the race as well. During the caution, Castroneves was assessed a drive-through penalty for jumping the previous restart.

The next restart saw Rossi move back around Sato for the lead, while both Hunter-Reay and Tony Kanaan moved around Sato in the following laps to move themselves into second and third respectively. This green flag run was short-lived, though, as caution flew once again on lap 81 as a winglet from Marco Andretti's car broke off and landed on the course on the front straight. The majority of the field elected to pit during the caution, with Hunter-Reay leading Rossi and Alonso out of the pit lane. However, Will Power, Max Chilton, and Hélio Castroneves elected to stay out having made pit stops only six laps earlier during the previous caution, thus placing the trio at the head of the race.

The restart saw Chilton immediately snag the lead away from Power, but by lap 86, those that had pitted during the caution returned to the head of the field. Power began to fall back, while Castroneves and Chilton remained toward the front end of the field. On lap 96, Castroneves moved into the lead of the race after passing Hunter-Reay, while Kanaan moved back into the top five after passing his teammate Chilton.

=== Second half ===
==== Halfway ====
On lap 104, Castroneves, still off sequence from the previous caution, surrendered the lead to make a pit stop, opening up the cycle of green flag stops while handing the lead back to Hunter-Reay. The majority of the field came in around lap 110, with Hunter-Reay resuming the lead with a margin over three seconds to his teammate Rossi. Alonso, Castroneves, and Power rounded out the top five. The gaps were erased on lap 122, when Buddy Lazier lost control of his car in turn 2 and hit the wall, bringing an end to the former winner's day. During the ensuing caution, Sage Karam's race came to an end when a dead battery caused him to grind to a halt on course.

Racing resumed on lap 129, with Hunter-Reay ahead of Alonso and Rossi. One lap later, though, Alonso moved back into the lead of the race. No sooner was the pass complete when caution waved again, this time for debris on the front straight. The brief caution ended on lap 135, with Alonso and Hunter-Reay switching the lead back and forth before Alonso won out on lap 136. However, pre-race concerns about Honda reliability came to fruition that same lap, as Hunter-Reay's engine suddenly began to smoke on the back straight before slowing and coming to a halt just before the pit entrance. Caution once again waved. Most leaders pitted under this period, Alonso leading the field off pit lane. Rossi, however, suffered major fueling issues, dropping him down outside the top 20. Several drivers elected not to pit during the period, including Max Chilton, Charlie Kimball, J. R. Hildebrand, James Davison, and Ed Jones.

The restart saw Kimball grab the lead from Chilton, but caution waved near immediately, as Ed Carpenter did a half spin and punched a hole in the sidepod of Mikhail Aleshin's car, breaking Carpenter's front wing and sending debris across the track in turn 1. Racing resumed on lap 147, with Chilton quickly moving back around Kimball. On lap 149, Graham Rahal's hope of Indy victory was dashed when a deflating tire forced him to pit under green.

==== Fourth quarter ====
With the race drawing to its closing stages, Hélio Castroneves began moving back up the field, and by lap 151 moved into fourth, while James Davison moved into second ahead of him. Further back, Takuma Sato began moving back toward the front, moving to eighth by the end of lap 163. On lap 166, Chilton made what would be his final pit stop, moving James Davison to the lead. Davison, by leading a lap, became the first driver since Alex Tagliani in the 2016 Indianapolis 500 to lead laps after starting last. Caution flew nearly immediately after this, as Charlie Kimball's engine gave up in similar fashion to Hunter-Reay's. At the same time, rookie Zach Veach rolled to a halt on the back straight, his day done as well. Nearly the entire field pitted during the caution, with Ed Jones and Castroneves leading the charge off pit lane. However, having just made a green flag stop, Chilton resumed the lead of the race. The running order was now Chilton, Jones, Castroneves, Davison, and Sato.

Racing resumed with Chilton in control, but Castroneves began to duel with Jones for second. Behind them, Sato moved to fourth after passing Davison. Eventually, Sato managed to pass both Castroneves and Jones, allowing him to pursue Chilton ahead. Behind them, other Honda cars began attempting to move forward, but on lap 179, Fernando Alonso (then running 7th) fell out of the race as his engine failed (a recurring problem for Alonso in Formula 1 over the past two-plus seasons) coming down the front straight; the third Honda failure of the race. Caution once again bunched up the field. Alonso's retirement meant that none of the three McLaren cars scheduled to race that weekend finished their respective races (as both Stoffel Vandoorne and Jenson Button, the latter subbing for Alonso, crashed out of the Monaco Grand Prix in separate incidents).

Racing resumed on lap 184, with Castroneves managing to take third away from Jones. Just behind, chaos erupted in the field when Davison and Oriol Servià made contact in turn 1 triggering a multi-car pile-up that involved Davison, Servia, Will Power, James Hinchcliffe, and Josef Newgarden. Of the five, only Newgarden was able to resume, but only after losing several laps.

==== Finish ====
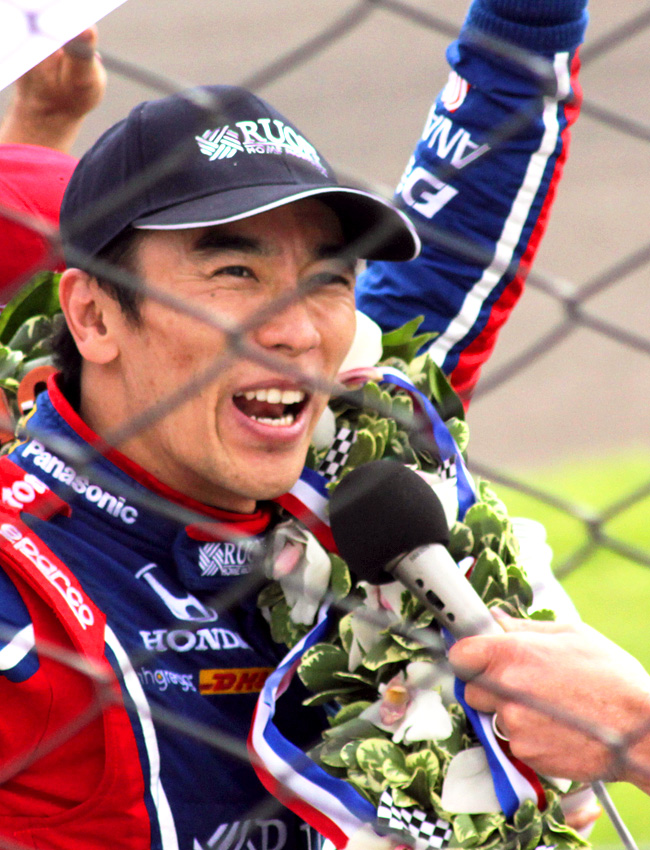
Takuma Sato after winning the Indianapolis 500 race event on May 28, 2017 - Indianapolis Indiana USA

Racing resumed with 11 laps to go with Chilton maintaining his lead over Sato. On lap 192, Castroneves was able to make a pass on Sato for second. One lap later, he managed to move around Chilton, placing the Brazilian in the lead of the race. However, Sato passed Chilton shortly thereafter and, one lap later, moved around Castroneves to take the lead. Castroneves made one last attempt to pass Sato with three laps to go, but was ultimately unable to catch back up to Sato. Takuma Sato took victory by just 0.2011 seconds over Castroneves, while Jones came across the line in third. By taking the win, Sato became both the first driver from Japan and the first driver from Asia to take victory in the 500. Sato also became the first driver to win the Indianapolis 500 and finish on the podium in a United States Grand Prix hosted at Indianapolis, having finished third in 2004. It also marked the first time since 2011 that the winner of the race came from the first three rows. The victory was the third in four years for the Andretti Autosport team.

== Box score ==
Finish	No.	Driver	Team	Engine/Aero Kit	Laps	Status	Pit Stops	Grid	Pts.^{1}
1	26	(Japan) Takuma Sato	Andretti Autosport	Honda	200	155.395 mph	7	4	137
2	3	(Brazil) Hélio Castroneves W	Team Penske	Chevrolet	200	+0.2011	9	19	96
3	19	(United Arab Emirates) Ed Jones R	Dale Coyne Racing	Honda	200	+0.5278	9	11	93
4	8	(United Kingdom) Max Chilton	Chip Ganassi Racing	Honda	200	+1.1365	7	15	86
5	10	(Brazil) Tony Kanaan W	Chip Ganassi Racing	Honda	200	+1.6472	7	7	91
6	22	(Colombia) Juan Pablo Montoya W	Team Penske	Chevrolet	200	+1.7154	7	18	73
7	98	(United States) Alexander Rossi W	Andretti Herta Autosport	Honda	200	+2.4222	7	3	91
8	27	(United States) Marco Andretti	Andretti Autosport with Yorrow	Honda	200	+2.5410	7	8	76
9	88	(Colombia) Gabby Chaves	Harding Racing	Chevrolet	200	+3.8311	8	25	53
10	14	(Colombia) Carlos Muñoz	A. J. Foyt Enterprises	Chevrolet	200	+4.5319	8	24	50
11	20	(United States) Ed Carpenter	Ed Carpenter Racing	Chevrolet	200	+4.6228	10	2	79
12	15	(United States) Graham Rahal	Rahal Letterman Lanigan Racing	Honda	200	+5.0310	9	14	57
13	7	(Russia) Mikhail Aleshin	Schmidt Peterson Motorsports	Honda	200	+5.6993	8	13	55
14	1	(France) Simon Pagenaud	Team Penske	Chevrolet	200	+6.0513	9	23	43
15	17	(Colombia) Sebastián Saavedra	Juncos Racing	Chevrolet	200	+12.6668	11	31	33
16	21	(United States) J. R. Hildebrand	Ed Carpenter Racing	Chevrolet	200	+33.2191	8	6	61
17	63	(United Kingdom) Pippa Mann	Dale Coyne Racing	Honda	199	-1 Lap	13	28	32
18	11	(United States) Spencer Pigot	Juncos Racing	Chevrolet	194	-6 Laps	14	29	29
19	2	(United States) Josef Newgarden	Team Penske	Chevrolet	186	-14 Laps	9	22	34
20	18	(Australia) James Davison	Dale Coyne Racing	Honda	183	Contact	10	33	21
21	16	(Spain) Oriol Servià	Rahal Letterman Lanigan Racing	Honda	183	Contact	7	12	40
22	5	(Canada) James Hinchcliffe	Schmidt Peterson Motorsports	Honda	183	Contact	8	17	33
23	12	(Australia) Will Power	Team Penske	Chevrolet	183	Contact	7	9	41
24	29	(Spain) Fernando Alonso R	McLaren-Honda-Andretti	Honda	179	Engine	7	5	47
25	83	(United States) Charlie Kimball	Chip Ganassi Racing	Honda	166	Engine	6	16	29
26	40	(United States) Zach Veach R	A. J. Foyt Enterprises	Chevrolet	155	Mechanical	12	32	12
27	28	(United States) Ryan Hunter-Reay W	Andretti Autosport	Honda	136	Engine	5	10	35
28	24	(United States) Sage Karam	Dreyer & Reinbold Racing	Chevrolet	125	Battery	5	21	23
29	44	(United States) Buddy Lazier W	Lazier Partners Racing	Chevrolet	118	Contact	5	30	14
30	4	(United States) Conor Daly	A. J. Foyt Enterprises	Chevrolet	65	Contact	3	26	18
31	50	(United Kingdom) Jack Harvey R	Michael Shank Racing with Andretti Autosport	Honda	65	Contact	3	27	17
32	9	(New Zealand) Scott Dixon W	Chip Ganassi Racing	Honda	52	Contact	1	1	53
33	77	(United Kingdom) Jay Howard	Schmidt Peterson Motorsports	Honda	45	Contact	2	20	24
OFFICIAL BOX SCORE

W Former Indianapolis 500 winner

R Indianapolis 500 Rookie

All entrants utilized Firestone tires.

^{1} Points include qualification points from Time Trials, 1 point for leading a lap, and 2 points for most laps led.

=== Race statistics ===
Lap Leaders
Laps	Leader
1–5	Scott Dixon
6–27	Tony Kanaan
28–29	Ed Carpenter
30	J. R. Hildebrand
31	Juan Pablo Montoya
32–34	Ed Carpenter
35–36	Alexander Rossi
37–42	Fernando Alonso
43–47	Alexander Rossi
48–60	Fernando Alonso
61–64	Alexander Rossi
65–75	Takuma Sato
76–78	Alexander Rossi
79–81	Ryan Hunter-Reay
82–83	Will Power
84–86	Max Chilton
87–89	Ryan Hunter-Reay
90–93	Alexander Rossi
94–95	Ryan Hunter-Reay
96–103	Hélio Castroneves
104	Ryan Hunter-Reay
105–109	Alexander Rossi
110–112	Ryan Hunter-Reay
113–114	Graham Rahal
115–129	Ryan Hunter-Reay
130–134	Fernando Alonso
135	Ryan Hunter-Reay
136–138	Fernando Alonso
139–142	Max Chilton
143–147	Charlie Kimball
148–165	Max Chilton
166–167	James Davison
168	J. R. Hildebrand
169–193	Max Chilton
194	Hélio Castroneves
195–200	Takuma Sato

Total laps led
Driver	Laps
Max Chilton	50
Ryan Hunter-Reay	28
Fernando Alonso	27
Alexander Rossi	23
Tony Kanaan	22
Takuma Sato	17
Hélio Castroneves	9
Charlie Kimball	5
Scott Dixon	5
Ed Carpenter	5
Will Power	2
J. R. Hildebrand	2
Graham Rahal	2
James Davison	2
Juan Pablo Montoya	1

Cautions: 10 for 50 laps
Laps	Reason
53–55	Howard, Dixon crash in turn 2 (red flag)
56–59	Restart from red flag
66–74	Daly, Harvey crash in turn 3
81–83	Debris
122–128	Buddy Lazier crash in turn 2
131–133	Debris
137–141	Ryan Hunter-Reay blown engine
143–146	Debris
167–170	Charlie Kimball blown engine
180–182	Fernando Alonso blown engine
184–188	Newgarden, Hinchcliffe, Power, Servià, Davison crash in turn 2

== Championship standings after the race ==
Drivers' Championship standings

	Pos	Driver	Points
3	1	(Brazil) Hélio Castroneves	245
1	2	(France) Simon Pagenaud	234
7	3	(Japan) Takuma Sato	234
2	4	(New Zealand) Scott Dixon	234
4	5	(United States) Alexander Rossi	190

Manufacturer standings

	Pos	Manufacturer	Points
1	1	(Japan) Honda	480
1	2	(United States) Chevrolet	479

- Note: Only the top five positions are included.

== Broadcasting ==
=== Television ===
The race was televised live in the United States on ABC. Allen Bestwick was the lead play-by-play announcer for the race, joined by Scott Goodyear and Eddie Cheever. The race took place just after the highly publicized 2017 ESPN layoffs, of which both Bestwick and Punch were identified as casualties. Both Bestwick and Punch, and presumably the remainder of the contracted on-air crew, was officially terminated a week later after ABC's coverage of the Detroit Grand Prix. However, on February 7, 2018, ESPN communications director Andy Hall announced that the full IndyCar broadcast team, Bestwick and Punch included, would return for the 2018 season.

The broadcast utilized 96 cameras, with 14 cars equipped with three in-car cameras each, and the introduction of Visor Cam, which featured live, first-person camera angles from cameras mounted on the helmets of Graham Rahal and Josef Newgarden. Live in-car camera feeds were available online via WatchESPN. ESPN also introduced a new "Race Strategist" feature, which featured predictive analysis based on various factors that could affect the race. As with all other IndyCar Series events, ESPN International produced a world feed broadcast for international markets.

In the United States, the 2017 Indianapolis 500 was the least-watched edition of the race since the inception of live flag-to-flag coverage, with a 3.6 overnight Nielsen rating (down from 4.1 in 2016). The tape delayed broadcast in Indianapolis (the live broadcast was, as is customary, blacked out by WRTV) saw a 16% increase in viewership over 2015 (the last time the race was blacked out in Indianapolis, since the 2016 edition had its blackout lifted). By contrast, viewership in Spain was significantly high due to Fernando Alonso's debut, with 443,000 viewers and a 3.6% share, higher than the Formula One Monaco Grand Prix that occurred earlier in the day.

Carb Day, the final practice session, along with the Pit Stop Challenge and Freedom 100, were carried on NBCSN. The booth announcers for NBCSN were Kevin Lee, Townsend Bell and Paul Tracy. The pit reporters were Marty Snider, Jon Beekhuis, Katie Hargitt, and Robin Miller. Lee was joined in the booth by Anders Krohn and Ed Jones the Freedom 100 coverage segment.

ABC Television
Booth Announcers	Pit/garage reporters
Host: Lindsay Czarniak; Announcer: Allen Bestwick; Color: Scott Goodyear; Color: Eddie Cheever	Jerry Punch; Jon Beekhuis; Rick DeBruhl
Host: Lindsay Czarniak; Announcer: Allen Bestwick; Color: Scott Goodyear; Color: Eddie Cheever	Marty Smith (pre-race)

=== Radio ===
The race was carried live by the IMS Radio Network, part of the Advance Auto Parts IndyCar Radio Network. Mark Jaynes served as chief announcer for the second year. The crew for 2017 was largely the same from 2016. Once again, all living former chief announcers took part in the broadcast. Paul Page joined as a guest commentator in the booth, and Bob Jenkins appeared during the pre-race in a pre-recorded segment recapping the 25th anniversary of the 1992 race. Jenkins then served on the Speedway Public Address system team. Mike King also appeared during the pre-race coverage, narrating a pre-recorded segment recapping the IndyCar Grand Prix, and Dave Wilson narrated a tribute to John Andretti (a former IMS Radio Network analyst for the Brickyard 400) who was battling colon cancer. During the race, Wilson interviewed vice president Mike Pence, then reported from the track hospital. For the second straight year, Michael Young interviewed the winner in victory lane.

Among the guests in the booth was Governor Eric Holcomb, Mark Reuss (GM), Matt Davis (Advance Auto Parts/Carquest), and James Verrier (BorgWarner). For the first time, the traditional commercial out-cue was recorded by a voice-over announcer instead of the chief announcer or drivers in the field. This was the final 500 in Turn 1 for Jerry Baker as he would depart the crew for and join the public address crew for 2018 when it was decided that Turn 1 would not be used in 2018 but due to a new broadcast booth debuting in 2019 named after Sid Collins, Turn 1's broadcasting location would be reinstated.

According to a study from GfK Custom Research, the broadcast reached 20.5 million listeners, and averaged 8.8 million listeners per quarter hour. It represented a 75% increase in ratings over 2016, and the broadcast was carried on over 350 terrestrial radio affiliates, a 5% increase from 2016.

1070 The Fan broadcast nightly beginning May 8 with Trackside with Curt Cavin and Kevin Lee, followed by Donald Davidson's The Talk of Gasoline Alley.

Indianapolis Motor Speedway Radio Network
Booth Announcers	Turn Reporters	Pit/garage reporters	Color
Chief Announcer: Mark Jaynes; Driver expert: Davey Hamilton; Historian: Donald Davidson	Turn 1: Jerry Baker; Turn 2: Nick Yeoman; Turn 3: Jake Query; Turn 4: Chris Denari	Rob Howden (north pits); Dave Furst (north-center pits); Kevin Lee (south-center pits); Michael Young (south pits)	Commentary: Paul Page; Pre-race: Bob Jenkins; Pre-race: Mike King
Chief Announcer: Mark Jaynes; Driver expert: Davey Hamilton; Historian: Donald Davidson	Turn 1: Jerry Baker; Turn 2: Nick Yeoman; Turn 3: Jake Query; Turn 4: Chris Denari	Dave Wilson (Interviews/Hospital)	Commentary: Paul Page; Pre-race: Bob Jenkins; Pre-race: Mike King

Previous race: 2017 IndyCar Grand Prix	IndyCar Series; 2017 season	Next race: 2017 Chevrolet Detroit Grand Prix
Previous race: 2016 Indianapolis 500	Indianapolis 500	Next race: 2018 Indianapolis 500
