= 2017 IndyCar Grand Prix =

(United States) 2017 IndyCar Grand Prix
Race details
5th round of the 2017 IndyCar Series season
← Previous race	Next race →
- Date: May 13, 2017
- Official name: IndyCar Grand Prix
- Location: Indianapolis Motor Speedway
- Course: Permanent racing facility 2.439 mi / 3.925 km
- Distance: 85 laps 207.315 mi / 333.64 km

Pole position
- Driver: (Australia) Will Power (Team Penske)
- Time: 1:07.7044

Fastest lap
- Driver: (United States) Josef Newgarden (Team Penske)
- Time: 1:09.3888 (on lap 68 of 85)

Podium
- First: (Australia) Will Power (Team Penske)
- Second: (New Zealand) Scott Dixon (Chip Ganassi Racing)
- Third: (United States) Ryan Hunter-Reay (Andretti Autosport)

The 2017 IndyCar Grand Prix, officially known as the 2017 IndyCar Grand Prix presented by Sea-Doo for sponsorship reasons, was the fifth round of the 2017 IndyCar Series season. The race took place over 85 laps on the infield road course at Indianapolis Motor Speedway in Speedway, Indiana. Will Power, driving for Team Penske, won the race.

== Report ==
=== Qualifying ===
Qualifying was held on Friday, May 12. Will Power broke his own track record, setting a time of 1:07.7044 at an average of 129.69 mph (208.44 km/h). It was his 47th career pole, which moved him into fifth place on the all-time list of American open-wheel pole position winners. Alongside him on the front row was his teammate, Hélio Castroneves. Josef Newgarden qualified third, Scott Dixon fourth, and Juan Pablo Montoya, in his first race in an IndyCar since the 2016 season closer, qualified fifth.

=== Race ===
The race was held on Saturday, May 13. The field was able to make its way through the first few corners cleanly, with Will Power holding his lead over Hélio Castroneves, while Scott Dixon moved into third. As the field moved through turn 7 for the first time, Marco Andretti made contact with Tony Kanaan, sending Kanaan into a spin and sending Andretti and Ed Jones into the grass. Kanaan was forced to pit with a punctured tire, while Andretti was assessed a drive-through penalty for avoidable contact. However, the race resumed with no caution. The field continued on, though on lap four, Sébastien Bourdais pulled off course in at turn 1, an engine failure forcing him out of the race. Alexander Rossi moved into the top sixth following Bourdais' misfortune. By lap 17, however, both Ryan Hunter-Reay and Spencer Pigot moved around Rossi, while up front, Power still held the lead.

The first round of pit stops came around lap 20. During this sequence, Castroneves, who had stayed on the red alternate tires, was able to move ahead of Power, who had changed on the black primary tires. Dixon remained third after the stops, while Josef Newgarden, Ryan Hunter-Reay, and Simon Pagenaud rounded out the top six. Pigot, who had been making a charge toward the front, stalled his car during the stops, dropping him back down the order. Shortly after stops, Pagenaud came under fire from James Hinchcliffe, Rossi, and Max Chilton. Hinchcliffe, however, faded from the battle after both Rossi and Chilton made their way by him on the same lap. Pagenaud, however, maintained his sixth.

The second round of stops came just after lap 40. During this sequence, Power and Castroneves switched positions again, thanks to Power being on the alternate tires again. Besides this, the running order remained largely the same, though Chilton managed to move ahead of Rossi. Further down in the order, Graham Rahal, who had started 20th, managed to break into the top 10 with a considerably good run through the field, eventually bringing him up to sixth place. At the same time, Rossi began to drop back due to being on the primary tires, allowing him to fall into the clutches of Juan Pablo Montoya. At the end of this stint, Scott Dixon began to close in on the leaders; the first time he had been able to do so the entire race.

The final round of stops came at roughly lap 65. Power and Castroneves remained the top two, but Castroneves, now forced onto the primary tires, was now considerably slower on track. During the pit sequence, Newgarden was assessed a drive-through penalty for speeding on the pit-lane, removing him from his fourth place. He was then assessed another drive-through penalty for speeding on the pit-lane while serving the first penalty. With this, Hunter-Reay moved up to fourth and Pagenaud to fifth. Up front, Power began to pull away significantly from his teammate Castroneves, while Dixon rapidly gained on the Brazilian. On lap 69, Dixon was by into second place. Castroneves was then quickly dispatched by both Hunter-Reay and Pagenaud, dropping him all the way to fifth. However, this was not enough to stop Power, who was finally able to convert one of his dominant performances into a win on the 2017 season. For Power, it was his 30th IndyCar win, breaking a three-way time between himself, Castroneves, and Rick Mears for 11th all-time for most American Open-Wheel victories. The win also moved him into the top five in the championship after a disastrous start to the season. Simon Pagenaud maintained the points lead, holding a 10-point advantage over Scott Dixon.

For the first time in the race's history, the Grand Prix of Indianapolis saw no caution periods.

== Results ==
Key	Meaning
R	Rookie
W	Past winner

=== Qualifying ===
Pos	No.	Name	Grp.	Round 1	Round 2	Firestone Fast 6
1	12	(Australia) Will Power W	2	1:08.1894	1:07.9823	1:07.7044
2	3	(Brazil) Hélio Castroneves	2	1:08.2619	1:08.1428	1:08.1169
3	2	(United States) Josef Newgarden	1	1:08.1223	1:08.1526	1:08.1622
4	9	(New Zealand) Scott Dixon	2	1:08.3653	1:08.3560	1:08.2454
5	22	(Colombia) Juan Pablo Montoya	2	1:08.4167	1:08.0158	1:08.2478
6	18	(France) Sébastien Bourdais	2	1:08.3497	1:08.3921	1:08.3973
7	1	(France) Simon Pagenaud W	1	1:08.3435	1:08.4461	
8	28	(United States) Ryan Hunter-Reay	2	1:08.4490	1:08.5735	
9	98	(United States) Alexander Rossi	1	1:08.6134	1:08.5824	
10	5	(Canada) James Hinchcliffe	1	1:08.9403	1:08.8668	
11	27	(United States) Marco Andretti	1	1:08.6686	1:08.9151	
12	10	(Brazil) Tony Kanaan	1	1:08.9358	1:08.9853	
13	19	(United Arab Emirates) Ed Jones R	1	1:09.0025		
14	8	(United Kingdom) Max Chilton	2	1:08.6675		
15	4	(United States) Conor Daly	1	1:09.0557		
16	20	(United States) Spencer Pigot	2	1:08.9484		
17	7	(Russia) Mikhail Aleshin	1	1:09.1777		
18	14	(Colombia) Carlos Muñoz	2	1:08.9937		
19	83	(United States) Charlie Kimball	1	1:09.1796		
20	15	(United States) Graham Rahal	2	1:09.0985		
21	21	(United States) J. R. Hildebrand	1	1:09.6123		
22	26	(Japan) Takuma Sato	2	1:09.3134		
OFFICIAL BOX SCORE

Source for individual rounds:

=== Race ===
Pos	No.	Driver	Team	Engine	Laps	Status	Pit Stops	Grid	Laps Led	Pts.^{1}
1	12	(Australia) Will Power W	Team Penske	Chevrolet	85	1:42:57.6108	3	1	61	54
2	9	(New Zealand) Scott Dixon	Chip Ganassi Racing	Honda	85	+5.2830	3	4		40
3	28	(United States) Ryan Hunter-Reay	Andretti Autosport	Honda	85	+12.0296	3	8		35
4	1	(France) Simon Pagenaud W	Team Penske	Chevrolet	85	+17.0668	3	7		32
5	3	(Brazil) Hélio Castroneves	Team Penske	Chevrolet	85	+20.6072	3	2	24	31
6	15	(United States) Graham Rahal	Rahal Letterman Lanigan Racing	Honda	85	+25.1039	3	20		28
7	8	(United Kingdom) Max Chilton	Chip Ganassi Racing	Honda	85	+25.7054	3	14		26
8	98	(United States) Alexander Rossi	Andretti Herta Autosport	Honda	85	+29.3214	3	9		24
9	20	(United States) Spencer Pigot	Ed Carpenter Racing	Chevrolet	85	+36.5878	3	16		22
10	22	(Colombia) Juan Pablo Montoya	Team Penske	Chevrolet	85	+41.8238	3	5		20
11	2	(United States) Josef Newgarden	Team Penske	Chevrolet	85	+48.3846	5	3		19
12	26	(Japan) Takuma Sato	Andretti Autosport	Honda	85	+56.2212	3	22		18
13	5	(Canada) James Hinchcliffe	Schmidt Peterson Motorsports	Honda	85	+1:02.6805	3	10		17
14	21	(United States) J. R. Hildebrand	Ed Carpenter Racing	Chevrolet	84	+1 Lap	3	21		16
15	14	(Colombia) Carlos Muñoz	A. J. Foyt Enterprises	Chevrolet	84	+1 Lap	3	18		15
16	27	(United States) Marco Andretti	Andretti Autosport	Honda	84	+1 Lap	4	11		14
17	4	(United States) Conor Daly	A. J. Foyt Enterprises	Chevrolet	84	+1 Lap	3	15		13
18	7	(Russia) Mikhail Aleshin	Schmidt Peterson Motorsports	Honda	84	+1 Lap	4	17		12
19	19	(United Arab Emirates) Ed Jones R	Dale Coyne Racing	Honda	84	+1 Lap	4	13		11
20	10	(Brazil) Tony Kanaan	Chip Ganassi Racing	Honda	83	+2 Laps	5	12		10
21	83	(United States) Charlie Kimball	Chip Ganassi Racing	Honda	32	Lost power	2	19		9
22	18	(France) Sébastien Bourdais	Dale Coyne Racing	Honda	3	Engine	0	6		8
OFFICIAL BOX SCORE

=== Notes ===
All cars ran Dallara chassis with aerokits supplied by their respective engine manufacturer.

This was Sébastien Bourdais last race until the August 26 race at Gateway due to suffering injuries in Indy 500 time trials

^{1} Points include 1 point for leading at least 1 lap during a race, an additional 2 points for leading the most race laps, and 1 point for Pole Position.

Source for time gaps:

== Championship standings after the race ==
Drivers' Championship standings

	Pos	Driver	Points
	1	(France) Simon Pagenaud	191
	2	(New Zealand) Scott Dixon	181
	3	(United States) Josef Newgarden	152
2	4	(Brazil) Hélio Castroneves	149
2	5	(Australia) Will Power	145

Manufacturer standings

Pos	Manufacturer	Points
1	(United States) Chevrolet	410
2	(Japan) Honda	388

- Note: Only the top five positions are included.

Previous race: 2017 Desert Diamond West Valley Phoenix Grand Prix	IndyCar Series; 2017 season	Next race: 2017 Indianapolis 500
Previous race: 2016 Grand Prix of Indianapolis	Grand Prix of Indianapolis	Next race: 2018 IndyCar Grand Prix
