= 2017 Honda Indy Grand Prix of Alabama =

(United States) 2017 Alabama
Race details
3rd round of the 2017 IndyCar Series season
← Previous race	Next race →
- Date: April 23, 2017
- Official name: Honda Indy Grand Prix of Alabama
- Location: Barber Motorsports Park
- Course: Permanent racing facility 2.38 mi / 3.83 km
- Distance: 90 laps 214.2 mi / 344.7 km

Pole position
- Driver: (Australia) Will Power (Team Penske)
- Time: 1:06.9614

Fastest lap
- Driver: (Australia) Will Power (Team Penske)
- Time: 1:08.2763 (on lap 86 of 90)

Podium
- First: (United States) Josef Newgarden (Team Penske)
- Second: (New Zealand) Scott Dixon (Chip Ganassi Racing)
- Third: (France) Simon Pagenaud (Team Penske)

The 2017 Honda Indy Grand Prix of Alabama was the third round of the 2017 IndyCar Series season. The race was held on April 23, 2017 at Barber Motorsports Park in Birmingham, Alabama. Australian Will Power qualified on pole for the event, while American Josef Newgarden took victory.

== Report ==
=== Qualifying ===
Qualifying was held on Saturday, April 22. Team Penske dominated the session, taking the top three spots with Will Power starting from pole position with a time of 1:06.9614 at an average speed of 127.95 mph (205.92 km/h). Behind him were his teammates Hélio Castroneves and Simon Pagenaud. Scott Dixon, Ryan Hunter-Reay, and James Hinchcliffe rounded out the top six.

=== Race ===
The race was held on Sunday, April 23 with a threat of rain through the duration of the event. Prior to the green flag, Marco Andretti suffered issues starting the car, resulting in him falling three laps behind before even turning a lap. At the start of the race, Will Power and Hélio Castroneves maintained their positions, while Scott Dixon was able to pass Simon Pagenaud for third place. Behind them, Ryan Hunter-Reay and James Hinchcliffe made contact coming out of turn three, casing a piece of Hunter-Reay's front wing to break off and hit the front wing of Ed Jones, breaking his front wing as well. During the incident, Josef Newgarden was able to slip by both to move up to fifth place. The debris from the incident resulted in the first caution period of the race. During this period, Hunter-Reay and Jones both pitted for repairs.

Racing resumed on lap 6, with the running order up front remaining unchanged. However, Newgarden began to gain ground and, only a few laps after the restart, was able to pass Pagenaud for fourth. Hinchcliffe managed to move into fifth in the same move after Pagenaud lost momentum from being forced out wide by Newgarden. The first round of green flag pit stops followed, during which Newgarden was able to jump up to second thanks to quick pit work from his team and the slowing pace of Castroneves and Dixon, who had gone the farthest on their first stint. Dixon was also able to get around Castroneves during the sequence, allowing him to maintain his third position. Further back in the field, Alexander Rossi, despite a poor qualifying result, had managed to move into the top ten and was continuing to improve.

The second round of green flag pit stops came just after lap 40. Just before their stops, Dixon was able to get around Newgarden for second place. However, a slow pit stop from his team meant that Dixon emerged behind Newgarden once again following the pit sequence. Behind them, Castroneves fell back even further, as both Pagenaud and Hinchcliffe were able to make faster pit stops than the Brazilian veteran. After the stops, Newgarden began to close in on Power, reducing the gap to roughly 1 second before Power responded a pulled the gap back out to nearly 2 seconds by lap 60.

On lap 62, just before the opening for the final round of stops, the second caution of the race came when Spencer Pigot, who had been running eighth, spun coming out of turn 5 and stalled just off course. Nearly the entire field pitted during the caution, with Power emerging from pit lane first, while Dixon managed to leapfrog Newgarden. However, the race lead belonged now to Charlie Kimball, who elected to stay out during the caution. With Kimball's final pit stop still coming, however, Power was essentially still the leader of the race.

Racing resumed with 22 laps to go. Kimball and Power maintained their positions, but Newgarden was able to get back around Dixon in less than one lap. On lap 75, Kimball pitted, handing the lead back to Power. However, Power's car had developed a puncture in one of the rear tires, forcing Power to pit and dropping him well down the running order. Newgarden inherited the lead and, despite pressure from Dixon behind, took his fourth career victory. Pagenaud came across the line third, Castroneves fourth, and Rossi a respectable fifth. Power was only able to recover to 14th; a disappointing end to a day he dominated.

For Newgarden, the victory was his first driving for Team Penske and his first since Iowa of the previous season. It was also his second win at Barber in three years. For Dixon, it was his seventh podium finish at the track without a victory. Sébastien Bourdais managed an eighth place finish on the day, allowing him to maintain his points lead.

For the third consecutive year, no cars retired from the event.

== Results ==
Key	Meaning
R	Rookie
W	Past winner

=== Qualifying ===
Pos	No.	Name	Grp.	Round 1	Round 2	Firestone Fast 6
1	12	(Australia) Will Power W	2	1:06.9311	1:07.3392	1:06.9614
2	3	(Brazil) Hélio Castroneves W	2	1:07.4333	1:07.2877	1:07.1429
3	1	(France) Simon Pagenaud W	2	1:07.4536	1:07.3214	1:07.3817
4	9	(New Zealand) Scott Dixon	2	1:07.1954	1:07.5380	1:07.5817
5	28	(United States) Ryan Hunter-Reay W	2	1:07.6055	1:07.5207	1:07.6851
6	5	(Canada) James Hinchcliffe	1	1:07.3014	1:07.5459	1:07.8710
7	2	(United States) Josef Newgarden W	1	1:07.4628	1:07.5941	
8	7	(Russia) Mikhail Aleshin	1	1:07.4983	1:07.9467	
9	8	(United Kingdom) Max Chilton	1	1:07.5374	1:07.9788	
10	10	(Brazil) Tony Kanaan	1	1:07.3070	1:08.0305	
11	19	(United Arab Emirates) Ed Jones R	1	1:07.5360	1:08.2034	
12	18	(France) Sébastien Bourdais	2	1:07.6287	1:08.2726	
13	27	(United States) Marco Andretti	1	1:07.5405		
14	26	(Japan) Takuma Sato	2	1:07.6928		
15	83	(United States) Charlie Kimball	1	1:07.7033		
16	14	(Colombia) Carlos Muñoz	2	1:07.7007		
17	20	(United States) Spencer Pigot	1	1:07.9211		
18	98	(United States) Alexander Rossi	2	1:07.7483		
19	21	(United States) Zach Veach R	1	1:08.4681		
20	4	(United States) Conor Daly	2	1:08.0104		
21	15	(United States) Graham Rahal	2	1:08.0499		
OFFICIAL BOX SCORE

Source for individual rounds:

=== Race ===
Pos	No.	Driver	Team	Engine	Laps	Time/Retired	Pit Stops	Grid	Laps Led	Pts.^{1}
1	2	(United States) Josef Newgarden W	Team Penske	Chevrolet	90	1:54:08.7076	3	7	14	51
2	9	(New Zealand) Scott Dixon	Chip Ganassi Racing	Honda	90	+1.0495	3	4	3	41
3	1	(France) Simon Pagenaud W	Team Penske	Chevrolet	90	+2.5706	3	3		35
4	3	(Brazil) Hélio Castroneves W	Team Penske	Chevrolet	90	+11.1592	3	2	2	33
5	98	(United States) Alexander Rossi	Andretti Herta Autosport	Honda	90	+12.0469	3	18		30
6	5	(Canada) James Hinchcliffe	Schmidt Peterson Motorsports	Honda	90	+12.5905	3	6		28
7	10	(Brazil) Tony Kanaan	Chip Ganassi Racing	Honda	90	+15.4105	3	10		26
8	18	(France) Sébastien Bourdais	Dale Coyne Racing	Honda	90	+16.0651	3	12		24
9	26	(Japan) Takuma Sato	Andretti Autosport	Honda	90	+20.1764	3	14		22
10	7	(Russia) Mikhail Aleshin	Schmidt Peterson Motorsports	Honda	90	+20.7064	5	8		20
11	28	(United States) Ryan Hunter-Reay W	Andretti Autosport	Honda	90	+22.2061	4	5		19
12	8	(United Kingdom) Max Chilton	Chip Ganassi Racing	Honda	90	+22.9713	3	9		18
13	15	(United States) Graham Rahal	Rahal Letterman Lanigan Racing	Honda	90	+24.3457	4	21		17
14	12	(Australia) Will Power W	Team Penske	Chevrolet	90	+26.3177	4	1	60	20
15	83	(United States) Charlie Kimball	Chip Ganassi Racing	Honda	90	+35.4868	4	15	11	16
16	19	(United Arab Emirates) Ed Jones R	Dale Coyne Racing	Honda	90	+39.5644	6	11		14
17	14	(Colombia) Carlos Muñoz	A. J. Foyt Enterprises	Chevrolet	90	+50.3679	6	16		13
18	4	(United States) Conor Daly	A. J. Foyt Enterprises	Chevrolet	90	+51.2029	3	20		12
19	21	(United States) Zach Veach R	Ed Carpenter Racing	Chevrolet	90	+56.2545	6	19		11
20	20	(United States) Spencer Pigot	Ed Carpenter Racing	Chevrolet	89	+1 Lap	3	17		10
21	27	(United States) Marco Andretti	Andretti Autosport	Honda	87	+3 Laps	4	13		9
OFFICIAL BOX SCORE

Notes: ^{1} Points include 1 point for leading at least 1 lap during a race, an additional 2 points for leading the most race laps, and 1 point for Pole Position.

Source for time gaps:

== Championship standings after the race ==
Drivers' Championship standings

	Pos	Driver	Points
	1	(France) Sébastien Bourdais	117
2	2	(New Zealand) Scott Dixon	111
2	3	(United States) Josef Newgarden	110
1	4	(France) Simon Pagenaud	106
3	5	(Canada) James Hinchcliffe	102

Manufacturer standings

Pos	Manufacturer	Points
1	(Japan) Honda	255
2	(United States) Chevrolet	226

- Note: Only the top five positions are included.

Previous race: 2017 Toyota Grand Prix of Long Beach	IndyCar Series; 2017 season	Next race: 2017 Desert Diamond West Valley Phoenix Grand Prix
Previous race: 2016 Honda Indy Grand Prix of Alabama	Honda Indy Grand Prix of Alabama	Next race: 2018 Honda Indy Grand Prix of Alabama
