= 2017 Desert Diamond West Valley Phoenix Grand Prix =

(United States) 2017 Phoenix
Race details
4th round of the 2017 IndyCar Series season
← Previous race	Next race →
- Phoenix International Raceway (2011-2018)
- Date: April 29, 2017
- Official name: Desert Diamond West Valley Phoenix Grand Prix
- Location: Phoenix International Raceway
- Course: Permanent racing facility 1.022 mi / 1.645 km
- Distance: 250 laps 255.5 mi / 411.25 km

Pole position
- Driver: (Brazil) Hélio Castroneves (Team Penske)
- Time: 18.8837 + 18.8701 = 37.7538

Fastest lap
- Driver: (Australia) Will Power (Team Penske)
- Time: 19.7446 (on lap 208 of 250)

Podium
- First: (France) Simon Pagenaud (Team Penske)
- Second: (Australia) Will Power (Team Penske)
- Third: (United States) J. R. Hildebrand (Ed Carpenter Racing)

The 2017 Desert Diamond West Valley Phoenix Grand Prix was the fourth round of the 2017 IndyCar Series season and the first oval race of the season. It took place on April 29, 2017, at Phoenix International Raceway in Avondale, Arizona. The race was won by Simon Pagenaud for Team Penske, his first ever victory on an oval.

== Report ==
=== Qualifying ===
Qualifying was held on Friday, April 28. Hélio Castroneves took pole position, breaking the track record that he had set the previous lap with a time of 37.7538 (194.905 mph). His teammate Will Power qualified second. J. R. Hildebrand qualified third; the only driver outside of Team Penske in the top five. Tony Kanaan in sixth place was the fastest Honda driver.

=== Race ===
The race was held on Saturday, April 29. The start saw Hélio Castroneves pull into the lead, while Josef Newgarden was able to move into second after passing both Will Power and J. R. Hildebrand. Behind them, however, the start was chaotic, as Mikhail Aleshin spun in the middle of turn one, triggering a multi-car incident that took out championship leader Sébastien Bourdais, Max Chilton, Marco Andretti, and Graham Rahal. All five were out of the race. Ryan Hunter-Reay suffered a punctured tire in the incident and dropped to 15th following his pit stop.

After a lengthy clean-up, racing resumed on lap 22, where Simon Pagenaud managed to move in front of Hildebrand for fourth place. For several laps, the order remained unchanged. On lap 70, however, Pagenaud was able to catch up to his teammate Power and move himself into third place. Pit stops began shortly after, where Power was able to leapfrog all three of his teammates and take the lead of the race, with Castroneves, Pagenaud, and Newgarden behind. James Hinchcliffe rounded out the top five after the stops. During the cycle, Conor Daly lost numerous laps after suffering a gearbox failure while on pit lane on lap 78.

The order remained largely unchanged for the following stint, though Newgarden, struggling with a broken front wing, lost his fourth position to a hard-charging Hildebrand. At roughly lap 120, the second cycle of pit stops came, during which Alexander Rossi made contact with the wall and was forced to retire from the race, though there was no caution for this incident. Shortly after, however, Rossi's teammate Takuma Sato made contact with the turn four wall and came to a stop on the frontstretch, bringing out the caution. Due to where the pit stop cycle was at the time, Pagenaud now held a sizable advantage on the field, allowing him to pit under yellow without losing any track position.

The restart came on lap 149, where Pagenaud was able to pull out a healthy lead due to several lapped cars being between him and Power. Further back, Newgarden was able to march back up into the top five quickly after finally being afforded the chance to change his front wing. Little change in the order occurred as the field cycled through their final pit cycle from about lap 190 through lap 210. Pagenaud's lead now stood at over 5.5 seconds on lap 215.

Shortly after pit stops, Newgarden's day went awry once again, as he and Ryan Hunter-Reay made contact, breaking Newgarden's front wing again and breaking Hunter-Reay's suspension, taking him out of the race. For the second time in three races, all Andretti Autosport cars were out of the race. Newgarden changed front wings again, dropping him to 10th. The biggest beneficiary of the incident, however, was Hildebrand, who was able to pass both Newgarden and Castroneves, who had slowed up to avoid the incident, boosting him to third place.

Up front, it was smooth sailing for Pagenaud, who came across the finish line over nine seconds ahead of his teammate Power. Hildebrand came across the line third, securing his first podium finish in six years. Castroneves finished fourth while Scott Dixon, who ran a quiet race, finished fifth, the first car one lap down. For Pagenaud, the victory was his 10th career victory and his first ever on an oval. For Team Penske, it was the team's 450th win in motorsports and the 100th IndyCar win for the team on an oval. The victory also allowed Pagenaud to take the lead in the points. Attendance was 18,500

== Results ==
Key	Meaning
R	Rookie
W	Past winner

=== Qualifying ===
Pos	No.	Name	Lap 1 Time	Lap 2 Time	Total Time	Avg. Speed (mph)
1	3	(Brazil) Hélio Castroneves W	18.8837	18.8701	37.7538	194.905
2	12	(Australia) Will Power	19.0188	18.9078	37.9266	194.017
3	21	(United States) J. R. Hildebrand	18.9757	18.9714	37.9471	193.912
4	2	(United States) Josef Newgarden	19.0256	18.9677	37.9933	193.676
5	1	(France) Simon Pagenaud	19.0242	19.0207	38.0449	193.414
6	10	(Brazil) Tony Kanaan W	19.1216	19.0962	38.2178	192.539
7	7	(Russia) Mikhail Aleshin	19.1620	19.0979	38.2599	192.327
8	9	(New Zealand) Scott Dixon W	19.1750	19.1446	38.3151	192.050
9	27	(United States) Marco Andretti	19.2693	19.1785	38.4478	191.387
10	18	(France) Sébastien Bourdais	19.2417	19.2137	38.4554	191.349
11	5	(Canada) James Hinchcliffe	19.2536	19.2330	38.4866	191.194
12	28	(United States) Ryan Hunter-Reay	19.2688	19.2975	38.5663	190.799
13	8	(United Kingdom) Max Chilton	19.3579	19.2146	38.5725	190.768
14	83	(United States) Charlie Kimball	19.3029	19.3107	38.6136	190.565
15	98	(United States) Alexander Rossi	19.3721	19.2740	38.6461	190.405
16	19	(United Arab Emirates) Ed Jones R	19.3822	19.3404	38.7226	190.029
17	15	(United States) Graham Rahal	19.4304	19.3417	38.7721	189.786
18	26	(Japan) Takuma Sato	19.3940	19.3796	38.7736	189.779
19	14	(Colombia) Carlos Muñoz	19.4935	19.3780	38.8715	189.301
20	4	(United States) Conor Daly	19.5375	19.4916	39.0291	188.536
21	20	(United States) Ed Carpenter	19.7062	19.7787	39.4849	186.360
OFFICIAL BOX SCORE

Source for individual Laps:

=== Race ===
Pos	No.	Driver	Team	Engine	Laps	Time/Retired	Pit Stops	Grid	Laps Led	Pts.^{1}
1	1	(France) Simon Pagenaud	Team Penske	Chevrolet	250	1:46:24.9473	3	5	116	53
2	12	(Australia) Will Power	Team Penske	Chevrolet	250	+9.1028	3	2	59	41
3	21	(United States) J. R. Hildebrand	Ed Carpenter Racing	Chevrolet	250	+9.3417	3	3		35
4	3	(Brazil) Hélio Castroneves W	Team Penske	Chevrolet	250	+16.5864	3	1	73	34
5	9	(New Zealand) Scott Dixon W	Chip Ganassi Racing	Honda	249	+1 Lap	3	8		30
6	10	(Brazil) Tony Kanaan W	Chip Ganassi Racing	Honda	249	+1 Lap	3	6		28
7	20	(United States) Ed Carpenter	Ed Carpenter Racing	Chevrolet	248	+2 Laps	5	21		26
8	83	(United States) Charlie Kimball	Chip Ganassi Racing	Honda	248	+2 Laps	3	14		24
9	2	(United States) Josef Newgarden	Team Penske	Chevrolet	248	+2 Laps	6	4	2	23
10	14	(Colombia) Carlos Muñoz	A. J. Foyt Enterprises	Chevrolet	247	+3 Laps	4	19		20
11	19	(United Arab Emirates) Ed Jones R	Dale Coyne Racing	Honda	247	+3 Laps	4	16		19
12	5	(Canada) James Hinchcliffe	Schmidt Peterson Motorsports	Honda	246	+4 Laps	4	11		18
13	28	(United States) Ryan Hunter-Reay	Andretti Autosport	Honda	220	Mechanical	5	12		17
14	4	(United States) Conor Daly	A. J. Foyt Enterprises	Chevrolet	180	+70 Laps	7	20		16
15	98	(United States) Alexander Rossi	Andretti Herta Autorsport	Honda	141	Contact	4	15		15
16	26	(Japan) Takuma Sato	Andretti Autosport	Honda	135	Contact	2	18		14
17	7	(Russia) Mikhail Aleshin	Schmidt Peterson Motorsports	Honda	0	Contact	0	7		13
18	27	(United States) Marco Andretti	Andretti Autosport	Honda	0	Contact	0	9		12
19	18	(France) Sébastien Bourdais	Dale Coyne Racing	Honda	0	Contact	0	10		11
20	8	(United Kingdom) Max Chilton	Chip Ganassi Racing	Honda	0	Contact	0	13		10
21	15	(United States) Graham Rahal	Rahal Letterman Lanigan Racing	Honda	0	Contact	0	17		9
OFFICIAL BOX SCORE

Notes: ^{1} Points include 1 point for leading at least 1 lap during a race, an additional 2 points for leading the most race laps, and 1 point for Pole Position.

Source for time gaps:

== Championship standings after the race ==
Drivers' Championship standings

	Pos	Driver	Points
3	1	(France) Simon Pagenaud	159
	2	(New Zealand) Scott Dixon	141
	3	(United States) Josef Newgarden	133
3	4	(France) Sébastien Bourdais	128
	5	(Canada) James Hinchcliffe	120

Manufacturer standings

	Pos	Manufacturer	Points
1	1	(United States) Chevrolet	322
1	2	(Japan) Honda	313

- Note: Only the top five positions are included.

Previous race: 2017 Honda Indy Grand Prix of Alabama	IndyCar Series; 2017 season	Next race: 2017 IndyCar Grand Prix
Previous race: 2016 Desert Diamond West Valley Phoenix Grand Prix	Desert Diamond West Valley Phoenix Grand Prix	Next race: 2018 Desert Diamond West Valley Phoenix Grand Prix
