= 1400 AM =

AM radio frequency

The following radio stations broadcast on AM frequency 1400 kHz. 1400 kHz is defined as a Class C (local) frequency in the coterminous United States and such stations on this frequency are limited to 1,000 watts. U.S. stations outside the coterminous United States (Alaska, Hawaii, Puerto Rico, & the U.S. Virgin Islands) on this frequency are defined as Class B (regional) stations.

== Argentina ==
- LRG202 in Neuquen, Neuquen
- LRH207 in Charata, Chaco
- Radio Punto in Buenos Aires

== Brazil ==
- Rádio Rio de Janeiro in Rio de Janeiro

== Canada ==
Call sign	City of license	Daytime power (kW)	Nighttime power (kW)	Transmitter coordinates
CBG	Gander, Newfoundland and Labrador	4	4	48.9658°N 54.655°W
CHNL-1	Clearwater, British Columbia	1	1	51.6572°N 120.083°W
CKOR	Princeton, British Columbia	1	1	49.4472°N 120.513°W

== Mexico ==
- XECSAO-AM in Ciudad Serdán, Puebla
- XESH-AM in Sabinas Hidalgo, Nuevo León
- XEUBJ-AM in Oaxaca City, Oaxaca

== United States ==
Call sign	City of license	Facility ID	Class	Daytime power (kW)	Nighttime power (kW)	Critical hours power (kW)	Unlimited power (kW)	Transmitter coordinates
KADR	Elkader, Iowa	16782	C				1	42.849167°N 91.411944°W
KAOK	Lake Charles, Louisiana	67330	C	1	1			30.236111°N 93.167222°W
KART	Jerome, Idaho	33445	C				1	42.730833°N 114.538056°W
KAYS	Hays, Kansas	18074	C				1	38.891389°N 99.3675°W
KAZZ	Parowan, Utah	129732	C	1	1			37.806111°N 112.944444°W
KBAM	Longview, Washington	38379	C	1	1			46.149167°N 122.974722°W
KBCH	Lincoln City, Oregon	50004	C				1	44.990833°N 123.979167°W
KBJM	Lemmon, South Dakota	40994	C				1	45.918056°N 102.198611°W
KBLJ	La Junta, Colorado	7047	C				1	37.987222°N 103.566944°W
KBRB	Ainsworth, Nebraska	33679	C				1	42.554444°N 99.831111°W
KBYG	Big Spring, Texas	17590	C				1	32.222778°N 101.476389°W
KCHS	Truth or Consequences, New Mexico	47137	C				1	33.140556°N 107.231944°W
KCOG	Centerville, Iowa	33736	C	0.42	0.84			40.746389°N 92.905°W
KCOW	Alliance, Nebraska	18089	C	1	1			42.106111°N 102.888056°W
KCYK	Yuma, Arizona	39616	C	1	1			32.651667°N 114.650278°W
KEBE	Jacksonville, Texas	70741	C				1	31.969722°N 95.264444°W
KELD	El Dorado, Arkansas	48945	C				1	33.237222°N 92.665°W
KEYE	Perryton, Texas	52328	C				1	36.388889°N 100.826944°W
KEYL	Long Prairie, Minnesota	53300	C				1	45.9625°N 94.869167°W
KFJL	Central Point, Oregon	160256	C	1	1			42.348611°N 122.914167°W
KFRU	Columbia, Missouri	12396	C	1	1			38.9625°N 92.303889°W
KFTM	Fort Morgan, Colorado	38636	C				1	40.258611°N 103.851944°W
KGMY	Springfield, Missouri	63886	C				1	37.196111°N 93.3225°W
KGVL	Greenville, Texas	21598	C				1	33.167222°N 96.098611°W
KGWU	Uvalde, Texas	69620	C	1	1			29.187778°N 99.776667°W
KHCB	Galveston, Texas	27703	C	1	1			29.426389°N 95.133333°W
KIHH	Eureka, California	160910	C	0.79	0.79			40.802778°N 124.137778°W
KIUN	Pecos, Texas	52064	C				1	31.435833°N 103.503889°W
KIXR	Provo, Utah	53103	C				1	40.258056°N 111.706667°W
KJDY	John Day, Oregon	5917	C				1	44.421389°N 118.9525°W
KJFF	Festus, Missouri	35532	C				1	38.232222°N 90.397222°W
KJYE	Delta, Colorado	6606	C				1	38.760556°N 108.091111°W
KKJL	San Luis Obispo, California	58897	C				1	35.264167°N 120.665556°W
KKTK	Texarkana, Texas	4439	C	1	1			33.442778°N 94.055556°W
KKTL	Casper, Wyoming	86873	C				1	42.856111°N 106.361389°W
KLCK	Goldendale, Washington	35060	C	1	1			45.823611°N 120.837778°W
KLIN	Lincoln, Nebraska	35064	C	1	1			40.848333°N 96.674722°W
KMHL	Marshall, Minnesota	32999	C				1	44.449722°N 95.761944°W
KMNV	St. Paul, Minnesota	99	C				1	44.957778°N 93.206389°W
KNND	Cottage Grove, Oregon	66972	C	0.95	0.95			43.761944°N 123.078333°W
KNNR	Sparks, Nevada	89558	C	1	1			39.569444°N 119.750833°W
KNRO	Redding, California	51639	C				1	40.558611°N 122.33°W
KODI	Cody, Wyoming	74351	C	1	1			44.512778°N 109.055556°W
KQDJ	Jamestown, North Dakota	68626	C				1	46.893611°N 98.688889°W
KREF	Norman, Oklahoma	22192	C				1	35.217778°N 97.410278°W
KREW	Plainview, Texas	54683	C				1	34.215278°N 101.723611°W
KRPL	Moscow, Idaho	35561	C				1	46.746389°N 117.018333°W
KRSC	Othello, Washington	25350	C	1	1			46.825556°N 119.186944°W
KRUN	Ballinger, Texas	10025	C				1	31.725278°N 99.961667°W
KRVZ	Springerville, Arizona	17390	C	1	1			34.138056°N 109.270833°W
KRZR	Visalia, California	2096	C				1	36.353889°N 119.283889°W
KSHP	North Las Vegas, Nevada	55502	C	1	1			36.210833°N 115.163056°W
KSIM	Sikeston, Missouri	35605	C				1	36.87°N 89.608889°W
KSPT	Sandpoint, Idaho	5989	C				1	48.304444°N 116.542222°W
KSUN	Phoenix, Arizona	21430	C				1	33.389722°N 111.997778°W
KTEM	Temple, Texas	63200	C	0.95	0.95			31.066944°N 97.399167°W
KTMC	McAlester, Oklahoma	67593	C	1	1			34.949444°N 95.766944°W
KTNM	Tucumcari, New Mexico	54166	C				1	35.170833°N 103.706944°W
KTUC	Tucson, Arizona	35684	C				1	32.276944°N 110.980556°W
KUNO	Corpus Christi, Texas	33777	C	1	1			27.76°N 97.437222°W
KUNX	Santa Paula, California	70562	C				1	34.33°N 119.091944°W
KVFD	Fort Dodge, Iowa	60862	C				0.85	42.478889°N 94.202778°W
KVOE	Emporia, Kansas	69777	C				1	38.386111°N 96.176667°W
KVRP	Stamford, Texas	57475	C				1	32.931111°N 99.783333°W
KVSF	Santa Fe, New Mexico	59101	C				1	35.682222°N 105.9725°W
KVTO	Berkeley, California	28681	C				1	37.849444°N 122.295556°W
KWON	Bartlesville, Oklahoma	36004	C				1	36.764722°N 95.959722°W
KWUF	Pagosa Springs, Colorado	51287	C				1	37.256667°N 107.018333°W
KWYN	Wynne, Arkansas	18183	C	1	1			35.256111°N 90.796667°W
KXGF	Great Falls, Montana	63878	C	0.68	0.68			47.465556°N 111.322778°W
KXGN	Glendive, Montana	24285	C				1	47.094444°N 104.713889°W
WAJL	South Boston, Virginia	160359	C	1	1			36.709722°N 78.874444°W
WAMC	Albany, New York	4683	C	1	1			42.689167°N 73.793611°W
WANI	Opelika, Alabama	63796	C	1	1			32.657222°N 85.424167°W
WATW	Ashland, Wisconsin	4078	C				0.78	46.573611°N 90.865556°W
WAVQ	Jacksonville, North Carolina	161860	C	1	1			34.748889°N 77.414167°W
WAWO	Alma, Georgia	63861	C				1	31.530556°N 82.4625°W
WBAT	Marion, Indiana	41841	C				1	40.561111°N 85.691667°W
WBBD	Wheeling, West Virginia	73192	C				1	40.096944°N 80.701667°W
WBFN	Battle Creek, Michigan	37462	C	1	1			42.304167°N 85.192222°W
WBIP	Booneville, Mississippi	71213	C				1	34.639167°N 88.575833°W
WBIZ	Eau Claire, Wisconsin	2107	C	0.97	0.97			44.815556°N 91.518611°W
WCCY	Houghton, Michigan	65672	C				1	47.135°N 88.564722°W
WCOS	Columbia, South Carolina	4673	C				1	34.005°N 81.011944°W
WCYN	Cynthiana, Kentucky	71307	C	0.5	1			38.405556°N 84.292222°W
WDNY	Dansville, New York	15369	C	0.88	1			42.538611°N 77.6825°W
WDTK	Detroit, Michigan	68641	C				1	42.406111°N 83.112222°W
WDUZ	Green Bay, Wisconsin	25119	C				1	44.493333°N 87.986944°W
WDWS	Champaign, Illinois	14961	C				1	40.084444°N 88.248056°W
WEOA	Evansville, Indiana	61042	C	1	1			37.938056°N 87.527778°W
WEST	Easton, Pennsylvania	36996	C				1	40.673056°N 75.208333°W
WFLL	Fort Lauderdale, Florida	67812	C	1	1			26.173611°N 80.157778°W
WFOR	Hattiesburg, Mississippi	54612	C	1	1			31.335°N 89.326389°W
WFPR	Hammond, Louisiana	679	C				1	30.508611°N 90.505°W
WFTG	London, Kentucky	20412	C	0.69	0.69			37.141667°N 84.079167°W
WGAP	Maryville, Tennessee	72087	C				1	35.761389°N 83.9825°W
WGIL	Galesburg, Illinois	23039	C	0.74	0.74			40.942778°N 90.344167°W
WGTN	Georgetown, South Carolina	23899	C	1	1			33.404167°N 79.326667°W
WHGB	Harrisburg, Pennsylvania	32944	C				1	40.249444°N 76.8675°W
WHHV	Hillsville, Virginia	39626	C				1	36.75°N 80.722222°W
WHLJ	Moultrie, Georgia	129158	C	1	1			31.165278°N 83.765556°W
WHMP	Northampton, Massachusetts	46962	C				1	42.326667°N 72.657778°W
WHTB	Fall River, Massachusetts	60701	C				1	41.689722°N 71.145278°W
WHUB	Cookeville, Tennessee	70514	C	0.74	0.74			36.163333°N 85.524722°W
WHZP	Veazie, Maine	128805	C	1	0.81			44.847222°N 68.679167°W
WICK	Scranton, Pennsylvania	36489	C				1	41.418056°N 75.661944°W
WIDA	Carolina, Puerto Rico	54870	B				1	18.396944°N 65.935°W
WIEL	Elizabethtown, Kentucky	19355	C	1	1			37.744167°N 85.813611°W
WILI	Willimantic, Connecticut	66180	C				1	41.715°N 72.189722°W
WINC	Winchester, Virginia	41809	C	1	1			39.188056°N 78.151944°W
WJET	Erie, Pennsylvania	33769	C				1	42.124444°N 80.065°W
WJLD	Fairfield, Alabama	56299	C				1	33.476667°N 86.883611°W
WJMX	Darlington, South Carolina	3119	C	1	1			34.316111°N 79.888056°W
WJQS	Jackson, Mississippi	50409	C				1	32.32°N 90.190278°W
WJZN	Augusta, Maine	52604	C	1	1	1		44.291944°N 69.773611°W (daytime and nighttime); 44.291667°N 69.774167°W (critical hours)
WKAV	Charlottesville, Virginia	10651	C				1	38.030278°N 78.489444°W
WKBI	St. Marys, Pennsylvania	65603	C				1	41.415556°N 78.565556°W
WKEW	Greensboro, North Carolina	73156	C	0.76	0.76			36.066667°N 79.796944°W
WKNW	Sault Sainte Marie, Michigan	978	C	1	0.95			46.488333°N 84.329167°W
WKPT	Kingsport, Tennessee	27495	C				1	36.543611°N 82.5225°W
WLJN	Elmwood Township, Michigan	24603	C				0.64	44.776667°N 85.661944°W
WLLH	Lawrence, Massachusetts	24971	C	1	1			42.7075°N 71.164167°W
WLTA	Alpharetta, Georgia	42660	C				1	34.063611°N 84.276111°W
WLTN	Littleton, New Hampshire	53635	C				1	44.313056°N 71.768889°W
WMAN	Mansfield, Ohio	67609	C				0.92	40.770278°N 82.543333°W
WMFA	Raeford, North Carolina	24697	C				1	34.978611°N 79.208889°W
WMXF	Waynesville, North Carolina	40979	C				1	35.503889°N 82.973611°W
WNZE	Clarksville, Tennessee	12495	C	0.38	0.38			36.515833°N 87.349167°W
WOND	Pleasantville, New Jersey	61102	C				1	39.39°N 74.5125°W
WPCE	Portsmouth, Virginia	72813	C	1	1			36.802778°N 76.282778°W
WQXO	Munising, Michigan	41826	C				1	46.408333°N 86.639444°W
WQYQ	St. Joseph, Michigan	74004	C	0.88	0.88			42.084167°N 86.443889°W
WRAK	Williamsport, Pennsylvania	15325	C				1	41.239444°N 77.040833°W
WRDB	Reedsburg, Wisconsin	59233	C	1	0.64			43.541667°N 90.034722°W
WRJN	Racine, Wisconsin	41437	C				1	42.710556°N 87.830278°W
WRZX	Newnan, Georgia	48739	C				1	33.364722°N 84.811667°W
WSAM	Saginaw, Michigan	65930	C				1	43.416667°N 83.918056°W
WSDO	Sanford, Florida	29340	C				1	28.801111°N 81.251667°W
WSEG	Savannah, Georgia	25548	C	0.65	0.65			32.074722°N 81.071389°W
WSIC	Statesville, North Carolina	503	C	1	1			35.8025°N 80.891667°W
WSLB	Ogdensburg, New York	66663	C				1	44.705833°N 75.465278°W
WSMY	Weldon, North Carolina	39675	C				1	36.411944°N 77.618333°W
WSPG	Spartanburg, South Carolina	3026	C				1	34.973889°N 81.926944°W
WSTC	Stamford, Connecticut	10660	C	0.78	0.78			41.046944°N 73.526667°W
WTSL	Hanover, New Hampshire	12083	C				1	43.684167°N 72.296111°W
WUXL	Macon, Georgia	54034	C	1	1			32.851944°N 83.653056°W
WVAE	Biddeford, Maine	73088	C	1	1			43.481667°N 70.486389°W
WVGC	Elberton, Georgia	54562	C	1	1			34.113889°N 82.881111°W
WVRC	Spencer, West Virginia	62294	C				1	38.806389°N 81.361111°W
WWIN	Baltimore, Maryland	54709	C	0.5	0.5			39.301667°N 76.569167°W
WWWS	Buffalo, New York	56104	C	0.745	0.745			42.926111°N 78.841111°W
WYUP	Loretto, Pennsylvania	63425	C				1	40.503333°N 78.636111°W
WZAZ	Jacksonville, Florida	68761	C	1	1			30.328611°N 81.695°W
WZHR	Zephyrhills, Florida	74550	C				1	28.281667°N 82.208333°W
WZNG	Shelbyville, Tennessee	37023	C				1	35.473889°N 86.445833°W

== Uruguay ==
- CX140 Radio Zorrilla in Tacuarembó, Tacuarembó.
