= KEYE =

KEYE or Keye may refer to:

- KEYE-TV, a television station (channel 34, virtual 42) licensed to Austin, Texas, United States
- KEYE (AM), a radio station (1400 AM) licensed to Perryton, Texas
- KEYE-FM, a radio station (93.7 FM) licensed to Perryton, Texas
- Eagle Creek Airpark (ICAO code:KEYE), an airport in Indianapolis, Indiana, United States
- Keye, an alternate name for Kévé, Togo
