= WIDA =

WIDA may refer to:

- WIDA (AM), a radio station (1400 AM) licensed to Carolina, Puerto Rico
- WIDA-FM, a radio station (90.5 FM) licensed to Carolina, Puerto Rico
- WIDA Consortium, a partnership of U.S. state departments of education that develops learning standards for English Language Learners
