= Sage Karam =

American racing driver (born 1995)

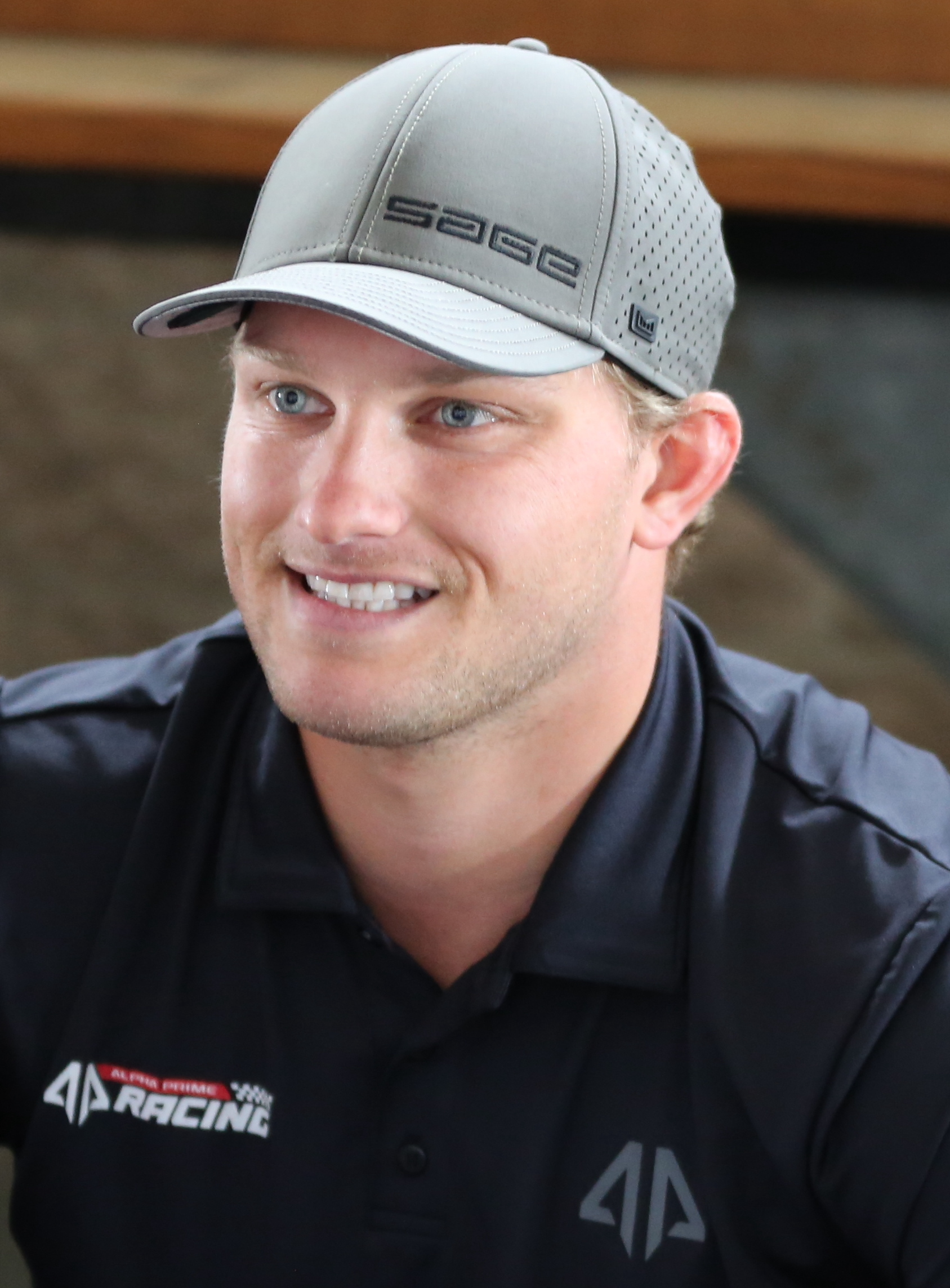
- Karam at Sonoma Raceway in 2023
- Nationality: (United States) American
- Born: Sage Rennie Karam; March 5, 1995 (age 31) Nazareth, Pennsylvania, U.S.
- Categorisation: FIA Gold

IndyCar Series career
- 25 races run over 9 years
- 2022 position: 34th
- Best finish: 20th (2015)
- First race: 2014 Indianapolis 500 (Indianapolis)
- Last race: 2022 Indianapolis 500 (Indianapolis)
Wins	Podiums	Poles
0	1	0

NASCAR O'Reilly Auto Parts Series career
- 36 races run over 6 years
- 2026 position: 66th
- Best finish: 35th (2023)
- First race: 2021 Pennzoil 150 (Indianapolis G.P.)
- Last race: 2026 Focused Health 250 (Austin)
Wins	Top tens	Poles
0	2	0

NASCAR FedEx Freight Truck Series career
- 2 races run over 2 years
- 2024 position: 89th
- Best finish: 89th (2024)
- First race: 2021 United Rentals 200 (Martinsville)
- Last race: 2024 CRC Brakleen 175 (Pocono)
Wins	Top tens	Poles
0	0	0

ARCA Menards Series West career
- 1 race run over 1 year
- Best finish: 65th (2026)
- First race: 2026 General Tire 150 (Sonoma)
Wins	Top tens	Poles
0	0	0
- Statistics up to date as of November 7, 2026.

Previous series
- 2010 2011–2012 2013 2019: U.S. F2000 National Championship; Star Mazda Championship; Indy Lights; Americas Rallycross Championship

Championship titles
- 2010 2013: U.S. F2000 National Championship; Firestone Indy Lights Champion

Sage Rennie Karam (born March 5, 1995) is an American professional auto racing driver. He last competed part-time in the NASCAR O'Reilly Auto Parts Series, driving the No. 55 Toyota GR Supra for Joey Gase Motorsports with Scott Osteen, and part-time in the ARCA Menards Series West, driving the No. 72 Chevrolet for Strike Mamba Racing. He previously competed full-time and part-time in the IndyCar Series. He is the 2013 champion in what is now the Indy NXT Series.

== Racing career ==
=== Early career ===
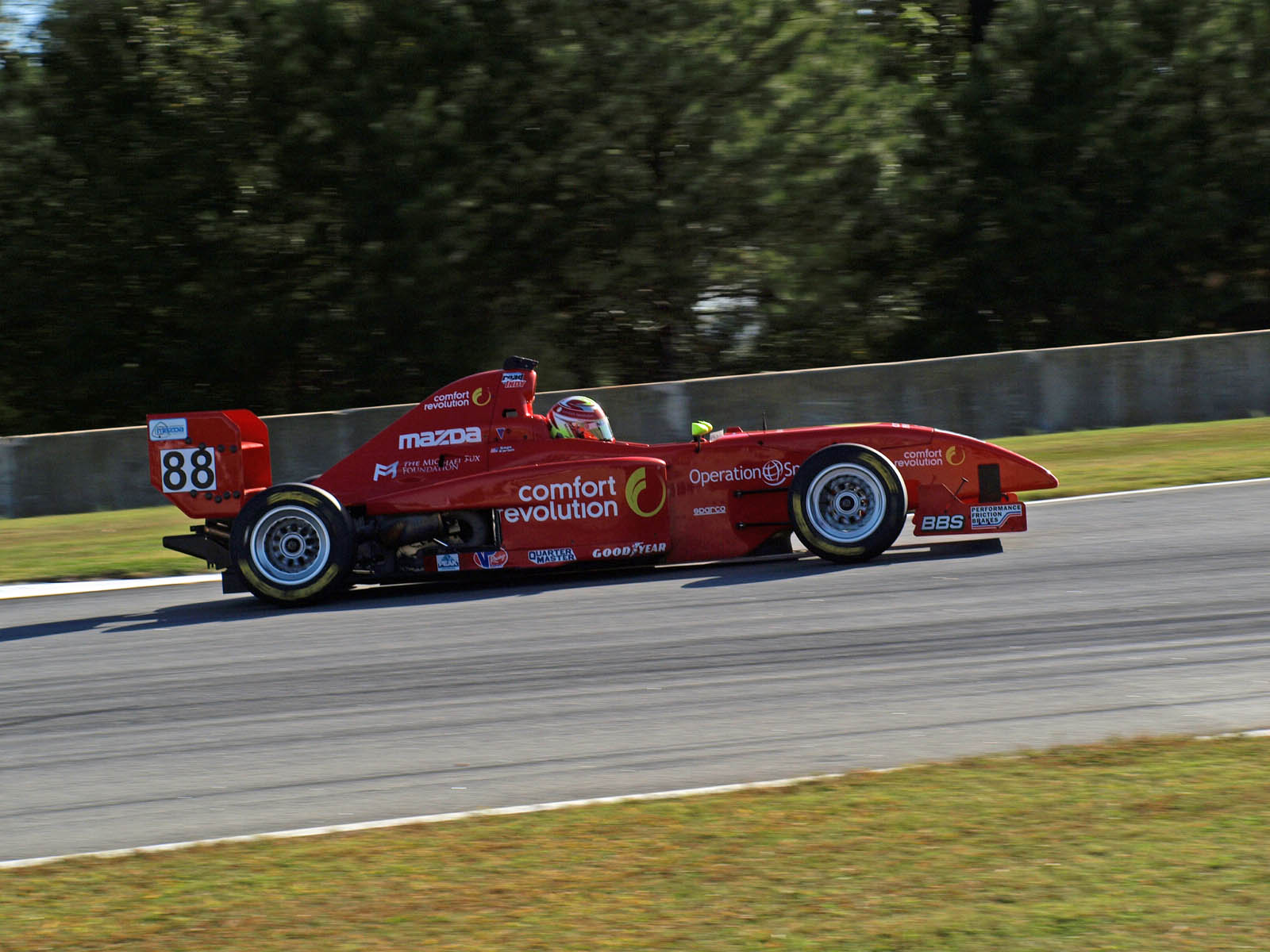
Karam's 2012 Star Mazda Championship car

Karam was born in and grew up in Nazareth, Pennsylvania. He raced go-karts at Oakland Valley Race Park in Cuddebackville, New York in his youth.

After karting, Karam competed in the 2010 season of the USF2000 Championship for Andretti Autosport. Karam won nine of twelve races and the pole in all but one race and dominated the championship. For winning the championship, as a part of the Road to Indy program and the Mazdaspeed development ladder, Karam won a prize package valued at US$350,000 that allowed him to compete in the Star Mazda Championship in 2011, again with Andretti Autosport. Karam won back-to-back oval races at the Milwaukee Mile and Iowa Speedway and finished fifth in points, winning rookie of the year honors. He returned to the team and series in 2012 and improved to third in points with three race wins.

=== Indy Lights ===
In 2013, Karam moved up the Road to Indy ladder to the Firestone Indy Lights series with Schmidt Peterson Motorsports. Karam won the Indy Lights title that year, becoming the eighth rookie to win the series championship.

=== Sports cars ===
Karam was signed by Chip Ganassi Racing to compete in a number of endurance sportscar races in the United SportsCar Championship in 2014. He ran in the 24 Hours of Daytona, driving the No. 01 car alongside Scott Pruett, Memo Rojas and Jamie McMurray, and the 12 Hours of Sebring in the No. 02, next to IndyCar drivers Scott Dixon and Tony Kanaan.

The Daytona 24 Hours was a short race for Karam, as they suffered engine troubles and dropped out early.

Taking over in hour four, Karam made his 12 Hours of Sebring debut a memorable one by taking the No. 02 car from third place to the lead in his opening lap then extending his lead through the end of his driving stint. Karam took the wheel for his second stint with the car in fourth place and proceeded to drive to the lead again before handing off to Dixon, who was then knocked off course of a back-marker, leaving them in sixth place at race end.

Back in the 01 car for Watkins Glen, teamed with Scott Pruett and Memo Rojas, things went awry quickly for the trio as first Rojas was sent hard into the wall by a slower GT car. They returned to the race several laps down, only for Pruett to suffer similar consequences when knocked into the wall by a sports prototype.

With Rojas sidelined due to nagging back injuries, Karam started for his final appearance of the season at the Brickyard Grand Prix, teamed with Pruett in the 01 car. Starting sixth, he skillfully dodged a major melee as several cars came together at the start. The 01 team remained among the leaders and lead eleven laps before collecting a second place, podium finish.

During 2016, Karam worked as a test driver of 3GT Racing's Lexus RC F GT3. He competed at the 2017 IMSA WeatherTech SportsCar Championship for the factory-supported team, where his best class finish was fifth at Mosport Park.

=== IndyCar ===
Ganassi secured Karam a seat in the 2014 Indianapolis 500 with Dreyer & Reinbold Racing, which had not run an IndyCar race since the previous "500". Karam qualified 31st but drove an outstanding race to finish ninth, the second-highest-finishing rookie.

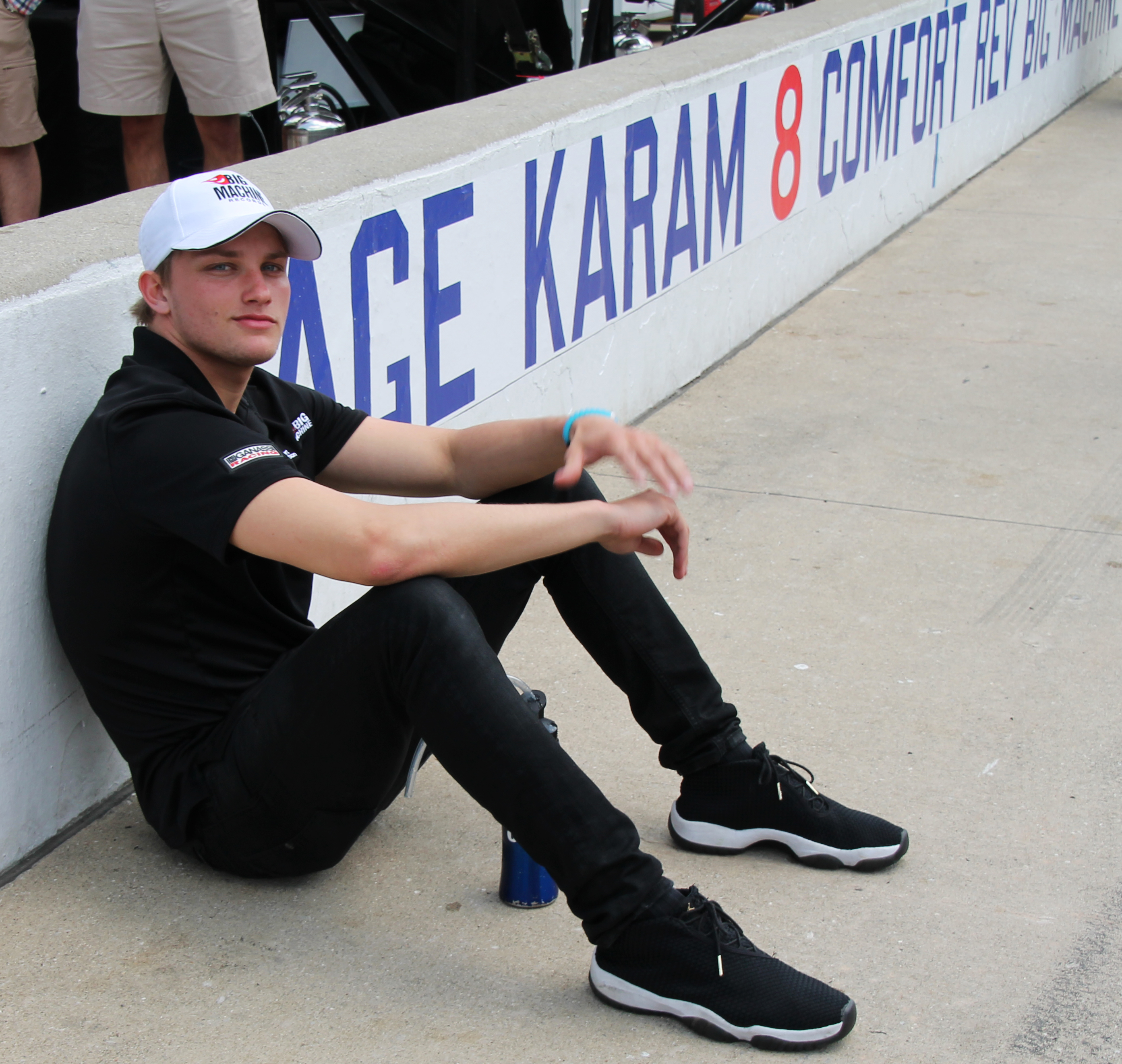
Karam sitting in front of his pit stall before the 2015 Indianapolis 500 Carb Day

During the 2015 IndyCar Series season, Karam split the driving duties for the Chip Ganassi Racing No. 8 Dallara with Sebastián Saavedra, who ran four races on a limited budget. While his season started slowly, by finishing in the lower third of the field in his first three road/street courses events of the season, he proved to be a quick study on the ovals. At Indianapolis, he was at the top of the speed charts on the opening day of practice and consistently remained among the top cars in successive sessions. After qualifying 23rd, with a conservative setup, he was on top of the speed charts again during the post-qualifying practice and seventh quickest during Carb Day. Considered to be a dark-horse favorite on race day, it was all for naught as he was forced to settle with a 32nd-place finish in the 2015 Indianapolis 500, after contact with Takuma Sato. At the next race, in Detroit, during a heavy downpour, Karam was on pole with ninety seconds left in qualifying when IndyCar canceled the session due to track conditions. Following his third place qualifying effort and leading five laps on his way to a fifth place finish at Fontana, Karam captured his season-best finish at the 2015 Iowa Corn 300 at Iowa Speedway in July, by finishing third.

==== 2015 ABC Supply 500 crash at Pocono ====
In his homecoming at Pocono Raceway in Long Pond, Pennsylvania for the 2015 ABC Supply 500 on August 23, Karam was leading with 21 laps remaining when he lost control exiting the first turn, eliminating his Chip Ganassi No. 8 Dallara as it spun and crashed hard into the wall. Debris strewn from Karam's disintegrating car made contact with fellow competitor Justin Wilson's helmet, sending him into the infield wall where the safety team extracted him unconscious and unresponsive, necessitating an emergency medevac to Lehigh Valley Hospital–Cedar Crest in Allentown where Wilson lay comatose, in critical condition. Wilson succumbed to his injuries on August 24, 2015.

With Saavedra back in the car for the 2015 season finale at Sonoma, Karam finished the 2015 IndyCar season twentieth in points, bested by rival Gabby Chaves for 2015 rookie of the year honors. Replaced for the 2016 season, Karam's seat in the Chip Ganassi stable piloting the number 8 Dallara was secured by Max Chilton.

On a one-race agreement for 2016, Dreyer & Reinbold signed Karam for the Indianapolis 500, initially with Havoline and Gas Monkey Garage as sponsors. Steadily improving from his 23rd qualifying slot on grid, into the top-ten, Karam crashed on lap 94, going into Townsend Bell in turn one.

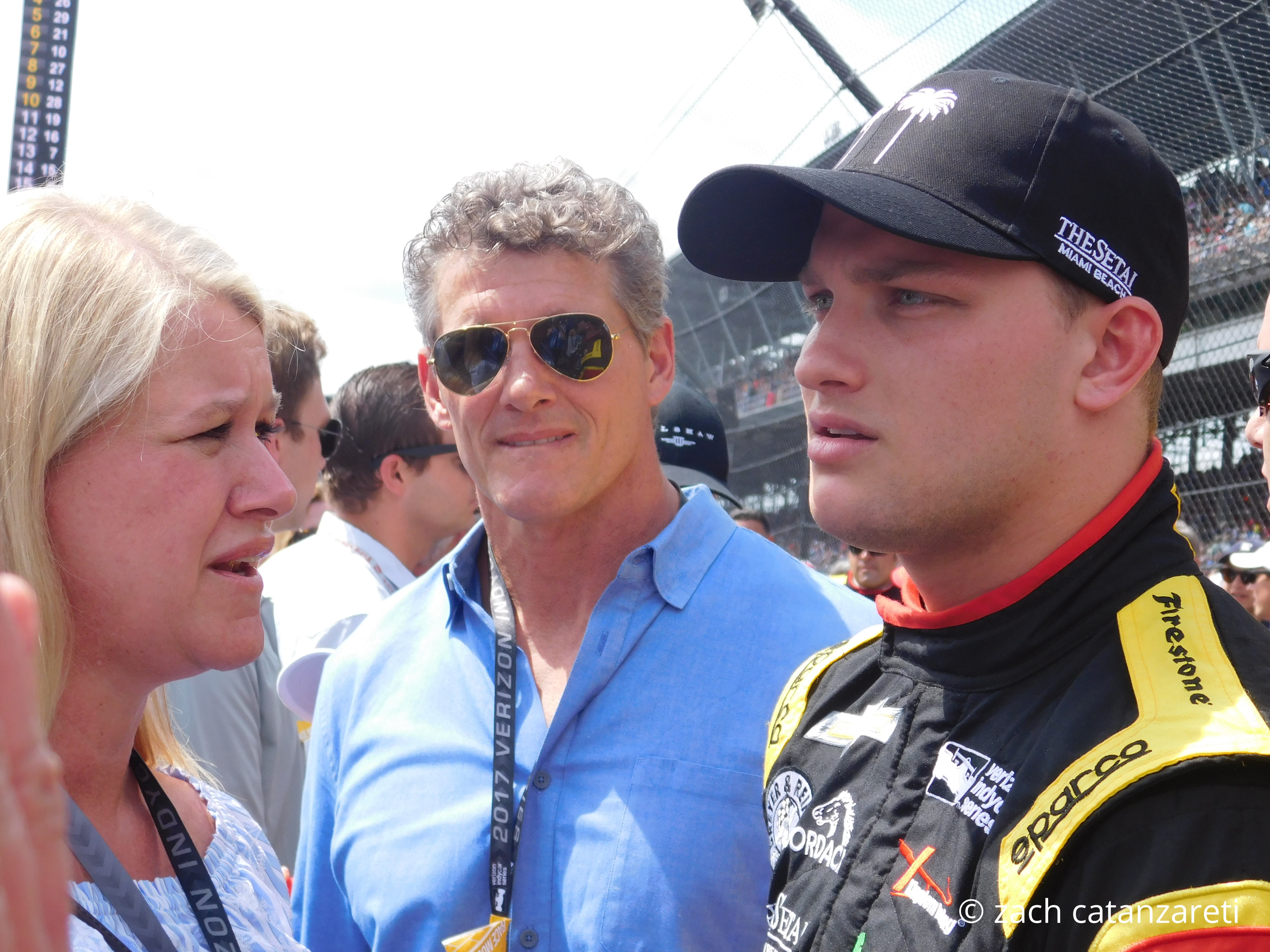
Karam and his father, Jody, on pit road before the 2017 Indianapolis 500

On a successive one-race agreement, again Dreyer & Reinbold signed Karam to drive the Mecum Auctions No. 24 Dallara-Chevrolet for the 2017 Indianapolis 500. Having improved from his 21st qualifying slot into the top-ten, Karam retired his Mecum Auctions Dreyer & Reinbold entry at the 275-mile juncture, with a dead battery. He joined the team again in 2018, sponsored by Wix, but crashed the car on lap 154.

In 2019, Karam again drove for Dreyer & Reinbold in the 2019 Indianapolis 500. He started 31st and finished nineteenth. It was announced on July 2, 2019 that Karam would drive for Carlin in the Honda Indy Toronto.

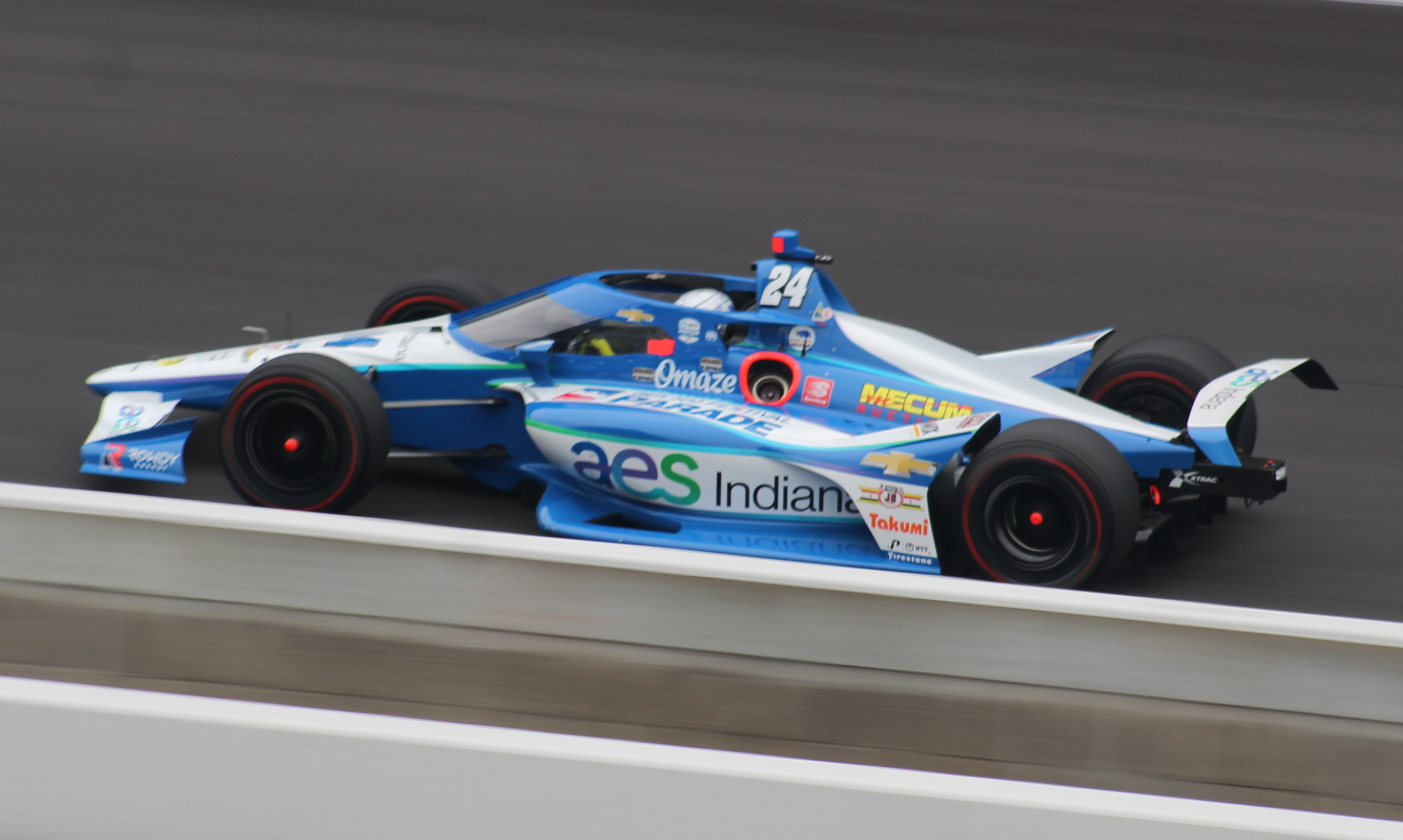
Karam's 2021 Indianapolis 500 car

On January 7, 2020, Dreyer & Reinbold Racing announced that they would be expanding their race schedule to at least four races with Karam driving them. These races include the Firestone Grand Prix of St. Petersburg, GMR Grand Prix, 2020 Indianapolis 500, and Honda Indy Toronto. A pit error in the Indy 500 took the team out of contention.

On May 23, 2021, Karam joined Will Power of Australia and Simona de Silvestro of Switzerland as the final three drivers to qualify in the eleventh and last row for the 105th running of the Indy 500. He earned the seventh position, his best Indy 500 finish ever.

=== Rallycross ===
Karam was signed by Dreyer & Reinbold Racing on a five-race contract for the 2019 Americas Rallycross Championship season. He performed well, never finishing lower than second and earned a win at Mid-Ohio Sports Car Course. In 2021, he returned to rallycross with Dreyer & Reinbold Racing to compete in Nitro Rallycross. He finished second in the championship standings, earning five wins and seven podiums.

=== NASCAR ===
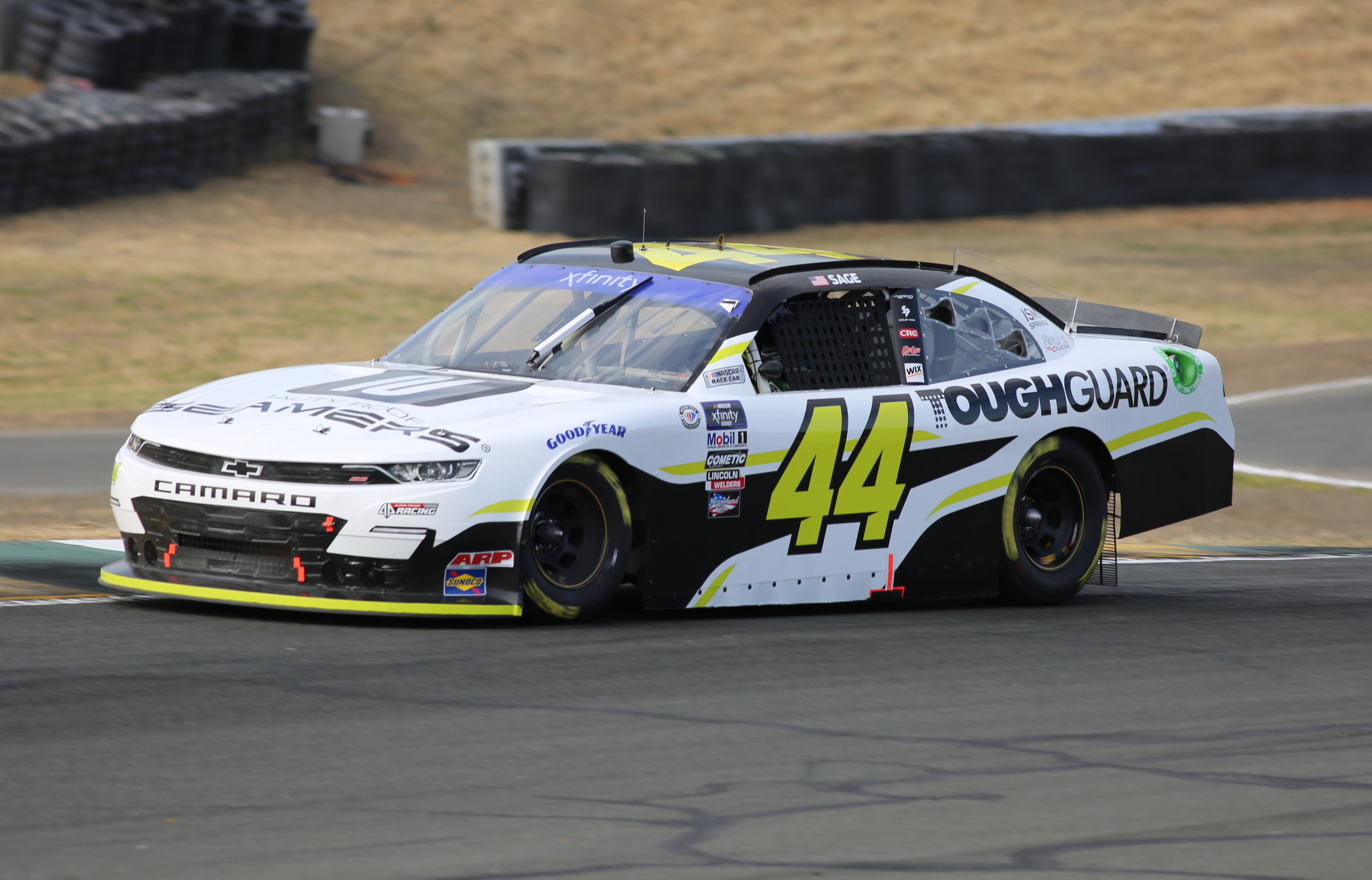
Karam's No. 44 car at Sonoma Raceway in 2023

On July 26, 2021, it was announced that Karam would make his NASCAR debut in the No. 31 for Jordan Anderson Racing in the Xfinity Series' Pennzoil 150 at the Indianapolis Motor Speedway road course. His schedule with JAR was eventually expanded to include the Xfinity races at Bristol Motor Speedway and the Charlotte Motor Speedway Roval, as well as the Camping World Truck Series event at Martinsville Speedway.

Karam signed with Alpha Prime Racing for a part-time Xfinity schedule in 2022. At Road America, Karam had an on-road scuffle with Noah Gragson, resulting in Gragson intentionally spinning out Karam and triggering a thirteen-car pileup on lap 25. Gragson was fined US$35,000 and docked thirty driver and owner points for the incident.

On September 14, 2022, Karam stated in an interview with Dustin Albino from Jayski that he would like to have a full-time NASCAR ride in 2023 after having run part-time in 2021 and 2022. On December 2, it was announced that Karam would return to APR to run at least 17 races for them in 2023 with the possibility of a full season if sponsorship can be found. Sponsorship for a full season was not found and Karam ran part-time for APR again in the Xfinity Series in 2023. He also drove the Sam Hunt Racing No. 24 car in the race at Road America. Karam would end up finishing fourth in that race. He battled for the win in the closing laps and held the lead for part of the second-to-last lap. After his impressive performance in that race, he got a ride for the race at Michigan the following week in the MBM Motorsports No. 66 car. Karam also stated in an interview after his top-five finish at Road America that he hopes to get a full-time NASCAR ride in 2024.

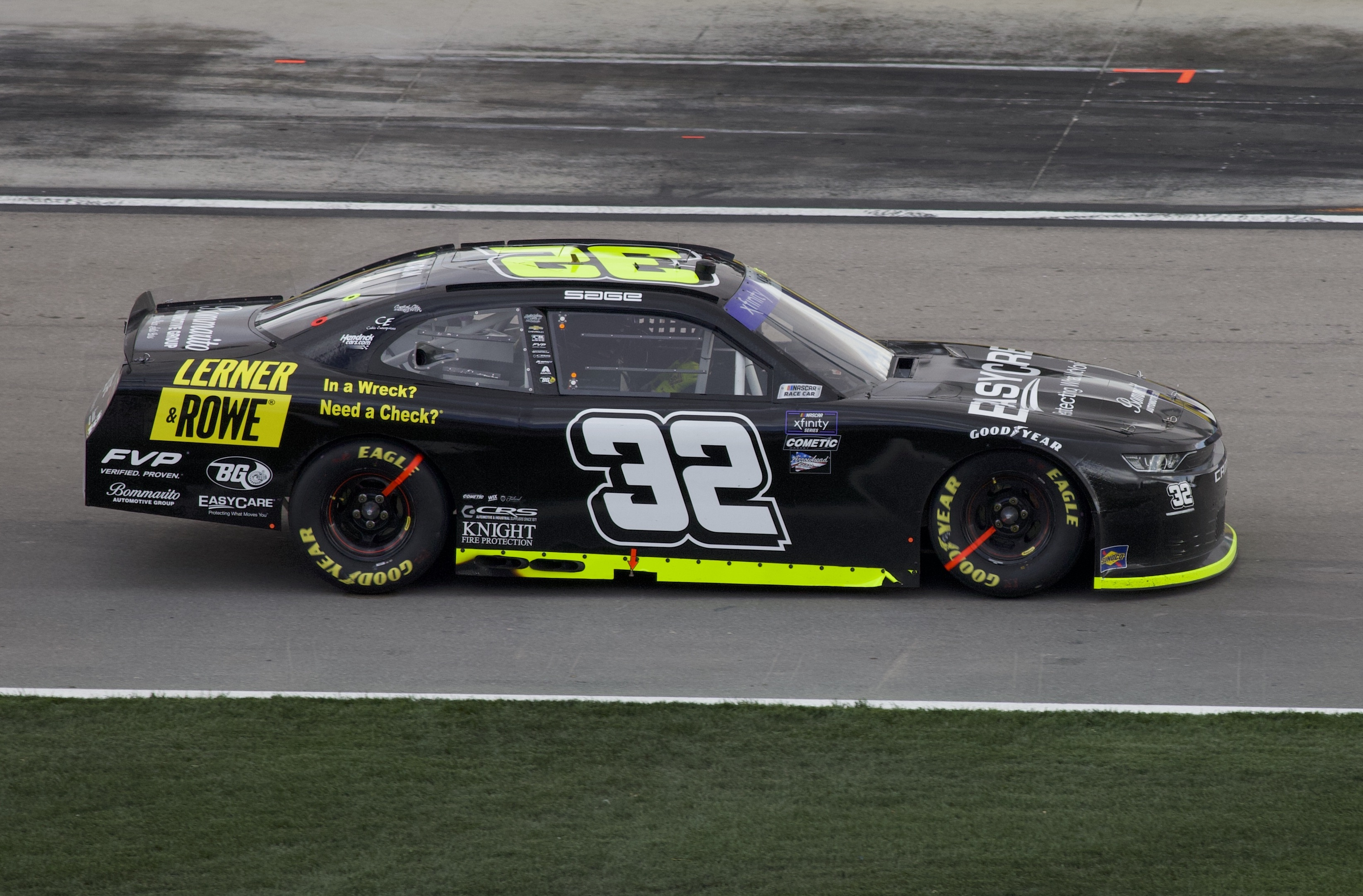
Karam's No. 32 car at Las Vegas Motor Speedway in 2024

Karam did not end up getting a full-time NASCAR ride again in 2024 and on January 23 was announced to run part-time for Sam Hunt Racing again in the Xfinity Series beginning at the season-opener at Daytona in the team's No. 26 car. On February 27, it was revealed that Karam would run the Xfinity Series race at Las Vegas in March for Jordan Anderson Racing in their No. 32 car. Karam previously drove part-time for JAR in the Xfinity and Truck Series in 2021.

== Personal life ==
Karam is of Lebanese heritage. He lives in Easton, Pennsylvania with his wife Abigail and three dogs. The two were married on July 16, 2021. He has a younger sister, Sydnee Karam, a swimmer. He graduated from Nazareth Area High School in 2014.

== Racing record ==
=== Career summary ===
Season	Series	Team	Races	Wins	Poles	F/Laps	Podiums	Points	Position
2009	Skip Barber National Presented by Mazda		14	2	2	2	4	339	**3rd**
2010	U.S. F2000 National Championship	Andretti Autosport	12	9	11	9	11	351	**1st**
2011	Star Mazda Championship	Andretti Autosport	11	2	2	2	4	364	5th
2012	Star Mazda Championship	Andretti Autosport	17	3	2	3	10	325	**3rd**
2013	Indy Lights	Schmidt Peterson Motorsports	12	3	3	1	9	460	**1st**
2014	IndyCar Series	Dreyer & Reinbold - Kingdom Racing	1	0	0	0	0	57	27th
2014	United SportsCar Championship - Prototype	Chip Ganassi Racing	4	0	0	0	1	104	23rd
2015	IndyCar Series	Chip Ganassi Racing	12	0	0	0	1	197	20th
2015	United SportsCar Championship - Prototype	Chip Ganassi Racing	1	0	0	0	0	26	27th
2016	IndyCar Series	Dreyer & Reinbold Racing	1	0	0	0	0	22	32nd
2017	IndyCar Series	Dreyer & Reinbold Racing	1	0	0	0	0	23	34th
2017	IMSA SportsCar Championship - GTD	3GT Racing	12	0	1	0	0	244	15th
2018	IndyCar Series	Dreyer & Reinbold Racing	1	0	0	0	0	10	40th
2019	Americas Rallycross - ARX2	Dreyer & Reinbold Racing	5	1	0	0	5	129	6th
2019	IndyCar Series	Dreyer & Reinbold Racing	1	0	0	0	0	39	27th
2019	IndyCar Series	Carlin	2	0	0	0	0	39	27th
2020	IndyCar Series	Dreyer & Reinbold Racing	4	0	0	0	0	32	29th
2021	IndyCar Series	Dreyer & Reinbold Racing	1	0	0	0	0	53	30th
2021	NASCAR Xfinity Series	Jordan Anderson Racing	4	0	0	N/A	N/A	62	45th
2021	NASCAR Camping World Truck Series	Jordan Anderson Racing	1	0	0	N/A	N/A	0	NC†
2021	Nitro Rallycross - NEXT	Dreyer & Reinbold Racing	10	5	0	0	7	385	**2nd**
2022	IndyCar Series	Dreyer & Reinbold Racing	1	0	0	0	0	14	34th
2022	NASCAR Xfinity Series	Alpha Prime Racing	7	0	0	N/A	N/A	152	37th
2022	NASCAR Xfinity Series	Our Motorsports	2	0	0	N/A	N/A	152	37th
2023	NASCAR Xfinity Series	Alpha Prime Racing	8	0	0	N/A	N/A	160	35th
2023	NASCAR Xfinity Series	Sam Hunt Racing	1	0	0	N/A	N/A	160	35th
2023	NASCAR Xfinity Series	MBM Motorsports	3	0	0	N/A	N/A	160	35th
2024	NASCAR Xfinity Series	Sam Hunt Racing	4	0	0	N/A	N/A	59	48th
2024	NASCAR Xfinity Series	Jordan Anderson Racing	1	0	0	N/A	N/A	59	48th
2024	NASCAR Xfinity Series	SS-Green Light Racing	1	0	0	N/A	N/A	59	48th
2024	NASCAR Craftsman Truck Series	Floridian Motorsports	1	0	0	N/A	N/A	0	NC†
2025	NASCAR Xfinity Series	Joey Gase Motorsports with Scott Osteen	4	0	0	0	N/A	29	53rd
2026	NASCAR O'Reilly Auto Parts Series	Joey Gase Motorsports with Scott Osteen	1	0	0	0	N/A	2	66th
2026	ARCA Menards Series West	Strike Mamba Racing	1	0	0	0	N/A	31	65th

=== American open–wheel racing results ===
(key)

==== U.S. F2000 National Championship ====
Year	Team	1	2	3	4	5	6	7	8	9	10	11	12	Rank	Points
2010	Andretti Autosport	STP; 1	STP; 1	ORP; 2	IOW; 1	NJM; 1	NJM; 9	ACC; 2	ACC; 1	ROA; 1	ROA; 1	ATL; 1	ATL; 1	**1st**	**351**

==== Star Mazda Championship ====
Year	Team	1	2	3	4	5	6	7	8	9	10	11	12	13	14	15	16	17	Rank	Points
2011	Andretti Autosport	STP; 15	BAR; 9	IND; 3	MIL; 1	IOW; 1	MOS; 13	TRO; 4	TRO; 5	SON; 4	BAL; 2	LAG; 16							**5th**	**364**
2012	Andretti Autosport	STP; 8	STP; 7	BAR; 2	BAR; 12	IND; 2	IOW; 1	TOR; 21	TOR; 3	EDM; 2	EDM; 2	TRO; 2	TRO; 1	BAL; 15	BAL; 1	LAG; 7	LAG; 19	ATL; 2	**3rd**	**325**

==== Indy Lights ====
Year	Team	1	2	3	4	5	6	7	8	9	10	11	12	Rank	Points
2013	Schmidt Peterson Motorsports	STP; 3	ALA; 4	LBH; 3	INDY; 3	MIL; 1	IOW; 1	POC; 2	TOR; 6	MOH; 8	BAL; 2	HOU; 1	FON; 3	**1st**	**460**

==== IndyCar Series ====
(key)

Year	Team	No.	Chassis	Engine	1	2	3	4	5	6	7	8	9	10	11	12	13	14	15	16	17	18	Rank	Points	Ref
2014	Dreyer & Reinbold Kingdom Racing	22	Dallara DW12	Chevrolet	STP	LBH	ALA	IMS	INDY; 9	DET	DET	TXS	HOU	HOU	POC	IOW	TOR	TOR	MOH	MIL	SNM	FON	27th	57	
2015	Chip Ganassi Racing	8	Dallara DW12	Chevrolet	STP; 19	NLA; 18	LBH	ALA; 18	IMS	INDY; 32	DET; 16	DET; 12	TXS; 12	TOR	FON; 5	MIL; 19	IOW; 3	MOH; 22	POC; 14	SNM			20th	197	
2016	Dreyer & Reinbold Racing	24	Dallara DW12	Chevrolet	STP	PHX	LBH	ALA	IMS	INDY; 32	DET	DET	ELK	IOW	TOR	MOH	POC	TXS	WGL	SNM			32nd	22	
2017	Dreyer & Reinbold Racing	24	Dallara DW12	Chevrolet	STP	LBH	ALA	PHX	IMS	INDY; 28	DET	DET	TXS	ELK	IOW	TOR	MOH	POC	GTW	WGL	SNM		34th	23	
2018	Dreyer & Reinbold Racing	24	Dallara DW12	Chevrolet	STP	PHX	LBH	ALA	IMS	INDY; 26	DET	DET	TXS	ELK	IOW	TOR	MOH	POC	GTW	POR	SNM		40th	10	
2019	Dreyer & Reinbold Racing	24	Dallara DW12	Chevrolet	STP	COA	ALA	LBH	IMS	INDY; 19	DET	DET	TXS	ELK									27th	39	
2019	Carlin	31	Dallara DW12	Chevrolet											TOR; 21	IOW; 22	MOH	POC	GTW	POR	LAG		27th	39	
2020	Dreyer & Reinbold Racing	24	Dallara DW12	Chevrolet	TXS	IMS; 23	ROA	ROA	IOW	IOW	INDY; 24	GTW	GTW	MOH	MOH	IMS; 23	IMS; 24	STP					29th	32	
2021	Dreyer & Reinbold Racing	24	Dallara DW12	Chevrolet	ALA	STP	TXS	TXS	IMS	INDY; 7	DET	DET	ROA	MOH	NSH	IMS	GTW	POR	LAG	LBH			30th	53	
2022	Dreyer & Reinbold Racing	24	Dallara DW12	Chevrolet	STP	TXS	LBH	ALA	IMS	INDY; 23	DET	ROA	MOH	TOR	IOW	IOW	IMS	NSH	GTW	POR	LAG		34th	14	

* Season still in progress.

Years	Teams	Races	Poles	Wins	Podiums (non-win)**	Top 10s (non-podium)***	Indianapolis 500 wins	Championships
4	2	16	0	0	1	2	0	0

** Podium (non-win) indicates 2nd or 3rd-place finishes.
*** Top 10s (non-podium) indicates 4th through 10th-place finishes.

==== Indianapolis 500 ====
Year	Chassis	Engine	Start	Finish	Team
2014	Dallara	Chevrolet	31	9	Dreyer & Reinbold Racing
2015	Dallara	Chevrolet	22	32	Chip Ganassi Racing
2016	Dallara	Chevrolet	23	32	Dreyer & Reinbold Racing / Kingdom Racing
2017	Dallara	Chevrolet	21	28	Dreyer & Reinbold Racing
2018	Dallara	Chevrolet	24	26	Dreyer & Reinbold Racing
2019	Dallara	Chevrolet	31	19	Dreyer & Reinbold Racing
2020	Dallara	Chevrolet	31	24	Dreyer & Reinbold Racing
2021	Dallara	Chevrolet	31	7	Dreyer & Reinbold Racing
2022	Dallara	Chevrolet	22	23	Dreyer & Reinbold Racing

=== Complete WeatherTech SportsCar Championship results ===
(key) (Races in bold indicate pole position, Results are overall/class)

Year	Team	Class	Make	Engine	1	2	3	4	5	6	7	8	9	10	11	12	Rank	Points
2014	Chip Ganassi Racing	P	Ford EcoBoost Riley DP	Ford Ecoboost 3.5 L V6 Turbo	DAY; 11	SEB; 6	LBH	LGA	DET	WGL; 8	MOS	IMS; 2	ELK	COA	PET		23rd	104
2015	Chip Ganassi Racing	P	Ford EcoBoost Riley DP	Ford Ecoboost 3.5 L V6 Turbo	DAY; 6	SIR	LBH	LGA	DET	WGL	MSP	ELK	COA	PET			27th	26
2017	3GT Racing	GTD	Lexus RC F GT3	Lexus 5.0 L V8	DAY; 27	SEB; 18	LBH; 6	COA; 9	DET; 6	WGL; 6	**MOS**; 5	LIM; 12	ELK; 8	VIR; 7	LGA; 14	PET; 10	15th	244

=== American rallycross racing results ===
==== Complete Americas Rallycross results ====
(key)

Year	Team	Car	Class	1	2	3	4	5	6	7	8	9	Rank	Points
2019	Dreyer & Reinbold Racing	Olsbergs MSE	ARX2	MOH		GAT		TRR		COTA	MOH		**6th**	**129**
2019	Dreyer & Reinbold Racing	Olsbergs MSE	ARX2	2	2	DNP	DNP	DNP	DNP	2	1	2	**6th**	**129**

==== Complete Nitro Rallycross results ====
Year	Team	Car	Class	1	2	3	4	5	6	7	8	9	10	Rank	Points
2021	Dreyer & Reinbold Racing	Olsbergs MSE	NEXT	UT		ERX		WHP		GHR		FIRM		**2nd**	**385**
2021	Dreyer & Reinbold Racing	Olsbergs MSE	NEXT	DNS	5	7	1	1	1	3	2	1	1	**2nd**	**385**

=== NASCAR ===
(key) (Bold – Pole position awarded by qualifying time. Italics – Pole position earned by points standings or practice time. * – Most laps led.)

==== O'Reilly Auto Parts Series ====
NASCAR O'Reilly Auto Parts Series results
Year	Team	No.	Make	1	2	3	4	5	6	7	8	9	10	11	12	13	14	15	16	17	18	19	20	21	22	23	24	25	26	27	28	29	30	31	32	33	NOAPSC	Pts	Ref
2021	Jordan Anderson Racing	31	Chevy	DAY	DRC	HOM	LVS	PHO	ATL	MAR	TAL	DAR	DOV	COA	CLT	MOH	TEX	NSH	POC	ROA	ATL	NHA	GLN	IRC; 26	MCH	DAY	DAR	RCH	BRI; 16	LVS	TAL	ROV; 25	TEX	KAN	MAR	PHO; 25	45th	62	
2022	Alpha Prime Racing	44	Chevy	DAY	CAL	LVS	PHO	ATL; 32	COA; 16	RCH	MAR	TAL	DOV	DAR	TEX	CLT	PIR	NSH		ATL; 38	NHA					DAY; 5	DAR	KAN									37th	152	
2022	Alpha Prime Racing	45	Chevy																ROA; 31			POC; 20	IRC; 13	MCH	GLN												37th	152	
2022	Our Motorsports	02	Chevy																										BRI; 18	TEX	TAL	ROV; 30	LVS	HOM	MAR	PHO	37th	152	
2023	Alpha Prime Racing	45	Chevy	DAY	CAL	LVS	PHO	ATL; 31																	IRC; 15	GLN; 15	DAY	DAR	KAN	BRI							35th	160	
2023	Alpha Prime Racing	44	Chevy						COA; 35	RCH	MAR	TAL	DOV	DAR; 31	CLT	PIR	SON; 34	NSH; DNQ	CSC; 22	ATL	NHA	POC; 38															35th	160	
2023	Sam Hunt Racing	24	Toyota																				ROA; 4														35th	160	
2023	MBM Motorsports	66	Ford																					MCH; 25							TEX; 23	ROV; 27	LVS	HOM	MAR	PHO	35th	160	
2024	Sam Hunt Racing	26	Toyota	DAY; 28	ATL			COA; 17	RCH	MAR	TEX	TAL	DOV	DAR	CLT	PIR; 34					CSC; 33	POC	IND	MCH	DAY	DAR	ATL	GLN	BRI	KAN	TAL						48th	59	
2024	Jordan Anderson Racing	32	Chevy			LVS; 36	PHO																														48th	59	
2024	Joey Gase Motorsports	35	Toyota														SON; DNQ	IOW	NHA	NSH																	48th	59	
2024	SS-Green Light Racing	07	Chevy																													ROV; 29	LVS	HOM	MAR	PHO	48th	59	
2025	Joey Gase Motorsports with Scott Osteen	53	Toyota	DAY	ATL	COA; 34	PHO	LVS	HOM	MAR	DAR	BRI	CAR	TAL	TEX	CLT	NSH	MXC; 33	POC	ATL	CSC; DNQ	SON; 36	DOV	IND	IOW	GLN	DAY	PIR	GTW	BRI	KAN	ROV; 25	LVS	TAL	MAR	PHO	53rd	29	
2026	Joey Gase Motorsports with Scott Osteen	55	Toyota	DAY	ATL	COA; 35	PHO	LVS	DAR	MAR	CAR	BRI	KAN	TAL	TEX	GLN	DOV	CLT	NSH	POC	COR	SON	CHI	ATL	IND	IOW	DAY	DAR	GTW	BRI	LVS	CLT	PHO	TAL	MAR	HOM	66th	2	

==== Craftsman Truck Series ====
NASCAR Craftsman Truck Series results
Year	Team	No.	Make	1	2	3	4	5	6	7	8	9	10	11	12	13	14	15	16	17	18	19	20	21	22	23	NCTC	Pts	Ref
2021	Jordan Anderson Racing	3	Chevy	DAY	DRC	LVS	ATL	BRD	RCH	KAN	DAR	COA	CLT	TEX	NSH	POC	KNX	GLN	GTW	DAR	BRI	LVS	TAL	MAR; 32	PHO		113th	0^{1}	
2024	Floridian Motorsports	21	Ford	DAY	ATL	LVS	BRI	COA	MAR	TEX	KAN	DAR	NWS	CLT	GTW	NSH	POC; 33	IRP	RCH	MLW	BRI	KAN	TAL	HOM	MAR	PHO	89th	0^{1}	

=== ARCA Menards Series West ===
(key) (Bold – Pole position awarded by qualifying time. Italics – Pole position earned by points standings or practice time. * – Most laps led. ** – All laps led.)

ARCA Menards Series West results
Year	Team	No.	Make	1	2	3	4	5	6	7	8	9	10	11	12	13	AMSWC	Pts	Ref
2026	Strike Mamba Racing	72	Chevy	KER	PHO	TUC	SHA	CNS	TRI	SON; 13	PIR	AAS	MAD	LVS	PHO	KER	65th	31	

^{*} Season still in progress
^{1} Ineligible for series points

Sporting positions
Preceded by Tristan Vautier	Indy Lights Champion; 2013	Succeeded by Gabby Chaves
