= WHLJ =

WHLJ may refer to:

- WHLJ (AM), a radio station (1400 AM) licensed to serve Moultrie, Georgia, United States
- WHLJ-FM, a radio station (97.5 FM) licensed to Statenville, Georgia
