= 2013 Indy Lights =

2013 Indy Lights season
- Firestone Indy Lights

Season
- Races: 12
- Start date: March 24
- End date: October 19

Awards
- Drivers' champion: Sage Karam
- Teams' champion: Sam Schmidt Motorsports

The 2013 Indy Lights season was a season of open wheel motor racing. It was the 28th season of the series and the twelfth sanctioned by IndyCar, acting as the primary support series for the IZOD IndyCar Series. It began March 24, 2013 in St. Petersburg.

It was a season with a very low number of entries, with the Grand Prix races having between 8 and 12 drivers at most.

Rookie Sage Karam won the championship, the eighth rookie to win the series title. Karam clinched the championship in the final race over rookie teammate Gabby Chaves. Second-year driver Carlos Muñoz won a series-high four races but was forced to settle for third in the championship. Peter Dempsey captured the Freedom 100 in a spectacular four-wide finish in what was the closest finish in Indianapolis Motor Speedway history.

In June, it was announced that the series would be promoted by Andersen Promotions beginning in 2014. INDYCAR sanctioning will remain. In August it was announced that Cooper Tire would replace Firestone as the official tire of the series in 2014.

== Team and driver chart ==
- All drivers will compete in Firestone Firehawk–shod Dallara chassis.

Team	No.	Drivers	Rounds
Schmidt Peterson Motorsports	7	(Colombia) Gabby Chaves	All
Schmidt Peterson Motorsports	8	(United States) Sage Karam	All
Schmidt Peterson Motorsports	67	(United States) Kyle O'Gara (Note: In conjunction with Sarah Fisher Hartman Racing.)	4, 12
Schmidt Peterson Motorsports	77	(United Kingdom) Jack Hawksworth	All
Team Moore Racing	2	(Mexico) Juan Pablo García	1–10
Team Moore Racing	2	(Republic of Ireland) Peter Dempsey	11
Team Moore Racing	22	(United States) Ethan Ringel	1
Team Moore Racing	22	(Brazil) Victor Carbone	2
Team Moore Racing	22	(Canada) Mikaël Grenier	3
Team Moore Racing	22	(United States) Jimmy Simpson	4
Team Moore Racing	22	(United States) Conor Daly	11
Andretti Autosport; AFS Racing	12	(United States) Zach Veach	All
Andretti Autosport; AFS Racing	26	(Colombia) Carlos Muñoz	All
Belardi Auto Racing	4	(Venezuela) Jorge Goncalvez	All
Belardi Auto Racing	5	(Republic of Ireland) Peter Dempsey	1–10
Belardi Auto Racing	5	(Mexico) Juan Pablo García	11–12
Belardi Auto Racing	6	(Venezuela) Giancarlo Serenelli	9–12
Bryan Herta Autosport; Jeffery Mark Motorsports	28	(United States) Chase Austin	4
Bryan Herta Autosport; Jeffery Mark Motorsports	28	(Zimbabwe) Axcil Jefferies	9, 11
MDL Racing	56	(Canada) Matthew Di Leo	3, 8–11
Pabst Racing	17	(Canada) Dalton Kellett	10

- 2012 Star Mazda Champion Jack Hawksworth earned a $500,000 scholarship for his Championship season. Hawksworth will drive for Schmidt Peterson Motorsports in its No. 77 machine.

== Schedule ==
IndyCar announced the 2013 Indy Lights schedule on October 18, 2012. It joined all IndyCar Series weekends in North America except Detroit, Texas and Sonoma.

Rnd	Date	Race Name	Track	Location
1	March 23–24	(United States) St. Petersburg 100	Streets of St. Petersburg	St. Petersburg, Florida
2	April 6–7	(United States) Legacy Indy Lights 100	Barber Motorsports Park	Birmingham, Alabama
3	April 20–21	(United States) Long Beach 100	Streets of Long Beach	Long Beach, California
4	May 24	(United States) Firestone Freedom 100	Indianapolis Motor Speedway	Speedway, Indiana
5	June 14–15	(United States) Milwaukee Race	Milwaukee Mile	West Allis, Wisconsin
6	June 22–23	(United States) Iowa Speedway 100	Iowa Speedway	Newton, Iowa
7	July 6–7	(United States) Pocono Race	Pocono Raceway	Long Pond, Pennsylvania
8	July 12–13	(Canada) Grand Prix of Toronto	Exhibition Place	Toronto
9	August 3–4	(United States) Grand Prix of Mid-Ohio	Mid-Ohio Sports Car Course	Lexington, Ohio
10	August 31 – September 1	(United States) Grand Prix of Baltimore	Streets of Baltimore	Baltimore, Maryland
11	October 5–6	(United States) Grand Prix of Houston	Reliant Park	Houston, Texas
12	October 18–19	(United States) Lefty's Kids Club 100	Auto Club Speedway	Fontana, California

Oval/Speedway
Street/Temporary Circuit
Road Course

== Race results ==
Rd.	Race	Pole position	Fastest lap	Most laps led	Winning driver	Winning team
1	(United States) St. Petersburg	(Colombia) Carlos Muñoz	(Colombia) Carlos Muñoz	(United Kingdom) Jack Hawksworth	(United Kingdom) Jack Hawksworth	(United States) Sam Schmidt Motorsports
2	(United States) Barber	(Colombia) Carlos Muñoz	(Colombia) Carlos Muñoz	(Colombia) Carlos Muñoz	(Colombia) Carlos Muñoz	(United States) Andretti Autosport
3	(United States) Long Beach	(Colombia) Carlos Muñoz	(Colombia) Carlos Muñoz	(Colombia) Carlos Muñoz	(Colombia) Carlos Muñoz	(United States) Andretti Autosport
4	(United States) Indianapolis	(United States) Sage Karam	(Republic of Ireland) Peter Dempsey	(Colombia) Carlos Muñoz	(Republic of Ireland) Peter Dempsey	(United States) Belardi Auto Racing
5	(United States) Milwaukee	(United States) Sage Karam	(United States) Zach Veach	(United States) Zach Veach	(United States) Sage Karam	(United States) Sam Schmidt Motorsports
6	(United States) Iowa	(Colombia) Carlos Muñoz	(Colombia) Carlos Muñoz	(United States) Sage Karam	(United States) Sage Karam	(United States) Sam Schmidt Motorsports
7	(United States) Pocono	(Colombia) Carlos Muñoz	(Colombia) Gabby Chaves	(Colombia) Carlos Muñoz	(Colombia) Carlos Muñoz	(United States) Andretti Autosport
8	(Canada) Toronto	(United Kingdom) Jack Hawksworth	(United Kingdom) Jack Hawksworth	(United Kingdom) Jack Hawksworth	(United Kingdom) Jack Hawksworth	(United States) Sam Schmidt Motorsports
9	(United States) Mid-Ohio	(Colombia) Gabby Chaves	(Colombia) Carlos Muñoz	(Colombia) Gabby Chaves	(Colombia) Gabby Chaves	(United States) Sam Schmidt Motorsports
10	(United States) Baltimore	(United Kingdom) Jack Hawksworth	(United Kingdom) Jack Hawksworth	(United Kingdom) Jack Hawksworth	(United Kingdom) Jack Hawksworth	(United States) Sam Schmidt Motorsports
11	(United States) Houston	(United States) Sage Karam	(Colombia) Gabby Chaves	(United States) Sage Karam	(United States) Sage Karam	(United States) Sam Schmidt Motorsports
12	(United States) Fontana	(United States) Zach Veach	(United States) Sage Karam	(Colombia) Carlos Muñoz	(Colombia) Carlos Muñoz	(United States) Andretti Autosport

== Driver standings ==
Points system

Position	1	2	3	4	5	6	7	8	9	10	11	12
Points	50	40	35	32	30	28	26	24	22	20	19	18

- Ties in points broken by number of wins, or best finishes.

Pos	Driver	STP (United States)	BAR (United States)	LBH (United States)	INDY (United States)	MIL (United States)	IOW (United States)	POC (United States)	TOR (Canada)	MOH (United States)	BAL (United States)	HOU (United States)	FON (United States)	Pts
1	(United States) Sage Karam RY	3	4	3	**3**	**1**	1*	2	6	8	2	**1***^{1}	3	460
2	(Colombia) Gabby Chaves R	8	3	2	2	4	2	3	3	**1***	3	2	2	449
3	(Colombia) Carlos Muñoz	**7**	**1***	**1***	4*	2	**8**	**1***	4	4	9	12	1*	441
4	(United Kingdom) Jack Hawksworth R	1*	2	8	10	8	3	5	**1***	3	**1***	6	9	412
5	(Republic of Ireland) Peter Dempsey	2	6	10	1	6	4	7	2	2	4	9		360
6	(Venezuela) Jorge Goncalvez	6	5	4	6	7	5	8	8	9	5	4	5	336
7	(United States) Zach Veach R	5	9	9	5	3*	7	4	7	5	8	10	**4**	333
8	(Mexico) Juan Pablo García	4	8	6	9	5	6	6	5	6	DNS	8	6	312
9	(Canada) Matthew Di Leo R			5					9	10	6	11		119
10	(Venezuela) Giancarlo Serenelli R									11	7	7	7	97
11	(Zimbabwe) Axcil Jefferies R									7		5		56
12	(United States) Kyle O'Gara R				11								8	43
13	(United States) Conor Daly											3		35
14	(Brazil) Victor Carbone		7											26
15	(Canada) Mikaël Grenier R			7										26
16	(United States) Jimmy Simpson R				7									26
17	(United States) Chase Austin				8									24
18	(United States) Ethan Ringel R	9												22
19	(Canada) Dalton Kellett R										10			20
Pos	Driver	STP (United States)	BAR (United States)	LBH (United States)	INDY (United States)	MIL (United States)	IOW (United States)	POC (United States)	TOR (Canada)	MOH (United States)	BAL (United States)	HOU (United States)	FON (United States)	Pts

Color	Result
Gold	Winner
Silver	2nd place
Bronze	3rd place
Green	4th & 5th place
Light Blue	6th–10th place
Dark Blue	Finished (Outside Top 10)
Purple	Did not finish
Red	Did not qualify (DNQ)
Brown	Withdrawn (Wth)
Black	Disqualified (DSQ)
White	Did not start (DNS)
Blank	Did not participate (DNP)
Blank	Not competing

**In-line notation**
**Bold**	Pole position (1 point)
Italics	Ran fastest race lap
*	Led most race laps (2 points)
^{1}	Qualifying cancelled no bonus point awarded
Rookie of the Year
Rookie
