= 2010 U.S. F2000 National Championship =

Car racing competition

Seasons
- ← 2006 2011 →

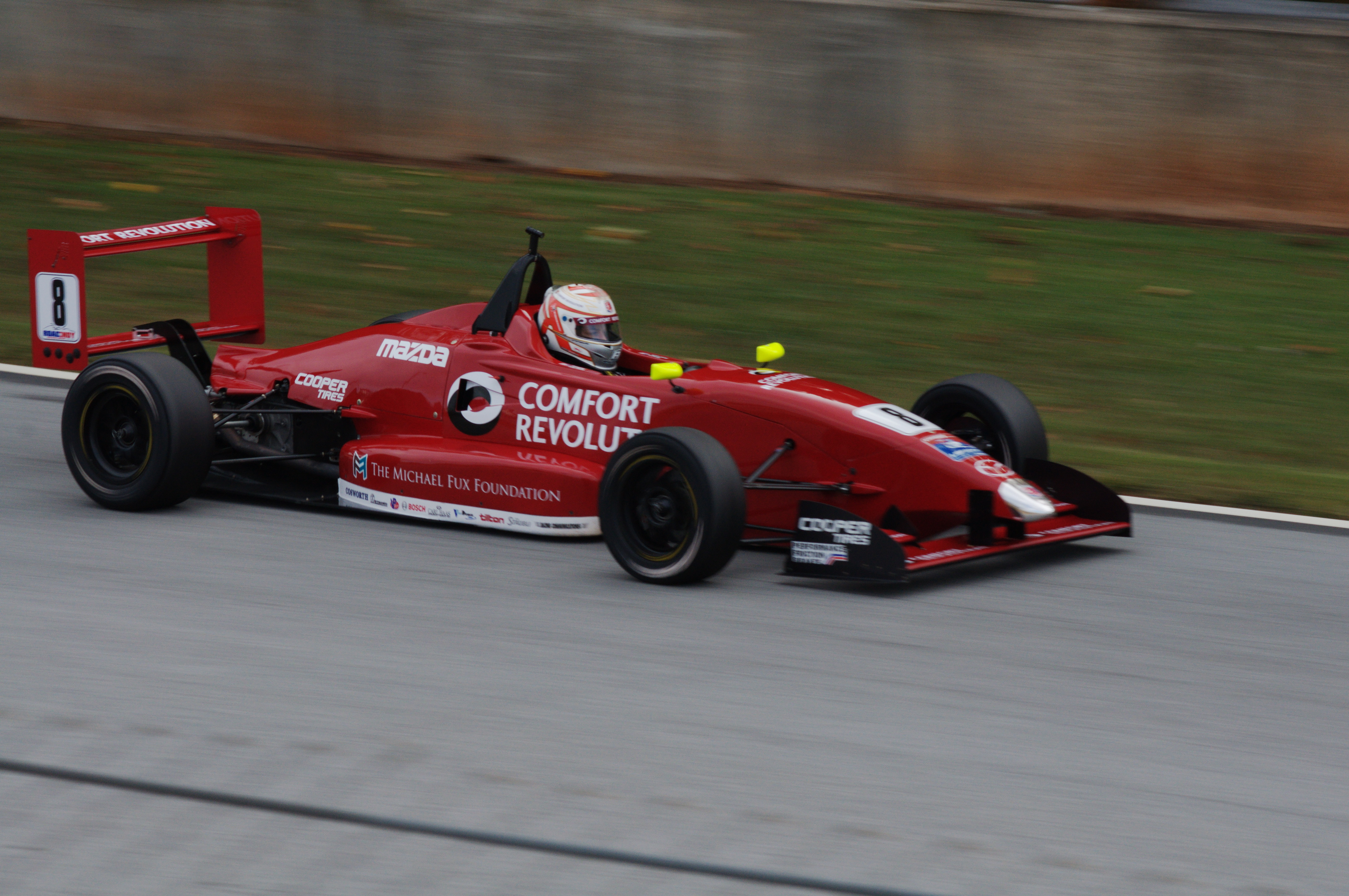
2010 champion Sage Karam

The 2010 Cooper Tires presents the U.S. F2000 National Championship powered by Mazda is the first U.S. F2000 National Championship season under the new management, sanctioned by the Indy Racing League. All cars will run Mazda MZR engines built by former driver Steve Knapp.

With victory in the first race at the final round at Road Atlanta, Sage Karam won the championship and a fully funded seat in the 2011 Star Mazda Championship.

== Drivers and teams ==
| Team | No. | Driver(s) | Status | Round(s) |
|---|---|---|---|---|
| (United States) Cape Motorsports w/ Wayne Taylor Racing | 2 | (Republic of Ireland) Patrick McKenna | | All |
| (United States) Cape Motorsports w/ Wayne Taylor Racing | 3 | (United Kingdom) Josh Fielding | | 1–3 |
| (United States) Cape Motorsports w/ Wayne Taylor Racing | 18 | (Chile) Javier Barrales | | 11–12 |
| (United States) JDC MotorSports | 5 | (Australia) Luke Ellery | U | 11–12 |
| (United States) JDC MotorSports | 10 | (Russia) Mikhail Goikhberg | | All |
| (United States) JDC MotorSports | 11 | (Brazil) Raphael Abbate | | All |
| (United States) JDC MotorSports | 19 | (Colombia) Martin Sala | | 1–2, 5–8 |
| (United States) Pabst Racing Services | 6 | (Chile) Martin Scuncio | | 1–2 |
| (United States) Pabst Racing Services | 6 | (Estonia) Tõnis Kasemets | U | 7–10 |
| (United States) Pabst Racing Services | 9 | (United States) J. R. Smart | N | 1–2, 4, 7–12 |
| (United States) Andretti Autosport | 7 | (United States) Zach Veach | | 3–12 |
| (United States) Andretti Autosport | 8 | (United States) Sage Karam | | All |
| (United States) Liberty Motorsports | 14 | (Aruba) Terrick Mansur | | 1–4 |
| (United States) Liberty Motorsports | 14 | (Puerto Rico) Félix Serrallés | U | 9–12 |
| (United States) Liberty Motorsports | 41 | (United States) Matthew Powers | | 1–2, 7–12 |
| (United States) Liberty Motorsports | 41 | (United States) Brian Belardi | N | 4 |
| Fuerza Chile Motorsports | 18 | (Chile) Javier Barrales | | 3–10 |
| Fuerza Chile Motorsports | 99 | (Chile) Martin Scuncio | | 3–10 |
| (United States) ZSports Midwest | 20 | (United States) Benjamin Searcy | | 1–2 |
| (United States) ZSports Midwest | 20 | (China) David Cheng | U | 9–10 |
| (United States) ZSports Midwest | 21 | (United States) Scott Anderson | U | 9–10 |
| (United States) AcceleRace MotorSports | 28 | (United States) Ardie Greenamyer | N | All |
| (United States) ArmsUp MotorSports | 31 | (United States) Joe Tovo | N | 3 |
| (Canada) AIM Autosport | 77 | (Canada) Anthony Furfari | | 1–2 |

| Icon | Legend |
|---|---|
| N | National Class |
| U | Unregistered drivers |

== Schedule ==
The schedule was announced on November 24, 2009. All championship rounds will be supporting the Star Mazda Championship. An exhibition meeting with two non-championship rounds will also be held at Mazda Raceway Laguna Seca over May 22–23, in support of the American Le Mans Series.

| Icon | Legend |
|---|---|
| O | Oval/Speedway |
| R | Road course |
| S | Street circuit |

| Rd. | Date | Track | Location | Supporting |
|---|---|---|---|---|
| 1 | March 27–28 | S Streets of St. Petersburg | St. Petersburg, Florida | IndyCar |
| 2 | March 27–28 | S Streets of St. Petersburg | St. Petersburg, Florida | IndyCar |
| NC | May 23 | R Mazda Raceway Laguna Seca | Monterey, California | ALMS |
| 3 | May 29 | O O'Reilly Raceway Park | Brownsburg, Indiana | USAC Midgets |
| 4 | June 19 | O Iowa Speedway | Newton, Iowa | IndyCar |
| 5 | June 26–27 | R New Jersey Motorsports Park | Millville, New Jersey | Star Mazda |
| 6 | June 26–27 | R New Jersey Motorsports Park | Millville, New Jersey | Star Mazda |
| 7 | July 31–August 1 | R Autobahn Country Club | Joliet, Illinois | Star Mazda |
| 8 | July 31–August 1 | R Autobahn Country Club | Joliet, Illinois | Star Mazda |
| 9 | August 21–22 | R Road America | Elkhart Lake, Wisconsin | ALMS |
| 10 | August 21–22 | R Road America | Elkhart Lake, Wisconsin | ALMS |
| 11 | September 30–October 1 | R Road Atlanta | Braselton, Georgia | ALMS |
| 12 | September 30–October 1 | R Road Atlanta | Braselton, Georgia | ALMS |

== Race results ==
| Rd. | Track | Pole position | Fastest lap | Most laps led | Race winner | |
| Rd. | Track | Pole position | Fastest lap | Most laps led | Driver | Team |
|---|---|---|---|---|---|---|
| 1 | Streets of St. Petersburg | (United States) Sage Karam | (United States) Sage Karam | (United States) Sage Karam | (United States) Sage Karam | (United States) Andretti Autosport |
| 2 | Streets of St. Petersburg | (United States) Sage Karam | (United States) Sage Karam | (United States) Sage Karam | (United States) Sage Karam | (United States) Andretti Autosport |
| NC | Mazda Raceway Laguna Seca^{1} | (United States) Sage Karam | (United States) Sage Karam | (Russia) Mikhail Goikhberg | (United States) Scott Rarick | (United States) PR1 Motorsports |
| NC | Mazda Raceway Laguna Seca^{1} | (United States) Sage Karam | (Russia) Mikhail Goikhberg | (United States) Sage Karam | (Russia) Mikhail Goikhberg | (United States) JDC Motorsports |
| 3 | O'Reilly Raceway Park | (Republic of Ireland) Patrick McKenna | (Russia) Mikhail Goikhberg | (United States) Sage Karam | (Republic of Ireland) Patrick McKenna | (United States) Cape Motorsports |
| 4 | Iowa Speedway | (United States) Sage Karam | (United States) Sage Karam | (United States) Sage Karam | (United States) Sage Karam | (United States) Andretti Autosport |
| 5 | New Jersey Motorsports Park | (United States) Sage Karam | (United States) Sage Karam | (United States) Sage Karam | (United States) Sage Karam | (United States) Andretti Autosport |
| 6 | New Jersey Motorsports Park | (United States) Sage Karam | (Russia) Mikhail Goikhberg | (Republic of Ireland) Patrick McKenna | (Republic of Ireland) Patrick McKenna | (United States) Cape Motorsports |
| 7 | Autobahn Country Club | (United States) Sage Karam | (United States) Sage Karam | (Estonia) Tõnis Kasemets | (Estonia) Tõnis Kasemets | (United States) Pabst Racing Services |
| 8 | Autobahn Country Club | (United States) Sage Karam | (Republic of Ireland) Patrick McKenna | (United States) Sage Karam | (United States) Sage Karam | (United States) Andretti Autosport |
| 9 | Road America | (United States) Sage Karam | (United States) Sage Karam | (United States) Sage Karam | (United States) Sage Karam | (United States) Andretti Autosport |
| 10 | Road America | (United States) Sage Karam | (United States) Sage Karam | (United States) Sage Karam | (United States) Sage Karam | (United States) Andretti Autosport |
| 11 | Road Atlanta | (United States) Sage Karam | (United States) Sage Karam | (United States) Sage Karam | (United States) Sage Karam | (United States) Andretti Autosport |
| 12 | Road Atlanta | (United States) Sage Karam | (United States) Sage Karam | (United States) Sage Karam | (United States) Sage Karam | (United States) Andretti Autosport |

^{1}Mazda Raceway Laguna Seca round was a non-points event run in conjunction with the Pacific F2000 Championship.

== Championship standings ==
=== Drivers' ===
| Pos | Driver | STP | | ORP | IOW | NJ | | ACC | | ROA | | ATL | | Points |
Championship Class
| 1 | (United States) Sage Karam | **1*** | **1*** | 2* | **1*** | **1*** | **9** | **2** | **1*** | **1*** | **1*** | **1*** | **1*** | 351 |
| 2 | (Republic of Ireland) Patrick McKenna | 2 | 3 | **1** | 6 | 2 | 1* | 3 | 2 | 4 | 7 | 3 | 5 | 269 |
| 3 | (Russia) Mikhail Goikhberg | 8 | 7 | 3 | 3 | 3 | 2 | 10 | 11 | 2 | 2 | 9 | 11 | 194 |
| 4 | (Brazil) Raphael Abbate | 6 | 11 | 8 | 2 | 7 | 3 | 5 | 8 | 5 | 5 | 8 | 6 | 192 |
| 5 | (United States) Zach Veach | | | 4 | 5 | 4 | 5 | 7 | 6 | 3 | 3 | 2 | 4 | 189 |
| 6 | (Chile) Martin Scuncio | 4 | 12 | 5 | 4 | 5 | 6 | 12 | 5 | 13 | 9 | | | 119 |
| 7 | (Chile) Javier Barrales | | | 7 | 8 | 8 | 7 | 8 | 7 | 6 | 14 | 11 | 7 | 112 |
| 8 | (United States) Matthew Powers | 12 | 9 | | | | | 4 | 4 | 14 | 6 | 5 | 10 | 97 |
| 9 | (Colombia) Martin Sala | 5 | 13 | | | 6 | 4 | 6 | 9 | DNS | DNS | | | 79 |
| 10 | (Aruba) Terrick Mansur | 3 | 4 | 6 | 10 | | | | | | | | | 57 |
| 11 | (United Kingdom) Josh Fielding | 7 | 2 | 11 | | | | | | | | | | 40 |
| 12 | (Canada) Anthony Furfari | 9 | 6 | | | | | | | | | | | 27 |
| 13 | (United States) Benjamin Searcy | 13 | 5 | | | | | | | | | | | 18 |
| | (United States) Ardie Greenamyer^{1} | 10 | 8 | | | | | | | | | | | 0 |
Unregistered drivers ineligible for points
| | (Estonia) Tõnis Kasemets | | | | | | | 1* | 3 | 7 | 4 | | | 0 |
| | (Puerto Rico) Félix Serrallés | | | | | | | | | 9 | 8 | 4 | 2 | 0 |
| | (Australia) Luke Ellery | | | | | | | | | | | 10 | 3 | 0 |
| | (China) David Cheng | | | | | | | | | 8 | 10 | | | 0 |
| | (United States) Scott Anderson | | | | | | | | | 10 | 13 | | | 0 |
National Class
| 1 | (United States) Ardie Greenamyer | | | 9 | 7 | 9 | 8 | 9 | 10 | 12 | 12 | 6 | 9 | 208 |
| 2 | (United States) J. R. Smart | 11 | 10 | | 9 | | | 11 | DNS | 11 | 11 | 7 | 8 | 164 |
| 3 | (United States) Joe Tovo | | | 10 | | | | | | | | | | 1 |
| 4 | (United States) Brian Belardi | | | | 11 | | | | | | | | | 1 |
| Pos | Driver | STP | | ORP | IOW | NJ | | ACC | | ROA | | ATL | | Points |

| Color | Result |
|---|---|
| Gold | Winner |
| Silver | 2nd place |
| Bronze | 3rd place |
| Green | 4th & 5th place |
| Light Blue | 6th–10th place |
| Dark Blue | Finished (Outside Top 10) |
| Purple | Did not finish |
| Red | Did not qualify (DNQ) |
| Brown | Withdrawn (Wth) |
| Black | Disqualified (DSQ) |
| White | Did not start (DNS) |
| Blank | Did not participate (DNP) |
| Blank | Not competing |

**In-line notation**
| **Bold** | Pole position (1 point) |
| Italics | Ran fastest race lap (1 point) |
| * | Led most race laps (1 point) |

^{1}Ardie Greenamyer switched from Championship to National class at ORP and was subsequently not shown in Championship class standings published by the league.

=== Teams' ===
| Pos | Team | STP | | ORP | IOW | NJ | | ACC | | ROA | | ATL | | Points |
|---|---|---|---|---|---|---|---|---|---|---|---|---|---|---|
| 1 | (United States) Andretti Autosport | 1 | 1 | 2 | 1 | 1 | 5 | 2 | 1 | 1 | 1 | 1 | 1 | 358 |
| 1 | (United States) Andretti Autosport | | | 4 | 5 | 4 | 9 | 7 | 6 | 3 | 3 | 2 | 4 | 358 |
| 2 | (United States) JDC MotorSports | 5 | 7 | 3 | 2 | 3 | 2 | 5 | 8 | 2 | 2 | 8 | 3 | 245 |
| 2 | (United States) JDC MotorSports | 6 | 11 | 8 | 3 | 6 | 3 | 6 | 9 | 5 | 5 | 9 | 6 | 245 |
| 3 | (United States) Cape Motorsports | 2 | 2 | 1 | 6 | 2 | 1 | 3 | 2 | 4 | 7 | 3 | 5 | 235 |
| 3 | (United States) Cape Motorsports | 7 | 3 | 11 | | | | | | | | 11 | 7 | 235 |
| 4 | (United States) Liberty Motorsports | 3 | 4 | 6 | 10 | | | 4 | 4 | 10 | 6 | 4 | 2 | 120 |
| 4 | (United States) Liberty Motorsports | 12 | 9 | | 11 | | | | | 14 | 8 | 5 | 10 | 120 |
| 5 | (United States) Pabst Racing Services | 4 | 12 | | 9 | | | 1 | 3 | 7 | 4 | 7 | 8 | 81 |
| 5 | (United States) Pabst Racing Services | | | | | | | 11 | | 11 | 11 | | | 81 |
| 6 | Fuerza Chile Motorsports | | | 5 | 4 | 5 | 6 | 8 | 5 | 6 | 9 | | | 66 |
| 6 | Fuerza Chile Motorsports | | | 7 | 8 | 8 | 7 | 12 | 7 | 13 | 14 | | | 66 |
| 7 | (United States) AcceleRace Motorsports | 10 | 8 | | 7 | 9 | 8 | 9 | 10 | 12 | 12 | 6 | 9 | 39 |
| 8 | (Canada) AIM Autosport | 9 | 6 | | | | | | | | | | | 14 |
| Pos | Team | STP | | ORP | IOW | NJ | | ACC | | ROA | | ATL | | Points |
