= XEUBJ-AM =

Radio station of the Universidad Autónoma Benito Juárez de Oaxaca

- Oaxaca City, Oaxaca; Mexico
- Frequencies: 1400 AM; 91.5 FM (not authorized)
- Branding: Radio Universidad de Oaxaca

Programming
- Format: University radio

Ownership
- Owner: Universidad Autónoma Benito Juárez de Oaxaca

History
- First air date: October 1964; 2000 (most recent permit); April 28, 2016 (pirate FM)
- Call sign meaning: "Universidad Autónoma Benito Juárez de Oaxaca"

Technical information
- Power: 1 kW
- Transmitter coordinates: 17°03′00″N 96°42′38″W

Links
- Webcast: Listen live
- Website: uabjo.mx

XEUBJ-AM is a Mexican university radio station owned by the Benito Juárez Autonomous University of Oaxaca in Oaxaca City, Oaxaca, Mexico.

== History ==
Radio Universidad came on air in October 1964. The station's most recent permit, awarded for a five-year term in 2000, expired in 2005 and is listed by the Federal Telecommunications Institute as not having been renewed, as an attempt to renew the permit was not made until 2006.

In 2006 and 2007, Radio Universidad was among the primary stations of the Popular Assembly of the Peoples of Oaxaca (APPO).

Since 2013, the station has been subject to a lack of attention by the university. It spent nearly a year without a station director in 2013 and 2014 and was subject to strikes in 2011 and in 2013 that caused the station to shut down. In July 2015, a protest by students of the UABJO's College of Sciences forced the closure of Radio Universidad for a day, which may result in a sanction.

On April 28, 2016, Radio Universidad began transmissions on 91.5 FM. However, no authorization is on file with the federal government, in the form of an AM-FM migration or, given the expired permit, a new public use concession.
