= 2022 Mahindra ROXOR 200 =

NASCAR Xfinity Series race

Race details
- Race 11 of 33 in the 2022 NASCAR Xfinity Series
- Date: May 7, 2022
- Official name: 35th Annual Mahindra ROXOR 200
- Location: Darlington, South Carolina, Darlington Raceway
- Course: Permanent racing facility
- Course length: 1.366 miles (2.198 km)
- Distance: 147 laps, 200.802 mi (323.159 km)
- Scheduled distance: 147 laps, 200.802 mi (323.159 km)
- Average speed: 107.589 mph (173.148 km/h)

Pole position
Driver	Ty Gibbs	Joe Gibbs Racing
- Grid positions set by competition-based formula

Most laps led
Driver	Justin Allgaier	JR Motorsports
- Laps: 76

Winner
No. 7	Justin Allgaier	JR Motorsports

Television in the United States
- Network: Fox Sports 1
- Announcers: Adam Alexander, Joey Logano and Ryan Blaney

Radio in the United States
- Radio: Motor Racing Network

The 2022 Mahindra ROXOR 200 was the 11th stock car race of the 2022 NASCAR Xfinity Series season, and the 35th iteration of the event. The race was held on May 7, 2022, in Darlington, South Carolina at Darlington Raceway, a 1.366-mile (2.198 km) egg-shaped oval. It was contested over 147 laps. At race's end, Justin Allgaier of JR Motorsports would take the win, after taking the lead on the final restart. He would also lead the most laps. This was Allgaier's 17th career Xfinity Series win, and his first of the season. To fill out the podium, Noah Gragson of JR Motorsports and Riley Herbst of Stewart-Haas Racing would finish 2nd and 3rd, respectively.

== Report ==
=== Background ===
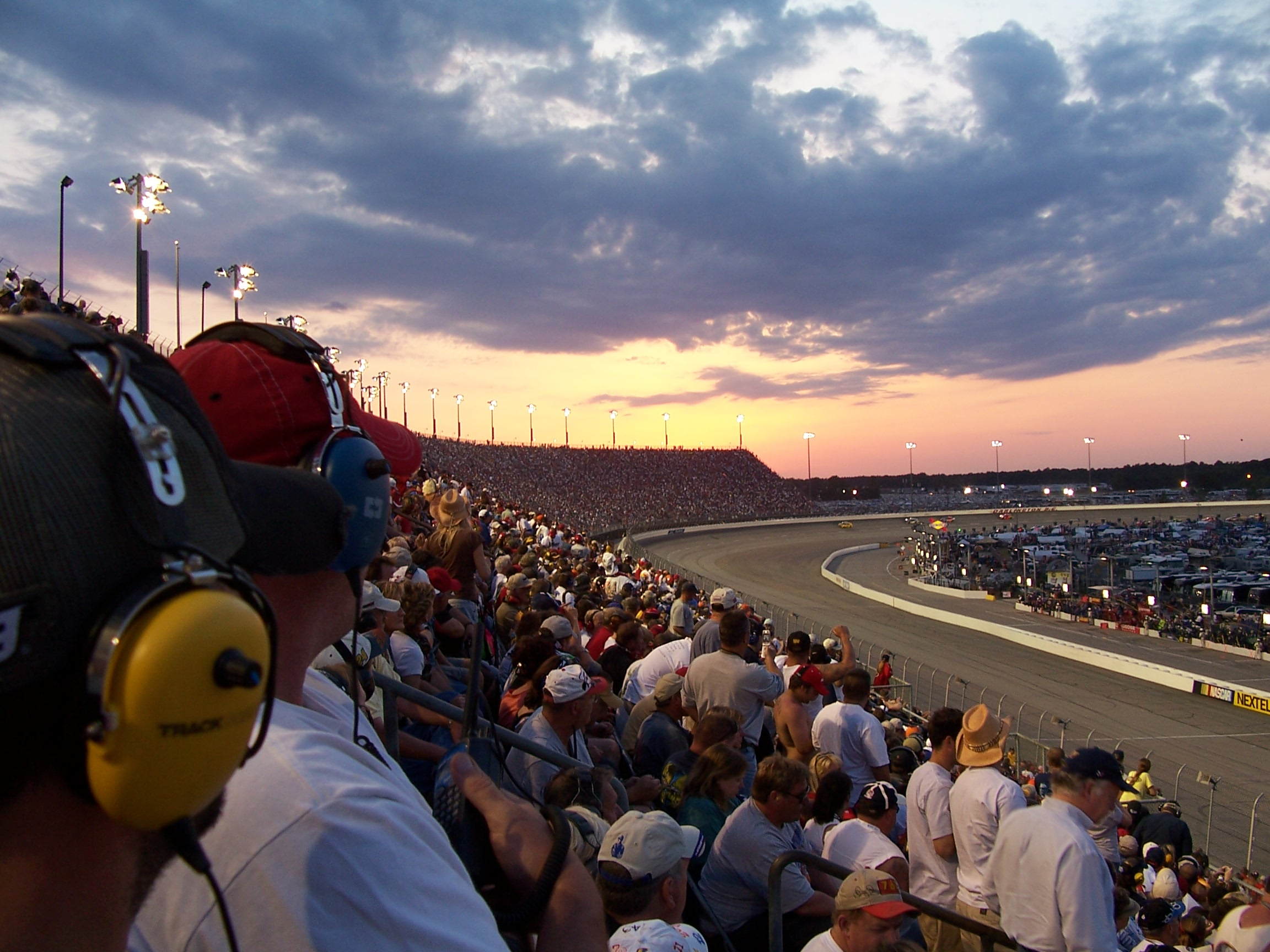
Darlington Raceway where the race will be held.

Darlington Raceway is a race track built for NASCAR racing located near Darlington, South Carolina. It is nicknamed "The Lady in Black" and "The Track Too Tough to Tame" by many NASCAR fans and drivers and advertised as "A NASCAR Tradition." It is of a unique, somewhat egg-shaped design, an oval with the ends of very different configurations, a condition which supposedly arose from the proximity of one end of the track to a minnow pond the owner refused to relocate. This situation makes it very challenging for the crews to set up their cars' handling in a way that is effective at both ends.

First held in 1982, the spring Darlington race ran from 1984 to 2014 before returning to the Xfinity Series schedule in 2020. On December 11, Darlington Raceway announced its highly popular NASCAR Throwback weekend would move to the new May 7–9 weekend, effectively making a lineal swap of the two race meetings at the track.

=== Entry list ===
- (R) denotes rookie driver.
- (i) denotes driver who are ineligible for series driver points.

#	Driver	Team	Manufacturer	Sponsor or Throwback
1	Sam Mayer	JR Motorsports	Chevrolet	AcceleratePros.com – Rick Mast's 1991 Skoal Cup paint scheme.
02	Brett Moffitt	Our Motorsports	Chevrolet	Half Off Wholesale – Mark Martin's 1982 Jolly Rancher Cup paint scheme.
2	Sheldon Creed (R)	Richard Childress Racing	Chevrolet	Whelen
4	Bayley Currey	JD Motorsports	Chevrolet	Habana Brisa
5	Matt Mills	B. J. McLeod Motorsports	Chevrolet	J. F. Electric
6	Ryan Vargas	JD Motorsports	Chevrolet	Monarch Roofing – Jeff Gordon's 1999 No. 24 Pepsi paint scheme.
07	Joe Graf Jr.	SS-Green Light Racing	Ford	Bucked Up Buck Shot Energy Drink – Buckshot Jones' 2001 No. 00 BGN and No. 44 Cup Georgia-Pacific paint scheme.
7	Justin Allgaier	JR Motorsports	Chevrolet	Hellmann's – Dale Earnhardt's 1984 Daytona 500 No. 3 Wrangler Cup paint scheme.
08	David Starr	SS-Green Light Racing	Ford	TicketSmarter – Bobby Dotter's 1995 Hyde Tools paint scheme.
8	Josh Berry	JR Motorsports	Chevrolet	Tire Pros – Dale Earnhardt Jr.'s 2002 Action Performance "Gossamer" paint scheme.
9	Noah Gragson	JR Motorsports	Chevrolet	Bass Pro Shops/Black Rifle Coffee Company
10	Landon Cassill	Kaulig Racing	Chevrolet	Voyager
11	Daniel Hemric	Kaulig Racing	Chevrolet	Cirkul
13	Timmy Hill (i)	MBM Motorsports	Toyota	Coble Enterprises
16	A. J. Allmendinger	Kaulig Racing	Chevrolet	Action Industries
18	Ryan Truex	Joe Gibbs Racing	Toyota	Toyota Racing
19	Brandon Jones	Joe Gibbs Racing	Toyota	Turtle Wax/Menards – Paul Menard's 2011 Cup paint scheme.
21	Austin Hill (R)	Richard Childress Racing	Chevrolet	Bennett Transportation & Logistics
23	Anthony Alfredo	Our Motorsports	Chevrolet	Dude Wipes – Tom Hubert's 2002 No. 23 Hills Bros. Coffee Cup paint scheme.
26	John Hunter Nemechek (i)	Sam Hunt Racing	Toyota	Stillhouse Spirits
27	Jeb Burton	Our Motorsports	Chevrolet	Solid Rock Carriers – Ward Burton's 1992 Gwaltney paint scheme.
31	Myatt Snider	Jordan Anderson Racing	Chevrolet	Capital City Towing – Ken Schrader's 1987 Red Baron Pizza paint scheme.
34	Kyle Weatherman	Jesse Iwuji Motorsports	Chevrolet	LS Tractors
35	Patrick Emerling	Emerling-Gase Motorsports	Chevrolet	B. R. Dewitt Inc. – Tribute to Modified Tour legend Richie Evans.
36	Alex Labbé	DGM Racing	Chevrolet	Ace Wrecker Service – Tribute to Michael McCrary Sr.'s 1976 Marion Edwards Memorial car.
38	Kyle Sieg	RSS Racing	Ford	H&W Electrical
39	Ryan Sieg	RSS Racing	Ford	CMR Construction & Roofing/A-GAME
44	Josh Bilicki	Alpha Prime Racing	Chevrolet	Insurance King – Bill Elliott's 2006 No. 00 Burger King Cup paint scheme.
45	Tommy Joe Martins	Alpha Prime Racing	Chevrolet	Capital City Hauling
47	Brennan Poole	Mike Harmon Racing	Chevrolet	Inspire.Real.Change.
48	Tyler Reddick (i)	Big Machine Racing	Chevrolet	Big Machine Vodka Spiked Coolers – Bobby Allison's 1972 No. 12 Coca-Cola Cup paint scheme.
51	Jeremy Clements	Jeremy Clements Racing	Chevrolet	Spartan Waste/Fox Sports Spartanburg 1400 – Dale Earnhardt/Bud Moore Engineering's 1982 No. 15 Wrangler Cup paint scheme.
54	Ty Gibbs	Joe Gibbs Racing	Toyota	Interstate Batteries – Bobby Labonte's 2002 No. 18 Cup paint scheme.
66	J. J. Yeley	MBM Motorsports	Ford	WorkPro – Bobby Hamilton's 1993 No. 68 Country Time Cup paint scheme.
68	Brandon Brown	Brandonbilt Motorsports	Chevrolet	Brandonbilt Foundations – Tribute to Brown's late model career.
78	Josh Williams	B. J. McLeod Motorsports	Chevrolet	Alloy Employment Services/Coolray – Tribute to B. J. McLeod's 2004 Orlando Speed World Super Late Model car.
88	Chase Elliott (i)	JR Motorsports	Chevrolet	HendrickCars.com – Kyle Larson's 2021 No. 5 HendrickCars.com paint scheme.
91	Mason Massey	DGM Racing	Chevrolet	Marty Massey Towing & Recovery/Anderson Power Services – Tribute to Marty Massey's 2003 dirt late model car.
98	Riley Herbst	Stewart-Haas Racing	Ford	Monster Energy
99	Stefan Parsons	B. J. McLeod Motorsports	Chevrolet	Circle B Diecast/SOKAL Digital – Phil Parsons' 1988 No. 55 Crown/Skoal Cup paint scheme.
Official entry list

== Practice ==
The only 30-minute practice session was held on Friday, May 6, at 5:00 PM EST. Noah Gragson of JR Motorsports would set the fastest time in the session, with a time of 29.828 seconds and a speed of 164.865 mph (265.324 km/h).

Pos	#	Driver	Team	Make	Time	Speed
1	9	Noah Gragson	JR Motorsports	Chevrolet	29.828	164.865
2	26	John Hunter Nemechek (i)	Sam Hunt Racing	Toyota	29.841	164.793
3	54	Ty Gibbs	Joe Gibbs Racing	Toyota	29.910	164.413
Full practice results

== Qualifying ==
Qualifying was scheduled to be held on Friday, May 6, at 5:30 PM EST, but was canceled due to inclement weather. The starting lineup would be determined by a performance-based metric system. As a result, Ty Gibbs of Joe Gibbs Racing won the pole. Chase Elliott and Brennan Poole would fail to qualify.

Pos.	#	Driver	Team	Make	Time	Speed
1	54	Ty Gibbs	Joe Gibbs Racing	Toyota	—	—
2	8	Josh Berry	JR Motorsports	Chevrolet	—	—
3	7	Justin Allgaier	JR Motorsports	Chevrolet	—	—
4	9	Noah Gragson	JR Motorsports	Chevrolet	—	—
5	16	A. J. Allmendinger	Kaulig Racing	Chevrolet	—	—
6	19	Brandon Jones	Joe Gibbs Racing	Toyota	—	—
7	1	Sam Mayer	JR Motorsports	Chevrolet	—	—
8	98	Riley Herbst	Stewart-Haas Racing	Ford	—	—
9	39	Ryan Sieg	RSS Racing	Ford	—	—
10	2	Sheldon Creed (R)	Richard Childress Racing	Chevrolet	—	—
11	11	Daniel Hemric	Kaulig Racing	Chevrolet	—	—
12	21	Austin Hill (R)	Richard Childress Racing	Chevrolet	—	—
13	10	Landon Cassill	Kaulig Racing	Chevrolet	—	—
14	23	Anthony Alfredo	Our Motorsports	Chevrolet	—	—
15	27	Jeb Burton	Our Motorsports	Chevrolet	—	—
16	02	Brett Moffitt	Our Motorsports	Chevrolet	—	—
17	68	Brandon Brown	Brandonbilt Motorsports	Chevrolet	—	—
18	36	Alex Labbé	DGM Racing	Chevrolet	—	—
19	31	Myatt Snider	Jordan Anderson Racing	Chevrolet	—	—
20	66	J. J. Yeley	MBM Motorsports	Ford	—	—
21	07	Joe Graf Jr.	SS-Green Light Racing	Ford	—	—
22	51	Jeremy Clements	Jeremy Clements Racing	Chevrolet	—	—
23	26	John Hunter Nemechek (i)	Sam Hunt Racing	Toyota	—	—
24	6	Ryan Vargas	JD Motorsports	Chevrolet	—	—
25	78	Josh Williams	B. J. McLeod Motorsports	Chevrolet	—	—
26	38	Kyle Sieg	RSS Racing	Ford	—	—
27	08	David Starr	SS-Green Light Racing	Ford	—	—
28	18	Ryan Truex	Joe Gibbs Racing	Toyota	—	—
29	35	Patrick Emerling	Emerling-Gase Motorsports	Chevrolet	—	—
30	4	Bayley Currey	JD Motorsports	Chevrolet	—	—
31	34	Kyle Weatherman	Jesse Iwuji Motorsports	Chevrolet	—	—
32	91	Mason Massey	DGM Racing	Chevrolet	—	—
33	5	Matt Mills	B. J. McLeod Motorsports	Chevrolet	—	—
Qualified by owner's points
34	48	Tyler Reddick (i)	Big Machine Racing	Chevrolet	—	—
35	99	Stefan Parsons	B. J. McLeod Motorsports	Chevrolet	—	—
36	45	Tommy Joe Martins	Alpha Prime Racing	Chevrolet	—	—
37	44	Josh Bilicki	Alpha Prime Racing	Chevrolet	—	—
38	13	Timmy Hill (i)	MBM Motorsports	Toyota	—	—
Failed to qualify
39	88	Chase Elliott (i)	JR Motorsports	Chevrolet	—	—
40	47	Brennan Poole	Mike Harmon Racing	Chevrolet	—	—
Official starting lineup

== Race results ==
Stage One Laps: 45

Pos.	#	Driver	Team	Make	Pts
1	9	Noah Gragson	JR Motorsports	Chevrolet	10
2	54	Ty Gibbs	Joe Gibbs Racing	Toyota	9
3	8	Josh Berry	JR Motorsports	Chevrolet	8
4	7	Justin Allgaier	JR Motorsports	Chevrolet	7
5	98	Riley Herbst	Stewart-Haas Racing	Ford	6
6	16	A. J. Allmendinger	Kaulig Racing	Chevrolet	5
7	39	Ryan Sieg	RSS Racing	Ford	4
8	10	Landon Cassill	Kaulig Racing	Chevrolet	3
9	18	Ryan Truex	Joe Gibbs Racing	Toyota	2
10	26	John Hunter Nemechek (i)	Sam Hunt Racing	Toyota	0

Stage Two Laps: 45

Pos.	#	Driver	Team	Make	Pts
1	9	Noah Gragson	JR Motorsports	Chevrolet	10
2	54	Ty Gibbs	Joe Gibbs Racing	Toyota	9
3	7	Justin Allgaier	JR Motorsports	Chevrolet	8
4	26	John Hunter Nemechek (i)	Sam Hunt Racing	Toyota	0
5	48	Tyler Reddick (i)	Big Machine Racing	Chevrolet	0
6	8	Josh Berry	JR Motorsports	Chevrolet	5
7	1	Sam Mayer	JR Motorsports	Chevrolet	4
8	16	A. J. Allmendinger	Kaulig Racing	Chevrolet	3
9	18	Ryan Truex	Joe Gibbs Racing	Toyota	2
10	98	Riley Herbst	Stewart-Haas Racing	Ford	1

Stage Three Laps: 57

Fin.	St	#	Driver	Team	Make	Laps	Led	Status	Points
1	3	7	Justin Allgaier	JR Motorsports	Chevrolet	147	76	Running	55
2	4	9	Noah Gragson	JR Motorsports	Chevrolet	147	45	Running	55
3	8	98	Riley Herbst	Stewart-Haas Racing	Ford	147	0	Running	41
4	23	26	John Hunter Nemechek (i)	Sam Hunt Racing	Toyota	147	0	Running	0
5	7	1	Sam Mayer	JR Motorsports	Chevrolet	147	0	Running	36
6	13	10	Landon Cassill	Kaulig Racing	Chevrolet	147	0	Running	34
7	6	19	Brandon Jones	Joe Gibbs Racing	Toyota	147	0	Running	30
8	5	16	A. J. Allmendinger	Kaulig Racing	Chevrolet	147	5	Running	37
9	12	21	Austin Hill (R)	Richard Childress Racing	Chevrolet	147	0	Running	28
10	11	11	Daniel Hemric	Kaulig Racing	Chevrolet	147	0	Running	27
11	9	39	Ryan Sieg	RSS Racing	Ford	147	0	Running	30
12	31	34	Kyle Weatherman	Jesse Iwuji Motorsports	Chevrolet	147	0	Running	25
13	16	02	Brett Moffitt	Our Motorsports	Chevrolet	147	0	Running	24
14	15	27	Jeb Burton	Our Motorsports	Chevrolet	147	0	Running	23
15	14	23	Anthony Alfredo	Our Motorsports	Chevrolet	147	0	Running	22
16	1	54	Ty Gibbs	Joe Gibbs Racing	Toyota	147	18	Running	39
17	36	45	Tommy Joe Martins	Alpha Prime Racing	Chevrolet	147	0	Running	20
18	2	8	Josh Berry	JR Motorsports	Chevrolet	147	0	Running	32
19	18	36	Alex Labbé	DGM Racing	Chevrolet	147	0	Running	18
20	35	99	Stefan Parsons	B. J. McLeod Motorsports	Chevrolet	147	0	Running	17
21	24	6	Ryan Vargas	JD Motorsports	Chevrolet	147	0	Running	16
22	32	91	Mason Massey	DGM Racing	Chevrolet	147	0	Running	15
23	30	4	Bayley Currey	JD Motorsports	Chevrolet	147	0	Running	14
24	29	35	Patrick Emerling	Emerling-Gase Motorsports	Chevrolet	147	0	Running	13
25	20	66	J. J. Yeley	MBM Motorsports	Ford	147	0	Running	12
26	34	48	Tyler Reddick (i)	Big Machine Racing	Chevrolet	147	2	Running	0
27	27	08	David Starr	SS-Green Light Racing	Ford	147	0	Running	10
28	37	44	Josh Bilicki	Alpha Prime Racing	Chevrolet	147	0	Running	9
29	22	51	Jeremy Clements	Jeremy Clements Racing	Chevrolet	147	0	Running	8
30	28	18	Ryan Truex	Joe Gibbs Racing	Toyota	147	0	Running	11
31	33	5	Matt Mills	B. J. McLeod Motorsports	Chevrolet	147	1	Running	6
32	26	38	Kyle Sieg	RSS Racing	Ford	147	0	Running	5
33	38	13	Timmy Hill (i)	MBM Motorsports	Toyota	147	0	Running	4
34	25	78	Josh Williams	B. J. McLeod Motorsports	Chevrolet	144	0	Running	3
35	17	68	Brandon Brown	Brandonbilt Motorsports	Chevrolet	142	0	Running	2
36	21	07	Joe Graf Jr.	SS-Green Light Racing	Ford	135	0	Accident	1
37	19	31	Myatt Snider	Jordan Anderson Racing	Chevrolet	73	0	Accident	1
38	10	2	Sheldon Creed (R)	Richard Childress Racing	Chevrolet	16	0	Engine	1
Official race results

== Standings after the race ==
Drivers' Championship standings

Pos	Driver	Points
1	A. J. Allmendinger	464
2	Noah Gragson	439 (-25)
3	Ty Gibbs	423 (-41)
4	Justin Allgaier	372 (-92)
5	Josh Berry	371 (-93)
6	Brandon Jones	347 (-117)
7	Sam Mayer	333 (-131)
8	Riley Herbst	318 (-146)
9	Ryan Sieg	317 (-147)
10	Austin Hill	302 (-162)
11	Landon Cassill	299 (-165)
12	Daniel Hemric	286 (-178)
Official driver's standings

- Note: Only the first 12 positions are included for the driver standings.

Previous race: 2022 A-GAME 200	NASCAR Xfinity Series; 2022 season	Next race: 2022 SRS Distribution 250
