= WMFA =

Radio station in Raeford, North Carolina

- Raeford, North Carolina; United States
- Frequency: 1400 kHz

Programming
- Format: Gospel

Ownership
- Owner: W & V Broadcasting

History
- Former call signs: WHIL
- Call sign meaning: With Music For All.

Technical information
- Licensing authority: FCC
- Class: C
- Power: 1000 Watts
- Transmitter coordinates: 34°58′43″N 79°12′32″W

Links
- Public license information: Public file; LMS

WMFA (1400 AM) is a radio station broadcasting a gospel format, licensed to Raeford, North Carolina, United States. The station is currently licensed to W & V Broadcasting, which is 100% owned by William E. Hollingsworth of Raeford, NC and his wife Vera.

== History ==
Rev. James Ross owned WHIL. The station had been off the air for about a year when the Hollingsworths bought it in March 1993 and brought it back June 1 with a black gospel format.

The station started life in 1963 as WSHB (Where Sandhills Begin), owned by a group headed by Al Stanley, general manager of WTSB in Lumberton, NC. The station came to early success under the leadership of Ed Rogers, who had worked for Stanley in Lumberton. The format at the time was middle of the road, and the station was affiliated with what was then called the Tobacco Radio Network. At the time, the transmitter and tower were located across Business 401 from the studio, which still exists.
