= WAJL =

- South Boston, Virginia; United States
- Broadcast area: South Boston, Virginia; Halifax County, Virginia
- Frequency: 1400 kHz
- Branding: The Beacon 1400AM

Programming
- Format: Southern gospel and bluegrass

Ownership
- Owner: Linda Waller Barton

History
- First air date: June 29, 2010
- Call sign meaning: Worship And Joyful Living

Technical information
- Licensing authority: FCC
- Facility ID: 160359
- Class: C
- Power: 1,000 watts
- Transmitter coordinates: 36°42′35.0″N 78°52′28.0″W

Links
- Public license information: Public file; LMS
- Website: thebeacon1400am.com

WAJL is a Southern Gospel and Bluegrass formatted broadcast radio station licensed to South Boston, Virginia, serving South Boston and Halifax County, Virginia. WAJL is owned and operated by Linda Waller Barton.
