= WIDA-FM =

Radio station in Carolina, Puerto Rico

- Carolina, Puerto Rico; Puerto Rico
- Broadcast area: Puerto Rico
- Frequency: 90.5 MHz
- Branding: Vida FM 90.5

Programming
- Format: Contemporary Christian

Ownership
- Owner: Primera Iglesia Bautista de Carolina; (Radio Vida Incorporado)
- Sister stations: WIDA

History
- First air date: 1982; 44 years ago
- Call sign meaning: Vida

Technical information
- Licensing authority: FCC
- Facility ID: 10955
- Class: B
- ERP: 31,000 watts
- HAAT: 853.0 meters (2,798.6 ft)
- Transmitter coordinates: 18°56′48″N 66°53′57″W

Links
- Public license information: Public file; LMS

WIDA-FM (90.5 MHz), branded on-air as Vida FM 90.5, is a radio station broadcasting a contemporary Christian format. Licensed to Carolina, Puerto Rico, it serves the Puerto Rico area. The station is currently owned by Radio Vida Incorporado.

Former logo
