= KIUN =

- Pecos, Texas; United States
- Frequency: 1400 kHz
- Branding: KIUN 1400

Programming
- Format: Country music

Ownership
- Owner: Pampa Broadcasters, Inc.

History
- First air date: October 8, 1935

Technical information
- Licensing authority: FCC
- Facility ID: 52064
- Class: C
- Power: 1,000 watts
- Transmitter coordinates: 31°26′09″N 103°30′14″W

Links
- Public license information: Public file; LMS
- Website: 98xfm.com/kiun/index.shtml

KIUN 1400 AM is a radio station licensed to Pecos, Texas. The station broadcasts a country music format and is owned by Pecos Radio Co., Inc.

== History ==
KIUN was first authorized in 1935. The call sign was randomly assigned from an alphabetical list of available call letters.
