= KEYE-FM =

- Perryton, Texas; United States
- Frequency: 93.7 MHz
- Branding: 93.7 MY FM

Programming
- Format: Adult contemporary
- Affiliations: Westwood One

Ownership
- Owner: Perryton Radio, Inc.
- Sister stations: KEYE

History
- First air date: January 1978

Technical information
- Licensing authority: FCC
- Facility ID: 52329
- Class: C3
- ERP: 8,500 watts
- HAAT: 122.6 meters (402 ft)
- Transmitter coordinates: 36°21′54.1″N 100°46′46.5″W

Links
- Public license information: Public file; LMS
- Webcast: Listen live
- Website: www.keye.net

KEYE-FM (93.7 FM) is an adult contemporary formatted radio station licensed to serve Perryton, Texas. The station is owned by Perryton Radio, Inc.

On January 25, 2011, KEYE-FM was granted a construction permit by the Federal Communications Commission to relocate to 93.7 MHz and a new tower location slightly east of the current tower. KEYE-FM moved to 93.7 FM on March 22, 2012.
