= Rádio Rio de Janeiro =

- Rio de Janeiro; Brazil
- Frequency: 1400 KHz

Programming
- Language: Portuguese

History
- First air date: November 1, 1959

Rádio Rio de Janeiro (1400 kHz) is a radio station in Rio de Janeiro, Brazil. Founded in 1959 as a regular commercial station, it has been dedicated to Kardecist spiritism since 1971, when the station was taken over by FUNTARSO.

== History ==
Rádio Rio de Janeiro started broadcasting November 1, 1959. Its launch ceremony was marked by the presence of singer Marlene. The station broadcast on 1320 KHz in its early years and used the latest equipment available at the time, broadcasting news updated every half hour and contests where listeners could win CR$1 million in prizes.

The current administration has been active since 1971, when Geraldo de Aquino created Fundação Cristã-Espírita Cultural Paulo de Tarso (Funtarso), on February 5 of that year.

Geraldo de Aquino, active in both radio and the promotion of spiritism since the 1930s, started leading a campaign for spiritists to gain their own radio station, which happened on August 2, 1971, with the acquisition of Rádio Rio de Janeiro. With that, the station started dedicating its content to spiritism. Geraldo remained in front of Funtarso until 1984, when he died.

After the conversion into a spiritist station, it started broadcasting an FM relay on 97,3 MHz, which was acquired by José Messias, becoming Melodia FM, an evangelical station, in 1979. Non-spiritist programming was still present, such as a program dedicated to pre-recorded retretas (open air music performances) airing on Saturday nights in 1978.

== Programming ==
The station's content is based on three key axes: news, culture and religion. By 2003, it diversified its programming in order to counter accusations from the general populace of being "that spiritist station". Since 1986, it also has a weekly program in Esperanto: Esperanto, la lingvo de la frateco. This was supplemented by a second program January 2016, La Konsolando which narrows down to the works of Allan Kardec.

The station is sustained by donations and commercial advertising, as long as the latter does not go against the station's code of ethics.
