= KWUF (AM) =

- Pagosa Springs, Colorado; United States
- Frequency: 1400 kHz
- Branding: The Wolf

Programming
- Format: Country music
- Affiliations: Westwood One

Ownership
- Owner: Wolf Creek Broadcasting, LLC

Technical information
- Licensing authority: FCC
- Facility ID: 51287
- Class: C
- Power: 1,000 watts (unlimited)
- Transmitter coordinates: 37°15′24″N 107°1′6″W

Links
- Public license information: Public file; LMS
- Webcast: Listen live
- Website: kwuf.com

KWUF (1400 AM, "The Wolf") is a radio station broadcasting a country music music format. Licensed to Pagosa Springs, Colorado, United States, the station is currently owned by Wolf Creek Broadcasting, LLC and features programming from Westwood One.
