= KTNM =

- Tucumcari, New Mexico; United States
- Frequency: 1400 kHz

Programming
- Format: Country

Ownership
- Owner: Ingalls Holdings, LLC

Technical information
- Licensing authority: FCC
- Facility ID: 54166
- Class: C
- Power: 1,000 watts unlimited
- Transmitter coordinates: 35°10′15″N 103°42′25″W

Links
- Public license information: Public file; LMS
- Webcast: Listen Live

KTNM (1400 AM) is a radio station broadcasting a country music format. Licensed to Tucumcari, New Mexico, United States, the station is currently owned by Ingalls Holdings, LLC.
