= KRUN =

- Ballinger, Texas; United States
- Broadcast area: San Angelo, Texas
- Frequency: 1400 kHz

Programming
- Language: English
- Format: Country
- Affiliations: Citadel Media

Ownership
- Owner: Graham Brothers Communications, LLC

Technical information
- Licensing authority: FCC
- Facility ID: 10025
- Class: C
- Power: 1,000 watts
- Transmitter coordinates: 31°43′31.5″N 99°57′43.3″W

Links
- Public license information: Public file; LMS
- Webcast: Listen Live
- Website: krunam.com

KRUN (1400 AM) is an American radio station licensed to serve the community of Ballinger, the county seat of Runnels County, Texas. The station's broadcast license is held by Graham Brothers Communications, LLC.

The station was assigned the call sign "KRUN" by the Federal Communications Commission (FCC).

== Programming ==
KRUN broadcasts a full service country music format including local news, weather, sports, and the syndicated "Today's Best Country" service from Citadel Media. Local on-air personalities include Toby Virden and Jeri Smith on mornings and Kody Mac on mid-days. In addition to its usual music programming, the station broadcasts tradio programs called Trading Post and Keel Drug's Hotline six days a week.

KRUN broadcasts local sporting events throughout the year, covering athletics from Ballinger, Winters, Miles, Paint Rock, and Bronte.
