= KADR =

- Elkader, Iowa; United States
- Frequency: 1400 kHz

Programming
- Format: Adult Contemporary
- Affiliations: Westwood One

Ownership
- Owner: Design Homes, Inc

History
- First air date: June 14, 1983

Technical information
- Licensing authority: FCC
- Facility ID: 16782
- Class: C
- Power: 1,000 watts
- Transmitter coordinates: 42°50′57″N 91°24′43″W
- Translator: 96.7 K244FQ (Elkader)

Links
- Public license information: Public file; LMS

KADR (1400 AM) is a radio station licensed to Elkader, Iowa. It also serves Prairie du Chien, Wisconsin. The station primarily broadcasts a mix of current hits and oldies, along with local news, weather and sports. KADR is owned by and licensed to Design Homes, Inc. The transmitter and tower are located just southwest of town.
