= WSPG =

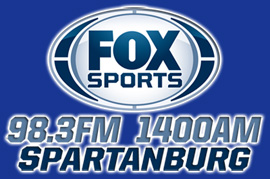
- Spartanburg, South Carolina; United States
- Broadcast area: Spartanburg, South Carolina
- Frequency: 1400 kHz
- Branding: Fox Sports 98.3 FM / 1400 AM Spartanburg

Programming
- Format: Sports
- Affiliations: Fox Sports Radio

Ownership
- Owner: Ryan Delaney; (Fox Sports Spartanburg 2 LLC)

History
- First air date: September 1, 1952
- Former call signs: WKDY (1970s-1991); WYYR (1991–1994); WMMZ (1994–1998); WKDY (1998–2005)

Technical information
- Licensing authority: FCC
- Facility ID: 3026
- Class: C
- Power: 1,000 watts
- Transmitter coordinates: 34°58′26.00″N 81°55′37.00″W
- Translator: 98.3 W252DQ (Spartanburg)

Links
- Public license information: Public file; LMS
- Webcast: Listen Live
- Website: Fox Sports 1400 Spartanburg

WSPG (1400 AM) is a radio station licensed to Spartanburg, South Carolina. It is owned by Ryan Delaney, through licensee Fox Sports Spartanburg 2 LLC. The WSPG studios and transmitter are located at 340 Garner Road in Spartanburg.

== History ==
The station signed on the air September 1, 1952. In the 1970s WKDY was first owned by Capitol Broadcasting Corporation until the late 70s. In 1991 the station was purchased and went back on air as WYYR and was owned by some of the former employees of WORDTony Brooks, Bobby Dean and Todd Brown. It was later purchased by T.C. Lewis and Todd Brown who operated several different formats in the 1990s. During this time, the station was known as Spartanburg's only locally owned community station. Brown sold his interest to Lewis. Lewis sold the station to Matthew Fulmer in 2003 who changed formats to brokered religious programming. The station was sold again in 2006. On January 11, 2010, the station began simulcasting on 97.1 FM until Jan 2014. The Station was sold to FOX Sports Spartanburg 2 On February 16, 2017. 98.3 FM Started Simulcast WSPG AM This was done to help cancel out the AM signal that is reduced significantly at night, as well as provide better audio quality.

On January 11, 2014 WSPG ESPN 1400 was Knock off the air due to Tower collapse

On February 1, 2016 it was announced that WSPG AM 1400 was coming back on the air as Fox Sports 1400 Spartanburg; the station returned to the air with that format on February 10. On February 10, 2016 WSPG 1400 signed back on the air as Fox Sports 1400 Spartanburg

On November 14, 2016, the station received a construction permit from the FCC to build an FM translator at 98.3 MHz.

== Programming ==
ESPN Spartanburg was run by Matt Smith, known as "Smitty" on air. Smith worked at the station before the change to an all sports format. He created and co hosted what is now known as Open Mic Daily, the station's weekday afternoon sports call in show. In May 2012 Smith took over operations of the station from Mark Hauser, who had served as President and General Manager. Hauser is the long time "Voice of the Wofford College Terriers" and one of the co-hosts of Open Mic Daily. Hauser is also well known as the former voice of the Greenville Braves. Ryan Clary is co-host of Open Mic. Clary is the voice of the Spartanburg Vikings and the USC Upstate Spartans. Open Mic is in its 20th year on the radio in Spartanburg. It's Spartanburg's longest running radio show and is currently hosted by Ryan Clary, Joe Skinner, and Brett Loftis.

Bump and Run is Spartanburg County's only locally produced morning show. Bump and Run airs weekday mornings from 7 am-9 am. The current host for the show is Tyler Shugart. Tyler formally hosted a radio show at WBCU in Union and called games for Union County High School. Tyler also is a contributing columnist for the Union Times.

On February 17, 2021 Fox Sports Spartanburg 1400 am & 98.3FM Announce that they will be airing the Atlanta Braves Baseball

Fox Sports Spartanburg is the Flagship station for Spartanburg Viking Football and USC Upstate Basketball and Baseball games. Ryan Clary is the Play by Play Broadcaster for each of these.

It was announced in the Fall of 2024 that the station will be the flagship station for the Hub City Spartanburgers. The station airs locally produced sports shows plus national programming and live sporting events from Fox Sports Radio. Fox Sports 1400 Spartanburg also carries live sports from the following teams:

=== Sports teams ===
- South Carolina Gamecocks Baseball & Football & Basketball
- Duke Blue Devils Basketball
- Spartanburg High School Viking Football
- University of South Carolina Upstate USC-Upstate
- Hub City Spartanburgers Minor League Baseball
