= WIDA (AM) =

Carolina, Puerto Rico; Puerto Rico
- Frequency: 1400 kHz
- Branding: Vida AM 1400

Programming
- Format: Spanish Christian

Ownership
- Owner: Primera Iglesia Bautista de Carolina; (Radio Vida, Incorporado)
- Sister stations: WIDA-FM

History
- First air date: September 25, 1964
- Former call signs: WVOZ (1964-1980)
- Call sign meaning: Vida

Technical information
- Licensing authority: FCC
- Facility ID: 54870
- Class: B
- Power: 1,000 watts unlimited
- Transmitter coordinates: 18°23′49″N 65°56′06″W

Links
- Public license information: Public file; LMS

WIDA (1400 AM, "Vida AM") is a radio station licensed to serve Carolina, Puerto Rico. The station is owned by Primera Iglesia Bautista de Carolina, through licensee Radio Vida Incorporado. It airs a Spanish language Christian radio format.

The station was assigned the WIDA call letters by the Federal Communications Commission on September 1, 1980.

On September 20, 2017, the station's transmitter site was heavily damaged by Hurricane Maria and on October 10, the diesel generator was stolen. The station returned to the air on November 30, 2019, after two years off the air and the transmitter repairs have been completed.

Former logo
