= KEYE (AM) =

- Perryton, Texas; United States
- Frequency: 1400 kHz
- Branding: KEYE AM 1400 FM 96.7

Programming
- Format: Country
- Affiliations: Westwood One, Texas State Network

Ownership
- Owner: Perryton Radio, Inc.
- Sister stations: KEYE-FM

History
- First air date: November 19, 1948

Technical information
- Licensing authority: FCC
- Facility ID: 52328
- Class: C
- Power: 1,000 watts
- Transmitter coordinates: 36°23′20.1″N 100°49′38.5″W
- Translator: 96.7 K244FS (Perryton)

Links
- Public license information: Public file; LMS
- Webcast: Listen live
- Website: www.keye.net

KEYE (1400 AM) is a country music formatted radio station licensed to serve Perryton, Texas. The station is owned by Perryton Radio, Inc.
