= WHLJ (AM) =

- Moultrie, Georgia; United States
- Frequency: 1400 kHz

Programming
- Format: Christian radio

Ownership
- Owner: LaTaurus Productions, Inc.; (LaTaurus Productions Two, LLC)

History
- Former call signs: WHBS (2001–2012)

Technical information
- Licensing authority: FCC
- Facility ID: 129158
- Class: C
- Power: 1,000 watts day 1,000 watts night
- Transmitter coordinates: 31°9′55.70″N 83°45′56.00″W
- Translators: W277DN (103.3 MHz, Moultrie)

Links
- Public license information: Public file; LMS

WHLJ (1400 AM) is a Christian radio station broadcasting a Contemporary Christian music format. Licensed to Moultrie, Georgia, United States, the station is currently owned by LaTaurus Productions, Inc. through its LaTaurus Productions Two, LLC licensee
