= 2018 Indianapolis 500 =

American motor race

102nd Indianapolis 500

Indianapolis Motor Speedway

Indianapolis 500
- Sanctioning body: IndyCar
- Season: 2018 IndyCar Season
- Date: May 27, 2018
- Winner: (Australia) Will Power
- Winning team: Team Penske
- Winning Chief Mechanic: Matt Jonsson
- Time of race: 2:59:42.6365
- Average speed: 166.935 mph (268.656 km/h)
- Pole position: (United States) Ed Carpenter
- Pole speed: 229.618 mph (369.534 km/h)
- Fastest qualifier: (United States) Ed Carpenter
- Rookie of the Year: (Canada) Robert Wickens
- Most laps led: (United States) Ed Carpenter (65)

Pre-race ceremonies
- National anthem: Kelly Clarkson
- "Back Home Again in Indiana": Jim Cornelison
- Starting command: Tony George
- Pace car: Chevrolet Corvette ZR1
- Pace car driver: Victor Oladipo
- Two-seater: Mario Andretti (driver); Nick Cannon (passenger)
- Starter: Paul Blevin
- Honorary starter: Chris Hemsworth

Television in the United States
- Network: ABC (blacked out locally)
- Announcers: Allen Bestwick, Scott Goodyear, Eddie Cheever
- Nielsen ratings: 3.1 (4.9 million viewers)

Chronology
Previous	Next
2017	2019

The 2018 Indianapolis 500 (branded as the 102nd Running of the Indianapolis 500 presented by PennGrade Motor Oil for sponsorship reasons) was an Verizon IndyCar Series event held on Sunday, May 27, 2018, at the Indianapolis Motor Speedway in Speedway, Indiana. It was the premier event of the 2018 IndyCar Series. The race was won by Australian Will Power of Team Penske. Car owner Roger Penske collected his record extending 17th Indianapolis 500 victory. Chevrolet swept nine of the top eleven spots during qualifying, and finished 1st–2nd, Chevy's first Indy victory since 2015, and tenth overall. However, despite entering the month as prohibitive favorites to dominate the race, Chevy managed to place only two other cars in the top ten. The month of May activities formally began on May 12 with the fifth running of the IndyCar Grand Prix on the combined road course. Practice for the Indianapolis 500 began on Tuesday May 15, and time trials were held May 19–20. Carb Day—the traditional final day of practice, as well as the annual Pit Stop Challenge and Indy Lights Freedom 100, were held Friday May 25.

Much of the race was led by Will Power and Ed Carpenter, a race that was considered generally less-competitive that the previous few years, attributed largely to a newly introduced aero kit package. Late in the race, pit strategy and a timely caution flag factored in. On a restart on lap 194, Oriol Servià, Stefan Wilson, and Jack Harvey were all attempting to stretch their fuel to the finish, gambling on a late caution, and a possible surprise victory. However, with four laps to go, both Wilson and Harvey were forced to pit for fuel, as was Servià a lap later. Will Power took the lead and cruised to victory, having led 59 laps. Polesitter Ed Carpenter led 65 laps and finished second, his best-career Indy finish. 2016 winner Alexander Rossi had an outstanding charge from 32nd to 4th, leading one lap during the race. Power became the first driver to win both the IndyCar Grand Prix and the Indianapolis 500, as well as the first driver to sweep both races in the same year. Later in the year, Team Penske also won the NASCAR Brickyard 400, becoming the second team in history to sweep both the Indy 500 and Brickyard 400 in the same year.

Ed Carpenter won the pole position, his third career Indy pole. James Hinchcliffe, the 2016 pole winner, however, shockingly failed to qualify. While making his second attempt, a loose tire pressure sensor caused a vibration, which sent Hinchcliffe back to the pits. Before he could change tires and get back out on the track, the closing gun went off and he was left waiting in line.

== Race background ==
The Indianapolis Motor Speedway is a 2.5-mile oval circuit with four turns banked at 9°.

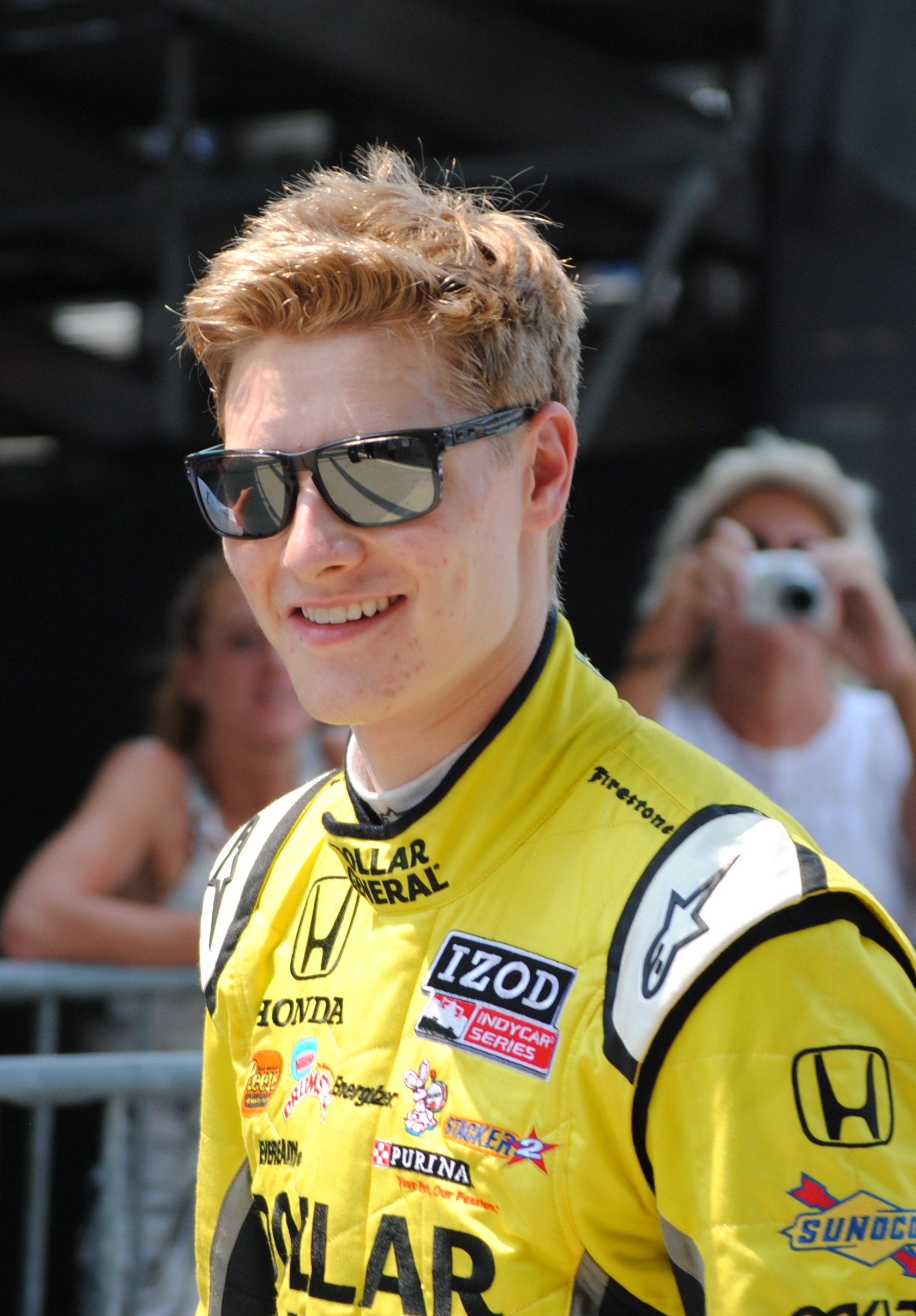
2017 IndyCar champion Josef Newgarden entered the Indy 500 with the championship lead.

=== IR18 car ===
The 2017 race was the third and final year contested with the Chevrolet and Honda aero kits outfitted to the Dallara DW12 chassis. Beginning in 2018, all DW12 Safety Cell chassis were fitted with a universal bodywork kit. Digital renderings for the common bodywork kit, referred to as the 'IR18' car, were released in early May 2017. The car was officially unveiled in late July, and the universal aero kit became known as the UAK18 bodywork. The bodywork is inspired by CART's 1990s and 2000s livery. For the first time since 1996, the cars in the Indy 500 had a roll hoop without an airbox.

=== Rule changes ===
- The practice session on the Monday after the IndyCar Grand Prix was eliminated. The track and garage area were both closed on Sunday May 13 in honor of Mother's Day. The teams used Monday May 14 to convert the cars from road course to oval configuration. The first day of on-track practice for the Indy 500 was scheduled for Tuesday May 15. In order to make up for some of the lost practice time, the start time for practice days was moved up to 11:00. Previously, practice opened daily at 12 noon. The track still closes at 18:00 daily.
- The minimum car weight was increased by 10 lb (4.536 kg) – to 1,590 lb (721.212 kg) for superspeedways due to safety features added with the new universal aero kits.
- Championship points earned during Indy 500 qualifying were revamped. The top nine qualifiers received points. The pole position winner received 9 points, down to 1 point for the ninth qualifier (9-8-7-6-5-4-3-2-1). Previously, all 33 starters had received points on a higher scale. The points earned for the race finishing positions were unchanged.

=== Track improvements ===
- The pit boxes were resurfaced with new concrete. The previous pit boxes had been used since the 1994 reconstruction of pit lane for NASCAR, INDYCAR, SVRA, and SCCA events in both directions.

=== 2018 IndyCar Series ===
The 102nd Indianapolis 500 was the sixth race of the 2018 Verizon IndyCar Series season, and 23rd sanctioned as part of the Indy Racing League/IndyCar Series. There were four different winners in the first five races of the season. For the second year in a row, Sébastien Bourdais won the season opener at St. Petersburg. Once again, Bourdais won in surprising fashion, taking the lead after the leaders collided on a late-race restart. It was also Bourdais' first victory since suffering injuries in a crash during qualifying for the 2017 Indy 500. Josef Newgarden won at Phoenix, Alexander Rossi won at Long Beach, and Newgarden won again at Birmingham. To begin the month of May, Will Power won the IndyCar Grand Prix, his third win in the event.

Offseason changes included Chip Ganassi Racing, which dropped down to two cars only (Scott Dixon and Ed Jones). Team Penske also dropped down from four full-time cars to three. Hélio Castroneves switched to the WeatherTech SportsCar Championship, and raced at Indianapolis only. Two-time Indy 500 winner Juan Pablo Montoya, however, was left out of a ride for the 2018 race.

== Entry list ==
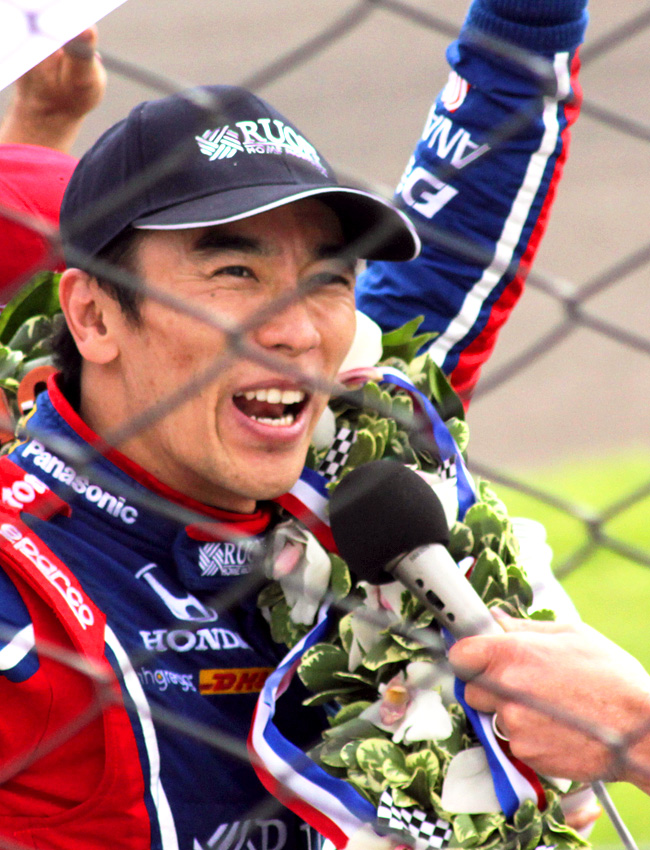
2017 Indy 500 winner Takuma Sato.

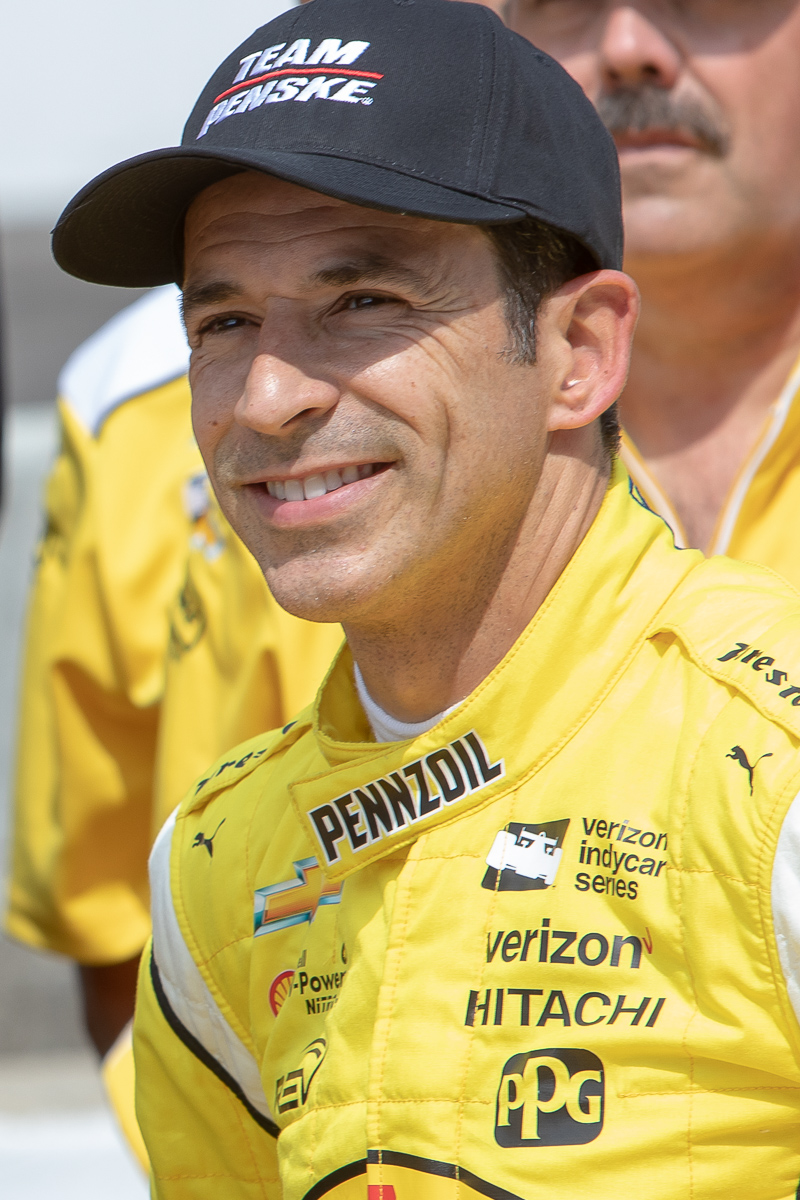
Three-time Indy 500 winner Hélio Castroneves.

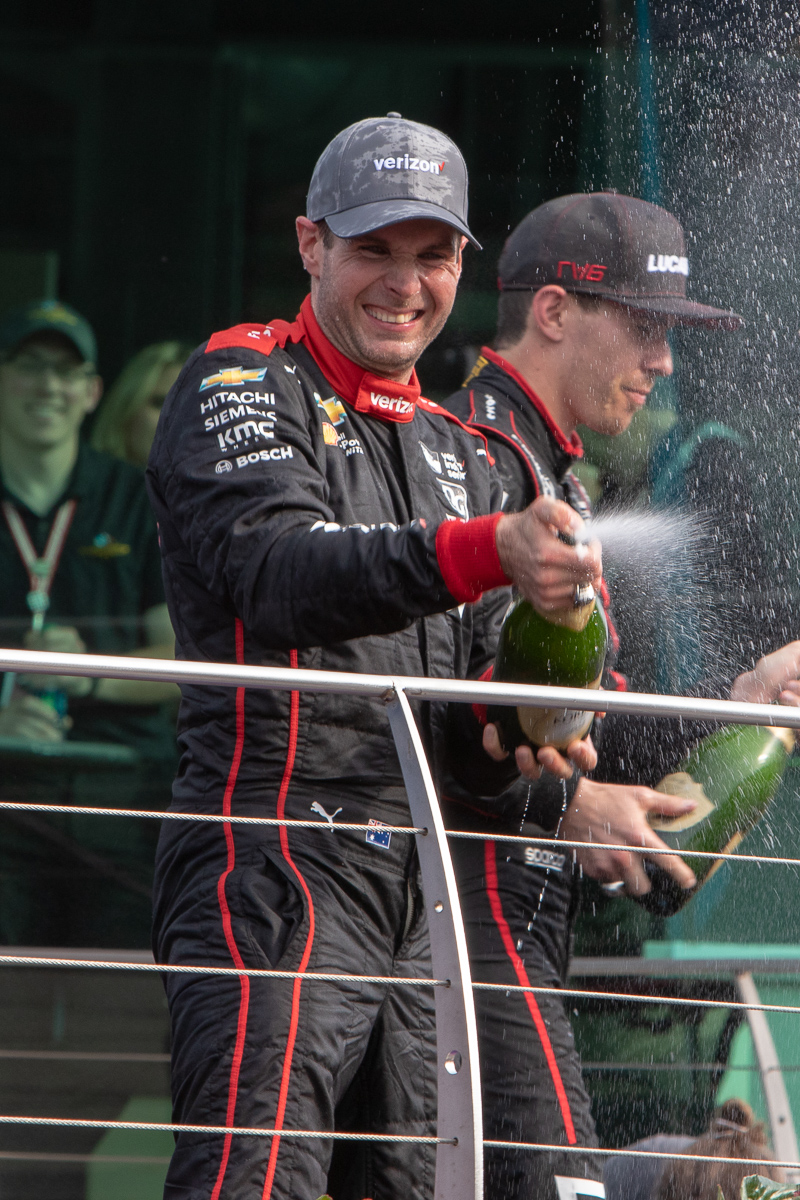
Will Power won the 2018 IndyCar Grand Prix.

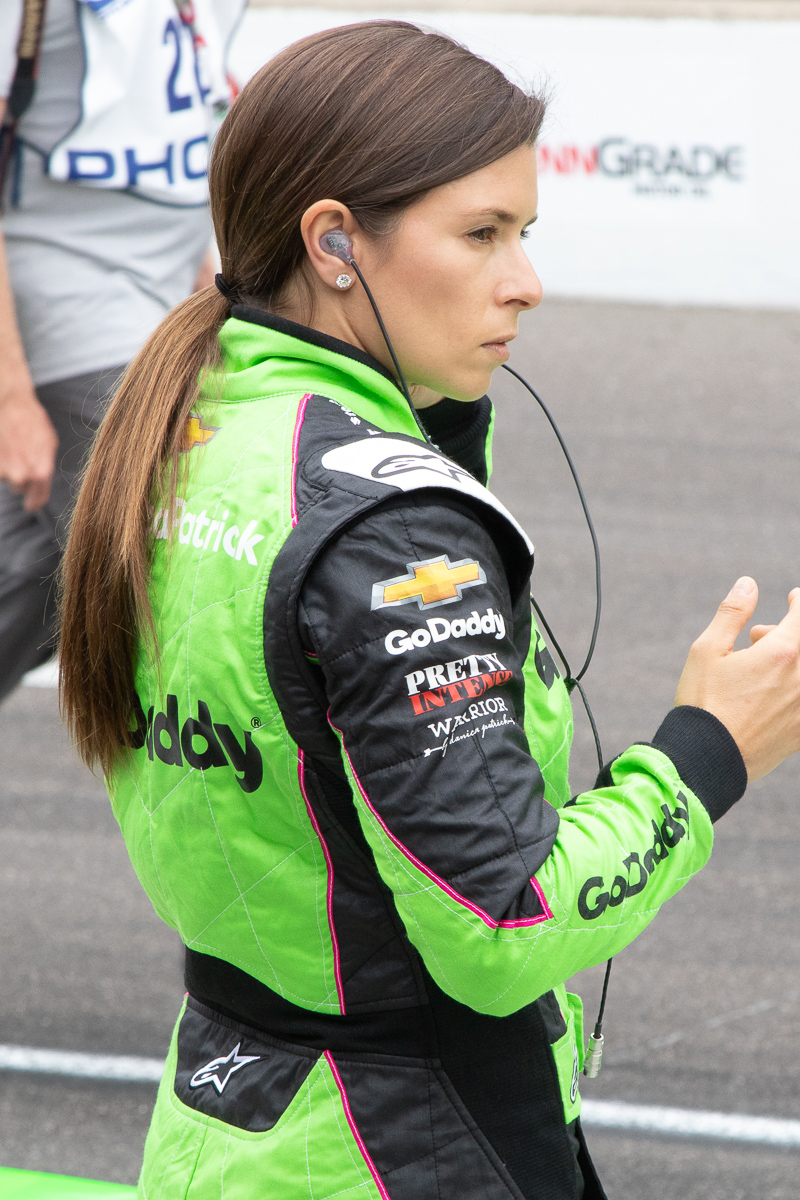
Danica Patrick prepares to practice for the final race of her career, the 2018 Indy 500.

See 2018 IndyCar Series § Teams and drivers for further information.

- The entry list was released on May 1 with 35 cars entered.
- Defending Indianapolis 500 winner Takuma Sato switched from Andretti Autosport to Rahal Letterman Lanigan Racing. Sato previously drove for Rahal in 2012.
- Three-time Indianapolis 500 winner Hélio Castroneves of Team Penske would switch to the IMSA WeatherTech SportsCar Championship for 2018 onward, but would race for Penske at the IndyCar Grand Prix and Indianapolis 500.
- Stefan Wilson would join Andretti Autosport for the Indy 500.
- Danica Patrick would compete in her first Indianapolis 500 since 2011 and her final professional race as a full-time competitor, driving a GoDaddy-sponsored entry for Ed Carpenter Racing. Patrick drove at the Daytona 500 in February, her final start in NASCAR.
- A rumored 36th entry for 1996 winner Buddy Lazier (Lazier Partners Racing) did not materialize.
- Pietro Fittipaldi was initially assigned to the #19 Dale Coyne Racing entry. However, on May 4 he crashed during a qualifying session at the WEC 6 Hours of Spa, and fractured both legs. Fittipaldi was withdrawn from the entry, and replaced by Zachary Claman DeMelo.

No.	Driver	Team	Engine
1	(United States) Josef Newgarden	Team Penske	Chevrolet
3	(Brazil) Hélio Castroneves W	Team Penske	Chevrolet
4	(Brazil) Matheus Leist R	A. J. Foyt Enterprises	Chevrolet
5	(Canada) James Hinchcliffe	Schmidt Peterson Motorsports	Honda
6	(Canada) Robert Wickens R	Schmidt Peterson Motorsports	Honda
7	(United Kingdom) Jay Howard	Schmidt Peterson Motorsports with AFS Racing	Honda
9	(New Zealand) Scott Dixon W	Chip Ganassi Racing	Honda
10	(United Arab Emirates) Ed Jones	Chip Ganassi Racing	Honda
12	(Australia) Will Power	Team Penske	Chevrolet
13	(United States) Danica Patrick	Ed Carpenter Racing	Chevrolet
14	(Brazil) Tony Kanaan W	A. J. Foyt Enterprises	Chevrolet
15	(United States) Graham Rahal	Rahal Letterman Lanigan Racing	Honda
17	(United States) Conor Daly	Dale Coyne Racing dba Thom Burns Racing	Honda
18	(France) Sébastien Bourdais	Dale Coyne Racing with Vasser-Sullivan	Honda
19	(Canada) Zachary Claman DeMelo R	Dale Coyne Racing	Honda
20	(United States) Ed Carpenter	Ed Carpenter Racing	Chevrolet
21	(United States) Spencer Pigot	Ed Carpenter Racing	Chevrolet
22	(France) Simon Pagenaud	Team Penske	Chevrolet
23	(United States) Charlie Kimball	Carlin	Chevrolet
24	(United States) Sage Karam	Dreyer & Reinbold Racing	Chevrolet
25	(United Kingdom) Stefan Wilson	Andretti Autosport	Honda
26	(United States) Zach Veach	Andretti Autosport	Honda
27	(United States) Alexander Rossi W	Andretti Autosport	Honda
28	(United States) Ryan Hunter-Reay W	Andretti Autosport	Honda
29	(Colombia) Carlos Muñoz	Andretti Autosport	Honda
30	(Japan) Takuma Sato W	Rahal Letterman Lanigan Racing	Honda
32	(United States) Kyle Kaiser R	Juncos Racing	Chevrolet
33	(Australia) James Davison	A. J. Foyt Enterprises with Byrd-Hollinger-Belardi	Chevrolet
59	(United Kingdom) Max Chilton	Carlin	Chevrolet
60	(United Kingdom) Jack Harvey	Meyer Shank Racing with Schmidt Peterson	Honda
63	(United Kingdom) Pippa Mann	Dale Coyne Racing	Honda
64	(Spain) Oriol Servià	Scuderia Corsa with RLL	Honda
66	(United States) J. R. Hildebrand	Dreyer & Reinbold Racing	Chevrolet
88	(Colombia) Gabby Chaves	Harding Racing	Chevrolet
98	(United States) Marco Andretti	Andretti Herta Autosport with Curb-Agajanian	Honda
OFFICIAL REPORT

- W Former Indianapolis 500 winner
- R Indianapolis 500 Rookie

== Schedule ==
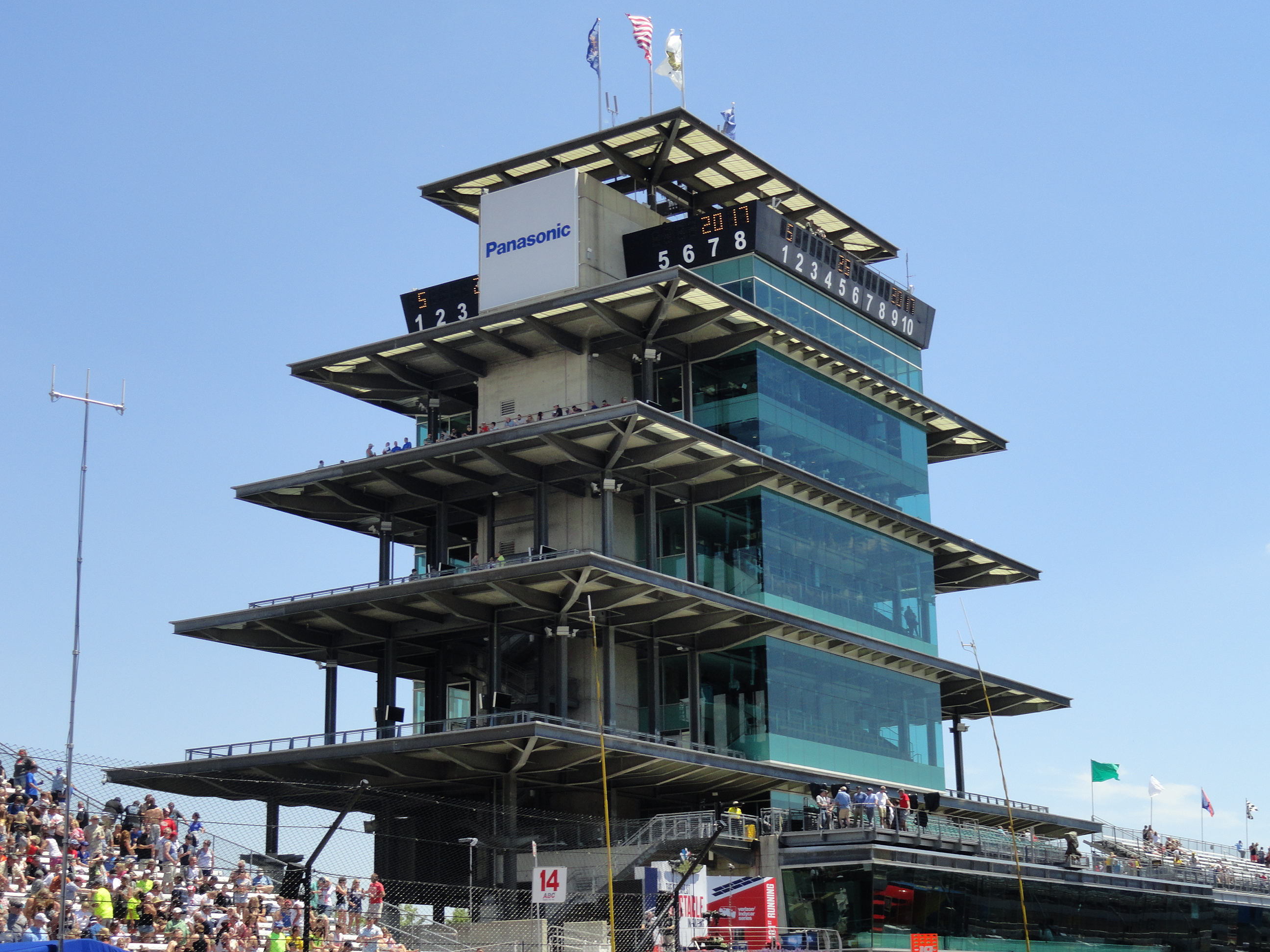
The Pagoda, the control tower which houses officials, broadcasting, and hospitality suites, is an icon at the Indianapolis Motor Speedway.

Four days of testing were scheduled at the Indianapolis Motor Speedway prior to the official opening of the track. On March 23, manufacturer testing was conducted on the road course for Honda. Testing on the oval was scheduled for March 27–29, but was postponed due to inclement weather in the forecast. A full-field, league-sponsored open test was held on the oval April 30, followed by the Rookie Orientation Program and Refresher tests on May 1. On May 2, track activity continued with a private manufacturers test involving both Honda and Chevrolet.

Race schedules — April/May 2018
Sun	Mon	Tue	Wed	Thu	Fri	Sat
29	30; Open Test	1 ROP	2 Manufacturer; Test	3	4	5 Mini-Marathon
6	7	8	9	10; Road to Indy; Practice	11; Grand Prix; Qualifying	12; IndyCar; Grand Prix
13; Mother's; Day	14; Car conversion day	15; ROP; Practice	16; Practice	17; Practice	18; Practice; Fast Friday	19; Time Trials
20; Time Trials	21; Practice	22	23	24; Indy Lights; Qualifying	25; Carb Day; Freedom 100	26; Legends Day; Parade
27; Indianapolis; 500	28; Memorial; Day	29	30	31		

Color	Notes
Green	Practice
Dark Blue	Time trials
Silver	Race day
Red	Rained out*
Blank	No track activity

* Includes days where track
activity was significantly limited due to rain

- Sources: 2018 Indianapolis 500 Event Schedule

== Testing and rookie orientation ==
=== Testing — July 2017 ===
On July 25, 2017, the first official test for the universal bodywork kit was conducted at the Indianapolis Motor Speedway oval. Two teams, one each representing Chevrolet and Honda, attended. Team Penske with driver Juan Pablo Montoya tested for Chevy, and Schmidt Peterson Motorsports with driver Oriol Servià tested for Honda. The tests were considered successful, and no incidents were reported.

Private testing — Participants
Driver	Team	Engine	Speed
(Spain) Oriol Servià	Schmidt Peterson Motorsports	Honda	219 mph
(Colombia) Juan Pablo Montoya	Team Penske	Chevrolet	218 mph

=== Testing — October 2017 ===
Following the conclusion of the 2017 IndyCar Series season, each manufacturer was allocated five days of aero kit testing through December 17. The league stipulated one test for each manufacturer, leaving four dates to the manufacturer's discretion. Honda elected to use one of their four dates at Indianapolis on October 26. James Hinchcliffe (Schmidt Peterson) and Scott Dixon (Ganassi) each completed more than 130 laps without incident. Cool temperatures delayed the start of the test until the afternoon, and testing concluded at 6 p.m. Speeds were not reported.

Manufacturer testing — Participants
Driver	Team	Engine
(Canada) James Hinchcliffe	Schmidt Peterson Motorsports	Honda
(New Zealand) Scott Dixon	Chip Ganassi Racing	Honda

=== Open test — Monday April 30 ===
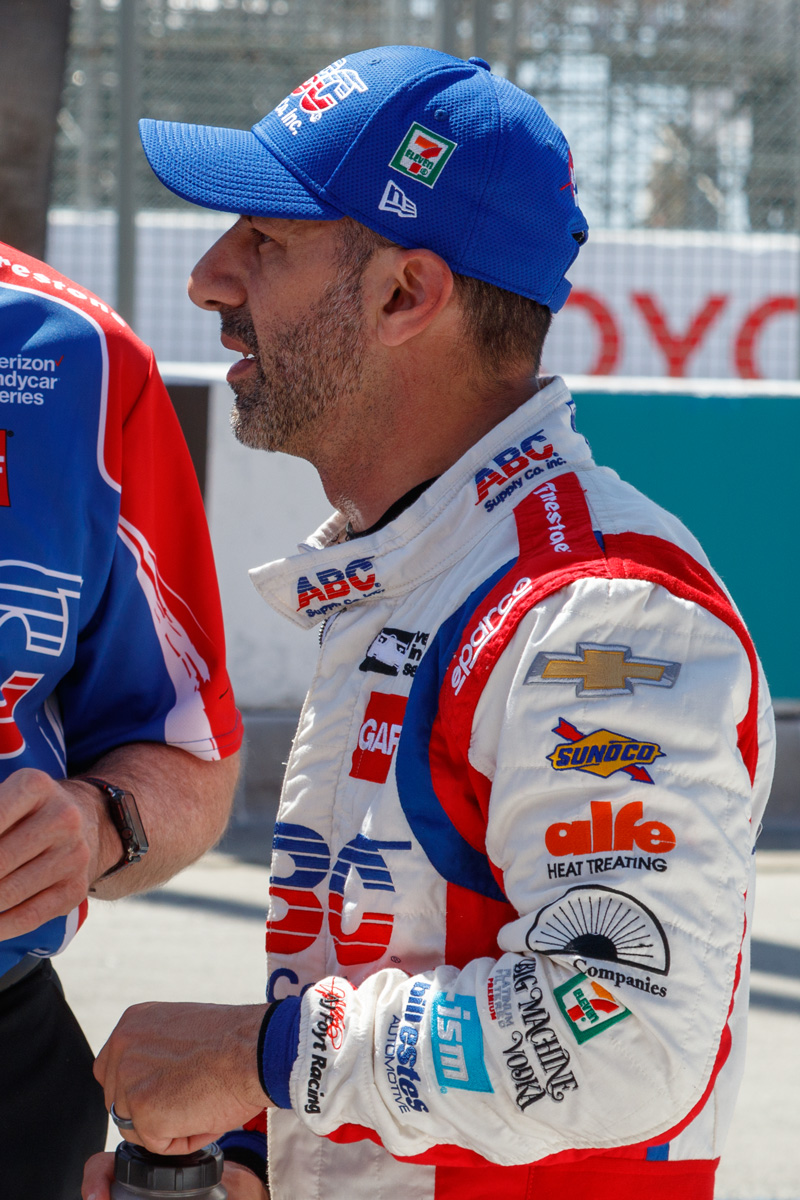
Tony Kanaan led the speed chart during the Open Test.

- Weather: 72 °F (22 °C), sunny and clear
- Summary: An open test was scheduled for Monday April 30, 2018. The test was open to full-time IndyCar teams and drivers, and 21 drivers participated. Rookie drivers and drivers requiring refresher tests were not permitted to participate on Monday. Sunny blue skies greeted the teams at the test, which had been originally scheduled for March, but was postponed due to bad weather. Tony Kanaan (226.181 mph) set the fastest lap of the day, as well as the fastest no-tow lap at 223.240 mph. The test was split into two session, with Marco Andretti (223.997 mph) leading the morning session, and Kanaan leading the afternoon session. The 21 drivers completed 1,820 laps without incident. Late in the day, Josef Newgarden conducted an evaluation test with a windscreen, the first such test on a superspeedway. Since the test took place one day prior to May 1 and the traditional month of May, it was affectionately referred to as "May 0".

Top Practice Speeds
Pos	No.	Driver	Team	Engine	Speed
1	14	(Brazil) Tony Kanaan	AJ Foyt Enterprises	Chevrolet	226.181
2	22	(France) Simon Pagenaud	Team Penske	Chevrolet	225.910
3	98	(United States) Marco Andretti	Andretti Herta Autosport	Honda	225.637
OFFICIAL REPORT

=== Rookie Orientation Program / Refresher tests — Tuesday May 1 ===
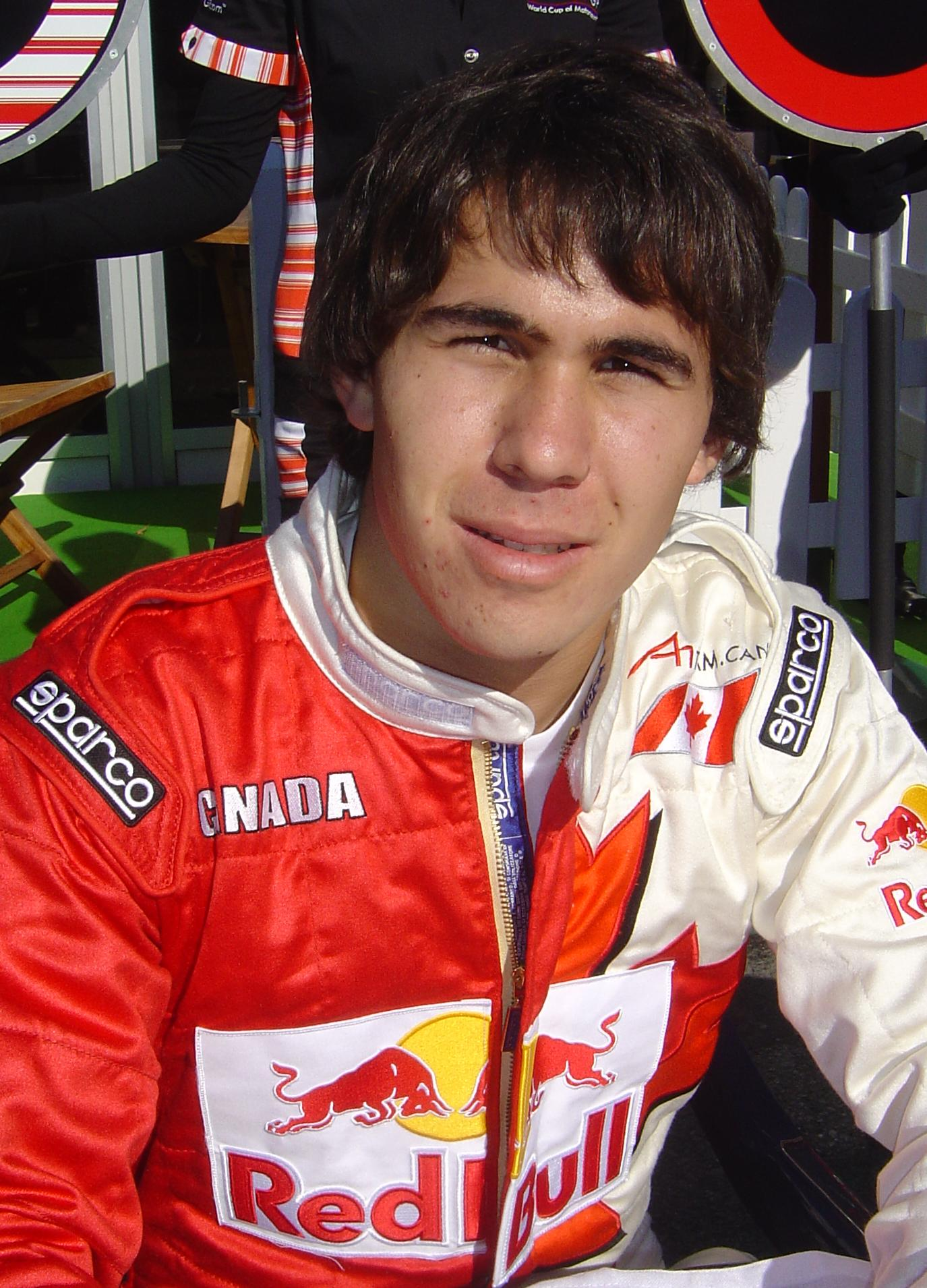
Robert Wickens set the fastest lap during rookie orientation.

- Weather: 81 °F (27 °C), Sunny and clear
- Summary: The Rookie Orientation Program and veteran Refresher tests are scheduled for Tuesday May 1, 2018. Four drivers were scheduled to participate in rookie orientation: Pietro Fittipaldi (Coyne), Kyle Kaiser (Juncos), Matheus Leist (Foyt), and Robert Wickens (SPM). Three drivers were scheduled to take refresher tests: Jay Howard (SPM), Sage Karam (D&R), and Danica Patrick (Carpenter). The rookie test consisted of three phases. Phase 1 was ten laps at 205 mph, Phase 2 was ten laps at 210 mph, and Phase 3 was ten laps at 215 mph. During the three-hour morning session (10:00 a.m. to 1:00 p.m.), Kaiser, Leist, and Wickens passed all three phases of the rookie test. Pietro Fittipaldi, however, did not participate due to commitments at the 6 Hours of Spa, opting instead to partake in rookie orientation later in the month. Three days later, however, Fittipaldi withdrew after suffering injuries in a crash at Spa. The afternoon session, lasting from 2:00 p.m to 5:00 p.m., saw the three participants in the refresher program take to the track. The refresher test consisted of two phases, equivalent to phases 2 and 3 of the rookie test. Howard, Patrick, and Karam all passed their program before the session concluded. Robert Wickens was fastest of the six drivers of the day, setting a speed of 220.111 mph while piloting his teammate James Hinchcliffe's car following gearbox issues with his own. Danica Patrick took to the track for an installation lap right at 2:00 p.m., but had to return to the garage area due to minor overheating issues. About an hour later, the team returned, and Patrick was able to complete her refresher test. It was Patrick's first laps at Indianapolis in an Indy car since 2011. The six drivers completed 355 laps without any incidents, although Jay Howard nearly tagged the wall at the exit of turn two during a practice run.

Top Practice Speeds
Pos	No.	Driver	Team	Engine	Speed
1	5	(Canada) Robert Wickens	Schmidt Peterson Motorsports	Honda	220.111
2	4	(Brazil) Matheus Leist	A. J. Foyt Enterprises	Chevrolet	220.073
3	5	(United Kingdom) Jay Howard	Schmidt Peterson Motorsports	Honda	219.684
OFFICIAL REPORT

=== Testing — Wednesday May 2 ===
- Weather: 84 °F (29 °C), Sunny and windy
- Practice summary: A private manufacturers test for Honda and Chevrolet was scheduled for Wednesday May 2, 2018. Windy conditions hampered running during the day, but teams were able to do some running early on. Tony Kanaan led the time charts, setting a speed of 226.680 mph, ahead of Ed Carpenter and Gabby Chaves. Robert Wickens (223.7 mph) was the fastest Honda entry. The other participants included Charlie Kimball, Danica Patrick, Matheus Leist, Ed Jones, Scott Dixon, James Hinchcliffe, and Max Chilton.

Top Practice Speeds
Pos	No.	Driver	Team	Engine	Speed
1	14	(Brazil) Tony Kanaan	A. J. Foyt Enterprises	Chevrolet	226.680
2	20	(United States) Ed Carpenter	Ed Carpenter Racing	Chevrolet	224.466
3	88	(Colombia) Gabby Chaves	Harding Racing	Chevrolet	223.658
OFFICIAL REPORT

== Practice ==
=== Tuesday May 15 ===
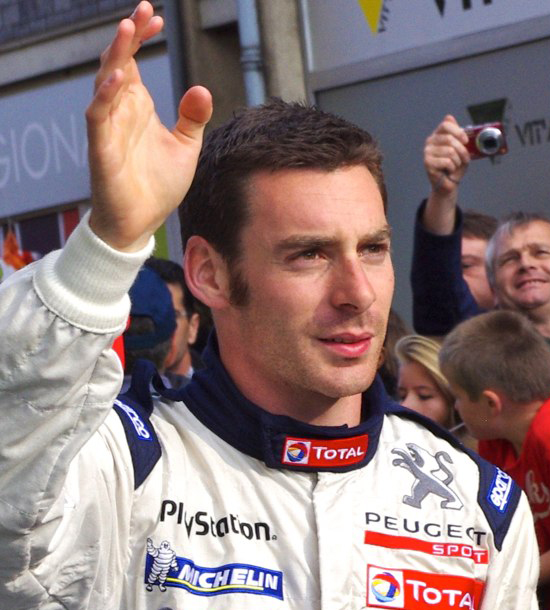
Simon Pagenaud led the practice speeds on May 15.

- Weather: 83 °F (28 °C), Scattered showers, thunderstorms late
- Practice summary: The opening day of practice consisted of three sessions: The first from 11:00 a.m. to 1:00 p.m. reserved for veteran drivers, the second from 1:00 p.m. to 3:00 p.m. serving as the rookie and refresher period for those unable to partake in the May 1 session, and the final session from 3:00 p.m. to 6:00 p.m. open to all cars. During the rookie/refresher period, Zachary Claman DeMelo (replacing Fittipaldi) completed his rookie orientation testing, while James Davison successfully completed his refresher test. Oriol Servià and Stefan Wilson began their refresher tests during the period, but completed them during the open session later in the day. The third session of the day was interrupted by a passing thunderstorm just before 4:00 p.m., but the session was resumed after roughly an hour's wait. The fastest time of the day was set by Team Penske's Simon Pagenaud with a speed of 225.787 mph set in the first session. The fastest "no-tow" speed of the day went to Ed Carpenter, turning a lap at 221.512 mph without the aid of drafting.

Top Practice Speeds
Pos	No.	Driver	Team	Engine	Speed
1	22	(France) Simon Pagenaud	Team Penske	Chevrolet	225.787
2	3	(Brazil) Hélio Castroneves	Team Penske	Chevrolet	224.665
3	20	(United States) Ed Carpenter	Ed Carpenter Racing	Chevrolet	224.523
OFFICIAL REPORT

=== Wednesday May 16 ===
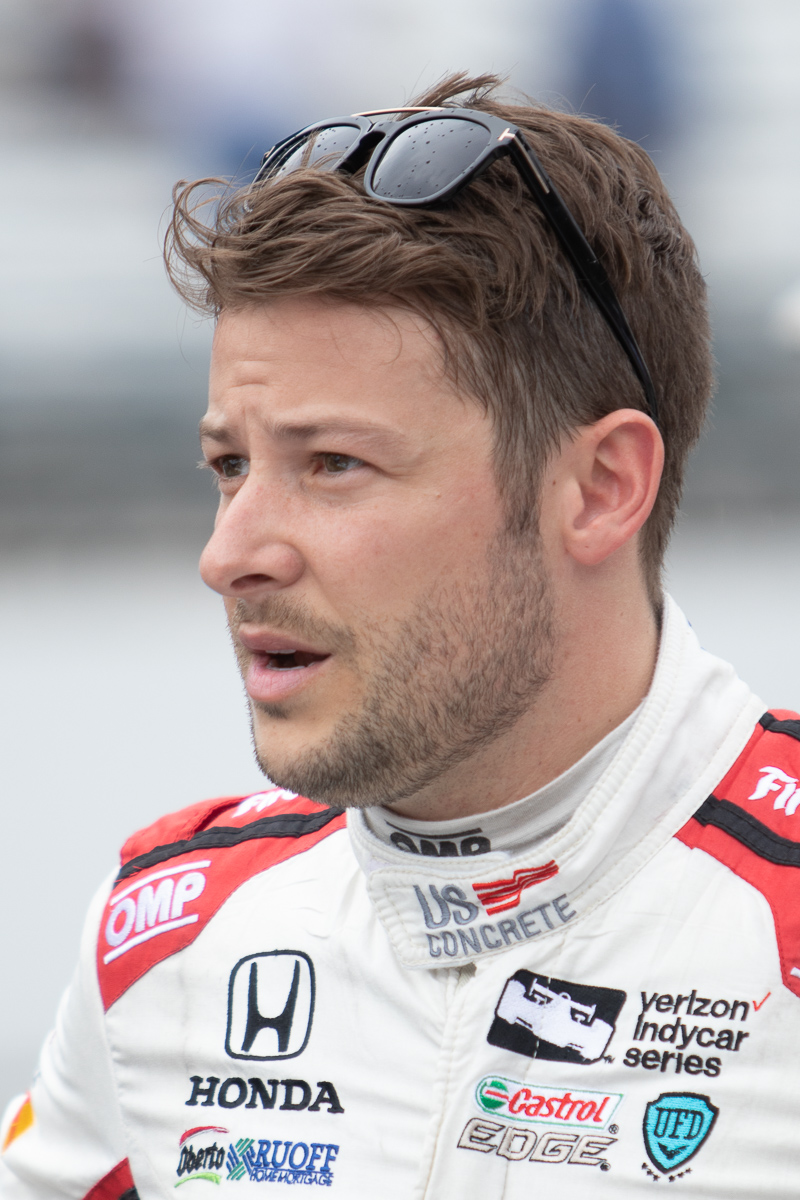
Marco Andretti led practice on May 16.

- Weather: 79 °F (26 °C), Mostly overcast, sunny late
- Practice summary: The second day of practice ran smoothly and without interruption from rain. Only one minor incident occurred during the session when Tony Kanaan came to a halt on the backstretch at 4:02 p.m. with a failed throttle sensor. Andretti Autosport driver Marco Andretti set the fastest time of the day, being the first driver to eclipse 227 mph with his speed of 227.053 mph. Despite the issues with his car, Tony Kanaan set the fastest "no-tow" speed of the day with a lap at 223.048 mph. All 35 cars entered took laps during the day, completing 3,349 laps, the busiest single practice day in over a decade.

Top Practice Speeds
Pos	No.	Driver	Team	Engine	Speed
1	98	(United States) Marco Andretti	Andretti Herta Autosport	Honda	227.053
2	9	(New Zealand) Scott Dixon	Chip Ganassi Racing	Honda	226.329
3	30	(Japan) Takuma Sato	Rahal Letterman Lanigan Racing	Honda	226.108
OFFICIAL REPORT

=== Thursday May 17 ===
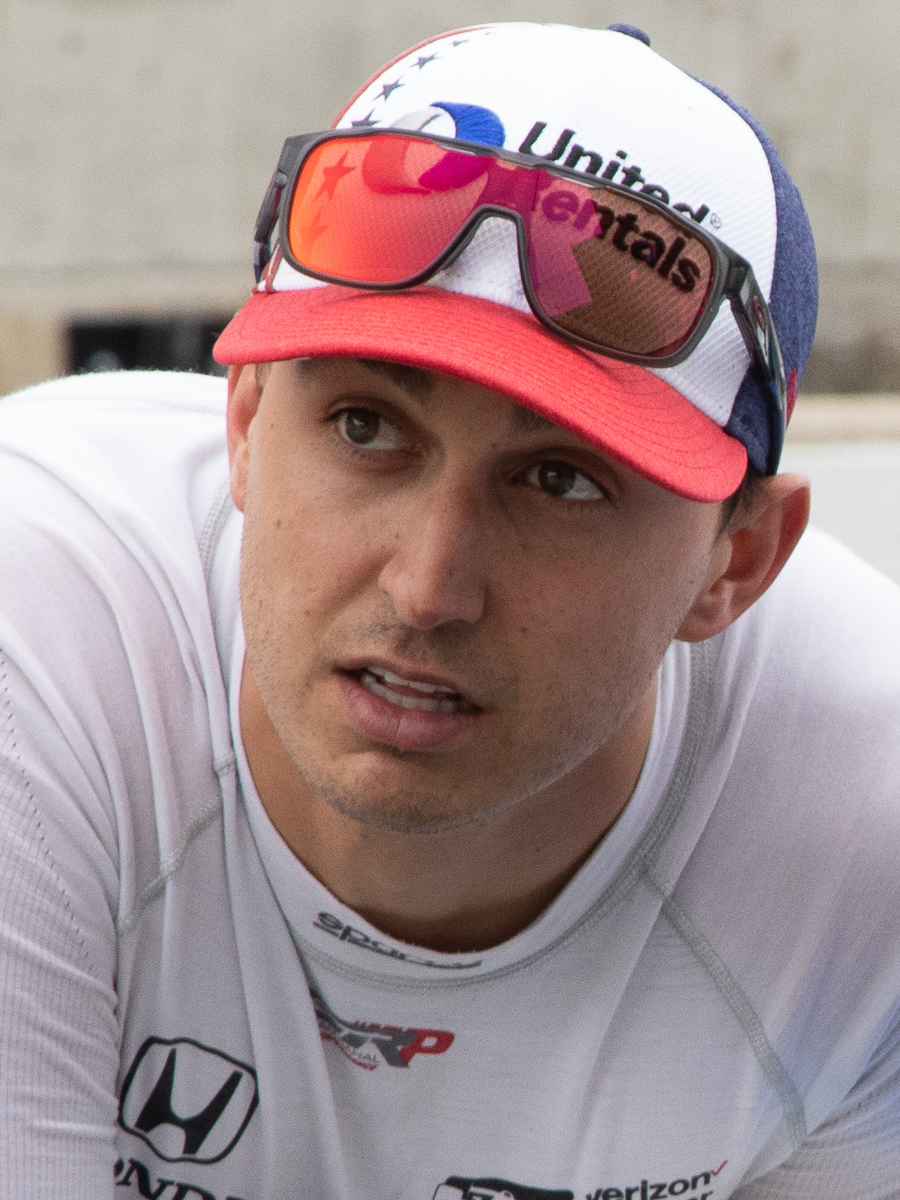
Graham Rahal went fastest on May 17

- Weather: 83 °F (28 °C), Sunny
- Practice summary: Sunny skies greeted teams and drivers for the Thursday session of practice. The first incident of the month occurred with roughly 20 minutes left in the session, when J. R. Hildebrand drifted wide coming out of turn 3 and hit the wall, then slid against it through turn four before finally coming to a halt just before pit entry. Graham Rahal set the fastest speed of the day, turning a lap at 226.047 mph. Will Power ran the fastest "no-tow" lap at 223.971 mph.

Top Practice Speeds
Pos	No.	Driver	Team	Engine	Speed
1	15	(United States) Graham Rahal	Rahal Letterman Lanigan Racing	Honda	226.047
2	14	(Brazil) Tony Kanaan	A. J. Foyt Enterprises	Chevrolet	225.896
3	98	(United States) Marco Andretti	Andretti Herta Autosport	Honda	225.584
OFFICIAL REPORT

=== Fast Friday — Friday May 18 ===
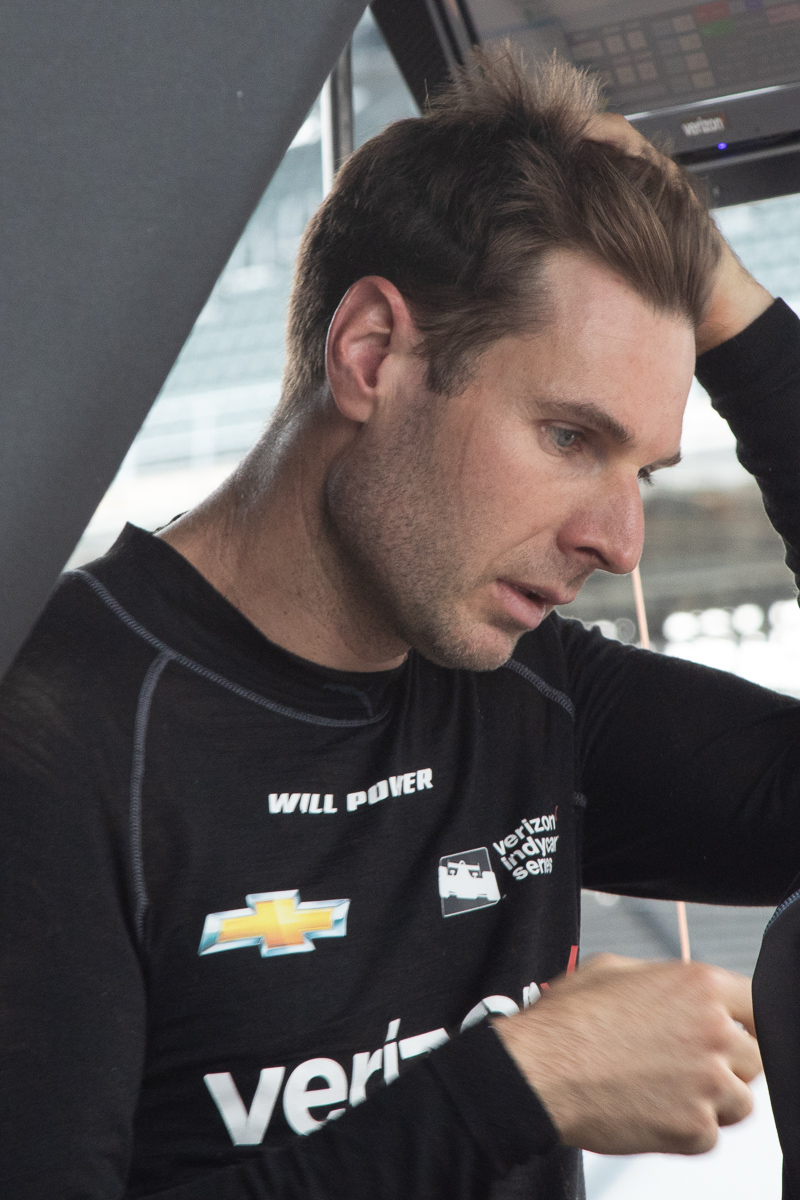
Will Power set the fastest "no-tow" speed on Fast Friday.

- Weather: 72 °F (22 °C), Scattered showers.
- Practice summary: The threat of rain loomed for the entirety of "Fast Friday," but only brought about a brief stoppage to the session in the afternoon. Increased boost levels in preparation for qualifying saw speeds greatly increase, with Marco Andretti setting the fastest speed of the month with a time at 231.802 mph. Will Power set the fastest "no-tow" lap of the day at 229.780 mph. One major incident occurred during the day when James Davison lost control of his car in turn 2, spun around and impacted the outside wall.

Top Practice Speeds
Pos	No.	Driver	Team	Engine	Speed
1	98	(United States) Marco Andretti	Andretti Herta Autosport	Honda	231.802
2	6	(Canada) Robert Wickens	Schmidt Peterson Motorsports	Honda	231.732
3	20	(United States) Ed Carpenter	Ed Carpenter Racing	Chevrolet	231.066
OFFICIAL REPORT

== Time trials ==
=== Bump Day — Saturday, May 19 ===
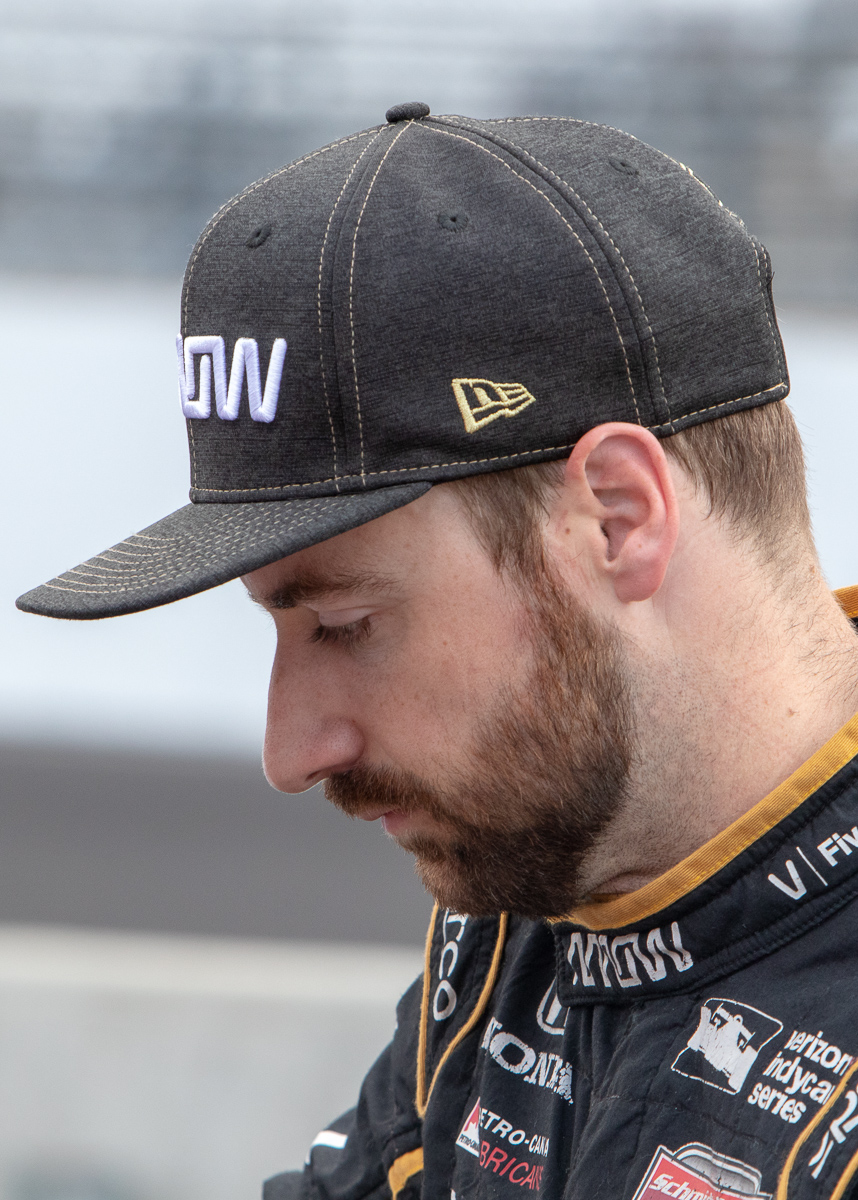
2016 Indianapolis 500 Pole winner and two time second place qualifier, James Hinchcliffe, got bumped from the field during Bump Day qualifying.

- Weather: 79 °F (26 °C), Scattered showers.

Bump Day was held on May 19. The 33 cars that would comprise the starting lineup would be determined, as well as the nine cars eligible for the "Fast 9" shoot-out to be held on Sunday to determine pole position. Two periods of rain caused delays during the course of the day, but all 35 entries were able to make attempts.

Hélio Castroneves set the fastest speed of the day with a four-lap average of 228.919 mph, besting Ed Carpenter and Simon Pagenaud. Completing the Fast Nine were Will Power, Sébastien Bourdais, Spencer Pigot, Josef Newgarden, Scott Dixon, and Danica Patrick.

At the opposite end of the field, several entries struggled to find the speed necessary to make the starting lineup. The three cars of Rahal Letterman Lanigan Racing (Takuma Sato, Graham Rahal, and Oriol Servià in particular) all had difficulties, but all three held on to make the field. Servià made three attempts, and finally made the field safely with about 35 minutes left in the day. Other drivers facing difficulty included Conor Daly and Pippa Mann. Daly would make the field, but despite being the last qualifier of the day, Mann failed to qualify.

The most shocking story of day, however, was 2016 pole sitter, and three-time front row starter, James Hinchcliffe, who was bumped from the field. Hinchcliffe's first qualifying attempt came after the first rain delay, with less than ideal chassis setups. Hinchcliffe steadily slipped down the standings, and was bumped from the field in the final half hour. The team quickly got the car into the qualifying line, and Hinchcliffe pulled away for his second attempt with less than fifteen minutes left in the day. On his warm-up lap, he detected a bad vibration, and had to abort the run and return to the pits. A tire pressure sensor inside one of the wheels had come loose, and was ricocheting inside the tire. The crew desperately scrambled to diagnose the problem, change tires, and get back into the qualifying line. However, the gun went off at 5:50 p.m. to close qualifying, with Hinchcliffe still waiting in line.

After his crash during practice on Friday, and after his crew worked late into the night to make repairs, James Davison ended the day on the bubble. Davison posted the 33rd-fastest speed Saturday, and held on to make the field.

Pos.	No.	Driver	Team	Engine	Speed
Fast Nine Qualifiers
1	3	(Brazil) Hélio Castroneves	Team Penske	Chevrolet	228.919
2	20	(United States) Ed Carpenter	Ed Carpenter Racing	Chevrolet	228.692
3	22	(France) Simon Pagenaud	Team Penske	Chevrolet	228.304
4	12	(Australia) Will Power	Team Penske	Chevrolet	228.194
5	18	(France) Sébastien Bourdais	Dale Coyne Racing with Vasser-Sullivan	Honda	228.090
6	21	(United States) Spencer Pigot	Ed Carpenter Racing	Chevrolet	228.052
7	1	(United States) Josef Newgarden	Team Penske	Chevrolet	228.049
8	9	(New Zealand) Scott Dixon	Chip Ganassi Racing	Honda	227.782
9	13	(United States) Danica Patrick	Ed Carpenter Racing	Chevrolet	227.610
Positions 10–33
10	27	(United States) Alexander Rossi	Andretti Autosport	Honda	227.561
11	14	(Brazil) Tony Kanaan	A. J. Foyt Enterprises	Chevrolet	227.508
12	4	(Brazil) Matheus Leist R	A. J. Foyt Enterprises	Chevrolet	227.441
13	10	(United Arab Emirates) Ed Jones	Chip Ganassi Racing	Honda	226.995
14	28	(United States) Ryan Hunter-Reay	Andretti Autosport	Honda	226.952
15	29	(Colombia) Carlos Muñoz	Andretti Autosport	Honda	226.600
16	66	(United States) J. R. Hildebrand	Dreyer & Reinbold Racing	Chevrolet	226.499
17	98	(United States) Marco Andretti	Andretti Herta Autosport with Curb-Agajanian	Honda	226.154
18	7	(United Kingdom) Jay Howard	SPM / AFS Racing	Honda	226.098
19	24	(United States) Sage Karam	Dreyer & Reinbold Racing	Chevrolet	226.065
20	6	(Canada) Robert Wickens R	Schmidt Peterson Motorsports	Honda	225.955
21	32	(United States) Kyle Kaiser R	Juncos Racing	Chevrolet	225.934
22	25	(United Kingdom) Stefan Wilson	Andretti Autosport	Honda	225.909
23	88	(Colombia) Gabby Chaves	Harding Racing	Chevrolet	225.808
24	26	(United States) Zach Veach	Andretti Autosport	Honda	225.805
25	23	(United States) Charlie Kimball	Carlin	Chevrolet	225.752
26	19	(Canada) Zachary Claman DeMelo R	Dale Coyne Racing	Honda	225.722
27	60	(United Kingdom) Jack Harvey	Meyer Shank Racing with Schmidt Peterson	Honda	225.720
28	59	(United Kingdom) Max Chilton	Carlin	Chevrolet	225.666
29	30	(Japan) Takuma Sato	Rahal Letterman Lanigan Racing	Honda	225.513
30	15	(United States) Graham Rahal	Rahal Letterman Lanigan Racing	Honda	225.407
31	64	(Spain) Oriol Servià	Scuderia Corsa with RLL	Honda	225.007
32	17	(United States) Conor Daly	Dale Coyne Racing dba Thom Burns Racing	Honda	224.874
33	33	(Australia) James Davison	Foyt with Byrd / Hollinger / Belardi	Chevrolet	224.798
Failed To Qualify
34	63	(United Kingdom) Pippa Mann	Dale Coyne Racing	Honda	223.343
35	5	(Canada) James Hinchcliffe	Schmidt Peterson Motorsports	Honda	Time Withdrawn
OFFICIAL REPORT

=== Pole Day — Sunday, May 20 ===
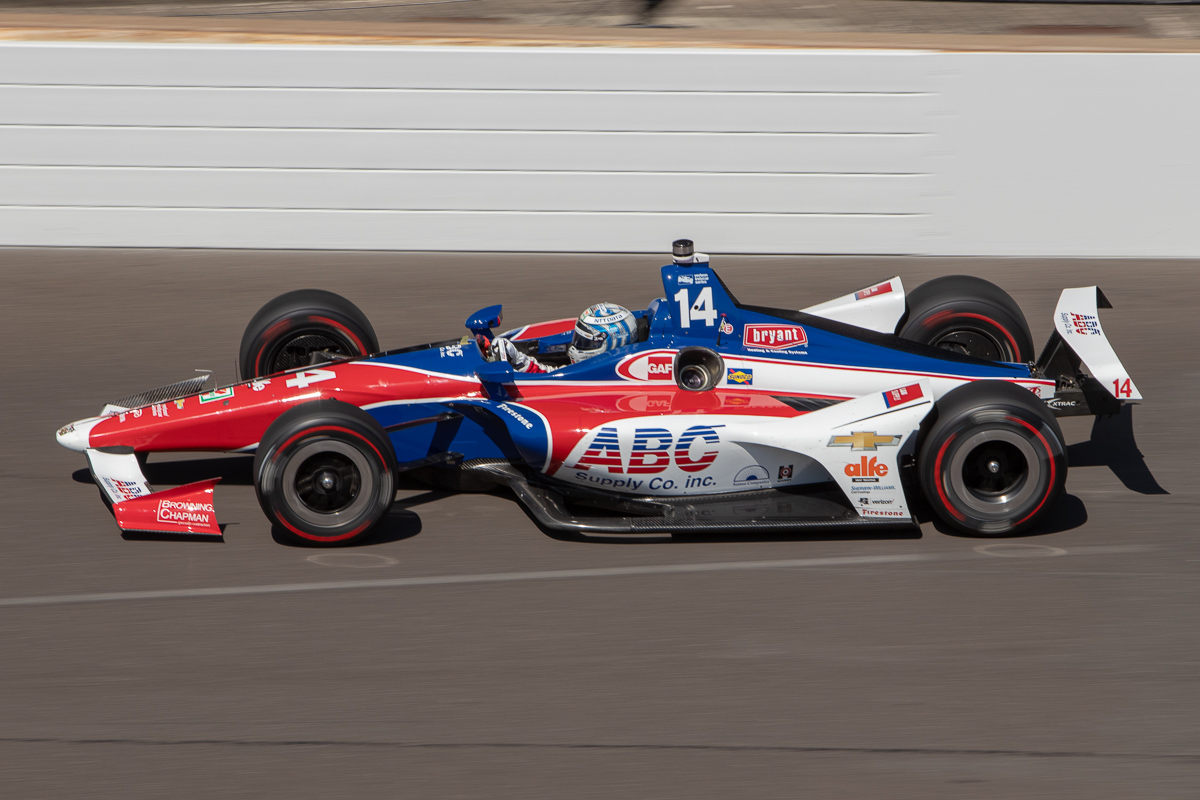
Tony Kanaan led the 10th-33rd group.

- Weather: 83 °F (28 °C), Showers early, mostly sunny in the afternoon.

==== Positions 10-33 ====
Sunny skies meant no interruptions to qualifying during Sunday qualifications. The opening session determined positions 10–33 on the starting grid, with drivers taking to the track in reverse order of their ranking from their Bump Day runs. Tony Kanaan went fastest in the group, besting his teammate Matheus Leist, who ended the day as the fastest rookie qualifier. Several favorites struggled to find speed during the day, including 2016 winner Alexander Rossi, who slipped to 32nd after fighting an ill-handling car during his run.

Big gainers for the day included James Davison, who improved from 33rd on Saturday to 19th on Sunday. Defending race winner Takuma Sato also went from 29th on Saturday to 16th on Sunday. Sato's teammate Graham Rahal, however, ended the day in the same position as the day before (30th).

Pos.	No.	Driver	Team	Engine	Speed
Positions 10–33
10	14	(Brazil) Tony Kanaan	A. J. Foyt Enterprises	Chevrolet	227.664
11	4	(Brazil) Matheus Leist R	A. J. Foyt Enterprises	Chevrolet	227.571
12	98	(United States) Marco Andretti	Andretti Herta Autosport with Curb-Agajanian	Honda	227.288
13	19	(Canada) Zachary Claman DeMelo R	Dale Coyne Racing	Honda	226.999
14	28	(United States) Ryan Hunter-Reay	Andretti Autosport	Honda	226.788
15	23	(United States) Charlie Kimball	Carlin	Chevrolet	226.657
16	30	(Japan) Takuma Sato	Rahal Letterman Lanigan Racing	Honda	226.557
17	32	(United States) Kyle Kaiser R	Juncos Racing	Chevrolet	226.398
18	6	(Canada) Robert Wickens R	Schmidt Peterson Motorsports	Honda	226.296
19	33	(Australia) James Davison	Foyt with Byrd / Hollinger / Belardi	Chevrolet	226.255
20	59	(United Kingdom) Max Chilton	Carlin	Chevrolet	226.212
21	29	(Colombia) Carlos Muñoz	Andretti Autosport	Honda	226.048
22	88	(Colombia) Gabby Chaves	Harding Racing	Chevrolet	226.007
23	25	(United Kingdom) Stefan Wilson	Andretti Autosport	Honda	225.863
24	24	(United States) Sage Karam	Dreyer & Reinbold Racing	Chevrolet	225.823
25	26	(United States) Zach Veach	Andretti Autosport	Honda	225.748
26	64	(Spain) Oriol Servià	Scuderia Corsa with RLL	Honda	225.699
27	66	(United States) J. R. Hildebrand	Dreyer & Reinbold Racing	Chevrolet	225.418
28	7	(United Kingdom) Jay Howard	SPM / AFS Racing	Honda	225.388
29	10	(United Arab Emirates) Ed Jones	Chip Ganassi Racing	Honda	225.362
30	15	(United States) Graham Rahal	Rahal Letterman Lanigan Racing	Honda	225.327
31	60	(United Kingdom) Jack Harvey	Meyer Shank Racing with Schmidt Peterson	Honda	225.254
32	27	(United States) Alexander Rossi	Andretti Autosport	Honda	224.935
33	17	(United States) Conor Daly	Dale Coyne Racing dba Thom Burns Racing	Honda	224.429
OFFICIAL REPORT

==== Firestone Fast Nine ====
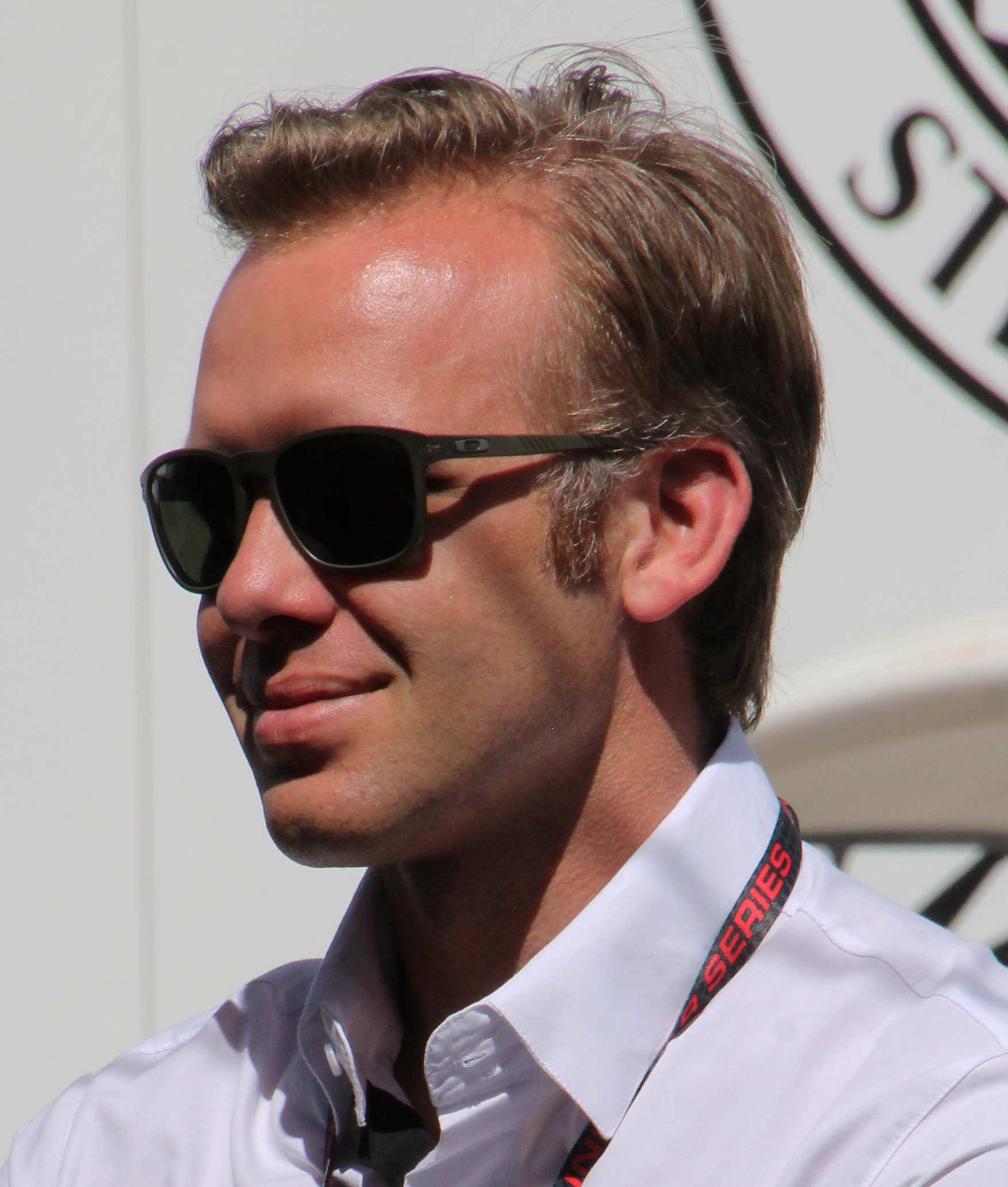
Ed Carpenter qualified on pole for the 500 for the third time in his career.

"Fast Nine" qualifications began at 5:00 p.m., with drivers who qualified in the top nine the previous day taking to the track in reverse order in their bid to win pole position. For the third time in his career, Ed Carpenter secured pole position for the race, posting a four-lap average at 229.618 mph. Team Penske teammates Simon Pagenaud and Will Power completed the front row. Danica Patrick placed 7th in her return qualification at the course.

Pos.	No.	Driver	Team	Engine	Speed
Firestone Fast Nine Shootout
1	20	(United States) Ed Carpenter	Ed Carpenter Racing	Chevrolet	229.618
2	22	(France) Simon Pagenaud	Team Penske	Chevrolet	228.761
3	12	(Australia) Will Power	Team Penske	Chevrolet	228.607
4	1	(United States) Josef Newgarden	Team Penske	Chevrolet	228.405
5	18	(France) Sébastien Bourdais	Dale Coyne Racing with Vasser-Sullivan	Honda	228.142
6	21	(United States) Spencer Pigot	Ed Carpenter Racing	Chevrolet	228.107
7	13	(United States) Danica Patrick	Ed Carpenter Racing	Chevrolet	228.090
8	3	(Brazil) Hélio Castroneves	Team Penske	Chevrolet	227.859
9	9	(New Zealand) Scott Dixon	Chip Ganassi Racing	Honda	227.262

== Post-qualifying practice ==
=== Post-qualifying practice — Monday May 21 ===
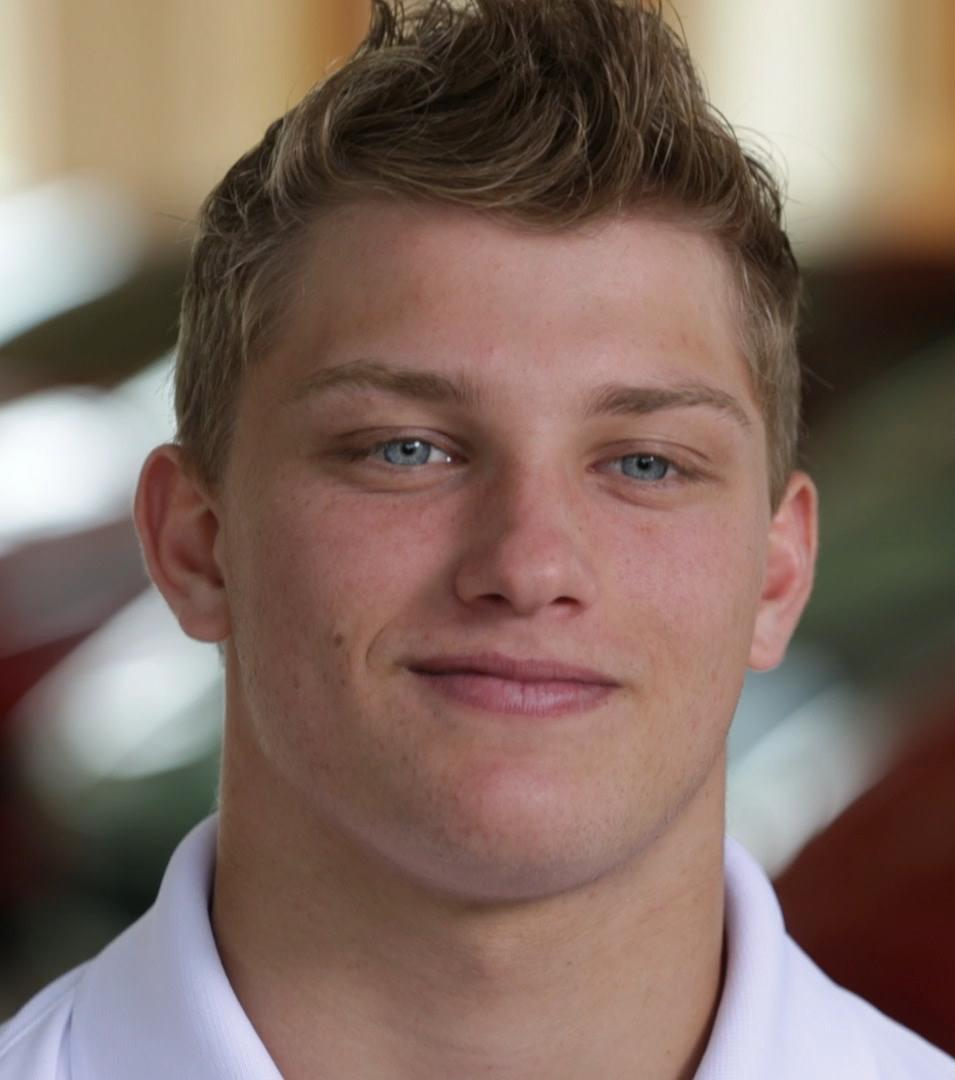
Sage Karam was fastest in post-qualifying practice.

- Weather: 80 °F (27 °C), Showers early, mostly sunny in afternoon
- Practice summary: Post-qualifying practice ran from 12:30 p.m. to 4:00 p.m., the session ending earlier than previous day to allow testing for Indy Lights later in the day. Practice was briefly delayed by a passing shower, but was not a factor for the rest of the day. The session saw one major incident when rookie Robert Wickens drifted wide and brushed the outside wall in turn 2. The brush bent the right side suspension of Wickens' car, causing it to veer sharply to the right halfway down the backstretch and hit the outside wall, causing significant damage to the No. 6 car. Wickens emerged uninjured. Sage Karam set the fastest speed of the day at 226.461 mph, besting Tony Kanaan and Ryan Hunter-Reay.

Top Practice Speeds
Pos	No.	Driver	Team	Engine	Speed
1	24	(United States) Sage Karam	Dreyer & Reinbold Racing	Chevrolet	226.461
2	14	(Brazil) Tony Kanaan	A. J. Foyt Enterprises	Chevrolet	225.123
3	28	(United States) Ryan Hunter-Reay	Andretti Autosport	Honda	224.820
OFFICIAL REPORT

=== Carb Day — Friday May 25 ===
- Weather: 88 °F (31 °C), Mostly sunny
- Practice summary: The final, hour-long practice session before the race saw no major incidents as drivers attempted to make any necessary last minute adjustments to their cars. The session also saw the hottest weather of all practice sessions. Tony Kanaan led the speed charts in the session, posting a lap at 227.791 mph. Danica Patrick's car suffered electrical issues, and had to be wheeled back to the garage for repairs. However, the team hustled to get the car back out on the track, and she completed 15 laps, posting the 8th-best speed of the day.

Top Practice Speeds
Pos	No.	Driver	Team	Engine	Speed
1	14	(Brazil) Tony Kanaan	A. J. Foyt Enterprises	Chevrolet	227.791
2	9	(New Zealand) Scott Dixon	Chip Ganassi Racing	Honda	225.684
3	98	(United States) Marco Andretti	Andretti Herta Autosport	Honda	225.220
OFFICIAL REPORT

=== Pit Stop Challenge ===
The 41st annual Pit Stop Challenge was held on Friday May 25. Because of rules that qualification included pit stop performance during the season, James Hinchcliffe of Schmidt Peterson Motorsports was part of the event although he did not qualify for the race. Schmidt Peterson Motorsports had three entries for the Indianapolis 500, with two full-time teams (No. 5 and No. 6) and a third team for the Indianapolis 500 only, the No. 7 team. After the No. 5 failed to qualify, the team subsequently assigned the No. 5 pit crew to pit the No. 7 driven by Jay Howard for the race, and advanced all the way to the finals. Hinchcliffe battled Scott Dixon of Chip Ganassi Racing in a best-of-three finals, with Dixon's team taking the victory.

First Round
24	Dreyer & Reinbold (Sage Karam)	13.295
1	Team Penske (Josef Newgarden)	12.290

Quarterfinals
1	Team Penske (Josef Newgarden)	12.334
12	Team Penske (Will Power)	11.888
6	Schmidt Peterson (Robert Wickens)	13.117
7	Schmidt Peterson (James Hinchcliffe)	12.242
27	Andretti Autosport (Alexander Rossi)	13.780
15	Rahal Letterman Lanigan (Graham Rahal)	14.195
10	Chip Ganassi (Ed Jones)	17.535
9	Chip Ganassi (Scott Dixon)	11.948

Semifinals
12	Team Penske (Will Power)	14.100
7	Schmidt Peterson (James Hinchcliffe)	13.545
27	Andretti Autosport (Alexander Rossi)	13.670
9	Chip Ganassi (Scott Dixon)	12.658

Finals
7	Schmidt Peterson (James Hinchcliffe)	1
9	Chip Ganassi (Scott Dixon)	2

NOTE: Since the No. 5 Schmidt Peterson Motorsports car failed to qualify for the Indianapolis 500 race, the pit crew was assigned to the No. 7 car for the race. The crew was registered by the Speedway as the No. 7 crew as it would be that team during the race, even though it used its regular driver during the competition.

Finals
7	Schmidt Peterson (James Hinchcliffe)	L	W	12.495
9	Chip Ganassi (Scott Dixon)	W	L	11.614

== Starting grid ==
R = Indianapolis 500 rookie; W = Former Indianapolis 500 winner

Row	Inside		Middle		Outside	
1	20	(United States) Ed Carpenter	22	(France) Simon Pagenaud	12	(Australia) Will Power
2	1	(United States) Josef Newgarden	18	(France) Sébastien Bourdais	21	(United States) Spencer Pigot
3	13	(United States) Danica Patrick	3	(Brazil) Hélio Castroneves (W)	9	(New Zealand) Scott Dixon (W)
4	14	(Brazil) Tony Kanaan (W)	4	(Brazil) Matheus Leist (R)	98	(United States) Marco Andretti
5	19	(Canada) Zachary Claman DeMelo (R)	28	(United States) Ryan Hunter-Reay (W)	23	(United States) Charlie Kimball
6	30	(Japan) Takuma Sato (W)	32	(United States) Kyle Kaiser (R)	6	(Canada) Robert Wickens (R)
7	33	(Australia) James Davison	59	(United Kingdom) Max Chilton	29	(Colombia) Carlos Muñoz
8	88	(Colombia) Gabby Chaves	25	(United Kingdom) Stefan Wilson	24	(United States) Sage Karam
9	26	(United States) Zach Veach	64	(Spain) Oriol Servià	66	(United States) J. R. Hildebrand
10	7	(United Kingdom) Jay Howard	10	(United Arab Emirates) Ed Jones	15	(United States) Graham Rahal
11	60	(United Kingdom) Jack Harvey	27	(United States) Alexander Rossi (W)	17	(United States) Conor Daly

Failed to qualify

No.	Driver	Team	Reason
5	(Canada) James Hinchcliffe	Schmidt Peterson Motorsports	Withdrew first attempt. Second qualification attempt aborted due to left rear wheel vibration.
63	(United Kingdom) Pippa Mann	Dale Coyne Racing	Bumped from field. Too slow on third attempt.

== Race ==
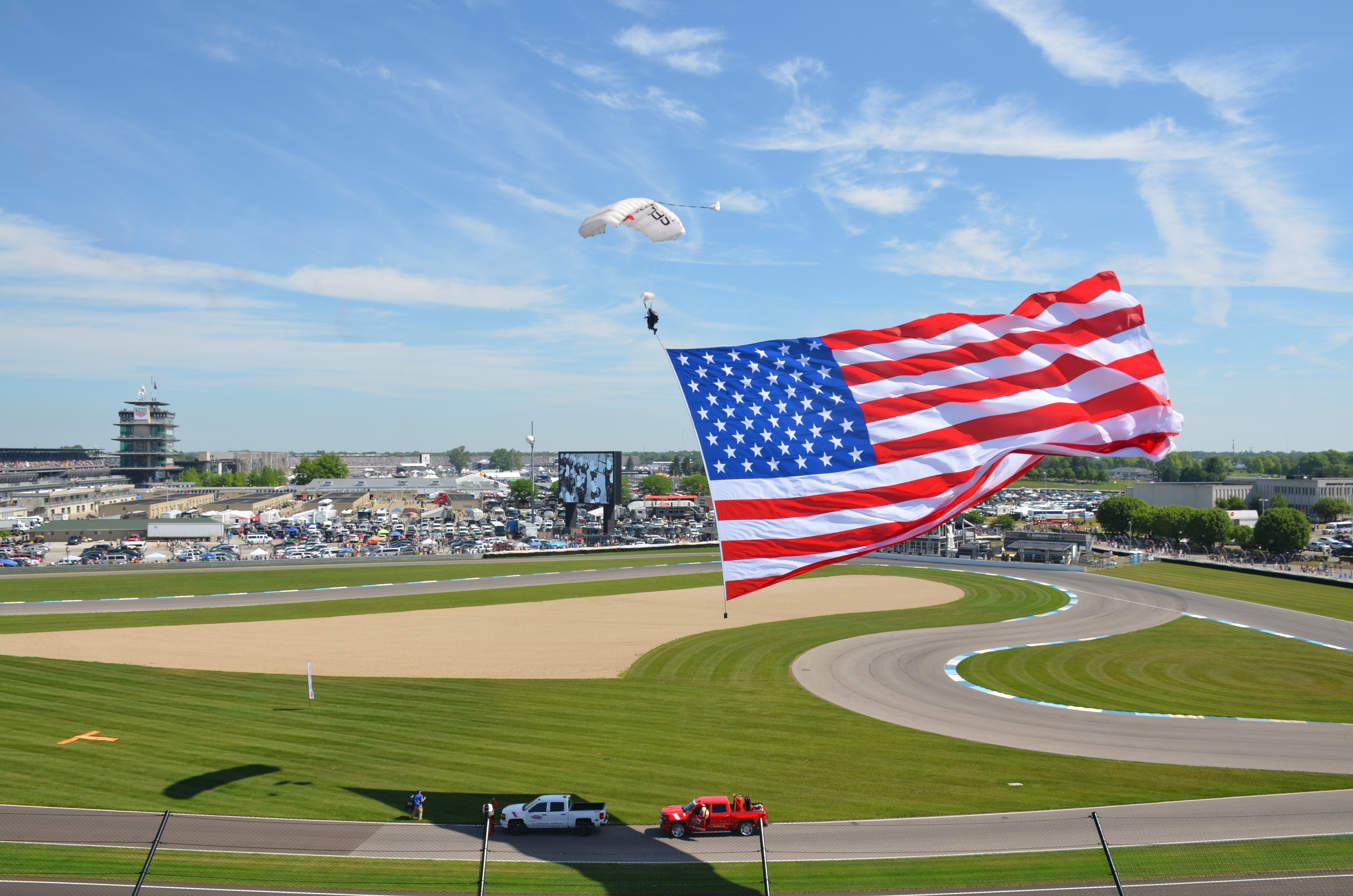
Pre-race ceremonies at the 2018 Indianapolis 500.

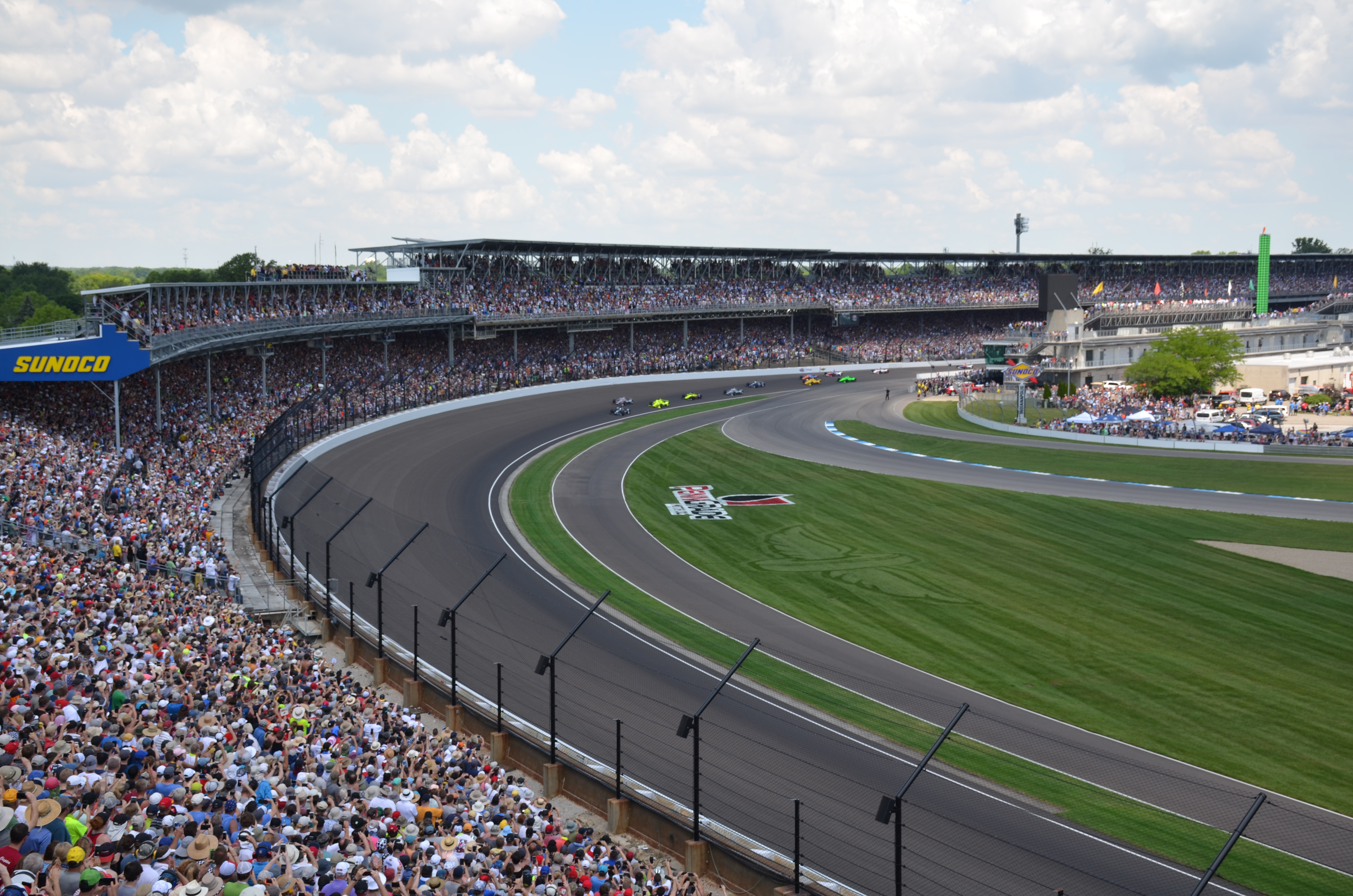
Start of the 2018 Indianapolis 500

=== First half ===
With temperatures flirting with the race day record of 92 °F (33 °C), drivers and teams were forced to figure out how the new aero kits would react to extreme heat. The race began with Ed Carpenter pulling ahead of the field, with Will Power jumping up into second place ahead of Simon Pagenaud. Further back, Tony Kanaan managed an excellent start, jumping up to sixth position from his tenth place starting spot. One lap later, Pagenaud moved back into second place. From there, the field began to spread out; the new aero kit and high heat removed much of the slingshot drafting that defined the last several 500s, thus allowing Carpenter to pull out a roughly two second advantage by the time the first pit stops came. The opening round of stops came around lap 30, with Carpenter maintaining his lead, but Kanaan and Josef Newgarden jumped up to second and third respectively after slightly earlier stops gave the duo an advantage of fresher tires for a few laps. Pagenaud, Hélio Castroneves, and Power rounded up the top six after the first stops were done.

The first caution period of the race came at lap 47 when Takuma Sato came up on backmarker James Davison. Davison, who had been running significantly slower than the rest of the field for several laps, tried to remain high through turn 3 to keep out of the way, but with such speed differential, Sato was unable to avoid Davison's car and collided with Davison's left-rear wheel. Davison's car spun around and continued sliding until it impacted the turn 4 wall, while Sato was able to guide his car to rest in the grass on the inside of turn 4. During the caution, most of the field pitted with Carpenter, Kanaan, and Power emerging first from pit lane. The lead moved to Zachary Claman DeMelo, who elected not to pit during the caution.

Racing resumed at lap 56, with Carpenter and Kanaan passing DeMelo almost as soon as the green flag waved. The green flag period was short lived, though, as, on lap 58, Ed Jones lost control of his car in turn 2, spun around, and impacted the outside wall. Jones emerged from the car under his own power, but was later transported to hospital after complaining of head and neck pain. As the caution flew again, the running order was Carpenter, Kanaan, Newgarden, Pagenaud, DeMelo, Power.

Racing once again resumed at lap 64, with Kanaan getting the jump on Carpenter and taking the lead into turn 1. The next lap, the lead switched back, as Carpenter made his way back around Kanaan into turn one to resume first place. Once again, the green flag stint proved to be short; on lap 68, Danica Patrick lost control of her car in turn 2 in similar fashion to Jones, spinning around and impacting the outside wall before sliding back across the track and impacting the inside wall. Patrick's final 500 resulted in a lowly 30th-place finish. Few drivers elected to pit during the caution, with Newgarden, DeMelo, and Robert Wickens the only major takers.

The next restart came on lap 73, with Kanaan once again passing Carpenter for the lead heading into turn 1, while Power moved into third place after passing Pagenaud. This running order remained unchanged until pit stops came again around lap 90. During the sequence, Power jumped both Kanaan and Carpenter and moved into the lead when cars running out-of-sequence on pit strategy all pitted by lap 106. On lap 99, Kanaan's chances of picking up a second Indy victory were dashed when he picked up a puncture, forcing him back to the pit lane and placing him one lap down.

=== Second half ===
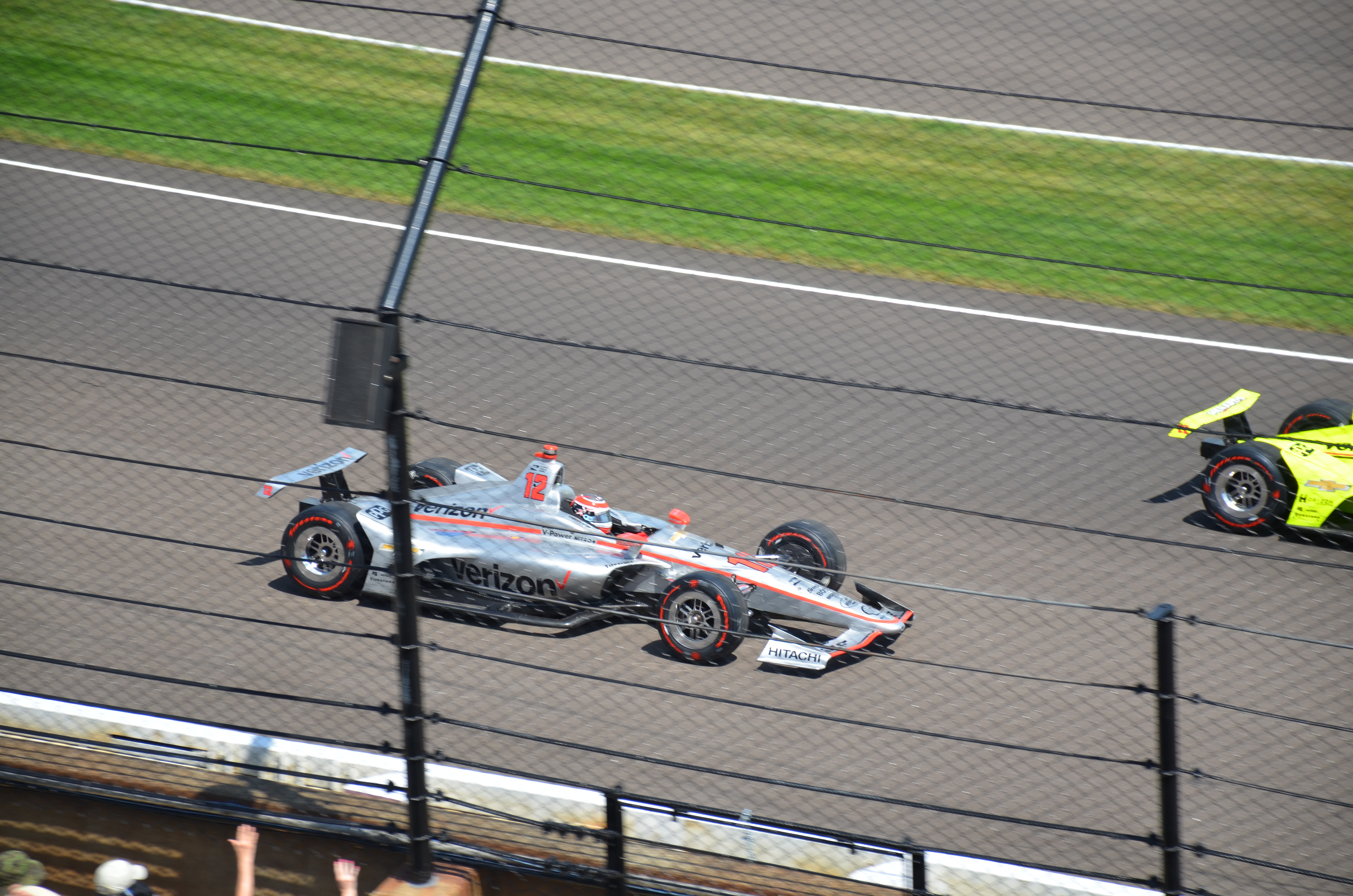
Will Power

Shortly after halfway, rookie Kyle Kaiser dropped out of the race with mechanical issues, the only rookie to retire from the race. Up front, Power held a commanding 4.7 second lead of Carpenter, but the gap would close back down to just over a second when Stefan Wilson managed to un-lap himself on lap 121. By lap 127, pit stops once again came, with Power maintaining his place ahead of Carpenter. On lap 138, the fourth caution period of the day came, when Sébastien Bourdais lost control of his car coming off of turn 3 while running close behind Alexander Rossi. Bourdais attempted to save his car in the north short-chute, but spun around completely and impacted the turn 4 wall. With the field bunched back up again and drivers off-sequence pitting during the yellow, the running order ran Power, Carpenter, Pagenaud, Ryan Hunter-Reay, and Castroneves.

The restart came at lap 145, with Power quickly pulling away. Green flag conditions lasted for less than a lap, as coming off of turn 4, Castroneves spun, slid across the track and impacted the inside wall before sliding to a halt on the pit lane. The caution simplified pit stop strategy for most, as it ensured that only one more stop would be necessary during the race.

Racing once again resumed on lap 154 with Power once again opening up his lead. Further back, Rossi, who had started the race from the back row, made his way into the lead group with a daring outside pass through turn 1 and 2 to move him into third ahead of Pagenaud and Hunter-Reay. Caution flew just as quickly as the previous run, though, this time for Sage Karam losing control of his car at the exit of turn 4 and making contact with the outside wall, which ripped the right-rear tire off of Karam's car. During the caution, the front-runners stayed out, while a few drivers, including Oriol Servià, Stefan Wilson, Jack Harvey, and Scott Dixon pitted, hoping to get more caution in the remaining laps to move their way to the top of the field.

Racing resumed again at lap 162, with Power once again opening his lead over Carpenter. The running order for front runners remained largely the same until pit stops between lap 170 and 175. Power retained his advantage over Carpenter, but now six off-sequence cars were ahead of him, with Servià leading the way over Wilson, Harvey and Dixon. By lap 185, Power had managed to move back up into fourth, but on lap 188, the caution that the off-sequence drivers needed finally appeared when Tony Kanaan lost control of his car coming off of turn 2 and impacted the outside wall.

==== Finish ====
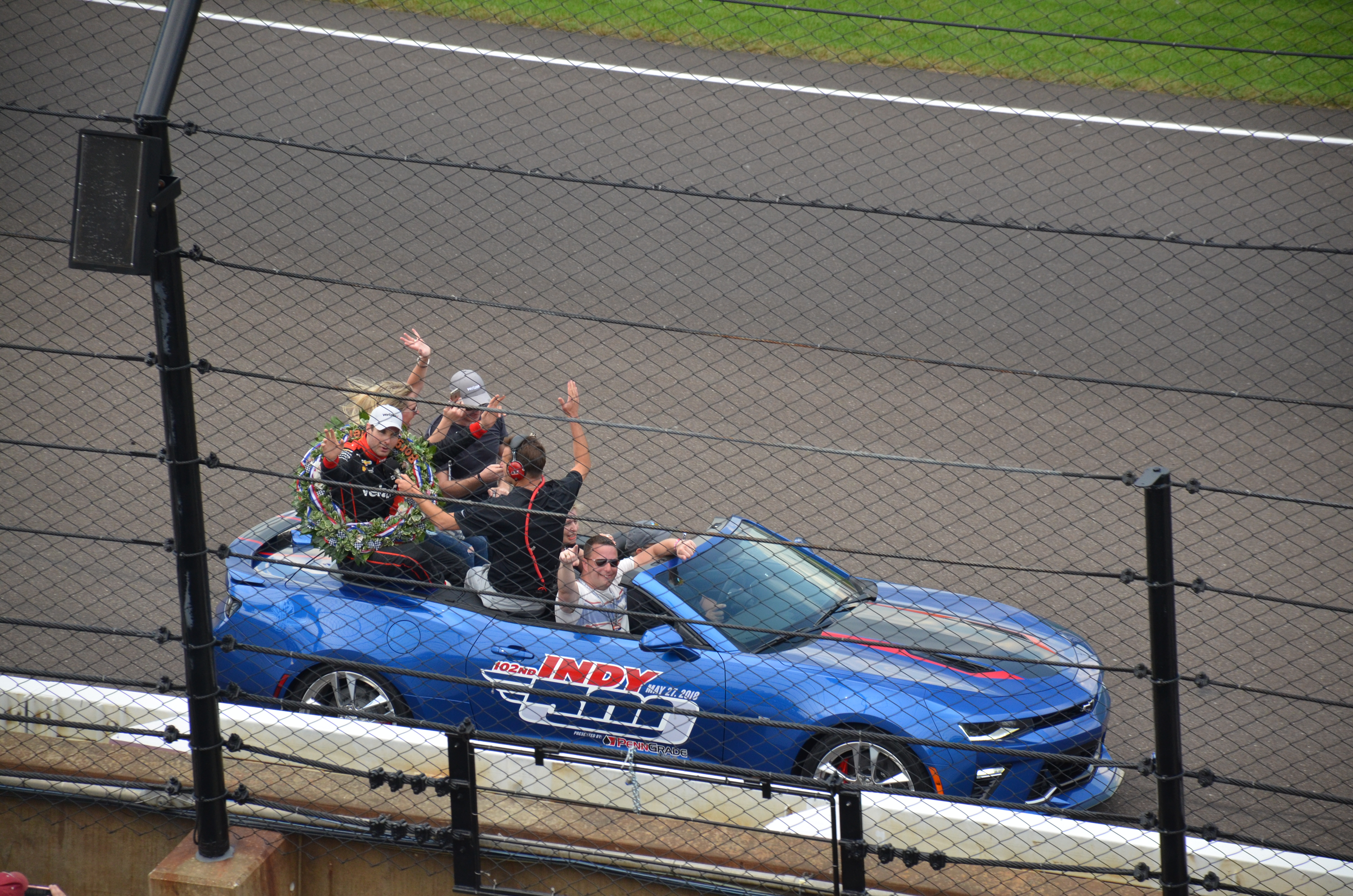
Will Power celebrates on his victory lap.

The track went green on lap 194. Race leader Servià was immediately being passed by both Wilson and Harvey; both drivers were critical on fuel, and were gambling on a late caution to conserve enough fuel for victory. Power moved into third on the next lap and began setting his sights on the other two ahead. Power was suddenly promoted to first with only four laps left when both Wilson and Harvey dived into pit lane for fuel. The next lap, Servià pitted from second, leaving Power with an over 2 second advantage over Carpenter. With a large lead, Power was able to cruise to victory, securing his first victory at the race and becoming the first Australian to take victory in the 500. It was also Roger Penske's 17th Indy 500 victory as a car owner. For his victory, Power took away $2.52 million. Rookie of the year honors went to Robert Wickens, who led two laps en route to a ninth-place finish.

== Box score ==
Finish	No.	Driver	Team	Chassis	Engine	Laps	Status	Pit Stops	Grid	Pts.^{1}
1	12	(Australia) Will Power	Team Penske	Dallara UAK18	Chevrolet	200	166.935 mph	5	3	108
2	20	(United States) Ed Carpenter	Ed Carpenter Racing	Dallara UAK18	Chevrolet	200	+3.1589	5	1	92
3	9	(New Zealand) Scott Dixon W	Chip Ganassi Racing	Dallara UAK18	Honda	200	+4.5928	5	9	71
4	27	(United States) Alexander Rossi W	Andretti Autosport	Dallara UAK18	Honda	200	+5.2237	5	32	65
5	28	(United States) Ryan Hunter-Reay W	Andretti Autosport	Dallara UAK18	Honda	200	+6.7187	5	14	61
6	22	(France) Simon Pagenaud	Team Penske	Dallara UAK18	Chevrolet	200	+7.2357	5	2	65
7	29	(Colombia) Carlos Muñoz	Andretti Autosport	Dallara UAK18	Honda	200	+7.8377	6	21	53
8	1	(United States) Josef Newgarden	Team Penske	Dallara UAK18	Chevrolet	200	+8.6917	6	4	55
9	6	(Canada) Robert Wickens R	Schmidt Peterson Motorsports	Dallara UAK18	Honda	200	+9.3112	7	18	45
10	15	(United States) Graham Rahal	Rahal Letterman Lanigan Racing	Dallara UAK18	Honda	200	+11.3368	6	30	41
11	66	(United States) J. R. Hildebrand	Dreyer & Reinbold Racing	Dallara UAK18	Chevrolet	200	+12.7354	6	27	38
12	98	(United States) Marco Andretti	Andretti Herta Autosport with Curb-Agajanian	Dallara UAK18	Honda	200	+14.0745	5	12	36
13	4	(Brazil) Matheus Leist R	A. J. Foyt Enterprises	Dallara UAK18	Chevrolet	200	+14.7798	5	11	34
14	88	(Colombia) Gabby Chaves	Harding Racing	Dallara UAK18	Chevrolet	200	+15.1173	8	22	32
15	25	(United Kingdom) Stefan Wilson	Andretti Autosport	Dallara UAK18	Honda	200	+33.6747	7	23	31
16	60	(United Kingdom) Jack Harvey	Meyer Shank Racing with Schmidt Peterson	Dallara UAK18	Honda	200	+34.7970	6	31	28
17	64	(Spain) Oriol Servià	Scuderia Corsa with RLL	Dallara UAK18	Honda	200	+38.2325	6	26	27
18	23	(United States) Charlie Kimball	Carlin	Dallara UAK18	Chevrolet	200	+41.5146	8	15	24
19	19	(Canada) Zachary Claman DeMelo R	Dale Coyne Racing	Dallara UAK18	Honda	199	-1 Lap	6	13	23
20	21	(United States) Spencer Pigot	Ed Carpenter Racing	Dallara UAK18	Chevrolet	199	-1 Lap	8	6	25
21	17	(United States) Conor Daly	Dale Coyne Racing dba Thom Burns Racing	Dallara UAK18	Honda	199	-1 Lap	9	33	18
22	59	(United Kingdom) Max Chilton	Carlin	Dallara UAK18	Chevrolet	198	-2 Laps	10	20	16
23	26	(United States) Zach Veach	Andretti Autosport	Dallara UAK18	Honda	198	-2 Laps	10	25	14
24	7	(United Kingdom) Jay Howard	Schmidt Peterson Motorsports/AFS Racing	Dallara UAK18	Honda	193	-7 Laps	10	28	12
25	14	(Brazil) Tony Kanaan W	A. J. Foyt Enterprises	Dallara UAK18	Chevrolet	187	Crash	7	10	11
26	24	(United States) Sage Karam	Dreyer & Reinbold Racing	Dallara UAK18	Chevrolet	154	Crash	4	24	10
27	3	(Brazil) Hélio Castroneves W	Team Penske	Dallara UAK18	Chevrolet	145	Crash	4	8	12
28	18	(France) Sébastien Bourdais	Dale Coyne Racing with Vasser-Sullivan	Dallara UAK18	Honda	137	Crash	4	5	16
29	32	(United States) Kyle Kaiser R	Juncos Racing	Dallara UAK18	Chevrolet	110	Mechanical	6	17	10
30	13	(United States) Danica Patrick	Ed Carpenter Racing	Dallara UAK18	Chevrolet	67	Crash	2	7	13
31	10	(United Arab Emirates) Ed Jones	Chip Ganassi Racing	Dallara UAK18	Honda	57	Crash	2	29	10
32	30	(Japan) Takuma Sato W	Rahal Letterman Lanigan Racing	Dallara UAK18	Honda	46	Contact	1	16	10
33	33	(Australia) James Davison	A. J. Foyt Enterprises with Byrd/Hollinger/Belardi	Dallara UAK18	Chevrolet	45	Contact	1	19	10
OFFICIAL BOX SCORE

W Former Indianapolis 500 winner

R Indianapolis 500 Rookie

All entrants utilized Firestone tires.

^{1} Points include qualification points from Time Trials, 1 point for leading a lap, and 2 points for most laps led.

=== Race statistics ===
Lap Leaders
Laps	Leader
1–30	Ed Carpenter
31	Josef Newgarden
32–34	Spencer Pigot
35–50	Ed Carpenter
51–55	Zachary Claman DeMelo
56–62	Ed Carpenter
63–64	Tony Kanaan
65–72	Ed Carpenter
73–89	Tony Kanaan
90–91	Ed Carpenter
92–94	Will Power
95	Oriol Servia
96	Sebastien Bourdais
97–105	Graham Rahal
106–107	Zachary Claman DeMelo
108–128	Will Power
129	Ryan Hunter-Reay
130–132	Sebastien Bourdais
133–134	Josef Newgarden
135–137	Graham Rahal
138–140	Carlos Munoz
141–170	Will Power
171–172	Ed Carpenter
173	Alexander Rossi
174	Simon Pagenaud
175	Carlos Munoz
176–177	Oriol Servia
178–179	Robert Wickens
180–192	Oriol Servia
193–195	Stefan Wilson
196–200	Will Power

Total laps led
Driver	Laps
Ed Carpenter	62
Will Power	59
Tony Kanaan	22
Oriol Servia	16
Graham Rahal	12
Zachary Claman DeMelo	7
Sebastien Bourdais	4
Carlos Munoz	4
Stefan Wilson	3
Spencer Pigot	3
Josef Newgarden	3
Robert Wickens	2
Alexander Rossi	1
Simon Pagenaud	1
Ryan Hunter-Reay	1

Cautions: 7 for 41 laps
Laps	Reason
48–54	Davison, Sato crash in turn 3
58–62	Ed Jones crash in turn 2
68–74	Danica Patrick crash in turn 2
139–144	Sébastien Bourdais crash in turn 4
146–152	Hélio Castroneves crash in turn 4
154–160	Sage Karam crash in turn 4
189–192	Tony Kanaan crash in turn 2

== Championship standings after the race ==
Drivers' Championship standings

	Pos	Driver	Points
6	1	(Australia) Will Power	243
	2	(United States) Alexander Rossi	241
2	3	(United States) Josef Newgarden	233
	4	(New Zealand) Scott Dixon	218
4	5	(United States) Ryan Hunter-Reay	186

Manufacturer standings

Pos	Manufacturer	Points
1	(Japan) Honda	481
2	(United States) Chevrolet	448

- Note: Only the top five positions are included.

== Broadcasting ==
=== Television ===
For the 54th and last straight year, the race was televised in the United States by ABC. NBC Sports announced in March 2018 that it had acquired the broadcast television rights to the IndyCar Series beginning in 2019 under a three-year deal (complementing the current cable rightsholder NBCSN), with a package of races on NBC (including the 500) replacing the existing package of races on ABC. It ended a relationship between the race and ABC dating back to 1965.

In the United States, the 2018 Indianapolis 500 was the least-watched edition of the race since the inception of live flag-to-flag coverage, with a 3.4 overnight rating (in comparison to the 3.6 rating it received in 2017).

Carb Day, the final practice session, along with the Pit Stop Challenge and Freedom 100, were carried on NBCSN. The booth announcers for NBCSN were Kevin Lee, Townsend Bell and Paul Tracy. The pit reporters were Marty Snider, Jon Beekhuis, Katie Hargitt, and Robin Miller. Lee was joined in the booth by Anders Krohn and Kyle Kaiser for the Freedom 100 coverage.

ABC Television
Booth Announcers	Pit/garage reporters
Host: Nicole Briscoe; Announcer: Allen Bestwick; Color: Scott Goodyear; Color: Eddie Cheever	Jerry Punch; Jon Beekhuis; Rick DeBruhl; Marty Smith (pre-race)

=== Radio ===
The race was carried by the Indianapolis Motor Speedway Radio Network. Mark Jaynes served as the chief announcer for the third year. New to the broadcast was driver analyst Anders Krohn, and pit reporter Ryan Myrehn. As had been in three previous years (2010, 2012–13) the turn one position was vacated. It was decided that the chief announcer in the Pagoda had a clear view of turn one, and a separate reporter was not necessary. Jerry Baker, who had been stationed in turn one dating back to 1986, was absent from the crew entirely, and did not take a substitute booth role as he did in 2010, 2012 and 2013. It was the first time Baker was not part of the crew in any on-air role since his first year in 1974.

1070 The Fan broadcast nightly beginning May 7 with Trackside with Curt Cavin and Kevin Lee, followed by Donald Davidson's The Talk of Gasoline Alley.

Indianapolis Motor Speedway Radio Network
Booth Announcers	Turn Reporters	Pit/garage reporters
Chief Announcer: Mark Jaynes; Driver expert: Anders Krohn; Historian: Donald Davidson	Turn 1: not used Turn 2: Nick Yeoman; Turn 3: Jake Query; Turn 4: Chris Denari	Rob Howden; Dave Furst; Ryan Myrehn; Michael Young; Dave Wilson (Garages/Hospital)

Previous race: 2018 IndyCar Grand Prix	IndyCar Series; 2018 season	Next race: 2018 Chevrolet Detroit Grand Prix
Previous race: 2017 Indianapolis 500	Indianapolis 500	Next race: 2019 Indianapolis 500
