= Zachary Claman DeMelo =

Canadian racing driver (born 1998)

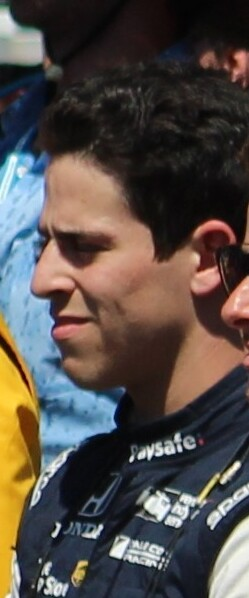
- DeMelo at the 2018 Indianapolis 500.
- Nationality: (Canada) Canadian
- Born: April 20, 1998 (age 28) Montreal, Quebec, Canada

Indy Lights career
- Debut season: 2016
- Categorisation: FIA Silver
- Former teams: Juncos Racing; Carlin Motorsport; Belardi Auto Racing
- Starts: 38
- Wins: 2
- Poles: 1
- Fastest laps: 6
- Best finish: 5th in 2017

Previous series
- 2017-2018 2015 2014: IndyCar Series; MotorSport Vision Formula Three Cup; Formula Renault 2.0 Northern European Cup

Zachary Claman DeMelo (born April 20, 1998) is a Canadian professional race car driver from Montreal, Quebec. He has competed in Formula Renault 2.0, the IndyCar Series and other open-wheel series, most recently competing for Belardi Auto Racing in Indy Lights in 2019.

== Racing career ==
=== Karting and lower formula ===
Claman DeMelo began competing in various regional and national karting events in 2008. In 2010, at the age of twelve, he clinched his first Canadian National Karting Championship as well as his first Eastern Canadian Karting Championship. By the age of sixteen, he had won three Canadian National Karting Championships, five consecutive Eastern Canadian National Championships, and earned a third-place finish at the Rotax Karting World Championships. Claman DeMelo made his car racing debut in the 2014–15 Formula Skip Barber winter series, where he won two of the four races.

In 2015, Claman DeMelo moved to Europe and participated in a handful of races in several Formula Renault 2.0 series, including Formula Renault 2.0 NEC, Formula Renault 2.0 Eurocup, and Formula Renault 2.0 Alps. From there, he moved on to the Invitational class of the MSV F3 Cup, where he claimed a win in all eight races he drove in.

=== Indy Lights ===
In 2016, Claman DeMelo entered Indy Lights as the youngest driver on the grid (at seventeen years old) with defending championship team Juncos Racing. In his rookie campaign, Claman DeMelo put up nine finishes in the top-ten and three finishes in the top-five. In 2017, Claman DeMelo raced for the 2016 defending championship team, Carlin Motorsport. He captured his first series win at Road America and captured a pair of podium finishes in Toronto. He finished fifth in points, just four points behind teammate Matheus Leist in fourth.

Unable to secure a full-time ride in the NTT IndyCar Series, Claman DeMelo chose to return to Indy Lights for the 2019 season, this time with Belardi Auto Racing. After winning the season-opening round at St. Petersburg, the season went south for the team, and budget issues ended Claman DeMelo's season before the Freedom 100.

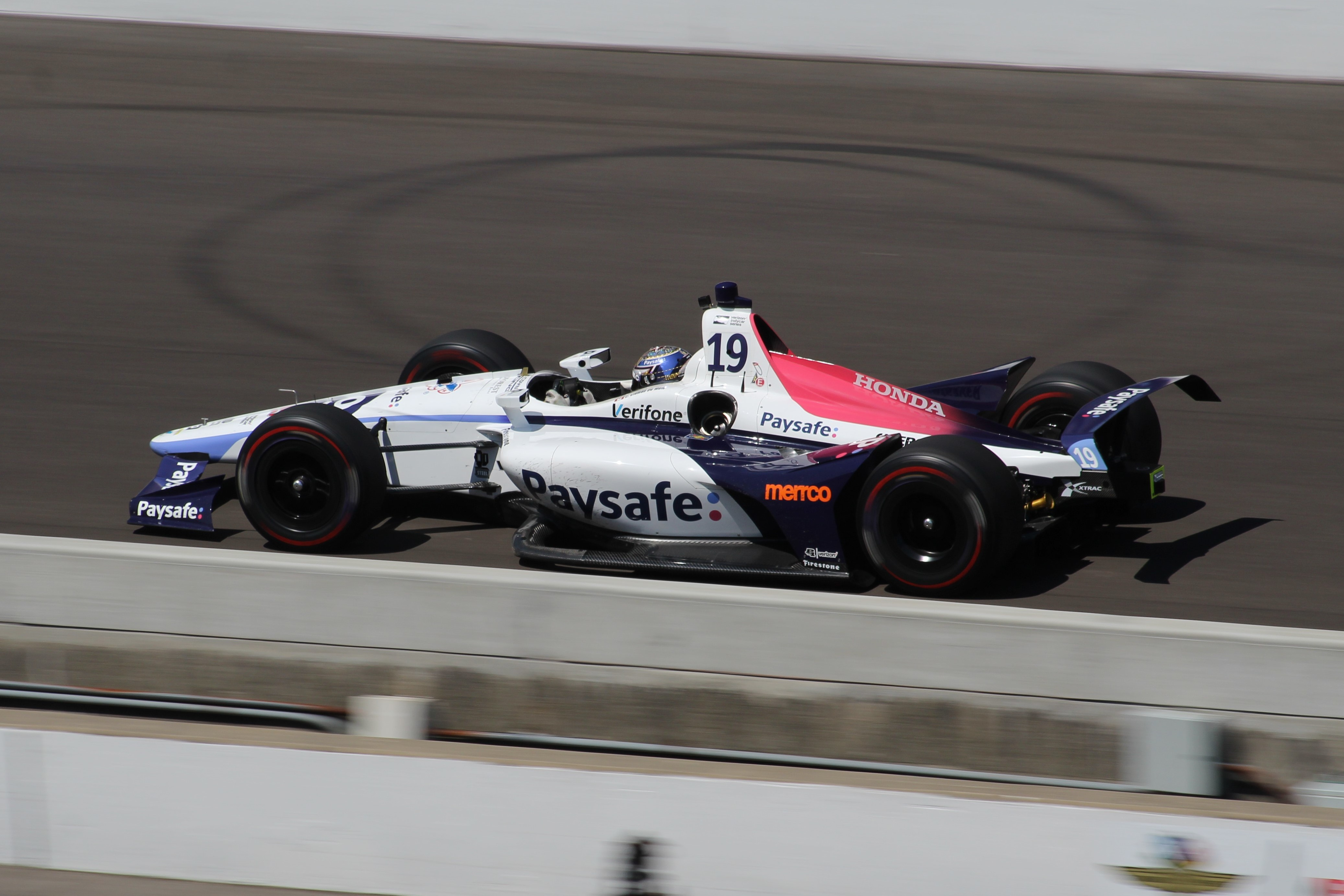
Claman DeMelo driving for Dale Coyne Racing at the 2018 Indianapolis 500

=== IndyCar Series ===
In July 2016, Claman DeMelo participated in an IndyCar Series test with Schmidt Peterson Motorsports. He made his IndyCar debut in the 2017 season finale at Sonoma Raceway with Rahal Letterman Lanigan Racing.

In February 2018, Claman DeMelo was named a part-time driver of the No. 19 Paysafe Honda for Dale Coyne Racing in the 2018 IndyCar Series.

== Personal life ==
One of Claman DeMelo's grandmothers spent time in a Nazi concentration camp. She was freed on a Friday the 13th, and the tattoo numbers added up to 13. He has used number 13 on his racecars during most of his career.

In 2016, Claman DeMelo and his sister launched a shoe brand called ZCD Montreal.

In 2023, Claman DeMelo was assaulted by ice hockey player Daniel Sprong at a nightclub during the Detroit Grand Prix weekend.

== Racing record ==
=== Complete Eurocup Formula Renault 2.0 results ===
(key) (Races in bold indicate pole position; races in italics indicate fastest lap)

Year	Entrant	1	2	3	4	5	6	7	8	9	10	11	12	13	14	15	16	17	DC	Points
2015	Fortec Motorsports	ALC; 1; 24	ALC; 2 Ret	ALC; 3; 18	SPA; 1	SPA; 2	HUN; 1	HUN; 2	SIL; 1	SIL; 2	SIL; 3	NÜR; 1	NÜR; 2	LMS; 1	LMS; 2	JER; 1	JER; 2	JER; 3	NC†	0

† As DeMelo was a guest driver, he was ineligible for points

=== Complete Formula Renault 2.0 NEC results ===
(key) (Races in bold indicate pole position) (Races in italics indicate fastest lap)

Year	Entrant	1	2	3	4	5	6	7	8	9	10	11	12	13	14	15	16	DC	Points
2015	Fortec Motorsports	MNZ; 1; 11	MNZ; 2; 12	SIL; 1; 20	SIL; 2; 19	RBR; 1	RBR; 2	RBR; 3	SPA; 1	SPA; 2	ASS; 1	ASS; 2	NÜR; 1	NÜR; 2	HOC; 1	HOC; 2	HOC; 3	30th	22

=== American open-wheel racing results ===
==== Indy Lights ====
Year	Team	1	2	3	4	5	6	7	8	9	10	11	12	13	14	15	16	17	18	Rank	Points
2016	Juncos Racing	STP; 11	STP; 16	PHX; 11	ALA; 5	ALA; 7	IMS; 13	IMS; 14	INDY; 13	RDA; 5	RDA; 4	IOW; 8	TOR; 13	TOR; 13	MOH; 7	MOH; 7	WGL; 9	LAG; 12	LAG; 7	9th	199
2017	Carlin	STP; 8	STP; 7	ALA; 5	ALA; 14	IMS; 2	IMS; 11	INDY; 6	RDA; 10	RDA; 1	IOW; 6	TOR; 2	TOR; 3	MOH; 5	MOH; 4	GMP; 6	WGL; 6			5th	274
2019	Belardi Auto Racing	**STP**; 1	STP; 2	COA; 7	COA; 10	IMS; 5	IMS; 2	INDY	RDA	RDA	TOR	TOR	MOH	MOH	GTW	POR	POR	LAG	LAG	10th	124

==== IndyCar Series ====
Year	Team	No.	Chassis	Engine	1	2	3	4	5	6	7	8	9	10	11	12	13	14	15	16	17	Rank	Points	Ref
2017	Rahal Letterman Lanigan Racing	13	Dallara DW12	Honda	STP	LBH	ALA	PHX	IMS	INDY	DET	DET	TXS	ROA	IOW	TOR	MOH	POC	GTW	WGL	SNM; 17	31st	26	
2018	Dale Coyne Racing	19	Dallara DW12	Honda	STP; 17	PHX	LBH; 23	ALA; 19	IMS; 12	INDY; 19	DET	DET	TXS; 17	ROA; 21	IOW; 18	TOR; 14	MOH	POC	GTW	POR	SNM	23rd	122	

* Season still in progress.

==== Indianapolis 500 ====
Year	Chassis	Engine	Start	Finish	Team
2018	Dallara	Honda	13	19	Dale Coyne Racing
