= 2022 Bass Pro Shops Night Race =

NASCAR Cup Series race

Race details
- Race 29 of 36 in the 2022 NASCAR Cup Series
- The 2022 Bass Pro Shops Night Race program cover, commemorating the 2021 Food City 300 finish and the post-race alteration between Kevin Harvick and Chase Elliott from last year's race.
- Date: September 17, 2022
- Location: Bristol Motor Speedway in Bristol, Tennessee
- Course: Permanent racing facility
- Course length: .533 miles (.858 km)
- Distance: 500 laps, 266.5 mi (429 km)
- Average speed: 88.286 miles per hour (142.083 km/h)

Pole position
Driver	Aric Almirola	Stewart-Haas Racing
- Time: 14.946

Most laps led
Driver	Chris Buescher	RFK Racing
- Laps: 169

Winner
No. 17	Chris Buescher	RFK Racing

Television in the United States
- Network: USA
- Announcers: Rick Allen, Jeff Burton, Steve Letarte and Dale Earnhardt Jr.

Radio in the United States
- Radio: PRN
- Booth announcers: Doug Rice and Mark Garrow
- Turn announcers: Rob Albright (Backstretch)

The 2022 Bass Pro Shops Night Race was a NASCAR Cup Series race held on September 17, 2022, at Bristol Motor Speedway in Bristol, Tennessee. Contested over 500 laps on the .533-mile (0.858 km) short track, it was the 29th race of the 2022 NASCAR Cup Series season, third race of the Playoffs and final race of the Round of 16. Chris Buescher of RFK Racing would win the race, while Tyler Reddick, Kyle Busch, Austin Dillon, and Kevin Harvick would be eliminated from the playoffs.

== Report ==
=== Background ===
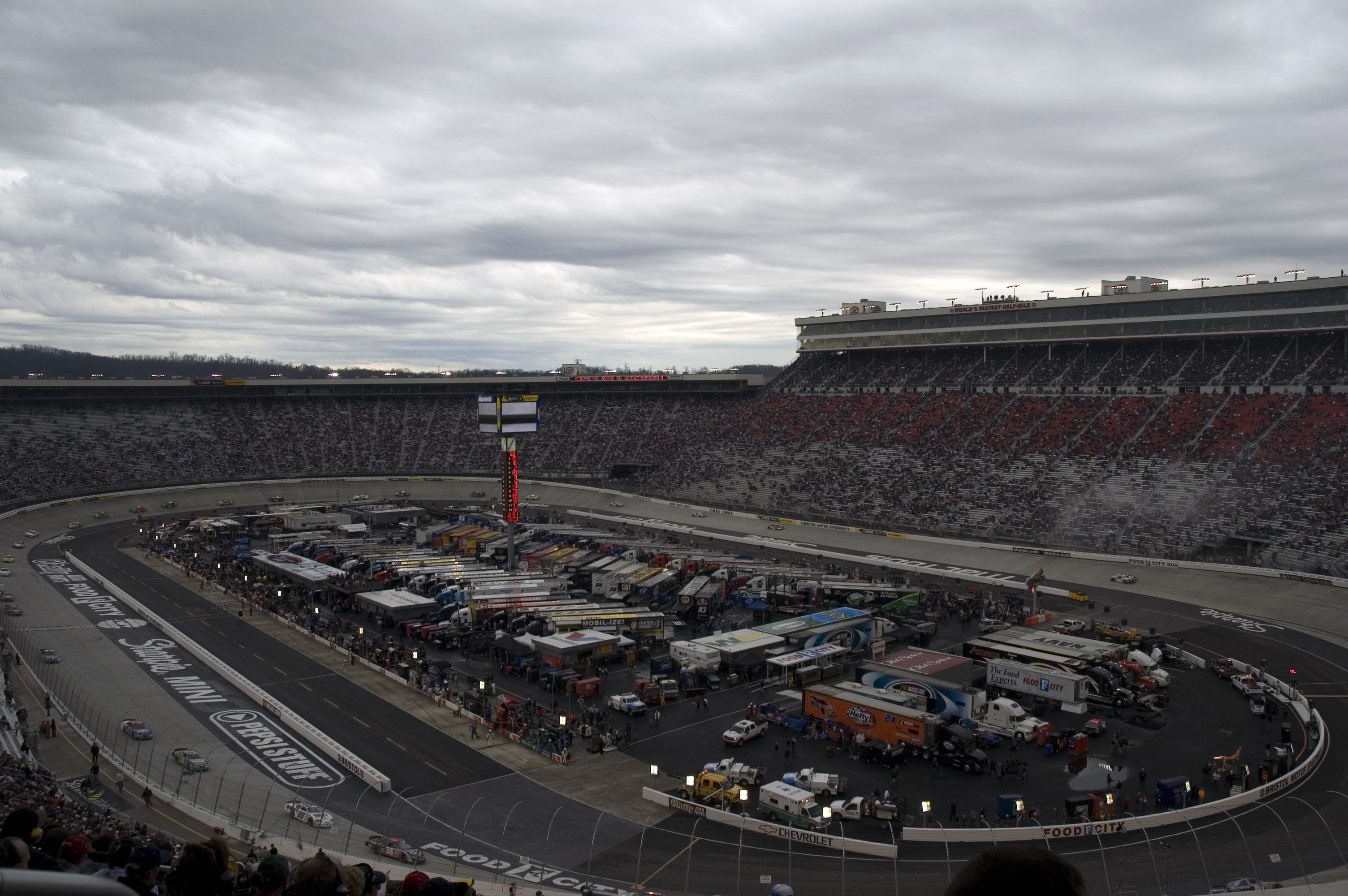
Bristol Motor Speedway, the track where the race was held.

The Bristol Motor Speedway, formerly known as Bristol International Raceway and Bristol Raceway, is a NASCAR short track venue located in Bristol, Tennessee. Constructed in 1960, it held its first NASCAR race on July 30, 1961. Despite its short length, Bristol is among the most popular tracks on the NASCAR schedule because of its distinct features, which include extraordinarily steep banking, an all concrete surface, two pit roads, and stadium-like seating. It has also been named one of the loudest NASCAR tracks.

==== Entry list ====
- (R) denotes rookie driver.
- (i) denotes driver who is ineligible for series driver points.

No.	Driver	Team	Manufacturer
1	Ross Chastain	Trackhouse Racing Team	Chevrolet
2	Austin Cindric (R)	Team Penske	Ford
3	Austin Dillon	Richard Childress Racing	Chevrolet
4	Kevin Harvick	Stewart-Haas Racing	Ford
5	Kyle Larson	Hendrick Motorsports	Chevrolet
6	Brad Keselowski	RFK Racing	Ford
7	Corey LaJoie	Spire Motorsports	Chevrolet
8	Tyler Reddick	Richard Childress Racing	Chevrolet
9	Chase Elliott	Hendrick Motorsports	Chevrolet
10	Aric Almirola	Stewart-Haas Racing	Ford
11	Denny Hamlin	Joe Gibbs Racing	Toyota
12	Ryan Blaney	Team Penske	Ford
14	Chase Briscoe	Stewart-Haas Racing	Ford
15	J. J. Yeley (i)	Rick Ware Racing	Ford
16	A. J. Allmendinger (i)	Kaulig Racing	Chevrolet
17	Chris Buescher	RFK Racing	Ford
18	Kyle Busch	Joe Gibbs Racing	Toyota
19	Martin Truex Jr.	Joe Gibbs Racing	Toyota
20	Christopher Bell	Joe Gibbs Racing	Toyota
21	Harrison Burton (R)	Wood Brothers Racing	Ford
22	Joey Logano	Team Penske	Ford
23	Ty Gibbs (i)	23XI Racing	Toyota
24	William Byron	Hendrick Motorsports	Chevrolet
31	Justin Haley	Kaulig Racing	Chevrolet
34	Michael McDowell	Front Row Motorsports	Ford
38	Todd Gilliland (R)	Front Row Motorsports	Ford
41	Cole Custer	Stewart-Haas Racing	Ford
42	Ty Dillon	Petty GMS Motorsports	Chevrolet
43	Erik Jones	Petty GMS Motorsports	Chevrolet
45	Bubba Wallace	23XI Racing	Toyota
47	Ricky Stenhouse Jr.	JTG Daugherty Racing	Chevrolet
48	Alex Bowman	Hendrick Motorsports	Chevrolet
51	Cody Ware	Rick Ware Racing	Ford
77	Josh Bilicki (i)	Spire Motorsports	Chevrolet
78	B. J. McLeod (i)	Live Fast Motorsports	Ford
99	Daniel Suárez	Trackhouse Racing Team	Chevrolet
Official entry list

== Practice ==
Denny Hamlin was the fastest in the practice session with a time of 15.247 seconds and a speed of 125.848 mph (202.533 km/h).

=== Practice results ===
Pos	No.	Driver	Team	Manufacturer	Time	Speed
1	11	Denny Hamlin	Joe Gibbs Racing	Toyota	15.247	125.848
2	2	Austin Cindric (R)	Team Penske	Ford	15.347	125.028
3	22	Joey Logano	Team Penske	Ford	15.355	124.963
Official practice results

== Qualifying ==
Aric Almirola scored the pole for the race with a time of 14.946 and a speed of 128.382 mph (206.611 km/h).

=== Qualifying results ===
Pos	No.	Driver	Team	Manufacturer	R1	R2
1	10	Aric Almirola	Stewart-Haas Racing	Ford	15.134	14.946
2	14	Chase Briscoe	Stewart-Haas Racing	Ford	14.944	14.968
3	48	Alex Bowman	Hendrick Motorsports	Chevrolet	15.081	14.970
4	11	Denny Hamlin	Joe Gibbs Racing	Toyota	15.012	14.972
5	5	Kyle Larson	Hendrick Motorsports	Chevrolet	15.063	15.001
6	12	Ryan Blaney	Team Penske	Ford	15.116	15.008
7	4	Kevin Harvick	Stewart-Haas Racing	Ford	15.044	15.030
8	20	Christopher Bell	Joe Gibbs Racing	Toyota	15.140	15.057
9	2	Austin Cindric (R)	Team Penske	Ford	15.000	15.078
10	6	Brad Keselowski	RFK Racing	Ford	15.038	15.083
11	41	Cole Custer	Stewart-Haas Racing	Ford	15.047	—
12	1	Ross Chastain	Trackhouse Racing Team	Chevrolet	15.051	—
13	16	A. J. Allmendinger (i)	Kaulig Racing	Chevrolet	15.092	—
14	45	Bubba Wallace	23XI Racing	Toyota	15.096	—
15	22	Joey Logano	Team Penske	Ford	15.125	—
16	24	William Byron	Hendrick Motorsports	Chevrolet	15.153	—
17	8	Tyler Reddick	Richard Childress Racing	Chevrolet	15.159	—
18	34	Michael McDowell	Front Row Motorsports	Ford	15.176	—
19	31	Justin Haley	Kaulig Racing	Chevrolet	15.182	—
20	17	Chris Buescher	RFK Racing	Ford	15.184	—
21	18	Kyle Busch	Joe Gibbs Racing	Toyota	15.188	—
22	19	Martin Truex Jr.	Joe Gibbs Racing	Toyota	15.220	—
23	9	Chase Elliott	Hendrick Motorsports	Chevrolet	15.248	—
24	43	Erik Jones	Petty GMS Motorsports	Chevrolet	15.265	—
25	23	Ty Gibbs (i)	23XI Racing	Toyota	15.266	—
26	47	Ricky Stenhouse Jr.	JTG Daugherty Racing	Chevrolet	15.379	—
27	21	Harrison Burton (R)	Wood Brothers Racing	Ford	15.382	—
28	3	Austin Dillon	Richard Childress Racing	Chevrolet	15.388	—
29	99	Daniel Suárez	Trackhouse Racing Team	Chevrolet	15.390	—
30	38	Todd Gilliland (R)	Front Row Motorsports	Ford	15.450	—
31	7	Corey LaJoie	Spire Motorsports	Chevrolet	15.451	—
32	51	Cody Ware	Rick Ware Racing	Ford	15.460	—
33	78	B. J. McLeod (i)	Live Fast Motorsports	Ford	15.501	—
34	42	Ty Dillon	Petty GMS Motorsports	Chevrolet	15.604	—
35	77	Landon Cassill (i)	Spire Motorsports	Chevrolet	15.684	—
36	15	J. J. Yeley (i)	Rick Ware Racing	Ford	15.722	—
Official qualifying results

== Race ==
=== Stage Results ===
Stage One Laps: 125

Pos	No	Driver	Team	Manufacturer	Points
1	6	Brad Keselowski	RFK Racing	Ford	10
2	20	Christopher Bell	Joe Gibbs Racing	Toyota	9
3	18	Kyle Busch	Joe Gibbs Racing	Toyota	8
4	14	Chase Briscoe	Stewart-Haas Racing	Ford	7
5	5	Kyle Larson	Hendrick Motorsports	Chevrolet	6
6	48	Alex Bowman	Hendrick Motorsports	Chevrolet	5
7	17	Chris Buescher	RFK Racing	Ford	4
8	8	Tyler Reddick	Richard Childress Racing	Chevrolet	3
9	24	William Byron	Hendrick Motorsports	Chevrolet	2
10	19	Martin Truex Jr.	Joe Gibbs Racing	Toyota	1
Official stage one results

Stage Two Laps: 125

Pos	No	Driver	Team	Manufacturer	Points
1	20	Christopher Bell	Joe Gibbs Racing	Toyota	10
2	1	Ross Chastain	Trackhouse Racing Team	Chevrolet	9
3	14	Chase Briscoe	Stewart-Haas Racing	Ford	8
4	9	Chase Elliott	Hendrick Motorsports	Chevrolet	7
5	18	Kyle Busch	Joe Gibbs Racing	Toyota	6
6	48	Alex Bowman	Hendrick Motorsports	Chevrolet	5
7	24	William Byron	Hendrick Motorsports	Chevrolet	4
8	3	Austin Dillon	Richard Childress Racing	Chevrolet	3
9	5	Kyle Larson	Hendrick Motorsports	Chevrolet	2
10	4	Kevin Harvick	Stewart-Haas Racing	Ford	1
Official stage two results

=== Final Stage Results ===
Stage Three Laps: 250

Pos	Grid	No	Driver	Team	Manufacturer	Laps	Points
1	20	17	Chris Buescher	RFK Racing	Ford	500	44
2	23	9	Chase Elliott	Hendrick Motorsports	Chevrolet	500	42
3	16	24	William Byron	Hendrick Motorsports	Chevrolet	500	40
4	8	20	Christopher Bell	Joe Gibbs Racing	Toyota	500	52
5	5	5	Kyle Larson	Hendrick Motorsports	Chevrolet	500	40
6	12	1	Ross Chastain	Trackhouse Racing Team	Chevrolet	500	40
7	13	16	A. J. Allmendinger (i)	Kaulig Racing	Chevrolet	500	0
8	11	41	Cole Custer	Stewart-Haas Racing	Ford	500	29
9	4	11	Denny Hamlin	Joe Gibbs Racing	Toyota	500	28
10	7	4	Kevin Harvick	Stewart-Haas Racing	Ford	500	28
11	18	34	Michael McDowell	Front Row Motorsports	Ford	500	26
12	19	31	Justin Haley	Kaulig Racing	Chevrolet	500	25
13	10	6	Brad Keselowski	RFK Racing	Ford	499	34
14	2	14	Chase Briscoe	Stewart-Haas Racing	Ford	498	38
15	31	7	Corey LaJoie	Spire Motorsports	Chevrolet	497	22
16	27	21	Harrison Burton (R)	Wood Brothers Racing	Ford	497	21
17	32	51	Cody Ware	Rick Ware Racing	Ford	497	20
18	30	38	Todd Gilliland (R)	Front Row Motorsports	Ford	496	19
19	29	99	Daniel Suárez	Trackhouse Racing Team	Chevrolet	494	18
20	9	2	Austin Cindric (R)	Team Penske	Ford	493	17
21	24	43	Erik Jones	Petty GMS Motorsports	Chevrolet	492	16
22	35	77	Landon Cassill (i)	Spire Motorsports	Chevrolet	492	0
23	36	15	J. J. Yeley (i)	Rick Ware Racing	Ford	491	0
24	33	78	B. J. McLeod (i)	Live Fast Motorsports	Ford	491	0
25	17	8	Tyler Reddick	Richard Childress Racing	Chevrolet	469	15
26	34	42	Ty Dillon	Petty GMS Motorsports	Chevrolet	457	11
27	15	22	Joey Logano	Team Penske	Ford	437	10
28	1	10	Aric Almirola	Stewart-Haas Racing	Ford	418	9
29	14	45	Bubba Wallace	23XI Racing	Toyota	408	8
30	6	12	Ryan Blaney	Team Penske	Ford	338	7
31	28	3	Austin Dillon	Richard Childress Racing	Chevrolet	279	9
32	3	48	Alex Bowman	Hendrick Motorsports	Chevrolet	277	15
33	26	47	Ricky Stenhouse Jr.	JTG Daugherty Racing	Chevrolet	276	4
34	21	18	Kyle Busch	Joe Gibbs Racing	Toyota	269	17
35	25	23	Ty Gibbs (i)	23XI Racing	Toyota	265	0
36	22	19	Martin Truex Jr.	Joe Gibbs Racing	Toyota	198	2
Official race results

=== Race statistics ===
- Lead changes: 12 among 6 different drivers
- Cautions/Laps: 11 for 80
- Red flags: 0
- Time of race: 3 hours, 1 minute and 7 seconds
- Average speed: 88.286 miles per hour (142.083 km/h)

== Media ==
=== Television ===
USA covered the race on the television side. Rick Allen, 2008 Food City 500 winner Jeff Burton, Steve Letarte and Dale Earnhardt Jr. called the race from the broadcast booth. Dave Burns, Kim Coon, Marty Snider, and Dillon Welch handled the pit road duties from pit lane.

USA
Booth announcers	Pit reporters
Lap-by-lap: Rick Allen; Color-commentator: Jeff Burton; Color-commentator: Steve Letarte; Color-commentator: Dale Earnhardt Jr.	Dave Burns; Kim Coon; Marty Snider; Dillon Welch

=== Radio ===
PRN had the radio call for the race, which was also simulcast on Sirius XM NASCAR Radio. Doug Rice and Mark Garrow called the race from the booth when the field races down the frontstretch. Rob Albright called the race when the field races down the backstretch. Brad Gillie, Brett McMillan, Alan Cavanna, and Wendy Venturini handled the duties on pit lane.

PRN
Booth announcers	Turn announcers	Pit reporters
Lead announcer: Doug Rice; Announcer: Mark Garrow	Backstretch: Rob Albright	Brad Gillie; Brett McMillan; Alan Cavanna; Wendy Venturini

== Standings after the race ==
Drivers' Championship standings

	Pos	Driver	Points
6	1	Chase Elliott	3,040
2	2	Joey Logano	3,025 (–15)
6	3	Ross Chastain	3,020 (–20)
4	4	Kyle Larson	3,019 (–21)
3	5	William Byron	3,015 (–25)
3	6	Denny Hamlin	3,013 (–27)
6	7	Christopher Bell	3,013 (–27)
3	8	Ryan Blaney	3,013 (–27)
6	9	Chase Briscoe	3,009 (–31)
4	10	Alex Bowman	3,007 (–33)
1	11	Daniel Suárez	3,007 (–33)
	12	Austin Cindric	3,006 (–34)
2	13	Tyler Reddick	2,067 (–973)
1	14	Kyle Busch	2,067 (–973)
1	15	Austin Dillon	2,058 (–982)
	16	Kevin Harvick	2,045 (–995)
Official driver's standings

Manufacturers' Championship standings

Pos	Manufacturer	Points
1	Chevrolet	1,067
2	Ford	999 (–68)
3	Toyota	954 (–113)

- Note: Only the first 16 positions are included for the driver standings.

Previous race: 2022 Hollywood Casino 400	NASCAR Cup Series; 2022 season	Next race: 2022 Autotrader EchoPark Automotive 500
