= 2025 South Point 400 =

NASCAR Cup Series race

Race details
- Race 33 of 36 in the 2025 NASCAR Cup Series
- Date: October 12, 2025
- Location: Las Vegas Motor Speedway in Las Vegas, Nevada
- Course: Permanent racing facility
- Course length: 1.5 miles (2.4 km)
- Distance: 267 laps, 400.5 mi (640.8 km)
- Average speed: 137.131 miles per hour (220.691 km/h)

Pole position
Driver	Denny Hamlin	Joe Gibbs Racing
- Time: 29.213

Most laps led
Driver	Kyle Larson	Hendrick Motorsports
- Laps: 129

Fastest lap
Driver	Chase Briscoe	Joe Gibbs Racing
- Time: 29.394

Winner
No. 11	Denny Hamlin	Joe Gibbs Racing

Television in the United States
- Network: USA
- Announcers: Leigh Diffey, Jeff Burton, and Steve Letarte.
- Nielsen ratings: 0.84 (1.717 million)

Radio in the United States
- Radio: PRN
- Booth announcers: Brad Gillie and Mark Garrow
- Turn announcers: Nick Yeoman (1 & 2) and Pat Patterson (3 & 4)

The 2025 South Point 400 was a NASCAR Cup Series race held on October 12, 2025, at Las Vegas Motor Speedway in Las Vegas, Nevada. Contested over 267 laps on the 1.5 mile (2.4 km) intermediate quad-oval, it was the 33rd race of the 2025 NASCAR Cup Series season, seventh race of the Playoffs, and first race of the Round of 8.

Denny Hamlin won the race. Kyle Larson finished 2nd, and Christopher Bell finished 3rd. Chase Briscoe and Tyler Reddick rounded out the top five, and Joey Logano, Alex Bowman, Kyle Busch, Ryan Preece, and Brad Keselowski rounded out the top ten.

== Report ==
=== Background ===
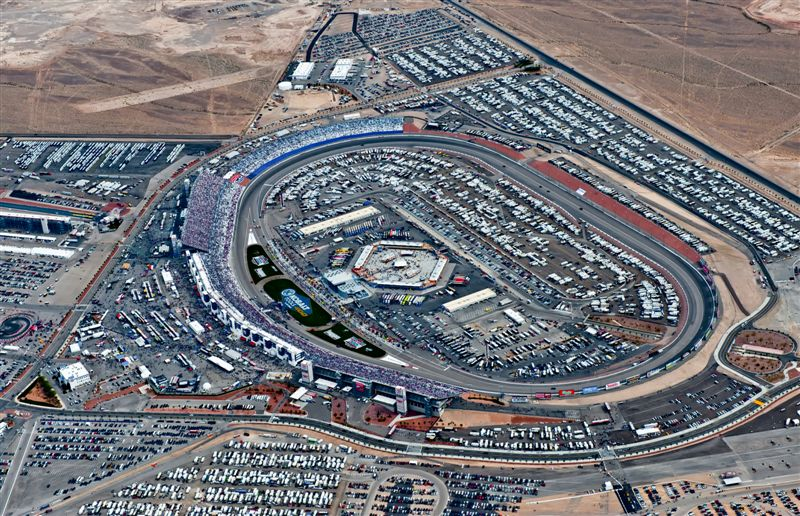
Las Vegas Motor Speedway, the track where the race was held.

Las Vegas Motor Speedway, located in Clark County, Nevada outside the Las Vegas city limits and about 15 miles northeast of the Las Vegas Strip, is a 1,200-acre (490 ha) complex of multiple tracks for motorsports racing. The complex is owned by Speedway Motorsports, Inc., which is headquartered in Charlotte, North Carolina.

==== Entry list ====
- (R) denotes rookie driver.
- (P) denotes playoff driver.
- (i) denotes driver who is ineligible for series driver points.

No.	Driver	Team	Manufacturer
1	Ross Chastain	Trackhouse Racing	Chevrolet
2	Austin Cindric	Team Penske	Ford
3	Austin Dillon	Richard Childress Racing	Chevrolet
4	Noah Gragson	Front Row Motorsports	Ford
5	Kyle Larson (P)	Hendrick Motorsports	Chevrolet
6	Brad Keselowski	RFK Racing	Ford
7	Justin Haley	Spire Motorsports	Chevrolet
8	Kyle Busch	Richard Childress Racing	Chevrolet
9	Chase Elliott (P)	Hendrick Motorsports	Chevrolet
10	Ty Dillon	Kaulig Racing	Chevrolet
11	Denny Hamlin (P)	Joe Gibbs Racing	Toyota
12	Ryan Blaney (P)	Team Penske	Ford
16	A. J. Allmendinger	Kaulig Racing	Chevrolet
17	Chris Buescher	RFK Racing	Ford
19	Chase Briscoe (P)	Joe Gibbs Racing	Toyota
20	Christopher Bell (P)	Joe Gibbs Racing	Toyota
21	Josh Berry	Wood Brothers Racing	Ford
22	Joey Logano (P)	Team Penske	Ford
23	Bubba Wallace	23XI Racing	Toyota
24	William Byron (P)	Hendrick Motorsports	Chevrolet
34	Todd Gilliland	Front Row Motorsports	Ford
35	Riley Herbst (R)	23XI Racing	Toyota
38	Zane Smith	Front Row Motorsports	Ford
41	Cole Custer	Haas Factory Team	Ford
42	John Hunter Nemechek	Legacy Motor Club	Toyota
43	Erik Jones	Legacy Motor Club	Toyota
44	J. J. Yeley (i)	NY Racing Team	Chevrolet
45	Tyler Reddick	23XI Racing	Toyota
47	Ricky Stenhouse Jr.	Hyak Motorsports	Chevrolet
48	Alex Bowman	Hendrick Motorsports	Chevrolet
51	Cody Ware	Rick Ware Racing	Ford
54	Ty Gibbs	Joe Gibbs Racing	Toyota
60	Ryan Preece	RFK Racing	Ford
71	Michael McDowell	Spire Motorsports	Chevrolet
77	Carson Hocevar	Spire Motorsports	Chevrolet
78	Katherine Legge	Live Fast Motorsports	Chevrolet
88	Shane van Gisbergen (R)	Trackhouse Racing	Chevrolet
99	Daniel Suárez	Trackhouse Racing	Chevrolet
Official entry list

== Practice ==
Ty Gibbs was the fastest in the practice session with a time of 29.714 seconds and a speed of 181.732 mph (292.469 km/h).

=== Practice results ===
Pos	No.	Driver	Team	Manufacturer	Time	Speed
1	54	Ty Gibbs	Joe Gibbs Racing	Toyota	29.714	181.732
2	24	William Byron (P)	Hendrick Motorsports	Chevrolet	29.806	181.171
3	9	Chase Elliott (P)	Hendrick Motorsports	Chevrolet	29.842	180.953
Official practice results

== Qualifying ==
Denny Hamlin scored the pole for the race with a time of 29.213 and a speed of 184.849 mph (297.486 km/h).

=== Qualifying results ===
Pos	No.	Driver	Team	Manufacturer	Time	Speed
1	11	Denny Hamlin (P)	Joe Gibbs Racing	Toyota	29.213	184.849
2	19	Chase Briscoe (P)	Joe Gibbs Racing	Toyota	29.249	184.622
3	20	Christopher Bell (P)	Joe Gibbs Racing	Toyota	29.255	184.584
4	9	Chase Elliott (P)	Hendrick Motorsports	Chevrolet	29.259	184.559
5	24	William Byron (P)	Hendrick Motorsports	Chevrolet	29.304	184.275
6	5	Kyle Larson (P)	Hendrick Motorsports	Chevrolet	29.328	184.124
7	23	Bubba Wallace	23XI Racing	Toyota	29.401	183.667
8	45	Tyler Reddick	23XI Racing	Toyota	29.413	183.592
9	22	Joey Logano (P)	Team Penske	Ford	29.421	183.542
10	54	Ty Gibbs	Joe Gibbs Racing	Toyota	29.454	183.337
11	17	Chris Buescher	RFK Racing	Ford	29.537	182.822
12	48	Alex Bowman	Hendrick Motorsports	Chevrolet	29.540	182.803
13	88	Shane van Gisbergen (R)	Trackhouse Racing	Chevrolet	29.586	182.519
14	12	Ryan Blaney (P)	Team Penske	Ford	29.592	182.482
15	1	Ross Chastain	Trackhouse Racing	Chevrolet	29.594	182.469
16	60	Ryan Preece	RFK Racing	Ford	29.626	182.272
17	99	Daniel Suárez	Trackhouse Racing	Chevrolet	29.645	182.156
18	71	Michael McDowell	Spire Motorsports	Chevrolet	29.647	182.143
19	43	Erik Jones	Legacy Motor Club	Toyota	29.679	181.947
20	16	A. J. Allmendinger	Kaulig Racing	Chevrolet	29.690	181.879
21	41	Cole Custer	Haas Factory Team	Ford	29.693	181.861
22	77	Carson Hocevar	Spire Motorsports	Chevrolet	29.703	181.800
23	38	Zane Smith	Front Row Motorsports	Ford	29.720	181.696
24	47	Ricky Stenhouse Jr.	Hyak Motorsports	Chevrolet	29.765	181.421
25	3	Austin Dillon	Richard Childress Racing	Chevrolet	29.779	181.336
26	42	John Hunter Nemechek	Legacy Motor Club	Toyota	29.842	180.953
27	7	Justin Haley	Spire Motorsports	Chevrolet	29.846	180.929
28	4	Noah Gragson	Front Row Motorsports	Ford	29.862	180.832
29	21	Josh Berry	Wood Brothers Racing	Ford	29.909	180.548
30	34	Todd Gilliland	Front Row Motorsports	Ford	30.022	179.868
31	2	Austin Cindric	Team Penske	Ford	30.089	179.468
32	8	Kyle Busch	Richard Childress Racing	Chevrolet	30.090	179.462
33	35	Riley Herbst (R)	23XI Racing	Toyota	30.147	179.122
34	6	Brad Keselowski	RFK Racing	Ford	30.210	178.749
35	10	Ty Dillon	Kaulig Racing	Chevrolet	30.321	178.094
36	51	Cody Ware	Rick Ware Racing	Ford	30.627	176.315
37	44	J. J. Yeley (i)	NY Racing Team	Chevrolet	30.661	176.120
38	78	Katherine Legge	Live Fast Motorsports	Chevrolet	31.644	170.648
Official qualifying results

== Race ==
=== Race results ===
==== Stage results ====
Stage One Laps: 80

Pos	No	Driver	Team	Manufacturer	Points
1	24	William Byron (P)	Hendrick Motorsports	Chevrolet	10
2	5	Kyle Larson (P)	Hendrick Motorsports	Chevrolet	9
3	19	Chase Briscoe (P)	Joe Gibbs Racing	Toyota	8
4	11	Denny Hamlin (P)	Joe Gibbs Racing	Toyota	7
5	9	Chase Elliott (P)	Hendrick Motorsports	Chevrolet	6
6	23	Bubba Wallace	23XI Racing	Toyota	5
7	20	Christopher Bell (P)	Joe Gibbs Racing	Toyota	4
8	45	Tyler Reddick	23XI Racing	Toyota	3
9	54	Ty Gibbs	Joe Gibbs Racing	Toyota	2
10	22	Joey Logano (P)	Team Penske	Ford	1
Official stage one results

Stage Two Laps: 85

Pos	No	Driver	Team	Manufacturer	Points
1	5	Kyle Larson (P)	Hendrick Motorsports	Chevrolet	10
2	45	Tyler Reddick	23XI Racing	Toyota	9
3	24	William Byron (P)	Hendrick Motorsports	Chevrolet	8
4	11	Denny Hamlin (P)	Joe Gibbs Racing	Toyota	7
5	19	Chase Briscoe (P)	Joe Gibbs Racing	Toyota	6
6	20	Christopher Bell (P)	Joe Gibbs Racing	Toyota	5
7	54	Ty Gibbs	Joe Gibbs Racing	Toyota	4
8	48	Alex Bowman	Hendrick Motorsports	Chevrolet	3
9	22	Joey Logano (P)	Team Penske	Ford	2
10	77	Carson Hocevar	Spire Motorsports	Chevrolet	1
Official stage two results

=== Final Stage results ===
Stage Three Laps: 102

Pos	Grid	No	Driver	Team	Manufacturer	Laps	Points
1	1	11	Denny Hamlin (P)	Joe Gibbs Racing	Toyota	267	54
2	6	5	Kyle Larson (P)	Hendrick Motorsports	Chevrolet	267	54
3	3	20	Christopher Bell (P)	Joe Gibbs Racing	Toyota	267	43
4	2	19	Chase Briscoe (P)	Joe Gibbs Racing	Toyota	267	48
5	8	45	Tyler Reddick	23XI Racing	Toyota	267	44
6	9	22	Joey Logano (P)	Team Penske	Ford	267	34
7	12	48	Alex Bowman	Hendrick Motorsports	Chevrolet	267	33
8	32	8	Kyle Busch	Richard Childress Racing	Chevrolet	267	29
9	16	60	Ryan Preece	RFK Racing	Ford	267	28
10	34	6	Brad Keselowski	RFK Racing	Ford	267	27
11	31	2	Austin Cindric	Team Penske	Ford	267	26
12	11	17	Chris Buescher	RFK Racing	Ford	267	25
13	28	4	Noah Gragson	Front Row Motorsports	Ford	267	24
14	24	47	Ricky Stenhouse Jr.	Hyak Motorsports	Chevrolet	267	23
15	19	43	Erik Jones	Legacy Motor Club	Toyota	267	22
16	18	71	Michael McDowell	Spire Motorsports	Chevrolet	267	21
17	33	35	Riley Herbst (R)	23XI Racing	Toyota	267	20
18	4	9	Chase Elliott (P)	Hendrick Motorsports	Chevrolet	267	25
19	20	16	A. J. Allmendinger	Kaulig Racing	Chevrolet	267	18
20	17	99	Daniel Suárez	Trackhouse Racing	Chevrolet	267	17
21	30	34	Todd Gilliland	Front Row Motorsports	Ford	267	16
22	7	23	Bubba Wallace	23XI Racing	Toyota	267	20
23	15	1	Ross Chastain	Trackhouse Racing	Chevrolet	267	14
24	23	38	Zane Smith	Front Row Motorsports	Ford	267	13
25	25	3	Austin Dillon	Richard Childress Racing	Chevrolet	267	12
26	29	21	Josh Berry	Wood Brothers Racing	Ford	266	11
27	27	7	Justin Haley	Spire Motorsports	Chevrolet	266	10
28	21	41	Cole Custer	Haas Factory Team	Ford	266	9
29	26	42	John Hunter Nemechek	Legacy Motor Club	Toyota	265	8
30	37	44	J. J. Yeley (i)	NY Racing Team	Chevrolet	263	0
31	38	78	Katherine Legge	Live Fast Motorsports	Ford	261	6
32	22	77	Carson Hocevar	Spire Motorsports	Chevrolet	252	6
33	13	88	Shane van Gisbergen (R)	Trackhouse Racing	Chevrolet	245	4
34	10	54	Ty Gibbs	Joe Gibbs Racing	Toyota	244	9
35	36	51	Cody Ware	Rick Ware Racing	Ford	243	2
36	5	24	William Byron (P)	Hendrick Motorsports	Chevrolet	237	19
37	35	10	Ty Dillon	Kaulig Racing	Chevrolet	235	1
38	14	12	Ryan Blaney (P)	Team Penske	Ford	71	1
Official race results

=== Race statistics ===
- Lead changes: 21 among 11 different drivers
- Cautions/Laps: 5 for 32
- Red flags: 0
- Time of race: 2 hours, 55 minutes, and 14 seconds
- Average speed: 137.131 miles per hour (220.691 km/h)

== Media ==
=== Television ===
USA covered the race on the television side. Leigh Diffey, Jeff Burton, and Steve Letarte called the race from the broadcast booth. Kim Coon, Marty Snider and Dillon Welch handled the pit road duties from pit lane.

USA
Booth announcers	Pit reporters
Lap-by-lap: Leigh Diffey; Color-commentator: Jeff Burton; Color-commentator: Steve Letarte	Kim Coon; Marty Snider; Dillon Welch

=== Radio ===
PRN covered their final 2025 broadcast, which was also simulcast on Sirius XM NASCAR Radio. Brad Gillie and Mark Garrow covered the action for PRN when the field races down the front straightaway. Nick Yeoman covered the action for PRN from a platform outside of Turns 1 & 2, & Pat Patterson covered the action from a platform outside of Turns 3 & 4 for PRN. Brett McMillan, Heather Debeaux and Wendy Venturini had the call from pit lane for PRN.

PRN
Booth announcers	Turn announcers	Pit reporters
Lead announcer: Brad Gillie; Announcer: Mark Garrow	Turns 1 & 2: Nick Yeoman; Turns 3 & 4: Pat Patterson	Brett McMillan; Heather Debeaux; Wendy Venturini

== Standings after the race ==
Drivers' Championship standings

	Pos	Driver	Points
	1	Denny Hamlin	4,090
1	2	Kyle Larson	4,086 (–4)
2	3	Christopher Bell	4,071 (–19)
3	4	Chase Briscoe	4,066 (–24)
1	5	William Byron	4,051 (–39)
	6	Chase Elliott	4,043 (–47)
1	7	Joey Logano	4,042 (–48)
6	8	Ryan Blaney	4,035 (–55)
	9	Tyler Reddick	2,231 (–1,859)
	10	Bubba Wallace	2,197 (–1,893)
	11	Ross Chastain	2,186 (–1,904)
	12	Shane van Gisbergen	2,146 (–1,944)
	13	Alex Bowman	2,143 (–1,947)
	14	Austin Cindric	2,120 (–1,970)
	15	Austin Dillon	2,104 (–1,986)
	16	Josh Berry	2,089 (–2,001)
Official driver's standings

Manufacturers' Championship standings

Pos	Manufacturer	Points
1	Chevrolet	1,205
2	Toyota	1,180 (–25)
3	Ford	1,100 (–105)

- Note: Only the first 16 positions are included for the driver standings.

Previous race: 2025 Bank of America Roval 400	NASCAR Cup Series; 2025 season	Next race: 2025 YellaWood 500
