= 2025 YellaWood 500 =

NASCAR Cup Series race

Race details
- Race 34 of 36 in the 2025 NASCAR Cup Series
- Date: October 19, 2025
- Location: Talladega Superspeedway in Lincoln, Alabama
- Course: Permanent racing facility
- Course length: 2.66 miles (4.28 km)
- Distance: 193 laps, 513.38 mi (826.204 km)
- Scheduled distance: 188 laps, 500.08 mi (804.8 km)
- Average speed: 149.178 miles per hour (240.079 km/h)

Pole position
Driver	Michael McDowell	Spire Motorsports
- Time: 52.481

Most laps led
Driver	Joey Logano	Team Penske
- Laps: 35

Fastest lap
Driver	Michael McDowell	Spire Motorsports
- Time: 48.704

Winner
No. 19	Chase Briscoe	Joe Gibbs Racing

Television in the United States
- Network: NBC
- Announcers: Leigh Diffey, Jeff Burton, and Steve Letarte.

Radio in the United States
- Radio: MRN
- Booth announcers: Alex Hayden, Kyle Rickey and Todd Gordon
- Turn announcers: Dave Moody (1 & 2), Tim Catalfamo (Backstretch), and Chris Wilner (3 & 4)

The 2025 YellaWood 500 was a NASCAR Cup Series race held on October 19, 2025, at Talladega Superspeedway in Lincoln, Alabama. Contested over 193 laps, extended from 188 laps due to an overtime finish, on the 2.66 mi (4.28 km) asphalt superspeedway, it was the 34th race of the 2025 NASCAR Cup Series season, eighth race of the Playoffs, and second race of the Round of 8.

Chase Briscoe won the race. Todd Gilliland finished 2nd, Gilliland's best career finish, and Ty Gibbs finished 3rd. Bubba Wallace and Cole Custer rounded out the top five, and Carson Hocevar, Tyler Reddick, Christopher Bell, Zane Smith, and Brad Keselowski rounded out the top ten.

== Report ==
=== Background ===
Talladega Superspeedway, the track where the race was held.

Talladega Superspeedway, formerly known as Alabama International Motor Speedway, is a motorsports complex located north of Talladega, Alabama. It is located on the former Anniston Air Force Base in the small city of Lincoln. A tri-oval, the track was constructed in 1969 by the International Speedway Corporation, a business controlled by the France family. Talladega is most known for its steep banking. The track currently hosts NASCAR's Cup Series, Xfinity Series, and Craftsman Truck Series. Talladega is the longest NASCAR oval with a length of 2.66-mile-long (4.28 km) tri-oval like the Daytona International Speedway, which is 2.5-mile-long (4.0 km).

==== Entry list ====
- (R) denotes rookie driver.
- (P) denotes playoff driver.
- (i) denotes driver who is ineligible for series driver points.

No.	Driver	Team	Manufacturer
1	Ross Chastain	Trackhouse Racing	Chevrolet
2	Austin Cindric	Team Penske	Ford
3	Austin Dillon	Richard Childress Racing	Chevrolet
4	Noah Gragson	Front Row Motorsports	Ford
5	Kyle Larson (P)	Hendrick Motorsports	Chevrolet
6	Brad Keselowski	RFK Racing	Ford
7	Justin Haley	Spire Motorsports	Chevrolet
8	Kyle Busch	Richard Childress Racing	Chevrolet
9	Chase Elliott (P)	Hendrick Motorsports	Chevrolet
10	Ty Dillon	Kaulig Racing	Chevrolet
11	Denny Hamlin (P)	Joe Gibbs Racing	Toyota
12	Ryan Blaney (P)	Team Penske	Ford
16	A. J. Allmendinger	Kaulig Racing	Chevrolet
17	Chris Buescher	RFK Racing	Ford
19	Chase Briscoe (P)	Joe Gibbs Racing	Toyota
20	Christopher Bell (P)	Joe Gibbs Racing	Toyota
21	Josh Berry	Wood Brothers Racing	Ford
22	Joey Logano (P)	Team Penske	Ford
23	Bubba Wallace	23XI Racing	Toyota
24	William Byron (P)	Hendrick Motorsports	Chevrolet
33	Austin Hill (i)	Richard Childress Racing	Chevrolet
34	Todd Gilliland	Front Row Motorsports	Ford
35	Riley Herbst (R)	23XI Racing	Toyota
38	Zane Smith	Front Row Motorsports	Ford
41	Cole Custer	Haas Factory Team	Ford
42	John Hunter Nemechek	Legacy Motor Club	Toyota
43	Erik Jones	Legacy Motor Club	Toyota
45	Tyler Reddick	23XI Racing	Toyota
47	Ricky Stenhouse Jr.	Hyak Motorsports	Chevrolet
48	Alex Bowman	Hendrick Motorsports	Chevrolet
51	Cody Ware	Rick Ware Racing	Ford
54	Ty Gibbs	Joe Gibbs Racing	Toyota
60	Ryan Preece	RFK Racing	Ford
62	Anthony Alfredo (i)	Beard Motorsports	Chevrolet
66	Casey Mears	Garage 66	Chevrolet
71	Michael McDowell	Spire Motorsports	Chevrolet
77	Carson Hocevar	Spire Motorsports	Chevrolet
78	B. J. McLeod (i)	Live Fast Motorsports	Chevrolet
88	Shane van Gisbergen (R)	Trackhouse Racing	Chevrolet
99	Daniel Suárez	Trackhouse Racing	Chevrolet
Official entry list

== Qualifying ==
Michael McDowell scored the pole for the race with a time of 52.481 and a speed of 182.466 mph (293.651 km/h).

=== Qualifying results ===
Pos	No.	Driver	Team	Manufacturer	Time	Speed
1	71	Michael McDowell	Spire Motorsports	Chevrolet	52.481	182.466
2	19	Chase Briscoe (P)	Joe Gibbs Racing	Toyota	52.500	182.400
3	8	Kyle Busch	Richard Childress Racing	Chevrolet	52.558	182.199
4	2	Austin Cindric	Team Penske	Ford	52.563	182.181
5	60	Ryan Preece	RFK Racing	Ford	52.582	182.116
6	21	Josh Berry	Wood Brothers Racing	Ford	52.614	182.005
7	20	Christopher Bell (P)	Joe Gibbs Racing	Toyota	52.660	181.846
8	12	Ryan Blaney (P)	Team Penske	Ford	52.679	181.780
9	35	Riley Herbst (R)	23XI Racing	Toyota	52.692	181.735
10	23	Bubba Wallace	23XI Racing	Toyota	52.694	181.728
11	48	Alex Bowman	Hendrick Motorsports	Chevrolet	52.769	181.470
12	41	Cole Custer	Haas Factory Team	Ford	52.773	181.456
13	24	William Byron (P)	Hendrick Motorsports	Chevrolet	52.774	181.453
14	17	Chris Buescher	RFK Racing	Ford	52.802	181.357
15	45	Tyler Reddick	23XI Racing	Toyota	52.810	181.329
16	22	Joey Logano (P)	Team Penske	Ford	52.819	181.298
17	11	Denny Hamlin (P)	Joe Gibbs Racing	Toyota	52.819	181.292
18	54	Ty Gibbs	Joe Gibbs Racing	Toyota	52.854	181.178
19	5	Kyle Larson (P)	Hendrick Motorsports	Chevrolet	52.871	181.120
20	6	Brad Keselowski	RFK Racing	Ford	52.889	181.058
21	3	Austin Dillon	Richard Childress Racing	Chevrolet	52.918	180.959
22	7	Justin Haley	Spire Motorsports	Chevrolet	52.937	180.894
23	38	Zane Smith	Front Row Motorsports	Ford	52.545	180.867
24	1	Ross Chastain	Trackhouse Racing	Chevrolet	52.555	180.833
25	9	Chase Elliott (P)	Hendrick Motorsports	Chevrolet	52.959	180.819
26	99	Daniel Suárez	Trackhouse Racing	Chevrolet	52.981	180.744
27	34	Todd Gilliland	Front Row Motorsports	Ford	52.996	180.693
28	42	John Hunter Nemechek	Legacy Motor Club	Toyota	53.000	180.679
29	10	Ty Dillon	Kaulig Racing	Chevrolet	53.009	180.649
30	43	Erik Jones	Legacy Motor Club	Toyota	53.022	180.604
31	88	Shane van Gisbergen (R)	Trackhouse Racing	Chevrolet	53.098	180.346
32	77	Carson Hocevar	Spire Motorsports	Chevrolet	53.113	180.295
33	33	Austin Hill (i)	Richard Childress Racing	Chevrolet	53.115	180.288
34	16	A. J. Allmendinger	Kaulig Racing	Chevrolet	53.122	180.264
35	51	Cody Ware	Rick Ware Racing	Ford	53.245	179.848
36	4	Noah Gragson	Front Row Motorsports	Ford	53.327	179.571
37	47	Ricky Stenhouse Jr.	Hyak Motorsports	Chevrolet	53.430	179.225
38	62	Anthony Alfredo (i)	Beard Motorsports	Chevrolet	53.483	179.048
39	78	B. J. McLeod (i)	Live Fast Motorsports	Chevrolet	53.632	178.550
40	66	Casey Mears	Garage 66	Ford	53.930	177.564
Official qualifying results

== Race ==
=== Race results ===
==== Stage results ====
Stage One Laps: 60

Pos	No	Driver	Team	Manufacturer	Points
1	54	Ty Gibbs	Joe Gibbs Racing	Toyota	10
2	45	Tyler Reddick	23XI Racing	Toyota	9
3	42	John Hunter Nemechek	Legacy Motor Club	Toyota	8
4	12	Ryan Blaney (P)	Team Penske	Ford	7
5	23	Bubba Wallace	23XI Racing	Toyota	6
6	22	Joey Logano (P)	Team Penske	Ford	5
7	38	Zane Smith	Front Row Motorsports	Ford	4
8	71	Michael McDowell	Spire Motorsports	Chevrolet	3
9	77	Carson Hocevar	Spire Motorsports	Chevrolet	2
10	20	Christopher Bell (P)	Joe Gibbs Racing	Toyota	1
Official stage one results

Stage Two Laps: 60

Pos	No	Driver	Team	Manufacturer	Points
1	19	Chase Briscoe (P)	Joe Gibbs Racing	Toyota	10
2	5	Kyle Larson (P)	Hendrick Motorsports	Chevrolet	9
3	77	Carson Hocevar	Spire Motorsports	Chevrolet	8
4	24	William Byron (P)	Hendrick Motorsports	Chevrolet	7
5	20	Christopher Bell (P)	Joe Gibbs Racing	Toyota	6
6	54	Ty Gibbs	Joe Gibbs Racing	Toyota	5
7	34	Todd Gilliland	Front Row Motorsports	Ford	4
8	12	Ryan Blaney (P)	Team Penske	Ford	3
9	42	John Hunter Nemechek	Legacy Motor Club	Toyota	2
10	48	Alex Bowman	Hendrick Motorsports	Chevrolet	1
Official stage two results

=== Final Stage results ===
Stage Three Laps: 68

Pos	Grid	No	Driver	Team	Manufacturer	Laps	Points
1	2	19	Chase Briscoe (P)	Joe Gibbs Racing	Toyota	193	50
2	27	34	Todd Gilliland	Front Row Motorsports	Ford	193	39
3	18	54	Ty Gibbs	Joe Gibbs Racing	Toyota	193	49
4	10	23	Bubba Wallace	23XI Racing	Toyota	193	39
5	12	41	Cole Custer	Haas Factory Team	Ford	193	32
6	32	77	Carson Hocevar	Spire Motorsports	Chevrolet	193	41
7	15	45	Tyler Reddick	23XI Racing	Toyota	193	39
8	7	20	Christopher Bell (P)	Joe Gibbs Racing	Toyota	193	36
9	23	38	Zane Smith	Front Row Motorsports	Ford	193	32
10	20	6	Brad Keselowski	RFK Racing	Ford	193	27
11	31	88	Shane van Gisbergen (R)	Trackhouse Racing	Chevrolet	193	26
12	26	99	Daniel Suárez	Trackhouse Racing	Chevrolet	193	25
13	24	1	Ross Chastain	Trackhouse Racing	Chevrolet	193	24
14	28	42	John Hunter Nemechek	Legacy Motor Club	Toyota	193	33
15	5	60	Ryan Preece	RFK Racing	Ford	193	22
16	16	22	Joey Logano (P)	Team Penske	Ford	193	26
17	1	71	Michael McDowell	Spire Motorsports	Chevrolet	193	24
18	40	66	Casey Mears	Garage 66	Ford	193	0
19	3	8	Kyle Busch	Richard Childress Racing	Chevrolet	193	18
20	29	10	Ty Dillon	Kaulig Racing	Chevrolet	193	17
21	38	62	Anthony Alfredo (i)	Beard Motorsports	Chevrolet	193	0
22	33	33	Austin Hill (i)	Richard Childress Racing	Chevrolet	193	0
23	8	12	Ryan Blaney (P)	Team Penske	Ford	193	24
24	17	11	Denny Hamlin (P)	Joe Gibbs Racing	Toyota	193	13
25	13	24	William Byron (P)	Hendrick Motorsports	Chevrolet	193	19
26	19	5	Kyle Larson (P)	Hendrick Motorsports	Chevrolet	193	20
27	21	3	Austin Dillon	Richard Childress Racing	Chevrolet	191	10
28	39	78	B. J. McLeod (i)	Live Fast Motorsports	Chevrolet	187	0
29	11	48	Alex Bowman	Hendrick Motorsports	Chevrolet	187	9
30	14	17	Chris Buescher	RFK Racing	Ford	186	7
31	35	51	Cody Ware	Rick Ware Racing	Ford	165	6
32	9	35	Riley Herbst (R)	23XI Racing	Toyota	141	5
33	6	21	Josh Berry	Wood Brothers Racing	Ford	133	4
34	4	2	Austin Cindric	Team Penske	Ford	77	3
35	30	43	Erik Jones	Legacy Motor Club	Toyota	55	2
36	36	4	Noah Gragson	Front Row Motorsports	Ford	51	1
37	34	16	A. J. Allmendinger	Kaulig Racing	Chevrolet	51	1
38	37	47	Ricky Stenhouse Jr.	Hyak Motorsports	Chevrolet	51	1
39	22	7	Justin Haley	Spire Motorsports	Chevrolet	51	1
40	25	9	Chase Elliott (P)	Hendrick Motorsports	Chevrolet	51	1
Official race results

=== Race statistics ===
- Lead changes: 77 among 27 different drivers
- Cautions/Laps: 6 for 28
- Red flags: 0
- Time of race: 3 hours, 26 minutes, and 29 seconds
- Average speed: 149.178 miles per hour (240.079 km/h)

== Media ==
=== Television ===
NBC covered the race on the television side. Leigh Diffey, Jeff Burton, and Steve Letarte called the race from the broadcast booth. Dave Burns, Kim Coon, Marty Snider, and Dillon Welch handled the pit road duties from pit lane.

NBC
Booth announcers	Pit reporters
Lap-by-lap: Leigh Diffey; Color-commentator: Jeff Burton; Color-commentator: Steve Letarte	Dave Burns; Kim Coon; Marty Snider; Dillon Welch

=== Radio ===
MRN had the radio call for the race, which was also simulcasted on Sirius XM NASCAR Radio. Alex Hayden, Kyle Rickey and former championship winning crew chief Todd Gordon called the race for MRN when the field races through the tri-oval. Dave Moody called the action from turn 1, Tim Catalfamo called the action for MRN when the field races down the back straightaway, and Chris Wilner called the race from the Sunoco tower just outside of turn 4. Steve Post, Jason Toy, Jacklyn Drake and PRN Radio's Brad Gillie called the action for MRN from pit lane.

MRN
Booth announcers	Turn announcers	Pit reporters
Lead announcer: Alex Hayden; Announcer: Kyle Rickey; Announcer: Todd Gordon	Turns 1 & 2: Dave Moody; Backstretch: Tim Catalfamo; Turns 3 & 4: Chris Wilner	Steve Post; Jason Toy; Jacklyn Drake; Brad Gillie

== Standings after the race ==
Drivers' Championship standings

	Pos	Driver	Points
3	1	Chase Briscoe	4,116
1	2	Christopher Bell	4,107 (–9)
1	3	Kyle Larson	4,106 (–10)
3	4	Denny Hamlin	4,103 (–13)
	5	William Byron	4,070 (–46)
1	6	Joey Logano	4,068 (–48)
1	7	Ryan Blaney	4,059 (–57)
2	8	Chase Elliott	4,044 (–72)
	9	Tyler Reddick	2,270 (–1,846)
	10	Bubba Wallace	2,236 (–1,880)
	11	Ross Chastain	2,210 (–1,906)
	12	Shane van Gisbergen	2,172 (–1,944)
	13	Alex Bowman	2,152 (–1,964)
	14	Austin Cindric	2,123 (–1,993)
	15	Austin Dillon	2,114 (–2,002)
	16	Josh Berry	2,093 (–2,023)
Official driver's standings

Manufacturers' Championship standings

Pos	Manufacturer	Points
1	Chevrolet	1,236
2	Toyota	1,220 (–16)
3	Ford	1,135 (–101)

- Note: Only the first 16 positions are included for the driver standings.

Previous race: 2025 South Point 400	NASCAR Cup Series; 2025 season	Next race: 2025 Xfinity 500
