= 2022 Autotrader EchoPark Automotive 500 =

NASCAR Cup Series race

Race details
- Race 30 of 36 in the 2022 NASCAR Cup Series
- Date: September 25, 2022
- Location: Texas Motor Speedway in Fort Worth, Texas
- Course: Permanent racing facility
- Course length: 1.5 miles (2.4 km)
- Distance: 334 laps, 501 mi (801.6 km)
- Average speed: 114.784 miles per hour (184.727 km/h)

Pole position
Driver	Brad Keselowski	RFK Racing
- Time: 28.573

Most laps led
Driver	Tyler Reddick	Richard Childress Racing
- Laps: 70

Winner
No. 8	Tyler Reddick	Richard Childress Racing

Television in the United States
- Network: USA
- Announcers: Rick Allen, Jeff Burton, Steve Letarte and Dale Earnhardt Jr.

Radio in the United States
- Radio: PRN
- Booth announcers: Doug Rice and Mark Garrow
- Turn announcers: Rob Albright (1 & 2) and Pat Patterson (3 & 4)

The 2022 Autotrader EchoPark Automotive 500 was a NASCAR Cup Series race held on September 25, 2022, at Texas Motor Speedway in Fort Worth, Texas. Contested over 334 laps on the 1.5 mile (2.4 km) intermediate quad-oval, it was the 30th race of the 2022 NASCAR Cup Series season, fourth race of the Playoffs and first race of the Round of 12.

== Report ==
=== Background ===
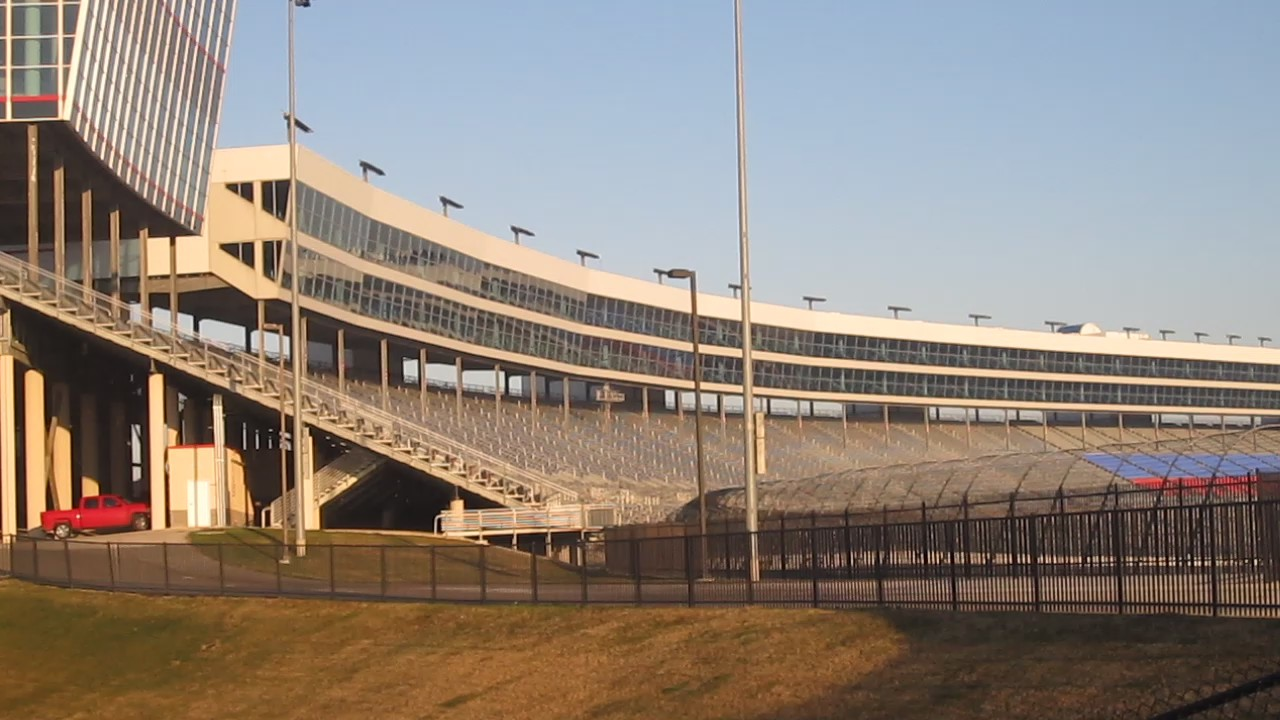
Texas Motor Speedway, the track where the race was held.

Texas Motor Speedway is a speedway located in the northernmost portion of the U.S. city of Fort Worth, Texas – the portion located in Denton County, Texas. The track measures 1.5 miles (2.4 km) around and is banked 24 degrees in the turns, and is of the oval design, where the front straightaway juts outward slightly. The track layout is similar to Atlanta Motor Speedway and Charlotte Motor Speedway (formerly Lowe's Motor Speedway). The track is owned by Speedway Motorsports, Inc., the same company that owns Atlanta and Charlotte Motor Speedway, as well as the short-track Bristol Motor Speedway.

==== Entry list ====
- (R) denotes rookie driver.
- (i) denotes driver who is ineligible for series driver points.

No.	Driver	Team	Manufacturer
1	Ross Chastain	Trackhouse Racing Team	Chevrolet
2	Austin Cindric (R)	Team Penske	Ford
3	Austin Dillon	Richard Childress Racing	Chevrolet
4	Kevin Harvick	Stewart-Haas Racing	Ford
5	Kyle Larson	Hendrick Motorsports	Chevrolet
6	Brad Keselowski	RFK Racing	Ford
7	Corey LaJoie	Spire Motorsports	Chevrolet
8	Tyler Reddick	Richard Childress Racing	Chevrolet
9	Chase Elliott	Hendrick Motorsports	Chevrolet
10	Aric Almirola	Stewart-Haas Racing	Ford
11	Denny Hamlin	Joe Gibbs Racing	Toyota
12	Ryan Blaney	Team Penske	Ford
14	Chase Briscoe	Stewart-Haas Racing	Ford
15	Garrett Smithley (i)	Rick Ware Racing	Ford
16	Noah Gragson (i)	Kaulig Racing	Chevrolet
17	Chris Buescher	RFK Racing	Ford
18	Kyle Busch	Joe Gibbs Racing	Toyota
19	Martin Truex Jr.	Joe Gibbs Racing	Toyota
20	Christopher Bell	Joe Gibbs Racing	Toyota
21	Harrison Burton (R)	Wood Brothers Racing	Ford
22	Joey Logano	Team Penske	Ford
23	Ty Gibbs (i)	23XI Racing	Toyota
24	William Byron	Hendrick Motorsports	Chevrolet
31	Justin Haley	Kaulig Racing	Chevrolet
34	Michael McDowell	Front Row Motorsports	Ford
38	Todd Gilliland (R)	Front Row Motorsports	Ford
41	Cole Custer	Stewart-Haas Racing	Ford
42	Ty Dillon	Petty GMS Motorsports	Chevrolet
43	Erik Jones	Petty GMS Motorsports	Chevrolet
45	Bubba Wallace	23XI Racing	Toyota
47	Ricky Stenhouse Jr.	JTG Daugherty Racing	Chevrolet
48	Alex Bowman	Hendrick Motorsports	Chevrolet
51	Cody Ware	Rick Ware Racing	Ford
77	Landon Cassill (i)	Spire Motorsports	Chevrolet
78	B. J. McLeod (i)	Live Fast Motorsports	Ford
99	Daniel Suárez	Trackhouse Racing Team	Chevrolet
Official entry list

== Practice ==
Austin Dillon was the fastest in the practice session with a time of 28.778 seconds and a speed of 187.643 mph (301.982 km/h).

=== Practice results ===
Pos	No.	Driver	Team	Manufacturer	Time	Speed
1	3	Austin Dillon	Richard Childress Racing	Chevrolet	28.778	187.643
2	8	Tyler Reddick	Richard Childress Racing	Chevrolet	28.796	187.526
3	48	Alex Bowman	Hendrick Motorsports	Chevrolet	28.881	186.974
Official practice results

== Qualifying ==
Brad Keselowski scored the pole for the race with a time of 28.573 and a speed of 188.990 mph (304.150 km/h).

=== Qualifying results ===
Pos	No.	Driver	Team	Manufacturer	R1	R2
1	6	Brad Keselowski	RFK Racing	Ford	28.698	28.573
2	22	Joey Logano	Team Penske	Ford	28.674	28.601
3	24	William Byron	Hendrick Motorsports	Chevrolet	28.588	28.601
4	8	Tyler Reddick	Richard Childress Racing	Chevrolet	28.593	28.664
5	34	Michael McDowell	Front Row Motorsports	Ford	28.723	28.719
6	9	Chase Elliott	Hendrick Motorsports	Chevrolet	28.719	28.731
7	3	Austin Dillon	Richard Childress Racing	Chevrolet	28.716	28.793
8	11	Denny Hamlin	Joe Gibbs Racing	Toyota	28.723	28.879
9	5	Kyle Larson	Hendrick Motorsports	Chevrolet	28.665	28.996
10	99	Daniel Suárez	Trackhouse Racing Team	Chevrolet	28.719	29.126
11	2	Austin Cindric (R)	Team Penske	Ford	28.751	—
12	1	Ross Chastain	Trackhouse Racing Team	Chevrolet	28.753	—
13	17	Chris Buescher	RFK Racing	Ford	28.763	—
14	12	Ryan Blaney	Team Penske	Ford	28.768	—
15	19	Martin Truex Jr.	Joe Gibbs Racing	Toyota	28.826	—
16	23	Ty Gibbs (i)	23XI Racing	Toyota	28.836	—
17	48	Alex Bowman	Hendrick Motorsports	Chevrolet	28.837	—
18	18	Kyle Busch	Joe Gibbs Racing	Toyota	28.840	—
19	45	Bubba Wallace	23XI Racing	Toyota	28.851	—
20	21	Harrison Burton (R)	Wood Brothers Racing	Ford	28.851	—
21	47	Ricky Stenhouse Jr.	JTG Daugherty Racing	Chevrolet	28.944	—
22	20	Christopher Bell	Joe Gibbs Racing	Toyota	28.963	—
23	4	Kevin Harvick	Stewart-Haas Racing	Ford	28.994	—
24	41	Cole Custer	Stewart-Haas Racing	Ford	29.051	—
25	10	Aric Almirola	Stewart-Haas Racing	Ford	29.084	—
26	16	Noah Gragson (i)	Kaulig Racing	Chevrolet	29.103	—
27	43	Erik Jones	Petty GMS Motorsports	Chevrolet	29.137	—
28	38	Todd Gilliland (R)	Front Row Motorsports	Ford	29.170	—
29	7	Corey LaJoie	Spire Motorsports	Chevrolet	29.170	—
30	14	Chase Briscoe	Stewart-Haas Racing	Ford	29.181	—
31	31	Justin Haley	Kaulig Racing	Chevrolet	29.261	—
32	42	Ty Dillon	Petty GMS Motorsports	Chevrolet	29.305	—
33	15	Garrett Smithley (i)	Rick Ware Racing	Ford	29.501	—
34	78	B. J. McLeod (i)	Live Fast Motorsports	Ford	29.744	—
35	77	Landon Cassill (i)	Spire Motorsports	Chevrolet	30.380	—
36	51	Cody Ware	Rick Ware Racing	Ford	0.000	—
Official qualifying results

== Race ==
Throughout the race, several drivers suffered from tire failures; Corey LaJoie and Kevin Harvick's crew chief Rodney Childers suggested the issue was due to practice of teams running lower tire pressures than Goodyear suggested in pursuit of speed due to restrictions on suspension shock travel on the Next Gen car, with Childers suggesting that the track's configuration worsened the issue. One tire failure in particular, Alex Bowman's on lap 98, resulted in Bowman being diagnosed for concussion-like symptoms after a rear impact crash for which Bowman was forced to sit out the rest of Round of 12 and Round of 8 races.

On lap 168, Cody Ware suffered from a hard crash, colliding with the turn 4 wall before violently hitting the pit wall, sustaining an impaction fracture on his ankle from the crash. Despite the wreck, Ware was cleared to compete for the next race.

=== Stage Results ===
Stage One Laps: 105

Pos	No	Driver	Team	Manufacturer	Points
1	5	Kyle Larson	Hendrick Motorsports	Chevrolet	10
2	11	Denny Hamlin	Joe Gibbs Racing	Toyota	9
3	22	Joey Logano	Team Penske	Ford	8
4	99	Daniel Suárez	Trackhouse Racing Team	Chevrolet	7
5	1	Ross Chastain	Trackhouse Racing Team	Chevrolet	6
6	24	William Byron	Hendrick Motorsports	Chevrolet	5
7	47	Ricky Stenhouse Jr.	JTG Daugherty Racing	Chevrolet	4
8	6	Brad Keselowski	RFK Racing	Ford	3
9	2	Austin Cindric (R)	Team Penske	Ford	2
10	34	Michael McDowell	Front Row Motorsports	Ford	1
Official stage one results

Stage Two Laps: 105

Pos	No	Driver	Team	Manufacturer	Points
1	12	Ryan Blaney	Team Penske	Ford	10
2	1	Ross Chastain	Trackhouse Racing Team	Chevrolet	9
3	24	William Byron	Hendrick Motorsports	Chevrolet	8
4	6	Brad Keselowski	RFK Racing	Ford	7
5	99	Daniel Suárez	Trackhouse Racing Team	Chevrolet	6
6	3	Austin Dillon	Richard Childress Racing	Chevrolet	5
7	2	Austin Cindric (R)	Team Penske	Ford	4
8	22	Joey Logano	Team Penske	Ford	3
9	19	Martin Truex Jr.	Joe Gibbs Racing	Toyota	2
10	34	Michael McDowell	Front Row Motorsports	Ford	1
Official stage two results

=== Final Stage Results ===
Stage Three Laps: 124

Pos	Grid	No	Driver	Team	Manufacturer	Laps	Points
1	4	8	Tyler Reddick	Richard Childress Racing	Chevrolet	334	40
2	2	22	Joey Logano	Team Penske	Ford	334	46
3	31	31	Justin Haley	Kaulig Racing	Chevrolet	334	34
4	14	12	Ryan Blaney	Team Penske	Ford	334	43
5	30	14	Chase Briscoe	Stewart-Haas Racing	Ford	334	32
6	27	43	Erik Jones	Petty GMS Motorsports	Chevrolet	334	31
7	3	24	William Byron (Note: Byron was initially deducted 25 points after the race for spinning Denny Hamlin during a caution period. The points penalty was later overturned.)	Hendrick Motorsports	Chevrolet	334	43
8	1	6	Brad Keselowski	RFK Racing	Ford	334	39
9	9	5	Kyle Larson	Hendrick Motorsports	Chevrolet	334	38
10	8	11	Denny Hamlin	Joe Gibbs Racing	Toyota	334	36
11	5	34	Michael McDowell	Front Row Motorsports	Ford	334	28
12	10	99	Daniel Suárez	Trackhouse Racing Team	Chevrolet	334	38
13	12	1	Ross Chastain	Trackhouse Racing Team	Chevrolet	334	39
14	29	7	Corey LaJoie	Spire Motorsports	Chevrolet	334	23
15	11	2	Austin Cindric (R)	Team Penske	Ford	334	28
16	32	42	Ty Dillon	Petty GMS Motorsports	Chevrolet	334	21
17	7	3	Austin Dillon	Richard Childress Racing	Chevrolet	334	25
18	20	21	Harrison Burton (R)	Wood Brothers Racing	Ford	334	19
19	23	4	Kevin Harvick	Stewart-Haas Racing	Ford	334	18
20	16	23	Ty Gibbs (i)	23XI Racing	Toyota	334	0
21	26	16	Noah Gragson (i)	Kaulig Racing	Chevrolet	334	0
22	35	77	Landon Cassill (i)	Spire Motorsports	Chevrolet	334	0
23	33	15	Garrett Smithley (i)	Rick Ware Racing	Ford	334	0
24	25	10	Aric Almirola	Stewart-Haas Racing	Ford	334	13
25	19	45	Bubba Wallace	23XI Racing	Toyota	334	12
26	34	78	B. J. McLeod (i)	Live Fast Motorsports	Ford	333	0
27	21	47	Ricky Stenhouse Jr.	JTG Daugherty Racing	Chevrolet	333	14
28	28	38	Todd Gilliland (R)	Front Row Motorsports	Ford	333	9
29	17	48	Alex Bowman	Hendrick Motorsports	Chevrolet	329	8
30	13	17	Chris Buescher	RFK Racing	Ford	270	7
31	15	19	Martin Truex Jr.	Joe Gibbs Racing	Toyota	267	8
32	6	9	Chase Elliott	Hendrick Motorsports	Chevrolet	184	5
33	36	51	Cody Ware	Rick Ware Racing	Ford	166	4
34	22	20	Christopher Bell	Joe Gibbs Racing	Toyota	136	3
35	24	41	Cole Custer	Stewart-Haas Racing	Ford	77	2
36	18	18	Kyle Busch	Joe Gibbs Racing	Toyota	48	1
Official race results

=== Race statistics ===
- Lead changes: 36 among 19 different drivers
- Cautions/Laps: 16 for 91 (track high)
- Red flags: 1 for 56 minutes
- Time of race: 4 hours, 21 minutes and 53 seconds
- Average speed: 114.784 miles per hour (184.727 km/h)

=== Penalties ===
William Byron was initially fined $50,000 and fined 25 driver and owner points for spinning Denny Hamlin during a late caution period. NASCAR initially did not notice the incident during the race, and the penalty was applied two days later. Ty Gibbs was also fined $75,000 and docked 25 owner points (as Gibbs competed for Xfinity Series points, he received no driver point penalties) for contact with Ty Dillon on the pit road. It was Gibbs' second penalty for dangerous driving on the pit road, as he had also been penalized for doing the same against Sam Mayer at the Call 811 Before You Dig 250 in the Xfinity Series that led to a fistfight after the aforementioned race.

On October 6, 2022, Byron's points penalty was overturned, but the fine was increased to $100,000. Subsequent to the appeal, NASCAR updated their rulebook so that further incidents like Byron's can result in both fines and point penalties, not just one of them.

== Media ==
=== Television ===
USA covered the race on the television side. Rick Allen, Two–time Texas winner Jeff Burton, Steve Letarte and 2000 Texas winner Dale Earnhardt Jr. called the race from the broadcast booth. Kim Coon, Parker Kligerman and Marty Snider handled the pit road duties from pit lane.

USA
Booth announcers	Pit reporters
Lap-by-lap: Rick Allen; Color-commentator: Jeff Burton; Color-commentator: Steve Letarte; Color-commentator: Dale Earnhardt Jr.	Kim Coon; Parker Kligerman; Marty Snider

=== Radio ===
PRN had the radio call for the race, which was also simulcast on Sirius XM NASCAR Radio. Doug Rice & Mark Garrow covered the action for PRN when the field raced down the front straightaway. Rob Albright covered the action for PRN from a platform outside of Turns 1 & 2, & Pat Patterson covered the action from a platform outside of Turns 3 & 4 for PRN. Brad Gillie, Brett McMillan and Wendy Venturini had the call from pit lane for PRN.

PRN
Booth announcers	Turn announcers	Pit reporters
Lead announcer: Doug Rice; Announcer: Mark Garrow	Turns 1 & 2: Rob Albright; Turns 3 & 4: Pat Patterson	Brad Gillie; Brett McMillan; Wendy Venturini

== Standings after the race ==
Drivers' Championship standings

	Pos	Driver	Points
1	1	Joey Logano	3,071
1	2	Ross Chastain	3,059 (–12)
2	3	William Byron	3,058 (–13)
	4	Kyle Larson	3,057 (–14)
3	5	Ryan Blaney	3,056 (–15)
	6	Denny Hamlin	3,049 (–22)
6	7	Chase Elliott	3,045 (–26)
3	8	Daniel Suárez	3,045 (–26)
	9	Chase Briscoe	3,041 (–30)
2	10	Austin Cindric	3,034 (–37)
4	11	Christopher Bell	3,016 (–55)
2	12	Alex Bowman	3,015 (–56)
	13	Tyler Reddick	2,107 (–964)
1	14	Austin Dillon	2,083 (–988)
1	15	Kyle Busch	2,068 (–1,003)
	16	Kevin Harvick	2,063 (–1,008)
Official driver's standings

Manufacturers' Championship standings

Pos	Manufacturer	Points
1	Chevrolet	1,107
2	Ford	1,034 (–73)
3	Toyota	981 (–126)

- Note: Only the first 16 positions are included for the driver standings.

== Notes ==
Previous race: 2022 Bass Pro Shops Night Race	NASCAR Cup Series; 2022 season	Next race: 2022 YellaWood 500
