= Cody Ware =

American racing driver (born 1995)

- Ware at Las Vegas Motor Speedway in 2026
- Born: Cody Shane Ware; November 7, 1995 (age 31); Greensboro, North Carolina, U.S.
- Height: 6 ft 4 in (1.93 m)

NASCAR Cup Series career
- 178 races run over 10 years
- Car no., team: No. 51 (Rick Ware Racing)
- 2026 position: 35th
- Best finish: 32nd (2022)
- First race: 2017 Folds of Honor QuikTrip 500 (Atlanta)
- Last race: 2026 Season Finale 400 (Homestead)
| Wins | Top tens | Poles |
|---|---|---|
| 0 | 2 | 0 |

NASCAR O'Reilly Auto Parts Series career
- 29 races run over 9 years
- 2026 position: 93rd
- Best finish: 42nd (2021)
- First race: 2014 Nationwide Children's Hospital 200 (Mid-Ohio)
- Last race: 2026 Bennett Transportation & Logistics 250 (Atlanta)
| Wins | Top tens | Poles |
|---|---|---|
| 0 | 1 | 0 |

NASCAR FedEx Freight Truck Series career
- 7 races run over 4 years
- 2018 position: 114th
- Best finish: 60th (2015)
- First race: 2014 Fred's 250 (Talladega)
- Last race: 2017 Bar Harbor 200 (Dover)
| Wins | Top tens | Poles |
|---|---|---|
| 0 | 0 | 0 |

NASCAR Mexico Series career
- 1 race run over 1 year
- 2014 position: 42nd
- Best finish: 42nd (2014)
- First race: 2014 Puebla 240 (Puebla)
| Wins | Top tens | Poles |
|---|---|---|
| 0 | 0 | 0 |

IndyCar Series career
- 3 races run over 1 year
- 2021 position: 34th
- Best finish: 34th (2021)
- First race: 2021 REV Group Grand Prix at Road America (Road America)
- Last race: 2021 Big Machine Spiked Coolers Grand Prix (Indianapolis G.P.)
| Wins | Podiums | Poles |
|---|---|---|
| 0 | 0 | 0 |

Previous series
- 2021 2020 2019–20 2014 2013–14: WeatherTech SportsCar Championship; GT4 America Series; Asian Le Mans Series; Lamborghini Super Trofeo North America; Whelen Southern Modified Tour

Championship titles
- 2019–20: Asian Le Mans Series (LMP2 Am)

Awards
- 2014: Lamborghini Super Trofeo North America Rookie of the Year
- Statistics up to date as of November 8, 2026.

Cody Shane Ware (born November 7, 1995) is an American professional auto racing driver. He competes full-time in the NASCAR Cup Series, driving the No. 51 Chevrolet Camaro ZL1 for Rick Ware Racing. A third-generation driver with experience in stock car, sports car, and open-wheel racing, he is the son of NASCAR team owner Rick Ware.

== Sports car racing ==
In 2014, Ware competed in the Lamborghini Super Trofeo North America series, winning Rookie of the Year honors.

In 2019, Rick Ware Racing formed an Asian Le Mans Series program with Ware and Mark Kvamme as drivers of the Ligier JS P2. In their first race at Shanghai International Circuit, despite missing qualifying and only having two laps of practice, Ware and Kvamme finished second in the LMPS Am class and fourteenth overall. On November 23, Ware announced he would compete in the 2020 24 Hours of Le Mans for EuroInternational. In January 2020's Asian Le Mans race at The Bend Motorsport Park, Ware and co-driver Gustas Grinbergas finished fifth overall and recorded the LMP2 Am Trophy class win.

In August 2020, Ware made his GT4 America Series SprintX debut at Sonoma Raceway, where he finished fifth overall and third in the Silver class for Dexter Racing.

When RWR partnered with Eurasia Motorsport to form RWR Eurasia for the 2021 24 Hours of Daytona, Ware was among the team's LMP2 drivers alongside Austin Dillon, Salih Yoluç, and Sven Müller.

In January 2024, Ware competed in the 2024 IMSA VP Racing SportsCar Challenge in the Ligier JS P320 LMP3 for Rick Ware Racing with Ave Motorsports, where he finished third in the first race and eighth in the second race.

== NASCAR ==
=== O'Reilly Series ===
In August 2014, Ware made his debut in the NASCAR O'Reilly Series at the Mid-Ohio Sports Car Course, starting 26th and finishing fifteenth for RWR. Over the next five seasons, among the teams he raced for were MBM Motorsports, B. J. McLeod Motorsports, Team Kapusta Racing, and Mike Harmon Racing. During the 2019 race at the Charlotte Motor Speedway Roval, Ware was replaced by Stefan Parsons after feeling unwell due to a damaged coolbox in his car.

Ware returned to RWR's reformed Xfinity Series team in 2020 at the Charlotte Roval, where he recorded his first series top-ten finish in seventh.

Ware drove in seven Xfinity Series races in 2021 for SS-Green Light Racing with Rick Ware Racing, scoring a best finish of fifteenth at Mid-Ohio Sports Car Course.

The entry list for the 2026 Bennett Transportation & Logistics 250 at Echopark Speedway revealed that Ware would be driving the No. 30 for Barrett-Cope Racing, making his first O'Reilly Series start since 2021.

=== Camping World Truck Series ===
In 2015, Ware joined MAKE Motorsports full-time for the 2015 NASCAR Camping World Truck Series season, competing for Rookie of the Year honors. However, on May 1, Ware announced that he would be leaving the team to attend college full-time, with aspirations for a pre-medical degree. Ware was replaced by Travis Kvapil in the No. 50.

Ware returned to the Truck Series in 2017, driving the No. 12 for RWR on a part-time basis. He attempted but failed to qualify for the 2018 season opener at Daytona with Mike Harmon Racing.

=== Cup Series ===
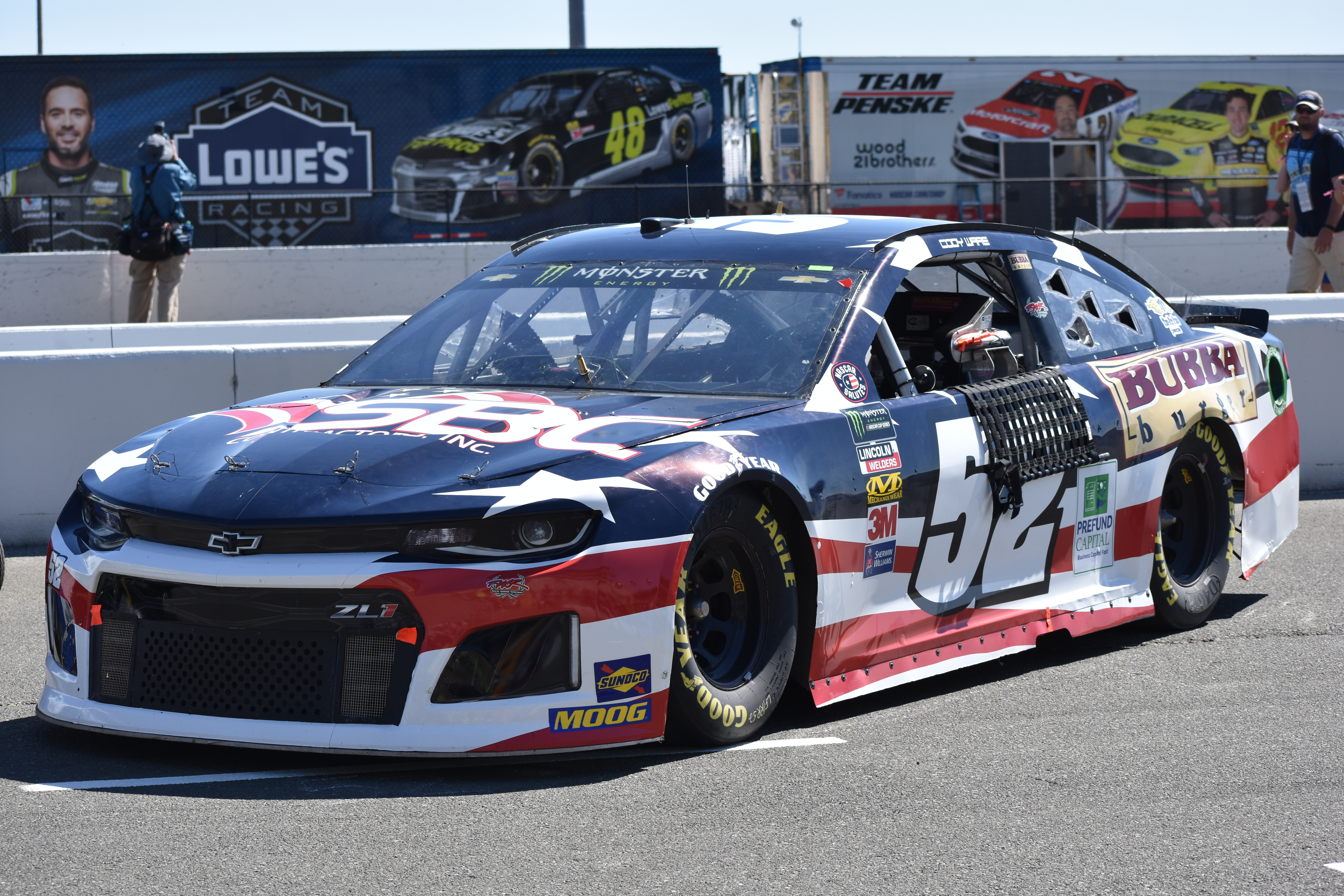
Ware's No. 52 at the 2018 Toyota/Save Mart 350

In June 2016, Ware attempted to make his Sprint Cup Series debut in the Toyota/Save Mart 350 at Sonoma Raceway, driving the No. 55 for Premium Motorsports, but he failed to qualify.

Ware joined RWR's Cup Series program, driving the No. 51 part-time in 2017. He made his Cup debut in the Folds of Honor QuikTrip 500 at Atlanta, driving the No. 51 with sponsorship from Spoonful of Music and Bubba Burger. Ware started and finished 39th, retiring from the race on lap 74 with steering problems. At Dover and Pocono, Ware's No. 51 acquired sponsorship from East Carolina University and Clemson University, respectively, with the latter also featuring logos celebrating the football team's 2017 College Football Playoff National Championship win earlier in the year. During the Dover race, Ware withdrew from the event after 283 of 406 laps after developing back pain. A week later at Pocono, he left the race after completing 35 laps, again for back problems. He was scheduled to drive at Michigan but Ware decided to stay out of the car for the race and the team did not find a replacement driver in time.

Ware returned to the No. 51 for Darlington's Bojangles' Southern 500, where he drove a car painted like Tom Cruise character Cole Trickle's Mello Yello vehicle of the same number in the film Days of Thunder; Ware's No. 51 featured logos saying "Pray for Texas", with RWR producing merchandise of the car and donating all proceeds to Hurricane Harvey relief efforts. On lap 157, Ware was involved in a wreck with Matt DiBenedetto and A. J. Allmendinger; after the race, Ware and DiBenedetto argued on Twitter over responsibility for the wreck. When DiBenedetto faulted Ware for the incident, the latter replied by falsely accusing him of infidelity, causing a firestorm that led to Ware deleting his social media for the rest of the season and up through 2018. A few months later, in February 2018, Ware restarted his Facebook profile and announced his Asperger's diagnosis in May. Ware later revealed in a January 2019 interview that the incident with DiBenedetto was one of his "biggest setbacks ever", but acknowledged "hitting rock bottom (after that) was the best thing that happened to me because that really gave me the wake-up call of 'hey, this is only going to get worse, and you're never going to come back from it unless you do something about it right now.'"

In 2018, Ware transitioned to motorcycle racing, but returned to the Cup Series for RWR at Dover. He also ran the Sonoma race, where he would DNF and place last.

Ware increased his Cup schedule in 2019 to thirteen races, which also included the Daytona 500; in the race, he and RWR teammate B. J. McLeod crashed while several cars were entering the pit road, causing him to finish 39th. At Sonoma, he was forced to exit the race on lap 64 when broken air conditioning caused him to suffer carbon monoxide poisoning. In September, he intended to race at the Charlotte Roval, but was replaced by J. J. Yeley as he continued to feel unwell from his damaged coolbox in the previous day's Xfinity race.

Ware's lone 2020 Cup start was the YellaWood 500 at Talladega Superspeedway. Towards the end of the race, due to a lot of front runners being involved in crashes, Ware was racing in the top ten until he crashed on the backstretch on the final lap, but was able to finish nineteenth for his first Cup Series top-twenty.

On January 18, 2021, RWR announced Ware would run the full 2021 Cup season in the team's No. 51 car. During the April Martinsville race, Ware was involved in an incident with teammate James Davison: on lap 37, contact from Ware's right front fender into Davison's left rear quarter panel sent the latter spinning into the outside wall. The race was postponed to the next day after weather, and radio communications between Ware and his crew chief revealed displeasure towards Davison, with Ware threatening to turn him if he encountered him again. After the team threatened to park Ware, the two raced for the rest of the event. Ware missed the Richmond playoff race and was substituted by Garrett Smithley after he was sidelined with carbon monoxide poisoning following the 2021 Cook Out Southern 500 at Darlington. At Bristol Motor Speedway Ware got into Chase Elliott, the two would become heated after the race.

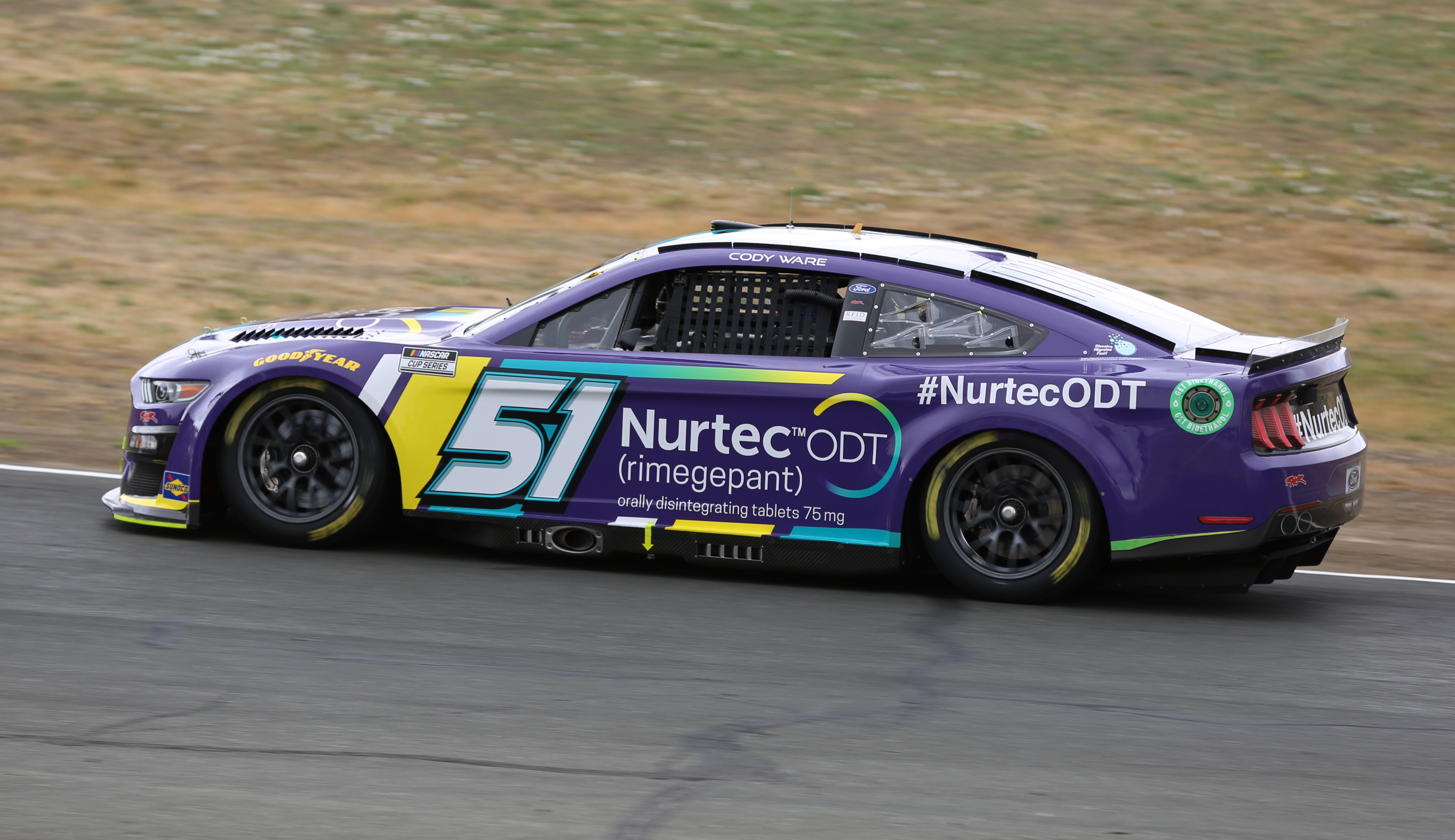
Ware's No. 51 car at Sonoma Raceway in 2022

Ware returned to the No. 51 for the 2022 season, starting with a seventeenth-place finish at the 2022 Daytona 500. At Sonoma, the No. 51 failed pre-race inspection four times and was hit with an L1 penalty, resulting in a start at the back of the field and a pass-through penalty on the first lap. In addition, the team was deducted twenty owner and driver points. On August 23, crew chief Billy Plourde was suspended for four races after the No. 51 lost a ballast during practice at Watkins Glen. The following week at Daytona for the 2022 Coke Zero Sugar 400, Ware avoided a massive wreck with over 20 laps to go and was in P4 before the rain delay. After the delay, Ware ran with the leaders and finished a career-best sixth place for his first career Cup Series top-ten finish. At Texas, Ware was involved in a hard crash on lap 168 after hitting the turn 4 wall and hitting the pit wall afterward but was treated and released from the infield care center without serious injury. He sustained an impaction fracture on his ankle from the crash. Although Ware was cleared for (and competed in) the following Talladega race, Ware skipped the Charlotte Roval race due to his injury, with Yeley substituting him in the No. 51.

Ware returned to the No. 51 for 2023, starting with a fourteenth place finish in the 2023 Daytona 500. After running the season's first seven races, he announced he would miss the 2023 Food City Dirt Race at Bristol due to a personal matter. A day after the race, on April 10, Ware was indefinitely suspended by NASCAR after being arrested and charged with a felony assault by strangulation as well as a misdemeanor assault on a woman in Iredell County, North Carolina. RWR would replace Ware with various drivers on race-by-race basis, starting from Zane Smith for the next race at Martinsville.

On December 12, 2023, Ware was reinstated by NASCAR after the charges against him were dropped.

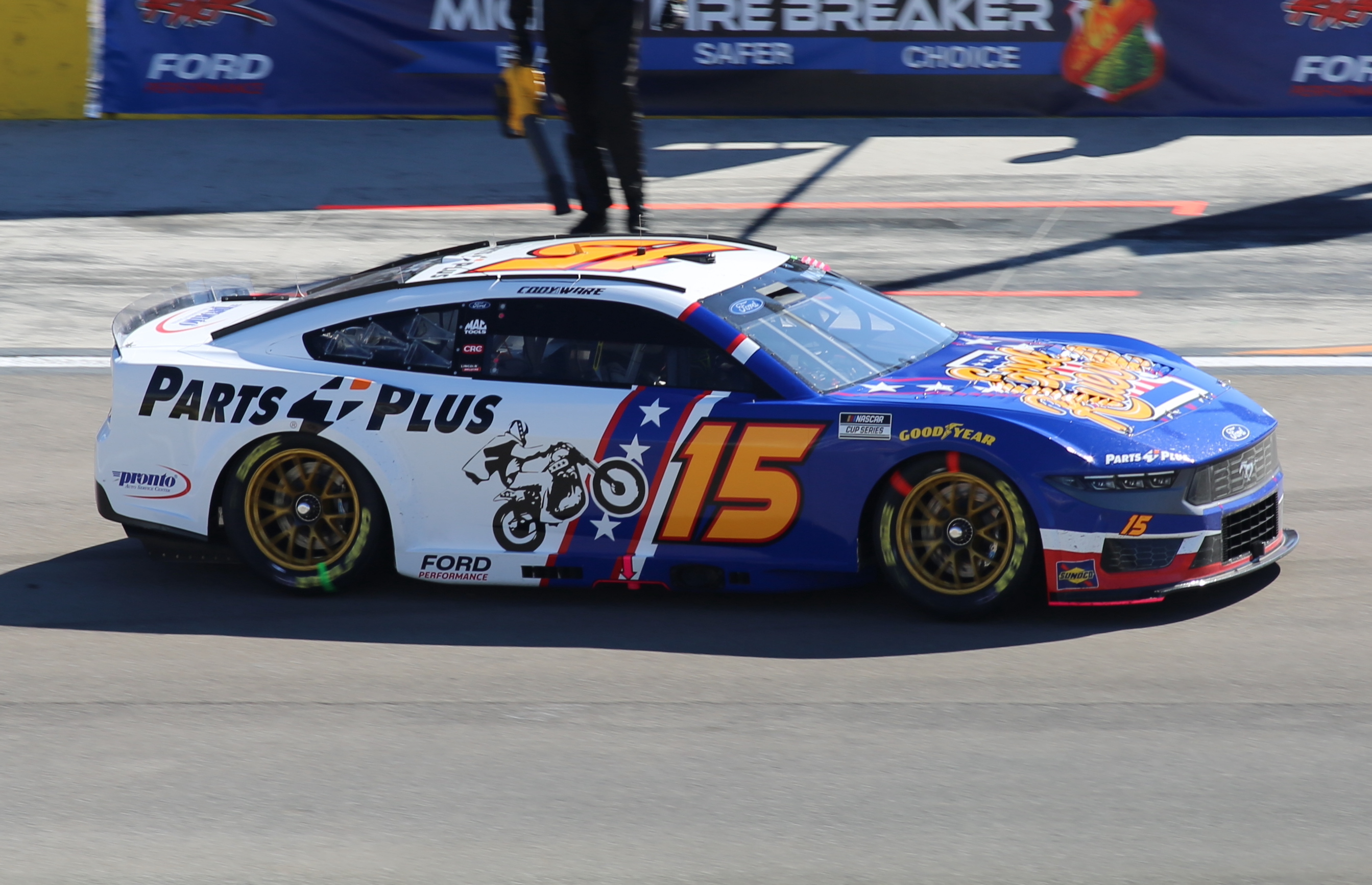
Ware's No. 15 car at Las Vegas Motor Speedway in 2024

On January 21, 2024, during the broadcast of the 2024 IMSA VP Racing SportsCar Challenge Race 2, it was announced that Ware would run ten races in the Cup Series if sponsorship allowed. On April 15, it was revealed that Ware would race the No. 15 RWR entry at Talladega, which would be his first NASCAR race since his suspension. In the 2024 Coke Zero Sugar 400, Ware would post a new career-best fourth place finish, his second top-ten and first top-five in the Cup Series.

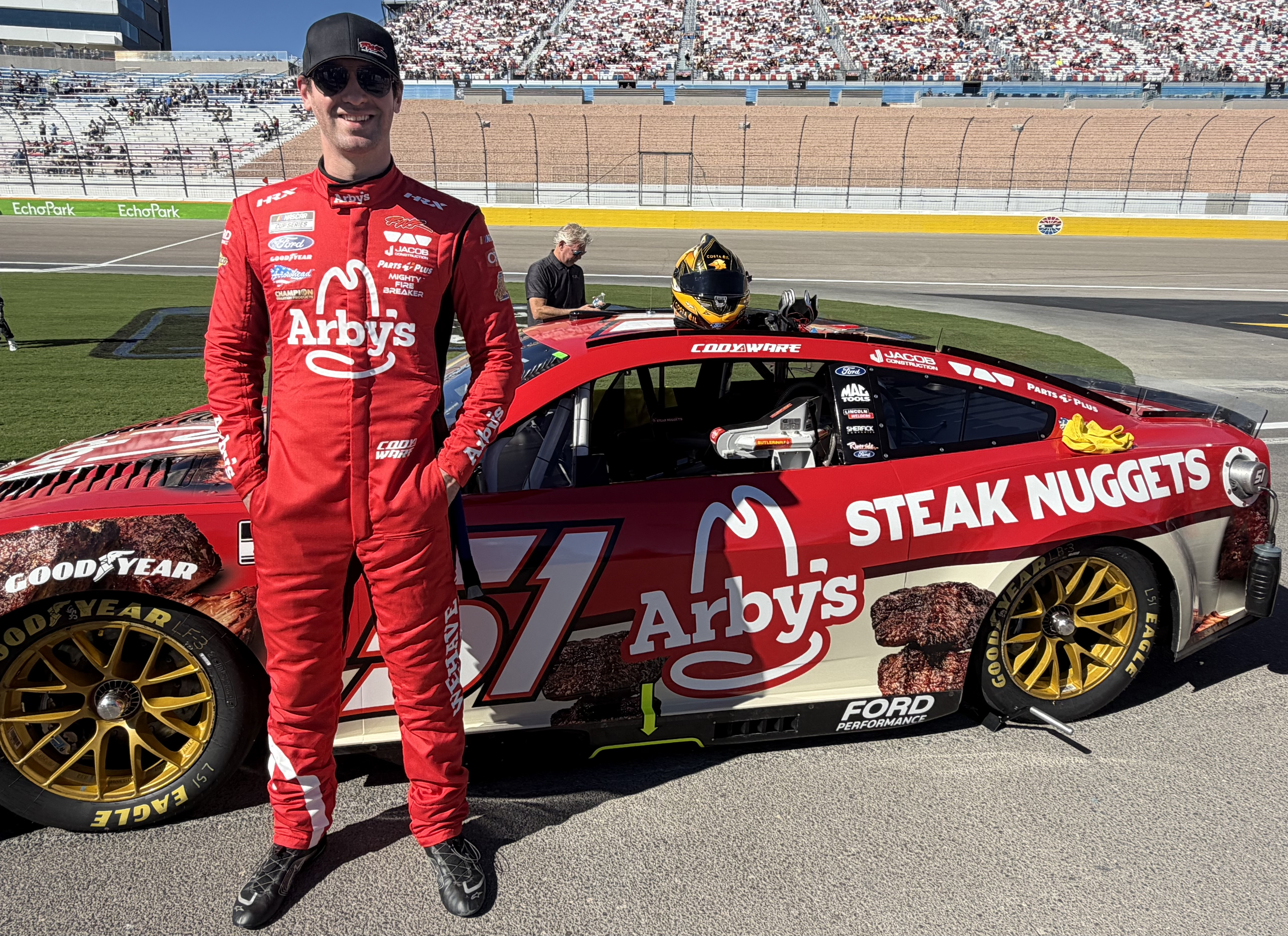
Ware standing alongside his car at the 2025 South Point 400.

On January 15, 2025, it was announced that Ware would return to full-time competition in the Cup Series for the 2025 season, driving the No. 51 for RWR. On May 12, 2025, it was announced that he would drive the No. 15 in the All-star Open due to Harrison Burton driving his usual No. 51 in the main event. In the 2025 Coke Zero Sugar 400 at Daytona, Ware led a career high 23 laps but finished in 20th. For the first time in his career, Ware raced all 36 of 36 races of the 2025 season.

== IndyCar Series ==
Entering the 2021 racing season, Ware expressed interest in running a part-time IndyCar Series schedule for Dale Coyne Racing with RWR, including the possibility of performing Double Duty of running the Indianapolis 500 and Coca-Cola 600 in the same day. In April, he participated in an IndyCar test for DCR at Texas Motor Speedway. He was entered for the 500 in the No. 52, and Garrett Smithley was placed in his No. 51 Cup car for that day's Coca-Cola 600; although Ware completed rookie orientation, a lack of sponsorship forced the entry to be withdrawn. Ware instead ran the 600 in the No. 53 that he took over from J. J. Yeley.

On June 15, it was announced that Ware would make his IndyCar Series debut at the REV Group Grand Prix at Road America, driving the No. 52 entry. He would go on to finish nineteenth and on the lead lap.

== Personal life ==
In February 2018, Ware tweeted that he struggles with depression and anxiety. Three months later, he revealed on Facebook that he has Asperger syndrome.

In May 2021, Ware revealed that during his teenage years, a group of friends led him to the woods only to douse gasoline on him and set him on fire, resulting in severe burns on the back of his legs.

On April 10, 2023, Ware was arrested for a felony assault by strangulation and a misdemeanor on a female. He originally missed the Food City Dirt Race at Bristol due to what was initially announced as personal reasons and was replaced by Matt Crafton, who finished 34th with engine problems. NASCAR indefinitely suspended him on April 10. The charges were dropped by prosecutors in December, upon which Ware was reinstated to NASCAR.

== Motorsports career results ==
=== Racing career summary ===
| Season | Series | Team | Races | Wins | Top 5 | Top 10 | Points | Position |
|---|---|---|---|---|---|---|---|---|
| 2013 | NASCAR Whelen Southern Modified Tour | Mike Speeney | 2 | 0 | 0 | 0 | 55 | 29th |
| 2014 | NASCAR Whelen Southern Modified Tour | Mike Speeney | 1 | 0 | 0 | 0 | 31 | 28th |
| 2014 | NASCAR Camping World Truck Series | Rick Ware Racing | 1 | 0 | 0 | 0 | 0 | NC† |
| 2014 | NASCAR Nationwide Series | Rick Ware Racing | 4 | 0 | 0 | 0 | 71 | 43rd |
| 2014 | NASCAR Toyota Series | Miriam Ibarra | 1 | 0 | 0 | 0 | 9 | 42nd |
| 2015 | NASCAR Camping World Truck Series | MAKE Motorsports | 2 | 0 | 0 | 0 | 31 | 60th |
| 2015 | NASCAR Xfinity Series | MBM Motorsports | 1 | 0 | 0 | 0 | 0 | NC† |
| 2015 | NASCAR Xfinity Series | Rick Ware Racing | 1 | 0 | 0 | 0 | 0 | NC† |
| 2016 | NASCAR Camping World Truck Series | SS-Green Light Racing | 2 | 0 | 0 | 0 | 0 | NC† |
| 2016 | NASCAR Xfinity Series | Rick Ware Racing | 4 | 0 | 0 | 0 | 43 | 45th |
| 2016 | NASCAR Xfinity Series | B. J. McLeod Motorsports | 1 | 0 | 0 | 0 | 43 | 45th |
| 2016 | NASCAR Xfinity Series | Team Kapusta Racing | 1 | 0 | 0 | 0 | 43 | 45th |
| 2016 | NASCAR Sprint Cup Series | Premium Motorsports | 0 | 0 | 0 | 0 | 0 | NC† |
| 2017 | NASCAR Xfinity Series | Mike Harmon Racing | 2 | 0 | 0 | 0 | 0 | NC† |
| 2017 | NASCAR Camping World Truck Series | Beaver Motorsports | 2 | 0 | 0 | 0 | 0 | NC† |
| 2017 | NASCAR Camping World Truck Series | Rick Ware Racing | 0 | 0 | 0 | 0 | 0 | NC† |
| 2017 | Monster Energy NASCAR Cup Series | Rick Ware Racing | 5 | 0 | 0 | 0 | 6 | 43rd |
| 2018 | NASCAR Camping World Truck Series | Mike Harmon Racing | 0 | 0 | 0 | 0 | 0 | NC† |
| 2018 | NASCAR Xfinity Series | Mike Harmon Racing | 1 | 0 | 0 | 0 | 0 | NC† |
| 2018 | NASCAR Xfinity Series | B. J. McLeod Motorsports | 2 | 0 | 0 | 0 | 0 | NC† |
| 2018 | Monster Energy NASCAR Cup Series | Rick Ware Racing | 4 | 0 | 0 | 0 | 11 | 42nd |
| 2019 | NASCAR Xfinity Series | B. J. McLeod Motorsports | 3 | 0 | 0 | 0 | 45 | 51st |
| 2019 | Monster Energy NASCAR Cup Series | Rick Ware Racing | 12 | 0 | 0 | 0 | 0 | NC† |
| 2019–20 | Asian Le Mans Series – LMP2 Am | Rick Ware Racing | 4 | 2 | 4 | 4 | 86 | **1st** |
| 2020 | NASCAR Xfinity Series | Rick Ware Racing | 1 | 0 | 0 | 1 | 30 | 58th |
| 2020 | NASCAR Cup Series | Rick Ware Racing | 1 | 0 | 0 | 0 | 0 | NC† |
| 2021 | NASCAR Xfinity Series | Rick Ware Racing | 7 | 0 | 0 | 0 | 92 | 42nd |
| 2021 | NASCAR Cup Series | Rick Ware Racing | 32 | 0 | 0 | 0 | 0 | NC† |
| 2021 | IndyCar Series | Dale Coyne Racing with Rick Ware Racing | 3 | 0 | 0 | 0 | 26 | 34th |
| 2021 | IMSA SportsCar Championship – LMP2 | RWR Eurasia | 1 | 0 | 1 | 1 | 0 | NC† |
| 2021 | 24 Hours of Daytona | RWR Eurasia | 1 | 0 | 1 | 1 | N/A | 4th |
| 2022 | NASCAR Cup Series | Rick Ware Racing | 35 | 0 | 0 | 1 | 305 | 32nd |
| 2023 | NASCAR Cup Series | Rick Ware Racing | 7 | 0 | 0 | 0 | 65 | 34th |
| 2024 | NASCAR Cup Series | Rick Ware Racing | 9 | 0 | 1 | 1 | 146 | 36th |
| 2025 | ASA STARS National Tour | Rick Ware Racing | 1 | 0 | 0 | 0 | 25 | 74th |
| 2025 | CARS Pro Late Model Tour | Rick Ware Racing | 2 | 0 | 1 | 1 | 69 | 28th |
| 2025 | NASCAR Cup Series | Rick Ware Racing | 36 | 0 | 0 | 0 | 233 | 36th |
| 2026 | NASCAR O'Reilly Auto Parts Series | Barrett-Cope Racing | 1 | 0 | 0 | 0 | 0 | NC† |
| 2026 | NASCAR Cup Series | Rick Ware Racing | 28 | 0 | 0 | 0 | 217* | 35th* |

^{†} As Ware was a guest driver, he was ineligible for championship points.

=== NASCAR ===
(key) (Bold – Pole position awarded by qualifying time. Italics – Pole position earned by points standings or practice time. * – Most laps led.)

==== Cup Series ====
NASCAR Cup Series results
| Year | Team | No. | Make | 1 | 2 | 3 | 4 | 5 | 6 | 7 | 8 | 9 | 10 | 11 | 12 | 13 | 14 | 15 | 16 | 17 | 18 | 19 | 20 | 21 | 22 | 23 | 24 | 25 | 26 | 27 | 28 | 29 | 30 | 31 | 32 | 33 | 34 | 35 | 36 | NCSC | Pts | Ref |
|---|---|---|---|---|---|---|---|---|---|---|---|---|---|---|---|---|---|---|---|---|---|---|---|---|---|---|---|---|---|---|---|---|---|---|---|---|---|---|---|---|---|---|
| 2016 | Premium Motorsports | 55 | Chevy | DAY | ATL | LVS | PHO | CAL | MAR | TEX | BRI | RCH | TAL | KAN | DOV | CLT | POC | MCH | SON; DNQ | DAY | KEN | NHA | IND | POC | GLN | BRI | MCH | DAR | RCH | CHI | NHA | DOV | CLT | KAN | TAL | MAR | TEX | PHO | HOM | 62nd | 0^{1} | |
| 2017 | Rick Ware Racing | 51 | Chevy | DAY | ATL; 39 | LVS | PHO | CAL | MAR | TEX | BRI | RCH | TAL | KAN | CLT | DOV; 35 | POC; 39 | MCH | SON | DAY | KEN | NHA | IND | POC | GLN | MCH | BRI | DAR; 37 | RCH | CHI | NHA; 39 | DOV | CLT | TAL | KAN | MAR | TEX | PHO | HOM | 43rd | 6 | |
| 2018 | Rick Ware Racing | 51 | Chevy | DAY | ATL | LVS | PHO | CAL | MAR | TEX | BRI | RCH | TAL | DOV; 36 | KAN | CLT | POC | MCH | | | | | | | | | | | | | | | | TAL; 38 | KAN | MAR | TEX | PHO; 28 | HOM | 42nd | 11^{2} | |
| 2018 | Rick Ware Racing | 52 | Chevy | | | | | | | | | | | | | | | | SON; 36 | CHI | DAY | KEN | NHA | POC | GLN | MCH | BRI | DAR | IND | LVS | RCH | ROV | DOV | | | | | | | 42nd | 11^{2} | |
| 2019 | Rick Ware Racing | 52 | Chevy | DAY; 39 | | | | | | | | | | | | | | | SON; 36 | CHI | DAY | KEN | NHA | POC | | | | | | | | | | | | | | | | 56th | 0^{3} | |
| 2019 | Rick Ware Racing | 51 | Ford | | ATL; 33 | | | | | | | | TAL; 28 | DOV; 34 | | CLT; 38 | POC | MCH | | | | | | | | MCH; 36 | BRI | DAR | IND | LVS | RCH | | | | | | | | | 56th | 0^{3} | |
| 2019 | Rick Ware Racing | 51 | Chevy | | | LVS; 35 | PHO; 32 | CAL; 32 | MAR; 36 | TEX | BRI | RCH | | | KAN; 40 | | | | | | | | | | GLN; 33 | | | | | | | ROV; QL^{†} | DOV | TAL | KAN | MAR | TEX | PHO | HOM | 56th | 0^{3} | |
| 2020 | Rick Ware Racing | 27 | Chevy | DAY | LVS | CAL | PHO | DAR | DAR | CLT | CLT | BRI | ATL | MAR | HOM | TAL | POC | POC | IND | KEN | TEX | KAN | NHA | MCH | MCH | DRC | DOV | DOV | DAY | DAR | RCH | BRI | LVS | TAL; 19 | ROV | KAN | TEX | MAR | PHO | 45th | 0^{1} | |
| 2021 | Rick Ware Racing | 51 | Chevy | DAY; 21 | DRC; 25 | HOM; 32 | LVS; 32 | PHO; 36 | ATL; 31 | BRD; 32 | MAR; 28 | RCH; 36 | TAL; 28 | KAN; 36 | DAR; 34 | DOV; 31 | COA; 32 | | SON; 34 | NSH | POC; 25 | POC; 28 | ROA; 31 | ATL; 33 | NHA; 31 | GLN | IRC; 40 | MCH; 27 | DAY; 28 | DAR; 33 | RCH | BRI | LVS; 31 | TAL; 28 | ROV; 36 | TEX; 38 | KAN; 31 | MAR; 30 | PHO; 28 | 53rd | 0^{4} | |
| 2021 | Rick Ware Racing | 53 | Chevy | | | | | | | | | | | | | | | CLT; 30 | | | | | | | | | | | | | | | | | | | | | | 53rd | 0^{4} | |
| 2022 | Rick Ware Racing | 51 | Ford | DAY; 17 | CAL; 32 | LVS; 26 | PHO; 31 | ATL; 26 | COA; 27 | RCH; 36 | MAR; 33 | BRD; 26 | TAL; 28 | DOV; 34 | DAR; 19 | KAN; 34 | CLT; 18 | GTW; 35 | SON; 32 | NSH; 27 | ROA; 32 | ATL; 23 | NHA; 30 | POC; 26 | IRC; 24 | MCH; 22 | RCH; 34 | GLN; 34 | DAY; 6 | DAR; 32 | KAN; 27 | BRI; 17 | TEX; 33 | TAL; 32 | ROV | LVS; 27 | HOM; 34 | MAR; 28 | PHO; 30 | 32nd | 305 | |
| 2023 | Rick Ware Racing | 51 | Ford | DAY; 14 | CAL; 27 | LVS; 35 | PHO; 34 | ATL; 25 | COA; 25 | RCH; 34 | BRD | MAR | TAL | DOV | KAN | DAR | CLT | GTW | SON | NSH | CSC | ATL | NHA | POC | RCH | MCH | IRC | GLN | DAY | DAR | KAN | BRI | TEX | TAL | ROV | LVS | HOM | MAR | PHO | 34th | 65 | |
| 2024 | Rick Ware Racing | 15 | Ford | DAY | ATL | LVS | PHO | BRI | COA | RCH | MAR | TEX | TAL; 24 | DOV | KAN | DAR | CLT | GTW; 33 | SON | IOW | NHA | NSH | CSC | POC; 26 | IND; 18 | RCH | MCH; 21 | DAY; 4 | DAR | ATL; 30 | GLN | BRI | KAN | TAL; 12 | ROV | LVS; 21 | HOM | MAR | PHO | 36th | 146 | |
| 2025 | Rick Ware Racing | 51 | Ford | DAY; 25 | ATL; 35 | COA; 31 | PHO; 24 | LVS; 36 | HOM; 34 | MAR; 30 | DAR; 27 | BRI; 36 | TAL; 31 | TEX; 30 | KAN; 30 | CLT; 25 | NSH; 33 | MCH; 26 | MXC; 31 | POC; 29 | ATL; 13 | CSC; 26 | SON; 34 | DOV; 36 | IND; 37 | IOW; 32 | GLN; 29 | RCH; 32 | DAY; 20 | DAR; 37 | GTW; 29 | BRI; 29 | NHA; 31 | KAN; 37 | ROV; 33 | LVS; 35 | TAL; 31 | MAR; 32 | PHO; 30 | 36th | 233 | |
| 2026 | Rick Ware Racing | 51 | Chevy | DAY; 17 | ATL; 27 | COA; 30 | PHO; 24 | LVS; 35 | DAR; 36 | MAR; 32 | BRI; 31 | KAN; 37 | TAL; 21 | TEX; 30 | GLN; 37 | CLT; 28 | NSH; 22 | MCH; 23 | POC; 30 | COR; 23 | SON; 33 | CHI; 30 | ATL; 32 | NWS; 29 | IND; 31 | IOW; 32 | RCH; 34 | NHA; 29 | DAY; 35 | DAR; 36 | GTW; 22 | BRI; 31 | KAN; 34 | LVS; 34 | CLT; 31 | PHO; 35 | TAL; 16 | MAR; 33 | HOM; 35 | 35th | 264 | |
^{†} – Qualified but replaced by J. J. Yeley

===== Daytona 500 =====
| Year | Team | Manufacturer | Start | Finish |
|---|---|---|---|---|
| 2019 | Rick Ware Racing | Chevrolet | 37 | 39 |
| 2021 | Rick Ware Racing | Chevrolet | 35 | 21 |
| 2022 | Rick Ware Racing | Ford | 32 | 17 |
| 2023 | Rick Ware Racing | Ford | 35 | 14 |
| 2025 | Rick Ware Racing | Ford | 28 | 25 |
| 2026 | Rick Ware Racing | Chevrolet | 33 | 17 |

==== O'Reilly Auto Parts Series ====
NASCAR O'Reilly Auto Parts Series results
| Year | Team | No. | Make | 1 | 2 | 3 | 4 | 5 | 6 | 7 | 8 | 9 | 10 | 11 | 12 | 13 | 14 | 15 | 16 | 17 | 18 | 19 | 20 | 21 | 22 | 23 | 24 | 25 | 26 | 27 | 28 | 29 | 30 | 31 | 32 | 33 | NOAPSC | Pts | Ref |
|---|---|---|---|---|---|---|---|---|---|---|---|---|---|---|---|---|---|---|---|---|---|---|---|---|---|---|---|---|---|---|---|---|---|---|---|---|---|---|---|
| 2014 | Rick Ware Racing | 23 | Chevy | DAY | PHO | LVS | BRI | CAL | TEX | DAR | RCH | TAL | IOW | CLT | DOV | MCH | ROA | KEN | DAY | NHA | CHI | IND | IOW | GLN | MOH; 15 | BRI | ATL | RCH; 29 | CHI; 29 | KEN; 32 | DOV | KAN | CLT | TEX | PHO | HOM | 43rd | 71 | |
| 2015 | MBM Motorsports | 13 | Dodge | DAY | ATL; 31 | | | | | | | | | | | | | | | | | | | | | | | | | | | | | | | | 113th | 0^{1} | |
| 2015 | Rick Ware Racing | 15 | Chevy | | | LVS; 34 | PHO | CAL | TEX | BRI | RCH | TAL | IOW | CLT | DOV | MCH | CHI | DAY | KEN | NHA | IND | IOW | GLN | MOH | BRI | ROA | DAR | RCH | CHI | KEN | DOV | CLT | KAN | TEX | PHO | HOM | 113th | 0^{1} | |
| 2016 | Rick Ware Racing | 15 | Chevy | DAY | ATL; 31 | | | | | | | | | | | | | | | | | | | | | | | | | | | | | | | | 45th | 43 | |
| 2016 | Rick Ware Racing | 25 | Chevy | | | LVS; 35 | PHO | CAL; 31 | TEX; 36 | BRI | RCH | TAL | DOV | | | | | | | | | | | | | | | | | | | | | | | | 45th | 43 | |
| 2016 | B. J. McLeod Motorsports | 15 | Ford | | | | | | | | | | | CLT; 38 | POC | MCH | IOW | DAY | KEN | NHA | IND | IOW | | | | | | | | | | | | | | | 45th | 43 | |
| 2016 | Team Kapusta Racing | 25 | Chevy | | | | | | | | | | | | | | | | | | | | GLN; 21 | MOH | BRI | ROA | DAR | RCH | CHI | KEN | DOV | CLT | KAN | TEX | PHO | HOM | 45th | 43 | |
| 2017 | Mike Harmon Racing | 74 | Dodge | DAY | ATL | LVS | PHO | CAL | TEX | BRI | RCH | TAL | CLT | DOV | POC | MCH | IOW | DAY | KEN | NHA | IND | IOW | GLN; 34 | MOH; 23 | BRI | ROA | DAR | RCH | CHI | KEN | DOV | CLT | KAN | TEX | PHO | HOM | 105th | 0^{1} | |
| 2018 | Mike Harmon Racing | 74 | Dodge | DAY | ATL | LVS | PHO | CAL | TEX | BRI; 30 | RCH | TAL | DOV | CLT | POC | MCH | IOW | CHI | DAY | KEN | NHA | IOW | GLN | | | | | | | | | | | | | | 106th | 0^{1} | |
| 2018 | B. J. McLeod Motorsports | 8 | Chevy | | | | | | | | | | | | | | | | | | | | | MOH; 33 | BRI | ROA | | | | | | | | | | | 106th | 0^{1} | |
| 2018 | B. J. McLeod Motorsports | 78 | Chevy | | | | | | | | | | | | | | | | | | | | | | | | DAR; 24 | IND | LVS | RCH | ROV | DOV | KAN | TEX | PHO | HOM | 106th | 0^{1} | |
| 2019 | B. J. McLeod Motorsports | 99 | Toyota | DAY | ATL | LVS | PHO | CAL | TEX | BRI | RCH | TAL; 21 | DOV | CLT | POC | MCH | IOW | CHI | DAY | KEN | NHA | IOW | | | | | | | | | | | | | | | 51st | 45 | |
| 2019 | B. J. McLeod Motorsports | 99 | Chevy | | | | | | | | | | | | | | | | | | | | GLN; 21 | MOH | BRI | ROA | DAR | IND | LVS | RCH | ROV; 24 | DOV | KAN | TEX | PHO | HOM | 51st | 45 | |
| 2020 | Rick Ware Racing | 17 | Ford | DAY | LVS | CAL | PHO | DAR | CLT | BRI | ATL | HOM | HOM | TAL | POC | IRC | KEN | KEN | TEX | KAN | ROA | DRC | DOV | DOV | DAY | DAR | RCH | RCH | BRI | LVS | TAL | ROV; 7 | KAN | TEX | MAR | PHO | 58th | 30 | |
| 2021 | SS-Green Light Racing with Rick Ware Racing | 17 | Chevy | DAY; 39 | | | | | ATL; 23 | MAR | TAL | DAR | DOV; 23 | COA | | | | | | | | | | | | | | | | | | | | | | | 42nd | 92^{4} | |
| 2021 | SS-Green Light Racing with Rick Ware Racing | 17 | Ford | | DRC; 25 | HOM | LVS | PHO | | | | | | | | MOH; 15 | TEX | NSH | POC | ROA; 24 | ATL | NHA | GLN | IRC | MCH | DAY | DAR | RCH | BRI | LVS | TAL | ROV | TEX | KAN | MAR | PHO | 42nd | 92^{4} | |
| 2021 | SS-Green Light Racing with Rick Ware Racing | 17 | Toyota | | | | | | | | | | | | CLT; 20 | | | | | | | | | | | | | | | | | | | | | | 42nd | 92^{4} | |
| 2026 | Barrett–Cope Racing | 30 | Chevy | DAY | ATL; 31 | COA | PHO | LVS | DAR | MAR | CAR | BRI | KAN | TAL | TEX | GLN | DOV | CLT | NSH | POC | COR | SON | CHI | ATL | IND | IOW | DAY | DAR | GTW | BRI | LVS | CLT | PHO | TAL | MAR | HOM | 93rd | 0^{1} | |

==== Camping World Truck Series ====
NASCAR Camping World Truck Series results
| Year | Team | No. | Make | 1 | 2 | 3 | 4 | 5 | 6 | 7 | 8 | 9 | 10 | 11 | 12 | 13 | 14 | 15 | 16 | 17 | 18 | 19 | 20 | 21 | 22 | 23 | NCWTC | Pts | Ref |
|---|---|---|---|---|---|---|---|---|---|---|---|---|---|---|---|---|---|---|---|---|---|---|---|---|---|---|---|---|---|
| 2014 | Rick Ware Racing | 5 | Chevy | DAY | MAR | KAN | CLT | DOV | TEX | GTW | KEN | IOW | ELD | POC | MCH | BRI | MSP | CHI | NHA | LVS | TAL; 27 | MAR | TEX | PHO | HOM | | 105th | 0^{1} | |
| 2015 | MAKE Motorsports | 50 | Chevy | DAY; DNQ | ATL; 30 | MAR; 27 | KAN | CLT | DOV | TEX | GTW | IOW | KEN | ELD | POC | MCH | BRI | MSP | CHI | NHA | LVS | TAL | MAR | TEX | PHO | HOM | 60th | 31 | |
| 2016 | SS-Green Light Racing | 07 | Chevy | DAY | ATL | MAR | KAN | DOV | CLT | TEX | IOW | GTW | KEN | ELD | POC | BRI | MCH | MSP; 17 | CHI | NHA | LVS | TAL; 21 | MAR | TEX | PHO | HOM | 96th | 0^{1} | |
| 2017 | Beaver Motorsports | 50 | Chevy | DAY | ATL | MAR | KAN; 22 | | DOV; 18 | TEX | GTW | IOW | KEN | ELD | POC | MCH | BRI | MSP | CHI | NHA | LVS | TAL | MAR | TEX | PHO | HOM | 90th | 0^{1} | |
| 2017 | Rick Ware Racing | 12 | Chevy | | | | | CLT; DNQ | | | | | | | | | | | | | | | | | | | 90th | 0^{1} | |
| 2018 | Mike Harmon Racing | 74 | Chevy | DAY; DNQ | ATL | LVS | MAR | DOV | KAN | CLT | TEX | IOW | GTW | CHI | KEN | ELD | POC | MCH | BRI | MSP | LVS | TAL | MAR | TEX | PHO | HOM | 114th | 0^{1} | |

^{*} Season still in progress
^{1} Ineligible for series points
^{2} Ware began the 2018 season racing for Truck Series points but switched to Cup Series points before the race at Sonoma.
^{3} Ware began the 2019 season racing for Cup Series points but switched to Xfinity Series points before the race at Talladega.
^{4} Ware began the 2021 season racing for Cup Series points but switched to Xfinity Series points before the race at the Daytona road course.

==== Toyota Series ====
NASCAR Toyota Series results
| Year | Car owner | No. | Make | 1 | 2 | 3 | 4 | 5 | 6 | 7 | 8 | 9 | 10 | 11 | 12 | 13 | 14 | 15 | NTSC | Pts | Ref |
|---|---|---|---|---|---|---|---|---|---|---|---|---|---|---|---|---|---|---|---|---|---|
| 2014 | Miriam Ibarra | 71 | Toyota | PHO | MXC | TUX | MTY | SLP | QRO | MXC | AGS | QRO | PUE | CHI | SLP | AGS | TUX | PUE; 35 | 42nd | 9 | |

==== Whelen Southern Modified Tour ====
NASCAR Whelen Southern Modified Tour results
| Year | Car owner | No. | Make | 1 | 2 | 3 | 4 | 5 | 6 | 7 | 8 | 9 | 10 | 11 | 12 | 13 | 14 | NWSMTC | Pts | Ref |
|---|---|---|---|---|---|---|---|---|---|---|---|---|---|---|---|---|---|---|---|---|
| 2013 | Mike Speeney | 80 | Chevy | CRW | SNM | SBO | CRW | CRW | BGS; 13 | BRI | LGY | CRW | CRW | SNM | CLT; 20 | | | 29th | 55 | |
| 2014 | Mike Speeney | 31 | Chevy | CRW; 13 | SNM | SBO | LGY | CRW | BGS | BRI | LGY | CRW | SBO | SNM | CRW | CRW | CLT | 28th | 31 | |

=== CARS Pro Late Model Tour ===
(key)

CARS Pro Late Model Tour results
| Year | Team | No. | Make | 1 | 2 | 3 | 4 | 5 | 6 | 7 | 8 | 9 | 10 | 11 | 12 | 13 | CPLMTC | Pts | Ref |
|---|---|---|---|---|---|---|---|---|---|---|---|---|---|---|---|---|---|---|---|
| 2025 | Rick Ware Racing | 51 | Ford | AAS | CDL | OCS | ACE | NWS | CRW; 5 | HCY | HCY | AND | FLC; 12 | SBO | TCM | NWS | 28th | 69 | |

=== ASA STARS National Tour ===
(key) (Bold – Pole position awarded by qualifying time. Italics – Pole position earned by points standings or practice time. * – Most laps led. ** – All laps led.)

ASA STARS National Tour results
| Year | Team | No. | Make | 1 | 2 | 3 | 4 | 5 | 6 | 7 | 8 | 9 | 10 | 11 | 12 | ASNTC | Pts | Ref |
|---|---|---|---|---|---|---|---|---|---|---|---|---|---|---|---|---|---|---|
| 2025 | Rick Ware Racing | 51W | Ford | NSM; 27 | FIF | DOM | HCY | NPS | MAD | SLG | AND | OWO | TOL | WIN | NSV | 74th | 25 | |

=== Complete WeatherTech SportsCar Championship results ===
(key) (Races in bold indicate pole position; races in italics indicate fastest lap)

| Year | Entrant | Class | Make | Engine | 1 | 2 | 3 | 4 | 5 | 6 | 7 | Rank | Points |
|---|---|---|---|---|---|---|---|---|---|---|---|---|---|
| 2021 | RWR Eurasia | LMP2 | Ligier JS P217 | Gibson GK428 4.2 L V8 | DAY; 4† | SEB | WGL | WGL | ELK | LGA | PET | NC† | 0† |

^{†} Points only counted towards the Michelin Endurance Cup, and not the overall LMP2 Championship.

=== 24 Hours of Daytona results ===
| Year | Team | Co-drivers | Car | Class | Laps | Pos. | Class Pos. |
|---|---|---|---|---|---|---|---|
| 2021 | (United States) RWR Eurasia | (United States) Austin Dillon (Germany) Sven Müller (Turkey) Salih Yoluç | Ligier JS P217 | LMP2 | 778 | 10th | 4th |

=== Asian Le Mans Series results ===
(key) (Races in bold indicate pole position) (Races in italics indicate fastest lap)

| Year | Entrant | Class | Make | Engine | 1 | 2 | 3 | 4 | Pos | Points |
|---|---|---|---|---|---|---|---|---|---|---|
| 2019–20 | Rick Ware Racing | LMP2 Am | Ligier JS P2 | Nissan VK45DE 4.5 L V8 | SHA; 2 | BEN; 1 | SEP; 1 | CHA; 2 | 1st | 86 |

=== American open-wheel racing results ===
(key)

==== IndyCar Series ====
(key)

| Year | Team | No. | Chassis | Engine | 1 | 2 | 3 | 4 | 5 | 6 | 7 | 8 | 9 | 10 | 11 | 12 | 13 | 14 | 15 | 16 | Rank | Points | Ref |
|---|---|---|---|---|---|---|---|---|---|---|---|---|---|---|---|---|---|---|---|---|---|---|---|
| 2021 | Dale Coyne Racing with Rick Ware Racing | 52 | Dallara DW12 | Honda | ALA | STP | TXS | TXS | IMS | INDY | DET | DET | ROA; 19 | MOH | NSH; 20 | IMS; 25 | GTW | POR | LAG | LBH | 34th | 26 | |
