= 2022 Hollywood Casino 400 =

NASCAR Cup Series race

Race details
- Race 28 of 36 in the 2022 NASCAR Cup Series
- The 2022 Hollywood Casino 400 program cover.
- Date: September 11, 2022
- Location: Kansas Speedway in Kansas City, Kansas
- Course: Permanent racing facility
- Course length: 1.5 miles (2.4 km)
- Distance: 267 laps, 400.5 mi (640.8 km)
- Average speed: 126.44 miles per hour (203.49 km/h)

Pole position
Driver	Tyler Reddick	Richard Childress Racing
- Time: 29.899

Most laps led
Driver	Alex Bowman	Hendrick Motorsports
- Laps: 107

Winner
No. 45	Bubba Wallace	23XI Racing

Television in the United States
- Network: USA
- Announcers: Rick Allen, Jeff Burton, Steve Letarte and Dale Earnhardt Jr.

Radio in the United States
- Radio: MRN
- Booth announcers: Alex Hayden, Jeff Striegle and Todd Gordon
- Turn announcers: Dave Moody (1 & 2) and Mike Bagley (3 & 4)

The 2022 Hollywood Casino 400 was a NASCAR Cup Series race held on September 11, 2022, at Kansas Speedway in Kansas City, Kansas. Contested over 267 laps on the 1.5 mi (2.4 km) intermediate speedway, it was the 28th race of the 2022 NASCAR Cup Series season, second race of the Playoffs, and the second race of the Round of 16.

== Report ==
=== Background ===
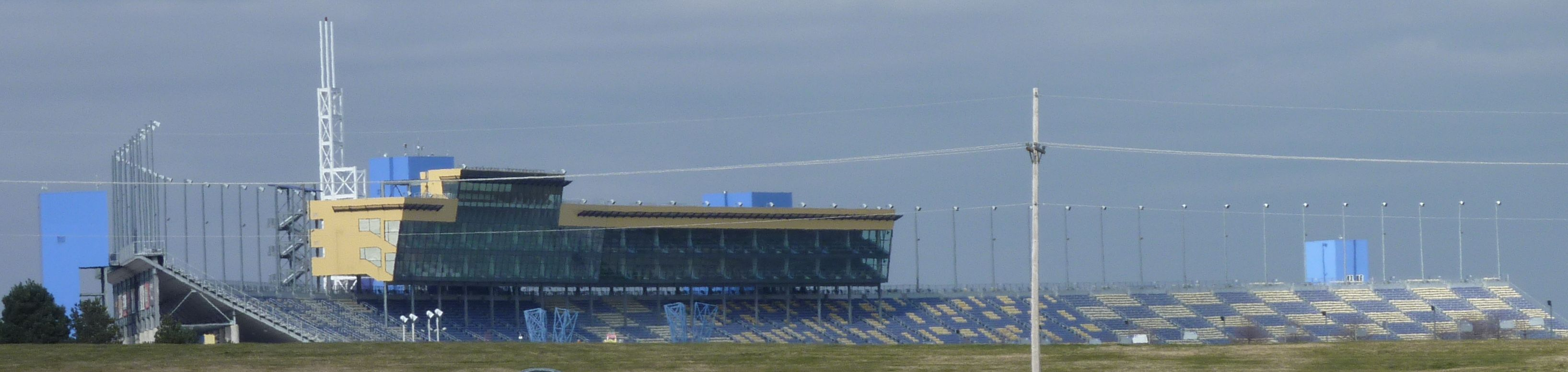
Kansas Speedway, the track where the race was held.

Kansas Speedway is a 1.5-mile (2.4 km) tri-oval race track in Kansas City, Kansas. It was built in 2001 and it currently hosts two annual NASCAR race weekends. The IndyCar Series also raced at here until 2011. The speedway is owned and operated by the International Speedway Corporation.

==== Entry list ====
- (R) denotes rookie driver.
- (i) denotes driver who is ineligible for series driver points.

No.	Driver	Team	Manufacturer
1	Ross Chastain	Trackhouse Racing Team	Chevrolet
2	Austin Cindric (R)	Team Penske	Ford
3	Austin Dillon	Richard Childress Racing	Chevrolet
4	Kevin Harvick	Stewart-Haas Racing	Ford
5	Kyle Larson	Hendrick Motorsports	Chevrolet
6	Brad Keselowski	RFK Racing	Ford
7	Corey LaJoie	Spire Motorsports	Chevrolet
8	Tyler Reddick	Richard Childress Racing	Chevrolet
9	Chase Elliott	Hendrick Motorsports	Chevrolet
10	Aric Almirola	Stewart-Haas Racing	Ford
11	Denny Hamlin	Joe Gibbs Racing	Toyota
12	Ryan Blaney	Team Penske	Ford
14	Chase Briscoe	Stewart-Haas Racing	Ford
15	J. J. Yeley (i)	Rick Ware Racing	Ford
16	Noah Gragson (i)	Kaulig Racing	Chevrolet
17	Chris Buescher	RFK Racing	Ford
18	Kyle Busch	Joe Gibbs Racing	Toyota
19	Martin Truex Jr.	Joe Gibbs Racing	Toyota
20	Christopher Bell	Joe Gibbs Racing	Toyota
21	Harrison Burton (R)	Wood Brothers Racing	Ford
22	Joey Logano	Team Penske	Ford
23	Ty Gibbs (i)	23XI Racing	Toyota
24	William Byron	Hendrick Motorsports	Chevrolet
31	Justin Haley	Kaulig Racing	Chevrolet
34	Michael McDowell	Front Row Motorsports	Ford
38	Todd Gilliland (R)	Front Row Motorsports	Ford
41	Cole Custer	Stewart-Haas Racing	Ford
42	Ty Dillon	Petty GMS Motorsports	Chevrolet
43	Erik Jones	Petty GMS Motorsports	Chevrolet
45	Bubba Wallace	23XI Racing	Toyota
47	Ricky Stenhouse Jr.	JTG Daugherty Racing	Chevrolet
48	Alex Bowman	Hendrick Motorsports	Chevrolet
51	Cody Ware	Rick Ware Racing	Ford
77	Landon Cassill (i)	Spire Motorsports	Chevrolet
78	B. J. McLeod (i)	Live Fast Motorsports	Ford
99	Daniel Suárez	Trackhouse Racing Team	Chevrolet
Official entry list

== Practice ==
Tyler Reddick was the fastest in the practice session with a time of 30.184 seconds and a speed of 178.903 mph (287.916 km/h).

=== Practice results ===
Pos	No.	Driver	Team	Manufacturer	Time	Speed
1	8	Tyler Reddick	Richard Childress Racing	Chevrolet	30.184	178.903
2	1	Ross Chastain	Trackhouse Racing Team	Chevrolet	30.266	178.418
3	20	Christopher Bell	Joe Gibbs Racing	Toyota	30.267	178.412
Official practice results

== Qualifying ==
Tyler Reddick scored the pole for the race with a time of 29.899 and a speed of 180.608 mph (290.660 km/h).

=== Qualifying results ===
Pos	No.	Driver	Team	Manufacturer	R1	R2
1	8	Tyler Reddick	Richard Childress Racing	Chevrolet	29.853	29.899
2	22	Joey Logano	Team Penske	Ford	29.915	29.936
3	48	Alex Bowman	Hendrick Motorsports	Chevrolet	29.960	29.964
4	20	Christopher Bell	Joe Gibbs Racing	Toyota	30.080	30.057
5	1	Ross Chastain	Trackhouse Racing Team	Chevrolet	29.870	30.066
6	45	Bubba Wallace	23XI Racing	Toyota	30.170	30.124
7	5	Kyle Larson	Hendrick Motorsports	Chevrolet	30.225	30.142
8	2	Austin Cindric (R)	Team Penske	Ford	30.123	30.158
9	24	William Byron	Hendrick Motorsports	Chevrolet	30.010	30.180
10	17	Chris Buescher	RFK Racing	Ford	30.262	30.266
11	3	Austin Dillon	Richard Childress Racing	Chevrolet	30.051	—
12	19	Martin Truex Jr.	Joe Gibbs Racing	Toyota	30.105	—
13	14	Chase Briscoe	Stewart-Haas Racing	Ford	30.129	—
14	4	Kevin Harvick	Stewart-Haas Racing	Ford	30.177	—
15	99	Daniel Suárez	Trackhouse Racing Team	Chevrolet	30.200	—
16	23	Ty Gibbs (i)	23XI Racing	Toyota	30.362	—
17	12	Ryan Blaney	Team Penske	Ford	30.396	—
18	21	Harrison Burton (R)	Wood Brothers Racing	Ford	30.419	—
19	7	Corey LaJoie	Spire Motorsports	Chevrolet	30.434	—
20	18	Kyle Busch	Joe Gibbs Racing	Toyota	30.479	—
21	42	Ty Dillon	Petty GMS Motorsports	Chevrolet	30.493	—
22	9	Chase Elliott	Hendrick Motorsports	Chevrolet	30.517	—
23	34	Michael McDowell	Front Row Motorsports	Ford	30.576	—
24	43	Erik Jones	Petty GMS Motorsports	Chevrolet	30.630	—
25	11	Denny Hamlin	Joe Gibbs Racing	Toyota	30.633	—
26	6	Brad Keselowski	RFK Racing	Ford	30.645	—
27	31	Justin Haley	Kaulig Racing	Chevrolet	30.658	—
28	16	Noah Gragson (i)	Kaulig Racing	Chevrolet	30.673	—
29	41	Cole Custer	Stewart-Haas Racing	Ford	30.745	—
30	51	Cody Ware	Rick Ware Racing	Ford	30.885	—
31	77	Landon Cassill (i)	Spire Motorsports	Chevrolet	30.901	—
32	38	Todd Gilliland (R)	Front Row Motorsports	Ford	30.913	—
33	15	J. J. Yeley (i)	Rick Ware Racing	Ford	31.064	—
34	78	B. J. McLeod (i)	Live Fast Motorsports	Ford	31.528	—
35	47	Ricky Stenhouse Jr.	JTG Daugherty Racing	Chevrolet	31.906	—
36	10	Aric Almirola	Stewart-Haas Racing	Ford	0.000	—
Official qualifying results

== Race ==
=== Stage Results ===
Stage One Laps: 80

Pos	No	Driver	Team	Manufacturer	Points
1	20	Christopher Bell	Joe Gibbs Racing	Toyota	10
2	12	Ryan Blaney	Team Penske	Ford	9
3	19	Martin Truex Jr.	Joe Gibbs Racing	Toyota	8
4	47	Ricky Stenhouse Jr.	JTG Daugherty Racing	Chevrolet	7
5	45	Bubba Wallace	23XI Racing	Toyota	6
6	9	Chase Elliott	Hendrick Motorsports	Chevrolet	5
7	18	Kyle Busch	Joe Gibbs Racing	Toyota	4
8	1	Ross Chastain	Trackhouse Racing Team	Chevrolet	3
9	22	Joey Logano	Team Penske	Ford	2
10	3	Austin Dillon	Richard Childress Racing	Chevrolet	1
Official stage one results

Stage Two Laps: 85

Pos	No	Driver	Team	Manufacturer	Points
1	48	Alex Bowman	Hendrick Motorsports	Chevrolet	10
2	20	Christopher Bell	Joe Gibbs Racing	Toyota	9
3	24	William Byron	Hendrick Motorsports	Chevrolet	8
4	45	Bubba Wallace	23XI Racing	Toyota	7
5	9	Chase Elliott	Hendrick Motorsports	Chevrolet	6
6	11	Denny Hamlin	Joe Gibbs Racing	Toyota	5
7	5	Kyle Larson	Hendrick Motorsports	Chevrolet	4
8	22	Joey Logano	Team Penske	Ford	3
9	12	Ryan Blaney	Team Penske	Ford	2
10	1	Ross Chastain	Trackhouse Racing Team	Chevrolet	1
Official stage two results

=== Final Stage Results ===
Stage Three Laps: 102

Pos	Grid	No	Driver	Team	Manufacturer	Laps	Points
1	6	45	Bubba Wallace	23XI Racing	Toyota	267	53
2	25	11	Denny Hamlin	Joe Gibbs Racing	Toyota	267	40
3	4	20	Christopher Bell	Joe Gibbs Racing	Toyota	267	53
4	3	48	Alex Bowman	Hendrick Motorsports	Chevrolet	267	43
5	12	19	Martin Truex Jr.	Joe Gibbs Racing	Toyota	267	40
6	9	24	William Byron	Hendrick Motorsports	Chevrolet	267	39
7	5	1	Ross Chastain	Trackhouse Racing Team	Chevrolet	267	34
8	7	5	Kyle Larson	Hendrick Motorsports	Chevrolet	267	33
9	17	12	Ryan Blaney	Team Penske	Ford	267	39
10	15	99	Daniel Suárez	Trackhouse Racing Team	Chevrolet	267	27
11	22	9	Chase Elliott	Hendrick Motorsports	Chevrolet	267	37
12	8	2	Austin Cindric (R)	Team Penske	Ford	267	25
13	13	14	Chase Briscoe	Stewart-Haas Racing	Ford	267	24
14	11	3	Austin Dillon	Richard Childress Racing	Chevrolet	267	24
15	10	17	Chris Buescher	RFK Racing	Ford	267	22
16	23	34	Michael McDowell	Front Row Motorsports	Ford	267	21
17	2	22	Joey Logano	Team Penske	Ford	266	25
18	28	16	Noah Gragson (i)	Kaulig Racing	Chevrolet	266	0
19	27	31	Justin Haley	Kaulig Racing	Chevrolet	266	18
20	21	42	Ty Dillon	Petty GMS Motorsports	Chevrolet	266	17
21	36	10	Aric Almirola	Stewart-Haas Racing	Ford	266	16
22	29	41	Cole Custer	Stewart-Haas Racing	Ford	266	15
23	32	38	Todd Gilliland (R)	Front Row Motorsports	Ford	266	14
24	31	77	Landon Cassill (i)	Spire Motorsports	Chevrolet	266	0
25	26	6	Brad Keselowski	RFK Racing	Ford	266	12
26	20	18	Kyle Busch	Joe Gibbs Racing	Toyota	265	15
27	30	51	Cody Ware	Rick Ware Racing	Ford	265	10
28	33	15	J. J. Yeley (i)	Rick Ware Racing	Ford	264	0
29	24	43	Erik Jones	Petty GMS Motorsports	Chevrolet	264	8
30	35	47	Ricky Stenhouse Jr.	JTG Daugherty Racing	Chevrolet	262	14
31	34	78	B. J. McLeod (i)	Live Fast Motorsports	Ford	262	0
32	18	21	Harrison Burton (R)	Wood Brothers Racing	Ford	115	5
33	19	7	Corey LaJoie	Spire Motorsports	Chevrolet	114	4
34	16	23	Ty Gibbs (i)	23XI Racing	Toyota	90	0
35	1	8	Tyler Reddick	Richard Childress Racing	Chevrolet	67	2
36	14	4	Kevin Harvick	Stewart-Haas Racing	Ford	32	1
Official race results

=== Race statistics ===
- Lead changes: 16 among 12 different drivers
- Cautions/Laps: 9 for 43
- Red flags: 0
- Time of race: 3 hours, 10 minutes and 3 seconds
- Average speed: 126.44 miles per hour (203.49 km/h)

== Media ==
=== Television ===
USA covered the race on the television side. Rick Allen, Jeff Burton, Steve Letarte and Dale Earnhardt Jr. called the race from the broadcast booth. Dave Burns, Kim Coon and Parker Kligerman handled the pit road duties from pit lane.

USA
Booth announcers	Pit reporters
Lap-by-lap: Rick Allen; Color-commentator: Jeff Burton; Color-commentator: Steve Letarte; Color-commentator: Dale Earnhardt Jr.	Dave Burns; Kim Coon; Parker Kligerman

=== Radio ===
MRN had the radio call for the race, which was also simulcast on Sirius XM NASCAR Radio. Alex Hayden, Jeff Striegle and Todd Gordon called the race for MRN when the field raced thru the front straightaway. Dave Moody called the race for MRN from Turns 1 & 2, and Mike Bagley called the race for MRN from turns 3 & 4. Steve Post, Jason Toy & Brienne Pedigo covered the action for MRN from pit lane.

MRN
Booth announcers	Turn announcers	Pit reporters
Lead announcer: Alex Hayden; Announcer: Jeff Striegle; Announcer: Todd Gordon	Turns 1 & 2: Dave Moody; Turns 3 & 4: Mike Bagley	Steve Post; Jason Toy; Brienne Pedigo

== Standings after the race ==
Drivers' Championship standings

	Pos	Driver	Points
3	1	Christopher Bell	2,108
	2	William Byron	2,098 (–10)
	3	Denny Hamlin	2,097 (–11)
3	4	Joey Logano	2,090 (–18)
1	5	Ryan Blaney	2,086 (–22)
4	6	Alex Bowman	2,080 (–28)
2	7	Chase Elliott	2,078 (–30)
1	8	Kyle Larson	2,077 (–31)
1	9	Ross Chastain	2,076 (–32)
2	10	Daniel Suárez	2,056 (–52)
6	11	Tyler Reddick	2,052 (–56)
1	12	Austin Cindric	2,052 (–56)
2	13	Kyle Busch	2,050 (–58)
	14	Austin Dillon	2,049 (–59)
	15	Chase Briscoe	2,043 (–65)
	16	Kevin Harvick	2,017 (–91)
Official driver's standings

Christopher Bell (No. 20 Joe Gibbs Racing) has advanced on points in the driver's and owner's championship.
The No. 45 23XI Racing team has advanced with the team win in the owner's championship.

Manufacturers' Championship standings

Pos	Manufacturer	Points
1	Chevrolet	1,032
2	Toyota	959 (–73)
3	Ford	921 (–111)

- Note: Only the first 16 positions are included for the driver standings.

Previous race: 2022 Cook Out Southern 500	NASCAR Cup Series; 2022 season	Next race: 2022 Bass Pro Shops Night Race
