= 2021 Big Machine Spiked Coolers Grand Prix =

12th round of the 2021 IndyCar Series

(United States) 2021 Big Machine Spiked Coolers Grand Prix
Race details
12th round of the 2021 IndyCar season
← Previous race	Next race →
- Layout of the Indianapolis Motor Speedway Road Course
- Date: August 14, 2021
- Official name: Big Machine Spiked Coolers Grand Prix
- Location: Indianapolis Motor Speedway, Speedway, Indiana
- Course: Permanent racing facility 2.439 mi / 3.925 km
- Distance: 85 laps 207.315 mi / 333.641 km

Pole position
- Driver: (Mexico) Pato O'Ward (Arrow McLaren SP)
- Time: 01:10.7147

Fastest lap
- Driver: (Australia) Will Power (Team Penske)
- Time: 01:11.6919 (on lap 16 of 85)

Podium
- First: (Australia) Will Power (Team Penske)
- Second: (France) Romain Grosjean (Dale Coyne Racing with Rick Ware Racing)
- Third: (United States) Colton Herta (Andretti Autosport with Curb-Agajanian)

Chronology
Previous	Next
May 2021	May 2022

The 2021 Big Machine Spiked Coolers Grand Prix was an IndyCar motor race held on August 14, 2021, at the Indianapolis Motor Speedway Road Course. It was the 12th round of the 2021 IndyCar Series. This was also the first meeting at the Speedway since the death of Bob Jenkins. Indianapolis area resident and well-known motorsport broadcaster Jamie Little replaced Jenkins, sharing public address duties with Allen Bestwick. Dave Calabro, who shares duties with Bestwick, does not work the Verizon 200 meeting.

The 85-lap race was won by Team Penske's Will Power, clinching his first win of the season. IndyCar rookie Romain Grosjean finished second, repeating his best ever finish at the time, which was achieved at the same circuit in the GMR Grand Prix. Colton Herta of Andretti Autosport rounded out the podium places with his third-placed finish.

== Background ==
The event was held over two days on August 13–14, 2021 at the road course of the Indianapolis Motor Speedway in Speedway, Indiana. This was the second time the venue featured in the 2021 season, following the GMR Grand Prix in May 2021, and the third edition of this race, as it debuted as an October 2020 doubleheader.

The race was the 12th race of the 16-race calendar, held one week after the Big Machine Music City Grand Prix in Nashville, Tennessee and one week prior to the Bommarito Automotive Group 500.

Rinus VeeKay was the previous race winner, having won the GMR Grand Prix in May 2021.

=== Championship standings before the race ===
Álex Palou stood top of the standings over Scott Dixon, who rose to second after his second-place finish in Nashville. Pato O'Ward was demoted to third following Dixon's rise to second, sitting over Josef Newgarden in fourth and Marcus Ericsson in fifth.

Honda maintained their lead over Chevrolet in the manufacturer's standings.

=== Entrants ===
28 drivers entered the race. Dale Coyne Racing fielded a second entry with Rick Ware Racing for the fourth time in the season, with Cody Ware returning to drive the No. 52 car after his appearance at the previous race.

Top Gun Racing returned to make their IndyCar race debut, after the team failed to qualify for the 2021 Indianapolis 500. Part-time NASCAR Xfinity Series driver R. C. Enerson, who piloted their No. 75 car on their Indy 500 qualifying attempt, returned to drive for the team.

Formula 2 driver and Alpine Academy member Christian Lundgaard made his IndyCar debut, as he was signed by Rahal Letterman Lanigan Racing to drive their No. 45 entry, previously driven by Santino Ferrucci in the Big Machine Music City Grand Prix.

Key	Meaning
R	Rookie
W	Past winner

No.	Driver	Team	Engine
2	(United States) Josef Newgarden W	Team Penske	Chevrolet
3	(New Zealand) Scott McLaughlin R	Team Penske	Chevrolet
4	(Canada) Dalton Kellett	A. J. Foyt Enterprises	Chevrolet
5	(Mexico) Patricio O'Ward	Arrow McLaren SP	Chevrolet
06	(Brazil) Hélio Castroneves	Meyer Shank Racing	Honda
7	(Sweden) Felix Rosenqvist	Arrow McLaren SP	Chevrolet
8	(Sweden) Marcus Ericsson	Chip Ganassi Racing	Honda
9	(New Zealand) Scott Dixon W	Chip Ganassi Racing	Honda
10	(Spain) Álex Palou	Chip Ganassi Racing	Honda
12	(Australia) Will Power W	Team Penske	Chevrolet
14	(France) Sébastien Bourdais	A. J. Foyt Enterprises	Chevrolet
15	(United States) Graham Rahal	Rahal Letterman Lanigan Racing	Honda
18	(United Arab Emirates) Ed Jones	Dale Coyne Racing with Vasser-Sullivan	Honda
20	(United States) Conor Daly	Ed Carpenter Racing	Chevrolet
21	(Netherlands) Rinus VeeKay W	Ed Carpenter Racing	Chevrolet
22	(France) Simon Pagenaud W	Team Penske	Chevrolet
26	(United States) Colton Herta	Andretti Autosport with Curb-Agajanian	Honda
27	(United States) Alexander Rossi	Andretti Autosport	Honda
28	(United States) Ryan Hunter-Reay	Andretti Autosport	Honda
29	(Canada) James Hinchcliffe	Andretti Steinbrenner Autosport	Honda
30	(Japan) Takuma Sato	Rahal Letterman Lanigan Racing	Honda
45	(Denmark) Christian Lundgaard R	Rahal Letterman Lanigan Racing	Honda
48	(United States) Jimmie Johnson R	Chip Ganassi Racing	Honda
51	(France) Romain Grosjean R	Dale Coyne Racing with Rick Ware Racing	Honda
52	(United States) Cody Ware R	Dale Coyne Racing with Rick Ware Racing	Honda
59	(United Kingdom) Max Chilton	Carlin	Chevrolet
60	(United Kingdom) Jack Harvey	Meyer Shank Racing	Honda
75	(United States) R. C. Enerson R	Top Gun Racing	Chevrolet

== Practice ==
Practice 1 took place at 3:00 PM ET on August 13, 2021. The one-hour session was stopped with seven minutes remaining, as Colton Herta stopped at pit exit with a clutch problem and a warning light in his dashboard. Álex Palou was fastest in practice, with a time of 01:10.8839. Previous race winner Rinus VeeKay classified second, while Pato O'Ward finished third.

Top Practice Speeds
Pos	No.	Driver	Team	Engine	Lap Time
1	2	(Spain) Álex Palou	Chip Ganassi Racing	Honda	01:10.8839
2	21	(Netherlands) Rinus VeeKay W	Ed Carpenter Racing	Chevrolet	01:10.9062
3	5	(Mexico) Pato O'Ward	Arrow McLaren SP	Chevrolet	01:10.9267

== Qualifying ==
Because of the compacted schedule as part of the NASCAR-INDYCAR doubleheader, qualifying, which started at 7:00 PM ET on August 13, 2021, was reduced to two rounds, with the third round omitted for time constraints. The six fastest drivers of each group in Round 1 advanced to the Firestone Fast 12, where they competed for pole position. It was the latest time an INDYCAR session had started at the Speedway.

The second session of Round 1 was highlighted by Scott Dixon's spin on his last fast lap, just before the timing line, which by rule cancels his best two laps, and finished 13th in his group, meaning he started 26th. Dalton Kellett, Felix Rosenqvist, and James Hinchcliffe also had their laps deleted, as they failed to slow down during the local yellow that was raised due to Dixon's incident.

Pato O'Ward took pole with a time of 01:10.7147, with Will Power and Romain Grosjean second and third fastest respectively. Rahal Letterman Lanigan's Christian Lundgaard qualified for the second row in his first ever IndyCar appearance.

=== Qualifying classification ===
Pos	No.	Driver	Team	Engine	Time			Final grid
Pos	No.	Driver	Team	Engine	Round 1		Round 2	Final grid
Pos	No.	Driver	Team	Engine	Group 1	Group 2	Round 2	Final grid
1	5	(Mexico) Pato O'Ward	Arrow McLaren SP	Chevrolet	N/A	01:11.2094	**01:10.7147**	1
2	27	(Australia) Will Power	Team Penske	Chevrolet	**01:10.9988**	N/A	01:10.7214	2
3	51	(France) Romain Grosjean **R**	Dale Coyne Racing with Rick Ware Racing	Honda	N/A	01:11.1957	01:10.7418	3
4	45	(Denmark) Christian Lundgaard **R**	Rahal Letterman Lanigan Racing	Honda	N/A	01:11.0511	01:10.7433	4
5	26	(United States) Colton Herta	Andretti Autosport with Curb-Agajanian	Honda	01:11.3896	N/A	01:10.7631	5
6	10	(Spain) Álex Palou	Chip Ganassi Racing	Honda	N/A	01:11.1296	01:10.8290	6
7	60	(United Kingdom) Jack Harvey	Meyer Shank Racing	Honda	01:11.1800	N/A	01:10.8875	7
8	20	(United States) Conor Daly	Ed Carpenter Racing	Chevrolet	01:11.3129	N/A	01:10.9532	8
9	21	(Netherlands) Rinus VeeKay **W**	Ed Carpenter Racing	Chevrolet	01:11.4208	N/A	01:11.0208	9
10	27	(United States) Alexander Rossi	Andretti Autosport	Honda	N/A	**01:10.9867**	01:11.0240	10
11	8	(Sweden) Marcus Ericsson	Chip Ganassi Racing	Honda	N/A	01:11.2510	01:11.0342	11
12	22	(France) Simon Pagenaud **W**	Team Penske	Chevrolet	01:11.3160	N/A	01:11.1346	12
13	28	(United States) Ryan Hunter-Reay	Andretti Autosport	Honda	01:11.5084	N/A	N/A	13
14	2	(United States) Josef Newgarden **W**	Team Penske	Chevrolet	N/A	01:11.3623	N/A	20^{1}
15	14	(France) Sébastien Bourdais	A. J. Foyt Enterprises	Chevrolet	01:11.5504	N/A	N/A	14
16	30	(Japan) Takuma Sato	Rahal Letterman Lanigan Racing	Honda	N/A	01:11.4174	N/A	15
17	15	(United States) Graham Rahal	Rahal Letterman Lanigan Racing	Honda	01:11.5583	N/A	N/A	16
18	18	(United Arab Emirates) Ed Jones	Dale Coyne Racing with Vasser-Sullivan	Honda	N/A	01:11.4360	N/A	17
19	59	(United Kingdom) Max Chilton	Carlin	Chevrolet	01:11.5739	N/A	N/A	18
20	7	(Sweden) Felix Rosenqvist	Arrow McLaren SP	Chevrolet	N/A	01:11.5340	N/A	19
21	3	(New Zealand) Scott McLaughlin **R**	Team Penske	Chevrolet	01:11.6676	N/A	N/A	21
22	48	(United States) Jimmie Johnson **R**	Chip Ganassi Racing	Honda	N/A	01:11.8624	N/A	22
23	06	(Brazil) Hélio Castroneves	Meyer Shank Racing	Honda	01:11.7319	N/A	N/A	23
24	29	(Canada) James Hinchcliffe	Andretti Steinbrenner Autosport	Honda	N/A	01:12.0813	N/A	24
25	75	(United States) R. C. Enerson **R**	Top Gun Racing	Chevrolet	01:12.3344	N/A	N/A	25
26	9	(New Zealand) Scott Dixon **W**	Chip Ganassi Racing	Honda	N/A	01:12.2660	N/A	26
27	52	(United States) Cody Ware **R**	Dale Coyne Racing with Rick Ware Racing	Honda	01:13.7572	N/A	N/A	27
28	4	(Canada) Dalton Kellett	A. J. Foyt Enterprises	Chevrolet	N/A	01:12.5494	N/A	28

Notes

- **Bold text** indicates fastest time set in session.
- **^1** - Josef Newgarden received a six-place grid penalty due to an unapproved engine change.

== Warmup ==
Warmup took place at 8:45 AM ET on August 14, 2021. Marcus Ericsson was fastest with a time of 01:10.8839, ahead of Alexander Rossi in second and Josef Newgarden in third.

Top Warmup Speeds
Pos	No.	Driver	Team	Engine	Lap Time
1	8	(Sweden) Marcus Ericsson	Chip Ganassi Racing	Honda	01:10.8839
2	27	(United States) Alexander Rossi	Andretti Autosport	Honda	01:11.3895
3	2	(United States) Josef Newgarden W	Team Penske	Chevrolet	01:11.4639

== Race ==
The race started at 12:30 PM ET. On the first lap, Scott McLaughlin went airborne after hitting a kerb in Turn 6, however no damage was caused. IndyCar debutant Christian Lundgaard took the lead of the race on lap 16, as the race leaders went to pit. On lap 18, Will Power overtook Pato O'Ward to take the effective lead of the race. Simon Pagenaud would take the lead from Lundgaard on lap 18, as the Danish driver pitted for fresh tyres. Pagenaud would then yield the lead to Power on lap 21, as he made his pit stop. As Pagenaud exited the pits, he emerged in front of Conor Daly, who attempted an overtake on Pagenaud in Turn 7, which failed and sent Daly to the grass, causing him to drop two positions from tenth to 12th. On the following lap, Colton Herta passed O'Ward to take second. O'Ward would continue to drop away from the podium places and eventually finished fifth.

On lap 68, Álex Palou retired from fourth position due to a mechanical failure, bringing out a caution that lasted three laps. He would later classify 27th, scoring only five points. After the race was restarted on lap 70, Romain Grosjean, who was third at the time, outbraked Herta in Turn 1 to take second position. Sébastien Bourdais and Ryan Hunter-Reay made contact on lap 73, sending them both off-track and down the order. The second caution of the day was caused after McLaughlin hit the rear of Rinus VeeKay's car on lap 76, causing VeeKay to spin and stall his vehicle in Turn 7. The caution lasted two laps.

Will Power ended his winless run as he finished first, ahead of Romain Grosjean, who equalled his highest-ever finish in second, and Colton Herta in third.

=== Race classification ===
Pos	No.	Driver	Team	Engine	Laps	Time/Retired	Pit Stops	Grid	Laps Led	Pts.
1	12	(Australia) Will Power W	Team Penske	Chevrolet	85	1:49:38.0811	3	2	56	53
2	51	(France) Romain Grosjean R	Dale Coyne Racing with Rick Ware Racing	Honda	85	+1.1142	3	3		40
3	26	(United States) Colton Herta	Andretti Autosport with Curb-Agajanian	Honda	85	+2.3498	3	5	2	35
4	27	(United States) Alexander Rossi	Andretti Autosport	Honda	85	+3.4382	3	10		32
5	5	(Mexico) Pato O'Ward	Arrow McLaren SP	Chevrolet	85	+4.1052	3	1	16	32
6	60	(United Kingdom) Jack Harvey	Meyer Shank Racing	Honda	85	+5.3233	3	7		28
7	15	(United States) Graham Rahal	Rahal Letterman Lanigan Racing	Honda	85	+5.8553	3	16		26
8	2	(United States) Josef Newgarden W	Team Penske	Chevrolet	85	+6.2497	3	20	2	25
9	8	(Sweden) Marcus Ericsson	Chip Ganassi Racing	Honda	85	+7.0080	3	11		22
10	30	(Japan) Takuma Sato	Rahal Letterman Lanigan Racing	Honda	85	+7.9449	3	15		20
11	20	(United States) Conor Daly	Ed Carpenter Racing	Chevrolet	85	+9.3596	3	8		19
12	45	(Denmark) Christian Lundgaard R	Rahal Letterman Lanigan Racing	Honda	85	+9.8379	3	4	2	19
13	7	(Sweden) Felix Rosenqvist	Arrow McLaren SP	Chevrolet	85	+10.6234	3	19		17
14	18	(United Arab Emirates) Ed Jones	Dale Coyne Racing with Vasser-Sullivan	Honda	85	+12.1199	3	17		16
15	14	(France) Sébastien Bourdais	A. J. Foyt Enterprises	Chevrolet	85	+12.5781	3	14		15
16	22	(France) Simon Pagenaud W	Team Penske	Chevrolet	85	+16.4169	3	12	7	15
17	9	(New Zealand) Scott Dixon W	Chip Ganassi Racing	Honda	85	+17.1924	3	26		13
18	28	(United States) Ryan Hunter-Reay	Andretti Autosport	Honda	85	+17.3273	3	13		12
19	48	(United States) Jimmie Johnson R	Chip Ganassi Racing	Honda	85	+18.1585	3	22		11
20	59	(United Kingdom) Max Chilton	Carlin	Chevrolet	85	+18.7489	3	18		10
21	06	(Brazil) Hélio Castroneves	Meyer Shank Racing	Honda	85	+19.5451	3	23		9
22	29	(Canada) James Hinchcliffe	Andretti Steinbrenner Autosport	Honda	85	+20.8450	3	24		8
23	3	(New Zealand) Scott McLaughlin R	Team Penske	Chevrolet	85	+21.0115	3	21		7
24	21	(Netherlands) Rinus VeeKay W	Ed Carpenter Racing	Chevrolet	85	+22.4946	3	9		6
25	52	(United States) Cody Ware R	Dale Coyne Racing with Rick Ware Racing	Honda	83	+2 Laps	4	27		5
26	4	(Canada) Dalton Kellett	A. J. Foyt Enterprises	Chevrolet	81	+4 Laps	4	28		5
27	10	(Spain) Álex Palou	Chip Ganassi Racing	Honda	67	Mechanical	3	6		5
28	75	(United States) R. C. Enerson R	Top Gun Racing	Chevrolet	12	Mechanical	2	25		5
Fastest lap: (Australia) Will Power (Team Penske) – 01:11.6919 (lap 16)

== Championship standings after the race ==
Points leader Álex Palou saw his championship lead cut due to his 27th-place finish, as Pato O'Ward moved up to second – at Scott Dixon's expense, as he moved down to third.

Drivers' Championship standings

	Pos.	Driver	Points
Unchanged	1	(Spain) Álex Palou	415
1	2	(Mexico) Pato O'Ward	394
1	3	(New Zealand) Scott Dixon	381
Unchanged	4	(United States) Josef Newgarden	360
Unchanged	5	(Sweden) Marcus Ericsson	353

Engine manufacturer standings

	Pos.	Manufacturer	Points
Unchanged	1	Honda	1034
Unchanged	2	Chevrolet	966

- Note: Only the top five positions are included.

Previous race: Music City Grand Prix	IndyCar Series; 2020 season	Next race: 2021 Bommarito Automotive Group 500
Previous race: 2020 IndyCar Grand Prix	INDYCAR Grand Prix (NASCAR)	Next race: 2022 Gallagher Grand Prix
