= Top Gun Racing =

IndyCar Series team

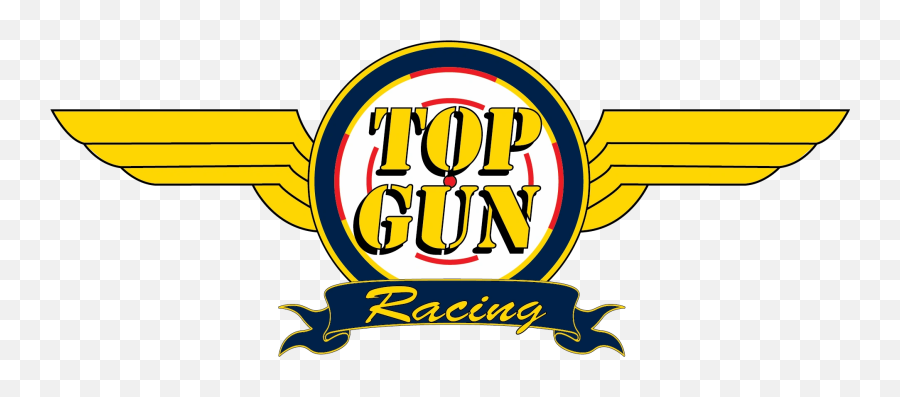
- Owner(s): Bill Throckmorton; Stephanie Throckmorton
- Base: Brownsburg, Indiana, United States
- Series: IndyCar Series
- Manufacturer: Chevrolet

Career
- Debut: 2021
- Races competed: 1
- Drivers' Championships: 0
- Indy 500 victories: 0
- Race victories: 0
- Pole positions: 0

Top Gun Racing was an American auto racing team that competed in the IndyCar Series entering the #75 Dallara UAK18-Chevrolet Indy V6 on a part-time basis.

== History ==
=== 2020 ===
Top Gun announced that they would start to compete in IndyCar in 2020, with R.C. Enerson driving the #99 Hagerty Dallara UAK18-Chevrolet Indy V6 at the Indianapolis 500.

Following the announcement that the race would be held with a limited spectator crowd, due to the ongoing coronavirus pandemic, Top Gun announced that they would not compete at the 500, as their partners wanted a full capacity event to be involved with. However, the team did say that they and Enerson would compete at the IndyCar Harvest Grand Prix at Indianapolis Motor Speedway and the Firestone Grand Prix of St. Petersburg on the Streets of St. Petersburg. Ultimately, they did not enter these races.

=== 2021 ===
For 2021, Top Gun participated in a test at World Wide Technology Raceway in May, with Enerson driving the #75 Dallara-Chevrolet, which had a throwback livery to the Johnny Lightning-sponsored cars that Al Unser and Vel’s Parnelli Jones Racing used to win the Indianapolis 500 in 1970. Following this, they officially entered the Indianapolis 500. The team used two chassis' owned by the driver (R. C. Enerson) and his father Neil Enerson. The deal struck between the Enerson's and the team included the loan of the two chassis' as well as the use of an Enerson-owned race transporter and other race equipment, with the agreement that all would be returned to the Enerson's at the end of the season.

Entering qualifying, Enerson had completed only 83 laps (the second lowest was Santino Ferrucci with 144 laps). On the first qualifying day, Enerson posted a four lap average speed of 227.283 miles per hour, which was not fast enough to make the top 30 and guarantee a starting position. He later went out for another attempt, but waived off after the first lap speed was 227.410 miles per hour.

Enerson then participated in the Last Row Shootout the following day, as one of five drivers who was not qualified in the top 30. He would post an average speed of 227.298 miles per hour, which was the 34th fastest speed, meaning he was too slow to qualify. The team made adjustments to the car, which was not approved under the penalty of having the speed (which was already not in the field) removed. Afterwards, Enerson made another attempt and had an average speed of 226.813 miles per hour, which was ultimately the 35th fastest speed, meaning that Top Gun failed to qualify.

The team and Enerson would return at the Big Machine Spiked Coolers Grand Prix at Indianapolis. Additionally, they sought out applications for small sponsors on the car, which would go on brick decals (like the ones on the start/finish line at Indianapolis). Enerson would qualify in 25th place (out of 28 cars) for Top Gun's debut race. In the race itself, Enerson retired due to a throttle sensor issue after 12 laps, causing him to finish in last place.

The team reneged on its agreement with the Enerson's to return the two chassis' and other equipment at the end of the season and legal proceedings were required to establish the ownership of the cars. The two chassis' and the rest of the equipment was returned to the Enersons in early May 2022.

== Results summary ==
=== Complete IndyCar Series results ===
(key)

Year	Chassis	Engine	Drivers	No.	1	2	3	4	5	6	7	8	9	10	11	12	13	14	15	16
2021					ALA	STP	TXS		IMS	INDY	DET		ROA	MDO	NSH	IMS	GAT	POR	LAG	LBH
2021	Dallara DW12	Chevrolet IndyCar V6t	(United States) R.C. Enerson	75						DNQ						28				
