= 2021 IndyCar Series =

American auto racing season

2021 IndyCar season
- NTT IndyCar Series

Season
- Races: 16
- Start date: April 18
- End date: September 26

Awards
- Drivers' champion: (Spain) Álex Palou
- Manufacturers' Cup: (Japan) Honda
- Rookie of the Year: (New Zealand) Scott McLaughlin
- Indianapolis 500 winner: (Brazil) Hélio Castroneves

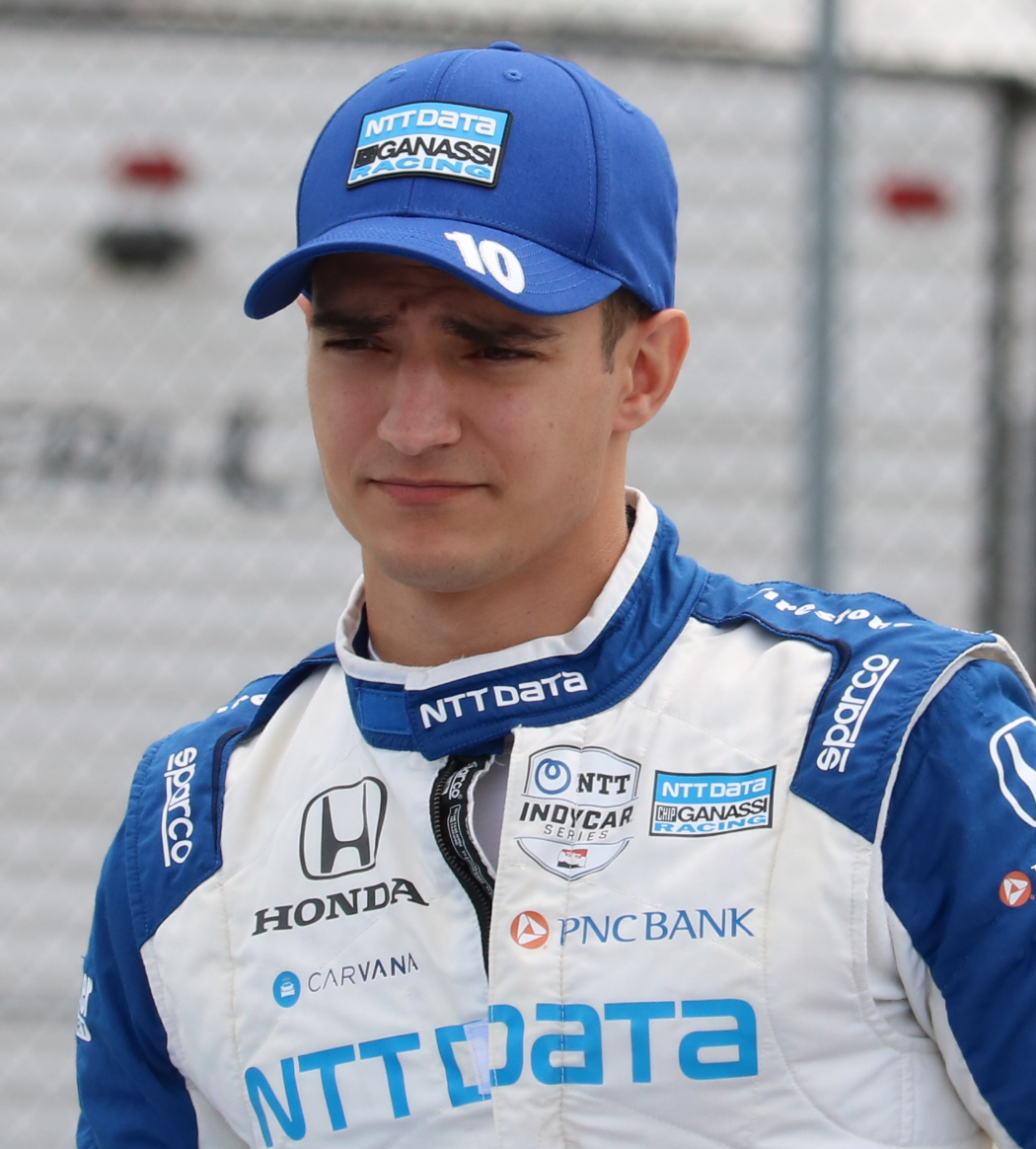
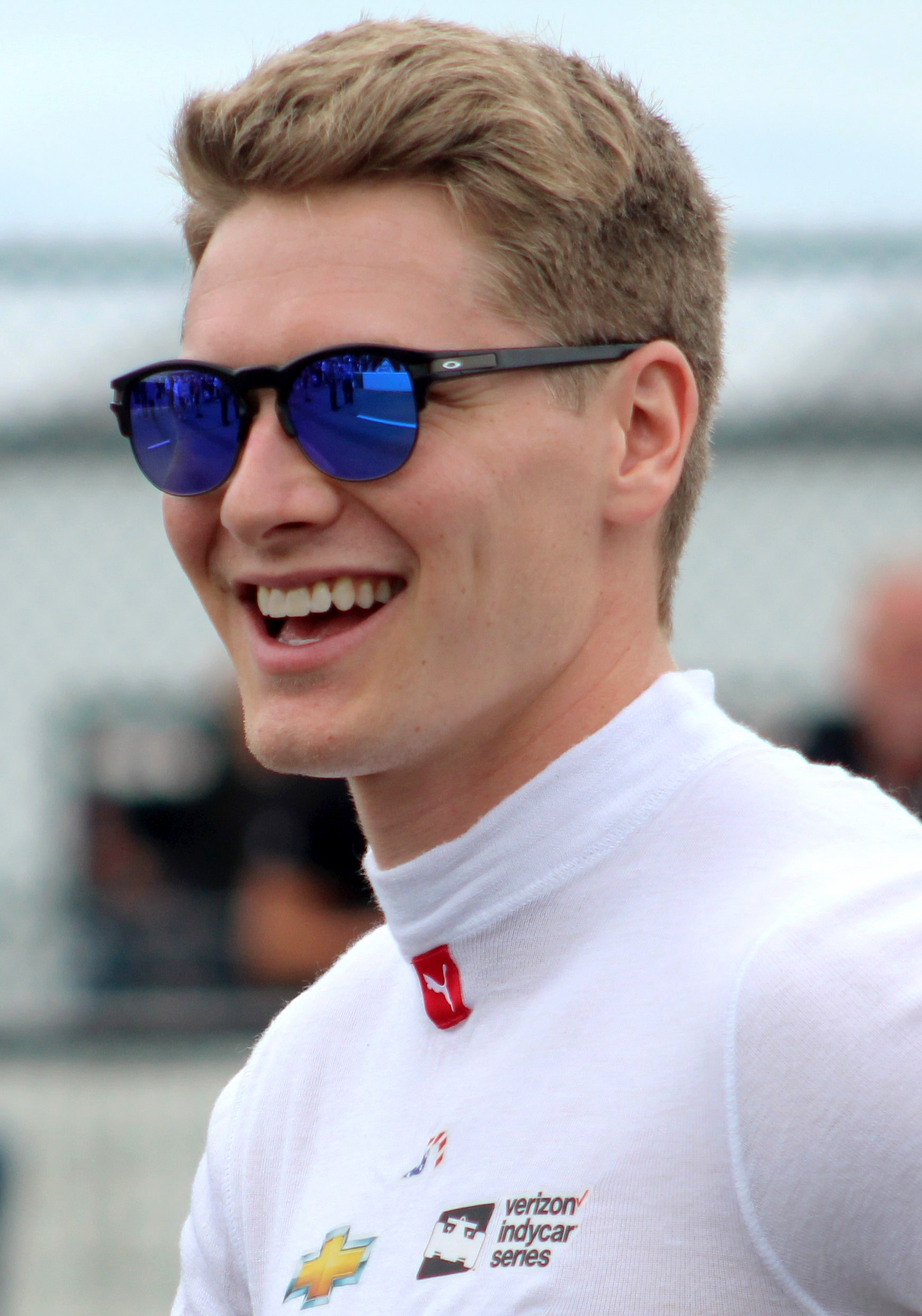
Álex Palou (left) won his first driver's championship, Josef Newgarden (right), finished second in points.

The 2021 NTT IndyCar Series was the 26th season of the IndyCar Series and the 110th official championship season of American open-wheel racing. The premier event was the 2021 Indianapolis 500, won by Hélio Castroneves (Meyer Shank Racing). It was the second year under Penske management after they took over in late 2019. Scott Dixon (Chip Ganassi Racing) entered his 21st season competing for a National Championship as the defending champion, but ultimately finished the campaign in fourth place.

Second-year driver Álex Palou became the first Spanish driver to win the series championship, winning a joint-most three races during the campaign for Chip Ganassi Racing. He finished 38 points clear of Team Penske's Josef Newgarden, who won two races, and finished second in points for the second year in succession. Third place in the championship went to Pato O'Ward of Arrow McLaren SP, who like Newgarden, won two races during the season. A total of nine drivers won races during the season, with Colton Herta (Andretti Autosport) also winning three races. The Manufacturers' Cup was won by Honda for the fourth consecutive season, while Scott McLaughlin (Team Penske) won Rookie of the Year honors.

== Background ==
2021 was to be the final season that the Dallara DW12 UAK18 and Dallara DW12 chassis package (which debuted in 2012 and 2018 respectively) was to be used in competition. It was also scheduled to be the final season for the 2.2-litre V6 twin-turbocharged engine package that debuted in 2012; in October 2020, this was delayed for an additional season, as a consequence of the COVID-19 pandemic.

== Confirmed entries ==
The following teams, entries, and drivers have been announced to compete in the 2021 NTT IndyCar Series season. All teams will use a spec Dallara DW12 chassis with UAK18 aero kit and Firestone tires.

Team	Engine	No.	Driver(s)	Round(s)
A. J. Foyt Enterprises	Chevrolet	1	(United States) J. R. Hildebrand	6
A. J. Foyt Enterprises	Chevrolet	4	(Canada) Dalton Kellett	All
A. J. Foyt Enterprises	Chevrolet	11	(United States) Charlie Kimball	5–6, 16
A. J. Foyt Enterprises	Chevrolet	14	(France) Sébastien Bourdais	All
Andretti Autosport	Honda	25	(United Kingdom) Stefan Wilson R (Note: Stefan Wilson was considered a rookie in the IndyCar Series, as he had contested less than eight IndyCar races in his career. He was not denoted as a rookie in the 2021 Indianapolis 500, as he competed in the race in 2016 and 2018.)	6
Andretti Autosport	Honda	27	(United States) Alexander Rossi	All
Andretti Autosport	Honda	28	(United States) Ryan Hunter-Reay	All
Andretti Autosport	Honda	26	(United States) Colton Herta	1–4
Andretti Autosport w/ Curb-Agajanian	Honda	26	(United States) Colton Herta	5–16
Andretti Steinbrenner Autosport	Honda	29	(Canada) James Hinchcliffe	All
Andretti Herta-Haupert w/ Marco & Curb-Agajanian	Honda	98	(United States) Marco Andretti	6
Arrow McLaren SP	Chevrolet	5	(Mexico) Pato O'Ward	All
Arrow McLaren SP	Chevrolet	7	(Sweden) Felix Rosenqvist	1–7, 10–16
Arrow McLaren SP	Chevrolet	7	(United States) Oliver Askew	8
Arrow McLaren SP	Chevrolet	7	(Denmark) Kevin Magnussen R	9
Arrow McLaren SP	Chevrolet	86	(Colombia) Juan Pablo Montoya	5–6
Carlin	Chevrolet	59	(United Kingdom) Max Chilton	1–2, 6–12, 14–16
Carlin	Chevrolet	59	(United States) Conor Daly	3–4, 13
Chip Ganassi Racing	Honda	8	(Sweden) Marcus Ericsson	All
Chip Ganassi Racing	Honda	9	(New Zealand) Scott Dixon	All
Chip Ganassi Racing	Honda	10	(Spain) Álex Palou	All
Chip Ganassi Racing	Honda	48	(United States) Jimmie Johnson R	1–2, 5, 7–12, 14–16
Chip Ganassi Racing	Honda	48	(Brazil) Tony Kanaan	3–4, 6, 13
Dale Coyne Racing with Rick Ware Racing	Honda	51	(France) Romain Grosjean R	1–2, 5, 7–16
Dale Coyne Racing with Rick Ware Racing	Honda	51	(Brazil) Pietro Fittipaldi	3–4, 6
Dale Coyne Racing with Rick Ware Racing	Honda	52	(United States) Cody Ware R	9, 11–12
Dale Coyne Racing with Rick Ware Racing	Honda	52	(United States) Ryan Norman R	10
Dale Coyne Racing with Vasser Sullivan	Honda	18	(United Arab Emirates) Ed Jones	All
Dreyer & Reinbold Racing	Chevrolet	24	(United States) Sage Karam	6
Ed Carpenter Racing	Chevrolet	20	(United States) Conor Daly	1–2, 5, 7–12, 14–16
Ed Carpenter Racing	Chevrolet	20	(United States) Ed Carpenter	3–4, 6, 13
Ed Carpenter Racing	Chevrolet	21	(Netherlands) Rinus VeeKay	1–8, 10–16
Ed Carpenter Racing	Chevrolet	21	(United States) Oliver Askew	9
Ed Carpenter Racing	Chevrolet	47	(United States) Conor Daly	6
Juncos Hollinger Racing	Chevrolet	77	(United Kingdom) Callum Ilott R	14–16
Meyer Shank Racing (Note: Technical partnership with Andretti Autosport.)	Honda	06	(Brazil) Hélio Castroneves	6, 11–12, 14–16
Meyer Shank Racing	Honda	60	(United Kingdom) Jack Harvey	All
Paretta Autosport (Note: Technical partnership with Team Penske.)	Chevrolet	16	(Switzerland) Simona de Silvestro	6
Rahal Letterman Lanigan Racing	Honda	15	(United States) Graham Rahal	All
Rahal Letterman Lanigan Racing	Honda	30	(Japan) Takuma Sato	All
Rahal Letterman Lanigan Racing	Honda	45	(United States) Santino Ferrucci	6–8, 10–11
Rahal Letterman Lanigan Racing	Honda	45	(Denmark) Christian Lundgaard R	12
Rahal Letterman Lanigan Racing	Honda	45	(United States) Oliver Askew	14–16
Team Penske	Chevrolet	2	(United States) Josef Newgarden	All
Team Penske	Chevrolet	3	(New Zealand) Scott McLaughlin R	All
Team Penske	Chevrolet	12	(Australia) Will Power	All
Team Penske	Chevrolet	22	(France) Simon Pagenaud	All
Top Gun Racing	Chevrolet	75	(United States) R. C. Enerson R	6, 12

R Eligible for Rookie of the Year

=== Driver changes ===
- Seven-time NASCAR Cup Series champion Jimmie Johnson partnered with Chip Ganassi Racing to finalize sponsorship on a program to run all of IndyCar's road/street courses in 2021–2022. On October 24, 2020, the car number and primary sponsor for Johnson's car were announced, respectively the No. 48 (Johnson's long-time NASCAR number, with Hendrick Motorsports, and a number Ganassi had previously fielded in the Xfinity Series) and Carvana.
- A. J. Foyt Enterprises signed Sébastien Bourdais to drive the No. 14 entry full-time in the 2021 season. Bourdais also drove the No. 14 for the final three races of 2020.
- Arrow McLaren SP announced that Oliver Askew, who had driven the No. 7 car in 2020, would not return to the team for the 2021 season. Felix Rosenqvist moved from Chip Ganassi Racing to replace Askew. Askew came back to the No. 7 car for the second race in Detroit, as Rosenqvist was hospitalized after an accident in the weekend's first race. Rosenqvist was then replaced for the next race at Road America by former Formula One and Haas reserve driver Kevin Magnussen after not being medically cleared to drive.
- Team Penske announced that three-time Supercars champion Scott McLaughlin would race full-time for the team in IndyCar in 2021.
- Chip Ganassi Racing signed Álex Palou to drive the No. 10 full-time in the 2021 season.
- After competing in three races in 2020 with both Team Penske and Arrow McLaren SP, Hélio Castroneves contested a six-race schedule in 2021 with Meyer Shank Racing.
- Chip Ganassi Racing re-signed Tony Kanaan to a two-year contract to contest the oval events, in complement to Jimmie Johnson's road & street course schedule in the No. 48 entry. Kanaan previously drove for the team between 2014 and 2017.
- Colton Herta switched from the No. 88 Harding Steinbrenner-backed car to the No. 26, sponsored by Gainbridge.
- Arrow McLaren SP announced that two-time Indianapolis 500 winner Juan Pablo Montoya drove their third entry in the Indianapolis 500. This was Montoya's first Indianapolis 500 appearance since 2017. Montoya also drove the IndyGP.
- Paretta Autosport, a new team run by former Dodge/SRT Motorsports director Beth Paretta, announced that Simona de Silvestro drove a Team Penske-engineered Chevrolet in the Indianapolis 500. This was de Silvestro's first IndyCar and Indianapolis 500 appearance since 2015.
- James Hinchcliffe re-joined Andretti Autosport full-time in the No. 29 after competing in 6 races for the team in the 2020 season.
- Dale Coyne Racing with Vasser-Sullivan signed Ed Jones for the 2021 season. This was Jones' second stint with Dale Coyne Racing, having driven for them in the 2017 season.
- Dale Coyne Racing with Rick Ware Racing announced that Romain Grosjean would be racing for the team, driving the No. 51 entry on road and street circuits, after 10 seasons in Formula One. Pietro Fittipaldi drove the No. 51 on the ovals. Fittipaldi returned to the IndyCar Series for the first time since 2018. The team later announced that Cody Ware would make his IndyCar debut at Road America driving the No. 52 for Dale Coyne Racing with Rick Ware Racing. Ryan Norman piloted the No. 52 at Mid-Ohio.
- Santino Ferrucci drove for Rahal Letterman Lanigan Racing in the Indianapolis 500. Ferrucci previously drove for Dale Coyne Racing from 2018 to 2020. Ferrucci was later signed for two additional races for the Detroit doubleheader. Ferrucci made further appearances at Mid-Ohio and Nashville.
- J. R. Hildebrand signed to drive for A. J. Foyt Enterprises for the Indianapolis 500 running a tribute livery for the 60th anniversary of A. J. Foyt's first win in the race.
- Stefan Wilson signed to drive for Andretti Autosport for the Indianapolis 500. It was Wilson's first IndyCar start since the 2018 Indianapolis 500.
- Oliver Askew joined Ed Carpenter Racing at Road America as a substitute after Rinus VeeKay suffered injuries in a cycling accident. Askew drove the No. 45 Rahal Letterman Lanigan Racing entry for the final three races of the 2021 season.
- Formula 2 and Alpine Academy driver Christian Lundgaard made his IndyCar Series debut at the Big Machine Spiked Coolers Grand Prix at Indianapolis Motor Speedway, driving the No. 45 Rahal Letterman Lanigan Racing entry.
- Alfa Romeo reserve driver and Scuderia Ferrari test driver Callum Ilott contested the final three races of the season, driving the No. 77 entry for Juncos Hollinger Racing.

=== Team changes ===
- On October 28, 2020, it was announced that DragonSpeed, who competed on a part-time basis in the previous 2 seasons, left the IndyCar Series.
- Team Penske ended their partnership with Supercars team Dick Johnson Racing (with whom McLaughlin won his three titles) to make room for another IndyCar entry and thus returned to competing with four cars for the first time since 2017.
- Meyer Shank Racing added a second, part time entry for Hélio Castroneves after purchasing the car put up for sale by DragonSpeed.
- Chip Ganassi Racing also returned to a regular four-car team for the first time since 2017.
- Dale Coyne Racing announced a partnership with Rick Ware Racing (who field full- and part-time entries in numerous other series including the NASCAR Cup and Asian Le Mans Series) for the full season, changing the number of the team's second entry from No. 19 to No. 51.
- On February 18, 2021, Andretti Autosport mentioned that James Hinchcliffe's No. 29 entry would compete under the banner of "Andretti Steinbrenner Autosport", with one of the partners from the former Andretti Harding Steinbrenner Autosport entry, George Steinbrenner IV, returning as a partner.
- New entrant Top Gun Racing attempted to qualify for the Indianapolis 500 with R. C. Enerson after shelving their plans to run the 2020 Indianapolis 500. The team later ran at the Big Machine Spiked Cooler Grand Prix.
- On August 3, 2021, the newly renamed Juncos Hollinger Racing announced that it would return to top-level IndyCar competition for the first time since the 2019 Indianapolis 500, contesting the final three races of 2021 in preparation for a full-time campaign beginning in 2022. The announcement also mentioned that former Williams F1 shareholder Brad Hollinger had become a co-owner of the team.

== Schedule ==
On October 1, 2020, a seventeen-race calendar was announced. Iowa Speedway did not return from the 2020 IndyCar Series calendar, while all tracks that were unable to host races in 2020 due to the COVID-19 pandemic returned to the calendar with the exception of Circuit of the Americas and Richmond Raceway. A second road course race at Indianapolis was held once again, as part of a doubleheader on Brickyard weekend in August.

On December 17, 2020, it was announced that in order to provide "the best opportunity to provide our guests with a fun and exciting experience in a safe and unrestricted environment", the Acura Grand Prix of Long Beach would be rescheduled from April 18 to September 26, becoming the season finale. Combined with the Portland and Laguna Seca events, this formed a three-race west coast swing to conclude the season, while for the second consecutive year the season would conclude with a street course race.

On January 6, 2021, the Firestone Grand Prix of St. Petersburg was rescheduled to April 25 because of the COVID-19 pandemic, with the season opener being moved to Barber Motorsports Park.

On January 22, 2021, the Honda Indy Grand Prix of Alabama was rescheduled to April 18 because of the COVID-19 pandemic and was now on NBC network television.

On May 14, 2021, the Honda Indy Toronto was cancelled for a second successive season, due to the restrictions imposed in Ontario because of the COVID-19 pandemic.

Icon	Legend
O	Oval/Speedway
R	Road course
S	Street circuit
C	Cancelled race

Rd.	Date	Race name	Track	Location
1	April 18	Honda Indy Grand Prix of Alabama presented by AmFirst	R Barber Motorsports Park	Birmingham, Alabama
2	April 25	Firestone Grand Prix of St. Petersburg	S Streets of St. Petersburg	St. Petersburg, Florida
3	May 1	Genesys 300	O Texas Motor Speedway	Fort Worth, Texas
4	May 2	XPEL 375	O Texas Motor Speedway	Fort Worth, Texas
5	May 15	GMR Grand Prix	R Indianapolis Motor Speedway Road Course	Speedway, Indiana
6	May 30	105th Running of the Indianapolis 500	O Indianapolis Motor Speedway	Speedway, Indiana
7	June 12	Chevrolet Detroit Grand Prix	S Belle Isle Street Circuit	Detroit, Michigan
8	June 13	Chevrolet Detroit Grand Prix	S Belle Isle Street Circuit	Detroit, Michigan
9	June 20	REV Group Grand Prix at Road America	R Road America	Elkhart Lake, Wisconsin
10	July 4	Honda Indy 200 at Mid-Ohio	R Mid-Ohio Sports Car Course	Lexington, Ohio
C	July 11	Honda Indy Toronto	S Exhibition Place	Toronto, Ontario
11	August 8	Big Machine Music City Grand Prix	S Nashville Street Circuit	Nashville, Tennessee
12	August 14	Big Machine Spiked Coolers Grand Prix	R Indianapolis Motor Speedway Road Course	Speedway, Indiana
13	August 21	Bommarito Automotive Group 500	O World Wide Technology Raceway	Madison, Illinois
14	September 12	Grand Prix of Portland	R Portland International Raceway	Portland, Oregon
15	September 19	Firestone Grand Prix of Monterey	R WeatherTech Raceway Laguna Seca	Monterey, California
16	September 26	Acura Grand Prix of Long Beach	S Streets of Long Beach	Long Beach, California

== Results ==
Rd.	Race	Pole position	Fastest lap	Most laps led	Race Winner			Report
Rd.	Race	Pole position	Fastest lap	Most laps led	Driver	Team	Manufacturer	Report
1	Birmingham	(Mexico) Pato O'Ward	(Mexico) Pato O'Ward	(Spain) Álex Palou	(Spain) Álex Palou	Chip Ganassi Racing	Honda	Report
2	St. Petersburg	(United States) Colton Herta	(Spain) Álex Palou	(United States) Colton Herta	(United States) Colton Herta	Andretti Autosport	Honda	Report
3	Texas 1	(Spain) Álex Palou (Note: Qualifying for Texas was cancelled due to rain. The grid was set by entrant points entering the race, and no bonus point was awarded for pole position.)	(Sweden) Marcus Ericsson	(New Zealand) Scott Dixon	(New Zealand) Scott Dixon	Chip Ganassi Racing	Honda	Report
4	Texas 2	(New Zealand) Scott Dixon	(Spain) Álex Palou	(New Zealand) Scott Dixon	(Mexico) Pato O'Ward	Arrow McLaren SP	Chevrolet	Report
5	IMS GMR GP	(France) Romain Grosjean	(Netherlands) Rinus VeeKay	(France) Romain Grosjean	(Netherlands) Rinus VeeKay	Ed Carpenter Racing	Chevrolet	Report
6	Indianapolis 500	(New Zealand) Scott Dixon	(United States) Santino Ferrucci	(United States) Conor Daly	(Brazil) Hélio Castroneves	Meyer Shank Racing	Honda	Report
7	Detroit 1	(Mexico) Pato O'Ward	(United States) Josef Newgarden	(Australia) Will Power	(Sweden) Marcus Ericsson	Chip Ganassi Racing	Honda	Report
8	Detroit 2	(United States) Josef Newgarden	(United States) Colton Herta	(United States) Josef Newgarden	(Mexico) Pato O'Ward	Arrow McLaren SP	Chevrolet	Report
9	Road America	(United States) Josef Newgarden	(Spain) Álex Palou	(United States) Josef Newgarden	(Spain) Álex Palou	Chip Ganassi Racing	Honda	Report
10	Mid-Ohio	(United States) Josef Newgarden	(United Kingdom) Jack Harvey	(United States) Josef Newgarden	(United States) Josef Newgarden	Team Penske	Chevrolet	Report
11	Nashville	(United States) Colton Herta	(United States) Colton Herta	(United States) Colton Herta	(Sweden) Marcus Ericsson	Chip Ganassi Racing	Honda	Report
12	IMS Big Machine GP	(Mexico) Pato O'Ward	(Australia) Will Power	(Australia) Will Power	(Australia) Will Power	Team Penske	Chevrolet	Report
13	Gateway	(Australia) Will Power	(Japan) Takuma Sato	(United States) Josef Newgarden	(United States) Josef Newgarden	Team Penske	Chevrolet	Report
14	Portland	(Spain) Álex Palou	(France) Romain Grosjean	(United States) Graham Rahal	(Spain) Álex Palou	Chip Ganassi Racing	Honda	Report
15	Laguna Seca	(United States) Colton Herta	(United States) Josef Newgarden	(United States) Colton Herta	(United States) Colton Herta	Andretti Autosport w/ Curb-Agajanian	Honda	Report
16	Long Beach	(United States) Josef Newgarden	(Mexico) Pato O'Ward	(United States) Colton Herta	(United States) Colton Herta	Andretti Autosport w/ Curb-Agajanian	Honda	Report

== Points standings ==
- Ties are broken by number of wins, followed by number of 2nds, 3rds, etc.; then by finishing position in the previous race; then by random draw.

=== Driver standings ===
- At all races except the Indy 500, the pole position qualifier earned 1 point (unless qualifying is not held). The top nine Indy 500 qualifiers received points, descending from 9 points for the pole position. At double header races, the fastest qualifier of each qualifying group earned 1 point.
- Drivers who lead at least one race lap were awarded 1 point. The driver who leads the most laps during a race scored an additional 2 points.
- Entrant-initiated engine change-outs before the engine reached their required distance run resulted in the loss of 10 points.

Pos	Driver	BAR	STP	TMS		IGP1	INDY	BEL		ROA	MOH	NSC	IGP2	GTW	POR	LAG	LBH	Pts
1	(Spain) Álex Palou	1^{L}*	17^{L}	**4**^{cL}	7^{L}	3^{L}	2^{6L}	15	3	1^{L}	3	7	27	20	**1**^{L}	2	4	549
2	(United States) Josef Newgarden	23	2	6	2^{L}	4	12	10	**2**^{L}*	**21**^{L}*	**1**^{L}*	10	8^{L}	1^{L}*	5	7	**2**^{L}	511
3	(Mexico) Pato O'Ward	**4**^{L}	19	3	1^{L}	15	4^{L}	**3**^{L}	1^{L}	9	8	13	**5**^{L}	2^{L}	14^{L}	5	27	487
4	(New Zealand) Scott Dixon	3	5	1^{L}*	**4**^{cL}*	9^{L}	**17**^{1L}	8^{L}	7	4^{L}	4	2	17	19	3^{L}	13	3^{L}	481
5	(United States) Colton Herta	22	**1**^{L}*	22	5	13	16^{2L}	14	4	2	13^{L}	**19**^{L}*	3^{L}	18^{L}	8	**1**^{L}*	1^{L}*	455
6	(Sweden) Marcus Ericsson	8	7	19	12	10	11^{9}	1^{L}	9	6	2^{L}	1^{L}	9	9	7^{L}	6	28	435
7	(United States) Graham Rahal	7	15	5	3^{L}	5	32^{L}	5^{L}	5	11	6	5	7	23	10^{L}*	4	16^{L}	389
8	(France) Simon Pagenaud	12	3^{L}	10	6	6	3^{L}	12	8	18	14	21	16^{L}	8^{L}	21	8	5	383
9	(Australia) Will Power	2^{L}	8	14	13^{L}	11	30	20^{L}*	6	3	25	14	1^{L}*	**3**^{L}	13	26	10	357
10	(United States) Alexander Rossi	9	21	8	20	7	29	7^{L}	13	7	5	17	4	17	2	25	6	332
11	(Japan) Takuma Sato	13	6	9	14^{L}	16	14^{L}	4	12	8^{L}	10	25	10	6	12	27	9	324
12	(Netherlands) Rinus VeeKay	6^{L}	9	20	9^{L}	1^{L}	8^{3L}	2	18		16	24	24	21	17	18	25	308
13	(United Kingdom) Jack Harvey	11	4	7	17	23	18	16	19	17	19	15	6	10	4^{L}	15	7^{L}	308
14	(New Zealand) Scott McLaughlin RY	14	11	2	8	8	20	19	20	14	12	22	23	4	9^{L}	12	11	305
15	(France) Romain Grosjean R	10	13			**2**^{L}*		23^{L}	24	5	7	16^{L}	2	14	22	3^{L}	24	272
16	(France) Sébastien Bourdais	5^{L}	10	24	19	19	26	11	16	16	11	27	15	5^{L}	18	14	8	258
17	(United States) Ryan Hunter-Reay	24	14	16	10	12^{L}	22^{7}	21	11	13	24	4	18	7	15	11	23	256
18	(United States) Conor Daly	16	16	21	24	25	13^{L}*	13	15	20	15	12	11	11	16	16	21	235
19	(United Arab Emirates) Ed Jones	15	20	12	22	14	28	9^{L}	17	23	26	6	14	24	11^{L}	10	12	233
20	(Canada) James Hinchcliffe	17	18	23	18	18	21	17	14	15	17	3	22	15	27	20	14	220
21	(Sweden) Felix Rosenqvist	21	12	13	16	17	27^{L}	25			23	8	13	16	6	19	13	205
22	(Brazil) Hélio Castroneves						1^{8L}					9	21		23	24	20^{L}	158
23	(Canada) Dalton Kellett	18	23	18	23	20	23	18	23	25	21	23	26	12	26	23	19	148
24	(United States) Santino Ferrucci						6^{L}	6	10		9	11						146
25	(United Kingdom) Max Chilton	20	24				24	22	22	10^{L}	18	18	20		19	21	15	134
26	(United States) Jimmie Johnson R	19	22			24		24	21	22	22	26	19		20	17	17	108
27	(United States) Ed Carpenter			17	11^{L}		5^{4}							22				107
28	(Brazil) Tony Kanaan			11	15		10^{5}							13				96
29	(United States) Oliver Askew								25	12^{L}					24	9	22^{L}	61
30	(United States) Sage Karam						7^{L}											53
31	(Colombia) Juan Pablo Montoya					21	9											53
32	(Brazil) Pietro Fittipaldi			15	21		25											34
33	(United States) J. R. Hildebrand						15											30
34	(United States) Cody Ware R									19		20	25					26
35	(United States) Marco Andretti						19											22
36	(United States) Charlie Kimball					22	DNQ										18	20
37	(Denmark) Christian Lundgaard R												12^{L}					19
38	(United Kingdom) Callum Ilott R														25	22	26	18
39	(United States) Ryan Norman R										20							10
40	(Switzerland) Simona de Silvestro						31											10
41	(United Kingdom) Stefan Wilson R						33											10
42	(Denmark) Kevin Magnussen R									24^{L}								7
43	(United States) R. C. Enerson R						DNQ						28					5
Pos	Driver	BAR	STP	TMS		IGP1	INDY	BEL		ROA	MOH	NSC	IGP2	GTW	POR	LAG	LBH	Pts

Color	Result
Gold	Winner
Silver	2nd-place finish
Bronze	3rd-place finish
Green	Top 5 finish
Light Blue	Top 10 finish
Dark Blue	Other flagged position
Purple	Did not finish
Red	Did not qualify (DNQ)
Brown	Withdrew (Wth)
Black	Disqualified (DSQ)
White	Did Not Start (DNS)
White	Race abandoned (C)
Blank	Did not participate

**In-line notation**
**Bold**	Pole position (1 point; except Indy)
Italics	Ran fastest race lap
^{L}	Led race lap (1 point)
*	Led most race laps (2 points)
^{1–9}	Indy 500 "Fast Nine" bonus points
^{c}	Qualifying canceled (no bonus point)
RY	Rookie of the Year
R	Rookie

=== Entrant standings ===
- Based on the entrant, used for oval qualifications order, and starting grids when qualifying is cancelled.
- Only full-time entrants, and at-large part-time entrants shown.

Pos	Entrant	BAR	STP	TMS		IGP1	INDY	BEL		ROA	MOH	NSC	IGP2	GTW	POR	LAG	LBH	Pts
1	#10 Chip Ganassi Racing	1^{L}*	17^{L}	**4**^{cL}	7^{L}	3^{L}	2^{6L}	15	3	1^{L}	3	7	27	20	**1**^{L}	2	4	549
2	#2 Team Penske	23	2	6	2^{L}	4	12	10	**2**^{L}*	**21**^{L}*	**1**^{L}*	10	8^{L}	1^{L}*	5	7	**2**^{L}	511
3	#5 Arrow McLaren SP	**4**^{L}	19	3	1^{L}	15	4^{L}	**3**^{L}	1^{L}	9	8	13	**5**^{L}	2^{L}	14^{L}	5	27	487
4	#9 Chip Ganassi Racing	3	5	1^{L}*	**4**^{cL}*	9^{L}	**17**^{1L}	8^{L}	7	4^{L}	4	2	17	19	3^{L}	13	3^{L}	481
5	#26 Andretti Autosport	22	**1**^{L}*	22	5	13	16^{2L}	14	4	2	13^{L}	**19**^{L}*	3^{L}	18^{L}	8	**1**^{L}*	1^{L}*	455
6	#8 Chip Ganassi Racing	8	7	19	12	10	11^{9}	1^{L}	9	6	2^{L}	1^{L}	9	9	7^{L}	6	28	435
7	#15 Rahal Letterman Lanigan Racing	7	15	5	3^{L}	5	32^{L}	5^{L}	5	11	6	5	7	23	10^{L}*	4	16^{L}	389
8	#22 Team Penske	12	3^{L}	10	6	6	3^{L}	12	8	18	14	21	16^{L}	8^{L}	21	8	5	383
9	#12 Team Penske	2^{L}	8	14	13^{L}	11	30	20^{L}*	6	3	25	14	1^{L}*	**3**^{L}	13	26	10	357
10	#27 Andretti Autosport	9	21	8	20	7	29	7^{L}	13	7	5	17	4	17	2	25	6	332
11	#21 Ed Carpenter Racing	6^{L}	9	20	9^{L}	1^{L}	8^{3L}	2	18	12^{L}	16	24	24	21	17	18	25	327
12	#30 Rahal Letterman Lanigan Racing	13	6	9	14^{L}	16	14^{L}	4	12	8^{L}	10	25	10	6	12	27	9	324
13	#60 Meyer Shank Racing	11	4	7	17	23	18	16	19	17	19	15	6	10	4^{L}	15	7^{L}	308
14	#51 Dale Coyne Racing with Rick Ware Racing	10	13	15	21	**2**^{L}*	25	23^{L}	24	5	7	16^{L}	2	14	22	3^{L}	24	306
15	#3 Team Penske	14	11	2	8	8	20	19	20	14	12	22	23	4	9^{L}	12	11	305
16	#20 Ed Carpenter Racing	16	16	17	11^{L}	25	5^{4}	13	15	20	15	12	11	22	16	16	21	271
17	#14 A. J. Foyt Enterprises	5^{L}	10	24	19	19	26	11	16	16	11	27	15	5^{L}	18	14	8	258
18	#28 Andretti Autosport	24	14	16	10	12^{L}	22^{7}	21	11	13	24	4	18	7	15	11	23	256
19	#18 Dale Coyne Racing with Vasser-Sullivan	15	20	12	22	14	28	9^{L}	17	23	26	6	14	24	11^{L}	10	12	233
20	#29 Andretti Steinbrenner Autosport	17	18	23	18	18	21	17	14	15	17	3	22	15	27	20	14	220
21	#7 Arrow McLaren SP	21	12	13	16	17	27^{L}	25	25	24^{L}	23	8	13	16	6	19	13	217
22	#48 Chip Ganassi Racing	19	22	11	15	24	10^{5}	24	21	22	22	26	19	13	20	17	17	204
23	#45 Rahal Letterman Lanigan Racing						6^{L}	6	10		9	11	12^{L}		24	9	22^{L}	202
24	#59 Carlin	20	24	21	24	Wth	24	22	22	10^{L}	18	18	20	11	19	21	15	168
25	#06 Meyer Shank Racing						1^{8L}					9	21		23	24	20^{L}	158
26	#4 A. J. Foyt Enterprises	18	23	18	23	20	23	18	23	25	21	23	26	12	26	23	19	148
Pos	Entrant	BAR	STP	TMS		IGP1	INDY	BEL		ROA	MOH	NSC	IGP2	GTW	POR	LAG	LBH	Pts

=== Manufacturer standings ===
- All manufacturer points (including qualifying points, race finish points, and race win bonus points) could only be earned by full-season entrants, and provided they were using an engine from their initial allocation, or had mileaged out all previously used engines. Ineligible cars were removed from the finishing order used for race finish points, and could not score pole or win bonus points.
- The top two finishing entrants from each manufacturer in each race scored points for their respective manufacturer. The manufacturer that won each race was awarded five additional points.
- At all races except the Indy 500, the manufacturer who qualified on pole earned one point. At the Indy 500, the fastest Saturday qualifier earned one point, while the pole position winner on Sunday earned two points.

Pos	Manufacturer	BAR	STP	TMS		IGP	INDY	BEL		ROA	MOH	NSC	IGP2	GTW	POR	LAG	LBH	Bonus	Pts
1	Honda	1	1	1	3	2	1	1	3	1	2	1	2	5	1	1	1	78	1401
1	Honda	3	4	4	4	3	6	4	4	2	3	2	3	6	2	2	2	78	1401
1	Honda	90^{W}	88^{PW}	87^{W}	67	76^{P}	159^{PP}	87^{W}	67	95^{W}	75	96^{PW}	75	58	90	96^{PW}	95^{W}	78	1401
2	Chevrolet	2	2	2	1	1	2	2	1	3	1	7	1	1	4	4	3	40	1238
2	Chevrolet	4	3	3	2	4	3	3	2	9	8	8	5	2	7	6	6	40	1238
2	Chevrolet	73^{P}	75	75	95^{W}	87^{W}	115	76^{P}	96^{PW}	58^{P}	80^{PW}	50	86^{PW}	91^{P}	58	60	63	40	1238

Manufacturer standings results breakdown
Entrant	BAR	STP	TMS		IGP1	INDY	BEL		ROA	MOH	NSC	IGP2	GTW	POR	LAG	LBH
Chevrolet
#2 Team Penske	23	2	6	2	4^{2}	8^{3}	9	**2**	**20**	**1**^{4}	8	Ineligible				
#3 Team Penske	14	11	2	8	8^{2}	13	18	19^{3}	14	11	18	20^{4}	3	7	8	8
#4 A. J. Foyt Enterprises	18	23	18	23	20^{2}	16^{3}	17	22	24	19	19	22	11^{4}	18	17	15
#5 Arrow McLaren SP	**4**	19	3	1	15^{2}	3^{3}	**3**	1	9	8	10^{4}	**5**	1	11	4	18
#7 Arrow McLaren SP	21	12	13	16	17^{2}	20^{3}	24	24	23	21	7	11	15^{4}	4	14	10
#12 Team Penske	2	8	14	13	11^{2}	23^{3}	19	6	3	23	11	1^{4}	**2**	10	19	7
#14 A. J. Foyt Enterprises	5	10	24	19	19^{2}	19^{3,4}	10	15	16	10	23	13	4	13	10	6
#20 Ed Carpenter Racing	16	16	17	11	23^{2}	4^{3}	12	14	19	14	9^{4}	10	20	12	12	16
#21 Ed Carpenter Racing	6	9	20	9	1^{2}	5^{3}	2	17	12	15	20^{4}	21	19	Ineligible		
#22 Team Penske	12	3	10	6	6^{2}	2^{3}	11	8	18	13	17^{4}	14	7	16	6	3
#59 Carlin	20	24	21	24	Wth^{2}	17^{3}	21	21	10	17	15	18^{4}	10	14	16	12
Honda
#8 Chip Ganassi Racing	8	7	19	12	10^{2}	7	1	9	6^{3}	2	1	8	8	5^{4}	5	19
#9 Chip Ganassi Racing	3	5	1	4	9	**11**^{2}	7	7^{3}	4	4	2	15	18	2^{4}	9	2
#10 Chip Ganassi Racing	1	17	4^{2}	7	3	1^{3}	14	3^{4}	1	3	Ineligible					
#15 Rahal Letterman Lanigan Racing	7	15	5	3	5^{2}	24	5	5^{3}	11	6	5	7	21	8^{4}	3	13
#18 Dale Coyne Racing with Vasser-Sullivan	15	20	12	22	14	21^{2}	8	16^{3}	22	24	6	12	22	9^{4}	7	9
#26 Andretti Autosport	22	**1**	22	5	13	10^{2}	13	4^{3}	2	12	16	**3**	17	6^{4}	**1**	1
#27 Andretti Autosport	9	21	8	20	7	22^{2}	6	12^{3}	7	5	14	4	16	1^{4}	18	4
#28 Andretti Autosport	24	14	16	10	12	15^{2}	20	10^{3}	13	22	4	16	6	Ineligible		
#29 Andretti Steinbrenner Autosport	17	18	23	18	18	14^{2}	16	13^{3}	15	16	3	19	14	19^{4}	15	11
#30 Rahal Letterman Lanigan Racing	13	6	9	14	16	9^{2}	4	11^{3}	8	9	21	9	5	Ineligible		
#48 Chip Ganassi Racing	19	22	11	15	22^{2}	6	23	20^{3}	21	20	22^{4}	17	12	15	13	14
#51 Dale Coyne Racing with Rick Ware Racing	10	13	15	21	**2**^{2}	18	22	23^{3}	5	7	13	2	13	17^{4}	2	17
#60 Meyer Shank Racing	11	4	7	17	21	12^{2,3}	15	18^{4}	17	18	12	6	9	3	11	5
Superscript indicates entrant engine count

== See also ==
- 2021 Indy Lights
- 2021 Indy Pro 2000 Championship
- 2021 U.S. F2000 National Championship
