= 2021 Go Bowling at The Glen =

NASCAR Cup Series race

Race details
- Race 23 of 36 in the 2021 NASCAR Cup Series
- Date: August 8, 2021
- Location: Watkins Glen International in Watkins Glen, New York
- Course: Permanent racing facility
- Course length: 2.45 miles (3.94 km)
- Distance: 90 laps, 220.5 mi (354.6 km)
- Average speed: 101.031 miles per hour (162.594 km/h)

Pole position
Driver	Brad Keselowski	Team Penske
- Grid positions set by competition-based formula

Most laps led
Driver	Martin Truex Jr.	Joe Gibbs Racing
- Laps: 34

Winner
No. 5	Kyle Larson	Hendrick Motorsports

Television in the United States
- Network: NBCSN
- Announcers: Rick Allen, Steve Letarte (booth), Mike Bagley (Esses), Dale Earnhardt Jr. (Turn 5) and Jeff Burton (Turns 6–7)

Radio in the United States
- Radio: MRN
- Booth announcers: Alex Hayden and Jeff Striegle
- Turn announcers: Dave Moody (Esses), Kurt Becker (Turn 5) and Kyle Rickey (Turns 10–11)

The 2021 Go Bowling at The Glen was a NASCAR Cup Series race held on August 8, 2021, at Watkins Glen International in Watkins Glen, New York. Contested over 90 laps on the 2.45-mile (3.94 km) road course, it was the 23rd race of the 2021 NASCAR Cup Series season.

== Report ==
=== Background ===
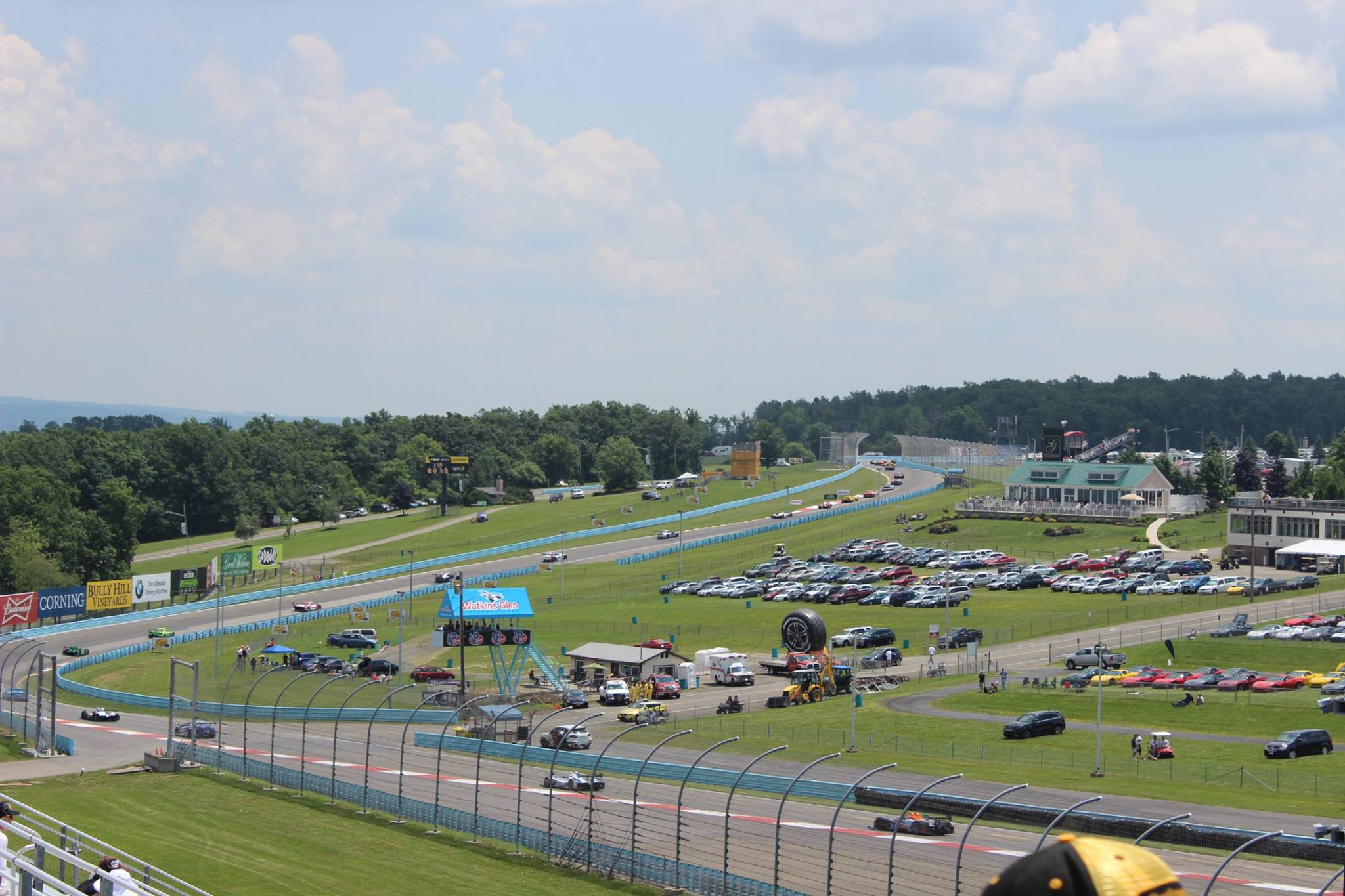
Watkins Glen International

The 2021 Go Bowling at The Glen program cover.

Watkins Glen International (nicknamed "The Glen") is an automobile race track located in Watkins Glen, New York at the southern tip of Seneca Lake. It was long known around the world as the home of the Formula One United States Grand Prix, which it hosted for twenty consecutive years (1961–1980), but the site has been home to road racing of nearly every class, including the World Sportscar Championship, Trans-Am, Can-Am, NASCAR Cup Series, the International Motor Sports Association and the IndyCar Series.

Initially, public roads in the village were used for the race course. In 1956 a permanent circuit for the race was built. In 1968 the race was extended to six hours, becoming the 6 Hours of Watkins Glen. The circuit's current layout has more or less been the same since 1971, although a chicane was installed at the uphill Esses in 1975 to slow cars through these corners, where there was a fatality during practice at the 1973 United States Grand Prix. The chicane was removed in 1985, but another chicane called the "Inner Loop" was installed in 1992 after J.D. McDuffie's fatal accident during the previous year's NASCAR Winston Cup event.

The circuit is known as the Mecca of North American road racing and is a very popular venue among fans and drivers. The facility is currently owned by International Speedway Corporation.

==== Entry list ====
- (R) denotes rookie driver.
- (i) denotes driver who are ineligible for series driver points.

No.	Driver	Team	Manufacturer
00	Quin Houff	StarCom Racing	Chevrolet
1	Kurt Busch	Chip Ganassi Racing	Chevrolet
2	Brad Keselowski	Team Penske	Ford
3	Austin Dillon	Richard Childress Racing	Chevrolet
4	Kevin Harvick	Stewart-Haas Racing	Ford
5	Kyle Larson	Hendrick Motorsports	Chevrolet
6	Ryan Newman	Roush Fenway Racing	Ford
7	Corey LaJoie	Spire Motorsports	Chevrolet
8	Tyler Reddick	Richard Childress Racing	Chevrolet
9	Chase Elliott	Hendrick Motorsports	Chevrolet
10	Aric Almirola	Stewart-Haas Racing	Ford
11	Denny Hamlin	Joe Gibbs Racing	Toyota
12	Ryan Blaney	Team Penske	Ford
14	Chase Briscoe (R)	Stewart-Haas Racing	Ford
15	R. C. Enerson	Rick Ware Racing	Chevrolet
17	Chris Buescher	Roush Fenway Racing	Ford
18	Kyle Busch	Joe Gibbs Racing	Toyota
19	Martin Truex Jr.	Joe Gibbs Racing	Toyota
20	Christopher Bell	Joe Gibbs Racing	Toyota
21	Matt DiBenedetto	Wood Brothers Racing	Ford
22	Joey Logano	Team Penske	Ford
23	Bubba Wallace	23XI Racing	Toyota
24	William Byron	Hendrick Motorsports	Chevrolet
34	Michael McDowell	Front Row Motorsports	Ford
37	Ryan Preece	JTG Daugherty Racing	Chevrolet
38	Anthony Alfredo (R)	Front Row Motorsports	Ford
41	Cole Custer	Stewart-Haas Racing	Ford
42	Ross Chastain	Chip Ganassi Racing	Chevrolet
43	Erik Jones	Richard Petty Motorsports	Chevrolet
47	Ricky Stenhouse Jr.	JTG Daugherty Racing	Chevrolet
48	Alex Bowman	Hendrick Motorsports	Chevrolet
51	James Davison	Petty Ware Racing	Ford
52	Josh Bilicki	Rick Ware Racing	Ford
53	Garrett Smithley (i)	Rick Ware Racing	Ford
77	Justin Haley (i)	Spire Motorsports	Chevrolet
78	Kyle Tilley	Live Fast Motorsports	Ford
99	Daniel Suárez	Trackhouse Racing Team	Chevrolet
Official entry list

== Qualifying ==
Brad Keselowski was awarded the pole for the race as determined by competition-based formula.

=== Starting Lineup ===
Pos	No.	Driver	Team	Manufacturer
1	2	Brad Keselowski	Team Penske	Ford
2	22	Joey Logano	Team Penske	Ford
3	12	Ryan Blaney	Team Penske	Ford
4	5	Kyle Larson	Hendrick Motorsports	Chevrolet
5	4	Kevin Harvick	Stewart-Haas Racing	Ford
6	11	Denny Hamlin	Joe Gibbs Racing	Toyota
7	20	Christopher Bell	Joe Gibbs Racing	Toyota
8	10	Aric Almirola	Stewart-Haas Racing	Ford
9	19	Martin Truex Jr.	Joe Gibbs Racing	Toyota
10	48	Alex Bowman	Hendrick Motorsports	Chevrolet
11	9	Chase Elliott	Hendrick Motorsports	Chevrolet
12	42	Ross Chastain	Chip Ganassi Racing	Chevrolet
13	8	Tyler Reddick	Richard Childress Racing	Chevrolet
14	21	Matt DiBenedetto	Wood Brothers Racing	Ford
15	24	William Byron	Hendrick Motorsports	Chevrolet
16	3	Austin Dillon	Richard Childress Racing	Chevrolet
17	1	Kurt Busch	Chip Ganassi Racing	Chevrolet
18	47	Ricky Stenhouse Jr.	JTG Daugherty Racing	Chevrolet
19	41	Cole Custer	Stewart-Haas Racing	Ford
20	18	Kyle Busch	Joe Gibbs Racing	Toyota
21	99	Daniel Suárez	Trackhouse Racing Team	Chevrolet
22	43	Erik Jones	Richard Petty Motorsports	Chevrolet
23	37	Ryan Preece	JTG Daugherty Racing	Chevrolet
24	17	Chris Buescher	Roush Fenway Racing	Ford
25	34	Michael McDowell	Front Row Motorsports	Ford
26	23	Bubba Wallace	23XI Racing	Toyota
27	14	Chase Briscoe (R)	Stewart-Haas Racing	Ford
28	6	Ryan Newman	Roush Fenway Racing	Ford
29	7	Corey LaJoie	Spire Motorsports	Chevrolet
30	77	Justin Haley (i)	Spire Motorsports	Chevrolet
31	38	Anthony Alfredo (R)	Front Row Motorsports	Ford
32	53	Garrett Smithley (i)	Rick Ware Racing	Chevrolet
33	78	Kyle Tilley	Live Fast Motorsports	Ford
34	52	Josh Bilicki	Rick Ware Racing	Ford
35	00	Quin Houff	StarCom Racing	Chevrolet
36	51	James Davison	Petty Ware Racing	Ford
37	15	R. C. Enerson	Rick Ware Racing	Chevrolet
Official starting lineup

== Race ==
=== Stage Results ===
Stage One Laps: 20

Pos	No	Driver	Team	Manufacturer	Points
1	22	Joey Logano	Team Penske	Ford	10
2	5	Kyle Larson	Hendrick Motorsports	Chevrolet	9
3	11	Denny Hamlin	Joe Gibbs Racing	Toyota	8
4	8	Tyler Reddick	Richard Childress Racing	Chevrolet	7
5	24	William Byron	Hendrick Motorsports	Chevrolet	6
6	18	Kyle Busch	Joe Gibbs Racing	Toyota	5
7	48	Alex Bowman	Hendrick Motorsports	Chevrolet	4
8	9	Chase Elliott	Hendrick Motorsports	Chevrolet	3
9	3	Austin Dillon	Richard Childress Racing	Chevrolet	2
10	43	Erik Jones	Richard Petty Motorsports	Chevrolet	1
Official stage one results

Stage Two Laps: 20

Pos	No	Driver	Team	Manufacturer	Points
1	19	Martin Truex Jr.	Joe Gibbs Racing	Toyota	10
2	20	Christopher Bell	Joe Gibbs Racing	Toyota	9
3	4	Kevin Harvick	Stewart-Haas Racing	Ford	8
4	5	Kyle Larson	Hendrick Motorsports	Chevrolet	7
5	14	Chase Briscoe (R)	Stewart-Haas Racing	Ford	6
6	42	Ross Chastain	Chip Ganassi Racing	Chevrolet	5
7	21	Matt DiBenedetto	Wood Brothers Racing	Ford	4
8	11	Denny Hamlin	Joe Gibbs Racing	Toyota	3
9	22	Joey Logano	Team Penske	Ford	2
10	18	Kyle Busch	Joe Gibbs Racing	Toyota	1
Official stage two results

=== Final Stage Results ===
Stage Three Laps: 50

Larson's victory put him in a tie with Hamlin for the regular-season points lead.

Pos	Grid	No	Driver	Team	Manufacturer	Laps	Points
1	4	5	Kyle Larson	Hendrick Motorsports	Chevrolet	90	56
2	11	9	Chase Elliott	Hendrick Motorsports	Chevrolet	90	38
3	9	19	Martin Truex Jr.	Joe Gibbs Racing	Toyota	90	44
4	20	18	Kyle Busch	Joe Gibbs Racing	Toyota	90	39
5	6	11	Denny Hamlin	Joe Gibbs Racing	Toyota	90	43
6	15	24	William Byron	Hendrick Motorsports	Chevrolet	90	37
7	7	20	Christopher Bell	Joe Gibbs Racing	Toyota	90	39
8	5	4	Kevin Harvick	Stewart-Haas Racing	Ford	90	37
9	27	14	Chase Briscoe (R)	Stewart-Haas Racing	Ford	90	34
10	13	8	Tyler Reddick	Richard Childress Racing	Chevrolet	90	34
11	14	21	Matt DiBenedetto	Wood Brothers Racing	Ford	90	30
12	12	42	Ross Chastain	Chip Ganassi Racing	Chevrolet	90	30
13	17	1	Kurt Busch	Chip Ganassi Racing	Chevrolet	90	24
14	3	12	Ryan Blaney	Team Penske	Ford	90	23
15	16	3	Austin Dillon	Richard Childress Racing	Chevrolet	90	24
16	8	10	Aric Almirola	Stewart-Haas Racing	Ford	90	21
17	24	17	Chris Buescher	Roush Fenway Racing	Ford	90	20
18	19	41	Cole Custer	Stewart-Haas Racing	Ford	90	19
19	18	47	Ricky Stenhouse Jr.	JTG Daugherty Racing	Chevrolet	90	18
20	10	48	Alex Bowman	Hendrick Motorsports	Chevrolet	90	21
21	25	34	Michael McDowell	Front Row Motorsports	Ford	90	16
22	2	22	Joey Logano	Team Penske	Ford	90	27
23	26	23	Bubba Wallace	23XI Racing	Toyota	90	14
24	29	7	Corey LaJoie	Spire Motorsports	Chevrolet	90	13
25	28	6	Ryan Newman	Roush Fenway Racing	Ford	90	12
26	31	38	Anthony Alfredo (R)	Front Row Motorsports	Ford	89	11
27	22	43	Erik Jones	Richard Petty Motorsports	Chevrolet	89	11
28	23	37	Ryan Preece	JTG Daugherty Racing	Chevrolet	89	9
29	30	77	Justin Haley (i)	Spire Motorsports	Chevrolet	89	0
30	33	78	Kyle Tilley	Live Fast Motorsports	Ford	89	7
31	21	99	Daniel Suárez	Trackhouse Racing Team	Chevrolet	88	6
32	35	00	Quin Houff	StarCom Racing	Chevrolet	88	5
33	34	52	Josh Bilicki	Rick Ware Racing	Ford	88	4
34	37	15	R. C. Enerson	Rick Ware Racing	Chevrolet	88	3
35	1	2	Brad Keselowski	Team Penske	Ford	87	2
36	32	53	Garrett Smithley (i)	Rick Ware Racing	Chevrolet	87	0
37	36	51	James Davison	Petty Ware Racing	Ford	41	1
Official race results

=== Race statistics ===
- Lead changes: 7 among 7 different drivers
- Cautions/Laps: 4 for 6
- Red flags: 0
- Time of race: 2 hours, 10 minutes and 57 seconds
- Average speed: 101.031 miles per hour (162.594 km/h)

== Media ==
=== Television ===
NBC Sports covered the race on the television side as part of a Radio style Broadcast for the race. Rick Allen and Steve Letarte called the race from the broadcast booth. MRN broadcaster Mike Bagley called the race from the Esses, Dale Earnhardt Jr. had the call from Turn 5, and Jeff Burton had the call from a platform located off Turn 10 that covers Turns 6–7. Parker Kligerman and Dillon Welch handled the pit road duties from pit lane.

NBCSN
Booth announcers	Turn Announcers	Pit reporters
Lap-by-lap: Rick Allen; Color-commentator: Steve Letarte	Esses Announcer: Mike Bagley; Turn 5 Announcer: Dale Earnhardt Jr. Turn 6–7 Announcer: Jeff Burton	Parker Kligerman; Dillon Welch

=== Radio ===
Motor Racing Network had the radio call for the race, which was simulcast on Sirius XM NASCAR Radio. Alex Hayden and Jeff Striegle covered the action when the field raced down the front straightaway. Dave Moody called the race when the field raced thru the esses. Kurt Becker covered the action when the field raced thru the inner loop and turn 5 and Kyle Rickey covered the action in turn 10 & 11. Steve Post & Kim Coon called the action from the pits for MRN.

MRN
Booth announcers	Turn announcers	Pit reporters
Lead announcer: Alex Hayden; Announcer: Jeff Striegle	Esses: Dave Moody; Inner loop & Turn 5: Kurt Becker; Turn 10 & 11: Kyle Rickey	Steve Post; Kim Coon

== Standings after the race ==
Drivers' Championship standings

	Pos	Driver	Points
1	1	Kyle Larson	917
1	2	Denny Hamlin	917 (–0)
	3	William Byron	786 (–131)
	4	Kyle Busch	779 (–138)
	5	Joey Logano	760 (–157)
	6	Chase Elliott	749 (–168)
	7	Martin Truex Jr.	740 (–177)
	8	Ryan Blaney	712 (–205)
1	9	Kevin Harvick	710 (–207)
1	10	Brad Keselowski	678 (–239)
	11	Alex Bowman	633 (–284)
	12	Tyler Reddick	630 (–287)
	13	Austin Dillon	615 (–302)
	14	Kurt Busch	576 (–341)
	15	Christopher Bell	571 (–346)
	16	Chris Buescher	495 (–422)
Official driver's standings

Manufacturers' Championship standings

	Pos	Manufacturer	Points
	1	Chevrolet	852
1	2	Toyota	789 (–63)
1	3	Ford	787 (–65)

- Note: Only the first 16 positions are included for the driver standings.
- . – Driver has clinched a position in the NASCAR Cup Series playoffs.

Previous race: 2021 Foxwoods Resort Casino 301	NASCAR Cup Series; 2021 season	Next race: 2021 Verizon 200 at the Brickyard
