= 2016 Honda Indy 200 =

(United States) 2016 Mid-Ohio
Race details
12th round of the 2016 IndyCar Series season
← Previous race	Next race →
- Date: July 31, 2016
- Official name: Honda Indy 200
- Location: Mid-Ohio Sports Car Course
- Course: Permanent racing facility 2.258 mi / 3.634 km
- Distance: 90 laps 203.2 mi / 327.02 km

Pole position
- Driver: (France) Simon Pagenaud (Team Penske)
- Time: 1:03.8700

Fastest lap
- Driver: (Australia) Will Power (Team Penske)
- Time: 1:05.2600 (on lap 43 of 90)

Podium
- First: (France) Simon Pagenaud (Team Penske)
- Second: (Australia) Will Power (Team Penske)
- Third: (Colombia) Carlos Muñoz (Andretti Autosport)

The 2016 Honda Indy 200 was the 12th round of the 2016 IndyCar Series. The event took place July 29–31, 2016 and was held at the Mid-Ohio Sports Car Course in Lexington, Ohio. It was the 10th time the course had been used since returning to the IndyCar Series schedule in 2007.

Qualifying took place on July 30, 2016 with the threat of rain throughout the session. Despite dealing with lower back pain from the morning's practice session, Simon Pagenaud grabbed pole position for the event, setting a new track record with a time of 1:03.8700. It was Pagenaud's sixth pole position on the season. Pagenaud teammate and championship rival Will Power qualified second, while Josef Newgarden qualified third. Defending race winner Graham Rahal managed a sixth place qualifying run. Scott Dixon, who had been the fastest car until qualifying, missed out on the Fast Six qualifying session after not changing tires fast enough to be able to make another qualifying run in the second round. He started in 11th as a result.

The race was run with far better weather conditions than the previous day's sessions. At the start, Simon Pagenaud held his lead over Will Power with Josef Newgarden slotting into third. The field managed to get through the first corners without major incident, though a few drivers touched wheels. Early in the race, several teams began to attempt alternate strategies to improve their positions, including Mikhail Aleshin, Conor Daly, and Scott Dixon. Dixon's move would not matter, however, as on lap 16, he attempted to make a pass on Hélio Castroneves in turn three. The two touched, causing severe suspension damage to Dixon's car and relegating him to a last place finish. Castroneves continued on, but came in later after damage to his rear wing was too much to be able to keep the car on track. This resulted in the race's first caution period, during which many of those who had not yet made their first pit stops, including Pagenaud and Power, came in. Juan Pablo Montoya and Marco Andretti elected to stay out during this sequence, promoting them to first and second respectively.

Racing resumed on lap 19, where Josef Newgarden was able to get around Will Power on track. The next lap however, Power attempted to pass him back, but in the process clipped the rear bumper pod on Newgarden's car, forcing Newgarden to pit for a rear wing assembly change for the second consecutive race. Up front, Montoya continued to lead until lap 25, when he finally made his first pit stop. The lead was handed to one of the drivers on the alternate pit stop strategy, Mikhail Aleshin, who began to pull away from the field. Aleshin maintained his lead through the second pit stop sequence, but behind him, the Team Penske duo of Power and Pagenaud moved into second and third thanks to quick pit work from their teams. The gap to Aleshin, though, remained large.

On lap 61, the second caution of the race occurred when Jack Hawksworth went wide on entry to turn one, causing him to lose control and hit the wall. The caution allowed for the final round of pit stops of the race. During the stops, race leader Aleshin was released directly into the path of Josef Newgarden, causing the two to make contact and damaging both cars. The event ruined Aleshin's day, dropping him down the order to 17th. Will Power emerged from pit lane first, with Simon Pagenaud behind him. The race lead was handed to Conor Daly, who elected to stay out during the caution, but did not have enough fuel to the finish if another caution period did not occur.

Racing resumed on lap 66, where Daly immediately pulled out in front. Behind him, though, Pagenaud began to put heavy pressure on Power and in turn 12 was able to get by. This would prove to be the winning move of the race, as no caution period came, forcing Daly to pit on lap 84. One more incident did occur, though, on lap 87, when Sébastien Bourdais braked too late into turn 4, causing him to collide with Takuma Sato and send both of course. Sato was able to continue, while Bourdais' race ended with his car stuck in a gravel trap. Up front, Simon Pagenaud was able to pull away and win by 4.1620 seconds over his teammate Will Power. It was Pagenaud's fourth win of the season, but his first since prior to the Indianapolis 500. The victory also allowed Pagenaud to extend his lead in the points over his teammate. The podium was completed by Carlos Muñoz, who had a quiet but very strong day to finish as the top Honda in the field. Conor Daly's strong run at the end allowed him a sixth place finish, making him the highest placed rookie in the field. Mikhail Aleshin, the driver with the most laps led on the day, was not able to recover from his pit lane incident and finished a lowly 17th.

== Report ==
Key	Meaning
R	Rookie
W	Past winner

=== Qualifying ===
Pos	No.	Name	Grp.	Round 1	Round 2	Round 3
1	22	(France) Simon Pagenaud	1	1:04.2483	1:04.1428	1:03.8700
2	12	(Australia) Will Power	2	1:04.1430	1:04.0751	1:03.9381
3	21	(United States) Josef Newgarden	1	1:04.3739	1:04.3347	1:04.1200
4	28	(United States) Ryan Hunter-Reay	1	1:04.4418	1:04.3293	1:04.3265
5	83	(United States) Charlie Kimball W	1	1:04.5396	1:04.3879	1:04.3644
6	15	(United States) Graham Rahal W	2	1:04.3002	1:04.3071	1:04.4697
7	3	(Brazil) Hélio Castroneves W	1	1:04.5217	1:04.4300	
8	2	(Colombia) Juan Pablo Montoya W	1	1:04.6576	1:04.5141	
9	5	(Canada) James Hinchcliffe	2	1:04.3076	1:04.5796	
10	7	(Russia) Mikhail Aleshin	2	1:04.4446	1:04.6084	
11	9	(New Zealand) Scott Dixon W	2	1:04.1942	1:04.6554	
12	98	(United States) Alexander Rossi R	2	1:04.4868	1:04.8082	
13	8	(United Kingdom) Max Chilton R	1	1:04.7752		
14	10	(Brazil) Tony Kanaan	2	1:04.5885		
15	26	(Colombia) Carlos Muñoz	1	1:04.8621		
16	11	(France) Sébastien Bourdais	2	1:04.5967		
17	41	(United Kingdom) Jack Hawksworth	1	1:05.0196		
18	19	(United States) RC Enerson R	2	1:04.6576		
19	20	(United States) Spencer Pigot R	1	1:05.1891		
20	14	(Japan) Takuma Sato	2	1:04.8354		
21	27	(United States) Marco Andretti	1	1:05.1997		
22	18	(United States) Conor Daly R	2	1:05.1098		
OFFICIAL BOX SCORE

Source for individual rounds:

=== Race results ===
Pos	No.	Driver	Team	Engine	Laps	Time/Retired	Pit Stops	Grid	Laps Led	Pts.^{1}
1	22	(France) Simon Pagenaud	Team Penske	Chevrolet	90	1:49:59.6875	3	1	23	52
2	12	(Australia) Will Power	Team Penske	Chevrolet	90	+4.1620	3	2	3	41
3	26	(Colombia) Carlos Muñoz	Andretti Autosport	Honda	90	+6.5662	3	15		35
4	15	(United States) Graham Rahal W	Rahal Letterman Lanigan Racing	Honda	90	+7.0196	3	6		32
5	5	(Canada) James Hinchcliffe	Schmidt Peterson Motorsports	Honda	90	+11.1260	3	9		30
6	18	(United States) Conor Daly R	Dale Coyne Racing	Honda	90	+11.8526	4	22	22	29
7	20	(United States) Spencer Pigot R	Ed Carpenter Racing	Chevrolet	90	+12.8831	3	19		26
8	83	(United States) Charlie Kimball W	Chip Ganassi Racing	Chevrolet	90	+15.0016	3	5		24
9	14	(Japan) Takuma Sato	A. J. Foyt Enterprises	Honda	90	+18.0128	3	20		22
10	21	(United States) Josef Newgarden	Ed Carpenter Racing	Chevrolet	90	+18.5404	5	3		20
11	2	(Colombia) Juan Pablo Montoya W	Team Penske	Chevrolet	90	+20.6074	4	8	9	20
12	10	(Brazil) Tony Kanaan	Chip Ganassi Racing	Chevrolet	90	+23.9632	3	14		18
13	27	(United States) Marco Andretti	Andretti Autosport	Honda	90	+24.7606	3	21		17
14	98	(United States) Alexander Rossi R	Andretti Herta Autosport	Honda	90	+25.5191	3	12		16
15	3	(Brazil) Hélio Castroneves W	Team Penske	Chevrolet	90	+26.6191	5	7		15
16	8	(United Kingdom) Max Chilton R	Chip Ganassi Racing	Chevrolet	90	+26.8199	4	13		14
17	7	(Russia) Mikhail Aleshin	Schmidt Peterson Motorsports	Honda	90	+42.7274	6	10	33	16
18	28	(United States) Ryan Hunter-Reay	Andretti Autosport	Honda	90	+53.5383	3	4		12
19	19	(United States) RC Enerson R	Dale Coyne Racing	Honda	89	+1 Lap	3	18		11
20	11	(France) Sébastien Bourdais	KVSH Racing	Chevrolet	86	Off Course	3	16		10
21	41	(United Kingdom) Jack Hawksworth	A. J. Foyt Enterprises	Honda	60	Contact	2	17		9
22	9	(New Zealand) Scott Dixon W	Chip Ganassi Racing	Chevrolet	27	Mechanical	2	11		8
OFFICIAL BOX SCORE

Notes

^{1} Points include 1 point for leading at least 1 lap during a race, an additional 2 points for leading the most race laps, and 1 point for Pole Position.

Source for time gaps:

== Championship standings after the race ==
Drivers' Championship standings

	Pos	Driver	Points
	1	(France) Simon Pagenaud	484
	2	(Australia) Will Power	426
	3	(Brazil) Hélio Castroneves	373
1	4	(United States) Josef Newgarden	364
1	5	(New Zealand) Scott Dixon	357

- Note: Only the top five positions are included.

Previous race: 2016 Honda Indy Toronto	IndyCar Series; 2016 season	Next race: 2016 ABC Supply 500
Previous race: 2015 Honda Indy 200	Honda Indy 200	Next race: 2017 Honda Indy 200
