= 2021 Big Machine Music City Grand Prix =

11th round of the 2021 IndyCar Series

(United States) 2021 Big Machine Music City Grand Prix
Race details
11th round of the 2021 IndyCar season
← Previous race	Next race →
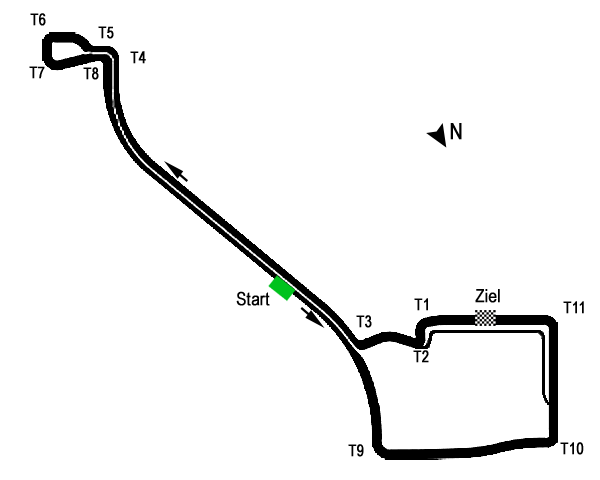
- Date: August 8, 2021
- Official name: Big Machine Music City Grand Prix
- Location: Nashville Street Circuit
- Course: Temporary street circuit 2.170 mi / 3.492 km
- Distance: 80 laps 173.600 mi / 279.360 km

Pole position
- Driver: (United States) (United States) Colton Herta (Andretti Autosport with Curb-Agajanian)
- Time: 01:13.6835

Fastest lap
- Driver: (United States) (United States) Colton Herta (Andretti Autosport with Curb-Agajanian)
- Time: 01:16.3064 (on lap 30 of 80)

Podium
- First: (Sweden) (Sweden) Marcus Ericsson (Chip Ganassi Racing)
- Second: (New Zealand) (New Zealand) Scott Dixon (Chip Ganassi Racing)
- Third: (Canada) (Canada) James Hinchcliffe (Andretti Steinbrenner Autosport)

The 2021 Big Machine Music City Grand Prix was an IndyCar motor race held on August 8, 2021 at the Nashville Street Circuit in Nashville, Tennessee. It was the eleventh round of the 2021 IndyCar Series and the ninth edition of the Music City Grand Prix (following changes made in 2024), the first on the street circuit.

The race lasted for 80 laps and was won by Marcus Ericsson of Chip Ganassi Racing, scoring his second win of the season.

== Background ==
In September 2020, IndyCar announced that the series will add a street race in downtown Nashville, Tennessee for the 2021 season.

The inaugural event was held on the weekend of August 6-8, 2021 at the newly created Nashville Street Circuit. It was the eleventh race of the 2021 season, marking the conclusion of the midseason summer break, which started following the Honda Indy 200 at Mid-Ohio. During the race weekend, the GT America series, the Trans-Am Series TA2 class, and the Stadium Super Trucks also competed as support series for the race.

This was the first of the two Big Machine-sponsored races in the 2021 season, the other being the following race, the Big Machine Spiked Coolers Grand Prix at the Indianapolis Motor Speedway.

=== Championship standings before the race ===
Chip Ganassi Racing's Álex Palou retained his lead in the driver's standings following his third-result at Mid-Ohio, over Pato O'Ward of Arrow McLaren SP and teammate Scott Dixon in second and third respectively. Mid-Ohio race winner Josef Newgarden of Team Penske remained fourth, while Ganassi driver Marcus Ericsson moved up to fifth, thanks to his second-place finish at the previous race.

Honda extended their lead over Chevrolet to 73 points after four Honda drivers finished in the top five at Mid-Ohio.

=== Entrants ===
Key	Meaning
R	Rookie
W	Past winner

No.	Driver	Team	Engine
2	(United States) Josef Newgarden	Team Penske	Chevrolet
3	(New Zealand) Scott McLaughlin R	Team Penske	Chevrolet
4	(Canada) Dalton Kellett	A. J. Foyt Enterprises	Chevrolet
5	(Mexico) Patricio O'Ward	Arrow McLaren SP	Chevrolet
06	(Brazil) Hélio Castroneves	Meyer Shank Racing	Honda
7	(Sweden) Felix Rosenqvist	Arrow McLaren SP	Chevrolet
8	(Sweden) Marcus Ericsson	Chip Ganassi Racing	Honda
9	(New Zealand) Scott Dixon	Chip Ganassi Racing	Honda
10	(Spain) Álex Palou	Chip Ganassi Racing	Honda
12	(Australia) Will Power	Team Penske	Chevrolet
14	(France) Sébastien Bourdais	A. J. Foyt Enterprises	Chevrolet
15	(United States) Graham Rahal	Rahal Letterman Lanigan Racing	Honda
18	(United Arab Emirates) Ed Jones	Dale Coyne Racing with Vasser-Sullivan	Honda
20	(United States) Conor Daly	Ed Carpenter Racing	Chevrolet
21	(Netherlands) Rinus VeeKay	Ed Carpenter Racing	Chevrolet
22	(France) Simon Pagenaud	Team Penske	Chevrolet
26	(United States) Colton Herta	Andretti Autosport with Curb-Agajanian	Honda
27	(United States) Alexander Rossi	Andretti Autosport	Honda
28	(United States) Ryan Hunter-Reay	Andretti Autosport	Honda
29	(Canada) James Hinchcliffe	Andretti Steinbrenner Autosport	Honda
30	(Japan) Takuma Sato	Rahal Letterman Lanigan Racing	Honda
45	(United States) Santino Ferrucci	Rahal Letterman Lanigan Racing	Honda
48	(United States) Jimmie Johnson R	Chip Ganassi Racing	Honda
51	(France) Romain Grosjean R	Dale Coyne Racing with Rick Ware Racing	Honda
52	(United States) Cody Ware R	Dale Coyne Racing with Rick Ware Racing	Honda
59	(United Kingdom) Max Chilton	Carlin	Chevrolet
60	(United Kingdom) Jack Harvey	Meyer Shank Racing	Honda

== Practice ==
=== Practice 1 ===
Practice 1 took place at 4:10 PM ET on August 6, 2021. The session was interrupted 22 minutes in by an accident involving Pato O'Ward, who clipped the wall in Turn 3 and crashed into the barrier on the opposite side. O'Ward was able to leave his damaged car uninjured. Another incident involving Conor Daly occurred towards the end of the session, as his car slid into the tire barrier after exiting the bridge section. Daly climbed out of his damaged car unharmed. Colton Herta topped the first ever practice session held at the Streets of Nashville with a time of 01:16.5875, besting Scott Dixon and rookie Romain Grosjean in second and third.

Top Practice Speeds
Pos	No.	Driver	Team	Engine	Lap Time
1	26	(United States) Colton Herta	Andretti Autosport with Curb-Agajanian	Honda	01:16.5875
2	9	(New Zealand) Scott Dixon	Chip Ganassi Racing	Honda	01:16.9653
3	51	(France) Romain Grosjean R	Dale Coyne Racing with Rick Ware Racing	Honda	01:17.1305

=== Practice 2 ===
Practice 2 took place at 1:00 PM ET on August 7, 2021. With six minutes remaining in the session, Alexander Rossi made contact with the concrete wall in Turn 10, dislodging his front wing and sending it under his car, causing suspension damage. Colton Herta went fastest for the second time in the weekend with a time of 01:15.3529, ahead of Andretti Autosport teammate Rossi in second and Scott Dixon in third.

Top Practice Speeds
Pos	No.	Driver	Team	Engine	Lap Time
1	26	(United States) Colton Herta	Andretti Autosport with Curb-Agajanian	Honda	01:15.3529
2	27	(United States) Alexander Rossi	Andretti Autosport	Honda	01:15.8292
3	9	(New Zealand) Scott Dixon	Chip Ganassi Racing	Honda	01:15.8837

== Qualifying ==
Qualifying took place at 4:30 PM ET on August 7, 2021.

In Round 1, Jimmie Johnson, who was sorted into the first group, experienced a heavy crash in Turn 10, wrecking his No. 48 Carvana Honda. This left Johnson unable to set a time in the session and reduced qualifying time for the other 12 drivers in the group, who only had three minutes and 20 seconds to set a lap.

During the final seconds of the Fast 12, Josef Newgarden crashed into the wall in Turn 11, causing major damage to the right side of his car. The incident also triggered a local yellow, hindering the laps of other drivers, which led to Newgarden losing his fastest lap, demoting him to last in the session and promoting Romain Grosjean into the Firestone Fast Six.

Colton Herta qualified first and took the first ever pole position of the Music City Grand Prix, with a time of 01:13.6835 and a gap of nearly six-tenths over Scott Dixon, who went second fastest. Championship leader Álex Palou finished third fastest, but would start the race ninth, as a result of a grid penalty given after an unapproved engine change.

=== Qualifying classification ===
Pos	No.	Driver	Team	Engine	Time				Final grid
Pos	No.	Driver	Team	Engine	Round 1		Round 2	Round 3	Final grid
Pos	No.	Driver	Team	Engine	Group 1	Group 2	Round 2	Round 3	Final grid
1	26	(United States) Colton Herta	Andretti Autosport with Curb-Agajanian	Honda	N/A	01:14.7067	01:14.7232	**01:13.6835**	1
2	9	(New Zealand) Scott Dixon	Chip Ganassi Racing	Honda	N/A	**01:14.6673**	01:14.8394	01:14.2327	2
3	10	(Spain) Álex Palou	Chip Ganassi Racing	Honda	**01:15.3385**	N/A	**01:14.4578**	01:14.6316	9^{1}
4	27	(United States) Alexander Rossi	Andretti Autosport	Honda	01:15.3721	N/A	01:14.5252	01:14.6646	3
5	7	(Sweden) Felix Rosenqvist	Arrow McLaren SP	Chevrolet	01:15.5305	N/A	01:14.8476	01:15.0045	4
6	51	(France) Romain Grosjean **R**	Dale Coyne Racing with Rick Ware Racing	Honda	N/A	01:15.3730	01:15.0078	01:15.3980	5
7	60	(United Kingdom) Jack Harvey	Meyer Shank Racing	Honda	N/A	01:15.2585	01:15.1309	N/A	6
8	22	(France) Simon Pagenaud	Team Penske	Chevrolet	N/A	01:15.3661	01:15.1354	N/A	7
9	5	(Mexico) Pato O'Ward	Arrow McLaren SP	Chevrolet	01:15.4160	N/A	01:15.1914	N/A	8
10	29	(Canada) James Hinchcliffe	Andretti Steinbrenner Autosport	Honda	N/A	01:15.2646	01:15.3255	N/A	10
11	12	(Australia) Will Power	Team Penske	Chevrolet	01:15.6309	N/A	01:15.5016	N/A	11
12	2	(United States) Josef Newgarden	Team Penske	Chevrolet	01:15.5474	N/A	01:15.5062	N/A	12
13	15	(United States) Graham Rahal	Rahal Letterman Lanigan Racing	Honda	01:16.1097	N/A	N/A	N/A	13
14	28	(United States) Ryan Hunter-Reay	Andretti Autosport	Honda	N/A	01:15.4984	N/A	N/A	14
15	06	(Brazil) Hélio Castroneves	Meyer Shank Racing	Honda	01:16.3479	N/A	N/A	N/A	15
16	14	(France) Sébastien Bourdais	A. J. Foyt Enterprises	Chevrolet	N/A	01:15.6055	N/A	N/A	16
17	45	(United States) Santino Ferrucci	Rahal Letterman Lanigan Racing	Honda	01:16.4647	N/A	N/A	N/A	17
18	8	(Sweden) Marcus Ericsson	Chip Ganassi Racing	Honda	N/A	01:15.6379	N/A	N/A	18
19	4	(Canada) Dalton Kellett	A. J. Foyt Enterprises	Chevrolet	01:17.1516	N/A	N/A	N/A	19
20	20	(United States) Conor Daly	Ed Carpenter Racing	Chevrolet	N/A	01:15.6685	N/A	N/A	20
21	59	(United Kingdom) Max Chilton	Carlin	Chevrolet	01:17.5553	N/A	N/A	N/A	21
22	21	(Netherlands) Rinus VeeKay	Ed Carpenter Racing	Chevrolet	N/A	01:15.7029	N/A	N/A	22
23	3	(New Zealand) Scott McLaughlin **R**	Team Penske	Chevrolet	01:18.1899	N/A	N/A	N/A	22
24	30	(Japan) Takuma Sato	Rahal Letterman Lanigan Racing	Honda	N/A	01:15.8503	N/A	N/A	24
25	48	(United States) Jimmie Johnson **R**	Chip Ganassi Racing	Honda	No Time	N/A	N/A	N/A	25
26	18	(United Arab Emirates) Ed Jones	Dale Coyne Racing with Vasser-Sullivan	Honda	N/A	01:15.8770	N/A	N/A	26
27	52	(United States) Cody Ware **R**	Dale Coyne Racing with Rick Ware Racing	Honda	N/A	01:18.0928	N/A	N/A	27

Notes

- **Bold text** indicates fastest time set in session.
- **^1** - Álex Palou received a nine-place grid penalty following an unapproved engine change during a test at the Portland International Raceway a week prior to the race.

== Race ==
=== Race report ===
The race started at 5:30 pm ET on August 8, 2021. As a result of his accident during qualifying, Jimmie Johnson started with a NTT Data-liveried car, as his No. 48 Carvana Honda was deemed too damaged to be used for the race. The first lap went underway with a rolling start on the Korean War Veterans Memorial Bridge and saw no incidents occur, with polesitter Colton Herta leading the race.

==== First, second, and third caution ====
On lap 2, Dalton Kellett stalled his car on the Front Straight, bringing out the first caution of the day, to allow his car to be restarted. The caution lasted two laps. Moments before the race returned to green flag conditions on lap 4, Marcus Ericsson crashed into the rear of Sebastién Bourdais' car, briefly sending Ericsson airborne, causing terminal damage to Bourdais' car, forcing him to end his race prematurely. This incident caused a four-lap caution period, lasting until lap 8. Ericsson's car was left mostly unscathed, apart from a heavily damaged front wing, which was promptly replaced in a pit stop. Ericsson was forced to restart from the back of the grid due to emergency service in a closed pit, and also received a stop-and-go penalty for the incident with Bourdais.

On lap 16, Ed Jones made light contact with Scott McLaughlin in Turn 4, which led to McLaughlin losing control of his car and becoming momentarily stationary, triggering the third caution of the race, which lasted three laps. Jones was later given with a drive-through penalty for avoidable contact.

==== Fourth caution and first red flag ====
Shortly after the race was green flagged again on lap 20, another caution was brought on, as drivers attempted to overtake in the narrow section leading up to Turn 11. Will Power overtook Simon Pagenaud, whilst making contact, which caused Pagenaud to crash into the wall in Turn 11. Santino Ferrucci brushed the rear of Pagenaud's car, but was able to continue, along with Power. Rinus VeeKay, who was on the outside of Pagenaud, ended up in the wall next to the Penske driver. Takuma Sato was unable to avoid VeeKay and Pagenaud and was forced to stop behind both drivers, also making contact with the rears of both cars. Behind Sato was Jimmie Johnson, facing the wrong direction after being spun by Cody Ware, who lost his front wing in the process and also came to a halt. Johnson was also hit by teammate Álex Palou, who was also unable to stop in time. This culminated in a bottleneck in Turn 11, forcing James Hinchcliffe, Ryan Hunter-Reay, Josef Newgarden, Conor Daly, and Hélio Castroneves to a halt.

A two-lap caution period was first brought out on lap 20. Afterwards, the race was red flagged as stewards cleared the blockage on track, with Herta still in the lead. During the stoppage, Johnson was disqualified from the race after his team illegally worked on his car under the red flag conditions.

==== Fifth caution ====
On lap 31, VeeKay crashed into the wall and stalled his car near pit exit, prompting the fifth caution of the race to be brought on. During the caution, Herta made a pit stop from the lead and emerged fourth, with Ericsson, who had been relegated to last earlier in the race, in the lead. The caution lasted five laps.

By lap 38, Herta had overtaken Hinchcliffe and Hunter-Reay to climb back to second place, behind Ericsson.

==== Sixth, seventh, and eighth caution ====
On lap 41, Power nudged teammate McLaughlin into a spin in Turn 9. Kellett crashed in the wall shortly after the exit of Turn 9, after failing to avoid McLaughlin, who was sideways and stationary near the middle of the track. This caused another caution to be triggered, which lasted nine laps, making it the longest caution period of the race. Power was subsequently awarded a drive-through penalty for avoidable contact. During this caution period, Ericsson pitted, handing the lead to Herta on lap 45.

On lap 51, Pato O'Ward made contact with Alexander Rossi as O'Ward attempted an overtake on Rossi in Turn 4, which ended with O'Ward hitting the tire barriers and both drivers briefly stationary. This caused the seventh caution of the race, which lasted two laps. O'Ward was consequently given a stop-and-go penalty for failure to yield to safety and a drive-through penalty for avoidable contact.

On lap 55, Ware spun and stalled in Turn 3, triggering the eighth caution of the race, lasting two laps. Ware would later be disqualified from the race for failure to participate at competitive speed.

Romain Grosjean briefly held the lead for four laps from lap 52, after Herta made his pit stop. Grosjean then relinquished his lead to Ericsson after making his pit stop.

On lap 68, Grosjean made slight contact with Pagenaud, which sent Pagenaud into the wall, resulting in damage to the Pagenaud's suspension, which caused the Penske driver to retire from the race. Grosjean was then penalized with a drive-through penalty for avoidable contact.

==== Ninth caution and second red flag ====
Herta, who was just over a second behind race leader Ericsson at the time, crashed heavily into the barriers in Turn 9 on lap 75, after his tires locked up during corner entry. His No. 26 Gainbridge Honda car was terminally damaged, effectively ending his fight for the win. The crash triggered the ninth and final caution of the race, which lasted three laps. The second red flag of the day was then triggered to repair the damaged tire barrier and extract the wrecked car from the track.

==== Finish ====
The race returned to green flag conditions on lap 78. Ericsson took victory in the inaugural event despite his incident early in the race, with Chip Ganassi Racing teammate Scott Dixon finishing second. Hinchcliffe completed the podium places with his third place finish. Despite his crash, Herta led the most laps of the race. In total, the race had nine caution periods and two red flag, resulting in a total of 33 of the event's 80 laps run under caution conditions. It also saw two drivers, Johnson and Ware, disqualified from the race.

=== Race classification ===
Pos	No.	Driver	Team	Engine	Laps	Time/Retired	Pit Stops	Grid	Laps Led	Pts.
1	8	(Sweden) Marcus Ericsson	Chip Ganassi Racing	Honda	80	2:18:49.8305	5	18	37	51
2	9	(New Zealand) Scott Dixon	Chip Ganassi Racing	Honda	80	+1.5596	2	2		40
3	29	(Canada) James Hinchcliffe	Andretti Steinbrenner Autosport	Honda	80	+2.8015	2	10		35
4	28	(United States) Ryan Hunter-Reay	Andretti Autosport	Honda	80	+4.0833	2	14		32
5	15	(United States) Graham Rahal	Rahal Letterman Lanigan Racing	Honda	80	+4.7715	2	13		30
6	18	(United Arab Emirates) Ed Jones	Dale Coyne Racing with Vasser-Sullivan	Honda	80	+4.7715	2	26		28
7	10	(Spain) Álex Palou	Chip Ganassi Racing	Honda	80	+5.5333	2	9		26
8	7	(Sweden) Felix Rosenqvist	Arrow McLaren SP	Chevrolet	80	+5.9667	2	4		24
9	06	(Brazil) Hélio Castroneves	Meyer Shank Racing	Honda	80	+6.7874	2	15		22
10	2	(United States) Josef Newgarden	Team Penske	Chevrolet	80	+7.5286	2	12		20
11	45	(United States) Santino Ferrucci	Rahal Letterman Lanigan Racing	Honda	80	+8.4929	4	17		19
12	20	(United States) Conor Daly	Ed Carpenter Racing	Chevrolet	80	+8.8320	2	20		18
13	5	(Mexico) Pato O'Ward	Arrow McLaren SP	Chevrolet	80	+9.1207	3	8		17
14	12	(Australia) Will Power	Team Penske	Chevrolet	80	+9.5956	3	11		16
15	60	(United Kingdom) Jack Harvey	Meyer Shank Racing	Honda	80	+11.0919	2	6		15
16	51	(France) Romain Grosjean R	Dale Coyne Racing with Rick Ware Racing	Honda	80	+12.5295	2	5	4	15
17	27	(United States) Alexander Rossi	Andretti Autosport	Honda	80	+16.5295	2	3		13
18	59	(United Kingdom) Max Chilton	Carlin	Chevrolet	80	+24.8453	5	21		12
19	26	(United States) Colton Herta	Andretti Autosport with Curb-Agajanian	Honda	74	Contact	2	1	39	15
20	52	(United States) Cody Ware R	Dale Coyne Racing with Rick Ware Racing	Honda	70	Contact^{1}	2	27		10
21	22	(France) Simon Pagenaud	Team Penske	Chevrolet	68	Contact	2	7		9
22	3	(New Zealand) Scott McLaughlin R	Team Penske	Chevrolet	67	+13 Laps	2	23		8
23	4	(Canada) Dalton Kellett	A. J. Foyt Enterprises	Chevrolet	37	Contact	1	19		7
24	21	(Netherlands) Rinus VeeKay	Ed Carpenter Racing	Chevrolet	24	Contact	0	22		6
25	30	(Japan) Takuma Sato	Rahal Letterman Lanigan Racing	Honda	19	Contact	0	24		5
26	48	(United States) Jimmie Johnson R	Chip Ganassi Racing	Honda	18	Contact^{2}	1	25		5
27	14	(France) Sébastien Bourdais	A. J. Foyt Enterprises	Chevrolet	5	Contact	0	16		5
Fastest lap: (United States) Colton Herta (Andretti Autosport with Curb-Agajanian) – 01:16.3064 (lap 30)

Notes

- ^1 - Cody Ware was disqualified for failing to participate at competitive speed.
- ^2 - Jimmie Johnson was disqualified due to unapproved work on car under red flag conditions.

== Championship standings after the race ==
Álex Palou maintained his lead of the championship. Scott Dixon was promoted to second, following his second place finish. Pato O'Ward was relegated to third, after only managing to finish 13th. Race winner Marcus Ericsson narrowed the gap to fourth-placed Josef Newgarden to four points.

Drivers' Championship standings

	Pos.	Driver	Points
Unchanged	1	(Spain) Álex Palou	410
1	2	(New Zealand) Scott Dixon	368
1	3	(Mexico) Pato O'Ward	362
Unchanged	4	(United States) Josef Newgarden	335
Unchanged	5	(Sweden) Marcus Ericsson	331

Engine manufacturer standings

	Pos.	Manufacturer	Points
Unchanged	1	Honda	959
Unchanged	2	Chevrolet	840

- Note: Only the top five positions are included.

Previous race: 2021 Honda Indy 200	IndyCar Series; 2021 season	Next race: 2021 Big Machine Spiked Coolers Grand Prix
Previous race: 2008 Firestone Indy 200; Nashville Superspeedway	Music City Grand Prix	Next race: 2022 Big Machine Music City Grand Prix
