= R. C. Enerson =

American racing driver (born 1997)

- Born: Richard Clayton Enerson; March 6, 1997 (age 29); New Port Richey, Florida, U.S.

IndyCar Series career
- 6 races run over 4 years
- Team: No. 50 (Abel Motorsports)
- 2023 position: 36th
- Best finish: 28th (2016)
- First race: 2016 Honda Indy 200 (Mid-Ohio)
- Last race: 2023 Indianapolis 500 (Indianapolis)
Wins	Podiums	Poles
0	0	0

NASCAR Cup Series career
- 1 race run over 1 year
- Best finish: 39th (2021)
- First race: 2021 Go Bowling at The Glen (Watkins Glen)
Wins	Top tens	Poles
0	0	0

Previous series
- 2015-2016 2013-2014: Indy Lights; U.S. F2000 National Championship

Richard Clayton Enerson (born March 6, 1997) is an American professional racing driver. He is the son of former Indy Lights team owner Neil Enerson, who owned Team E Racing. He last competed part-time in the NASCAR Xfinity Series, driving the No. 14 Chevrolet Camaro for SS-Green Light Racing.

== Racing career ==
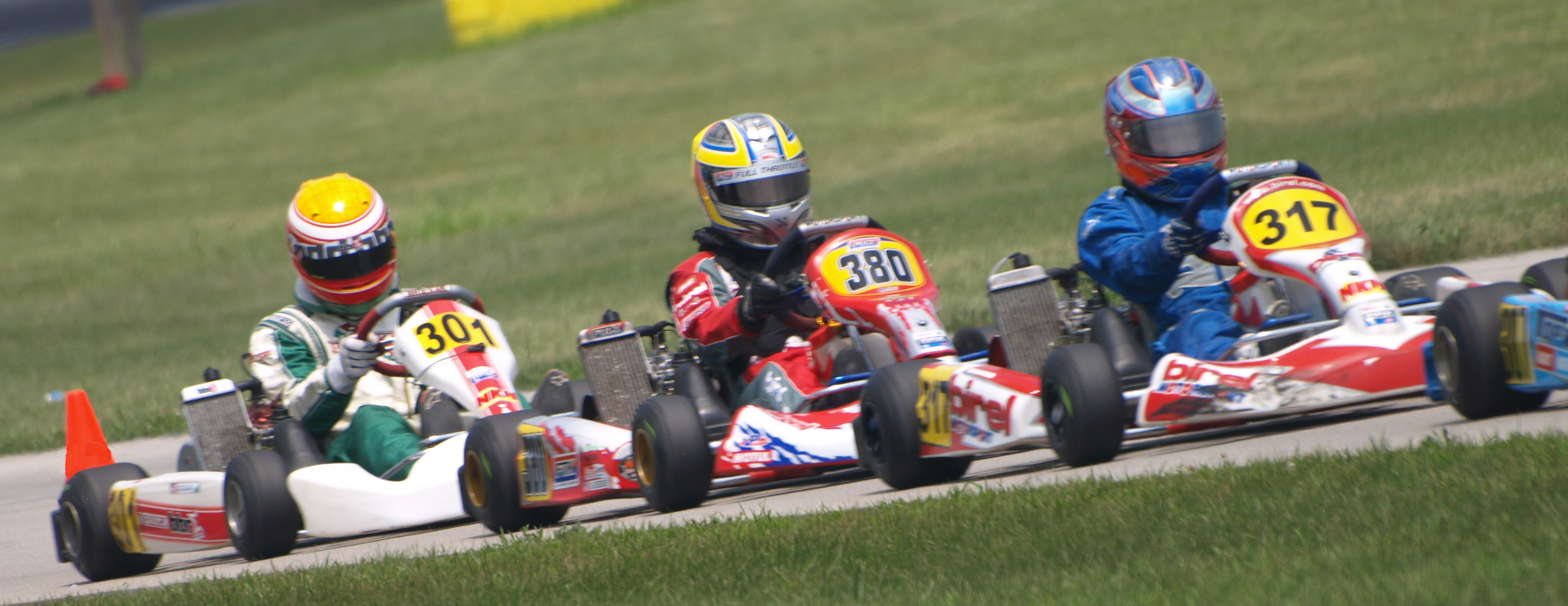
Enerson (No. 317) competing in the 2010 Rotax Max Challenge Junior race

After participating in karting and Skip Barber regional racing, Enerson made his professional debut in the 2012 U.S. F2000 National Championship in National Class. He finished in third place with four class victories. He returned to the series in 2013 driving for ZSports/Team E and finished ninth in the championship with two podium finishes at Mid-Ohio Sports Car Course. Enerson switched to his family's own team for the 2014 U.S. F2000 Winterfest and won the championship, capturing two wins and two other podium finishes in the six races. In the 2014 U.S. F2000 National Championship, Enerson finished second in the championship by only nine points behind champion Florian Latorre. Enerson won five races, the most of any driver that season, including a sweep of both races at Barber Motorsports Park.

Enerson moved two steps up the Mazda Road to Indy in 2015, competing in the Indy Lights series with Schmidt Peterson Motorsports. Enerson took his first Indy Lights victory with Schmidt Peterson Motorsports at Mid-Ohio Sports Car Course after four podiums in the 2015 season.

Enerson started 2016 competing in Indy Lights again, but following the Freedom 100, he dropped out of the series to pursue a seat in the IndyCar Series. This paid off later in the season, when Dale Coyne Racing signed him to drive at Mid-Ohio, then later extended his contract to include Watkins Glen and Sonoma.

Enerson drove the No. 31 car of Carlin Racing at the 2019 Honda 200 in the NTT IndyCar Series.

On August 3, 2020, it was announced that Enerson would compete in his first NASCAR race, driving in the Xfinity Series race at Road America in the No. 07 for SS-Green Light Racing.

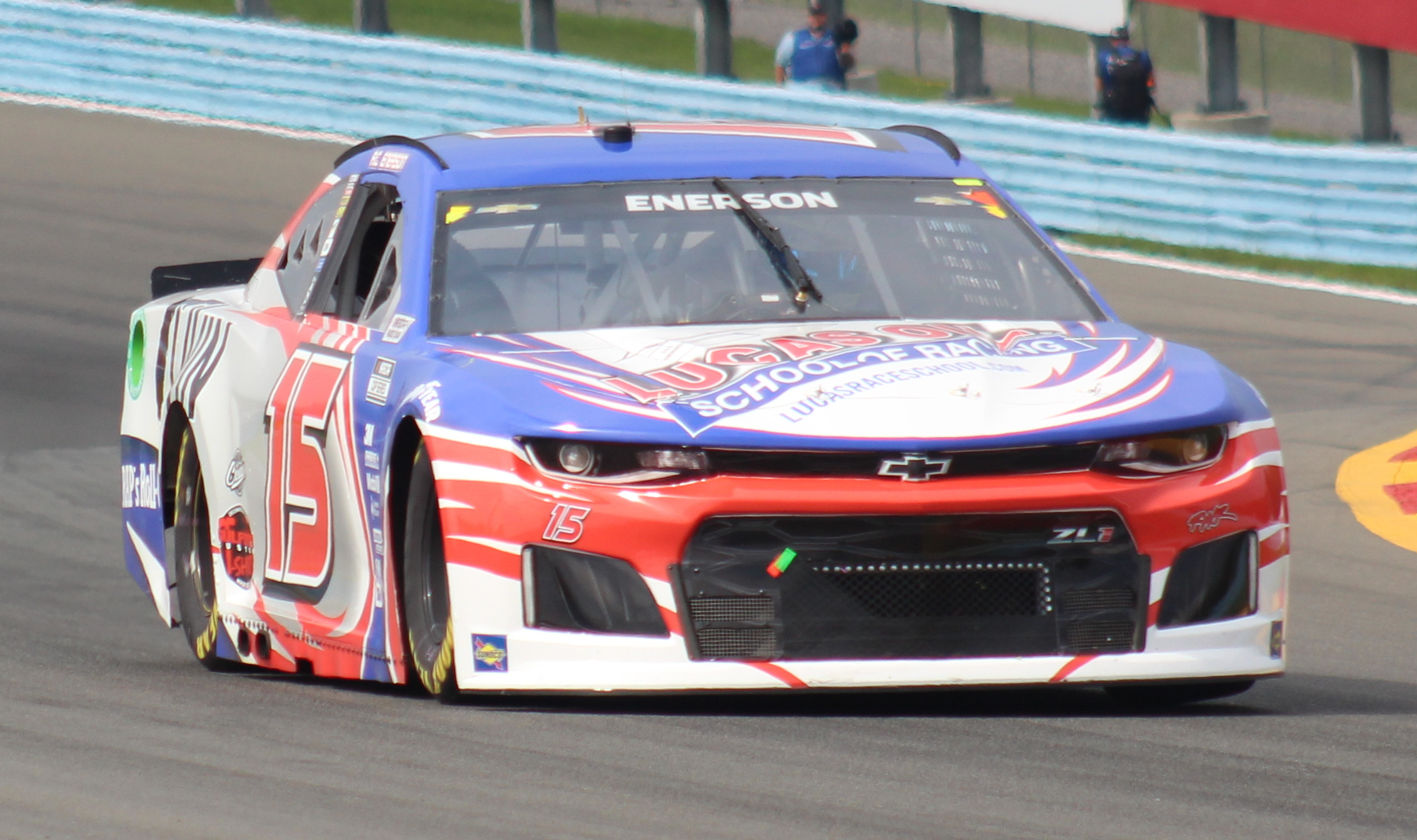
Enerson's NASCAR Cup car at Watkins Glen in 2021

Enerson and his father Neil Enerson purchased two complete Dallara DW12 Indycar chassis. A deal was struck with IndyCar newcomers Top Gun Racing to loan the chassis, as well as additional equipment, to the team so that Enerson could be entered in the series. On May 10, 2021, Enerson took part in a test session with Top Gun Racing at World Wide Technology Raceway. On May 12, IndyCar confirmed that Enerson and Top Gun Racing would attempt to qualify for the 2021 Indianapolis 500. After taking part in the last row shootout, Enerson failed to qualify for the 2021 Indianapolis 500.

Enerson and his father were later embroiled in a legal dispute with Top Gun Racing for the return of the two chassis and the equipment loaned earlier in the season. This was finally resolved in May 2022. Following this, Enerson and his father announced that plans were underway to enter the 2023 IndyCar Series. In mid-April, it was announced that Enerson had reached an agreement with Abel Motorsports to field his entry into the 2023 Indianapolis 500.

== Motorsports career results ==
=== American open–wheel racing ===
(key) (Races in bold indicate pole position; races in italics indicate fastest lap)

==== U.S. F2000 National Championship ====
Year	Team	1	2	3	4	5	6	7	8	9	10	11	12	13	14	Rank	Points
2013	ZSports Team E Racing	SEB; 30	SEB; 18	STP; 8	STP; 12	LOR; DNS	TOR; 5	TOR; 20	MOH; 2	MOH; 4	MOH; 3	LAG; 12	LAG; 10	HOU; 20	HOU; 9	**9th**	**143**
2014	Team E	STP; 2	STP; 1	BAR; 1	BAR; 1	IMS; 7	IMS; 10	LOR; 16	TOR; 3	TOR; 17	MOH; 1	MOH; 8	MOH; 3	SNM; 1	SNM; 2	**2nd**	**301**

==== Indy Lights ====
Year	Team	1	2	3	4	5	6	7	8	9	10	11	12	13	14	15	16	17	18	Rank	Points
2015	Schmidt Peterson Motorsports	STP; 9	STP; 13	LBH; 4	ALA; 3	ALA; 7	IMS; 5	IMS; 2	INDY; 4	TOR; 8	TOR; 5	MIL; 2	IOW; 3	**MOH**; 1	MOH; 4	LAG; 6	LAG; 6			4th	295
2016	Schmidt Peterson Motorsports	STP; 5	STP; 12	PHX; 3	ALA; 6	ALA; 4	IMS; 8	IMS; 15	INDY; 11	RDA	RDA	IOW	TOR	TOR	MOH	MOH	WGL	LAG	LAG	14th	111

==== IndyCar Series ====
Year	Team	No.	Chassis	Engine	1	2	3	4	5	6	7	8	9	10	11	12	13	14	15	16	17	Rank	Points	Ref
2016	Dale Coyne Racing	19	Dallara DW12	Honda	STP	PHX	LBH	ALA	IMS	INDY	DET	DET	RDA	IOW	TOR	MOH; 19	POC	TXS	WGL; 9	SNM; 19		28th	55	
2019	Carlin	31	Dallara DW12	Chevrolet	STP	COA	ALA	LBH	IMS	INDY	DET	DET	TXS	RDA	TOR	IOW	MOH; 17	POC	GTW	POR	LAG	35th	13	
2021	Top Gun Racing	75	Dallara DW12	Chevrolet	ALA	STP	TXS	TXS	IMS	INDY; DNQ	DET	DET	ROA	MOH	NSH	IMS; 28	GTW	POR	LAG	LBH		43rd	5	
2023	Abel Motorsports	50	Dallara DW12	Chevrolet	STP	TXS	LBH	ALA	IMS	INDY; 32	DET	ROA	MOH	TOR	IOW	IOW	NSH	IMS	GTW	POR	LAG	36th	5	

==== Indianapolis 500 ====
Year	Chassis	Engine	Start	Finish	Team
2021	Dallara	Chevrolet	DNQ		Top Gun Racing
2023	Dallara	Chevrolet	28	32	Abel Motorsports

=== IMSA SportsCar Championship ===
Year	Entrant	Class	Chassis	Engine	1	2	3	4	5	6	7	8	9	10	Rank	Points
2017	PR1/Mathiasen Motorsports	P	Ligier JS P217	Gibson GK428 4.2 L V8	DAY; 9	SEB	LBH	COA	DET	WGL	MOS	ELK	LGA	PET	36th	22

=== NASCAR ===
(key) (Bold – Pole position awarded by qualifying time. Italics – Pole position earned by points standings or practice time. * – Most laps led.)

==== Cup Series ====
NASCAR Cup Series results
Year	Team	No.	Make	1	2	3	4	5	6	7	8	9	10	11	12	13	14	15	16	17	18	19	20	21	22	23	24	25	26	27	28	29	30	31	32	33	34	35	36	NCSC	Pts	Ref
2021	Rick Ware Racing	15	Chevy	DAY	DAY	HOM	LVS	PHO	ATL	BRI	MAR	RCH	TAL	KAN	DAR	DOV	COA	CLT	SON	NSH	POC	POC	ROA	ATL	NHA	GLN; 34	IND	MCH	DAY	DAR	RCH	BRI	LVS	TAL	CLT	TEX	KAN	MAR	PHO	39th	3	

==== Xfinity Series ====
NASCAR Xfinity Series results
Year	Team	No.	Make	1	2	3	4	5	6	7	8	9	10	11	12	13	14	15	16	17	18	19	20	21	22	23	24	25	26	27	28	29	30	31	32	33	NXSC	Pts	Ref
2020	SS-Green Light Racing	07	Chevy	DAY	LVS	CAL	PHO	DAR	CLT	BRI	ATL	HOM	HOM	TAL	POC	IND	KEN	KEN	KAN	TEX	ROA; 20	DAY	DOV	DOV	DAY	DAR	RCH	RCH	BRI	LVS	TAL	CLT	KAN	TEX	MAR	PHO	61st	18	
2024	SS-Green Light Racing	14	Chevy	DAY	ATL	LVS	PHO	COA; 28	RCH	MAR	TEX	TAL	DOV	DAR	CLT	PIR	SON	IOW	NHA	NSH	CSC	POC	IND	MCH	DAY	DAR	ATL	GLN; 27	BRI	KAN	TAL	ROV	LVS	HOM	MAR	PHO	64th	19	

^{*} Season still in progress
^{1} Ineligible for series points
