= 2021 Genesys 300 =

Third round of the 2021 IndyCar Series

(United States) 2021 Genesys 300
Race details
3rd round of the 2021 IndyCar season
← Previous race	Next race →
- Layout of the Texas Motor Speedway
- Date: May 1, 2021
- Official name: Genesys 300
- Location: Texas Motor Speedway, Fort Worth, Texas
- Course: Permanent racing facility 1.5 mi / 2.4 km
- Distance: 212 laps 318.00 mi / 511.711 km

Pole position
- Driver: (New Zealand) (Spain) Álex Palou (Chip Ganassi Racing)
- Time: No time (Note: Qualifying was cancelled due to rain. As a result, the starting order was determined based on the driver standings prior to the race.)

Fastest lap
- Driver: (Sweden) (Sweden) Marcus Ericsson (Chip Ganassi Racing)
- Time: 00:23:66 (on lap 124 of 212)

Podium
- First: (New Zealand) (New Zealand) Scott Dixon (Chip Ganassi Racing)
- Second: (New Zealand) (New Zealand) Scott McLaughlin (Team Penske)
- Third: (Mexico) (Mexico) Pato O'Ward (Arrow McLaren SP)

The 2021 Genesys 300 was an IndyCar motor race held on May 1, 2021, at the Texas Motor Speedway. It was the third round of the 2021 IndyCar Series. Scott Dixon of Chip Gannasi Racing led a dominating 206 laps on route to his first victory of the season.

== Entrants ==
Key	Meaning
R	Rookie
W	Past winner

No.	Driver	Team	Engine
2	(United States) Josef Newgarden W	Team Penske	Chevrolet
3	(New Zealand) Scott McLaughlin R	Team Penske	Chevrolet
4	(Canada) Dalton Kellett	A. J. Foyt Enterprises	Chevrolet
5	(Mexico) Patricio O'Ward	Arrow McLaren SP	Chevrolet
7	(Sweden) Felix Rosenqvist	Arrow McLaren SP	Chevrolet
8	(Sweden) Marcus Ericsson	Chip Ganassi Racing	Honda
9	(New Zealand) Scott Dixon W	Chip Ganassi Racing	Honda
10	(Spain) Álex Palou	Chip Ganassi Racing	Honda
12	(Australia) Will Power W	Team Penske	Chevrolet
14	(France) Sébastien Bourdais	A. J. Foyt Enterprises	Chevrolet
15	(United States) Graham Rahal W	Rahal Letterman Lanigan Racing	Honda
18	(United Arab Emirates) Ed Jones	Dale Coyne Racing with Vasser-Sullivan	Honda
20	(United States) Ed Carpenter W	Ed Carpenter Racing	Chevrolet
21	(Netherlands) Rinus VeeKay	Ed Carpenter Racing	Chevrolet
22	(France) Simon Pagenaud	Team Penske	Chevrolet
26	(United States) Colton Herta W	Andretti Autosport	Honda
27	(United States) Alexander Rossi	Andretti Autosport	Honda
28	(United States) Ryan Hunter-Reay	Andretti Autosport	Honda
29	(Canada) James Hinchcliffe	Andretti Steinbrenner Autosport	Honda
30	(Japan) Takuma Sato	Rahal Letterman Lanigan Racing	Honda
48	(Brazil) Tony Kanaan W	Chip Ganassi Racing	Honda
51	(Brazil) Pietro Fittipaldi	Dale Coyne Racing with Rick Ware Racing	Honda
59	(United States) Conor Daly	Carlin	Chevrolet
60	(United Kingdom) Jack Harvey	Meyer Shank Racing	Honda

== Practice ==
=== Practice 1 ===
Tony Kanaan topped the first practice charts with a time of 00:23:55, besting Pato O'Ward in second and Takuma Sato in third.

Top Practice Speeds
Pos	No.	Driver	Team	Engine	Lap Time
1	48	(Brazil) Tony Kanaan W	Chip Ganassi Racing	Honda	00:23:55
2	5	(Mexico) Pato O'Ward	Arrow McLaren SP	Chevrolet	00:23:57
3	30	(Japan) Takuma Sato	Rahal Letterman Lanigan Racing	Honda	00:23:58

== Qualifying ==
Qualifying was canceled due to rain. Consequently, qualifying results and the starting grid were set based on the entrant point standings after the Firestone Grand Prix of St. Petersburg. Championship leader Álex Palou was awarded pole.

=== Qualifying classification ===
Pos	No.	Driver	Team	Engine					
Pos	No.	Driver	Team	Engine	1	10	(Spain) Álex Palou	Chip Ganassi Racing	Honda
Pos	No.	Driver	Team	Engine	2	12	(Australia) Will Power W	Team Penske	Chevrolet
3	9	(New Zealand) Scott Dixon W	Chip Ganassi Racing	Honda					
4	26	(United States) Colton Herta	Andretti Autosport	Honda					
5	22	(France) Simon Pagenaud	Team Penske	Chevrolet					
6	60	(United Kingdom) Jack Harvey	Meyer Shank Racing	Chevrolet					
7	14	(France) Sebastien Bourdais	A. J. Foyt Racing	Chevrolet					
8	21	(Netherlands) Rinus Veekay	Ed Carpenter Racing	Chevrolet					
9	8	(Sweden) Marcus Ericsson	Chip Ganassi Racing	Honda					
10	2	(United States) Josef Newgarden W	Team Penske	Chevrolet					
11	5	(Mexico) Pato O'Ward	Arrow McLaren SP	Chevrolet					
12	30	(Japan) Takuma Sato	Rahal Letterman Lanigan Racing	Honda					
13	15	(United States) Graham Rahal W	Rahal Letterman Lanigan Racing	Honda					
14	51	(Brazil) Pietro Fittipaldi	Dale Coyne Racing with Rick Ware Racing	Honda					
15	3	(New Zealand) Scott McLaughlin R	Team Penske	Chevrolet					
16	27	(United States) Alexander Rossi	Andretti Autosport	Honda					
17	20	(United States) Ed Carpenter W	Ed Carpenter Racing	Chevrolet					
18	7	(Sweden) Felix Rosenqvist	Arrow McLaren SP	Chevrolet					
19	18	(United Arab Emirates) Ed Jones	Dale Coyne Racing with Vasser-Sullivan	Honda					
20	29	(Canada) James Hinchcliffe	Andretti Steinbrenner Autosport	Honda					
21	28	(United States) Ryan Hunter-Reay	Andretti Autosport	Honda					
22	4	(Canada) Dalton Kellett	A. J. Foyt Enterprises	Chevrolet					
23	48	(Brazil) Tony Kanaan W	Chip Ganassi Racing	Honda					
24	59	(United States) Conor Daly	Carlin	Chevrolet					

== Race ==
=== Race classification ===
Pos	No.	Driver	Team	Engine	Laps	Time/Retired	Pit Stops	Grid	Laps Led	Pts.
1	9	(New Zealand) Scott Dixon W	Chip Ganassi Racing	Honda	212	01:45:51.34	3	3	206	53
2	3	(New Zealand) Scott McLaughlin R	Team Penske	Chevrolet	212	+0.2646	3	15		40
3	5	(Mexico) Pato O'Ward	Arrow McLaren SP	Chevrolet	212	+1.7807	3	11		35
4	10	(Spain) Álex Palou	Chip Ganassi Racing	Honda	212	+2.8561	3	1	6	33
5	15	(United States) Graham Rahal W	Rahal Letterman Lanigan Racing	Honda	212	+6.6040	4	13		30
6	2	(United States) Josef Newgarden W	Team Penske	Chevrolet	212	+7.9030	3	10		28
7	60	(United Kingdom) Jack Harvey	Meyer Shank Racing	Honda	212	+8.5046	3	6		26
8	27	(United States) Alexander Rossi	Andretti Autosport	Honda	212	+9.5898	3	16		24
9	30	(Japan) Takuma Sato	Rahal Letterman Lanigan Racing	Honda	212	+10.0657	4	12		22
10	22	(France) Simon Pagenaud	Team Penske	Chevrolet	212	+10.4271	3	5		20
11	48	(Brazil) Tony Kanaan W	Chip Ganassi Racing	Honda	212	+12.0188	3	23		19
12	18	(United Arab Emirates) Ed Jones	Dale Coyne Racing with Vasser-Sullivan	Honda	212	+12.5785	3	19		18
13	7	(Sweden) Felix Rosenqvist	Arrow McLaren SP	Chevrolet	212	+12.9479	3	18		17
14	12	(Australia) Will Power	Team Penske	Chevrolet	212	+14.3546	3	2		16
15	51	(Brazil) Pietro Fittipaldi	Dale Coyne Racing with Rick Ware Racing	Honda	212	+15.0507	3	14		15
16	28	(United States) Ryan Hunter-Reay	Andretti Autosport	Honda	212	+17.4939	3	21		14
17	20	(United States) Ed Carpenter W	Ed Carpenter Racing	Chevrolet	212	+19.8938	3	17		13
18	4	(Canada) Dalton Kellett	A. J. Foyt Enterprises	Chevrolet	212	+23.9568	3	22		12
19	8	(Sweden) Marcus Ericsson	Chip Ganassi Racing	Honda	211	+1 Lap	3	9		11
20	21	(Netherlands) Rinus VeeKay	Ed Carpenter Racing	Chevrolet	211	+1 Lap	3	8		10
21	59	(United States) Conor Daly	Carlin	Chevrolet	211	+1 Lap	3	24		9
22	26	(United States) Colton Herta	Andretti Autosport	Honda	190	Mechanical	3	4		8
23	29	(Canada) James Hinchcliffe	Andretti Steinbrenner Autosport	Honda	158	Contact	2	20		7
24	14	(France) Sébastien Bourdais	A. J. Foyt Enterprises	Honda	55	Contact	0	14		6
Fastest lap: (Sweden) Marcus Ericsson (Chip Ganassi Racing) – 00:23.6606 (lap 8)

== Championship standings after the race ==
Drivers' Championship standings

Pos.	Driver	Points
1	(New Zealand) Scott Dixon	118
2	(Spain) Álex Palou	100
3	(Australia) Will Power	81
4	(Mexico) Patricio O'Ward	80
5	(United Kingdom) Jack Harvey	77

Engine manufacturer standings

Pos.	Manufacturer	Points
1	Honda	265
2	Chevrolet	223

- Note: Only the top five positions are included.

Previous race: 2021 Firestone Grand Prix of St. Petersburg	IndyCar Series; 2021 season	Next race: 2021 XPEL 375
Previous race: 2020 Genesys 300	Genesys 300	Next race: 2021 XPEL 375
