= 2021 XPEL 375 =

Fourth round of the 2021 IndyCar Series

(United States) 2021 XPEL 375
Race details
4th round of the 2021 IndyCar season
← Previous race	Next race →
- Layout of the Texas Motor Speedway
- Date: May 2, 2021
- Official name: XPEL 375
- Location: Texas Motor Speedway, Fort Worth, Texas
- Course: Permanent racing facility 1.5 mi / 2.4 km
- Distance: 248 laps 360.84 mi / 580.72 km

Pole position
- Driver: (New Zealand) (New Zealand) Scott Dixon (Chip Ganassi Racing)
- Time: No time (Note: Qualifying was canceled due to weather delays. As a result, the starting order was determined based on the driver standings prior to the race.)

Fastest lap
- Driver: (Spain) (Spain) Álex Palou (Chip Ganassi Racing)
- Time: 00:23:85 (on lap 10 of 248)

Podium
- First: (Mexico) (Mexico) Pato O'Ward (Arrow McLaren SP)
- Second: (United States) (United States) Josef Newgarden (Team Penske)
- Third: (United States) (United States) Graham Rahal (Rahal Letterman Lanigan Racing)

The 2021 XPEL 375 was an IndyCar motor race held on May 2, 2021, at the Texas Motor Speedway. It was the fourth round of the 2021 IndyCar Series. Pato O'Ward of Arrow McLaren SP captured the lead late in the race to score his first career IndyCar series victory.

== Entrants ==
Key	Meaning
R	Rookie
W	Past winner

No.	Driver	Team	Engine
2	(United States) Josef Newgarden W	Team Penske	Chevrolet
3	(New Zealand) Scott McLaughlin R	Team Penske	Chevrolet
4	(Canada) Dalton Kellett	A. J. Foyt Enterprises	Chevrolet
5	(Mexico) Patricio O'Ward	Arrow McLaren SP	Chevrolet
7	(Sweden) Felix Rosenqvist	Arrow McLaren SP	Chevrolet
8	(Sweden) Marcus Ericsson	Chip Ganassi Racing	Honda
9	(New Zealand) Scott Dixon W	Chip Ganassi Racing	Honda
10	(Spain) Álex Palou	Chip Ganassi Racing	Honda
12	(Australia) Will Power W	Team Penske	Chevrolet
14	(France) Sébastien Bourdais	A. J. Foyt Enterprises	Chevrolet
15	(United States) Graham Rahal W	Rahal Letterman Lanigan Racing	Honda
18	(United Arab Emirates) Ed Jones	Dale Coyne Racing with Vasser-Sullivan	Honda
20	(United States) Ed Carpenter W	Ed Carpenter Racing	Chevrolet
21	(Netherlands) Rinus VeeKay	Ed Carpenter Racing	Chevrolet
22	(France) Simon Pagenaud	Team Penske	Chevrolet
26	(United States) Colton Herta W	Andretti Autosport	Honda
27	(United States) Alexander Rossi	Andretti Autosport	Honda
28	(United States) Ryan Hunter-Reay	Andretti Autosport	Honda
29	(Canada) James Hinchcliffe	Andretti Steinbrenner Autosport	Honda
30	(Japan) Takuma Sato	Rahal Letterman Lanigan Racing	Honda
48	(Brazil) Tony Kanaan W	Chip Ganassi Racing	Honda
51	(Brazil) Pietro Fittipaldi	Dale Coyne Racing with Rick Ware Racing	Honda
59	(United States) Conor Daly	Carlin	Chevrolet
60	(United Kingdom) Jack Harvey	Meyer Shank Racing	Honda

== Qualifying ==
No qualifying session took place for the race, as officials were forced to cancel the session due to weather delays. As a result, qualifying results and the starting lineup for the race were determined based on the driver standings after the previous race, the Genesys 300. As the points leader, Scott Dixon was awarded pole position.

=== Qualifying classification ===
Pos	No.	Driver	Team	Engine					
Pos	No.	Driver	Team	Engine	1	9	(New Zealand) Scott Dixon W	Chip Ganassi Racing	Honda
Pos	No.	Driver	Team	Engine	2	10	(Spain) Álex Palou	Chip Ganassi Racing	Honda
3	12	(Australia) Will Power W	Team Penske	Chevrolet					
4	5	(Mexico) Pato O'Ward	Arrow McLaren SP	Chevrolet					
5	60	(United Kingdom) Jack Harvey	Meyer Shank Racing	Honda					
6	2	(United States) Josef Newgarden W	Team Penske	Chevrolet					
7	3	(New Zealand) Scott McLaughlin R	Team Penske	Chevrolet					
8	22	(France) Simon Pagenaud	Team Penske	Chevrolet					
9	15	(United States) Graham Rahal W	Rahal Letterman Lanigan Racing	Honda					
10	26	(United States) Colton Herta	Andretti Autosport	Honda					
11	30	(Japan) Takuma Sato W	Rahal Letterman Lanigan Racing	Honda					
12	21	(Netherlands) Rinus VeeKay	Ed Carpenter Racing	Chevrolet					
13	8	(Sweden) Marcus Ericsson	Chip Ganassi Racing	Honda					
14	14	(France) Sébastien Bourdais	A. J. Foyt Enterprises	Chevrolet					
15	27	(United States) Alexander Rossi	Andretti Autosport	Honda					
16	51	(Brazil) Pietro Fittipaldi	Dale Coyne Racing with Rick Ware Racing	Honda					
17	7	(Sweden) Felix Rosenqvist	Arrow McLaren SP	Chevrolet					
18	18	(United Arab Emirates) Ed Jones	Dale Coyne Racing with Vasser-Sullivan	Honda					
19	20	(United States) Ed Carpenter W	Ed Carpenter Racing	Chevrolet					
20	48	(Brazil) Tony Kanaan W	Chip Ganassi Racing	Honda					
21	28	(United States) Ryan Hunter-Reay	Andretti Autosport	Honda					
22	29	(Canada) James Hinchcliffe	Andretti Steinbrenner Autosport	Honda					
23	4	(Canada) Dalton Kellett	A. J. Foyt Enterprises	Chevrolet					
24	59	(United States) Conor Daly	Carlin	Chevrolet					

== Race ==
=== Race classification ===
Pos	No.	Driver	Team	Engine	Laps	Time/Retired	Pit Stops	Grid	Laps Led	Pts.
1	5	(Mexico) Pato O'Ward	Arrow McLaren SP	Chevrolet	248	02:06:31.12	3	4	25	51
2	2	(United States) Josef Newgarden W	Team Penske	Chevrolet	248	+01.2443	3	6	25	41
3	15	(United States) Graham Rahal W	Rahal Letterman Lanigan Racing	Honda	248	+5.6449	3	9	13	36
4	9	(New Zealand) Scott Dixon W	Chip Ganassi Racing	Honda	248	+6.0386	3	1	163	35
5	26	(United States) Colton Herta	Andretti Autosport	Honda	248	+6.3782	3	10		30
6	22	(France) Simon Pagenaud	Team Penske	Chevrolet	248	+7.0088	3	8		28
7	10	(Spain) Álex Palou	Chip Ganassi Racing	Honda	248	+8.3686	3	2	3	27
8	3	(New Zealand) Scott McLaughlin R	Team Penske	Chevrolet	248	+9.5898	3	7		24
9	21	(Netherlands) Rinus VeeKay	Ed Carpenter Racing	Chevrolet	248	+12.7212	4	12	5	23
10	28	(United States) Ryan Hunter-Reay	Andretti Autosport	Honda	248	+14.5929	4	21		20
11	20	(United States) Ed Carpenter W	Ed Carpenter Racing	Chevrolet	248	+15.3180	3	19	1	20
12	8	(Sweden) Marcus Ericsson	Chip Ganassi Racing	Honda	248	+ 16.0741	13	19		18
13	12	(Australia) Will Power	Team Penske	Chevrolet	248	+17.8136	3	3	1	18
14	30	(Japan) Takuma Sato	Rahal Letterman Lanigan Racing	Honda	247	+1 Lap	4	11	12	17
15	48	(Brazil) Tony Kanaan W	Chip Ganassi Racing	Honda	246	+2 Laps	4	20		15
16	7	(Sweden) Felix Rosenqvist	Arrow McLaren SP	Chevrolet	246	+2 Laps	5	17		14
17	60	(United Kingdom) Jack Harvey	Meyer Shank Racing	Chevrolet	115	Mechanical	1	5		13
18	29	(Canada) James Hinchcliffe	Andretti Steinbrenner Autosport	Honda	30	Mechanical	2	22		12
19	14	(France) Sébastien Bourdais	A. J. Foyt Enterprises	Chevrolet	0	Contact	0	14		11
20	27	(United States) Alexander Rossi	Andretti Autosport	Honda	0	Contact	0	15		10
21	51	(Brazil) Pietro Fittipaldi	Dale Coyne Racing with Rick Ware Racing	Honda	0	Contact	0	16		9
22	18	(United Arab Emirates) Ed Jones	Dale Coyne Racing with Vasser-Sullivan	Honda	0	Contact	0	18		8
23	4	(Canada) Dalton Kellett	A. J. Foyt Enterprises	Chevrolet	0	Contact	0	23		7
24	59	(United States) Conor Daly	Carlin	Chevrolet	0	Contact	0	24		6
Fastest lap: (Spain) Álex Palou (Chip Ganassi Racing) – 00:23.8507 (lap 10)

== Championship standings after the race ==
Drivers' Championship standings

Pos.	Driver	Points
1	(New Zealand) Scott Dixon	153
2	(Mexico) Patricio O'Ward	131
3	(Spain) Álex Palou	127
4	(United States) Josef Newgarden	116
5	(United States) Graham Rahal	107

Engine manufacturer standings

Pos.	Manufacturer	Points
1	Honda	332
2	Chevrolet	318

- Note: Only the top five positions are included.

Previous race: 2021 Genesys 300	IndyCar Series; 2021 season	Next race: 2021 GMR Grand Prix
Previous race: 2021 Genesys 300	XPEL 375	Next race: 2022 XPEL 375
