= 2021 Firestone Grand Prix of St. Petersburg =

Second round of the 2021 IndyCar Series

(United States) 2021 Firestone Grand Prix of St. Petersburg
Race details
2nd round of the 2021 IndyCar season
← Previous race	Next race →
- Date: April 25, 2021
- Official name: Firestone Grand Prix of St. Petersburg
- Location: Streets of St. Petersburg
- Course: Temporary street circuit 1.800 mi / 2.897 km
- Distance: 100 laps 180.000 mi / 289.682 km

Pole position
- Driver: (United States) Colton Herta (Andretti Autosport)
- Time: 01:00.3210

Fastest lap
- Driver: (Spain) Álex Palou (Chip Ganassi Racing)
- Time: 01:01.4568 (on lap 67 of 100)

Podium
- First: (United States) Colton Herta (Andretti Autosport)
- Second: (United States) Josef Newgarden (Team Penske)
- Third: (France) Simon Pagenaud (Team Penske)

Chronology
Previous	Next
2020	2022

The 2021 Firestone Grand Prix of St. Petersburg was the second round of the 2021 IndyCar season. The race was held on April 25, 2021, in St. Petersburg, Florida. The race lasted for 100 laps, and was won by Colton Herta.

== Background ==
The race was originally due to take place on 7 March 2021 as the opening round of the championship, but the COVID-19 pandemic was still a concern for event organisers and IndyCar officials as the 2020 race was postponed from March to October. On January 6, 2021, the race was rescheduled to 25 April 2021 so the event can accommodate more fans with loosening restrictions but it was capped to 20,000 fans to attend.

== Entry list ==
Key	Meaning
R	Rookie
W	Past winner

No.	Driver	Team	Engine
2	(United States) Josef Newgarden W	Team Penske	Chevrolet
3	(New Zealand) Scott McLaughlin R	Team Penske	Chevrolet
4	(Canada) Dalton Kellett	A. J. Foyt Enterprises	Chevrolet
5	(Mexico) Patricio O'Ward	Arrow McLaren SP	Chevrolet
7	(Sweden) Felix Rosenqvist	Arrow McLaren SP	Chevrolet
8	(Sweden) Marcus Ericsson	Chip Ganassi Racing	Honda
9	(New Zealand) Scott Dixon	Chip Ganassi Racing	Honda
10	(Spain) Álex Palou	Chip Ganassi Racing	Honda
12	(Australia) Will Power W	Team Penske	Chevrolet
14	(France) Sébastien Bourdais W	A. J. Foyt Enterprises	Chevrolet
15	(United States) Graham Rahal W	Rahal Letterman Lanigan Racing	Honda
18	(United Arab Emirates) Ed Jones	Dale Coyne Racing with Vasser-Sullivan	Honda
20	(United States) Conor Daly	Ed Carpenter Racing	Chevrolet
21	(Netherlands) Rinus VeeKay	Ed Carpenter Racing	Chevrolet
22	(France) Simon Pagenaud	Team Penske	Chevrolet
26	(United States) Colton Herta	Andretti Autosport	Honda
27	(United States) Alexander Rossi	Andretti Autosport	Honda
28	(United States) Ryan Hunter-Reay	Andretti Autosport	Honda
29	(Canada) James Hinchcliffe W	Andretti Steinbrenner Autosport	Honda
30	(Japan) Takuma Sato	Rahal Letterman Lanigan Racing	Honda
48	(United States) Jimmie Johnson R	Chip Ganassi Racing	Honda
51	(France) Romain Grosjean R	Dale Coyne Racing with Rick Ware Racing	Honda
59	(United Kingdom) Max Chilton	Carlin	Chevrolet
60	(United Kingdom) Jack Harvey	Meyer Shank Racing	Honda

== Practice ==
=== Practice 1 ===
There were 2 red flags during the session, one at the start due to timing and scoring issues, causing the session to be extended by 10 minutes, and another at the end after Sebastien Bourdais spun and stalled his car.

Top Practice Speeds
Pos	No.	Driver	Team	Engine	Lap Time
1	2	(United States) Josef Newgarden	Team Penske	Chevrolet	1:00.8029
2	12	(Australia) Will Power	Team Penske	Chevrolet	1:00.8102
3	26	(United States) Colton Herta	Andretti Autosport	Honda	1:00.8348
OFFICIAL REPORT

=== Practice 2 ===
Top Practice Speeds
Pos	No.	Driver	Team	Engine	Lap Time
1	2	(United States) Josef Newgarden	Team Penske	Chevrolet	1:00.0622
2	27	(United States) Alexander Rossi	Andretti Autosport	Honda	1:00.1749
3	60	(United Kingdom) Jack Harvey	Meyer Shank Racing	Honda	1:00.2192
OFFICIAL REPORT

== Qualifying ==
=== Qualifying classification ===
The field was split into two groups of twelve drivers, with the top 6 of each group progressing to the Fast 12. The top 6 of the Fast 12 proceeded to the Firestone Fast 6.

Pos	No.	Driver	Team	Engine	Time				Final grid
Pos	No.	Driver	Team	Engine	Round 1		Round 2	Round 3	Final grid
Pos	No.	Driver	Team	Engine	Group 1	Group 2	Round 2	Round 3	Final grid
1	26	(United States) Colton Herta	Andretti Autosport	Honda	01:00.3659	N/A	**01:00.2207**	**01:00.3210**	1
2	60	(United Kingdom) Jack Harvey	Meyer Shank Racing	Honda	N/A	01:00.5028	01:00.4262	01:00.5709	2
3	2	(United States) Josef Newgarden **W**	Team Penske	Chevrolet	N/A	**01:00.4437**	01:00.3428	01:00.6078	3
4	22	(France) Simon Pagenaud	Team Penske	Chevrolet	01:00.6375	N/A	01:00.4385	01:00.6353	4
5	14	(France) Sébastien Bourdais **W**	A. J. Foyt Enterprises	Chevrolet	01:00.7182	N/A	01:00.3573	01:01.0017	5
6	5	(Mexico) Patricio O'Ward	Arrow McLaren SP	Chevrolet	01:00.6026	N/A	01:00.3999	01:01.0799	6
7	21	(Netherlands) Rinus VeeKay	Ed Carpenter Racing	Chevrolet	N/A	01:00.5414	01:00.4858	N/A	7
8	9	(New Zealand) Scott Dixon	Chip Ganassi Racing	Honda	01:00.7921	N/A	01:00.4997	N/A	8
9	15	(United States) Graham Rahal **W**	Rahal Letterman Lanigan Racing	Honda	N/A	01:00.4825	01:00.5678	N/A	9
10	10	(Spain) Álex Palou	Chip Ganassi Racing	Honda	N/A	01:00.6521	01:00.6220	N/A	10
11	27	(United States) Alexander Rossi	Andretti Autosport	Honda	**01:00.2949**	N/A	01:00.6476	N/A	11
12	29	(Canada) James Hinchcliffe **W**	Andretti Steinbrenner Autosport	Honda	N/A	01:00.6368	01:00.8671	N/A	12
13	28	(United States) Ryan Hunter-Reay	Andretti Autosport	Honda	01:00.8524	N/A	N/A	N/A	13
14	3	(New Zealand) Scott McLaughlin **R**	Team Penske	Chevrolet	N/A	01:00.7044	N/A	N/A	14
15	30	(Japan) Takuma Sato	Rahal Letterman Lanigan Racing	Honda	01:00.9167	N/A	N/A	N/A	15
16	8	(Sweden) Marcus Ericsson	Chip Ganassi Racing	Honda	N/A	01:00.7058	N/A	N/A	16
17	7	(Sweden) Felix Rosenqvist	Arrow McLaren SP	Chevrolet	01:00.9569	N/A	N/A	N/A	17
18	51	(France) Romain Grosjean **R**	Dale Coyne Racing with Rick Ware Racing	Honda	N/A	01:00.8127	N/A	N/A	18
19	20	(United States) Conor Daly	Ed Carpenter Racing	Chevrolet	01:01.4220	N/A	N/A	N/A	19
20	12	(Australia) Will Power **W**	Team Penske	Chevrolet	N/A	01:01.1140	N/A	N/A	20
21	18	(United Arab Emirates) Ed Jones	Dale Coyne Racing with Vasser-Sullivan	Honda	01:01.4453	N/A	N/A	N/A	21
22	59	(United Kingdom) Max Chilton	Carlin	Chevrolet	N/A	01:01.5065	N/A	N/A	22
23	48	(United States) Jimmie Johnson **R**	Chip Ganassi Racing	Honda	01:01.8364	N/A	N/A	N/A	23
24	4	(Canada) Dalton Kellett	A. J. Foyt Enterprises	Chevrolet	N/A	01:02.3396	N/A	N/A	24

Notes

- **Bold text** indicates fastest time set in session.

== Warmup ==
=== Warmup ===
Top Practice Speeds
Pos	No.	Driver	Team	Engine	Lap Time
1	26	(United States) Colton Herta	Andretti Autosport	Honda	01:00.6632
2	30	(Japan) Takuma Sato	Rahal Letterman Lanigan Racing	Honda	01:00.6768
3	9	(New Zealand) Scott Dixon	Chip Ganassi Racing	Honda	01:00.8092

== Race ==
=== Race classification ===
Pos	No.	Driver	Team	Engine	Laps	Time/Retired	Pit Stops	Grid	Laps Led	Pts.
1	26	(United States) Colton Herta	Andretti Autosport	Honda	100	1:51:51.4115	2	1	97	54
2	2	(United States) Josef Newgarden W	Team Penske	Chevrolet	100	+2.4933	2	3		40
3	22	(France) Simon Pagenaud	Team Penske	Chevrolet	100	+6.1496	2	4	1	36
4	60	(United Kingdom) Jack Harvey	Meyer Shank Racing	Honda	100	+8.0833	2	2		32
5	9	(New Zealand) Scott Dixon	Chip Ganassi Racing	Honda	100	+8.9497	2	8		30
6	30	(Japan) Takuma Sato	Rahal Letterman Lanigan Racing	Honda	100	+11.6802	2	15		28
7	8	(Sweden) Marcus Ericsson	Chip Ganassi Racing	Honda	100	+11.9393	2	16		26
8	12	(Australia) Will Power W	Team Penske	Chevrolet	100	+13.2363	3	20		24
9	21	(Netherlands) Rinus VeeKay	Ed Carpenter Racing	Chevrolet	100	+13.7194	2	7		22
10	14	(France) Sébastien Bourdais W	A. J. Foyt Enterprises	Chevrolet	100	+15.9951	2	5		20
11	3	(New Zealand) Scott McLaughlin R	Team Penske	Chevrolet	100	+17.5926	3	14		19
12	7	(Sweden) Felix Rosenqvist	Arrow McLaren SP	Chevrolet	100	+18.5638	3	17		18
13	51	(France) Romain Grosjean R	Dale Coyne Racing with Rick Ware Racing	Honda	100	+22.7276	3	18		17
14	28	(United States) Ryan Hunter-Reay	Andretti Autosport	Honda	100	+24.1275	3	13		16
15	15	(United States) Graham Rahal W	Rahal Letterman Lanigan Racing	Honda	100	+24.7928	3	9		15
16	20	(United States) Conor Daly	Ed Carpenter Racing	Chevrolet	100	+48.1603	5	19		14
17	10	(Spain) Álex Palou	Chip Ganassi Racing	Honda	99	+1 Lap	2	10	2	14
18	29	(Canada) James Hinchcliffe W	Andretti Steinbrenner Autosport	Honda	99	+1 Lap	3	12		12
19	5	(Mexico) Patricio O'Ward	Arrow McLaren SP	Chevrolet	99	+1 Lap	3	6		11
20	18	(United Arab Emirates) Ed Jones	Dale Coyne Racing with Vasser-Sullivan	Honda	99	+1 Lap	5	21		10
21	27	(United States) Alexander Rossi	Andretti Autosport	Honda	98	+2 Laps	3	11		9
22	48	(United States) Jimmie Johnson R	Chip Ganassi Racing	Honda	95	+5 Laps	3	23		8
23	4	(Canada) Dalton Kellett	A. J. Foyt Enterprises	Chevrolet	67	Off Course	2	23		7
24	59	(United Kingdom) Max Chilton	Carlin	Chevrolet	18	Mechanical	1	22		6
Fastest lap: (Spain) Álex Palou (Chip Ganassi Racing) – 01:01.4568 (lap 67)

== Championship standings after the race ==
Drivers' Championship standings

Pos.	Driver	Points
1	(Spain) Álex Palou	67
2	(Australia) Will Power	65
3	(New Zealand) Scott Dixon	65
4	(United States) Colton Herta	62
5	(France) Simon Pagenaud	54

Engine manufacturer standings

Pos.	Manufacturer	Points
1	Honda	178
2	Chevrolet	148

- Note: Only the top five positions are included.

Previous race: 2021 Honda Indy Grand Prix of Alabama	IndyCar Series; 2021 season	Next race: 2021 Genesys 300
Previous race: 2020 Firestone Grand Prix of St. Petersburg	Grand Prix of St. Petersburg	Next race: 2022 Firestone Grand Prix of St. Petersburg
