= Meyer Shank Racing =

American auto racing team

(United States) Meyer Shank Racing
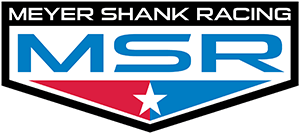
- Owner(s): Michael Shank; Jim Meyer; Liberty Media; Helio Castroneves
- Principal(s): Michael Shank
- Base: Pataskala, Ohio
- Series: IndyCar Series; IMSA SportsCar Championship
- Race drivers: IndyCar Series: 06. (Brazil) Helio Castroneves (part-time); 60. (New Zealand) Marcus Armstrong; 66. (Germany) Mick Schumacher
- Manufacturer: IndyCar Series: Honda

Career
- Drivers' Championships: IMSA SportsCar Championship: 2019, 2020, 2022
- Indy 500 victories: 2 (2021, 2026)

Meyer Shank Racing (MSR; formerly Michael Shank Racing) is an American motorsport organization that competes in the IndyCar Series and the IMSA SportsCar Championship.

== History ==
=== Atlantic Championship ===
Michael Shank, co-owner of Meyer Shank Racing (MSR), was originally a car owner for Sam Hornish Jr. He started racing in 1989, winning SCCA Ohio Valley Region's Novice Driver of the Year. He later on debuted his racing career in the mid-1990s, winning the 1996 Player's/Toyota Atlantic C2 championship. Shank raced in his one and only Indy Racing League in 1997 with Nienhouse Motorsports. By 1999 Shank had won the Formula Atlantic series Rookie of the Year title. Shank has since been twice named Formula Atlantic Team Owner of the Year.

=== Grand-Am ===
Michael Shank joined the Grand-Am Rolex Series in 2004, the second year of the Daytona Prototype class. He entered a Lexus-powered Doran JE4 in 12 races with primary drivers Ozz Negri and Burt Frisselle, finishing second at Watkins Glen's short course and third at Homestead-Miami Speedway. The team owner took a giant step in 2005. Orlando transportation magnate Paul Mears Jr. partnered with Shank to run his Pontiac Riley. Impressed with the new car, Shank purchased a Riley of his own, with Negri capturing the pole for the car's first race at Laguna Seca to immediately demonstrate its potential. Negri and Mark Patterson completed the season, with a best finish of third at Watkins Glen, while Mears and Mike Borkowski earned podiums at California Speedway and Barber Motorsports Park.

MSR posted its first victory in 2006, with Negri and Patterson winning the finale at Salt Lake City. John Pew joined the team midway through the 2007 campaign, and became the regular driver in the No. 6 Lexus Riley with Ian James, with Patterson and Negri in the No. 60.

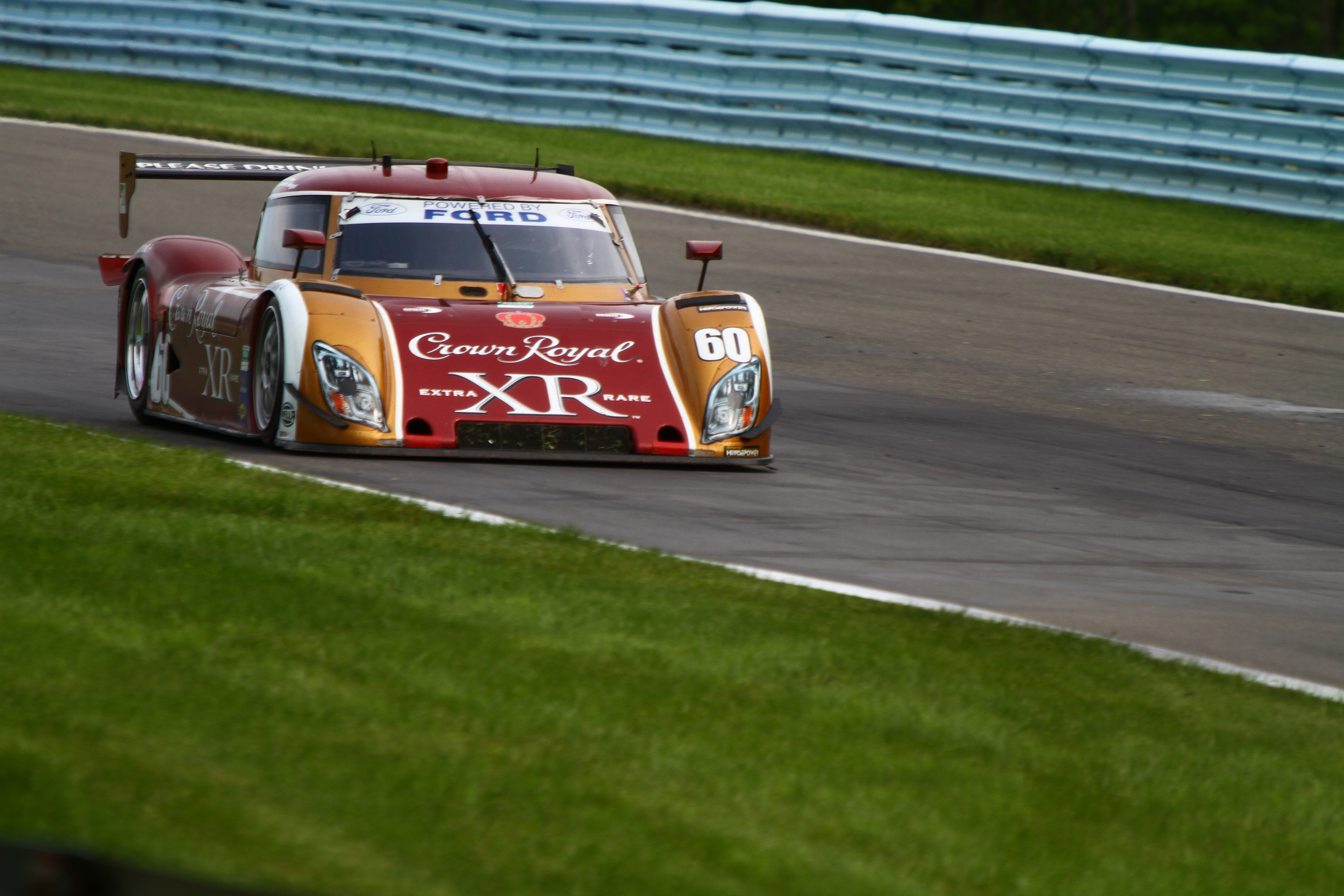
The Meyer Shank Racing Riley-Ford Daytona Prototype seen at Watkins Glen International in 2011

Shank was the first team owner to step up to the second generation DP in 2008, upgrading both of his cars to Ford-powered Rileys—with Negri validating his move by winning the pole for that year's Rolex 24 at Daytona. Negri and Patterson won the inaugural race at New Jersey Motorsports Park in the No. 60, while Pew, Ian James and Rafa Matos won the finale at Utah's Miller Motorsports Park.

After showing continued improvement throughout the upcoming campaigns, MSR was recognized as a premier team in 2012. With Grand-Am upgrading to the third-generation DP, Shank purchased a pair of Ford-powered Rileys. The team made its first race a major achievement, taking the overall victory in the heralded 50th running of the Rolex 24 At Daytona. Justin Wilson and AJ Allmendinger joined Pew and Negri. Shank recorded another milestone in 2013, when Colin Braun drove his DP to a pair of FIA-sanctioned world records in the 10 kilometers and 10 miles at Daytona International Speedway. Braun also shattered the track record with a lap of 222.971 mph, breaking Bill Elliott's 26-year-old mark of 210.364 mph.

=== IMSA WeatherTech SportsCar Championship ===
In 2014 Grand-Am and the American Le Mans Series merged to form the United SportsCar Championship. Meyer Shank Racing ran a single Riley Ford Ecoboost DP with drivers John Pew and Oswaldo Negri in the new series. In 2015 and 2016 the team replaced the current car with a Ligier JS P2-HPD keeping Pew and Negri behind the wheel. In 2016 the team claimed wins at Laguna Seca and Petit Le Mans with Ozz Negri and John Pew behind the wheel at both tracks. Operating for the past two seasons as a customer team fielding a Honda-powered Ligier chassis in IMSA's prototype division, Michael Shank Racing has been a consistent front-runner in the headline category of the WeatherTech SportsCar Championship. The Columbus, Ohio-based operation will run a pair of Acura NSX GT3s in the GTD class of the endurance racing series.

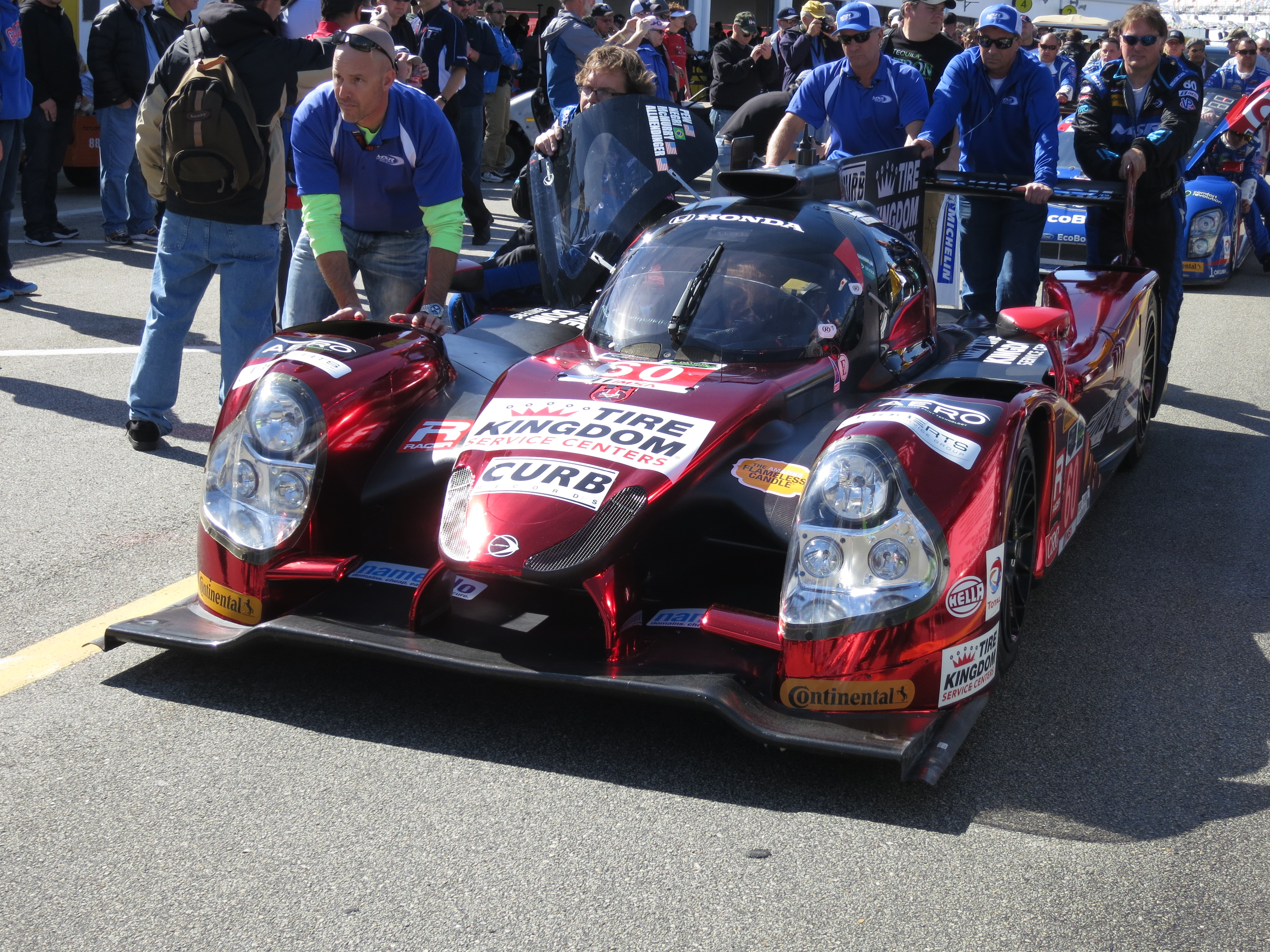
The Meyer Shank Racing Ligier JS P2-Honda Le Mans Prototype seen at the 2015 Rolex 24 at Daytona

The team switched to the GT Daytona (GTD) class in 2017 and entered two factory-backed Acura NSX GT3s with drivers Oswaldo Negri Jr, Jeff Segal, Andy Lally and Katherine Legge. That season the team saw two wins, Belle Isle and Watkins Glen. The following season, 2018, Meyer Shank Racing saw another win at Belle Isle and a win at Laguna Seca which left the team finishing second overall in the United SportsCar Championship. The team also introduced new drivers Mario Farnbacher, Trent Hindman, and Justin Marks.

The 2019 season brought one win at Watkins Glen and four second place finishes throughout the year. Farnbacher, Hindman, and Marks won the GT Daytona (GTD) group title in 2019. The 2020 season brought more new drivers Matt McMurry and Shinya Michimi. As well as the team's first win at Road Atlanta and the second win at Laguna Seca. Hélio Castroneves was introduced to the Meyer Shank Racing team at the end of the 2021 season, racing in the Petit Le Mans. The following year, 2022, was a big season for Meyer Shank Racing as the team saw their first victory at the Rolex 24 in Daytona with drivers Oliver Jarvis, Tom Blomqvist, Hélio Castroneves, and Simon Pagenaud. The 2022 season also brought home a huge win with the team taking first place for the WeatherTech Championship.

The Rolex 2023 24 Hours of Daytona saw the MSR team bring home their second victory at Daytona, with their LMDh GTP hypercar racing prototype, under drivers Helio Castroneves, Colin Braun, Simon Pagenaud, Tom Blomqvist. However, after the race, the team and drivers were penalized all the points and prize money, due to infringement on the rules concerning tire pressure. The tire pressure data had been manipulated, leading to a $50,000 team fine, and the expulsion of the race engineer Ryan McCarthy the season and team, and probation for the team. The team and drivers kept the win, but without any Michelin Endurance points and reduced championship points.

After the 2023 IMSA Sports Car Championship season, MSR would not return for 2024. In 2025, MSR is returning to the IMSA WeatherTech SportsCar Championship in the GTP category, with both the 60 and the 93 GTP cars making an appearance for the season opener 2025 24 Hours of Daytona. The 60 will be piloted by Tom Blomqvist, and Colin Braun. The 93 will be piloted by Renger van der Zande, and Nick Yelloly. The team will be fielding two Acura lmdh powertrains. After the conclusion of the 2026 IMSA Sports Car Championship, MSR will not return for the 2027 IMSA Sports Car Championship.

=== IndyCar ===
The team purchased a 2012 Dallara IndyCar, with the goal of adding a full-time IndyCar program in 2012 while continuing its Grand-Am programs. The original intention for the IndyCar program was to run under the name "MSR Indy", with A. J. Allmendinger and Brian Bailey as co-owners. The program was intended to use the Lotus engines (later revealed to be uncompetitive) and field Jay Howard for the 2012 Indianapolis 500; however, despite having full sponsorship from Jim Beam, the failure to secure a competitive engine lease kept it from doing so.

MSR announced that it had sold its Dallara chassis to Sam Schmidt Motorsports in February 2013 and declared its intention to collaborate with another team on a 2013 Indianapolis 500 entry. No such program was finalized in time for the race. For the 2017 Indianapolis 500, the team partnered with Andretti Autosport for an entry driven by Jack Harvey.

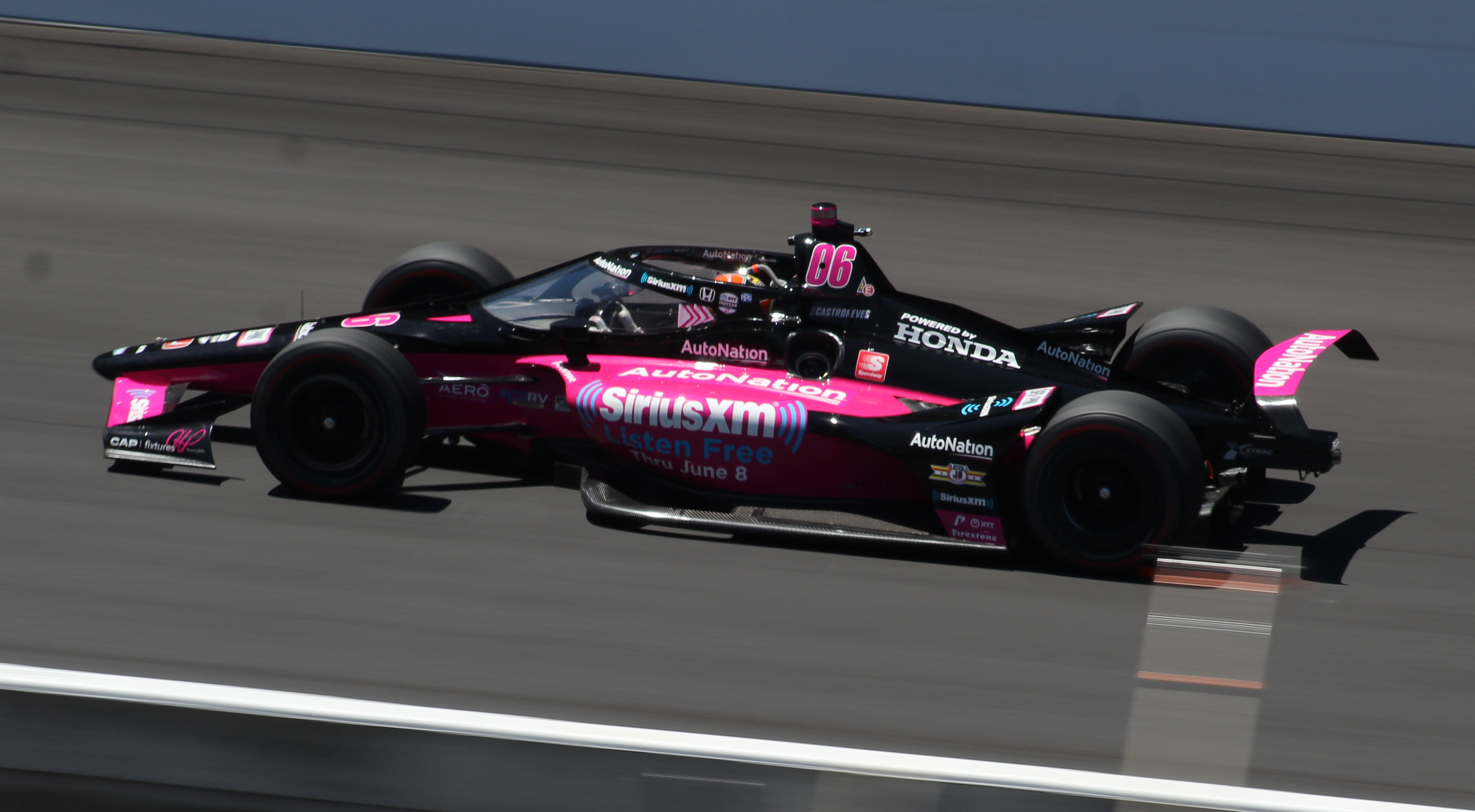
The No. 06 Meyer Shank Racing Dallara DW12-Honda of Hélio Castroneves at the 2021 Indianapolis 500

In the 2018 IndyCar Series, in a partnership with Schmidt Peterson Motorsports, the team entered Jack Harvey in 6 events, including the 2018 Indianapolis 500, and in 2019 in 10 races, obtaining the first podium, the 3rd place in the IndyCar Grand Prix.

On October 2, 2020, it was announced that Liberty Media's Formula One Group was making a minority equity investment in the team.

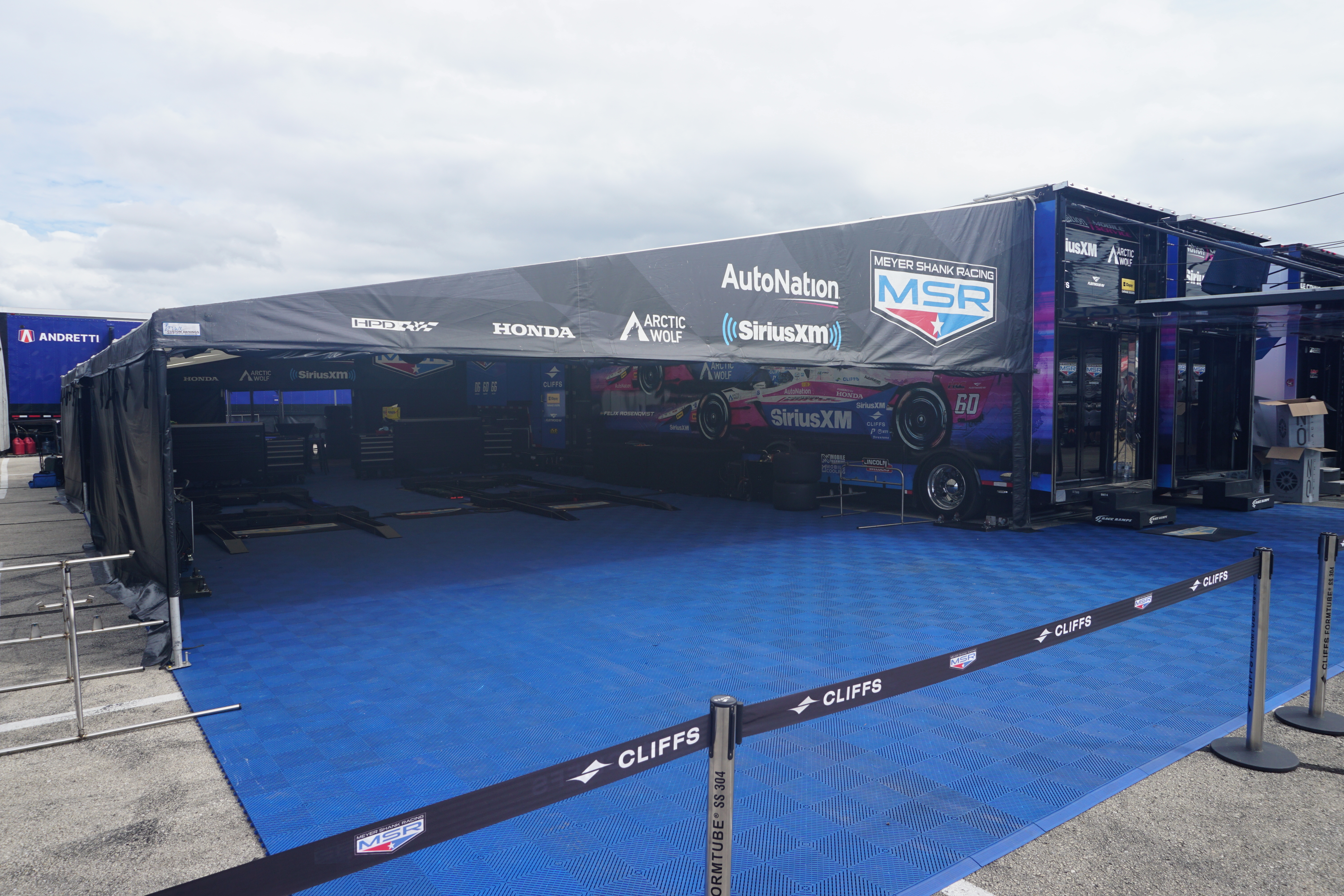
Meyer Shank Racing garage at the 2024 Hy-Vee Milwaukee Mile 250s

On May 30, 2021, Hélio Castroneves won the 2021 Indy 500 with the team. This marked Castroneves' 4th Indy 500 victory (tied for most all time), and the team's first career victory in the IndyCar Series. Hélio Castroneves and Simon Pagenaud competed for Meyer Shank in 2022 and will continue racing with the team for the 2023 season.

On May 24, 2026, Felix Rosenqvist won the 2026 Indianapolis 500, marking the second win for Meyer Shank.

== Team ownership ==
In 2023, Helio Castroneves became a minority stake owner of Meyer Shank Racing. Castroneves continues to focus on selected IndyCar and endurance racing appearances with the team while balancing his ownership responsibilities.

== Racing results ==
=== IndyCar Series ===
(key)

Year	Chassis	Engine	Drivers	No.	1	2	3	4	5	6	7	8	9	10	11	12	13	14	15	16	17	18	Pos.	Pts.
Michael Shank Racing with Andretti Autosport
2017					STP	LBH	ALA	PHX	IMS	INDY	DET		TXS	ROA	IOW	TOR	MDO	POC	GAT	WGL	SNM			
2017	Dallara DW12	Honda HI17TT V6t	(United Kingdom) Jack Harvey R	50						31													28th	57
Meyer Shank Racing with Schmidt Peterson Motorsports
2018					STP	PHX	LBH	ALA	IMS	INDY	DET		TXS	ROA	IOW	TOR	MDO	POC	GAT	POR	SNM			
2018	Dallara DW12	Honda HI18TT V6t	(United Kingdom) Jack Harvey R	60	23		12			16							20			16	17		24th	103
Meyer Shank Racing with Arrow Schmidt Peterson Motorsports
2019					STP	COA	ALA	LBH	IMS	INDY	DET		TXS	ROA	TOR	IOW	MDO	POC	GAT	POR	LAG			
2019	Dallara DW12	Honda HI19TT V6t	(United Kingdom) Jack Harvey	60	10	10	13	22	3	21				15			10			19	19		21st	186
Meyer Shank Racing
2020					TXS	IMS	ROA		IOW		INDY	GAT		MDO		IMS		STP						
2020	Dallara DW12	Honda HI20TT V6t	(United Kingdom) Jack Harvey	60	16	17	23	17	7	7	9	11	13	7	12	8	6	19					15th	288
2021					ALA	STP	TXS		IMS	INDY	DET		ROA	MDO	NSH	IMS	GAT	POR	LAG	LBH				
2021	Dallara DW12	Honda HI21TT V6t	(Brazil) Hélio Castroneves	06						1^{8L}					9	21		23	24	20			22nd	158
2021	Dallara DW12	Honda HI21TT V6t	(United Kingdom) Jack Harvey	60	11	4	7	17	23	18	16	19	17	19	15	6	10	4	15	7			13th	308
2022					STP	TXS	LBH	ALA	IMS	INDY	DET	ROA	MDO	TOR	IOW		IMS	NSH	GAT	POR	LAG			
2022	Dallara DW12	Honda HI22TT V6t	(Brazil) Hélio Castroneves	06	14	23^{L}	9	21	14	7	25	22	8	17	16	21	19	13	15	17	19		18th	263
2022	Dallara DW12	Honda HI22TT V6t	(France) Simon Pagenaud	60	15	8	19	11	2	8	9	12	10	7	23	23	25	9	20	23	17		15th	314
2023					STP	TXS	LBH	ALA	IMS	INDY	DET	ROA	MDO	TOR	IOW		NSH	IMS	GAT	POR	LAG			
2023	Dallara DW12	Honda HI23TT V6t	(Brazil) Hélio Castroneves	06	23	10	21	21	22	15	19	15	21	21	14	16	11	15	23	14	13		18th	217
2023	Dallara DW12	Honda HI23TT V6t	(France) Simon Pagenaud	60	26	17	15	18	25	25	13	14	Wth										28th	88
2023	Dallara DW12	Honda HI23TT V6t	(United States) Conor Daly	60									20		21	17							25th	134
2023	Dallara DW12	Honda HI23TT V6t	(United Kingdom) Tom Blomqvist R	60										25						24	26		34th	16
2023	Dallara DW12	Honda HI23TT V6t	(Sweden) Linus Lundqvist R	60													25	12	18				31st	35
2024					STP	THE^{1}	LBH	ALA	IMS	INDY	DET	ROA	LAG	MDO	IOW		TOR	GAT	POR	MIL		NSH		
2024	Dallara DW12	Honda HI24TT V6t	(Sweden) Felix Rosenqvist	60	5	3	9	4	10	27	8	14	11	14	13	26	23	6	14	13	11	27	12th	306
2024	Dallara DW12	Honda HI24TT V6t	(Brazil) Hélio Castroneves	06						20													35th	26
2024	Dallara DW12	Honda HI24TT V6t	(Brazil) Hélio Castroneves	66							25	19											35th	26
2024	Dallara DW12	Honda HI24TT V6t	(United Kingdom) Tom Blomqvist R	66	15	DNQ	22	19	23	31													30th	46
2024	Dallara DW12	Honda HI24TT V6t	(United States) David Malukas	66									16	12	26	13	6	21	20	15	22	9	24th	148
2025					STP	THE	LBH	ALA	IMS	INDY	DET	GAT	ROA	MDO	IOW		TOR	LAG	POR	MIL	NSH			
2025	Dallara DW12	Honda HI25TT V6t	(Brazil) Hélio Castroneves	06						10													29th	20
2025	Dallara DW12	Honda HI25TT V6t	(Sweden) Felix Rosenqvist	60	7	5	4	13	10	4	21	16	2	6	17	7	19	24	9	22	7		6th	372
2025	Dallara DW12	Honda HI25TT V6t	(New Zealand) Marcus Armstrong	66	24	7	14	17	7	18	6	9	5	7	9	3	14	8	8	10	19		8th	364
2026					STP	PHX	ARL	ALA	LBH	IMS	INDY	DET	GAT	ROA	MOH	NSH	POR	MAR	D.C.	MIL		LAG		
2026	Dallara DW12	Honda HI26TT V6t	(Brazil) Hélio Castroneves	06							25												30th	5
2026	Dallara DW12	Honda HI26TT V6t	(Sweden) Felix Rosenqvist	60	12	12	19	13	2*	23	1	6	14	8*	13	5	2	24	19	17	20	4	9th	412
2026	Dallara DW12	Honda HI26TT V6t	(New Zealand) Marcus Armstrong	66	11	5	10	6	24	11	5	11	9	24	14	24	25	16	17	9	16	7	14th	320

* Season still in progress

1. Non-points-paying, exhibition race.

=== IMSA SportsCar Championship ===
==== Prototype ====
Year	Chassis	Engine	Full-time drivers	No.	1	2	3	4	5	6	7	8	9	10	11	Pos.	Pts.
Michael Shank Racing
2014					DAY	SEB	LBH	LAG	DET	WGI	MOS	IMS	ROA	COTA	ATL		
2014	Ford EcoBoost Riley DP	Ford EcoBoost 3.5L V6 Turbo	(Brazil) Oswaldo Negri Jr. (United States) John Pew	60	12	9	9	10	4	7	5	6	2	5	6	6th	281
Michael Shank Racing with Curb/Agajanian
2015					DAY	SEB	LBH	LAG	DET	WGI	MOS	ROA	COTA	ATL			
2015	Ligier JS P2	Honda HR28TT 2.8L V6 Turbo	(Brazil) Oswaldo Negri Jr. (United States) John Pew	60	5	13	6	3	2	7	3	4	4	9		6th	273
2016					DAY	SEB	LBH	LAG	DET	WGI	MOS	ROA	COTA	ATL			
2016	Ligier JS P2	Honda HR35TT 3.5L V6 Turbo	(Brazil) Oswaldo Negri Jr. (United States) John Pew (9 races) (France) Olivier Pla (4 races)	60	11	7	7	1	5	3	6	4	6	1		4th	282
Meyer Shank Racing with Curb/Agajanian
2021					DAY	SEB	MDO	DET	WGI	WGI	ROA	LAG	LBH	ATL			
2021	Acura ARX-05	Acura AR35TT 3.5 L Turbo V6	(United States) Dane Cameron (France) Olivier Pla (9 races)	60	4	3	6	6	2	6	5	4	6	6		5th	2946
2022					DAY	SEB	LBH	LAG	MOH	DET	WGI	MOS	ROA	ATL			
2022	Acura ARX-05	Acura AR35TT 3.5 L Turbo V6	(United Kingdom) Tom Blomqvist (United Kingdom) Oliver Jarvis	60	1	5	4	2	2	2	2	2	4	1		1st	3432
2023					DAY	SEB	LBH	LAG	WGI	MOS	ROA	IMS	ATL				
2023	Acura ARX-06	Acura AR24e 2.4 L Turbo V6	(United Kingdom) Tom Blomqvist (United States) Colin Braun	60	1	6	6	6	3	1	2	6	1			3rd	2711
2025					DAY	SEB	LBH	LGA	DET	WGL	ELK	IMS	ATL				
2025	Acura ARX-06	Acura AR24e 2.4 L Turbo V6	(United Kingdom) Tom Blomqvist (United States) Colin Braun	60	2	10	9	11	6	1	7	3	5			7th	2602
2025	Acura ARX-06	Acura AR24e 2.4 L Turbo V6	(United Kingdom) Nick Yelloly (Netherlands) Renger van der Zande	93	8	3	11	5	1	6	3	5	7			5th	2657
2026*					DAY	SEB	LBH	LGA	DET	WGL	ELK	IMS	ATL				
2026*	Acura ARX-06	Acura AR24e 2.4 L Turbo V6	(United Kingdom) Tom Blomqvist (United States) Colin Braun	60	9	4	7	4	7	10						7th	1633
2026*	Acura ARX-06	Acura AR24e 2.4 L Turbo V6	(United Kingdom) Nick Yelloly (Netherlands) Renger van der Zande	93	5	6	1	5	4	3						2nd	1900

* Season still in progress

==== GT Daytona ====
Year	Chassis	Engine	Drivers	No.	1	2	3	4	5	6	7	8	9	10	11	12	Pos.	Pts.
Michael Shank Racing with Curb/Agajanian
2017					DAY	SEB	LBH	COTA	DET	WGI	MOS	LIM	ROA	VIR	LGA	ATL		
2017	Acura NSX GT3	Acura 3.5L V6 Turbo	(Brazil) Oswaldo Negri Jr. (United States) Jeff Segal	86	5	8	10	11	5	16	10	9	14	14	10	12	13th	248
2017	Acura NSX GT3	Acura 3.5L V6 Turbo	(United States) Andy Lally (United Kingdom) Katherine Legge	93	11	14	7	15	1	1	2	5	15	15	2	14	6th	286
2017	Meyer Shank Racing with Curb/Agajanian																	
2018					DAY	SEB	MOH	DET	WGI	MOS	LIM	ROA	VIR	LGA	ATL			
2018	Acura NSX GT3	Acura 3.5L Turbo V6	(United Kingdom) Katherine Legge (Portugal) Álvaro Parente (9 races)	86	2	8	2	1	2	5	4	7	3	1	2		2nd	329
2018	Acura NSX GT3	Acura 3.5L Turbo V6	(United States) Lawson Aschenbach (United States) Justin Marks	93	11	7	5	2	14	6	9	8	9	13	12		9th	249
2019					DAY	SEB	MOH	DET	WGI	MOS	LIM	ROA	VIR	LGA	ATL			
2019	Acura NSX GT3	Acura 3.5L Turbo V6	Heinricher Racing with Meyer Shank Racing															
2019	Acura NSX GT3	Acura 3.5L Turbo V6	(United Kingdom) Katherine Legge	57	12	8	10	9	4	6	12	13	12	6	7		9th	221
2019	Acura NSX GT3	Acura 3.5L Turbo V6	Meyer Shank Racing with Curb/Agajanian															
2019	Acura NSX GT3	Acura 3.5L Turbo V6	(Germany) Mario Farnbacher (United States) Trent Hindman	86	4	7	2	11	1	2	2	5	2	8	12		1st	283
2020					DAY1	DAY2	SEB1	ROA	VIR	ATL1	MOH	CLT	ATL2	LGA	SEB2			
2020	Acura NSX GT3	Acura 3.5L Turbo V6	Heinricher Racing with MSR Curb/Agajanian															
2020	Acura NSX GT3	Acura 3.5L Turbo V6	(Canada) Mikhail Goikhberg (11 races) (Portugal) Álvaro Parente (10 races)	57	8	4		12	6	7	6	5	6	3	6		7th	250
2020	Acura NSX GT3	Acura 3.5L Turbo V6	Meyer Shank Racing with Curb/Agajanian															
2020	Acura NSX GT3	Acura 3.5L Turbo V6	(Germany) Mario Farnbacher (11 races) (United States) Matt McMurry (11 races)	86	10	3		2	2	1	5	7	10	1	3		1st	288

=== 24 Hours of Le Mans ===
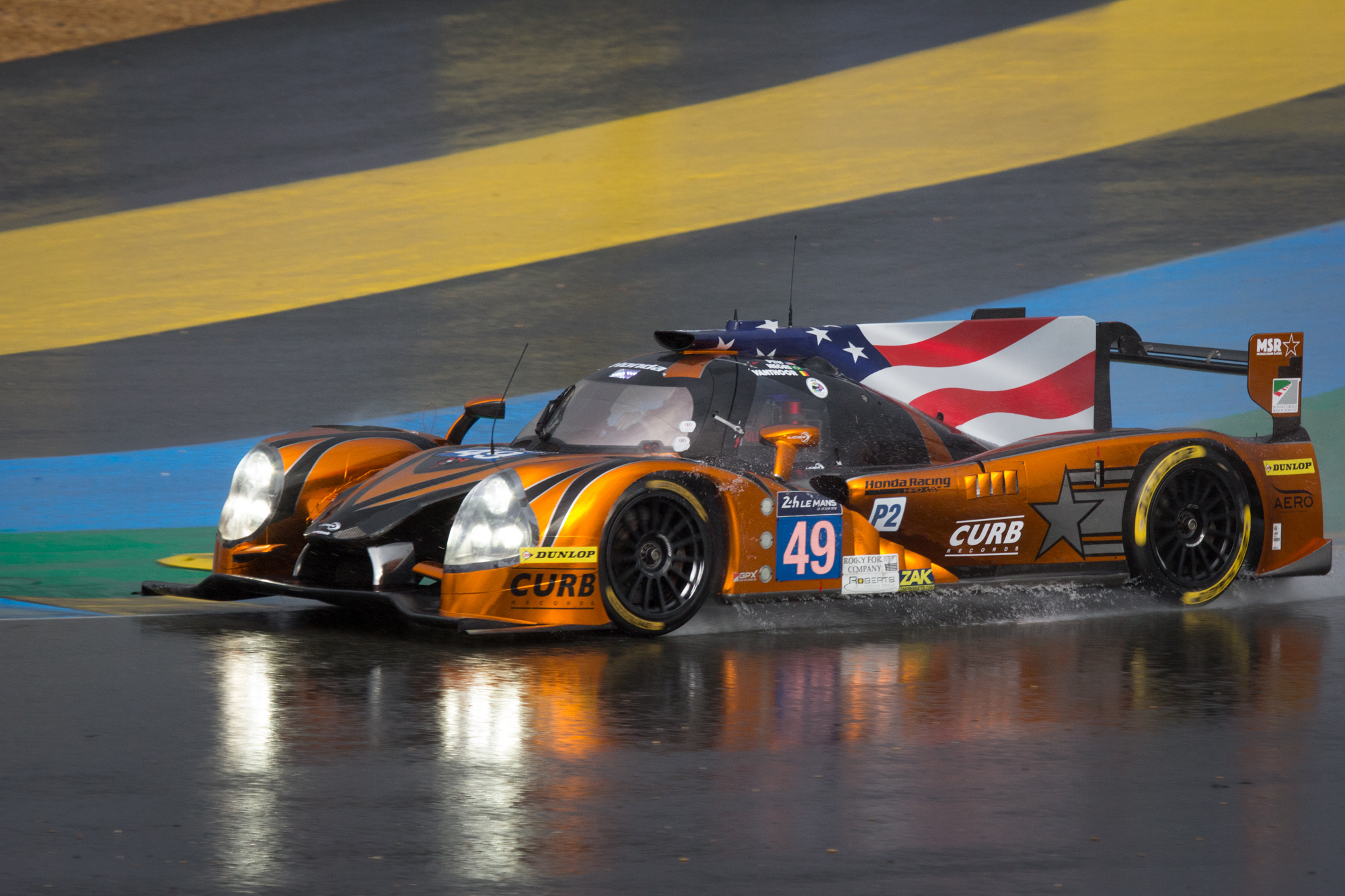
Michael Shank Racing at the 2016 24 Hours of Le Mans.

Year	Entrant	No.	Car	Drivers	Class	Laps	Pos.	Class Pos.
2016	(United States) Michael Shank Racing	49	Ligier JS P2-Honda	(Brazil) Oswaldo Negri Jr. (United States) John Pew (Belgium) Laurens Vanthoor	LMP2	345	14th	9th

== IndyCar wins ==
#	Season	Date	Sanction	Track / Race	No.	Winning driver	Chassis	Engine	Tire	Grid	Laps Led
1	2021	May 30	IndyCar	Indianapolis Motor Speedway (O)	06	(Brazil) Hélio Castroneves	Dallara DW12	Honda HI21TT V6t	Firestone	8	20
2	2026	May 24	IndyCar	Indianapolis Motor Speedway (O)	60	(Sweden) Felix Rosenqvist	Dallara DW12	Honda HI21TT V6t	Firestone	4	25

== WeatherTech SportsCar Championship wins ==
=== Overall ===
#	Season	Date	Classes	Track / Race	No.	Winning drivers	Chassis	Engine
1	2016	May 1	Prototype	Laguna Seca	60	(Brazil) Oswaldo Negri Jr. / (United States) John Pew	Ligier JS P2	Honda HR35TT 3.5 L V6 Turbo
2	2016	October 1	Prototype	Road Atlanta	60	(Brazil) Oswaldo Negri Jr. / (United States) John Pew / (France) Olivier Pla	Ligier JS P2	Honda HR35TT 3.5 L V6 Turbo
3	2022	January 30	DPi	Daytona	60	(Brazil) Helio Castroneves / (France) Simon Pagenaud / (United Kingdom) Tom Blomqvist / (United Kingdom) Oliver Jarvis	Acura ARX-05c	Acura AR35TT 3.5L V6 Twin-Turbo
4	2022	October 1	DPi	Road Atlanta	60	(Brazil) Helio Castroneves / (United Kingdom) Tom Blomqvist / (United Kingdom) Oliver Jarvis	Acura ARX-05c	Acura AR35TT 3.5L V6 Twin-Turbo
5	2023	January 29	GTP	Daytona	60	(Brazil) Helio Castroneves / (France) Simon Pagenaud / (United Kingdom) Tom Blomqvist / (United States) Colin Braun	Acura ARX-06	Acura AR24e 2.4L V6 Twin-Turbo
6	2025	May 31	GTP	Detroit	93	(United Kingdom) Nick Yelloly / (Netherlands) Renger van der Zande	Acura ARX-06	Acura AR24e 2.4L V6 Twin-Turbo
7	2025	June 22	GTP	Watkins Glen	60	(United Kingdom) Tom Blomqvist / (United States) Colin Braun	Acura ARX-06	Acura AR24e 2.4L V6 Twin-Turbo
8	2026	April 19	GTP	Long Beach	93	(Netherlands) Renger van der Zande / (United Kingdom) Nick Yelloly	Acura ARX-06	Acura AR24e 2.4L V6 Twin-Turbo

=== Class ===
#	Season	Date	Classes	Track / Race	No.	Winning drivers	Chassis	Engine
1	2017	June 3	GTD	Belle Isle	93	(United States) Andy Lally / (United Kingdom) Katherine Legge	Acura NSX GT3	Acura 3.5L Turbo V6
2	2017	July 3	GTD	Watkins Glen	93	(United States) Andy Lally / (United Kingdom) Katherine Legge	Acura NSX GT3	Acura 3.5L Turbo V6
3	2018	June 2	GTD	Belle Isle	86	(Germany) Mario Farnbacher / (United Kingdom) Katherine Legge	Acura NSX GT3 Evo	Acura 3.5L Turbo V6
4	2018	September 9	GTD	Laguna Seca	86	(United Kingdom) Katherine Legge / (Portugal) Álvaro Parente	Acura NSX GT3 Evo	Acura 3.5L Turbo V6
5	2019	June 30	GTD	Watkins Glen	86	(Germany) Mario Farnbacher / (United States) Trent Hindman / (United States) Justin Marks	Acura NSX GT3 Evo	Acura 3.5L Turbo V6
6	2020	September 5	GTD	Road Atlanta	86	(Germany) Mario Farnbacher / (United States) Matt McMurry / (Japan) Shinya Michimi	Acura NSX GT3 Evo	Acura 3.5L Turbo V6
7	2020	November 1	GTD	Laguna Seca	86	(Germany) Mario Farnbacher / (United States) Matt McMurry	Acura NSX GT3 Evo	Acura 3.5L Turbo V6
