= 2021 GMR Grand Prix =

5th round of the 2021 IndyCar Series

(United States) 2021 GMR Grand Prix
Race details
5th round of the 2021 IndyCar season
← Previous race	Next race →
- Layout of the Indianapolis Motor Speedway Road Course
- Date: May 15, 2021
- Official name: GMR Grand Prix
- Location: Indianapolis Motor Speedway, Speedway, Indiana
- Course: Permanent racing facility 2.439 mi / 3.925 km
- Distance: 85 laps 207.315 mi / 333.641 km

Pole position
- Driver: (France) Romain Grosjean (Dale Coyne Racing with Rick Ware Racing)
- Time: 01:09.4396

Fastest lap
- Driver: (Netherlands) Rinus Veekay (Ed Carpenter Racing)
- Time: 01:10:8767 (on lap 14 of 85)

Podium
- First: (Netherlands) Rinus Veekay (Ed Carpenter Racing)
- Second: (France) Romain Grosjean (Dale Coyne Racing with Rick Ware Racing)
- Third: (Spain) Alex Palou (Chip Ganassi Racing)

Chronology
Previous	Next
October 2020	August 2021

The 2021 GMR Grand Prix was an IndyCar motor race held on May 15, 2021, at the Indianapolis Motor Speedway Road Course. It was the 5th round of the 2021 IndyCar Series.

The 85-lap race was won by Ed Carpenter Racing's Rinus Veekay, clinching the first win of his Indycar career. IndyCar rookie Romain Grosjean won the pole and finished second, his best ever finish in Indycar. Alex Palou finished 3rd for Chip Ganassi Racing.

== Background ==
The event was held over three days on May 13–15, 2021 at the road course of the Indianapolis Motor Speedway in Speedway, Indiana. This was the first time the venue featured in the 2021 season, later that year, Indycar would return for the Big Machine Spiked Coolers Grand Prix in August, and the eighth edition of this race, having debuted in May 2014

The race was the 5th race of the 16-race calendar, held two weeks after the XPEL 375 at Texas Motor Speedway and two week prior to the 105th Indianapolis 500.

=== Entrants ===
Key	Meaning
R	Rookie
W	Past winner

No.	Driver	Team	Engine
2	(United States) Josef Newgarden W	Team Penske	Chevrolet
3	(New Zealand) Scott McLaughlin R	Team Penske	Chevrolet
4	(Canada) Dalton Kellett	A. J. Foyt Enterprises	Chevrolet
5	(Mexico) Patricio O'Ward	Arrow McLaren SP	Chevrolet
7	(Sweden) Felix Rosenqvist	Arrow McLaren SP	Chevrolet
8	(Sweden) Marcus Ericsson	Chip Ganassi Racing	Honda
9	(New Zealand) Scott Dixon W	Chip Ganassi Racing	Honda
10	(Spain) Álex Palou	Chip Ganassi Racing	Honda
11	(United States) Charlie Kimball	A. J. Foyt Enterprises	Chevrolet
12	(Australia) Will Power W	Team Penske	Chevrolet
14	(France) Sébastien Bourdais	A. J. Foyt Enterprises	Chevrolet
15	(United States) Graham Rahal	Rahal Letterman Lanigan Racing	Honda
18	(United Arab Emirates) Ed Jones	Dale Coyne Racing with Vasser-Sullivan	Honda
20	(United States) Conor Daly	Ed Carpenter Racing	Chevrolet
21	(Netherlands) Rinus VeeKay	Ed Carpenter Racing	Chevrolet
22	(France) Simon Pagenaud W	Team Penske	Chevrolet
26	(United States) Colton Herta	Andretti Autosport w/ Curb-Agajanian	Honda
27	(United States) Alexander Rossi	Andretti Autosport	Honda
28	(United States) Ryan Hunter-Reay	Andretti Autosport	Honda
29	(Canada) James Hinchcliffe	Andretti Steinbrenner Autosport	Honda
30	(Japan) Takuma Sato	Rahal Letterman Lanigan Racing	Honda
48	(United States) Jimmie Johnson R	Chip Ganassi Racing	Honda
51	(France) Romain Grosjean R	Dale Coyne Racing with Rick Ware Racing	Honda
60	(United Kingdom) Jack Harvey	Meyer Shank Racing	Honda
86	(Colombia) Juan Pablo Montoya	Arrow McLaren SP	Chevrolet

== Practice ==
=== Practice 1 ===
Practice 1 took place at 9:30 AM ET on May 14, 2021.

Top Practice Speeds
Pos	No.	Driver	Team	Engine	Lap Time
1	27	(United States) Alexander Rossi	Andretti Autosport	Honda	01:09.8784
2	60	(United Kingdom) Jack Harvey	Meyer Shank Racing	Honda	01:09.9646
3	21	(Netherlands) Rinus VeeKay	Ed Carpenter Racing	Chevrolet	01:10.0624

=== Practice 2 ===
Practice 2 took place at 1:00 PM ET on May 14, 2021.

Top Practice Speeds
Pos	No.	Driver	Team	Engine	Lap Time
1	2	(United States) Josef Newgarden W	Team Penske	Chevrolet	01:09.3323
2	21	(Netherlands) Rinus VeeKay	Ed Carpenter Racing	Chevrolet	01:09.4020
3	12	(Australia) Will Power W	Team Penske	Chevrolet	01:09.4747

== Qualifying ==
Qualifying took place at 4:30 PM ET on May 14, 2021.

=== Qualifying classification ===
Pos	No.	Driver	Team	Engine	Time				Final grid
Pos	No.	Driver	Team	Engine	Round 1		Round 2	Round 3	Final grid
Pos	No.	Driver	Team	Engine	Group 1	Group 2	Round 2	Round 3	Final grid
1	51	(France) Romain Grosjean **R**	Dale Coyne Racing with Rick Ware Racing	Honda	N/A	01:09.8556	01:09.5476	**01:09.4396**	1
2	2	(United States) Josef Newgarden **W**	Team Penske	Chevrolet	N/A	**01:09.6101**	01:09.7837	01:09.5665	2
3	60	(United Kingdom) Jack Harvey	Meyer Shank Racing	Honda	01:09.7589	N/A	01:09.5189	01:09.6528	3
4	10	(Spain) Álex Palou	Chip Ganassi Racing	Honda	N/A	01:09.6589	**01:09.4743**	01:09.7118	4
5	3	(New Zealand) Scott McLaughlin **R**	Team Penske	Chevrolet	N/A	01:09.7537	01:09.7727	01:09.7140	5
6	20	(United States) Conor Daly	Ed Carpenter Racing	Chevrolet	N/A	01:09.7646	01:09.5627	01:09.8662	6
7	21	(Netherlands) Rinus VeeKay	Ed Carpenter Racing	Chevrolet	**01:09.4890**	N/A	01:09.8185	N/A	7
8	26	(United States) Colton Herta	Andretti Autosport w/ Curb-Agajanian	Honda	01:09.5867	N/A	01:09.8222	N/A	8
9	18	(United Arab Emirates) Ed Jones	Dale Coyne Racing with Vasser-Sullivan	Honda	01:09.7152	N/A	01:09.8548	N/A	9
10	22	(France) Simon Pagenaud **W**	Team Penske	Chevrolet	01:09.8061	N/A	01:09.8722	N/A	10
11	15	(United States) Graham Rahal	Rahal Letterman Lanigan Racing	Honda	01:09.7918	N/A	01:09.9060	N/A	11
12	12	(Australia) Will Power **W**	Team Penske	Chevrolet	N/A	01:09.8963	No Time	N/A	12
13	7	(Sweden) Felix Rosenqvist	Arrow McLaren SP	Chevrolet	01:09.8243	N/A	N/A	N/A	13
14	27	(United States) Alexander Rossi	Andretti Autosport	Honda	N/A	01:09.9012	N/A	N/A	14
15	8	(Sweden) Marcus Ericsson	Chip Ganassi Racing	Honda	01:09.8382	N/A	N/A	N/A	15
16	9	(New Zealand) Scott Dixon **W**	Chip Ganassi Racing	Honda	N/A	01:09.9512	N/A	N/A	16
17	30	(Japan) Takuma Sato	Rahal Letterman Lanigan Racing	Honda	01:09.8665	N/A	N/A	N/A	17
18	5	(Mexico) Patricio O'Ward	Arrow McLaren SP	Chevrolet	N/A	01:10.0726	N/A	N/A	18
19	28	(United States) Ryan Hunter-Reay	Andretti Autosport	Honda	01:09.8759	N/A	N/A	N/A	19
20	14	(France) Sébastien Bourdais	A. J. Foyt Enterprises	Chevrolet	N/A	01:10.1830	N/A	N/A	20
21	11	(United States) Charlie Kimball	A. J. Foyt Enterprises	Chevrolet	01:10.6810	N/A	N/A	N/A	21
22	29	(Canada) James Hinchcliffe	Andretti Steinbrenner Autosport	Honda	N/A	01:10.6174	N/A	N/A	22
23	48	(United States) Jimmie Johnson **R**	Chip Ganassi Racing	Honda	01:11.0455	N/A	N/A	N/A	23
24	4	(Canada) Dalton Kellett	A. J. Foyt Enterprises	Chevrolet	N/A	01:10.9312	N/A	N/A	24
25	86	(Colombia) Juan Pablo Montoya	Arrow McLaren SP	Chevrolet	N/A	01:11.1370	N/A	N/A	25

Notes

- **Bold text** indicates fastest time set in session.

== Warmup ==
Warmup took place at 10:45 AM ET on May 15, 2021.

Top Warmup Speeds
Pos	No.	Driver	Team	Engine	Lap Time
1	21	(Netherlands) Rinus VeeKay	Ed Carpenter Racing	Chevrolet	01:10.5598
2	10	(Spain) Álex Palou	Chip Ganassi Racing	Honda	01:10.5924
3	9	(New Zealand) Scott Dixon W	Chip Ganassi Racing	Honda	01:10.6617

== Race ==
The race started at 2:30 PM ET on May 15, 2021.

=== Race classification ===
Pos	No.	Driver	Team	Engine	Laps	Time/Retired	Pit Stops	Grid	Laps Led	Pts.
1	21	(Netherlands) Rinus VeeKay	Ed Carpenter Racing	Chevrolet	85	1:47:08.5773	3	7	33	51
2	51	(France) Romain Grosjean R	Dale Coyne Racing with Rick Ware Racing	Honda	85	+4.9510	3	1	44	44
3	10	(Spain) Álex Palou	Chip Ganassi Racing	Honda	85	+15.0726	3	4	1	36
4	2	(United States) Josef Newgarden W	Team Penske	Chevrolet	85	+18.4472	3	2		32
5	15	(United States) Graham Rahal	Rahal Letterman Lanigan Racing	Honda	85	+26.9813	4	11		30
6	22	(France) Simon Pagenaud W	Team Penske	Chevrolet	85	+27.8704	3	10		28
7	27	(United States) Alexander Rossi	Andretti Autosport	Honda	85	+33.2703	3	14		26
8	3	(New Zealand) Scott McLaughlin R	Team Penske	Chevrolet	85	+36.1862	3	5		24
9	9	(New Zealand) Scott Dixon W	Chip Ganassi Racing	Honda	85	+36.8362	4	16	3	23
10	8	(Sweden) Marcus Ericsson	Chip Ganassi Racing	Honda	85	+37.1971	3	15		20
11	12	(Australia) Will Power W	Team Penske	Chevrolet	85	+39.8020	3	12		19
12	28	(United States) Ryan Hunter-Reay	Andretti Autosport	Honda	85	+40.3892	3	19	4	19
13	26	(United States) Colton Herta	Andretti Autosport w/ Curb-Agajanian	Honda	85	+43.1147	3	8		17
14	18	(United Arab Emirates) Ed Jones	Dale Coyne Racing with Vasser-Sullivan	Honda	85	+43.8110	3	9		16
15	5	(Mexico) Patricio O'Ward	Arrow McLaren SP	Chevrolet	85	+44.5448	4	18		15
16	30	(Japan) Takuma Sato	Rahal Letterman Lanigan Racing	Honda	85	+44.9971	3	17		14
17	7	(Sweden) Felix Rosenqvist	Arrow McLaren SP	Chevrolet	85	+45.4208	3	13		13
18	29	(Canada) James Hinchcliffe	Andretti Steinbrenner Autosport	Honda	85	+1:05.1989	3	22		12
19	14	(France) Sébastien Bourdais	A. J. Foyt Enterprises	Chevrolet	84	+1 Lap	3	20		11
20	4	(Canada) Dalton Kellett	A. J. Foyt Enterprises	Chevrolet	84	+1 Lap	3	24		10
21	86	(Colombia) Juan Pablo Montoya	Arrow McLaren SP	Chevrolet	84	+1 Lap	3	25		9
22	11	(United States) Charlie Kimball	A. J. Foyt Enterprises	Chevrolet	84	+1 Lap	3	21		8
23	60	(United Kingdom) Jack Harvey	Meyer Shank Racing	Honda	84	+1 Lap	4	3		7
24	48	(United States) Jimmie Johnson R	Chip Ganassi Racing	Honda	84	+1 Lap	3	23		6
25	20	(United States) Conor Daly	Ed Carpenter Racing	Chevrolet	50	Contact	3	6		5
Fastest lap: (Netherlands) Rinus VeeKay (Ed Carpenter Racing) – 01:10.8767 (lap 14)

== Championship standings after the race ==
Drivers' Championship standings

Pos.	Driver	Points
1	(New Zealand) Scott Dixon	176
2	(Spain) Alex Palou	163
3	(United States) Josef Newgarden	148
4	(Mexico) Pato O'Ward	146
5	(United States) Graham Rahal	137

Engine manufacturer standings

Pos.	Manufacturer	Points
1	Honda	408
2	Chevrolet	405

- Note: Only the top five positions are included.

Previous race: 2021 XPEL 375	IndyCar Series; 2021 season	Next race: 2021 Indianapolis 500
Previous race: 2020 Harvest Grand Prix	Grand Prix of Indianapolis	Next race: 2021 Big Machine Spiked Coolers Grand Prix
