= IndyCar Series at Texas Motor Speedway =

IndyCar auto race near Fort Worth, Texas

IndyCar Series
- Venue: Texas Motor Speedway
- First race: 1997
- First IndyCar race: 1997
- Last race: 2023
- Distance: 375 mi (603.50 km)
- Laps: 250
- Previous names: True Value 500 (1997–1998); Longhorn 500 (1999); Casino Magic 500 (2000–2001); Boomtown 500 (2002); Bombardier 500 (2003–2004); Bombardier Learjet 500 (2005–2006); Bombardier Learjet 550 (2007–2009); Firestone 550 (2010, 2012–2013); Firestone Twin 275s (2011); Firestone 600 (2014–2016); Rainguard Water Sealers 600 (2017); DXC Technologies 600 (2018–2019); Genesys 300 (2020-2021); XPEL 375 (2021-2022); PPG 375 (2023) Former second race: Lone Star 500 (1998) Mall.com 500 (1999) Excite 500 (2000) Chevy 500 (2001–2004) Firestone Firehawk 600 (2001, CART)
- Most wins (driver): Scott Dixon (5)
- Most wins (team): Team Penske (8)
- Most wins (manufacturer): Chassis: Dallara (25); Engine: Honda (13)

The IndyCar Series held auto racing events at Texas Motor Speedway, near Fort Worth, Texas, from 1997 until 2023. The races had a variety of different title sponsors and distances over the years, and therefore the Texas round has changed names frequently. The latest event, held in 2023, was called the PPG 375.

== History ==
The first Championship/Indy car races in the Dallas/Fort Worth area took place at Arlington Downs Raceway in nearby Arlington, Texas. AAA sanctioned five races from 1947 to 1950. USAC sanctioned ten Championship car events at Texas World Speedway in College Station, Texas. The race was discontinued when the track closed in 1981.

In 1997, the Indy Racing League debuted at Texas Motor Speedway. The event was traditionally a single race held on a Saturday night in early June. On two occasions, (2011, 2021) the even was held as a twin-race format. From 1997 to 2005, and again in 2010–2011, it served as the first race after the Indianapolis 500. In 2020, it served as the season opener due to the COVID-19 pandemic. In 2021 the event moved to the first weekend in May, and in 2022–2023 the event was run in March.

Texas Motor Speedway was removed from the schedule for the 2024 season after the series and track were unable to agree on a date. In September 2024, RACER reported that IndyCar would begin racing on a new street circuit around AT&T Stadium in Arlington starting in 2026. This report would be confirmed the next month, with the race being called the Grand Prix of Arlington. Speculation then appeared that Speedway Motorsports would move their race, which had been held from 2024-2026 in Nashville Superspeedway, back to Texas Motor Speedway on NASCAR weekend as a Saturday night race.

=== Second race ===
From 1998 to 2004, a second 500 km race was held at the track in the fall. It served as the Indy Racing League/IndyCar Series season finale for each of its runnings.

In 2003, Gil de Ferran was leading on lap 187 (of 200) when Kenny Bräck crashed on the backstretch. Bräck suffered critical injuries, and he raced only limitedly afterwards. With the race winding down under caution, and with cleanup still ongoing, officials halted the race on lap 195 when it was clear they would not have time to go back to green. de Ferran was declared the winner in what was his final Indy car race (he had announced his retirement during the season).

== Race length ==
When the track opened, the one-lap distance was measured as 1.5 miles (2.4 km). IndyCar Series races were originally 208 laps (312 mi/500 km) long. In 2001, timing and scoring officials revised the measurement as 1.455 miles (2.342 km), and the races were changed to an even 200 laps (291 mi/468.319 km). In 2007, the race was lengthened to 228 laps in an effort to create a longer product for time value purposes. Using the traditional 1.5-mile (2.4 km) measurement, the race became 342 miles (550.4 km). However, official IndyCar timing and scoring maintained the 1.455-mile (2.342 km) measurement, and the race was officially 331.74 miles (533.88 km). In 2014, the race was extended to 600 kilometers. After revamping the oval track in 2016, the new one lap measurement is 1.44 miles for lap speed calculations.

In addition, the start time was moved to 9:00 p.m. CDT (10:00 p.m. EDT) so the event would take place almost entirely under the lights, rather than in the mid-summer twilight.

The race was slightly shortened to 300 miles and 200 laps in 2020, due to COVID-19 pandemic protocols that used same-day practice and qualifying for the event. The 2020 Genesys 300 was the first IndyCar event since a hiatus due to the pandemic. The 300-mile distance will also be used for 2021.

=== Twin races ===
For 2011, a special Twin race format was adopted, a throwback to the USAC-style twin races of the 1970s and early 1980s. The race would consist of two 275-km (114 laps) races, with each race declaring a separate winner, and each race awarding half points towards the season championship. The starting lineup for the first race was determined during standard time trials. After the completion of the first race, a "halftime" was observed, and the starting lineup for the second race was determined by a random draw.

A mild controversy resulted from the halftime draw for the second race's lineup. It differed from previous "twin" races where the finishing positions for the first race determined the lineup, or the finishing positions were inverted. It was considered unfair by some, and it was magnified when points contenders Will Power and Dario Franchitti drew 3rd and 28th starting positions, respectively. For 2012, the twin-race format was scrapped.

In 2021 Texas hosted a twin-race weekend with two separate points-paying events, named the Genesys 300 and XPEL 375 and held on May 1 and 2 respectively. Qualifying for both rounds was canceled due to rain, with the starting grid decided by the championship standings entering each race. Álex Palou, competing for Chip Ganassi Racing, was awarded pole position for the Genesys 300 as he was the points leader following the previous round at St. Petersburg. Palou's teammate Scott Dixon, who started ninth, won the first race and took his only victory of the season. Dixon advanced to take the lead in the points standings, and consequently started the XPEL 375 on pole the following day. The second race was won by Arrow McLaren SP's Pato O'Ward, who claimed his first IndyCar Series victory.

The event returned to a single-race format for 2022 onwards, and its distance was extended to 375 miles.

== Planned CART race ==
CART scheduled a race at the track for April 29, 2001. Following practice and qualifying, however, the race was cancelled "due to irresolvable concerns over the physical demands placed on the drivers at race speeds." All but four drivers reported they had experienced vertigo-like symptoms due to lateral g-forces from driving in excess of 230 mph (370 km/h) on the steep 24 degree banks.

The Dayton Indy Lights race was completed with two cautions.

== PJ1 usage ==
Starting in 2019 Texas Motor Speedway began to apply PJ1 TrackBite on the high portion of the banking on the track. This was done for NASCAR, who runs multiple events at the speedway and whose cars benefit from the addition of the substance on the track. For IndyCars however the application of PJ1 has created numerous problems. IndyCar's harder tire compounds struggle to grab onto to the PJ1, which combined with the lower downforce levels of IndyCar's current aerodynamic package has led many drivers to compare driving on the substance to driving on ice. Because the drivers avoid the PJ1 coated sections of the banking so called "marbles" from the worn tires are thrown by the cars onto the PJ1 coated surface, exacerbating the problem of low grip on those banks of the track. This in turn makes Texas Motor Speedway a one groove racetrack for the IndyCars and has resulted several accidents in the races run at the speedway since the PJ1 was first applied. IndyCar drivers have become very critical of the track at Texas in recent years and have complained that the PJ1 results in racing that is both uninteresting and unsafe at the same time.

For 2022 IndyCar and Dallara unveiled bargeboards for use at Texas in an attempt to open up the portions of the track coated with PJ1 to the drivers. The bargeboards are expected to add an additional 200 pounds of downforce on top of the UAK18 superspeedway aero kit and will be optional for teams to use during both qualifying and the race. Teams opted not to run the bargeboards in 2022. IndyCar mandated the use of the bargeboards in 2023.

== Past winners ==
=== AAA Championship car history (Arlington) ===
Season	Date	Race Name	Driver	Team	Chassis	Engine	Race Distance		Race Time	Average Speed (mph)
Season	Date	Race Name	Driver	Team	Chassis	Engine	Laps	Miles (km)	Race Time	Average Speed (mph)
1947	November 2	Arlington 100	(United States) Ted Horn	Ted Horn Enterprises	Horn	Offy	95	100.89 (162.366)	1:10:25	86.001
1948	April 25	Arlington 100	(United States) Ted Horn	Horn Enterprises	Horn	Offy	95	100.89 (162.366)	1:17:00	78.644
1949	April 24	Arlington 100	(United States) Johnnie Parsons		Kurtis	Offy	95	100.89 (162.366)	1:16:40	83.15
1949	July 17	Universal Speedways Race of Champions	(United States) Mel Hansen		Lesovsky	Offy	50	53.1 (85.456)		
1950	April 30	MGM Sweepstakes	(United States) Duane Carter		Sprint Car		30	31.86 (51.273)	0:22:44	84.087

=== USAC Championship car history (College Station) ===
Season	Date	Race Name	Driver	Team	Chassis	Engine	Race Distance		Race Time	Average Speed (mph)
Season	Date	Race Name	Driver	Team	Chassis	Engine	Laps	Miles (km)	Race Time	Average Speed (mph)
1973	April 7	Texas 200	(United States) Al Unser	Vels Parnelli Jones	Parnelli	Offenhauser	100	200 (321.868)	1:18:19	153.224
1974 - 1975	Not held									
1976	August 1	Texas 150	(United States) A. J. Foyt	Gilmore Racing	Coyote	Foyt	75	150 (241.401)	0:52:04	172.885
1977	April 2	Texas Grand Prix	(United States) Tom Sneva	Team Penske	McLaren	Cosworth	100	200 (321.868)	1:16:05	157.711
1978	April 15	Coors 200	(United States) Danny Ongais	Interscope Racing	Parnelli	Cosworth	100	200 (321.868)	1:09:08	173.594
1979	April 8	Coors 200	(United States) A. J. Foyt	Gilmore Racing	Coyote	Foyt	100	200 (321.868)	1:32:37	129.574
1980	Race cancelled									

=== IndyCar Series history (Fort Worth, summer) ===
Season	Date	Driver	Team	Chassis	Engine	Race Distance		Race Time	Average Speed (mph)	Report
Season	Date	Driver	Team	Chassis	Engine	Laps	Miles (km)	Race Time	Average Speed (mph)	Report
1996–97	June 7, 1997	(Netherlands) Arie Luyendyk*	Treadway Racing	G-Force	Oldsmobile	208	312 (502.115)	2:19:48	133.903	Report
1998	June 6	(United States) Billy Boat	A. J. Foyt Enterprises	Dallara	Oldsmobile	208	312 (502.115)	2:08:46	145.388	Report
1999	June 12	(Canada) Scott Goodyear	Panther Racing	G-Force	Oldsmobile	208	312 (502.115)	2:00:06	150.069	Report
2000	June 11*	(United States) Scott Sharp	Kelley Racing	Dallara	Oldsmobile	208	312 (502.115)	1:47:20	169.182	Report
2001	June 9	(United States) Scott Sharp	Kelley Racing	Dallara	Oldsmobile	200	300 (482.803)	1:55:44	150.873	Report
2002	June 8	(United States) Jeff Ward	Chip Ganassi Racing	G-Force	Chevrolet	200	300 (482.803)	1:45:50	164.984	Report
2003	June 7	(United States) Al Unser Jr.	Kelley Racing	Dallara	Toyota	200	300 (482.803)	1:43:48	168.213	Report
2004	June 12	(Brazil) Tony Kanaan	Andretti Green Racing	Dallara	Honda	200	300 (482.803)	1:53:24	153.965	Report
2005	June 11	(South Africa) Tomas Scheckter	Panther Racing	Dallara	Chevrolet	200	300 (482.803)	1:45:47	165.047	Report
2006	June 10	(Brazil) Hélio Castroneves	Team Penske	Dallara	Honda	200	300 (482.803)	1:34:01	185.71	Report
2007	June 9	(United States) Sam Hornish Jr.	Team Penske	Dallara	Honda	228	342 (550.395)	1:52:15	177.314	Report
2008	June 7	(New Zealand) Scott Dixon	Chip Ganassi Racing	Dallara	Honda	228	342 (550.395)	2:04:36	159.74	Report
2009	June 6	(Brazil) Hélio Castroneves	Team Penske	Dallara	Honda	228	342 (550.395)	1:55:16	172.677	Report
2010	June 5	(Australia) Ryan Briscoe	Team Penske	Dallara	Honda	228	342 (550.395)	2:04:47	159.508	Report
2011	June 11	(United Kingdom) Dario Franchitti	Chip Ganassi Racing	Dallara	Honda	114	171 (275.197)	0:54:47	181.649	Report
2011	June 11	(Australia) Will Power	Team Penske	Dallara	Honda	114	171 (275.197)	0:48:09	206.693	Report
2012	June 9	(United Kingdom) Justin Wilson	Dale Coyne Racing	Dallara	Honda	228	342 (550.395)	1:59:02	167.217	Report
2013	June 8	(Brazil) Hélio Castroneves	Team Penske	Dallara	Chevrolet	228	342 (550.395)	1:52:17	177.257	Report
2014	June 7	(United States) Ed Carpenter	Ed Carpenter Racing	Dallara	Chevrolet	248	372 (598.676)	2:01:26	178.301	Report
2015	June 6	(New Zealand) Scott Dixon	Chip Ganassi Racing	Dallara	Chevrolet	248	372 (598.676)	1:52:48	191.94	Report
2016	June 12; August 27*	(United States) Graham Rahal	Rahal Letterman Lanigan Racing	Dallara	Honda	248	372 (598.676)	2:29:25	144.901	Report
2017	June 10	(Australia) Will Power	Team Penske	Dallara	Chevrolet	248	372 (598.676)	2:32:31	140.491	Report
2018	June 9	(New Zealand) Scott Dixon	Chip Ganassi Racing	Dallara	Honda	248	372 (598.676)	2:00:53	177.25	Report
2019	June 8	(United States) Josef Newgarden	Team Penske	Dallara	Chevrolet	248	372 (598.676)	1:55:09	186.084	Report
2020	June 6	(New Zealand) Scott Dixon	Chip Ganassi Racing	Dallara	Honda	200	300 (482.803)	1:38:37	175.201	Report
2021	May 1	(New Zealand) Scott Dixon	Chip Ganassi Racing	Dallara	Honda	212	318 (511.771)	1:45:51	173.036	Report
2021	May 2	(Mexico) Patricio O'Ward	Arrow McLaren SP	Dallara	Chevrolet	248	372 (598.676)	2:06:31	169.36	Report
2022	March 20	(United States) Josef Newgarden	Team Penske	Dallara	Chevrolet	248	372 (598.676)	2:09:29	165.467	Report
2023	April 2	(United States) Josef Newgarden	Team Penske	Dallara	Chevrolet	250	375 (603.504)	2:07:07	169.917	Report

- 1997: Billy Boat took the checkered flag as the winner due to a scoring error; Luyendyk would be declared the official winner the following day.
- 2000: Postponed from Saturday night to Sunday afternoon due to rain.
- 2016: Postponed from Saturday to Sunday due to rain, then suspended until August 27 due to rain and logistical issues.

=== IndyCar Series history (Fort Worth, fall) ===
Season	Date	Driver	Team	Chassis	Engine	Race Distance		Race Time	Average Speed (mph)	Report
Season	Date	Driver	Team	Chassis	Engine	Laps	Miles (km)	Race Time	Average Speed (mph)	Report
1998	September 20	(United States) John Paul Jr.	Byrd/Cunningham Racing	G-Force	Oldsmobile	208	312 (502.115)	2:21:53	131.931	Report
1999	October 17	(United States) Mark Dismore	Kelley Racing	Dallara	Oldsmobile	208	312 (502.115)	2:14:16	135.246	Report
2000	October 15	(Canada) Scott Goodyear	Panther Racing	Dallara	Oldsmobile	208	312 (502.115)	1:43:36	175.276	Report
2001	October 6*	(United States) Sam Hornish Jr.	Panther Racing	Dallara	Oldsmobile	200	300 (482.803)	1:43:36	168.523	Report
2002	September 15	(United States) Sam Hornish Jr.	Panther Racing	Dallara	Chevrolet	200	300 (482.803)	1:46:29	163.981	Report
2003	October 13	(Brazil) Gil de Ferran	Team Penske	Dallara	Toyota	195*	292.5 (470.733)	1:48:56	156.268	Report
2004	October 17	(Brazil) Hélio Castroneves	Team Penske	Dallara	Toyota	200	300 (482.803)	1:49:32	159.397	Report

- 2001: Race postponed from September 16 to October 6 due to the September 11 attacks.
- 2003: Race shortened due to crash involving Kenny Bräck.

=== Indy Lights ===
- 2001: Damien Faulkner
- 2002: A. J. Foyt IV
- 2003: Thiago Medeiros
- 2004: Thiago Medeiros
- 2005: Travis Gregg
