= Rinus VeeKay =

Dutch racing driver (born 2000)

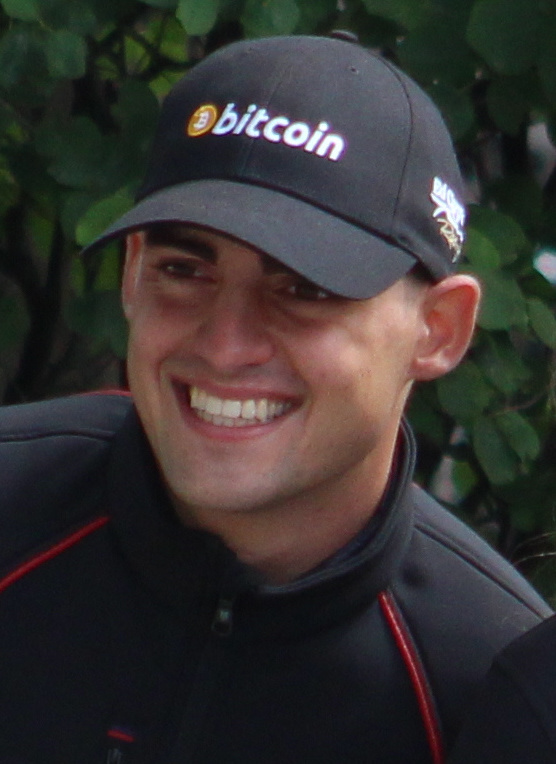
- VeeKay at the 2021 Indianapolis 500
- Nationality: (Netherlands) Dutch
- Born: Rinus van Kalmthout; 11 September 2000 (age 26) Hoofddorp, Netherlands
- Categorisation: FIA Gold

IndyCar Series career
- 115 races run over 6 years
- Team: No. 76 (Juncos Hollinger Racing)
- Best finish: 10th (2026)
- First race: 2020 Genesys 300 (Texas)
- Last race: 2026 Mission Grand Prix of Monterey (Laguna Seca)
- First win: 2021 GMR Grand Prix (Indianapolis)
Wins	Podiums	Poles
1	6	2

Previous series
- 2019 2019 2018 2017 2016–2017 2016 2009–2016: Indy Lights; F3 Asian Winter Series; Pro Mazda Championship; USF2000; MRF Challenge Formula 2000; V de V Challenge Monoplace; Karting

Championship titles
- 2019 2018: F3 Asian Winter Series; Pro Mazda Championship

Awards
- 2014 2020: KNAF Talent First; IndyCar Rookie of the Year

Rinus van Kalmthout (Dutch pronunciation: [ˈrinʏs fɑŋ ˈkɑl(ə)mtɦʌut]; born 11 September 2000), known professionally as Rinus VeeKay, is a Dutch racing driver who competes in the IndyCar Series for Juncos Hollinger Racing. He previously drove for Ed Carpenter Racing from 2020 to 2024, and Dale Coyne Racing in 2025.

== Career ==
=== Karting ===
Van Kalmthout started karting in 2009. The eight-year-old won races in the 4-stroke cadet championship with a DR chassis. He finished second in the championship. During the 2009–2010 winter season, van Kalmthout won the 4-stroke cadet series. The following season, he graduated into the Briggs & Stratton World Formula 4-stroke class, winning the Dutch and Benelux championships. He also focused on the Rotax Max Minimax class, winning the Dutch championship in 2012 and Junior championship in 2013. Throughout 2014 and 2015, van Kalmthout raced in various Rotax Max racing series. He finished second in the Rotax Max Euro Challenge Senior class, behind Australian driver Pierce Lehane.

=== Junior open-wheel formulae ===
Introduced as Rinus VeeKay, van Kalmthout signed with Pabst Racing to race in the American-based USF2000. VeeKay tested the Tatuus USF-17 at Indianapolis Motor Speedway. He ran constant top-ten times for the new driver, new team entry. To further prepare for the 2017 season, VeeKay raced in the final two rounds of the French V de V Challenge Monoplace. In an MP Motorsport entered 2013 Tatuus Formula Renault 2.0 car VeeKay scored five podium finishes in six races. He also competed in the Indian and Middle East based MRF Challenge for the 2016–17 and 2017–18 Championships. In the 2017 U.S. F2000 Championship, VeeKay won six races and finished second in the championship to Oliver Askew.

After winning the 2018 Pro Mazda Championship with Juncos Racing, VeeKay stepped up to the Indy Lights championship for 2019 again with Juncos Racing. He finished second in the championship, again behind Askew.

=== IndyCar Series ===
==== Ed Carpenter Racing (2019–2024) ====
In July 2019, it was announced that VeeKay would join the IndyCar test at Portland with Ed Carpenter Racing. On 20 November the team officially signed him as the replacement for Spencer Pigot.

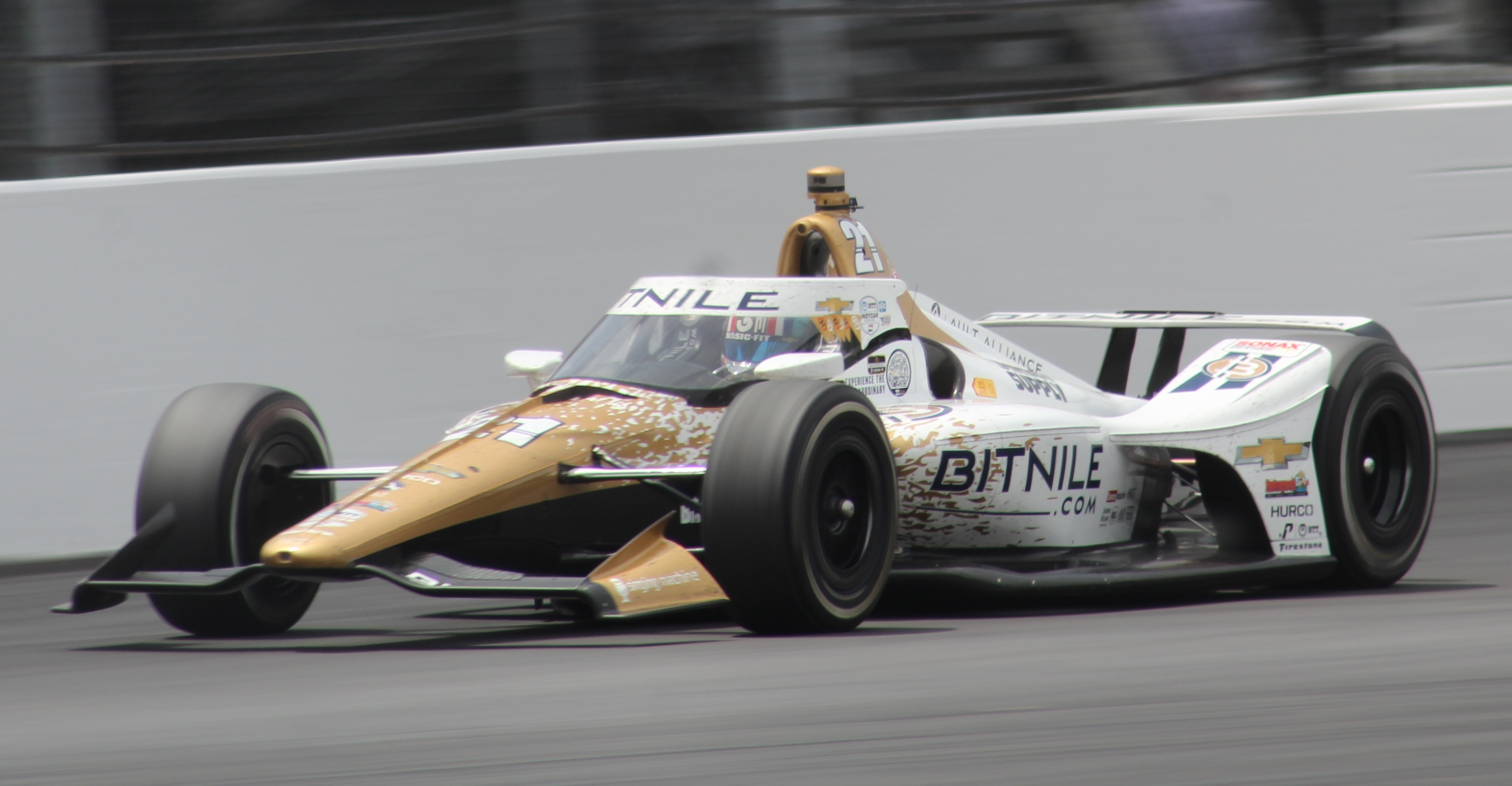
VeeKay during the 2023 Indianapolis 500

In his first IndyCar race in the Genesys 300 at Texas Motor Speedway, VeeKay crashed in practice. He missed qualifying as the team couldn't fix the car in time. In the race, he crashed out on lap 38 and collected Alex Palou. At Iowa Speedway, confusion over a postponed restart led Colton Herta to launch over VeeKay's car from the rear; both drivers were unharmed due to a new laminate aeroscreen introduced for 2020. VeeKay achieved his first top-five finish in IndyCar at the Indy GP and his first podium in the Harvest GP. He was confirmed for a return to ECR in 2021 on 25 October 2020. He won the Indy GP, scoring his first win, five seconds ahead of second-placed Romain Grosjean. VeeKay ran as high as fourth place in the championship after back to back top-ten finishes including a second-place finish in Detroit before he fractured his clavicle during a cycling accident, forcing him to miss the following race at Road America. After the season, VeeKay and ECR announced he had re-signed with the team for another season.

Shortly after the 2024 season, in which VeeKay placed thirteenth in the championship with a best race finish of fifth, it was reported by Racer that Ed Carpenter Racing had cut ties with VeeKay. The decision came as a "surprise" to VeeKay, who was actively negotiating a contract extension with the team.

==== Dale Coyne Racing (2025) ====
On 14 February 2025, it was announced that VeeKay would be joining Dale Coyne Racing as a full-time entrant in the 2025 season, driving the No. 18 entry. VeeKay was the final driver announced on the 2025 IndyCar grid and signed a late-breaking deal with Dale Coyne Racing after not securing a ride immediately following his departure from Ed Carpenter Racing.

In the 2025 Indianapolis 500 qualifying, VeeKay secured his spot in the race through Last Chance Qualifying, where he edged out his Dale Coyne Racing teammate Jacob Abel to secure a place in the field.

On 20 July 2025, VeeKay scored his first IndyCar podium finish with Dale Coyne Racing, and his first IndyCar podium in nearly three years with a second-place finish at the Grand Prix of Toronto.

Shortly after the season finale, it was reported by Racer that VeeKay had cut ties with Dale Coyne Racing.

==== Juncos Hollinger Racing (2026) ====
On 14 October 2025, it was announced that VeeKay would be joining Juncos Hollinger Racing as a full-time entrant in the 2026 season.

== Personal life ==
His father Marijn van Kalmthout was also a racecar driver, winning the BRL Light in 2006 and 2008.

== Karting record ==
=== Karting career summary ===
Season	Series	Team	Position
2009	Dutch 4-Stroke Sprint Championship — Cadet 160		4th
2009	Dutch Championship — Mini		14th
2009	Chrono Dutch Rotax Max Challenge — Micro Max		13th
2010	Chrono Rotax Max Winter Cup — Micro Max		6th
2010	Dutch 4-Stroke Winter Championship — Rookie		1st
2010	Dutch 4-Stroke Sprint Championship — Cadet 160	Redeker Racing Team	2nd
2010	Chrono Dutch Rotax Max Challenge — Micro Max		15th
2011	Euro Wintercup — Rotax Mini Max	Team TKP	3rd
2011	Dutch 4-Stroke Sprint Championship — World Formula	Speedsupport	1st
2011	Benelux 4-Stroke Sprint Championship — World Formula	Speedsupport	1st
2011	BNL Karting Series — Rotax Mini Max	Team TKP	18th
2011	Chrono Dutch Rotax Max Challenge — Mini Max	Team TKP	19th
2012	Chrono Rotax Max Winter Cup — Mini Max	Team TKP	13th
2012	Chrono Dutch Rotax Max Challenge — Mini Max	Team TKP	1st
2013	Chrono Winter Series — Rotax Junior	Team TKP	11th
2013	Dutch Championship — Rotax Junior	Team TKP	1st
2013	BNL Karting Series — Rotax Junior		6th
2013	Rotax International Open — Junior		8th
2013	Rotax Max Challenge Grand Finals — Junior	Marijn van Kalmthout	18th
2013	SKUSA SuperNationals — Rotax Junior	PSL Karting	12th
2014	WSK Champions Cup — KFJ		26th
2014	South Garda Winter Cup — KFJ		20th
2014	CIK-FIA Karting Academy Trophy		3rd
2014	German Karting Championship — KFJ	Keijser Racing	20th
2014	CIK-FIA European Championship— KFJ	Keijser Racing	48th
2014	Rotax Max Euro Trophy — Junior		21st
2014	Rotax International Open — Junior		22nd
2015	Rotax Max Winter Cup — Senior	Team TKP	8th
2015	BNL Karting Series — Rotax Senior	Daems Racing	3rd
2015	Rotax Max Euro Trophy — Senior	Daems Racing	2nd
2015	Rotax Max Challenge Grand Finals — Senior	Daems Racing	65th
2016	Rotax Max Winter Cup — Senior	Daems Racing	7th
2016	BNL Karting Series — Rotax Senior		10th

== Racing record ==
=== Racing career summary ===
Season	Series	Team	Races	Wins	Poles	FLaps	Podiums	Points	Position
2016	V de V Challenge Monoplace	MP Motorsport	6	0	1	1	4	0	NC†
2016–17	MRF Challenge Formula 2000	MRF Racing	12	0	0	0	0	58	10th
2017	U.S. F2000 National Championship	Pabst Racing Services	14	3	1	3	12	344	**2nd**
2017	BOSS GP Series – Open Class	Mansell Motorsport	6	2	1	1	5	116	**2nd**
2017–18	MRF Challenge Formula 2000	MRF Racing	16	3	2	7	11	245	**3rd**
2018	Pro Mazda Championship	Juncos Racing	16	7	6	3	10	412	**1st**
2018	BOSS GP Series – Open Class	Mansell Motorsport	2	0	0	0	1	22	5th
2019	Indy Lights	Juncos Racing	18	6	7	6	14	465	**2nd**
2019	F3 Asian Winter Series	Dragon Hitech GP	9	4	2	4	8	184	**1st**
2020	IndyCar Series	Ed Carpenter Racing	14	0	1	1	1	289	14th
2021	IndyCar Series	Ed Carpenter Racing	15	1	0	1	2	308	12th
2021	IMSA SportsCar Championship – LMP2	DragonSpeed USA	1	0	0	0	0	0	NC‡
2022	IndyCar Series	Ed Carpenter Racing	17	0	1	0	1	331	12th
2022	IMSA SportsCar Championship – LMP2	Racing Team Nederland	1	0	0	0	1	0	NC‡
2023	IndyCar Series	Ed Carpenter Racing	17	0	0	0	0	277	14th
2023	IMSA SportsCar Championship – LMP2	TDS Racing	1	0	0	0	0	0	NC‡
2024	IndyCar Series	Ed Carpenter Racing	17	0	0	0	0	300	13th
2025	IndyCar Series	Dale Coyne Racing	17	0	0	0	1	305	14th
2026	IndyCar Series	Juncos Hollinger Racing	18	0	0	1	1	378	10th

^{†} As van Kalmthout was a guest driver, he was ineligible for points.

^{‡} Points only counted towards the Michelin Endurance Cup, and not the overall LMP2 Championship.

^{*} Season still in progress.

=== Complete F3 Asian Winter Series results ===
(key) (Races in bold indicate pole position) (Races in italics indicate fastest lap)

Year	Team	1	2	3	4	5	6	7	8	9	Pos	Points
2019	Dragon Hitech GP	CHA; 1; 1	CHA; 2; 1	CHA; 3; 3	**SEP1**; **1**; 1	SEP1; 2; 1	**SEP1**; **3**; 2	SEP2; 1; 6	SEP2; 2; 3	SEP2; 3; 3	1st	184

=== American open-wheel racing results ===
==== U.S. F2000 National Championship ====
Year	Team	1	2	3	4	5	6	7	8	9	10	11	12	13	14	Rank	Points
2017	Pabst Racing Services	STP; 3	STP; 2	BAR; 3	BAR; 4	IMS; 6	IMS; 2	ROA; 1	**ROA**; 1	IOW; 2	TOR; 3	TOR; 2	MOH; 3	MOH; 2	WGL; 1	2nd	344

==== Pro Mazda Championship ====
Year	Team	1	2	3	4	5	6	7	8	9	10	11	12	13	14	15	16	Rank	Points
2018	Juncos Racing	STP; 1	**STP**; 1	BAR; 5	BAR; 4	IMS; 3	IMS; 14	LOR; 4	ROA; 5	ROA; 5	**TOR**; 1	**TOR**; 1	**MOH**; 1	MOH; 1	GMP; 1	**POR**; 2	**POR**; 2	1st	412

==== Indy Lights ====
Year	Team	1	2	3	4	5	6	7	8	9	10	11	12	13	14	15	16	17	18	Rank	Points
2019	Juncos Racing	STP; 5	STP; 1	COA; 2	COA; 4	IMS; 3	**IMS**; 1	INDY; 3	**ROA**; 7	**ROA**; 1	TOR; 3	TOR; 9	MOH; 3	MOH; 3	GTW; 2	**POR**; 1	**POR**; 2	**LAG**; 1	**LAG**; 1	2nd	465

==== IndyCar Series ====
(key)

Year	Team	No.	Chassis	Engine	1	2	3	4	5	6	7	8	9	10	11	12	13	14	15	16	17	18	Rank	Points	Ref
2020	Ed Carpenter Racing	21	Dallara DW12	Chevrolet	TXS; 22	IMS; 5	ROA; 13	ROA; 14	IOW; 20	IOW; 17	INDY; 20	GTW; 6	GTW; 4	MOH; 8	MOH; 11	**IMS**; 3	IMS; 17	STP; 15					14th	289	
2021	Ed Carpenter Racing	21	Dallara DW12	Chevrolet	ALA; 6	STP; 9	TXS; 20	TXS; 9	IMS; 1	INDY; 8	DET; 2	DET; 18	ROA	MOH; 16	NSH; 24	IMS; 24	GTW; 21	POR; 17	LAG; 18	LBH; 25			12th	308	
2022	Ed Carpenter Racing	21	Dallara DW12	Chevrolet	STP; 6	TXS; 10	LBH; 13	**ALA**; 3*	IMS; 23	INDY; 33	DET; 16	ROA; 17	MOH; 4	TOR; 13	IOW; 4	IOW; 19	IMS; 6	NSH; 12	GTW; 26	POR; 20	LAG; 14		12th	331	
2023	Ed Carpenter Racing	21	Dallara DW12	Chevrolet	STP; 21	TXS; 11	LBH; 26	ALA; 16	IMS; 13	INDY; 10	DET; 18	ROA; 12	MOH; 15	TOR; 13	IOW; 17	IOW; 18	NSH; 14	IMS; 11	GTW; 11	POR; 6	LAG; 18		14th	277	
2024	Ed Carpenter Racing	21	Dallara DW12	Chevrolet	STP; 8	THE; DNQ	LBH; 14	ALA; 17	IMS; 26	INDY; 9	DET; 14	ROA; 24	LAG; 26	MOH; 19	IOW; 5	IOW; 9	TOR; 8	GTW; 10	POR; 11	MIL; 14	MIL; 7	NSH; 12	13th	300	
2025	Dale Coyne Racing	18	Dallara DW12	Honda	STP; 9	THE; 17	LBH; 19	ALA; 4	IMS; 9	INDY; 27	DET; 27	GTW; 7	ROA; 10	MOH; 9	IOW; 16	IOW; 12	TOR; 2	LAG; 23	POR; 17	MIL; 15	NSH; 13		14th	305	
2026	Juncos Hollinger Racing	76	Dallara DW12	Chevrolet	STP; 9	PHX; 22	ARL; 14	ALA; 14	LBH; 13	IMS; 15	INDY; 6	DET; 12	GTW; 4	ROA; 18	MOH; 4	NSH; 12	POR; 4	MRK; 7	WSH; 23	MIL; 3	MIL; 7	LAG; 16	10th	378	

==== Indianapolis 500 ====
Year	Chassis	Engine	Start	Finish	Team
2020	Dallara	Chevrolet	4	20	Ed Carpenter Racing
2021	Dallara	Chevrolet	3	8	Ed Carpenter Racing
2022	Dallara	Chevrolet	3	33	Ed Carpenter Racing
2023	Dallara	Chevrolet	2	10	Ed Carpenter Racing
2024	Dallara	Chevrolet	7	9	Ed Carpenter Racing
2025	Dallara	Honda	31	27	Dale Coyne Racing
2026	Dallara	Chevrolet	11	6	Juncos Hollinger Racing

=== Complete IMSA SportsCar Championship results ===
(key) (Races in bold indicate pole position; races in italics indicate fastest lap)

Year	Entrant	Class	Make	Engine	1	2	3	4	5	6	7	Rank	Points
2021	DragonSpeed USA	LMP2	Oreca 07	Gibson GK428 4.2 L V8	DAY; 10†	SEB	WGL	WGL	ELK	LGA	PET	NC†	0†
2022	Racing Team Nederland	LMP2	Oreca 07	Gibson GK428 V8	DAY; 2†	SEB	LGA	MOH	WGL	ELK	PET	NC†	0†
2023	TDS Racing	LMP2	Oreca 07	Gibson GK428 4.2 L V8	DAY; 10†	SEB	LGA	WGL	ELK	IMS	PET	NC†	0†

^{†} Points only counted towards the Michelin Endurance Cup, and not the overall LMP2 Championship. ^{*} Season still in progress.

Sporting positions
Preceded by Victor Franzoni	Pro Mazda Championship; Champion; 2018	Succeeded by Kyle Kirkwood (Indy Pro 2000 Championship)
Preceded by Inaugural	F3 Asian Winter Series; Champion; 2019	Succeeded by Incumbent
