= Conor Daly =

American racing driver (born 1991)

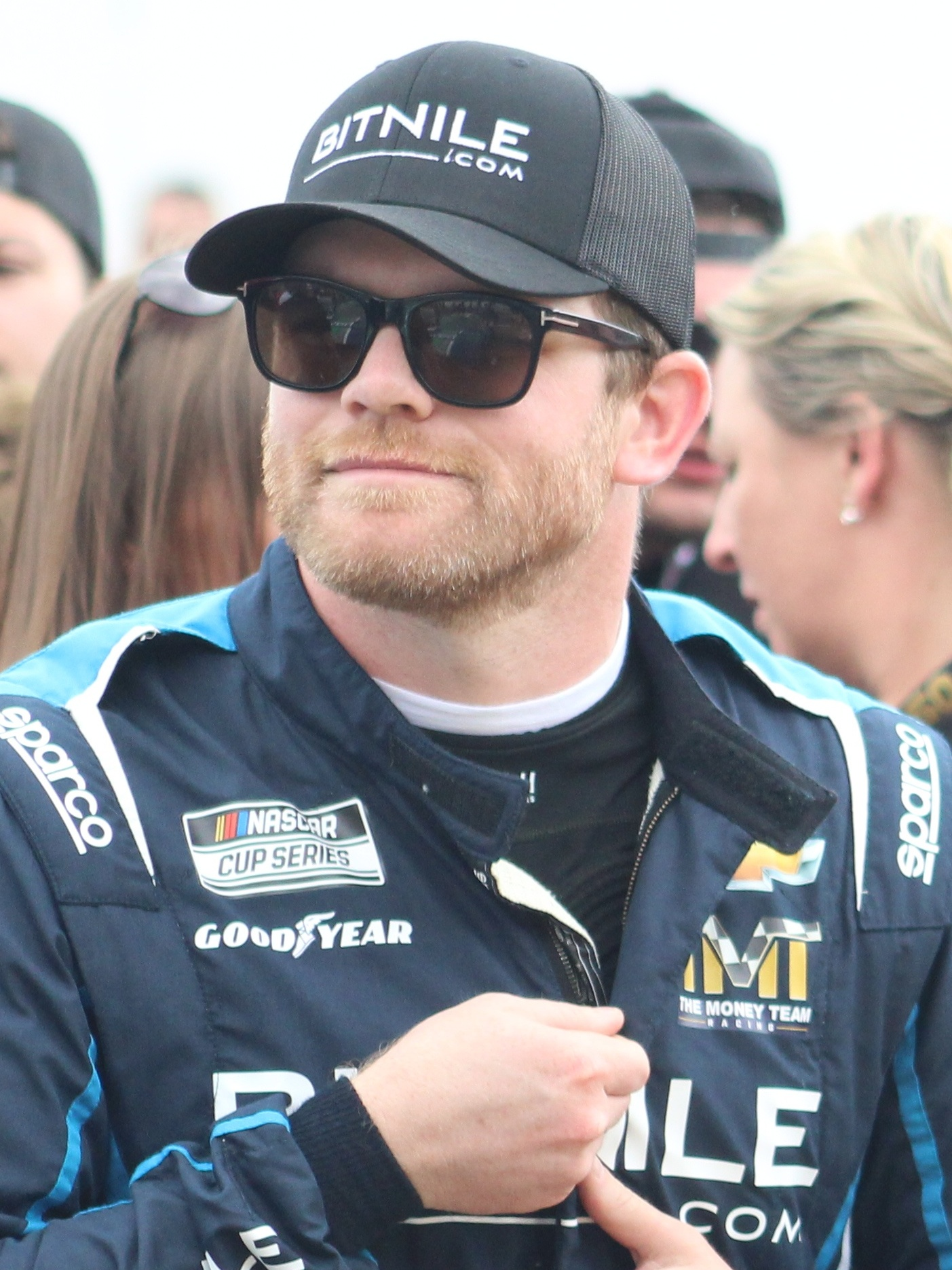
- Daly at Daytona International Speedway in 2023
- Nationality: (United States) American
- Born: Conor James Daly; December 15, 1991 (age 34) Noblesville, Indiana, U.S.
- Relatives: Derek Daly (father); Doug Boles (stepfather)
- Categorisation: FIA Gold
- Achievements: 2012–13 MRF Challenge Champion; 2010 Star Mazda Championship Champion
- Awards: 2017 IndyCar Series Most Popular Driver

IndyCar Series career
- 131 races run over 11 years
- Team: No. 24 (Dreyer & Reinbold Racing)
- Best finish: 17th (2020, 2022)
- First race: 2013 Indianapolis 500 (Indianapolis)
- Last race: 2026 Indianapolis 500 (Indianapolis)
Wins	Podiums	Poles
0	2	1

NASCAR Cup Series career
- 3 races run over 2 years
- 2023 position: 55th
- Best finish: 40th (2022)
- First race: 2022 Bank of America Roval 400 (Charlotte Roval)
- Last race: 2023 EchoPark Automotive Grand Prix (COTA)
Wins	Top tens	Poles
0	0	0

NASCAR O'Reilly Auto Parts Series career
- 3 races run over 3 years
- 2024 position: 63rd
- Best finish: 63rd (2024)
- First race: 2018 Johnsonville 180 (Road America)
- Last race: 2024 Pennzoil 250 (Indianapolis)
Wins	Top tens	Poles
0	0	0

NASCAR FedEx Freight Truck Series career
- 9 races run over 5 years
- 2026 position: 51st
- Best finish: 51st (2026)
- First race: 2020 World of Westgate 200 (Las Vegas)
- Last race: 2026 Zero Carbon Bioethanol 150 (Phoenix)
Wins	Top tens	Poles
0	0	0

ARCA Menards Series career
- 1 race run over 1 year
- Best finish: 83rd (2024)
- First race: 2024 Zinsser SmartCoat 150 (Mid-Ohio)
Wins	Top tens	Poles
0	1	0

Previous series
- 2022—2023 2018, 2023—2024 2020, 2021, 2023—2024, 2026 2024 2013–2014 2011–2012 2011 2009–2010: NASCAR Cup Series; NASCAR Xfinity Series; NASCAR Craftsman Truck Series; ARCA Menards Series; GP2 Series; GP3 Series; Indy Lights; Star Mazda Championship
- Statistics up to date as of November 6, 2026.

Conor James Daly (born December 15, 1991) is an American-Irish professional racing driver who competes full-time in the IndyCar Series, driving the No. 24 Honda for Dreyer & Reinbold Racing. He has previously competed in the NASCAR Cup Series, Xfinity Series, GP2 Series, ARCA Menards Series, Nitrocross and Road to Indy.

== Early racing career ==
=== Karting ===
At the age of ten, Daly began competing in karting, and he won the World Karting Association Grand Nationals in 2006. The following year, Daly progressed to car racing and began racing cars full-time in 2008 in the Skip Barber National Championship, winning first place with five wins in 14 races along with Formula Ford.

On October 10, 2010, Daly was the runner-up at the RoboPong 200 all-star kart event at the New Castle Motorsports Park along with teammate Graham Rahal. He finished runner-up to a team driven by Jay Howard and Bill McLaughlin Jr.

=== Star Mazda Championship ===
In 2009, Daly competed in the Star Mazda Championship for Andersen Racing and finished third in points with a win at New Jersey Motorsports Park. He returned to the series the following year, driving for Juncos Hollinger Racing.

Daly became series champion after finishing in the top four positions in each of the 12 races, prior to clinching the title at Mosport International Raceway on August 28, 2010. He also set a series record of nine poles and seven wins en route to his championship.

=== Indy Lights ===
In 2011, Daly competed part-time in the Indy Lights series with Sam Schmidt Motorsports. His best result of the season was a win at the Grand Prix of Long Beach.

In 2013, Daly returned to Indy Lights with a one-off appearance in the Houston race for Team Moore Racing, finishing third.

=== GP3 Series ===
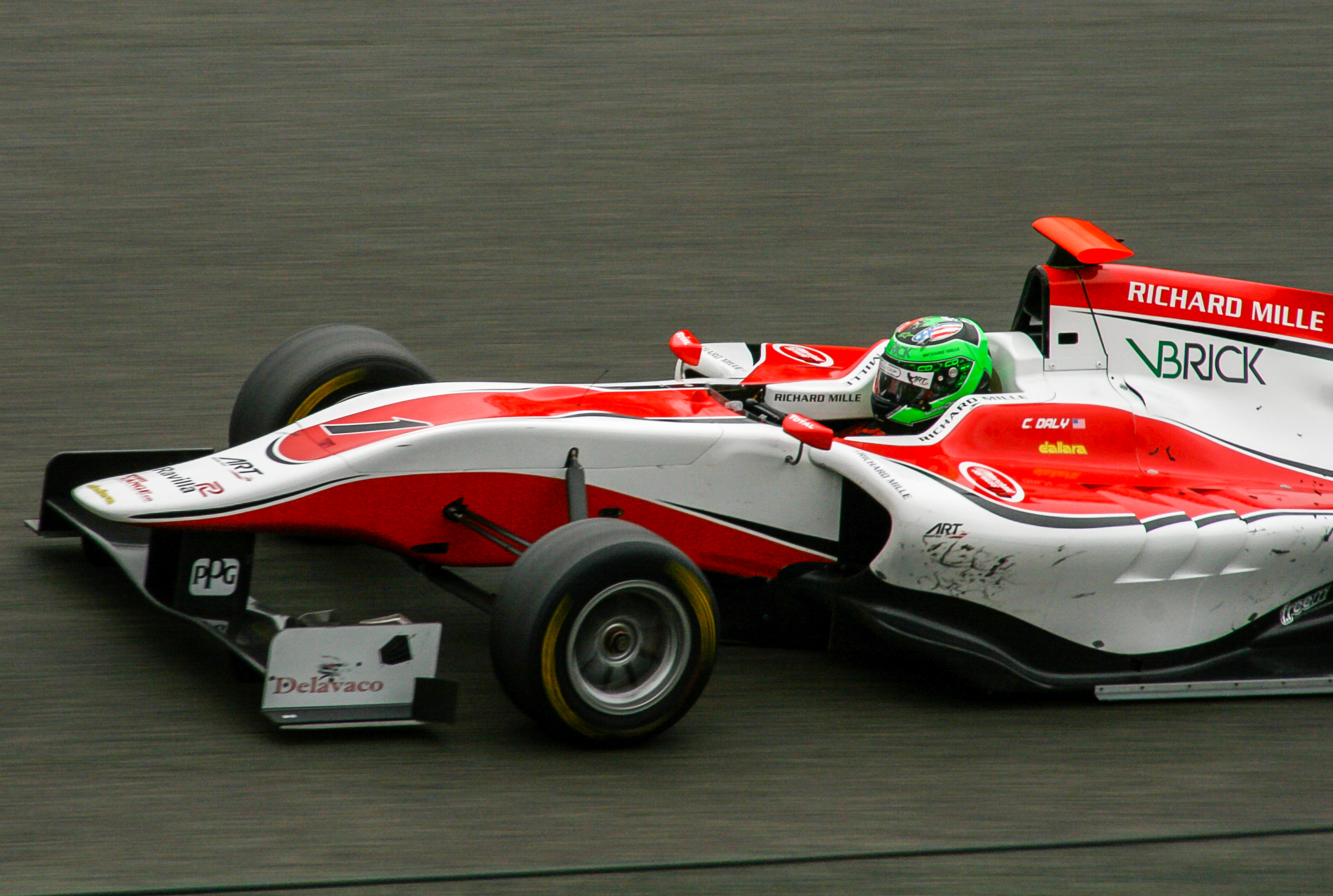
Daly at Sprint Race in Spa-Francorchamps 2013

Alongside his commitments in the Indy Lights series, Daly competed in GP3 in 2011 with Carlin Motorsport.

In 2012, Daly continued in GP3 driving for the Lotus GP team. He took his maiden GP3 win in the second race of the season at Barcelona. In the second race at Monaco, Daly made contact with the damaged car of Dmitry Suranovich which launched Daly into a catch fence and forced the race to be red flagged.

For 2013, Daly remained in GP3, racing with the ART Grand Prix team. Daly captured one win at the Valencia Street Circuit feature race and placed third in the championship.

=== GP2 Series ===
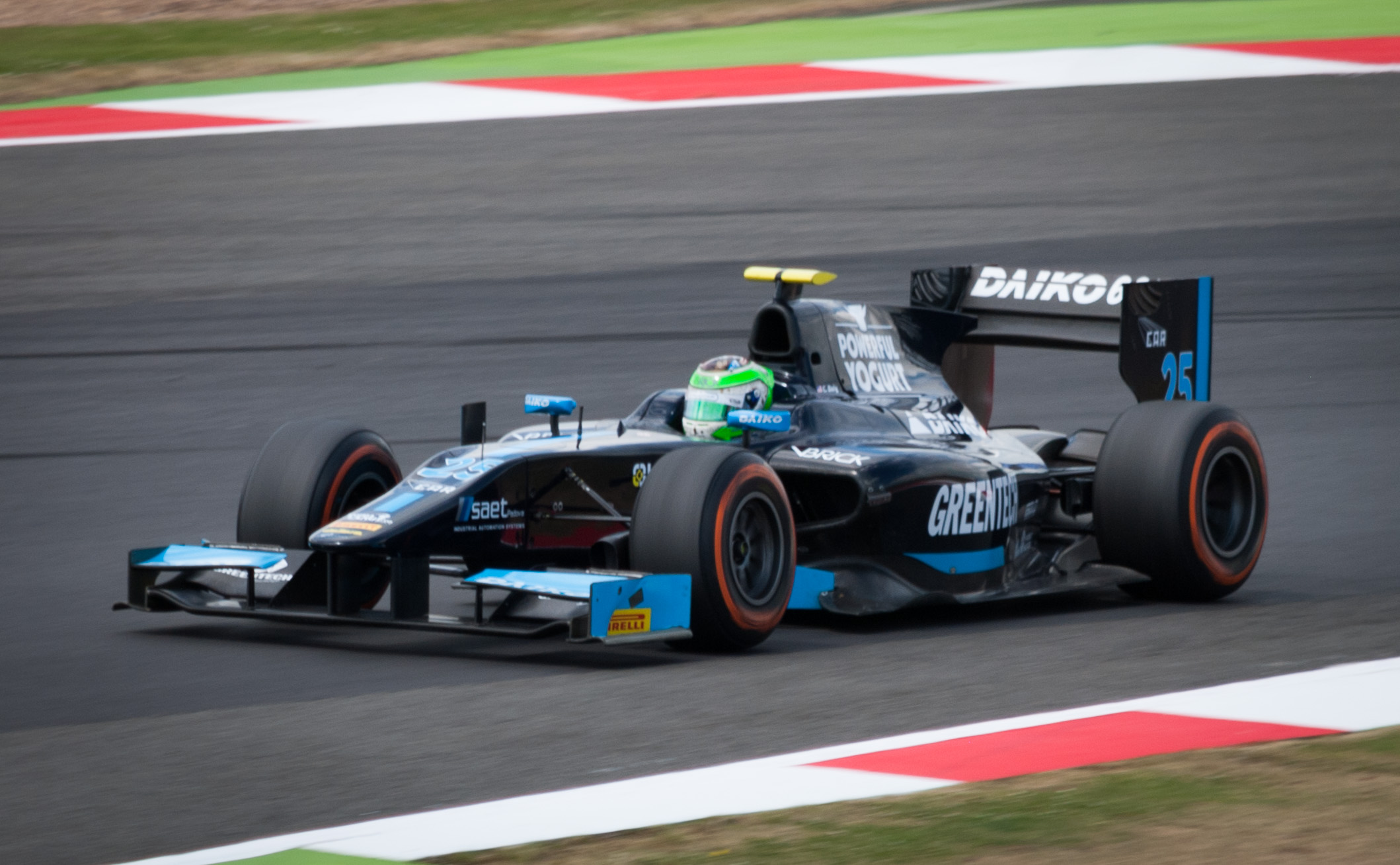
Daly at Silverstone during the 2014 GP2 Series.

Daly competed in the 2013 GP2 Series season season-opener at Sepang International Circuit with Hilmer Motorsport. He finished seventh in the sprint race and scored two championship points.

In 2014, Daly competed with Venezuela GP Lazarus for 18 of the 22 rounds, with a best finish of seventh place in the sprint race at the Hungaroring.

== IndyCar Series ==
=== Part-time rides (2013, 2015) ===
Daly drove in the 2013 Indianapolis 500 for A. J. Foyt Enterprises. He finished the race in 22nd position.

In 2015, Daly subbed in for Rocky Moran Jr. at the Long Beach GP with Dale Coyne Racing. He then returned for the 2015 Indianapolis 500 in the Smithfield Foods "Fueled by Bacon" special run by Schmidt Peterson Motorsports, but was forced to retire before the green flag due to a mechanical failure. Daly replaced James Hinchcliffe for three rounds following Hinchcliffe's injury from a practice crash leading up to the Indy 500. Daly finished sixth at the second race at Detroit.

=== Full-time with Coyne and Foyt (2016–2017) ===
In 2016, Daly raced the full 2016 IndyCar season for Dale Coyne Racing. He led 56 laps at five different races and finished second in the first race at Detroit for his first career IndyCar podium. For the 2017 season, Daly raced the No. 4 car for A. J. Foyt Enterprises.

=== Return to part-time (2018–2019) ===
Daly lost his ride with Foyt for 2018, but was signed by Coyne for the 2018 Indianapolis 500. His No. 17 car, fielded in conjunction with Thom Burns Racing, was sponsored by the United States Air Force.

In 2019, Andretti Autosport signed Daly to enter the Indianapolis 500, where he finished 10th. On June 4, 2019, Daly replaced Max Chilton at Carlin for the Texas Motor Speedway race, finishing 11th. He replaced Chilton at the remaining oval races for the season with a best result of sixth place at Gateway.

On August 29, 2019, Daly was announced as a replacement for Marcus Ericsson for the round at Portland as Ericsson had been called up by Alfa Romeo to be on reserve driver duty at the F1 race at Spa. Daly would also return to Andretti Autosport for the season finale.

=== Split schedule with Carpenter and Carlin (2020–2021) ===
On December 9, 2019, it was revealed that Daly was signed to contest the twelve road and street circuit races in the No. 20 Ed Carpenter Racing entry for the 2020 IndyCar Series season. He was also contracted to compete in the 2020 Indianapolis 500 in an additional Ed Carpenter Racing entry. On March 10, 2020, Carlin announced they have signed Daly to compete in the remaining oval races in the No. 59 entry, thus giving Daly full-time status for the 2020 season.

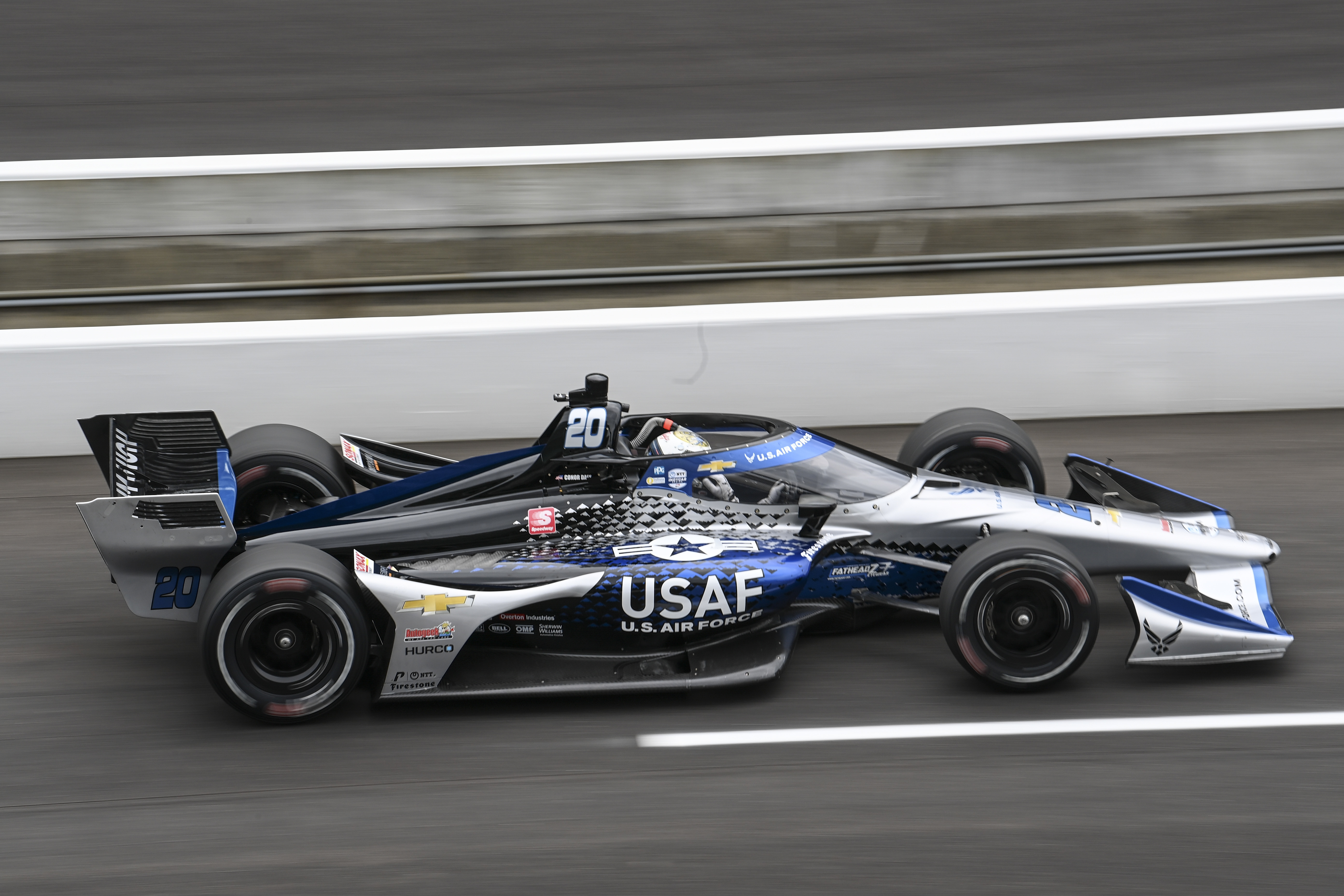
Daly during the 2021 Indy GP

Daly finished sixth at the 2020 season opener at Texas Motor Speedway. He claimed his first IndyCar Series pole position at the first race of a doubleheader at Iowa Speedway, which was the first pole for Carlin as an IndyCar team.

Daly and teammate Rinus VeeKay dominated the first half of the 2021 Indianapolis 500, leading 72 of the first 102 laps. However, damage to Daly's nose cone from an accident involving Graham Rahal on lap 119 prevented him from seriously challenging for the lead again, and he finished thirteenth. Daly led the most laps of any driver during the race, with forty.

=== Full-time with Carpenter (2022–2023) ===
In 2022, Daly would run full-time in the No. 20 for Ed Carpenter Racing. His best result that year was a fifth place at the IMS Grand Prix on May 14. He would go on to finish 17th in points.

In June 2023, following a 15th-place finish at the Detroit round, Ed Carpenter Racing parted ways with Daly, with Ryan Hunter-Reay announced as his replacement a day later.

=== Racing after Carpenter and Juncos Hollinger full-time (2024–2025) ===
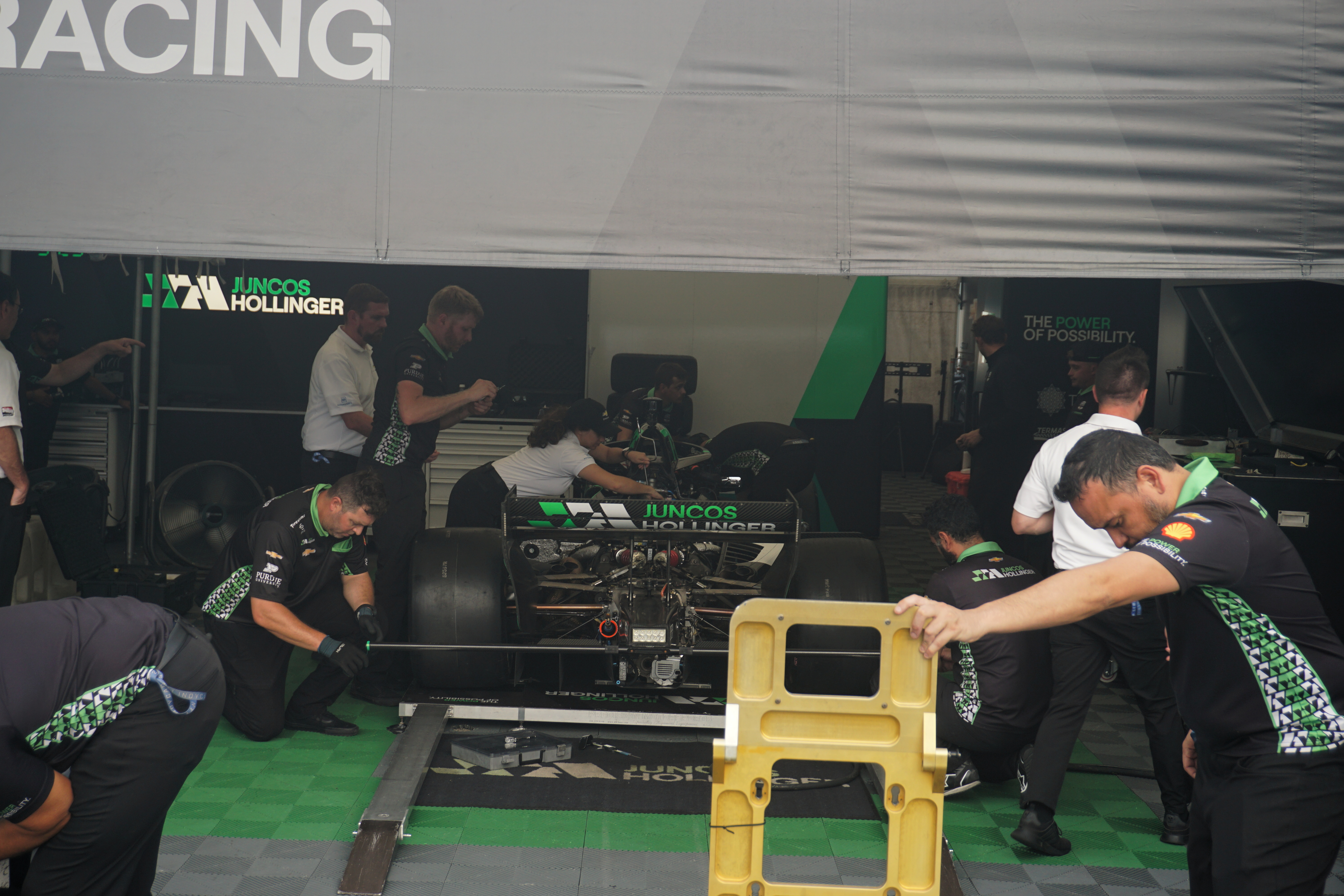
Daly's car in the garage before the 2024 Hy-Vee Milwaukee Mile 250s

Daly ran the No. 24 entry for Dreyer & Reinbold Racing with Cusick Motorsports at the 2024 Indianapolis 500. After starting in 29th position, he finished 10th after switching to an alternate pit strategy. Daly led 22 of the 200 laps and was the race's biggest mover, gaining 19 positions.

After substituting for Jack Harvey in the No. 18 Dale Coyne Racing entry at the second Iowa race, Daly was announced as Agustin Canapino's replacement at Juncos Hollinger Racing for the rest of the season on August 14. Daly achieved his second career IndyCar podium - and the first for Juncos Hollinger Racing - at the first Milwaukee Mile race on August 31, finishing third.

On December 18, 2024, Juncos Hollinger Racing announced that Daly would compete full-time for the team during the 2025 IndyCar Series, piloting the No. 78 he drove at the end of the 2024 season. It was later announced that Daly would drive No. 76 car after signing gas station brand 76 as a sponsor.

Daly would lose his seat at Juncos after 2025, with the team electing to keep his teammate Sting Ray Robb, and sign Rinus VeeKay as his replacement for the 2026 IndyCar Season.

Daly remained at Juncos in a development driver capacity, which he coupled with TV work for FOX.

=== Dreyer & Reinbold signing (2026–) ===
In March 2026, Dreyer & Reinbold Racing announced that Daly was one of their drivers to compete in the 2026 Indianapolis 500, partnering with Jack Harvey. He qualified in eighth place for the race and led four laps, before coming home in 12th place.

On September 5, 2026, it was announced that Daly will compete full-time beginning in 2027, driving the No. 24 for Dreyer & Reinbold.

== Other racing ==
=== Formula One ===
In May 2012, Daly performed a straight line aero test for Force India at Cotswold Airport in Gloucestershire, England.

=== MRF Challenge ===
Daly won the 2012–13 MRF Challenge Formula 2000 Championship in India, claiming four wins and two further podiums.

=== NASCAR ===
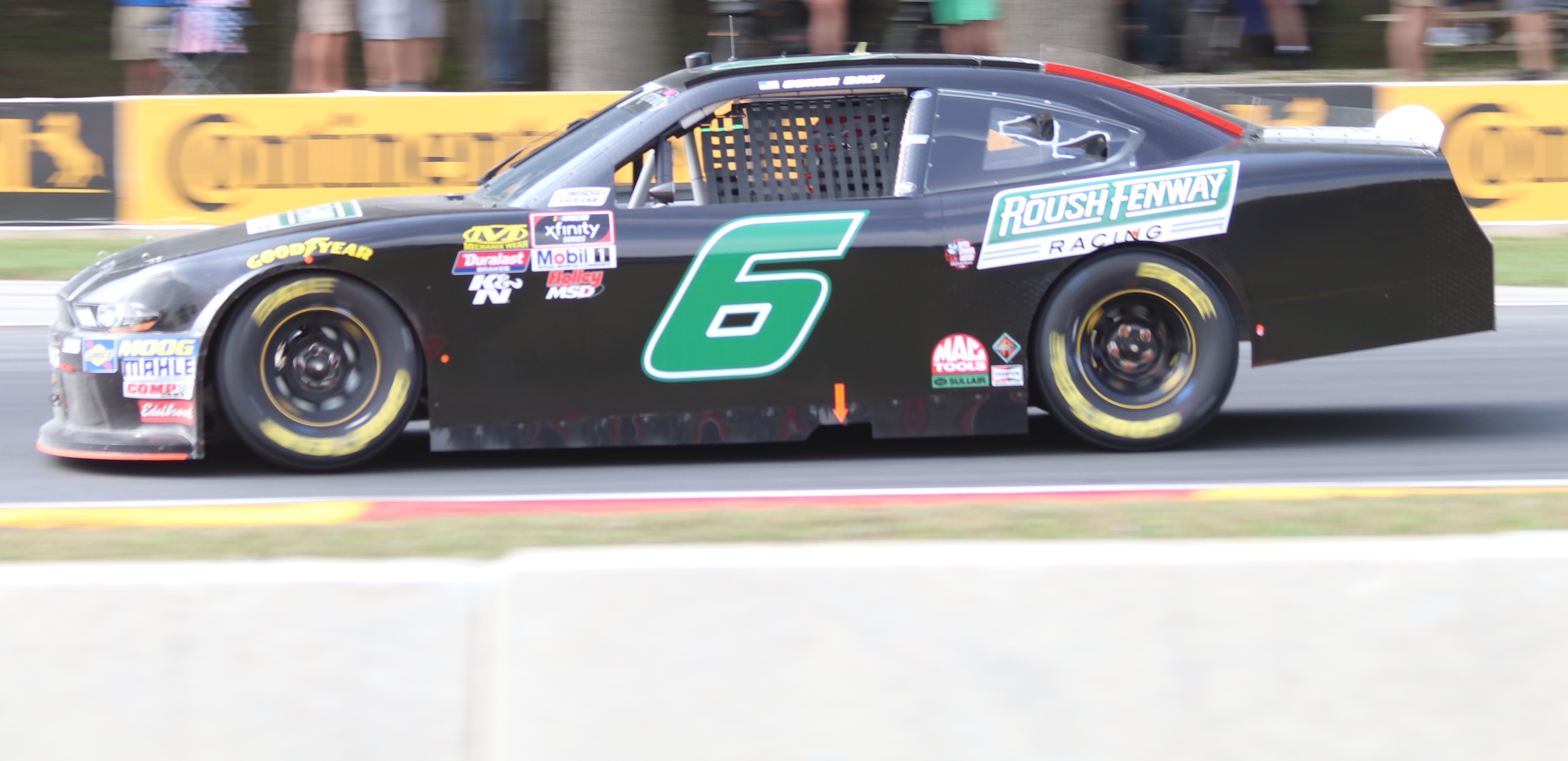
Daly in his NASCAR debut at Road America in 2018

On May 11, 2018, Daly announced that he would be making his NASCAR Xfinity Series debut at Road America in August, driving the No. 6 Ford Mustang for Roush Fenway Racing with sponsorship from Eli Lilly and Company.

Both Daly and his teammate, full-time Roush Xfinity driver Ryan Reed, are Type 1 diabetics, and that was how the deal was put together. Before the race, it was announced that Lilly would not be sponsoring Daly in the race when it was discovered that his father Derek had used a racial slur during an interview in the 1980s.

In 2020, Daly joined Niece Motorsports to make his second NASCAR start, and his first in the NASCAR Truck Series, where he competed in the race at Las Vegas Motor Speedway in the team's No. 42 truck. Daly had a $1 bet with Niece teammate and iRacing rival Travis Pastrana on the outcome of the race, which Daly won by virtue of his eighteenth-place finish. Daly returned to Niece Motorsports to drive at Las Vegas for them in 2021, in the track's February race and in the No. 44.

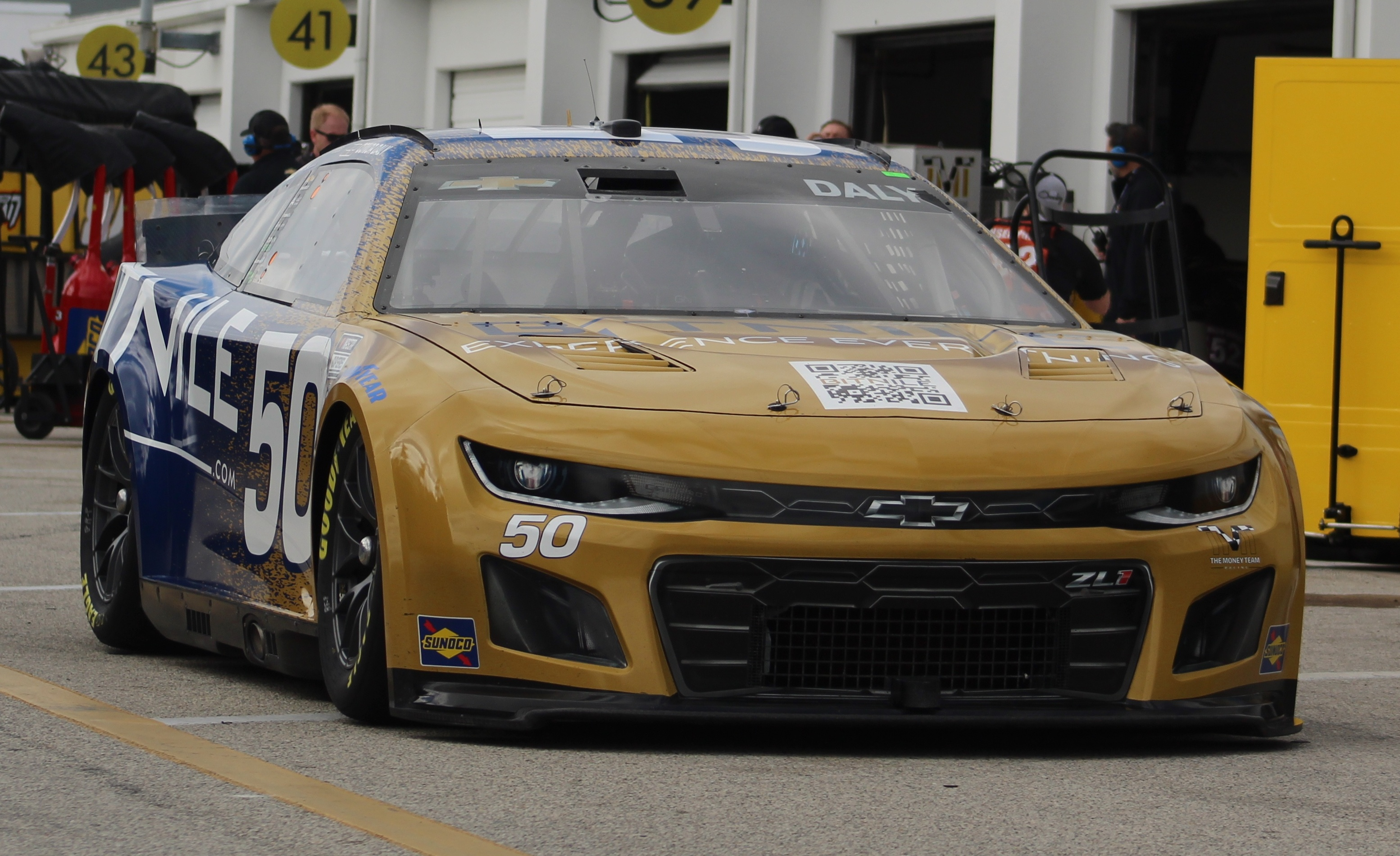
Daly's No. 50 car at Daytona International Speedway

In September 2022, Daly announced on Twitter that he would make his Cup Series debut for The Money Team Racing in the Charlotte race. On December 5, 2022, TMT co-owner Willy Auchmoody revealed in an interview with TobyChristie.com that Daly would return to the team to drive their No. 50 car part-time in the Cup Series in 2023.

Daly made the 2023 Daytona 500 starting lineup after finishing seventeenth in Duel 2 of the 2023 Bluegreen Vacations Duels, despite experiencing handling problems during the qualifying race. Daly became the 62nd driver to compete in both the Indy 500 and the Daytona 500. He finished 29th out of the 40 car field. By the time the race finished, Daly's No. 50 car completed 206 laps of the total 212 laps of the race.

== Personal life ==
Daly is the son of former Formula One, CART, and IMSA driver Derek Daly, and the stepson of Indianapolis Motor Speedway president Doug Boles.

Daly was diagnosed with Type 1 diabetes at age 14 in preparation for starting at Skip Barber School. He did not often speak publicly about his diagnosis until recently. Daly was sponsored by Lilly Diabetes in the 2016 and 2018 Indianapolis 500s and was going to again in his Xfinity start at Road America before the controversy involving his father Derek.

Daly appeared on the 30th season of The Amazing Race, teaming with fellow IndyCar driver Alexander Rossi where they finished in fourth place.

Daly co-hosts the motorsport podcast Speed Street with motorsport content creator Chase Holden. It is produced in partnership with Dirty Mo Media and features Daly and Holden interviewing drivers and industry figures across IndyCar and NASCAR, and other notable individuals, including Jaime Alguersuari, Milo Ventimiglia, and Danny Sullivan.

Daly's cousin, Nicola Daly, is an Ireland women's field hockey international and was a member of the squad that won the silver medal at the 2018 Women's Hockey World Cup. She also works as a data engineer for Juncos Racing.

== Racing record ==
=== Career summary ===
Season	Series	Team	Races	Wins	Poles	F/Lap	Podiums	Points	Position
2009	Star Mazda Championship	Andersen Racing	13	1	1	3	6	416	**3rd**
2010	Star Mazda Championship	Juncos Racing	13	7	9	7	12	539	**1st**
2011	GP3 Series	Carlin Motorsport	16	0	0	0	0	10	17th
2011	Indy Lights	Sam Schmidt Motorsports	5	1	1	2	2	145	13th
2012	GP3 Series	Lotus GP	16	1	0	0	5	106	6th
2012	Masters of Formula 3	Double R Racing	1	0	0	0	0	N/A	15th
2012	Formula One	Sahara Force India F1 Team	Test driver						
2012–13	MRF Challenge Formula 2000 Championship	MRF Racing	10	4	0	1	6	164	**1st**
2013	GP3 Series	ART Grand Prix	16	1	1	1	6	126	**3rd**
2013	GP2 Series	Hilmer Motorsport	2	0	0	0	0	2	26th
2013	IndyCar Series	A. J. Foyt Enterprises	1	0	0	0	0	11	34th
2013	Indy Lights	Team Moore Racing	1	0	0	0	1	35	13th
2014	GP2 Series	Venezuela GP Lazarus	18	0	0	0	0	2	26th
2014	United SportsCar Championship - PC	RSR Racing	1	0	0	0	0	1	57th
2015	United SportsCar Championship - PC	Performance Tech Motorsports	6	0	0	1	3	170	8th
2015	IndyCar Series	Schmidt Peterson Motorsports	4	0	0	0	0	81	28th
2015	IndyCar Series	Dale Coyne Racing	1	0	0	0	0	81	28th
2016	IndyCar Series	Dale Coyne Racing	16	0	0	0	1	313	18th
2017	IndyCar Series	A. J. Foyt Enterprises	17	0	0	0	0	305	18th
2017	WeatherTech SportsCar Championship - PC	Starworks Motorsport	1	0	0	0	0	28	22nd
2018	IndyCar Series	Dale Coyne Racing Thom Burns Racing	1	0	0	0	0	58	29th
2018	IndyCar Series	Harding Racing	3	0	0	0	0	58	29th
2018	NASCAR Xfinity Series	Roush Fenway Racing	1	0	0	N/A	N/A	6	77th
2019	IndyCar Series	Andretti Autosport	2	0	0	0	0	149	24th
2019	IndyCar Series	Carlin	4	0	0	0	0	149	24th
2019	IndyCar Series	Arrow Schmidt Peterson Motorsports	1	0	0	0	0	149	24th
2020	IndyCar Series	Carlin	5	0	1	1	0	237	17th
2020	IndyCar Series	Ed Carpenter Racing	9	0	0	0	0	237	17th
2020	NASCAR Gander RV & Outdoors Truck Series	Niece Motorsports	1	0	0	N/A	N/A	19	60th
2021	IndyCar Series	Carlin	3	0	0	0	0	235	18th
2021	IndyCar Series	Ed Carpenter Racing	13	0	0	0	0	235	18th
2021	NASCAR Camping World Truck Series	Niece Motorsports	1	0	0	N/A	N/A	1	91st
2022	IndyCar Series	Ed Carpenter Racing	17	0	0	1	0	267	17th
2022	NASCAR Cup Series	The Money Team Racing	1	0	0	N/A	N/A	3	40th
2023	IndyCar Series	Ed Carpenter Racing	7	0	0	0	0	134	25th
2023	IndyCar Series	Meyer Shank Racing	3	0	0	0	0	134	25th
2023	IndyCar Series	Rahal Letterman Lanigan Racing	1	0	0	0	0	134	25th
2023	NASCAR Cup Series	The Money Team Racing	2	0	0	N/A	N/A	9	58th
2023	NASCAR Xfinity Series	Alpha Prime Racing; Emerling-Gase Motorsports	1	0	0	N/A	N/A	0	103rd
2023	NASCAR Craftsman Truck Series	Niece Motorsports	1	0	0	N/A	N/A	19	61st
2023–24	Nitrocross Championship	Dreyer & Reinbold Racing	3	0	N/A	N/A	0	97	13th
2024	IndyCar Series	Dreyer & Reinbold Racing / Cusick Motorsports	1	0	0	0	0	119	26th
2024	IndyCar Series	Dale Coyne Racing	1	0	0	0	0	119	26th
2024	IndyCar Series	Juncos Hollinger Racing	5	0	0	0	1	119	26th
2024	GT World Challenge America - Pro	Random Vandals Racing	3	0	1	1	1	28	11th
2024	ARCA Menards Series	Rette Jones Racing	1	0	0	N/A	N/A	36	83rd
2024	NASCAR Xfinity Series	Sam Hunt Racing	1	0	0	N/A	N/A	23	63rd
2024	NASCAR Craftsman Truck Series	Niece Motorsports	3	0	0	N/A	N/A	0	86th
2025	IndyCar Series	Juncos Hollinger Racing	17	0	0	0	0	268	18th
2025	GT World Challenge America - Pro	Random Vandals Racing	1	0	0	0	0	0	NC
2026	IndyCar Series	Dreyer & Reinbold Racing	1	0	0	1	0	24	26th
2026	IndyCar Series	Juncos Hollinger Racing	Development driver						
2026	NASCAR Craftsman Truck Series	Kaulig Racing	3	0	0	0	N/A	39	51st

* Season still in progress.

=== American open-wheel racing results ===
(key)

==== Star Mazda Championship ====
Year	Team	1	2	3	4	5	6	7	8	9	10	11	12	13	Rank	Points
2009	Andersen Racing	SEB; 3	VIR; 5	MMP; 24	**NJ1**; 1	NJ2; 8	WIS; Ret	IOW; 2	ILL; 3	ILL; 5	QUE; 14	ONT; 2	ATL; 2	LAG; 4	3rd	416
2010	Juncos Racing	SEB; 3	**STP**; 1	**LAG**; 1	ORP; 1	**IOW**; 1	**NJ1**; 3	**NJ2**; 4	ACC; 3	**ACC**; 1	**TRO**; 3	**ROA**; 1	**MOS**; 1	ATL; 3	1st	539

==== Indy Lights ====
Year	Team	1	2	3	4	5	6	7	8	9	10	11	12	13	14	Rank	Points
2011	Sam Schmidt Motorsports	STP; 2	ALA; 11	LBH; 1	INDY	MIL	IOW	TOR	EDM1	EDM2	TRO; 13	NHM	**BAL**; 14	KTY	LVS	13th	145
2013	Team Moore Racing	STP	ALA	LBH	INDY	MIL	IOW	POC	TOR	MOH	BAL	HOU; 3	FON			13th	35

==== IndyCar Series ====
(key)

Year	Team	No.	Chassis	Engine	1	2	3	4	5	6	7	8	9	10	11	12	13	14	15	16	17	18	19	Rank	Points	Ref
2013	A. J. Foyt Enterprises	41	Dallara DW12	Honda	STP	ALA	LBH	SAO	INDY; 22	DET	DET	TXS	MIL	IOW	POC	TOR	TOR	MOH	SNM	BAL	HOU	HOU	FON	34th	11	
2015	Dale Coyne Racing	18	Dallara DW12	Honda	STP	NLA	LBH; 17	ALA	IMS															28th	81	
2015	Schmidt Peterson Motorsports	43	Dallara DW12	Honda						INDY; 33														28th	81	
2015	Schmidt Peterson Motorsports	5	Dallara DW12	Honda							DET; 19	DET; 6	TXS	TOR; 12	FON	MIL	IOW	MOH	POC	SNM				28th	81	
2016	Dale Coyne Racing	18	Dallara DW12	Honda	STP; 13	PHX; 16	LBH; 13	ALA; 20	IMS; 6	INDY; 29	DET; 2	DET; 6	RDA; 21	IOW; 21	TOR; 15	MOH; 6	TXS; 21		WGL; 4	SNM; 21				18th	313	
2016	Dale Coyne Racing	88	Dallara DW12	Honda														POC; 16						18th	313	
2017	A. J. Foyt Enterprises	4	Dallara DW12	Chevrolet	STP; 15	LBH; 16	ALA; 18	PHX; 14	IMS; 17	INDY; 30	DET; 22	DET; 12	TEX; 7	ROA; 15	IOW; 19	TOR; 17	MOH; 10	POC; 14	GTW; 5	WGL; 11	SNM; 10			18th	305	
2018	Dale Coyne Racing Thom Burns Racing	17	Dallara DW12	Honda	STP	PHX	LBH	ALA	IMS	INDY; 21	DET	DET	TXS	ROA	IOW									29th	58	
2018	Harding Racing	88	Dallara DW12	Chevrolet												TOR; 13	MOH; 22	POC; 15	GTW	POR	SNM			29th	58	
2019	Andretti Autosport	25	Dallara DW12	Honda	STP	COA	ALA	LBH	IMS	INDY; 10	DET	DET									LAG; 22			24th	149	
2019	Carlin	59	Dallara DW12	Chevrolet									TXS; 11	RDA	TOR	IOW; 13	MOH	POC; 11	GTW; 6					24th	149	
2019	Arrow Schmidt Peterson Motorsports	7	Dallara DW12	Honda																POR; 21				24th	149	
2020	Carlin	59	Dallara DW12	Chevrolet	TXS; 6				**IOW**; 8	IOW; 13		GTW; 10	GTW; 8											17th	237	
2020	Ed Carpenter Racing	20	Dallara DW12	Chevrolet		IMS; 12	ROA; 21	ROA; 18						MOH; 13	MOH; 16	IMS; 12	IMS; 20	STP; 17						17th	237	
2020	Ed Carpenter Racing	47	Dallara DW12	Chevrolet							INDY; 29													17th	237	
2021	Ed Carpenter Racing	47	Dallara DW12	Chevrolet						INDY; 13														18th	235	
2021	Ed Carpenter Racing	20	Dallara DW12	Chevrolet	ALA; 16	STP; 16			IMS; 25		DET; 13	DET; 15	ROA; 20	MOH; 15	NSH; 12	IMS; 11		POR; 16	LAG; 16	LBH; 21				18th	235	
2021	Carlin	59	Dallara DW12	Chevrolet			TXS; 21	TXS; 24									GTW; 11							18th	235	
2022	Ed Carpenter Racing	20	Dallara DW12	Chevrolet	STP; 21	TXS; 18	LBH; 12	ALA; 19	IMS; 5	INDY; 6	DET; 12	ROA; 14	MOH; 13	TOR; 20	IOW; 19	IOW; 16	IMS; 17	NSH; 17	GTW; 23	POR; 25	LAG; 24			17th	267	
2023	Ed Carpenter Racing	20	Dallara DW12	Chevrolet	STP; 14	TXS; 20	LBH; 23	ALA; 25	IMS; 19	INDY; 8	DET; 15	ROA												25th	134	
2023	Meyer Shank Racing	60	Dallara DW12	Honda									MOH; 20	TOR	IOW; 21	IOW; 17	NSH	IMS						25th	134	
2023	Rahal Letterman Lanigan Racing	30	Dallara DW12	Honda															GTW; 16	POR	LAG			25th	134	
2024	Dreyer & Reinbold Racing Cusick Motorsports	24	Dallara DW12	Chevrolet	STP	THE	LBH	ALA	IMS	INDY; 10	DET	ROA	LAG	MOH	IOW									26th	119	
2024	Dale Coyne Racing	18	Dallara DW12	Honda												IOW; 27	TOR							26th	119	
2024	Juncos Hollinger Racing	78	Dallara DW12	Chevrolet														GTW; 13	POR; 22	MIL; 3	MIL; 17	NSH; 10		26th	119	
2025	Juncos Hollinger Racing	76	Dallara DW12	Chevrolet	STP; 17	THE; 16	LBH; 25	ALA; 19	IMS; 15	INDY; 8	DET; 17	GTW; 6	ROA; 22	MOH; 19	IOW; 7	IOW; 16	TOR; 15	LAG; 14	POR; 26	MIL; 13	NSH; 5			18th	268	
2026	Dreyer & Reinbold Racing	23	Dallara DW12	Chevrolet	STP	PHX	ARL	ALA	LBH	IMS	INDY; 12	DET	GTW	ROA	MOH	NSH	POR	MRK	WSH	MIL	MIL	LAG		26th	24	

* Season still in progress.

==== Indianapolis 500 ====
Year	Chassis	Engine	Start	Finish	Team
2013	Dallara	Honda	31	22	A. J. Foyt Enterprises
2015	Dallara	Honda	23	33	Schmidt Peterson Motorsports
2016	Dallara	Honda	24	29	Dale Coyne Racing
2017	Dallara	Chevrolet	26	30	A. J. Foyt Enterprises
2018	Dallara	Honda	33	21	Dale Coyne Racing dba Thom Burns Racing
2019	Dallara	Honda	11	10	Andretti Autosport
2020	Dallara	Chevrolet	18	29	Ed Carpenter Racing
2021	Dallara	Chevrolet	19	13	Ed Carpenter Racing
2022	Dallara	Chevrolet	18	6	Ed Carpenter Racing
2023	Dallara	Chevrolet	16	8	Ed Carpenter Racing
2024	Dallara	Chevrolet	29	10	Dreyer & Reinbold Racing w/ Cusick Motorsports
2025	Dallara	Chevrolet	11	8	Juncos Hollinger Racing
2026	Dallara	Chevrolet	8	12	Dreyer & Reinbold Racing

- Daly did not start the 2015 Indianapolis 500 due to losing an engine during the pace laps.

=== Complete GP3 Series results ===
(key) (Races in bold indicate pole position) (Races in italics indicate fastest lap)

Year	Entrant	1	2	3	4	5	6	7	8	9	10	11	12	13	14	15	16	D.C.	Points
2011	Carlin Motorsport	IST; FEA; 21	IST; SPR; 25	CAT; FEA; 21	CAT; SPR; 22	VAL; FEA; 12	VAL; SPR; 7	SIL; FEA; 13	SIL; SPR; 7	NÜR; FEA; 6	NÜR; SPR; 8	HUN; FEA; 13	HUN; SPR; 11	SPA; FEA; 5	SPA; SPR; 7	MNZ; FEA; 6	MNZ; SPR; Ret	17th	10
2012	Lotus GP	CAT; FEA; 6	CAT; SPR; 1	MON; FEA; 23	MON; SPR; Ret	VAL; FEA; 11	VAL; SPR; Ret	SIL; FEA; 5	SIL; SPR; 2	HOC; FEA; 2	HOC; SPR; 3	HUN; FEA; 6	HUN; SPR; 9	SPA; FEA; 7	SPA; SPR; 3	MNZ; FEA; 4	MNZ; SPR; 11	6th	106
2013	ART Grand Prix	CAT; FEA; 3	CAT; SPR; 5	**VAL**; **FEA**; 1	VAL; SPR; 8	SIL; FEA; 22	SIL; SPR; Ret	NÜR; FEA; 10	NÜR; SPR; 9	HUN; FEA; 2	HUN; SPR; 8	SPA; FEA; 2	SPA; SPR; 2	MNZ; FEA; Ret	MNZ; SPR; 8	YMC; FEA; 4	YMC; SPR; 3	3rd	126

=== Complete GP2 Series results ===
(key) (Races in bold indicate pole position) (Races in italics indicate fastest lap)

Year	Entrant	1	2	3	4	5	6	7	8	9	10	11	12	13	14	15	16	17	18	19	20	21	22	DC	Points
2013	Hilmer Motorsport	SEP; FEA; 13	SEP; SPR; 7	BHR; FEA	BHR; SPR	CAT; FEA	CAT; SPR	MON; FEA	MON; SPR	SIL; FEA	SIL; SPR	HOC; FEA	HOC; SPR	HUN; FEA	HUN; SPR	SPA; FEA	SPA; SPR	MNZ; FEA	MNZ; SPR	MRN; FEA	MRN; SPR	YMC; FEA	YMC; SPR	26th	2
2014	Venezuela GP Lazarus	BHR; FEA; 12	BHR; SPR; Ret	CAT; FEA; 18	CAT; SPR; Ret	MON; FEA; 13	MON; SPR; 10	RBR; FEA; 18	RBR; SPR; 11	SIL; FEA; 14	SIL; SPR; 10	HOC; FEA; 21	HOC; SPR; 20	HUN; FEA; 13	HUN; SPR; 7	SPA; FEA; Ret	SPA; SPR; 19	MNZ; FEA	MNZ; SPR	SOC; FEA	SOC; SPR	YMC; FEA; 20	YMC; SPR; 15	26th	2

=== Complete IMSA SportsCar Championship results ===
(key)(Races in bold indicate pole position, Results are overall/class)

Year	Entrant	Class	Make	Engine	1	2	3	4	5	6	7	8	9	10	Rank	Points
2014	RSR Racing	PC	Oreca FLM09	Chevrolet LS3 6.2 L V8.	DAY; 8	SEB	LGA	KAN	WGL	IMS	ELK	VIR	COA	PET	57th	1
2015	Performance Tech Motorsports	PC	Oreca FLM09	Chevrolet LS3 6.2 L V8.	DAY	SEB; 3	LGA	DET	WGL; 7	MOS; 7	LIM; 7	ELK; 2	COA; 3	PET; DNS	8th	170
2017	Starworks Motorsport	PC	Oreca FLM09	Chevrolet LS3 6.2 L V8.	DAY; 4	SEB	COA	DET	WGL	MOS	ELK	PET			22nd	28

=== NASCAR ===
(key) (Bold – Pole position awarded by qualifying time. Italics – Pole position earned by points standings or practice time. * – Most laps led.)

==== Cup Series ====
NASCAR Cup Series results
Year	Team	No.	Make	1	2	3	4	5	6	7	8	9	10	11	12	13	14	15	16	17	18	19	20	21	22	23	24	25	26	27	28	29	30	31	32	33	34	35	36	NCSC	Pts	Ref
2022	The Money Team Racing	50	Chevy	DAY	CAL	LVS	PHO	ATL	COA	RCH	MAR	BRD	TAL	DOV	DAR	KAN	CLT	GTW	SON	NSH	ROA	ATL	NHA	POC	IRC	MCH	RCH	GLN	DAY	DAR	KAN	BRI	TEX	TAL	ROV; 34	LVS	HOM	MAR	PHO	40th	3	
2023	The Money Team Racing	50	Chevy	DAY; 29	CAL	LVS	PHO	ATL	COA; 36	RCH	BRD	MAR	TAL	DOV	KAN	DAR	CLT	GTW	SON	NSH	CSC	ATL	NHA	POC	RCH	MCH	IRC	GLN	DAY	DAR	KAN	BRI	TEX	TAL	ROV	LVS	HOM	MAR	PHO	58th	0^{1}	

===== Daytona 500 =====
Year	Team	Manufacturer	Start	Finish
2023	The Money Team Racing	Chevrolet	34	29

==== Xfinity Series ====
NASCAR Xfinity Series results
Year	Team	No.	Make	1	2	3	4	5	6	7	8	9	10	11	12	13	14	15	16	17	18	19	20	21	22	23	24	25	26	27	28	29	30	31	32	33	NXSC	Pts	Ref
2018	Roush Fenway Racing	6	Ford	DAY	ATL	LVS	PHO	CAL	TEX	BRI	RCH	TAL	DOV	CLT	POC	MCH	IOW	CHI	DAY	KEN	NHA	IOW	GLN	MOH	BRI	ROA; 31	DAR	IND	LVS	RCH	ROV	DOV	KAN	TEX	PHO	HOM	77th	6	
2023	Alpha Prime Racing	44	Chevy	DAY	CAL	LVS	PHO	ATL	COA	RCH	MAR	TAL	DOV	DAR	CLT	PIR	SON	NSH	CSC	ATL	NHA	POC	ROA	MCH	IRC; DNQ	GLN	DAY	DAR	KAN	BRI	TEX						103rd	0^{1}	
2023	Emerling-Gase Motorsports	53	Chevy																													ROV; 35	LVS	HOM	MAR	PHO	103rd	0^{1}	
2024	Sam Hunt Racing	26	Toyota	DAY	ATL	LVS	PHO	COA	RCH	MAR	TEX	TAL	DOV	DAR	CLT	PIR	SON	IOW	NHA	NSH	CSC	POC	IND; 14	MCH	DAY	DAR	ATL	GLN	BRI	KAN	TAL	ROV	LVS	HOM	MAR	PHO	63rd	23	

==== Craftsman Truck Series ====
NASCAR Craftsman Truck Series results
Year	Team	No.	Make	1	2	3	4	5	6	7	8	9	10	11	12	13	14	15	16	17	18	19	20	21	22	23	24	25	NCTC	Pts	Ref
2020	Niece Motorsports	42	Chevy	DAY	LVS	CLT	ATL	HOM	POC	KEN	TEX	KAN	KAN	MCH	DRC	DOV	GTW	DAR	RCH	BRI	LVS; 18	TAL	KAN	TEX	MAR	PHO			60th	19	
2021	Niece Motorsports	44	Chevy	DAY	DRC	LVS; 40	ATL	BRD	RCH	KAN	DAR	COA	CLT	TEX	NSH	POC	KNX	GLN	GTW	DAR	BRI	LVS	TAL	MAR	PHO				91st	1	
2023	Niece Motorsports	41	Chevy	DAY	LVS	ATL	COA	TEX	BRD	MAR	KAN	DAR	NWS	CLT	GTW	NSH	MOH; 18	POC	RCH	IRP	MLW	KAN	BRI	TAL	HOM	PHO			61st	19	
2024	Niece Motorsports	44	Chevy	DAY	ATL	LVS	BRI	COA	MAR	TEX	KAN	DAR	NWS	CLT	GTW	NSH	POC	IRP; 29	RCH	MLW	BRI	KAN; 17	TAL	HOM; 28	MAR	PHO			86th	0^{1}	
2026	Kaulig Racing	25	Ram	DAY	ATL	STP	DAR	CAR	BRI	TEX	GLN	DOV	CLT	NSH	MCH	COR	LRP	NWS	IRP; 26	RCH	NHA	BRI	KAN; 16	CLT	PHO; 30	TAL	MAR	HOM	51st	39	

^{*} Season still in progress
^{1} Ineligible for series points

=== ARCA Menards Series ===
(key) (Bold – Pole position awarded by qualifying time. Italics – Pole position earned by points standings or practice time. * – Most laps led.)

ARCA Menards Series results
Year	Team	No.	Make	1	2	3	4	5	6	7	8	9	10	11	12	13	14	15	16	17	18	19	20	AMSC	Pts	Ref
2024	Rette Jones Racing	30	Ford	DAY	PHO	TAL	DOV	KAN	CLT	IOW	MOH; 8	BLN	IRP	SLM	ELK	MCH	ISF	MLW	DSF	GLN	BRI	KAN	TOL	83rd	36	

=== Nitrocross ===
==== Group E ====
Year	Team	Car	1	2	3	4	5	6	7	8	9	10	Rank	Points
2023–24	Dreyer & Reinbold Racing	FC1-X	MID	UMC		WHP		GHR		CAL	LAS		**13th**	**97**
2023–24	Dreyer & Reinbold Racing	FC1-X	8	5	11								**13th**	**97**

Sporting positions
Preceded by Adam Christodoulou	Star Mazda Championship; Champion; 2010	Succeeded by Tristan Vautier
Preceded by Inaugural	MRF Challenge Formula 2000; Champion; 2012–13	Succeeded by Rupert Svendsen-Cook
