= 2021 Honda Indy Grand Prix of Alabama =

First round of the 2021 IndyCar Series

(United States) 2021 Honda Indy Grand Prix of Alabama
Race details
1st round of the 2021 IndyCar season
Next race →
- Date: April 18, 2021
- Official name: Honda Indy Grand Prix of Alabama presented by AmFirst
- Location: Barber Motorsports Park, Birmingham, Alabama
- Course: Permanent racing facility 2.380 mi / 3.830 km
- Distance: 90 laps 214.200 mi / 344.700 km

Pole position
- Driver: (Mexico) Patricio O'Ward (Arrow McLaren SP)
- Time: 01:05.8479

Fastest lap
- Driver: (Mexico) Patricio O'Ward (Arrow McLaren SP)
- Time: 01:06.8182 (on lap 65 of 90)

Podium
- First: (Spain) Álex Palou (Chip Ganassi Racing)
- Second: (Australia) Will Power (Team Penske)
- Third: (New Zealand) Scott Dixon (Chip Ganassi Racing)

The 2021 Honda Indy Grand Prix of Alabama (officially known as the 2021 Honda Indy Grand Prix of Alabama presented by AmFirst) was an IndyCar Series auto racing event held on April 18, 2021 at Barber Motorsports Park in Birmingham, Alabama. It served as the season opener of the 2021 IndyCar Series and was the eleventh running of the Honda Indy Grand Prix of Alabama.

Álex Palou won the race for Chip Ganassi Racing, scoring his first career victory in his second season. Team Penske's Will Power finished second, with defending IndyCar champion Scott Dixon rounding out the podium places in third.

== Background ==
The event was initially scheduled to be held on April 11, 2021, after the Firestone Grand Prix of St. Petersburg, which was slated to be held on March 7 to become the season opener. However, the St. Petersburg race was rescheduled to April 25, making the Barber race the first round of the 2021 season. The event was then rescheduled from April 11 to be held on the weekend of April 17–18, a week prior to the St. Petersburg race. It marked the return of the event to the calendar, after being canceled in the previous season due to the COVID-19 pandemic.

Takuma Sato was the previous race winner, having won the race in 2019 for Rahal Letterman Lanigan Racing.

=== Entrants ===
24 drivers entered the race, including IndyCar Series debutants Jimmie Johnson (Chip Ganassi Racing) and Romain Grosjean (Dale Coyne Racing with Rick Ware Racing), with Scott McLaughlin (Team Penske) making his second career start after racing the season finale in 2020.

| Key | Meaning |
|---|---|
| R | Rookie |
| W | Past winner |

| No. | Driver | Team | Engine |
|---|---|---|---|
| 2 | (United States) Josef Newgarden W | Team Penske | Chevrolet |
| 3 | (New Zealand) Scott McLaughlin R | Team Penske | Chevrolet |
| 4 | (Canada) Dalton Kellett | A. J. Foyt Enterprises | Chevrolet |
| 5 | (Mexico) Patricio O'Ward | Arrow McLaren SP | Chevrolet |
| 7 | (Sweden) Felix Rosenqvist | Arrow McLaren SP | Chevrolet |
| 8 | (Sweden) Marcus Ericsson | Chip Ganassi Racing | Honda |
| 9 | (New Zealand) Scott Dixon | Chip Ganassi Racing | Honda |
| 10 | (Spain) Álex Palou | Chip Ganassi Racing | Honda |
| 12 | (Australia) Will Power W | Team Penske | Chevrolet |
| 14 | (France) Sébastien Bourdais | A. J. Foyt Enterprises | Chevrolet |
| 15 | (United States) Graham Rahal | Rahal Letterman Lanigan Racing | Honda |
| 18 | (United Arab Emirates) Ed Jones | Dale Coyne Racing with Vasser-Sullivan | Honda |
| 20 | (United States) Conor Daly | Ed Carpenter Racing | Chevrolet |
| 21 | (Netherlands) Rinus VeeKay | Ed Carpenter Racing | Chevrolet |
| 22 | (France) Simon Pagenaud W | Team Penske | Chevrolet |
| 26 | (United States) Colton Herta | Andretti Autosport | Honda |
| 27 | (United States) Alexander Rossi | Andretti Autosport | Honda |
| 28 | (United States) Ryan Hunter-Reay W | Andretti Autosport | Honda |
| 29 | (Canada) James Hinchcliffe | Andretti Steinbrenner Autosport | Honda |
| 30 | (Japan) Takuma Sato W | Rahal Letterman Lanigan Racing | Honda |
| 48 | (United States) Jimmie Johnson R | Chip Ganassi Racing | Honda |
| 51 | (France) Romain Grosjean R | Dale Coyne Racing with Rick Ware Racing | Honda |
| 59 | (United Kingdom) Max Chilton | Carlin | Chevrolet |
| 60 | (United Kingdom) Jack Harvey | Meyer Shank Racing | Honda |

== Practice ==
=== Practice 1 ===
Practice 1 took place at 11:00 AM ET on April 17, 2021. A single red flag was called in the session, when Felix Rosenqvist made contact with the barrier while entering pit road. Álex Palou went fastest in the first practice session of the season with a time of 01:06.4721, ahead of Colton Herta and Josef Newgarden in second and third respectively.

Top Practice Speeds
| Pos | No. | Driver | Team | Engine | Lap Time |
|---|---|---|---|---|---|
| 1 | 10 | (Spain) Álex Palou | Chip Ganassi Racing | Honda | 01:06.4721 |
| 2 | 26 | (United States) Colton Herta | Andretti Autosport | Honda | 01:06.4897 |
| 3 | 2 | (United States) Josef Newgarden W | Team Penske | Chevrolet | 01:06.4957 |

=== Practice 2 ===
Practice 2 took place at 2:40 PM ET on April 17, 2021. The session saw multiple red flags for incidents involving a stall for Dalton Kellett, contact with the Turn 14 wall for Herta, and Newgarden losing power after correcting a slide. Andretti Autosport driver Alexander Rossi finished first in the second practice session with a time of 01:06.0797, ahead of Chip Ganassi Racing duo Marcus Ericsson and Scott Dixon.

Top Practice Speeds
| Pos | No. | Driver | Team | Engine | Lap Time |
|---|---|---|---|---|---|
| 1 | 27 | (United States) Alexander Rossi | Andretti Autosport | Honda | 01:06.0797 |
| 2 | 8 | (Sweden) Marcus Ericsson | Chip Ganassi Racing | Honda | 01:06.2190 |
| 3 | 9 | (New Zealand) Scott Dixon | Chip Ganassi Racing | Honda | 01:06.3018 |

== Qualifying ==
Qualifying took place at 5:50 PM ET on April 17, 2021.

=== Qualifying classification ===
| Pos | No. | Driver | Team | Engine | Time | | | | Final grid |
| Pos | No. | Driver | Team | Engine | Round 1 | | Round 2 | Round 3 | Final grid |
| Pos | No. | Driver | Team | Engine | Group 1 | Group 2 | Round 2 | Round 3 | Final grid |
|---|---|---|---|---|---|---|---|---|---|
| 1 | 5 | (Mexico) Pato O'Ward | Arrow McLaren SP | Chevrolet | N/A | **01:06.0696** | **01:05.5019** | **01:05.8479** | 1 |
| 2 | 27 | (United States) Alexander Rossi | Andretti Autosport | Honda | N/A | 01:06.2344 | 01:05.6953 | 01:05.9177 | 2 |
| 3 | 10 | (Spain) Álex Palou | Chip Ganassi Racing | Honda | **01:05.9032** | N/A | 01:05.6328 | 01:06.0538 | 3 |
| 4 | 2 | (Australia) Will Power **W** | Team Penske | Chevrolet | 01:05.9191 | N/A | 01:05.5226 | 01:06.1186 | 4 |
| 5 | 9 | (New Zealand) Scott Dixon | Chip Ganassi Racing | Honda | N/A | 01:06.3775 | 01:05.6863 | 01:06.3976 | 5 |
| 6 | 8 | (Sweden) Marcus Ericsson | Chip Ganassi Racing | Honda | 01:06.4992 | N/A | 01:05.6614 | 01:06.4102 | 6 |
| 7 | 51 | (France) Romain Grosjean **R** | Dale Coyne Racing with Rick Ware Racing | Honda | N/A | 01:06.0709 | 01:05.7643 | N/A | 7 |
| 8 | 2 | (United States) Josef Newgarden **W** | Team Penske | Chevrolet | 01:06.3881 | N/A | 01:05.7902 | N/A | 8 |
| 9 | 26 | (United States) Colton Herta | Andretti Autosport | Honda | N/A | 01:06.4282 | 01:05.7957 | N/A | 9 |
| 10 | 20 | (United States) Conor Daly | Ed Carpenter Racing | Chevrolet | N/A | 01:06.1033 | 01:05.9118 | N/A | 10 |
| 11 | 60 | (United Kingdom) Jack Harvey | Meyer Shank Racing | Honda | 01:06.5234 | N/A | 01:05.9634 | N/A | 11 |
| 12 | 3 | (New Zealand) Scott McLaughlin **R** | Team Penske | Chevrolet | 01:06.4552 | N/A | 01:06.7226 | N/A | 12 |
| 13 | 18 | (United Arab Emirates) Ed Jones | Dale Coyne Racing with Vasser-Sullivan | Honda | 01:06.5578 | N/A | N/A | N/A | 13 |
| 14 | 21 | (Netherlands) Rinus VeeKay | Ed Carpenter Racing | Chevrolet | N/A | 01:06.4770 | N/A | N/A | 14 |
| 15 | 22 | (France) Simon Pagenaud **W** | Team Penske | Chevrolet | 01:06.6480 | N/A | N/A | N/A | 15 |
| 16 | 14 | (France) Sébastien Bourdais | A. J. Foyt Enterprises | Chevrolet | N/A | 01:06.5035 | N/A | N/A | 16 |
| 17 | 28 | (United States) Ryan Hunter-Reay **W** | Andretti Autosport | Honda | 01:06.8512 | N/A | N/A | N/A | 17 |
| 18 | 15 | (United States) Graham Rahal | Rahal Letterman Lanigan Racing | Honda | N/A | 01:06.8489 | N/A | N/A | 18 |
| 19 | 30 | (Japan) Takuma Sato **W** | Rahal Letterman Lanigan Racing | Honda | 01:07.1026 | N/A | N/A | N/A | 19 |
| 20 | 59 | (United Kingdom) Max Chilton | Carlin | Chevrolet | N/A | 01:07.0021 | N/A | N/A | 20 |
| 21 | 48 | (United States) Jimmie Johnson **R** | Chip Ganassi Racing | Honda | 01:07.7092 | N/A | N/A | N/A | 21 |
| 22 | 7 | (Sweden) Felix Rosenqvist | Arrow McLaren SP | Chevrolet | N/A | 01:07.0254 | N/A | N/A | 22 |
| 23 | 4 | (Canada) Dalton Kellett | A. J. Foyt Enterprises | Chevrolet | 01:07.8100 | N/A | N/A | N/A | 22 |
| 24 | 29 | (Canada) James Hinchcliffe | Andretti Steinbrenner Autosport | Honda | N/A | No Time | N/A | N/A | 24 |

Notes

- **Bold text** indicates fastest time set in session.

== Warmup ==
Warmup took place at 11:30 AM ET on April 18, 2021.

Top Warmup Speeds
| Pos | No. | Driver | Team | Engine | Lap Time |
|---|---|---|---|---|---|
| 1 | 15 | (United States) Graham Rahal | Rahal Letterman Lanigan Racing | Honda | 01:06.7319 |
| 2 | 51 | (France) Romain Grosjean R | Dale Coyne Racing with Rick Ware Racing | Honda | 01:06.8616 |
| 3 | 14 | (France) Sébastien Bourdais | A. J. Foyt Enterprises | Chevrolet | 01:06.8642 |

== Race ==
The race started at 3:00 PM ET on April 18, 2021.

=== Race classification ===
| Pos | No. | Driver | Team | Engine | Laps | Time/Retired | Pit Stops | Grid | Laps Led | Pts. |
|---|---|---|---|---|---|---|---|---|---|---|
| 1 | 10 | (Spain) Álex Palou | Chip Ganassi Racing | Honda | 90 | 1:52:53.0361 | 2 | 3 | 56 | 53 |
| 2 | 12 | (Australia) Will Power W | Team Penske | Chevrolet | 90 | +0.4016 | 2 | 4 | 4 | 41 |
| 3 | 9 | (New Zealand) Scott Dixon | Chip Ganassi Racing | Honda | 90 | +2.9881 | 2 | 5 | | 35 |
| 4 | 5 | (Mexico) Pato O'Ward | Arrow McLaren SP | Chevrolet | 90 | +3.9741 | 3 | 1 | 25 | 34 |
| 5 | 14 | (France) Sébastien Bourdais | A. J. Foyt Enterprises | Chevrolet | 90 | +10.6967 | 3 | 16 | 4 | 31 |
| 6 | 21 | (Netherlands) Rinus VeeKay | Ed Carpenter Racing | Chevrolet | 90 | +13.8750 | 4 | 14 | 1 | 29 |
| 7 | 15 | (United States) Graham Rahal | Rahal Letterman Lanigan Racing | Honda | 90 | +18.7387 | 3 | 18 | | 26 |
| 8 | 8 | (Sweden) Marcus Ericsson | Chip Ganassi Racing | Honda | 90 | +20.0700 | 2 | 6 | | 24 |
| 9 | 27 | (United States) Alexander Rossi | Andretti Autosport | Honda | 90 | +20.5601 | 3 | 2 | | 22 |
| 10 | 51 | (France) Romain Grosjean R | Dale Coyne Racing with Rick Ware Racing | Honda | 90 | +45.0805 | 2 | 7 | | 20 |
| 11 | 60 | (United Kingdom) Jack Harvey | Meyer Shank Racing | Honda | 90 | +50.0788 | 3 | 11 | | 19 |
| 12 | 22 | (France) Simon Pagenaud W | Team Penske | Chevrolet | 90 | +59.0522 | 3 | 15 | | 18 |
| 13 | 30 | (Japan) Takuma Sato W | Rahal Letterman Lanigan Racing | Honda | 90 | +1:05.5887 | 3 | 19 | | 17 |
| 14 | 3 | (New Zealand) Scott McLaughlin R | Team Penske | Chevrolet | 90 | +1:06.0562 | 3 | 12 | | 16 |
| 15 | 18 | (United Arab Emirates) Ed Jones | Dale Coyne Racing with Vasser-Sullivan | Honda | 90 | +1:08.4093 | 3 | 13 | | 15 |
| 16 | 20 | (United States) Conor Daly | Ed Carpenter Racing | Chevrolet | 90 | +1:09.1076 | 3 | 10 | | 14 |
| 17 | 29 | (Canada) James Hinchcliffe | Andretti Steinbrenner Autosport | Honda | 89 | +1 Lap | 3 | 24 | | 13 |
| 18 | 4 | (Canada) Dalton Kellett | A. J. Foyt Enterprises | Chevrolet | 89 | +1 Lap | 4 | 23 | | 12 |
| 19 | 48 | (United States) Jimmie Johnson R | Chip Ganassi Racing | Honda | 87 | +3 Laps | 3 | 21 | | 11 |
| 20 | 59 | (United Kingdom) Max Chilton | Carlin | Chevrolet | 86 | +4 Laps | 4 | 20 | | 10 |
| 21 | 7 | (Sweden) Felix Rosenqvist | Arrow McLaren SP | Chevrolet | 62 | Contact | 3 | 22 | | 9 |
| 22 | 26 | (United States) Colton Herta | Andretti Autosport | Honda | 25 | Contact | 2 | 9 | | 8 |
| 23 | 2 | (United States) Josef Newgarden W | Team Penske | Chevrolet | 0 | Contact | 0 | 8 | | 7 |
| 24 | 28 | (United States) Ryan Hunter-Reay W | Andretti Autosport | Honda | 0 | Contact | 0 | 17 | | 6 |
Fastest lap: (Mexico) Pato O'Ward (Arrow McLaren SP) – 01:06.8182 (lap 65)

== Championship standings after the race ==
Drivers' Championship standings

| Pos. | Driver | Points |
|---|---|---|
| 1 | (Spain) Álex Palou | 53 |
| 2 | (Australia) Will Power | 41 |
| 3 | (New Zealand) Scott Dixon | 35 |
| 4 | (Mexico) Pato O'Ward | 34 |
| 5 | (France) Sébastien Bourdais | 31 |

Engine manufacturer standings

| Pos. | Manufacturer | Points |
|---|---|---|
| 1 | Honda | 90 |
| 2 | Chevrolet | 73 |

- Note: Only the top five positions are included.

| Previous race: None, season premiere | IndyCar Series; 2021 season | Next race: 2021 Firestone Grand Prix of St. Petersburg |
| Previous race: 2019 Honda Indy Grand Prix of Alabama | Indy Grand Prix of Alabama | Next race: 2022 Honda Indy Grand Prix of Alabama |
