= 2025 Chevrolet Detroit Grand Prix =

Indycar race held in Detroit, Michigan

(United States) 2025 Chevrolet Detroit Grand Prix
Race details
7th round of the 2025 IndyCar season
← Previous race	Next race →
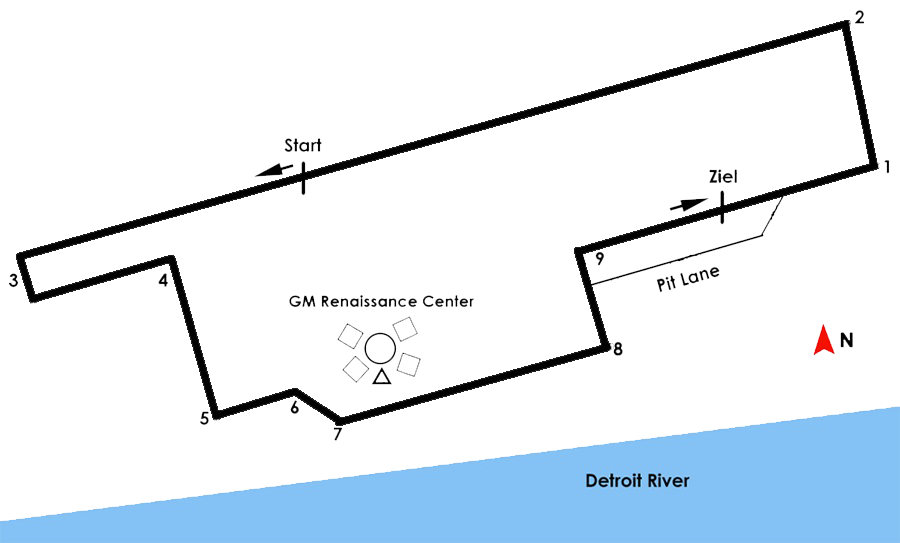
- Layout of the Detroit street circuit
- Date: June 1, 2025
- Official name: Chevrolet Detroit Grand Prix
- Location: Detroit street circuit, Detroit, Michigan
- Course: Temporary street circuit 1.645 mi / 2.647 km
- Distance: 100 laps 164.500 mi / 264.737 km
- Weather: Clear 18 °C (64 °F)

Pole position
- Driver: (United States) Colton Herta (Andretti Global with Curb-Agajanian)
- Time: 01:00.4779

Fastest lap
- Driver: (Cayman Islands) Kyffin Simpson (Chip Ganassi Racing)
- Time: 01.02.2421 (on lap 54 of 100)

Podium
- First: (United States) Kyle Kirkwood (Andretti Global)
- Second: (United States) Santino Ferrucci (A.J. Foyt Enterprises)
- Third: (United States) Colton Herta (Andretti Global with Curb-Agajanian)

Chronology
Previous	Next
2024	2026

The 2025 Chevrolet Detroit Grand Prix was the seventh round of the 2025 IndyCar season. The race was held on June 1, 2025, in Detroit, Michigan at the Detroit street circuit. The race was contested of 100 laps. Kyle Kirkwood won the race, Santino Ferrucci finished 2nd, and Colton Herta finished 3rd. Will Power and Kyffin Simpson rounded out the top five, while Marcus Armstrong, Pato O'Ward, Christian Lundgaard, Josef Newgarden, and Alexander Rossi rounded out the top ten.

== Entry list ==
Key	Meaning
R	Rookie
W	Past winner

No.	Driver	Team	Engine
2	(United States) Josef Newgarden W	Team Penske	Chevrolet
3	(New Zealand) Scott McLaughlin	Team Penske	Chevrolet
4	(United States) David Malukas	A.J. Foyt Enterprises	Chevrolet
5	(Mexico) Pato O'Ward W	Arrow McLaren	Chevrolet
6	(United States) Nolan Siegel R	Arrow McLaren	Chevrolet
7	(Denmark) Christian Lundgaard	Arrow McLaren	Chevrolet
8	(Cayman Islands) Kyffin Simpson	Chip Ganassi Racing	Honda
9	(New Zealand) Scott Dixon W	Chip Ganassi Racing	Honda
10	(Spain) Álex Palou W	Chip Ganassi Racing	Honda
12	(Australia) Will Power W	Team Penske	Chevrolet
14	(United States) Santino Ferrucci	A.J. Foyt Enterprises	Chevrolet
15	(United States) Graham Rahal W	Rahal Letterman Lanigan Racing	Honda
18	(Netherlands) Rinus VeeKay	Dale Coyne Racing	Honda
20	(United States) Alexander Rossi	Ed Carpenter Racing	Chevrolet
21	(Denmark) Christian Rasmussen	Ed Carpenter Racing	Chevrolet
26	(United States) Colton Herta	Andretti Global with Curb-Agajanian	Honda
27	(United States) Kyle Kirkwood	Andretti Global	Honda
28	(Sweden) Marcus Ericsson W	Andretti Global	Honda
30	(Canada) Devlin DeFrancesco	Rahal Letterman Lanigan Racing	Honda
45	(United Kingdom) Louis Foster R	Rahal Letterman Lanigan Racing	Honda
51	(United States) Jacob Abel R	Dale Coyne Racing	Honda
60	(Sweden) Felix Rosenqvist	Meyer Shank Racing with Curb-Agajanian	Honda
66	(New Zealand) Marcus Armstrong	Meyer Shank Racing with Curb-Agajanian	Honda
76	(United States) Conor Daly	Juncos Hollinger Racing	Chevrolet
77	(United States) Sting Ray Robb	Juncos Hollinger Racing	Chevrolet
83	(Israel) Robert Shwartzman R	PREMA Racing	Chevrolet
90	(United Kingdom) Callum Ilott	PREMA Racing	Chevrolet

== Practice ==
=== Practice 1 ===
Top Practice Speeds
Pos	No.	Driver	Team	Engine	Lap Time
1	27	(United States) Kyle Kirkwood	Andretti Global	Honda	01:01.7509
2	3	(New Zealand) Scott McLaughlin	Team Penske	Chevrolet	01:02.0301
3	12	(Australia) Will Power W	Team Penske	Chevrolet	01:02.3862
Practice 1 results

=== Practice 2 ===
Top Practice Speeds
Pos	No.	Driver	Team	Engine	Lap Time
1	26	(United States) Colton Herta	Andretti Global with Curb-Agajanian	Honda	01:01.7823
2	3	(New Zealand) Scott McLaughlin	Team Penske	Chevrolet	01:01.8995
3	27	(United States) Kyle Kirkwood	Andretti Global	Honda	01:01.9423
Practice 2 results

== Qualifying ==
Qualifying was held on May 31, 2025, at 12:00 PM ET.

=== Qualifying classification ===
Pos	No.	Driver	Team	Engine	Time	Final grid
1	26	(United States) Colton Herta	Andretti Global with Curb-Agajanian	Honda	01:00.4779	1
2	4	(United States) David Malukas	A.J. Foyt Enterprises	Chevrolet	01:00.6492	2
3	27	(United States) Kyle Kirkwood	Andretti Global	Honda	01:00.7312	3
4	7	(Denmark) Christian Lundgaard	Arrow McLaren	Chevrolet	01:00.8938	4
5	15	(United States) Graham Rahal W	Rahal Letterman Lanigan Racing	Honda	01:01.0651	5
6	10	(Spain) Álex Palou W	Chip Ganassi Racing	Honda	01:01.4680	6
7	18	(Netherlands) Rinus VeeKay	Dale Coyne Racing	Honda	01:00.7208	7
8	3	(New Zealand) Scott McLaughlin	Team Penske	Chevrolet	01:00.7599	8
9	12	(Australia) Will Power W	Team Penske	Chevrolet	01:00.7857	9
10	9	(New Zealand) Scott Dixon W	Chip Ganassi Racing	Honda	01:01.1595	10
11	66	(New Zealand) Marcus Armstrong	Meyer Shank Racing with Curb-Agajanian	Honda	01:01.2434	11
12	21	(Denmark) Christian Rasmussen	Ed Carpenter Racing	Chevrolet	01:01.5312	12
13	28	(Sweden) Marcus Ericsson W	Andretti Global	Honda	01:01.3816	13
14	45	(United Kingdom) Louis Foster R	Rahal Letterman Lanigan Racing	Honda	01:01.2089	14
15	60	(Sweden) Felix Rosenqvist	Meyer Shank Racing with Curb-Agajanian	Honda	01:01.4149	15
16	20	(United States) Alexander Rossi	Ed Carpenter Racing	Chevrolet	01:01.4307	16
17	90	(United Kingdom) Callum Ilott	PREMA Racing	Chevrolet	01:01.4637	17
18	5	(Mexico) Pato O'Ward W	Arrow McLaren	Chevrolet	01:01.6819	18
19	8	(Cayman Islands) Kyffin Simpson	Chip Ganassi Racing	Honda	01:01.5558	19
20	51	(United States) Jacob Abel R	Dale Coyne Racing	Honda	01:01.7311	20
21	14	(United States) Santino Ferrucci	A.J. Foyt Enterprises	Chevrolet	01:01.5797	21
22	83	(Israel) Robert Shwartzman R	PREMA Racing	Chevrolet	01:01.8499	22
23	30	(Canada) Devlin DeFrancesco	Rahal Letterman Lanigan Racing	Honda	01:01.6040	23
24	2	(United States) Josef Newgarden W	Team Penske	Chevrolet	01:02.2055	24
25	76	(United States) Conor Daly	Juncos Hollinger Racing	Chevrolet	01:02.1682	25
26	77	(United States) Sting Ray Robb	Juncos Hollinger Racing	Chevrolet	01:02.4053	26
27	6	(United States) Nolan Siegel R	Arrow McLaren	Chevrolet	01:08.3196	27
Full qualifying results

Notes

- **Bold text** indicates fastest time.

== Warmup ==
Top Practice Speeds
Pos	No.	Driver	Team	Engine	Lap Time
1	60	(Sweden) Felix Rosenqvist	Meyer Shank Racing with Curb-Agajanian	Honda	01:02.1054
2	27	(United States) Kyle Kirkwood	Andretti Global	Honda	01:02.3447
3	4	(United States) David Malukas	A.J. Foyt Enterprises	Chevrolet	01:02.5052
Official warmup results

== Race ==
The race was held on June 1, 2025, at 12:30 PM ET.

=== Race classification ===
Pos	No.	Driver	Team	Engine	Laps	Time/Retired	Pit Stops	Grid	Laps Led	Pts.
1	27	(United States) Kyle Kirkwood	Andretti Global	Honda	100	02:00:20.0264	4	3	48	53
2	14	(United States) Santino Ferrucci	A.J. Foyt Enterprises	Chevrolet	100	02:00:23.6195	4	21	8	15 (Note: Santino Ferrucci and the #14 A. J. Foyt Racing entry received a 25-point penalty and a $25,000 fine, as well as lost a lap led bonus point and were rendered ineligible for engine manufacturer points, at the Detroit Grand Prix for incorrect driver equivalency weight.)
3	26	(United States) Colton Herta	Andretti Global with Curb-Agajanian	Honda	100	02:00:24.9691	4	1	11	37
4	12	(Australia) Will Power W	Team Penske	Chevrolet	100	02:00:25.4752	4	9	1	33
5	8	(Cayman Islands) Kyffin Simpson	Chip Ganassi Racing	Honda	100	02:00:26.2453	4	19	0	30
6	66	(New Zealand) Marcus Armstrong	Meyer Shank Racing with Curb-Agajanian	Honda	100	02:00:28.5501	5	11	0	28
7	5	(Mexico) Pato O'Ward W	Arrow McLaren	Chevrolet	100	02:00:29.1947	4	18	3	27
8	7	(Denmark) Christian Lundgaard	Arrow McLaren	Chevrolet	100	02:00:29.8087	4	4	0	24
9	2	(United States) Josef Newgarden W	Team Penske	Chevrolet	100	02:00:38.7955	3	24	0	22
10	20	(United States) Alexander Rossi	Ed Carpenter Racing	Chevrolet	100	02:00:39.4756	4	16	0	20
11	9	(New Zealand) Scott Dixon W	Chip Ganassi Racing	Honda	100	02:00:39.9695	4	10	2	20
12	3	(New Zealand) Scott McLaughlin	Team Penske	Chevrolet	100	02:00:40.4436	5	8	3	19
13	28	(Sweden) Marcus Ericsson W	Andretti Global	Honda	100	02:00:40.8252	4	13	0	17
14	4	(United States) David Malukas	A.J. Foyt Enterprises	Chevrolet	100	02:00:41.5433	5	2	0	16
15	77	(United States) Sting Ray Robb	Juncos Hollinger Racing	Chevrolet	100	02:00:42.1975	4	26	0	15
16	83	(Israel) Robert Shwartzman R	PREMA Racing	Chevrolet	100	02:00:49.0839	4	22	0	14
17	76	(United States) Conor Daly	Juncos Hollinger Racing	Chevrolet	100	02:00:53.6905	4	25	0	13
18	51	(United States) Jacob Abel R	Dale Coyne Racing	Honda	100	02:01:08.9444	6	20	0	12
19	6	(United States) Nolan Siegel R	Arrow McLaren	Chevrolet	98	02:01:03.4727	7	27	0	11
20	15	(United States) Graham Rahal W	Rahal Letterman Lanigan Racing	Honda	97	02:01:03.4727	5	5	0	10
21	60	(Sweden) Felix Rosenqvist	Meyer Shank Racing with Curb-Agajanian	Honda	83	Contact	5	15	2	10
22	45	(United Kingdom) Louis Foster R	Rahal Letterman Lanigan Racing	Honda	83	Contact	3	14	1	9
23	30	(Canada) Devlin DeFrancesco	Rahal Letterman Lanigan Racing	Honda	83	Mechanical	7	23	0	7
24	21	(Denmark) Christian Rasmussen	Ed Carpenter Racing	Chevrolet	80	Mechanical	3	12	21	7
25	10	(Spain) Álex Palou W	Chip Ganassi Racing	Honda	72	Contact	3	6	0	5
26	90	(United Kingdom) Callum Ilott	PREMA Racing	Chevrolet	66	Contact/Lost Wheel	3	17	0	5
27	18	(Netherlands) Rinus VeeKay	Dale Coyne Racing	Honda	6	Mechanical	0	7	0	5
Fastest lap: (Cayman Islands) Kyffin Simpson (Chip Ganassi Racing) – 01.02.2421 (lap 54)
Official race results

== Championship standings after the race ==
Drivers' Championship standings

	Pos.	Driver	Points
Unchanged	1	(Spain) Álex Palou	311
Unchanged	2	(Mexico) Pato O'Ward	221 (–90)
	3	(United States) Kyle Kirkwood	209 (–102)
	4	(Denmark) Christian Lundgaard	205 (–106)
	5	(Australia) Will Power	175 (–136)

Engine manufacturer standings

	Pos.	Manufacturer	Points
Unchanged	1	Honda	630
Unchanged	2	Chevrolet	509 (–121)

- Note: Only the top five positions are included.

Previous race: 2025 Indianapolis 500	IndyCar Series; 2025 season	Next race: 2025 Bommarito Automotive Group 500
Previous race: 2024 Chevrolet Detroit Grand Prix	Chevrolet Detroit Grand Prix	Next race: 2026 Chevrolet Detroit Grand Prix
