= 2026 Chevrolet Detroit Grand Prix =

Indycar race held in Detroit, Michigan

(United States) 2026 Chevrolet Detroit Grand Prix
Race details
8th round of the 2026 IndyCar season
← Previous race	Next race →
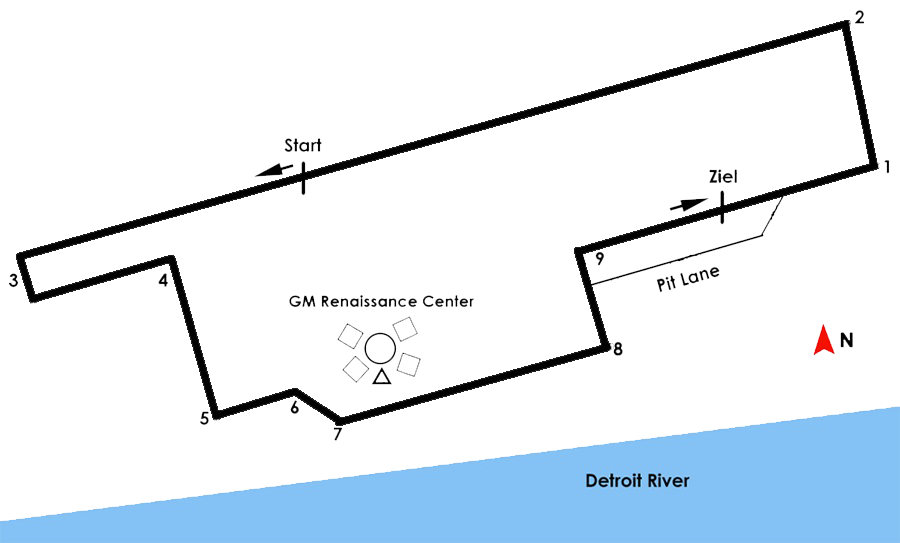
- Layout of the Detroit Street Circuit
- Date: May 31, 2026
- Official name: Chevrolet Detroit Grand Prix
- Location: Detroit street circuit, Detroit, Michigan
- Course: Temporary street circuit 1.645 mi / 2.647 km
- Distance: 100 laps 164.500 mi / 264.737 km
- Weather: Clear 23 °C (73 °F)

Pole position
- Driver: (Spain) Álex Palou (Chip Ganassi Racing)
- Time: 1:01.9017

Fastest lap
- Driver: (Spain) Álex Palou (Chip Ganassi Racing)
- Time: 1:03.0794 (on lap 8 of 100)

Podium
- First: (Spain) Álex Palou (Chip Ganassi Racing)
- Second: (United States) Kyle Kirkwood (Andretti Global)
- Third: (United States) Graham Rahal (Rahal Letterman Lanigan Racing)

Chronology
Previous	Next
2025	2027

The 2026 Chevrolet Detroit Grand Prix was the eighth round of the 2026 IndyCar season. The race was held on May 31, 2026, in Detroit, Michigan at the Detroit Street Circuit. The race contested of 100 laps. Álex Palou won the race. Kyle Kirkwood finished 2nd, and Graham Rahal finished 3rd. Pato O'Ward and Christian Lundgaard rounded out the top five, and Felix Rosenqvist, Louis Foster, Marcus Ericsson, Kyffin Simpson, and Josef Newgarden rounded out the top ten.

== Race background ==
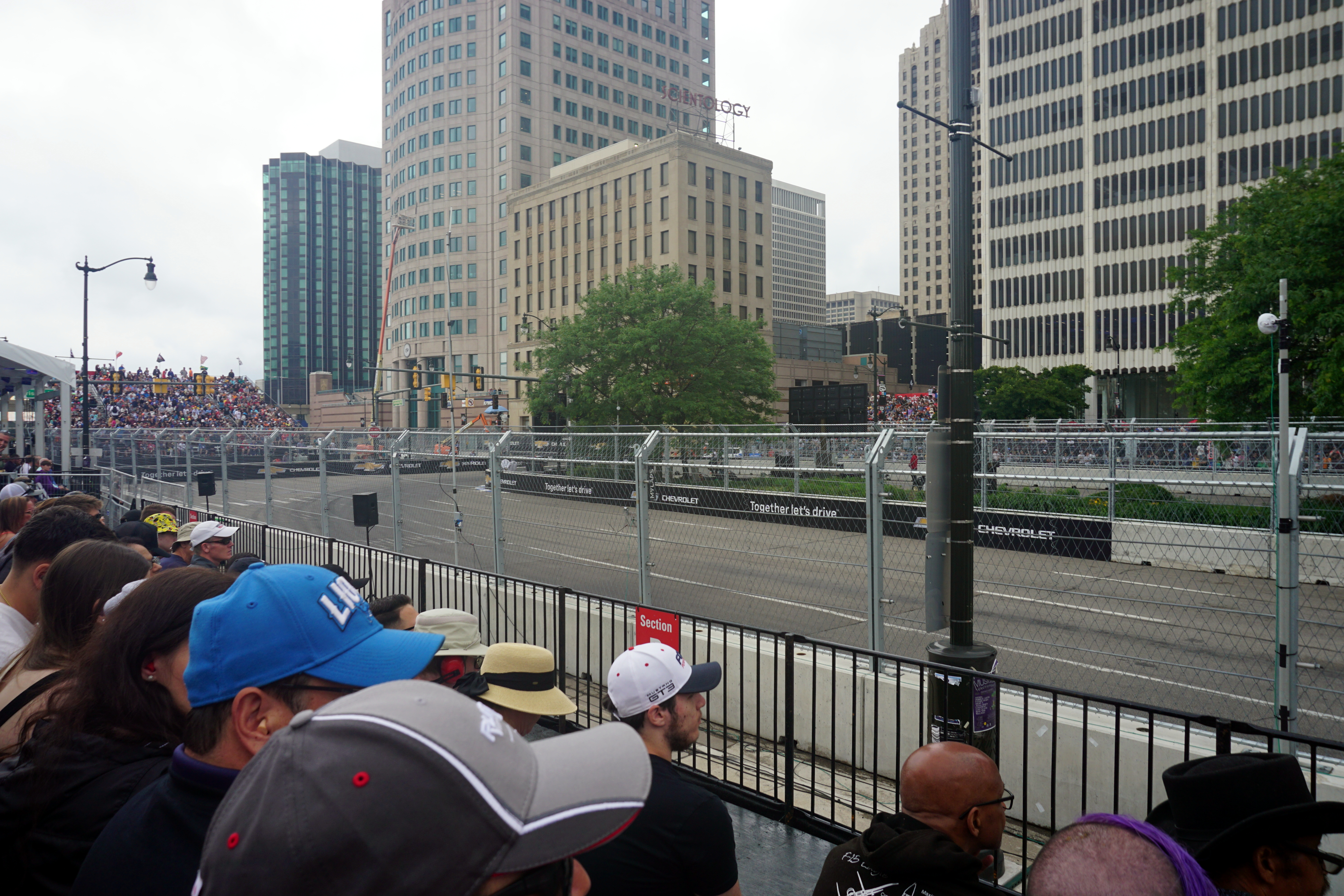
The start of the 2024 Chevrolet Detroit Grand Prix

The Chevrolet Detroit Grand Prix, is held on the streets of Detroit, Michigan on its 10-turn layout. A 1.645-mile (2.65 km) street course, the new layout first was used in 2023. It is currently a points-paying race of the NTT IndyCar Series. The event is contested by "Indy cars", a formula of professional-level, single-seat, open cockpit, open-wheel, purpose-built race cars. The race is traditionally held after the most prestigious event of the IndyCar calendar, and one of the oldest and most important automobile races in the world, the Indianapolis 500.

== Entry list ==
Key	Meaning
R	Rookie
W	Past winner

No.	Driver	Team	Engine
2	(United States) Josef Newgarden W	Team Penske	Chevrolet
3	(New Zealand) Scott McLaughlin	Team Penske	Chevrolet
4	(Brazil) Caio Collet R	A.J. Foyt Racing	Chevrolet
5	(Mexico) Pato O'Ward	Arrow McLaren	Chevrolet
6	(United States) Nolan Siegel	Arrow McLaren	Chevrolet
7	(Denmark) Christian Lundgaard	Arrow McLaren	Chevrolet
8	(Cayman Islands) Kyffin Simpson	Chip Ganassi Racing	Honda
9	(New Zealand) Scott Dixon W	Chip Ganassi Racing	Honda
10	(Spain) Álex Palou W	Chip Ganassi Racing	Honda
12	(United States) David Malukas	Team Penske	Chevrolet
14	(United States) Santino Ferrucci	A. J. Foyt Racing	Chevrolet
15	(United States) Graham Rahal W	Rahal Letterman Lanigan Racing	Honda
18	(France) Romain Grosjean	Dale Coyne Racing	Honda
19	(Norway) Dennis Hauger R	Dale Coyne Racing	Honda
20	(United States) Alexander Rossi	ECR	Chevrolet
21	(Denmark) Christian Rasmussen	ECR	Chevrolet
26	(Australia) Will Power W	Andretti Global	Honda
27	(United States) Kyle Kirkwood W	Andretti Global with Curb-Agajanian	Honda
28	(Sweden) Marcus Ericsson W	Andretti Global	Honda
45	(United Kingdom) Louis Foster	Rahal Letterman Lanigan Racing	Honda
47	(Germany) Mick Schumacher R	Rahal Letterman Lanigan Racing	Honda
60	(Sweden) Felix Rosenqvist	Meyer Shank Racing with Curb-Agajanian	Honda
66	(New Zealand) Marcus Armstrong	Meyer Shank Racing with Curb-Agajanian	Honda
76	(Netherlands) Rinus VeeKay	Juncos Hollinger Racing	Chevrolet
77	(United States) Sting Ray Robb	Juncos Hollinger Racing	Chevrolet

== Practice ==
=== Practice 1 ===
Top Practice Speeds
Pos	No.	Driver	Team	Engine	Lap Time
1	10	(Spain) Álex Palou W	Chip Ganassi Racing	Honda	01:02.7722
2	27	(United States) Kyle Kirkwood W	Andretti Global	Honda	01:02.7914
3	26	(Australia) Will Power W	Andretti Global	Honda	01:02.9433

=== Practice 2 ===
Top Practice Speeds
Pos	No.	Driver	Team	Engine	Lap Time
1	27	(United States) Kyle Kirkwood W	Andretti Global	Honda	01:01.8145
2	26	(Australia) Will Power W	Andretti Global	Honda	01:01.9453
3	5	(Mexico) Pato O'Ward	Arrow McLaren	Chevrolet	01:02.1949

== Qualifying ==
Qualifying was held at 1:00 PM ET on May 30, 2026.

=== Qualifying classification ===
Pos	No.	Driver	Team	Engine	Time	Final grid
1	10	(Spain) Álex Palou W	Chip Ganassi Racing	Honda	1:01.9017	1
2	26	(Australia) Will Power W	Andretti Global	Honda	1:02.1249	2
3	3	(New Zealand) Scott McLaughlin	Team Penske	Chevrolet	1:02.4559	3
4	9	(New Zealand) Scott Dixon W	Chip Ganassi Racing	Honda	1:02.6085	4
5	7	(Denmark) Christian Lundgaard	Arrow McLaren	Chevrolet	1:02.7870	5
6	27	(United States) Kyle Kirkwood W	Andretti Global	Honda	1:03.0303	6
7	5	(Mexico) Pato O'Ward	Arrow McLaren	Chevrolet	1:01.5966	7
8	66	(New Zealand) Marcus Armstrong	Meyer Shank Racing with Curb Agajanian	Honda	1:01.6973	8
9	21	(Denmark) Christian Rasmussen	ECR	Chevrolet	1:01.7122	9
10	28	(Sweden) Marcus Ericsson W	Andretti Global	Honda	1:01.7770	10
11	45	(United Kingdom) Louis Foster	Rahal Letterman Lanigan Racing	Chevrolet	1:01.8340	11
12	15	(United States) Graham Rahal W	Rahal Letterman Lanigan Racing	Honda	1:01.9830	12
13	6	(United States) Nolan Siegel	Arrow McLaren	Chevrolet	1:02.7656	13
14	20	(United States) Alexander Rossi	ECR	Chevrolet	1:02.1614	14
15	19	(Norway) Dennis Hauger R	Dale Coyne Racing	Honda	1:02.8249	15
16	60	(Sweden) Felix Rosenqvist	Meyer Shank Racing with Curb-Agajanian	Honda	1:02.1863	16
17	8	(Cayman Islands) Kyffin Simpson	Chip Ganassi Racing	Honda	1:03.3399	17
18	76	(Netherlands) Rinus VeeKay	Juncos Hollinger Racing	Chevrolet	1:02.2800	18
19	4	(Brazil) Caio Collet R	A.J. Foyt Racing	Chevrolet	1:03.3440	19
20	18	(France) Romain Grosjean	Dale Coyne Racing	Honda	1:02.3191	20
21	2	(United States) Josef Newgarden W	Team Penske	Chevrolet	1:03.4034	21
22	14	(United States) Santino Ferrucci	A. J. Foyt Racing	Chevrolet	1:02.4114	22
23	47	(Germany) Mick Schumacher R	Rahal Letterman Lanigan Racing	Honda	1:07.4493	23
24	77	(United States) Sting Ray Robb	Juncos Hollinger Racing	Chevrolet	1:02.7978	24
25	12	(United States) David Malukas	Team Penske	Chevrolet	1:04.6118	25
Official Report

Notes

- **Bold text** indicates fastest time.

== Warmup ==
Top Practice Speeds
Pos	No.	Driver	Team	Engine	Lap Time
1	27	(United States) Kyle Kirkwood W	Andretti Global	Honda	01:02.4051
2	60	(Sweden) Felix Rosenqvist	Meyer Shank Racing	Honda	01:03.0140
3	5	(Mexico) Pato O'Ward	Arrow McLaren	Chevrolet	01:03.1780

== Race ==
The race was held at 12:30 PM ET on May 31, 2026.

=== Race classification ===
Pos	No.	Driver	Team	Engine	Laps	Time/Retired	Pit Stops	Grid	Laps Led	Pts.
1	10	(Spain) Álex Palou W	Chip Ganassi Racing	Honda	100	1:59:08.5542	2	1	71	54^{1}
2	27	(United States) Kyle Kirkwood W	Andretti Global	Honda	100	1:59:11.6126	2	6	5	41^{2}
3	15	(United States) Graham Rahal W	Rahal Letterman Lanigan Racing	Honda	100	1:59:13.7345	3	12	-	35
4	5	(Mexico) Pato O'Ward	Arrow McLaren	Chevrolet	100	1:59:14.7958	2	7	-	32
5	7	(Denmark) Christian Lundgaard	Arrow McLaren	Chevrolet	100	1:59:15.8175	2	5	3	31^{2}
6	60	(Sweden) Felix Rosenqvist	Meyer Shank Racing	Honda	100	1:59:16.7470	3	16	1	29^{2}
7	45	(United Kingdom) Louis Foster	Rahal Letterman Lanigan Racing	Chevrolet	100	1:59:17.3545	2	11	-	26
8	28	(Sweden) Marcus Ericsson W	Andretti Global	Honda	100	1:59:17.8016	2	10	-	24
9	8	(Cayman Islands) Kyffin Simpson	Chip Ganassi Racing	Honda	100	1:59:18.2286	2	17	-	22
10	2	(United States) Josef Newgarden W	Team Penske	Chevrolet	100	1:59:20.4506	3	21	-	20
11	66	(New Zealand) Marcus Armstrong	Meyer Shank Racing with Curb Agajanian	Honda	100	1:59:21.0843	4	8	1	20^{2}
12	76	(Netherlands) Rinus VeeKay	Juncos Hollinger Racing	Chevrolet	100	1:59:21.9541	3	18	-	18
13	19	(Norway) Dennis Hauger R	Dale Coyne Racing	Honda	100	1:59:22.7421	3	15	-	17
14	77	(United States) Sting Ray Robb	Juncos Hollinger Racing	Chevrolet	100	1:59:23.5061	3	24	-	16
15	6	(United States) Nolan Siegel	Arrow McLaren	Chevrolet	100	1:59:23.8777	2	13	-	15
16	4	(Brazil) Caio Collet R	A.J. Foyt Racing	Chevrolet	100	1:59:24.5141	5	19	-	14
17	20	(United States) Alexander Rossi	ECR	Chevrolet	100	2:00:02.5983	3	14	-	13
18	12	(United States) David Malukas	Team Penske	Chevrolet	96	1:59:28.6449	4	25	-	12
19	3	(New Zealand) Scott McLaughlin	Team Penske	Chevrolet	96	1:59:46.2272	3	3	-	11
20	18	(France) Romain Grosjean	Dale Coyne Racing	Honda	91	Contact	2	20	-	10
21	47	(Germany) Mick Schumacher R	Rahal Letterman Lanigan Racing	Honda	91	2:00:09.2451	4	23	-	9
22	26	(Australia) Will Power W	Andretti Global	Honda	79	Contact	2	2	18	9^{2}
23	14	(United States) Santino Ferrucci	A. J. Foyt Racing	Chevrolet	78	Mechanical	3	22	-	7
24	9	(New Zealand) Scott Dixon W	Chip Ganassi Racing	Honda	69	Mechanical	1	4	-	6
25	21	(Denmark) Christian Rasmussen	ECR	Chevrolet	9	Contact	0	9	-	5
Fastest lap: (Spain) Alex Palou (Chip Ganassi Racing) - 1:03.0794 (Lap 8)
Official report

- ^{1} Driver received 1 bonus point for getting pole position, 1 for leading a lap and 2 for leading the most laps
- ^{2} Driver received 1 bonus point for leading a lap

== Championship standings after the race ==
Drivers' Championship standings

	Pos.	Driver	Points
Unchanged	1	(Spain) Álex Palou	327
plus	2	(United States) Kyle Kirkwood	265
minus	3	(United States) David Malukas	248
Unchanged	4	(Denmark) Christian Lundgaard	226
Unchanged	5	(Mexico) Pato O'Ward	220

Engine manufacturer standings

	Pos.	Manufacturer	Points
Unchanged	1	Honda	664
Unchanged	2	Chevrolet	614

- Note: Only the top five positions are included.

Previous race: 2026 Indianapolis 500	IndyCar Series; 2026 season	Next race: 2026 Bommarito Automotive Group 500
Previous race: 2025 Chevrolet Detroit Grand Prix	Chevrolet Detroit Grand Prix	Next race: 2027 Chevrolet Detroit Grand Prix
